= Maipo Department =

Maipo Department is a former department of Chile. Its capital was the commune of Buin.

== History ==
The department was created by president Domingo Santa María on 10 December 1883, with territory of the Rancagua Department. Simultaneously, the O'Higgins Province was created on such day.

Beginning 1 February 1928, as the DFL 8582 entered into force, the department was incorporated into Santiago Province. Its territory was also modified, excluding El Monte, third district of the Valdivia de Paine subdelegation. In 1934, despite the restoration of O'Higgins Province, Maipo Department remained in Santiago Province.

The department was suppressed on 1 January 1976 as the "regionalización" entered into effect, during the military dictatorship of Pinochet. Its territory would form Maipo Province, within Santiago Metropolitan Region.

== Government ==
The Municipality of Buin was in charge of the local administration of the department. The department government was also located in Buin. In 1891, four municipalities were established as a result of the "Decree of Creation of Municipalities": Buin, Maipo, Valdivia de Paine and Estación de Hospital (or simply Hospital). Later that decade, the municipalities of Pirque and Santa Rosa were also established, and later, Paine.
