= List of town tramway systems in Chile =

This is a list of town tramway systems in Chile by region. It includes all tram systems, past and present. Regions of Chile are arranged geographically, from north to south.

== XV Arica-Parinacota ==
| Name of System | Location | Traction Type | Date (From) | Date (To) | Notes |
|---|---|---|---|---|---|
| | Arica | ? | ? | ? | see note. |

- Note for Arica: Morrison (1992) states that old postcards show rails in the streets of this town, but no other evidence of a town tramway could be found.

== I Tarapacá ==
| Name of System | Location | Traction Type | Date (From) | Date (To) | Notes |
|---|---|---|---|---|---|
| | Iquique | Horse | 1885 | 192_ | |
| | Iquique | Accumulator (storage battery) | 1916 (or 1917 | ? | |
| | Iquique | Petrol (gasoline) | ? | 1930 | Heritage tramway opened October 24, 2004. |
| | Pisagua | Horse | 1889 | 1917 | |

== II Antofagasta ==
| Name of System | Location | Traction Type | Date (From) | Date (To) | Notes |
|---|---|---|---|---|---|
| | Antofagasta | Horse | 1893 | 1914 | |
| | Tocopilla | Horse | 1904 | 1909 (?) | |

== III Atacama ==
| Name of System | Location | Traction Type | Date (From) | Date (To) | Notes |
|---|---|---|---|---|---|
| | Copiapó | Horse | 1890 | 1904 (?) | |

== IV Coquimbo ==
| Name of System | Location | Traction Type | Date (From) | Date (To) | Notes |
|---|---|---|---|---|---|
| | Coquimbo | Horse | 1895 | 1929 | |
| | La Serena | Horse | 1887 | 1922 | |

== V Valparaíso ==
| Name of System | Location | Traction Type | Date (From) | Date (To) | Notes |
|---|---|---|---|---|---|
| | Cartagena | Horse | 1909 | ca. 1935 | |
| | Los Andes | Horse | 1889 | ? | |
| | Limache | Horse | 1884 | 193_ | |
| | Quillota | Horse | 1884 (?) | 1923 (?) | |
| | San Antonio | Horse | 188_ | ? | |
| | San Antonio | Steam | ? | ? | |
| | San Antonio | Petrol (gasoline) | ? | 193_ | |
| | San Felipe | Horse | 1886 | 1933 (?) | |
| | Valparaíso | Horse | March 4, 1863 | 1907 | |
| | Valparaíso | Electric | December 26, 1904 | December 30, 1952 | . See also Trolleybuses in Valparaíso. |
| | ♦ Viña del Mar | Horse | 1888 | 1906 | |
| | ♦ Viña del Mar | Electric | see Valparaíso – Viña del Mar | | |
| | ♦ Valparaíso – Viña del Mar | Electric | January 28, 1906 | 1947 | (Morrison (1992, page 33) states that horse trams worked much of the service until full electric operation began on November 11, 1906). |

== RM Región Metropolitana de Santiago ==
Neighboring and suburban tramway systems in the Santiago region, arranged anti- (counter-) clockwise, northwest to east.

| Name of System | Location | Traction Type | Date (From) | Date (To) | Notes |
|---|---|---|---|---|---|
| | Santiago (de Chile) | Horse | June 10, 1858; 1920 | 1912; 1942 | . |
| | Santiago (de Chile) | Petrol (gasoline) | 1922 | 1940 | . |
| | Santiago (de Chile) | Electric | September 2, 1900 | February 21, 1959 | . |
| | Santiago (de Chile) | Electric | January 11, 1902 | April 30, 1910 | Electric rack tramway, on Cerro Santa Lucía hill. |
| | Renca | Horse | ? | ? | . |
| | Batuco | Horse | 194_ | ca. 1975 | Horse tramway operation on branch of Santiago – Valparaíso railway (Morrison (1992, page 54)) . |
| | ♦ Santiago – Pudahuel | Horse, Steam | 1903 | 192_ | |
| | ♦ Santiago – Pudahuel | Petrol (gasoline) | 192_ | 1934 | Part of line electrified in 1934; remainder of line to Pudahuel and branches to Cerro Navia and Resbalón. Electrified segment closed 1939 |
| | ♦ Quinta Normal | Horse | 1904 | 1929 | . |
| | ♦ Quinta Normal | Electric | 1929 | after 1965 | . |
| | ♦ Maipú | Horse | 1910 (?) | 193_ | |
| | ♦ Malloco – Peñaflor | Horse | 1915 (?) | after 1936 | . |
| | ♦ Melipilla | Horse | 1915 | 1932 | . |
| | ♦ Santiago – San Bernardo | Horse | 1901 | 1907 (?) | |
| | ♦ Santiago – San Bernardo | Electric | February 9, 1907 | May 15, 1948 | , . |
| | ♦ La Cisterna – La Granja | Horse | 1907 | 1942 | . |
| | ♦ Nos – Santa Inés | Horse | 1900 | 1948 | . |
| | ♦ Santiago – Puente Alto | Electric | 1925 | 1962 | . |
| | ♦ Buin – Santa Rita | Horse | ? | 1938 (?) | . |
| | ♦ Buin – Maipo | Horse | 1918 (?) | ? | . |
| | ♦ Puente Alto | Electric | 1925 | 195_ (by 1963) | . |
| | ♦ Chacarilla | Horse | ? | 1923 (?) | . |

== VI O'Higgins ==
| Name of System | Location | Traction Type | Date (From) | Date (To) | Notes |
|---|---|---|---|---|---|
| | Graneros | Horse | 1920 | after 1934 (?) | |
| | Rancagua | Horse | Jul 1905 | 1918 | |
| | Rancagua | Electric | July 8, 1918 | 1930 | Morrison describes unsuccessful efforts to find photographs of the Rancagua tramway. |
| | Rengo | Horse | 1872 | 1918 (?) | |
| | Rengo | Electric | March 14, 1918 | 1923 | |
| | Rengo | Petrol (gasoline) | 1923 | ca. 1927 | Morrison states that no photographs of the Rengo tramway could be found. |

== VII Maule ==
| Name of System | Location | Traction Type | Date (From) | Date (To) | Notes |
|---|---|---|---|---|---|
| | Cauquenes | Horse | 1900 | 1915 (?) | |
| | Constitución | Horse | ca. 1915 | 1934 | |
| | Molina | Horse | by 1915 | 1927 | |
| | Parral | Horse | ca. 1911 | 1928 | |
| | San Javier | Horse | 1906 | 1927 | |
| | Talca | Horse | ca. 1884 | 1916 | |
| | Talca | Electric | 1916 | 1933 | Operation suspended December 1, 1928, because of damage caused by earthquake. Part of system restored December 25, 1928. |
| | Villa Alegre | Electric | August 29, 1915 | November 26, 1926 | Closed Oct 1923, reopened Sep 1925 by a new undertaking. |
| | Villa Alegre | Petrol (gasoline) | 1926 | 1931 | Horse traction also used during 1926 – 1931. |

- Curicó Morrison states that Chilean government statistics reported an animal-powered tramway in Curicó Province, but that histories of Curicó town state that no tramway was built.

== VIII Bío-Bío ==
| Name of System | Location | Traction Type | Date (From) | Date (To) | Notes |
|---|---|---|---|---|---|
| | Chillán | Horse | 1877 (or 1884) | 194_ | |
| | Chillán | Electric | 1921 | 1936 | |
| | Concepción | Horse | 1886 | 1910 | |
| | Concepción | Electric | July 4, 1908 | November 21, 1941 | See note. |
| | ♦ Concepción – Talcahuano | Electric | July 4, 1908 | November 21, 1941 | See note. |
| | ♦ Talcahuano | Horse | 1898 | 1928 | Connected Talcahuano and San Vicente. |
| | ♦ Talcahuano | Electric | 1908 | November 21, 1941 | See note. |
| | Pemuco | Horse | 1909 | 192_ | |
| | San Carlos | Horse | 1894 | 1928 | |

Non-public tramway:

| Name of System | Location | Traction Type | Date (From) | Date (To) | Notes |
|---|---|---|---|---|---|
| | Lebu | Electric | 1914 | ? | |

- Note for Concepción, Concepción – Talcahuano and Talcahuano: Operation suspended January 24, 1939 – Feb 1939 because of damage caused by earthquake.

== IX Araucanía ==
| Name of System | Location | Traction Type | Date (From) | Date (To) | Notes |
|---|---|---|---|---|---|
| | Curacautín | Horse (?) | 192_ (?) | 192_ (?) | |
| | Temuco | Horse | 1881 | 1920 | |
| | Temuco | Electric | Mar 1919 | 1936 | Southernmost electric tramway system in South America. |
| | Traiguén | Electric | 1903 | 1929 | Passenger service on electric goods (freight) railway (Morrison ). |

- Collipulli: Morrison states that the tramway listed here in Chilean government statistics was in fact a goods (freight) railway, worked by electric traction.

== X Los Lagos ==
| Name of System | Location | Traction Type | Date (From) | Date (To) | Notes |
|---|---|---|---|---|---|
| | Puerto Montt | Horse | 1921 | 1931 | |

== XII Magallanes y Antártica Chilena ==
| Name of System | Location | Traction Type | Date (From) | Date (To) | Notes |
|---|---|---|---|---|---|
| Ferrocarril Mina Loreto | Punta Arenas | Horse | January 29, 1902 | 1950 | Passenger service on railway, connecting docks to coal mine, with part of line built in streets. |

== See also ==
- List of town tramway systems
- List of town tramway systems in South America
- List of light-rail transit systems
- List of rapid transit systems
- List of trolleybus systems
