= Juan Acevedo Pavez =

Chilean politician (1914–2010)

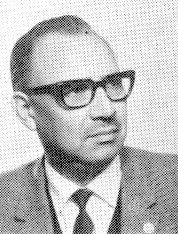

Regidor and mayor of San Bernardo
- In office 1950–1953 (as regidor); 1952 – 1953 (as regidor and mayor)

Deputy for the Eighth Departmental Group of Melipilla, San Antonio, San Bernardo, and Maipo
- In office 1953–1973

Personal details
- Born: November 8, 1914 Pichilemu, Chile
- Died: August 27, 2010 (aged 95) Santiago, Chile
- Party: Communist Party of Chile (PC), Socialist Party of Chile (PS), Popular Socialist Party
- Spouse: Carmen Blanchet Gurbens
- Children: 2
- Occupation: Accountant, Electrical and Civil Constructor
- Website: Biography at the Chilean Library of Congress (in Spanish)

Juan Acevedo Pavez (November 8, 1914 – August 27, 2010) was a Chilean politician, who held office as regidor and mayor of the commune of San Bernardo, and was a member of the Chamber of Deputies of Chile, representing the Eighth Departmental Group of Melipilla, San Antonio, San Bernardo, and Maipo.

== Biography ==
=== Early life and studies ===
Juan Acevedo Pavez was born in Pichilemu, then part of the Colchagua Province, Chile, on November 8, 1914; his parents were Juan Acevedo Cornejo, and Elena Pavez Castro.

Acevedo Pavez completed his secondary studies at the former School of Arts and Crafts (Escuela de Artes y Oficios, current University of Santiago de Chile), where he studied electricity and civil construction. Afterwards, he studied accounting in an institute.

He worked for the Chilean Company of Electricity (Compañía Chilena de Electricidad) between 1935 and 1953. Acevedo Pavez also worked for the Chilean State Transport Company (Empresa de Transportes del Estado).

Additionally, Acevedo Pavez was leader of the Group of Particular Employees (Gremio de Empleados Particulares) in his hometown of San Bernardo, between 1938 and 1942. He later became national secretary of the National Confederation of Particular Employees (Confederación Nacional de Empleados Particulares – CONSIEP), holding the office for eight years, between 1942 and 1950.

=== Political career ===
In December 1934, Acevedo Pavez joined the Socialist Party (PS). After being a member for almost twelve years, Acevedo Pavez left the Socialist Party for the Popular Socialist Party, in November 1946. He served as secretary of the party in San Bernardo between 1946 and 1950, and in Santiago, in 1951.

Acevedo Pavez was elected regidor of the San Bernardo commune in 1950, holding the office until 1953; and in 1952, he was elected mayor, also holding the office until 1953.

In 1953, he was elected deputy for the Eighth Departmental Group of Melipilla, San Antonio, San Bernardo, and Maipo; during his first term as deputy (which lasted until 1957), he was member of the Permanent Committee on National Defence, the Special Committee on Housing, the Special Commission of Inquiry into the Implementation of Law No. 12,151 (between 1953 and 1954), the Committee on Tax Evasion (1955–1956), the Commission on Irregularities in the State Maritime Company (1956), and the commission on the events that occurred in the Pedro de Valdivia Office. Also during his term, he renounced the Popular Socialist Party, and stood as an independent politician.

In 1957, he was re-elected deputy for the same departmental group. He joined the Communist Party (PC) in 1958. During his second term as deputy, he incorporated several committees in the Chamber of Deputies, including the Interior Government Committee, the Roads and Public Works Committee, and the Physical Education and Sports Committee, among others.

Juan Acevedo Pavez was re-elected deputy for the same departmental group three more times: in 1961, 1965, and 1969. During this time, Acevedo Pérez would hold offices such as: substitute member of the Communist Parliamentary Committee, second vice president of the chamber of deputies (in 1969), and first vice president of the chamber of deputies (from 1970 until 1971). Acevedo's fifth term as deputy lasted until 1973; it was his last political occupation.

=== Death ===
Juan Acevedo Pavez died on August 27, 2010, in Santiago, Chile.

== Personal life ==
Acevedo was married to Carmen Blanchet Gurbens, with whom he had two children.
