= Pavez =

Pavez is a Spanish surname. Notable people with the surname include:

- Carlos Rojas Pavez (1906–1994), Chilean politician
- Esteban Pavez (born 1990), Chilean footballer
- Luis Antonio Pavez Contreras (born 1988), Chilean footballer
- Luis Alberto Pavez Muñoz (born 1995), Chilean footballer
- José Eduardo Pavez (born 1969), Mexican footballer
- Juan Acevedo Pavez (1914–2010), Chilean politician
- Monica Pavez, Canadian special effects make-up artist
- Sebastián Pavez (born 1996), Chilean handball player
- Terele Pávez (1939–2017), Spanish actress
