= List of town tramway systems in Argentina =

This is a list of town tramway systems in Argentina by Province. It includes all tram systems, past and present.

== Buenos Aires Province ==
Location	Article	Gauge (mm)	Traction Type	Date (from) (year-month-day)	Date (to) (year-month-day)	Notes
Bahía Blanca			Horse	?	?	
Bahía Blanca			Steam	1904	1910	
Bahía Blanca			Naptha	1906	1910	
Bahía Blanca			electric	1910-Mar-02	1938-Dec-11	
Chivilcoy			Horse	1895	?	
Dolores			Horse	1888	192_	
Magdalena			Horse (?)	?	?	An Argentine source states that the existence of this tramway is not confirmed .
Mar del Plata			Horse	1888	1923 (?)	
Mar del Plata			Steam	1915	?	
Mar del Plata			electric	1922-12-30	1954-Sep	
Necochea			Steam	1913	1914	
Necochea			electric	1914	1952-03-30	
San Nicolás (de los Arroyos)			Horse	1889	193_	

== Buenos Aires City ==
Location	Article	Gauge (mm)	Traction Type	Date (from) (year-month-day)	Date (to) (year-month-day)	Notes
Buenos Aires			Horse	1863	1925	
Buenos Aires			Steam	?	?	
Buenos Aires			electric	1897-04-22	1963-02-20	
Buenos Aires	"Pre-metro" line E2	1435	electric	1987-04-28		
Buenos Aires	Tranvía del Este	1435	electric	2007-07-15	2012-10-10	using just one loaned tram (two in first year)

Also: Heritage tramway in the Caballito district (Buenos Aires Historic Tramway) opened 15 Nov 1980.

Neighboring and suburban tramway systems in Buenos Aires Province, arranged anti- (counter-) clockwise, northwest to southeast.

Location	Article	Gauge (mm)	Traction Type	Date (from) (year-month-day)	Date (to) (year-month-day)	Notes
♦ San Isidro			Horse	1913	?	
♦ San Isidro			"Naptha"	?	?	
♦ Tigre			Horse	?	?	
Connected Buenos Aires with San Martín, Empalme, San Andrés de Giles, Zárate, and San Antonio de Areco.	Tramway Rural		Horse/electric	1888	1965 ?	Ran on exclusive right-of-way. Rebuilt as a railway, today Línea Urquiza
♦ Ituzaingó			Horse	1914	1926	
♦ Ituzaingó			"Naptha"	1926	1942	
♦ General Rodríguez			Horse	?	?	
♦ Luján			Horse	1888	192_	
♦ Temperley - Turdera			Horse	?	?	
♦ (José) Mármol - Claypole			Horse	?	?	
♦ (José) Mármol - Claypole			"Naptha"	?	?	
♦ Adrogué - San Vicente			Horse	1898	1920	
♦ Adrogué - San Vicente			"Naptha"	1920	1928	
♦ Lanús			Horse	1884 by	?	
♦ Lanús			electric	1904	1964-12-31	Connected Avellaneda and Lanús.
♦ Lomas de Zamora			Steam	?	?	
♦ Lomas de Zamora			Horse	?	?	
♦ Lomas de Zamora			"Naptha"	?	?	
♦ Lomas de Zamora			electric	1910	1948	Connected Avellaneda and Lomas de Zamora.
♦ Quilmes			electric	1913 (or 1918)	1957-04-28	
♦ La Plata			Horse	1884	1910	
♦ La Plata			Steam	1909	?	
♦ La Plata			"Naptha"	?	?	
♦ La Plata			electric	1892-10-22; 1910-Jan-03	? 1966-12-25	Tramway connected La Plata with Ensenada and Berisso.
♦♦ Berisso			Horse	?	?	
♦♦ Berisso			electric	?	?	
♦♦ Ensenada			Horse	?	?	
♦♦ La Plata - Esteban Echeverría			Steam	?	?	

== Catamarca ==
Location	Article	Gauge (mm)	Traction Type	Date (from) (year-month-day)	Date (to) (year-month-day)	Notes
(San Fernando del Valle de) Catamarca			Horse	1887	1930	

== Chaco ==
Location	Article	Gauge (mm)	Traction Type	Date (from) (year-month-day)	Date (to) (year-month-day)	Notes
Puerto Tirol			Steam	?	?	
Resistencia			Steam	1903	?	Connected Resistencia and Barranqueras.

== Córdoba ==
Location	Article	Gauge (mm)	Traction Type	Date (from) (year-month-day)	Date (to) (year-month-day)	Notes
Bell Ville			Horse	1901	1910	
Córdoba			Horse	1879	1925	
Córdoba			electric	1909-08-22	1963	
Río Cuarto			Horse	1885	1902	
Valle Hermoso			Electric	6 Mar 1998		Encompasses various scientific, botanical and environmental exhibits, including a planetarium.
Villa María			Horse	1887	1891	Connected Villa María and Villa Nueva.
Villa María			(Petrol (gasoline))			see note.

- Note for Villa María: Tramway constructed in 1911, using materials salvaged from closed system at Bell Ville and tramcars equipped with internal-combustion engines. Not opened because of construction deficiencies

== Corrientes ==
Location	Article	Gauge (mm)	Traction Type	Date (from) (year-month-day)	Date (to) (year-month-day)	Notes
Corrientes			Horse	1890	1908 (or 1925)	
Corrientes			Steam	1901	1908	
Corrientes			electric	1913-01-22	1930	
♦ Corrientes - San Luis			Steam	?	?	
♦ Corrientes - San Luis			electric	?	?	

== Entre Ríos ==
Location	Article	Gauge (mm)	Traction Type	Date (from) (year-month-day)	Date (to) (year-month-day)	Notes
Concordia			Horse	1880	1885	
Concordia			electric	1928-May-01	1963-Mar	
Gualeguaychú			Horse	1890	1910	
Paraná			Horse	1873	1929	
Paraná			electric	1921-05-20	1962	

== La Pampa ==
Location	Article	Gauge (mm)	Traction Type	Date (from) (year-month-day)	Date (to) (year-month-day)	Notes
Telén			Horse	?	?	

== Mendoza ==
Location	Article	Gauge (mm)	Traction Type	Date (from) (year-month-day)	Date (to) (year-month-day)	Notes
Mendoza			Horse	1885	1911	
Mendoza			electric	1912-Oct-01	1965-Nov	Reintroduced 2012 in the form of light rail,
Mendoza	Metrotranvía Mendoza	1435	electric	2012-Oct-08		Tramways & Urban Transit, p. 451. LRTA Publishing. ISSN 1460-8324.

== Salta ==
Location	Article	Gauge (mm)	Traction Type	Date (from) (year-month-day)	Date (to) (year-month-day)	Notes
Salta			Horse	1894	1913	
Salta			electric	1913-02-20	1935	

== San Juan ==
Location	Article	Gauge (mm)	Traction Type	Date (from) (year-month-day)	Date (to) (year-month-day)	Notes
San Juan			Horse	1888	?	Connected San Juan, Desamparados, Trinidad and Concepción.

== Santa Fe ==
Location	Article	Gauge (mm)	Traction Type	Date (from) (year-month-day)	Date (to) (year-month-day)	Notes
Esperanza			Horse	1885	1902 (before )	
Rafaela			Horse	?	1902 (after)	
Roldán			Horse	1915 ca.	?	
Rosario			Horse	1872	1910	
Rosario			Steam	?	?	
Rosario			electric	1906-10-31	1963-02-11	Being re-activated as the Rosario Tramway
Santa Fe			Horse	1885	1914	
Santa Fe			electric	1914-03-25	1961-04-30	

== Tucumán ==
Location	Article	Gauge (mm)	Traction Type	Date (from) (year-month-day)	Date (to) (year-month-day)	Notes
(San Miguel de) Tucumán			Horse	1882-12-25; 1905-12-25	1904; 1910-Dec	
(San Miguel de) Tucumán			electric	1909-10-22 (or 1910-01-01)	1965-Oct-12	
(San Miguel de) Tucumán			Steam	1916	1929	Connected Tucumán and Yerba Buena

== See also ==
- Trams in Buenos Aires
- List of town tramway systems
- List of town tramway systems in South America
- List of light-rail transit systems
- List of rapid transit systems
- List of trolleybus systems
