= Carlos Letelier =

Chilean Army general (1911–1998)

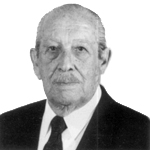

Appointed Senator
- In office 11 March 1990 – 11 March 1998

Personal details
- Born: 7 August 1911 San Bernardo, Chile
- Died: 1 August 1998 (aged 86) Santiago, Chile
- Spouse: Emilia Pérez
- Children: Five
- Education: University of Chile (LL.B)
- Profession: Lawyer

Carlos Roberto Letelier Bobadilla (born 2 May 1911 – 1 August 1998) was a Chilean Army lawyer, who served as senator.

== Biography ==
=== Family and youth ===
He was born in San Bernardo, Santiago, on 7 August 1911. He was the son of Carlos Letelier Letelier and Armelina Bobadilla.

On 9 December 1939, he married Emilia Pérez Robert. He was the father of María Solange, Carlos, Ana María, Jaime, and Isabel Margarita. He was a member of the Lions Club of Rancagua and the Automobile Club of Chile.

=== Professional career ===
He completed his studies at the Liceo de Hombres of San Bernardo and the Instituto Nacional in Santiago. After finishing secondary school, he entered the School of Law of the University of Chile, obtaining a degree in Legal and Social Sciences. His graduation thesis was entitled “On Interdicts or Summary Possessory Proceedings”. He was admitted to the bar in 1937.

In his professional practice, he worked in San Bernardo and Santiago. Between 1938 and 1943, he served as Secretary of the Intendancy of Chiloé.

== Political career ==
On 18 August 1943, he began his public career by joining the Judicial Branch as Secretary of the Court of Minor Jurisdiction of Valdivia. A few months later, on 20 March 1944, he assumed the position of Secretary of the Court of Rancagua.

On 28 June 1955, he was appointed Clerk ―Relator― of the Court of Appeals of Chillán, and on 4 October 1956, he became Clerk of the Court of Appeals of Talca. From 12 November 1957, he served as Judge of the Second Court of Talca.

On 14 April 1960, he was appointed Prosecutor ―Fiscal― of the Court of Appeals of Punta Arenas, and on 15 January 1963, he was appointed Justice of the same court.

On 29 September 1976, he assumed office as Justice of the Court of Appeals of Santiago, and on 25 October of the same year, he continued in that court, serving as its president in 1977.

On 24 April 1988, he was appointed Justice of the Supreme Court of Chile, a position he held until 5 September 1989. In his capacity as Supreme Court Justice, he joined the Electoral Qualification Court (TRICEL) on 17 August 1988. During the same period, he also served as acting president of the Antimonopoly Commission.

On 27 December 1989, in accordance with Article 45 of the Constitution then in force, he was appointed Institutional Senator in his capacity as former Justice of the Supreme Court for the 1990–1998 term. For the same period, former Supreme Court Justice Ricardo Martin Díaz was also appointed.
