= Laguna de Aculeo =

Lake in the Santiago Metropolitan Region of Chile

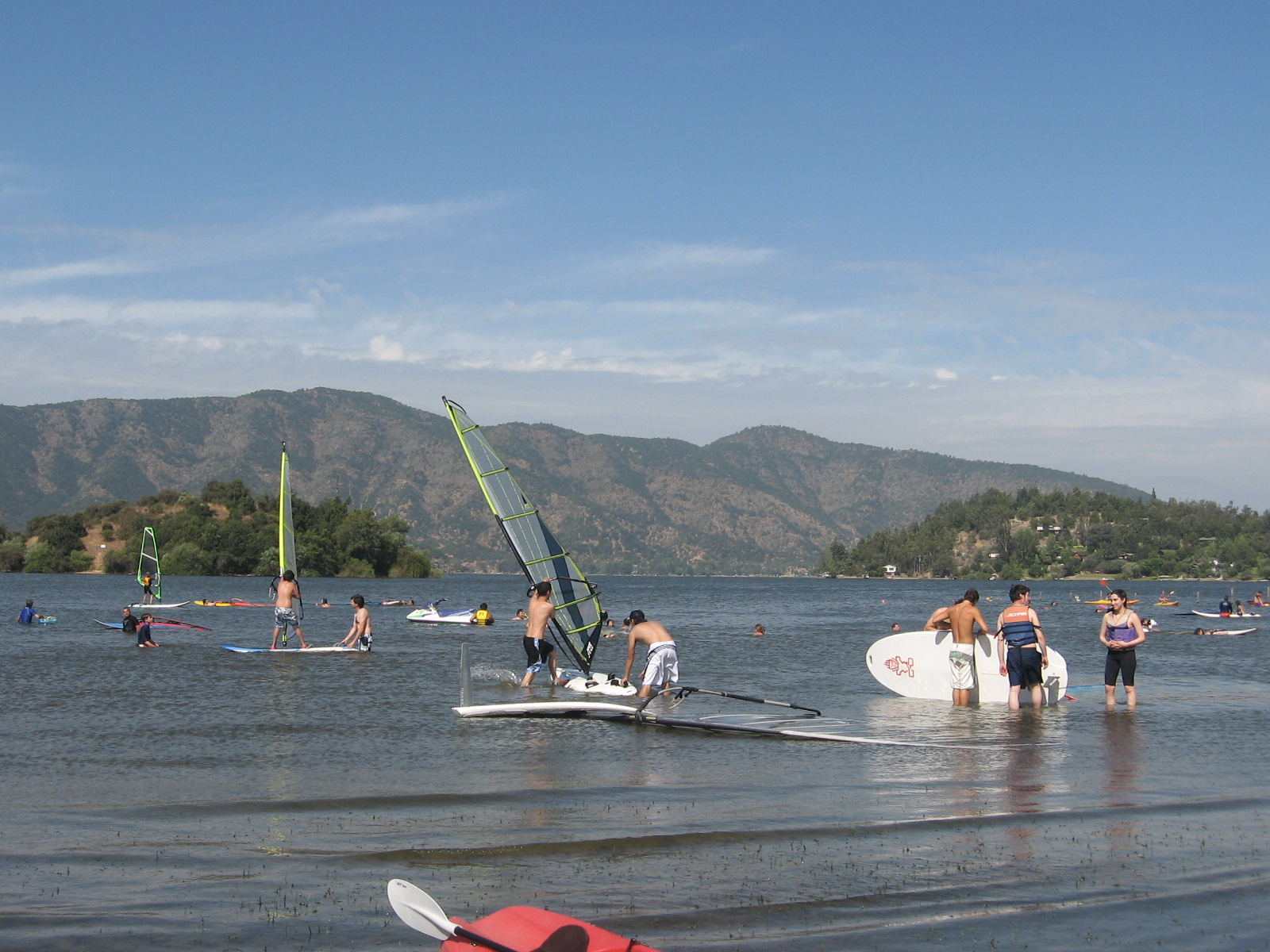
- Laguna de Aculeo (January 2009)

- Location in Chile
- Location: Maipo Province, Santiago Metropolitan Region
- Coordinates: 33°50′47″S 70°54′55″W
- Type: Lagoon
- Basin countries: Chile
- Surface area: 12 km^{2} (4.6 sq mi) (2011) 0 km^{2} (0 sq mi) (2018)
- Average depth: 6 m (20 ft) (2011) 0 m (0 ft) (2018)
- Settlements: Paine

Laguna de Aculeo is a lake located in the city of Paine, Maipo Province, Santiago Metropolitan Region, Chile. It featured muddy banks and is surrounded by gently tilting ground. The lake's bottom is largely impermeable limiting its connection to underground aquifers. It classifies as a sediment-dammed lake.

== History ==
The lake obtained its name from the Mapuche term Acum-Leu, meaning "where the river ends". Local folklore tells of a treasure, an entierro, that is hidden in the mud of the bottom of the lake since 1814.

Once a main tourist destination for individuals in Santiago, the lake featured a popular floating bar in the 1990s.

According to García-Chevesich, who co-authored a research paper about the lake, stated that the population growth, the purchase of water rights and drought resulted with the drying of the lake. In 2010, plantations and large estates purchased the water rights of tributaries feeding the lake and rerouted them for their own usage. The average annual rainfall in the region dropped from 350 mm/y in the 1980s to less than half that in the 2010s. In 2011 the lagoon was 12 km^{2} in size and 6 metres in depth. It disappeared entirely on May 9, 2018. Probable causes include a large influx of tourists, as well as using its waters for avocado cultivation, as well as increased water use by the nearby city of Paine and a longterm drought period since 2010, which is partially due to global warming.

The lake refilled in 2023.

== Reclamation ==
Reclamation projects are promoted to identify solutions for long-term recovery, especially voluntary watershed management agreements that will allow the rational and sustainable use of this resource. Since the lake derives much of its inflow from surface streams the need to keep or grow healthy forest cover in its watershed to act as a humidity storage has been deemed important for the lake's recovery. An eventual recovery of a permanent water surface would require various years of precipitation surplus.

== See also ==
- Drought in Chile
- Petorca water crisis
