= List of town tramway systems in South America =

This is a list of cities and towns in South America that have, or once had, town tramway (urban tramway, or streetcar) systems as part of their public transport system. Separate lists have been created for Argentina, Brazil and Chile to increase user-friendliness and reduce article size.

== Bolivia ==
Name of System	Location	Traction Type	Date (From)	Date (To)	Notes
	Cochabamba	Horse	1902	?	
	Cochabamba	Electric	1914; 1941	Jul 1939; May 30, 1948	
MiTren	Cochabamba	Electric	September 13, 2022		
	♦ Cochabamba – Quillacollo – Vinto	Electric	September 13, 1910; 1941	Jul 1939; 1943	
	(Nuestra Señora de) La Paz	Electric	July 16, 1909	1950	
	♦ La Paz – El Alto	Electric	December 1, 1905	May 1977	
	Oruro	Horse	July 9, 1907	June 30, 1914	
	Potosí	Horse	?	?	
	Potosí	Electric	1917 (?)	1918 (?)	see note.

- Note for Potosí: System built and (according to one source) inaugurated. Not known whether public service was operated.

== Colombia ==
Name of System	Location	Traction Type	Date (From)	Date (To)	Notes
	Barranquilla	Horse	?	1929	
	(Santa Fe de) Bogotá	Horse	December 24, 1884	1921	See: Trams in Bogotá.
	(Santa Fe de) Bogotá	Steam	?	?	
	(Santa Fe de) Bogotá	Electric	March 7, 1910	June 30, 1951	See: Trams in Bogotá. (Picture during Bogotazo.)
	(Santa Fe de) Bogotá	Accumulator (storage battery)	April 14, 1918	?	
	(Santiago de) Cali	Steam	?	192_	
	Cartagena (de Indias)	Horse	?	?	
	Cúcuta	Horse	?	?	
	Facatativá	Horse	?	?	
	Medellín	Horse	1886	1897	
	Medellín	Electric	October 21, 1921	Jul 1951	
Ayacucho Tram	Medellín	Electric	October 15, 2015		Translohr
	Pereira	Horse	?	?	
	Pereira	Electric	February 26, 1926	1956 (?)	

== Ecuador ==
Name of System	Location	Traction Type	Date (From)	Date (To)	Notes
	(Santiago de) Guayquil	Horse	1873	?	
	(Santiago de) Guayquil	Electric	January 15, 1910	1951	
	(San Francisco de) Quito	Electric	October 8, 1914	ca. 1948	
	♦ Quito – Cotocollao	Petrol (gasoline)	June 22, 1923	1928	
	(Santa Ana de los Ríos de) Cuenca	Electric	May 25, 2020	?	Cuenca Tramway

== Guyana ==
Name of System	Location	Traction Type	Date (From)	Date (To)	Notes
	Georgetown	Horse	1880	?	
	Georgetown	Electric	February 25, 1901	February 28, 1930	

== Paraguay ==
Name of System	Location	Traction Type	Date (From)	Date (To)	Notes
	(Nuestra Señora Santa María de la) Asunción	Horse	1872	?	. See Trams in Asunción.
	(Nuestra Señora Santa María de la) Asunción	Steam	1894	1932	. See Trams in Asunción.
	(Nuestra Señora Santa María de la) Asunción	Electric	July 10, 1913; 1975	1973; Jun (?) 1995	Operated on occasion for private hire (charter) service to Nov 1997. See Trams in Asunción.
	Concepción	Animal	?	?	

== Peru ==
Name of System	Location	Traction Type	Date (From)	Date (To)	Notes
	Arequipa	Horse	March 14, 1875	?	.
	Arequipa	Electric	July 18, 1913	January 9, 1966	.
	Catacaos	Horse	?	?	.
	Chiclayo	Horse	ca. 1890	1930	.
	Cusco	Horse	191_	1946	.
	Huacho	Horse	December 4, 1890	?	.
	Huacho	Accumulator (storage battery)	1922	1929	.
	Iquitos	Steam	1905	1935	.
Lima Tramway	Lima	Horse	March 24, 1878	?	
Lima Tramway	Lima	Electric	June 1, 1906	September 17, 1965	, , heritage tram opened on August 22, 1997.
	♦ Callao	Horse	1864	?	
	♦ Lima – Callao	Electric	July 27, 1904	September 17, 1965	, , .
	♦ Magdalena (del Mar)	Horse	18__	18__	
	♦ Lima – Magdalena	Electric	1909	September 17, 1965	, .
	♦ Miraflores, Barranco and (San Pedro de los) Chorrillos	Horse	18__	18__	
	♦ Miraflores, Barranco and (San Pedro de los) Chorrillos	Electric	191_	193_	, . In Miraflores and Barranco.
	♦ Lima – Miraflores – Barranco – Chorillos	Horse	1904	?	
	♦ Lima – Miraflores – Barranco – Chorillos	Electric	March 31, 1904	September 17, 1965	, , .
	Paita	Horse	August 30, 1891	192_	.
	Pisco	Horse	187_	?	.
	Pisco	Accumulator (storage battery)	Jan 1921	after 1935	.
	Piura	Horse	ca. 1890	193_	.
	San Pedro de Lloc	Horse	1880	?	.
	Trujillo	Horse	189_	193_	.

== Suriname ==
Name of System	Location	Traction Type	Date (From)	Date (To)	Notes
Lawa Railway	Paramaribo	Steam	1905	1957	

== Trinidad and Tobago ==
Name of System	Location	Traction Type	Date (From)	Date (To)	Notes
	Port of Spain	Electric	June 26, 1895, July (or Aug) 1902	1902 (?) 1956 (?)	

== Uruguay ==
Name of System	Location	Traction Type	Date (From)	Date (To)	Notes
	Colonia del Sacramento	Steam	?	?	
	Fray Bentos	"Naptha"	?	?	
	La Floresta	Horse	?	?	
	Montevideo	Horse	?	?	
	Montevideo	Electric	November 10, 1906	April 14, 1957	Heritage tramway, October 15, 1967 – April 28, 1974.
	Paysandú	Horse	?	?	
	Paysandú	"Naptha"	?	?	
	Piriápolis	Steam	?	?	
	Salto	Horse	?	1930	

== Venezuela ==
Name of System	Location	Traction Type	Date (From)	Date (To)	Notes
	Ciudad Bolívar	Horse	?	?	
	(Santiago de León de) Caracas	Steam	?	?	
	(Santiago de León de) Caracas	Electric	January 15, 1907	August 13, 1947	
	♦ Caracas – La Guaira	Steam	?	1928	
	♦ Caracas – La Guaira	Electric	April 9, 1928	1952	
Tranvías Eléctricos de Carúpano	Carúpano	Electric	January 9, 1916	June 28, 1933	
	Cumaná	Horse	1878?	?	
	La Guaira – Macuto – Maiquetía	Steam	1885	1914	
	La Guaira – Macuto – Maiquetía	Electric	May 9, 1914	November 9, 1933	
	Maracaibo	Horse	October 5, 1884	1925	.
	Maracaibo	Steam	1891	1917 (?)	. Connected Maracaibo and Bella Vista.
	Maracaibo	Accumulator (storage battery)	May 1915	1920 (?)	.
	Maracaibo	Electric	May 18, 1917	1934	. Former steam tramway (electrified) was first electric tramway line.
	Nueva Valencia del Rey /Valencia	Horse	?	?	
	Nueva Valencia del Rey /Valencia	Electric	11 (?) Jul 1915	1956	

== See also ==
- List of town tramway systems in Africa
- List of town tramway systems in Asia
- List of town tramway systems in Central America
- List of town tramway systems in Europe
- List of town tramway systems in North America
- List of town tramway systems
- List of tram and light rail transit systems
- List of metro systems
- List of trolleybus systems
