= National Rural and Indigenous Women's Association =

The National Rural and Indigenous Women's Association (Asociación Nacional de Mujeres Rurales e Indígenas, ANAMURI) is a non-profit and autonomous Chilean civil organization, which is only open to women. The organization was founded in 1998 in Buin, Chile. Its mission is to organize and promote the development of rural and indigenous Chilean women by stimulating and strengthening their organization.

ANAMURI forms part of the Latin American Coordinator of Field Organizations and the International Via Campesina (Coordinadora Latinoamericana de Organizaciones del Campo y la Vía Campesina Internacional). In 2016, ANAMURI had approximately 6800 partners.

== History ==
The National Association of Rural and Indigenous Women was founded June 13, 1998 in Buin. By the year 2018, ANAMURI was present in the Chilean regions ranging from Arica (Arica and Parinacota) to Coyhaique (Aysén), including indigenous Aymara, Colla, Diaguita and Mapuche from all over the country. Its headquarters is in the city of Santiago.

== Mission ==
The mission of ANAMURI is to organize and promote the development of the rural and indigenous women of Chile from Arica to Coyhaique, with consideration of their cultural, work, social, and economic diversity, with the intent of stimulating and strengthening their organization. The mission of ANAMURI is based on the construction of equal relationships, bringing together and coordinating the demands and interests of rural women at the national level. The women of ANAMURI fight to achieve food sovereignty of the people, recognizing the important role women have played in agricultural production since ancestral times.

== Leaders ==
Miriam Talavera (President of ANAMURI); Millaray Painemal Morales (Vice-president); María Vargas G (General Secretary); Mónica Hormazabal Baeza (Treasurer); Francisca Rodríguez Huerta (Secretary Organization); Jacqueline Arriagada Villegas (Front Producers); Viviana Catrileo Epul (Front Communications); Rosario Gómez Inostroza (Indigenous Front); Hilda Morales Morales (Cultural Delegate); Carla Nuñez Díaz (International Front); Ana María Fuentes Cáceres (Wage Front); Josefina Ovando Godoy (Natural Resources); Mafalda Galdames Castro (Training manager); Evelyn Cabezas Villarroel (Environment) Lirayen Reyes Galves (Youth Front).
