= Paine Memorial =

Memorial in Chile dedicated to victims of the Pinochet dictatorship

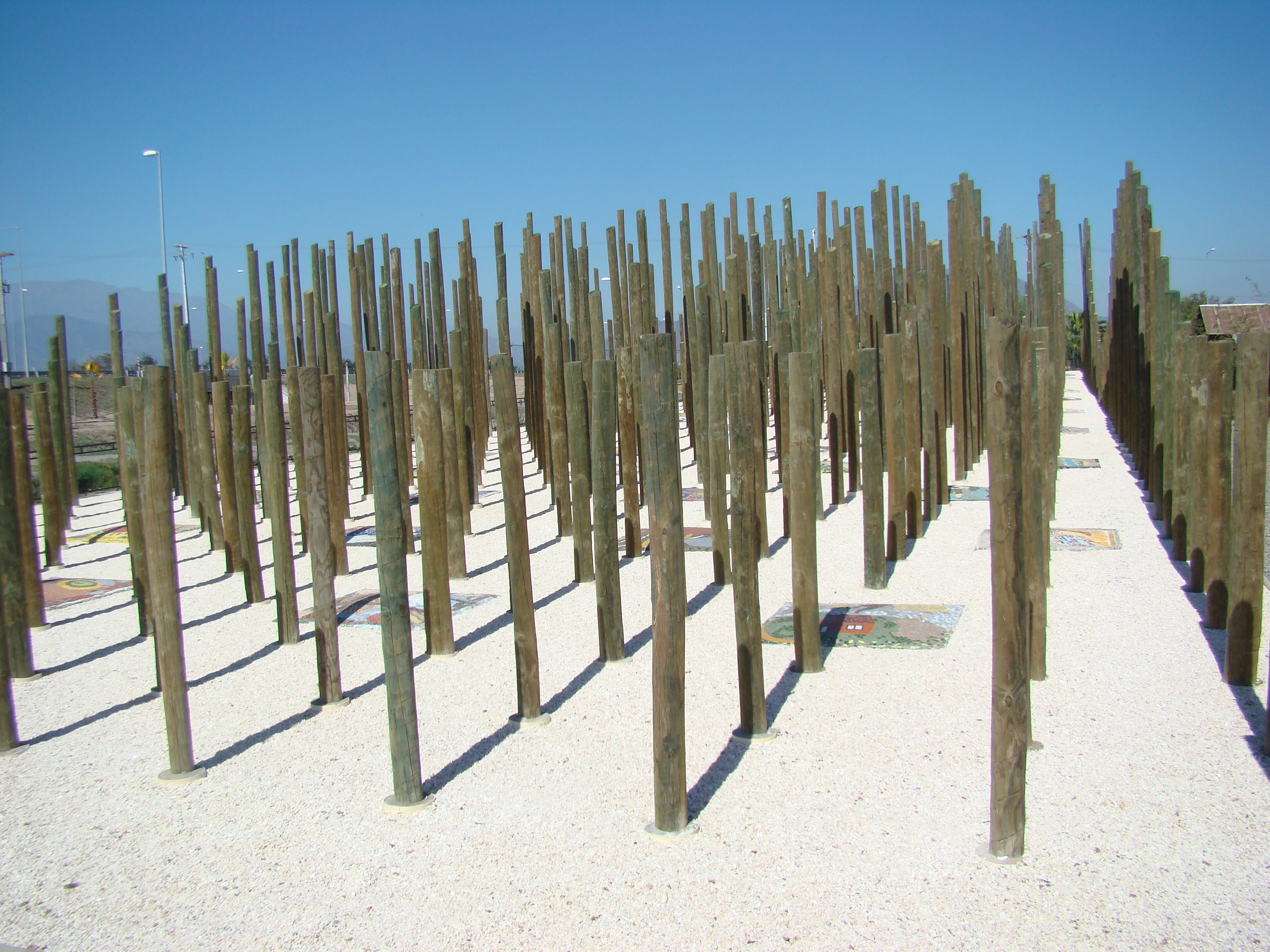
- View of memorial
- Interactive map of the Paine Memorial area

The Paine Memorial is a memorial site built in Paine, a small rural community located twenty miles south of Santiago, Chile. The site commemorates the lives of citizens who were either abducted or unlawfully arrested and subsequently killed by the right-wing military dictatorship directed by Augusto Pinochet from 1974 to 1990 in conjunction with the local right-wing Kast family. The existence of the memorial is a very overdue national acknowledgment of this massacre that occurred in Paine. It represents the need for reconciliation between the Chilean government and those the government has brutally silenced in the past. The goal is to achieve recovery and progress for the three generations of Paine citizens affected by the massacre.

== Physical description ==
The structure is located on a square plot of land with a multi-leveled, stone foundation covered in grey and beige pebbles. There are 930 wooden poles rising out of this foundation, like a "timber forest". Each of the 930 poles represents one descendant, either of the "second generation" (the children of the victims) or the "third generation" (grandchildren of the victims) of one of the people lost in the Paine massacre. There are 1000 spots for poles, but 70 of these spots contain not a pole, but a personalized mosaic for each victim lost in the Paine massacre. The personalized mosaics use symbols and images of the loved one's favorite things to commemorate their lives and personalities.

== Political history leading to the massacre ==
During the 1960s and the years leading up to the massacre in Paine, Chile's political sphere was divided into three distinct ideologies: leftist, centrist, and rightist. The leftists supported socialism, populism, and nationalizing resources, the rightists supported a strong central government and privatizing resources, and the centrists mediated disputes between the two groups. This political divide was deepened by the fact that rural and lower income families were most often leftist, while urban and higher income families were often rightists. It also set the stage for the government takeover of rural lands in the name of political stability. The 1964 presidential election of Christian Democrat Eduardo Frei Montalva by an absolute majority initiated a period of major reform. Under the slogan "Revolution in Liberty", the Montalva administration embarked on far-reaching social and economic programs, particularly in education, housing, and agrarian reform, including rural unionization of agricultural workers. By 1967, however, Montalva encountered increasing opposition from leftists, who charged that his reforms were inadequate, and from conservatives, who found them excessive. Montalva's expropriation of privately owned lands resulted in the destruction of the landowning class of Northern Chile, further damaging the relations between rural communities and the national government. Society changed into an almost feudal relationship between landowning elites and bonded laborers. The agrarian reforms thus led to cooperatives on haciendas. Cooperatives often supported the Socialist Party of Chile, the Christian Democratic Party, and/or political groups such as MAPU and the militant leftist MIR. The Movimiento de Izquierda Revolucionaria (MIR) was especially prevalent in Paine. The group promoted attainment of agrarian reform, organized local families and political parties that create peasant cooperatives through violent means if necessary.

The growing power of these collectives manifested itself in the 1971 cooperative takeover of Rangue hacienda. Initial backlash to this movement included the Chilean government working with the United States CIA to coordinate a trucker strike, effectively making the transportation of goods into and out of rural Chile impossible. Most importantly, however, the political climate created by these events directly led to the rightist military coup by Augusto Pinochet and his supporters.

== Events/ progression of abductions ==
In December 1973, under the Pinochet's dictatorship, bodies of actively political and leftist Paine citizens were found at Cuesta de Chada, an unpopulated valley in Paine. Although they were discovered, out of fear of the government, the discoveries were kept silent by the Paine women who found the bodies. In March 1974, the women finally went to the police to retrieve the bodies, but they were denied. Nobody was allowed recovery of the bodies, and only some received death certificates for their loved ones. This refusal for acknowledgment of the murders and the oppressive, fear-mongering atmosphere established by the dictatorship left the people of Paine unable to mourn due to ongoing political strife. The "second generation" of Paine citizens grew up amidst silenced grief, which often led to anger and depression. The misinformation on the whereabouts of the victims' remains was bald-faced abuse of the Paine people’s basic trust in justice, truth, and the police. Some relatives of the deceased trusted in the authority of the government even after the abductions. Many people in Paine at first thought assumed that the missing people must have done something wrong if they were arrested. From the 1960s until 1973, According to the 1991 Rettig Report, which was prepared by Chile’s National Commission for Truth and Reconciliation, the community of Paine suffered more disappearances per capita than any other Chilean settlement during the years of military dictatorship.

== Breaking of the silence ==
In, 1989 the first march against the abductions/arrest occurred in Paine. A mere six marchers grew to a forty-person protest, and the marchers showed bravery against local police trying to keep them on sidewalks. In response to this public march, in 1990, the Paine police sent the remains of the deceased to the Chilean government and excavations were arranged to find more remains. In 2000, a group called AFDD-Paine (Agrupación de Familiares de Detenidos Desaparecidos y Ejecutados de Paine) was formed to speak out on the events that occurred and to discuss ways to resolve the grief that came with them. The group now meets one month a month, has 30-40 members and spans 3 generations. For eight years, AFDD-Paine worked with the Chilean Ministry of Interior and the Ministry of Public Works to have the memorial constructed in 2008. In 2005, Lieutenant Magana’s October 16 operation resulting in the death of multiple Paine citizens was slated for investigation.

== Ongoing efforts for reconciliation ==
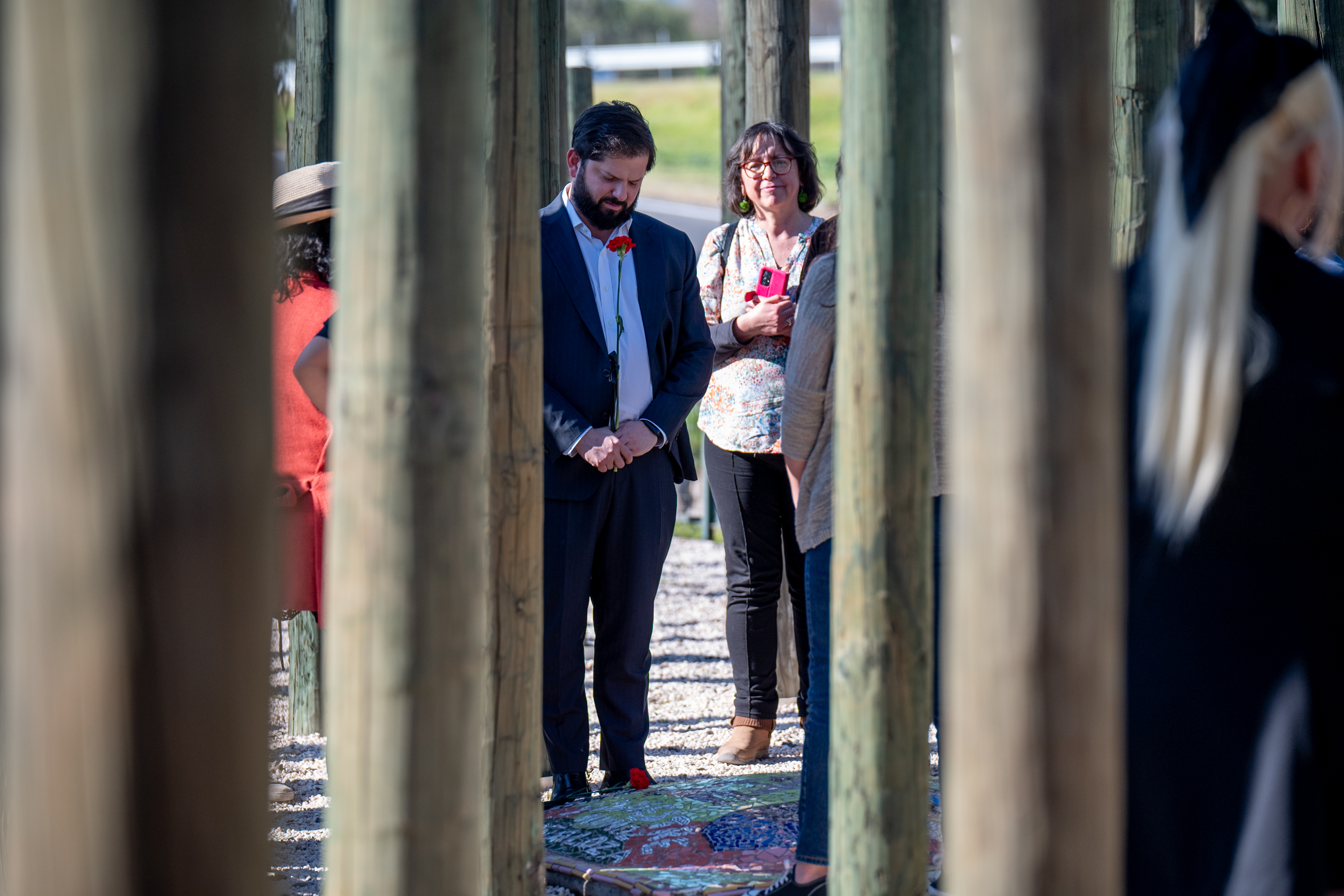
President of Chile Gabriel Boric at the memorial in 2024

Currently, in Paine, the "third generation" (grandchildren of the victims) are working alongside AFDD-Paine to raise awareness on the subject. AFDD-Paine discusses the significance of the group and the memorial as a representation of the unending search for meaning. The memorial is also seen as a nostalgic mourning of the egalitarian trajectory Northern Chile was on before the coup, and so the memorial stirs political discussion and a commitment to national progress. Efforts to make it a living memorial – a space where Paine people can celebrate their unity and commune are ongoing. Currently, management and maintenance of the memorial is conducted out of a temporary trailer like structure, and a petition to turn it into a permanent cultural center is under way.
