= Calera de Tango =

- Commune
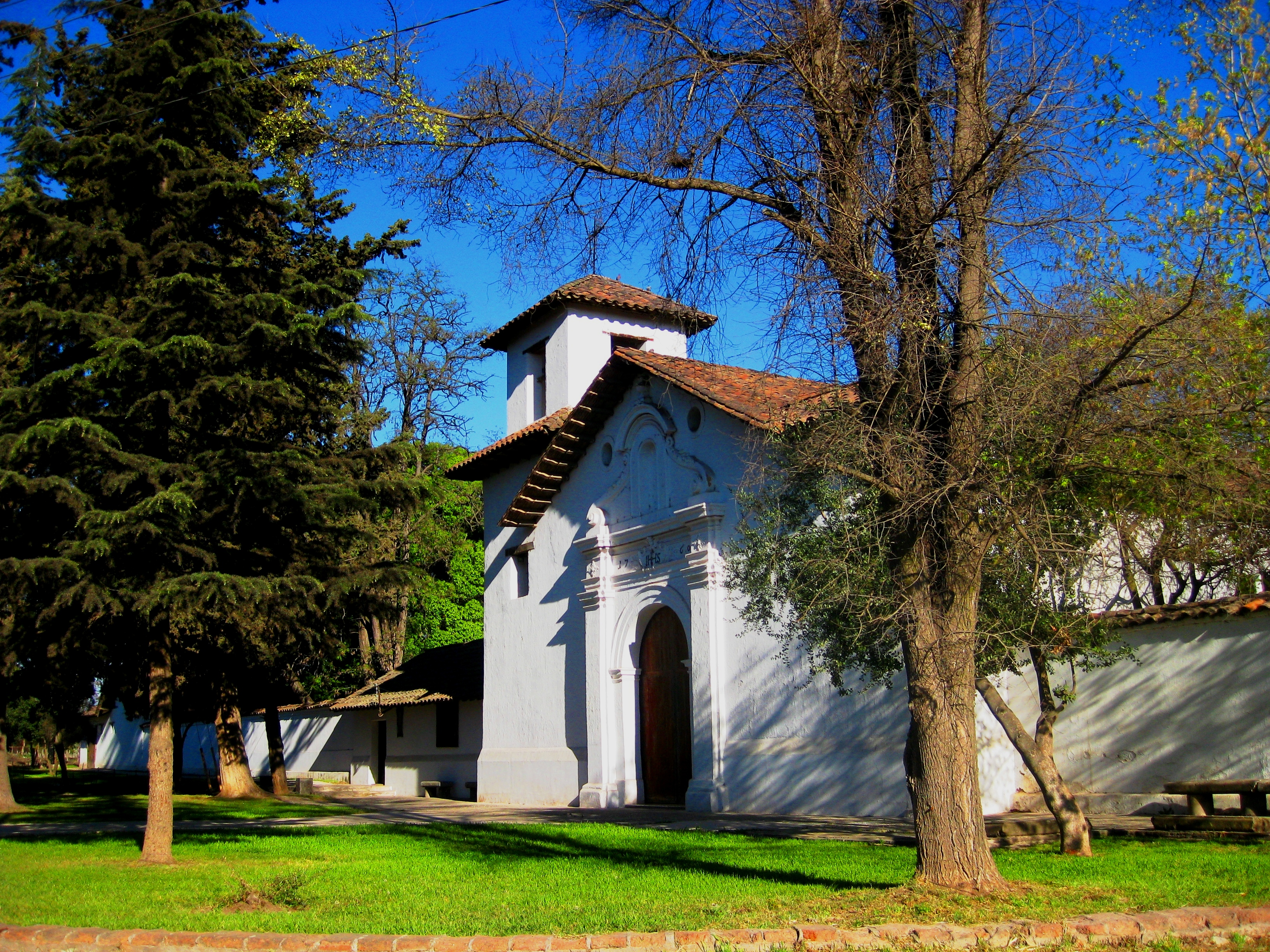
- Iglesia de los jesuitas

- Coat of arms Map of Calera de Tango commune in Santiago Metropolitan Region Location in Chile
- Coordinates (commune): 33°37′48.8″S 70°45′41.9″W
- Country: Chile
- Region: Santiago Metro.
- Province: Maipo

Government
  - Type: Municipality
  - Alcalde: Erasmo Valenzuela Santibáñez (IND)

Area
  - Total: 73.3 km^{2} (28.3 sq mi)

Population (2002 Census)
  - Total: 18,235
  - Density: 249/km^{2} (644/sq mi)
  - Urban: 9,932
  - Rural: 8,303

Sex
  - Men: 9,243
  - Women: 8,992
- Time zone: UTC-4 (CLT)
  - Summer (DST): UTC-3 (CLST)
- Area code: 56 +
- Website: Municipality of Calera de Tango

Calera de Tango is a Chilean commune in the Maipo Province, Santiago Metropolitan Region.

== Demographics ==
According to the 2002 census of the National Statistics Institute, Calera de Tango spans an area of 73.3 km^{2} (28 sq mi) and has 18,235 inhabitants (9,243 men and 8,992 women). Of these, 9,932 (54.5%) lived in urban areas and 8,303 (45.5%) in rural areas. The population grew by 54% (6,392 persons) between the 1992 and 2002 censuses.

== Administration ==
As a commune, Calera de Tango is a third-level administrative division of Chile administered by a municipal council, headed by an alcalde who is directly elected every four years. The 2012-2016 alcalde is Erasmo Valenzuela Santibáñez (IND). The communal council has the following members:

- Juan Irarrazaval Rossel (UDI)
- Marco Jofre Muñoz (PS)
- Carolina Saavedra Rojas (IND)
- Sandra Meza Zumelzu (PS)
- Marcelo Riquelme Yagi (PDC)
- Lilian Farias Nallar (RN)

Within the electoral divisions of Chile, Calera de Tango is represented in the Chamber of Deputies by Ramón Farías (PPD) and José Antonio Kast (UDI) as part of the 30th electoral district, (together with San Bernardo, Buin and Paine). The commune is represented in the Senate by Guido Girardi Lavín (PPD) and Jovino Novoa Vásquez (UDI) as part of the 7th senatorial constituency (Santiago-West).
