= Maipo, Chile =

- Town
- Interactive map of Maipo, Chile
- Coordinates: 33°44′S 70°47′W
- Country: Chile
- Region: Santiago
- Province: Maipo
- Founded: 1583

Maipo is a town that it is part of the city of Buin. It is one of the first towns that arose in Chile, founded in 1583.
