= Trams in Asunción =

Asunción tram system
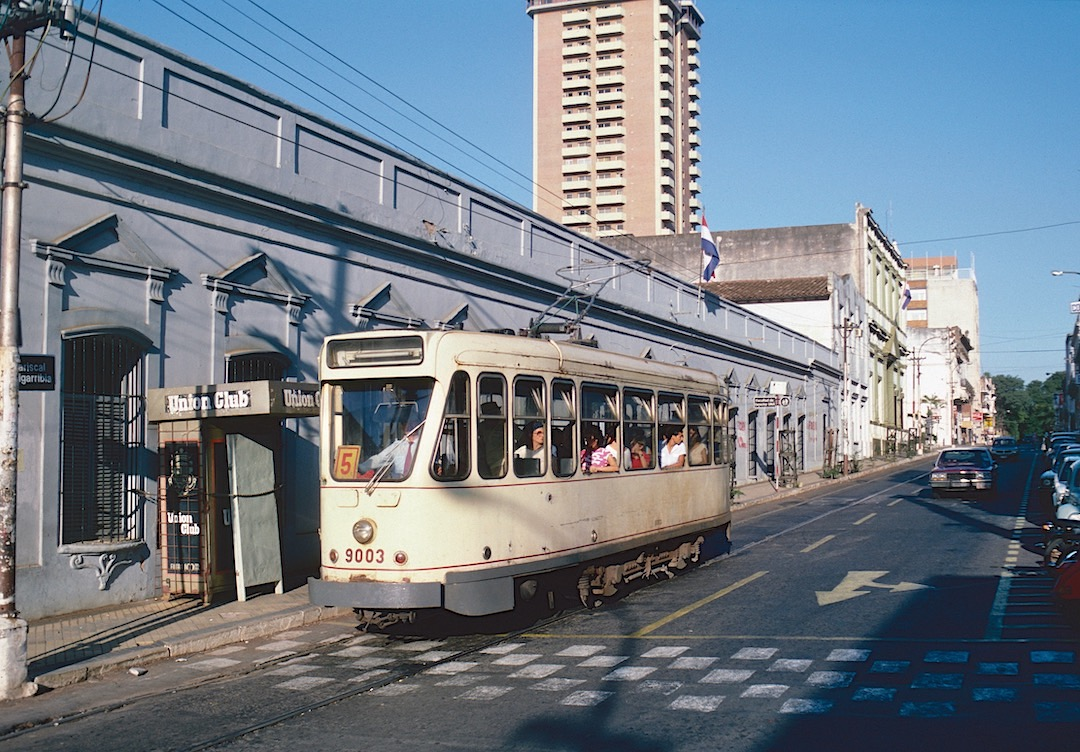
- One of Asunción's ex-Brussels trams on Calle Estigarribia in the city centre in 1986

Operation
- Locale: Asunción, Paraguay
- Open: 1871 (horsecar); 1913 (electric trams)
- Close: 1995/1997

Infrastructure
- Track gauge: 1,435 mm (4 ft 8 1/2 in)
- Propulsion systems: Horse, electric
- Electrification: Overhead line, 600 V DC

Statistics
- Passengers/year: 1.6 million (c. 1985)

The Asunción tramway network (Spanish: Tranvía de Asunción) formed part of the public transport system in Asunción, Paraguay for almost 125 years, from 1871 to 1995. Electric trams were introduced in 1913, eventually replacing the horse-drawn trams used originally. Various private companies built and operated the system until 1948, when the national government took it over. At different times during the period of electric operation, the fleet of trams included cars built by English, American, Italian and Argentinian manufacturers, and during the system's final two decades trams acquired secondhand from the Brussels tram system, in Belgium, provided most of the service. From a maximum extent of 10 routes in the 1930s, the system shrunk to just one route by the end of the 1970s. Service ended around 1995, and the system was formally closed in 1997.

== History ==
The city's first tram line opened in 1871, using horse-drawn trams. Later extensions took the system as far as Villa Morra in the 1880s. In 1894, steam locomotive-hauled trains that ran along city streets in Asunción and used the same tracks as the horsecars extended service beyond Villa Morra to San Lorenzo, 20 km (12 mi) to the southeast. Electric trams were introduced in 1913. In 1914, electric trams replaced steam trains between central Asunción and Villa Morra. (Steam trains continued to operate on the suburban line to San Lorenzo until 1932.)

The first electric tramcars were operated by the Asunción Tramway, Light & Power Company (ATL&P) and were built by the United Electric Car Company, of England. In 1914, the Compañía Americana de Luz y Tracción (CALT) acquired the system after ATL&P's bankruptcy. Six trams were purchased from Società Italiana Ernesto Breda, in Italy, in the 1920s, and later from the American manufacturer J. G. Brill Company and in the 1930s and 1940s from Argentinian builders.

The system reached its maximum extent in the 1930s, with 37 km (23 mi) of track served by 10 routes, worked by a fleet of 33 motor trams and 26 trailers. In 1945, when the direction of traffic flow on several streets in the city centre was reversed, tram lines 1–4 were closed, but CALT built a new line 5, between the city centre and the neighbourhood of Las Mercedes. The system was nationalized in 1948.

The tram system was closed in 1973, but was reopened in 1975, and then-operator Administración del Transporte Eléctrico (ATE) began to import used trams from the Brussels, Belgium, tram system, ultimately acquiring a total of 17 from Brussels by 1980. The 1975 reopening encompassed only route 5, but route 9 to Villa Morra reopened in 1978; however, the latter closed again the following year, leaving only route 5 in operation for the remainder of the system's history. By at least 1977, tram service no longer operated on Sundays, Saturdays after midday, or during siesta (approximately noon to 2 p.m.) on any day. Fares were collected by conductors.

In the early 1980s, the system was reported to be carrying approximately 1.6 million passengers per year. Fodor's Travel Guides' South America 1984 edition mentioned Asunción's "old trolleys" and called them "something preserved from the past that is interesting for youth and reminiscient for elders". The guidebook said that, "President Stroessner is said to have vetoed plans to retire them because of their attraction for tourists and his affinity for the past."

After the mid-1980s, the only tramcars in service were the 9000 series, two-axle ex-Brussels cars built around 1960, with only around five serviceable. In 1986, route 5 was operating on weekdays from approximately 6:30 p.m. to noon and 2:00 p.m. to 6:30 p.m., with 4 cars providing a 15-minute headway. Conductors were still in use.

In 1990, ATE introduced a tram service for tourists, on a loop route that consisted of the downtown section of route 5. It was designated route A – "Circuito Microcentro" (Downtown Loop), and the designation of route 5 was changed to B.

The last public tram service was discontinued around June 1995, the exact date unknown, followed by formal closure in November 1997. The tracks and overhead wires of route B remained usable in 1996 and 1997, and ATE operated a few "charters" (private-hire trips) for foreign railfans during that period, using the only serviceable tram, No. 9007. In the final months of public service, in 1995, only a single car (No. 9007) was still in operation, on the downtown loop route A, which covered only the city centre portion of route B (ex-5), along Calle Palma/Estigarribia (westbound) and Calle Estrella/25 de Mayo (eastbound) between Calle Colón and Calle México (Plaza Uruguaya). Five other cars were at the depot, in need of repair – which was planned, along with reopening of service on route B to La Mercedes, but those plans did not come to fruition. In November 1997, ATE declared the system permanently closed, and by 1998 the overhead wires had been removed.

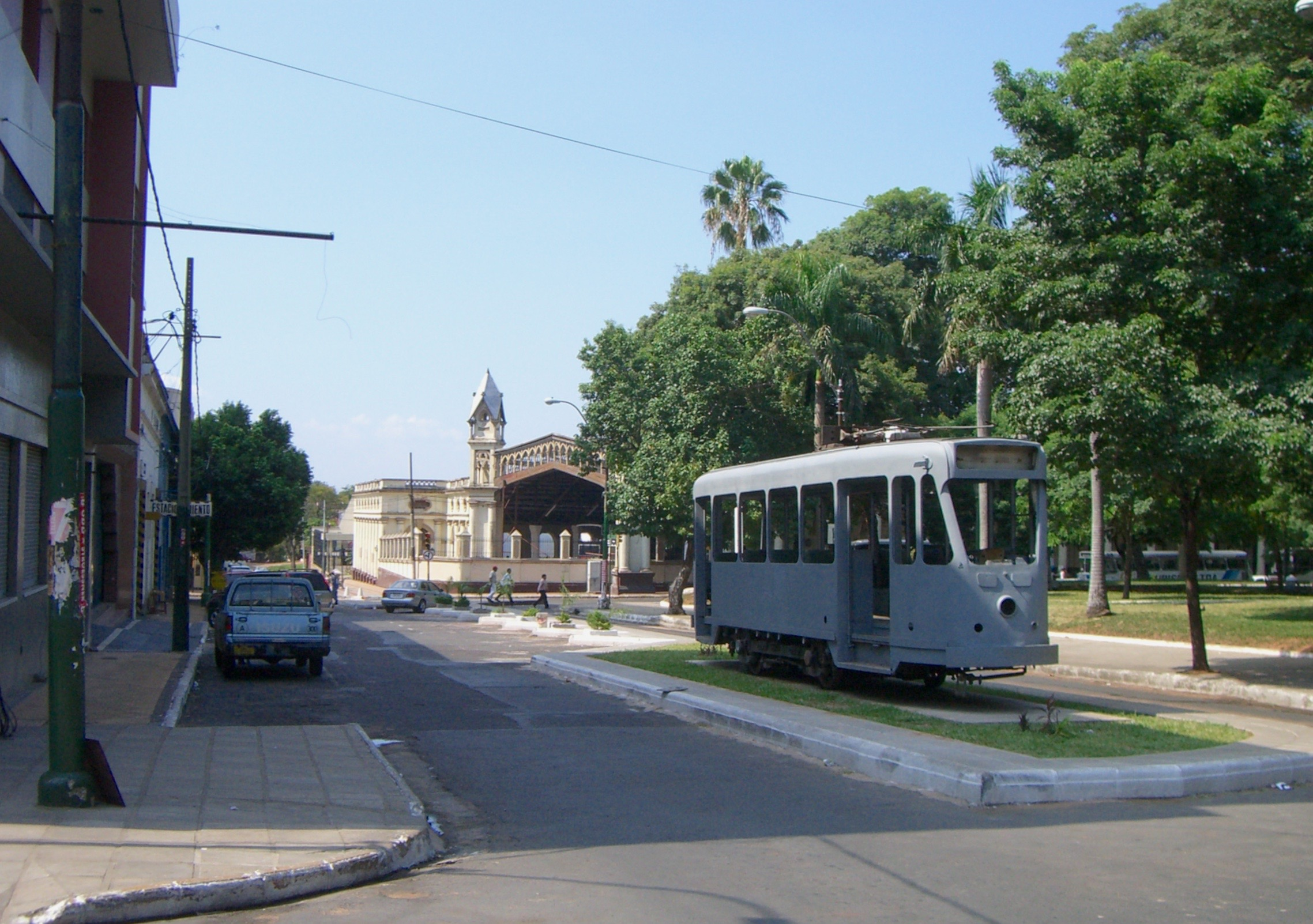
Tramcar 9006 on 'permanent' display in the city centre in 2006, with the former railway station in the background. It remained here for less than 2 years.

In December 2005, tram No. 9006 was placed on display at the west end of Plaza Uruguaya as a memorial to the former tram system. However, after being vandalized in 2007 it was moved to another location.
