= Paine, Chile =

City and Commune in Santiago, Metropolitan Region, Chile

Paine Torris
- City and Commune
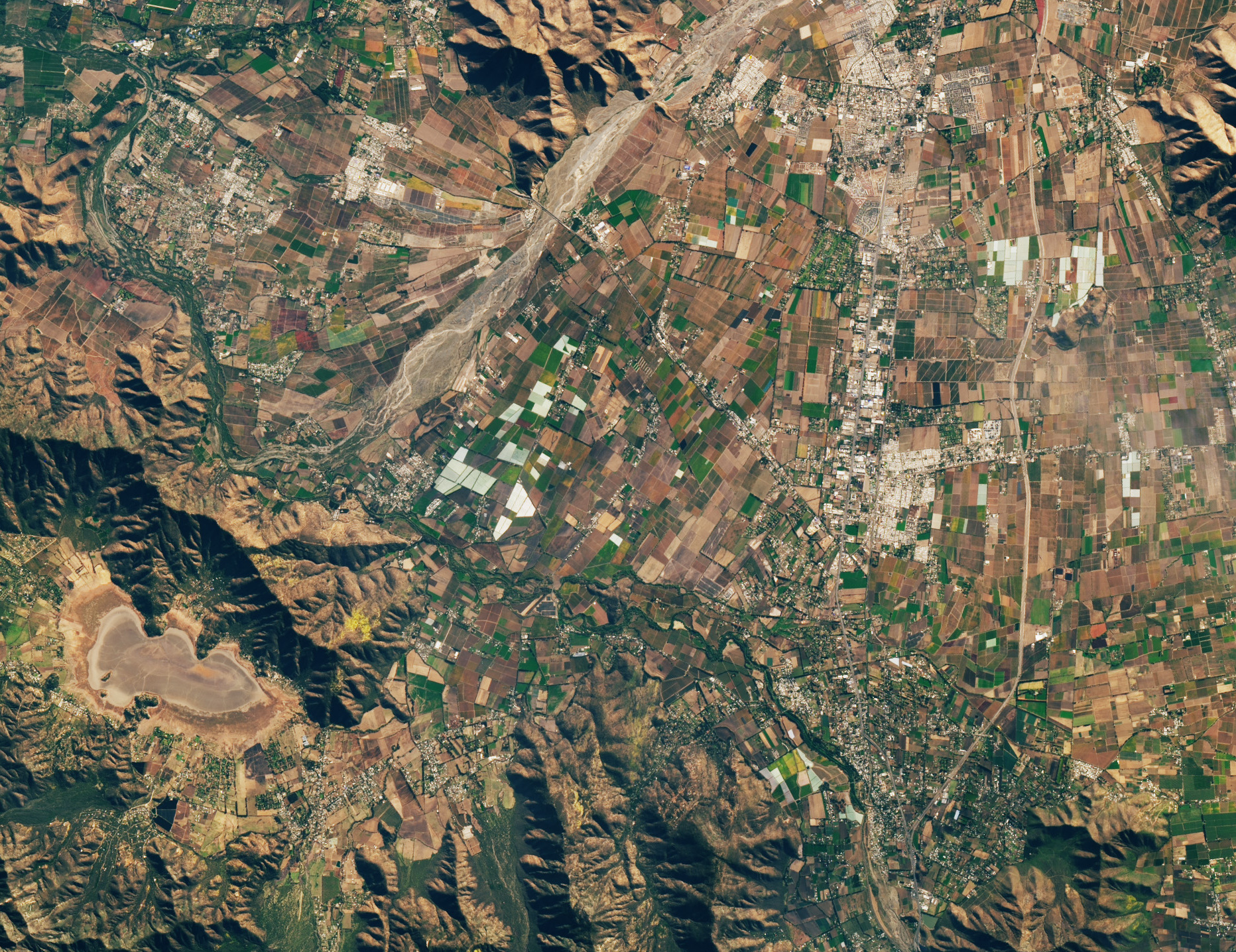
- satelital view of the commune

- Flag Coat of arms Map of the Paine commune in Santiago Metropolitan Region Location in Chile
- Coordinates (city): 33°49′S 70°45′W
- Country: Chile
- Region: Santiago Metro.
- Province: Maipo
- Founded: 1927

Government
  - Type: Municipality
  - Alcalde: Rodrigo Contreras (UDI)

Area
  - Total: 678 km^{2} (262 sq mi)
- Elevation: 409 m (1,342 ft)

Population (2017 Census)
  - Total: 72,759
  - Density: 107/km^{2} (278/sq mi)
- Demonym: Painino
- Time zone: UTC-4 (CLT)
  - Summer (DST): UTC-3 (CLST)
- Area code: 56 +
- Website: Municipality of Paine

Paine (in mapudungún: Payne ‘celestal’) is a Chilean city, forming part of Greater Santiago, and a commune in the Maipo Province, Santiago Metropolitan Region.

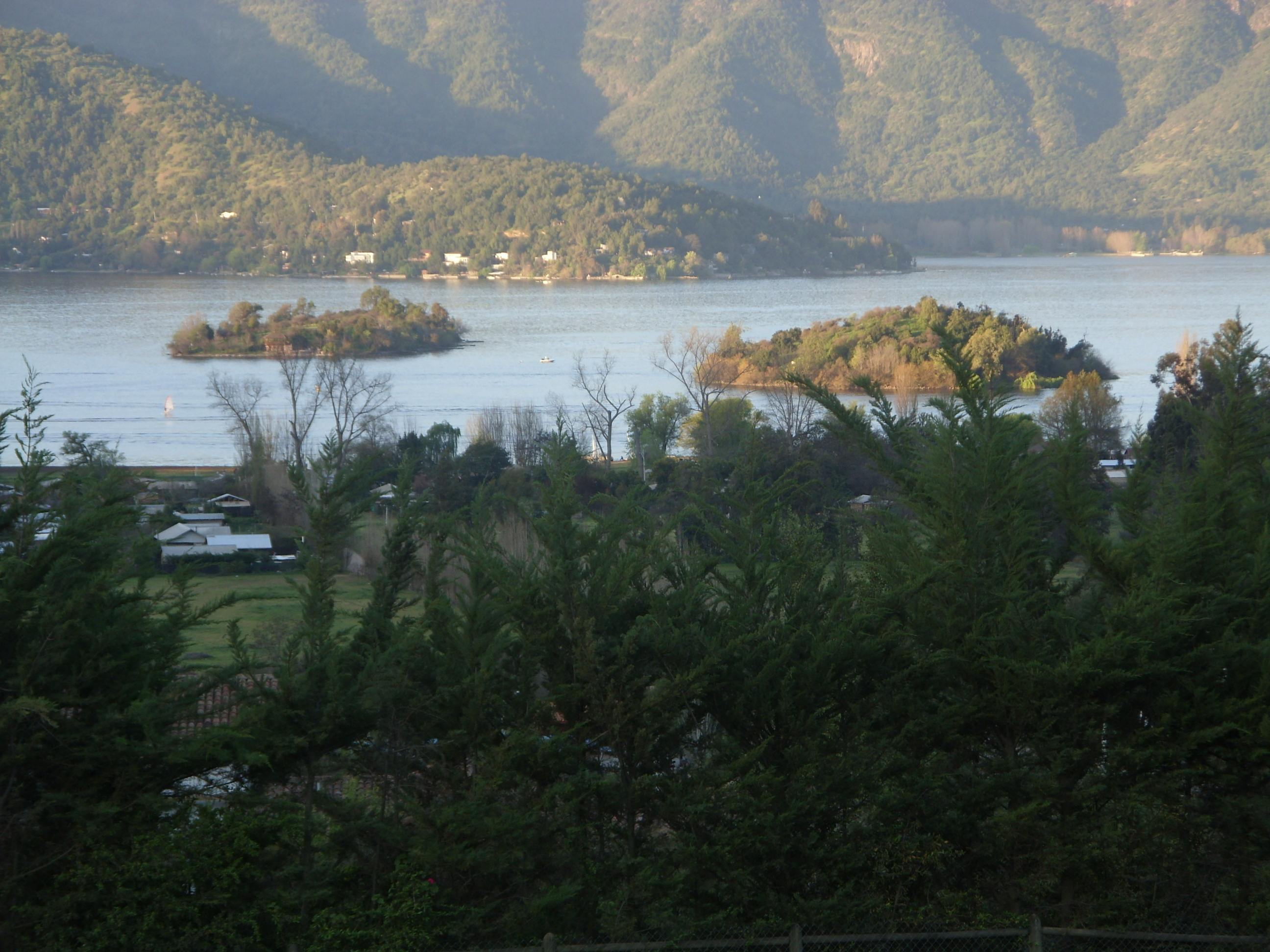
Aculeo lagoon

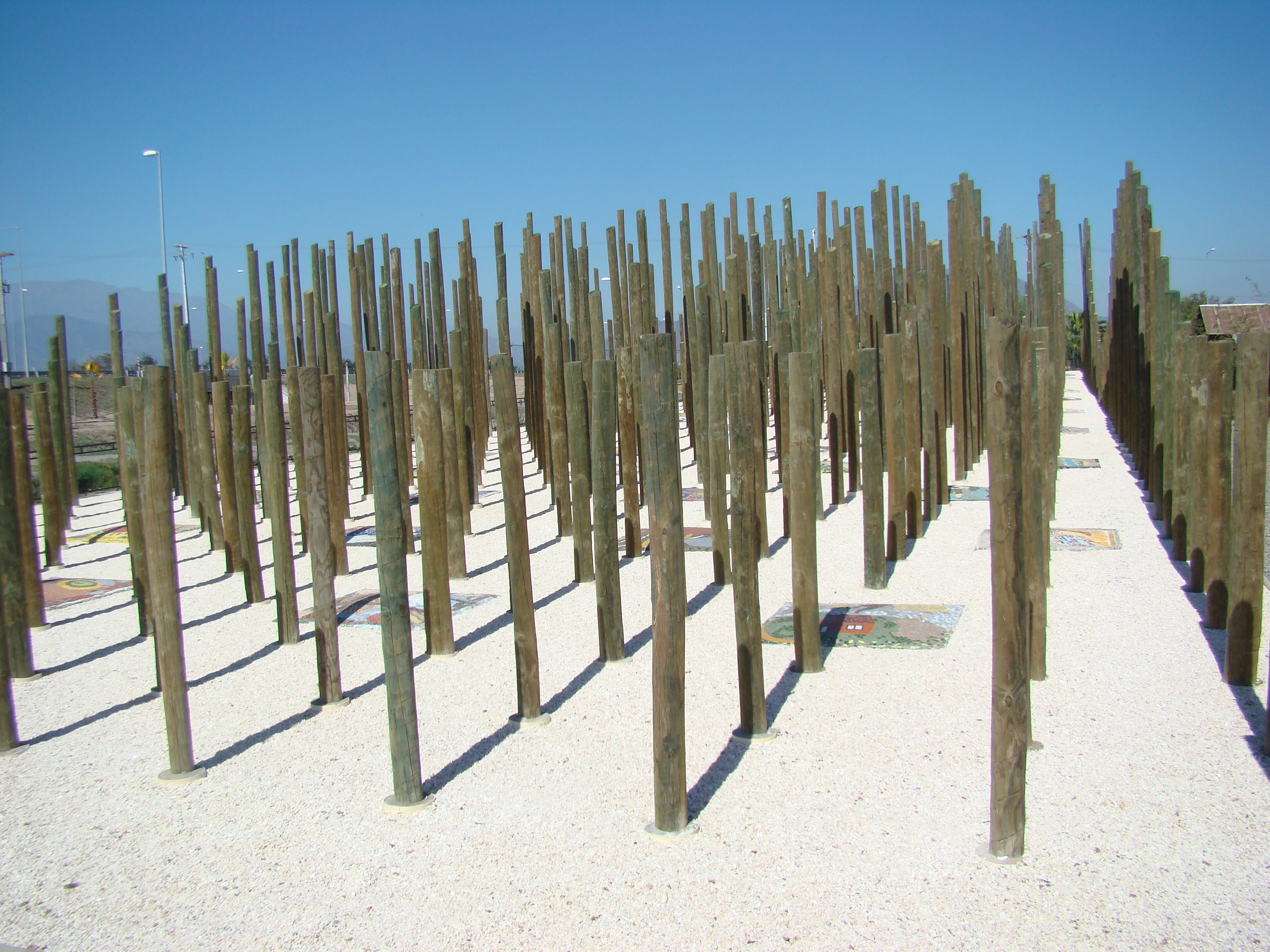
Human Rights memorial

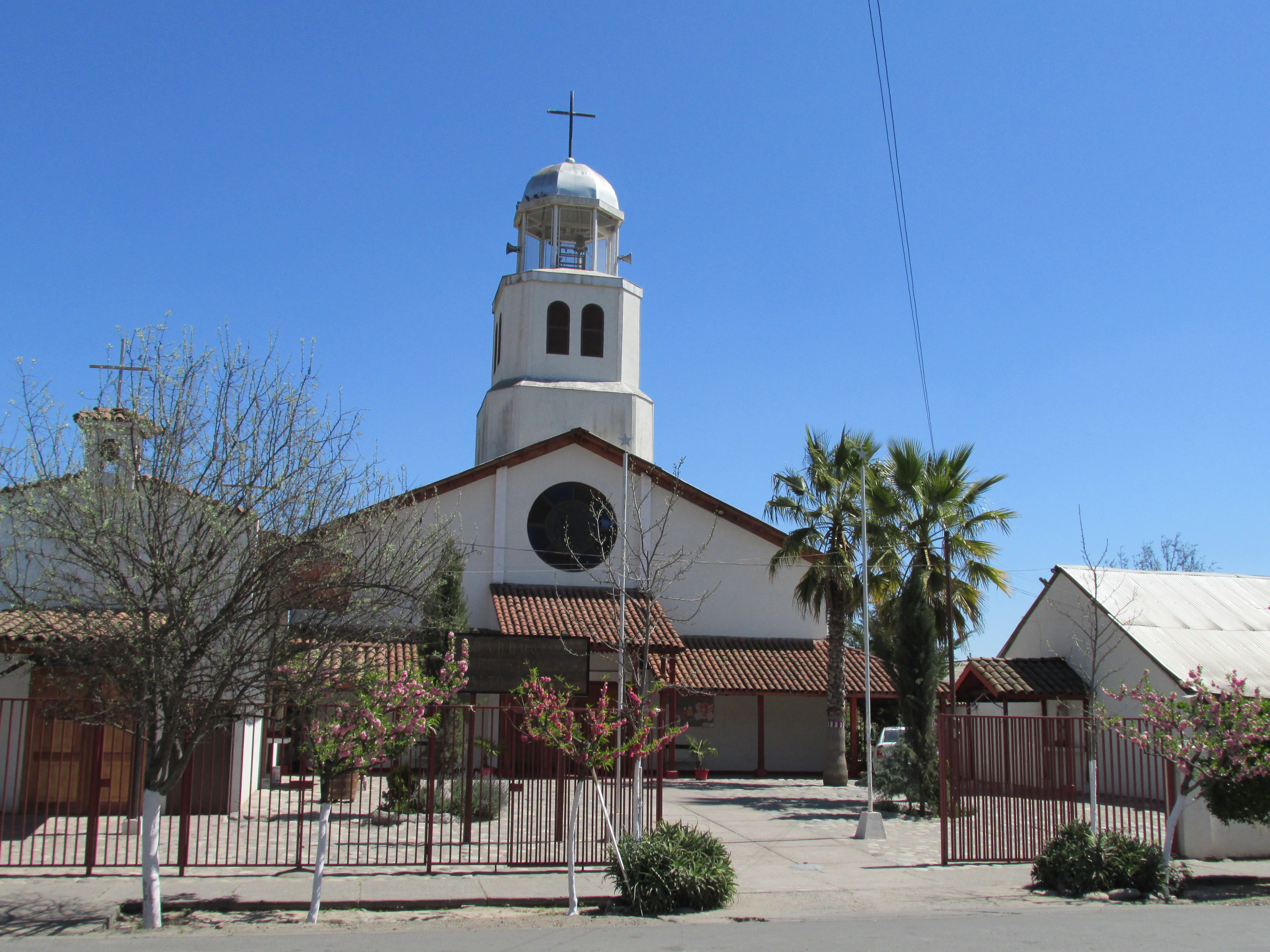
Iglesia Corpus Christi Alto Jahuel

== Origin ==
Although the city of Paine was only officially recognized in 1885, the territory that it comprises today was occupied by original ethnic groups, in particular by Picunches, in whose language, Mapudungun, payne means "celestial".

== Demographics ==
Its population is 72,759 inhabitants (36,521 men and 36,238 women), according to the 2017 Census. Of these, 46,753 (64.3%) lived in urban areas and 26,006 (35.7%) in rural areas. The population grew by 45.44% (22,731 persons) between the 2002 and 2017 censuses, one of the fastest growing in the country.

The following localities, towns or villages belong to the commune of Paine: Rangue, Aculeo, Huelquén, Pintué, Chada, Culitrín, La Parición, Abrantes, El Tránsito, La Paloma, La Trilla, El Vínculo, Liguay, El Escorial, Hospital, Champa, El Palpi, 24 de abril, San Miguel, Colonia Kennedy, Águila Norte and Sur, Las Colonias de Paine.

== History ==
With the arrival of the Spanish, the land was distributed as encomienda to different Spanish conquerors, passing from one owner to another through the years. In particular, a large farm located in the sector belonged to Mrs. Paula Jaraquemada. At that time, the word Paine designated a fairly large area, traces of which are preserved in the names of some towns in the sector (Angostura de Paine, Valdivia de Paine, etc.).

The Paine subdelegation, then belonging to the department of Maipo, was created on November 2, 1885. But the administrative headquarters, originally installed in the town’s hospital, only came to settle in the city of Paine in 1900.

The Chilean geographer Luis Risopatrón describes it as a "lugarejo" in his book Diccionario Jeográfico de Chile in 1924.

On December 30, 1927, Paine became an independent commune, with part of the territory of the former commune of Linderos, and part of the territory of the (then) commune of Valdivia de Paine.

== Geography ==
The total area of the commune extends to 820 km².

=== Boundaries. ===
- To the north, with the commune of Buin;
- To the northwest, with the commune of Isla de Maipo, in the provincia de Talagante;
- To the south, with the commune of Mostazal, of the VI Region of Libertador General Bernardo O'Higgins;
- To the west, with the Melipilla commune of the province of the Melipilla;
- To the southwest, with the commune of Alhué, of the province of Melipilla;

To the east with the commune of Pirque, in the province of Cordillera.

The Aculeo Lagoon was located within the commune of Paine, it was one of the main recreation centers for the people of Santiago and the only natural lagoon in the region. There are various campsites in the sector. In its territory are also the Altos de Cantillana, a natural reserve consisting of high-altitude mountains, whose plants and animals are worthy of interest. In addition, this commune is a place of huasas traditions.

== Connectivity ==
With the North and the center of the central zone, through Route 5. With Santiago, San Bernardo, Buin, Rancagua and San Fernando, through the Rancagua-Central Station Train.

== Economy ==
In general, the economy of the city is based on agriculture. The Paine watermelon is recognized in the Chilean environment for its quality and large size. In recent times, numerous agro-industries have been installed in the sector.

In 2018, the number of companies registered in Paine was 1,590. The Economic Complexity Index (ECI) in the same year was 0.86, while the economic activities with the highest Revealed Comparative Advantage (RCA) index were Cultivation and Gathering of Mushrooms, Truffles and Sap, Production of Maple Syrup and Sugar (298.31), Manufacture of Cocoa and Chocolates (150.51) and Manufacture of Pipes and Hoses for Construction (72.96).5

== Administration ==
=== Municipality ===
As a commune, Paine is a third-level administrative division of Chile administered by a municipal council, headed by a mayor who is directly elected every four years. The 2021-2024 mayor is Rodrigo Contreras Gutiérrez (UDI), while the communal council has the following members:

- Marco San Martin Zdrazil (PS)
- Jorge Molina Silva (Ind.)
- Cecilia Altamirano Vivanco (EVOP)
- Esteban Calderon Salas (RN)
- Claudia Ahumada Arias (UDI)
- Paulina Calderón Jara (PCCh)

=== Parliamentary representation ===
Paine belongs to Electoral District No. 14 together with Talagante, Peñaflor, El Monte, Melipilla, María Pinto, Curacaví, Alhué, San Pedro, Padre Hurtado, Buin, Calera de Tango, San Bernardo, and Isla de Maipo. It is represented in the Chamber of Deputies of the National Congress for the 2022-2026 term by the following deputies:

- Marisela Santibáñez (PCCh)
- Camila Musante (Ind./AD)
- Raúl Leiva (PS)
- Leonardo Soto (PS)
- Juan Antonio Coloma (UDI)
- Juan Irarrázaval (REP)

In turn, Paine belongs to the 7th Senatorial District (Metropolitan Region) and in the Senate is represented by Fabiola Campillai (Ind.), Claudia Pascual (PCCh), Luciano Cruz-Coke (EVOP), Manuel José Ossandon (RN) and Rojo Edwards (PSC) for the 2022-2030 term.

== Culture and Society. ==
As it is essentially a peasant tradition, the celebration of National Holidays in mid-September should also be highlighted. Paine is one of the few metropolitan communes that still maintains in some of its localities the old tradition of installing ramadas; that is, typical food and drink outlets covered by tree branches. In addition, Creole activities such as hopscotch competitions, threshing and traditional games such as greasy pole and rope throwing are maintained.

=== Little Town of Champa Cultural Corporation ===
The cultural group was born in the town of Champa in 2019 with the aim of promoting the arts and culture in the rural area of south-west Paine. With the passage of time, the group was gaining popularity and becoming known throughout the province thanks to the quality and dedication of its work.

They are currently developing the project to build a Cultural Center and Theater in what was the old Elías Sánchez de Champa School, which suffered severe damage during the 2010 earthquake.

=== Expo Paine Rural ===
In the month of January, in Paine two traditional celebrations are held. The first is the Expo Paine Rural (formerly known as the Watermelon Festival), which brings together the best producers in the area, artisans, cooks and gourmets in more than 100 exhibitor stands. There are three days of celebration (Friday afternoon, Saturday and Sunday of the second week of the month) in which the different traditions of the Chilean countryside are presented to the public, bringing them closer to the most popular activities of the rural world.

The Paine Expo seeks to bring the tourist closer to the commune and its traditions, which include historical peasant practices. Additionally, the contest for the best watermelon of the season is held on the final day, Sunday. A jury of specialists judging the flavor, color, texture and sweetness decide the "King or Queen of the Watermelon" and which constitutes one of the most important points of the Expo.

=== Watermelon Festival. ===
Secondly, and a week after the Expo Paine Rural, the Watermelon Festival takes place, which consists of a local voice festival. In it, they compete in different categories (international, folkloric and ranchero-Mexican) in which every painino has the right to participate, after registering with their neighborhood council in order to be part of one of the three local festivals (held in the eastern, central and western areas of the commune) qualifiers for the great Watermelon Festival, which usually takes place on Friday and Saturday of the third week of January, the place where both the festival and the expo are held is in the municipal stadium of said commune located at Avenida 18 de Septiembre No. 115.

Apart from the local competitions, great national guests also participate in the festival, such as Los Jaivas, Américo, Los Bunkers, Chancho en Piedra, Los Tres and Joe Vasconcellos, who have accompanied local artists, which on many occasions has served as a prelude to the Viña del Mar Festival.

=== Monuments ===
The Paine Memorial to the Detained, Disappeared and Executed is a tribute to the seventy victims of human rights violations during the military dictatorship that was imposed in Chile from 1973 to 1990. Its author is the artist Alejandra Ruddoff. It was inaugurated on May 25, 2008.

== Media ==
FM

- 103.7 MHz - Caramelo
- 106.1 MHz - Golondrina
- 106.3 MHz - Fantasía
- 106.7 MHz - Abigail
- 107.3 MHz - Jemima
- 107.9 MHz - La Voz de Paine

== See also ==
- Laguna de Aculeo
- Paine Memorial
