= Telén =

Coordinates: 36°16′S 65°30′W

- Rural locality and village
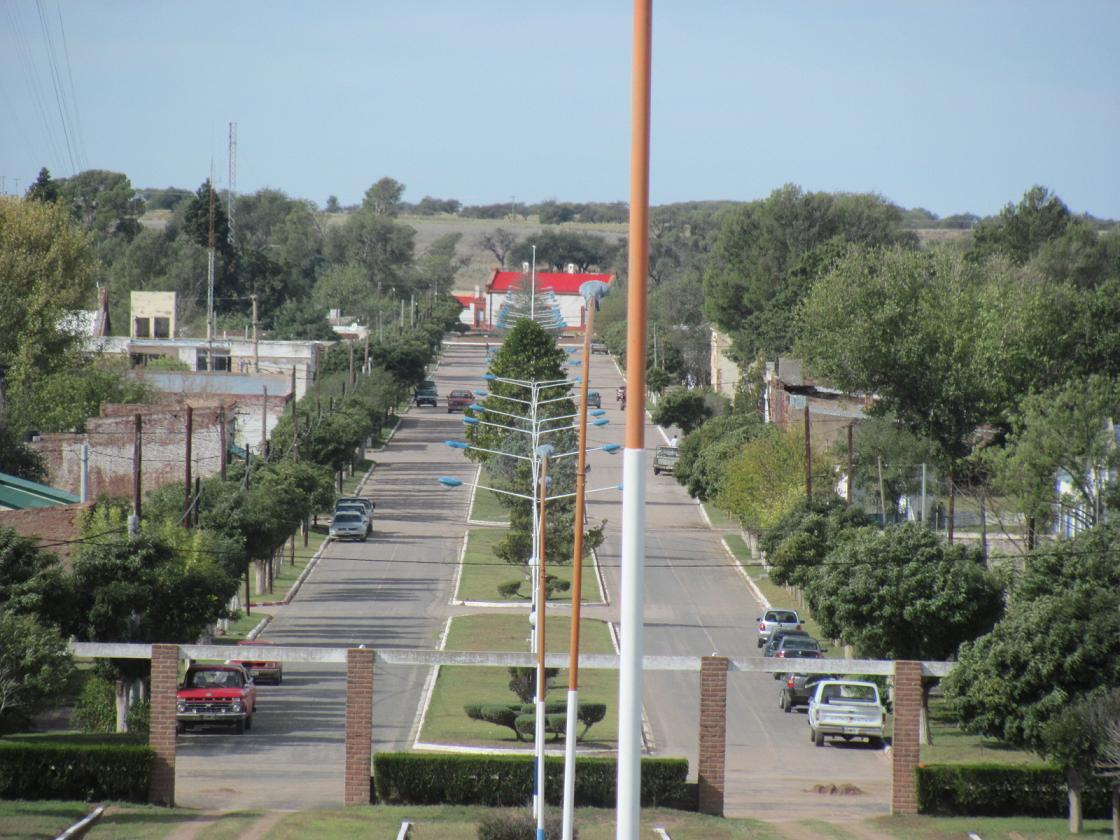
- Interactive map of Telén
- Country: Argentina
- Province: La Pampa
- Department: Loventué
- Time zone: UTC−3 (ART)

Telén is a village and rural locality (municipality) in La Pampa Province in Argentina.
