= San Bernardo, Chile =

San Bernardo
- Commune
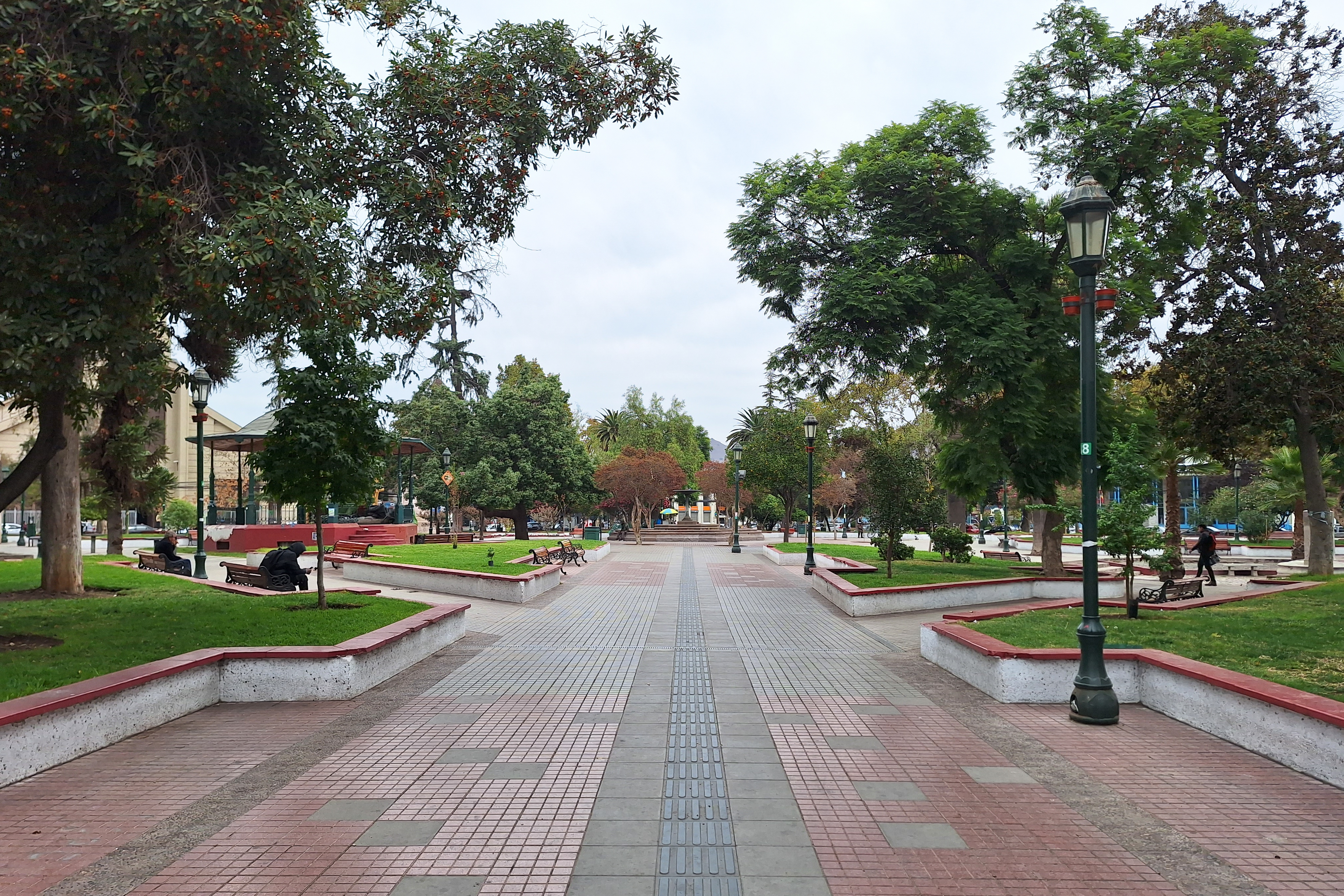
- Plaza de San Bernardo in 2024

- Flag Coat of arms Location of San Bernardo within Greater Santiago Location in Chile
- Coordinates (city): 33°35′S 70°42′W
- Country: Chile
- Region: Santiago Metropolitan
- Province: Maipo
- Founded: 1821

Government
  - Type: Municipality
  - Alcalde: Christopher White Bahamondes (PS)

Area
  - Total: 155.1 km^{2} (59.9 sq mi)
- Elevation: 570 m (1,870 ft)

Population (2024)
  - Total: 306,371
  - Density: 1,975/km^{2} (5,116/sq mi)
  - Urban: 301,997
  - Rural: 4,374
- Time zone: UTC-4 (CLT)
  - Summer (DST): UTC-3 (CLST)
- Area code: +56
- Website: Municipality of San Bernardo

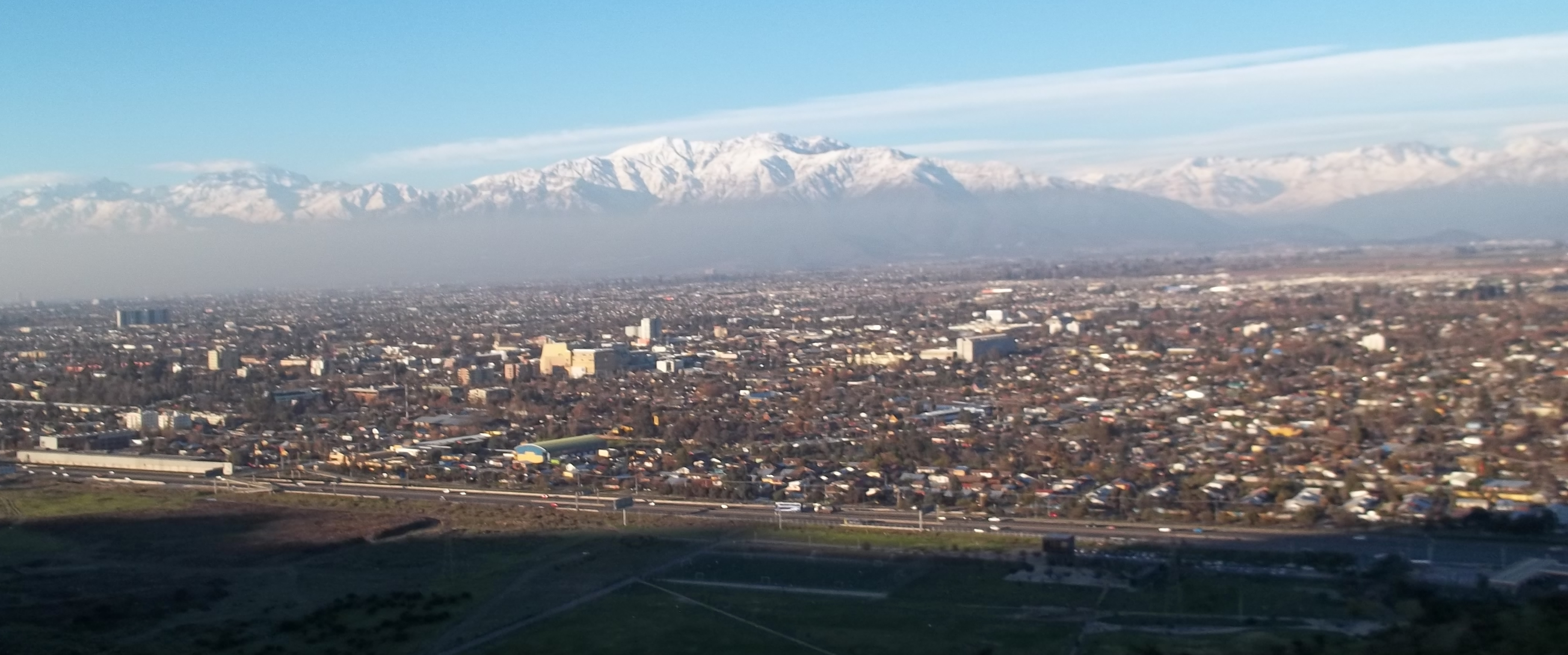
Panoramic view in 2013

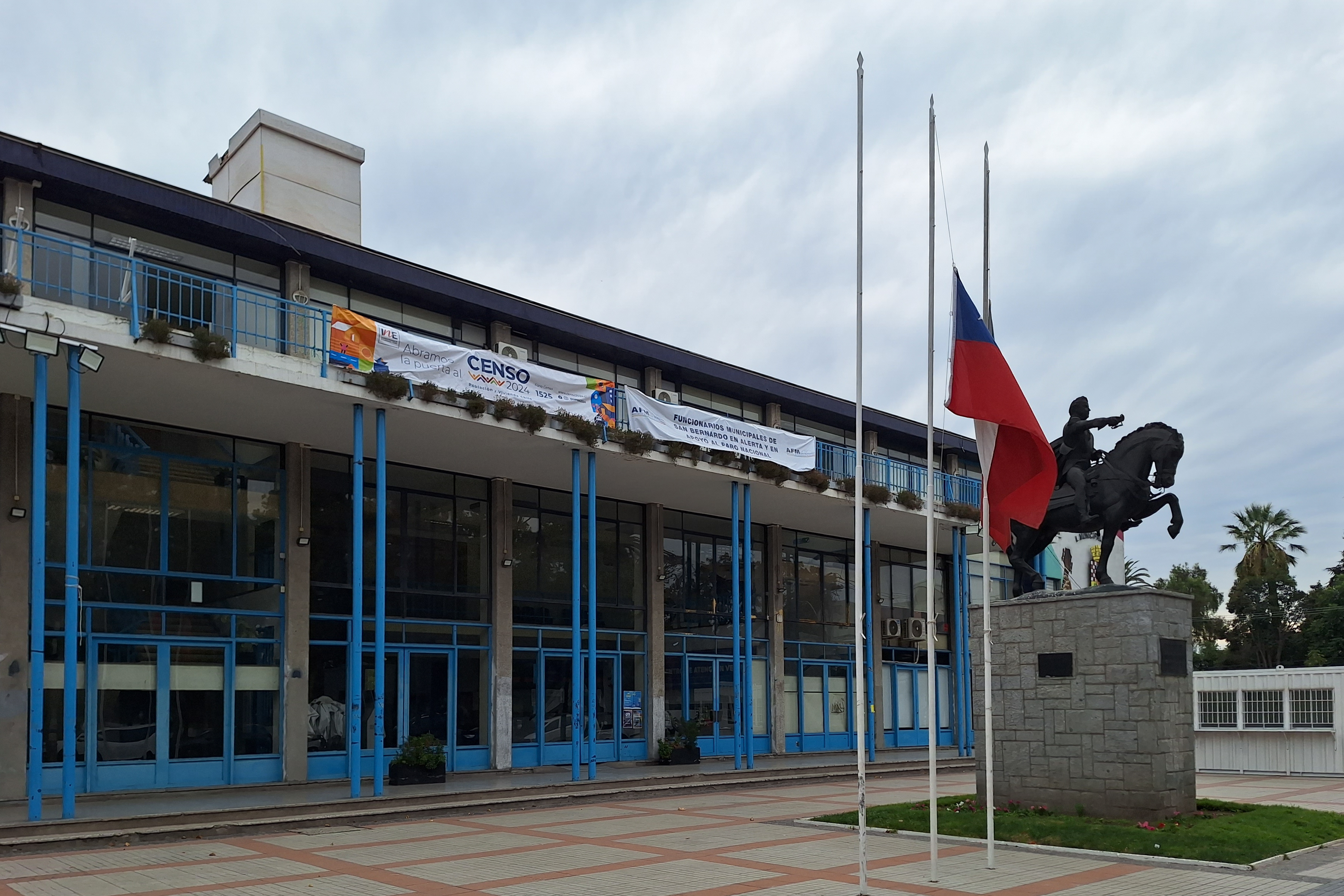
City Hall

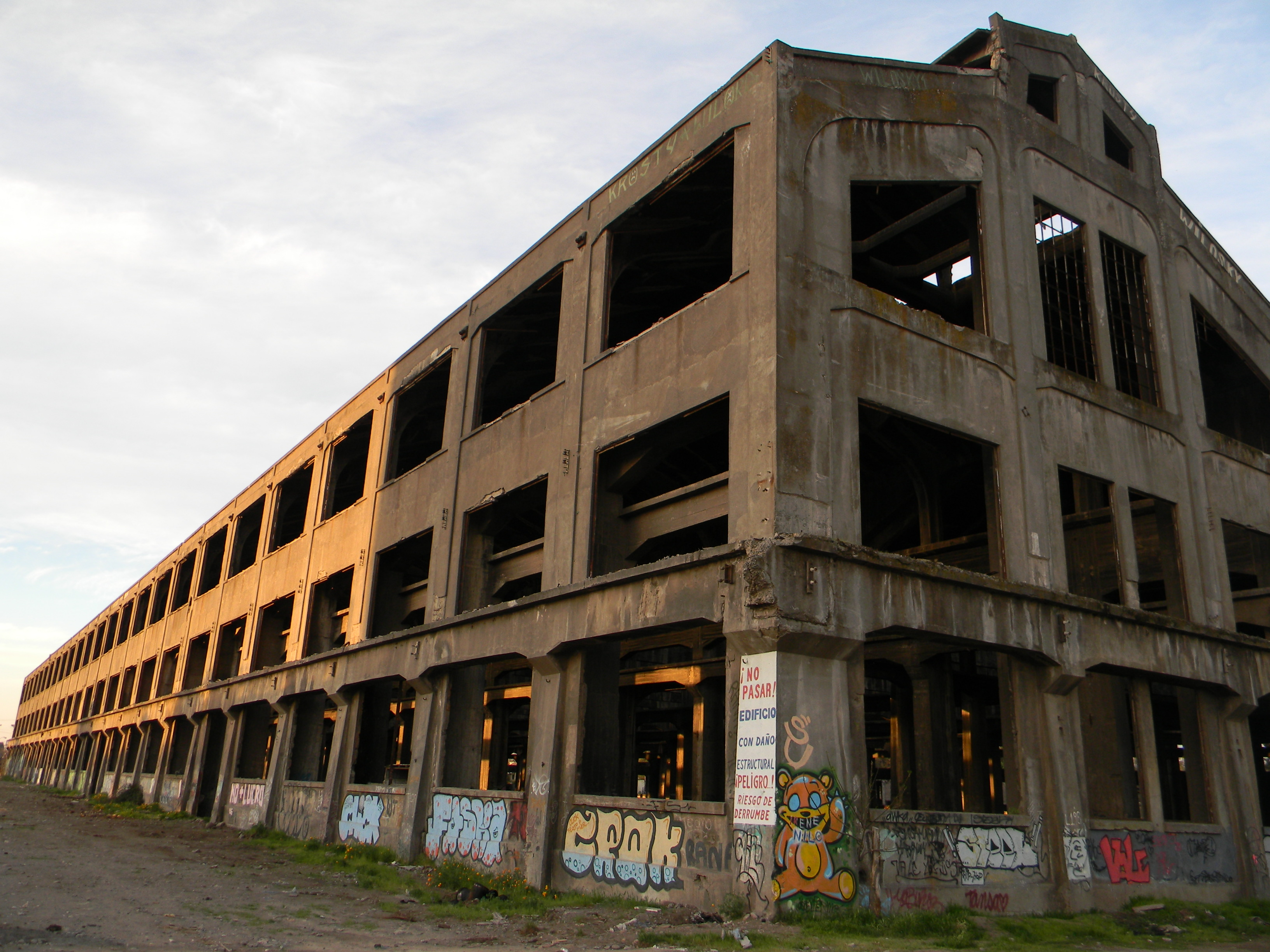
Maestranza

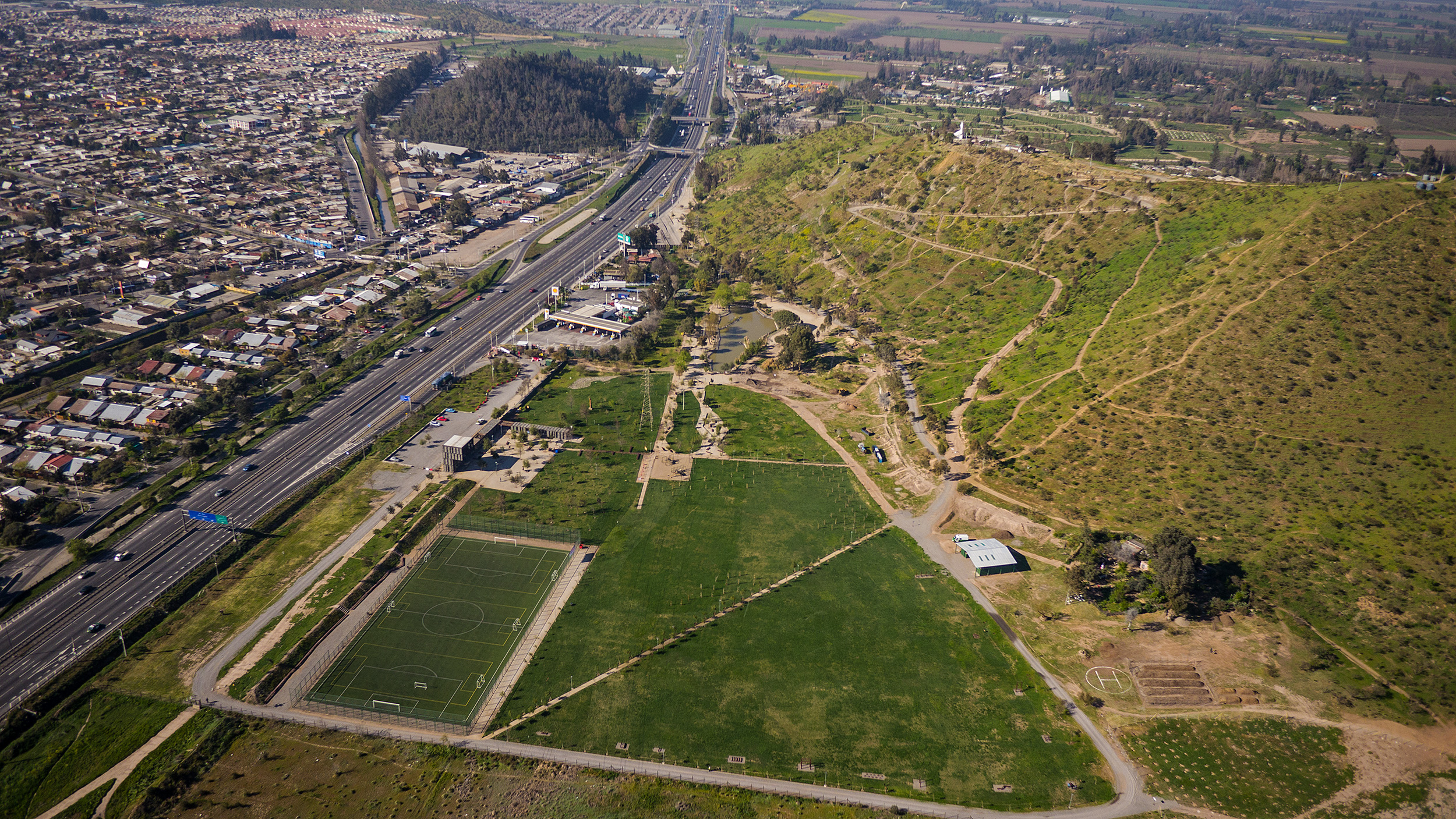
Chena Hill and Autopista Central

San Bernardo (Spanish pronunciation: [sam beɾˈnaɾðo]) is a commune of Greater Santiago, in the Santiago Metropolitan Region in Chile. It is the capital of Maipo Province. San Bernardo also serves as the seat of the Roman Catholic Diocese of San Bernardo. It is the 5th most populous commune in Greater Santiago, with 306,371 inhabitants as of 2024.

== Administration ==
As a commune, San Bernardo is a third-level administrative division of Chile administered by a municipal council, headed by an alcalde who is directly elected every four years. The 2024-2028 alcalde is Christopher White Bahamondes (PS). The council has the following members:

- Carolina Fuentealba Aguilar (REP)
- María Núñez García (REP)
- Juan Rivera Herrera (REP)
- Marcela Cristina Novoa Sandoval (RN)
- Mariela Andrea Araya Cuevas (UDI)
- Karina Soledad Leyton Espinoza (PS)
- Romina Andrea Baeza Illanes (FA)
- Leonel Bernardo Navarro Ormeño (PR)
- Jaime López Muñoz (PAVP)
- Cristina Andrea Cofré Guerrero (PC)

Within the electoral divisions of Chile, San Bernardo is represented in the Chamber of Deputies by Ramón Farías (PPD) and José Antonio Kast (UDI) as part of the 30th electoral district, (together with Buin, Paine and Calera de Tango). The commune is represented in the Senate by Guido Girardi Lavín (PPD) and Andrés Allamand (RN) as part of the 7th senatorial constituency (Santiago-West).

== Demographics ==
As of the 2024 census, the population is 306,371, of which 48.5% are males, and 51.5% are females. People aged under 15 years old make up 19.8% of the population, and people aged 65 years old and over make up 11.3%. 98.6% of the population is urban and 1.4% is rural.

Historical population

Year	Pop.	±% p.a.
1875	10,593	—
1885	10,438	−0.15%
1895	13,187	+2.37%
1907	13,688	+0.31%
1920	17,152	+1.75%
1930	23,029	+2.99%
1940	30,345	+2.80%

Year	Pop.	±% p.a.
1952	50,958	+4.41%
1970	79,150	+2.48%
1982	129,127	+4.16%
1992	190,857	+3.98%
2002	246,762	+2.60%
2017	301,313	+1.34%
2024	306,371	+0.24%

Source: INE, Memoria Chilena

- Average annual household income: US$16,035 (PPP, 2009)
- Population below poverty line: 20.9% (2006)

=== Ethnic minorities ===
As of the 2024 census, Indigenous peoples make up 9.5% of the population, and Afro-Chileans make up 1.2%.

=== Religion ===
As of the 2024 census, 70.7% of the population over 15 years old are Christians (46.0% Catholics, 22.0% Evangelicals or Protestants, and 2.7% other branches), 0.1% are Jews, 0.1% are Muslims, 0.1% are Buddhists, 0.02% are Hinduists, 0.7% are adrehents of other religions, and 28.4% are irreligious.

=== Immigration ===
As of the 2024 census, immigrants make up 6.4% of the population – 4.6% are from South America, 1.6% from North America, 0.1% from Europe, 0.1% from Asia, 0.003% from Africa, and 0.003% from Oceania.

== Culture ==
At a national level, San Bernardo is known as the capital of Chilean folkloric traditions. This distinction is primarily attributed to two annual events held in the commune: the "Festival Nacional del Folklore de San Bernardo" (English: San Bernardo's National Festival of Folklore) and "Abril Cuecas Mil" (English: A Thousand Cuecas April).

=== Festival Nacional del Folklore ===
The Festival Nacional del Folklore de San Bernardo has been held at the end of February since 1972 and draws participants and spectators from all around the country. The festival consists of performances of traditional and folkloric Chilean music, dance and songs, as well as competitions held at the school, corporate and community levels. It also features participants from other countries who are invited to showcase their respective folkloric traditions. An additional part of the festivals is the "Feria de Artesanía Tradicional" (English: Traditional Crafts Fair"), which centers around showcasing and promoting traditional artisanal gastronomy, arts and crafts from Chile and other Latin American cultures.

=== Abril Cuecas Mil ===
Abril Cuecas Mil started in 1993 and is held annually on the last Saturday of April. First proposed by professor Arturo García Araneda, a San Bernardino folklorist, the event centers around Cueca, Chile's national dance. The event lasts for around 30 continuous hours and consists of a line-up of musicians, bands, or folkloric groups playing a thousand Cuecas for an open floor, where anyone is welcomed to partake in the dancing. Participants range from enthusiasts and amateurs to professional and trained dancers. The style of Cueca usually alternates between more traditional folkloric styles during the day (e.g., salon, campesina, etc.) and more risqué styles during the night (e.g., porteña, brava, etc.).

== Chena's Pucará ==
The Chena hills, located in the basin of San Bernardo, are home to an Incan sacred site known as the Huaca of Chena or Chena's Pucará. Initially thought to be a fortress, the structure in the southern tip of the Chena hills has been denominated as a huaca (Quechuan Wak'a), which is a sacred place and a space of ritual use. The Chena's Pucará was observed to have a zoomorphic design, resembling a puma, which is a characteristic of Incan ceremonial and sacred structures. The word Chena (the name of the hills) means puma in oestrous cycle in the Quechuan language.

Subsequent investigations have further supported the sacred denomination by revealing the structure to be composed of three separate edifications; an outside perimetral wall, a middle perimetral wall and the central enclosure, all which are consistent with Incan architectural tripartition designs. Furthermore, the principle structure's design is consistent with the structural designs of Incan Ushnu (place of observation). This observatory status has been confirmed by the structure's seemingly perfect lineation of its altar with the first ray of sun during the winter solstice (21 June) and the summer solstice (21 December).

Currently, the commune of San Bernardo lacks the resources to establish proper administration, maintenance, or security for the area, and Chena's Pucará is facing physical abandonment, neglect, and vandalism, including the dismantling of walls and defecation on the altar. However, in recent years Quechuan and Aymará populations have become interested in negotiating with the authorities for ritualistic and occupation rights in the area.

== Sports ==
- San Bernardo Unido
- Atlético San Bernardo
