= Buin, Chile =

Buin
- City and Commune
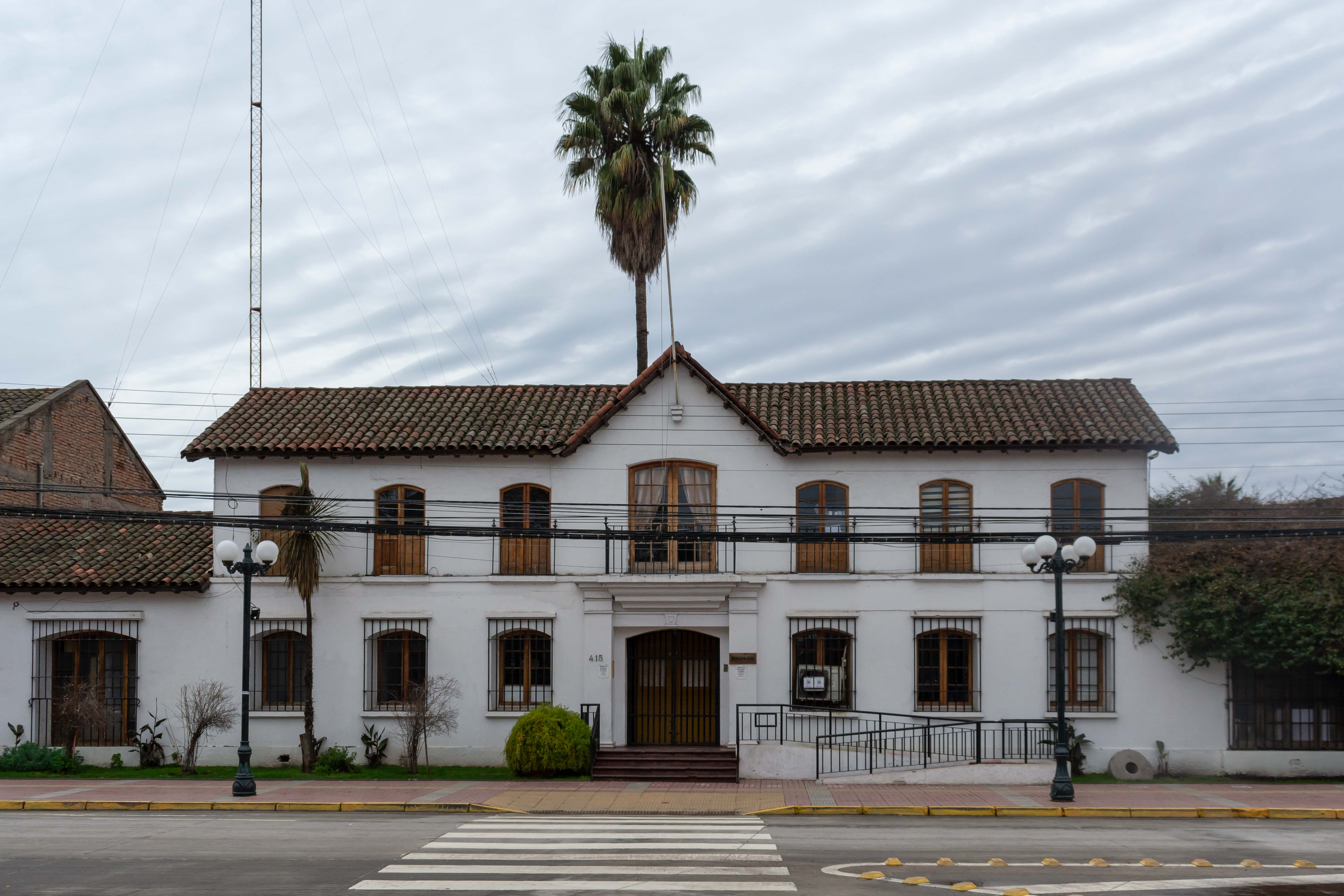
- City Hall

- Coat of arms Map of Buin commune in the Santiago Metropolitan Region Location in Chile
- Coordinates (city): 33°44′S 70°44′W
- Country: Chile
- Region: Santiago
- Province: Maipo
- Founded: 1844

Government
  - Type: Municipality
  - Alcalde: Ángel Bozán Ramos (IND)

Area
  - Total: 214.1 km^{2} (82.7 sq mi)
- Elevation: 483 m (1,585 ft)

Population (2017 census)
  - Total: 96,614
  - Density: 451.3/km^{2} (1,169/sq mi)

Sex
  - Men: 47,575
  - Women: 49,039
- Time zone: UTC−4 (CLT)
  - Summer (DST): UTC−3 (CLST)
- Area code: 56 +
- Website: Municipality of Buin

Buin is a city and commune of Chile, in the Maipo Province, Metropolitan Region of Santiago, which forms part of Greater Santiago. It is a city composed of the towns of Maipo, Viluco, Linderos, Valdivia de Paine, Alto Jahuel, Los Guindos, El Recurso, Olate City, Buinsky city and Campusano. Buin is located about 35 km (22 mi) south of Santiago in the Maipo Valley wine region.

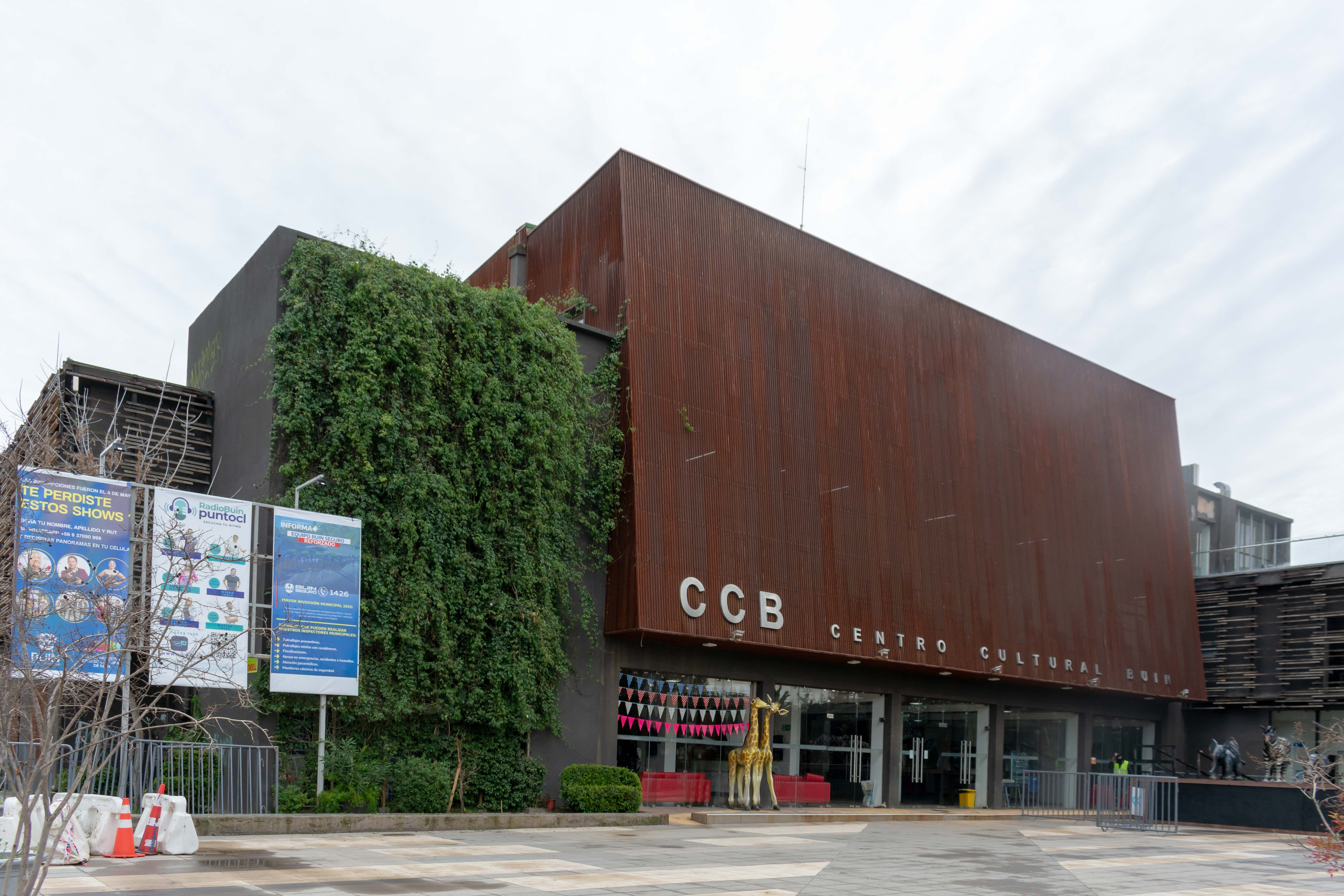
Cultural center

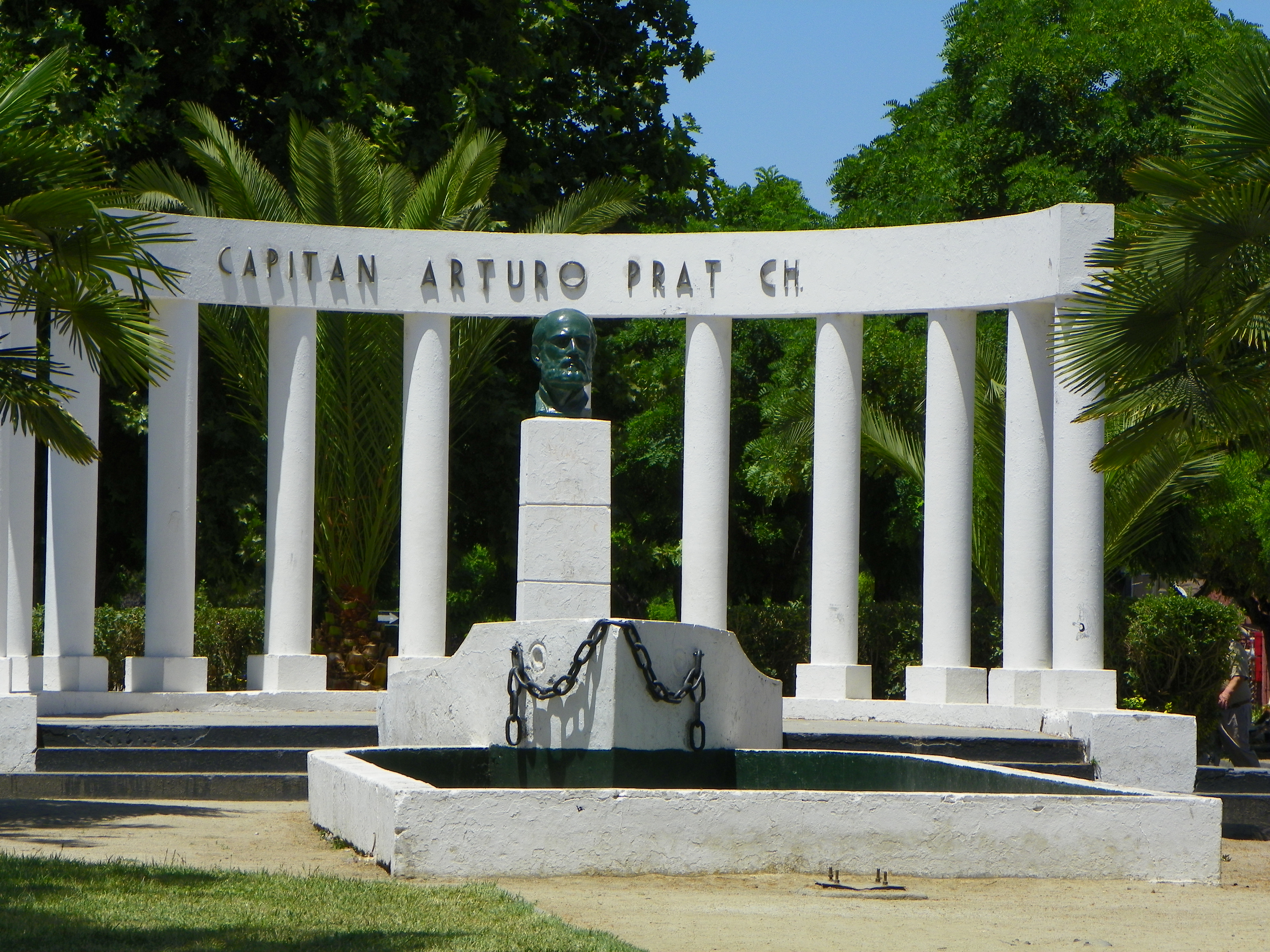
Arturo Prat monument

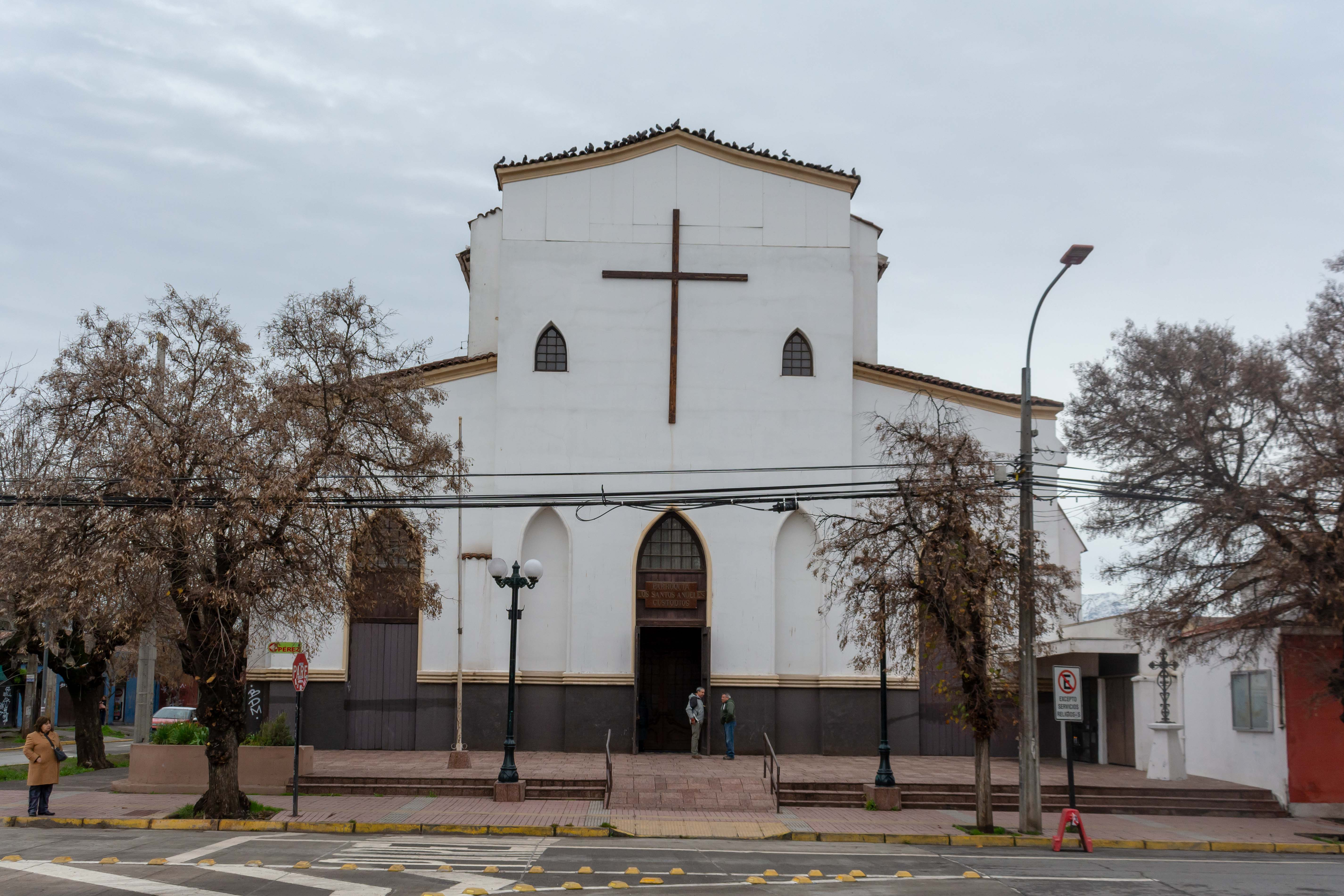
Iglesia de los Santos Ángeles Custodios

== Demographics ==
According to the 2002 census of the National Statistics Institute, Buin spans an area of 214.1 km^{2} (83 sq mi) and has 63,419 inhabitants (31,440 men and 31,979 women). Of these, 53,506 (84.4%) lived in urban areas and 9,913 (15.6%) in rural areas. The population grew by 20.1% (10,627 persons) between the 1992 and 2002 censuses. In the 2017 census, Buin's population had increased to 96,614, with 47,575 men and 49,039 women.

== Administration ==
As a commune, Buin is a third-level administrative division of Chile administered by a municipal council, headed by an alcalde who is directly elected every four years. The 2012-2016 alcalde is Ángel Bozán Ramos (IND). The communal council has the following members:

- Patricio Silva Gonzalez (PPD)
- Hernán Henriquez Parrao (PRSD)
- Miguel Araya Lobos (UDI)
- Ramon Calderón Hormazábal (PDC)
- Sandra Meneses Tapia (PPD)
- Nicolás Romo Contreras (UDI)

Within the electoral divisions of Chile, Buin is represented in the Chamber of Deputies by Ramón Farías (PPD) and José Antonio Kast (UDI) as part of the 30th electoral district, (together with San Bernardo, Paine and Calera de Tango). The commune is represented in the Senate by Guido Girardi Lavín (PPD) and Jovino Novoa Vásquez (UDI) as part of the 7th senatorial constituency (Santiago-West).

== Notable people ==
=== Sports ===
- Claudio Bravo (born 1983), Former footballer
