= Maipo Province =

Maipo Province Provincia de Maipo
- Province
- Seal

- Location in the Santiago Metropolitan Region

- Location in Chile
- Coordinates: 33°45′S 70°46′W
- Country: Chile
- Region: Santiago Metropolitan
- Capital: San Bernardo
- Communes: List of 4: Buin; Paine; San Bernardo; Calera de Tango

Government
  - Type: Provincial
  - Presidential Provincial Delegate: Miguel Ángel Rojas Alarcón (Socialist Party)

Area
  - Total: 1,120.5 km^{2} (432.6 sq mi)
  - Rank: 5

Population (2012 Census)
  - Total: 440,591
  - Rank: 3
  - Density: 393.21/km^{2} (1,018.4/sq mi)
  - Urban: 336,198
  - Rural: 42,246

Sex
  - Men: 187,789.
  - Women: 190,655
- Time zone: UTC-4 (CLT)
  - Summer (DST): UTC-3 (CLST)
- Area code: 56 + 2
- Website: Delegation of Maipo

Maipo Province (Spanish: Provincia de Maipo) is one of six provinces in the Santiago Metropolitan Region of central Chile. Its capital is San Bernardo.

== Administration ==
As a province, Maipo is a second-level administrative division of Chile, governed by a provincial delegate who is appointed by the president.

=== Communes ===
The province is composed of four communes (Spanish: comunas), each governed by a municipality consisting of an alcalde and municipal council:

- Buin
- Paine
- San Bernardo, capital
- Calera de Tango

== Geography and demography ==
The province spans an area of 1,120.5 km^{2} (1,120 km^{2}), making it the second smallest province in the Santiago Metropolitan Region. According to the 2002 census, Maipo was the third most populous province in the region with a total population of 378,444. At that time, there were 336,198 people living in urban areas, 42,246 living in rural areas, 187,789 men, and 190,655 women.

== Maipo Valley wine region ==
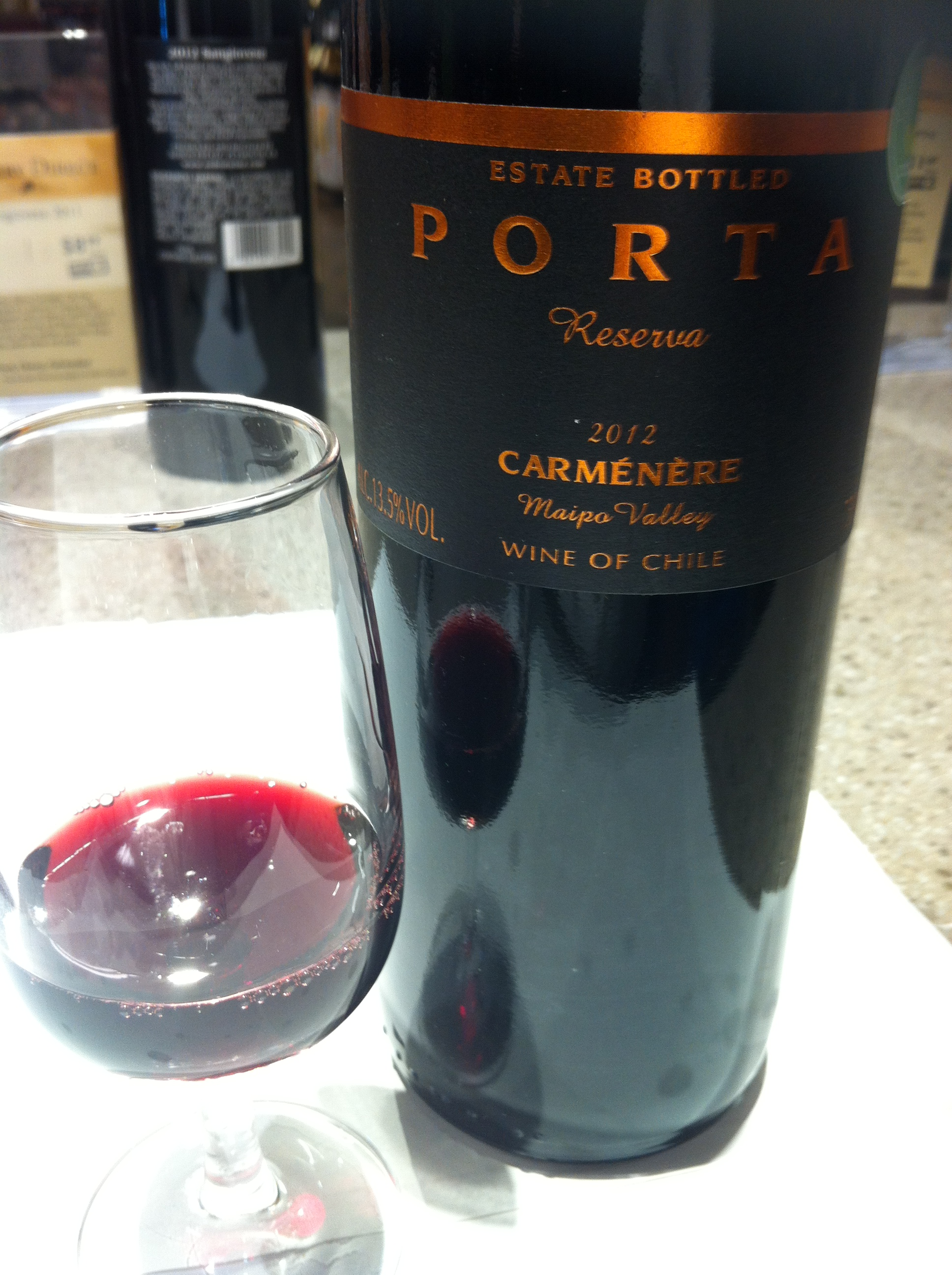
A Carmenere from the Maipo Valley.

Maipo Valley is the closest Chilean wine region to Santiago, the capital city of Chile. It extends eastwards from the city to the Andes and westward to the coast, stretching south toward the towns and subzones of Padre Hurtado, Peñaflor, Talagante, Isla de Maipo and Melipilla.

The valley includes over 7,302 acres (2,955 ha) of vineyards, more than half of which are dedicated to producing Cabernet Sauvignon or Cabernet blends. It is a historic wine-producing region and the birthplace of the Chilean wine industry, with vines growing there for the past 150 years.

The Maipo Valley can be divided in three sub-regions: Alto Maipo, Central Maipo, and Pacific Maipo.

Alto Maipo

The Alto Maipo sub-region is located in the foothills of the Andes, rising from 400 m.a.s.l. to 800 m.a.s.l. (1,300 to 2,600 feet), and is strongly influenced by the mountainous climate. The mountains make the zone particularly good for viticulture because they produce a great variation in temperature between day and night. This is because the sun must first rise above the Argentinean side of the Andes before reaching the western Chilean slopes, creating cold mornings, and then sets on the western side, leading to hot, sunny afternoons. The climate, combined with the poor, porous and rocky soil, puts the vines under stress which in turn produces a characteristically bold, elegant Cabernet Sauvignon.

Central Maipo

The area surrounding the Maipo River is one of the oldest winemaking areas in Chile and was the first part of the Maipo Valley to be settled. Cabernet Sauvignon dominates production, but the region has also started producing Carmenere wines. Central Maipo is the warmest and driest of the three Maipo Valley sub-regions, with rocky alluvial soils and less rainfall than the Alto Maipo and Pacific Maipo, requiring drip irrigation. Vineyards are often planted along the Maipo River, an area known for its alluvial soils.

Pacific Maipo

Pacific Maipo is the youngest wine-producing area in the Maipo Valley and there are relatively few vineyards found in the vicinity of the Maipo River. Grapes grown in this region benefit from the coastal influence of the Pacific Ocean as well as the alluvial soils also found in the area. Red wines from Pacific Maipo have a refreshing, natural acidity from the influence of the ocean. The vineyards in this area tend to be tucked up against some of the smaller, low-lying hills that rise between the Andes and the Coastal Range so that they are protected from the harsh winds coming off the coast. Because of the region’s coastal influence, Pacific Maipo is also a popular place for experimentation with the country’s white varieties, most notably Sauvignon Blanc.

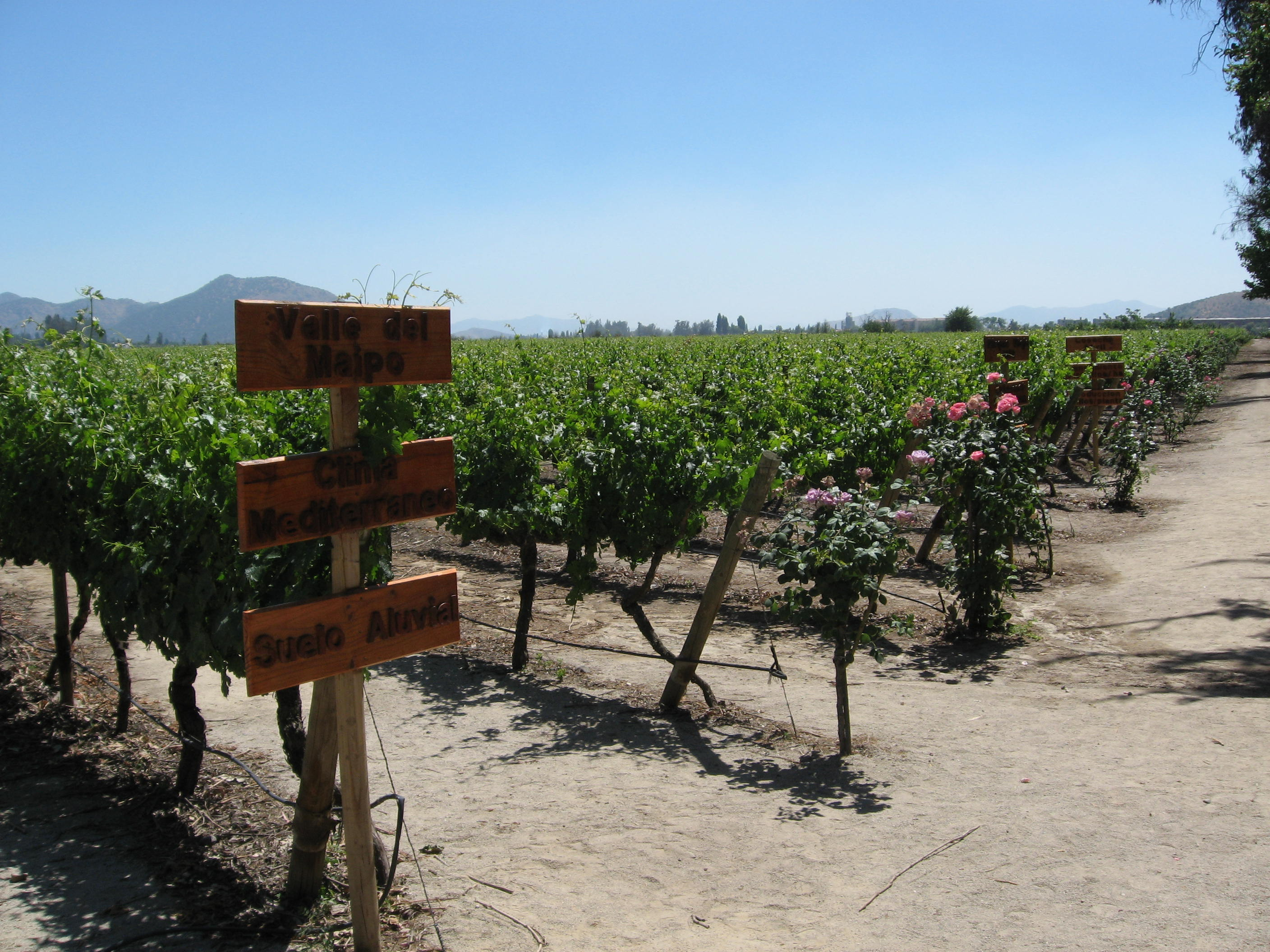
Concha Y Toro in Maipo Valley

=== Grape distribution by varietal ===
- Climate: Mediterranean, 315 mm (12.4 in) annual rainfall.
- Soils: Sandy and gravel to the east, more clay to the west.
- Primary grape varietals: Cabernet Sauvignon, Carmenere, and Syrah.

Cabernet Sauvignon: 6,433 ha (15897 acres)	Merlot: 1,103 ha (2726 acres)	Carménère: 810 ha (2002 acres)
Syrah: 975 ha (2409 acres)	Sauvignon Blanc: 694 ha (1715 acres)	Chardonnay: 1,056 ha (2609 acres)
Pinot Noir: 129 ha (319 acres)	Malbec / Cot: 80 ha (198 acres)	Cabernet Franc: 259 ha (640 acres)

- Total Hectares planted: 12,955 ha (7,302 acres)
