= Socialist Youth (Chile) =

Political party in Chile

Socialist Youth of Chile Juventud Socialista de Chile
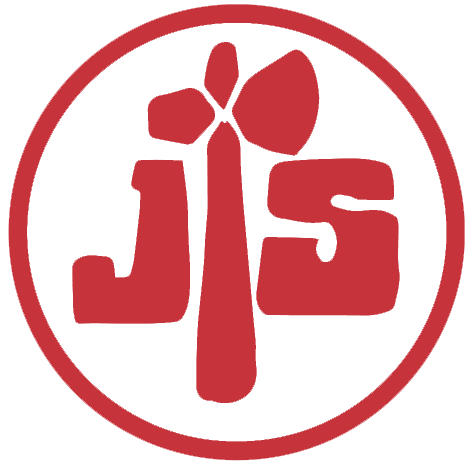
- President: Tomás Volenski
- Founded: November 4, 1935
- Headquarters: París 873, Barrio París-Londres, Santiago, Chile
- Membership: 8,500
- Ideology: Democratic socialism Progressivism; Social democracy Feminism; Factions: Socialism (multi-tendency)
- Mother party: Socialist Party of Chile
- International affiliation: International Union of Socialist Youth (IUSY)
- Website: pschile.cl/jschile/

The Socialist Youth of Chile (Spanish: Juventud Socialista de Chile, JS / La Jota Ese) is the youth wing of the Socialist Party of Chile. It was founded on November 4, 1935, and it incorporates young socialism activists between the ages of 14 and 30. The JS has political representation at the local and national level and its members have played a prominent role in the student organizations in Chile. According to the last internal elections, the youth wing of the socialist party currently has 8500 members.

== Historical review ==
=== Foundation of the Socialist Youth Federation ===
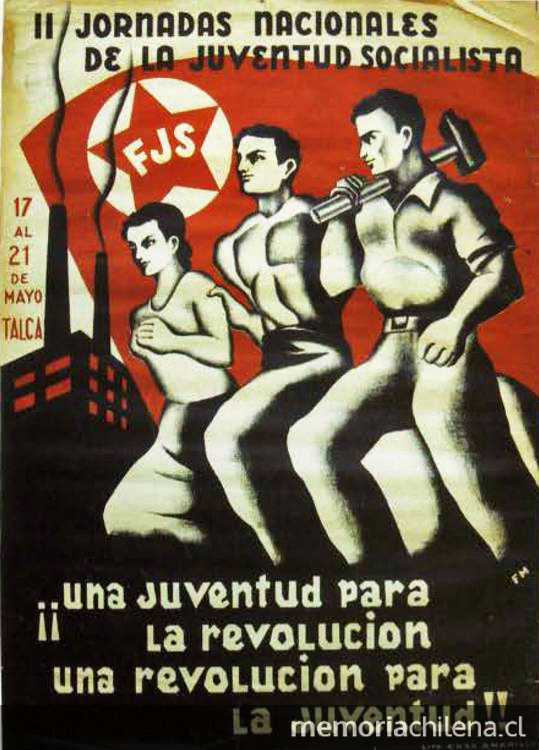
II National Conference of the Socialist Youth Federation (FJS), 1936 (Source: Memoria Chilena).

On November 4, 1935, two years after the founding of the Socialist Party of Chile, what would become the Socialist Youth of Chile, better known as JS, was born. In those days, the PS maintained support groups organized as a party brigade, whose mission was to strengthen mass work on the different fronts. The Socialist Women's Group, AMS, revolutionaries for women's liberation, the University Brigades and the Socialist Militias stood out especially, for their relentless work in the fight against Chilean fascism. In those years, the PS managed to structure the Socialist Youth Federation, FJS, whose symbol (a closed fist in the heart of a red star) reflected the revolutionary spirit of a youth that would confront the enemies of the people without hesitation. The young socialists distinguished themselves by their combativeness and were the first to confront the troops of national Nazism in the street, managing to stop their advance. In this struggle he left his life Manuel Bastias in Concepción and the young writer Héctor Barreto, first martyrs of Chilean socialism.

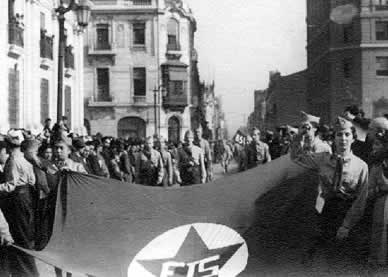
March of the Socialist Youth Federation (FJS) during the 1930s.

Shortly thereafter, young socialists stand out for their political capacity and their contributions to the development of the PS. It is the young socialists who raise the revolutionary profile of the popular movement during the multi-class government of Pedro Aguirre Cerda (Frente Popular, 1938).

Subsequently, it will be one of its leaders, the young Raúl Ampuero, who will take charge of the General Secretary of the PS, standing out for his classist and revolutionary leadership. Also at that time, the former socialist militiaman, member of the youth Salvador Allende Gossens, had already begun to assume responsibilities of national relevance.

For this period, the JS has already consolidated its insertion in universities, towns and unions, fighting for demands that integrate youth; The right to education for all, school fees, student immunity, labor improvements, all become slogans.

At the beginning of the 1960s, young socialists were the first to rescue for Chile the lessons of the recent Cuban Revolution, the first in Latin America. The Young Socialists, motivated by their anti-imperialist rebellion, highlight the need for an insurrectional uprising against the fundamental enemies: Imperialism and the national bourgeoisie. They are the first to rise up and take to the streets to demonstrate that the Cuban path should serve as a guide for us. The JS, of course, was articulated for the formation of the Popular Unity, which would lead the socialist Salvador Allende to the presidency of Chile in 1970.

=== Unidad Popular ===
In the 70s, after a turbulent period of class struggle in the last decade, the popular vanguard already had a solid Youth Movement, which gave it its greatest combative character and where the JS played an important leading role. Furthermore, the JS manages to form brigades in several universities, where at that time a young woman Michelle Bachelet is remembered who approached the Socialist Youth influenced by the university leader Ennio Vivaldi, and by a young deputy and general secretary of the JS Carlos Lorca, both of whom were leaders of the University of Chile.

In 1971, the XX National Conference of the JS approved a program and an organic structure that would consolidate its unquestionable revolutionary, Marxist and Leninist profile. Under his direction, the JS presides over the Youth Popular Unity and maintains the unity of the Popular Movement from the youth level. This fact distances itself from what was promoted in the structure of the "Adult PS", which moved away from Marxism-Leninism represented by leaders such as Carlos Altamirano, and approached humanist Marxism promoted by leaders such as the former senator, academic and rector of the University of Chile Eugenio González Rojas, or by President Allende in the remembered speech "The Chilean road to socialism" from 1971.

=== Dictatorship and clandestinity ===
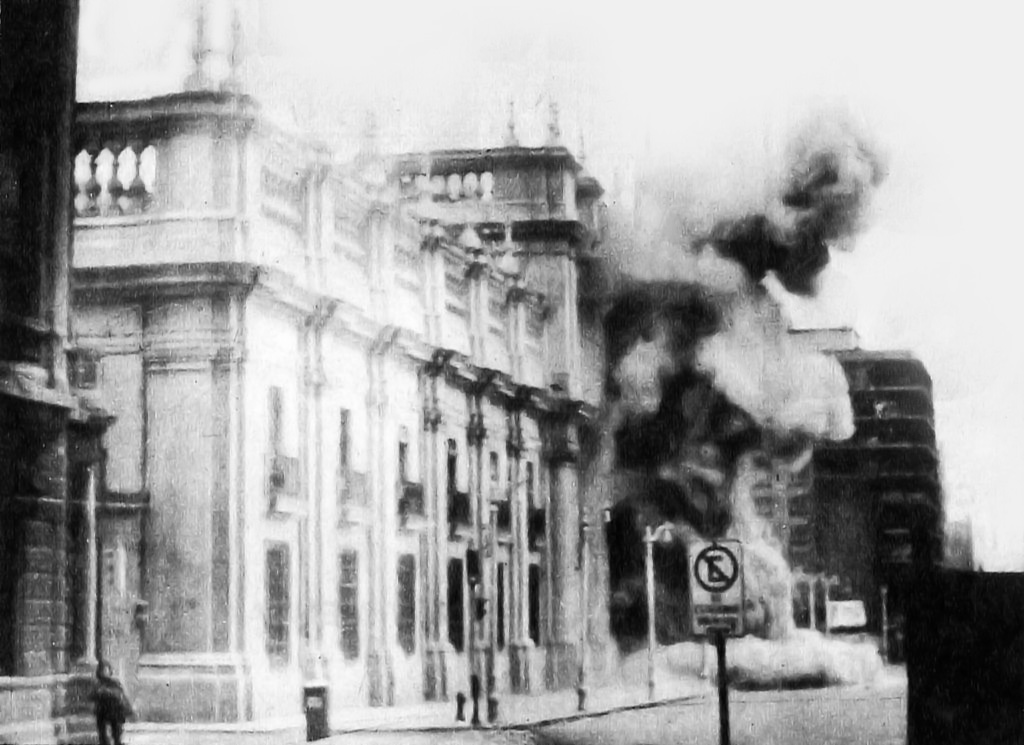
Coup d'état of September 11, 1973, in Chile. Bombing of the La Moneda Palace.

After the Coup d'état in Chile of 1973, numerous young socialists came out to resist and heroically confronted the coup forces. Subsequently, the JS offered its best cadres for the reconstruction of the PS, becoming part of the leadership of the PS after the murder, exile, detention or disappearance of many of its members, such as Ricardo Lagos Salinas, Exequiel Ponce, Carolina Wiff, Michelle Peña and Carlos Lorca. In 1975 the names of those companions will be added to the list of those detained and disappeared by the dictatorship.

The Socialist Youth sacrificed its organic structure in the face of the need to recompose the historic Socialist Party, however, already in 1978 a leadership of the JS was articulated whose mission would be to recover its dimension organic. At this stage, the attacks of the dictatorship continually occur to prevent the reorganization of the young socialists. In this struggle, among others, Daniel Medel, Flavio in Nicaragua fall; However, after an arduous, historic effort, the JS inaugurated at the end of 1984 a new stage of its development: The XXI National Conference that concluded with the definition of its own organization, electing a Central Committee, a Political Commission and re-electing Carlos Lorca as Secretary General, but symbolically, since as long as his whereabouts were not known, a Subrogating Secretary General was empowered to replace him. At this crossroads appears a young socialist Bernardo Echeverría Vial (brother of the former right-wing Minister Fernando Echeverría), who was the head of the National Youth Commission of the PS and who after the coup d'état remained in the secrecy. After the disappearance of Carlos Lorca in 1975, Bernardo inherited the interim General Secretariat and was the one who reinstated it.

=== End of the dictatorship and transition to democracy ===
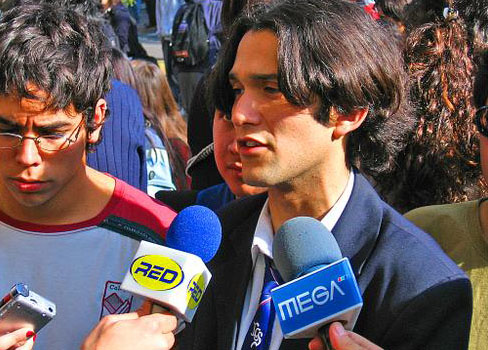
César Valenzuela, one of the main spokespersons of the Coordinating Assembly of Secondary Students during the 2006 student protests in Chile.

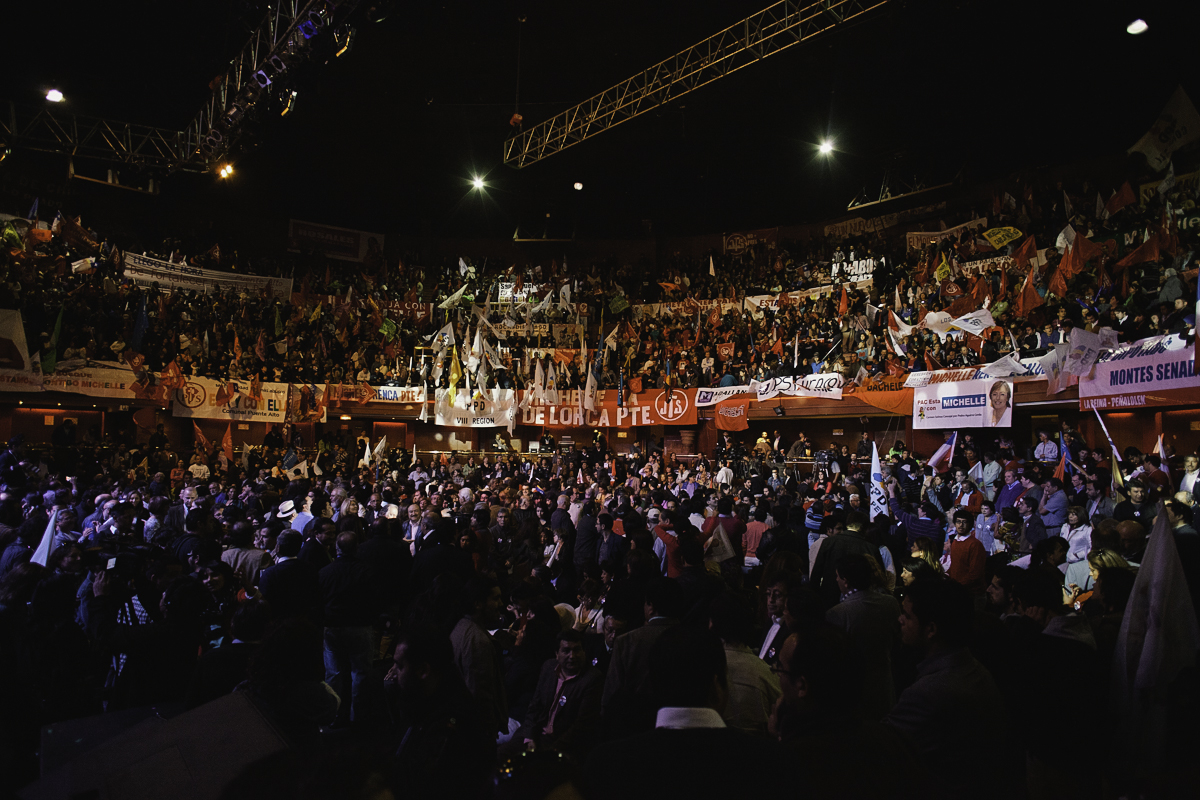
Proclamation of Michelle Bachelet as presidential candidate at the Teatro Caupolicán in 2013.

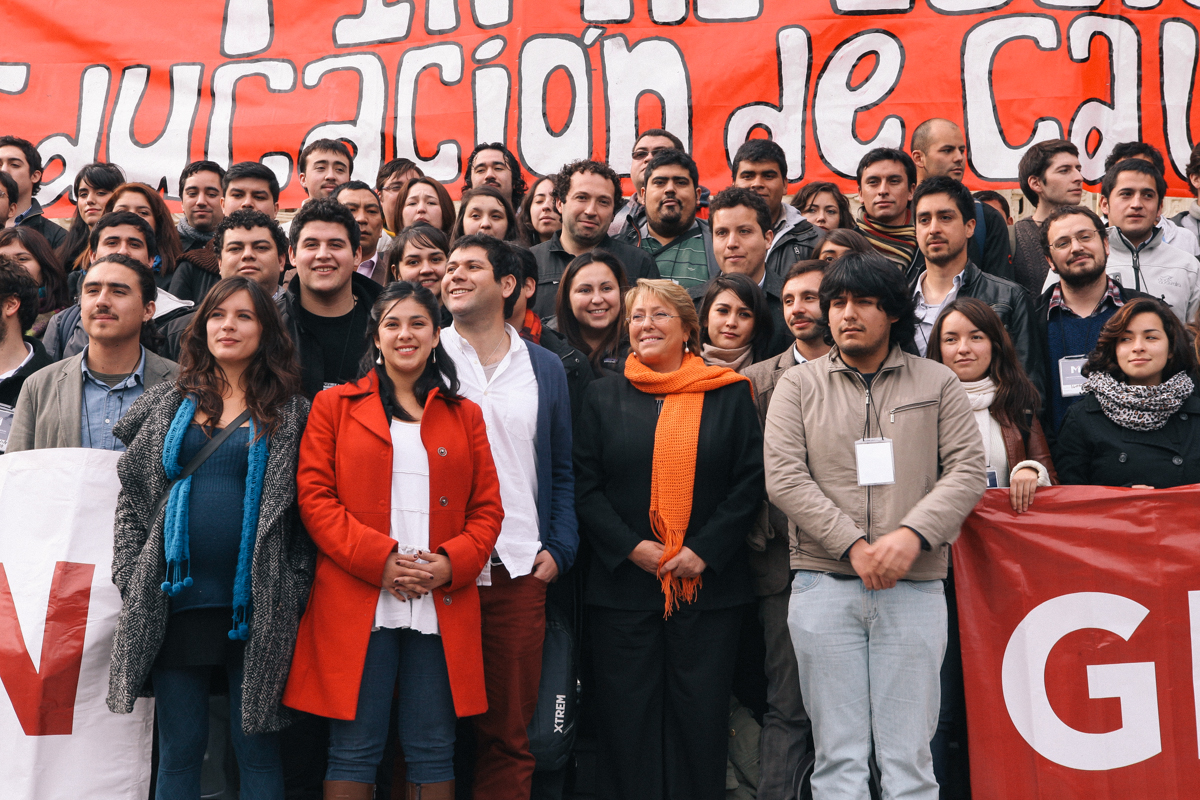
Bachelet the same year together with the JS and former student leaders at the Santiago Museum of Contemporary Art.

Once the dictatorship ended through the 1988 Chilean presidential referendum, the JS became an autonomous body of the Socialist Party of Chile, in a new political scenario diametrically different from the revolutionary past of the years when the Popular Unity was in government. In this context, participation in democracy in the different social movements that have been developing has been fundamental to advance profound changes to the Pinochet legacy, being behind demands in areas such as education, unions, sexual diversity, the environment, gender, regionalism, indigenous, constitutional, among others. It had a leading role during the 90's, such as the rearticulation at the national level of communal groups, student brigades, as well as commands for the campaigns of the Transition governments. Some well-known militants of the time were Álvaro Elizalde, president of the FECH in 1993 and president of the JS in the year 1996, and Freddy Ponce interim president of the FECH in 1994 who despite not achieving the minimum quorum, won the election against the then socialist Marco Enríquez-Ominami.

It is worth highlighting the importance of the JS during the presidential campaigns of Michelle Bachelet for the first term and second government, who have always characterized by being on the ground. Additionally, Chile had the well-known 2006 student protests in Chile, which were demonstrations led by Chilean secondary students in favor of the right to education, in response to the privatization of the Chilean education system imposed by the dictatorship. The main JS leaders of these mobilizations were the spokespersons César Valenzuela and Karina Delfino, who subsequently presided over the Socialist Youth in 2010 and 2013 respectively.

== Notable people ==
- Michelle Bachelet, Chile's former president.
- Carlos Lorca, Chilean physician, deputy for Valdivia province, and General Secretary of the Socialist Youth.
- Ennio Vivaldi, Former rector of the University of Chile between 2014 and 2022.

== See also ==
- International Union of Socialist Youth (IUSY)
