= Camila Musante =

Chilean politician (born 1990)

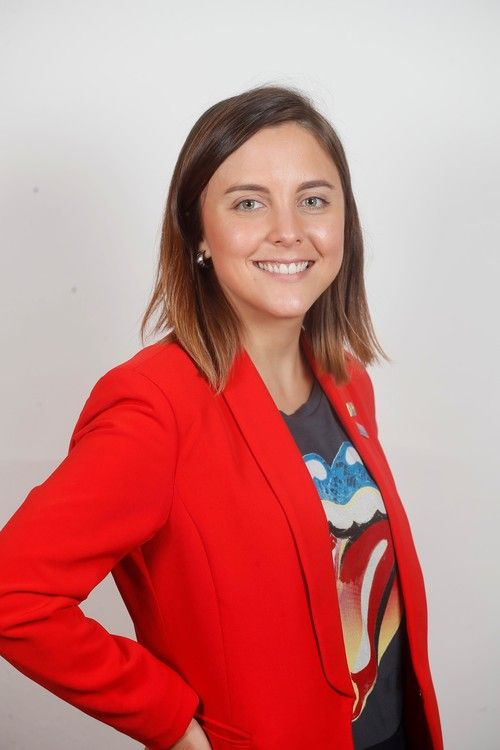
- Camila Musante as deputy in 2022.

Member of the Chamber of Deputies
- In office 11 March 2022 – 11 March 2026
- Constituency: District 14

Personal details
- Born: 6 February 1990 (age 36) Valdivia, Chile
- Party: Independent
- Parent(s): Hugo Musante Hein; Marianella Müller
- Education: Universidad Mayor (LL.B)
- Profession: Lawyer

Camila Fernanda Musante Müller (born 6 February 1990) is a Chilean lawyer, feminist activist and politician. Elected to the Chamber of Deputies for district 14 in 2021, she is one of the first openly bisexual Chilean congresswomen along with Francisca Bello.

From 2020 to 2021, Musante was a member of the Common Force, a political movement headed by Fernando Atria and part of the Broad Front. In the conventional constituent elections, she applied as an independent candidate in a Democratic Revolution quota in the Apruebo Dignidad pact for district No. 14, but was not elected.

Later, in the parliamentary elections held in November of the same year, she was elected as deputy for the 14th district for AD as an independent in a Commons quota; she became one of the congresswomen representing sexual diversity along with Francisca Bello, Marcela Riquelme and Emilia Schneider.

== Early life and education ==
Musante studied law at the Universidad Mayor, graduating as a lawyer in 2015, and has a master's degree in environmental law. She is a member of the Association of Feminist Lawyers (Abofem) where she served as deputy director of Public Law and director of the Agua para el Pueblo Foundation.

In 2018, Musante was a member of the Chile Environmental Law Observatory, belonging to the Autonomous University of Chile, and in 2019 she was part of the Chilean Human Rights Commission. She has also served as a member of the Center for Constitutional and Administrative Studies of the Major University, of which she was its founder, and as a columnist in the digital medium El Desconcierto.

== Political career ==
She began her political trajectory by joining assemblies and movements that emerged in the context of the 2019–2020 Chilean protests.

She was a candidate in the Constitutional Convention elections held in May 2021 for 14th District, running as an independent within the Apruebo Dignidad coalition, but she was not elected. She obtained 16,211 votes, corresponding to 5.34% of the total valid votes cast.

In November 2021 she was elected as a deputy again for 14th District, corresponding to the communes of Alhué, Buin, Calera de Tango, Curacaví, El Monte, Isla de Maipo, María Pinto, Melipilla, Padre Hurtado, Paine, Peñaflor, San Bernardo, San Pedro, and Talagante, in the Santiago Metropolitan Region, running as an independent within the Apruebo Dignidad coalition. She obtained 12,387 votes, equivalent to 3.80% of the total valid votes cast.

She ran for re-election in the same district in the parliamentary elections of 16 November 2025 as an independent on the ticket of the Party for Democracy (PPD), within the Unity for Chile coalition. She was not re-elected, obtaining 28,292 votes, corresponding to 4.91% of the total valid votes cast.
