= Mochilazo =

The student mobilisation of 2001 (self-styled "Mochilazo") corresponds to the first phenomenon of notorious participation and demonstrations led by high school students in Chile after the transition to democracy. These brief and limited demonstrations protested against the decline in benefits to school education, such as subsidised transportation fees.

The year 2001 marks a milestone in the history of student movements, as a strike of high school students was called and adhered to on April 9, which achieved 80% adherence in the schools of the Santiago commune. The strike was summoned in disagreement with the agreement reached regarding the school pass, demanding that the school pass issued in 2000 could be used during 2001, without having to pay its cost again, of 2,500 Chilean pesos. During the day, marches were recorded in Santiago and clashes with Carabineros de Chile.

The influence and leadership of the recently founded Secondary Students Coordinating Assembly (ACES), formed the previous year after a division of the Federation of Secondary Students of Santiago (FESES), under the control of the Communist Youth of Chile, was visible. In addition, it was considered as a support to the claims of the College of Teachers of Chile, which days before had made teacher stoppages for their respective union claims.

These last facts allow us to recognize the appearance of the influences of political cadres in schools, and also to foresee differences between social causes and those of political purposes, during the government of Ricardo Lagos Escobar and the Concertación political coalition, which led him to be president with the support of the Communist Party of Chile. According to the sociologist Juan Ignacio Venegas, these mobilisations should be considered a milestone in the way of conceiving student organization and the approach to political participation of young Chileans.

== See also ==
- 2006 student protests in Chile
- 2008 student protests in Chile
- 2011-2013 Chilean student protests
