= Juan Antonio Coloma Álamos =

Chilean politician (born 1980)

Juan Antonio Coloma
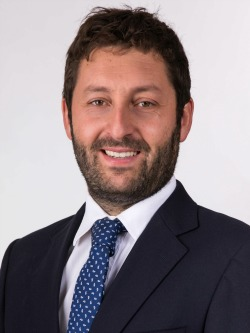

Member of the Chamber of Deputies
- In office 11 March 2018 – 11 March 2026
- Preceded by: District created
- Constituency: District 14
- In office 11 March 2010 – 11 March 2018
- Preceded by: Cristian Letelier
- Succeeded by: District abolished
- Constituency: 31st District (Alhué, Curacaví, El Monte, Isla de Maipo, María Pinto, Melipilla, Padre Hurtado, Peñaflor, San Pedro and Talagante)

Personal details
- Born: 14 March 1980 (age 46) Santiago, Chile
- Party: Independent Democratic Union
- Spouse: María Francisca Hoffmann
- Children: Two
- Parent(s): Juan Antonio Coloma Correa; María Cecilia Álamos
- Relatives: Juan Antonio Coloma Mellado (great-grandfather); María José Hoffmann (sister-in-law)
- Education: Pontifical Catholic University of Chile (LL.B); Francisco de Vitoria University (LL.M)
- Occupation: Politician
- Profession: Lawyer
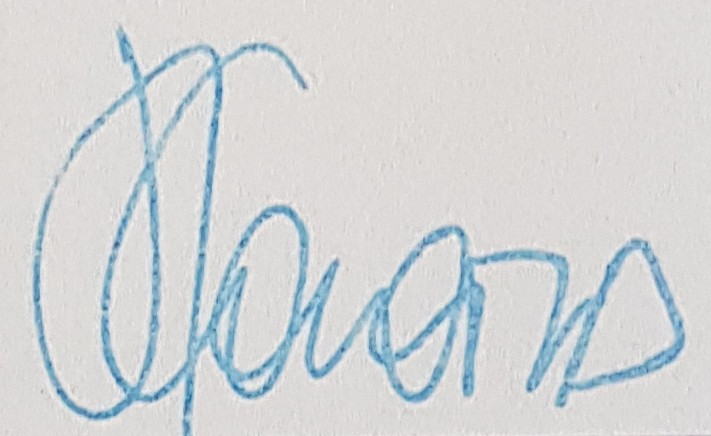
- Signature

Juan Antonio Coloma Álamos (born 14 March 1980) is a Chilean politician who currently serves as a member of the Chamber of Deputies of Chile. Similarly, he is son of the senator Juan Antonio Coloma Correa.

== Biography ==
He was born in Santiago, on 14 March 1980. He is the son of Senator Juan Antonio Coloma Correa and María Cecilia Álamos Jordán.

He is married to María Francisca Hoffmann Opazo and is the father of two daughters.

He completed his primary and secondary education at Colegio del Verbo Divino, graduating in 1997. He later studied Law at the Pontifical Catholic University of Chile, qualifying as a lawyer in January 2005. He also holds a Master’s degree in Citizen Participation, completed in Spain.

In 2009, he worked as a researcher at the Jaime Guzmán Foundation.

== Political career ==
In the 2009 parliamentary elections, he ran as a candidate for the Chamber of Deputies of Chile representing the 11th District of the Valparaíso Region, on behalf of the Independent Democratic Union (UDI) within the Coalición por el Cambio coalition, but was not elected.

Within party activities, he was a member of the UDI Political Commission for the 2012–2014 period, obtaining the highest number of votes within that body in 2012. He also served for three years as vice-president of the Youth Wing of the Independent Democratic Union.

In the public sector, he worked for three years as legal director of the Municipality of Renca. From May 2010 to July 2011, he served as Executive Secretary of the Undersecretariat of Mining, and subsequently, between August 2011 and December 2012, as Head of the Advisory Coordination Unit of the Ministry of Public Works (Chile).

In 2013, he served as territorial campaign manager for presidential candidate Laurence Golborne.

In the 2017 parliamentary elections, he was elected Deputy of the Republic representing the Independent Democratic Union for the 14th District of the Metropolitan Region of Santiago, within the Chile Vamos coalition, for the 2018–2022 legislative period. He obtained 35,779 votes, corresponding to 11.79% of the valid votes cast.

In August 2021, he ran for re-election in the 14th District. In November, he was elected representing the Independent Democratic Union within the Chile Podemos Más coalition, obtaining 34,868 votes, corresponding to 10.70% of the valid votes cast.

Since July 2024, he has served as Secretary General of the Independent Democratic Union.

He was a candidate for the Senate representing the 9th Circumscription of the Maule Region, on behalf of the Independent Democratic Union within the Chile Grande y Unido coalition, in the parliamentary elections held on 16 November 2025. He was not elected, obtaining 47,314 votes, equivalent to 6.78% of the total votes cast.
