= List of international trips made by Fidel Castro =

This is a list of international trips made by Fidel Castro, who served as the leader of Cuba from 1959 to 2011.

This annex lists exclusively those foreign trips made during his period as head of government, regardless of office, excluding technical stopovers without official activity, personal trips, or travel of any other non-official kind.

== List ==
=== As prime minister ===
Date	Destination	Main purpose
1959 (Note: He made a technical stopover to spend the night in Port of Spain, Trinidad and Tobago, between 7 and 8 May.)
23–27 January	Caracas (Venezuela)	Working visit.
15–29 April	Washington, D.C., Princeton, Lawrenceville, New York, and Boston (United States)	Working visit.
26 April	Montreal (Canada)	Working visit.
27–29 April	Houston (United States)	Working visit.
29 April	Port of Spain (Trinidad and Tobago)	Courtesy visit with official reception by the Trinidadian prime minister.
30 April – 1 May	São Paulo and Brasília (Brazil)	Working visit.
1–3 May	Buenos Aires (Argentina)	Working visit.
3–5 May	Montevideo (Uruguay)	Working visit.
5–7 May	Rio de Janeiro (Brazil)	Working visit.
1960
18–26 September	New York (United States)	Participation in the annual session of the United Nations.
1961—1962
No official foreign visits
1963
27 April – 3 June	Murmansk, Moscow, Volgograd, Tashkent, Samarkand, Irkutsk, Bratsk, Sverdlovsk, Leningrad, Moscow, Kyiv, Moscow and Tbilisi (Soviet Union)	State visit and tour of the Russian SFSR, Uzbek SSR, Ukrainian SSR and Georgian SSR.
1964
13–22 January	Moscow and Kyiv (Soviet Union)	State visit.
1965–1970
No official foreign visits
1971
10 November – 4 December	Santiago, Antofagasta, Chuquicamata, Iquique, Concepción, Puerto Montt, Punta Arenas and Colchagua (Chile)	State visit and tour of various provinces.
4 December	Lima (Peru)	Working visit.
4 December	Guayaquil (Ecuador)	Working visit.
1972
3–7 May	Conakry, Kankan, Kissidougou, Faranah, Labé, Sanoyah and Kindia (Guinea)	State visit and tour of various provinces.
7–8 May	Lungi and Freetown (Sierra Leone)	State visit.
8–17 May	Algiers, Ouargla, Oran, Constantine, Mostaganem and Annaba (Algeria)	State visit and tour of various provinces.
17–26 May	Sofia, Yambol, Plovdiv, Varna, Ruse and Pleven (Bulgaria)	State visit and tour of various provinces.
26–30 May	Bucharest, Ploiești and Călărași (Romania)	State visit and tour of various provinces.
30 May – 6 June	Budapest, Veszprém, Győr and Fejér (Hungary)	State visit and tour of various provinces.
6–13 June	Warsaw, Silesia, Kraków, Western Pomerania and Masuria (Poland)	State visit and tour of various provinces.
13–21 June	Berlin, Saxony-Anhalt, Saxony and Mecklenburg-Vorpommern (East Germany)	State visit and tour of various provinces.
21–26 June	Prague, Bratislava, Nitra and Prešov (Czechoslovakia)	State visit and tour of various provinces.
26 June – 5 July	Moscow, Voronezh and Minsk (Soviet Union)	State visit and tour of the Russian SFSR and the Byelorussian SSR.
19 December	Rabat (Morocco)	Working visit.
19–22 December	Moscow (Soviet Union)	Working visit.
24 December	Gander (Canada)	Stopover for an interview with a local newspaper.
1973
2–3 September	Georgetown (Guyana)	State visit.
3–4 September	Port of Spain (Trinidad and Tobago)	Working visit and meeting with heads of government from the Caribbean region.
4 September	Conakry (Guinea)	Working visit.
5–9 September	Algiers (Algeria)	State visit and participation in the summit of the Non-Aligned Movement.
9–11 September	Baghdad (Iraq)	State visit.
11–12 September	New Delhi (India)	State visit.
12–13 September	Hanoi (Vietnam)	State visit.
13–14 September	Đồng Hới, Vinh Linh, Saigon (South Vietnam)	State visit.
14–16 September	Hanoi (Vietnam)	State visit.
16–17 September	Calcutta and New Delhi (India)	Working visit.
17 September	Prague (Czechoslovakia)	Working visit.
18 September	Toronto (Canada)	Working visit.
1974–1975
No official foreign visits
1976 (Note: He made a technical stopover in Canada on 21 February.)
22 February – 5 March	Moscow (Soviet Union)	Special guest at the 25th Congress of the Communist Party of the Soviet Union.
6–8 March	Pula, Brijuni and Koper (Yugoslavia)	Working visit.
8–12 March	Sofia (Bulgaria)	State visit.
12–14 March	Algiers and Ben Aknoun (Algeria)	State visit.
14–15 March	Conakry (Guinea)	State visit.

=== As president ===
==== 1977–1981 ====
Date	Destination	Main purpose
1977
1 March	Algiers (Algeria)	Working visit.
1–10 March	Tripoli, Sabha, Benghazi and Sirte (Libya)	State visit and tour of various cities.
10–12 March	Aden (0 days)	State visit.
12–14 March	Mogadishu (Somalia)	State visit.
14–15 March	Addis Ababa (Ethiopia)	State visit.
17–21 March	Dar es Salaam, Zanzibar, Moshi, Sirte and Loliondo (Tanzania)	State visit and tour of various cities.
21–22 March	Beira and Mafambisse (Mozambique)	State visit.
23–31 March	Luanda, Quifangondo, Moçâmedes, Lubango and Benguela (Angola)	State visit and tour of various cities.
31 March – 1 April	Algiers (Algeria)	State visit.
1–4 April	Berlin (East Germany)	State visit.
4–7 April	Moscow (Soviet Union)	State visit.
16–21 October	Kingston, Montego Bay, Falmouth and Savanna-la-Mar (Jamaica)	State visit.
1978
12–18 September	Addis Ababa, Ogaden and Dire Dawa (Ethiopia)	State visit.
19 September	Tripoli (Libya)	Working visit.
19–20 September	Algiers (Algeria)	Working visit.
1979
17–18 May	Cozumel, Cancún and Chetumal (Mexico)	Working visit.
11–13 October	New York (United States)	Participation in the regular session of the United Nations General Assembly.
1980
18–25 July	Managua, Masaya, León, Estelí, Matagalpa, Bluefields, Peñas Blancas, San Juan del Sur, Rivas, Granada (Nicaragua)	State visit and tour of various cities.
1981
22 February – 3 March	Moscow and Odesa (Soviet Union)	Participation in the 26th Congress of the Communist Party of the Soviet Union.
7–8 August	Cozumel (Mexico)	Working visit.

==== 1982–1986 ====
Date	Destination	Main purpose
1982 (Note: He made two technical stopovers at Shannon Airport, Ireland, on 14 and 17 November; during the first he gave an interview to local media, and during the second he held a brief meeting with the Minister of State.)
14–17 November	Moscow (Soviet Union)	Attended the state funeral of Leonid Brezhnev.
1983
5–6 March	Tashkent (Soviet Union)	Brief visit to the capital of the Uzbek SSR.
6–12 March	New Delhi (India)	Participation in the 7th summit of the Non-Aligned Movement.
12 March	Berlin (East Germany)	Working visit.
1984
13–16 February	Moscow (Soviet Union)	Attended the state funeral of Yuri Andropov.
16 February	Madrid (Spain)	Working visit.
1985
10–11 January	Managua (Nicaragua)	Invited to the inauguration of Daniel Ortega.
1986 (Note: He made a technical stopover in Prague, Czechoslovakia, on 9 and 10 November, without official activities.)
24 February – 7 March	Moscow (Soviet Union)	Participation in the 27th Congress of the Communist Party of the Soviet Union.
8–11 March	Pyongyang (North Korea)	State visit.
12 March	Moscow (Soviet Union)	Working meeting with the Soviet head of state.
31 August – 6 September	Harare (Zimbabwe)	Participation in the 8th summit of the Non-Aligned Movement.
7–9 September	Luanda (Angola)	State visit.
10–11 September	Algiers (Algeria)	State visit.
12–14 September	Belgrade (Yugoslavia)	State visit.
10–12 November	Moscow (Soviet Union)	Participation in the summit of heads of state and government of the Council for Mutual Economic Assistance.

==== 1987–1991 ====
Date	Destination	Main purpose
1987
4–7 November	Moscow (Soviet Union)	Invited to events commemorating the 70th anniversary of the October Revolution.
1988
4–7 November	Quito (Ecuador)	Invited to the inauguration of Rodrigo Borja Cevallos.
30 November – 4 December	Mexico City (Mexico)	Invited to the inauguration of Carlos Salinas de Gortari.
1989
2–4 February	Caracas (Venezuela)	Invited to the inauguration of Carlos Andrés Pérez.
1990
14–19 March	Brasília, São Paulo and Rio de Janeiro (Brazil)	Invited to the inauguration of Fernando Collor de Mello and working visit.
1991
17–20 July	Guadalajara (Mexico)	Participation in the 1st Ibero-American Summit.
22–23 October	Cozumel (Mexico)	Special guest at the summit of heads of state of the Group of Three.

==== 1992–1996 ====
Date	Destination	Main purpose
1992
11–15 June	Rio de Janeiro (Brazil)	Participation in the Earth Summit.
23–28 July	Madrid, Barcelona, Seville, Galicia and Lugo (Spain)	Participation in the 2nd Ibero-American Summit and special guest at the opening of the 1992 Summer Olympics and the Expo '92.
1993
14–19 July	Salvador (Brazil)	Participation in the 3rd Ibero-American Summit.
5–9 August	La Paz and Santa Cruz de la Sierra (Bolivia)	Invited to the inauguration of Gonzalo Sánchez de Lozada.
9–11 August	Cartagena de Indias and Bogotá (Colombia)	Working visit.
1994
4–7 May	Bridgetown (Barbados)	State visit.
7–8 May	Accra (Ghana)	State visit.
8–11 May	Johannesburg and Pretoria (South Africa)	Special guest at the inauguration of Nelson Mandela.
11–12 May	Salvador (Brazil)	Working visit.
13–16 June	Cartagena de Indias (Colombia)	Participation in the 4th Ibero-American Summit.
24–25 July	Cartagena de Indias and Santa Marta (Colombia)	Working visit.
6–8 August	Bogotá (Colombia)	Special guest at the inauguration of Ernesto Samper.
30 November – 2 December	Mexico City (Mexico)	Special guest at the inauguration of Ernesto Zedillo.
1995
10–12 March	Copenhagen (Denmark)	State visit and participation in the World Summit for Social Development.
13–16 March	Paris and Bourgogne-Franche-Comté (France)	State visit.
17–19 August	Port of Spain (Trinidad and Tobago)	State visit and participation in the summit of heads of state and government of the Association of Caribbean States.
13–14 October	Montevideo (Uruguay)	State visit.
15–17 October	San Carlos de Bariloche and Mendoza (Argentina)	Participation in the 5th Ibero-American Summit.
17–18 October	Cartagena de Indias (Colombia)	Participation in the 11th summit of the Non-Aligned Movement.
21–25 October	New York (United States)	Participation in the summit of heads of state and government at the commemorative session marking the 50th anniversary of the United Nations.
29 November – 7 December	Beijing, Xi'an, Shanghai, Shenzhen and Guangdong (China)	State visit and tour of various cities.
8–11 December	Hanoi and Ho Chi Minh City (Vietnam)	State visit.
12 December	Tokyo (Japan)	Working visit.
1996 (Note: He made a technical stopover in Paris on 13 June.)
11–12 January	Paris (France)	Invited to the funeral of François Mitterrand.
14–15 June	Istanbul (Turkey)	State visit.
15–16 June	Tenerife (Spain)	Working visit.
9–11 November	Santiago and Viña del Mar (Chile)	State visit and participation in the 6th Ibero-American Summit.
15–20 November	Rome (Italy)	Participation in the FAO World Food Summit.
19 November	Vatican City (Vatican City)	Meeting with Pope John Paul II.

==== 1997–2001 ====
Date	Destination	Main purpose
1997
16 March	Kingston (Jamaica)	Attendance at the funeral of Michael Manley.
7–9 November	Margarita Island (Venezuela)	Participation in the 7th Ibero-American Summit.
1998
13–21 May	Geneva, Fribourg, Bern and Lausanne (Switzerland)	Participation in the commemorative session marking the fiftieth anniversary of the WHO; visits to various institutions; and meetings with officials of the United Nations, the International Olympic Committee, and the Swiss Confederation.
29–30 July	Kingston (Jamaica)	State visit.
31 July – 2 August	Bridgetown (Barbados)	State visit.
2–3 August	St. George's (Grenada)	State visit.
20–24 August	Santo Domingo and Baní (Dominican Republic)	State visit and participation in the summit of heads of state and government of the Caribbean Forum.
31 August	Salvador (Brazil)	Working visit.
1 September	Windhoek (Namibia)	Working visit.
1–5 September	Durban, Cape Town and Pretoria (South Africa)	State visit and participation in the 12th summit of the Non-Aligned Movement.
5 September	Brasília (Brazil)	Working visit.
16–19 October	Porto (Portugal)	Participation in the 8th Ibero-American Summit.
19–20 October	Extremadura and Madrid (Spain)	Working visit.
1999
1–3 February	Caracas (Venezuela)	Invited to the inauguration of Hugo Chávez.
16–17 April	Santo Domingo (Dominican Republic)	Participation in the summit of heads of state and government of the Association of Caribbean States.
27 June – 1 July	Rio de Janeiro, Niterói and Belo Horizonte (Brazil)	Working visit and participation in the Latin America, the Caribbean and the European Union summit.
2000
5–9 September	New York (United States)	Participation in the Millennium Summit organized by the United Nations.
2–3 October	Montreal (Canada)	Attendance at the funeral of Pierre Trudeau.
26–30 October	La Guaira, Caracas, Barinas, Guanare, Barquisimeto and Valencia (Venezuela)	State visit and tour of various cities.
17–18 November	Panama City (Panama)	Participation in the 10th Ibero-American Summit.
1–3 December	Mexico City (Mexico)	Invited to the inauguration of Vicente Fox.
2001
5–7 May	Algiers (Algeria)	State visit.
7–9 May	Tehran (Iran)	State visit.
9–11 May	Kuala Lumpur (Malaysia)	State visit.
11–14 May	Doha (Qatar)	State visit.
15–16 May	Damascus (Syria)	State visit.
16 May	Tripoli (Libya)	State visit.
17 May	Lisbon (Portugal)	State visit.
11–13 August	Maiquetía, Ciudad Bolívar and Puerto Ordaz (Venezuela)	Working visit.
29 August	Rio de Janeiro (Brazil)	Working visit.
30 August – 2 September	Durban and Johannesburg (South Africa)	Participation in the World Conference against Racism.
3 September	Brasília (Brazil)	Working visit.
10–12 September	Margarita Island (Venezuela)	Participation in the 3rd summit of heads of state and government of the Association of Caribbean States.

==== 2002–2006 ====
Date	Destination	Main purpose
2002
20–21 March	Monterrey (Mexico)	Participation in the International Conference on Financing for Development.
28–30 November	Quito (Ecuador)	State visit.
2003
31 December 2002 – 3 January	Brasília (Brazil)	Invited to the inauguration of Luiz Inácio Lula da Silva.
14–16 January	Quito (Ecuador)	Invited to the inauguration of Lucio Gutiérrez.
21–23 February	Hanoi (Vietnam)	State visit.
23–25 February	Kuala Lumpur (Malaysia)	Participation in the summit of the Non-Aligned Movement.
26 February – 1 March	Beijing, Nanjing and Shanghai (China)	State visit.
1–3 March	Tokyo and Hiroshima (Japan)	State visit.
3 March	Vancouver (Canada)	Working visit.
24–26 May	Buenos Aires (Argentina)	Invited to the inauguration of Néstor Kirchner.
14–16 August	Asunción (Paraguay)	Invited to the inauguration of Nicanor Duarte.
22 December	La Orchila (Venezuela)	Working visit.
2004
No official foreign visits
2005
28–30 June	Anzoátegui (Venezuela)	Participation in the Petrocaribe summit.
5–6 September	Montego Bay (Jamaica)	Participation in the Petrocaribe summit.
7–8 December	Bridgetown (Barbados)	Participation in the 2nd Cuba–CARICOM Summit.
2006
20–22 July	Córdoba (Argentina)	Invited to the 30th summit of heads of state and government of Mercosur.
