= Álvaro Elizalde =

Chilean politician and lawyer

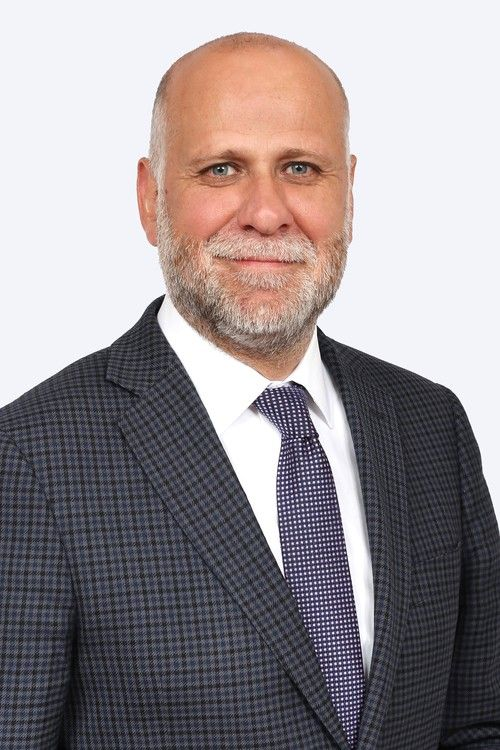
- Official portrait, 2022

Minister of the Interior and Public Security
- In office 4 March 2025 – 11 March 2026
- President: Gabriel Boric
- Preceded by: Carolina Tohá
- Succeeded by: Claudio Alvarado

Minister Secretary-General of the Presidency
- In office 19 April 2023 – 4 March 2025
- President: Gabriel Boric
- Preceded by: Ana Lya Uriarte

President of the Senate of Chile
- In office 11 March 2022 – 15 March 2023
- Preceded by: Ximena Rincón
- Succeeded by: Juan Antonio Coloma Correa

Member of the Senate of Chile
- In office 11 March 2018 – 19 April 2023
- Preceded by: Creation of the circunscription

Minister of General Secretariat of Government
- In office 11 March 2014 – 11 May 2015
- President: Michelle Bachelet
- Preceded by: Cecilia Pérez
- Succeeded by: Marcelo Díaz Díaz

Superintendent of Social Security
- In office 4 December 2008 – 11 March 2010
- Preceded by: Javier Fuenzalida
- Succeeded by: María José Zaldívar

President of the University of Chile Student Federation
- In office 1993–1994
- Preceded by: Arturo Barrios Oteiza
- Succeeded by: Rodrigo Roco

Personal details
- Born: 15 October 1969 (age 56) Talca, Chile
- Party: Socialist Party
- Spouse: Patricia Roa Ramírez
- Children: 2
- Education: University of Chile (LL.B)
- Occupation: Politician
- Profession: Lawyer

Álvaro Antonio Elizalde Soto (born 15 October 1969) is a Chilean politician and lawyer. He assumed the office of Ministry General Secretariat of the Presidency on 19 April 2023.

A member of the Socialist Party of Chile, he has served as a senator for the Maule Region since 2018 and has held several senior cabinet positions under Presidents Michelle Bachelet and Gabriel Boric. Similarly, he was President of the Senate in the 56th National Congress of Chile.

== Biography ==
Elizalde was born on 15 October 1969 in Talca. He is the son of Antonio Elizalde Hevia, an academic, former rector and rector emeritus of the Bolivarian University of Chile, founder of the Christian Left, and an international consultant for organizations such as UNICEF, UNDP, and ECLAC, and María Eugenia Soto Albornoz.

He is the partner of Patricia Roa, a lawyer specializing in labor law who has served as a programme officer at the International Labour Organization (ILO) and as president of the Fundación Trabajo para un Hermano. He is the father of two children.

He completed his primary and secondary education at Colegio Francisco de Miranda and later at Instituto de Humanidades Luis Campino in Santiago, graduating in 1986.

In 1987, he entered the University of Chile Faculty of Law, where he earned a degree in legal and social sciences. His undergraduate thesis was titled “Compendio Alfabético de varias Reales Cédulas y Órdenes expedidas para el Gobierno de América que no se hallan inclusas en la Recopilación de Indias, formado para su uso privado por Don José de Rezabal y Ugarte, Regente de la Real Audiencia de Chile.” He was admitted to the bar on 31 January 2006.

He later completed a master’s degree in constitutional law at the Pontifical Catholic University of Chile.

In his professional life, Elizalde has worked primarily in public service, combining legal, administrative, and political responsibilities within the Chilean state apparatus.

== Political career ==
Elizalde began his political activity during his student years at the University of Chile Faculty of Law. In 1989, he served as vice president of the law students’ association and later as president of the University of Chile Student Federation (FECh) between 1993 and 1994.

In 1997, he became president of the Socialist Youth (JS) and subsequently served as president of the International Union of Socialist Youth.

Prior to joining the Socialist Party of Chile, Elizalde was a member of the Christian Left, remaining active in that organization until a group of its members formally joined the Socialist Party in 1990.

In the 2001 Chilean parliamentary election, he ran as a candidate for the Chamber of Deputies in the 28th District of the Metropolitan Region, representing the Socialist Party within the Concertación por la Democracia coalition. He obtained 28,058 votes (18.94%) and was not elected.

In 2005, he was appointed deputy superintendent of the Superintendence of Social Security and on 1 November 2008 assumed the position of superintendent, serving until 11 March 2010.

Between 2010 and 2014, he served as vice president and secretary general of the Socialist Party.

During the 2013 Chilean presidential election, Elizalde participated in the campaign of Michelle Bachelet, serving as head of communications.

On 11 March 2014, he was appointed Minister Secretary-General of Government under President Michelle Bachelet, a position he held until 11 May 2015.

In the March 2017 internal elections of the Socialist Party, his list Unidad Socialista won the contest, and Elizalde was elected party president. He remained in that role until June 2022.

In June 2017, he announced his candidacy for the Senate of Chile in the 9th senatorial constituency of the Maule Region. In the 2017 Chilean general election, he was elected senator representing the Socialist Party within the La Fuerza de la Mayoría coalition, obtaining 61,828 votes (8.36%).

On 19 April 2023, he was appointed Minister Secretary-General of the Presidency, replacing Ana Lya Uriarte. He served in that role until 4 March 2025, when President Gabriel Boric appointed him Minister of the Interior and Public Security following the resignation of Carolina Tohá.
