= Juan Pablo Olave =

Chilean politician

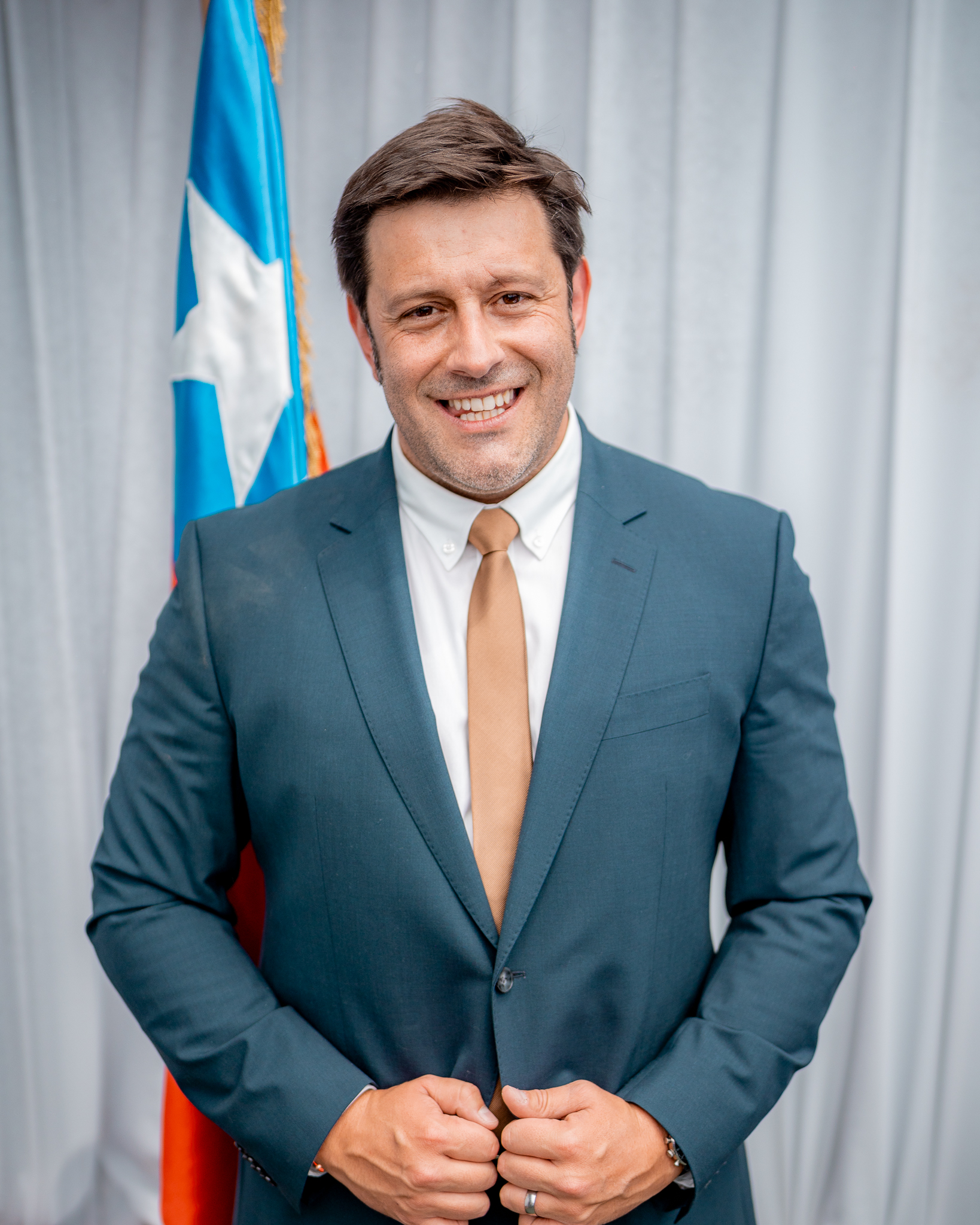
- Official portrait, 2024

Mayor of Isla de Maipo
- Incumbent
- Assumed office 28 June 2021
- Preceded by: Carlos Adasme

Personal details
- Born: Juan Pablo Olave Cambara; 8 May 1985 (age 41)
- Party: Independent

Juan Pablo Olave Cambara (born 8 May 1985) is a Chilean politician who serves as mayor of Isla de Maipo since 2021 and as vice-president of the Chilean Association of Municipalities since 2025.

== Political career ==
In the 2021 municipal elections, he ran for mayor of Isla de Maipo as an independent with the support of Chile Vamos, obtaining 37.79% of the vote. The following year, he filed a criminal complaint on behalf of the municipality against the former mayor for fraud against the public treasury; the complaint was declared admissible.

In the 2024 municipal elections, he was reelected as mayor of Isla de Maipo with 66.15% of the vote. During his tenure, Olave reported the sale of forged driver's licenses in Isla de Maipo, leading to an investigation that resulted in the arrest of seven individuals, five of whom were municipal employees, by April 2026. In May 2025, he became vice-president of the Chilean Association of Municipalities.
