= Juan Antonio Coloma Correa =

Chilean politician (born 1956)

Juan Antonio Coloma
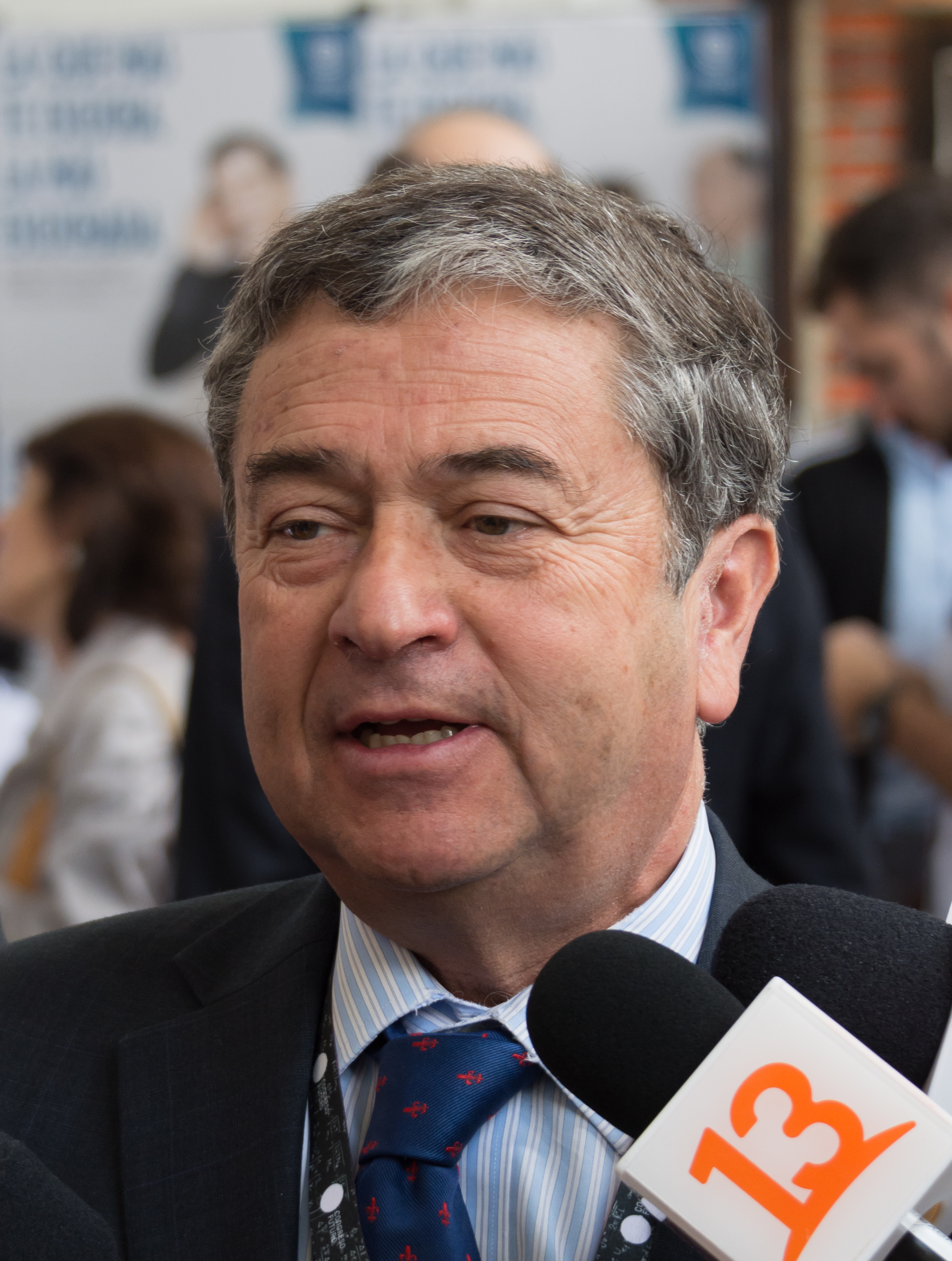
- Coloma in 2019

Ambassador of Chile to Spain
- Incumbent
- Assumed office 26 May 2026
- President: José Antonio Kast
- Preceded by: Javier Velasco

President of the Senate
- In office 15 March 2023 – 19 March 2024
- Preceded by: Álvaro Elizalde
- Succeeded by: José García Ruminot

Member of the Senate
- In office 11 March 2002 – 11 March 2026
- Preceded by: Francisco Javier Errázuriz
- Constituency: 9th Circunscription (Maule Region); 10th Circunscription (Maule Region)

President of the Independent Democratic Union
- In office 5 July 2008 – 30 March 2012
- Preceded by: Hernán Larraín
- Succeeded by: Patricio Melero

Member of the Chamber of Deputies
- In office 11 March 1990 – 11 March 2002
- Preceded by: Creation of the District
- Succeeded by: Gonzalo Uriarte

President of the Pontifical Catholic University of Chile Students Federation
- In office 1977–1978
- Preceded by: Miguel Allamand Zavala
- Succeeded by: Andrés Chadwick

Personal details
- Born: 15 July 1956 (age 70) Santiago, Chile
- Party: Independent Democratic Union
- Spouse: María Cecilia Álamos
- Children: Eight
- Parent(s): Fernando Coloma; Carmen Correa
- Relatives: Juan Antonio Coloma Mellado (grandfather); Juan Antonio Coloma Álamos (son)
- Education: Pontifical Catholic University of Chile (LL.B)
- Occupation: Politician
- Profession: Lawyer

Juan Antonio Coloma Correa (born 15 July 1956) is a Chilean politician who currently serves as Ambassador of Chile to Spain.

From 2002 to 2026 he was a member of the Senate of Chile. Similarly, he is father of the deputy Juan Antonio Coloma Álamos. On 15 March 2023 to 19 March 2024, he was elected President of the Senate.

He served as President of the Senate for the 2023–2024 legislative term. A long-time member of his party, he previously held positions as its Secretary-General (1994–2001), Vice-President (2002–2004) and President (2008–2012).

He served as a member of the Chamber of Deputies of Chile for the former 31st District for three consecutive terms (1990–2002), and later as senator for the 10th Circunscription of the Maule Region between 2002 and 2018.

Since March 2018 he has represented the reformed 9th Circunscription of the same region for the 2018–2026 legislative period.

== Biography ==
Born in Santiago, Coloma is the son of Fernando Coloma and Carmen Correa Larraín, and grandson of the conservative politician Juan Antonio Coloma Mellado.

He studied at Colegio San Ignacio de El Bosque and earned his law degree from the Pontifical Catholic University of Chile, graduating in 1979 with the «Carlos Casanueva Award». He is married to María Cecilia Álamos Jordán and has eight children, including deputy Juan Antonio Coloma Álamos.

== Political career ==
During his university years, Coloma served as vice-president (1975) and later President (1977) of the Student Federation of the Pontifical Catholic University of Chile (FEUC), appointed by the military government.

That same year he participated in the symbolic Acto de Chacarillas organised by the National Youth Front (FJUN), of which he later became president (1980–1981). He was part of the founding group of the Independent Democratic Union and a member of the Council of State that contributed to the drafting of the 1980 Constitution.

Elected to the Chamber of Deputies in the 1989 elections, he represented the 31st District (Melipilla, Talagante, Peñaflor and neighbouring communes) until 2002. During his tenure he served as Second Vice-President of the Chamber (1990–1992) and took part in committees on Government, Legislation and Regional Development.

In 2001 Coloma was elected senator for the Maule Region (10th Circunscription), being re-elected in 2009. In the upper house he chaired the Standing Committees on Foreign Affairs, Agriculture, and Public Works, and participated in the Bicameral Committee on Budgets. As party president (2008–2012), he oversaw the UDI's consolidation within the Alianza coalition and supported the presidential campaign of Joaquín Lavín.

Re-elected in 2017 for the newly created 9th Circunscription, he continued to serve in the Senate, chairing the Committees on Finance (2022–2023) and later on Future, Science and Innovation from 2024 onwards. Throughout his career, Coloma has been regarded as one of the principal conservative leaders of the Chilean right.

On 26 May 2026, he was appointed by President José Antonio Kast as Ambassador of Chile to Spain.
