= Isla de Maipo =

Commune in Santiago Metropolitan Region, Chile

- Commune and town
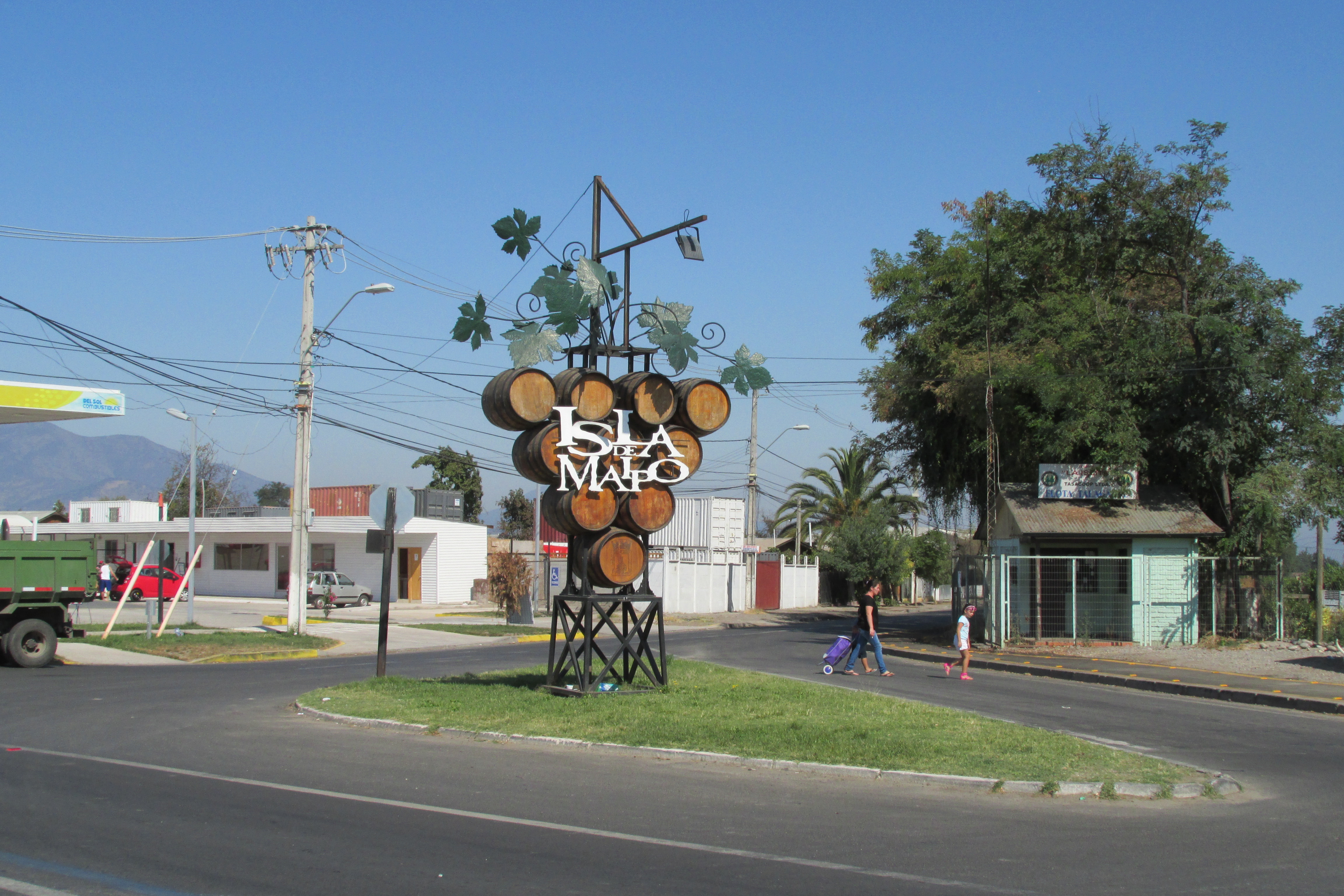
- Road entrance

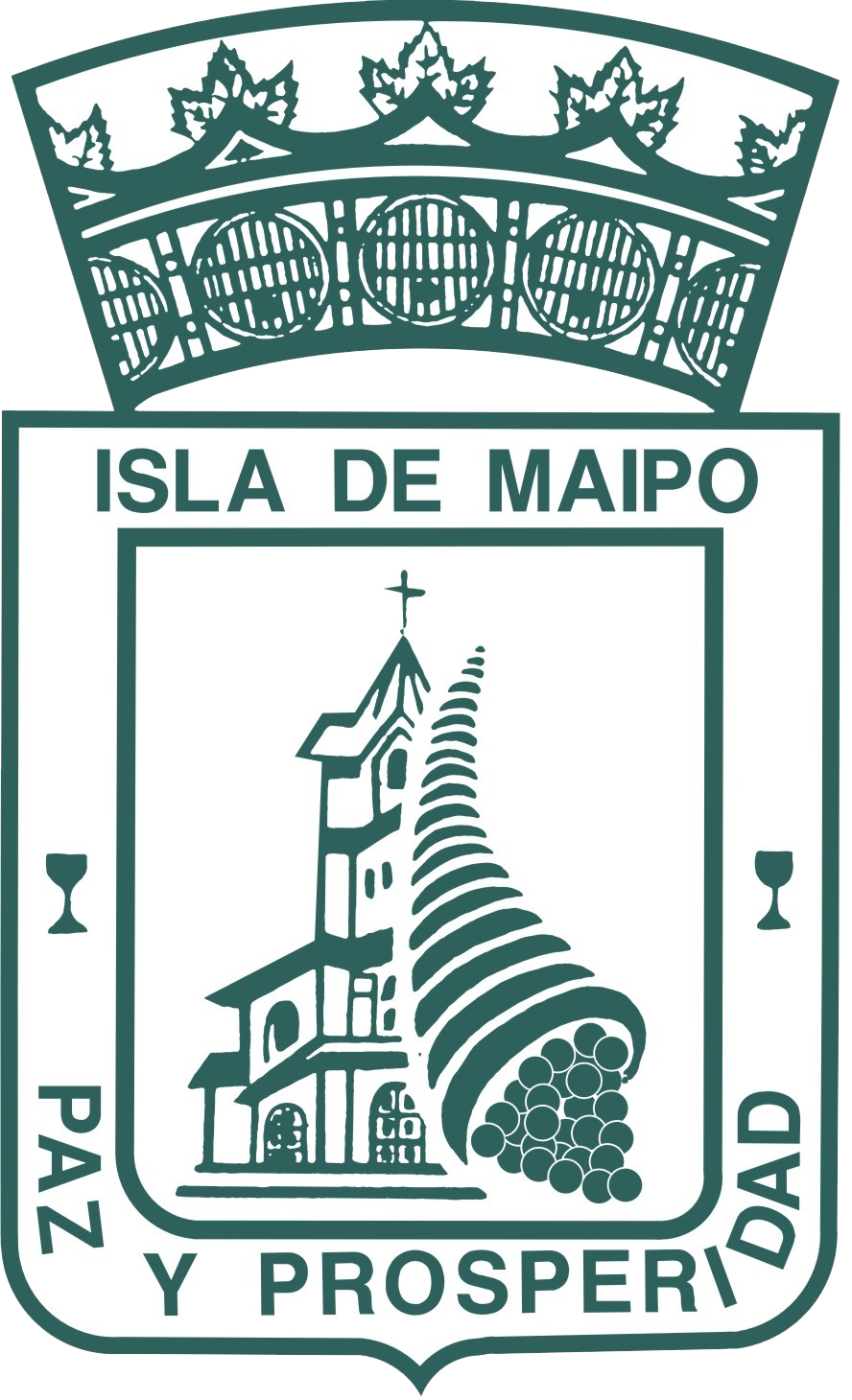
- Flag Coat of arms Location in the Santiago Metropolitan Region Location in Chile
- Coordinates: 33°45′S 70°54′W
- Country: Chile
- Region: Santiago Metropolitan
- Province: Talagante

Government
  - Type: Municipality
  - Mayor: Juan Pablo Olave (Ind.)

Area
  - Total: 189 km^{2} (73 sq mi)
  - Rank: 1

Population (2017 Census)
  - Total: 36,219
  - Rank: 5
  - Density: 192/km^{2} (496/sq mi)
  - Urban: 26,941
  - Rural: 9,278

Sex
  - Men: 18,051
  - Women: 18,168
- Time zone: UTC-4 (CLT)
  - Summer (DST): UTC-3 (CLST)
- Area code: 56 + 53
- Website: Municipality of Isla de Maipo

Isla de Maipo is a town and commune of the Talagante Province in central Chile's Santiago Metropolitan Region.

== Geography ==
Isla de Maipo can be found in the Chilean Central Valley approximately 40 km (25 mi) southwest of the metropolitan area of Santiago and about 12 km (7 mi) from the city of Talagante. The commune spans an area of 189 km^{2} (73 sq mi). In general, the commune is characterized as predominantly rural, which is reflected in its landscape of colonial houses, cultivated farms, vineyards, natural sites and the predominance of agricultural activities, which is carried out by the majority of its population. The Maipo River is the most important in the whole metropolitan area, because it supports the highest population density in Chile and is also the main stream which irrigates the area.

== Traditions ==
One of its traditions is the Fiesta de La Virgen de La Merced. This feast is celebrated the last Sunday of September each year and attracts more than 80,000 pilgrims from all parts of the region, across the country and abroad.

La Fiesta de la Vendimia (a grape harvest feast) is celebrated every year, calling together local inhabitants and foreign tourists. The festival allows tourists to familiarize themselves with the culinary art of the commune, especially the high quality of its wines. The Plaza de Armas is converted into a large dining room, where one can hear folk and other varieties of music.

== Demographics ==
According to the 2017 census of the National Statistics Institute, Isla de Maipo had 36,219 inhabitants (18,051 men and 18,168 women). Of these, 26,941 (74.4%) lived in urban areas and 9,278 (25.6%) in rural areas. The population grew by 40.39% (10,421 persons) between the 2002 and 2017 censuses; during this period, the female population surpassed the male population, going from 49% to 50.2%.

== Administration ==
As a commune, Isla de Maipo is a third-level administrative division of Chile, administered by a municipal council headed by a mayor who is directly elected every four years. Since 2021, the mayor has been Juan Pablo Olave (Independent). For the 2024–2028 term, the council members are:

- Richard Herrera (REP)
- Miguel Olave (UDI)
- Maximiliano Genskowski (UDI)
- Hernan Leiva (RN)
- Jorge Alfaro (FA)
- Verónica Vargas (Ind./UDI)

Within the electoral divisions of Chile, Isla de Maipo is represented in the Chamber of Deputies by Juan Irarrázaval (REP), Jaime Coloma (UDI), Raúl Leiva (PS), Diego Vergara (REP), Ignacio Achurra (FA), and Marisela Santibáñez (PC) for the 2026–2030 term, as part of the 14th electoral district. The commune is represented in the Senate by Rojo Edwards (Ind.), Luciano Cruz-Coke (EVO), Manuel Ossandón (UDI), Fabiola Campillai (Ind.), and Claudia Pascual (PC) for the 2022–2030 term, as part of the 6th senatorial constituency (Santiago Metropolitan Region).

== Gallery ==
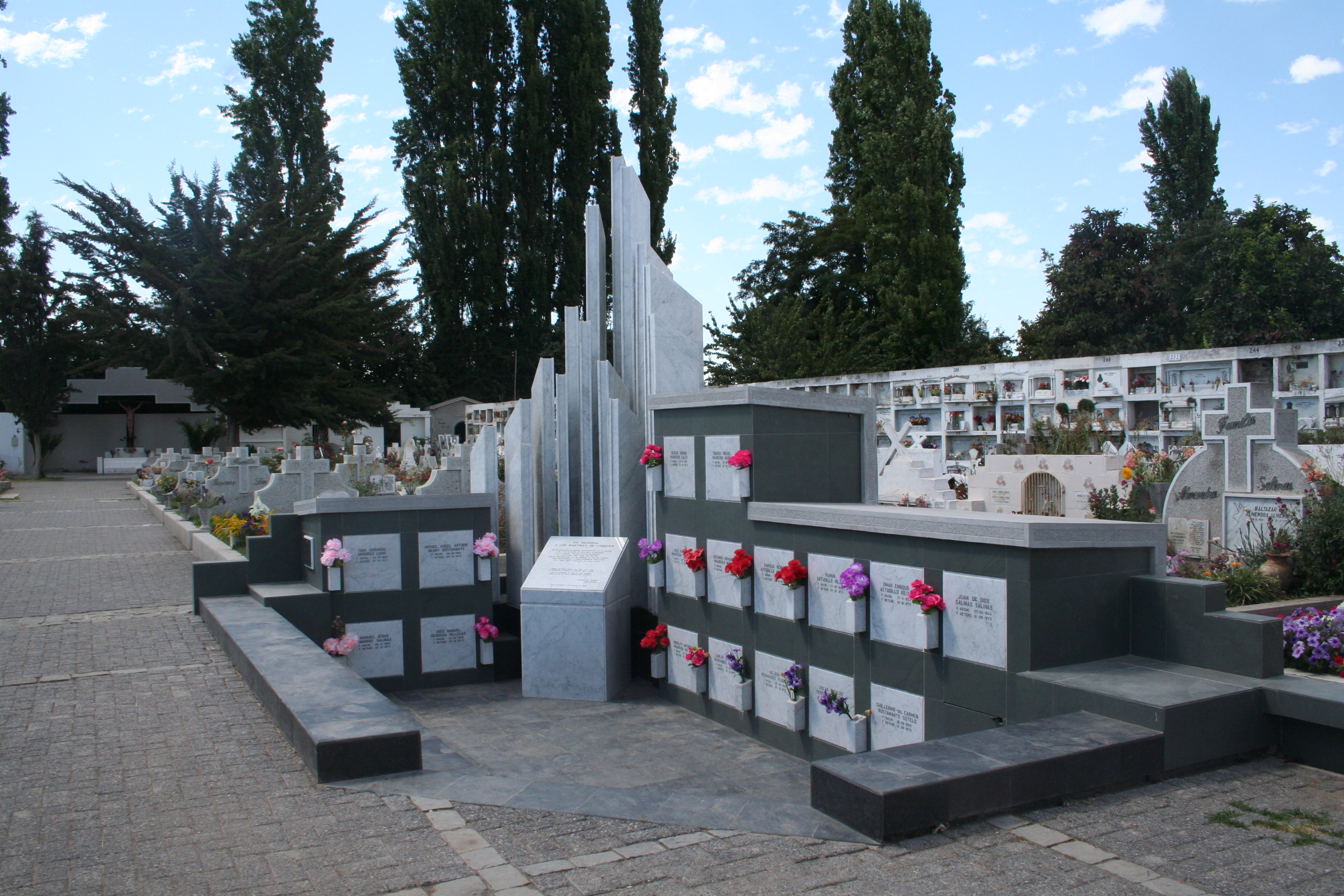
Human rights memorial

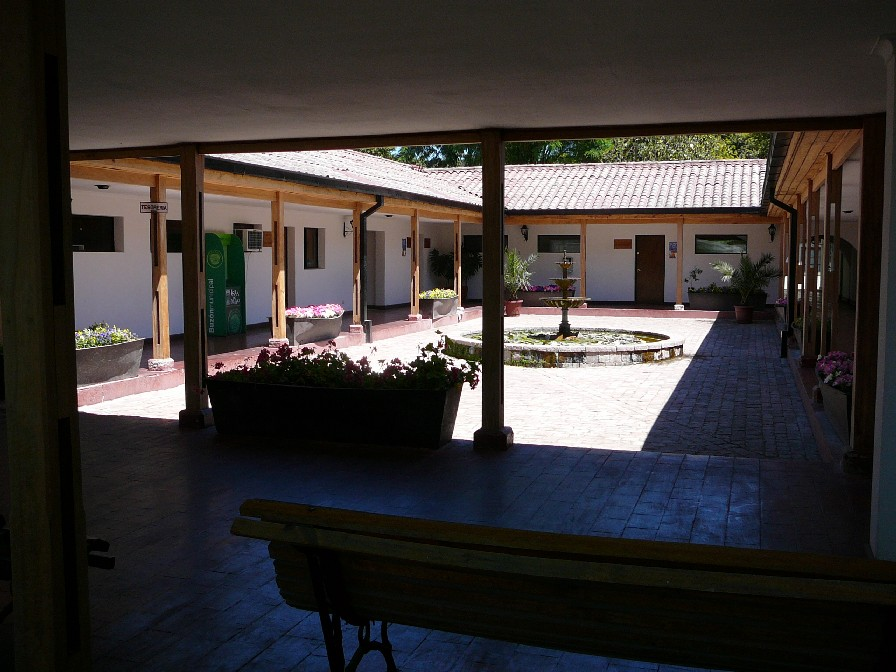
Town hall

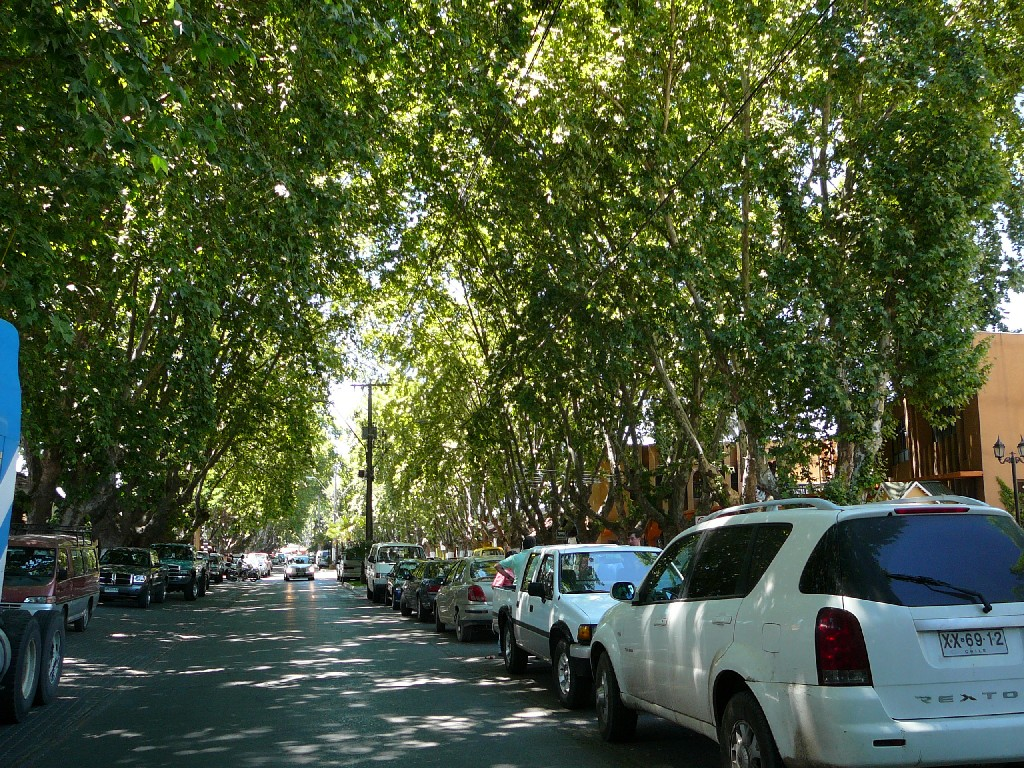
Santelices avenue
