= Martín Zilic =

Chilean politician

Minister of Education
- In office 11 March 2006 – 14 July 2006
- Preceded by: Marigen Hornkohl
- Succeeded by: Yasna Provoste

Intendant of the Bío-Bío Region
- In office 11 March 1994 – 11 March 2000
- Preceded by: Adolfo Veloso
- Succeeded by: Jaime Tohá

Personal details
- Born: 22 April 1974 (age 52) Calama, Chile
- Party: Christian Democratic Party
- Spouse: María Soledad Viel de la Maza
- Children: Three
- Education: University of Concepción (BA); Catholic University of Louvain (MA)
- Occupation: Politician
- Profession: Physician

Martín Nicolás Zilic Hrepic (born 22 April 1947) is a Chilean physician and former politician. While a student in the University of Concepción he participated in the November 18, 1971, meeting with Fidel Castro. During his time as Minister of Education he had to face the 2006 student protests in Chile.

== Biography ==
The son of Croatian immigrants, he completed his secondary education at San Luis School of Antofagasta. He later qualified as a physician and surgeon from the University of Concepción in January 1976. He obtained a Master of Science degree with a specialization in general surgery from the Catholic University of Louvain, Belgium, and a second Master of Science degree, specializing in intensive care and resuscitation, from the same institution in 1983.

Between 1992 and 1994, he served as director of the Regional Clinical Hospital of Concepción. He later served as Intendant of the Biobío Region during the administration of his close friend Eduardo Frei Ruiz-Tagle (1994–2000).

After returning to academic life, between 2000 and 2005 he promoted the creation of the Biotechnology Center at the University of Concepción, becoming its first director. Together with UNIDO, he organized the First Global Biotechnology Forum, held in Concepción between 2 and 5 March 2004.

In March 2006, Bachelet asked him to serve as Minister of Education. Only a few months into his tenure, he was confronted with the most significant student protests in Chile in more than thirty years, driven by widespread dissatisfaction among students with the state of public education in the country's municipal secondary schools.

President Bachelet requested his resignation on 14 July 2006. He left office alongside Andrés Zaldívar (Interior) and Ingrid Antonijevic (Economy, Development and Reconstruction). Following his departure from government, he returned to the University of Concepción.

In 2011, he unsuccessfully sought his party's nomination for mayor of Concepción.

He is married in his second marriage to María Soledad Biel de la Maza.
