= Juan Antonio Coloma Mellado =

Chilean politician (1906 - 1961)

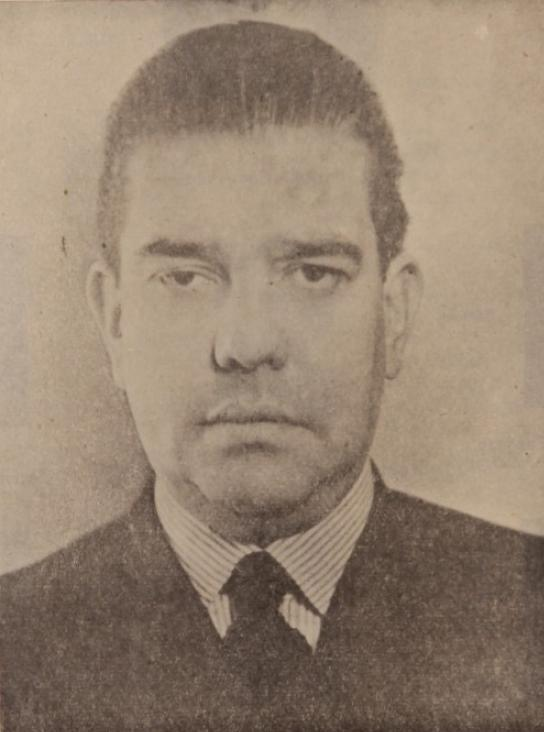

Member of the Senate
- In office 15 June 1953 – 28 February 1961
- Constituency: Rancagua

President of the Chamber of Deputies
- In office 1945–1949
- Preceded by: Sebastián Santandreu
- Succeeded by: Raúl Brañes

Member of the Chamber of Deputies
- In office 15 June 1949 – 15 June 1953
- Constituency: Rancagua
- In office 15 June 1941 – 15 June 1933

Personal details
- Born: 1 January 1906 Los Ángeles, Chile
- Died: 28 February 1961 (aged 55) Machalí, Chile
- Party: United Conservative Party
- Spouse: Raquel Reyes Moya
- Education: University of Chile
- Occupation: Politician and lawyer

Juan Antonio Coloma Mellado (1 January 1906 - 28 February 1961) was a Chilean lawyer and conservative politician, who served as the president of the Chamber of Deputies of Chile.

== Early life ==
Mellado was born to Jaun Antonio Coloma Mora and Natalia Mellado Zabala. He was educated in St. Ignatius College and the Lyceum of Los Angeles. He studied law in the Pontifical Catholic University of Chile, but graduated from the University of Chile, becoming a lawyer in 1928 with the thesis "The bill on the issuance of bonds by public limited companies: debentures."

He married Raquel Reyes Moya in 1928. They had one son, Cesar Fernando Coloma Reyes. His grandson went on to become current senator Juan Antonio Coloma Correa and his great-grandson is politician Juan Antonio Coloma Álamos.

=== Professional career ===
Mellado served as director of the Banco del Estado de Chile and the Industrial Credit Institute. He was also president of the Election Certification Court. He served as secretary of the Internal Taxation Service and an official in the Ministry of Finance.

He served as the lawyer of the president of Chile in 1932. Additionally, he represented various businesses in court, such as El Salto Textile Company, The Trans-Andean Insurance Company, and the Sanitas and Anilias Institute.

== Political career ==
He was a member of the Conservative Party and the Traditionalist Conservative Party, serving as its president from 1952 to 53. In 1953, he merged the conservative movements of Chile into the United Conservative Party, also serving as President of this new party (1957).

He was elected deputy of the 19th electoral group of Laja, Mulchén and Angol (1933–1937) and served in the Development Committee. He was re-elected deputy (1937–1941) and served in the Education Committee.

In 1941, he was elected deputy again, this time representing the 7th departmental group, corresponding to the 1st Metropolitan District: Santiago. He was a member of the Economy and Commerce Commission. In 1945, he was re-elected. He served as President of the Chamber of Deputies for the entire period.

In 1949, he was elected deputy for the 1st Metropolitan District: Santiago. During this period he belonged to the Constitution, Legislation and Justice Committee.

In 1953, he was elected senator for the 5th provincial group of O'Higgins and Colchagua. During this period he participated in the Senate's permanent National Defense Committee.

In March 1957 he was appointed president of the Electoral Qualifying Court, and on March 11 resigned from the presidency of the United Conservative Party. In addition, he had been nominated as a candidate for President of Chile by the Youth Wing of the Traditionalist Conservative Party, but declined when the candidacy of Jorge Alessandri Rodríguez was announced.

He died without completing his senatorial term, at 12:07 A.M. on February 28, 1961, in Machalí of a heart attack. He appeared on the ballot for the elections, receiving 7,240 votes posthumously.

During a session of the Senate in December 2019, Coloma Mellado was mentioned by his grandson, Juan Antonio Coloma Correa, who recalled that when his grandfather was president of the Chamber, female suffrage was granted, to which Senator Alfonso de Urresti replied that "Grandchildren are more conservative than their grandparents."

== Electoral history ==
=== 1961 parliamentary elections ===
- 1961 parliamentary elections: Candidate for Senator Fifth Provincial Group; O'Higgins and Colchagua

== Bibliography ==
- Ramón Folch, Armando de (1999). "Biografías de Chilenos: Miembros de los Poderes Ejecutivos, Legislativo y Judicial". Vol. Tomo II (2.ª ed.). Santiago, Chile: Ediciones Universidad Católica.
- Valencia Aravia, Luis (1986). "Anales de la República: registros de los ciudadanos que han integrado los Poderes Ejecutivo y Legislativo" (2.ª ed.). Santiago, Chile: Editorial Andrés Bello.
- Urzúa Valenzuela, Germán (1992). "Historia Política de Chile y su Evolución Electoral desde 1810 a 1992" (3.ª ed.). Santiago, Chile: Editorial Jurídica de Chile.
