= Jaime Bellolio =

Chilean business administrator and politician

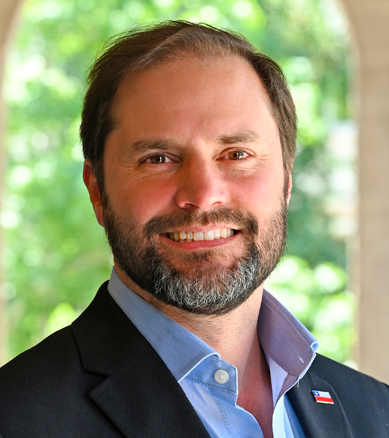
- Official portrait, 2024

Mayor of Providencia
- Incumbent
- Assumed office 6 December 2024
- Preceded by: Evelyn Matthei

Ministry General Secretariat of Government
- In office 28 July 2020 – 11 March 2022
- President: Sebastián Piñera
- Preceded by: Cecilia Pérez
- Succeeded by: Camila Vallejo

Member of the Chamber of Deputies
- In office 11 March 2018 – 28 July 2020
- Preceded by: Creation of the district
- Succeeded by: Nora Cuevas
- Constituency: 14th district
- In office 11 March 2014 – 11 March 2018
- Preceded by: José Antonio Kast
- Succeeded by: District dissolved
- Constituency: 30th district

Independent Democratic Union Assistant Secretary General
- In office 30 March 2012 – 10 May 2014
- Preceded by: Felipe Salaberry
- Succeeded by: Pablo Terrazas

President of the Federation of Students of the Pontifical Catholic University of Chile
- In office 2002–2003
- Preceded by: Enrique Álvarez
- Succeeded by: Julio Pertuzé

Personal details
- Born: 29 November 1980 (age 45) Santiago, Chile
- Party: Independent Democratic Union (UDI)
- Spouse: Teresita Zalaquett (m. 2006)
- Children: 4
- Parent(s): Jaime Bellolio Rodríguez; Margarita Avaria
- Relatives: Blas Bellolio (grandfather); Álvaro Bellolio (brother); Cristóbal Bellolio (cousin)
- Education: Pontifical Catholic University of Chile (B.Sc); University of Chicago (M.D.)
- Occupation: Politician
- Profession: Business runner Public administrator

Jaime Andrés Bellolio Avaria (born 29 November 1980) is a Chilean business administrator and politician who has served as the mayor of Providencia since 2024.

A member of the Independent Democratic Union (UDI), Bellolio served as a member of the Chamber of Deputies from 2014 to 2020, and as Minister Secretary General of the Government during the second government of president Sebastián Piñera (2018–2022).

== Background and education ==
He was born on 29 November 1980 in Santiago, to public accountant and business runner Jaime Bellolio Rodríguez and Margarita María Avaria Benapres.

His grandfather, Blas Bellolio Zappettini, was a senator for the Seventh Provincial Assembly of Ñuble, Concepción, and Arauco between 1953 and 1961. His brother, Álvaro, was head of the Department of Immigration and Migration (DEM) from March 2018 to 2021, being the last to hold that position.

His first cousin, Cristóbal Bellolio, of liberal persuasion, is a lawyer, political scientist, and PhD in political philosophy from the Pontifical Catholic University (PUC).

In 1998, he graduated from secondary education at the Cordillera School in Las Condes, where he served as president of the Student Council. He later entered the Pontifical Catholic University of Chile, earning a degree in business administration, and serving as president of the Students' Federation. Thanks to a scholarship, he completed a master's degree in public policy at the University of Chicago (United States), specializing in education, health, public safety, and transportation.

== Professional career ==
In 2005, he joined the Jaime Guzmán Foundation, working on education and public policy issues, serving as deputy director. He later coordinated the program "Youth in the Service of Chile", a position he held until 2007. In 2008, he worked as a consultant for the Education Vicariate of the Archdiocese of Santiago.

In the academic field, between 2005 and 2012, he was an associate assistant professor at PUC and a postgraduate professor in the Master of Public Policy program at the University for Development (UDD). After completing his term as Minister of State in March 2022, he joined the new Territorial Coexistence Observatory at the Andrés Bello University.

== Political career ==
At the Pontifical Catholic University, he was active in student leadership as a member of the Guildist Movement (MGUC). He served as counselor, president of his faculty, and president of the Pontifical Catholic University of Chile Students Federation (FEUC) in 2003, a board that also included Arturo Squella as secretary general. In 2004, he was named one of the "100 Young Leaders" by El Sábado magazine of the El Mercurio newspaper.

He is a member of the Independent Democratic Union (UDI) party, where he served as deputy secretary between 2012 and 2014. He was also chief of staff to then-deputy José Antonio Kast (during the 2006–2010 term).

In the 2013 parliamentary elections, he was elected as a deputy for the former 30th district of the Metropolitan Region, representing the UDI (within the Chile Vamos coalition), for the 2014–2018 legislative term. He served on the standing committees on Economy, Development, Micro, Small and Medium Enterprises (SMEs), Consumer Protection and Tourism; Education; and Human Rights and Indigenous Peoples.

In the 2017 parliamentary elections, he was re-elected, this time for the new 14th district of the same region, for the 2018–2022 term. He served on the standing committees on Education and Health.

In parallel, in 2018, he was honored by the University of Chicago with the "Rising Star Award". However, on 28 July 2020, he ended his parliamentary term early to take on the position of Minister Secretary General of Government, appointed by President Sebastián Piñera. To fill his seat in the Chamber of Deputies, the UDI leadership appointed mayor of San Bernardo Nora Cuevas.

In October 2024, Jaime Bellolio ran for mayor of the Providencia commune in the municipal elections, being elected with 59.39% of the votes. He took office on 6 December 2024.

== Personal life ==
He has been married since 2006 to Teresita Zalaquett Jiménez, with whom he has four children: Jaime, Raimundo, Vicente, and León.
