= Marisela Santibáñez =

Chilean politician and media personality (born 1975)

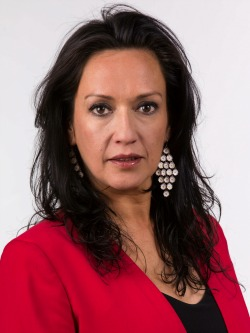
- Santibáñez in 2018

Member of the Chamber of Deputies
- Incumbent
- Assumed office 11 March 2018
- Preceded by: District created
- Constituency: District 14

Personal details
- Born: Marisela del Carmen Santibáñez Novoa; 24 April 1975 (age 50) Santiago, Chile
- Party: Progressive (2010–2019); Communist (2019–present)
- Occupation: Actress, presenter, politician

Marisela del Carmen Santibáñez Novoa (born 24 April 1975) is a Chilean actress, presenter, and politician of the Communist Party (PCCh). She has been a member of the Chamber of Deputies for District 14 since March 2018.

== Biography ==
Marisela Santibáñez was born in Santiago on 24 April 1975, the younger of two daughters of Rosario Novoa Benavente and Ricardo Fernando Santibáñez Moya. She grew up on Avenida Las Rejas in Estación Central, and completed her secondary education at the Luis Pasteur School in Providencia.

In 2003, she gave birth to a daughter, who died from leukemia in June 2011.

== Media career ==
Santibáñez studied theater under the guidance of Patricio Achurra, as well as social communication. In 2000, she starred in an advertisement for the Tapsin brand that received international awards.

She has hosted and participated as a panelist on several television programs. In 2002, she hosted the late-night program La plancha on Mega. She was a panelist on the talk show Acoso textual in 2004, and later on the show business program SQP. She competed on the reality shows La Granja VIP (2005) and 1910 (2009), both on Canal 13.

She is an outspoken fan of the Colo-Colo football club, and has appeared on sports programs such as Show de goles and Jugados.

On radio, she hosted the program Capeando la tarde on Radio Carolina for nearly a decade, receiving an APES Award for "Radio Revelation" from the Association of Entertainment Journalists in 2001. In 2008, she returned to host the program on Píntame FM.

== Political career ==
Santibáñez actively participated in the presidential candidacy of Marco Enríquez-Ominami in 2009. She later joined the Progressive Party (PRO), which he formed in 2010.

In June 2013, the PRO announced her as a candidate for deputy for District 30 in that November's parliamentary election, as part of the coalition If You Want It, Chile Changes. She received the majority of popular votes, but was not elected because, by the rules of the binomial system which rewards the two highest-voted lists, her list finished third behind those of Nueva Mayoría and the Alliance.

In the 2016 municipal elections, she was the Yo Marco por el Cambio coalition's candidate for mayor of San Bernardo, receiving 13,079 votes – equivalent to 25.54% – and losing to Independent Democratic Union candidate Nora Cuevas.

She again competed for a seat in the Chamber of Deputies, this time for the new District 14, in the 2017 parliamentary election. She received 35,913 votes – equivalent to 11.9% of the total – and was elected, becoming the PRO's first deputy and its sole representative in the legislative session that began on 11 March 2018.

She is a member of the permanent commissions for culture and the arts, sports and recreation, and citizen security. She is part of the special investigative commissions on investment in hospitals and hiring of personnel, on irregularities in actions of ENAMI related to contracts awarded to Inversiones SZ, on acts of the government related to the search for missing or disappeared minors, and on acts of the administration linked to the operation of La Chimba landfill.

Santibáñez was part of the PRO's parliamentary committee until March 2019, when she submitted her resignation to the party, becoming an independent deputy. In September 2019, she joined the PCCh.

In October 2025, Santibáñez introduced legislation to make Chile the first country to ban octopus farming, citing environmental and animal welfare concerns.
