= 2006 student protests in Chile =

The 2006 student protests in Chile (also known as the Penguins' Revolution or The March of the Penguins, because of the students' uniform) were a series of ongoing student voice protests carried out by high school students across Chile (from late April to early June 2006) against the privatization of the Chilean education system, implemented by dictator Augusto Pinochet in the 1970s. The protests peaked on May 30, when 790,000 students adhered to strikes and protests throughout the country, becoming Chile's largest student demonstration in three decades and the first political crisis of president Michelle Bachelet's administration.

Over 400 educational establishments adhered to the protests and paralyzed all classes and extracurricular activities. The protests started with the early and organized support of 100 establishments (schools) that started taking action on Friday, May 26.

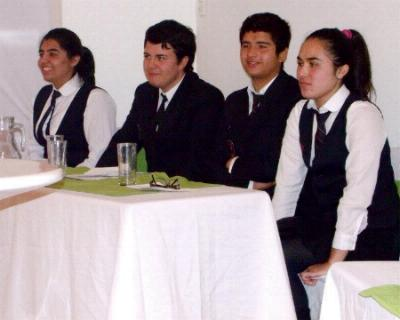
Chilean school uniform, known as the "Penguin uniform" for its monochrome tones

Amongst the students' short-term demands were free travel passes on buses and the waiving of the university admissions test (PSU) fee, while the longer term demands included: the abolition of the Organic Constitutional Act of Teaching (LOCE), the end to municipalization of subsidized education, a reform to the Full-time School Day policy (JEC) and a quality education for all.

On June 1, Bachelet addressed the nation by television, announcing several new measures for education that met most of the students' demands. On June 7 the president announced a 73-member presidential advisory committee – promised by Bachelet on her speech to discuss the students' long-term demands – which included six seats reserved for high school students. Initially hesitant to join the committee, on June 9 the student assembly finally accepted the invitation and called for an immediate end to strikes and school take-overs.

On August 23, around 2,000 students were marching in Santiago and other cities in the country, in protest of the slow speed that the reforms were taking place. The rally eventually got violent when small groups turned away from the peaceful demonstrations and started throwing rocks at the police. The police responded with tear gas and water cannons. More than 200 of the demonstrators were arrested and over a dozen were injured.

== Background ==
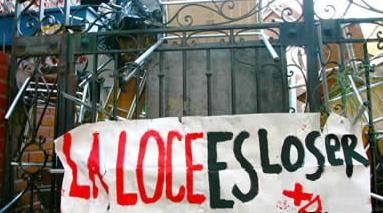
A banner in an occupied school reads "The LOCE is a loser".

The Organic Constitutional Act of Teaching or LOCE (Act Nº 18,962) was enacted on March 7, 1990, and came into force on March 10, the last day of Pinochet's 16 1/2 year dictatorship. Despite being widely criticized by both students and teachers as well as the ruling coalition (Concertación), it has remained largely unmodified since the restoration of democracy.

Critics of LOCE point out that it reduces the state's participation in education to a solely regulatory and protective role, whilst the true responsibility of education has been transferred to private and public corporations (public schools being managed by local governments — Municipalidades), thus reducing the participation that students, parents, teachers and non-academic employees had previously enjoyed in their schools.

During the 1990s, one of the main objectives of the Concertación administration was a so-called Educational Reform. One of the main pillars of this reform, launched during the Eduardo Frei Ruiz-Tagle administration, was the Jornada Escolar Completa, JEC (Full-time School Day policy) — a plan to increase the hours that high school students actually spend in classrooms (in many cases not increasing the number of additional classrooms and other infrastructure required). However, many consider that the quality of education has dropped to worrying levels despite the high level of government spending on public education. Studies have shown that the JEC still has not been correctly implemented nor has it achieved the desired results.

Since 2000 a new demand has emerged with respect to the transport system's school pass and the new University Selection Test, and although much progress was made in some areas, the core of the students' demands have remained unsolved as of 2006.

The Penguin Movements were not a new phenomenon: its roots lie in the nineteenth century. Modern Chile has one of the highest levels of inequality in the world. Yet the country enjoyed a remarkable political stability since the return to democracy in 1990. In October 2019, though, what had seemed to be an oasis within Latin America erupted as the most intense and dramatic social unrest in Chilean recent history. Inequality is at the root of this social earthquake. The President and his advisors seemed to be puzzled: they thought that the negative consequences of inequality on well-being had been counterbalanced by the high average income of Chileans. If Chile wants to continue human-capital based development following the model of high-income countries, stronger redistribution elements in the tax system are necessary to reduce inequality.

== Initial demonstrations ==
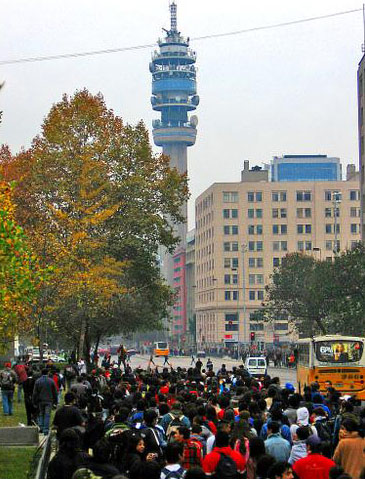
Demonstrators march on Santiago during the Revolution

On April 25, 2006, the first mobilization took place at the A-45 Carlos Cousiño high school in Lota, the students took over the school demanding better infrastructure conditions. Every year the school was flooded by the rains.

Following the announcement on April 26 of a new increase in fees for the PSU (up to $28,000 Chilean Pesos or around US$50) and the rumored introduction of a new restriction in the students' transport pass (Pase Escolar) that would limit reduced bus fares to only two travels per day, several public schools in Santiago organized demonstrations in the Alameda Avenue (Santiago's main street) demanding gratuity for transport passes, bus fares and university admissions tests. These demonstrations ended in some outbursts of violence — the Carabineros (the uniformed police) subsequently arrested 47 secondary students on April 26.

In the following days, new demonstrations took place without the permission of the regional authority. Despite the Ministry of Education acceding to minor demands, the students were left unsatisfied.

On May Day, secondary students of Santiago took part in a massive demonstration on Parque Almagro, near downtown Santiago. Violence again erupted and 1,024 students were arrested by the police in Santiago as well as in other cities throughout the country. The violence was consequently condemned by the Government.

Nothing justifies violence, violence is not the way and the government backs the actions of the police. The students have accomplished nothing

— Felipe Harboe, Deputy Minister of Interior, May 10, 2006

== Take-overs ==
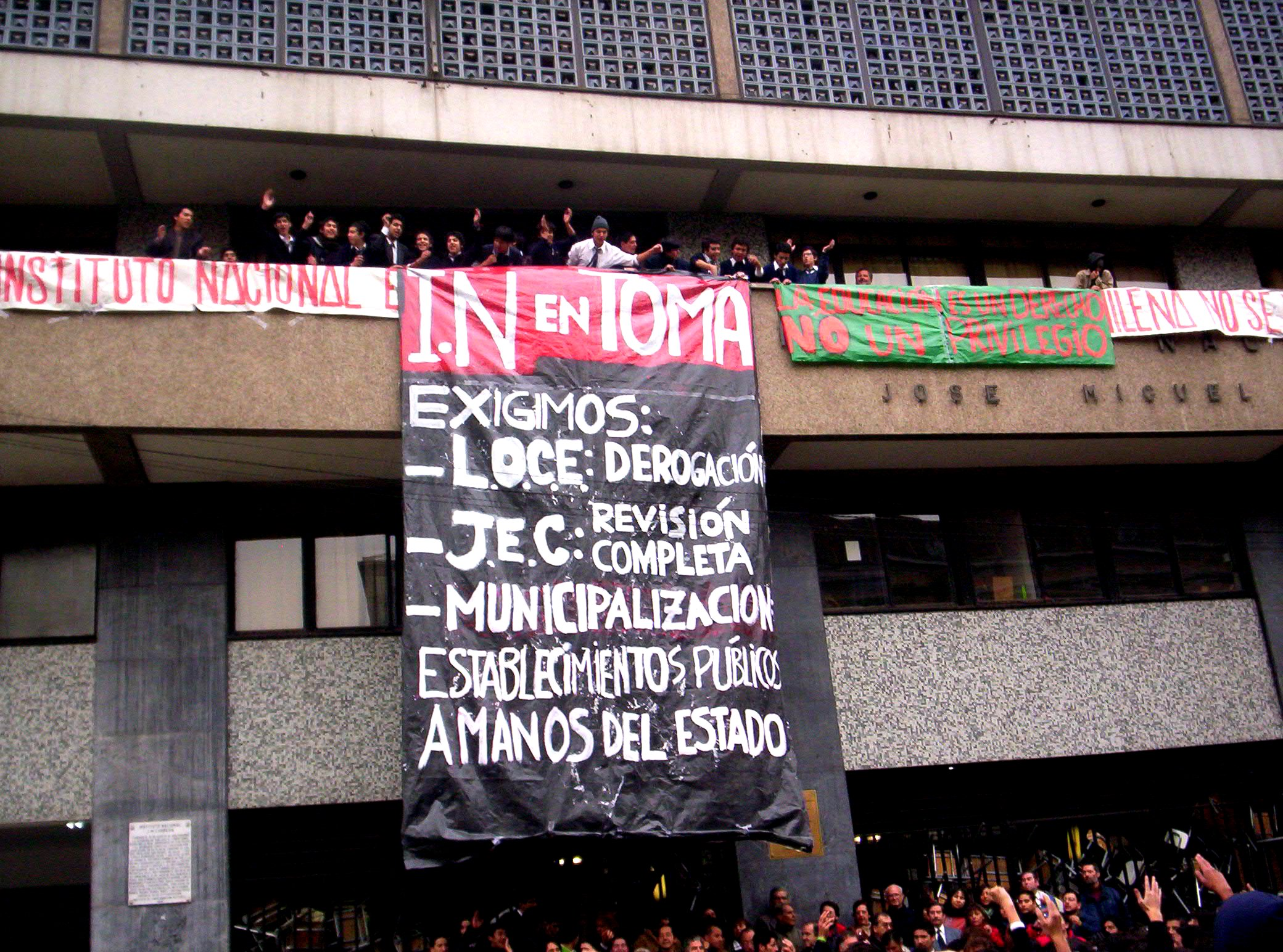
Instituto Nacional occupied en toma, May 19, 2006

Following three weeks of protests, little progress for the students' demands had been achieved. A turning point arose when students of the prestigious school Instituto Nacional and Liceo de Aplicación overran the school campuses during the night of May 19, 2006 demanding an improvement in the educational reform including: the ending of the system of schools being run by municipalities (present since 1982), the abolition of the LOCE, as well as a clear declaration by President Bachelet in her traditional May 21 speech to the National Congress. In her speech, the President only indirectly referred to the students' demands and instead focused in condemning the students' recent acts of violence.

I want our citizens to be critical, self-conscious, and to express their ideas and demands. However, the criticism must be expressed in a constructive manner, laying clear proposals upon a table, and most importantly, with an unveiled face without resorting to violence. I want to be crystal clear in this, what we have witnessed in the past weeks is unacceptable. I shall not tolerate acts of vandalism or intimidation. We won democracy without resorting to concealing our faces and we shall continue [enjoying it] without doing so (this was in reference to the practice of certain individuals who anonymously partook in violence under the cover of hoods).

— Michelle Bachelet, Presidential Speech, May 21, 2006

The government's reply did not satisfy the students' leaders who called for the continuation of demonstrations, even though the Instituto Nacional students desisted in its school take-over in exchange for a school strike which was supported by teachers, parents and the school administrators alike. Occupations of several Liceos (public high schools) continued — among others Liceo A-13 (formerly, Confederación Suiza) and Liceo Carmela Carvajal — and two failed attempts to occupy the Liceo José Victorino Lastarria in Providencia. Although peaceful, the occupations were rejected by the government and the Education Minister Martín Zilic, broke off negotiations stating that he would not come back to the table as long as the mobilizations continued.

In order to move forward in a discussion about quality, we need everybody's participation (...) that's a dialogue, not with occupations of schools, not with violence on the streets, not with covered faces. The president said we won democracy with uncovered faces and we are going to maintain talks with an uncovered face as a lesson to some youths in Santiago who have occupied their schools; that's not the way. The path is through dialogue, that is the way you build a better education and make a big leap to the future

— Martín Zilic, Coyhaique, May 23, 2006

However, the ministerial strategy of avoiding dialogue did not work out. Since April 24, there were fourteen schools either occupied or on strike including the Liceo Nº1 de Niñas — the school that President Bachelet herself attended as a student.

What is not understandable is that while trying to talk, there's also the applying of pressure. That is not the way to create dialogue in a democracy. It is terrific that they have chosen to reveal their faces. Now what they must do is to be able to dialogue seriously, but with a will to negotiate from both sides. The government is willing to discuss many topics, but it must be done with respect and without pressure. The government has already shown that it agrees to seek a solution on the PSU and the school bus pass, jointly with the ministries of Transportation, Education, and Finance, and they know this...regarding the JEC, they know that I am interested in knowing their evaluation of the JEC, if they consider that it isn't fulfilling its objective, what we want is to improve the quality of education, we are completely available to listen to everything.

— President Michelle Bachelet

That same night, eleven schools in Santiago downtown, Ñuñoa, Estación Central, La Cisterna, Maipú, Providencia and Recoleta were occupied by students. The students received political support from deputies from the governing coalition, the College of Teachers and other institutions, leaving Minister Zilic in a fragile position. He finally called for a new round of negotiations with "all representatives of schools in conflict" which was scheduled for the following Monday May 29. Throughout the day, more schools were occupied in Arica, Iquique, Valparaíso, Rancagua and Concepción.

School movement
Date	Occupied	On Strike	Total
Friday 19	2	0	2
Sunday 21	2	0	2
Monday 22	1	4	5
Tuesday 23	6	8	14
Wednesday 24	17	10	27
Thursday 25	24	16	40
Friday 26	~30	> 70	> 100
Tuesday 30	320	> 100	> 420

On May 26, the situation escalated, as students from Maipú, San Miguel, Las Condes, Puente Alto and Pudahuel carried out peaceful marches and private schools adhered to the events. One-hundred thousand students (and up to a 100 schools) were on mass demonstrations throughout the country. Meanwhile, the ACES called for a national strike on Tuesday May 30, which was supported by the Student Federation of the University of Chile (FECH), and the Teachers National Union.

Public opinion became increasingly critical of the government and its mishandling of the crisis, forcing President Bachelet to express her will to reestablish a dialogue "in an agenda without exclusions" but reaffirming that this new stand was not a contradiction nor a defeat: "What we have here is the decision to sit down to talk and listen. There will be things which we agree on and there will be others which we do not".

The last opportunity to avoid a nationwide strike was the meeting called by the Minister Zilic with the representatives of the schools in conflict. However, this meeting was not presided by the minister himself but rather by the deputy minister Pilar Romaguera, a situation which was rejected by the students. In addition, the site chosen for the negotiations did not have the capacity for the approximately one hundred student representatives, leading to the secondary students refusing to continue the negotiations unless all school representatives were in one room. The government maintained confidence in continuing negotiations, refusing to consider the situation as a failure and insisting that a small step had been achieved.

[In the ministry,] disorganization reigned. It was pretty clear they were in a hurry, and we can't sit down and talk and even more resolve anything in such circumstances.

— César Valenzuela, ACES spokesman.

After the breakdown of the meeting, the ACES reorganized itself into six regional branches and set up a meeting with senators of both the Concertación and the Alliance for Chile, another sign of the widespread support the movement had won across the political spectrum.

== First national strike ==
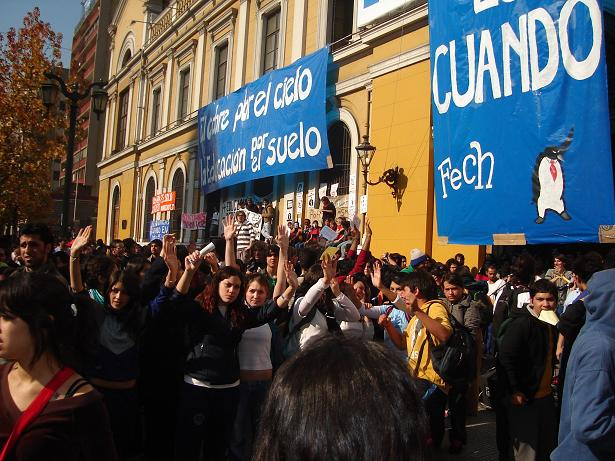
Universidad de Chile students take part in the national strike.

According to ACES, more than 250 schools were paralyzed on May 30, 2006 in a day that was characterized by diverse acts of violence, despite many calls to carry out peaceful demonstrations. The secondary students' call to strike was followed by university students from Universidad de Chile, Universidad Católica and the Universidad de Santiago. The actual number of students on strike was calculated at between 600,000 and one million.

During that morning, President Bachelet, summoned her Political Team — the Ministers of Interior, Finance, Gen. Sec. of Gov. and Gen. Sec. of the Presidency — as well as Minister Zilic to a special meeting in La Moneda. Zilic was sent away to meet directly that afternoon with 23 student leaders at the National Library — a neutral place chosen because of the symbolism of being Chile's main public library.

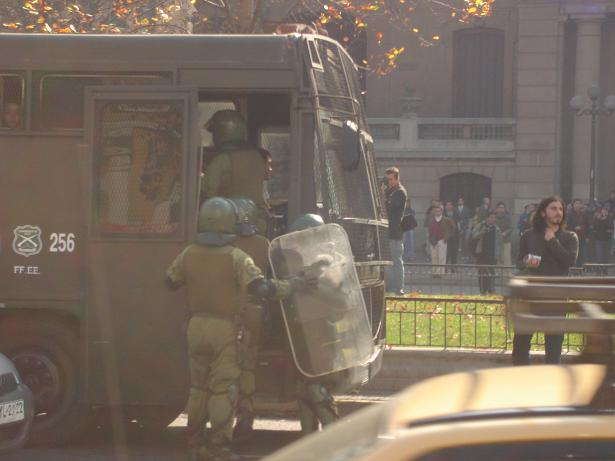
Special Forces of Carabineros de Chile during the national strike

In other areas of the country, a number of demonstrations took place, many being broken up by the police. The main incidents took place in Maipú, Puente Alto, La Florida (all large middle-class districts of Santiago) and in Santiago itself, around the Liceo de Applicación and the University of Chile's head office. The police were widely criticized for firing tear gas at people gathered outside the National Library, waiting for the meeting's resolution.

The press showed images of policemen arresting students and bystanders inside buses and private houses, and even press members being attacked by the police's special forces. Fighting extended throughout the night, with 725 people arrested and 26 injured. The actions of the police were strongly repelled by the public. Some of the strongest reactions came from the press and the President herself:

For our government, a complete freedom of expression and the right to work are fundamental; that is why we have expressed our indignation at the latest events suffered both by journalists and cameramen as well as the students who have been victims of excesses, abuse, condemnable unjustified violence. We want our police to safeguard our security, but we cannot accept the events we witnessed yesterday

— President Michelle Bachelet

Despite having initially backed the police, the regional government and the Interior Minister, Andrés Zaldívar, later severely criticized them as did the Gen. Director of Carabineros who opened an investigation and dismissed ten officers including the Special Forces Prefect and his deputy.

In accordance to my powers, I have ordered the dismissal of the Special Forces Prefect (...) This is a sign that I shall not tolerate, as I said when I assumed this rank, any excesses. I will also defend all procedures adhering to the law, but this is not such a case

— General Alejandro Bernales

Further demonstrations, mostly peaceful, took place in Temuco and Valparaíso, with some riots in Santiago's Plaza Italia, resulting in the arrest on May 31 of 54 people.

== Ongoing negotiations ==
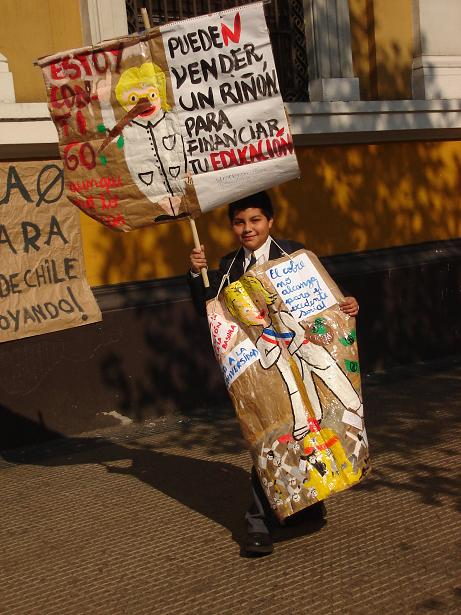
A student satirizing President Bachelet. The top sign shows the President saying "I am with you" (Bachelet's presidential campaign slogan) on the left and "you can sell your kidney to pay for your education" on the right.

On May 31, 2006, ACES members gathered at the Instituto Nacional to analyze the Minister's proposal to exempt the PSU fees for applicants of the population's three lowest-income quintiles. After hours of debate by the hundreds of student leaders, their spokespersons declared their disagreement with the proposal and extended an ultimatum for the following Monday in which they would call for a national general strike, which would also include university students, teachers and workers.

Minister Zilic met with the students again at the Recoleta Domínica, an old church in Santiago. After seven hours of negotiations the students declared that they had not received new offers and that their call for a general strike would continue. Zilic declared the unwillingness of the government to negotiate under such pressure.

In the evening of June 1 president Bachelet addressed the nation by radio and television to announce new non-negotiable measures on education:

- Reorganization of the Ministry of Education, creating a separate regulatory institution to allow for independent supervision by a superintendence.
- Establishment of an Assistant Presidential Council on Education with the task of proposing measures to improve the quality of education.
- Reform of the LOCE and the Constitution, consecrating not only the freedom of education, but also the right to quality education as well as outlawing any unjustified discrimination of students by institutions. This measure is intended to prohibit the present practice of many schools of selecting the best students and blocking or expelling the worst ones.
- Benefits for half a million new students in free lunches and meals in 2006, to be extended to 770,000 by 2007.
- Extensive investment in infrastructure in 520 schools and the replacement of school furniture in 1,200.
- Free Transport Pass (Pase Escolar) for the most needy students, as well as extending use to seven days a week, twenty four hours a day for all students.
- Free PSU for 150,000 students, equivalent to 80% of annual applicants.

Bachelet also referred specifically to the government's incapacity to deliver free transport fare to all students, due to prohibitively high costs (166 billion Chilean pesos annually, US$300 million), which she equated to the funding of 33,000 new social houses, the whole cost of the health system or the creation of seventeen new fully equipped hospitals. Nevertheless, she did announce a 25% rise in family benefits for 2007 that would affect 968,000 beneficiaries. The following day, the economic proposals were detailed by the Finance Minister Andrés Velasco who announced that the total cost of the measures would reach 60 million dollars in 2006 and 138 million dollars per year from 2007 onwards.

The students met to analyze the president's proposal at the Instituto Superior de Comercio (Insuco) on June 2. After a long meeting of more than eight hours, the ACES met with the Education minister. Close to 10 p.m., Minister Zilic announced that he had not been able to reach an agreement with the students, which was later confirmed by the student spokespersons, who further announced another meeting for the following day in the Internado Nacional Barros Arana in order to organize the national strike to take place on June 5.

== Second national strike and movement decay ==
On 3 June 2006, the Coordinating Assembly held a new assembly in the Internado Nacional Barros Arana. However, speculation began to arise concerning a split between the radical and moderate groups of the Assembly, which would explain the resignation of César Valenzuela as spokesperson (he insisted that he had stepped down in order to look after his sick mother). Rumors began to spread that some of the traditional schools of Providencia and Santiago were holding parallel talks with Zilic and that one of the leaders of the Assembly, the communist spokesperson María Jesús Sanhueza, had been removed because of her extremist positions. Nevertheless, the ACES later expressed that all of these rumors were unfounded and part of a government strategy to undermine the movement.

Meanwhile, more than one hundred groups showed their support for the Monday 5 June strike, including a call from the Frente Patriótico Manuel Rodríguez (FPMR) to march in protest, contrary to the wishes of the student leaders who had called for peaceful demonstrations from within the schools. The call from the FPMR provoked much annoyance in the government (motivating the Minister Ricardo Lagos Weber to declare that this act was condemnable); however, the student leaders expressed that the FPMR were within their rights to demonstrate as they wished but that they should assume full responsibility for their actions.

The strike was held on Monday with the additional support of university students, high school teachers, truckers and workers amongst other unions. There was relative calm during the morning apart from a few minor isolated incidents close to the Plaza Italia by an unauthorized march and the burning of tires in the Alameda and Del Sol Highway around 7 a.m. Throughout the country, protest activity was dissimilar: while there were almost no protests in Punta Arenas, more than 140 establishments in the Bío-Bío Region, 58 in Iquique, 9 in Coihaique were occupied as well as the only school on Easter Island. Peaceful marches took place in Osorno, Puerto Montt and La Serena as well as Valparaíso where more than 12,000 people peacefully gathered.

In Santiago, the majority of the occupied schools underwent protests of a cultural nature, within their premises, the largest of which took place in the Instituto Nacional and the nearby University of Chile's main campus. Nevertheless, as the afternoon wore on, disorderly behavior and looting began to take place which led to the mobilization of the Carabineros, who later attacked the people gathered at the Instituto Nacional with tear-gas and water cannons, which according to Germán Westhoff, President of the Student Center, was a "provocation on the part of the Carabineros". In all, more than 240 people were detained during this day of mobilizations.

On June 6, the student assembly wrote a letter to the Minister of Internal Affairs informing him that they saw the creation of a presidential advisory committee — announced by Bachelet in her speech of June 1 to discuss the long-term demands — as a positive step, adding that it should include students, teachers, school administrators, education experts and other social stakeholders and that half of them should be determined by the student assembly. This petition was rejected by the government because it was considered excessive, explaining that the president was free to decide who should be included. On June 7, the president announced a committee of 73 members, which included six seats reserved for high school students.

According to El Mercurio, on 7 June, 50 schools in Santiago and 175 across the country ended the strikes and were ready to return to classes. According to La Tercera, the number of schools ending mobilizations was close to 500.

On June 9 the student assembly agreed to participate in the committee and put an end to strikes and school take-overs.

== See also ==
- 2006 labor protests in France
- 2008 student protests in Chile
- 2011–13 Chilean student protests
- Chilean transition to democracy
- Education in Chile
- 2019 Chilean protests
- Mochilazo
