= César Valenzuela Maass =

Chilean politician (born 1989)

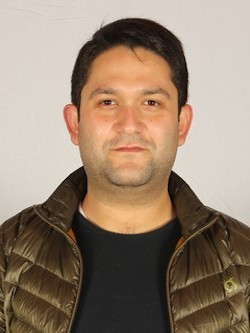

Member of the Chamber of Deputies
- Incumbent
- Assumed office 11 March 2022
- Constituency: 9th District

Member of the Constitutional Convention
- In office 4 July 2021 – 4 July 2022
- Constituency: 9th District

Personal details
- Born: 5 January 1989 (age 37) Recoleta, Chile
- Party: Socialist Party
- Education: Alberto Hurtado University (LL.B)
- Occupation: Constituent
- Profession: Lawyer

César Ignacio Valenzuela Maass (born 5 January 1989) is a Chilean lawyer and politician.

A member of the Socialist Party of Chile, he was elected as a member of the Constitutional Convention in 2021, representing the 9th District of the Metropolitan Region of Santiago.

== Biography ==
Valenzuela was born on 5 January 1989 in Santiago, Chile. He is the son of María Maass Carvacho.

Valenzuela completed his primary education at Escuela Puerto Rico in the commune of Recoleta and his secondary education at Liceo Confederación Suiza in Santiago, graduating in 2006.

He pursued higher education at the Faculty of Law of the Alberto Hurtado University, where he earned a degree in Legal and Social Sciences. He was sworn in as a lawyer before the Supreme Court of Chile on 21 October 2015.

He holds a master’s degree in Prevention, Urban Security, and Criminal Policy.

In his professional practice, he has worked in the private sector, particularly in labor law matters. He also served as Head of the Denuncia Seguro Program of the Undersecretariat for Crime Prevention during the second administration of President Michelle Bachelet.

== Political career ==
Valenzuela is a member of the Socialist Party of Chile and has served as head of the party’s Citizen Security Commission. He is also coordinator of the civic platform Escribela.cl.

In 2006, he acted as a spokesperson for the student movement known as the Penguin Revolution.

In the elections held on 15–16 May 2021, Valenzuela ran as a candidate for the Constitutional Convention representing the 9th District of the Metropolitan Region on behalf of the Socialist Party of Chile, within the Apruebo electoral list. He obtained 9,592 votes, corresponding to 3.03% of the valid votes cast, and was elected as a member of the Convention.

During his tenure as a constitutional delegate, he was one of the coordinators of the Socialist Collective and served as coordinator of the Fundamental Rights Commission and of Subcommittee No. 4 within that commission.

In October 2022, he assumed the position of Head of the Victim Support Program of the Undersecretariat for Crime Prevention.
