= 2008 student protests in Chile =

The 2008 student protests in Chile were a series of protests and other manifestations by citizens of dissatisfaction against the state of education in Chile. The protest were the largest student protest in Chile after the 2006 student protest. Both secondary and university students participated. On April 24 about 500 students were detained in the cities of Santiago, Valparaíso, Concepción, Temuco and Valdivia by police in relation to the protests. On May 28 more than 300 students in Santiago and Antofagasta were detained by police in relation to the protests.

== See also ==
- List of protests in the 21st century
