= District 14 (Chamber of Deputies of Chile) =

Electoral district of the Chamber of Deputies of Chile

- Distrito 14
- Electoral District for the Chamber of Deputies
- Location of District 14 within Chile
- Province: List: Maipo; Melipilla; Talagante
- Region: Santiago
- Population: 981,874 (2017)
- Electorate: 771,724 (2021)
- Area: 5,781 km^{2} (2020)

Current Electoral District
- Created: 2017
- Seats: 6 (2017–present)
- Deputies: List: Juan Antonio Coloma (UDI); Juan Irarrázaval (REP); Raúl Leiva (PS); Camila Musante (Ind); Marisela Santibáñez (Ind); Leonardo Soto (PS)

District 14 (Spanish: Distrito 14) is one of the 28 multi-member electoral districts of the Chamber of Deputies, the lower house of the National Congress, the national legislature of Chile. The district was created by the 2015 electoral reform and came into being at the following general election in 2017. It consists of the provinces of Maipo, Melipilla and Talagante in the region of Santiago. The district currently elects six of the 155 members of the Chamber of Deputies using the open party-list proportional representation electoral system. At the 2021 general election the district had 771,724 registered electors.

== Electoral system ==
District 14 currently elects six of the 155 members of the Chamber of Deputies using the open party-list proportional representation electoral system. Parties may form electoral pacts with each other to pool their votes and increase their chances of winning seats. However, the number of candidates nominated by an electoral pact may not exceed the maximum number of candidates that a single party may nominate. Seats are allocated using the D'Hondt method.

== Election results ==
=== Summary ===
Election	Apruebo Dignidad AD / FA			Green Ecologists PEV			Dignidad Ahora DA			New Social Pact NPS / NM			Democratic Convergence CD			Chile Vamos Podemos / Vamos			Party of the People PDG			Christian Social Front FSC		
Election	Votes	%	Seats	Votes	%	Seats	Votes	%	Seats	Votes	%	Seats	Votes	%	Seats	Votes	%	Seats	Votes	%	Seats	Votes	%	Seats
2021	82,995	25.46%	2	15,009	4.61%	0	16,353	5.02%	0	71,625	21.98%	2				62,716	19.24%	1	25,031	7.68%	0	37,636	11.55%	1
2017	36,661	12.09%	1							89,421	29.48%	2	22,926	7.56%	0	105,579	34.81%	2						

=== Detailed ===
==== 2021 ====
Results of the 2021 general election held on 21 November 2021:

Party		Pact	Party						Pact		
Party		Pact	Votes per province			Total votes	%	Seats	Votes	%	Seats
Party		Pact	Maipo	Meli- pilla	Tala- gante	Total votes	%	Seats	Votes	%	Seats
Communist Party of Chile	PC	Apruebo Dignidad	30,911	11,091	13,930	55,932	17.16%	1	82,995	25.46%	2
Comunes	COM	Apruebo Dignidad	6,053	2,887	3,447	12,387	3.80%	1	82,995	25.46%	2
Social Convergence	CS	Apruebo Dignidad	5,132	1,662	2,250	9,044	2.77%	0	82,995	25.46%	2
Democratic Revolution	RD	Apruebo Dignidad	2,930	1,026	1,676	5,632	1.73%	0	82,995	25.46%	2
Socialist Party of Chile	PS	New Social Pact	19,958	4,978	36,843	61,779	18.96%	2	71,625	21.98%	2
Christian Democratic Party	PDC	New Social Pact	2,986	2,331	1,870	7,187	2.21%	0	71,625	21.98%	2
Radical Party of Chile	PR	New Social Pact	1,500	421	738	2,659	0.82%	0	71,625	21.98%	2
Independent Democratic Union	UDI	Chile Podemos +	18,824	11,352	11,491	41,667	12.78%	1	62,716	19.24%	1
National Renewal	RN	Chile Podemos +	10,914	5,183	4,952	21,049	6.46%	0	62,716	19.24%	1
Republican Party	REP	Christian Social Front	20,426	6,160	11,050	37,636	11.55%	1	37,636	11.55%	1
Party of the People	PDG		13,042	3,955	8,034	25,031	7.68%	0	25,031	7.68%	0
Equality Party	IGUAL	Dignidad Ahora	6,780	1,901	5,239	13,920	4.27%	0	16,353	5.02%	0
Humanist Party	PH	Dignidad Ahora	1,277	406	750	2,433	0.75%	0	16,353	5.02%	0
Green Ecologist Party	PEV		8,523	2,488	3,998	15,009	4.61%	0	15,009	4.61%	0
United Centre	CU	United Independents	4,710	1,439	2,837	8,986	2.76%	0	8,986	2.76%	0
Progressive Party	PRO		2,802	1,064	1,704	5,570	1.71%	0	5,570	1.71%	0
Valid votes			156,768	58,344	110,809	325,921	100.00%	6	325,921	100.00%	6
Blank votes			9,636	4,680	5,061	19,377	5.33%				
Rejected votes – other			9,337	3,638	5,450	18,425	5.07%				
Total polled			175,741	66,662	121,320	363,723	47.13%				
Registered electors			384,175	151,768	235,781	771,724					
Turnout			45.75%	43.92%	51.45%	47.13%					

The following candidates were elected: Juan Antonio Coloma (UDI), 34,868 votes; Juan Irarrázaval (REP), 13,248 votes; Raúl Leiva (PS), 40,946 votes; Camila Musante (COM), 12,387 votes; Marisela Santibáñez (PC), 55,932 votes; and Leonardo Soto (PS), 20,833 votes.

==== 2017 ====
Results of the 2017 general election held on 19 November 2017:

Party		Pact	Party						Pact		
Party		Pact	Votes per province			Total votes	%	Seats	Votes	%	Seats
Party		Pact	Maipo	Meli- pilla	Tala- gante	Total votes	%	Seats	Votes	%	Seats
Independent Democratic Union	UDI	Chile Vamos	33,144	17,200	20,480	70,824	23.35%	2	105,579	32.81%	2
National Renewal	RN	Chile Vamos	21,613	5,118	8,024	34,755	11.46%	0	105,579	32.81%	2
Socialist Party of Chile	PS	Nueva Mayoría	23,496	5,901	40,538	69,935	23.05%	2	89,421	29.48%	2
Party for Democracy	PPD	Nueva Mayoría	6,946	8,312	1,053	16,311	5.38%	0	89,421	29.48%	2
Social Democrat Radical Party	PRSD	Nueva Mayoría	2,126	517	532	3,175	1.05%	0	89,421	29.48%	2
Progressive Party	PRO	All Over Chile	27,765	6,078	10,311	44,154	14.56%	1	44,154	14.56%	1
Democratic Revolution	RD	Broad Front	5,158	3,844	2,571	11,573	3.82%	1	36,661	12.09%	1
Equality Party	IGUAL	Broad Front	4,904	1,522	3,805	10,231	3.37%	0	36,661	12.09%	1
Humanist Party	PH	Broad Front	5,114	1,094	2,332	8,540	2.82%	0	36,661	12.09%	1
Green Ecologist Party	PEV	Broad Front	3,730	904	1,683	6,317	2.08%	0	36,661	12.09%	1
Christian Democratic Party	PDC	Democratic Convergence	8,250	6,860	7,816	22,926	7.56%	0	22,926	7.56%	0
Patriotic Union	UPA		2,432	789	1,382	4,603	1.52%	0	4,603	1.52%	0
Valid votes			144,678	58,139	100,527	303,344	100.00%	6	303,344	100.00%	6
Blank votes			8,016	3,651	4,756	16,423	4.89%				
Rejected votes – other			8,800	2,735	4,759	16,294	4.85%				
Total polled			161,494	64,525	110,042	336,061	47.04%				
Registered electors			358,755	141,112	214,531	714,398					
Turnout			45.02%	45.73%	51.29%	47.04%					

The following candidates were elected: Jaime Bellolio (UDI), 32,044 votes; Juan Antonio Coloma (UDI), 35,779 votes; Renato Garín (RD), 11,573 votes; Raúl Leiva (PS), 44,774 votes; Marisela Santibáñez (PRO), 35,984 votes; and Leonardo Soto (PS), 22,170 votes.
