= Nora Cuevas =

Chilean politician

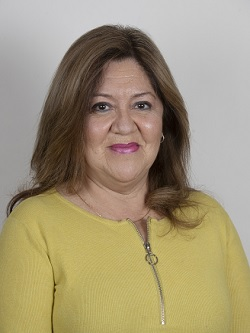

Member of the Chamber of Deputies of Chile
- In office 5 August 2020 – 11 March 2022
- Preceded by: Jaime Bellolio
- Constituency: District 14

Mayor of San Bernardo
- In office 6 December 2008 – 31 July 2020
- Preceded by: Orfelina Bustos Carmona
- Succeeded by: Leonel Cádiz Soto

Councilor of San Bernardo
- In office 6 December 2000 – 6 December 2008

Personal details
- Born: María Nora Cuevas Contreras; 4 January 1959 (age 67) Santiago, Chile
- Party: Independent Democratic Union
- Spouse: Jean-Yves Gautier
- Children: 2
- Education: University of Chile
- Occupation: Public relations officer, politician

María Nora Cuevas Contreras (born 4 January 1959) is a Chilean public relations officer and politician of the Independent Democratic Union (UDI). She has been a member of the Chamber of Deputies for District 14 since August 2020. She previously served as a councilor of San Bernardo from 2000 to 2008, and its mayor from 2008 to 2020.

== Early life and education ==
Nora Cuevas was born in Santiago on 4 January 1959, the daughter of Nora Hilda Contreras Quiroz and Raúl Alfredo Cuevas Palma. Her father was a politician of the Liberal Party (PL), who served as the mayor of San Bernardo from 1963 to 1967, and a councilor there from 1992 to 1996.

She attended the Colegio Inmaculada Concepción de San Bernardo, and later studied pedagogy in biology at the University of Chile. She graduated as a public relations officer from the National School of Public Relations.

She worked at the Central University of Chile for 16 years as its head of wellness.

She is married to Jean-Yves Gautier, and has two children from a previous marriage.

== Political career ==
Cuevas began her political career with an unsuccessful run for councilor of San Bernardo commune in the 1996 municipal elections. She ran again in 2000 and was elected, repeating the result in 2004.

In 2008, she ran for mayor of San Bernardo, and was elected with 41.6% of the votes. She was reelected twice, serving until 2020. As mayor, she promoted the establishment of San Bernardo as a center of Chilean folklore.

During the 2017 general election, Cuevas was a spokesperson for presidential candidate José Antonio Kast, a former member of the UDI, dealing with social, municipal, and housing issues for his campaign.

On 31 July 2020, she was designated by the UDI's board to fill the vacancy left by Jaime Bellolio in the Chamber of Deputies when he was named Minister Secretary General of Government.

Cuevas was sworn in on 5 August, becoming a member of the permanent commissions on human rights and indigenous peoples, family, sports and recreation, and women and gender equity.
