= Carlos Lorca =

Chilean politician (1944-?)

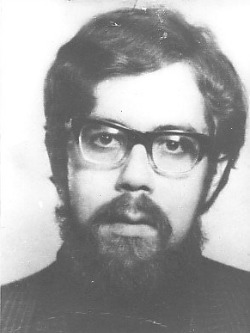
- Born: Carlos Enrique Lorca Tobar; 19 November 1944; Santiago, Chile
- Disappeared: 25 June 1975 (aged 30); Santiago, Chile
- Status: Detenidos Desaparecidos
- Occupations: Psychiatrist; physician; politician
- Political party: Socialist Party of Chile

Deputy of the Republic of Chile for the 22nd Departmental Group for Valdivia, La Unión and Río Bueno
- In office 1973 – 21 September 1973 ^{α}

Carlos Enrique Lorca Tobar (1944 – disappeared 1975), was a Chilean physician, president of the Students' Federation and then deputy for Valdivia province and leader of the Socialist Party of Chile.

== Early life ==
Carlos Enrique Lorca Tobar was born on 19 November 1944 in Santiago to middle class family. Lorca's father was a salesman and technological entrepreneur, and his mother was teacher.

Due to his father's work, Lorca lived in Peru for part of his childhood.

== Biography ==
After the 1973 coup, the Socialist Party as well as the Communist Party were targeted by Chile's secret police. On June 25, 1975, Dr. Lorca, a psychiatrist teaching at the University of Chile, a former member of congress and a member of the political commission of the Socialist party central committee, and Modesta Carolina Wiff Sepulveda, 34, a social worker, were arrested at a laundromat on Calle Maule in Santiago de Chile.

At this laundromat, contacts were made and orders were passed on within the Socialist party. Wiff was functioning as a liaison with the leadership, and was also responsible for carrying out some party tasks. The DINA secret police captured him, along with other opposition leaders, and they were transferred to Villa Grimaldi detention center, from where all trace was lost. DINA agents searched Modesta Carolina Wiff's house a few hours after she was arrested. All the appeals for protection attempted in order to secure their release were in vain. Likewise the criminal process that the relatives initiated as a result of their being apprehended concluded when the criminal court declared itself incompetent and ordered that the trial proceedings be sent to the military justice system. According to independent testimony these two people were arrested and taken to the Villa Grimaldi DINA facility. Since then there has been no further word about either of them.

== Notes ==
^α Mandate 1973–1977 was interrupted by the dissolution of the Chilean National Congress on 21 September 1973.
