= State visit by Fidel Castro to Chile =

1971 visit to Chile by Fidel Castro

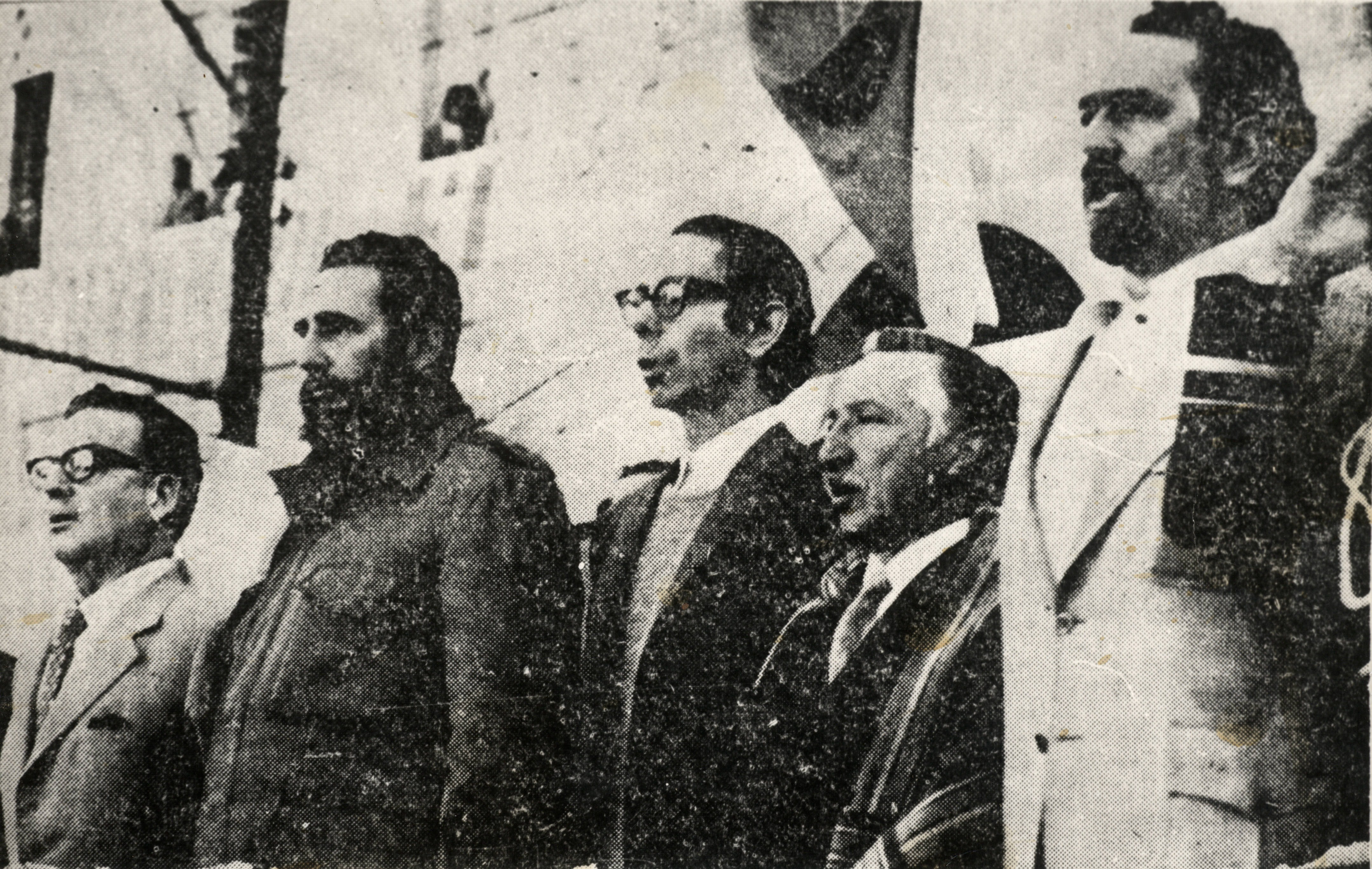
Castro and Allende together with the leaders of the Chilean Socialist Party of Chile and Communist Party of Chile: Carlos Altamirano and Luis Corvalán.

The state visit of the Cuban leader Fidel Castro to Chile in 1971 was a landmark event both for Chilean internal politics and for the foreign relations of Cuba. Castro's visit occurred as Chile was experiencing political convulsion amidst the presidency of Salvador Allende, who had been elected in 1970. For Cuba it was the first state visit of Fidel Castro since he visited Moscow in 1964 and served to break the diplomatic isolation the country was subject to in Latin America. The state visit was unprecedented as Castro stayed 23 days in the country, travelling it from north to south, and commenting on Chilean politics. Upon arrival to each town and city Castro was usually met by crowds of supporters. His visit ended up making Salvador Allende uncomfortable while the Chilean right-wing exploited it to discredit the Unidad Popular government.

== Itinerary ==
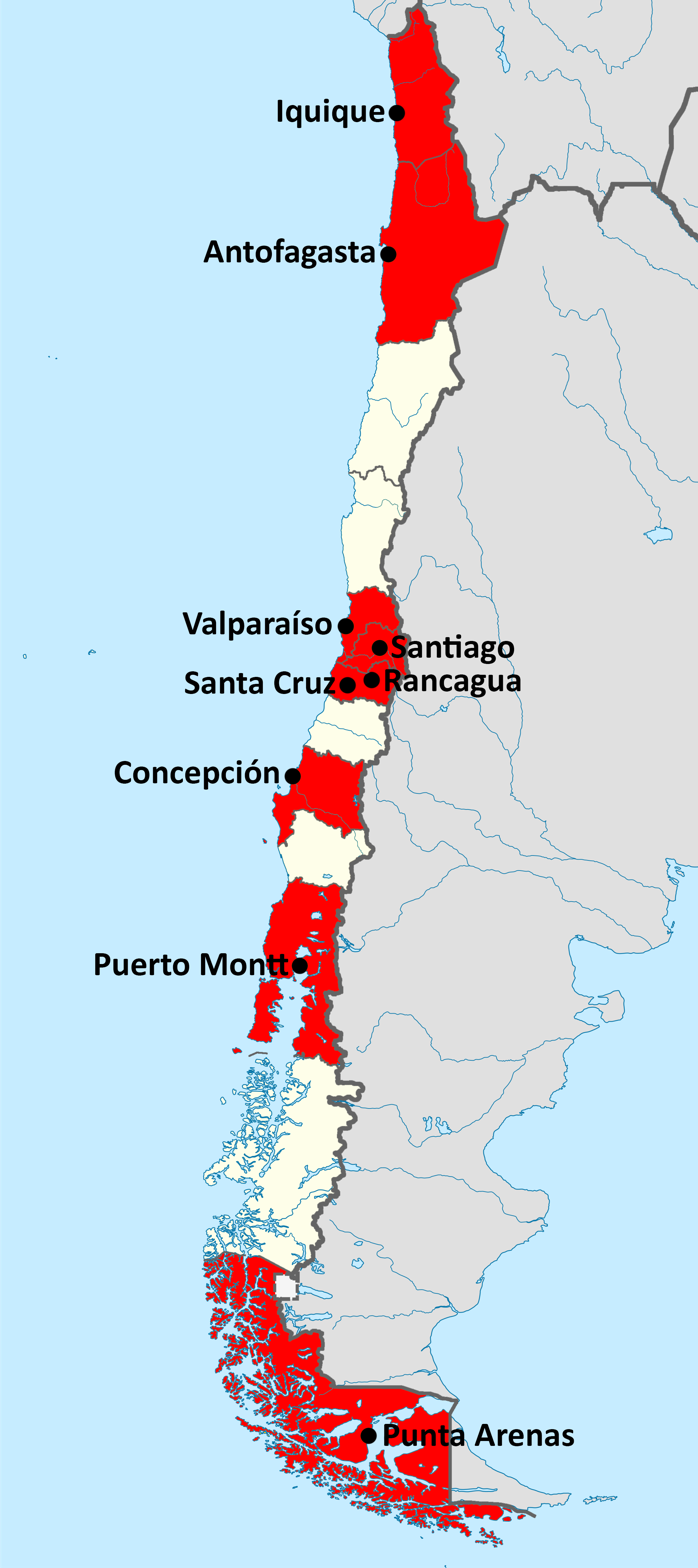
Map with the cities (black dots) and regions (in red) visited by Fidel Castro.

While in Chile Castro was welcomed in the airport by supporters, including communists. The initial security operation around Castro was undertaken jointly by Chileans and Cubans and was unprecedented in Chile. The next day he was received in La Moneda by Salvador Allende. There Castro and Allende talked extensively, and out of protocol, for hours.

The days that followed Castro travelled first to the Norte Grande where he visited Antofagasta, Iquique, the Saltpeter Works of Santa Elena (the cradle of the Chilean labour movement) and the newly nationalized copper mine of Chuquicamata. Castro then went south to Concepción and the coal mining town of Lota. (Note: During much of the 20th century the city of Lota was a stronghold of pro-Soviet communism.) Castro met then again with Allende at Puerto Montt where both embarked on the destroyer Riveros and sailed south, across the Patagonian channels, to arrive at Punta Arenas. Back in Santiago Castro met Cardinal Raúl Silva Henríquez who gave Castro a luxury bible as gift. While in Santiago, Augusto Pinochet, who later headed the military junta that succeeded Allende, accompanied Fidel Castro at various stops. At Valparaíso Castro met Allende again and Castro's departure was announced. The trade union CUT organized a farewell at Estadio Nacional, though the farewell fell short of expectations, as the stadium was half-empty. Even Castro was reported to be disappointed.

== Meetings and opinions of Castro ==
During his visit, Castro talked extensively with university students, workers and shopkeepers. Castro was noted for his warmth and closeness to ordinary Chilean people during his visit. The most famous of Castro's encounters with students occurred in the University of Concepción on November 18. At the meeting the second question to be asked of Castro was from Martín Zilic of Democracia Cristiana Universitaria. Zilic asked about the role of Christians in the Cuban Revolution. When it was the turn of a representative of the right-wing Juventud del Partido Nacional to talk to Castro other attendees booed him. Castro interceded, rhetorically asking the students whether they did not want him to be ever contradicted.

Castro praised various aspects of Chile during his visit including its landscapes and political culture which he held to be superior to that of pre-revolutionary Cuba. Castro considered that Chile was amidst a revolutionary process, acknowledging the difficulties that existed in Chile and not in Cuba for that purpose, but praising the Chilean nationalization of copper. During his visit Castro was seen enjoying a number of typical Chilean foods including pisco, chirimoya, and empanadas. On one occasion Castro dressed as a huaso with a poncho and chupalla in Santa Cruz.

The most controversial aspects of his visit was his opinions on Chilean internal matters as he in turn criticized Chilean landowners, the press, the opposition to Allende and "the oligarchy".

Despite the cordial feelings he expressed during his visit, Castro was reportedly critical of Allende's policies. “Marxism is a revolution of production," Castro is said to have stated, whereas "Allende's was a revolution of consumption."
