= San Juan de Dios Hospital (Santiago) =

Coordinates: 33.442°S 70.679°W

Hospital San Juan de Dios
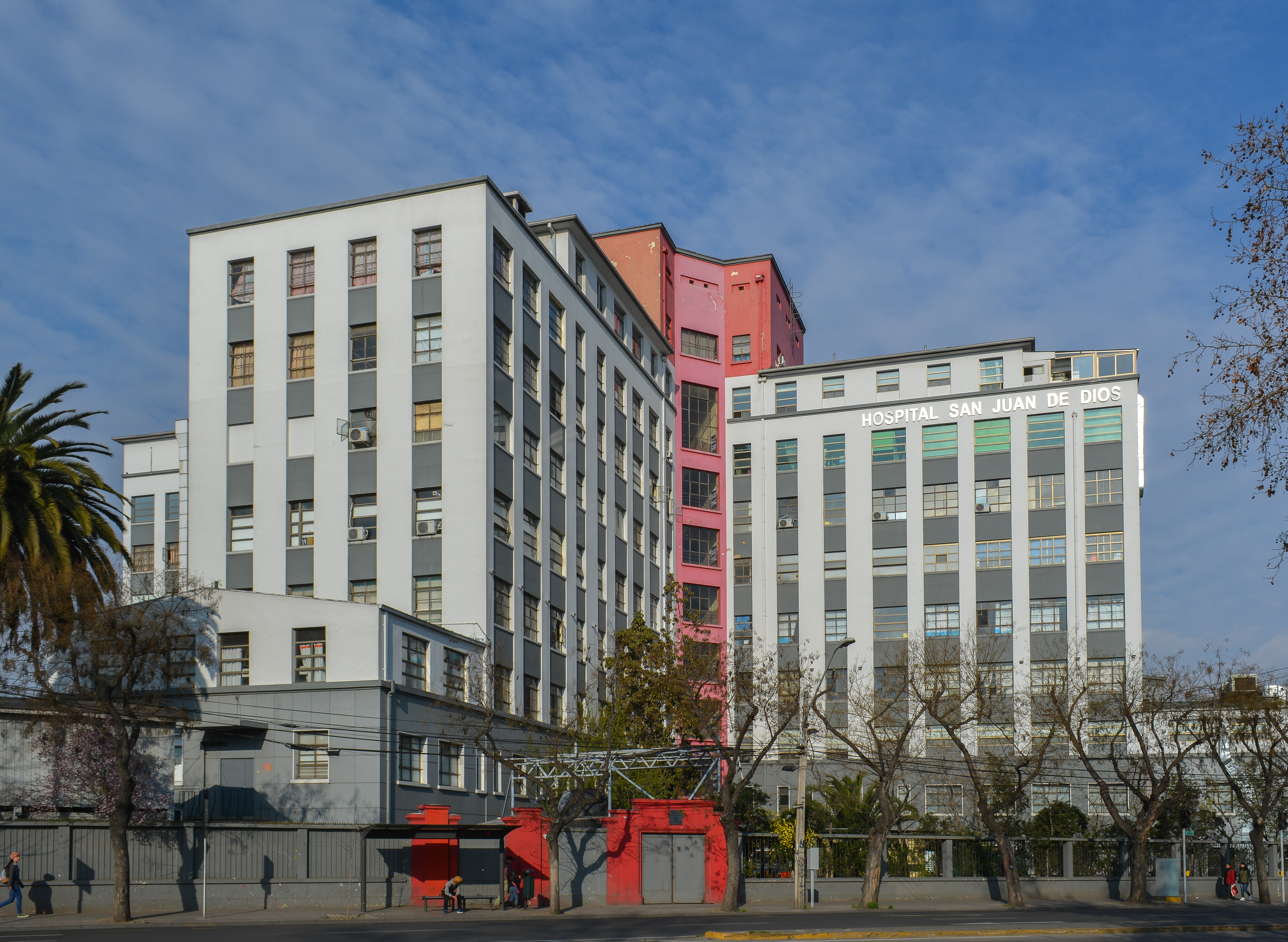

Geography
- Location: Santiago, Chile

Services
- Beds: 600

Links
- Website: www.hospitalsanjuandedios.cl

The San Juan de Dios Hospital is a public hospital located in Santiago, Chile. It is part of the public healthcare network in the western portion of Santiago Metropolitan Region, providing health services to residents of Santiago, Quinta Normal, Lo Prado, Renca, Cerro Navia and Pudahuel within the borders of the city. It also provide healthcare to patients from the Melipilla Province, including Melipilla, Alhué, Curacaví, María Pinto and San Pedro; as well as the Talagante Province, which includes the municipalities of Isla de Maipo, El Monte, Padre Hurtado, Peñaflor and Talagante. Established in 1552, it is the oldest hospital institution in Chile.

The hospital complex consists of four buildings: the main tower, the Centro Diagnóstico y Terapéutico (CDT) Prof. Dr. Rodolfo Armas Cruz, the Ex Posta 3 and the Centro de Diabetes y Nutrición Helen Lee Lassen.

== History ==
The San Juan de Dios Hospital was created shortly after the foundation of Santiago and is considered to be the first hospital in the city and the country. The exact date of its foundation is still debatable, but it is believed it was opened on October 3, 1552, at the end of the government of Pedro de Valdivia, under the name Hospital de Nuestra Señora del Socorro. Its original location was on the south side of the Alameda, just across the street from the Iglesia San Francisco.

In 1617 the hospital went on to be administered by the Brothers Hospitallers of Saint John of God. From the colonial era to the present, the hospital has been an important part of the history of the city.

Since 1863 the hospital is considered as a teaching hospital.

Following the demolition of the old building in 1944, the San Juan de Dios Hospital was relocated, rebuilt and reopened on May 1, 1954. The hospital is currently located on Matucana Avenue, facing Quinta Normal Park.
