= Cabimbao =

- Village
- Cabimbao
- Interactive map of Cabimbao
- Country: Chile
- Region: Metropolitana de Santiago
- Province: Melipilla
- Commune: San Pedro

Cabimbao is a Chilean village located in the province of Melipilla, Metropolitana de Santiago Region, Chile.
