= John of God (disambiguation) =

John of God (1495–1550) was a Portuguese Catholic saint.

John of God, St John of God, or John of God's may also refer to

- João Teixeira de Faria (born 1942), Brazilian self-proclaimed medium and psychic surgeon
- Brothers Hospitallers of Saint John of God, Catholic religious institute addressing poverty and mental illness
- St John of God Hospital (disambiguation)

== See also ==
- João de Deus (disambiguation), Portuguese for "John of God"
- , Spanish for "John of God"
