= Curacaví =

- City and Commune
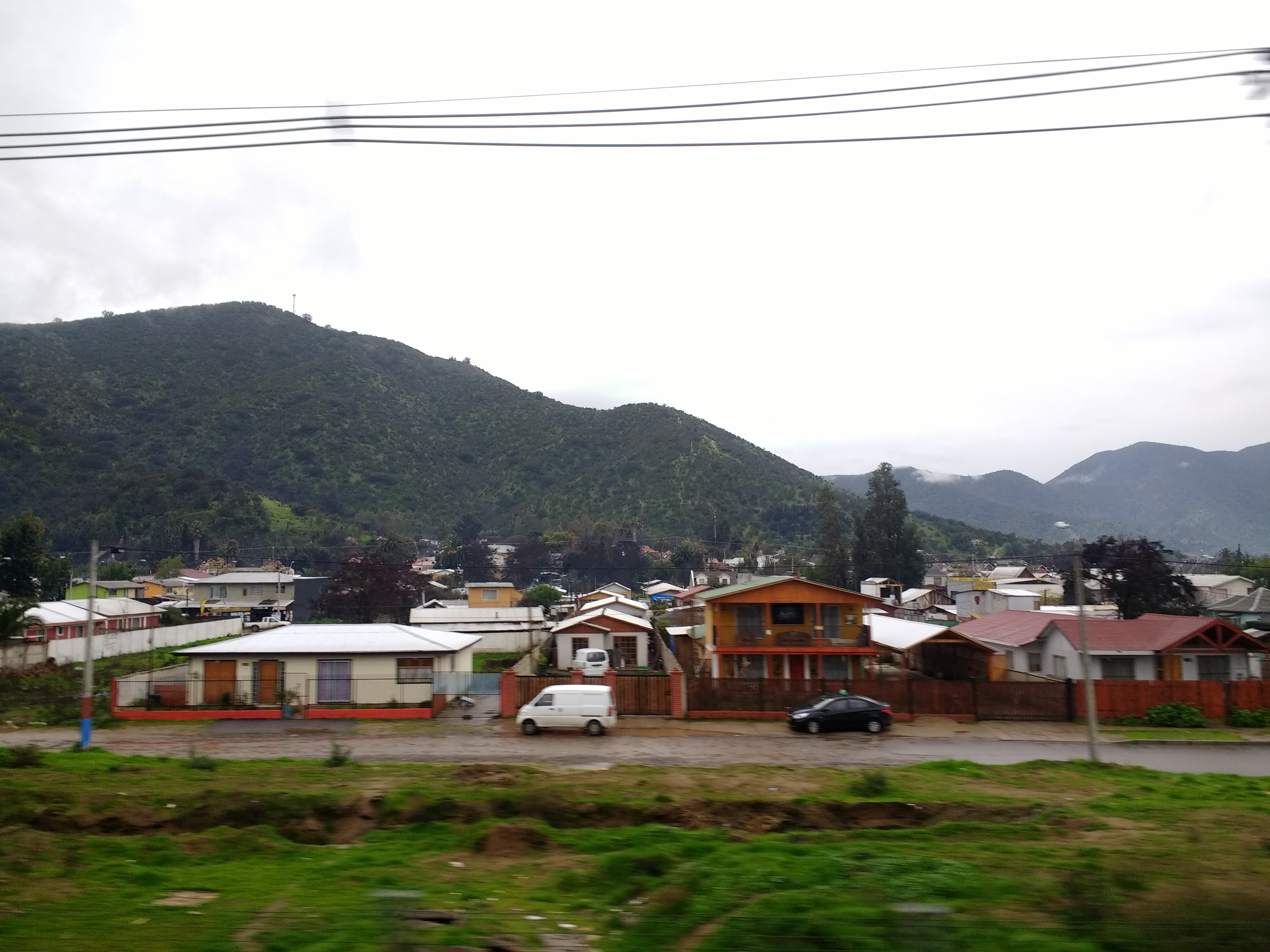

- Location of the Curacaví commune in the Santiago Metropolitan Region Location in Chile
- Coordinates: 33°24′S 71°09′W
- Country: Chile
- Region: Santiago Metropolitan Region
- Province: Melipilla Province

Government
  - Type: Municipality
  - Alcalde: Juan Pablo Barros Basso (IND)

Area
  - Total: 693.2 km^{2} (267.6 sq mi)

Population (2017 Census)
  - Total: 34,337
  - Density: 49.53/km^{2} (128.3/sq mi)
  - Urban: 20,360
  - Rural: 12,219

Sex
  - Men: 18,620
  - Women: 18,859
- Time zone: UTC-4 (CLT)
  - Summer (DST): UTC-3 (CLST)
- Area code: 56 +

Curacaví (Spanish pronunciation: [ku.ɾa.ka.ˈβi]) is a city and commune in the Melipilla Province of central Chile's Santiago Metropolitan Region. Its climate is temperate Mediterranean with a long dry season, experiencing high temperatures in summer and low temperatures in winter. Curacaví is located on the Ruta 68 between the coastal conurbation of Viña del Mar and Valparaíso and Santiago which has proved a popular home for expats working in Santiago.

Curacaví is a commune situated between the hills of the coastal mountain range in central Chile, located in the Metropolitan Region of Santiago, specifically in Melipilla Province, with an area of 693 km^{2} and borders the following municipalities: Casablanca, Quilpué, Lampa, Pudahuel, Maipú, Padre Hurtado, Melipilla, and Maria Pinto.

Curacaví is integrated along with the communes of Talagante, Melipilla, Peñaflor, Isla de Maipo, Maria Pinto, El Monte, San Pedro and Alhué in the number 31 Electoral District and also belongs to the 7th Chilean Senate District (Santiago west). The commune covers five districts: Curacaví, Bustamante, Lo Prado, Zapata and Caren.

== Rapid Expansion ==
Curacaví is now home to various exclusive gated communities called condominios. These large luxury developments range from 500 hectares upwards with each individual property starting at around 1 hectare. The development of the condominios began in the 1990s but has accelerated dramatically in recent years. The area is therefore home to increasing numbers of wealthy Santiago commuters who are both Chilean and foreign. The momentum is largely due to fast transport links and a better quality of life in the face of Santiago's increasing pollution problems. Fast commuting times are now offered through the Ruta 68 and the Lo Prado tunnel which offers journey times of 35 minutes to Santiago.

== Geography and climate ==
Immersed among the hills of the coastal mountain range, Curacaví occupies an area of 693.2 km^{2} (268 sq mi) and borders the following communes: Casablanca, Quilpué, Lampa, Pudahuel, Maipú, Padre Hurtado, Melipilla, and María Pinto. The climate is mild Mediterranean with a long dry season with high temperatures in the summer and low temperatures in the winter.

Climate data for Curacaví
Month	Jan	Feb	Mar	Apr	May	Jun	Jul	Aug	Sep	Oct	Nov	Dec	Year
Mean daily maximum °C (°F)	29.0 (84.2)	28.4 (83.1)	26.3 (79.3)	22.8 (73.0)	18.9 (66.0)	15.8 (60.4)	16.0 (60.8)	17.3 (63.1)	19.6 (67.3)	22.4 (72.3)	25.6 (78.1)	27.9 (82.2)	22.5 (72.5)
Daily mean °C (°F)	21.5 (70.7)	21.0 (69.8)	19.0 (66.2)	16.0 (60.8)	13.4 (56.1)	11.0 (51.8)	10.9 (51.6)	11.8 (53.2)	13.8 (56.8)	16.1 (61.0)	18.6 (65.5)	20.6 (69.1)	16.1 (61.1)
Mean daily minimum °C (°F)	14.1 (57.4)	13.7 (56.7)	11.8 (53.2)	9.3 (48.7)	8.0 (46.4)	6.3 (43.3)	5.8 (42.4)	6.3 (43.3)	8.0 (46.4)	9.8 (49.6)	11.7 (53.1)	13.3 (55.9)	9.8 (49.7)
Average precipitation mm (inches)	1 (0.0)	7 (0.3)	5 (0.2)	12 (0.5)	78 (3.1)	111 (4.4)	84 (3.3)	72 (2.8)	22 (0.9)	15 (0.6)	7 (0.3)	3 (0.1)	417 (16.5)
Source: Climate-Data.org

== Demographics ==
According to the 2002 census of the National Statistics Institute, Curacaví spans an area of 693.2 km^{2} (268 sq mi) and has 24,298 inhabitants (12,351 men and 11,947 women). Of these, 15,645 (64.4%) lived in urban areas and 8,653 (35.6%) in rural areas. The population grew by 27.5% (5,245 persons) between the 1992 and 2002 censuses. There is a fast growing expat community in Curacaví

=== Notable people ===
- Juan Williams Rebolledo – Commander-in-chief of the Chilean Navy at the beginning of the War of the Pacific
- Rosamel del Valle – Avant-garde poet

== Administration ==
As a commune, Curacaví is a third-level administrative division of Chile administered by a municipal council, headed by an alcalde who is directly elected every four years. The 2012–2016 alcalde is Juan Pablo Barros Basso (IND), and the council members are:

- Lidia Araos Henriquez (UDI)
- Cristian Galdames Santibañez (PS)
- Paul Alvarado Muñoz (PDC)
- Marco Antonio Guzmán Márquez (UDI)
- Sandra Ponce Baeza (RN)
- Francisco Carrasco González (PC)

Within the electoral divisions of Chile, Curacaví is represented in the Chamber of Deputies by Denise Pascal (PS) and Gonzalo Uriarte (UDI) as part of the 31st electoral district, (together with Talagante, Peñaflor, El Monte, Isla de Maipo, Melipilla, María Pinto, Alhué, San Pedro and Padre Hurtado). The commune is represented in the Senate by Guido Girardi Lavín (PPD) and Jovino Novoa Vásquez (UDI) as part of the 7th senatorial constituency (Santiago-West).

== Airport ==
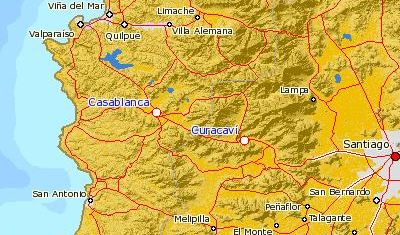

Curacavi is home to a small airport situated by the motorway Ruta 68.

== Chicha ==
Curacaví is famous in Chile for its chicha production . There is a popular Chilean cueca titled "Chicha de Curacaví".

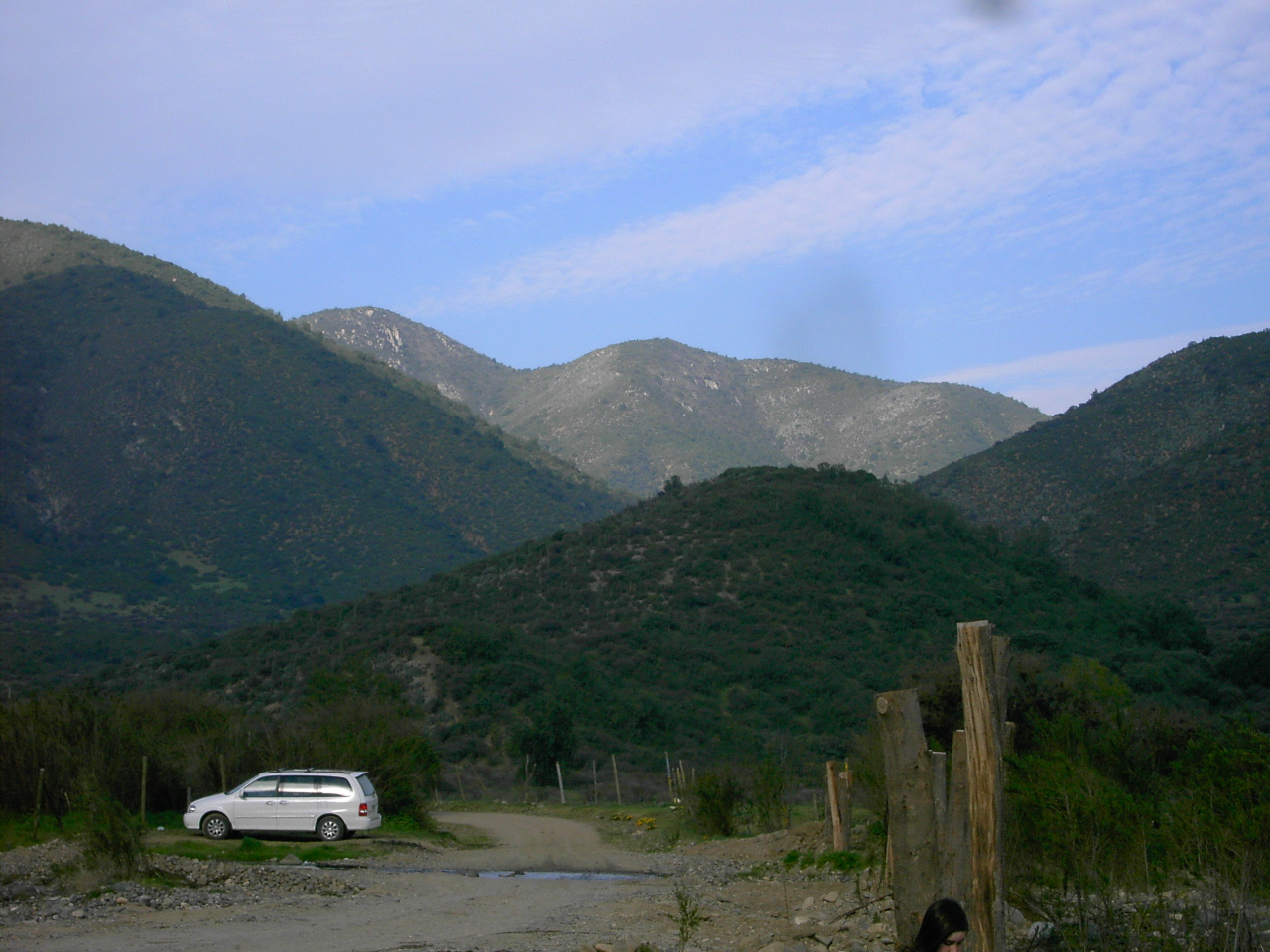

== Road from Santiago to Valparaiso ==
Curacaví is on the most-used old horse trail between Valparaiso and Santiago which had been formed during the Inca period. Since 1553 it was called the royal highway. The old road crossed Casablanca, the Zapata road and Curacaví finally entering Santiago on the road of San Pablo. The original royal highway was made between the years 1792 and 1797 however Ambrosio O'Higgins changed the old road by the current Lo Prado route.

=== Mercedes Canal ===
The Mercedes Canal (Spanish: Canal de las Mercedes), which irrigates the whole valley of Curacavi was built by Jose Manuel Balmaceda before becoming president. The canal was started in 1854 and finished 30 years later with a total length of 120 km and with a flow rate 10 m³/s.

== Parish School ==
The first Parish School was built by the priest Don Eduardo Miles in 1885 which is still working and has done so almost without interruption educating much of the local population.

== Gallery ==
Photos of Curacaví

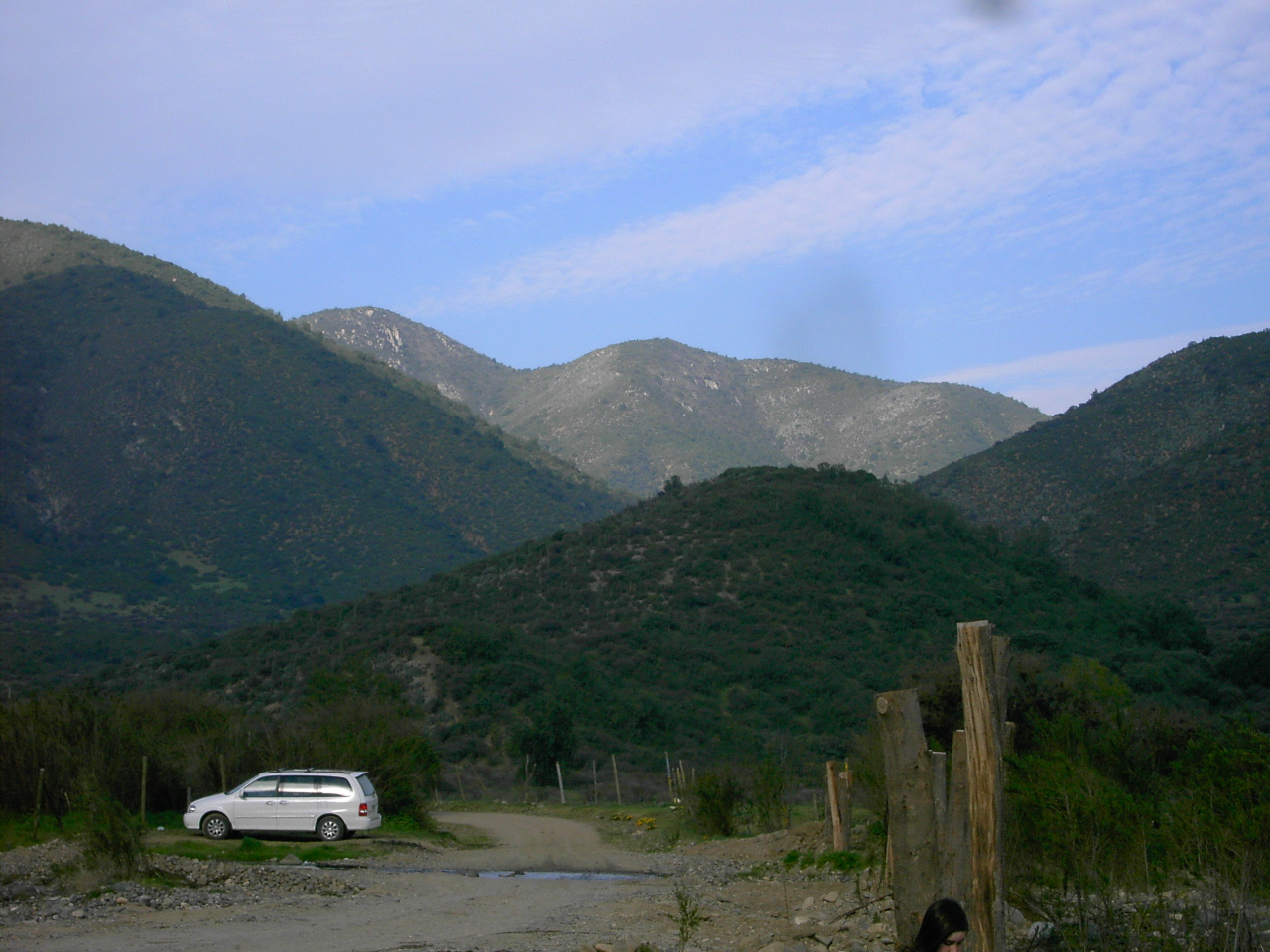
Ford of the Puangue River at Alhué near Curacaví.

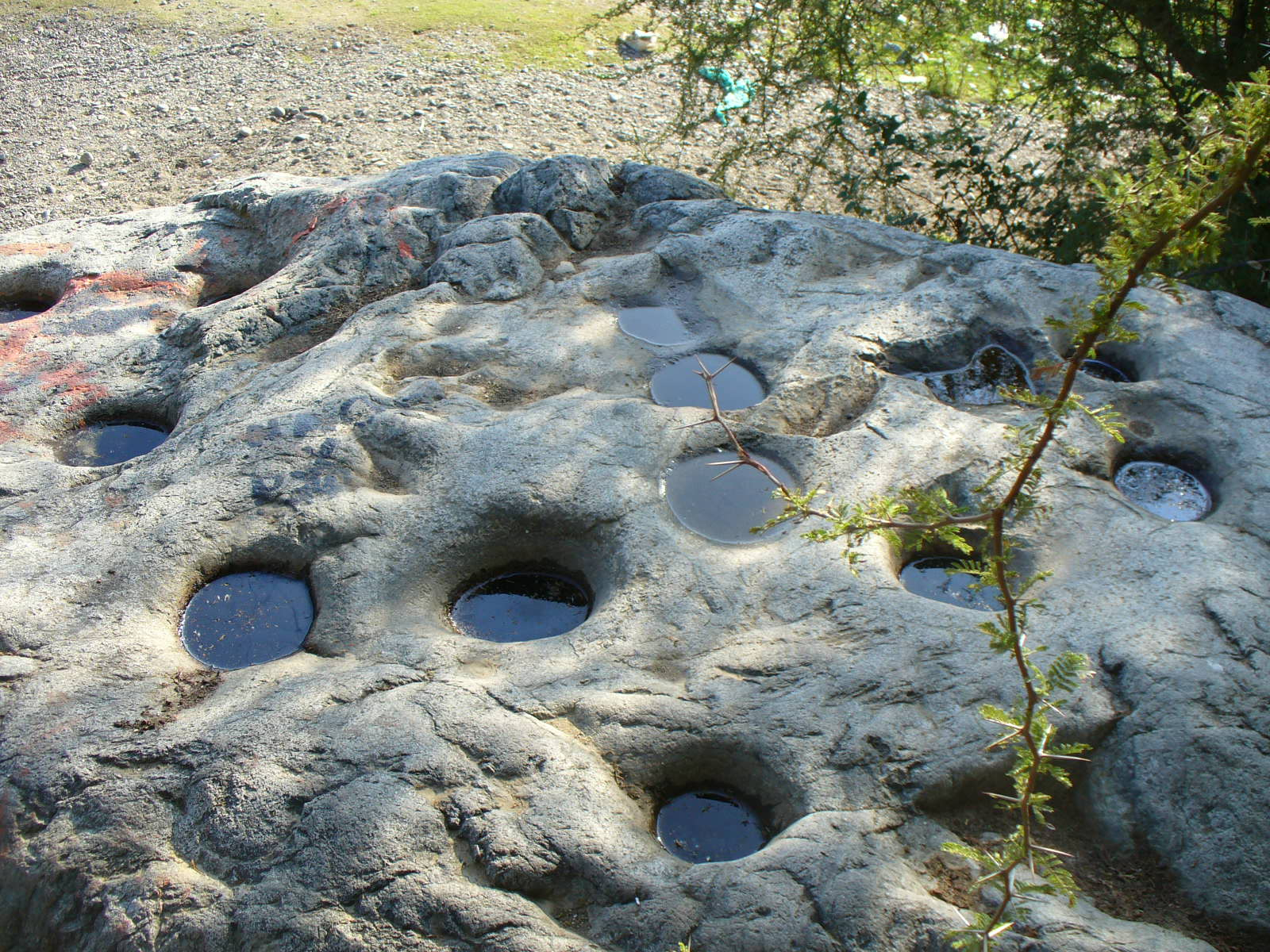
"Tacitas" (cupules) on a boulder at the banks of the Puangue River.

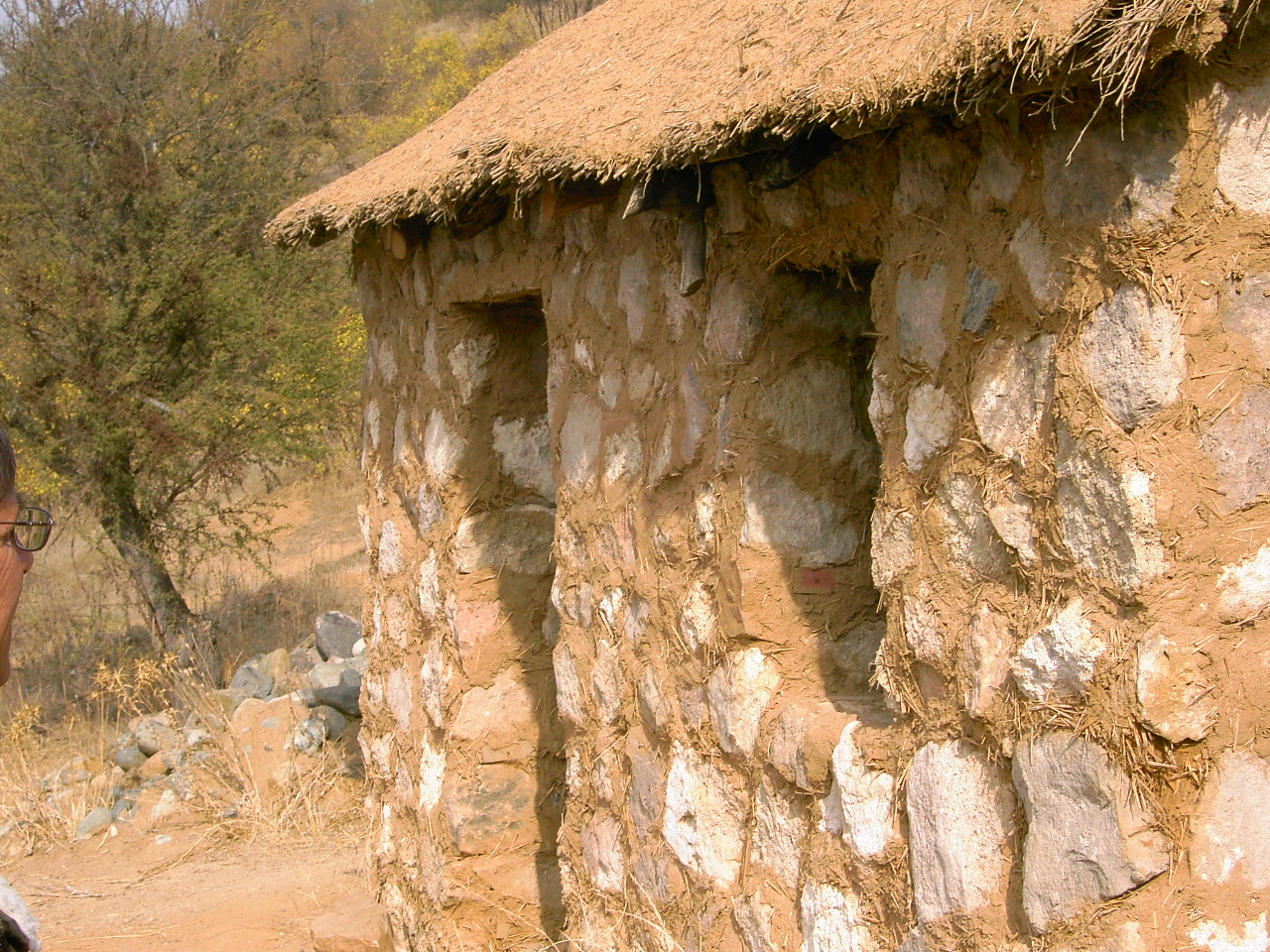
A house at the museum Museo de la Vivienda Tradicional Rural Unifamiliar Chilena.
