= Hospital San Juan de Dios =

Hospital San Juan de Dios may refer to:

- Hospital San Juan de Dios, Bogota, Colombia
- San Juan de Dios Hospital (Santiago), Chile
- A former hospital in Cúcuta, Colombia, now a library
- Hospital San Juan de Dios, Pamplona, Colombia
- Hospital San Juan de Dios (San José), San José, Costa Rica

== See also ==
- San Juan de Dios Hospital (Granada)
- San Juan De Dios Hospital (Philippines)
- St John of God Hospital (disambiguation)
- San Juan de Dios Hospital (Peru)
