= Pomaire =

Town in Santiago Metropolitan Region, Chile

Coordinates: 33°39′S 71°10′W

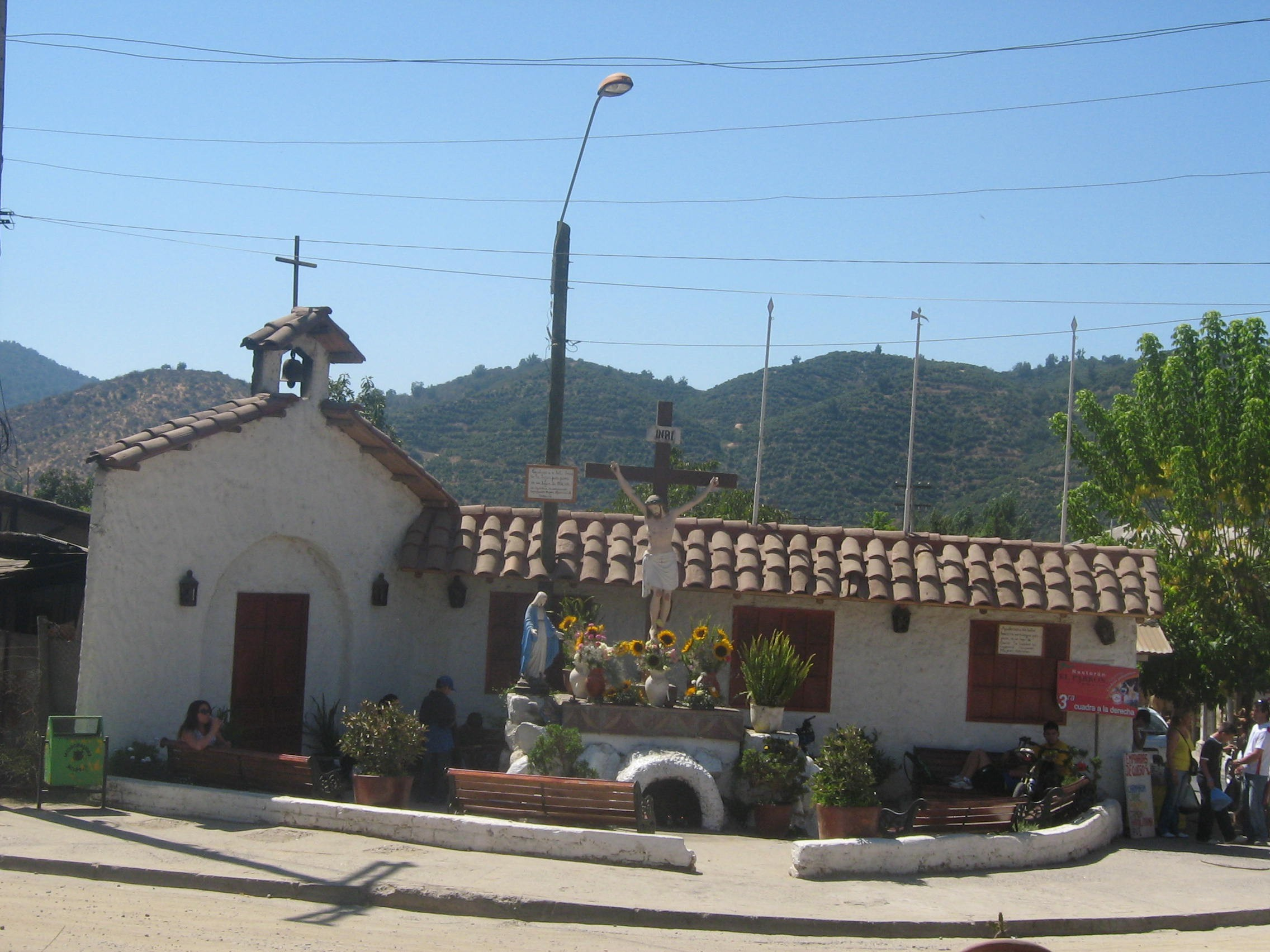

Pomaire is a town in the commune of Melipilla in Melipilla Province, Santiago Metropolitan Region, Chile. Natural clay abundant in the hills surrounding the town bolstered a thriving pottery industry in the community.

In the village there is a tradition of giving Chanchitos, little pig statuettes to friends and family members to bring good luck.

== See also ==
- List of towns in Chile
