= Alhué =

- Town and Commune
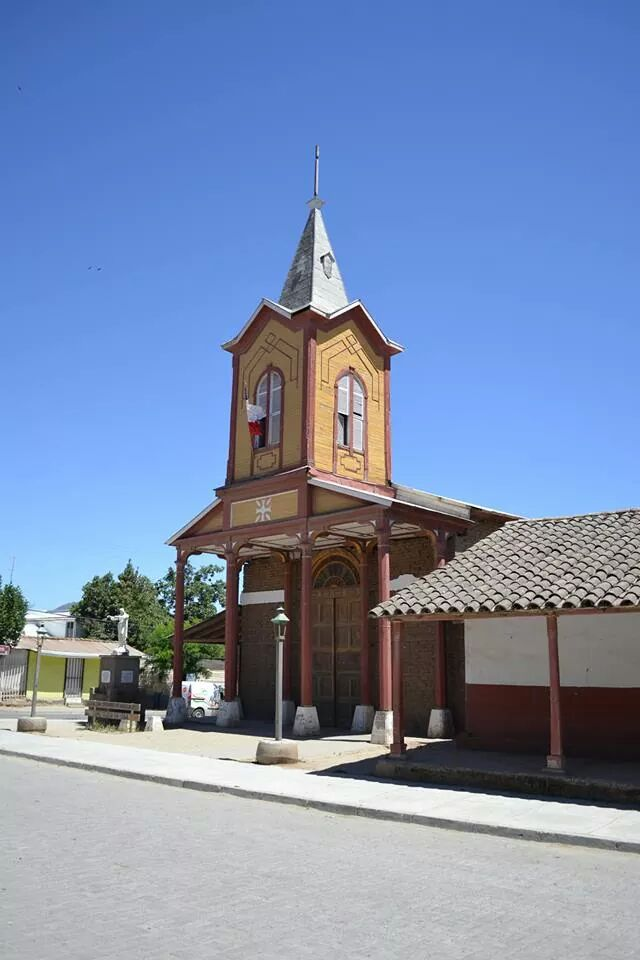
- Church in Villa Alhue

- Location of the Alhué commune in the Santiago Metropolitan Region Location in Chile
- Coordinates: 34°01′40″S 71°06′59″W
- Country: Chile
- Region: Santiago Metro.
- Province: Melipilla

Government
  - Type: Municipality
  - Alcalde: Roberto Torres Huerta (Ind.)

Area
  - Total: 845.2 km^{2} (326.3 sq mi)

Population (2002 Census)
  - Total: 4,435
  - Density: 5.247/km^{2} (13.59/sq mi)
  - Urban: 2,593
  - Rural: 1,842

Sex
  - Men: 2,343
  - Women: 2,092
- Time zone: UTC-4 (CLT)
  - Summer (DST): UTC-3 (CLST)
- Website: Municipality of Alhué

Alhué (Spanish pronunciation: [alˈwe]) is a Chilean town and commune located in Melipilla Province, Santiago Metropolitan Region.

== Demographics ==
According to the 2002 census of the National Statistics Institute, Alhué spans an area of 845.2 km^{2} (326 sq mi) and has 4,435 inhabitants (2,343 men and 2,092 women). Of these, 2,593 (58.5%) lived in urban areas and 1,842 (41.5%) in rural areas. The population grew by 10.5% (422 persons) between the 1992 and 2002 censuses.

== Administration ==
As a commune, Alhué is a third-level administrative division of Chile administered by a municipal council, headed by an alcalde who is directly elected every four years. The 2012-2016 alcalde is Roberto Torres Huerta (Ind.). The communal council has the following members:

- Danilo Salazar Morales (PC)
- Hugo Lazo Segovia (PC)
- Roberto Aravena Miranda (PDC)
- Mario Huerta Mora (PH)
- Luis Núñez Pérez (PH)
- Nancy Cofré Quiroz (RN)

Within the electoral divisions of Chile, Alhué is represented in the Chamber of Deputies by Denise Pascal (PS) and Gonzalo Uriarte (UDI) as part of the 31st electoral district, (together with Talagante, Peñaflor, El Monte, Isla de Maipo, Melipilla, María Pinto, Curacaví, San Pedro and Padre Hurtado). The commune is represented in the Senate by Guido Girardi Lavín (PPD) and Jovino Novoa Vásquez (UDI) as part of the 7th senatorial constituency (Santiago-West).
