= El Monte, Chile =

El Monte
- City and Commune
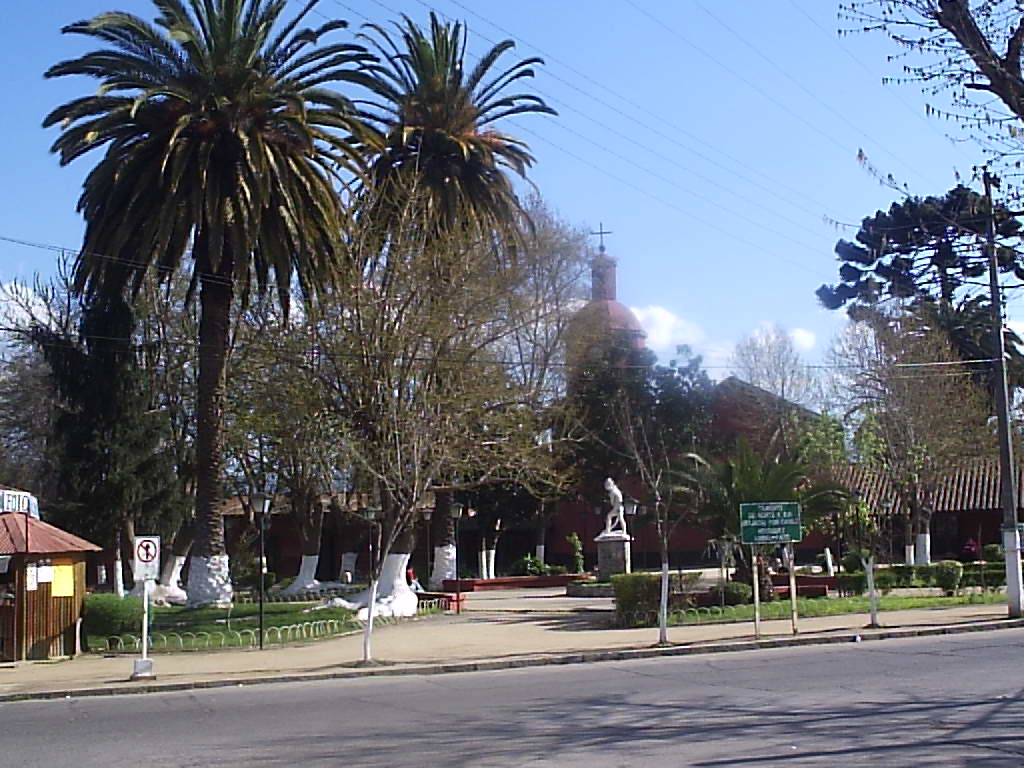
- Plaza in El Monte

- Flag Location in the El Monte commune in the Santiago Metropolitan Region Location in Chile
- Coordinates (city): 33°41′S 71°1′W
- Country: Chile
- Region: Santiago
- Province: Talagante

Government
  - Type: Municipality
  - Alcalde: Francisco Gómez Ramírez (PS)

Area
  - Total: 118.1 km^{2} (45.6 sq mi)
  - Rank: 3
- Elevation: 239 m (784 ft)

Population (2002 Census)
  - Total: 26,459
  - Rank: 4
  - Density: 224.0/km^{2} (580.3/sq mi)
  - Urban: 22,284
  - Rural: 4,175

Sex
  - Men: 13,334
  - Women: 13,125
- Time zone: UTC-4 (CLT)
  - Summer (DST): UTC-3 (CLST)
- Area code: 56 + 53
- Website: Municipality de El Monte

El Monte is a Chilean city and commune in Talagante Province, Santiago Metropolitan Region. As of 2007, it had a population of 29,568.

== Geography ==
El Monte can be found on the north bank of the Mapocho River in the Chilean Central Valley approximately 55 km (34 mi) southwest of the metropolitan area of Santiago. The commune spans an area of 118.1 km^{2} (46 sq mi).

== Demographics ==
According to 2002 census of the National Statistics Institute, El Monte spans an area of 118.1 km^{2} (46 sq mi) and had 26,459 inhabitants (13,334 men and 13,125 women). Of these, 22,284 (84.2%) lived in urban areas and 4,175 (15.8%) in rural areas. The population grew by 20.9% (4,577 persons) between the 1992 and 2002 censuses.

== Administration ==
As a commune, El Monte is a third-level administrative division of Chile administered by a municipal council, headed by an alcalde who is directly elected every four years. The 2012–2016 alcalde is Francisco Gómez Ramírez (PS). The communal council has the following members:

- Juan Pablo Gómez Ramírez (PDC)
- Rossana Sanhueza Muñoz (IND)
- Mario Varela Montero (UDI)
- Guisela Rosales Reyes (IND)
- Andres Maass Reyes (RN)
- Rolando Ortega Valdivia (PDC)

Within the electoral divisions of Chile, El Monte is represented in the Chamber of Deputies by Denise Pascal (PS) and Gonzalo Uriarte (UDI) as part of the 31st electoral district, (together with Talagante, Peñaflor, Isla de Maipo, Melipilla, María Pinto, Curacaví, Alhué, San Pedro and Padre Hurtado). The commune is represented in the Senate by Guido Girardi Lavín (PPD) and Jovino Novoa Vásquez (UDI) as part of the 7th senatorial constituency (Santiago-West).
