= Peñaflor, Chile =

Peñaflor
- City and Commune
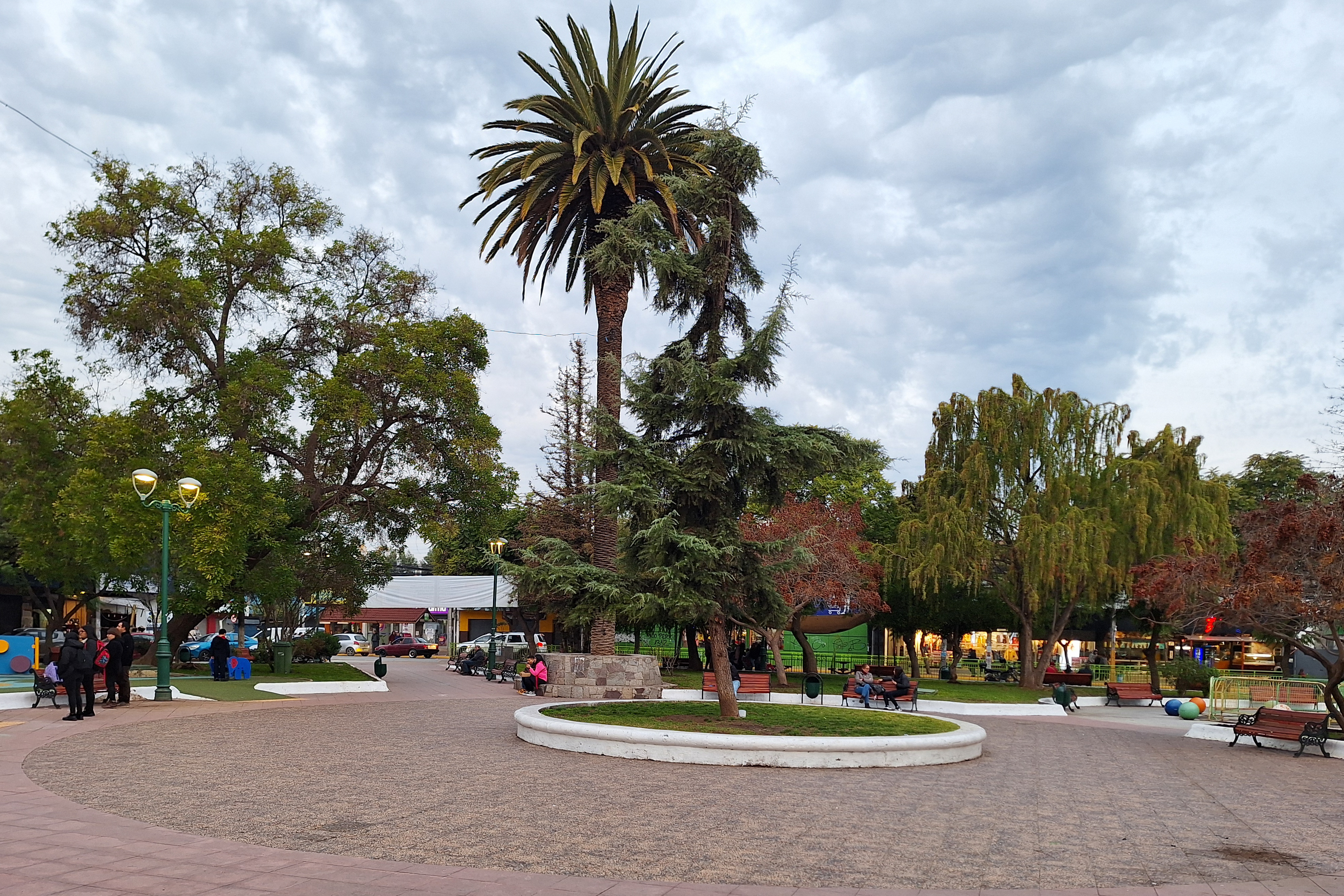
- Plaza de Peñaflor

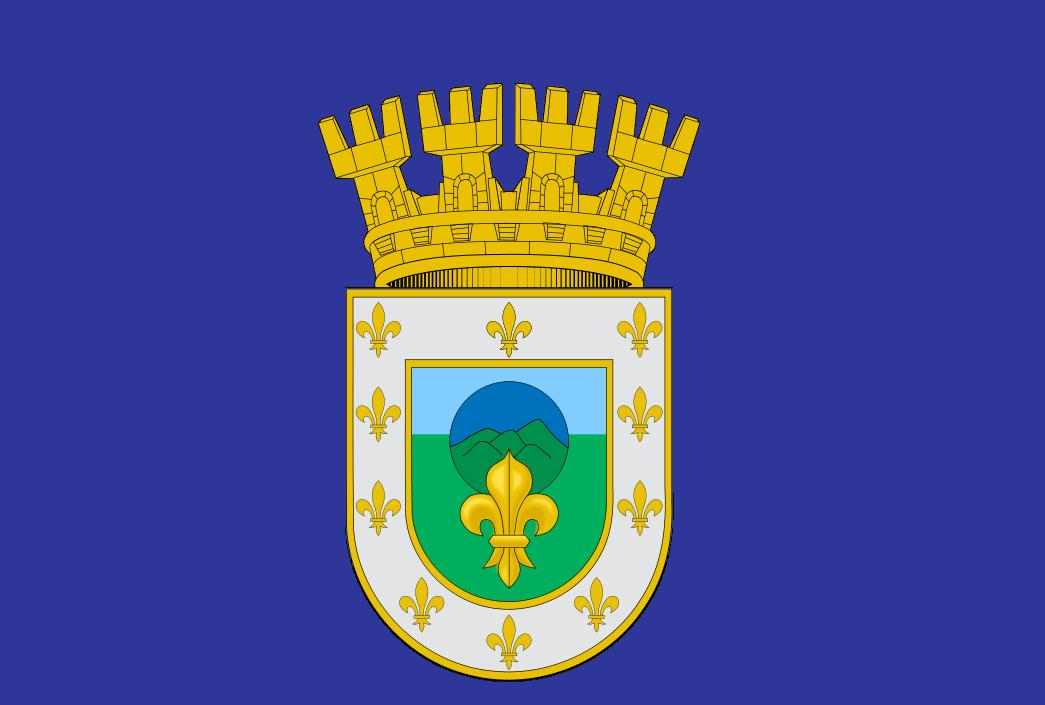
- Flag Coat of arms Location of the Peñaflor commune in the Santiago Metropolitan Region Location in Chile
- Coordinates: 33°37′S 70°55′W
- Country: Chile
- Region: Santiago Metro.
- Province: Talagante

Government
  - Type: Municipality
  - Alcalde: Rodrigo Cornejo Inostroza (UDI)

Area
  - Total: 69.2 km^{2} (26.7 sq mi)
  - Rank: 5
- Elevation: 342 m (1,122 ft)

Population (2002 Census)
  - Total: 66,619
  - Rank: 1
  - Density: 963/km^{2} (2,490/sq mi)
  - Urban: 63,209
  - Rural: 3,410

Sex
  - Men: 32,671
  - Women: 33,948
- Time zone: UTC-4:00 (CLT)
  - Summer (DST): UTC-3:00 (CLST)
- Area code: 56 + 53
- Website: www.penaflor.cl (in Spanish)

Peñaflor (Spanish pronunciation: [peɲaˈfloɾ]) is a city and commune of the Talagante Province in central Chile's Santiago Metropolitan Region.

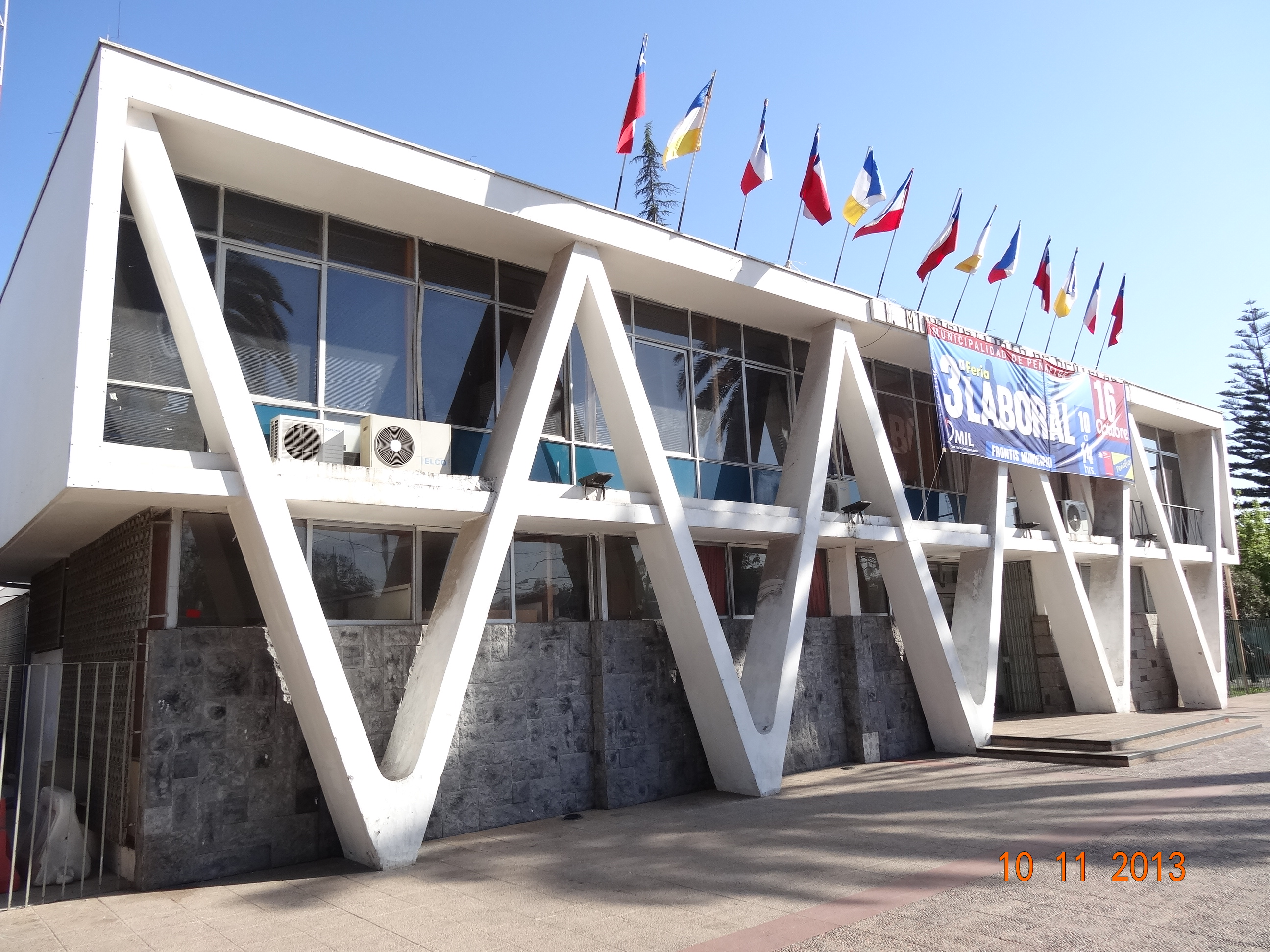
City Hall

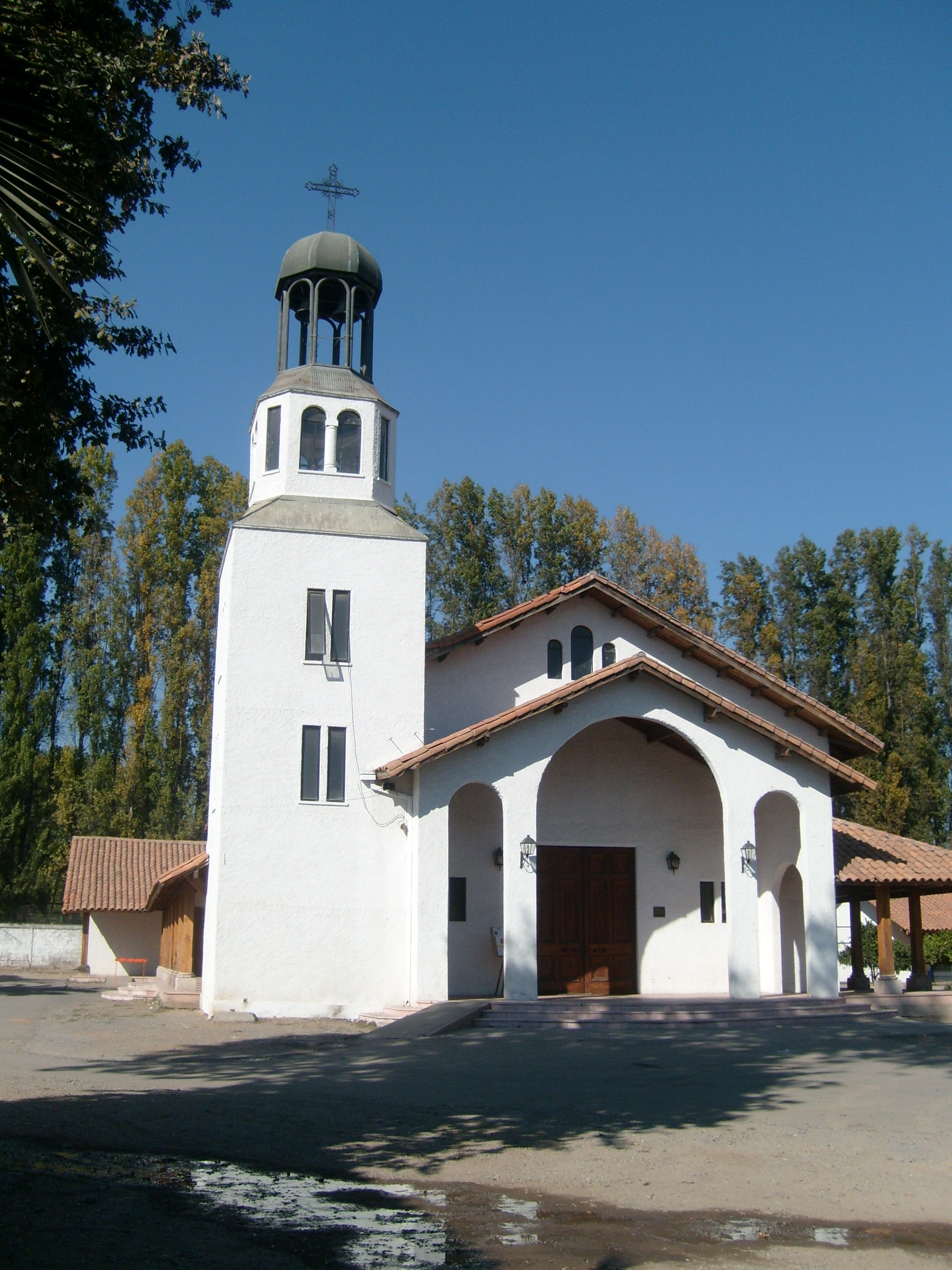
Niño de Dios de Malloco Parish

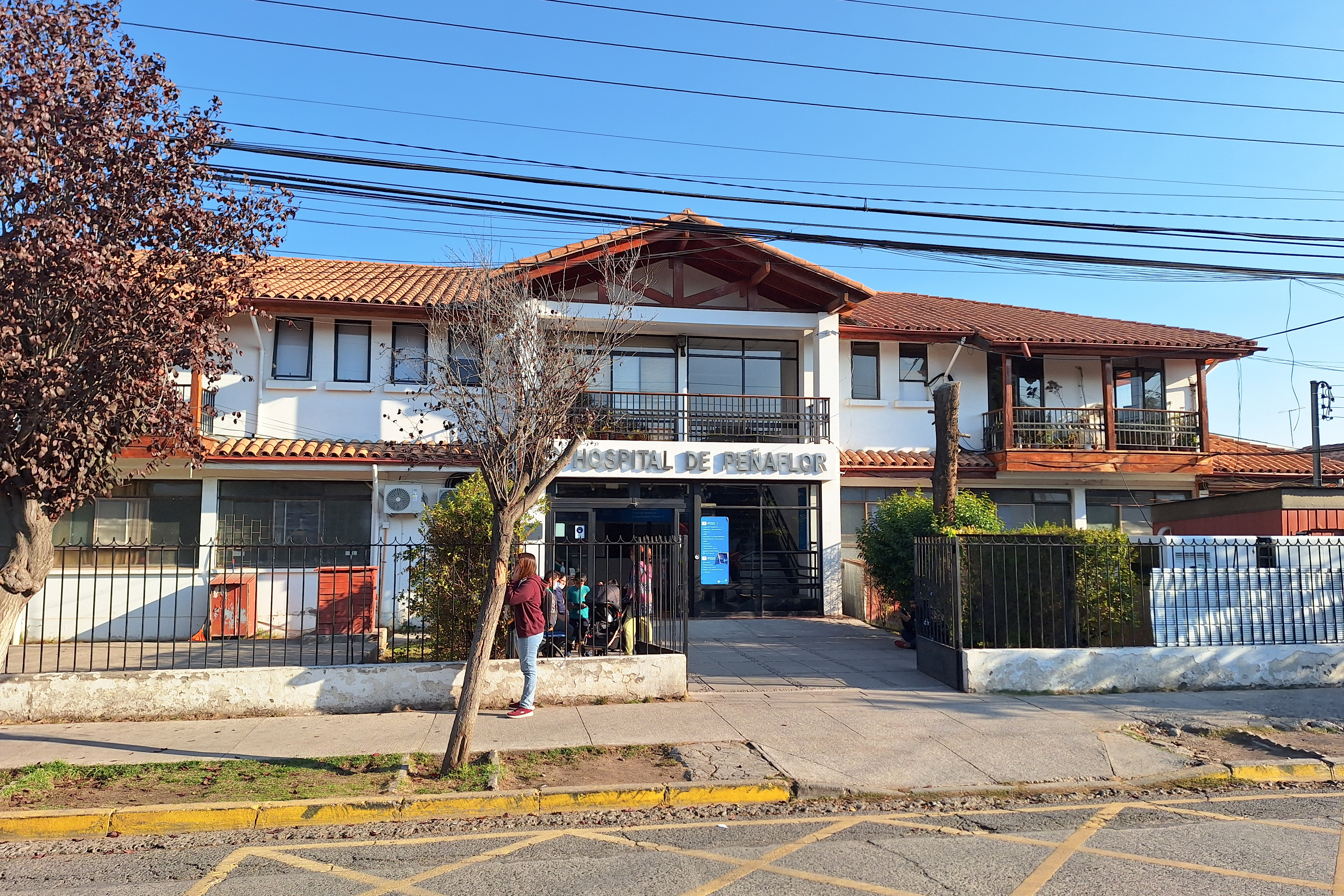
Hospital

== Geography ==
It can be found in the Chilean Central Valley approximately 37 km (23 mi) southwest of the metropolitan area of Santiago. The commune spans an area of 69.2 km^{2} (27 sq mi).

== Demographics ==
According to the 2002 census of the National Statistics Institute, Peñaflor spans an area of 69.2 km^{2} (27 sq mi) and has 66,619 inhabitants (32,671 men and 33,948 women). Of these, 63,209 (94.9%) lived in urban areas and 3,410 (5.1%) in rural areas. The population grew by 32.8% (16,471 persons) between the 1992 and 2002 censuses.

== Administration ==
As a commune, Peñaflor is a third-level administrative division of Chile administered by a municipal council, headed by an alcalde who is directly elected every four years. The 2012-2016 alcalde is Manuel Fuentes Rosales (UDI), and his council members are:

- Jorge Kellendonk Numhauser (UDI)
- Teresita Acevedo Lara (IND)
- Guillermo Donoso Aguilar (UDI)
- Jorge Navarrete Urzua (PS)
- Juan Plaza Núñez (IND)
- Juan Caroca Suarez (PDC)

Within the electoral divisions of Chile, Peñaflor is represented in the Chamber of Deputies by Denise Pascal (PS) and Gonzalo Uriarte (UDI) as part of the 31st electoral district, (together with Talagante, El Monte, Isla de Maipo, Melipilla, María Pinto, Curacaví, Alhué, San Pedro and Padre Hurtado). The commune is represented in the Senate by Guido Girardi Lavín (PPD) and Jovino Novoa Vásquez (UDI) as part of the 7th senatorial constituency (Santiago-West).

== Notable people ==
- Magdalena Petit, writer
- Igor Lichnovsky, footballer
