= María Pinto =

- Town and Commune
- Location in the Santiago Metropolitan Region Location in Chile
- Coordinates (town): 33°31′S 71°7′W
- Country: Chile
- Region: Santiago Metro.
- Province: Melipilla

Government
  - Type: Municipality
  - Alcalde: Cesar Araos Aguirre (UDI)

Area
  - Total: 395.0 km^{2} (152.5 sq mi)

Population (2002 Census)
  - Total: 10,343
  - Density: 26.18/km^{2} (67.82/sq mi)
  - Urban: 1,654
  - Rural: 8,689

Sex
  - Men: 5,218
  - Women: 5,125
- Time zone: UTC-4 (CLT)
  - Summer (DST): UTC-3 (CLST)
- Area code: 56 + 53
- Website: Municipality of María Pinto

María Pinto is a town and commune of the Melipilla Province in central Chile's Santiago Metropolitan Region.

== Administration ==
As a commune, María Pinto is a third-level administrative division of Chile administered by a municipal council, headed by an alcalde who is directly elected every four years. The 2012-2016 alcalde is Cesar Araos Aguirre (UDI), and his council members are:

- Mario Donoso Araya (PDC)
- Elias Jacob Hirmas (IND)
- Carlos Acevedo Barrera (UDI)
- Margarita Cofré Olguin (PDC)
- Sonia Vargas Farias (PPD)
- Claudia Atabales Alarcón (UDI)

Within the electoral divisions of Chile, María Pinto is represented in the Chamber of Deputies by Denise Pascal (PS) and Gonzalo Uriarte (UDI) as part of the 31st electoral district, (together with Talagante, Peñaflor, El Monte, Isla de Maipo, Melipilla, Curacaví, Alhué, San Pedro and Padre Hurtado). The commune is represented in the Senate by Guido Girardi Lavín (PPD) and Jovino Novoa Vásquez (UDI) as part of the 7th senatorial constituency (Santiago-West).
