= Talagante =

- City and Commune
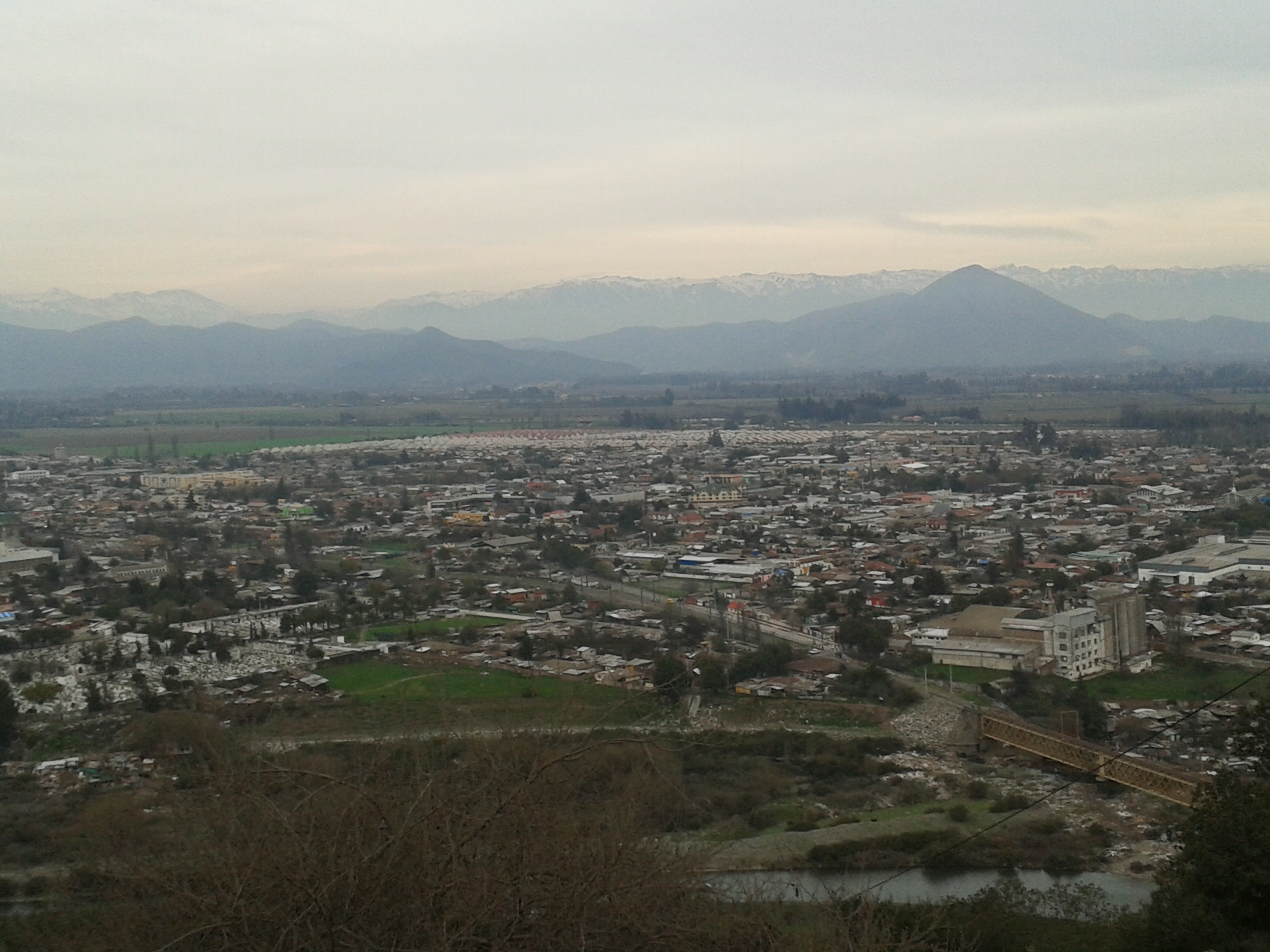
- Panoramic view

- Coat of arms Talagante in the Santiago Metropolitan Region Location in Chile
- Coordinates: 33°40′S 70°52′W
- Country: Chile
- Region: Santiago Metro.
- Province: Talagante
- Founded: 1837

Government
  - Type: Municipality
  - Alcalde: Carlos Álvarez Esteban (PS)

Area
  - Total: 321.7 km^{2} (124.2 sq mi)
  - Rank: 2
- Elevation: 313 m (1,027 ft)

Population (2002 Census)
  - Total: 59,805
  - Rank: 2
  - Density: 185.9/km^{2} (481.5/sq mi)
  - Urban: 49,957
  - Rural: 9,848

Sex
  - Men: 29,468
  - Women: 30,337
- Time zone: UTC-4 (CLT)
  - Summer (DST): UTC-3 (CLST)
- Area code: 56
- Website: Municipality of Talagante website

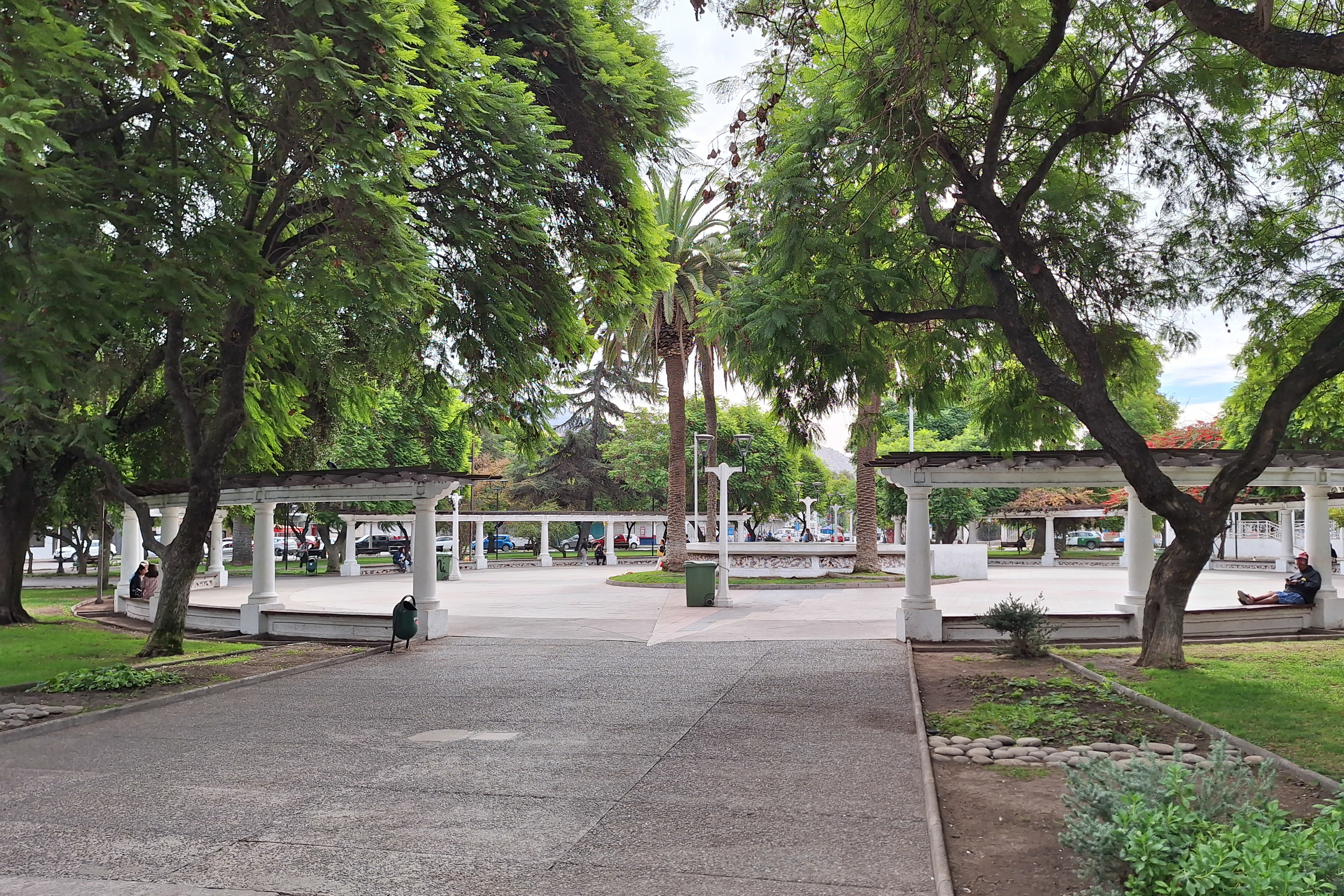
Plaza de Armas

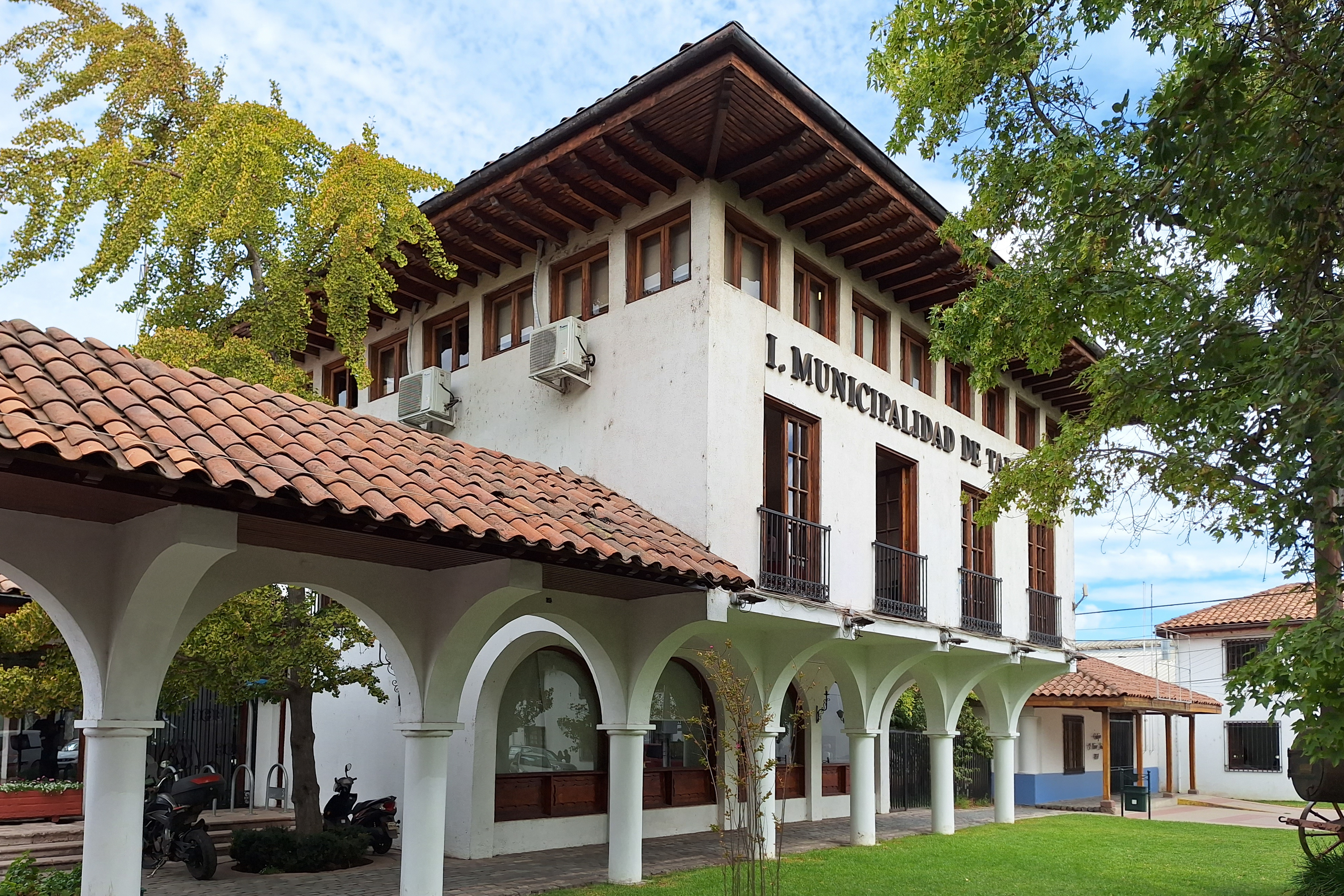
City Hall

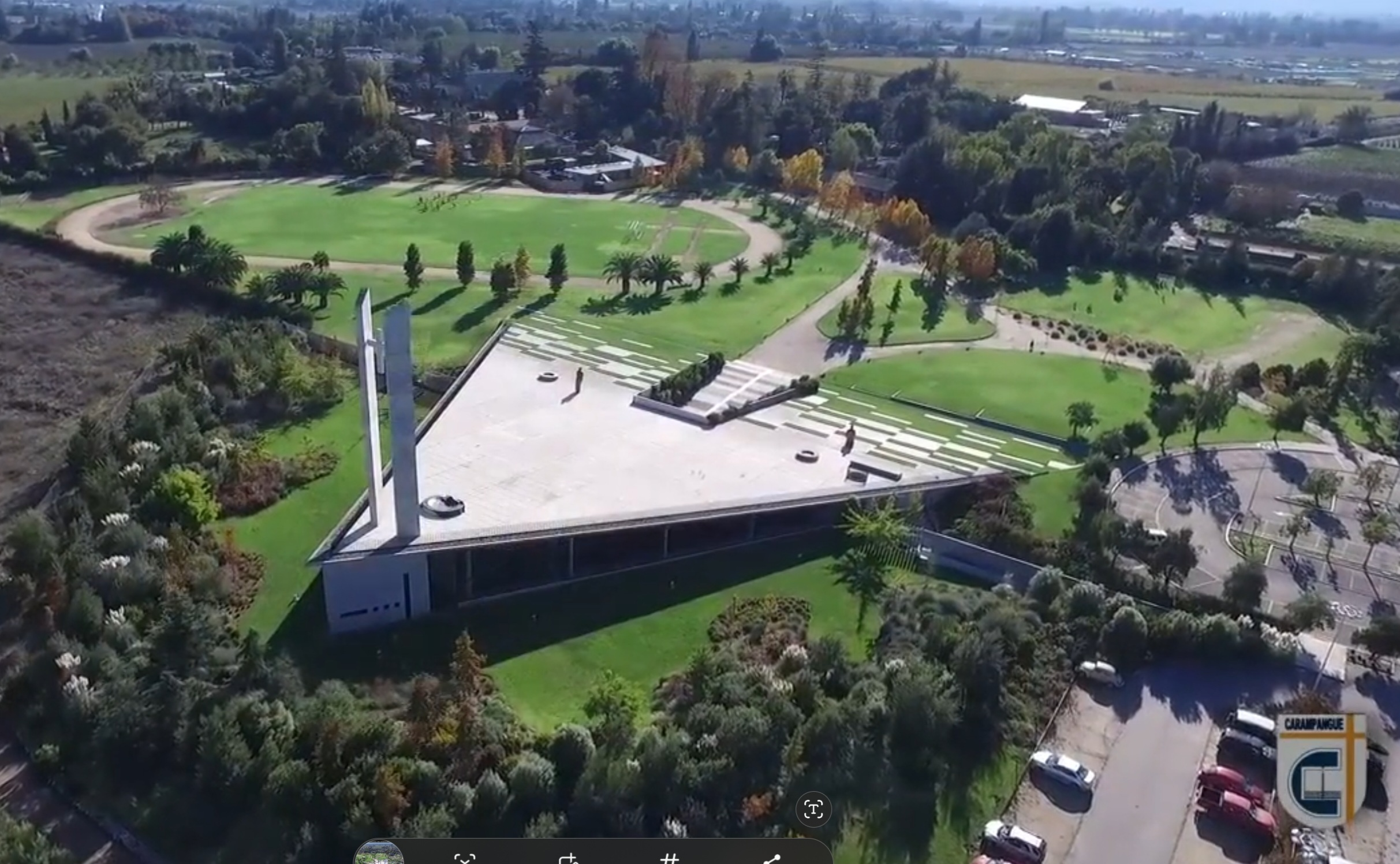
Iglesia Colegio Carampangue

Talagante (Spanish pronunciation: [talaˈɣante]) is a commune and the capital city of the province of the same name in the Santiago Metropolitan Region of central Chile. The word Talagante in Quechua comes from talacanta, meaning "Lazo de Hechicero", which was the proper name of the curaca, or ruler, who dominated this central valley on behalf of the Inca Empire during the arrival of the Spaniards.

== Geography ==
Talagante can be found in the Chilean Central Valley at an elevation of 313 m (1,027 ft), 35 kilometres (22 mi) to the southwest of the national capital of Santiago. The commune spans an area of 125.5 km^{2} (48 sq mi).

== Demographics ==
According to the 2002 census of the National Statistics Institute, Talagante spans an area of 125.5 km^{2} (48 sq mi) and has 59,805 inhabitants (29,468 men and 30,337 women). Of these, 49,957 (83.5%) lived in urban areas and 9,848 (16.5%) in rural areas. The population grew by 132800% (59,760 persons) between the 1992 and 2002 censuses.

== Administration ==
As a commune, Talagante is a third-level administrative division of Chile administered by a municipal council, headed by an alcalde who is directly elected every four years. The 2012-2016 alcalde is Raúl Leiva Carvajal (IND), and his council members are:

- Luis Silva Pavez (PDC)
- Sebastián Rosas Guerrero (PS)
- Patricio Huerta Moraga (RN)
- María Eugenia Torres Miranda (PPD)
- Félix Donoso Gómez (PS)
- Juan Cartagena Diaz (UDI)

Within the electoral divisions of Chile, Talagante is represented in the Chamber of Deputies by Denise Pascal (PS) and Gonzalo Uriarte (UDI) as part of the 31st electoral district, (together with Peñaflor, El Monte, Isla de Maipo, Melipilla, María Pinto, Curacaví, Alhué, San Pedro and Padre Hurtado). The commune is represented in the Senate by Guido Girardi Lavín (PPD) and Jovino Novoa Vásquez (UDI) as part of the 7th senatorial constituency (Santiago-West).
