= Padre Hurtado =

- Commune
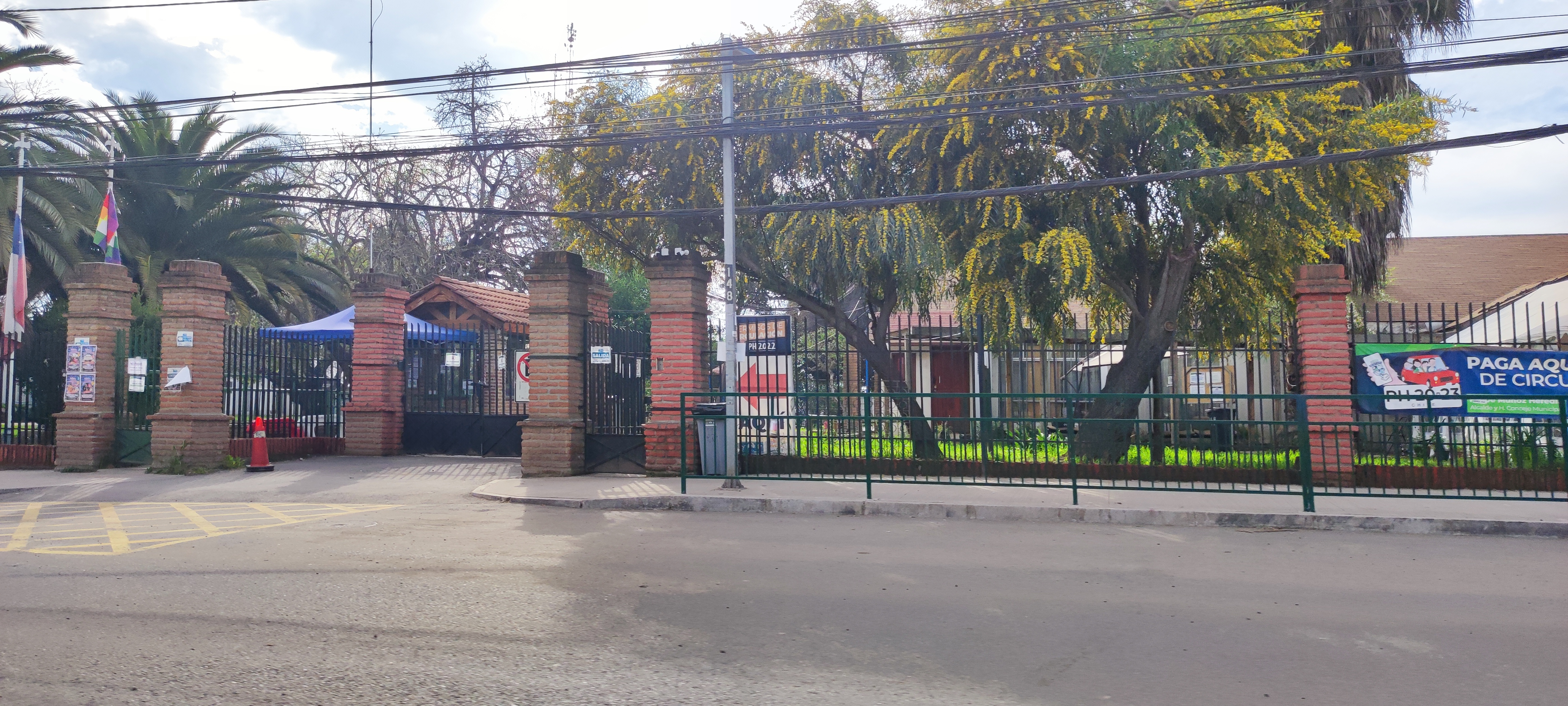
- City Hall

- Map of Padre Hurtado within Greater Santiago Location in Chile
- Coordinates (city): 33°34′S 70°50′W
- Country: Chile
- Region: Metropolitan
- Province: Talagante
- Founded: 1891
- Named for: Saint Alberto Hurtado

Government
  - Type: Municipality
  - Alcalde: Felipe Muñoz Heredia (PS)

Area
  - Total: 80.8 km^{2} (31.2 sq mi)
- Elevation: 419 m (1,375 ft)

Population (2023 Census)
  - Total: 76,219
  - Density: 943/km^{2} (2,440/sq mi)
  - Urban: 34,257
  - Rural: 4,511
- Demonym: Padrehurtadino

Sex
  - Men: 37,785
  - Women: 38,434
- Time zone: UTC-4 (CLT)
  - Summer (DST): UTC-3 (CLST)
- Area code: 56 +
- Website: Municipality of Padre hurtado

Padre Hurtado (Spanish pronunciation: [ˈpaðɾe wɾˈtaðo]) is a Chilean commune located in the Talagante Province of the Metropolitan Region. It is part of the Greater Santiago conurbation and is one of its outermost communes. The commune is named in honor of Saint Alberto Hurtado, commonly known as Padre Hurtado ("Father Hurtado").

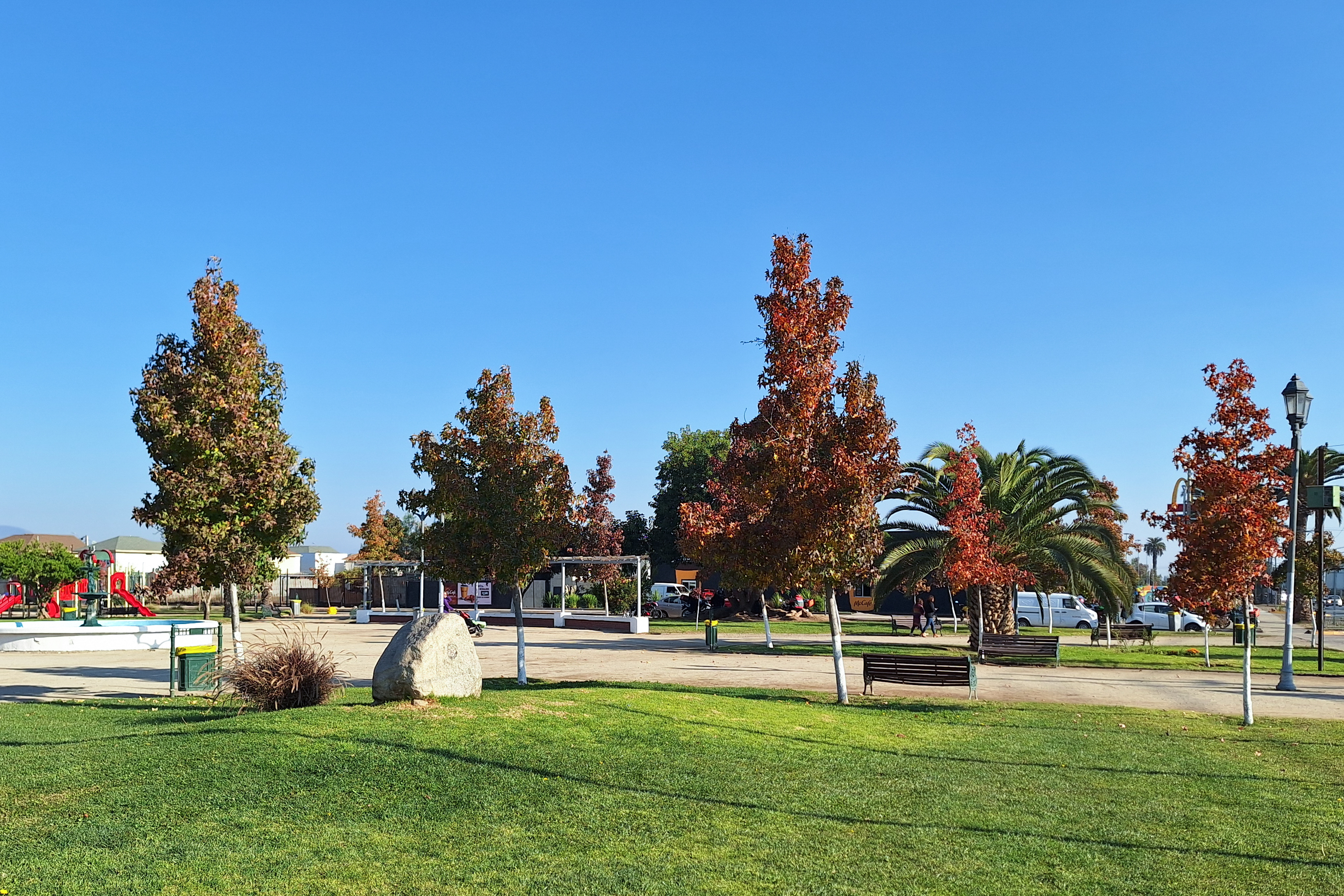
Plaza de Padre Hurtado

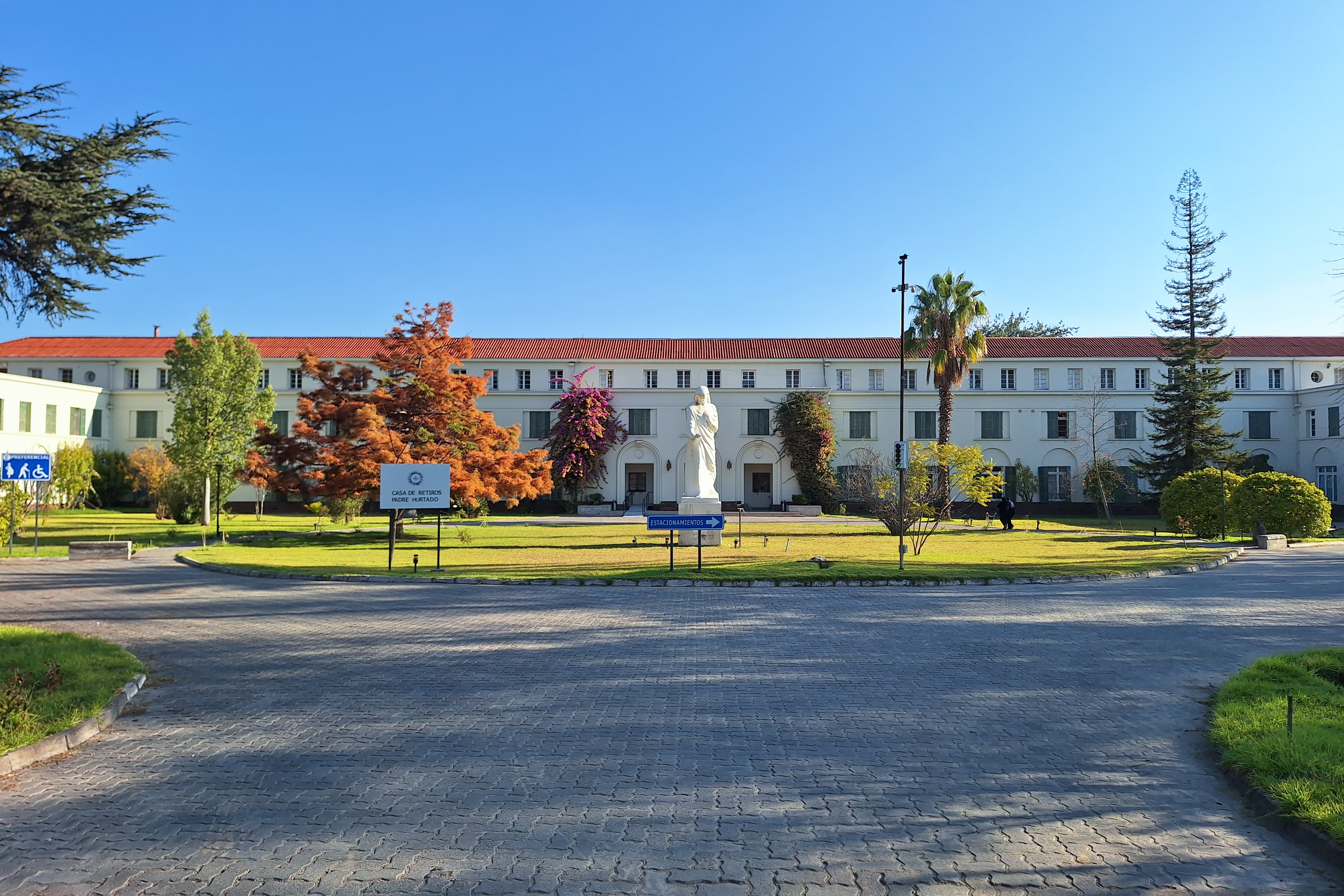
Loyola Spiritual Center

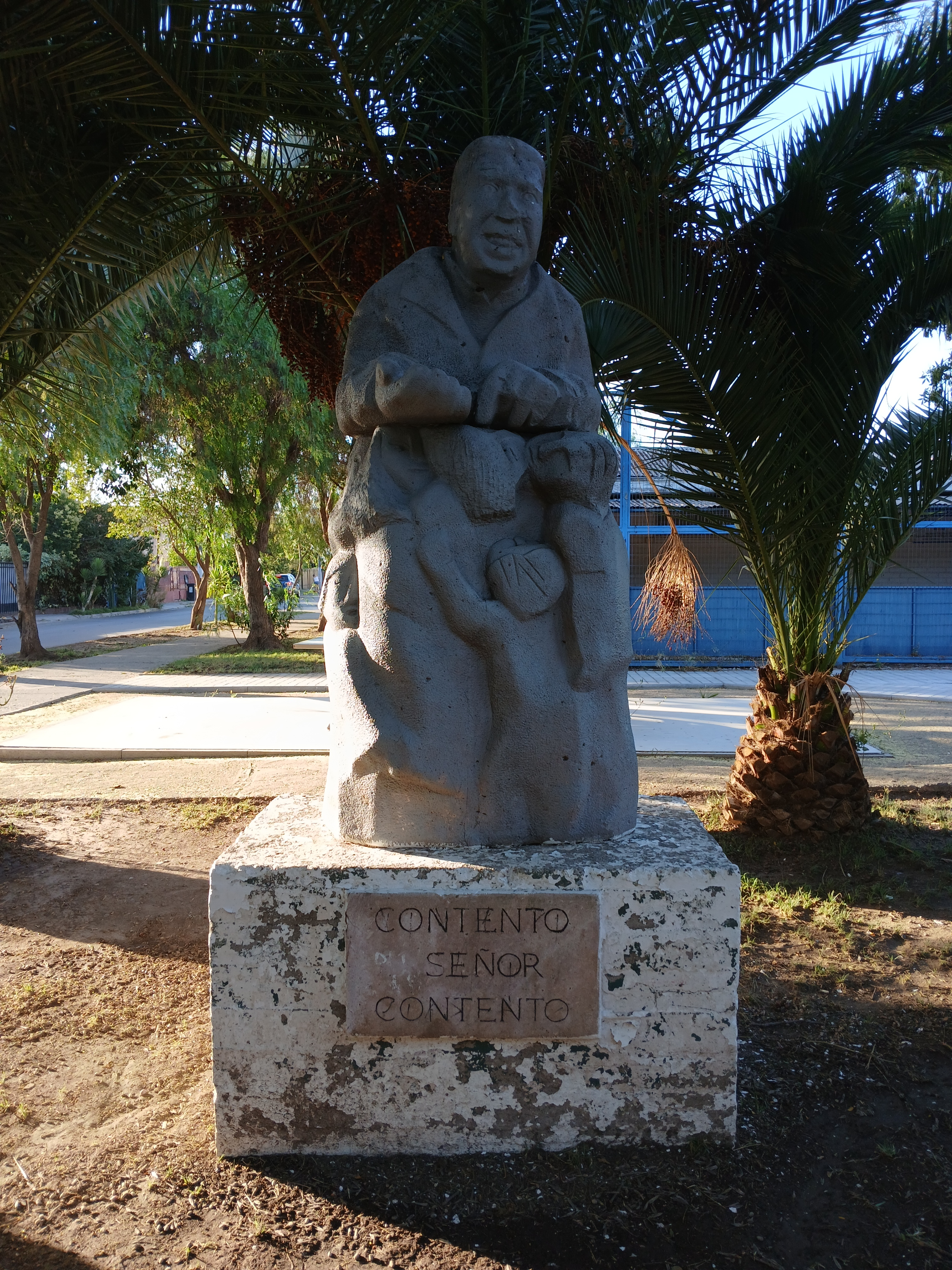
Saint Alberto Hurtado statue

== Demographics ==
According to the 2002 census of the National Statistics Institute, Padre Hurtado spans an area of 80.8 km^{2} (31 sq mi) and has 38,768 inhabitants (19,367 men and 19,401 women). Of these, 34,257 (88.4%) lived in urban areas and 4,511 (11.6%) in rural areas. The population grew by 32% (9,396 persons) between the 1992 and 2002 censuses.

=== Statistics ===
- Population: 45.529 (2006 projection)
- Average annual household income: US$14,278 (PPP, 2006)
- Population below poverty line: 18.7% (2006)

== Administration ==
As a commune, Padre Hurtado is a third-level administrative division of Chile administered by a municipal council, headed by an alcalde who is directly elected every four years. The 2024-2028 alcalde is Felipe Muñoz Heredia (PS). The communal council has the following members:

- Paz González Zúñiga (UDI)
- Marcela Rojas Flores (PS)
- Ignacio Arias Díaz (Ind/PL)
- Francisco Garrido Sanhueza (RN)
- Daniela Díaz Santibáñez (REP)
- Rocío López Céspedes (FA)

Within the electoral divisions of Chile, Padre Hurtado is represented in the Chamber of Deputies by Denise Pascal (PS) and Gonzalo Uriarte (UDI) as part of the 31st electoral district, (together with Talagante, Peñaflor, El Monte, Isla de Maipo, Melipilla, María Pinto, Curacaví, Alhué and San Pedro). The commune is represented in the Senate by Guido Girardi Lavín (PPD) and Jovino Novoa Vásquez (UDI) as part of the 7th senatorial constituency (Santiago-West).
