= St John of God Hospital =

St John of God Hospital may refer to:

- Hospitals run by the Brothers Hospitallers of Saint John of God, a Catholic religious order
- Hospitals of St John of God Health Care, Australia — see the article for a list
- St John of God Hospital, Scorton, North Yorkshire, England
- St John of God Hospital Sierra Leone, also known as Mabessaneh Hospital
- St. John of God Hospital, Stillorgan, Dublin, Ireland
- St John of God Hospital, Crotone, Italy

== See also ==
- Hospital San Juan de Dios (disambiguation)
