= João de Deus =

João de Deus (English: John of God) may refer to:

- Johannes de Deo (died 1267), also called João de Deus, Portuguese canon law jurist
- John of God (1495–1550), also called João de Deus, Portuguese soldier and saint
- João de Deus Pires Ferreira (1759–1821), Brazilian militant that took part on the Pernambucan revolt
- João de Deus de Nogueira Ramos (1830–1896), Portuguese poet and educator
- João de Deus (actor) (1883–1951), Portuguese film actor in Brazil
- João Teixeira de Faria (born 1942), also called João de Deus, Brazilian psychic and convicted sex offender
- João de Deus (footballer) (born 1976), Portuguese football player and coach
