= San Pedro, Chile =

San Pedro
- Commune
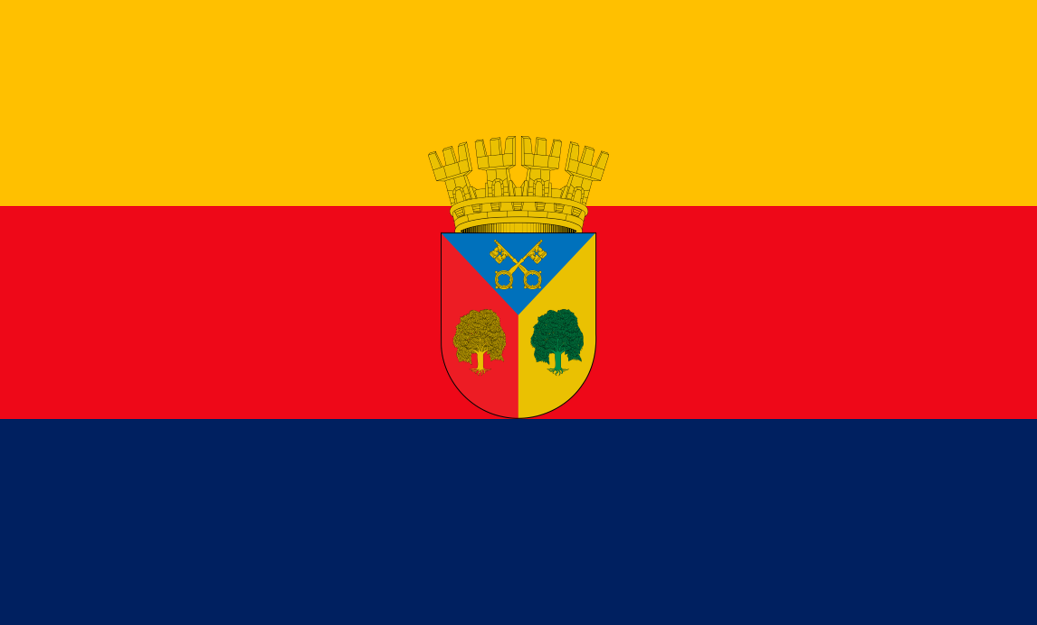
- Flag Coat of arms Location in the Santiago Metropolitan Region Location in Chile
- Coordinates (city): 33°53′40″S 71°27′21″W
- Country: Chile
- Region: Santiago Metro.
- Province: Melipilla

Government
  - Type: Municipality
  - Alcalde: Manuel Devia (UDI)

Area
  - Total: 787.5 km^{2} (304.1 sq mi)

Population (2002 Census)
  - Total: 7,549
  - Density: 9.586/km^{2} (24.83/sq mi)
  - Urban: 0
  - Rural: 7,549

Sex
  - Men: 4,080
  - Women: 3,469
- Time zone: UTC-4 (CLT)
  - Summer (DST): UTC-3 (CLST)
- Area code: 56 + 53
- Website: Municipality of San Pedro

San Pedro (Spanish pronunciation: [sam ˈpeðɾo]) is a commune of the Melipilla Province in central Chile's Santiago Metropolitan Region.

== Demographics ==
According to the 2002 census of the National Statistics Institute, San Pedro spans an area of 787.5 km^{2} (304 sq mi) and has 7,549 inhabitants (4,080 men and 3,469 women), and the commune is an entirely rural area. The population grew by 11.9% (803 persons) between the 1992 and 2002 censuses.

== Administration ==
As a commune, San Pedro is a third-level administrative division of Chile administered by a municipal council, headed by an alcalde who is directly elected every four years. The 2012-2016 alcalde is Florentino Flores Armijo (PDC), and his council members are:

- Emilio Cerda Sagurie (PPD)
- Jeremías Vilches Mondaca (PS)
- Samuel Espinoza Vilches (PRSD)
- Avelino Farías Piña (UDI)
- Juan Ignacio Zúñiga Godoy (RN)
- Pedro Ulloa Ulloa (PH)

Within the electoral divisions of Chile, San Pedro is represented in the Chamber of Deputies by Denise Pascal (PS) and Gonzalo Uriarte (UDI) as part of the 31st electoral district, (together with Talagante, Peñaflor, El Monte, Isla de Maipo, Melipilla, María Pinto, Curacaví, Alhué and Padre Hurtado). The commune is represented in the Senate by Guido Girardi Lavín (PPD) and Jovino Novoa Vásquez (UDI) as part of the 7th senatorial constituency (Santiago-West).
