= Puangue River =

Location
- Country: Chile

Physical characteristics
- Mouth: Maipo River
  - coordinates: 33°44′29″S 71°21′24″W

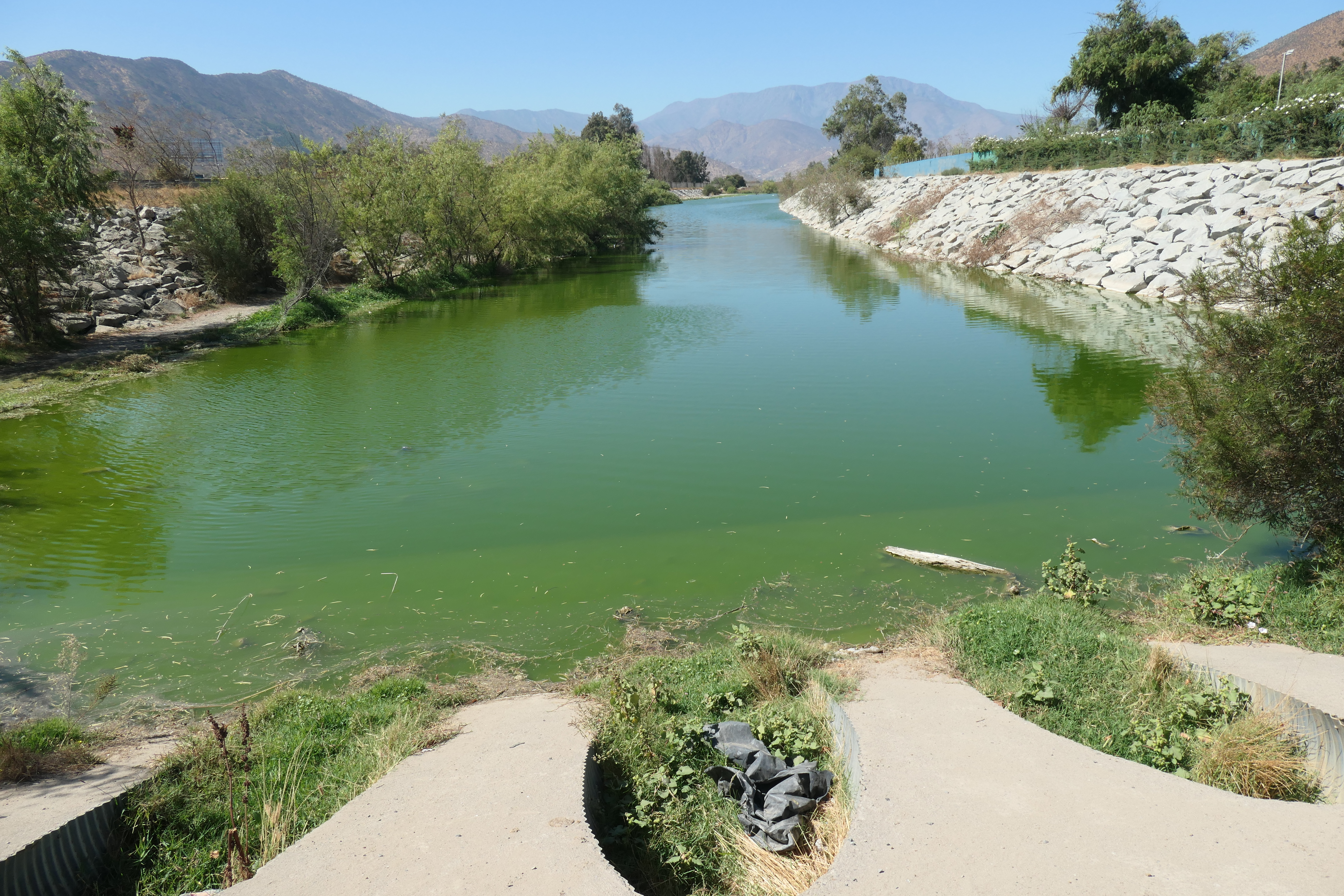

The Puangue River is a river of Chile.

== See also ==
- List of rivers of Chile
