= Melipilla =

- City and Commune
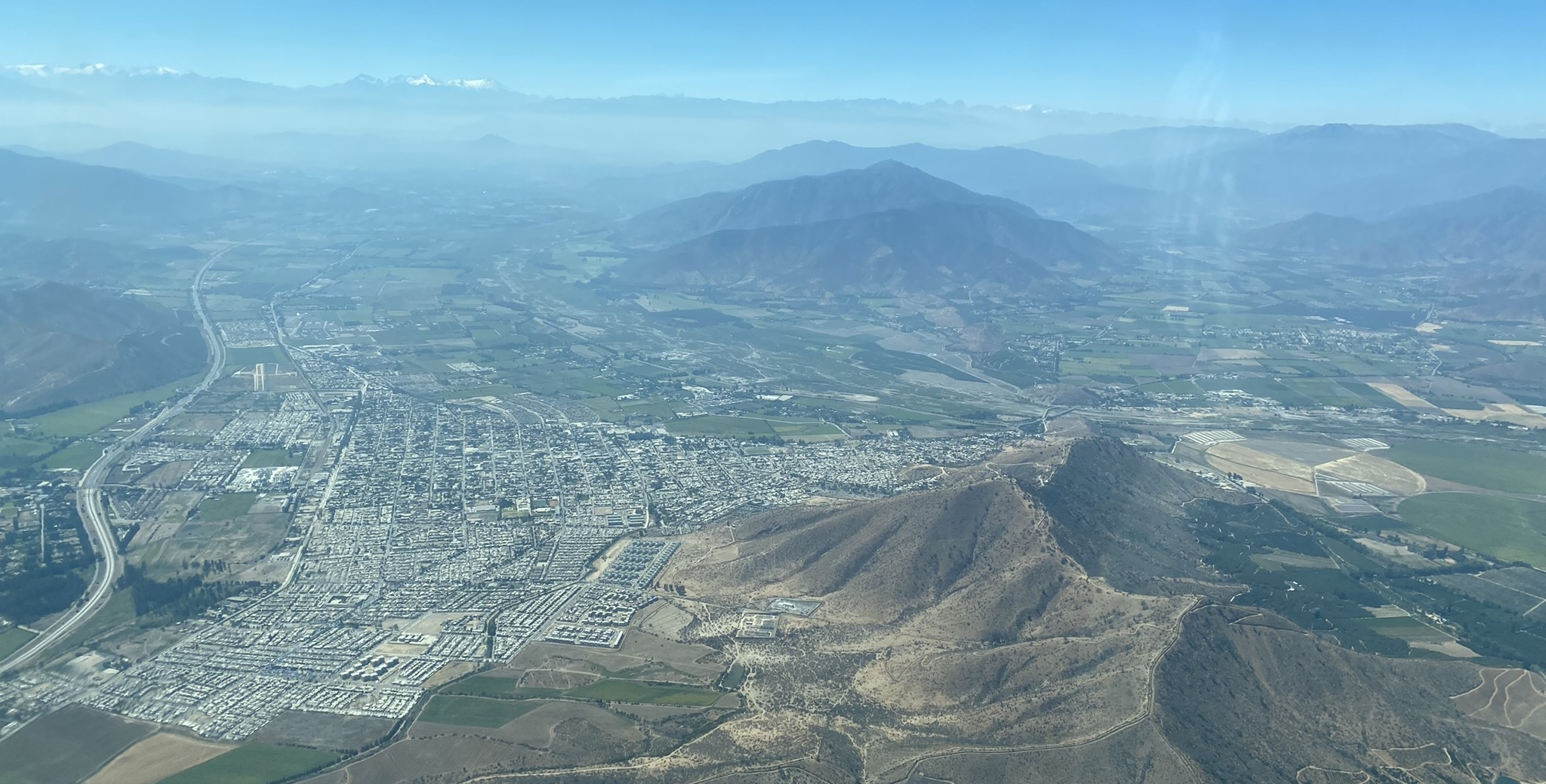

- Coat of arms Location of the Melipillia commune in the Santiago Metropolitan Region Location in Chile
- Coordinates: 33°42′00″S 71°13′00″W
- Country: Chile
- Region: Santiago Metro.
- Province: Melipilla
- Founded: 1742

Government
  - Type: Municipality
  - Alcalde: Iván Campos Aravena ([RN])

Area
  - Total: 1,344.8 km^{2} (519.2 sq mi)
- Elevation: 174 m (571 ft)

Population (2002 Census)
  - Total: 108,540

Sex
- Time zone: UTC-4 (CLT)
  - Summer (DST): UTC-3 (CLST)
- Website: Municipality of Melipilla

Melipilla (Mapudungun for "four Pillans") is a Chilean commune and capital city of the province of the same name. It is part of the Santiago Metropolitan Region and is a significant satellite city of the Chilean capital.

The Melipilla commune borders 10 other communes, María Pinto, and a portion of Curacaví to the north; San Pedro and Alhué to the south; Isla de Maipo, El Monte, Peñaflor, Padre Hurtado in the Talagante Province, and Paine in the Maipo Province to the east; and San Antonio in the Valparaíso Region. It has an area of 1,344.8 km^{2} (519 sq mi). According to the 2017 census, the commune alone has 123,627 residents and is projected to have 141,612 residents by 2020.

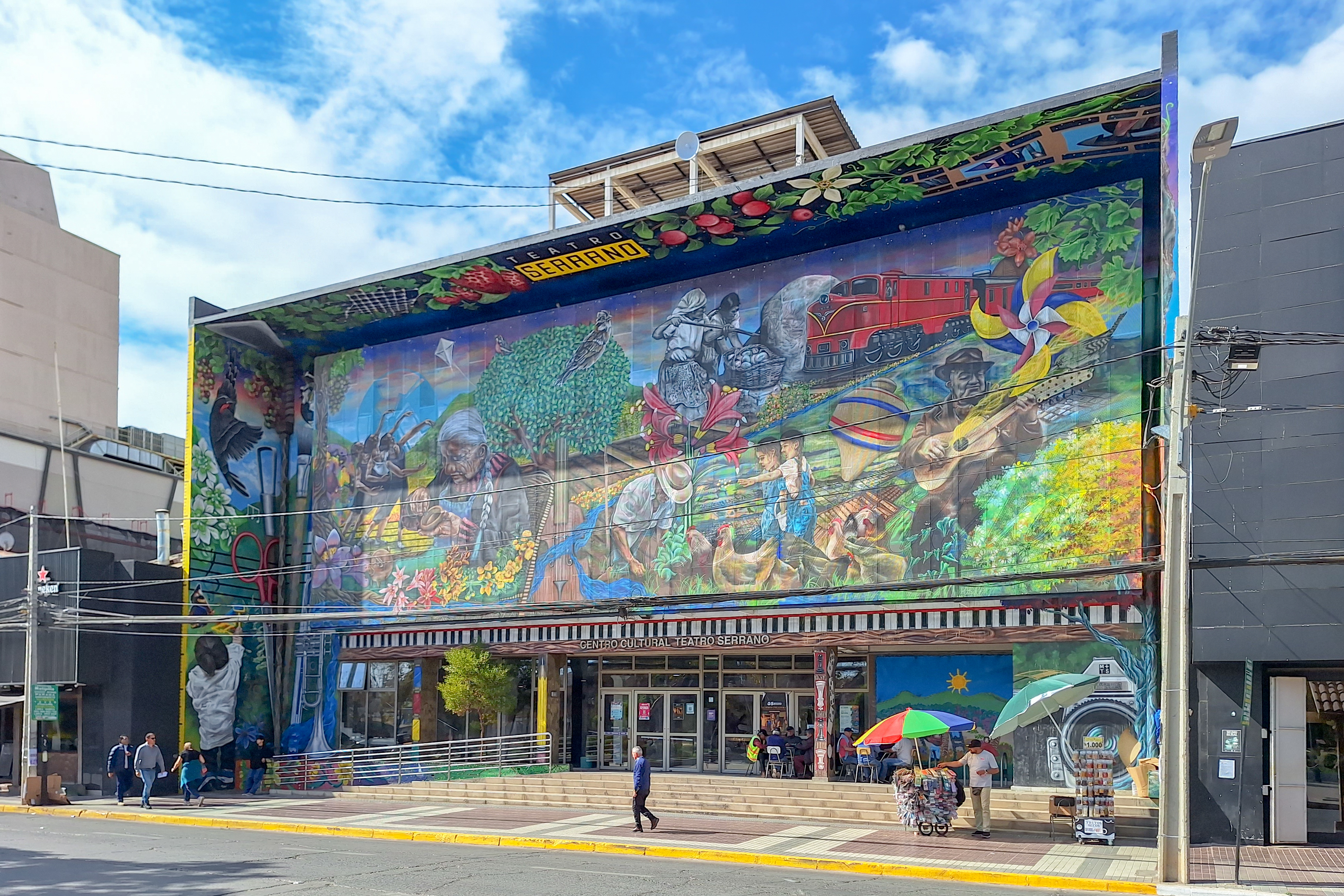
Centro Cultural Teatro Serrano

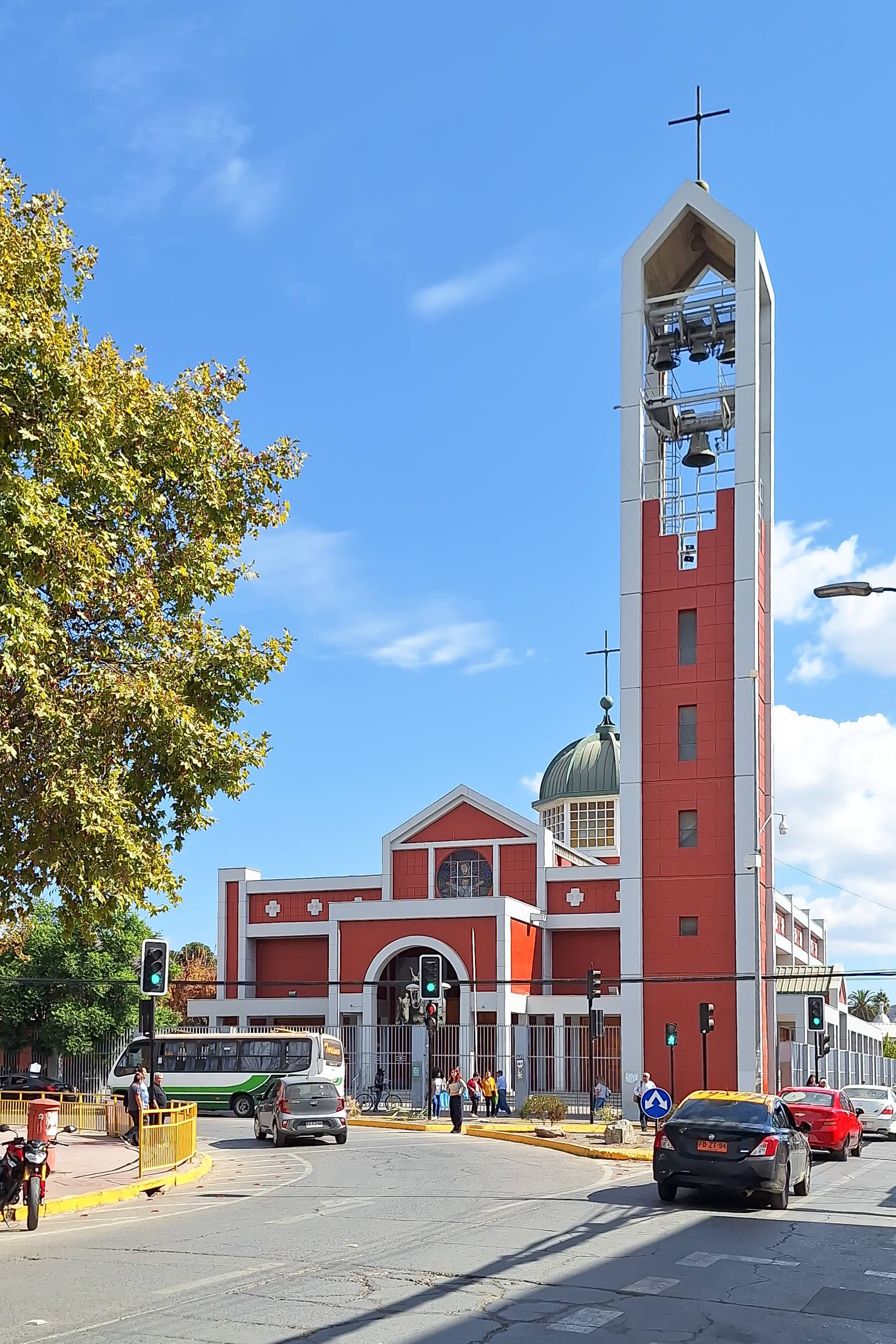
Catedral de San José

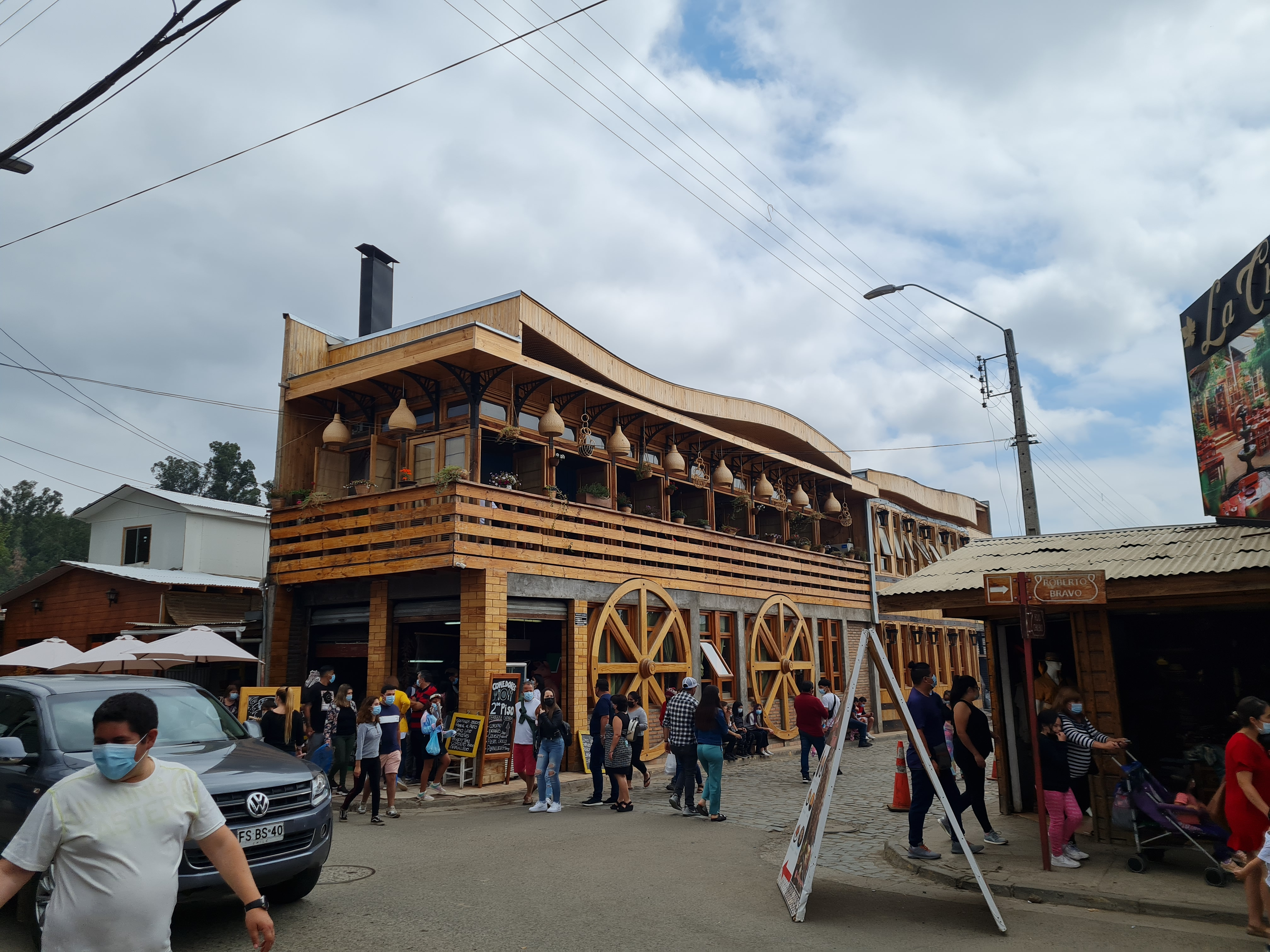
Pomaire

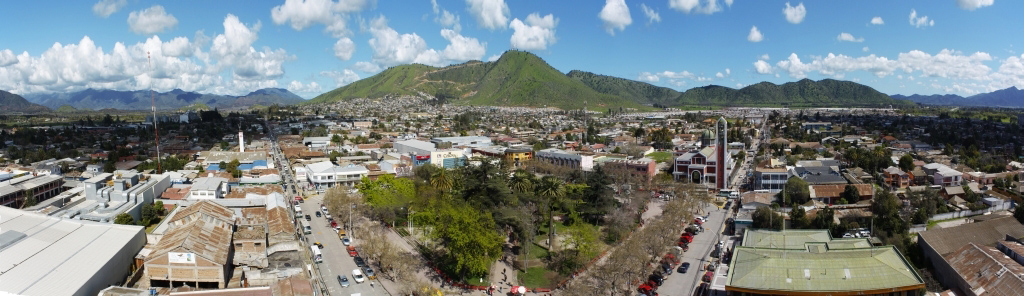
Panoramic view of the city of Melipilla

== Climate ==
Climate data for Melipilla
Month	Jan	Feb	Mar	Apr	May	Jun	Jul	Aug	Sep	Oct	Nov	Dec	Year
Mean daily maximum °C (°F)	12.9 (55.2)	18.1 (64.6)	20.1 (68.2)	24.9 (76.8)	27.9 (82.2)	30.1 (86.2)	30.9 (87.6)	30.2 (86.4)	27.9 (82.2)	24.1 (75.4)	19.1 (66.4)	14.9 (58.8)	23.4 (74.1)
Mean daily minimum °C (°F)	2.1 (35.8)	4.1 (39.4)	6.8 (44.2)	7.7 (45.9)	10.1 (50.2)	12.9 (55.2)	14.1 (57.4)	13.5 (56.3)	11.1 (52.0)	8.2 (46.8)	5.1 (41.2)	3.2 (37.8)	8.1 (46.6)

== History ==
The area has been inhabited since the last glaciation (approx. 11,000 BC). From there, groups of hunters and gatherers belonging to the Archaic Period made their way into the valleys. Subsequently, in relation to the early pottery period, other traces can be found that are continued by the Bato and Llolleo cultures.

In the 15th century, it came into contact with the Inca culture and established a mitimae in Talagante governed by Prince Tala Canta Ilabe. Shortly after the Incas arrived, they were followed by the Spanish, whom the locals called wingka in Mapudungun. The Mapuches who lived in this area were called picones or promaucaes. The most prominent ethnic center of the picones seems to have been located in the town of Pico, located near Melipilla. Precisely, seventy indigenous picones were entrusted to Bishop Rodrigo González Marmolejo by Valdivia. Later, the encomienda was enjoyed by Antonio González Montero, the bishop's nephew. In the 18th century, the town of Pico was located near Pomaire, on the hacienda of the same name, about 8 km northwest of Melipilla. Probably, Pico was a head of relief, since a cacique with that name appeared among the "exalted heads" of the Kingdom, in Valdivia's time.

=== Founding ===
Melipilla was officially founded on 11 October 1742 by José Manso de Velasco. The governor, at the request of the residents of the district, ordered the establishment of a town where families who lived scattered in the district could gather. Manso de Velasco stopped in the Melipilla valley after visiting Valparaíso's fortifications and, after recognizing the location, decreed the establishment of a town on a spacious and pleasant plain located about half a league from the north bank of the Maipo River. The town was named Logroño de San José and the district governor was charged with implementing the establishment according to the instructions that were followed in such cases.

== Demographics ==
According to the 2002 census of the National Statistics Institute, it has 108,540 inhabitants. An approximate population of 116,680 inhabitants is estimated in 2015. Melipilla spans an area of 1,355.8 km^{2} (523 sq mi). Of these, 60,898 (64.4%) lived in urban areas and 33,642 (35.6%) in rural areas.

== Administration ==
As a commune, Melipilla is a third-level administrative division of Chile administered by a municipal council, headed by an alcalde who is directly elected every four years. The 2016–2020 alcalde is Ivan Campos. The council has the following members:

- Darío Jeréz Jeréz (PPD)
- Juan Manuel González Alarcón (PDC)
- José Guerra Silva (PPD)
- Javier Ramírez González (UDI)
- Daniel Domínguez (PDC)
- Claudio Martínez Medina (PS)
- Fernando Pérez Aguirre (UDI)
- Alexander Henríquez Armijo (RN)

Within the electoral divisions of Chile, Melipilla is represented in the Chamber of Deputies by Raúl Leiva (PS), Marisela Santibáñez (PC), Juan Antonio Coloma (UDI), Jaime Bellolio (UDI), Leonardo Soto (PS) and Renato Garín (RD) as part of the 14st electoral district. The commune is represented in the Senate by Guido Girardi Lavín (PPD) and Andrés Allamand (RN).

== Economy ==
In 2018, there were 2,804 registered businesses in Melipilla. The Economic Complexity Index (ECI) in the same year was 1.23, and the economic activities with the highest Revealed Comparative Advantage (RCA) index were Cheese Processing (162.89), Wholesale Sale of Live Animals (98.76), and Chicken Farming for Meat Production (88.96).

== Transport ==
Melitrén, a commuter rail line linking Melipilla with Santiago is currently being planned.
