= List of tunnels in Chile =

This list of tunnels in Chile includes any road, rail or waterway tunnel in Chile.

- Angostura Tunnel
- Caracoles Tunnel
- Chacabuco Tunnel
- Curvo Tunnel
- Cristo Redentor Tunnel
- El Farellón Tunnel
- El Melón Tunnel
- Jardín Botanico O. Tunnel
- Jardín Botanico P. Tunnel
- La Calavera Tunnel
- La Grupa Tunnel
- Las Astas Tunnel
- Las Palmas Tunnel
- Las Raíces Tunnel
- Lo Prado Tunnel
- Pedro Galleguillos Tunnel
- Puclaro Tunnel
- Recto Tunnel
- Zapata Tunnel

== See also ==
- List of tunnels by location
