= Talagante Province =

Talagante Province Provincia de Talagante
- Province
- Seal

- Location in the Santiago Metropolitan Region

- Location in Chile
- Coordinates: 33°40′S 70°55′W
- Country: Chile
- Region: Santiago Metropolitan
- Capital: Peñaflor
- Communes: List of 5:

Government
  - Type: Provincial
  - Presidential Provincial Delegate: Stephanie Duarte Moreno (Comunes)

Area
  - Total: 582.3 km^{2} (224.8 sq mi)
  - Rank: 6

Population (2012 Census)
  - Total: 262,665
  - Rank: 4
  - Density: 451.1/km^{2} (1,168/sq mi)
  - Urban: 188,572
  - Rural: 28,877

Sex
  - Men: 107,935
  - Women: 109,514
- Time zone: UTC-4 (CLT)
  - Summer (DST): UTC-3 (CLST)
- Area code: 56 + 2
- Website: Delegation of Talagante

Talagante Province (Spanish: Provincia de Talagante, Spanish pronunciation: [talaˈɣante]) is one of six provinces of the Santiago Metropolitan Region in central Chile. The capital is the city of Talagante, located approximately 35 km (22 mi) southwest of the national capital of Santiago. The most northeastern part of the province is included in the Santiago conurbation.

== Administration ==
As a province, Talagante is a second-level administrative division of Chile, governed by a provincial delegate who is appointed by the president.

=== Communes ===
The province comprises five communes (Spanish: comunas), each governed by a municipality consisting of an alcalde and municipal council:

- Isla de Maipo
- El Monte
- Padre Hurtado
- Peñaflor
- Talagante

== Geography and demography ==
The province spans an area of 582.3 square kilometres (582 km^{2}), the smallest in the Santiago Metropolitan Region. According to the 2002 census, Talagante was the fourth most populous province in the region with a total population of 188,572. At that time, there were 188,572 people living in urban areas, 28,877 living in rural areas, 107,935 men, and 109,514 women.

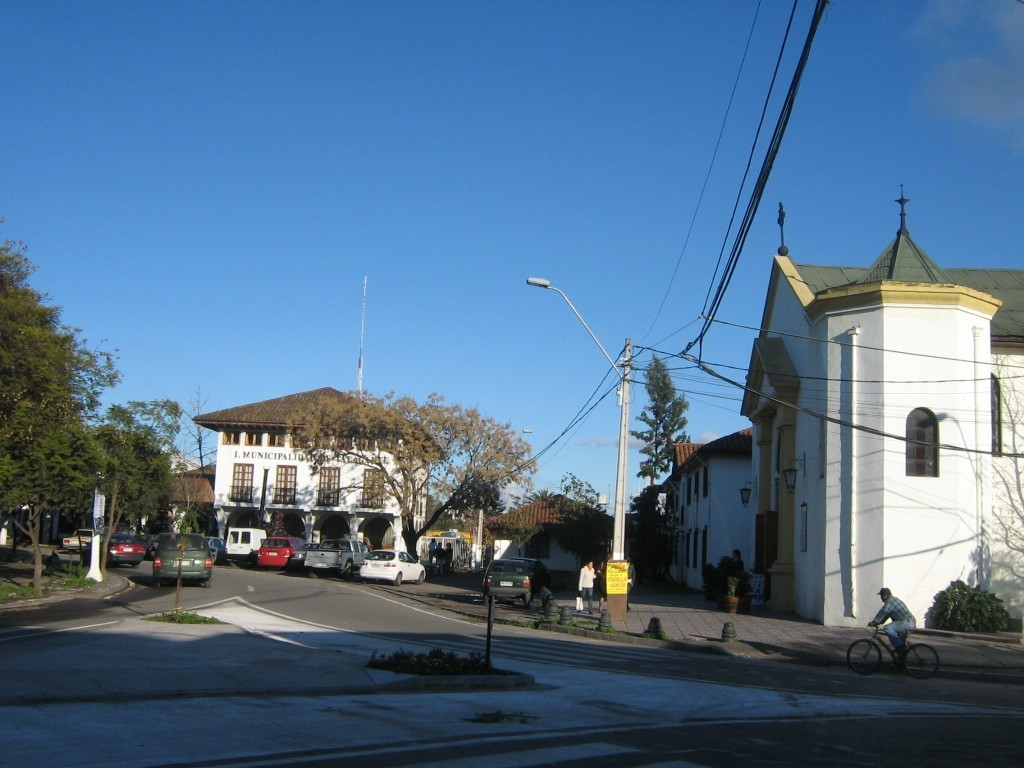
Talagante downtown
