= Melipilla Province =

Melipilla Province Provincia de Melipilla
- Province
- Seal Location in the Santiago Metropolitan Region Location in Chile
- Coordinates: 33°44′S 71°11′W
- Country: Chile
- Region: Santiago Metropolitan
- Capital: Melipilla
- Communes: List of 5: Curacaví; María Pinto; Melipilla; San Pedro; Alhué

Government
  - Type: Provincial

Area
  - Total: 4,065.7 km^{2} (1,569.8 sq mi)

Population (2024 Census)
  - Total: 205,718
  - Density: 50.598/km^{2} (131.05/sq mi)
- Time zone: UTC−4 (CLT)
  - Summer (DST): UTC-3 (CLST)
- Area code: 56 + 2
- Website: dppmelipilla.gob.cl

Melipilla Province (Spanish: Provincia de Melipilla) is one of six provinces of the Santiago Metropolitan Region in central Chile. It spans an area of 4,065.7 km^{2} (1,569.8 sq mi). Its capital is Melipilla. It had a population of 205,718 inhabitants as per the 2024 Chilean census.

== History ==
Chile was re-organized into twelve regions excluding the Santiago Metropolitan Area by Law No. 575 enacted on 10 July 1974. The Santiago Metropolitan Region was officially created as per Law No.3260, enacted on 3 March 1980, and was made up of six provinces including Melipilla. Melipilla is derived from Mapudungun language, and means "four Pillans", where Pillan is a spirit or demon.

== Geography ==
Melipilla Province is one of the six provinces of the Santiago Metropolitan Region in Chile. It covers an area of 4,065.7 km^{2} (1,569.8 sq mi), and occupies nearly 26% of the area of the metropolitan region. About 85% of the land area of the province belongs to the Maipo and Rapel River basins, while the remaining are coastal areas. About 63,000 ha (160,000 acres) of the province is covered by forests, which forms sixteen percent of the total land area.

The region has a warm Mediterranean climate (Köppen climate classification: Csb) with an average annual temperature of 16.24 °C (61.23 °F), and an average precipitation of 3.3 cm (1.3 in) annually.

== Administration ==
As a province, Melipilla is a second-level administrative division of Chile, governed by a provincial governor. It is further subdivided into five communes (comunas)–Curacaví, María Pinto, Melipilla, San Pedro, and Alhué. The city of Melipilla serves as the capital of the province.

== Demographics ==
According to the 2024 Chilean census, the province had a population of 205,718 inhabitants. The population consisted of 104,615 females (50.9%) and 101,103 males (49.1%). About 19.2% of the population was below the age of 15 years, 66.3% belonged to the age group of 15–64 years, and 14.5% was aged 65 years or older. The province had an urban population of 124,588 inhabitants (60.6%) and a rural population of 81,130 inhabitants (39.4%).

Most of the residents were born in Chile, accounting for 190,655 inhabitants (92.7%). Indigenous people formed 12,643 inhabitants (6.1%) of the population, while 193,058 inhabitants (93.9%) identified themselves as non-indigenous. Roman Catholics formed the largest religious group with 108,357 adherents (65.6%), followed by Evangelicals or Protestants with 19,458 adherents (11.8%), and 32,836 inhabitants (19.9%) indicating no religious affiliation. Food processing, cheese production, and wine making are the major industries in the region.
