= Provinces of Chile =

Second-level administrative division of Chile

Provinces of Chile Provincias de Chile (Spanish)
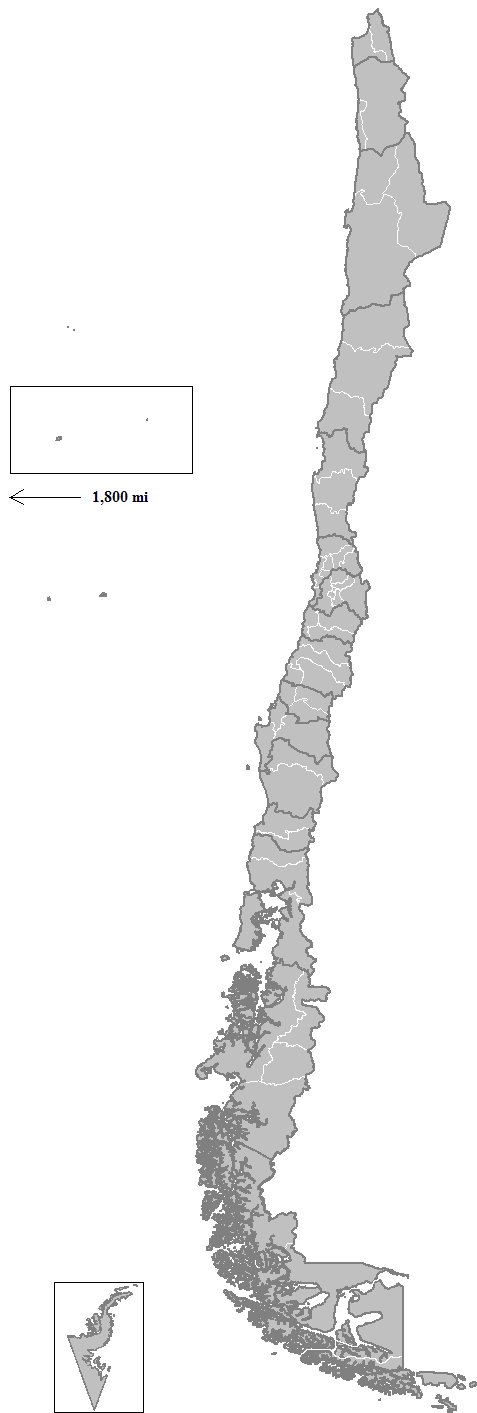
- Category: Unitary unit
- Location: Chile
- Number: 56
- Populations: 2,392 (Antártica Chilena) – 4,997,637 (Santiago Province)
- Areas: 163.6 km^{2} (63.2 sq mi) (Isla de Pascua) - 67,813.5 km^{2} (26,182.9 sq mi) (Antofagasta)
- Government: Provincial government, National government
- Subdivisions: Communes

A province is a second-level administrative division in Chile. There are 56 in total. The top-level administrative division in Chile is the region. There are 16 in total.

Each provincial presidential delegation (delegación presidencial provincial) is headed by a provincial presidential delegate (delegado presidencial provincial) appointed by the President. The governor exercises their powers in accordance with instructions from the regional presidential delegate (delegado presidencial regional). The provincial delegate is advised by the Provincial Economic and Social Council (Consejo Económico y Social Provincial or CESPRO). No provincial presidential delegations exist in those provinces where the regional capital is located; its functions were merged with those of the regional presidential delegate.

The country's provinces are further divided into 346 communes which are administered by an alcalde (mayor) and municipal council.

Until 1976, the 25 provinces were the broadest administrative division in Chile. They were: Aconcagua, Aysén (since 1929), Antofagasta, Arauco, Atacama, Biobío, Cautín, Chiloé, Colchagua, Concepción, Coquimbo, Curicó, Linares, Llanquihue, Magallanes (since 1929), Malleco, Maule, Ñuble, O'Higgins, Osorno (since 1940), Santiago, Talca, Tarapacá, Valdivia, and Valparaíso.

Chile claims part of Antarctica which it includes in the Antártica Chilena province. Generally, only the South American part of that province is recognized as part of Chile.

== List of provinces ==
The following table gives each province, its capital, surface area and 2002 population according to the National Statistics Institute.

INE Region	Natural Region	Region	Province	Capital	No. of Communes	Area	2002 Population
North	Far North Chile	Arica and Parinacota (XV)	Arica	Arica	2	8,726.4	186,488
North	Far North Chile	Arica and Parinacota (XV)	Parinacota	Putre	2	8,146.9	3,156
North	Far North Chile	Tarapacá (I)	Iquique	Iquique	2	2,835.3	216,419
North	Far North Chile	Tarapacá (I)	Tamarugal	Pozo Almonte	5	39,390.5	22,531
North	Far North Chile	Antofagasta (II)	Antofagasta	Antofagasta	4	67,813.5	318,779
North	Far North Chile	Antofagasta (II)	El Loa	Calama	3	41,999.6	143,689
North	Far North Chile	Antofagasta (II)	Tocopilla	Tocopilla	2	16,236.0	31,516
North	Near North Chile	Atacama (III)	Copiapó	Copiapó	3	32,538.5	155,713
North	Near North Chile	Atacama (III)	Huasco	Vallenar	4	18,201.5	66,491
North	Near North Chile	Atacama (III)	Chañaral	Chañaral	2	24,436.2	32,132
North	Near North Chile	Coquimbo (IV)	Elqui	La Serena	6	16,895.1	365,371
North	Near North Chile	Coquimbo (IV)	Limarí	Ovalle	5	13,553.2	156,158
North	Near North Chile	Coquimbo (IV)	Choapa	Illapel	4	10,131.6	81,681
Central	North Central Chile	Valparaíso (V)	Isla de Pascua	Hanga Roa	1	163.6	3,791
Central	North Central Chile	Valparaíso (V)	Los Andes	Los Andes	4	3,054,1	91,683
Central	North Central Chile	Valparaíso (V)	Marga Marga	Quilpué	4	1,159.0	277,525
Central	North Central Chile	Valparaíso (V)	Petorca	La Ligua	6	4,588.9	70,610
Central	North Central Chile	Valparaíso (V)	Quillota	Quillota	5	1,113.1	175,917
Central	North Central Chile	Valparaíso (V)	San Antonio	San Antonio	6	1,511.6	136,594
Central	North Central Chile	Valparaíso (V)	San Felipe de Aconcagua	San Felipe	6	2,659.2	131,911
Central	North Central Chile	Valparaíso (V)	Valparaíso	Valparaíso	7	2,146.6	651,821
Central	North Central Chile	Santiago Metropolitan (XIII)	Santiago	Santiago	32	2,030.3	4,668,473
Central	North Central Chile	Santiago Metropolitan (XIII)	Cordillera	Puente Alto	3	5,528.3	522,856
Central	North Central Chile	Santiago Metropolitan (XIII)	Maipo	San Bernardo	4	1,120.5	378,444
Central	North Central Chile	Santiago Metropolitan (XIII)	Talagante	Talagante	5	582.3	217,449
Central	North Central Chile	Santiago Metropolitan (XIII)	Melipilla	Melipilla	5	4,065.7	141,165
Central	North Central Chile	Santiago Metropolitan (XIII)	Chacabuco	Colina	3	2,076.1	132,798
Central	North Central Chile	O'Higgins (VI)	Cachapoal	Rancagua	17	7,384.2	542,901
Central	North Central Chile	O'Higgins (VI)	Colchagua	San Fernando	10	5,678.0	196,566
Central	North Central Chile	O'Higgins (VI)	Cardenal Caro	Pichilemu	6	3,324.8	41,160
Central	South Central Chile	Maule (VII)	Talca	Talca	10	9,937.8	352,966
Central	South Central Chile	Maule (VII)	Linares	Linares	8	10,050.2	253,990
Central	South Central Chile	Maule (VII)	Curicó	Curicó	9	7,280.9	244,053
Central	South Central Chile	Maule (VII)	Cauquenes	Cauquenes	3	3,027.2	57,088
Central	South Central Chile	Ñuble (XVI)	Diguillín	Bulnes	9	5,229.5	284,239
Central	South Central Chile	Ñuble (XVI)	Punilla	San Carlos	5	5,202.5	98,479
Central	South Central Chile	Ñuble (XVI)	Itata	Quirihue	7	2,476.5	55,385
Central	South Central Chile	Biobío (VIII)	Concepción	Concepción	12	3,439.0	912,889
Central	South Central Chile	Biobío (VIII)	Biobío	Los Ángeles	14	14,987.9	353,315
Central	South Central Chile	Biobío (VIII)	Arauco	Lebu	7	5,463.3	157,255
South	South Chile	Araucanía (IX)	Cautin	Temuco	21	18,409.0	667,920
South	South Chile	Araucanía (IX)	Malleco	Angol	11	13,433.3	201,615
South	South Chile	Los Ríos (XIV)	Valdivia	Valdivia	8	10,197.2	259,243
South	South Chile	Los Ríos (XIV)	El Ranco	La Unión	4	8,232.3	97,153
South	South Chile	Los Lagos (X)	Llanquihue	Puerto Montt	9	14,876.4	321,493
South	South Chile	Los Lagos (X)	Osorno	Osorno	7	9,223.7	221,509
South	South Chile	Los Lagos (X)	Chiloé	Castro	10	9,181.6	154,766
South	South Chile	Los Lagos (X)	Palena	Futaleufú	4	15,301.9	18,971
South	Austral Chile	Aysén (XI)	Coyhaique	Coihaique	2	12,942.5	51,103
South	Austral Chile	Aysén (XI)	Aysén	Puerto Aysén	3	46,588.8	29,631
South	Austral Chile	Aysén (XI)	General Carrera	Chile Chico	2	11,919.5	6,921
South	Austral Chile	Aysén (XI)	Capitán Prat	Cochrane	3	37,043.6	3,837
South	Austral Chile	Magallanes (XII)	Magallanes	Punta Arenas	4	38,400.8	121,675
South	Austral Chile	Magallanes (XII)	Última Esperanza	Puerto Natales	2	55,443.9	19,855
South	Austral Chile	Magallanes (XII)	Tierra del Fuego	Porvenir	3	22,592.7	6,904
South	Austral Chile	Magallanes (XII)	Antártica Chilena	Puerto Williams	2	15,853.7 (Note: Not including the area of the Antártica commune in Antarctica (1,250,000.0 km^{2}).)	2,392

== See also ==
- Administrative divisions of Chile
