= German Chileans =

Chileans descended from German immigrants

Deutsch-Chilenen · Germanochilenos

Total population
- around 500,000

Regions with significant populations
- Valdivia, Valparaíso, Santiago, Temuco, Talca, Concepción, Viña del Mar, Osorno, Puerto Octay, Puerto Varas, Villarrica.

Languages
- Spanish; German; Hunsrik; Lagunen Deutsch

Religion
- Roman Catholic (majority); Lutheran (minority); Judaism; Irreligion

Related ethnic groups
- Germans, German Americans, German-Argentinians, German-Brazilian, German Canadians, German Mexican, German-Paraguayan, German-Peruvians, German Uruguayans, German Venezuelans, German Australians, German New Zealanders

German Chileans (Spanish: germanochilenos; German: Deutsch-Chilenen) are Chileans descended from German immigrants, about 30,000 of whom arrived in Chile between 1846 and 1914. Most of these were from traditionally Catholic Bavaria, Baden and the Rhineland, and also from Bohemia in the present-day Czech Republic; even included were Alsatians and Poles through Partitions of Poland. A smaller number of Lutherans immigrated to Chile following the failed revolutions of 1848.

From the middle of the 19th century to the present, they have played a significant role in the economic, political and cultural development of the Chilean nation. The 19th-century immigrants settled chiefly in Chile's Araucanía, Los Ríos and Los Lagos regions in the so-called Zona Sur of Chile, including the Chilean lake district. They've gone on to have significant influence in Chilean culture and life. The current President of Chile, José Antonio Kast, is of German origin.

== History ==
=== Germans in the Spanish Empire ===
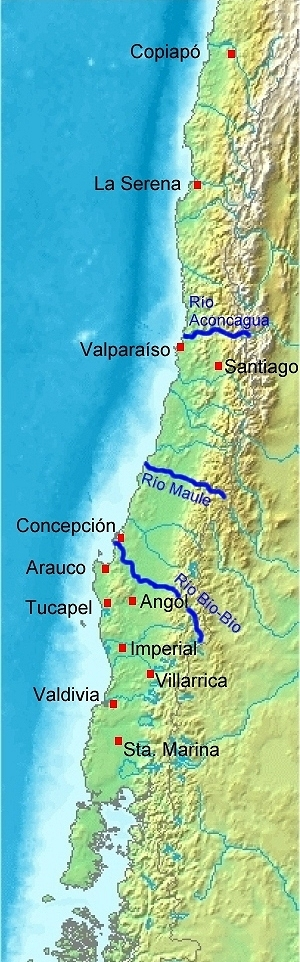
Incursions and settlements of the Conquistadores

The first German to feature in the history of what is now Chile is Bartolomé Blumenthal (Spanish alias Bartolomé Flores) during the 16th century who accompanied Pedro de Valdivia. The latter conquistador ousted the indigenous population and founded the city of Santiago. Valdivia also arrested and took hostage the Cacique (tribal leaders and chiefs) to weaken the society of the local Mapuche people. Blumenthal took part in the defence of the Spanish settlement of Santiago when the Mapuche launched a counter-offensive on 11 September 1541 in attempt to free their caciques held hostage by the conquistadores.

Later Blumenthal took part in the consolidation of the Spanish settlement that would become the Talagante Province; he was the first engineer in the remote colony. Blumenthal's son-in-law, Pedro de Lisperguer (born Peter Lisperger in Worms, Germany), was appointed as mayor of Santiago in 1572.

Johann von Bohon (known in Spanish as Juan Bohón) was also part of Valdivia's expedition and was ordered to establish the city of La Serena in 1544.

=== 19th century ===
==== Hamburg and Valparaíso ====
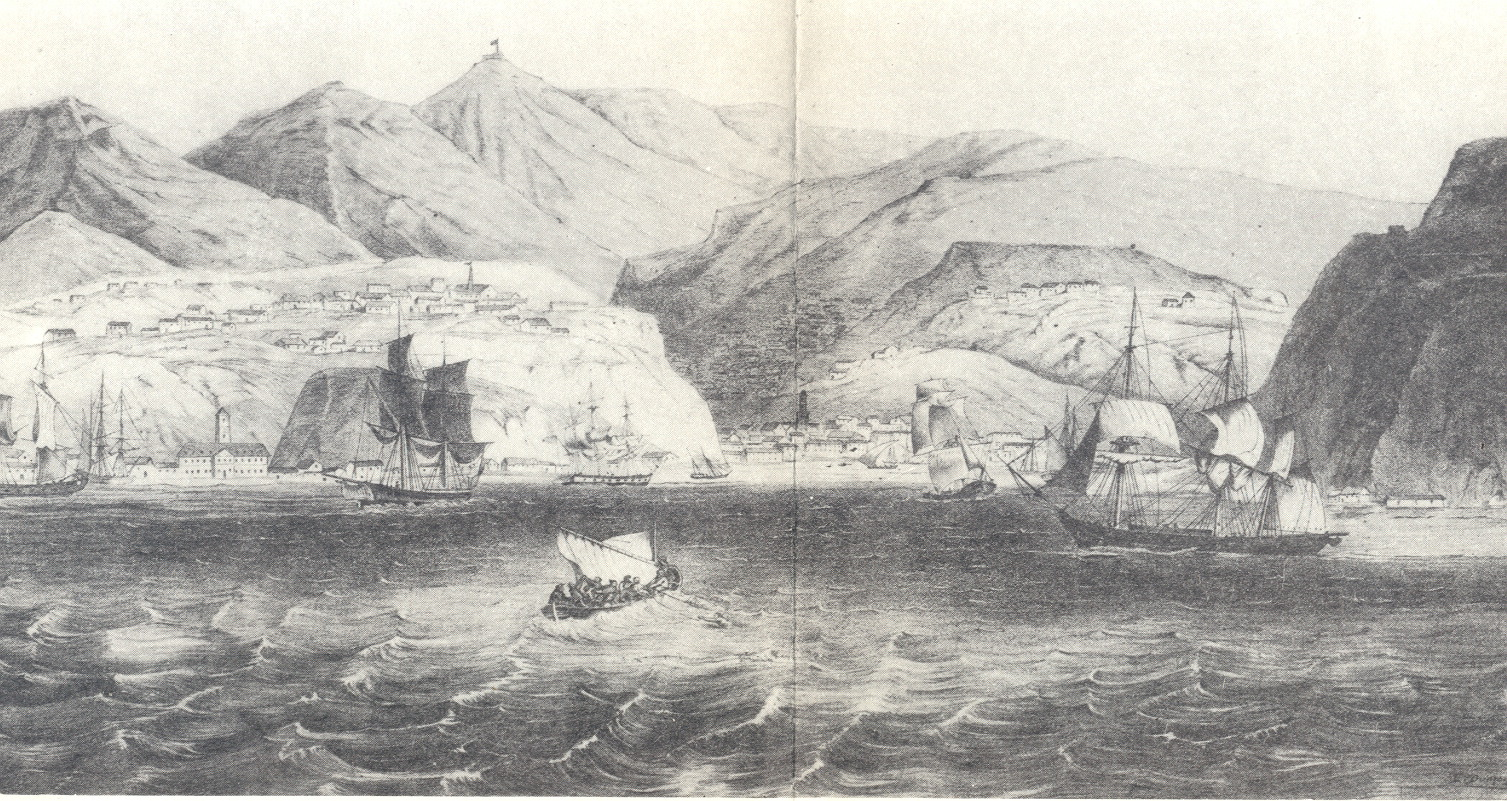
Valparaíso, Chile, in 1830

In 1818 Chile became independent from Spain and began to engage in trading with more nations. The port city of Valparaíso became a major center for trade with Hamburg, with commercial travellers and merchants from Germany staying for lengthy periods of time to work in Valparaíso. Some settled there permanently.

On 9 May 1838 Club Alemán de Valparaíso, the first German cultural organization was established in the city. German residents and visitors held cultural functions here. The club began to organize literary, musical and theatre productions, contributing to the cultural life of the city. Aquinas Ried, a physician, became widely known in the city for composing operas, and for writing poetry and plays. The club had its own orchestras and academic choir (singakademie) which would perform works composed by local musicians. During World War I, the German Club of Valparaiso welcomed Admiral Maximilian von Spee's East Asia Squadron of the Imperial German Navy after they fought the Battle of Coronel off the Chilean coast.

==== Colonization of Southern Chile ====
The Chilean government encouraged German immigration in 1848, a time of revolution in Germany. Before that Bernhard Eunom Philippi recruited nine working families to emigrate from Hesse to Chile.

The origin of the German immigrants in Chile began with the Law of Selective Immigration of 1845. The objective of this law was to bring people of a medium social/high cultural level to colonize the southern regions of Chile; these were between Valdivia and Puerto Montt. The process was administered by Vicente Pérez Rosales by mandate of the then-president Manuel Montt. The German immigrants revived the domestic economy, and they changed the southern zones. The leader of the first colonists, Karl Anwandter, proclaimed their goals:

We shall be honest and laborious Chileans as the best of them, we shall defend our adopted country joining in the ranks of our new countrymen, against any foreign oppression and with the decision and firmness of the man that defends his country, his family and his interests. Never will have the country that adopts us as its children, reason to repent of such illustrated, human and generous proceeding,...

— Carlos Anwandter

The expansion and economic development of Valdivia were limited in the early 19th century. To stimulate economic development, the Chilean government initiated a highly focused immigration program under Vicente Pérez Rosales as government representative. Through this program, thousands of Germans settled in the area, incorporating then-modern technology and know-how to develop agriculture and industry. Some of the new immigrants stayed in Valdivia but others were given forested land, which they cleared for farms.

Valdivia, situated at some distance from the coast, on the Calle-calle river, is a German town. Everywhere you meet German faces, German signboards and placards alongside the Spanish. There is a large German school, a church and various Vereine, large shoe-factories, and, of course, breweries...

— Carl Skottsberg

For ten years after the Revolutions of 1848 in the German states, numerous liberal immigrants came from Germany, exiles of the revolutions. They settled primarily in the Llanquihue in the towns of Frutillar, Puerto Octay, Puerto Varas, Osorno and Puerto Montt. Around 1900, Valdivia prospered with industries, including the Hoffmann Gristmill and the Rudloff shoe factory.

=== 20th century ===
By the mid-1930s, most of the farming land around the towns of Valdivia and Osorno had been claimed. Some German immigrants moved further south to places such as Puyuhuapi in the Aysén region (settled by Sudeten Germans from present-day Czech Republic); Sudeten German settlers from Broumov (called Braunau in German and located in present-day Czech Republic) also stayed and lived in Puerto Varas, wherein the village was called Nueva Braunau.

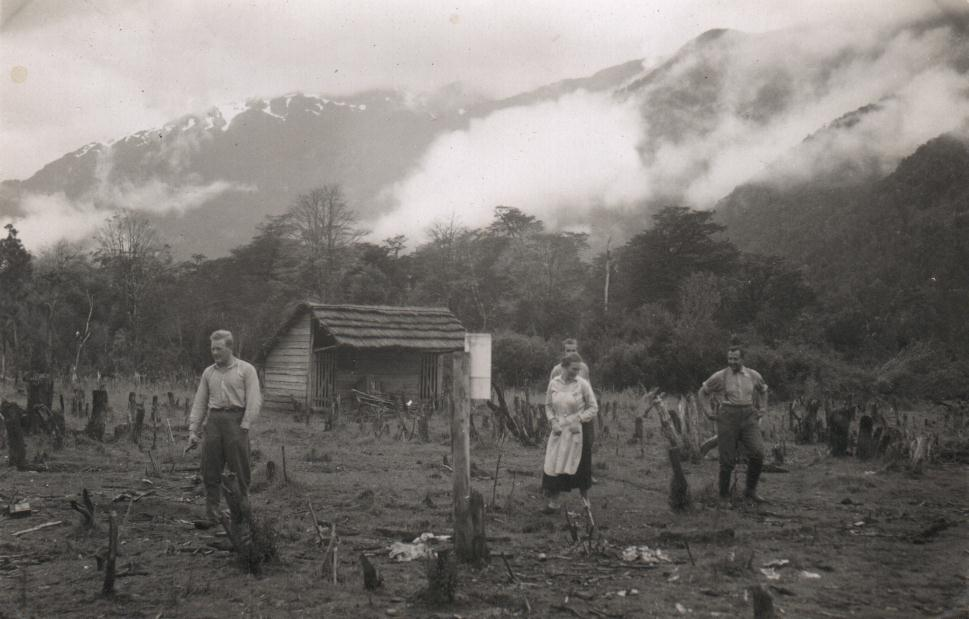
German settlers in Aysén Region in the 1930s.

Subsequently, a new wave of German immigrants arrived in Chile, with many settling in Temuco, and Santiago. Many founded businesses; for example, Horst Paulmann's small store in the capital of the Araucanía Region grew into Cencosud, one of the largest businesses in the region.

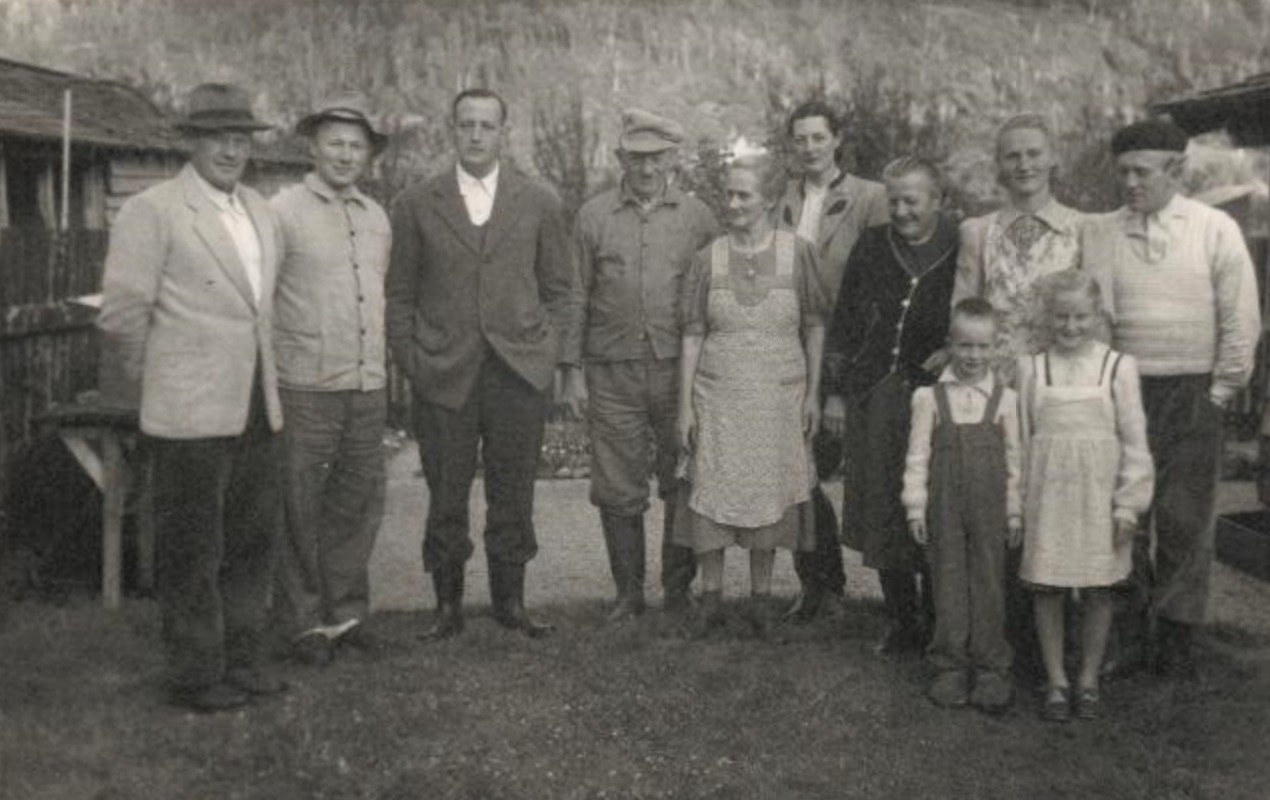
German settlers in Aysén Region in 1951.

Even before the Nazi takeover of Germany in 1933, a German Chilean youth organization was established with strong Nazi influence. Nazi Germany pursued a policy of Nazification of the German Chilean community. These communities and their organizations were considered a cornerstone to extend the Nazi ideology across the world by Nazi Germany. Many German Chileans were passive supporters of Nazi Germany. Nazism was supported by some in the German Lutheran Church hierarchy in Chile. A local chapter of the Nazi Party was started in Chile.

During World War II, many German Jews fled to Chile before and during the Holocaust. For example, the families of Mario Kreutzberger and Tomás Hirsch came to Chile during this time.

Shortly after World War II, former members of Nazi Germany tried to take refuge in South America, including Chile, fleeing trials against them in Europe and elsewhere. Among these was SS Standartenführer and war criminal Walter Rauff. Paul Schäfer, a former army medic, founded Colonia Dignidad, a German enclave in the Maule Region, in which abuses against human rights were allegedly carried out. The precise number of Nazi refugees hidden in Chile after WWII remains unknown.

== The terminology “German-Chileans” and “Chilean-Germans” ==
The criterion for belonging to the German-Chilean or Chilean-German group is not one of nationality, but purely linguistic and cultural. German ancestors came from various regions of the German-speaking area of Central Europe. Therefore, the descendants of Austrians and German-Swiss people (read Swiss Chilean) and German Italians (Italian citizens of German descent and speak German language), among others, are also counted among this minority.

The terms "Chilean Germans" and "German Chileans" generally refer to different groups that differ from one another in terms of their degree of integration. The term "Chilean Germans" is mostly used for Germans living abroad who themselves emigrated to Chile and usually still retain their former nationality. "German Chileans," on the other hand, are Chileans of German origin who hold Chilean citizenship —sometimes in addition to German or Austrian—and whose ancestors have lived in Chile for several generations; many of them have learned German only as a foreign language, whether second or third language.

== German Chileans today ==
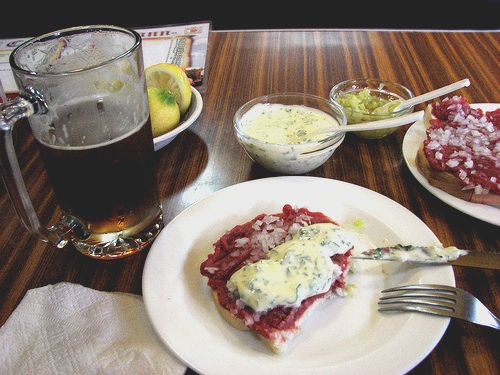
Raw beef crudos are considered a typical German-Chilean dish similar to the German mett. The one in picture are from Café Hausmann in Valdivia.

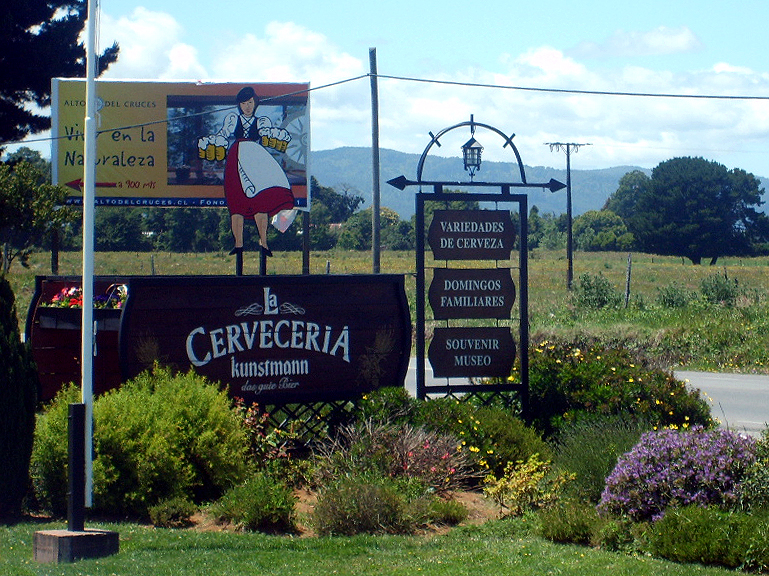
Entrance to the Kunstmann Brewery and restaurant in Valdivia, Chile

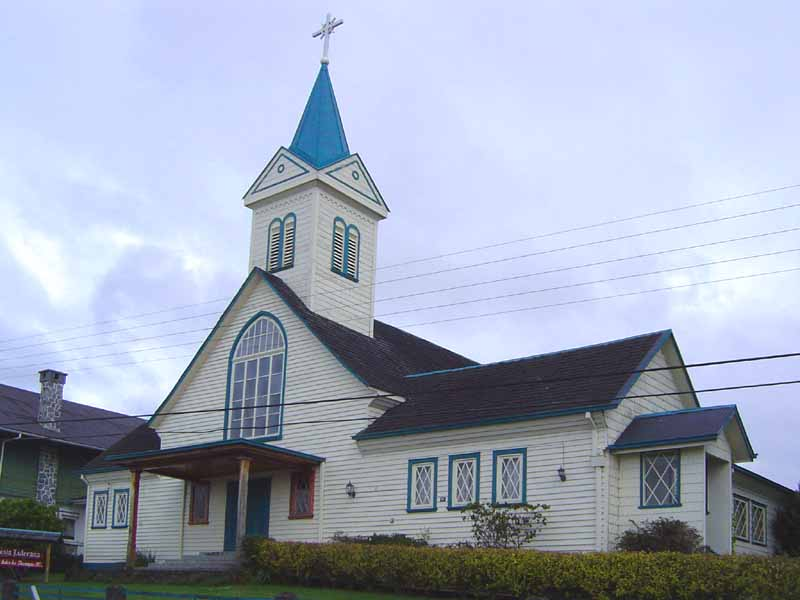
German Lutheran church in Frutillar, Chile

The exact number of Chileans of German descent is unknown but one source puts the number at about 500,000, living mostly in the central and southern portions of the country. According to the last census, there were 8,000 German citizens living in Chile.

An estimated 20,000 Chileans speak the German language. There are also German schools and German-language newspapers and periodicals in Chile (e.g., Cóndor – a weekly German-language newspaper).

=== Education ===
German schools:

- Deutsche Schule Sankt Thomas Morus Santiago
- Deutsche Schule Santiago
- Deutsche Schule Concepción
- Deutsche Schule Valdivia
- Deutsche Schule Valparaiso

Historic German schools:

- Deutsche Schule Chillán
- Deutsche Schule Frutillar
- Deutsche Schule La Serena
- Deutsche Schule La Unión
- Deutsche Schule Los Ángeles
- Deutsche Schule Osorno
- Deutsche Schule Puerto Montt
- Deutsche Schule Puerto Varas
- Deutsche Schule Punta Arenas
- Deutsche Schule San Felipe
- Deutsche Schule Temuco
- Deutsche Schule Villarrica
- Deutsche Schule Los Leones und Wilh.-v.-Humboldt-Seminar für Lehrer und Kindergärtnerinnen
- Colegio Chileno-Aleman de Macul
- Liceo Aleman (Santiago)
- Colegio Santa Ursula (Santiago)
- Instituto Santa Maria (Santiago)
- Colegio Mariano (Santiago)
- Deutsche Marienschule Santiago-La Florida
- Deutsche Schule Santiago-Nuñoa
- Deutsche Schule Ancud-Chiloe
- Instituto Aleman Frutillar
- Deutsche Schule Gorbea
- Deutsche Schule Llanquihue
- Escuela Aleman Huefel-Comuy (Paja-Maisan)
- Deutsche Schule Paillaco
- Deutsche Schule Pucon
- Colegio Aleman Purranque
- Colegio Aleman Quilpe
- Colegio Aleman Tomé
- Deutsche Schule Traiguen
- Deutsches Internat Villa Alemana
- Deutsche Schule Viña del Mar

== Notable German Chileans ==
- Anton Reisenegger, founding member of the bands pentagram and criminal
- Christiane Endler, professional football athlete
- Marlene Ahrens, Olympic athlete, the first Chilean woman to have won an Olympic medal.
- Ena von Baer, ex-minister, political scientist and senator.
- Bastián Bodenhöfer, Chilean actor.
- Miranda Bodenhöfer, Chilean ballet dancer and actress.
- Claudio Bunster, scientist, theoretical physicist, won the Chilean National Science Award in 1995, and contributed to the foundation of the Centro de Estudios Científicos (Center for Scientific Studies) in Valdivia.
- Don Francisco (television host), Chilean television host.
- Otto Dörr Zegers, psychiatrist, intellectual and writer, translated the work of Rainer Maria Rilke into Spanish.
- Julián Elfenbein, Chilean journalist, radio broadcaster and television presenter.
- Nina Frick Asenjo, classical pianist.
- Rodrigo Goldberg, Chilean former international football player.
- Óscar Hahn, poet, former faculty at the University of Iowa, and 2012 winner of the Chilean National Award of Literature.
- Rodrigo Hinzpeter, Chilean lawyer and politician.
- Tomás Hirsch, Chilean politician and businessman.
- Sali Hochschild, German-born Chilean businessman, the founder of Compania Minera y Comercial Sali Hochschild S.A.
- Adriana Hoffmann, Chilean botanist, environmentalist and author.
- Klaus Junge, chess master.
- José Antonio Kast Rist, current President of Chile.
- Felipe Kast Sommerhoff, founder of the Political Evolution Party.
- Fernando Matthei, former commander of the Chilean Air Force. Member of the military junta that ruled Chile, Matthei was the first to admit that the regime had lost the referendum to elect Pinochet in 1988. One of his children, Evelyn Matthei was a candidate in the presidential elections of 2013.
- Manfred Max Neef, economist and academic, winner of the Right Livelihood Award in 1982.
- Joaquín Niemann, Chilean professional golfer.
- Julio Numhauser, Chilean musician of the Nueva Canción-movement.
- Diego Paulsen, politician, member of the Chamber of Deputies of Chile.
- Alfredo Perl, Chilean-German classical pianist, conductor of the Detmold Chamber Orchestra, Germany.
- Raúl Rettig Guissen, politician, chairman of the Rettig Report, documenting human rights abuses and disappearances during the dictatorship of Augusto Pinochet.
- Denise Rosenthal, Chilean singer and songwriter.
- Claudio Spies, Chilean-American composer.
- Chris Watson, third prime minister of Australia.
- José Weinstein, Chilean politician, sociologist and scholar who served as President of the National Council of Culture and the Arts during Ricardo Lagos' government (2000−2006).
- Egon Wolff, Chilean playwright, author and faculty member of the Pontifical Catholic University of Chile. His work has been produced in 29 countries and translated into 19 different languages.
- Allison Göhler, meteorologist and part-time TV host
- Carlo von Mühlenbrock, famous chef
- Jenny Pérez Schmidt, veteran journalist and host in DW Español
- Karin Ebensperger, veteran journalist & host of CNN Chile, daughter of Marlene Ahrens
- Marlén Eguiguren, veteran journalist & host of CNN Chile, daughter of Karin Ebensperger & granddaughter of Marlene Ahrens
- Beatriz Hevia, public official and politician
- Guillermo Kuschel, entomologist
- Eyal Meyer, actor and Kalaripayattu instructor

=== First generation immigrants ===
- Carlos Anwandter, 19th-century settler, helped developing the city of Valdivia.
- Juan Brüggen Messtorff, contributed to the development of geology in Chile.
- Hermann Eberhard, explorer, founder of the first settlements in western Patagonia and discoverer of the Giant sloth fossils at Cueva del Milodón Natural Monument in Chile.
- Emil Körner, German-born Chilean army commander, veteran of the Austro-Prussian War and the Franco-Prussian War, invited by the Chilean government to retrain the Chilean Army in the German military doctrine in 1900, and commander-in-chief of the Chilean Army during the Chilean Civil War.
- Rodolfo Armando Philippi, naturalist, director of the Chilean National Museum of Natural History and founder of the first Chilean Botanical Garden.
- Max Westenhöfer, scientist, physician and pathologist; disciple of Rudolf Virchow. Westenhöfer is considered the founder of Chilean anatomic pathology and social medicine.
- Otto von Moltke, German-Danish military officer who fought in the Franco-Prussian War and, after immigrating to Chile, in the War of the Pacific. He was killed in the last war.
- Michael Kast, businessman, veteran of the Eastern Front of the Second World War and founder of the prominent Kast family.

== Religious affiliations ==
Many Germans who migrated to Chile practice Roman Catholicism, but also Lutheranism and Judaism. It is claimed many Roman Catholics now attend Lutheran churches; however, they would no longer be Roman Catholics, so this claim is false.

== See also ==
- Chile–Germany relations
- German influence in Chile
- List of Chileans of German descent
- Swiss Chilean
- Genealogy of German Chileans in Genealog.cl
