= List of Chileans of German descent =

== German Chileans ==
=== Political figures ===
- Ingrid Antonijevic Hahn, Minister of Economy (2006), academic, businesswoman
- Ena von Baer, Independent Democratic Union politician, Minister General Secretary of Government under Pinera government and academic
- Edgardo Enríquez Frödden, Minister of Education (1973), naval officer, physician, academic
- Carlos Frödden Lorenzen, politician, naval officer
- Tomás Hirsch, Humanist Party politician and businessman
- Miguel Kast, Former Minister of Odeplan (1978–1980) and Labour (1980–1982), and President of the Central Bank (1982)
- Carlos Keller, philosopher, politician
- Alejandra Krauss, Christian Democratic Party politician
- Jorge González von Marées, fascist politician
- Ricardo Lagos Weber, Party for Democracy politician, former Minister of
- Evelyn Matthei, UDI politician, Minister of Labour (2011–) and former Senator
- Raúl Rettig, Radical Party politician and jurist
- Gonzalo Winter, lawyer and Broad Front politician

=== Military and police ===
- René Schneider Commander in chief of the Chilean Army killed in 1970
- Rodolfo Stange Former Chief of the Police Force (Carabineros)
- Fernando Matthei Aubel, Frm. General, Air Force Chief

=== Academics, scientists and writers ===
- Erik Bongcam-Rudloff, bioinformatician
- Juan Brüggen Messtorff, geologist, author
- Claudio Bunster Weitzman scientist
- Claudio Grossman, lawyer, law professor
- Cristián Huneeus, essayist and writer
- Pablo Huneeus, sociologist and writer
- Marcela Paz, writer
- Miguel Kast, Economist
- Mathias Klotz, architect
- Rodolfo Armando Philippi, paleontologist and zoologist
- Max Westenhöfer, scientist, pathologist and biologist
- Teodoro Schmidt, engineer and topographer

=== Artists ===
- Sigrid Alegría Conrads, actress
- Gustavo Becerra-Schmidt, composer, academic
- Guillermo Deisler, stage designer and visual poet
- Óscar Hahn writer and poet
- Hans Helfritz, composer, photographer
- Patricio Manns, composer, poet, writer and journalist
- Gloria Münchmeyer, actress
- Denise Rosenthal, actress and singer
- Antonia Zegers, actress

=== Television and Media ===
- Karen Doggenweiler TV hostess, journalist
- Margot Kahl TV hostess, journalist
- Cecilia Bolocco Fonck TV hostess, model, Miss Universe 1987
- Diana Bolocco Fonck TV hostess, journalist
- Mario Kreutzberger TV personality
- Pablo Mackenna Dörr, TV host, poet, writer

=== Sports people ===
- Marlene Ahrens athlete
- Kristel Köbrich, Chilean swimmer, 2008 Beijing Olympics
- Sebastián Keitel athlete
- Alex Von Schwedler soccer player
- Christiane Endler soccer player
- Rainer Wirth footballer
- Hans Gildemeister Former Tennis Player
- Felipe Aguilar Schuller PGA European Tour golfer
- Gert Weil
- Joaquín Niemann PGA Tour golfer

=== Others ===
- Carlos Anwandter Immigrant, one of the pioneers of the colonization
- Uranía Haltenhoff Model and Miss Chile
- Rosa Markmann former First Lady of Chile
- Paul Schäfer founder of Colonia Dignidad
- María Teresa Stange model

== See also ==
- German Chilean
- Basque Chilean
- British Chilean
- Croatian Chilean
- Ethnic German
- French Chilean
- Italian Chilean
