= Ricardo Martín Díaz =

Chilean lawyer, who served as senator

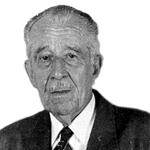

Appointed Senator
- In office 11 March 1990 – 11 March 1998

Personal details
- Born: 8 October 1913 Valparaíso, Chile
- Died: 13 March 2005 (aged 91) Santiago, Chile
- Spouse: Adela Illanes
- Children: Four
- Education: University of Chile (LL.B)
- Profession: Lawyer

Ricardo Martín Díaz (born 8 October 1913 – 13 March 2005) was a Chilean lawyer, who served as senator.

== Biography ==
He was born in Valparaíso on 8 October 1911, the son of Eduardo and María. He married Adelina Illanes Fierro and had four children. He died in Santiago on 13 March 2005.

He was a member of the Lions Club of La Reina.

== Professional career ==
He completed his primary and secondary education at the Sacred Hearts School of Valparaíso and pursued his university studies at the Faculty of Law of the University of Chile, obtaining a degree in Legal and Social Sciences. His graduation thesis was entitled “Land Transport Contract”. He was admitted to the bar in 1935.

He began his judicial career in 1936 as Secretary of the Court of Minor Jurisdiction of Lota and later served as judge of the same court between 1937 and 1938.

Between 1939 and 1946, he served as Judge of Letters in the commune of Florida, Concepción. He was subsequently appointed Clerk —Relator— of the Court of Appeals of Concepción until 1948, when he also served as assistant professor of Introduction to Law at the Faculty of Law of the Pontifical Catholic University of Chile. He additionally taught Civic Education and Political Economy at Colegio María Inmaculada.

He later moved to Santiago, where he served as Clerk of the Court of Appeals of Santiago until 1953 and of the Supreme Court of Chile until 1958. That same year, he was appointed Justice of the Court of Appeals of Santiago.

The consolidation of his judicial career occurred in 1964, when he was appointed Justice of the Supreme Court of Chile, a position he held until 1971. He later served as associate justice ―abogado integrante― of that court, resigning from the position on 5 January 1990.

=== Political career ===
On 9 June 1986, he was appointed a member of the Advisory Commission for the study, drafting, and preparation of a bill on the Organic Constitutional Law on the organization of the Judicial Branch.

Between 25 June 1986 and 1989, he served on the Advisory Commission of the Minister of the Interior on matters related to terrorist acts, unlawful coercion, and arbitrary detentions occurring during the period of validity of the decree that created the commission.

On 27 December 1989, in accordance with Article 45 of the Constitution then in force, he was appointed Institutional Senator in his capacity as former Justice of the Supreme Court, for the 1990–1998 term. For the same period, former Supreme Court Justice Carlos Letelier Bobadilla was also appointed.

On 25 April 1990, President Patricio Aylwin appointed him as a member of the National Commission for Truth and Reconciliation.
