= Tala Canta Ilabe =

Inca governor of Collasuyo

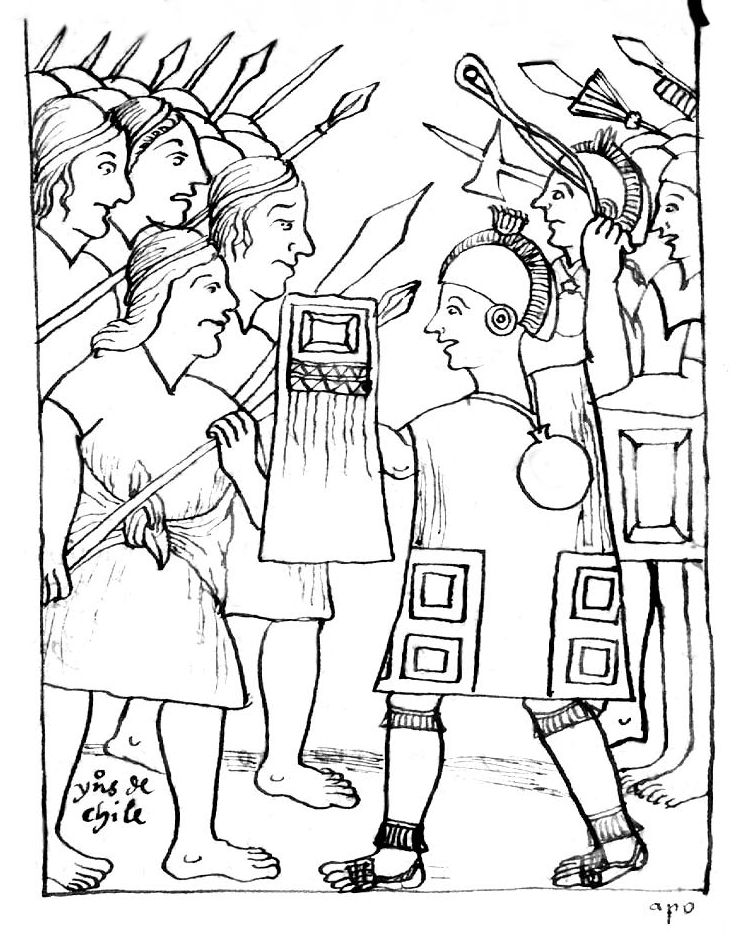
- Appointed by: Mitimae
- Constituency: Collasuyo
- Nickname: Cacique don Bartolomé de Talagante

Tala Canta Ilabe (in quechua: Tala Canta, or Sorcerer's Lasso; Tala: Lasso; Canta: Sorcerer) was an Inca governor for a zone in Collasuyo, corresponding to the ayllu where Talagante is currently located, near Santiago de Chile. Quilicanta, the Inca governor of Collasuyo who was assassinated by Inés de Suárez, was also from the same panaka as Tala Canta IIabe.

He was the great-great-grandfather of Catalina de los Ríos y Lísperguer, «la Quintrala».

The toponym "Talagante" is derived from his name.

== Biography ==
In 1430, the Inca Túpac Yupanqui undertook a great military campaign that culminated in the establishment of a true border on the Maule River. His son, Tala Canta Ilabe, a nobleman of the Hurin Cusco lineage (same lineage as Cápac Yupanqui) commanded the imperial forces that settled in the Llollehue valley, between the Maipo and Mapocho rivers, and decided to found a mitma and a pukara.

=== Creation of the Ayllu ===
It was Tala Canta who gave the name to the land which would later become the current Talagante, a Spanish deformation of the Quechua word Talakanta. Tala Canta Ilabe had the authority to appoint kurakas or governors, at the same time that it depended on the Inca of Cuzco. The fruition of his mandate was due to his ability to establish the social, political and economic systems characteristic of the Inca Empire: distribute the land, the community property and begin the construction of works for the common good, such as roads, barns to preserve the fruits of the crops and the construction of houses. Agricultural and livestock production became so developed that it was possible for food to be sent to the pukaras located to the north. He was the last ruler to celebrate the Inti Raymi in Chile, a religious festival in honor of the Sun held on the winter solstice. The ceremonies were carried out in the huaca de Chena, located in the current Calera de Tango, and were abolished after the arrival of the Spanish.

In its mitmas, there was an obraje, or textile factory, formerly called paños de la tierra and today sayal (sackcloth), on behalf of the emperors of Cuzco. Tala Canta was probably the director of that work.

=== Spanish Conquest ===
Once he founded the capital of the Kingdom of Chile in Santiago de Chile, Pedro de Valdivia needed to provide himself with wood for a multitude of uses. He commissioned Bartolomé Blumenthal to look for it, since he was a builder carpenter, along with being one of the company's financiers.

In his search, Blumenthal came to the lands of the Inca Tala Canta Ilabe, with whom he had an excellent understanding. It was there that he was not only able to obtain the wood he was looking for, but also workers for the construction projects in Santiago, as well as fabrics and clay pots that astonished him with their quality. Furthermore, he obtained Tala Canta's consent to marry one of his granddaughters. The family of the cacique, already called Talagante by the Spanish, converted to Christianity and Blumenthal's girlfriend was baptized with the name Elvira, becoming the cacica Elvira de Talagante. In 1555, Blumenthal Hispanicized his name, becoming simply Bartolomé Flores. His daughter with Elvira was baptized with the name of Águeda Flores, grandmother of Catalina de los Ríos y Lisperguer, nicknamed «la Quintrala».

=== Archaeological findings ===
The presence of the Inca culture in Talagante was fully verified in 1997, during the construction of the toll plaza in Talagante on the Autopista del Sol. Five tombs were found, where 30 ceramic vessels with typical Inca shapes and decoration were also found. In addition to a tupu (metal pin) and the bones corresponding to five individuals.

== See also ==
- Catalina de los Ríos y Lisperguer
