= Pedro de Lisperguer =

Pedro de Lisperguer von Wittenberg y Bírlinguer (born Peter Lißberg; 1535–1604) was a German conquistador who participated in the Conquest of Chile. He is the patriarch of a highly influential family in Colonial Chile, where he was a part of the colonial aristocracy, holding important positions in administration and the military, and amassing an immense fortune. He arrived to Chile in the 1550s after Emperor Charles V authorized him to depart from Peru. Through his numerous descendants, he established a powerful family clan that wielded extraordinary influence in Chile for nearly two centuries. Catalina de los Ríos y Lisperguer was his granddaughter.

== Life and work ==
=== Background ===
He was born in 1535 in Worms, Germany, and was the son of councilman Peter Birling (born 1503) and his wife, Catarina Lißberg. He had a younger brother named Peter Birling (born 1538). His paternal grandfather was Jacob Birling (born 1475), who was related to the princes of Saxony-Wittenberg.

=== Youth ===
After the Catholic Emperor Charles V defeated a coalition of Protestant princes and cities in the Battle of Mühlberg on the Elbe in April 1547, the Protestant city of Worms was also forced to submit to him. It fell to Peter’s father to declare the city's capitulation. In return, Peter Lißberg was taken into the service of Charles V as a page and from then on was known as Pedro Lisperguer. He later traveled to Spain with Pedro Fernández de Córdoba, 4th Count of Feria, who raised him in his household.

In 1554, Lisperguer accompanied the Duke of Feria on a trip to London to attend the June wedding between Mary I Tudor and the Spaniard Philip II. There, he met Jerónimo de Alderete, the deputy captain general of Chile, who had come to London to present himself to Philip II as the successor to Pedro de Valdivia, the Chilean governor who had fallen in December of the previous year. Alderete’s reports about the development of the colony sparked Lisperguer’s interest in Chile. In mid-October, Philip II recommended Alderete as the new governor of Chile, and Lisperguer decided to accompany him to Chile.

Although at that time non-Spaniards were forbidden, under penalty of death, from entering Spanish territories, Lisperguer managed to obtain a permit to enter Peru and Chile. On November 14, Emperor Charles V issued the necessary document for him in Flanders—a real cédula—explicitly mentioning Lisperguer’s German origins. On October 15, 1555, Lisperguer boarded a ship in Sanlúcar de Barrameda with Alderete as part of the fleet of Andrés Hurtado de Mendoza, the Spanish Viceroy of Peru and Marquis of Cañete. The future writer Alonso de Ercilla accompanied him on this journey. Alderete died during the voyage in Panama in April 1556, and Lisperguer eventually arrived in Lima as a courtier of the viceroy.

=== Conquest in Chile ===
At the time, the so-called Arauco War threatened the very existence of the Chilean colony. Additionally, Francisco de Aguirre and Francisco de Villagrán were vying for the vacant governorship, further destabilizing the colony. To restore control, Viceroy Andrés Hurtado de Mendoza quickly assembled an expedition, appointing his son García Hurtado de Mendoza as governor of Chile and naming Lisperguer as one of his four advisors. Lisperguer was also given command of one of the three galleons in the expedition, signifying his high status at the time. He arrived in Chile on November 22, 1557, bringing along some African slaves.

The new governor arrested Aguirre and Villagrán and ordered their deportation to Peru—a harsh and unpopular decision. Lisperguer was the only one to dare to intercede on their behalf, but the governor, intolerant of dissent, commanded him to escort the two men to Peru and forbade Lisperguer himself from returning to Chile. Upon their arrival in Peru, the viceroy received Lisperguer and his prisoners honorably and welcomed them at court.

Nevertheless, Lisperguer soon returned to Chile and participated in the Arauco campaign. As a ship commander, he delivered reinforcements and supplies to the city of Concepción, which was under siege by the Mapuche. This support allowed the city to endure the siege until further Spanish troops arrived.

In 1560, under orders from the governor, Lisperguer returned to Peru with his ship to procure urgently needed reinforcements for the Arauco War.

=== Conflicts and excommunication ===
On January 27, 1563, during a dispute involving heresy accusations against the conquistador Alonso de Escobar, Lisperguer led a heavily armed group to storm the La Merced Church in Santiago. The group, which included monks, scholars, a bishop, enslaved Africans, and other conquistadors, broke down the church doors, targeting the vicar and inquisitor Antonio de Molina. In retaliation, Molina excommunicated Lisperguer and his accomplices the following day. Despite this, Lisperguer's faction ultimately prevailed, forcing Molina into exile in Peru.

On February 20, 1564, Pedro de Villagra appointed Lisperguer captain of a light cavalry unit. He was granted encomiendas in 1564 and 1565.

=== Inquisition and later career ===
In 1566, Lisperguer faced the Inquisition after claiming that Mary was born through her navel. In October, he was sentenced to abjuración de vehementi, a penalty for suspected heresy, with the threat of execution if he reoffended. As penance, he had to attend Mass as a penitent and deliver approximately 25 kg of cooking oil. After completing his penance, he was sworn in as a member of Santiago’s colonial council (cabildo) on November 6, 1566.

Lisperguer later served as the commander of the Quiapo Fortress (built in 1566) near Lebu and participated in its defense.

On December 13, 1568, he was elected mayor of Santiago by the cabildo, but the Catholic Church contested his appointment, likely due to his previous conviction by the Inquisition.

=== Family and wealth ===
Between 1560 and 1570, Lisperguer married Águeda Flores (1541–1632), the only legitimate daughter of Bartolomé Flores, the wealthiest man in Chile. Águeda’s mother, Elvira Curiqueo, was a Mapuche-Inca noblewoman and the wealthiest woman in Chile. Upon Bartolomé Flores’s death in November 1585, Lisperguer and his wife inherited a vast fortune, including extensive lands between Santiago and Cauquenes, approximately 400 km south. Lisperguer also held encomiendas in northern Patagonia (modern Argentina) and transported Puelche people from there to his estates in Putagán and Cauquenes.

In 1572, Lisperguer became mayor of Santiago.

=== Military and administrative roles ===
He rose to the rank of general and, on January 23, 1576, was appointed witch judge, tasked with persecuting the machis, the shamans of the Mapuche.

Around 1583, while the newly appointed governor Alonso de Sotomayor was en route to Chile, Lisperguer joined a five-member commission to assume interim governance, replacing Ruiz de Gamboa. That same year, Sotomayor rewarded Lisperguer with extensive lands near Lampa, close to Santiago.

Between 1583 and 1585, Lisperguer was sent to Peru for a second time to secure support for the Arauco War. He successfully returned with 200 soldiers and 30,000 gold pesos (equivalent to 14.4 kg of fine gold) worth of military supplies.

=== Final years ===
After completing his mission, Lisperguer remained at the viceroy's court in Lima and never returned to Chile. The reasons for this are unclear. By May 1595, he was reportedly ill and in difficulties. His wife, Águeda, drafted her will and traveled to be with him.

The last known record of Lisperguer is his appointment as gentilhombre de palacio by Viceroy Luis de Velasco on March 22, 1604, in Lima.

Pedro Lisperguer is believed to have died in Lima in 1604 or 1605.

=== Marriage and issue ===
Pedro Lisperguer and his wife Águeda Flores had six sons and three daughters:

- Juan Rodulfo (1556 - 29 September 1606)
- Pedro (born August 1581; married in 1614)
- Bartolomé
- Fadrique
- Federico (died 22 September 1581)
- Mauricio
- Magdalena (married 10 October 1613)
- María (born 1565; married 5 December 1595; had no children)
- Catalina (mother of Catalina de los Ríos y Lisperguer (1602 - 1665), also known as La Quintrala)

The Lisperguers were part of the colonial aristocracy and, during the 16th and 17th centuries, were the most powerful family in Chile. They not only possessed immense wealth but also controlled the three major forces governing the country at the time. They dominated the judiciary through familial ties with judges, influenced the clergy as patrons of monasteries, and commanded the military as leaders and distinguished soldiers.
