= Embassy of Chile, Berlin =

Diplomatic mission of Chile to Germany

Embassy of Chile in Berlin Embajada de Chile en Berlín
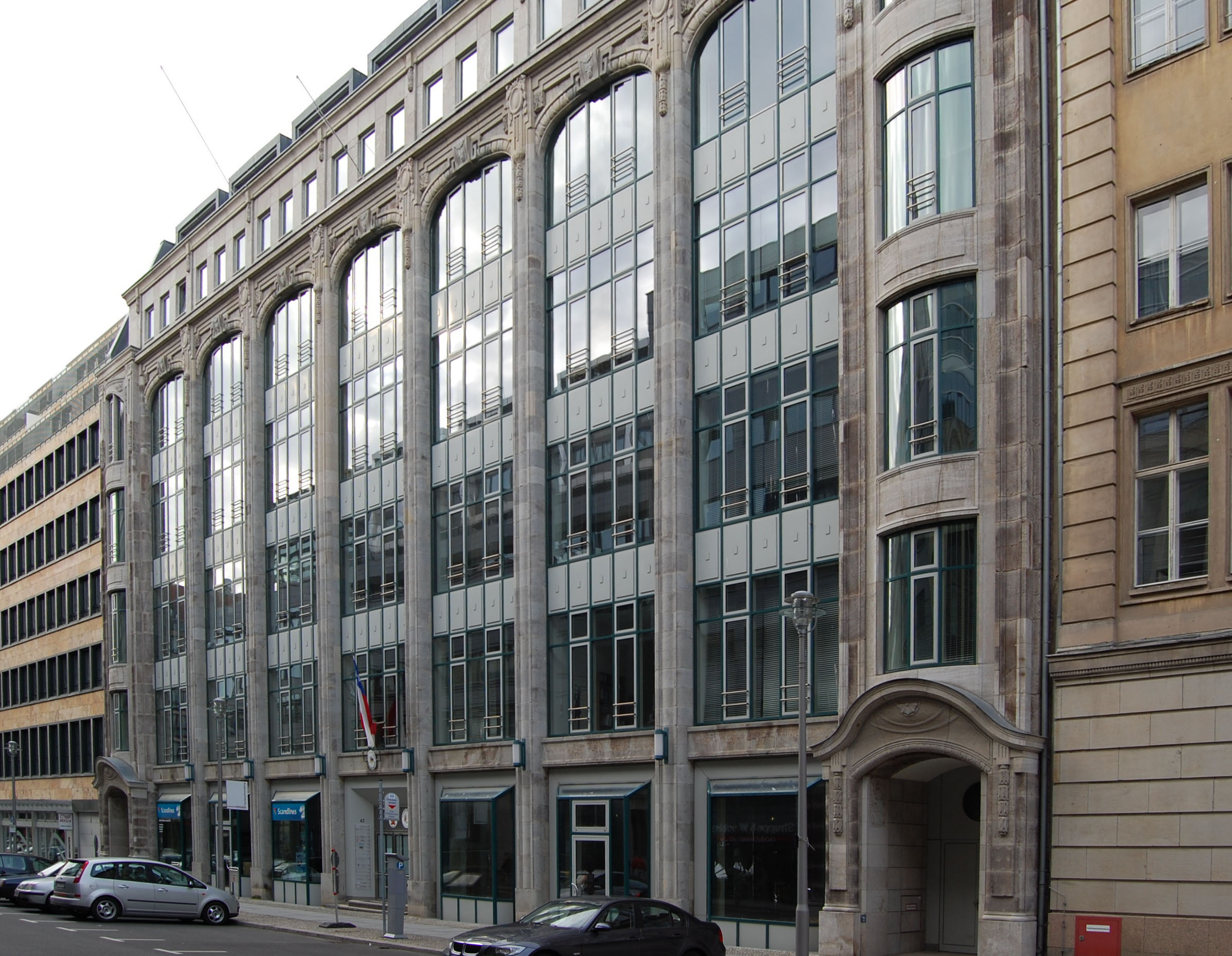
- Embassy in 2008
- Location: Berlin, Germany
- Address: Anton-Wilhelm-Amo-Straße 42, 10117 Berlin, Germany
- Coordinates: 52.512484°N 13.394470°E
- Ambassador: Jorge Sandrockref
- Website: www.echile.de/index.php/de/

The Embassy of Chile, Berlin is the diplomatic mission of Chile to Germany. Chile also has consulates in other parts of Germany, including in Frankfurt, Hamburg and Munich.

== History ==
Diplomatic relations between Chile and Germany were established as early as around 1810 with trade from Hamburg soon after Chile gained independence. Chile and the German Empire established formal relations in 1871 when the German embassy opened in Santiago, and later a Chilean embassy would open in Berlin to, although in 1945 it was closed. In 1952 relations were established with West Germany and in 1971 with East Germany, diplomatic relations with both governments would end in 1973 following the 1973 coup, and wouldn't be re-established until 1990. The embassy of Liechtenstein is also located in the same building.

== See also ==
- Diplomatic missions of Chile
- Diplomatic missions in Germany
- Chile-Germany relations
