= Chile–Germany relations =

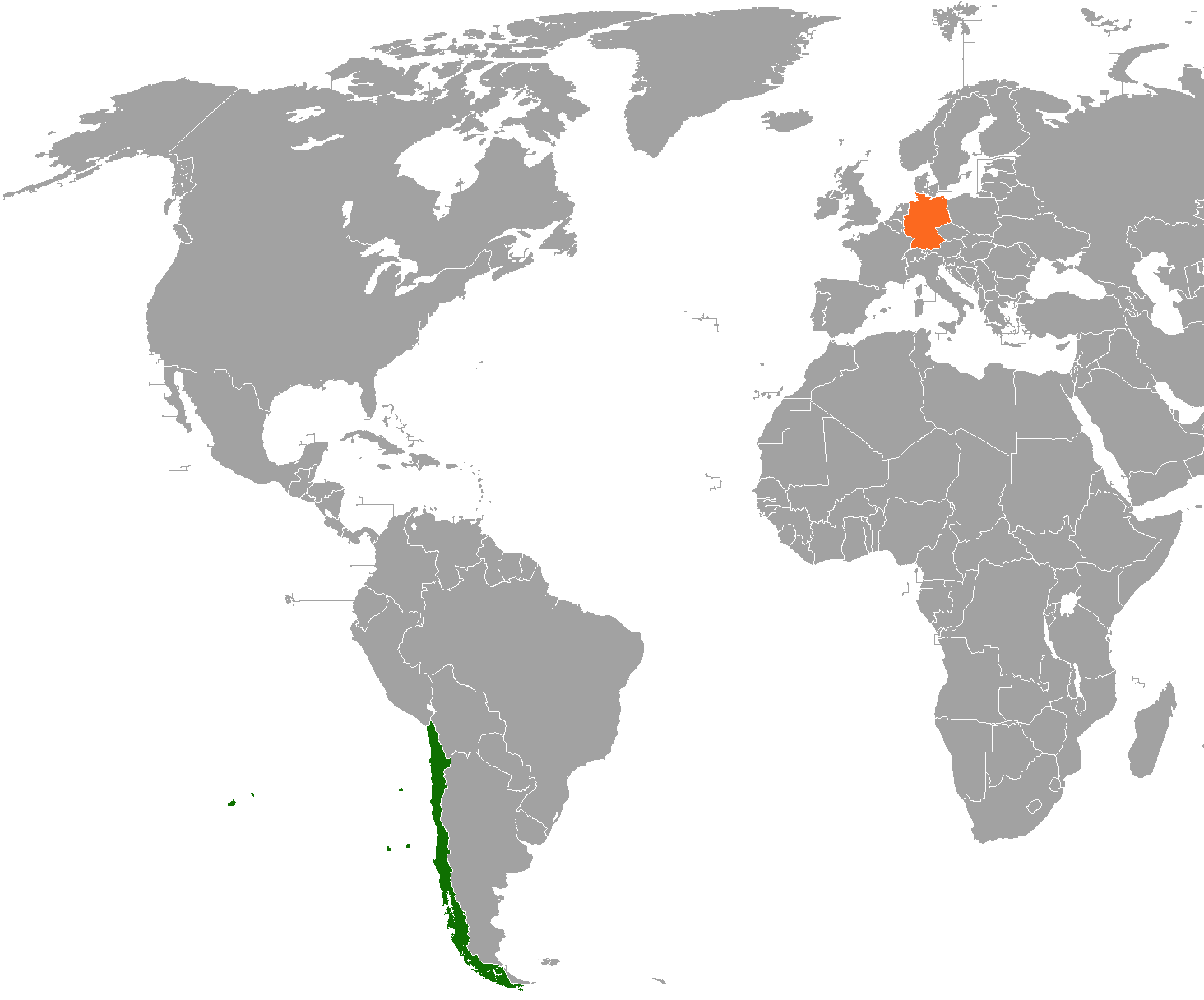

- Chile: Germany

Diplomatic mission
- German Embassy, Santiago de Chile: Chilean Embassy, Berlin

Envoy
- Ambassador Susanne Fries-Gaier: Ambassador Jorge O'Ryan Schutz

Chile–Germany relations are foreign relations between Germany and Chile. During the last 150 years, many Germans have settled in Chile, for several different reasons. Thousands of Chileans sought refuge in Germany during Pinochet's dictatorship.

In 1810, when Chile became independent from Spain, Hamburg traded with Valparaíso. From 1848, as Chile encouraged Germans to emigrate, more and more German settlers arrived in Chile.

== History and immigration ==
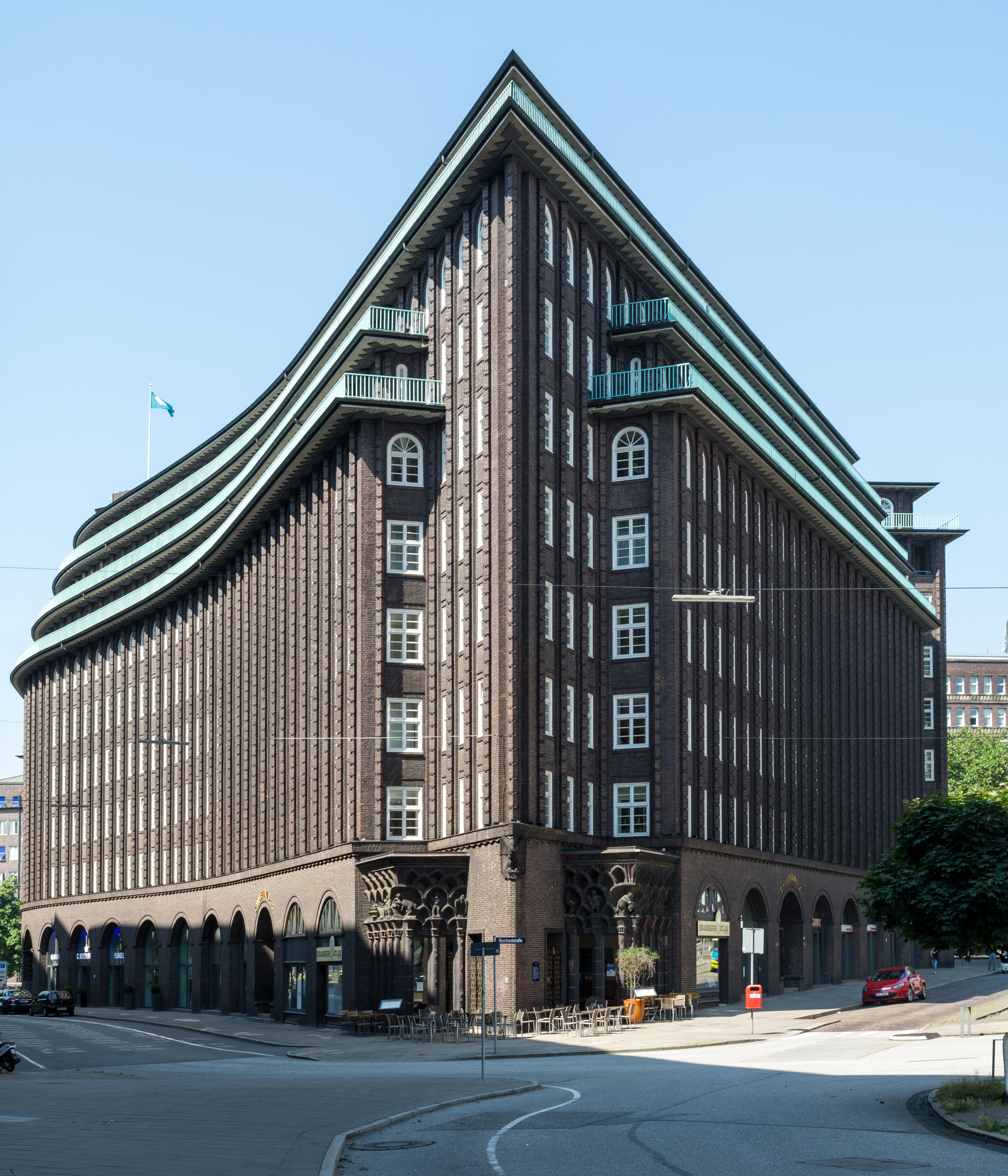
Chilehaus in Hamburg

The origin of the massive immigration of Germans (includes Poles due to Partitions of Poland) to Chile is found in the so-called "Law of Selective Immigration" of 1845. The "law's" objective was to bring middle and upper-class people to colonize regions in the south of Chile, between Valdivia and Puerto Montt. More than 6,000 families arrived in Chile during this period alone.

The German immigrants succeeded in creating vigorous villages and communities in virtually uninhabited regions, completely changing the landscape of the southern zones. In 1851, Carlos Anwandter, a leader of these early German immigrants, expressed the colonists' goals to the Chilean diplomat who invited them, Vicente Pérez Rosales:

We will be Chileans, as honorable and hardworking as ever there were, we will defend our adopted country united in the ranks of our new compatriots, against all foreign oppression and with the resolve and fortitude of the man that defends his country, his family, and his interests.

The prestige of Germany and German culture in Chile remained high after the First World War but did not return to its pre-war levels. Indeed in Chile, the war bought an end to a period of scientific and cultural influence which writer Eduardo de la Barra scornfully called "the German bewitchment" (Spanish: el embrujamiento alemán).

Among Chileans of German descent are the architect Mathias Klotz, tennis players Gabriel Silberstein and Hans Gildemeister, the athletes Sebastián Keitel and Marlene Ahrens, the musicians Patricio Manns, the economist Ernesto Schifelbein, the politicians Miguel Kast and Evelyn Matthei, the entrepreneurs Jürgen Paulmann and Carlos Heller, the actors Gloria Münchmeyer and Antonia Zegers.

Today, the current Chilean migration is made up by students who attend German universities, Chileans whose partners live in Germany, and a temporary migration of professionals who work for German companies.

== Culture ==
German values have influenced Chilean culture and economic development and vice versa. For example,

- Migration of ethnic Germans into Chile from Argentina in the early 20th century.
- The Chilean Army uses the Stahlhelm for ceremonial purposes, while the Chilean Military School still uses the Pickelhaube as part of the ceremonial uniform.
- Chilean medicine was influenced by Dr. Max Westenhöfer (1871–1957), a German scientist, physician and pathologist from the University of Berlin who is considered the founder of anatomic pathology in Chile. Prof. Westenhöfer established permanently in Chile as faculty member of the University of Chile, becoming an important figure in the intellectual Chilean environment.

== Trade ==
Germany is Chile’s principal trading partner within the European Union and continues to rank fifth worldwide among suppliers of Chilean imports. In 2013, Germany exported $3.2bn to Chile and Chile exported $2.1bn in goods to Germany and it is expected that the trade between both nations will continue to increase.

== Resident diplomatic missions ==
- Chile has an embassy in Berlin and consulates-general in Frankfurt, Hamburg and Munich.
- Germany has an embassy in Santiago.
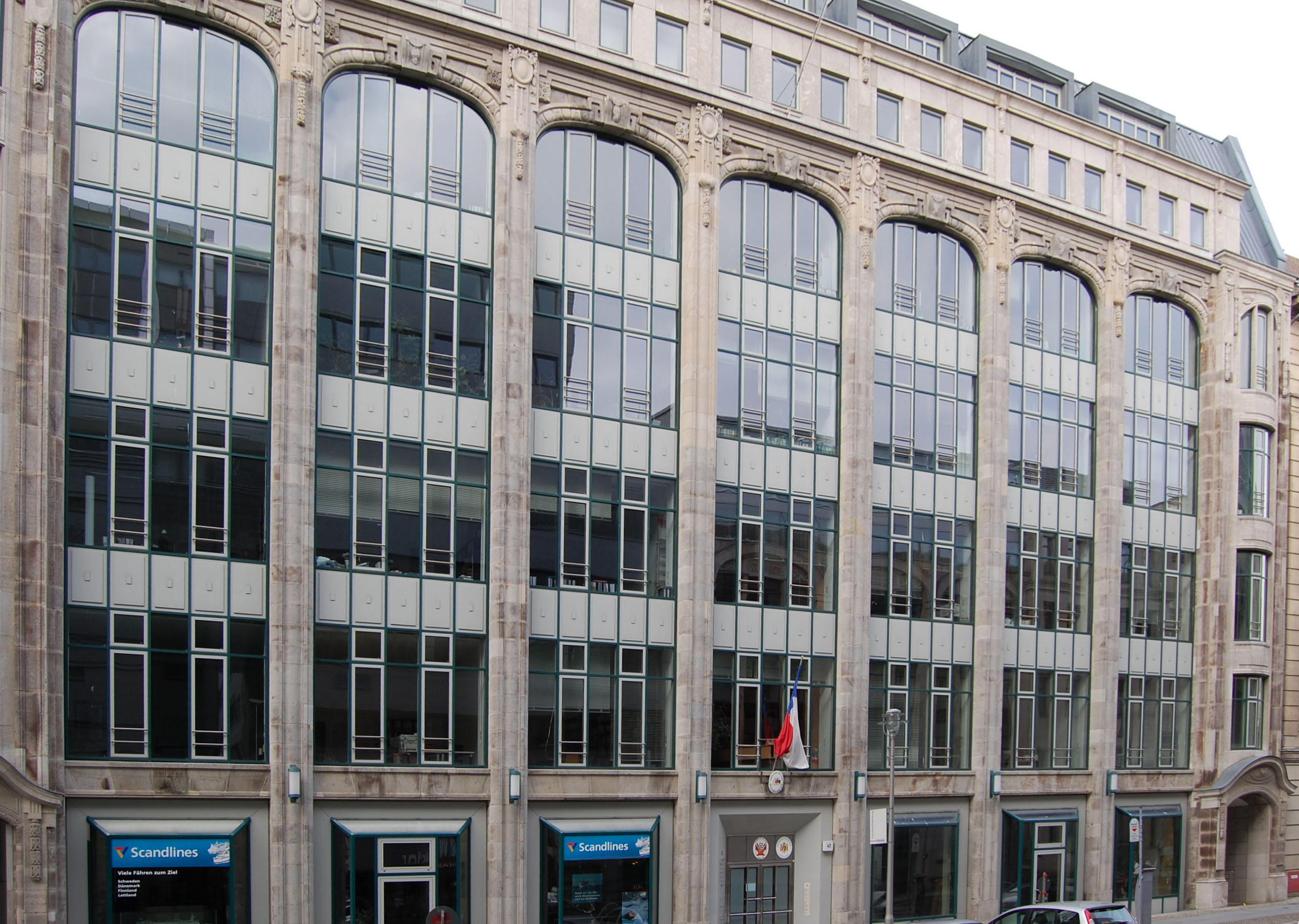
Embassy of Chile in Berlin

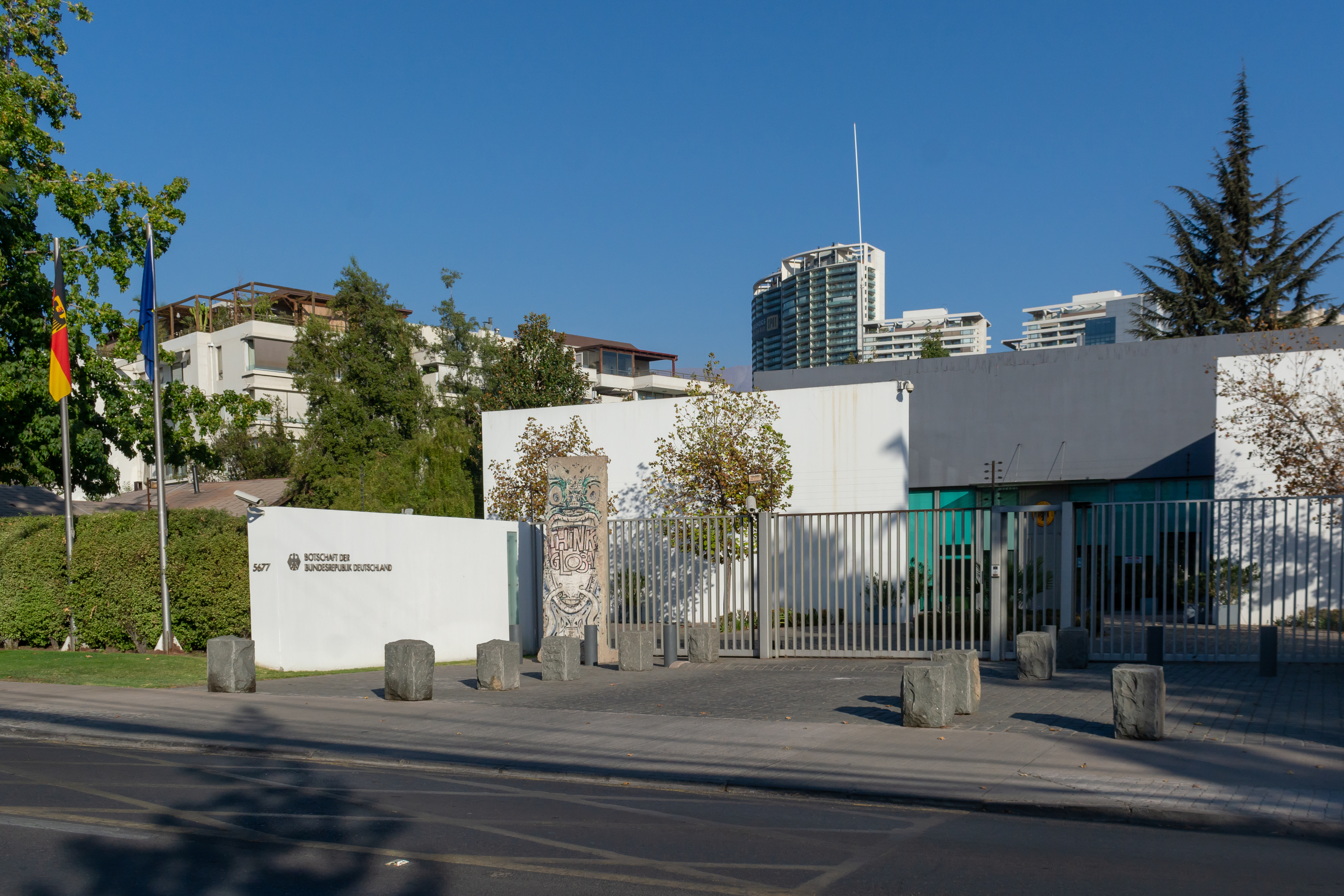
Embassy of Germany in Santiago

== Other ==
A weekly German - Chilean newspaper called "Condor" exists in Germany as well as several fraternities, the so-called "Burschenschaften"

== See also ==
- German Chileans
- German influence in Chile
