= Bartolomé Flores =

Bartolomé Flores (1511 – November 11, 1585) is believed to have been the first German to arrive in Chile. He came with the expedition of Pedro de Valdivia at the beginning of the Spanish conquest of Chile.

== Biography ==
Bartholomew, known in Chile as Bartolomé Flores, was born 1506 or 1511 in the Franconian town of Nuremberg. His parents were John and Agatha. His Spanish family name Flores is a translation of his unknown original name in German. Benjamín Vicuña Mackenna (1877) named him hypothetically Blumen, which is a translation of his Spanish name into German, but does not exist as a surname in German. In his Diccionario Biográfico Colonial de Chile (1906) José Toribio Medina named him Blumenthal, a modern German-Jewish name, without mentioning his source. In Nuremberg at that time there were families named Blum, Blümel or Blümlein.

Bartholomew came about 1528 to America and stayed first in La Española, Santo Domingo and Nicaragua, from where he travelled to Peru, to support Francisco Pizarro. There he got to know Pedro de Valdivia.

Bartolomé travelled together with Valdivia's expedition in the beginning of the conquest of Chile. There he participated in the defense of the settlement of Santiago, when it was attacked by local tribes led by chief Michimalonco on 11 September 1541.

Flores married Elvira, the only daughter of Tala Canta Ilabe, Cacique of Talagante, in Chile. He had two daughters: Barbola, who married Captains Francisco de Urbina and Hernández Gallegos and; Águeda, who married Captain Pedro de Lisperguer and is the grandmother of Catalina de los Ríos y Lisperguer, called La Quintrala.

Flores made his will in Santiago on 11 November 1585, and died that year in Talagante. Some claim that he died while on the voyage to discover the Solomon Islands.

== See also ==
- German-Chilean
