= Deutsche Schule Santiago =

- The school in 2024

Location
- Santiago de Chile; Chile; 33.39856°S 70.56902°W

Information
- Type: German international school
- Opened: March 3, 1891
- Superintendent: Jorge Cataldo
- Grades: Preschool-12
- Website: www.dsstgo.cl

Deutsche Schule Santiago (DS; Spanish: Colegio Alemán de Santiago) is a German international school in Santiago. Years 7 through 12 and the school administration are at the Las Condes campus. Years one through six are at the Vitacura Campus. Preschool classes are held at the Cerro Colorado campus in Las Condes.

The first classes were held on March 3, 1891.

== See also ==
- German Chileans
