= Jaime Castillo Velasco =

Chilean politician (1914–2003)

Minister of Lands and Colonization
- In office 16 December 1965 – 23 May 1967
- President: Eduardo Frei Montalva
- Preceded by: Hugo Trivelli
- Succeeded by: Hugo Trivelli

Personal details
- Born: 14 March 1914
- Died: 29 October 2003 (aged 89)
- Party: Christian Democrat Party

Jaime Castillo Velasco (Spanish pronunciation: [ˈxajme kasˈtiʝo βeˈlasko]; 14 March 1914 – 29 October 2003) was a Chilean politician who served as president and vice-president of the Christian Democrat Party on several occasions.

== Early life ==
Born in Santiago, he studied at the Liceo Alemán before progressing to a law degree at the University of Chile, from where he graduated in 1935. He became a lawyer, in 1939, after he finished his studies at Pontifical Catholic University of Chile. He later studied philosophy at both the University of Chile and the Sorbonne in Paris.

== Career ==
During the government of Eduardo Frei Montalva, Jaime Castillo was appointed to serve as the Minister of Land and Human Settlement and, later, as Minister of Justice (1966 to 1968).

He was a professor at the University of Chile and the Catholic University, School of Political Science; directed the policy and Spirit magazine; chaired the Institute of Political Studies and Training (IDEP), was a member of the World Ideological Commission of the Christian Democrats and the founder and director of the Latin American Secretariat of Human Rights. In the 1990s under the government of Eduardo Frei Ruiz-Tagle, Jaime Castillo was the director of La Nación.

He was forced into exile in Caracas following the coup d'état of 11 September 1973 that overthrew President Salvador Allende. That did not prevent him, however, from founding the Chilean Human Rights Commission (Comisión Chilena de Derechos Humanos) in 1978, an agency that worked to defend human rights during the de facto government of General Augusto Pinochet. In that capacity, he defended several human rights cases, including cases involving Chilean exiles or the murder of Orlando Letelier. In August 1976 Castillo Velasco and Eugenio Velasco Letelier, were accused of posing a threat to "national security" and were expelled to Buenos Aires. While in exile he tried a few times to return to his country but the Junta did not allow him.

Following the restoration of democracy, President Patricio Aylwin appointed him to the National Truth and Reconciliation Commission (the "Rettig Commission"), which, on 9 February 1991, published the Rettig Report, analysing the human rights violations committed during the military regime.

In the last years of her life to preside over the Chilean Institute of Humanistic Studies (ICHEH) reflection of social organization-Christian stream (linked to the Christian Democratic Party), between 2000 and 2003.

== Awards ==
He received several decorations from the governments of Venezuela and France. In 1999, he was handed the award for Meritorious Service of the Republic of Chile.

== Personal life ==
He was married to Mercedes Zavala Parga, had no children. His father was poet and lawyer Eduardo Castillo Urízar and his mother was Elena Velasco. His brother was Fernando Castillo Velasco, mayor of the Municipality of La Reina.

== Publications ==
- En defensa de Maritain (Santiago, Editorial del Pacífico 1949)
- El problema comunista (Santiago, Editorial del Pacífico, 1955)
- Las fuentes de la Democracia Cristiana (Santiago, Editorial del Pacífico, 1968)
- Los caminos de la revolución (Santiago, Editorial del Pacífico, 1972)
- Teoría y práctica de la Democracia Cristiana (Santiago, Editorial del Pacífico, 1973)
- Democracia y Derechos Humanos (Santiago, Icheh, 1986)
- El humanismo integral de Jaques Maritain (Santiago, Icheh, 1987)
- Violencia y Derechos Humanos (Santiago, Icheh, 1993)
- ¿Hubo en Chile violaciones a los Derechos Humanos? Comentarios a las memorias del General Pinochet (Santiago, Icheh, 1995)
- La teoría de la abstracción en el empirismo inglés (Santiago, Rumbos, 1999)

== Sources ==
The earliest version of this article was translated, with minor modifications, from the corresponding article on the Spanish-language Wikipedia.
