= Cóndor (newspaper) =

German-language newspaper published in Chile

Cóndor is a weekly German-language newspaper published in Santiago, Chile. The scope of the publication focuses on matters of interest to the German Chilean community.

== History ==
Cóndor was founded in 1938, the result of a merger of several previously existing newspapers in German language in Chile, including the former Deutsche Nachrichten which was founded in 1870. Presented in a tabloid format, it goes print every Friday and can be obtained across the country, primarily in the central and southern regions. The paper includes articles and interviews on domestic matters, as well as news from Germany and Europe.

Since its founding, Cóndor has undergone various changes. Early editions were printed as 72-page semi-weekly magazines. From 1951 it was resized to its present format and was printed twice a week—Wednesdays and Saturdays, though space was cut down to twelve pages. In August 1995, the publication was revamped with the help of German journalists and leaders of the German Chilean community. Currently, the paper is allotted 16 pages.

Among the staff of Cóndor are included respected arts and music critics such as Pedro Labowitz and Daniel Quiroga and the economic journalist Iván Witker.
