= Detmold Chamber Orchestra =

The Detmolder Kammerorchester (Detmold Chamber Orchestra) is a German chamber orchestra based in Detmold. The current music director is German-Chilean pianist Alfredo Perl. The primary concert venue of the orchestra is the Konzerthaus Detmold. Eckhard Fischer formed the ensemble in 1989, from musicians of the Hochschule für Musik Detmold. Christoph Poppen was the first director of the orchestra, starting in 1989. Fischer took over the artistic directorship of the ensemble in 1996.

The orchestra receives funding from the Ministerium für Städtebau und Wohnen, Kultur und Sport (Ministry of Urban Design and Housing, Culture and Sport) and the City of Detmold.

In addition to concerts in Detmold, the orchestra performs in other German cities such as Eckernförde, Emden, Extertal, Gütersloh, Kleve, Rinteln, Waldshut, Würzburg and Zweibrücken.
