= Águeda Flores =

Ágatha Blumenthal, also known by the Spanish name Águeda Flores (1541, Talagante – Santiago, August 1632), was a mixed-race Chilean landowner, daughter of Bartolomé Blumenthal and the Inca Princess Elvira of Talagante (daughter of the respected chief Tala Canta Ilabe) and grandmother to Catalina de los Ríos y Lisperguer (La Quintrala).

Águeda owned large portions of land in Talagante, Quilicura, Peñalolén, Cauquenes and Putagán, making her the richest woman of the colonial period in Chile.

== See also ==
- Elvira de Talagante
- Bartolomé Blumenthal
- Bartholomeus Blumenthal Welzer (Bartolomé Flores in Spanish) accompanied Pedro de Valdivia in the Conquest of Chile.
