= Alfredo Perl =

Chilean pianist

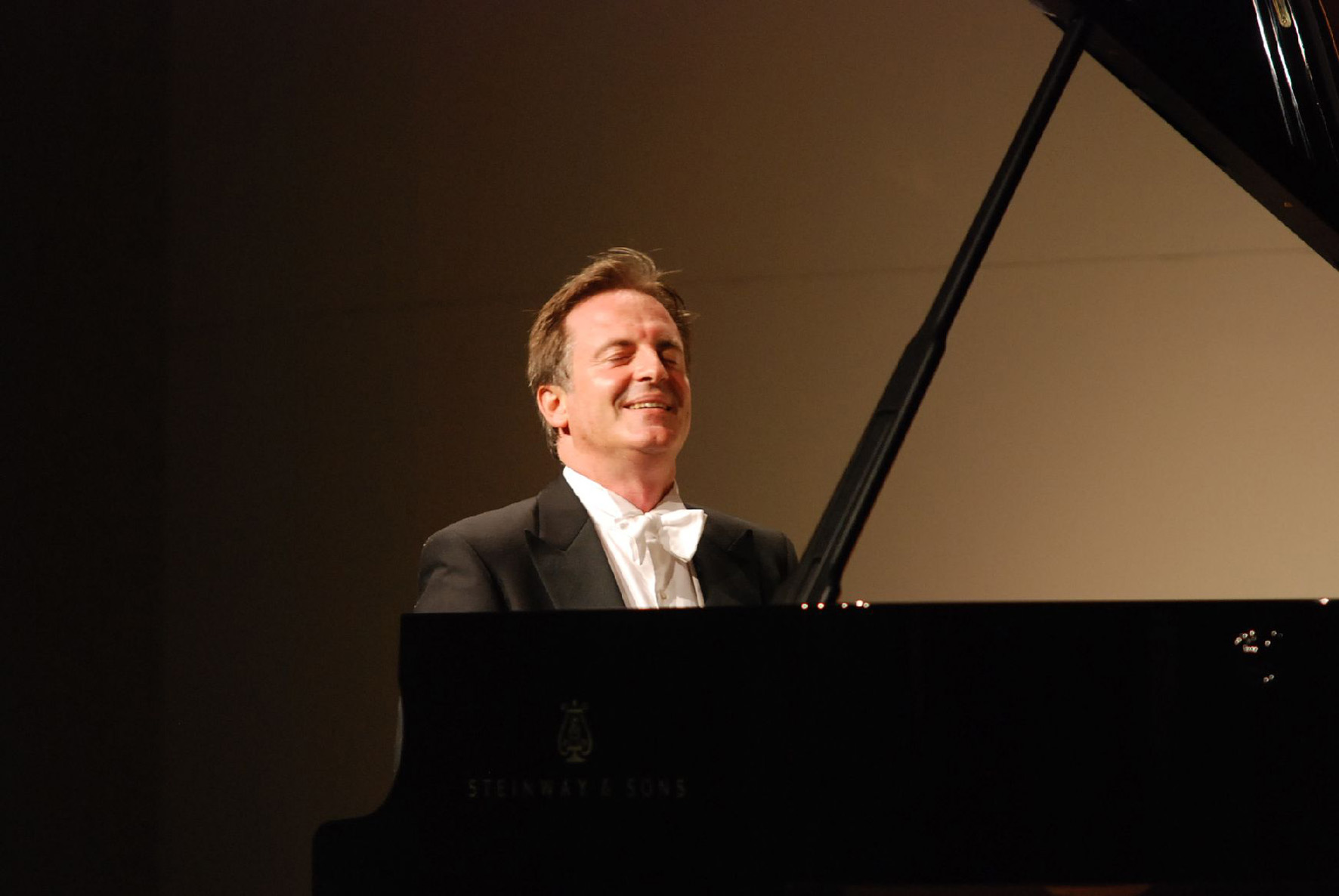
Alfredo Perl in Rheingau Musik Festival

Alfredo Perl (born in Santiago de Chile in 1965) is a Chilean-German classical pianist and conductor, best known for his recitals of Beethoven's sonatas.

== Biography ==
He began playing the piano from a young age. He studied at the Chilean National Conservatory under Carlos Botto Vallarino, and later under Günter Ludwig in Germany and Maria Curcio in London. Since then, Perl has worked with Mitsuko Uchida, Pierre-Laurent Aimard, Martha Argerich and Daniel Barenboim.

He made his debut in the International Piano Series at the Queen Elizabeth Hall in London in 1992. Perl has since performed Beethoven recitals at Wigmore Hall and a Chopin recital at the Hopetoun House in Edinburgh in 2003. Other notable venues Perl has appeared at include Vienna's Musikverein, Prague's Rudolfinum, Munich's Herkulessaal, Osaka's Izumi Hall, Buenos Aires's Teatro Colón and the Great Hall of the Moscow Conservatoire.

He has won awards in Japan, Italy, Austria and in his native Chile, and toured a programme of all the Beethoven piano sonatas, which he has also recorded. Perl has also recorded solo works by Schumann, Liszt and Busoni and concertos by Grieg, Szymanowski and Liszt. His collaborations with orchestra include the London Symphony Orchestra, the Royal Philharmonic Orchestra, the BBC Symphony Orchestra, the Sydney Symphony Orchestra and the Melbourne Symphony Orchestra. He is noted in particular for his delicate, elegant touch and feeling. The Age in Melbourne wrote, "Chilean pianist Alfredo Perl effectively disseminated the music's elegance. His interpretation was not forced during either the cadenza material or the main body... the highlight of the concert".

Perl was artistic director of the Detmold Chamber Orchestra from 2010 to 2022 and has resided in both Munich and Hamburg. He has also served as a member of the jury on several piano competitions such as the 2009 Bonn Beethoven Competition and the 2010 Scottish International Piano Competition.
