= Mathias Klotz =

Chilean architect (born 1965)

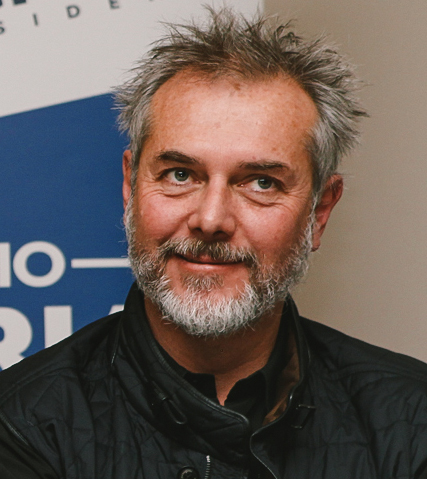
Mathias Klotz (2013)

Mathias Klotz Germain (born 13 April 1965) is a Chilean architect born and raised in Santiago, Chile. His work spans for over 30 years. He studied at the Faculty of Architecture of the Pontifical Catholic University of Chile, where he graduated in 1991. Winner of the Borromini Prize of Architecture in 2001 for under-40 architects.

Klotz together with Alejandro Aravena are among the most renowned Chilean architects of the early 21st century. His work, elegant and rooted in the Modernist tradition, has put him on the international spotlight.

Klotz is the Dean of the Faculty of Architecture of the Diego Portales University in Santiago, Chile, and is a visiting professor in multiple universities in Italy, Argentina, Mexico, Spain, and Germany. His first commission, titled "Casa Klotz", was completed in 1991 for his mother. The two-storey wooden house is located beside the seafront in Tongoy, north of Santiago.

His work, which has been published in international architectural magazines, includes:

- Casa Muller, Chiloe, Chile. 1994
- Hotel Terrantai, San Pedro de Atacama, Chile. 1996
- Casa Ugarte, Maitencillo, Chile. 1998
- Casa Reutter, Cachagua, Chile. 1999
- Colegio Altamira, Santiago, Chile. 2000
- Cantina “Las Niñas”, Santa Cruz, Chile. 2000
- Casa Ponce, Buenos Aires, Argentina. 2002
- Faculta de Economia, Universidad Diego Portales, Santiago, Chile. 2004
- La Roca House, Punta Del Este, Uruguay. 2008
- Residenza estiva "Eleven Women", Cantagua, Chile. 2007
- Raùl House, Aculeo, Chile. 2007
- Casa Techos, Nord del lago Nahuel Huapi, Argentina. 2008
- Biblioteca Nicanor Parra, Santiago, Chile. 2012
- Club House, Arena de Garzòn, Uruguay. 2012
- Valtocado House, Mijas, Spain. 2012
- Essbio Rancagua Water Tower, Rancagua, Chile. 2012
- Palacio Astoreca Hotel, Valparaiso, Chile. 2012
- Gemelas House, Santiago, Chile. 2014
- Gleim 52, Berlin, Germany. 2014
- "Francisca House," Coldita Island, Chile. 2015
