= Raúl Rettig =

Chilean politician and lawyer (1909–2000)

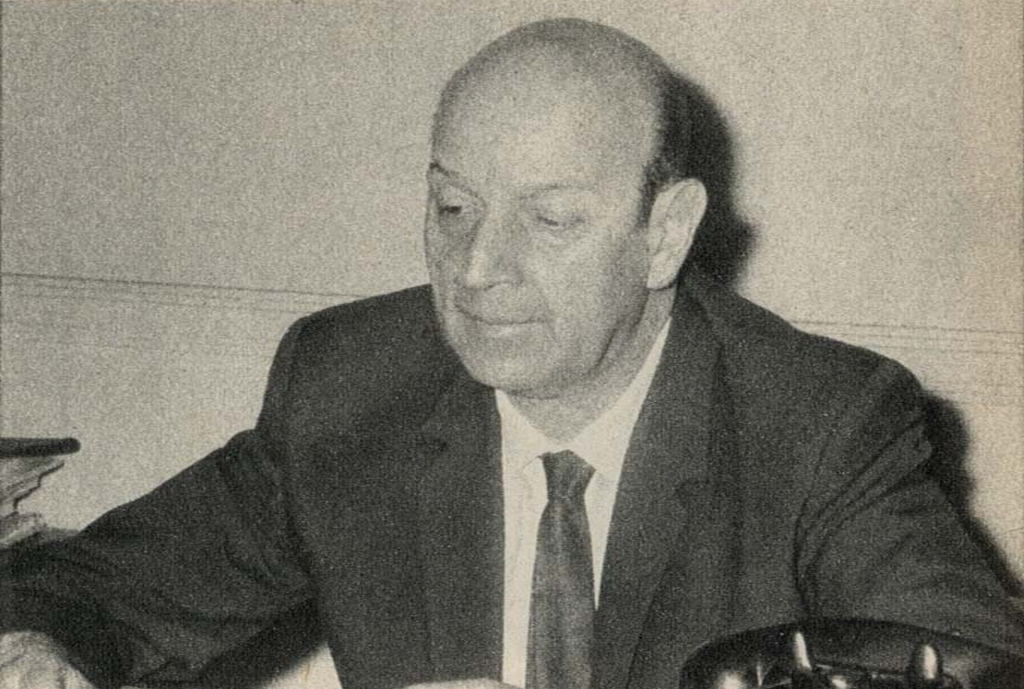
Raúl Rettig in 1969

Raúl Rettig Guissen (16 May 1909, in Temuco – 30 April 2000, in Santiago), was a Chilean politician and lawyer.

A member of the Radical Party, between 1938 and 1940 he served as undersecretary of the interior and, later, at the foreign affairs ministry. He was elected to the Senate in 1949. During the Unidad Popular government of President Salvador Allende, he served as ambassador to Brazil until the coup d'état of 11 September 1973.

During the early days of the government of Patricio Aylwin, he was appointed to chair the National Commission for Truth and Reconciliation, a truth commission set up to examine human rights violations committed under the military dictatorship of Augusto Pinochet. The commission's final report, known as the Rettig Report, was published on 9 February 1991.

== Sources ==
The earliest version of this article was translated, with minor adaptations, from the corresponding article on the Spanish-language Wikipedia.
