= Max Westenhöfer =

German pathologist and biologist (1871–1957)

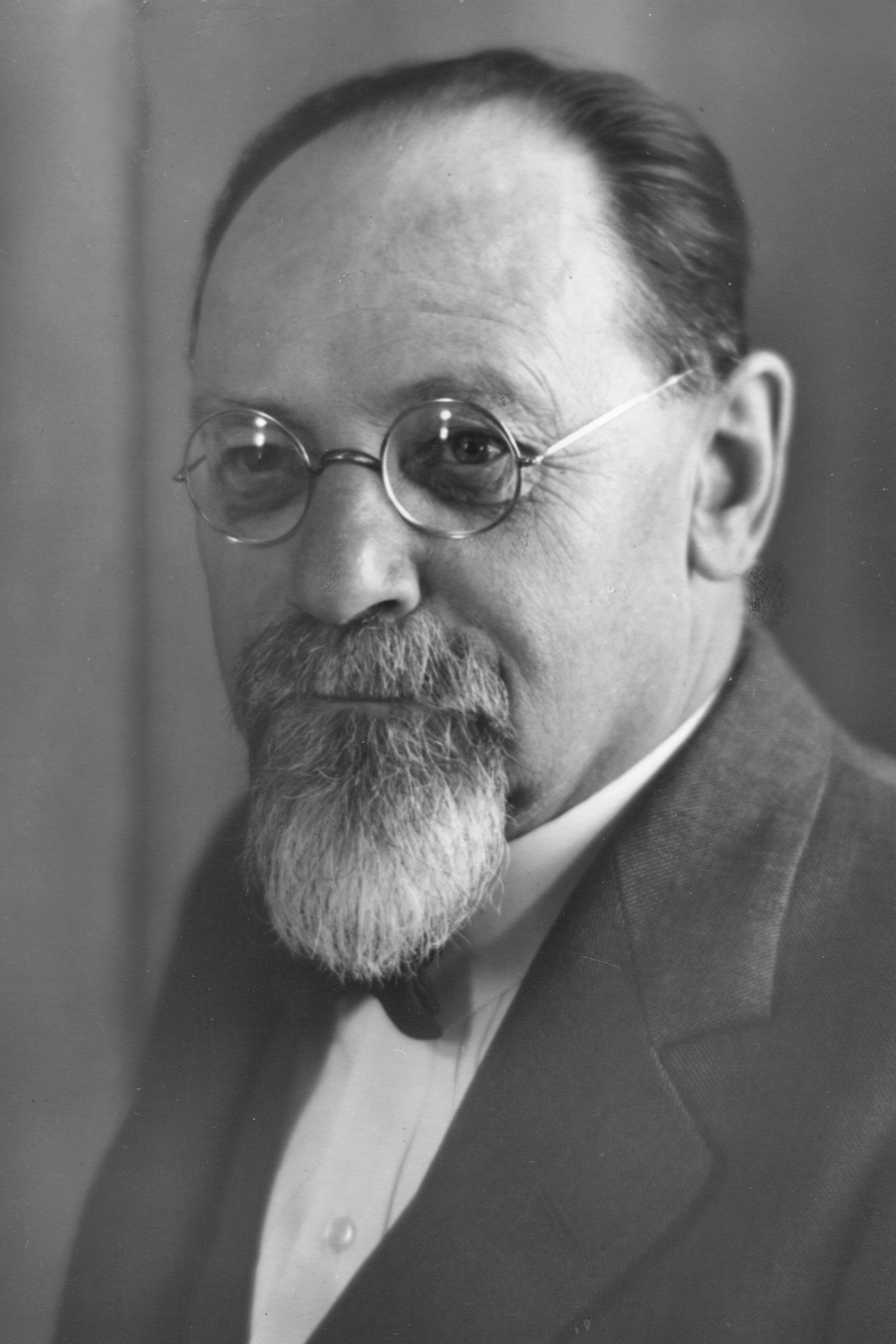
- Max Westenhöfer in 1951
- Born: February 9, 1871; Ansbach, Kingdom of Bavaria, German Empire
- Died: September 25, 1957 (aged 86); Santiago, Chile
- Scientific career
- Fields: Pathology, biology

Max Westenhöfer (February 9, 1871 – September 25, 1957) was a German pathologist and biologist who contributed to the development of the anatomic pathology and the reform of public health in Chile.

== Education ==
Maximilian Joseph Johann Westenhöfer was born on February 9, 1871, in Ansbach, Bavaria. His father was a school teacher called Johan Karl Westenhöffer, but the son later simplified the spelling of his surname. His mother's maiden name was Knell, and in later years her name was sometimes appended to his according to the Spanish naming custom. making his name Max Westenhöfer Knell.

He studied at the University of Berlin where he graduated in 1894. He was a pupil of Rudolf Virchow, German physician and Professor of Pathology at the University of Berlin, known also for his interest in public health. His first employment was as an army doctor, which he remained, apart from three years in Chile, until 1922.

== First tenure in Chile (1908–1911): Social medicine report and expulsion ==
In 1908 he was hired by Augusto Matte, on behalf of the government of Chile, to teach Pathology at the School of Medicine of the University of Chile. As an international expert with the role to reform and modernize the teaching of pathology in Chile, he was provided by the Chilean government with a higher salary than that of his local medical colleagues, leading to envy and resentment among some Chilean physicians. In 1911 he published what has been called the Westenhöfer Report, a five-part series published in the German medical journal Berliner klinische Wochenschrift where he described in critical terms the poor health conditions and hygiene practices that he observed in certain urban areas and nursing homes in Santiago of Chile. His report led to protests from the conservative sector of the Chilean society, eventually causing the government to deport him from Chile. However, the University of Chile Student Federation (FECH) including his medical students, some unions, and leftist parties gave public support to Prof. Westenhöfer and protested his expulsion. In August 1911 there was a massive march in Santiago of Chile to protest his expulsion and make a judicial appeal to prevent it, but it did not take place until after he had left.

== Return to Germany (1911–1929): Professor of pathology at the University of Berlin ==
Following his departure in 1911 he returned to Germany and resumed his career with the army. During World War I, he served as a military surgeon with the rank of major (Oberstabsarzt) and was awarded the Iron Cross, second class. In 1922 he became Professor of Pathology at the University of Berlin. At this time he was also deputy chairman of the Berlin Gesellschaft für Rassenhygiene (German Society for Racial Hygiene).

== Second tenure in Chile (1929–1932): Reform of Chilean pathology ==
He returned to Chile in 1929 and for three years directed the Department of Pathology at the Medical School of the University of Chile. This was his most fruitful period in furthering the development and the quality of Chilean medicine. He modernised the practice of pathology and trained Chilean colleagues. Pathology institutes were founded in the hospitals in Santiago and Valparaiso. His stress on the social determinants of mortality and morbidity influenced a generation of students, including Salvador Allende, a medical student activist and later President of Chile.

While in Chile, after studying the incidence of syphilis he contributed to the ongoing controversy about the origin of this disease. Westenhöfer observed little effect of the disease in Native American carriers and the terrible effects experienced by those of European origin who were infected, leading him to propose that a corresponding STD had been present in America before the European conquest.

== Back to Germany (1932–1948): Publication of the Aquatic Ape Hypothesis ==
He returned again to Germany where he spent the war years, living latterly in retirement in Wasserburg am Bodensee. From 1923 onwards he wrote several books and papers on human evolution, perhaps most fully in his 1942 book "Der Eigenweg des Menschen" (translated as "The Path Travelled by Man Alone" or "The Unique Road to Man") which put forward ideas suggesting, amongst other things, that adaptation to water has played a significant part in the history of human development. That particular idea has since been developed as the controversial Aquatic ape hypothesis (AAH), but the details of Westenhöfer's theory, such as that bipedalism is primitive in mammals, are not shared by most modern supporters of the AAH.

== Final tenure in Chile (1948–1957) ==
In 1948, at the age of 77 he returned once more to Chile under a contract with the Junta Central de Beneficencia (Central Board of Charities) to serve as a pathology adviser. For his long record of contributions in Chile he was decorated by the government with the Order of Bernardo O'Higgins. His legacy on the teaching of the anatomic pathology in Chile was continued by his students, especially Dr Ismael Mena at the University of Chile and Dr Roberto Barahona Silva, founder of the Department of Pathology at the Pontifical Catholic University of Chile.

== Personal life ==
Westenhöfer was married twice. From the first marriage, to Anna Maria, he had three children, Grete, who was born in Chile, Rudolf, who was educated at the German School of Santiago, and Wolf. Only Wolf survived the war and lived in Berlin with six children. Westenhöfer's second marriage was to Jutta, née Windmŭller, who survived him.

He died on September 25, 1957, in Santiago de Chile, which he considered his second home. Dr. Westenhöfer was buried in the Cementerio General de Santiago.

== Publications ==
- M. Westenhöffer: Tabes dorsalis und Syphilis. - Berlin: C. Vogts Buchdrückerei, 1894. - 34 pages (Berlin, Medizinische Fakultät, Inaug.-Diss. von 10. Augustus 1894) Thesis on Tabes dorsalis and Syphilis
- M. Westenhöffer: Über die Grenzen der übertragbarkeit der Tuberculose durch Fleisch tuberculöser Rinder auf den Menschen. - Berlin : A. Hirschwald, 1904. - 48 pages "On the limits of transferability of tuberculosis through the meat of tuberculous cattle to humans"
- M. Westenhöffer: Über Impftuberculose - Berlin : A. Hirschwald, 1904. - 24 pages - (Sonderabdruck aus Charité-Annalen) "On vaccination tuberculosis"
- M. Westenhöffer: Pathologisch-anatomische Ergebnisse der oberschlesischen Genickstarreepidemie von 1905 - Jena : G. Fischer, 1906. - iv, 72 pages - (Sonderabdruck aus Klin. Jahrb.) Study of 1905 meningitis epidemic in Upper Silesia
- M. Westenhöffer: Atlas der pathologisch-anatomischen Sektionstechnik - Berlin : A. Hirschwald, 1908. - viii, 53 pages. Illustrated guide for the performance of autopsies.
- Westenhöfer, Max: Die Aufgaben der Rassenhygiene (des Nachkommenschutzes) im neuen Deutschland : Vortrag, gehalten am 27. Februar 1919 in der Berliner Gesellschaft für Rassenhygiene von Dr. Med. Westenhöfer. - Berlin : Richard Schötz, 1920. - 40 pages - (Veröffentlichungen aus dem Gebiete der Medizinalverwaltung; 10,2 = Heft. 103) "Racial hygiene tasks (for protection of the descendants) in the new Germany"
- Westenhöfer, Max: Über die Erhaltung von Vorfahrenmerkmalen beim Menschen, insbesondere über eine progonische Trias und ihre praktische Bedeutung. - In: Medizinische Klinik, 1923, 37. - pages 1247–1255. "On the preservation of ancestor's characteristics in human beings, and especially on a trio of primitive features and their importance in practice"
- Westenhöfer, Max (October 1926). "Evidence Opposed to the Darwinian Conceptions of the Origin of Species". Journal of the American Medical Association. 87 (18): 1494–1495. doi:10.1001/jama.1926.02680180066026.
- Westenhöfer, Max: Über die Klettermethoden der Naturvölker und über die Stellung der grossen Zehe - Leipzig : C. Kabitzsch, 1927. - pages 361–392. - Ill. - (Aus: Archiv für Frauenkunde und Konstitutionsforschung, Band 13, 1927, Heft 5) "On the climbing methods of primitive peoples and the position of the big toe"
- Westenhöfer, Max (1935). Das Problem der Menschwerdung : dargestellt auf Grund morphogenetischer Betrachtungen über Gehirn und Schädel und unter Bezugnahme auf zahlreiche andere Körpergegenden. Berlin: Nornen-Verlag. - "The problem of human origin, presented through morphogenetic reflections on the brain and skull, and with reference to many other parts of the body."
- Westenhöfer, Max (1942). Der Eigenweg des Menschen: dargestellt auf Grund von vergleichend morphologischen Untersuchungen über die Artbildung und Menschwerdung. Berlin: Die Medizinische Welt. "The unique path of man, depicted on the basis of comparative morphological studies on the formation of species and the origin of humanity"
- Westenhöfer, Max (1948). Die Grundlagen meiner Theorie vom Eigenweg des Menschen: Entwicklung, Menschwerdung, Weltanschauung. Heidelberg: Winter. "The basics of my theory of man's unique path: development, human origin, worldview"

== See also ==
- List of pathologists
- German Chilean
