= La Quintrala =

Chilean serial killer (1604–1665)

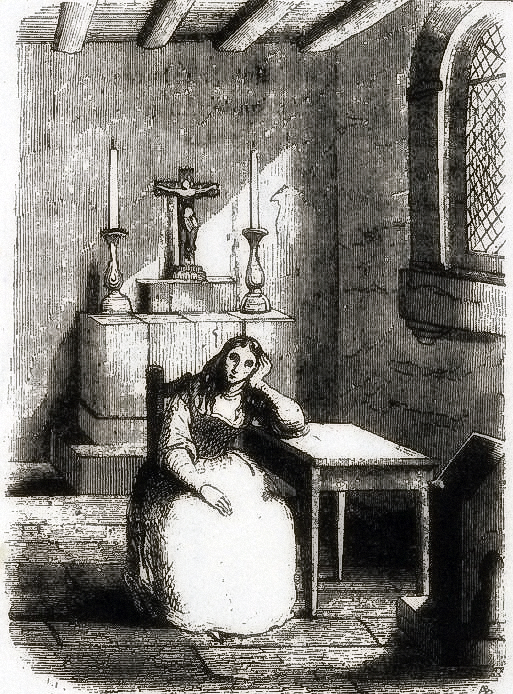
- Born: Catalina de los Ríos y Lísperguer; October 1604; Santiago, Captaincy General of Chile, Spanish Empire
- Died: January 16, 1665 (aged 60); Santiago, Captaincy General of Chile, Spanish Empire
- Other name: "La Quintrala"
- Conviction: Murder

Details
- Victims: 40
- Country: Chile

Catalina de los Ríos y Lísperguer (October 1604 – January 16, 1665), nicknamed La Quintrala because of her flaming red hair (similar in color to a scarlet flower called quintrala), was an aristocratic 17th-century Chilean landowner and murderer of the Colonial Era. She is famous for her beauty and, according to legend, her cruel treatment of her servants. Her persona is strongly mythified, and survives in Chilean culture as the epitome of the wicked and abusive woman.

== Life ==
Catalina was the daughter of Gonzalo de los Ríos y Encío and his wife, Catalina Lísperguer y Flores, both members of the Chilean nobility.

Her father was the son of Gonzalo de los Ríos y Ávila, a Spanish soldier who fought in the Conquest of Chile, and María Encío, the sister of Juan Encío, who was one of the financiers of the expedition of Pedro de Valdivia. Gonzalo de los Ríos y Encío was a landowner of Santiago's colonial society. He held the rank of general in the Royal Army and was a maestre de campo who served as mayor of Santiago in 1611, 1614 and 1619. He was also the owner of a prosperous farm in Longotoma, which grew sugar cane using the labor of enslaved Black people. He also owned plantations in the valley of La Ligua that grew fruit trees and vineyards, and another farm in Cabildo called El Ingenio.

Catalina and María de Lísperguer were the only girls. The sisters—who had been accused of poisoning Governor Alonso de Ribera in 1604, out of spite—had as a blood brother Juan Rodulfo de Lísperguer y Flores, killed in the battle of the fort of Boroa in 1626. Her sister, María de Lísperguer, who had been charged with murder for the attempted poisoning, was expelled to Peru. Catalina Lísperguer remained in Chile and, with Gonzalo de los Ríos, had two daughters: Águeda, wife of the Liman judge Blas de Torres Altamirano, and Catalina, called La Quintrala.

== Childhood and youth ==
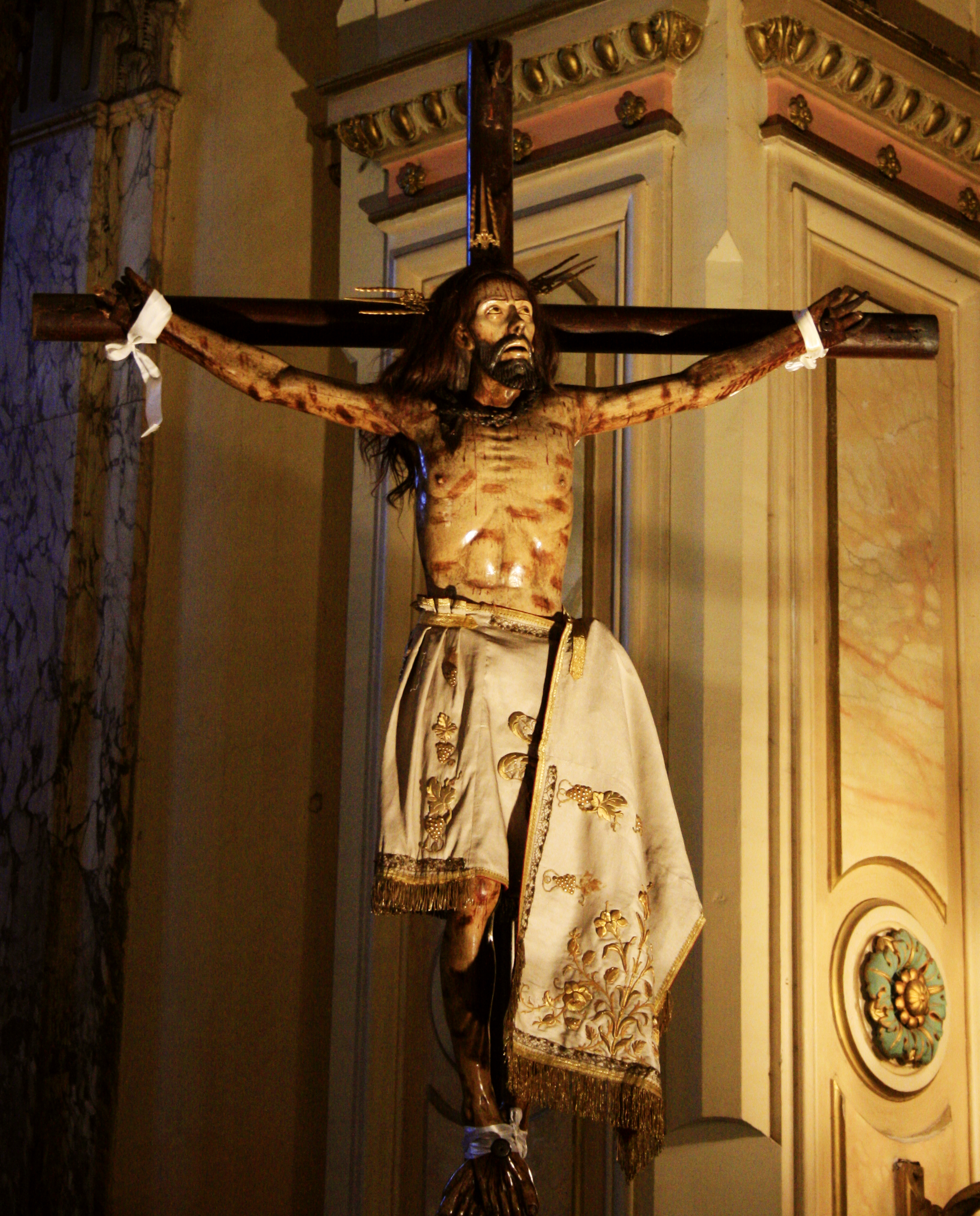
Figure of the Christ of May that, according to tradition, belonged to Catalina de los Ríos y Lísperguer

"La Quintrala" grew up in a family of rich landowners; both the De los Ríos and the Lísperguers were renowned families in the 17th century high society of Santiago. Despite this, she did not receive a good education and was semiliterate until her death. She was mainly cared for by her father and grandmother.

The nickname "La Quintrala" is probably a deviation from the diminutive of her given name, Catrala or Catralita. However, another theory says that the nickname comes from the fact that she whipped her slaves with branches from the quintral (Tristerix corymbosus), an indigenous parasitic plant whose red flowers matched Catalina's red hair. Magdalena Petit also maintains in her book La Quintrala that the nickname comes from the quintral, making a comparison to the color of her hair.

Catalina was considered a beauty, with a white complexion, a tall stature, red hair, and intense green eyes. She was a mix of Amerindian, Spanish, and German blood, which had given her remarkable physical attributes "that made her very attractive to men", according to the chronicles of bishop Francisco González de Salcedo (1622–1634).

It is said that one of her aunts, along with her grandmother Águeda Flores (daughter of Tala Canta Ilabe, the Incan governor of Talagante), had approached the young woman with the pagan practices of witchcraft.

One of the first accusations against her was that she had murdered her own father, poisoning him with the dinner she had prepared for him (apparently chicken, according to Benjamín Vicuña Mackenna). This must have happened when her father was ill in bed in 1622, when she was just 18 years old. Despite her aunt's reporting the crime to the authorities, Catalina was never prosecuted, either due to a lack of evidence or her family's influence.

== Personal life ==
=== Marriage ===
Águeda Flores, who since Catalina's parents' death had become the girl's tutor, began looking for a man for her to marry. She thought a husband would change her granddaughter's ways and offered a generous dowry (45,349 pesos, a considerable sum at the time) in return.

In September 1626, at the age of 22, Catalina entered into a marriage of convenience with the Spanish colonel Alonso Campofrío de Carvajal y Riberos. He was the 42-year-old successor to Maule whose family descended from the Counts of Urgell and the House of Barcelona. The priest who married them was Pedro de Figueroa; the legend says that Catalina never forgave him and tried to assassinate him, although according to another version she fell in love with him and harassed him to the point of exhaustion, but to no avail.

Alonso Campofrio immediately began to rise through the ranks of public office, even replacing Catalina's relative, Rodolfo Lísperguer, as mayor. The year after their marriage, Catalina gave birth to her first and only son, Gonzalo, who died when he was 8 or 10 years old. Approximately in 1628, her sister died in Peru, and Catalina became the owner of a large part of her sister's land in Chile.

According to the historian Benjamín Vicuña Mackenna, Catalina's husband was aware of her ruthless ways, but was still kind and loving towards her. She held him in great regard but never came to love him.

=== Lovers ===
It is said that in 1624, Catalina invited (via a love letter) a rich vassal ("feudatario") from Santiago to her house. When she had him in her arms, Catalina killed him with knives and blamed the crime on a slave, who was subsequently executed in the Plaza de Armas. However, some facts from this version of the tale are doubtful because, according to what is written in Catalina's will, she did not know how to write.

It is also said that she beat and stabbed a former lover, Enrique Enríquez de Guzmán of the Order of Malta, on the grounds that he had played with her feelings (since he had refused to give her a cross, a symbol of his nobility, in exchange for a kiss). Enríquez even dared to brag about his love affairs to the friar Pedro de Figueroa, Catalina's platonic love, and publicly boasted about taking advantage of a "loose" woman, referring to Catalina.

It is also said that she severed the left ear of Martín de Ensenada, and that she killed a knight of Santiago in front of another gentleman, after a romantic date.

== Landowner ==
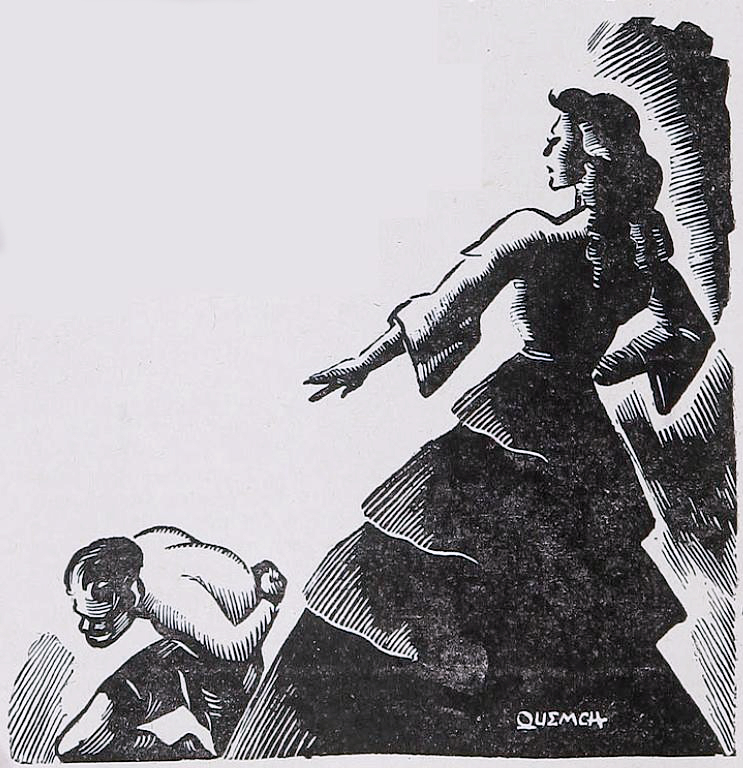
Illustration depicting La Quintrala abusing a peon.

Catalina became a landowner, since she inherited a lot of land from her father in the coastal valley of Longotoma. This included the farm "El Ingenio" and others of the same size (both in Cuyo, beyond the Andes, and in Petorca), and minor properties near the mountains in the suburbs of Santiago (the current commune of La Reina). She made her home in the latter estate, where there would still be vines planted by her. Now a wealthy landowner and rancher, Catalina personally directed the activities of the properties, riding her horses through the valleys where she so enjoyed living, since she hated the city.

In 'El Ingenio', according to legend, horrible events began to occur, both during her husband's lifespan and after his death around 1650. A black slave named Ñatucón-Jetón was killed without any known motive for the homicide (La Quintrala then kept him unburied for two weeks). In 1633, she tried to kill Luis Vásquez, a cleric from La Ligua, who reproached Catalina for her frivolous life and cruel actions.

Her cruelty reached such an extreme that in that same year, her tenants rebelled and fled towards the mountains and neighboring districts. Catalina had them brought back by force by the provisions of the Royal Audience. The steward Ascencio Erazo was put in charge of the job and soon caught the slaves and brought them back to Catalina's estate. Here, Catalina presided over the punishments for the rebellion, accompanied by her nephew and her best supporter, Jerónimo de Altamirano. In spite of continuous complaints of abuses and cruelties, she did not receive any punishment because she shared her wealth with judges and lawyers, on top of having numerous relatives in important positions.

=== Intervention of justice ===
In 1660, the Royal Audience, in light of the number and magnitude of the complaints against La Quintrala, began a secret official investigation based on the accusations of the bishop Francisco Luis de Salcedo, a relative of Luis Vásquez. The person in charge of the investigation was Justice Francisco de Millán.

Millán moved Catalina, her steward, and her nephew away from 'El Ingenio' so that the victims could vent their feelings about the crimes committed by their patron. The commissioner of the Hearing found sufficient evidence of the veracity of the accusations, which were forwarded to the capital. With a Justice ("oidor") of the Royal Audience, Juan de la Peña Salazar, acting as sheriff, La Quintrala was arrested at her estate and taken to Santiago for a criminal trial.

Against Catalina, who had already been accused of both patricide and murder, a trial was begun for the slow and cruel slaughter of her servants. Catalina was charged with about 40 murders, contributing to her mythical status. The much publicized trial was carried out very slowly due to the influence of her name, her relatives, and her wealth. Also, due to her connections, even the Justices ("oidores") favored the defendant's case. As a result, the trial was stalled and Catalina was released. From 1637 on she enjoyed, in addition to other things, the Repartimientos in the mountainous Eastern part of Codegua, which had belonged to a congregation of Jesuits.

Three decades later, justice insisted on figuring out the veracity of the accusations, but La Quintrala had already died 9 years previously.

== Widowhood and final years ==
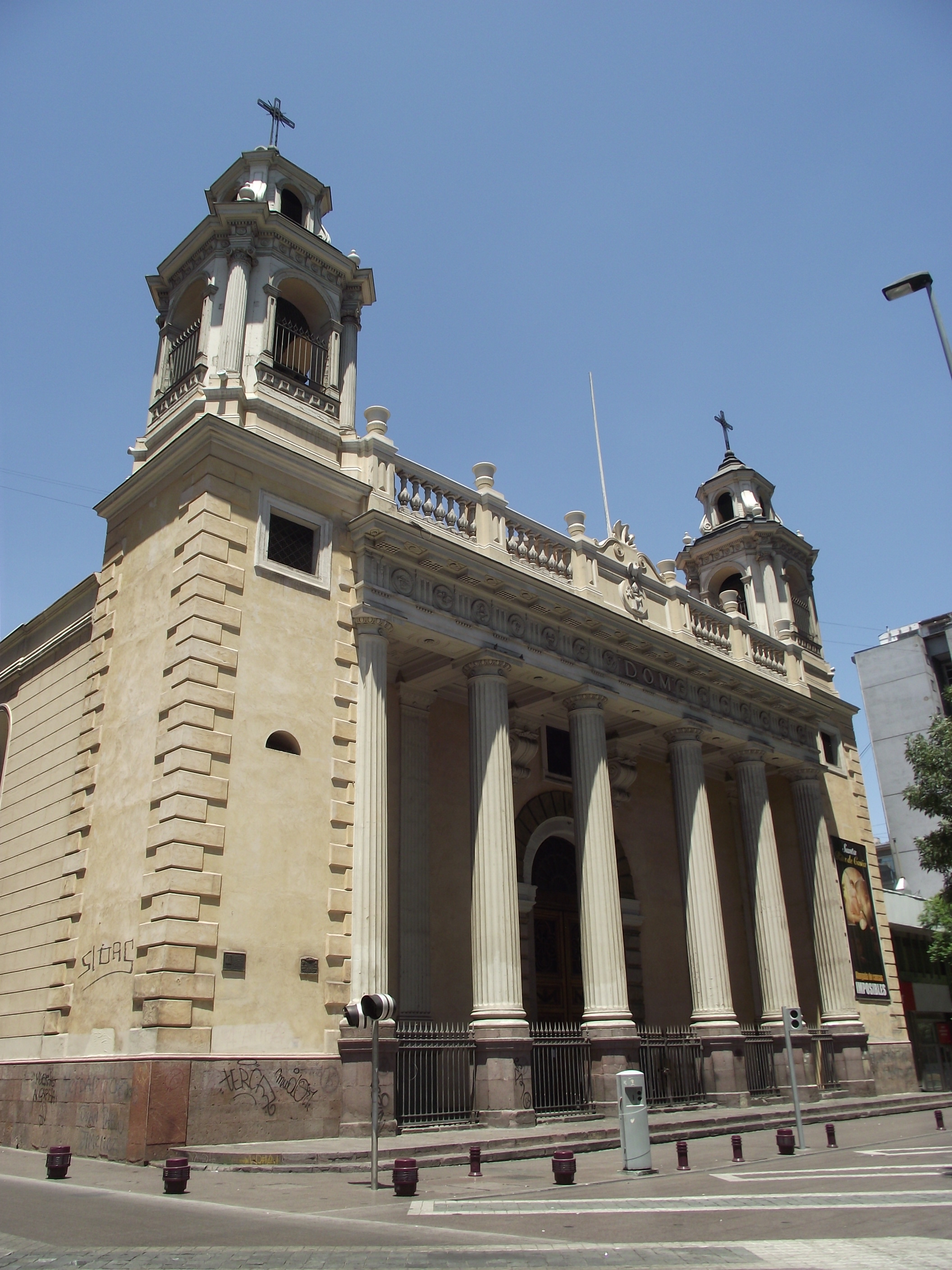
The Iglesia San Agustin in Chile, where La Quintrala is buried.

In 1654 Catalina became a widow, thereby regaining full control over the lands and businesses she shared with her husband Alonso. In January 1662, a new trial began against her for various abuses and crimes committed against her slaves. That same year her nephew, Jerónimo, died, and she herself fell ill. From then on, her health deteriorated gradually until her death in 1665.

In her will and testament, dated 1665, Catalina paid for masses at the Church of San Agustin, both for her soul and the souls of her loved ones, as well as those who had lived under her charge. She also established various chaplaincies, including one established in favor of Cristo de Mayo (a sculpture that, according to legend, would have belonged to her and from which she would have been liberated because she looked at it with reproach), and thus maintained annual atonement on May 13. Another smaller sum was given to her relatives and friends, with the rest of her assets auctioned for the benefit of the Augustinians.

She died on January 15, 1665, at the age of 61 (an advanced age for the time), feared and mythologized in life, alone and despised by all, in her Santiago property adjoining the temple of San Agustín. Her funeral was lavish and she was buried, as was tradition in the Lísperguer family, in the Church of San Augustín, but it is unknown where exactly her tomb is.

According to the chronicles of Benjamín Vicuña Mackenna, much of her assets were auctioned and her properties abandoned for years, as superstitious people were afraid of having any relation to La Quintrala.

== Legacy ==
Her figure still lives in Chilean popular culture as the epitome of the perverse and abusive woman, as well as the oppression of Spanish rule. Currently, literature has taken a revisionist stance towards La Quintrala, who was the only Chilean female figure from the 17th century. In two centuries she was vilified and there arose an alleged "machismo" bias against a woman with power and preparation. In her time, there existed a society where women were only destined for supporting roles for men.

Danish composer Lars Graugaard composed an opera based on her. Graugaard's opera La Quintrala for five singers and interactive computer was premiered September 2, 2004, in Copenhagen.

Benjamín Vicuña Mackenna wrote Los Lísperguer y La Quintrala (1877) about her.

== Articles ==
Piedrabuena Ruiz-Tagle, Daniel. Los Lisperguer Wittemberg: Luces y sombras de una singular familia alemana presente en la historia de España y Chile. Atenea (Concepción), Dic 2015, no.512, p. 171-187. ISSN 0718-0462

== See also ==
- Elizabeth Báthory
- Delphine LaLaurie
- Darya Nikolayevna Saltykova
- List of serial killers by country
