= Rubén Oyarzo =

Chilean politician (born 1980)

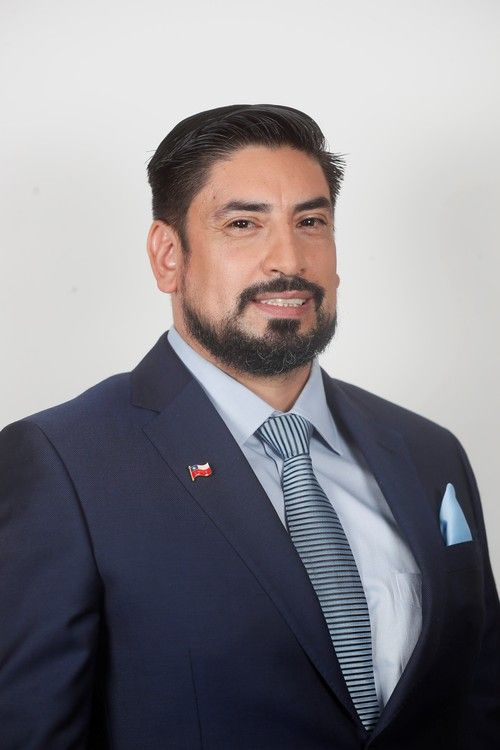

Member of the Chamber of Deputies
- In office 11 March 2022 – 11 March 2026
- Constituency: District 8

Personal details
- Born: 13 December 1980 (age 45) Santiago, Chile
- Party: Party of the People (2021–2024); Radical Party (2025–)
- Children: Two
- Parent(s): Rubén Oyarzo; Inés Figueroa
- Education: Iberoamerican University of Science and Technology; University of the Pacific; University of Chile (PgD); San Sebastián University (MBA)
- Occupation: Politician

Rubén Darío Oyarzo Figueroa (born 13 December 1980) is a Chilean politician who served as deputy in the LVI Legislative Period of the National Congress of Chile.

== Biography ==
He is the son of Rubén Oyarzo Ojeda and Inés Figueroa Salas. He has two children and is separated.

He completed his secondary education at the Eduardo Frei Montalva Superior Institute of Commerce (INSUCO), graduating in 1998 with a technical degree as a General Accountant. From 1999 to 2002, he pursued studies at the School of Public Accountants of Santiago.

In 2000, he enrolled at the Universidad Iberoamericana de Ciencias y Tecnología, from which he graduated in 2004 with a degree as a Public Accountant and Auditor. Between 2005 and 2007, he obtained a bachelor's degree in Business Administration and the professional degree of Commercial Engineer from the University of the Pacific.

In 2011, he completed a postgraduate diploma in Accounting and International Financial Reporting Standards (IFRS) at the University of Chile.

Professionally, he has worked in several private-sector companies, including Copesa, Sodexo, Tecnoimagen Chile, MPM Ltda., Amphos 21, Veka Chile, and the JM bus company.

== Political career ==
He became involved in politics as a social activist in Maipú, where he participated in initiatives aimed at improving connectivity between Camino a Melipilla Avenue and the western sector of the commune. He later joined the Party of the People (PDG), serving as a municipal councilor in Colina.

For the 2021 parliamentary elections, he ran as a candidate for the Chamber of Deputies in District 8, which includes the communes of Lampa, Maipú, Cerrillos, Quilicura, Tiltil, Colina, Estación Central, and Pudahuel. He was elected after receiving 6,953 votes, representing 1.48% of the valid votes cast, and assumed office on 11 March 2022.

In April 2024, Oyarzo announced his resignation from the PDG, expressing criticism of the party’s founder and former presidential candidate, Franco Parisi.

In April 2025, he joined the Radical Party of Chile, marking a shift in his political alignment from the center-right toward the center-left.

He ran for re-election in District 8 in the parliamentary elections held on 16 November 2025, representing the Radical Party of Chile as part of the Unidad por Chile coalition. He was not elected, obtaining 13,261 votes, equivalent to 1.73% of the total votes cast.
