= District 8 (Chamber of Deputies of Chile) =

Electoral district of the Chamber of Deputies of Chile

- Distrito 8
- Electoral District for the Chamber of Deputies
- Location of District 8 within Chile
- Commune: List: Cerrillos; Colina; Estación Central; Lampa; Maipú; Pudahuel; Quilicura; Tiltil
- Region: Santiago
- Population: 1,457,756 (2017)
- Electorate: 1,068,168 (2021)
- Area: 2,499 km^{2} (2020)

Current Electoral District
- Created: 2017
- Seats: 8 (2017–present)
- Deputies: List: Viviana Delgado (Ind); Carmen Hertz (PC); Cristián Labbé (UDI); Joaquín Lavín (UDI); Claudia Mix (FA); Rubén Darío Oyarzo (Ind); Agustín Romero (REP); Alberto Undurraga (PDC)

District 8 (Spanish: Distrito 8) is one of the 28 multi-member electoral districts of the Chamber of Deputies, the lower house of the National Congress, the national legislature of Chile. The district was created by the 2015 electoral reform and came into being at the following general election in 2017. It consists of the communes of Cerrillos, Colina, Estación Central, Lampa, Maipú, Pudahuel, Quilicura and Tiltil in the region of Santiago. The district currently elects eight of the 155 members of the Chamber of Deputies using the open party-list proportional representation electoral system. At the 2021 general election the district had 1,068,168 registered electors.

== Electoral system ==
District 8 currently elects eight of the 155 members of the Chamber of Deputies using the open party-list proportional representation electoral system. Parties may form electoral pacts with each other to pool their votes and increase their chances of winning seats. However, the number of candidates nominated by an electoral pact may not exceed the maximum number of candidates that a single party may nominate. Seats are allocated using the D'Hondt method.

== Election results ==
=== Summary ===
Election	Apruebo Dignidad AD / FA			Green Ecologists PEV			Dignidad Ahora DA			New Social Pact NPS / NM			Democratic Convergence CD			Chile Vamos Podemos / Vamos			Party of the People PDG			Christian Social Front FSC		
Election	Votes	%	Seats	Votes	%	Seats	Votes	%	Seats	Votes	%	Seats	Votes	%	Seats	Votes	%	Seats	Votes	%	Seats	Votes	%	Seats
2021	115,106	24.48%	2	43,186	9.19%	1	15,932	3.39%	0	55,241	11.75%	1				86,877	18.48%	2	39,270	8.35%	1	51,042	10.86%	1
2017	95,195	22.45%	2							88,137	20.78%	2	46,479	10.96%	1	164,734	38.85%	3						

=== Detailed ===
==== 2021 ====
Results of the 2021 general election held on 21 November 2021:

Party		Pact	Party											Pact		
Party		Pact	Votes per commune								Total votes	%	Seats	Votes	%	Seats
Party		Pact	Cerril- los	Colina	Esta- ción Central	Lampa	Maipú	Puda- huel	Quili- cura	Tiltil	Total votes	%	Seats	Votes	%	Seats
Communist Party of Chile	PC	Apruebo Dignidad	3,660	3,009	7,707	2,734	25,453	10,133	9,266	799	62,761	13.35%	1	115,106	24.48%	2
Comunes	COM	Apruebo Dignidad	1,708	1,253	2,990	1,587	16,901	4,332	3,460	340	32,571	6.93%	1	115,106	24.48%	2
Democratic Revolution	RD	Apruebo Dignidad	1,090	822	1,368	725	8,299	2,380	2,358	174	17,216	3.66%	0	115,106	24.48%	2
Social Green Regionalist Federation	FREVS	Apruebo Dignidad	135	115	189	102	1,251	395	347	24	2,558	0.54%	0	115,106	24.48%	2
Independent Democratic Union	UDI	Chile Podemos +	2,455	10,450	5,163	2,707	19,271	6,536	5,761	841	53,184	11.31%	2	86,877	18.48%	2
National Renewal	RN	Chile Podemos +	1,095	3,641	1,905	1,310	7,573	2,536	2,332	291	20,683	4.40%	0	86,877	18.48%	2
Evópoli	EVO	Chile Podemos +	2,067	2,794	928	553	4,634	1,104	844	86	13,010	2.77%	0	86,877	18.48%	2
Christian Democratic Party	PDC	New Social Pact	950	1,268	1,383	1,860	12,798	1,852	1,941	174	22,226	4.73%	1	55,241	11.75%	1
Liberal Party of Chile	PL	New Social Pact	625	841	1,245	533	6,000	1,704	1,412	137	12,497	2.66%	0	55,241	11.75%	1
Socialist Party of Chile	PS	New Social Pact	433	347	4,222	298	2,039	2,914	576	62	10,891	2.32%	0	55,241	11.75%	1
Party for Democracy	PPD	New Social Pact	347	305	570	275	2,308	3,136	853	69	7,863	1.67%	0	55,241	11.75%	1
Radical Party of Chile	PR	New Social Pact	144	140	228	103	548	261	242	98	1,764	0.38%	0	55,241	11.75%	1
Republican Party	REP	Christian Social Front	3,162	6,971	5,330	3,104	18,944	6,959	5,981	591	51,042	10.86%	1	51,042	10.86%	1
Green Ecologist Party	PEV		2,289	2,315	3,362	1,990	21,018	5,621	6,069	522	43,186	9.19%	1	43,186	9.19%	1
Party of the People	PDG		2,342	2,585	2,934	2,858	14,362	6,667	6,892	630	39,270	8.35%	1	39,270	8.35%	1
Cesar Leiva Rubio (Independent)	Ind		2,049	2,363	3,166	2,503	12,910	5,439	5,780	562	34,772	7.40%	0	34,772	7.40%	0
Humanist Party	PH	Dignidad Ahora	656	534	787	357	2,715	1,420	2,000	87	8,556	1.82%	0	15,932	3.39%	0
Equality Party	IGUAL	Dignidad Ahora	370	335	704	298	2,090	2,669	817	93	7,376	1.57%	0	15,932	3.39%	0
United Centre	CU	United Independents	613	676	964	578	3,355	1,622	1,452	116	9,376	1.99%	0	9,376	1.99%	0
Patriotic Union	UPA		517	523	783	449	2,786	1,507	1,029	124	7,718	1.64%	0	7,718	1.64%	0
Revolutionary Workers Party	PTR		385	463	649	370	1,828	1,269	956	93	6,013	1.28%	0	6,013	1.28%	0
Progressive Party	PRO		311	353	501	451	2,011	1,085	806	65	5,583	1.19%	0	5,583	1.19%	0
Valid votes			27,403	42,103	47,078	25,745	189,094	71,541	61,174	5,978	470,116	100.00%	8	470,116	100.00%	8
Blank votes			1,732	2,736	3,073	1,848	8,796	4,789	3,972	661	27,607	5.25%				
Rejected votes – other			1,799	2,231	2,996	1,527	9,844	4,634	4,284	538	27,853	5.30%				
Total polled			30,934	47,070	53,147	29,120	207,734	80,964	69,430	7,177	525,576	49.20%				
Registered electors			66,557	94,052	125,639	62,829	392,526	169,810	141,793	14,962	1,068,168					
Turnout			46.48%	50.05%	42.30%	46.35%	52.92%	47.68%	48.97%	47.97%	49.20%					

The following candidates were elected: Viviana Delgado (PEV), 20,140 votes; Carmen Hertz (PC), 48,981 votes; Cristián Labbé (UDI), 11,787 votes; Joaquín Lavín (UDI), 33,067 votes; Claudia Mix (COM), 24,375 votes; Rubén Darío Oyarzo (PDG), 6,953 votes; Agustín Romero (REP), 17,173 votes; and Alberto Undurraga (PDC), 17,158 votes.

==== 2017 ====
Results of the 2017 general election held on 19 November 2017:

Party		Pact	Party											Pact		
Party		Pact	Votes per commune								Total votes	%	Seats	Votes	%	Seats
Party		Pact	Cerril- los	Colina	Esta- ción Central	Lampa	Maipú	Puda- huel	Quili- cura	Tiltil	Total votes	%	Seats	Votes	%	Seats
Independent Democratic Union	UDI	Chile Vamos	5,709	10,820	10,165	4,747	46,808	13,741	10,821	1,373	104,184	24.57%	2	164,734	38.85%	3
National Renewal	RN	Chile Vamos	3,400	4,584	4,210	2,445	12,209	4,441	4,175	401	35,865	8.46%	1	164,734	38.85%	3
Independent Regionalist Party	PRI	Chile Vamos	1,517	5,103	2,420	1,522	8,284	3,044	2,270	525	24,685	5.82%	0	164,734	38.85%	3
Citizen Power	PODER	Broad Front	1,619	939	2,198	919	20,556	3,887	3,199	303	33,620	7.93%	1	95,195	22.45%	2
Democratic Revolution	RD	Broad Front	1,491	1,035	2,740	873	10,511	4,079	3,120	213	24,062	5.67%	1	95,195	22.45%	2
Humanist Party	PH	Broad Front	1,233	753	4,260	818	6,540	3,111	2,744	161	19,620	4.63%	0	95,195	22.45%	2
Green Ecologist Party	PEV	Broad Front	1,060	816	1,683	839	7,747	2,964	2,622	162	17,893	4.22%	0	95,195	22.45%	2
Social Democrat Radical Party	PRSD	Nueva Mayoría	3,927	980	5,539	923	15,381	2,323	1,768	156	30,997	7.31%	1	88,137	20.78%	2
Communist Party of Chile	PC	Nueva Mayoría	1,927	771	4,847	893	11,616	3,626	4,126	366	28,172	6.64%	1	88,137	20.78%	2
Socialist Party of Chile	PS	Nueva Mayoría	1,489	1,196	2,394	921	6,500	8,165	1,811	238	22,714	5.36%	0	88,137	20.78%	2
Party for Democracy	PPD	Nueva Mayoría	303	218	537	278	2,118	745	1,966	89	6,254	1.47%	0	88,137	20.78%	2
Christian Democratic Party	PDC	Democratic Convergence	2,080	4,261	3,852	3,342	11,566	9,601	10,653	1,124	46,479	10.96%	1	46,479	10.96%	1
Progressive Party	PRO	All Over Chile	1,428	1,344	2,243	1,081	7,217	3,948	2,300	351	19,912	4.70%	0	19,912	4.70%	0
Patriotic Union	UPA		715	577	1,039	534	3,476	1,751	1,323	177	9,592	2.26%	0	9,592	2.26%	0
Valid votes			27,898	33,397	48,127	20,135	170,529	65,426	52,898	5,639	424,049	100.00%	8	424,049	100.00%	8
Blank votes			2,001	2,168	3,154	1,722	9,124	4,967	3,524	525	27,185	5.63%				
Rejected votes – other			1,991	1,845	3,721	1,505	12,122	5,535	4,342	455	31,516	6.53%				
Total polled			31,890	37,410	55,002	23,362	191,775	75,928	60,764	6,619	482,750	48.04%				
Registered electors			67,804	79,070	126,168	49,911	376,042	163,680	128,414	13,799	1,004,888					
Turnout			47.03%	47.31%	43.59%	46.81%	51.00%	46.39%	47.32%	47.97%	48.04%					

The following candidates were elected: Pepe Auth (PRSD), 26,839 votes; Mario Desbordes (RN), 17,799 votes; Carmen Hertz (PC), 16,035 votes; Joaquín Lavín (UDI), 75,973 votes; Patricio Melero (UDI), 23,042 votes; Claudia Mix (PODER), 20,958 votes; Gabriel Silber (PDC), 29,205 votes; and Pablo Vidal (RD), 12,135 votes.
