= Claudia Mix =

Chilean politician (born 1969)

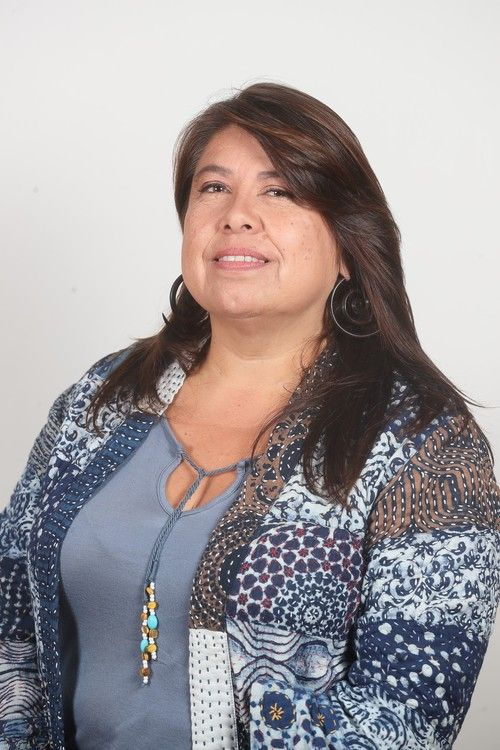

Member of the Chamber of Deputies
- In office 11 March 2018 – 11 March 2026
- Preceded by: District created
- Constituency: District 8

Personal details
- Born: 19 July 1985 (age 41) Santiago, Chile
- Other political affiliations: MAS Region (2012–2013); Humanist Party (2013); Izquierda Unida (2013–2014); Citizen Power (2015–2019); Commons (2019–2024)
- Education: Academy of Christian Humanism University
- Occupation: Politician
- Profession: Social worker

Claudia Nathalie Mix Jiménez (born 13 June 1969) is a Chilean politician and currently a member of the Chamber of Deputies of Chile.

== Family and early life ==
She was born in Maipú, Santiago Metropolitan Region, on 13 July 1969. She is the daughter of Víctor Mix Fortín, a laborer and film and theatre actor, and Eliana Jiménez Caviedes.

She is single and the mother of two children, Catalina and Ariel.

== Political career ==
In 1986, during the period of military dictatorship in Chile, she became the first democratically elected president of the student council of the Liceo Municipal de Maipú. She later became active as a trade union leader in 1994.

In 2012, she ran for mayor of the Municipality of Maipú for the first time, representing the Movimiento Amplio Social (MAS). She obtained 10,977 votes, equivalent to 9.62% of the total votes cast, and was not elected. That same year, she publicly denounced what she referred to as the “waste mafia” operating in Maipú, an action that resulted in her dismissal from her position at the Municipality of Maipú.

She ran for mayor of Maipú for a second time in the municipal elections held on 23 October 2016, this time as an independent candidate. She received 11,004 votes, equivalent to 11.30% of the votes cast, and was again not elected.

In August 2017, she launched her candidacy for the Chamber of Deputies of Chile representing the 8th electoral district of the Santiago Metropolitan Region, which includes the communes of Colina, Lampa, Tiltil, Quilicura, Pudahuel, Estación Central, Cerrillos and Maipú. She ran as a candidate for the Partido Poder and was elected with 20,958 votes, equivalent to 4.94% of the valid votes cast.

In August 2021, she sought re-election for the same district. She was re-elected in November 2021 representing the Comunes party within the Apruebo Dignidad coalition, obtaining 24,375 votes, equivalent to 5.18% of the valid votes cast.

Since July 2024, she has been a member of the Broad Front.

She ran for re-election once again in the parliamentary elections held on 16 November 2025, representing the Broad Front within the Unidad por Chile coalition. She was not elected, obtaining 22,154 votes, equivalent to 2.89% of the valid votes cast.
