= Carmen Hertz =

Chilean politician and lawyer

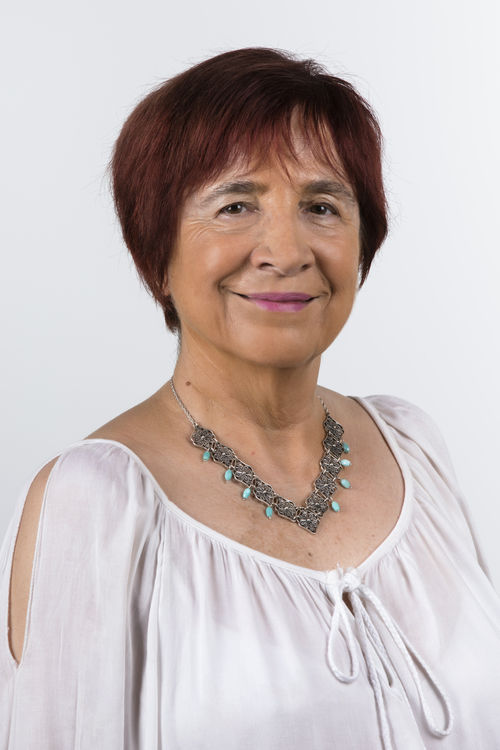

Member of the Chamber of Deputies
- Incumbent
- Assumed office 11 March 2018
- Constituency: District 8

Ambassador of Chile to Hungary
- In office 2006–2009

Personal details
- Born: Carmen Hertz Cádiz; 19 June 1945 (age 81) Santiago, Chile
- Party: Communist Party
- Children: Germán Berger Hertz
- Education: University of Chile
- Occupation: Lawyer, politician

Carmen Hertz Cádiz (born 19 June 1945) is a Chilean Communist Party politician and lawyer who participated in various institutions for the protection of human rights that arose as a result of the systematic violations committed during the dictatorship headed by Augusto Pinochet from 1973 to 1990. She worked with the Vicariate of Solidarity, the Social Aid Foundation of Christian Churches (FASIC), the National Corporation for Reparation and Reconciliation, and the Ministry of the Interior's Human Rights Program. She became the human rights director of the Ministry of Foreign Affairs after Chile's transition to democracy, and was elected to the Chamber of Deputies in 2018.

== Early life and education ==
Carmen Hertz was born into a right-wing family in Santiago on 19 June 1945. Her father, Germán Hertz Garcés, was a lawyer of German descent, active in the now-defunct Liberal Party. She spent the first years of her childhood mainly on the family farm in Carrascal (today in the commune Quinta Normal). She attended Andrew Carnegie College, a small elementary school that was near the family home on José Miguel Infante Street in Providencia. In her third year of humanities she entered Liceo 7, where she encountered new points of view.

She entered the Law School of the University of Chile, where she initially politically identified with the liberals, gradually moving to the left. In those years as a student, she was José Miguel Insulza's girlfriend. After graduating she joined the Revolutionary Left Movement (MIR), a political organization that vouched for political changes through armed revolution, in which she met her future husband. After the victory of Salvador Allende, on whose electoral campaign she had worked, Hertz decided to join the Communist Party (PC) in the late 1970s.

During the Popular Unity alliance, Hertz was a legal secretary of the council of the Agrarian Reform Corporation (1970–1973), which was chaired by the Minister of Agriculture, Jacques Chonchol. When her friend Carlos Berger – a lawyer and a communist journalist who had gone to Moscow for a year, and with whom she had maintained an active correspondence – returned to Chile in 1971, they immediately began a romantic relationship. Berger was commissioned to create the first left-wing youth magazine, Ramona. Then, after Orlando Millas was appointed Minister of Finance, Hertz became his press secretary in June 1972. In November, she gave birth to a son, Germán Berger Hertz.

== Murder of Carlos Berger ==
In late July 1973, the PC sent Berger to take over the communications of Chuqui Copper. The family left for Chuquicamata in August, and there, Berger took over as director of Radio El Loa and Hertz began working in the mining company's legal department. On 11 September, the day of the coup d'état, Berger was arrested after continuing radio broadcasts although the new authorities had ordered him to cease them. That night he was released, but hours later, the military raided the house and took him away. Berger was subjected to a drumhead court-martial that sentenced him to 60 days in jail for failing to comply with the order to stop transmissions during the day of the coup. On 17 October, Hertz, who was his lawyer, managed to have the remaining days of the sentence commuted to a fine. But the political prisoners who were held at Calama, including Berger, were taken away and brutally killed by members of the so-called Caravan of Death, an operation directed by Sergio Arellano Stark to eliminate political dissidents from the recently established military dictatorship.

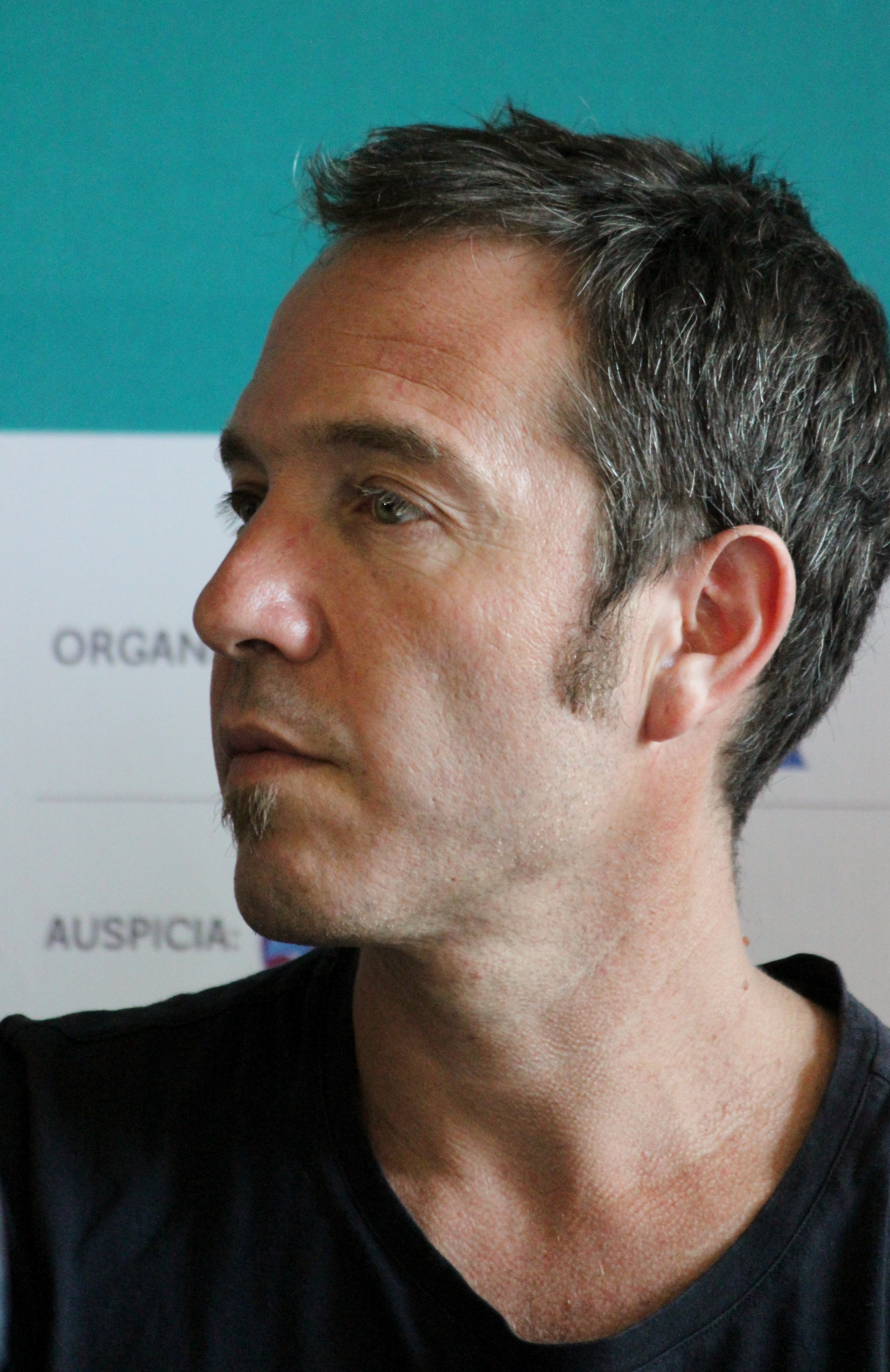
Germán Berger Hertz

The bodies were thrown into a clandestine grave on the way to San Pedro de Atacama and hidden from their relatives. Subsequently the bodies were removed by military order and thrown into the sea. Decades later, some bone fragments were found in the ditch, which allowed the identification of 18 of the 26 victims, among them Carlos Berger.

The death of her husband led Hertz to participate in various organizations dedicated to the defense of human rights, including the Vicariate of Solidarity, and later in the National Corporation for Reparation and Reconciliation. The story of her search for justice for Berger's murder was brought to the small screen by Andrés Wood in the miniseries Ecos del desierto. In it, Carmen as a young woman is played by María Gracia Omegna, and as an adult by Aline Küppenheim; Carlos is played by Francisco Celhay. Their son Germán became a filmmaker and journalist, and directed the documentary Mi vida con Carlos about his father's killing, which was nominated for four Goya Awards in 2010.

== Political career ==
With the return of democracy, Hertz participated in various government institutions. A member of the United Nations Observer Mission in El Salvador (ONUSAL), she was responsible for verifying that country's peace agreements. She was human rights advisor and legal director of the Ministry of Foreign Affairs from 1994 to 1998 – a position she resigned on 31 October of that year, when the Concertación government decided to take on the defense of Pinochet, who had been arrested in London on 16 October. She joined the Chilean delegation to the Rome Conference in 1997, which approved the Statute of the International Criminal Court. She was Chile's attaché to international organizations based in Geneva in 2003, a lawyer of the Ministry of the Interior's Human Rights Program from 2004 to 2006, ambassador to Hungary from 2006 to 2009, and in the latter year was appointed human rights director of the Ministry of Foreign Affairs.

She has written nonfiction books about her life and repression during Pinochet's regime.

Carmen Hertz was a candidate for national deputy for District 16 (which included the communes of Pudahuel, Quilicura, Colina, Lampa, and Tiltil) in the 2005 parliamentary election, but with 13,694 votes (8.27%), she was not elected. She was successful, however, in the 2017 election, in which she won a seat for District 8 (Cerrillos, Colina, Estación Central, Lampa, Maipú, Tiltil, Pudahuel, and Quilicura).

== Books ==
- Operación siglo XX: El atentado a Pinochet (1990), with journalist Patricia Verdugo, ISBN 9789563244250
- Operación Exterminio. La represión contra los comunistas chilenos (1973–1976) (2016), with Apolonia Ramírez and Manuel Salazar, ISBN 9789560008275
- La historia fue otra: Memorias (2017), ISBN 9789569545450
