= CODESUP =

Sustainable development corporation in Chile

Corporación para el Desarrollo Sustentable de Pudahuel (CODESUP)
- Company type: Organización Privada sin Fines de Lucro
- Founded: 7 March 2006
- Headquarters: Pudahuel, Chile
- Area served: Communal and social services
- Key people: Sergio Valdés, Director Ejecutivo Administrative Board: Johnny Carrasco, Presidente; Ricardo Lessman, Vice Presidente
- Website: codesup.cl

CODESUP is a private corporation in Pudahuel, Santiago, Chile, founded by local private companies of Pudahuel in order to aim for sustainable development in particular in social, economic and environmental areas.

== Structure of the corporation ==
As partners, CODESUP can count on many bodies in the commune, like almost all big companies and other organizations, corporations, schools, universities and trade unions. Its associates are:

- Automotores Gildemeister S.A. – importer Hyundai Chile
- Banquetería Amelia Correa Izquierdo & Hijos
- Bodenor Flexcenter – logistics parks
- Carmell Grupo Inmobiliario
- CBP Centro de Bodegaje Pudahuel
- Cecinas San Jorge S.A.
- Cial Alimentos / Consorcio industrial de alimentos S.A.
- El Bosque S.A. – promoter of projects like URBANYA
- Enea
- Empresas Melón S.A. – concrete
- Gaasa
- Hidronor Chile S.A. – recycling
- Hilton Garden Inn
- Lo Boza Parque Industrial – industrial park
- Lomas de Hidronor
- Praderas PDUC Ciudad Lo Aguirre
- SCL, Terminal Aéreo Santiago S.A. – operator of the International Airport Santiago de Chile

People:

- Johnny Carrasco
- Hans Hein
- Julio Fernández

== Services and projects ==
Generally, CODESUP works mostly through partnerships with various local or regional bodies, depending on the project. This can be done through own initiative and further integration of bigger partners, or above all through an intermediate role between the public and the private sector.

However, there is a great number of projects which CODESUP realizes on its own account, such as schooling, training and education projects in the fields of environment and business. Furthermore, it annually grants scholarships for theses in geography, economics and politics, which above all deal with local topics.

To be more specific, CODESUP integrates a network of institutions which dedicate themselves to sustainable local development. Of great importance is its integration in the Programa Santiago Emprende Norponiente (through Chile Emprende), composed by public services and which is destinated to fomento productivo (productive support) of small companies and people working on their own account. These public services consist mainly of the Servicio de Cooperación Técnica (SERCOTEC), the Servicio Nacional de Capacitación y Empleo (SENCE) and the Fondo de Solidaridad e Inversión Social (FOSIS). To these are added the municipalities of Pudahuel, Quilicura, Cerro Navia, Lo Prado and Quinta Normal, and many other associations such as the Asociación de Industrias del Area Norte de Santiago (Quilicura), the Asociación de Industrias de Quinta Normal (ASIQUINTA) and others of micro and small entrepreneurs. It works together with ProChile, a Chilean government agency specialized in the promotion of exports, and other academic and technical bodies with the overall goal of better monitoring the comuna Pudahuel.

Additionally, CODESUP maintains an international cooperation agreement with the Excelentísima Diputación Provincial de Cáceres, Extremadura, Spain, in the area of activities of superior formation in sustainable local administration and government, including Spanish and Chilean experts. The beneficiaries of these programmes are local leaders, professionals and functionaries of local authorities in Pudahuel. During 2007 and 2008 the focus was on the assistance on the implementation of the Agenda 21 in the comuna Pudahuel.
