= Cristián Labbé Martínez =

Chilean politician (born 1980)

Cristián Labbé
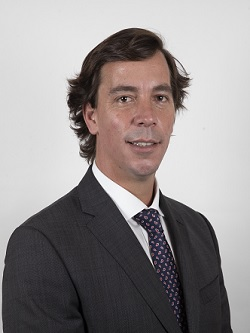

Member of the Chamber of Deputies
- In office 13 April 2021 – 11 March 2026
- Preceded by: Patricio Melero
- Constituency: District 8

Personal details
- Born: 6 January 1980 (age 46) Santiago, Chile
- Party: National Libertarian Party (2025–2026); Independent Democratic Union (–2025)
- Parent(s): Cristián Labbé Galilea; Isabel Margarita Martínez
- Education: Bernardo O'Higgins Military Academy
- Alma mater: Gabriela Mistral University (B.Sc in Marketing); UNIACC University (B.Sc in Public Administration); University of the Americas (Diplomate); Universidad Mayor (PgD)
- Occupation: Politician
- Profession: Publicist

Cristián Andrés Labbé Martínez (born 6 March 1980) is a Chilean politician and former athlete, who served as member of the Chamber of Deputies of Chile.

Initially affiliated with the Independent Democratic Union (UDI), Labbé Martínez gained national visibility for his security-oriented discourse and strong conservative positions. However, since 2025, he has redefined his political identity as libertarian, emphasizing security for individual freedoms, economic liberalism, and a reduced role for the state in both economic and cultural life.

Before entering politics, Labbé gained national recognition as a taekwondo competitor, representing Chile in international tournaments, and later as a contestant in the reality show, Mundos Opuestos, where he cultivated a public image centered on discipline, charisma, and competitiveness. His early media exposure provided him with a platform that later supported his transition into public service and electoral politics.

== Biography ==
Labbé was born into a politically prominent family in Santiago. His father, Cristián Labbé Galilea, is a retired colonel and former mayor of Providencia, widely known for his association with the military government of Augusto Pinochet. Labbé Martínez studied business and communications, and completed postgraduate studies in political marketing and public affairs.

Before entering politics, he developed a notable athletic career, representing Chile in taekwondo at the international level. His sports background —often associated with discipline, competitiveness, and perseverance— has remained a key element of his political branding, particularly in connection to messages of meritocracy and self-reliance.

In 2013, Labbé was a member of the sequel of the reality show, Mundos Opuestos.

== Political career ==
Labbé was elected to the Chamber of Deputies in the 2021 Chilean general election, representing District 8 in the Santiago Metropolitan Region, which includes communes such as Maipú and Estación Central. His campaign emphasized public security, respect for institutions, and support for police and armed forces, placing him squarely in the conservative, law-and-order wing of the Chilean right.

During his early years in Congress, he focused on legislation aimed at combating organized crime, strengthening the legal protection of security personnel, and restricting the symbolic rehabilitation of political violence. He also took public positions against what he described as the cultural influence of «victimhood narratives» and «ideological indoctrination» in public education.

Since 2025 Labbé has embraced conservative-libertarian identity, consolidating his long-standing emphasis on order and patriotism with a stronger commitment to individual liberty, free markets, and minimal state intervention. Drawing on thinkers like Friedrich Hayek and Ayn Rand, he views civic order as the natural consequence of individual freedoms safeguarded by robust security institutions and a firm defense of private property.

Aligned with this vision, Labbé has expressed support for Congressman Johannes Kaiser and the National Libertarian Party, viewing them as vehicles for defending «liberty» against both left-wing and right-wing statism. He distances himself from traditional party structures like the UDI, favoring programmatic alliances rooted in individual and national sovereignty.

In April 2026, he resigned from the National Libertarian Party due to differences with the party's president Johannes Kaiser.
