= Pepe Auth =

Chilean politician

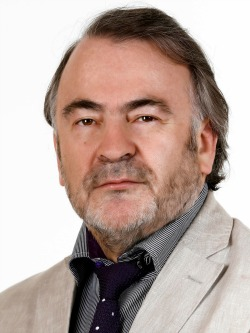

Member of the Chamber of Deputies of Chile
- In office 11 March 2018 – 11 March 2022
- Preceded by: Creation of the district
- Succeeded by: Claudia Mix
- Constituency: District 8
- In office 11 March 2010 – 11 March 2018
- Preceded by: Álvaro Escobar
- Succeeded by: Dissolution of the District

President of the Party for Democracy
- In office 10 May 2008 – 30 December 2009
- Preceded by: Sergio Bitar
- Succeeded by: Adriana Muñoz D'Albora

Ambassador of Chile at Sweden
- In office 8 September 2000 – April 2004
- Preceded by: José Goñi
- Succeeded by: Álvaro García Hurtado

Personal details
- Born: 6 March 1957 (age 69) Santiago, Chile
- Party: Party for Democracy (1988−2016); Radical Social Democrat Party (2016−2018); Radical Party (2018−2019)
- Parent(s): Raúl Auth; Joan Stewart
- Education: University of Chile (BA); School for Advanced Studies in the Social Sciences (MA)
- Occupation: Politician
- Profession: Sociologist

Pepe Auth Stewart (born 6 March 1957) is a Chilean politician commonly known for having served as deputy during the 2010s.
