= Monument to the Victory of Chacabuco =

Coordinates: 32°59′33″S 70°41′04″W

The Monument to the Victory of Chacabuco, also known as the Monument to the Battle of Chacabuco (truly To the Victory of Chacabuco), is a monument that commemorates the Battle of Chacabuco, which took place on February 12, 1817. It was designed by Héctor Román Latorre and built in 1971. It is 20 meters tall.

It is located in the General San Martín highway, close to Los Andes, in Colina commune.

It has an inscription in Spanish that says:

El 12 de febrero de 1817, el Ejército de Los Andes a las órdenes del General José de San Martín, libró aquí la batalla de Chacabuco, que condujo a la Independencia de Chile en este lugar, efectivos de la División del Centro, comandados por el Brigadier General Bernardo O'Higgins, derrotaron a los batallones de realistas al mando del Brigadier Rafael Maroto.

In English, this reads:

On February 12 of 1817, the Andes Liberator Army under the orders of General José de San Martín, held here the battle of Chacabuco, which lead to the Independence of Chile in this place, forces from the Center Division, commanded by Brigadier General Bernardo O'Higgins, defeated the royal battalions under the command of Brigadier Rafael Maroto.
