= Pablo Vidal =

Chilean politician (born 1983)

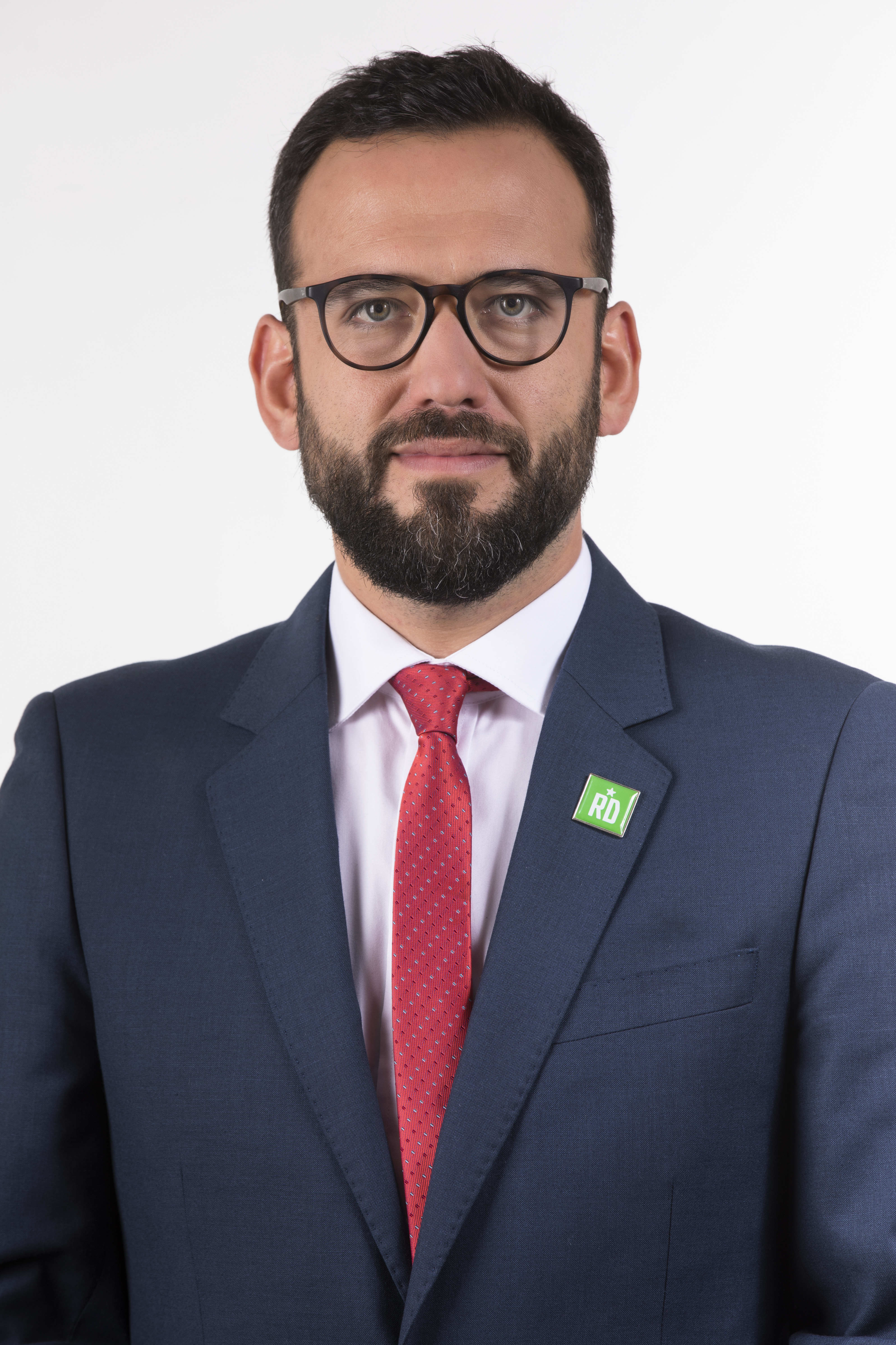
- Official portrait (2018)

Member of the Chamber of Deputies
- In office 11 March 2018 – 11 March 2022
- Preceded by: Creation of the district
- Constituency: District 8

Personal details
- Born: 24 June 1983 (age 43) Santiago, Chile
- Party: Democratic Revolution (2011−2020)
- Other political affiliations: Nueva Acción Universitaria (NAU) (2008−2011); New Deal (2020−2024)
- Education: Pontifical Catholic University of Chile (BA)
- Occupation: Politician
- Profession: Geographer

Pablo Esteban Vidal Rojas (born 24 June 1983) is a Chilean politician and geographer who served as a member of the Chamber of Deputies of Chile during the 2018−2022 period.
