= Lycée Antoine-de-Saint-Exupéry de Santiago =

French international school in Chile

Coordinates: 33.3943°S 70.5827°W

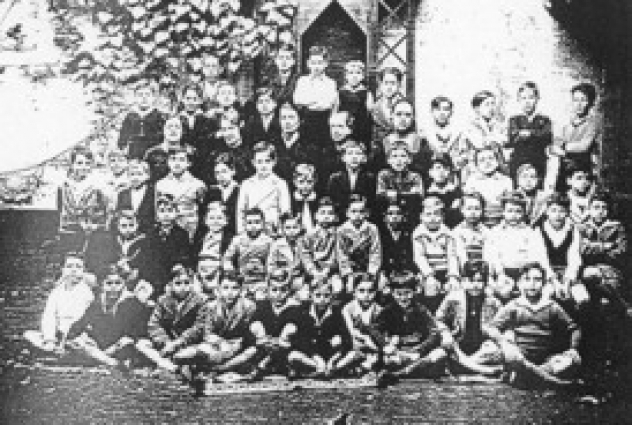

Lycée Français Antoine-de-Saint-Exupéry de Santiago (LAFASE) is a French international school in Vitacura and in Colina, both in Greater Santiago. It is named after Antoine de Saint-Exupéry.

The school serves levels maternelle (preschool) through lycée (senior high school). It opened on 5 September 1959. The Chamisero campus had the first stone laid in May 2012. The campus officially opened on May 21, 2013 although the maternelle opened in February of that year.
