= Iberoamerican University of Science and Technology (Chile) =

- Universidad Iberoamericana de Ciencias y Tecnología
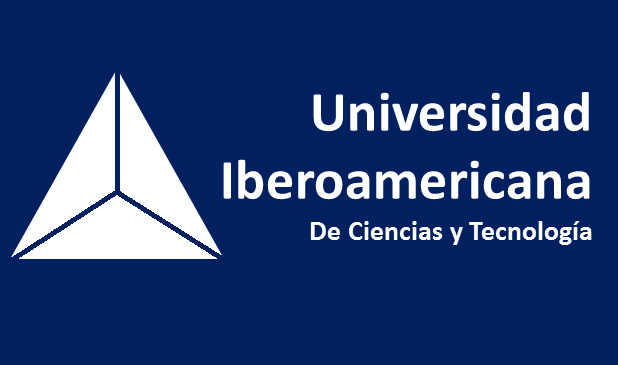
- Type: private
- Established: 17 Abril 1989
- President: Félix Viveros Díaz
- Location: Santiago, RM, Chile
- Campus: Campus Casa Central
- Website: www.uiberoamericana.cl

The Iberoamerican University of Science and Technology or UIBERO (in the past UNICIT) is a private university Chilean accredited by the National Commission of Accreditation (CNA-Chile). It finds situated in the city of Santiago of Chile.

In 2016, the ránking of AméricaEconomía situated it in the 47th place of a total of 57 universities considered, whereas the ránking Webometrics situated it in the place 74th place of a total of 79 Chilean universities considered.

== History ==
The university was founded on 17 April 1989, by the professor normalista, graduate in education of the Catholic University of Chile and employer Filomena Narváez Elgueta.

On 1 April 1991, the Ministry of Education authorises the careers of Agronomy, Veterinary Medicine, Engineering in Foods, Commercial Engineering, Civil Engineering in Electronics, Forest Engineering and Contador Auditor. During this first stage, the university was examined by the University Austral, University of Concepción and University of Talca, explaining ademas with the support of the University of Tennessee.

In June 1996 created the magazine Witnesses University like space of opinion, discussion and diffusion of the institution.

In April 1998 inaugurated the building Tennessee, central headquarters of the university, where concentrate laboratories, rooms of classes and administrative units of the institution.

On 15 January 2004, after the presentation in front of the Upper Council of Education, delivered the status of Autonomous University.

In 2005, the National Commission of Accreditation, accredited to the University in the Areas of Institutional Management and Teaching of Pregrado by a valid term until 28 January 2011.

In December 2013, during the retoría of Sergio Becerra Ovalle, the house of studies lost the accreditation when the National Commission of Accreditation dictated his last institutional certifications of the year.

On 13 January 2016, the university signs an agreement with the Private University San Juan Bautista of Peru.

=== Rectors ===
The rectors from his foundation until the day of today have been the following:

Number	Name	Period
I	José Galmez de Pablo	1989-1994
II	Filomena Narváez Elgueta	1994-1998
III	Fernando Monckeberg Barros	1998-1999
IV	Juan José Villavicencio	1999-2004
V	Juan Tosso Torres	2005-2009
IV	Carlos Pereira Alvornoz	2009-2013
VII	Sergio Becerra Ovalle	2013-2014
VIII	Mario Jarpa Gibert	2014
IX	Félix Viveros Díaz	2014 - Actuality

=== Professors stood out ===
- Iván Palavicino Hernández ːEx Dean of the Faculty of Natural Resources and Sciences Silvoagropecuarias and educational of bovine medicine.
- Walter Von Frey: Educational of reproduction, gynaecology and veterinary obstetrics.
- Frederick Ahumada: Ex Dean of the Faculty of Natural Resources and Sciences Silvoagropecuarias and educational of veterinary pharmacology.
- Roberto Parada Navarro: Ex Director of the School of Veterinary and educational Medicine of toxicology and animal physiology.

== Organisation ==
The university organises around five academic faculties.

== See also ==
- Annex:Universities of Chile
