= Lampa, Chile =

Lampa
- City and Commune
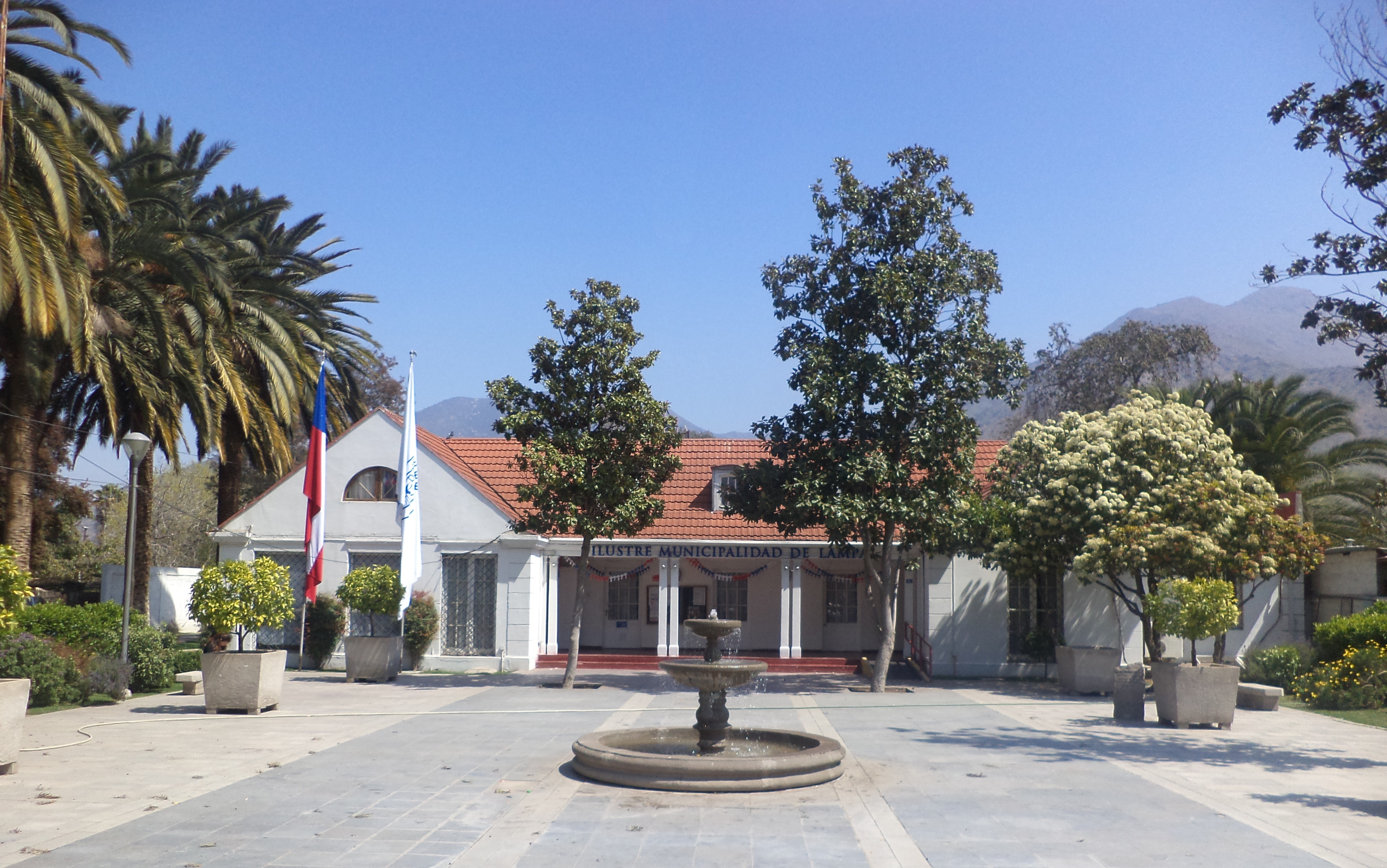
- City Hall

- Coat of arms Location in Chile
- Coordinates (city): 33°17′S 70°54′W
- Country: Chile
- Region: Santiago Metro.
- Province: Chacabuco
- Founded: 1888

Government
  - Type: Municipality
  - Alcalde: Graciela Ortúzar Novoa (RN)

Area
  - Total: 451.9 km^{2} (174.5 sq mi)
- Elevation: 496 m (1,627 ft)

Population (2002 Census)
  - Total: 40,228
  - Density: 89.02/km^{2} (230.6/sq mi)
  - Urban: 28,229
  - Rural: 11,999
- Demonym: Lampino

Sex
  - Men: 20,571
  - Women: 19,657
- Time zone: UTC-4 (CLT)
  - Summer (DST): UTC-3 (CLST)
- Area code: 56 +
- Website: Municipality of Lampa

Lampa is a Chilean commune and city in the Chacabuco province, Santiago Metropolitan Region. Lampa is situated near the Chicauma mountain range, part of which was added to the La Campana National Park.

Lampa (in Quechua: Lampa, ‘the miner’s shovel’) is a community located in the rural zone northwest of Santiago, Chile. It belongs to the administrative providence of Chacabuco, in the Metropolitan Region of Santiago.

According to the census of 2017, Lampa has a population of 201,034 inhabitants, being the community with the greatest growth in comparison with the census before (2002), when it only had 40228 inhabitants.

In the trimester of the year 2016, Lampa was selected as first place as the community with the most sales in living area, reaching 28%, with respect to Colina and Puente Alto.

The community of Lampa adjoins the communities of Til Til, Colina, Pudahuel, Curacaví, Quilicura and Quilpué.

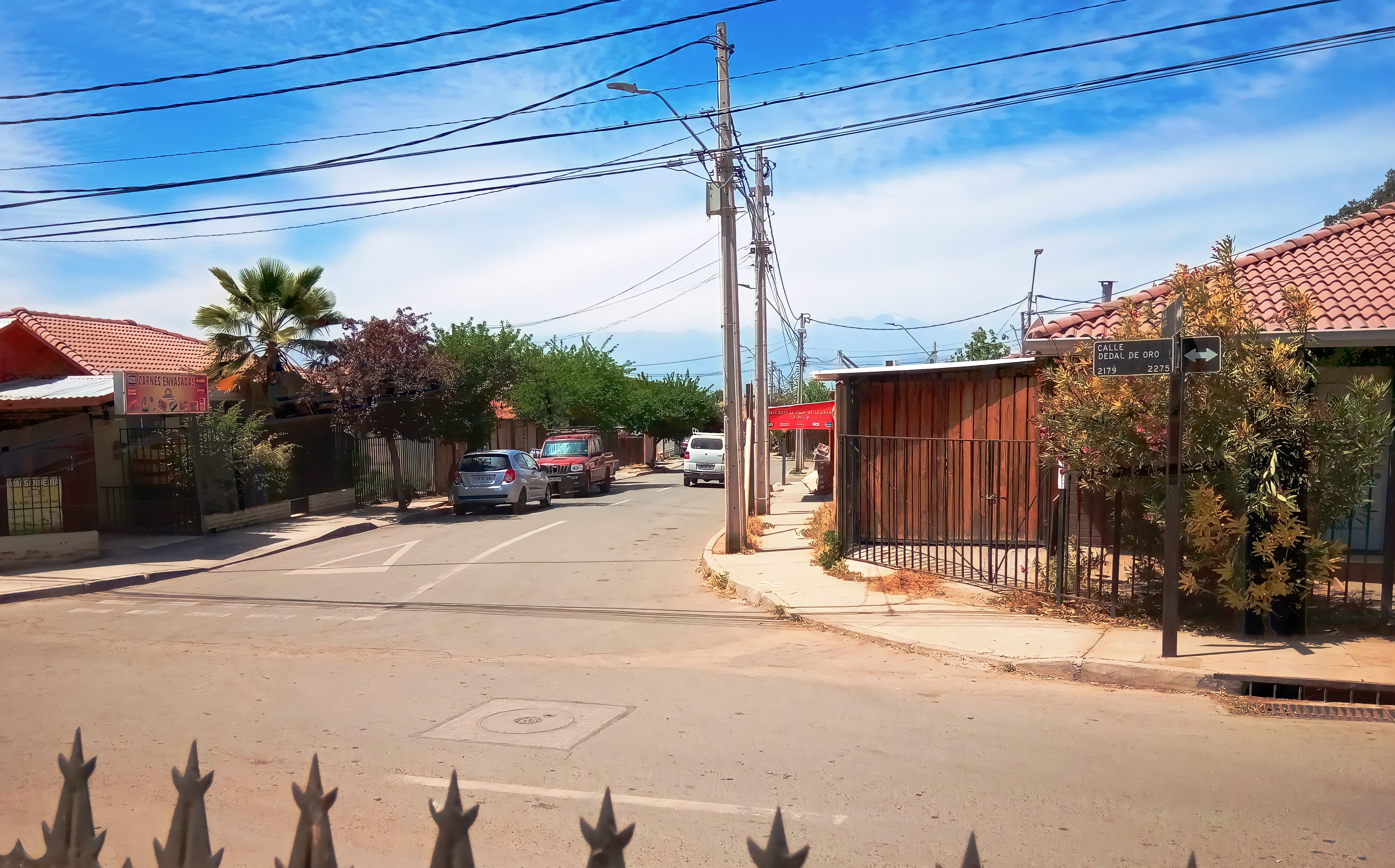
Larapinta.

== Demographics ==
Lampa appears in the official census records as early at 1788. According to the 2002 census of the National Statistics Institute, Lampa spans an area of 451.9 km^{2} (174 sq mi) and has 40,228 inhabitants (20,571 men and 19,657 women). Of these, 28,229 (70.2%) lived in urban areas and 11,999 (29.8%) in rural areas. The population grew by 60.7% (15,195 persons) between the 1992 and 2002 censuses.

It is a community where the land, is for the most part plains, with certain rolling hills in the northern part. Like most of the communities in the region it has a Mediterranean type of vegetation, resulting in a green landscape almost year-round, even though in the summer there tend to be hot spots. The climate is for the most part is a temperate, Mediterranean climate even though in the zone there are registered extremes throughout the majority of the region. For that reason it can reach temperatures below 0 °C in winter at the lowest, with frequent frosts, and in summer it can reach 30 °C. In the year 2013, Lampa was the coldest community of the Metropolitan Region of Santiago, reaching -8.4 °C. The commerce is gradually progressing, above all in downtown, which is very close to the Autopista Central and is connected by highway Américo Vespucio Express and Costanera Norte with all the neighborhoods of the Great Santiago. Demographically, it is a growing community, more and more housing complexes are built due to its proximity to Santiago, Chile through the Autopista Central, Costanera Norte and Amémerico Vespucio Norte Express. Soon the Highway Norponiente will be built which will connect Cerro Navia with Lampa from the Enlace Carrascal to the Costanera Sur.

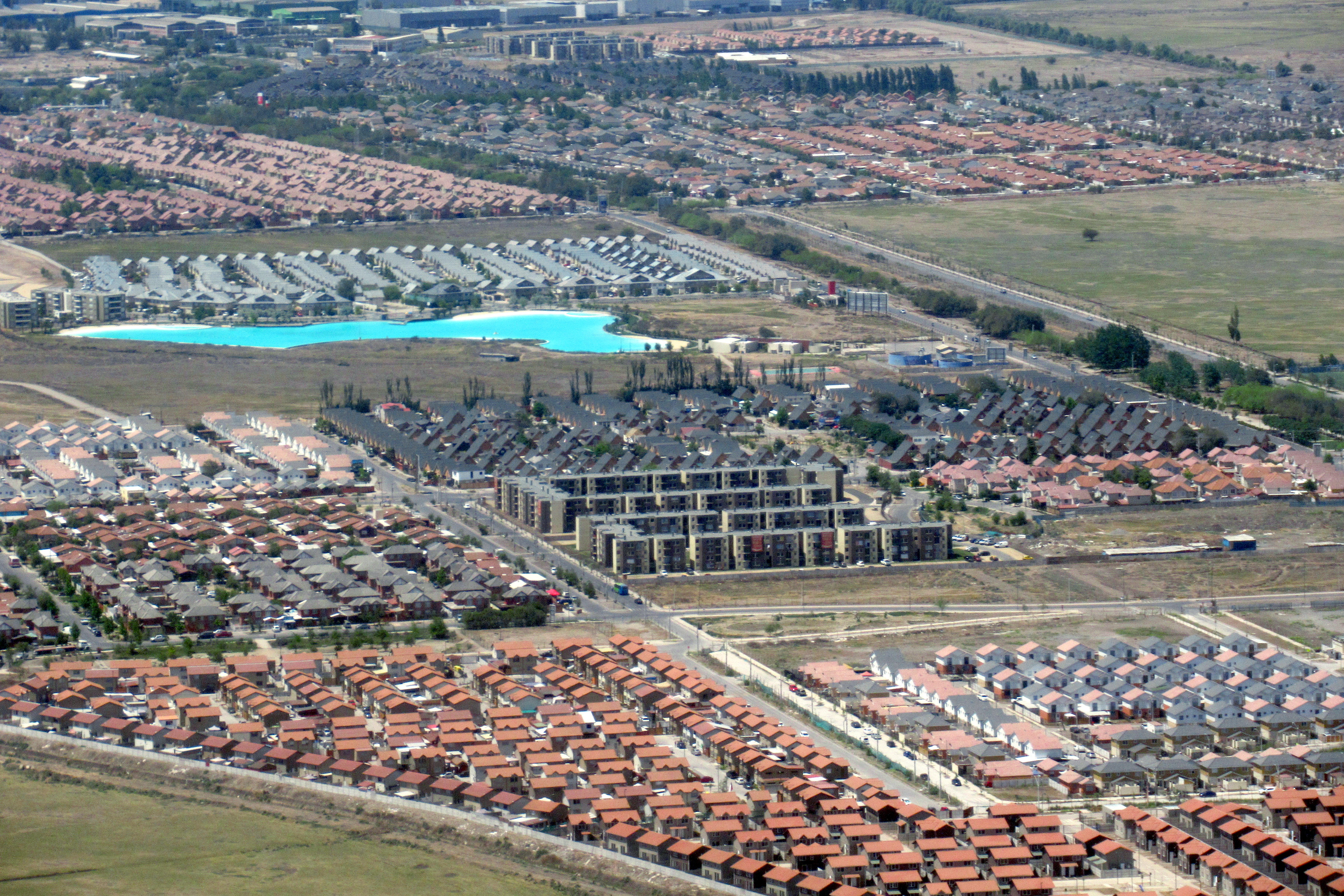
Valle Grande, Lampa

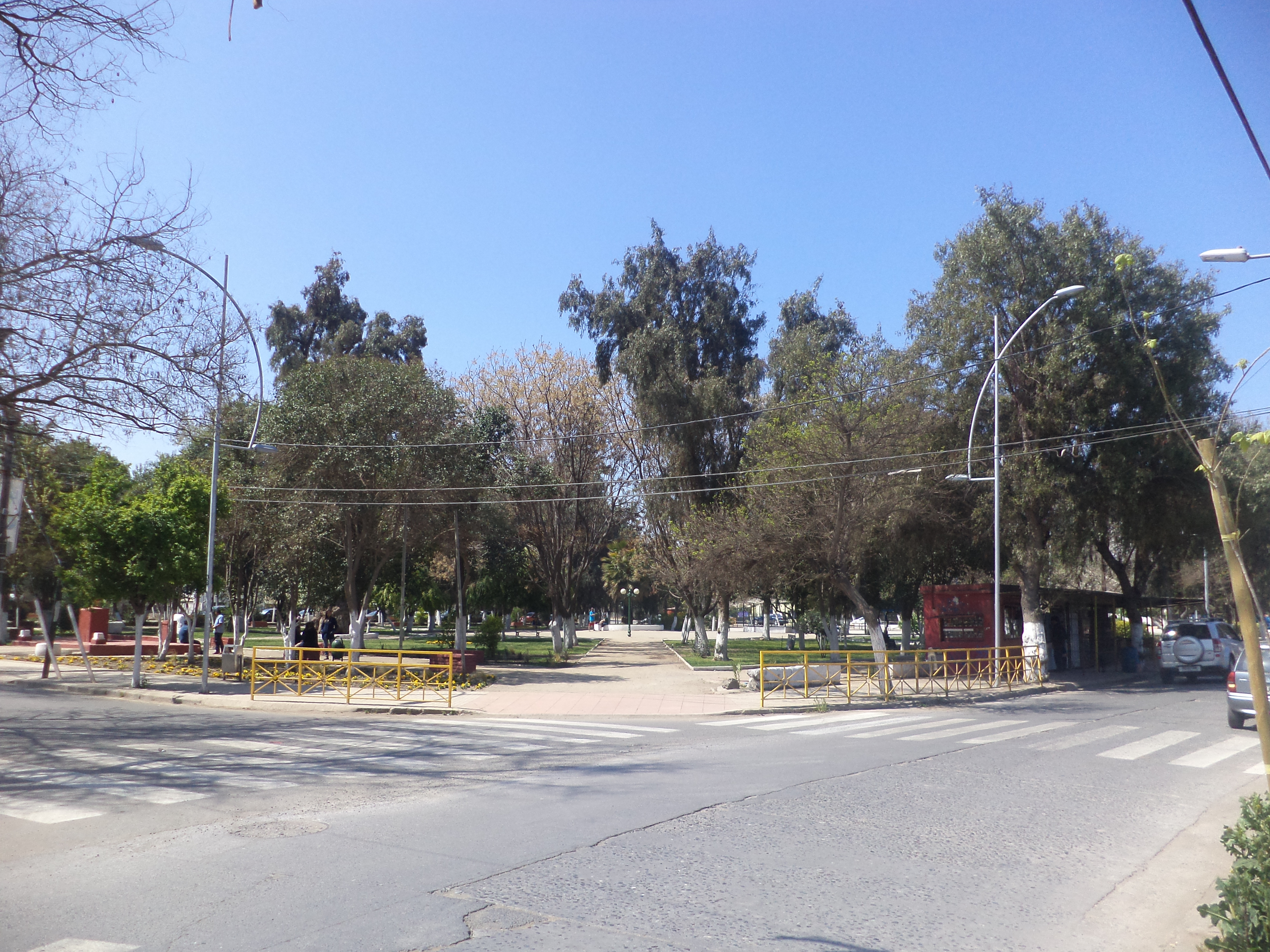
Plaza de Lampa

== Administration ==
As a commune, Lampa is a third-level administrative division of Chile administered by a municipal council, headed by an alcalde who is directly elected every four years. The 2012-2016 alcalde is Graciela Ortúzar Novoa (RN).

Lampa belongs to the Electoral District number eight and to the seventh Senatorial District (Santiago Poniente.) It is represented in the Chamber of Deputies of Chile by the deputies Joaquín Lavín León de la IDU, Gabriel Silber Romo del CDP, Pepe Auth Stewart of PRSD, Patricio Melero Abaroa of the IDU, Claudia Mix Jiménez of Citizen Power, Mario Desbordes Jiménez of NR, Carmen Hertz Cádiz of the PCCh and Pbalo Vidal Rojas of DR. At the same time, it is represented in the Senate by the senators Guido Girardi Lavín of PPD and Andrés Allamand of NR. The well-known municipality of Lampa is directed by the mayor Graciela Ortúzar Novoa (NR), who is advised by the councilors:

- Juan Amigo Astudillo (IND)
- Rodrigo Plaza Muñoz (PDC)
- Carmen Gloria Ruminot Jorquera (UDI)
- Felipe González Pino (IND)
- Marcos Álvarez Tobar (PPD)
- Marcelo Jaque Peña (PRI)

The regional intendant, appointed by the president, is Fernando Echeverría.

Within the electoral divisions of Chile, Lampa is represented in the Chamber of Deputies by Mr. Patricio Melero (UDI) and Mr. Gabriel Silber (PDC) as part of the 16th electoral district, (together with Colina, Tiltil, Quilicura and Pudahuel). The commune is represented in the Senate by Guido Girardi Lavín (PPD) and Jovino Novoa Vásquez (UDI) as part of the 7th senatorial constituency (Santiago-West).

Mayors of Lampa

- Graciela Ortuzar Novoa (2008- 2012) (2012 - 2016) (2016 - current)
- Carlos Escobar Paredes (1992-1996) (1996-2000) (2000-2004) (2004-2008)
- Jose Raul Rodriguez Rodriguez (1989-1992)
- Mario Aguilera Valenzuela (1987-1988)
- Jorge Lira Montes (1989)
