= Quilicura =

- Commune
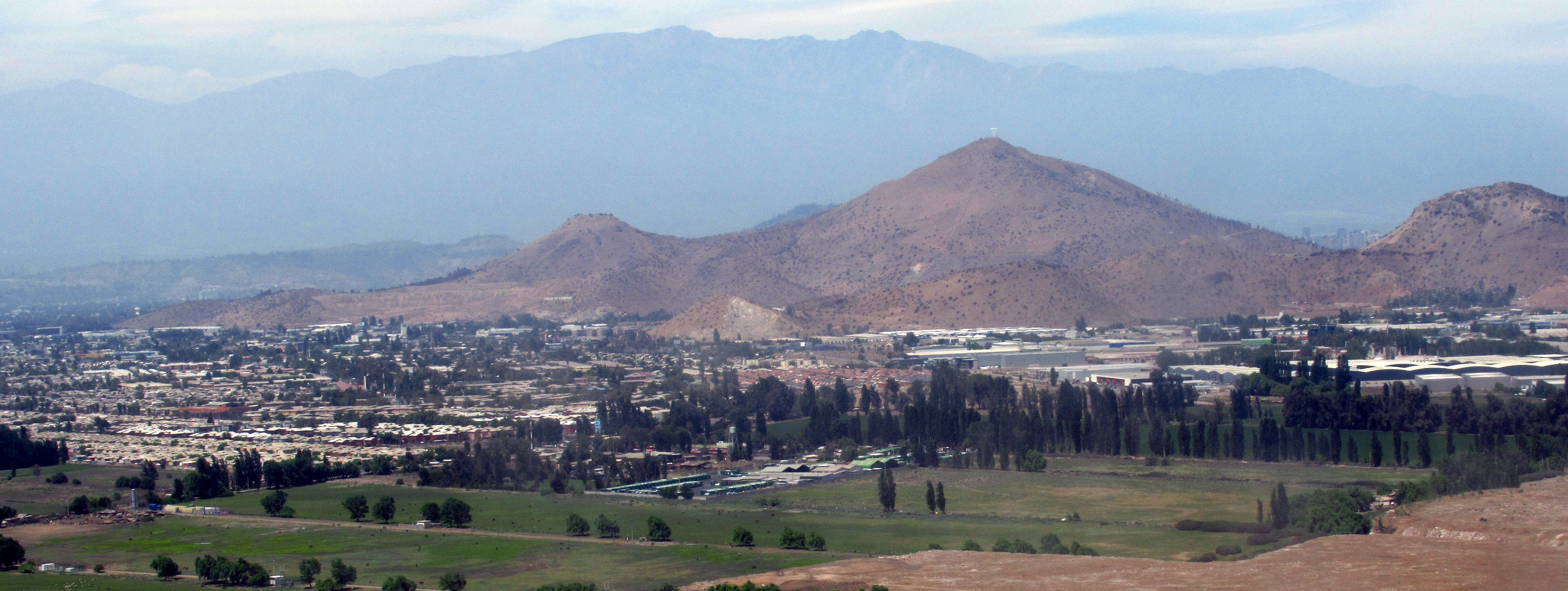
- Quilicura and Renca Hill

- Flag Coat of arms Location of Quilicura in Greater Santiago Location in Chile
- Coordinates (city): 33°22′S 70°44′W
- Country: Chile
- Region: Santiago Metropolitan
- Province: Santiago
- Established: 1902

Government
  - Type: Municipality
  - Alcalde: Paulina Bobadilla Navarrete (Ind/FA)

Area
  - Commune: 57.5 km^{2} (22.2 sq mi)

Population (2024)
  - Commune: 205,624
  - Density: 3,580/km^{2} (9,260/sq mi)
  - Urban: 205,167
  - Rural: 457
- Website: Municipality of Quilicura

Quilicura (/kɪliˈkʊərə/ KIL-i-KOOR-ə; Spanish pronunciation: [kiliˈkuɾa]) is a commune in Santiago, in Santiago Province in the Santiago Metropolitan Region in Chile. It has 205,624 inhabitants.

Founded in 1901, it was originally a satellite town on what were then the outskirts of the city of Santiago. In recent times, ongoing urban sprawl has quickly urbanized the area, transforming it from what was once prime agricultural land into an integrated part of the Santiago metropolitan area.

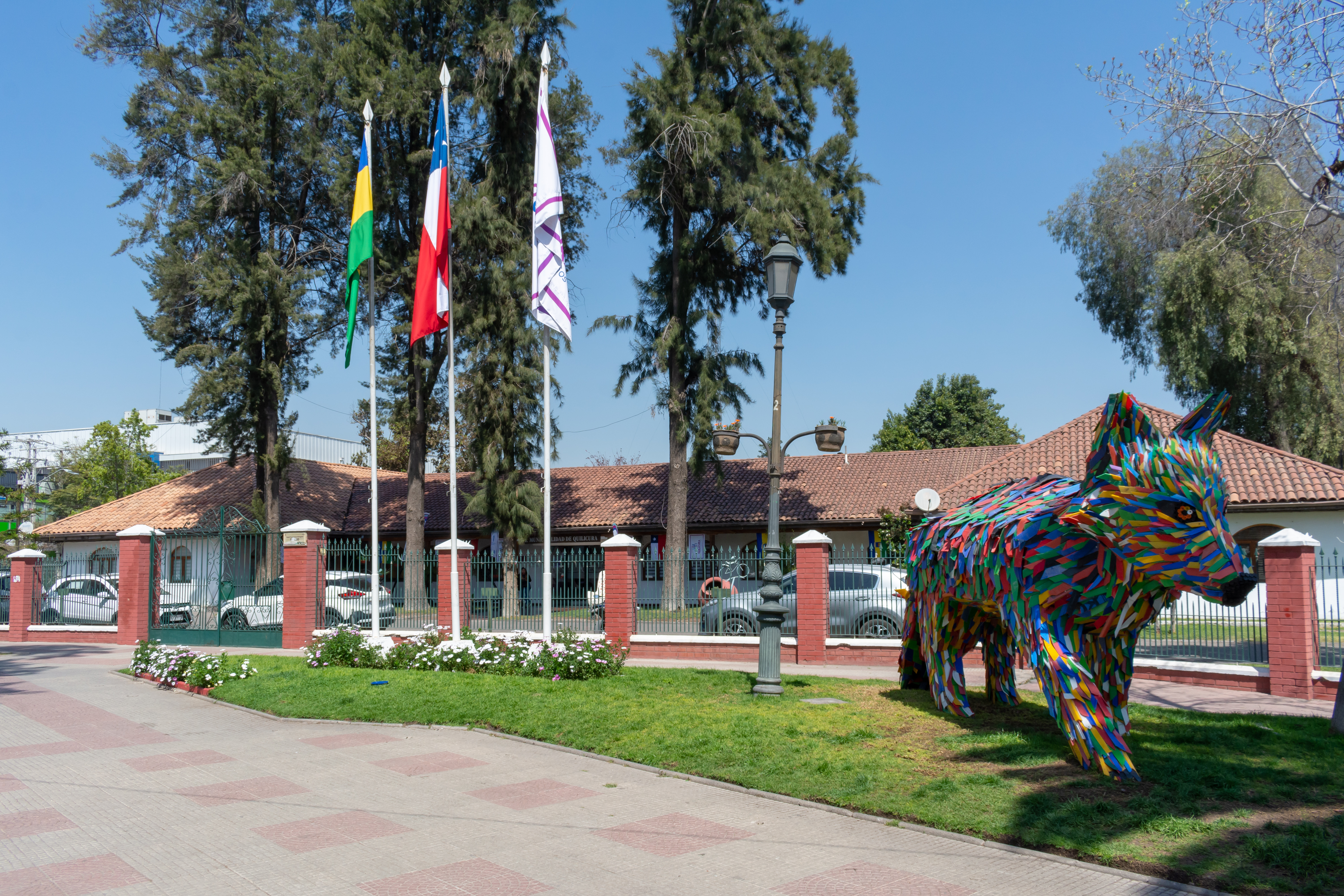
City hall

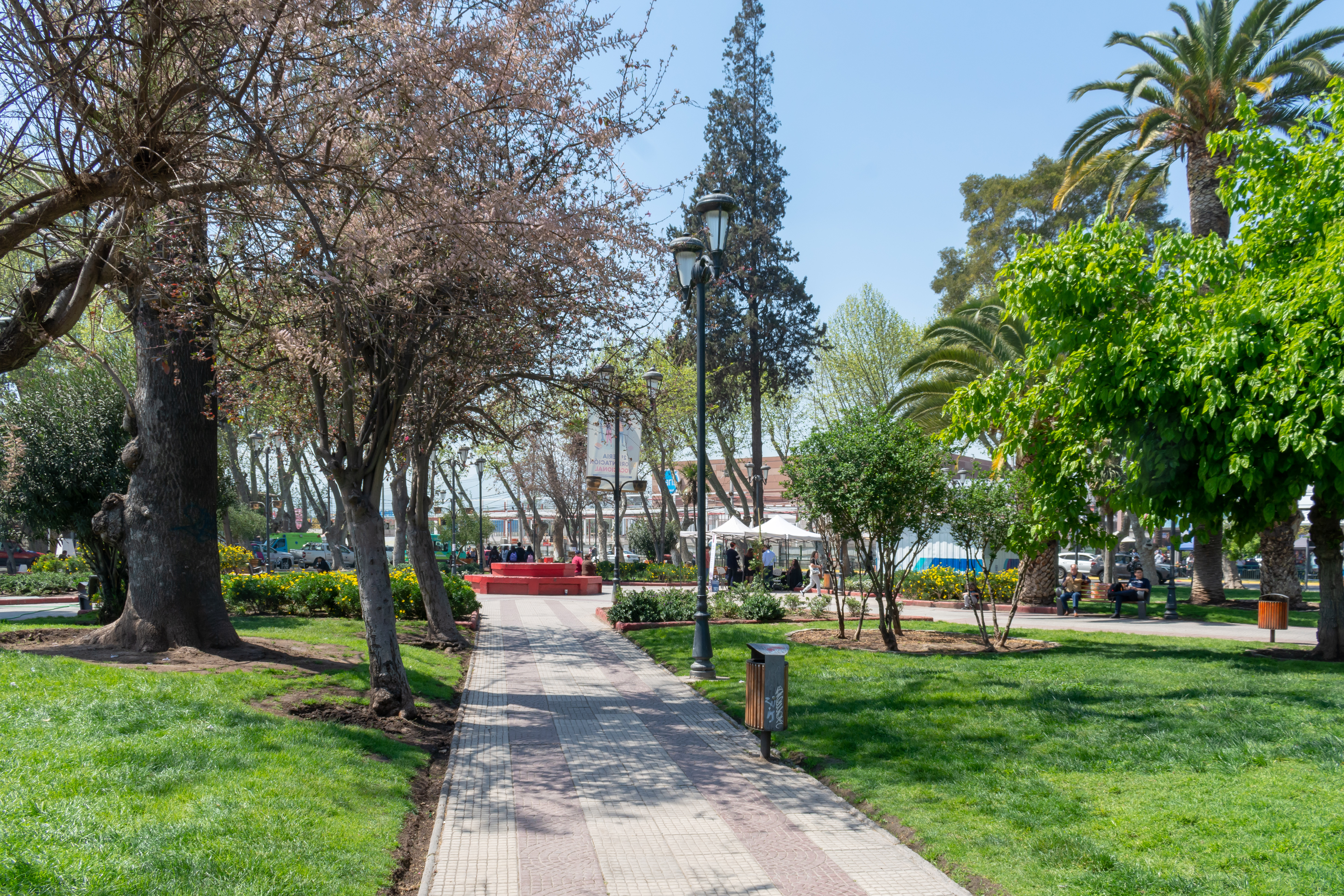
Plaza de Quilicura

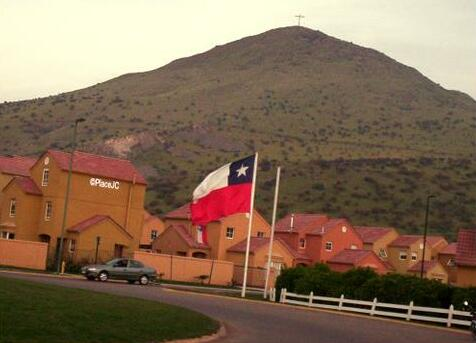
Valle Lo Campino neighborhood. Cerro Renca is in the background.

== Etymology ==
The origin of the name Quilicura is from the Mapuche language Mapudungun and comes from the words kila meaning three and kura meaning stone. The "Three Stones" are the three hills which separate the area and form the border with Renca.

== Geography ==
Quilicura is located in Santiago Province, Santiago Metropolitan Region, at the northwestern edge of Chile's capital Santiago. It borders Renca to the south (naturally separated by Renca Hill), Pudahuel to the west, Huechuraba and Conchalí to the east, and Lampa and Colina to the north.

Quilicura has relatively little green space compared to wealthier neighborhoods in the city, as it remains a predominantly industrial area. A Google data center operates in the area.

== Administration ==
As a commune, Quilicura is a third-level administrative division of Chile administered by a municipal council, headed by a mayor who is directly-elected every four years. The 2024-2028 mayor is Paulina Bobadilla Navarrete (Ind/FA). The communal council has the following members:

- Daniela San Martin Pizarro (Ind/PAVP)
- Claudio Sáez Belmar (RN)
- Mario Muñoz Chacón (REP)
- Nicolás Quiroz Venegas (PAVP)
- Leslie Pérez Jiménez (PDG)
- Gonzalo López Pizarro (PH)
- Alexandra Arancibia Olea (PL)
- Danae García Ibarra (Ind/FA)
- Daniela Cuevas Fuentes (PCCh)
- Sebastián Guerrero Pradenas (PPD)

Within the electoral divisions of Chile, Quilicura is part of electoral district No. 8 together with the commune of Colina, Lampa, Pudahuel, Maipú, Til Til, Cerrillos and Estación Central. On the other hand, the commune belongs to the VII Senatorial District that represents the entire Metropolitan Region of Santiago.

== Demographics ==
As of the 2024 census, the population is 205,624, of which 48.5% are males, and 51.5% are females. People aged under 15 years old make up 19.1% of the population, and people aged 65 years old and over make up 8.7%. 99.8% of the population is urban, and 0.2% is rural.

Historical population

Year	Pop.	±% p.a.
1875	2,607	—
1885	2,095	−2.16%
1895	1,756	−1.75%
1907	2,478	+2.91%
1920	3,868	+3.48%
1930	2,892	−2.87%
1940	3,178	+0.95%

Year	Pop.	±% p.a.
1952	4,741	+3.39%
1970	11,397	+4.99%
1982	22,605	+5.87%
1992	41,121	+6.17%
2002	126,518	+11.89%
2017	210,410	+3.45%
2024	205,624	−0.33%

Source: INE, Memoria Chilena

In 2005, the regional quality of life index for Quilicura was rated at a medium level of 72.53, ranking 34th out of 52. In 2003, the commune's Human Development Index was recorded at 0.782, placing it 19th out of 341.

In 2011, the average annual household per capita income was estimated at US$39,302 (PPP).

=== Ethnic minorities ===
As of the 2024 census, Indigenous peoples make up 8.4% of the population, and Afro-Chileans make up 1.7%.

In recent years, Quilicura has become home of a large Haitian community.

=== Religion ===
As of the 2024 census, 68.7% of the population over 15 years old are Christians (49.4% Catholics, 15.8% Evangelicals or Protestants, and 3.5% other branches), 0.1% are Jews, 0.1% are Muslims, 0.1% are Buddhists, <0.1% are Hinduists, 0.6% are adrehents of other religions, and 30.3% are irreligious.

=== Immigration ===
As of the 2024 census, immigrants make up 13.3% of the population – 9.0% are from South America, 4.2% from North America, 0.1% from Europe, 0.1% from Asia, <0.1% from Africa, and <0.1% from Oceania.

== Transport ==
Quilicura is located about 12 km from Santiago's international airport and is served by the Américo Vespucio Norte Highway as well as the Pan-American Highway. RED public buses connect Quilicura to the centre of Santiago and run frequently in both directions. The first phase of the Santiago Metro Line 3 connecting the commune with the rest of the network was completed on 22 January 2019, with phase 2 being completed in 2023. Currently, the closest metro station to Quilicura is Los Libertadores which is the northern terminus of Line 3.

== Notable people ==
- Carmen Romo Sepúlveda
