= Pudahuel =

- Commune
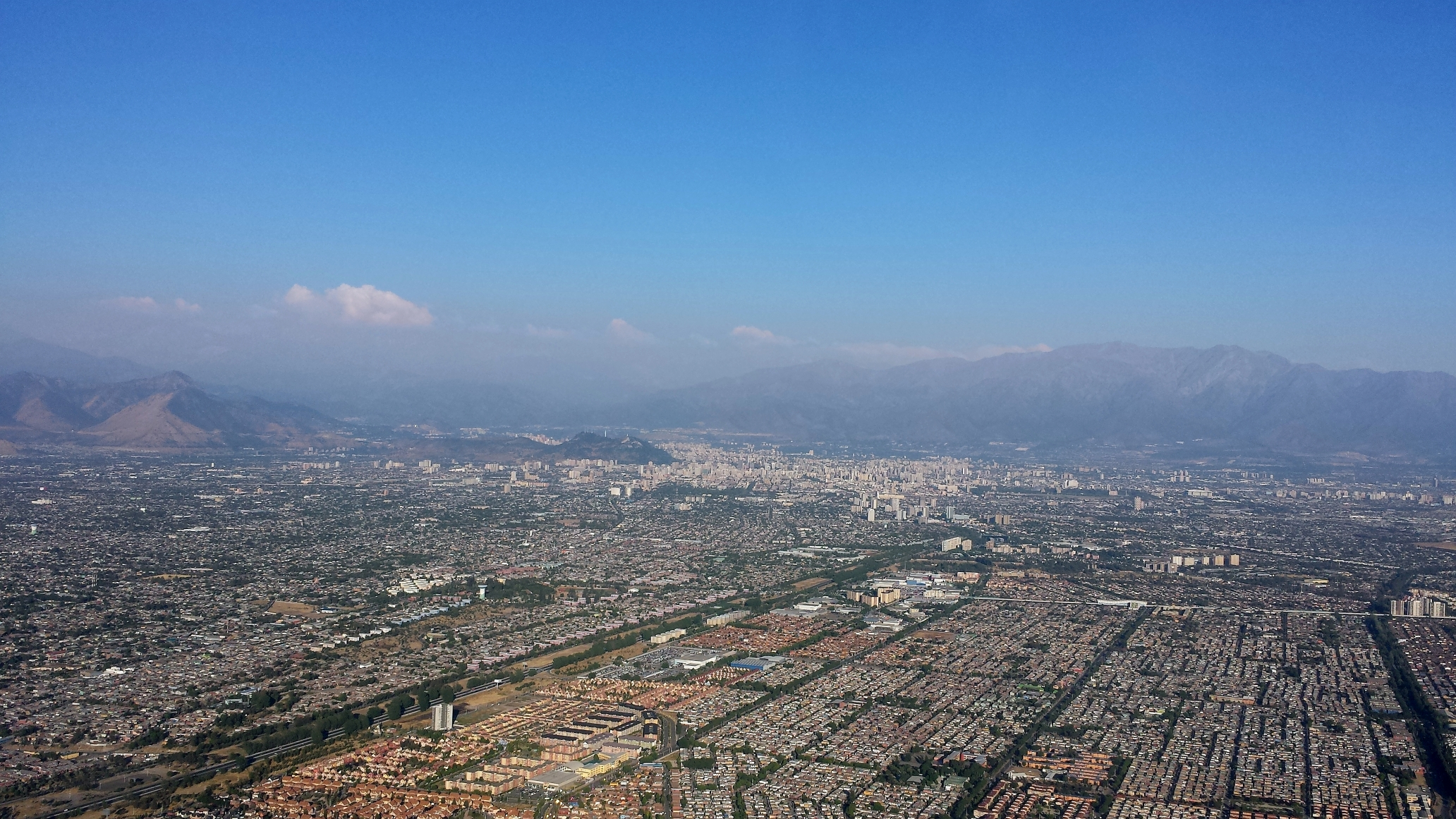
- Panoramic view of Pudahuel

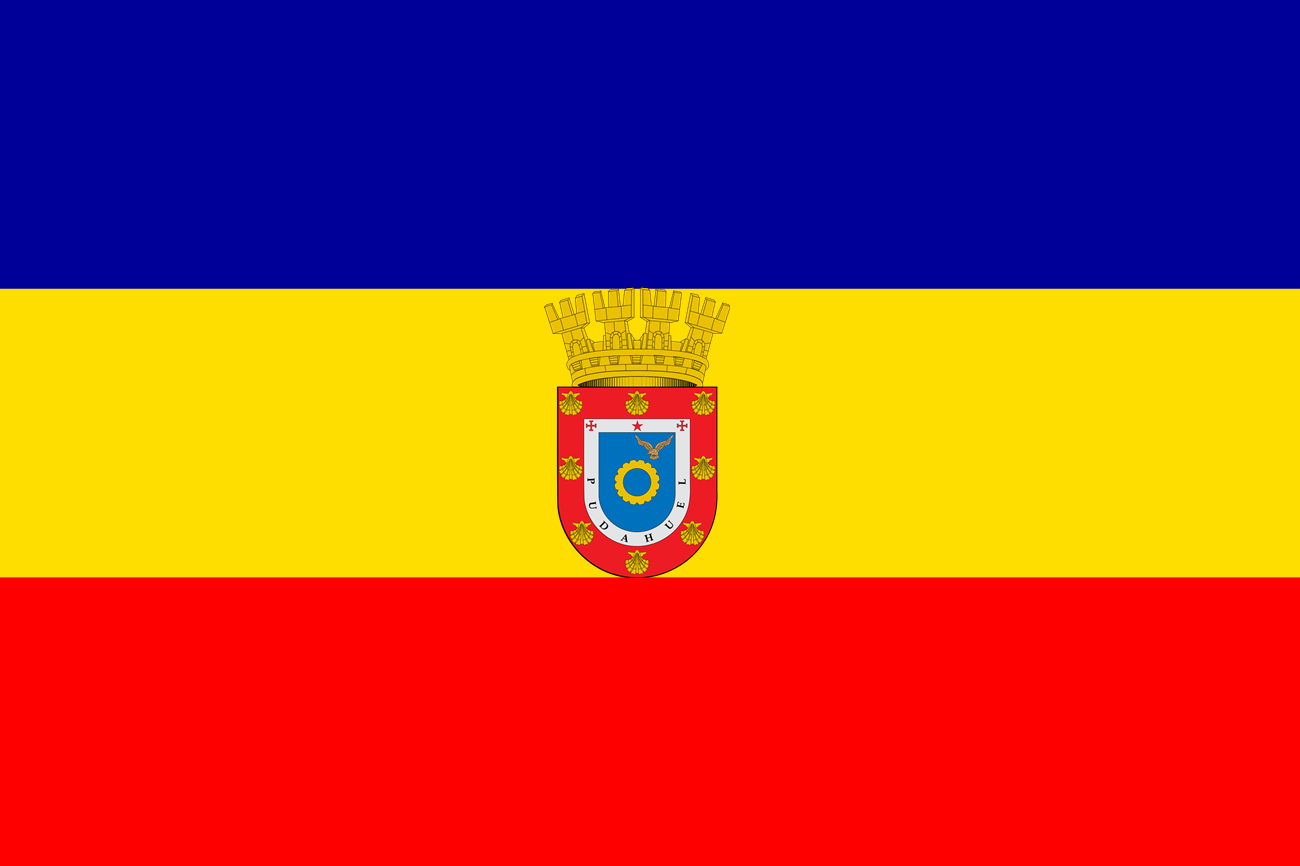
- Flag Coat of arms Location of Pudahuel in Greater Santiago Location in Chile
- Coordinates (city): 33°27′S 70°46′W
- Country: Chile
- Region: Santiago Metropolitan
- Province: Santiago
- Established: 25 February 1897

Government
  - Type: Municipality
  - Alcalde: Ítalo Bravo Lizana (PI)

Area
  - Commune: 197.4 km^{2} (76.2 sq mi)

Population (2024)
  - Commune: 227,820
  - Density: 1,154/km^{2} (2,989/sq mi)
  - Urban: 221,152
  - Rural: 6,668
- Time zone: UTC-4 (CLT)
  - Summer (DST): UTC-3 (CLST)
- Area code: 56 +
- Website: Municipality of Pudahuel

Pudahuel (Spanish pronunciation: [puðaˈwel], Mapudungun "place of pools/water" or "place where seagulls gather") is a commune of Greater Santiago, in Santiago Province in the Santiago Metropolitan Region in Chile. It has 227,820 inhabitants.

Santiago's Arturo Merino Benítez International Airport is located in Pudahuel.

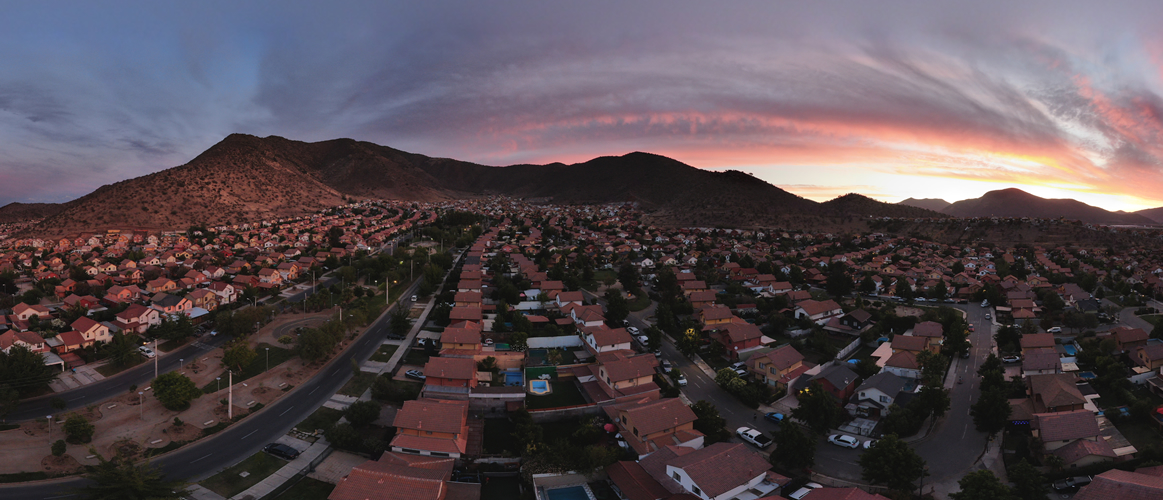
Ciudad de los Valles neighborhood

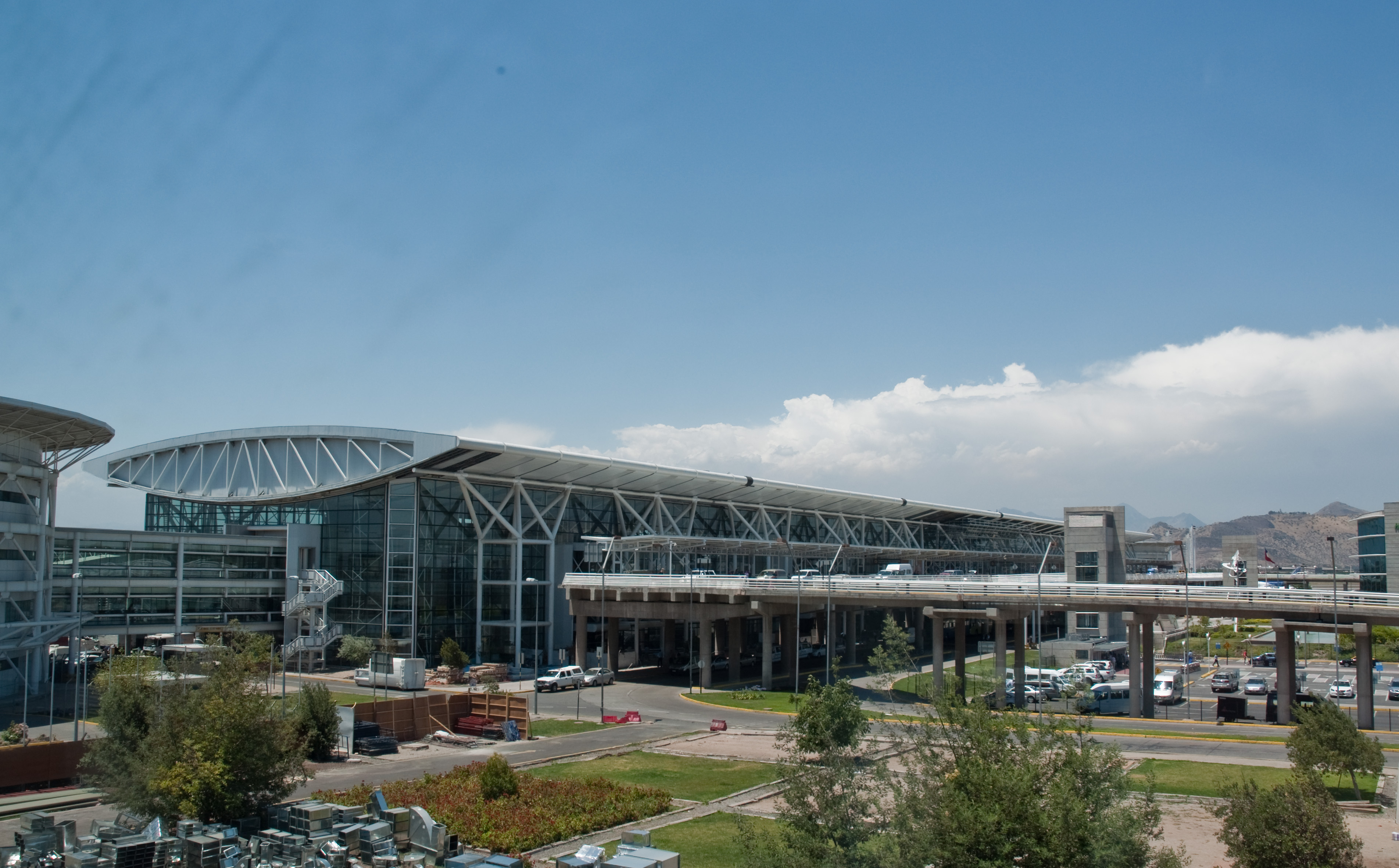
Arturo Merino Benítez International Airport

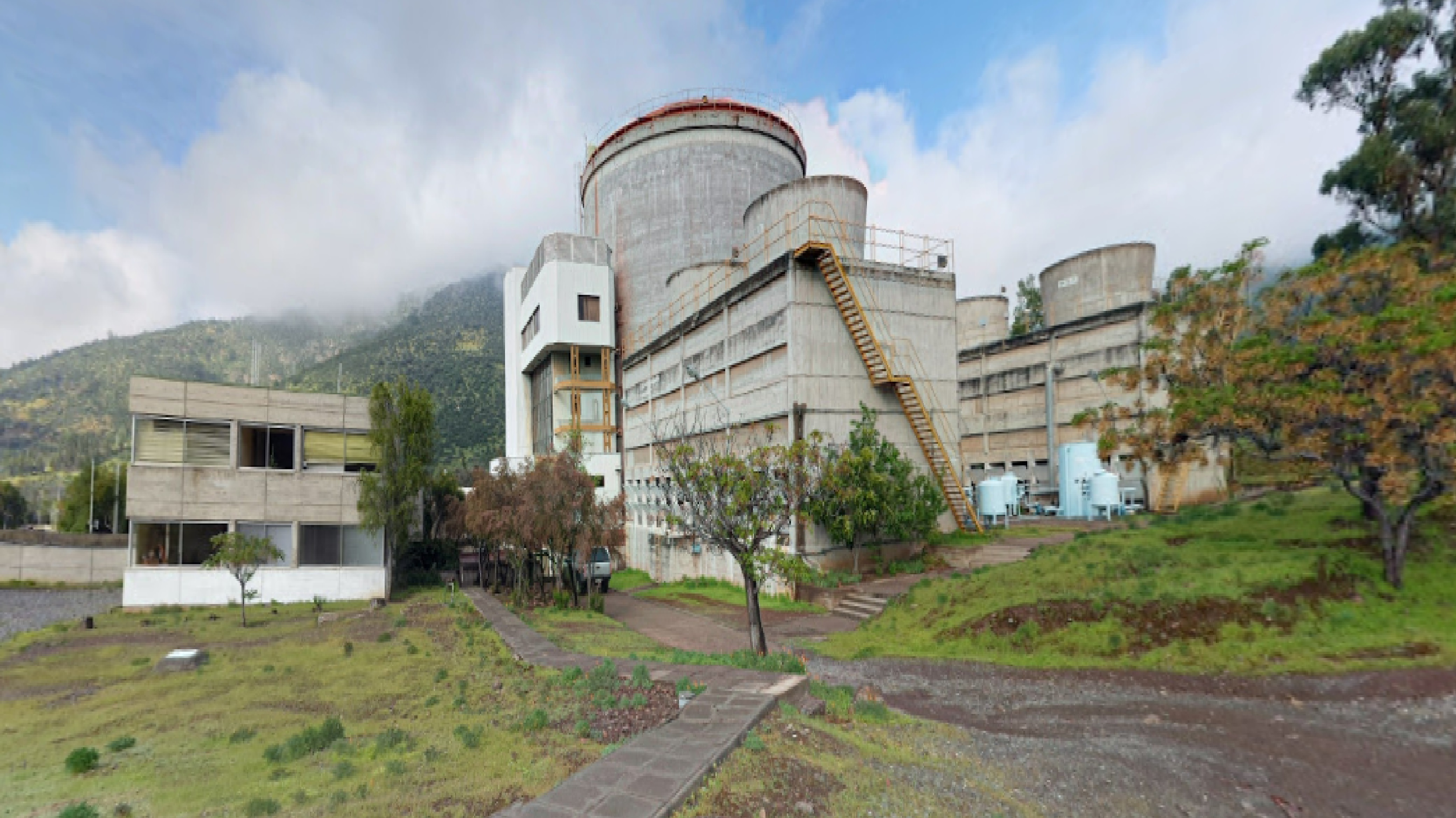
Lo Aguirre Nuclear Study Center

== Administration ==
As a commune, Pudahuel is a third-level administrative division of Chile administered by a municipal council, headed by an alcalde (Mayor) who is directly elected every four years.

The 2021–2024 mayor is Ítalo Bravo Lizana (Equality Party). The communal council has the following members:

- Cinthya Muñoz Escanilla (PI)
- Sandy Muñoz Poblete (PI)
- Javiera Soto Fuentes (Ind./PH)
- Esteban Sepúlveda Reyes (PCCh)
- Carolina Seguel Hidalgo (PCCh)
- José Escobar Rodríguez (RD)
- Aldea Magaña Leiva (PS)
- Cristian Véliz Solís (Ind./PPD)
- Patricio Cisternas Monreal (PDC)
- Gisela Vila Ruz (UDI)

Within the electoral divisions of Chile, Pudahuel is part of electoral district No. 8 together with the commune of Colina, Lampa, Pudahuel, Maipú, Til Til, Cerrillos and Estación Central. On the other hand, the commune belongs to the VII Senatorial District that represents the entire Metropolitan Region of Santiago.

== Demographics ==
As of the 2024 census, the population is 227,820, of which 48.1% are males, and 51.9% are females. People aged under 15 years old make up 17.8% of the population, and people aged 65 years old and over make up 12.2%. 97.1% of the population is urban and 2.9% is rural.

Historical population
| Year | Pop. | ±% p.a. |
|---|---|---|
| 1970 | 50,959 | — |
| 1982 | 97,578 | +5.56% |
| 1992 | 137,940 | +3.52% |
| 2002 | 195,653 | +3.56% |
| 2017 | 230,293 | +1.09% |
| 2024 | 227,820 | −0.15% |
Source: INE, Memoria Chilena

- Average annual household income: US$19,766 (PPP, 2006)
- Population below poverty line: 7.1% (2006)
- Regional quality of life index: 71.61, mid-low, 39 out of 52 (2005)
- Human Development Index: 0.735, 59 out of 341 (2003)

=== Ethnic minorities ===
As of the 2024 census, Indigenous peoples make up 9.5% of the population, and Afro-Chileans make up 0.9%.

=== Religion ===
As of the 2024 census, 68.4% of the population over 15 years old are Christians (48.9% Catholics, 16.4% Evangelicals or Protestants, and 3.0% other branches), 0.2% are Jews, 0.1% are Muslims, 0.1% are Buddhists, 0.02% are Hinduists, 0.8% are adrehents of other religions, and 30.5% are irreligious.

=== Immigration ===
As of the 2024 census, immigrants make up 7.2% of the population – 6.5% are from South America, 0.6% from North America, 0.05% from Europe, 0.1% from Asia, 0.004% from Africa, and 0.001% from Oceania.

== See also ==
- Laguna Carén
