= Colina, Chile =

Colina
- City and Commune
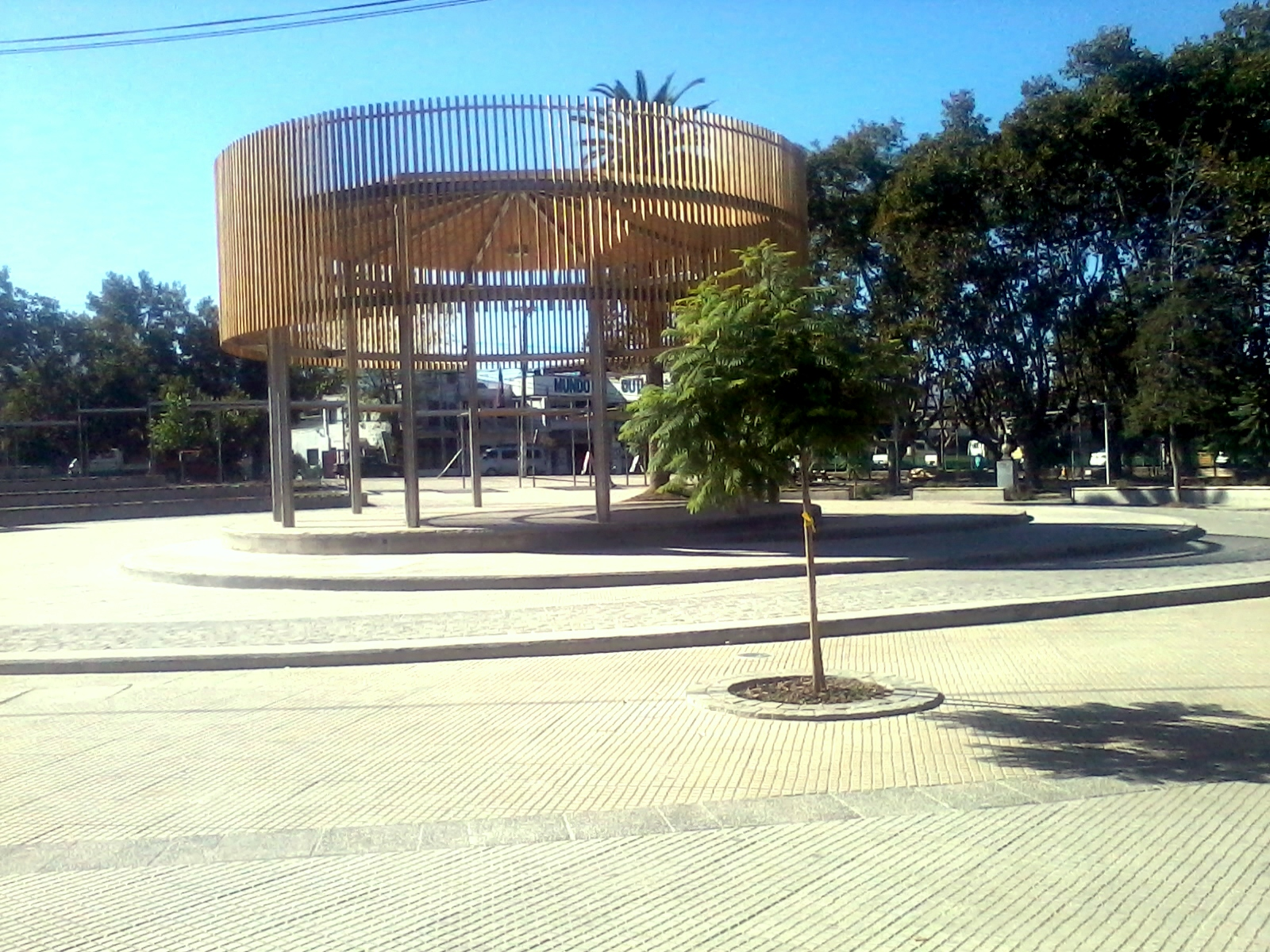
- Plaza de Colina

- Coat of arms Location in Chile
- Coordinates: 33°12′6″S 70°40′13″W
- Country: Chile
- Region: Santiago Metro.
- Province: Chacabuco
- Founded: 1891

Government
  - Type: Municipality
  - Mayor: Isabel Valenzuela (UDI)

Area
  - Total: 971.2 km^{2} (375.0 sq mi)
- Elevation: 620 m (2,030 ft)

Population (2002 Census)
  - Total: 77,815
  - Density: 80.12/km^{2} (207.5/sq mi)
  - Urban: 62,811
  - Rural: 15,004

Sex
  - Men: 41,004
  - Women: 36,811
- Time zone: UTC-4 (CLT)
  - Summer (DST): UTC-3 (CLST)
- Area code: 56 +
- Website: Municipality of Colina

Colina is a Chilean city and commune, capital of the Chacabuco Province, in the northern part of the Santiago Metropolitan Region, approximately 30 kilometers north of Santiago Centro.

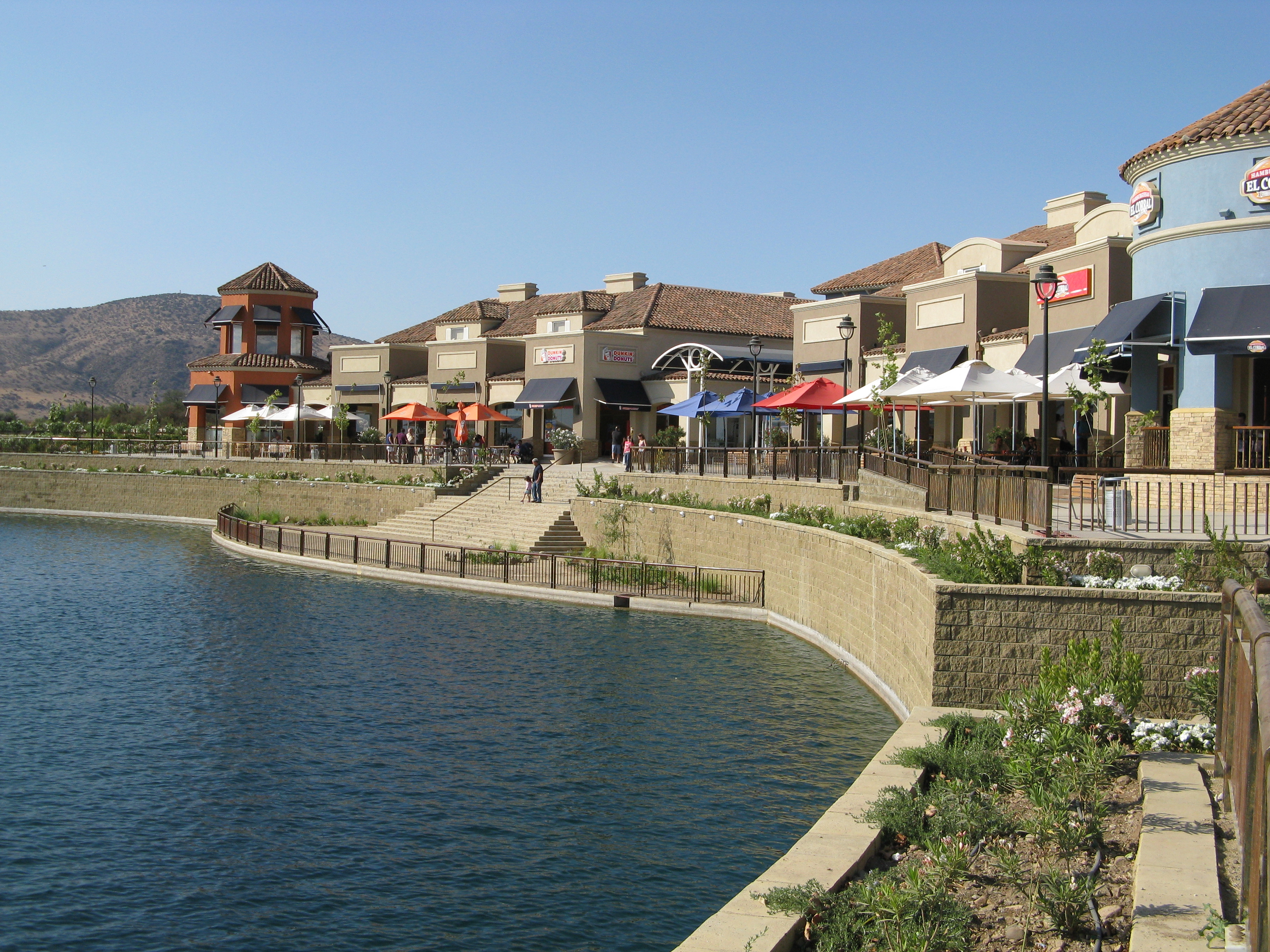
Artificial lagoon in Chicureo, Colina

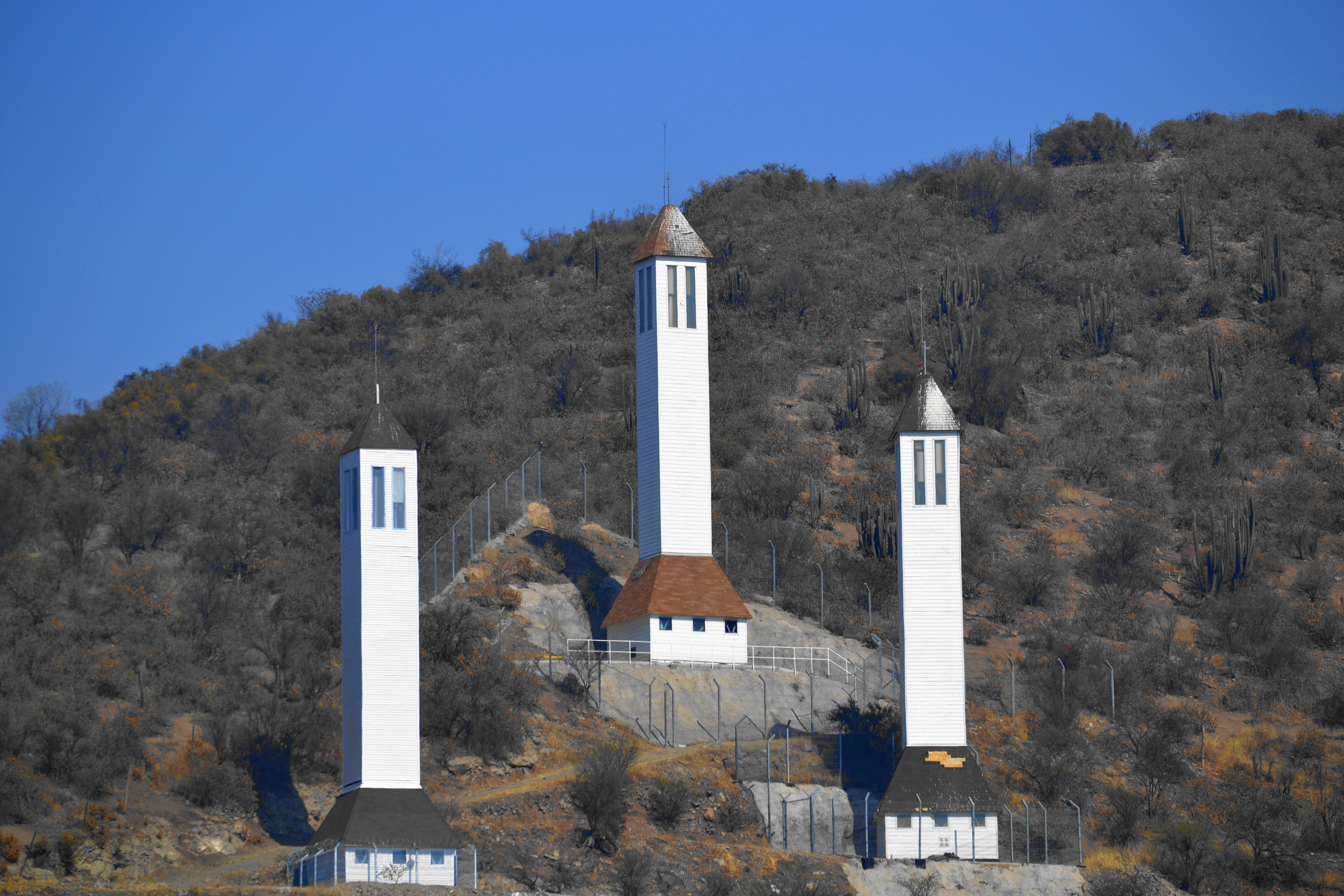
lighthouses

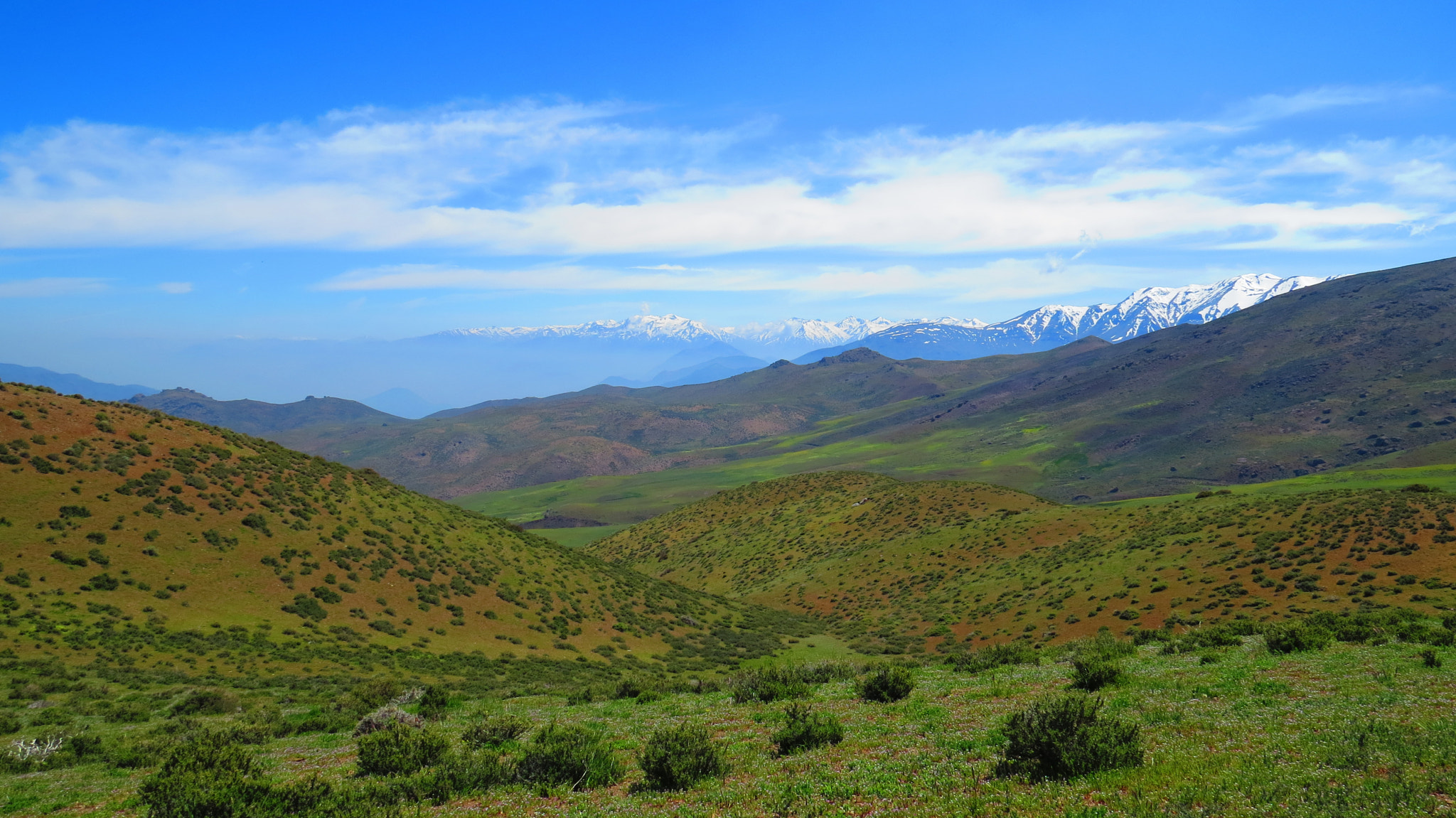
Pre andean landscape

== Demographics ==
According to the 2002 census of the National Statistics Institute, Colina spans an area of 52,769 km^{2} (20,374 sq mi) and has 77,815 inhabitants (41,004 men and 36,811 women). Of these, 62,811 (80.7%) lived in urban areas and 15,004 (19.3%) in rural areas. The population grew by 47.5% (25,046 persons) between the 1992 and 2002 censuses. Average household income: US$19,783 (PPP, 2006).

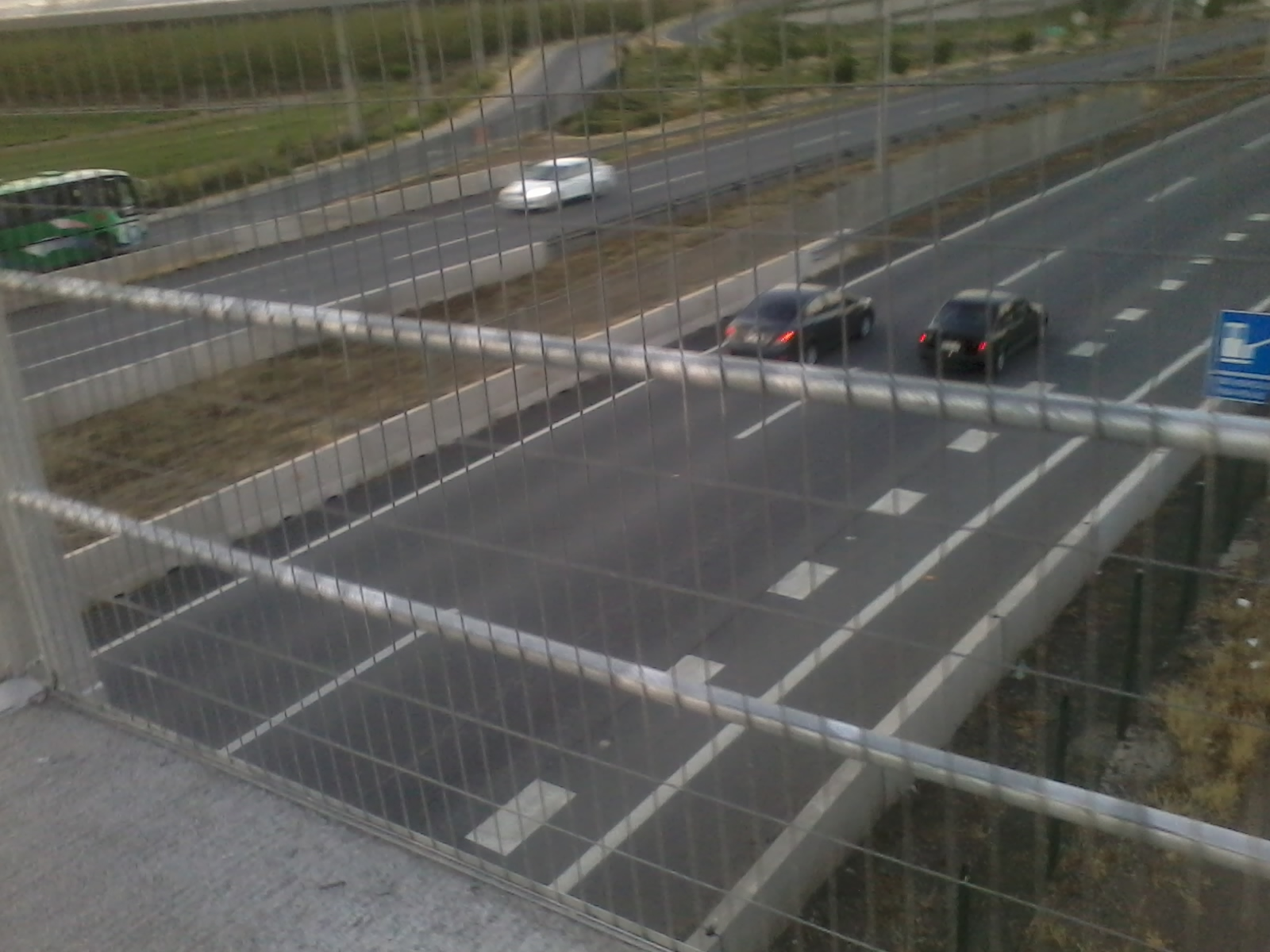
The highway and the main road to reach the area

== Administration ==
As a commune, Colina is a third-level administrative division of Chile administered by a municipal council, headed by a mayor who is directly elected every four years. Since 2021, the mayor has been Isabel Valenzuela Ahumada (UDI). The 2024-2028 municipal council has the following members:

- Carlos Andrews Cruz (REP)
- Federico Koch Valenzuela (FA)
- Gonzalo Torres Ferrari (RN)
- Rafael Goni del Río (RN)
- Orlando Melo Inostroza (PS)
- Angélica Antiman Palman (UDI)
- Lorena Rojas Mendoza (RN)
- Soledad Vial Cummins (REP)

The regional intendant, appointed by the president, is Fernando Echeverría. Belonging to Province of Chacabuco, whose actual governor is Mrs. Angélica Antimán.

Within the electoral divisions of Chile, Colina is represented in the Chamber of Deputies by Mr. Patricio Melero (UDI) and Mr. Gabriel Silber (PDC) as part of the 16th electoral district (together with Lampa, Tiltil, Quilicura and Pudahuel). The commune is represented in the Senate by Guido Girardi Lavín (PPD) and Jovino Novoa Vásquez (UDI) as part of the 7th senatorial constituency (Santiago-West).

== Education ==
The Chamisero campus of the Lycée Antoine-de-Saint-Exupéry de Santiago is in Colina. The campus officially opened on May 21, 2013 although the maternelle (kindergarten) opened in February of that year.

See also: This
