= Estación Central =

- City and Commune
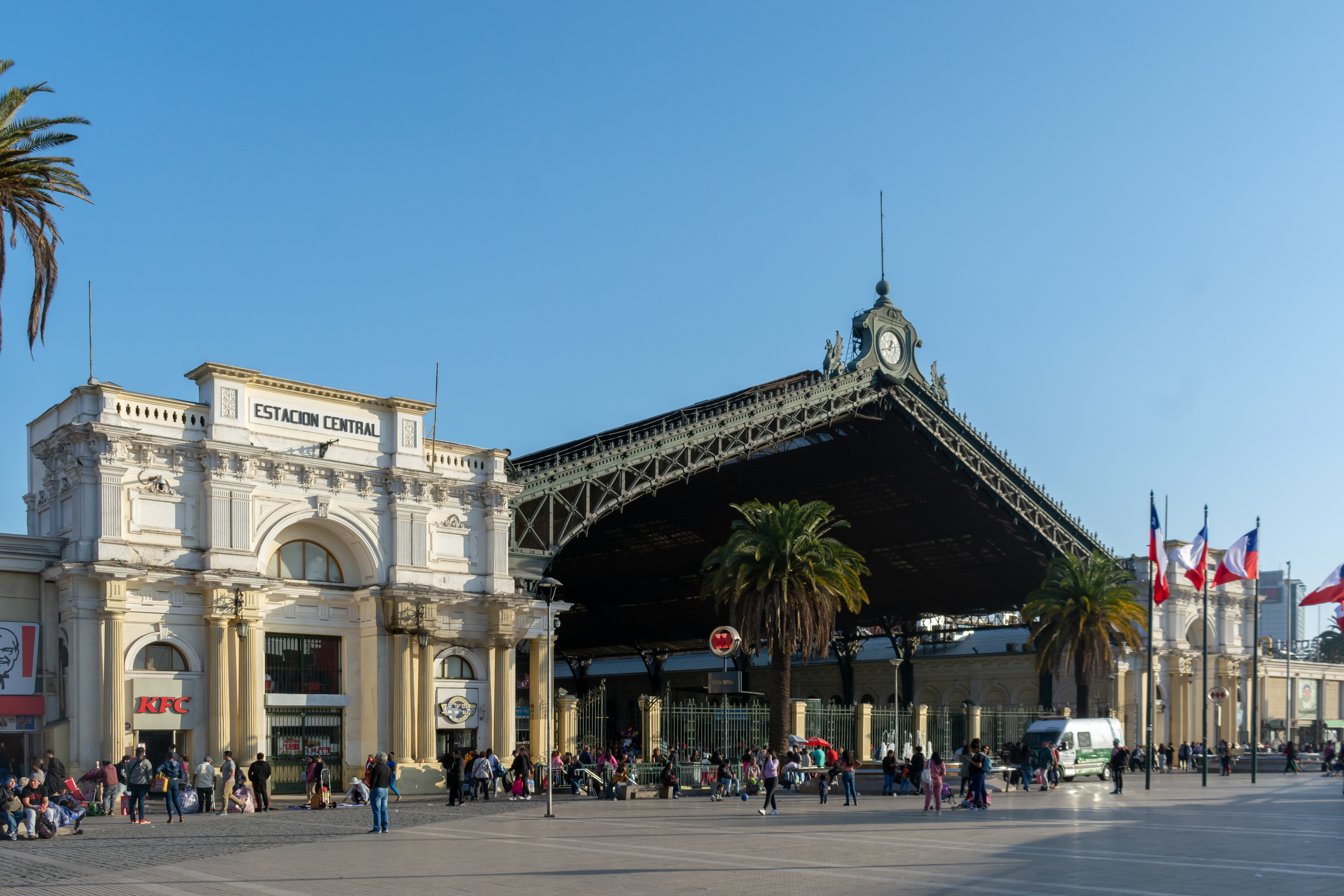
- Estación Central railway station

- Coat of arms Estación Central within Greater Santiago Location in Chile
- Coordinates (city): 33°28′S 70°42′W
- Country: Chile
- Region: Santiago
- Province: Santiago

Government
  - Type: Municipality
  - Alcalde: Felipe Muñoz Vallejos (Ind/FA)

Area
  - Total: 14.1 km^{2} (5.4 sq mi)

Population (2024)
  - Total: 181,049
  - Rank: 25th in Chile
  - Density: 12,800/km^{2} (33,300/sq mi)
  - Urban: 181,049
  - Rural: 0
- Time zone: UTC-4 (CLT)
  - Summer (DST): UTC-3 (CLST)
- Area code: 56 +
- Website: Municipality of Estación Central

Estación Central ((Spanish pronunciation: [estaˈsjon senˈtɾal]), Spanish for "central station") is a commune of Chile located in Santiago Province, Santiago Metropolitan Region. It is named after the Estación Central railway station, which is located within the commune. It has 181,049 inhabitants.

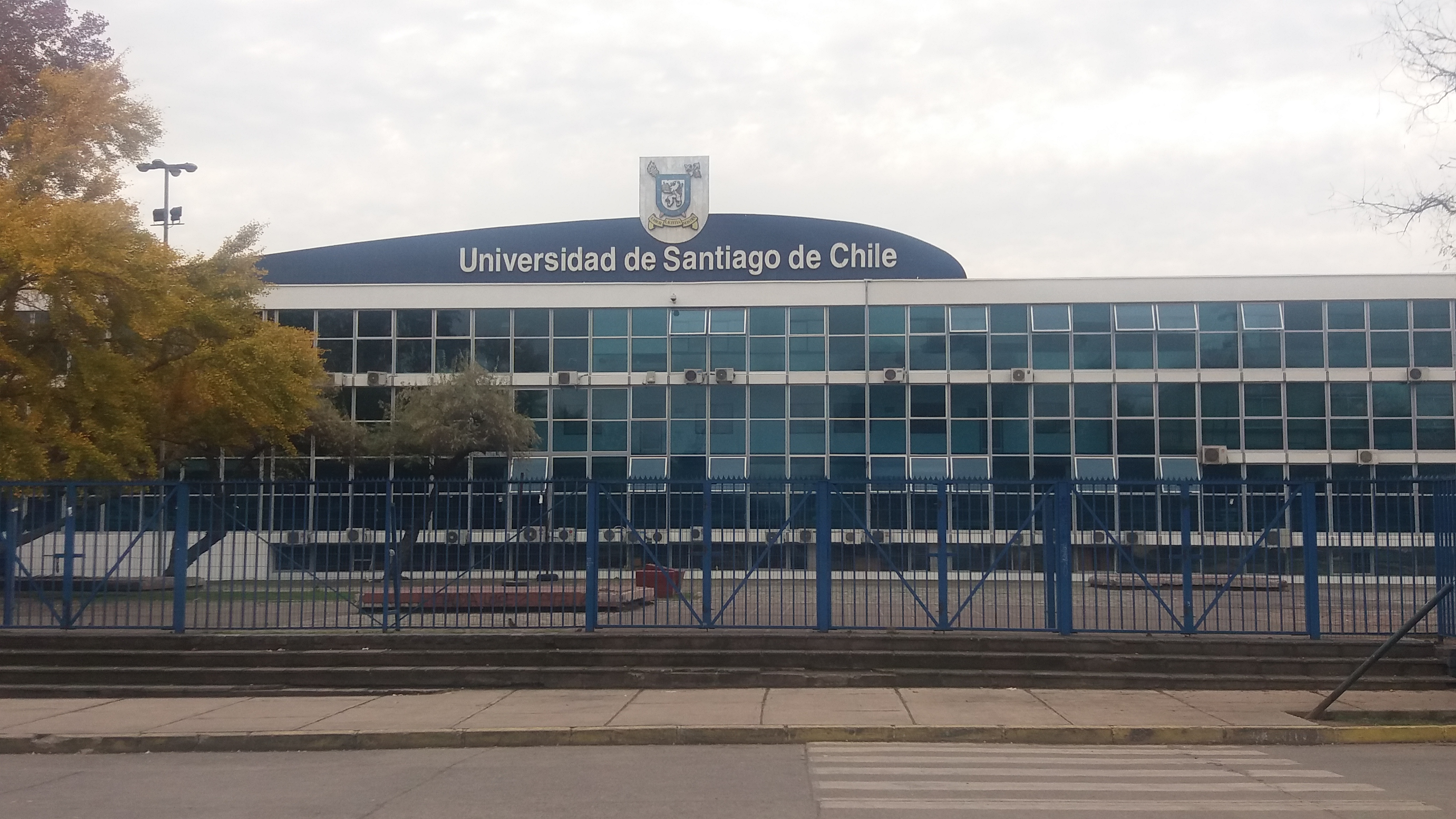
Universidad de Santiago de Chile

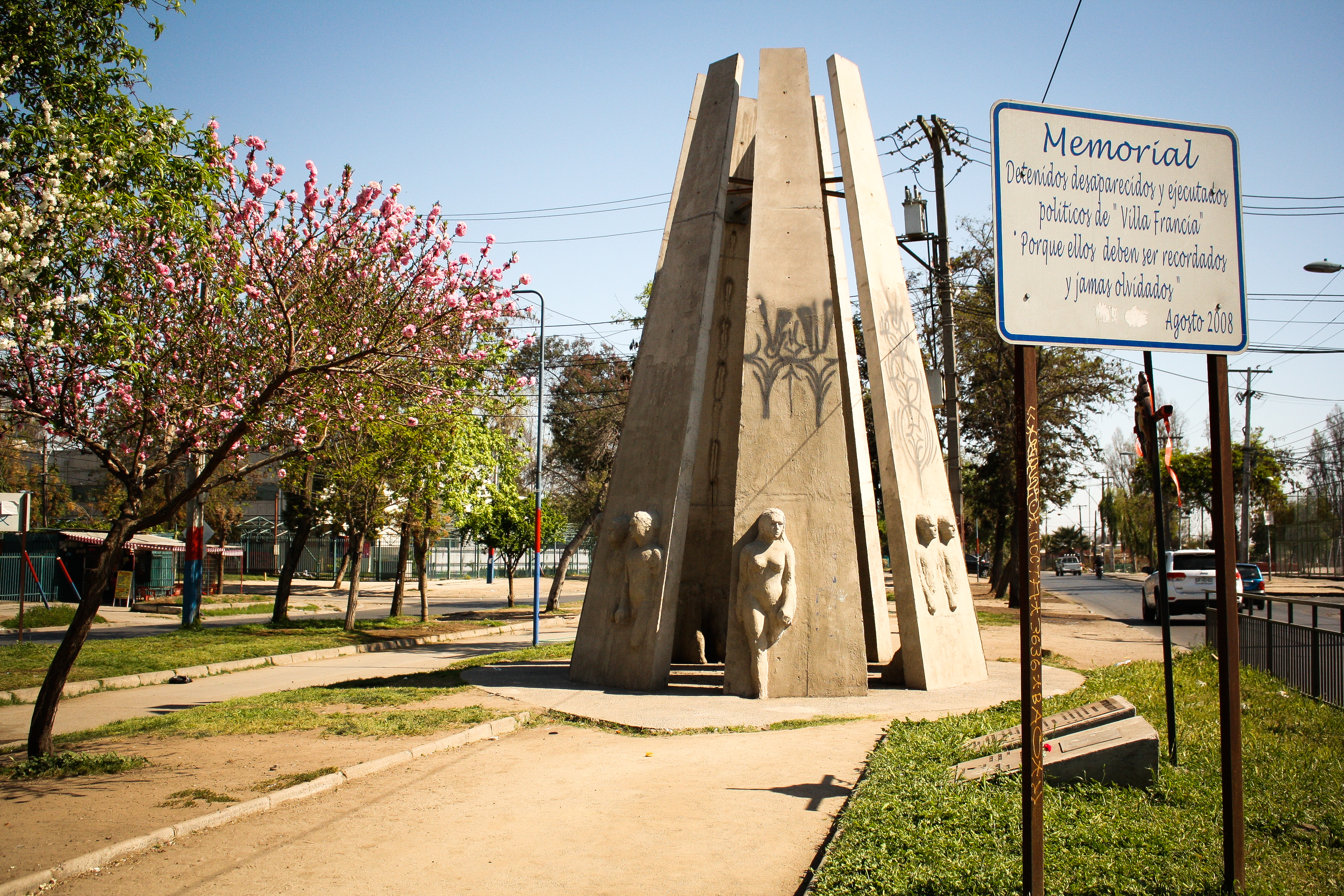
Human Rights Memorial in Villa Francia

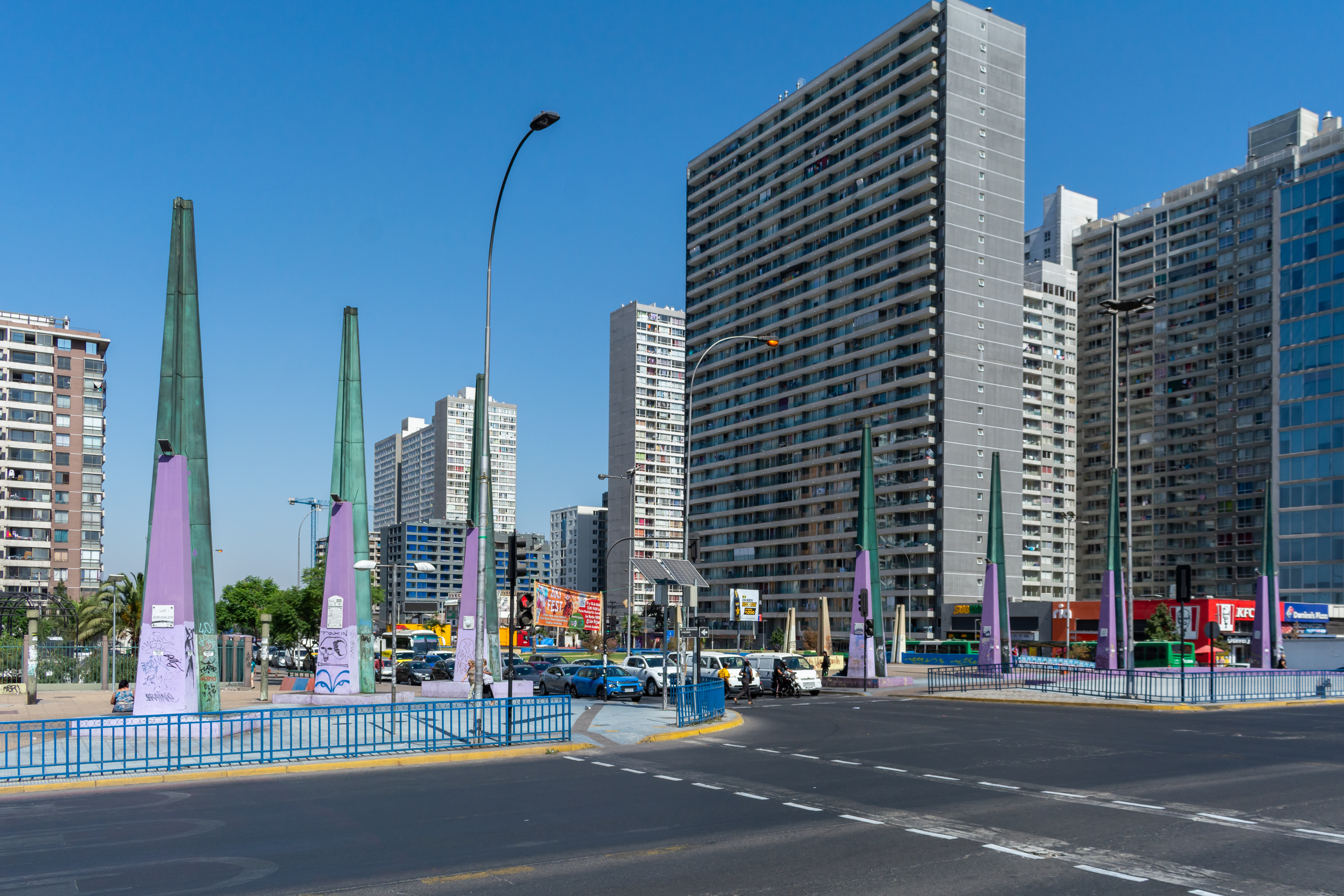
Palestine boulevard

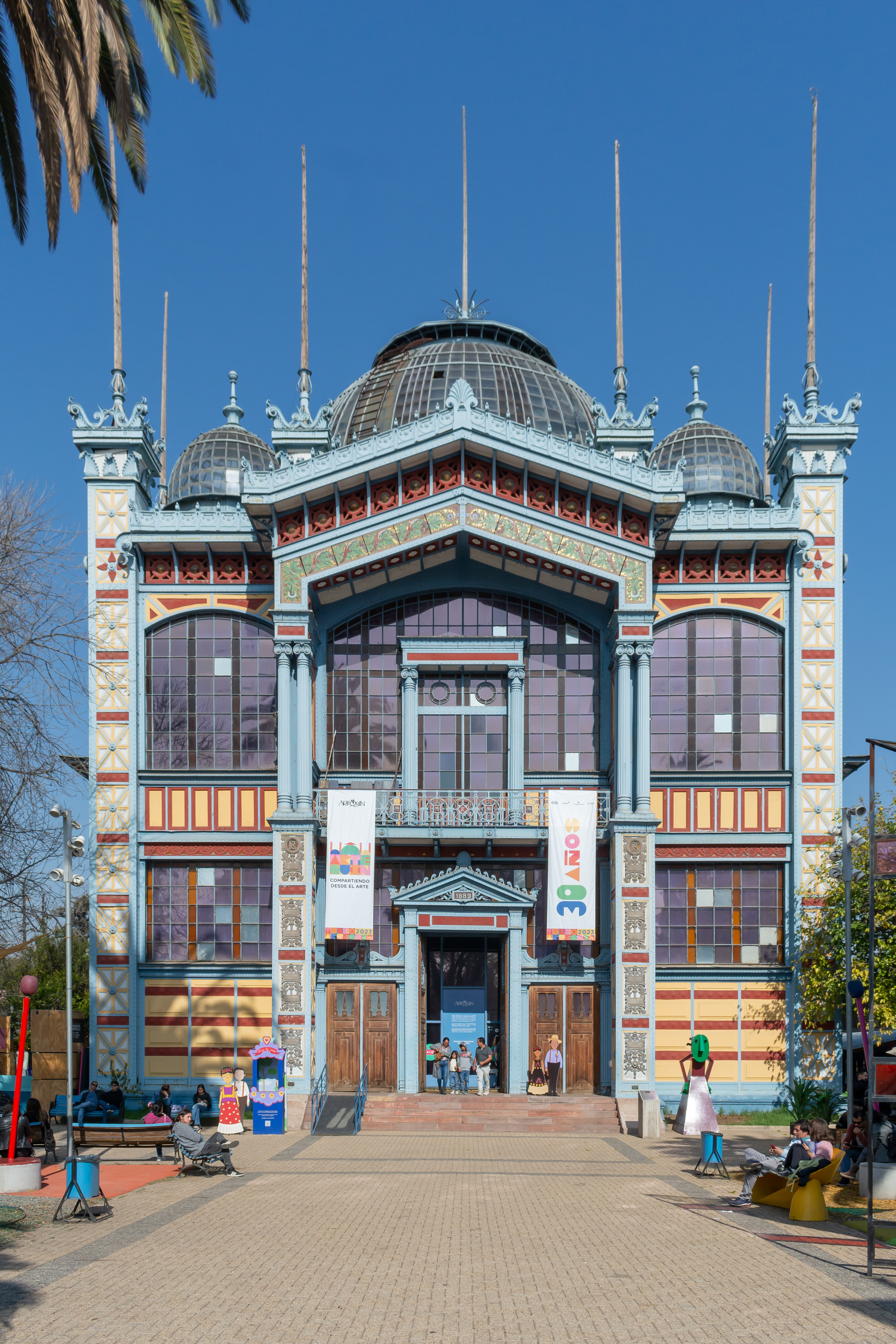
Pabellón París

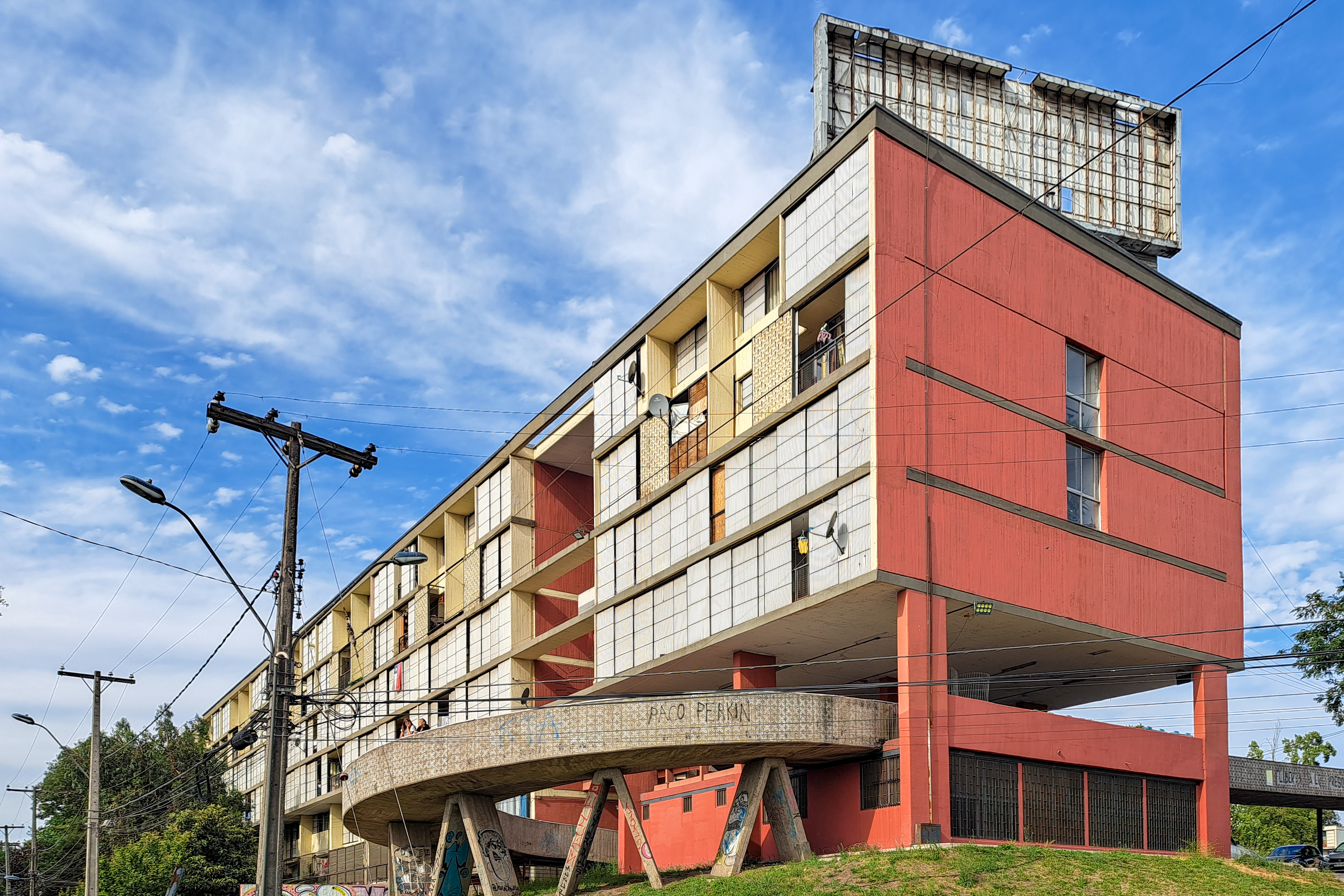
Villa Portales nighborhood

== Demographics ==
As of the 2024 census, the commune has a population of 181,049, of which 49.0% are male and 51.0% are female. People under 15 years old make up 17.2% of the population, and people over 65 years old make up 10.7%. 100% of the population is urban.

Historical population
Year	Pop.	±% p.a.
1970	131,157	—
1982	147,918	+1.01%
1992	140,896	−0.49%
2002	130,394	−0.77%
2017	147,041	+0.80%
2024	181,049	+3.02%
Source: INE, Memoria Chilena

- Average annual household income: $21,601 (PPP, 2006)
- Population below poverty line: 7.3% (2006)
- Regional quality of life index: 76.38, mid-high, 22 out of 52 (2005)
- Human Development Index: 0.735, 60 out of 341 (2003)

=== Immigration ===
As of the 2024 census, immigrants make up 38.3% of the population - 35.7% are from South America, 2.3% from North America, 0.1% from Europe, 0.1% from Asia, 0.01% from Africa, and 0.01% from Oceania.

== Administration ==
As a commune, Cerro Navia is a third-level administrative division of Chile administered by a municipal council, headed by an alcalde who is directly elected every four years. The 2024-2028 alcalde is Felipe Muñoz Vallejos (Ind/FA). The communal council has the following members:

- Francisco Rodríguez Garrido (REP)
- Eduardo Rojas Peña (REP)
- Alejandra Sepúlveda Torres (RN)
- Evelyn Pino Retamal (UDI)
- Angélica Cid Venegas (PS)
- María Pacheco Romero (PCCh)
- Juan Araos Vásquez (FA)
- Victoria Herrera Pacheco (Ind/FA)

Within the electoral divisions of Chile, Estación Central is represented in the Chamber of Deputies by Pepe Auth (PPD) and Mónica Zalaquett (UDI) as part of the 20th electoral district, which consists entirely of the Santiago commune. The commune is represented in the Senate by Guido Girardi Lavín (PPD) and Jovino Novoa Vásquez (UDI) as part of the 7th senatorial constituency (Santiago-West).
