= 56th National Congress of Chile =

Chilean legislative period 2022–2026

LVI period of the Chilean Congress
| ← | 55th | 57th | → |

Overview
- Term: March 11, 2022 – March 10, 2026

Senate
- Members: 50
- Senate President: Juan Antonio Coloma Correa (UDI)
- Senate Vice President: Francisco Huenchumilla (DC)
- Senate General Secretary: Raúl Guzmán Uribe (PR

Chamber of Deputies
- Members: 155
- President of the Chamber: Vlado Mirosevic (PL)
- 1st Vice President: Carlos Bianchi Chelech (Ind.-PPD)
- 2nd Vice President: Catalina Pérez Salinas (RD)
- General Secretary of the Chamber: Miguel Landeros Perkic

The LVI legislative period of the Chilean Congress is sitting from 11 March 2022 to 10 March 2026. It is composed of the senators and the deputies who are members of their respective chambers.

It was elected at the 2021 Chilean general election. In that electoral process, the Chamber of Deputies was entirely renewed, with 155 representatives elected; as for the Senate, 27 new representatives were elected out of 50 seats. The Senate of the Republic was formed with 23 senators elected in 2017 who were already serving from the previous legislative period.

== Composition ==
=== Senate ===
The Senate of the Republic included 23 senators elected in 2017 who were already serving from the previous legislative period.

The composition of the Senate in the 56th legislative period is as follows:

==== Number of senators by political affiliation ====
| Government | Senators | Coalition | Senators |
|---|---|---|---|
| Republican Party | 1 | Christian Social Front | 1 |
| Independent Democratic Union | 9 | Chile Vamos | 24 |
| National Renewal | 12 | Chile Vamos | 24 |
| Political Evolution | 3 | Chile Vamos | 24 |
| Christian Democratic Party | 5 | New Social Pact | 18 |
| Party for Democracy | 6 | New Social Pact | 18 |
| Socialist Party of Chile | 7 | New Social Pact | 18 |
| Democratic Revolution | 1 | Apruebo Dignidad | 5 |
| Social Green Regionalist Federation | 2 | Apruebo Dignidad | 5 |
| Communist Party of Chile | 2 | Apruebo Dignidad | 5 |
| Independents out of pact | 2 | Independents out of pact | 2 |

==== Members ====
| Region | Const. | Official portrait | Senator | Party | Previous public service | Education | Start | End |
|---|---|---|---|---|---|---|---|---|
| Arica and Parinacota | I | | José Miguel Insulza Salinas | PS | Secretary General of the Organization of American States | University of Chile | 11 March 2018 | 11 March 2026 |
| Arica and Parinacota | I | | José Durana Semir | UDI | Intendant of the Arica and Parinacota Region during the Sebastián Piñera government | University of Tarapacá | 11 March 2018 | 11 March 2026 |
| Tarapacá | II | | Jorge Soria | PPD | Mayor of Iquique | Liceo de Hombres de Iquique | 11 March 2018 | 11 March 2026 |
| Tarapacá | II | | Luz Ebensperger Orrego | UDI | Intendant of the Tarapacá Region during the Sebastián Piñera government | Pontifical Catholic University of Chile | 11 March 2018 | 11 March 2026 |
| Antofagasta | III | | Pedro Araya Guerrero | Ind- PPD | Deputy for the former District 4 of the Antofagasta Region | University of Antofagasta | 11 March 2022 | 11 March 2030 |
| Antofagasta | III | | Esteban Velásquez Núñez | FREVS | Deputy for District 3 of the Antofagasta Region | University of Tarapacá | 11 March 2022 | 11 March 2030 |
| Antofagasta | III | | Paulina Núñez Urrutia | RN | Deputy for District 3 of the Antofagasta Region | Catholic University of the North | 11 March 2022 | 11 March 2030 |
| Atacama | IV | | Yasna Provoste Campillay | PDC | Deputy for the former District 6 of the Atacama Region | University of Playa Ancha | 11 March 2018 | 11 March 2026 |
| Atacama | IV | | Rafael Prohens Espinosa | RN | Intendant of the Atacama Region during the Sebastián Piñera government | Colegio Excelsior, Santiago | 11 March 2018 | 11 March 2026 |
| Coquimbo | V | | Daniel Núñez Arancibia | PCCh | Deputy for District 5 of the Coquimbo Region | University of Chile | 11 March 2022 | 11 March 2030 |
| Coquimbo | V | | Matías Walker Prieto | DEM (Note: Matías Walker and Ximena Rincón were elected as members of the Christian Democratic Party. They resigned from the party in late October 2022 to form Democrats.) | Deputy for District 5 of the Coquimbo Region | Diego Portales University; University of Development | 11 March 2022 | 11 March 2030 |
| Coquimbo | V | | Sergio Gahona Salazar | UDI | Deputy for District 5 of the Coquimbo Region | Diego Portales University; Catholic University of the North | 11 March 2022 | 11 March 2030 |
| Valparaíso | VI | | Francisco Chahuán Chahuán | RN | Deputy for the former District 14 of the Valparaíso Region | University of Valparaíso | 11 March 2010 | 11 March 2026 |
| Valparaíso | VI | | Kenneth Pugh Olavarría | Ind- RN | Director General of Personnel of the Navy | Arturo Prat Naval School | 11 March 2018 | 11 March 2026 |
| Valparaíso | VI | | Ricardo Lagos Weber | PPD | minister secretary-general of government during the Michelle Bachelet government | University of Chile; University of Sussex | 11 March 2010 | 11 March 2026 |
| Valparaíso | VI | | Tomás de Rementería Venegas | PS | Deputy for District 7 of the Valparaíso Region | Gabriela Mistral University | 23 April 2025 | 11 March 2026 |
| Valparaíso | VI | | Juan Ignacio Latorre Riveros | FA | No previous public office. | Central University of Chile; University of Barcelona | 11 March 2018 | 11 March 2026 |
| Metropolitan Region of Santiago | VII | | Manuel José Ossandón Irarrázabal | RN | Mayor of Puente Alto | Inacap | 11 March 2022 | 11 March 2030 |
| Metropolitan Region of Santiago | VII | | Luciano Cruz-Coke Carvallo | EVOP | Deputy for District 10 of the Metropolitan Region | Lee Strasberg Theatre and Film Institute; Academia de Humanismo Cristiano University | 11 March 2022 | 11 March 2030 |
| Metropolitan Region of Santiago | VII | | Claudia Pascual Grau | PCCh | Minister of Women and Gender Equity during the Michelle Bachelet government | University of Chile | 11 March 2022 | 11 March 2030 |
| Metropolitan Region of Santiago | VII | | Fabiola Campillai Rojas | Ind | No previous public office. | Liceo Fidel Pinochet Le-brun, San Bernardo and Liceo Manuel Barros Borgoño, Santiago | 11 March 2022 | 11 March 2030 |
| Metropolitan Region of Santiago | VII | | Rojo Edwards Silva | PSC | Deputy for the former District 51 of the Araucanía Region | Pontifical Catholic University of Chile; John F. Kennedy School of Government | 11 March 2022 | 11 March 2030 |
| O'Higgins | VIII | | Alejandra Sepúlveda Orbenes | Ind-FREVS (Note: Elected under the quota of the Green Social Regionalist Federation, she resigned from the party on 24 March 2023.) | Deputy for District 16 of the O'Higgins Region | Austral University of Chile | 11 March 2022 | 11 March 2030 |
| O'Higgins | VIII | | Javier Macaya Danus | UDI | Deputy for District 15 of the O'Higgins Region | Pontifical Catholic University of Chile; University of Valparaíso; Adolfo Ibáñez University | 11 March 2022 | 11 March 2030 |
| O'Higgins | VIII | | Juan Luis Castro González | PS | Deputy for District 15 of the O'Higgins Region | University of Chile | 11 March 2022 | 11 March 2030 |
| Maule | IX | | Juan Castro Prieto | PSC | Mayor of Talca | Liceo Industrial A-10, Talca | 11 March 2018 | 11 March 2026 |
| Maule | IX | | Rodrigo Galilea Vial | RN | Intendant of the Maule Region during the Sebastián Piñera government | Pontifical Catholic University of Chile | 11 March 2018 | 11 March 2026 |
| Maule | IX | | Juan Antonio Coloma Correa | UDI | Deputy for the former District 31 of the Metropolitan Region | Pontifical Catholic University of Chile | 11 March 2002 | 11 March 2026 |
| Maule | IX | | Ximena Rincón González | DEM | Minister of Labor and Social Security during the Michelle Bachelet government | University of Chile | 11 March 2018 | 11 March 2026 |
| Maule | IX | | Paulina Vodanovic Rojas | PS | Undersecretary for the Armed Forces during the Michelle Bachelet government | University of Chile | 25 April 2023 | 11 March 2026 |
| Biobío | X | | Sebastián Keitel Bianchi | EVOP (Note: He was elected as a member of Evópoli, but resigned from the party on 14 November 2023. He rejoined the party in late 2025.) | Deputy for District 9 of the Metropolitan Region | Catholic University Silva Henríquez | 11 March 2022 | 11 March 2030 |
| Biobío | X | | Enrique van Rysselberghe Herrera | UDI | Deputy for District 20 of the Biobío Region | University of Development | 11 March 2022 | 11 March 2030 |
| Biobío | X | | Gastón Saavedra Chandía | PS | Deputy for District 20 of the Biobío Region | Federico Santa María Technical University | 11 March 2022 | 11 March 2030 |
| Ñuble | XVI | | Loreto Carvajal Ambiado | PPD | Deputy for District 19 of the Ñuble Region | Catholic University of the Most Holy Conception | 3 March 2021 | 11 March 2030 |
| Ñuble | XVI | | Gustavo Sanhueza Dueñas | UDI | Deputy for District 19 of the Ñuble Region | University of Bío-Bío | 11 March 2022 | 11 March 2030 |
| Araucanía | XI | | Felipe Kast Sommerhoff | EVOP | Deputy for the former District 22 of the Metropolitan Region | Pontifical Catholic University of Chile; Harvard University | 11 March 2018 | 11 March 2026 |
| Araucanía | XI | | Francisco Huenchumilla Jaramillo | PDC | Intendant of the Araucanía Region during the Michelle Bachelet government | University of Chile | 11 March 2018 | 11 March 2026 |
| Araucanía | XI | | Jaime Quintana Leal | PPD | Deputy for the former District 49 of the Araucanía Region | Pontifical Catholic University of Chile; University of La Frontera | 11 March 2010 | 11 March 2026 |
| Araucanía | XI | | José García Ruminot | RN | Deputy for the former District 50 of the Araucanía Region | University of La Frontera | 11 March 2002 | 11 March 2026 |
| Araucanía | XI | | Carmen Gloria Aravena Acuña | Ind- RN | Municipal administrator of Traiguén | University of La Frontera | 11 March 2018 | 11 March 2026 |
| Los Ríos | XII | | Alfonso de Urresti Longton | PS | Deputy for the former District 53 of the Los Ríos Region | University of Chile | 11 March 2022 | 11 March 2030 |
| Los Ríos | XII | | María José Gatica Bertín | RN | Governor of Valdivia Province during the Sebastián Piñera government | Austral University of Chile | 11 March 2022 | 11 March 2030 |
| Los Ríos | XII | | Iván Flores García | PDC | Deputy for District 24 of the Los Ríos Region | Austral University of Chile | 11 March 2022 | 11 March 2030 |
| Los Lagos | XIII | | Iván Moreira Barros | UDI | Deputy for the former District 27 of the Metropolitan Region | Liceo Luis Alberto Barrera, Punta Arenas | 11 March 2022 | 11 March 2030 |
| Los Lagos | XIII | | Fidel Espinoza Sandoval | PS | Deputy for District 25 of the Los Lagos Region | University of Chile | 11 March 2022 | 11 March 2030 |
| Los Lagos | XIII | | Carlos Kuschel Silva | RN | Deputy for District 26 of the Los Lagos Region | Austral University of Chile | 11 March 2022 | 11 March 2030 |
| Aysén | XIV | | David Sandoval Plaza | UDI | Deputy for the former District 59 of the Aysén Region | University of Chile | 11 March 2018 | 11 March 2026 |
| Aysén | XIV | | Ximena Órdenes Neira | Ind- PPD | Intendant of the Aysén Region during the Michelle Bachelet government | Andrés Bello University | 11 March 2018 | 11 March 2026 |
| Magallanes | XV | | Karim Bianchi Retamales | Ind | Deputy for District 28 of the Magallanes Region | UNIACC University; University of Magallanes | 11 March 2022 | 11 March 2030 |
| Magallanes | XV | | Alejandro Kusanovic Glusevic | Ind- RN | President of the Regional Council for the Magallanes and Chilean Antarctica Region between 2019-2021 | State Technical University | 11 March 2022 | 11 March 2030 |

==== Presidents of the Senate ====
| Start | End | President | Party | |
|---|---|---|---|---|
| 11 March 2022 | 15 March 2023 | Álvaro Elizalde Soto | 25px | PS |
| 15 March 2023 | 19 March 2024 | Juan Antonio Coloma Correa | 25px | UDI |
| 19 March 2024 | 26 March 2025 | José García Ruminot | 25px | RN |
| 26 March 2025 | Incumbent | Manuel José Ossandón Irarrázabal | 25px | RN |

==== Vice Presidents of the Senate ====
| Period | Name | Party |
|---|---|---|
| 2022–2023 | Luz Ebensperger Orrego | UDI |
| 2023–2024 | Francisco Huenchumilla Jaramillo | PDC |
| 2024–2025 | Matías Walker Prieto | DEM |
| 2025–present | Ricardo Lagos Weber | PPD |

Political affiliation changes
| Name | From | To | Constituency | |
|---|---|---|---|---|
| Carmen Gloria Aravena | Ind-RN | PRCh | 11 | She began the parliamentary term in the National Renewal committee. In January 2023, she joined the Republican Party. |
| Carmen Gloria Aravena | PRCh | Ind-RN | 11 | She resigned from the Republican Party in April 2025 after supporting the proposal of the Presidential Commission for Peace and Understanding (Comisión Presidencial para la Paz y el Entendimiento). She subsequently joined the National Renewal committee. |
| Ximena Rincón | PDC | DEM | 9 | They resigned from the Christian Democratic Party in October 2022, after their support for, and the subsequent victory of, the "Reject" option in the 2022 constitutional referendum, a position different from that expressed by the party. After this, they created a new party called Democrats. |
| Matías Walker | PDC | DEM | 5 | They resigned from the Christian Democratic Party in October 2022, after their support for, and the subsequent victory of, the "Reject" option in the 2022 constitutional referendum, a position different from that expressed by the party. After this, they created a new party called Democrats. |
| Alejandra Sepúlveda | FRVS | Ind-FRVS | 8 | Elected as a senator for the Green Social Regionalist Federation, she resigned from the party in March 2023. |
| Rojo Edwards | PRCh | PSC | 7 | He was elected as a senator for the Republican Party. He resigned from the party after expressing support for the "Against" option in the 2023 constitutional referendum, a position different from that expressed by the party. He subsequently joined the Christian Social Party with a view to a presidential candidacy. |
| Rojo Edwards | PSC | Ind-PSC | 7 | He resigned from the Christian Social Party in April 2025 after the failure of his presidential pre-candidacy, although he remained in the party's committee in the Senate, while his new political party, Libertad, is legalized before the Electoral Service. |
| Sebastián Keitel | EVO | Ind-EVO | 10 | Elected as a senator for Evópoli, he resigned from the party in November 2023. |
| Juan Castro Prieto | Ind-RN | PSC | 9 | Elected as an independent senator with the support of National Renewal, he joined the Christian Social Party in May 2024. |
| Alejandro Kusanovic | RN | Ind-PSC | 15 | Elected as an independent senator with the support of National Renewal, he joined that party in December 2024. However, in August 2025 he announced his support for presidential candidate José Antonio Kast, which led to him being brought before his party's Supreme Tribunal and his subsequent resignation in October 2025. He joined the Christian Social Party committee as an independent in January 2026. |

=== Deputies ===
The composition of the Chamber of Deputies in the 56th legislative period is as follows:

==== Number of deputies by political affiliation ====
| Party | Deputies | Coalition | Deputies |
|---|---|---|---|
| Christian Conservative Party | 1 | Christian Social Front | 15 |
| Republican Party | 14 | Christian Social Front | 15 |
| Independent Democratic Union | 23 | Chile Vamos | 53 |
| National Renewal | 25 | Chile Vamos | 53 |
| Political Evolution | 4 | Chile Vamos | 53 |
| Democratic Independent Regionalist Party | 1 | Chile Vamos | 53 |
| Party of the People | 6 | Undefined | 6 |
| United Centre | 1 | United Independents | 1 |
| Citizens | 1 | New Social Pact | 37 |
| Christian Democratic Party | 8 | New Social Pact | 37 |
| Liberal Party of Chile | 4 | New Social Pact | 37 |
| Radical Party of Chile | 4 | New Social Pact | 37 |
| Party for Democracy | 7 | New Social Pact | 37 |
| Socialist Party of Chile | 13 | New Social Pact | 37 |
| Democratic Revolution | 8 | Apruebo Dignidad | 37 |
| Commons | 6 | Apruebo Dignidad | 37 |
| Social Convergence | 9 | Apruebo Dignidad | 37 |
| Social Green Regionalist Federation | 2 | Apruebo Dignidad | 37 |
| Communist Party of Chile | 12 | Apruebo Dignidad | 37 |
| Humanist Party of Chile | 3 | Dignity Now | 3 |
| Green Ecologist Party of Chile | 2 | Undefined | 2 |
| Independents out of pact | 1 | Independents out of pact | 1 |

==== Members ====
| Region | District | Deputy | Party |
|---|---|---|---|
| Arica y Parinacota (3) | 1 | Vlado Mirosevic Verdugo | PL |
| Arica y Parinacota (3) | 1 | Luis Malla Valenzuela | PL |
| Arica y Parinacota (3) | 1 | Enrique Lee Flores | PSC |
| Tarapacá (3) | 2 | Renzo Trisotti | UDI |
| Tarapacá (3) | 2 | Matías Ramírez Pascal | PCCh |
| Tarapacá (3) | 2 | Danisa Astudillo | PS |
| Antofagasta (5) | 3 | Catalina Pérez Salinas | RD |
| Antofagasta (5) | 3 | Sebastián Videla | Ind-PL |
| Antofagasta (5) | 3 | Jaime Araya Guerrero | Ind-PPD |
| Antofagasta (5) | 3 | Yovana Ahumada Palma | PSC |
| Antofagasta (5) | 3 | José Miguel Castro | RN |
| Atacama (5) | 4 | Daniella Cicardini | PS |
| Atacama (5) | 4 | Juan Santana | PS |
| Atacama (5) | 4 | Cristian Tapia Ramos | Ind-PPD |
| Atacama (5) | 4 | Jaime Mulet Martínez | FRVS |
| Atacama (5) | 4 | Sofía Cid | RN |
| Coquimbo (7) | 5 | Marco Sulantay | UDI |
| Coquimbo (7) | 5 | Juan Manuel Fuenzalida | UDI |
| Coquimbo (7) | 5 | Nathalie Castillo | PCCh |
| Coquimbo (7) | 5 | Carolina Tello | PCCh |
| Coquimbo (7) | 5 | Daniel Manouchehri Moghadam Kashan Lobos | PS |
| Coquimbo (7) | 5 | Ricardo Cifuentes | PDC |
| Coquimbo (7) | 5 | Víctor Pino | PDG |
| Valparaíso (16) | 6 | Diego Ibáñez Cotroneo | CS |
| Valparaíso (16) | 6 | Francisca Bello | CS |
| Valparaíso (16) | 6 | Carolina Marzán | PPD |
| Valparaíso (16) | 6 | Nelson Venegas | PS |
| Valparaíso (16) | 6 | Andrés Longton Herrera | RN |
| Valparaíso (16) | 6 | Camila Flores | RN |
| Valparaíso (16) | 6 | Chiara Barchiesi | PLR |
| Valparaíso (16) | 6 | Gaspar Rivas Sánchez | PDG |
| Valparaíso (16) | 7 | Tomás Lagomarsino | Ind-PR |
| Valparaíso (16) | 7 | Tomás de Rementería Venegas | Ind-PS |
| Valparaíso (16) | 7 | Camila Rojas | COM |
| Valparaíso (16) | 7 | Jorge Brito Hasbún | RD |
| Valparaíso (16) | 7 | Luis Cuello | PCCh |
| Valparaíso (16) | 7 | Andrés Celis Montt | RN |
| Valparaíso (16) | 7 | Hotuiti Teao | Ind-EVO |
| Valparaíso (16) | 7 | Luis Fernando Sánchez Ossa | PLR |
| Santiago (47) | 8 | Carmen Hertz Cádiz | PCCh |
| Santiago (47) | 8 | Claudia Mix | COM |
| Santiago (47) | 8 | Joaquín Lavín | UDI |
| Santiago (47) | 8 | Cristián Labbé Martínez | UDI |
| Santiago (47) | 8 | Agustín Romero | PLR |
| Santiago (47) | 8 | Viviana Delgado | PEV |
| Santiago (47) | 8 | Alberto Undurraga Vicuña | PDC |
| Santiago (47) | 8 | Rubén Oyarzo | PDG |
| Santiago (47) | 9 | Karol Cariola Oliva | PCCh |
| Santiago (47) | 9 | Boris Barrera | PCCh |
| Santiago (47) | 9 | Maite Orsini Pascal | RD |
| Santiago (47) | 9 | Andrés Giordano | Ind-RD |
| Santiago (47) | 9 | Jorge Durán Espinoza | RN |
| Santiago (47) | 9 | Érika Olivera de la Fuente | Ind-RN |
| Santiago (47) | 9 | José Carlos Meza | PLR |
| Santiago (47) | 10 | Gonzalo Winter Etcheberry | CS |
| Santiago (47) | 10 | Lorena Fries | Ind-CS |
| Santiago (47) | 10 | Emilia Schneider Videla | COM |
| Santiago (47) | 10 | Alejandra Placencia | PCCh |
| Santiago (47) | 10 | Jorge Alessandri Vergara | UDI |
| Santiago (47) | 10 | María Luisa Cordero Velásquez | Ind-RN |
| Santiago (47) | 10 | Johannes Kaiser Barents-Von Hohenhagen | PNL |
| Santiago (47) | 10 | Helia Molina Milman | PPD |
| Santiago (47) | 11 | Gonzalo de la Carrera Correa | PNL |
| Santiago (47) | 11 | Cristián Araya Lerdo de Tejada | PLR |
| Santiago (47) | 11 | Francisco Undurraga Gazitúa | EVO |
| Santiago (47) | 11 | Guillermo Ramírez Diez | UDI |
| Santiago (47) | 11 | Catalina del Real | RN |
| Santiago (47) | 11 | Tomás Hirsch Goldschmidt | Ind. |
| Santiago (47) | 12 | Pamela Jiles Moreno | PH |
| Santiago (47) | 12 | Hernán Palma Pérez | PH |
| Santiago (47) | 12 | Mónica Arce | Ind-PH |
| Santiago (47) | 12 | Ximena Ossandón Irarrázabal | RN |
| Santiago (47) | 12 | Álvaro Carter | Ind-UDI |
| Santiago (47) | 12 | Ana María Gazmuri Vieira | Ind. |
| Santiago (47) | 12 | Daniela Serrano Salazar | PCCh |
| Santiago (47) | 13 | Gael Yeomans Araya | CS |
| Santiago (47) | 13 | Lorena Pizarro | PCCh |
| Santiago (47) | 13 | Eduardo Durán | RN |
| Santiago (47) | 13 | Cristhian Moreira | UDI |
| Santiago (47) | 13 | Daniel Melo Contreras | PS |
| Santiago (47) | 14 | Marisela Santibáñez Novoa | PCCh |
| Santiago (47) | 14 | Camila Musante | Ind. |
| Santiago (47) | 14 | Raúl Leiva | PS |
| Santiago (47) | 14 | Leonardo Soto | PS |
| Santiago (47) | 14 | Juan Antonio Coloma Álamos | UDI |
| Santiago (47) | 14 | Juan Irarrázaval | PLR |
| O'Higgins (9) | 15 | Raúl Soto Mardones | PPD |
| O'Higgins (9) | 15 | Marta González Olea | Ind-PPD |
| O'Higgins (9) | 15 | Diego Schalper Sepúlveda | RN |
| O'Higgins (9) | 15 | Natalia Romero Talguia | UDI |
| O'Higgins (9) | 15 | Marcela Riquelme Aliaga | CS |
| O'Higgins (9) | 16 | Carla Morales | RN |
| O'Higgins (9) | 16 | Eduardo Cornejo Lagos | UDI |
| O'Higgins (9) | 16 | Cosme Mellado | Ind-PR |
| O'Higgins (9) | 16 | Félix Bugueño | FRVS |
| Maule (11) | 17 | Hugo Rey | RN |
| Maule (11) | 17 | Jorge Guzmán Zepeda | EVO |
| Maule (11) | 17 | Felipe Donoso | UDI |
| Maule (11) | 17 | Alexis Sepúlveda | PR |
| Maule (11) | 17 | Benjamín Moreno Bascur | PLR |
| Maule (11) | 17 | Mercedes Bulnes | Ind-CS |
| Maule (11) | 17 | Francisco Pulgar | Ind-PDG |
| Maule (11) | 18 | Paula Labra | Ind-RN |
| Maule (11) | 18 | Gustavo Benavente | UDI |
| Maule (11) | 18 | Jaime Naranjo Ortiz | PS |
| Maule (11) | 18 | Consuelo Veloso | RD |
| Ñuble (5) | 19 | Cristóbal Martínez | UDI |
| Ñuble (5) | 19 | Marta Bravo | UDI |
| Ñuble (5) | 19 | Frank Sauerbaum | RN |
| Ñuble (5) | 19 | Felipe Camaño | Ind-PDC |
| Ñuble (5) | 19 | Sara Concha | PSC |
| Biobío (13) | 20 | Francesca Muñoz González | PSC |
| Biobío (13) | 20 | Sergio Bobadilla | UDI |
| Biobío (13) | 20 | Marlene Pérez | Ind-UDI |
| Biobío (13) | 20 | Leonidas Romero | PLR |
| Biobío (13) | 20 | Eric Aedo Jeldres | PDC |
| Biobío (13) | 20 | Félix González Gatica | PEV |
| Biobío (13) | 20 | María Candelaria Acevedo Sáez | PCCh |
| Biobío (13) | 20 | Roberto Enrique Arroyo | PSC |
| Biobío (13) | 21 | Joanna Pérez | PDC |
| Biobío (13) | 21 | Cristóbal Urruticoechea Ríos | PLR |
| Biobío (13) | 21 | Flor Weisse | UDI |
| Biobío (13) | 21 | Karen Medina Vásquez | PDG |
| Biobío (13) | 21 | Clara Sagardía | Ind-CS |
| Araucanía (11) | 22 | Jorge Rathgeb | RN |
| Araucanía (11) | 22 | Juan Carlos Beltrán | RN |
| Araucanía (11) | 22 | Jorge Saffirio | PDC |
| Araucanía (11) | 22 | Gloria Naveillan Arriagada | PNL |
| Araucanía (11) | 23 | Henry Leal | UDI |
| Araucanía (11) | 23 | Miguel Becker | RN |
| Araucanía (11) | 23 | Miguel Mellado Suazo | RN |
| Araucanía (11) | 23 | Mauricio Ojeda | Ind-PLR |
| Araucanía (11) | 23 | Stephan Schubert | Ind-PLR |
| Araucanía (11) | 23 | Andrés Jouannet Valderrama | Ind-PR |
| Araucanía (11) | 23 | Ericka Ñanco | RD |
| Los Ríos (5) | 24 | Marcos Ilabaca | PS |
| Los Ríos (5) | 24 | Ana María Bravo | PS |
| Los Ríos (5) | 24 | Gastón von Mühlenbrock | UDI |
| Los Ríos (5) | 24 | Bernardo Berger | Ind-RN |
| Los Ríos (5) | 24 | Patricio Rosas | Ind-CS |
| Los Lagos (9) | 25 | Emilia Nuyado Ancapichún | PS |
| Los Lagos (9) | 25 | Héctor Barría | PDC |
| Los Lagos (9) | 25 | Daniel Lilayu | UDI |
| Los Lagos (9) | 25 | Harry Jürgensen Rundshagen | Ind-PLR |
| Los Lagos (9) | 26 | Alejandro Bernales Maldonado | PL |
| Los Lagos (9) | 26 | Héctor Ulloa Aguilera | Ind-PPD |
| Los Lagos (9) | 26 | Mauro González Villarroel | RN |
| Los Lagos (9) | 26 | Fernando Bórquez | Ind-UDI |
| Los Lagos (9) | 26 | Jaime Sáez Quiroz | RD |
| Aysén (3) | 27 | Miguel Ángel Calisto | PDC |
| Aysén (3) | 27 | René Alinco Bustos | Ind-PPD |
| Aysén (3) | 27 | Marcia Raphael | RN |
| Magallanes (3) | 28 | Carlos Bianchi Chelech | Ind-PPD |
| Magallanes (3) | 28 | Christian Matheson | Ind-EVO |
| Magallanes (3) | 28 | Javiera Morales | Ind-CS |

==== Presidents of the Chamber of Deputies ====
| Start | End | President | Party | |
|---|---|---|---|---|
| 11 March 2022 | 7 November 2022 | Raúl Soto Mardones | 25px | PPD |
| 7 November 2022 | 24 July 2023 | Vlado Mirosevic Verdugo | 25px | PL |
| 24 July 2023 | 15 April 2024 | Ricardo Cifuentes Lillo | 25px | PDC |
| 15 April 2024 | 16 March 2025 | Karol Cariola Oliva | 25px | PCCh |
| 7 April 2025 | Incumbent | José Miguel Castro Bascuñán | 25px | RN |

==== Vice Presidents of the Chamber of Deputies ====
| Period | Office | Name | Party |
|---|---|---|---|
| 2022 | First Vice President | Alexis Sepúlveda Soto | PR |
| 2022 | Second Vice President | Claudia Mix Jiménez | COM |
| 2022–2023 | First Vice President | Carlos Bianchi Chelech | Ind-PPD |
| 2023 | First Vice President | Cristian Tapia Ramos | Ind-PPD |
| 2022–2023 | Second Vice President | Catalina Pérez Salinas | RD |
| 2023–2024 | First Vice President | Carmen Hertz Cádiz | PCCh |
| 2023–2024 | Second Vice President | Daniella Cicardini Milla | PS |
| 2024–present | First Vice President | Gaspar Rivas Sánchez | Independent |
| 2024–present | Second Vice President | Eric Aedo Jeldres | PDC |

Political affiliation changes
| Name | From | To | District | |
|---|---|---|---|---|
| Enrique Lee | Ind-PRI | Ind-PDG | 1 | Elected as an independent in a seat of the Democratic Independent Regionalist Party. After the legal dissolution of the PRI, he joined the Evópoli bench, but in May 2022 he was expelled from it after signing a constitutional accusation against former foreign minister Andrés Allamand. In July 2022 he joined the bench of the Party of the People. |
| Johannes Kaiser | PRCh | Ind-PRCh | 10 | After his election, several misogynistic and xenophobic statements made by Kaiser went viral, which led the Republican Party to announce that they would consider his expulsion. In response, Kaiser resigned his party membership. However, he continues to be part of the party's bench. |
| Gonzalo de la Carrera | PRCh | Ind | 11 | After his election, the deputy resigned from the Republican Party due to a series of controversies. |
| Tomás Hirsch | Ind-COM | AH | 11 | The deputy was elected as an independent in a seat of Comunes, but the party in formation "Humanist Action" was constituted in November 2022; he then joined it as a member, as its president. |
| Ana María Gazmuri | Ind-COM | AH | 12 | The deputy was elected as an independent in a seat of Comunes, but the party in formation "Humanist Action" was constituted in November 2022; she then joined it as a member. |
| Pamela Jiles | PH | Ind. | 12 | The deputy was elected as a member of the Humanist Party. She ceased to be part of the party and is currently part of the bench of Green Ecologist and Independents. |
| Mónica Arce | Ind-PH | Ind. | 12 | The deputy was elected as an independent in a seat of the Humanist Party. At present she is part of the bench of Green Ecologist and Independents. |
| Camila Musante | Ind-COM | Ind | 14 | The deputy was elected as an independent in a seat of Comunes, but before the start of the new parliamentary period her entry into the mixed committee of the PC, FREVS and independents was announced; however, she resigned from it in January 2023. |
| Francisco Pulgar | Ind-CU | Ind-PDG | 17 | The deputy was elected as an independent in a seat of United Center, a party that was dissolved for failing to obtain the minimum results to maintain its legal existence. In response, he joined the bench of the Party of the People as an independent. |
| Mercedes Bulnes | Ind-RD | Ind-CS | 17 | Convergence Social supported her candidacy, but because it lacked legal status in her district she was registered in a seat of Democratic Revolution. She would join the bench of the former party. |
| Sara Concha | PCC | PSC | 19 | The Christian Conservative party was dissolved after the election for failing to reach the minimum results required for its subsistence. Sara Concha joined the National Renewal bench as an independent, resigned in December 2022, and joined the party in formation "Christian Social Party". |
| Leonidas Romero | RN | PRCh | 20 | Re-elected for National Renewal, before the start of the new parliamentary period he announced his change of party affiliation. |
| Héctor Ulloa | Ind-CIU | Ind-PPD | 26 | The Citizens party was dissolved for failing to achieve the minimum results required. Hector Ulloa joined the bench of the Party for Democracy as an independent. |
| Carlos Bianchi | Ind. | Ind-PPD | 28 | He joined the bench of the Party for Democracy as an independent from the installation of the new chamber. |
| Johannes Kaiser | Ind-PSC | National Libertarian Party | 10 | He founded the National Libertarian Party. |
| Gonzalo de la Carrera | Ind-PSC | National Libertarian Party | 11 | He joined the National Libertarian Party as a founding member. |
| Gloria Naveillán | Ind-PSC | National Libertarian Party | 22 | She joined the National Libertarian Party as a founding member. |
| Cristóbal Urruticoechea | Ind-PRCh | National Libertarian Party | 21 | He joined the National Libertarian Party. |
| Leónidas Romero | Ind-PRCh | National Libertarian Party | 20 | He joined the National Libertarian Party. |
