= District 12 (Chamber of Deputies of Chile) =

Electoral district of the Chamber of Deputies of Chile

- Distrito 12
- Electoral District for the Chamber of Deputies
- Location of District 12 within Chile
- Commune: List: La Florida; La Pintana; Pirque; Puente Alto; San José de Maipo
- Region: Santiago
- Population: 1,157,067 (2017)
- Electorate: 889,439 (2021)
- Area: 5,617 km^{2} (2020)

Current Electoral District
- Created: 2017
- Seats: 7 (2017–present)
- Deputies: List: Mónica Arce (Ind); Álvaro Carter (Ind); Ana María Gazmuri (PAH); Pamela Jiles (PH); Ximena Ossandón (RN); Hernán Palma (Ind); Daniela Serrano (PC)

District 12 (Spanish: Distrito 12) is one of the 28 multi-member electoral districts of the Chamber of Deputies, the lower house of the National Congress, the national legislature of Chile. The district was created by the 2015 electoral reform and came into being at the following general election in 2017. It consists of the communes of La Florida, La Pintana, Pirque, Puente Alto and San José de Maipo in the region of Santiago. The district currently elects seven of the 155 members of the Chamber of Deputies using the open party-list proportional representation electoral system. At the 2021 general election the district had 889,439 registered electors.

== Electoral system ==
District 12 currently elects seven of the 155 members of the Chamber of Deputies using the open party-list proportional representation electoral system. Parties may form electoral pacts with each other to pool their votes and increase their chances of winning seats. However, the number of candidates nominated by an electoral pact may not exceed the maximum number of candidates that a single party may nominate. Seats are allocated using the D'Hondt method.

== Election results ==
=== Summary ===
Election	Apruebo Dignidad AD / FA			Green Ecologists PEV			Dignidad Ahora DA			New Social Pact NPS / NM			Democratic Convergence CD			Chile Vamos Podemos / Vamos			Party of the People PDG			Christian Social Front FSC		
Election	Votes	%	Seats	Votes	%	Seats	Votes	%	Seats	Votes	%	Seats	Votes	%	Seats	Votes	%	Seats	Votes	%	Seats	Votes	%	Seats
2021	84,734	21.61%	2	24,852	6.34%	0	104,676	26.70%	3	16,214	4.14%	0				84,687	21.60%	2	23,037	5.88%	0	32,808	8.37%	0
2017	95,767	27.46%	2							80,778	23.16%	2	11,455	3.28%	0	131,894	37.81%	3						

=== Detailed ===
==== 2021 ====
Results of the 2021 general election held on 21 November 2021:

Party		Pact	Party								Pact		
Party		Pact	Votes per commune					Total votes	%	Seats	Votes	%	Seats
Party		Pact	La Florida	La Pintana	Pirque	Puente Alto	San José de Maipo	Total votes	%	Seats	Votes	%	Seats
Humanist Party	PH	Dignidad Ahora	24,011	17,036	2,091	35,639	1,540	80,317	20.49%	3	104,676	26.70%	3
Equality Party	IGUAL	Dignidad Ahora	3,162	835	430	19,662	270	24,359	6.21%	0	104,676	26.70%	3
Comunes	COM	Apruebo Dignidad	12,479	2,812	866	11,825	624	28,606	7.30%	1	84,734	21.61%	2
Communist Party of Chile	PC	Apruebo Dignidad	11,779	3,296	465	10,144	477	26,161	6.67%	1	84,734	21.61%	2
Democratic Revolution	RD	Apruebo Dignidad	8,217	1,311	450	7,465	362	17,805	4.54%	0	84,734	21.61%	2
Social Convergence	CS	Apruebo Dignidad	6,105	1,023	248	4,611	175	12,162	3.10%	0	84,734	21.61%	2
National Renewal	RN	Chile Podemos +	12,734	3,369	2,413	27,207	1,017	46,740	11.92%	1	84,687	21.60%	2
Independent Democratic Union	UDI	Chile Podemos +	25,668	1,190	775	8,431	343	36,407	9.29%	1	84,687	21.60%	2
Evópoli	EVO	Chile Podemos +	683	140	132	542	43	1,540	0.39%	0	84,687	21.60%	2
Republican Party	REP	Christian Social Front	12,987	4,328	1,610	13,235	648	32,808	8.37%	0	32,808	8.37%	0
Green Ecologist Party	PEV		10,559	2,973	705	10,036	579	24,852	6.34%	0	24,852	6.34%	0
Party of the People	PDG		7,199	3,933	490	11,145	270	23,037	5.88%	0	23,037	5.88%	0
Socialist Party of Chile	PS	New Social Pact	1,952	400	177	2,081	275	4,885	1.25%	0	16,214	4.14%	0
Christian Democratic Party	PDC	New Social Pact	1,441	581	96	1,101	69	3,288	0.84%	0	16,214	4.14%	0
Liberal Party of Chile	PL	New Social Pact	1,218	339	71	1,084	60	2,772	0.71%	0	16,214	4.14%	0
Citizens	CIU	New Social Pact	1,050	354	42	954	44	2,444	0.62%	0	16,214	4.14%	0
Radical Party of Chile	PR	New Social Pact	387	613	45	435	32	1,512	0.39%	0	16,214	4.14%	0
Party for Democracy	PPD	New Social Pact	529	288	41	442	13	1,313	0.33%	0	16,214	4.14%	0
United Centre	CU	United Independents	2,726	1,192	333	3,339	183	7,773	1.98%	0	7,773	1.98%	0
Revolutionary Workers Party	PTR		1,497	865	144	2,654	93	5,253	1.34%	0	5,253	1.34%	0
Patriotic Union	UPA		1,465	979	114	1,962	75	4,595	1.17%	0	4,595	1.17%	0
Progressive Party	PRO		1,134	505	80	1,669	46	3,434	0.88%	0	3,434	0.88%	0
Valid votes			148,982	48,362	11,818	175,663	7,238	392,063	100.00%	7	392,063	100.00%	7
Blank votes			6,211	3,548	600	7,512	424	18,295	4.26%				
Rejected votes – other			6,127	3,629	438	8,606	414	19,214	4.47%				
Total polled			161,320	55,539	12,856	191,781	8,076	429,572	48.30%				
Registered electors			308,805	137,994	23,505	403,129	16,006	889,439					
Turnout			52.24%	40.25%	54.69%	47.57%	50.46%	48.30%					

The following candidates were elected: Mónica Arce (PH), 981 votes; Álvaro Carter (UDI), 31,096 votes; Ana María Gazmuri (COM), 28,606 votes; Pamela Jiles (PH), 77,593 votes; Ximena Ossandón (RN), 40,931 votes; Hernán Palma (PH), 940 votes; and Daniela Serrano (PC), 14,776 votes.

==== 2017 ====
Results of the 2017 general election held on 19 November 2017:

Party		Pact	Party								Pact		
Party		Pact	Votes per commune					Total votes	%	Seats	Votes	%	Seats
Party		Pact	La Florida	La Pintana	Pirque	Puente Alto	San José de Maipo	Total votes	%	Seats	Votes	%	Seats
National Renewal	RN	Chile Vamos	24,954	9,225	4,427	54,606	2,121	95,333	27.33%	2	131,894	37.81%	3
Independent Democratic Union	UDI	Chile Vamos	27,157	2,488	536	6,055	325	36,561	10.48%	1	131,894	37.81%	3
Humanist Party	PH	Broad Front	21,249	5,634	727	20,872	1,017	49,499	14.19%	1	95,767	27.46%	2
Democratic Revolution	RD	Broad Front	13,259	2,400	515	14,892	369	31,435	9.01%	1	95,767	27.46%	2
Citizen Power	PODER	Broad Front	3,669	2,483	122	4,551	144	10,969	3.14%	0	95,767	27.46%	2
Equality Party	IGUAL	Broad Front	1,846	552	35	1,397	34	3,864	1.11%	0	95,767	27.46%	2
Communist Party of Chile	PC	Nueva Mayoría	25,403	7,663	772	19,292	993	54,123	15.52%	2	80,778	23.16%	2
Socialist Party of Chile	PS	Nueva Mayoría	5,692	3,202	342	7,914	544	17,694	5.07%	0	80,778	23.16%	2
Party for Democracy	PPD	Nueva Mayoría	1,574	1,285	1,693	2,014	198	6,764	1.94%	0	80,778	23.16%	2
Social Democrat Radical Party	PRSD	Nueva Mayoría	937	481	29	699	51	2,197	0.63%	0	80,778	23.16%	2
Progressive Party	PRO	All Over Chile	5,357	2,823	218	5,563	255	14,216	4.08%	0	14,216	4.08%	0
Christian Democratic Party	PDC	Democratic Convergence	4,658	2,267	202	4,116	212	11,455	3.28%	0	11,455	3.28%	0
Patricio Muñoz Cardenas (Independent)	Ind		4,072	1,733	184	4,078	155	10,222	2.93%	0	10,222	2.93%	0
Patriotic Union	UPA		1,700	993	85	1,621	71	4,470	1.28%	0	4,470	1.28%	0
Valid votes			141,527	43,229	9,887	147,670	6,489	348,802	100.00%	7	348,802	100.00%	7
Blank votes			7,033	3,614	387	7,065	435	18,534	4.78%				
Rejected votes – other			7,377	3,616	361	8,425	402	20,181	5.21%				
Total polled			155,937	50,459	10,635	163,160	7,326	387,517	45.17%				
Registered electors			301,998	137,423	20,881	382,776	14,860	857,938					
Turnout			51.64%	36.72%	50.93%	42.63%	49.30%	45.17%					

The following candidates were elected: Álvaro Carter (UDI), 27,491 votes; Miguel Crispi (RD), 25,569 votes; Pamela Jiles (PH), 45,222 votes; Amaro Labra (PC), 6,316 votes; Ximena Ossandón (RN), 52,484 votes; Leopoldo Pérez (RN), 29,984 votes; and Camila Vallejo (PC), 47,807 votes.
