= Hernán Palma =

Chilean politician (born 1958)

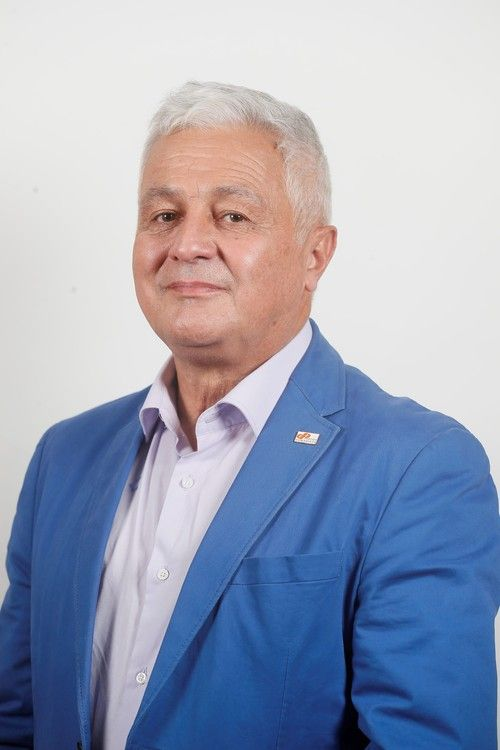

Member of the Chamber of Deputies of Chile
- In office 11 March 2022 – 11 March 2026
- Constituency: District 12

Personal details
- Born: 3 November 1958 (age 67) Santiago, Chile
- Party: Humanist Party (PH)
- Education: University of Chile
- Occupation: Politician
- Profession: Physician

Luis Hugo Hernán Palma Pérez (born November 3, 1958) is a Chilean surgeon and politician, founding member of the Humanist Party of Chile. He is a deputy for the period 2022-2026, after being elected in the 2021 Chilean parliamentary elections.

== Biography ==
Hernán Palma grew up in the town of San Joaquín, in the commune of Pedro Aguirre Cerda. He studied medicine at the University of Chile, graduating in 1984 as a surgeon. He has trained in the rehabilitation of people, especially young people with problematic substance use. During the eighties, he moved to Puente Alto, a commune where he has resided since then. There he was one of the founding members of the Humanist Party, becoming a friend of Laura Rodríguez. He carried out work as an activist in communal soup kitchens, workers' ministry, camps, visiting political prisoners, supporting human rights victims and cooperating in the management of the 1988 plebiscite.

Subsequently, he has practiced his profession for more than three decades, as well as participating in a foundation that provides services to Sename programs. Likewise, he ran for the position of councilor for Puente Alto as an independent candidate in the 1992 municipal elections and for the Humanist Party in 1996, 2000 and 2004, without being elected. He also ran for the Chamber of Deputies in 1997, without being elected either.

=== 2021 elections ===
In 2021, he participated in the conventional constituent elections for District 12, as the only candidate on his list, but was not elected. However, in the legislative elections of that same year, he was elected deputy for the same district with 0.24%, along with his colleagues on the Dignidad Ahora list, Pamela Jiles and Mónica Arce. He was the elected representative with the fewest votes in that election.

After the 2021 elections, the Humanist Party was dissolved for not achieving the minimum necessary vote. In this context, Hernán Palma was elected as General Secretary of the party, in a 6-month provisional directive, whose objective is to achieve the relegalization of the party and lead a refoundation process.

He assumed the position of deputy on March 11, 2022. He is currently part of the permanent commissions on Human Rights and Indigenous Peoples, and Health. At the beginning of the legislative period he joined the Communist, FREVS and independent benches.
