= Ossandón =

Ossandón is a surname. Notable people with the surname include:

- Agustín Edwards Ossandón (1815–1878), Chilean businessperson, banker, and politician
- Fabián Ossandón (fl. from 2021), Chilean civil engineer and politician
- Jorge Ossandón (born 1985), Chilean politician
- Juan José Ossandón (born 1977), Chilean footballer
- Manuel José Ossandón Lira (born 1987), Chilean lawyer and politician
- Ximena Ossandón (born 1963), Chilean teacher, businesswoman, and politician
