= Daniela Serrano =

Chilean politician (born 1995)

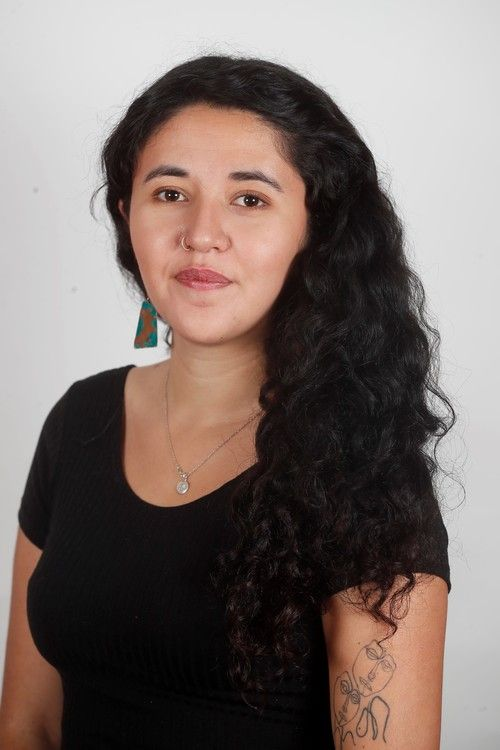

Member of the Chamber of Deputies
- Incumbent
- Assumed office 11 March 2022
- Preceded by: Camila Vallejo
- Constituency: District 12

Personal details
- Born: 17 March 1995 (age 31) Santiago, Chile
- Party: Communist Party (PC)
- Education: University of Chile
- Occupation: Politician
- Profession: Public Administrator

Daniela Andrea Serrano Salazar (born March 17, 1995) is a student of public administration and Chilean politician, a member of the Communist Party of Chile (PCCh), who has served as president of Communist Youth of Chile since 2021. In the 2021 parliamentary elections, she was elected as a representative of the Republic representing District 12 (corresponding to the communes of La Florida, La Pintana, Pirque, Puente Alto and San José de Maipo), for the 2022-2026 legislative period.

With studies at the University of Chile, she was a student leader during his time at the university.

== Biography ==
She was a student leader in 2011 as president of the Liceo Javiera Carrera, and territorial manager of the Youth in 2017, then fulfilling internal responsibilities at the Regional University of Chile in 2018, and now she is a member of the leadership of the youth wing of the PC, elected with total parity.

Daniela Serrano Salazar is president of the Communist Youth of Chile; She has been active in the JJ.CC since 2010, where she has fulfilled various internal responsibilities, including being a member of the Central Committee of the JJ.CC. in 2015, and the Central Committee of the Communist Party in 2020.

In 2021 she was elected president of the Communist Youth.

== Political career ==
For the 2021 parliamentary elections, it was announced that she would be a candidate for deputy for District 12, covering the quota of Camila Vallejo who did not present a candidacy for re-election. In the elections, held on November 21, Serrano was elected with 3.75% of the votes.
