= Ana María Gazmuri =

Chilean actress and politician

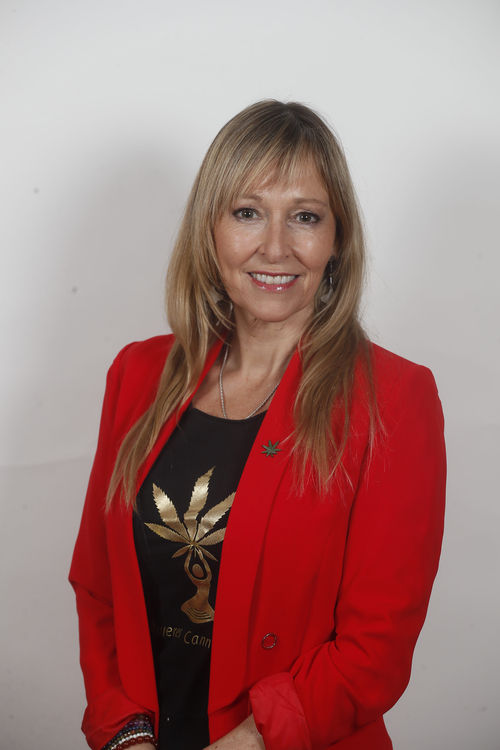
- Gazmuri in 2022

Member of the Chamber of Deputies
- Incumbent
- Assumed office 11 March 2022
- Constituency: District 12

Personal details
- Born: 22 January 1966 (age 60) Santiago, Chile
- Party: Humanist Action (2022–)
- Other political affiliations: RD (2016–2019)
- Education: Pontifical Catholic University of Chile
- Occupation: Politician
- Profession: Journalist

Ana María Gazmuri Vieira (born 22 January 1966) is a Chilean actress, politician and activist.

Daughter of the agronomist Renato Gazmuri Schleyer and the sociologist and writer Ana María Vieira, she is the eldest of six siblings. Sister of also actress Victoria Gazmuri and niece of politician María Olivia Gazmuri Schleyer. She studied from first to third grade in Necochea (Argentina), and then returned to Chile to continue her primary studies at La Maisonette schools, Lo Castillo and the Liceo 14. First she began to study journalism at the Pontifical Catholic University of Chile, but the following year she began to study theater with Fernando González. She was married to television director Cristián Mason. She is currently married to Nicolás Dormal.

Her debut on television was with the telenovela Bellas y audaces (1988) with the leading role of Fernanda, where she shared credits with Sonia Viveros, Osvaldo Silva and Luz Jiménez. She continued to work in telenovelas such as Jaque Mate, Amor a Domicilio, to consecrate herself in Ámame (1993) as Francisca García-Méndez. Her last participation so far was in Mujeres de lujo (2010).

He came to the big screen with the film Todo por nada (1989), by Alfredo Lamadrid, El País de Octubre and Viva el Novio. Later, from 2003 to 2012, she was part of the stable cast of comedian actors from Chilevisión at Teatro en Chilevisión.

She is currently the executive director of Fundación Daya, founded by her and her husband Nicolás Dormal, which promotes the use of alternative therapies, mainly Medical cannabis.

She was registered as a candidate for deputy in the 2021 parliamentary elections as an independent under Comunes party quota in district 12, on the list of the conglomerate Apruebo Dignidad. In the November 21 elections, she was elected with 7.2% of the votes.

== Biography ==
She completed her primary education from first to third grade in the city of Necochea, Argentina. She later returned to Chile to continue her primary studies at Colegio La Maisonette, Colegio Lo Castillo, and Liceo 14. She completed her secondary education at Liceo B No. 66 Amanda Labarca, graduating in 1983.

She later enrolled in Journalism at the Pontifical Catholic University of Chile, studying the program for one year before entering the acting academy of Fernando González to pursue theatre studies.

In 1988, she began her career as a television actress, appearing in the TVN telenovela Bellas y audaces (1988), followed by roles in Jaque mate and Ámame (1993). In 1995, she joined Canal 13 to participate in the telenovela Amor a Domicilio. She later appeared in productions such as Loca Piel (1996) on TVN; Santiago City (1997) and A todo dar (1997) on Mega; Corazón Pirata and Piel Canela (2001) on Canal 13; and Mala Conducta (2008) on Chilevisión. From 2003 to 2012, she was part of the stable cast of comedic actors on Chilevisión in the program Teatro en Chilevisión.

She also participated in several film projects, including Todo por nada (1989), El País de Octubre (1990), and ¡Viva el Novio! (1990). In theatre, one of her most notable performances was in the play Una Casa Vacía, based on the novel by Carlos Cerda and directed by Raúl Osorio, for which she received an award from the Association of Entertainment, Arts, and Culture Journalists of Chile (APES).

She worked as a cultural manager and artistic producer, serving as the director of the Festival “La Florida es Teatro” in 2001 and 2002. She also founded and directed the Youth Theatre School of La Florida.

Alongside her acting and cultural work, she pursued studies in complementary health and alternative therapies, receiving training in transpersonal psychology, Buddhist psychology, reiki, and flower therapy. She holds a diploma in Mindfulness and Compassion Cultivation Training (CCT). In 2012, she began studying the medicinal potential of cannabis, which led her in early 2014 to found Fundación Daya, where she served as executive director until 2021. Through this organization, she initiated her activism in the defense and promotion of cannabis cultivation for medicinal use.

== Political career ==
She was one of the public figures supporting the “No” option in the 1988 Chilean national plebiscite.

Between 2016 and 2019, she was a member of Democratic Revolution (RD).

She later served as spokesperson and coordinator of Comunidad por la Dignidad, an independent collective that succeeded in electing four members to the Chilean Constitutional Convention during the 2021–2022 constitutional process. She subsequently acted as national spokesperson for the presidential primary campaign of Daniel Jadue within the Apruebo Dignidad coalition.

In the parliamentary elections of November 2021, she was elected to the Chamber of Deputies of Chile for the 12th District—comprising the communes of La Florida, La Pintana, Pirque, Puente Alto, and San José de Maipo in the Metropolitan Region of Santiago—as an independent candidate on a list of the Comunes party within the Apruebo Dignidad pact, for the 2022–2026 legislative term. She obtained 28,606 votes, corresponding to 7.30% of the valid votes cast.

On 19 March 2022, she joined the Humanist Action party amid its process of legal recognition before the Electoral Service of Chile. In March 2023, she formally notified the Chamber of Deputies that she had become a member of the party, which was officially constituted on 9 December 2022.

== Filmography ==
=== Films ===
Film
Year	Film	Role
1989	Todo por nada	Alejandra
1990	El país de octubre	Pamela
1990	Viva el novio	Astrid

=== Telenovelas ===
Telenovelas
Year	Telenovela	Role	Channel
1988	Bellas y audaces	Fernanda Blanche	TVN
1989	Bravo	Cecilia Villar	Canal 13
1990	Acércate más	Cristina "Cris" Lecaros	Canal 13
1993	Jaque mate	Moureen del Río	TVN
1993	Ámame	Francisca García-Méndez	TVN
1995	Amor a domicilio	Rosario Undurraga	Canal 13
1996	Loca piel	Paula Green	TVN
1997	Santiago City	Gloria Vergara	Mega
1998	A todo dar	Débora Falco	Mega
2001	Corazón pirata	Mercedes Muñoz	Canal 13
2001	Piel canela	Oriana Marín	Canal 13
2004	Don Floro	Carmen	Mega
2004	Xfea2	Perla Montero	Mega
2007	Karkú	Rebeca Cruz	TVN
2008	Mala Conducta	Georgette Ventura	Chilevisión
2010	Mujeres de lujo		Chilevisión

=== TV Series ===
TV series
Year	Series	Role	Channel
1990	Crónica de un Hombre Santo	Rosa Markmann	Canal 13
1993	La Patrulla del Desierto	Constanza Larrondo	Canal 13
1996	Amor a domicilio, la comedia	Camila Undurraga	Canal 13
2003-2012	Teatro en Chilevisión	Varios personajes	Chilevisión
2010	Infieles	Rosario	Chilevisión
2011	Vampiras	Samantha	Chilevisión
