= Teresa Ossandón Guzmán =

Chilean Discalced Carmelite nun

- Teresa Ossandón Guzmán (right) with brother Carlos (left)
- Born: 28 April 1902; Santiago, Chile
- Died: 8 December 1988 (aged 86); Los Andes, Chile

María Teresa Luisa Ossandón Guzmán (28 April 1902 – 8 December 1988) was a Chilean tennis player, youth organiser, lecturer, writer, and Discalced Carmelite nun. She was the great aunt of politicians Manuel José Ossandón and Ximena Ossandón.

== Biography ==
Ossandón was born on 28 April 1902 to Carlos Ossandón Barros and Teresa Guzmán Cruz. She was the second of eight siblings: Carlos, Roberto, Arturo, Jorge, Pablo, Miguel, and Francisca. Her older brother, Carlos, was a tennis player, with whom she won multiple mixed doubles titles.

Ossandón studied at Colegio del Sagrado Corazón and practiced tennis from an early age. In 1917, she was crowned the Chilean junior girls tennis champion, and the following year won the title in the women's category. She quit tennis in 1923 to focus on her work with Catholic Action.

Under the direction of priest Rafael Edwards Salas, Ossandón helped organize the Association of Catholic Female Youth (Asociación de la Juventud Católica Femenina) in 1921.

Ossandón founded the women's branch of Catholic Action in Chile, Association of Catholic Women's Youth of Chile (Asociación de la Juventud Católica Femenina de Chile).

In 1923, Ossandón directed the publication of "Hacia el Ideal", the official publication of the Association of Catholic Women's Youth of Chile. The publication aimed to aid the moral and intellectual development of young women, inform them about national issues, and disseminate new ideas and models for Catholic women, whilst being inexpensive, entertaining and informative.

According to Maximiliano Salinas, during this time working with the Association of Catholic Women's Youth of Chile Ossandón met trade unionist Clotario Blest, who fell in love with her. The pair decided to never marry, instead dedicating themselves to their religious pursuits.

Ossandón died on 8 December 1988 in a convent in Los Andes.

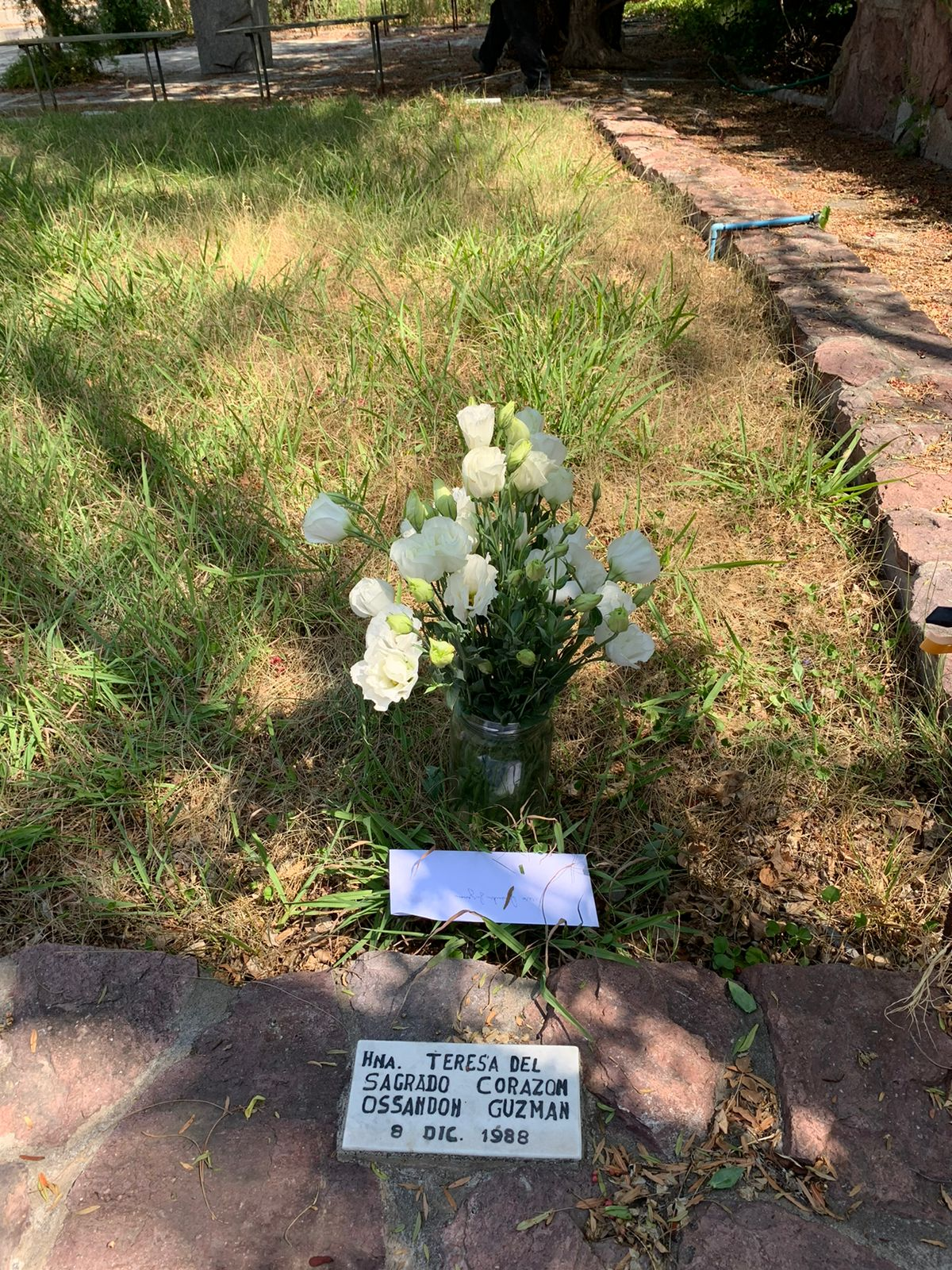
Teresa Ossandón Guzmán's grave

== Works ==
- Bécquer (1921, under the pen name Pepita Peralta)
- Por nuestra fe o los relatos de una socia, (1926)
- "La Acción Social de La Mujer en Chile" en Actividades femeninas en Chile: obra publicada con motivo del cincuentenario del decreto que concedió a la mujer chilena el derecho de validar sus exámenes secundarios (1928)
- Salvar… o las vacaciones de Cecilia (1932)
- Manual de la dirigenta de la A.J.C.F. (1936)
- Treinta días en Malloco (1938)
- La huella de Dios (1939)
- Luces del sagrario (1939)
- Luces del santo Evangelio (1941)
- Espera en Dios: breves reflexiones en algunas frases de los Santos (1950)
