= Tomás de Rementería Venegas =

Chilean politician

Tomás de Rementería
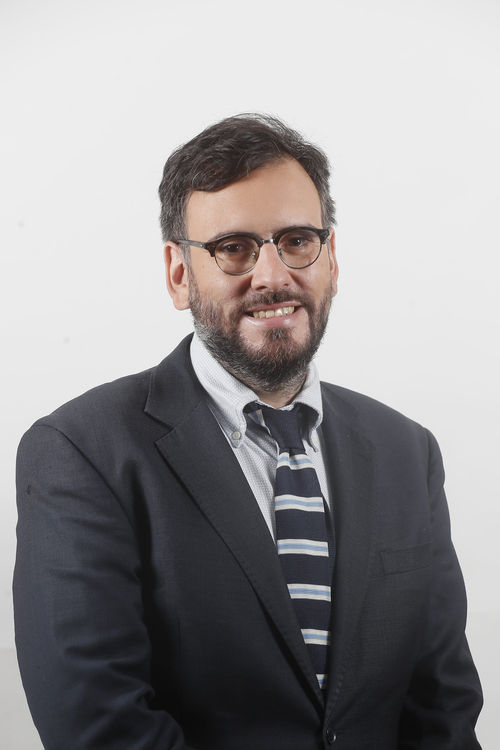

Member of the Chamber of Deputies of Chile
- Incumbent
- Assumed office 17 April 2025
- Preceded by: Isabel Allende
- Constituency: 7th district

Member of the Chamber of Deputies of Chile
- In office 17 April 2025 – 11 March 2026
- Constituency: 7th district

Personal details
- Born: 17 January 1987 (age 39) Santiago, Chile
- Party: Socialist Party

Tomás Eguzki de Rementería Venegas (born 17 January 1987) is a Chilean politician who served in the Senate of Chile.
