= Manuel José Ossandón Lira =

Chilean constituent

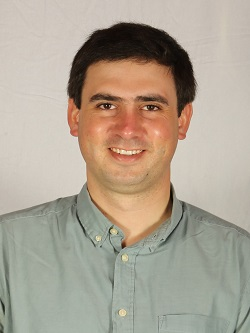

Member of the Constitutional Convention
- In office 4 July 2021 – 4 July 2022
- Constituency: 12th District

Personal details
- Born: 2 July 1987 (age 39) Santiago, Chile
- Party: Renovación Nacional
- Parent(s): Manuel José Ossandón (father); Paula Lira
- Relatives: Ximena Ossandón (aunt)
- Education: Pontifical Catholic University of Chile (LL.B)
- Occupation: Politician
- Profession: Lawyer

Manuel José Ossandón Lira (born 2 July 1987) is a Chilean lawyer and independent politician.

He was elected as a member of the Constitutional Council in 2021, representing the 12th District of the Metropolitan Region of Santiago.

== Early life and family ==
Ossandón was born on 2 July 1987 in Santiago, Chile. He is the son of Manuel José Ossandón Irarrázabal, former mayor of Pirque (1992–2000) and Puente Alto (2000–2012), and Senator for Santiago since 2014, and Paula Lira Correa.

He is the nephew of Ximena Ossandón, a deputy representing the 12th District of the Metropolitan Region.

He is married to María Paz Palomer Music.

== Professional career ==
Ossandón completed his primary and secondary education at Colegio San Isidro in the commune of Buin, graduating in 2005. He studied law at the Pontifical Catholic University of Chile between 2006 and 2010, earning a law degree. He also completed a minor in contemporary history at the same institution.

Between June 2016 and November 2018, he was a partner at the law firm Ossandón & Cía. Abogados, practicing in corporate, labor, real estate, civil, and criminal law. Since November 2018, he has worked as Of Counsel at Vermehren Abogados.

== Political career ==
Ossandón is an independent politician.

In the elections held on 15–16 May 2021, he ran as a candidate for the Constitutional Convention representing the 12th District of the Metropolitan Region as an independent on a seat supported by National Renewal (Chile), within the Vamos por Chile electoral pact. He obtained 13,831 votes, corresponding to 3.72% of the valid votes cast, and was elected as a member of the Convention.
