= Manuel José Ossandón =

Chilean politician (born 1962)

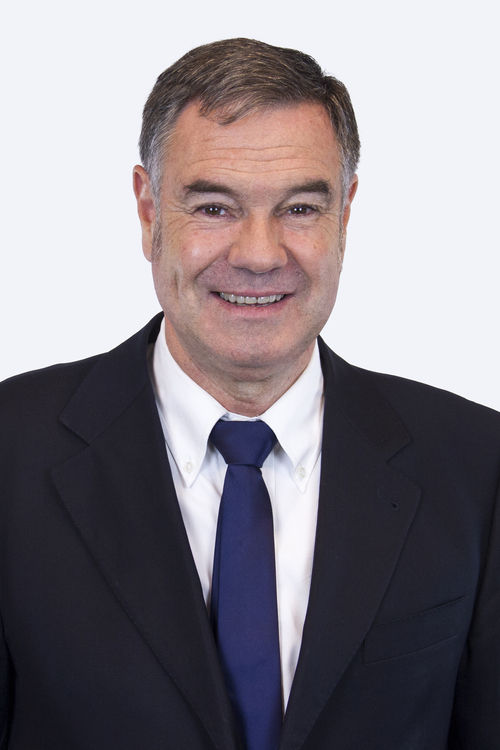

President of the Senate
- In office 26 March 2025 – 11 March 2026
- Preceded by: José García Ruminot
- Succeeded by: Paulina Núñez Urrutia

Member of the Senate
- Incumbent
- Assumed office 11 March 2014
- Preceded by: Ena von Baer
- Constituency: 7th Circumscription

Mayor of Puente Alto
- In office 6 December 2000 – 6 December 2012
- Preceded by: Sergio Roubilard
- Succeeded by: Germán Codina

Mayor of Pirque
- In office 6 September 1992 – 6 December 2000
- Preceded by: Hernan Prieto
- Succeeded by: Alejandro Rosales

Personal details
- Born: Manuel José Ossandón Irarrázabal; 24 August 1962 (age 64) Viña del Mar, Chile
- Party: Renovación Nacional
- Children: 8 (among them, Manuel)
- Relatives: Ximena Ossandón (sister)
- Education: National Institute of Professional Training of Chile; Adolfo Ibáñez University
- Occupation: Politician
- Profession: Agricultural technician

Manuel José Ossandón Irarrázabal (born 24 August 1962) is a Chilean agricultural technician and politician. Since March 2022, he has served as a senator of the Republic, representing the 7th Constituency (Santiago Metropolitan Region), elected in the 2021 parliamentary elections, for the 2022–2030 legislative term. Previously, he held the same office, representing the 8th Constituency, Santiago Oriente, during 2014–2022. Since March 26, 2025, he has served as President of the Senate of Chile.

He is a member of the National Renewal (RN) party, although he remained independent from July 2016 to July 2017, when he returned to the party. He served as mayor of the Santiago communes of Pirque for two consecutive terms, from 1992 to 2000, and Puente Alto for three consecutive terms between 2000 and 2012. His career has been marked by a social-conservative line.

In July 2017, he was a presidential pre-candidate for the center-right coalition Chile Vamos, running in the coalition’s primary, where he placed second behind former president of the Republic, Sebastián Piñera.

== Early life and education ==
Ossandón was born in Viña del Mar, on August 24, 1962. Son of Roberto Ossandón Valdés and Ximena Irarrázabal Correa, he is the brother of fellow RN politician Ximena Ossandón. He is married to Paula Lira Correa, with whom he has eight children, including Manuel José Ossandón Lira, who served as a member of the Constitutional Convention.

He completed his primary and secondary studies at Tabancura and Colegio de los Sagrados Corazones de Santiago. After finishing high school, he pursued higher education at the National Institute of Professional Training, Inacap, where he obtained the title of agricultural technician, later completing a diploma in business administration at Adolfo Ibáñez University.

From 1982 to 1992, he worked as a farmer and agricultural manager of Sociedad Agrícola Santa Magdalena.

== Political career ==
A self-described social Christian, Ossandón's platform has emphasized poverty reduction, increased quality of life, and anti-corruption.

Ossandón decided to run for mayor in the rural town of Pirque, a suburb of Santiago. He won with 21.86% of the votes and became mayor in 1992. He was re-elected for the next term, garnering 64.52% of the vote. In 2000, he decided to run for mayor in the largest municipality of Chile, Puente Alto. He won with 45% of the vote, was re-elected in 2004 with 60%, then re-elected again in 2008 with 70%.

Ossandón was elected a senator of Chile for the 8th Senatorial District in the parliamentarian elections of 2013, for the 2014–2022 period. He ran for president in 2017, receiving 27.6% of the vote in the presidential primaries (Sebastian Piñera won the candidacy with 57.5% of the vote). Ossandón submitted 34 motions in 2015, the most of any senator that year.

Ossandón was candidate to the primaries elections for the Chile Vamos coalition and the most popular candidate of the center right according to the CEP poll of 2016.

In May 2020, Ossandón contracted COVID-19 and recovered the following month. An opponent of same-sex marriage, he criticized President Sebastián Piñera for pushing the bill legalizing it in the Chilean Congress.

Ossandón was elected a senator of Chile for the 7th Senatorial District for the period 2022–2030, and became president of the Senate on 26 March 2025.

Political offices
Preceded by José García Ruminot	President of the Senate of Chile; 2025–2026	Succeeded by Paulina Núñez Urrutia
