= José García Ruminot =

Chilean politician (born 1955)

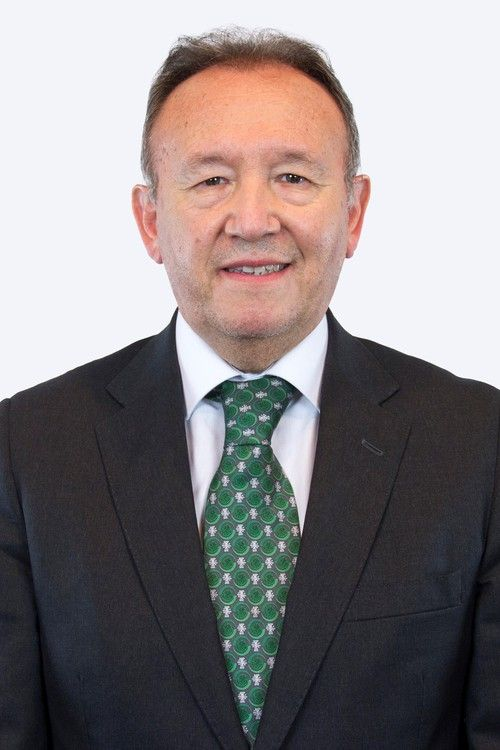
- Official portrait, 2022

Minister Secretary-General of the Presidency
- Incumbent
- Assumed office 11 March 2026
- President: José Antonio Kast
- Preceded by: Macarena Lobos

President of the Senate of Chile
- In office 19 March 2024 – 26 March 2025
- Preceded by: Juan Antonio Coloma Correa
- Succeeded by: Manuel José Ossandón

Member of the Senate of Chile
- In office 11 March 2002 – 11 March 2026
- Constituency: 15th District (2002–2018); 11th District (2018–2026)

Member of the Chamber of Deputies
- In office 11 March 1990 – 11 March 2002
- Preceded by: Constituency established
- Succeeded by: Germán Becker Alvear
- Constituency: 3rd District

Mayor of Temuco
- In office 23 June 1986 – 1 September 1989
- Appointed by: Augusto Pinochet
- Preceded by: Sergio Nordenflycht
- Succeeded by: René Araneda Amigo

Mayor of Lautaro
- In office 22 November 1984 – 23 June 1986
- Appointed by: Augusto Pinochet
- Preceded by: Mario Jorquera Rodríguez
- Succeeded by: Marta Sáenz Terpelle

Mayor of Toltén
- In office 20 June 1980 – 1 January 1982
- Appointed by: Augusto Pinochet
- Preceded by: Ernesto Lobos Virano
- Succeeded by: Miguel Becerra Espinoza

Personal details
- Born: 22 May 1955 (age 71) Temuco, Chile
- Party: RN (since 1989)
- Other political affiliations: PN (1970–1973)
- Spouse: Dora Escobar
- Children: 2
- Education: Pontifical Catholic University of Chile; University of La Frontera
- Occupation: Accountant • Politician

José Gilberto García Ruminot (born 22 May 1955) is a Chilean politician and accountant who serves as Minister Secretary-General of the Presidency since 11 March 2026 during the presidency of José Antonio Kast.

He has served as member of the Senate of Chile. On 19 March 2024, he was elected President of the Senate.

== Biography ==
He was born on 22 May 1955 in Temuco. He is the son of Lorenzo Gilberto García Peña and Ondina Ruminot Leiva.

He is married to Doralisa Matilde Escobar Altamirano and is the father of two daughters, Loreto and Consuelo.

=== Professional career ===
He completed his primary education at the Instituto Claret de Temuco and his secondary education at the Instituto Superior de Comercio, where he obtained the professional qualification of General Accountant. He later studied at the University of La Frontera, earning degrees as a Public Accountant and Auditor.

He completed postgraduate studies in Socioeconomic Evaluation of Social Projects at the Pontifical Catholic University of Chile and a diploma in Tax Management at the University of La Frontera in Temuco.

Between 1975 and 1980, he worked as a professor of Accounting at the Instituto Superior de Comercio. In 1980, he joined the University of La Frontera as a lecturer, a position he held until 1989.

== Political beginnings ==
He began his political activity in 1970 as a secondary student leader and member of the Youth of the National Party. He later served as a university student leader until 1979.

During the military government, he held several public positions. In 1980, he was appointed Mayor of Toltén. Two years later, in 1982, he assumed the regional leadership of the Social Department of the Intendencia, where he was responsible for the creation of the Regional Ministerial Secretariat of Government, becoming the first individual to hold that position.

In 1984, he was appointed Mayor of Lautaro. Subsequently, on 23 June 1986, he assumed office as Mayor of Temuco, serving until 10 August 1989.

In May 1989, he joined Renovación Nacional, where he served on several occasions as vice president of the party.

== Parliamentary career ==
=== Chamber of Deputies (1990–2002) ===
In the 1989 parliamentary elections, he was elected to the Chamber of Deputies of Chile representing Renovación Nacional for District No. 50, corresponding to the commune of Temuco, for the 1990–1994 term. He served on the Standing Committees on Interior Government, Regionalization, Planning and Social Development, and Finance, as well as on the Special Committees on the National Budget and Indigenous Peoples.

He was re-elected in December 1993 for the 1994–1998 term, continuing his work on the Finance Committee and serving as a substitute member of the Agriculture, Forestry and Fisheries Committee.

In December 1997, he secured a third re-election for the 1998–2002 legislative term. During this period, he continued his work on the Finance Committee, served as head of the Renovación Nacional parliamentary caucus, and participated in the Chilean–German and Chilean–British Interparliamentary Groups.

=== Senate (2002–2026) ===
In December 2001, he was elected to the Senate of Chile representing the Araucanía South constituency for the 2002–2010 term. He chaired the Standing Committees on Economy, Promotion and Development, and on Transport and Telecommunications, and served on the Finance Committee, the Auditing Committee, and the Joint Special Committee on the Budget.

In June 2002, President Ricardo Lagos appointed him as a member of the National Commission for the Development of Biotechnology. In 2009, he was appointed President of the Inter-American Parliamentary Forum, an organization bringing together parliamentarians from finance and budget committees across the Americas, with technical support from the Inter-American Development Bank.

He was re-elected senator in the December 2009 parliamentary elections for the 2010–2018 term, representing the Araucanía South constituency. During this period, he chaired the Standing Committees on Economy and on Auditing, and served on the Committees on Finance, Agriculture, and the Joint Special Committee on the Budget.

In November 2017, he was re-elected senator for the newly created 11th Senatorial Constituency, Araucanía Region, representing Renovación Nacional within the Chile Vamos coalition. He obtained 33,493 votes, corresponding to 9.92% of the valid votes cast, and assumed office on 11 March 2018.

On 19 March 2024, he assumed the Presidency of the Senate, serving until 25 March 2025. His Senate leadership board included Senator Matías Walker as Vice President.

Between 2023 and 2024, he chaired the Standing Committees on Education and Internal Regime. He also served on the Finance Committee and has been a member of the Joint Special Committee on the Budget since 11 April 2018, as well as of the Fourth Joint Budget Subcommittee since 6 July 2022.
