= Ximena Ossandón =

Chilean politician (born 1963)

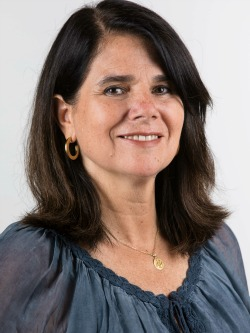

Member of the Chamber of Deputies
- Incumbent
- Assumed office 11 March 2018
- Preceded by: District created
- Constituency: District 12

Counceller of Puente Alto
- In office 6 December 2008 – 6 December 2012

Personal details
- Born: 13 December 1963 (age 62) Vina del Mar, Chile
- Party: Renovación Nacional
- Spouse: Luis Hernán Paul
- Children: Nine
- Parent(s): Raúl Celis Cornejo; Cecilia Montt Pascal
- Relatives: Manuel José (brother); Manuel Ossandón Lira (nephew)
- Education: Pontifical Catholic University of Chile (BA); University of the Andes, Chile (MA)
- Occupation: Politician
- Profession: English teacher

María Ximena Ossandón Irarrázabal (born 13 December 1963) is a Chilean teacher, businesswoman, and politician currently serving as a member of the Chamber of Deputies of Chile, representing District 12, which includes La Florida, Puente Alto, Pirque, La Pintana, and San José de Maipo.

A member of Renovación Nacional (RN), she is noted for her focus on public service, early childhood development, and community-based social equity, alongside her alignment with socially conservative values. Her political trajectory has developed alongside a prominent family network, being sister of senator Manuel José Ossandón and mother of Puente Alto councillor Bernardita Paul Ossandón.

Her parliamentary work has focused on security, drug policy, women’s equity, and institutional reform. She has held high-profile positions in committees, taken controversial positions within her party, and become one of the most visible conservative female figures in Chilean politics.

== Biography ==
Ossandón was born in Viña del Mar into a traditional and conservative Catholic family. She is the daughter of Roberto Ossandón Valdés and Ximena Irarrázabal Correa. Raised with her siblings Roberto, Rafael, Ignacio, Manuel José and Olga, she spent her early years in a rural property in Pirque before the family relocated to an apartment in Santiago.

She studied at Colegio Los Andes, a girls' school linked to Opus Dei, and later earned a degree in English pedagogy from the Pontifical Catholic University of Chile. From 2007 to 2009, she completed an Executive MBA at ESE Business School, part of the University of the Andes.

Before entering politics, she operated a small artisanal manjar (milk caramel) production business, supplying Santiago bakeries. She later served as executive manager at the travel company Mundotour.

== Political career ==
In the 2008 municipal elections, Ossandón was elected councillor of Puente Alto, where her brother Manuel José was mayor since 2000. Their joint role in the commune marked the beginning of what some analysts labeled ossandonismo, a political style that combined local conservatism, strong religious influence, and anti-elitist discourse.

In March 2010, during Sebastián Piñera's first government, she was appointed executive vice president of the National Board of Kindergartens (JUNJI). Her tenure, however, ended in December of the same year following controversy over comments where she described the institution’s salaries as "reguleques" (mediocre), which drew criticism from public employees and led to her resignation.

In 2013, she ran for a seat in the Chamber of Deputies representing District 26 (La Florida). Although she obtained 16,963 votes (11.11%), she was not elected due to the binomial electoral system in force at the time.

She returned to electoral competition in 2017, this time for the newly created District 12. Her candidacy aligned with her brother’s senatorial efforts and the broader Chile Vamos coalition. She won with over 52,000 votes (15.05%) and began her first term as deputy in March 2018.

During her first term, she served on the permanent committees of Health; Women and Gender Equity; Housing and Urban Development; and Public Works, Transport and Telecommunications. She also participated in investigative commissions addressing corruption cases in ENAP and ANFP, problems in child protection services, and oversight of state-run media.

She was re-elected in November 2021, again representing District 12, this time under the Chile Podemos Más coalition. Shortly after the election, she publicly declared her support for José Antonio Kast in the second round of the presidential election, citing his security agenda and defense of traditional values.
