= Paulina Núñez =

Chilean politician

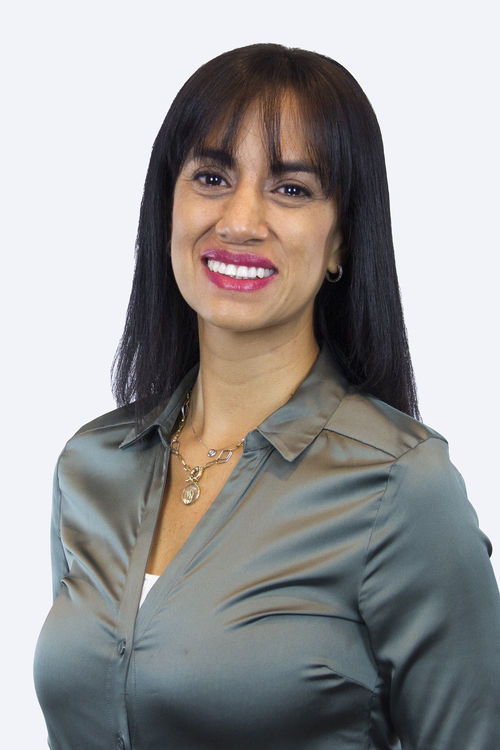
- Official portrait, 2022

President of the Senate
- Incumbent
- Assumed office 11 March 2026
- Preceded by: Manuel José Ossandón

Member of the Senate
- Incumbent
- Assumed office 11 March 2022
- Constituency: 3rd Circunscription (Antofagasta Region)

Member of the Chamber of Deputies
- In office 11 March 2018 – 11 March 2022
- Preceded by: Creation of the District
- Constituency: District 3
- In office 11 March 2014 – 11 March 2018
- Preceded by: Manuel Rojas Molina
- Succeeded by: Dissolution of the District
- Constituency: 4th District (Antofagasta, Mejillones, Sierra Gorda and Taltal)

Ministry Regional Secretary of Antofagasta
- In office 19 April 2010 – 31 May 2013
- President: Sebastián Piñera
- Preceded by: Paula Baltra
- Succeeded by: Juan Pablo Arriagada

Personal details
- Born: Paulina Andrea Núñez Urrutia; 30 December 1982 (age 43) Santiago, Chile
- Party: National Renewal
- Spouse: Cristián Monckeberg (m. 2018)
- Children: 3
- Parent(s): Guillermo Núñez; Ernestina Urrutia
- Education: Catholic University of the North (LL.B); University of Salamanca (LL.M)
- Occupation: Politician
- Profession: Lawyer

Paulina Andrea Núñez Urrutia (born 30 December 1982) is a Chilean lawyer, academic and politician affiliated with the National Renewal (RN) party.

Since 2022, she has served as a member of the Senate of Chile, representing the Antofagasta Region. She previously sat in the Chamber of Deputies of Chile for two consecutive terms, from 2014 to 2022, during which she became noted for her work on transparency, probity and civic participation in public administration.

Born in Antofagasta, Núñez read law at the Catholic University of the North (UCN), where she later lectured on civil society and citizen participation. Prior to entering national politics, she served as Regional Ministerial Secretary ―Seremi― of Government for the Antofagasta Region during the first administration of President Sebastián Piñera, becoming one of the youngest regional officials in Chile at the time.

Within National Renewal, she has held several leadership positions, including vice-president and head of the party’s women’s wing. Over the course of her parliamentary career, she has sat on key legislative committees such as Constitution, Legislation, Justice and Rules; National Defence; and Environment and National Assets.

== Biography ==
=== Family ===
She was born in Antofagasta on 30 December 1982, the daughter of businessman Guillermo Abraham Núñez González and Ernestina Nelly Urrutia Celedón.

She married on 12 May 2018 the lawyer and politician Cristián Monckeberg, who served as a member of the Chamber of Deputies and as Minister of Labor and Social Provision; Minister of Social Development and Family; and Minister Secretary-General of the Presidency during the Second government of Sebastián Piñera. In April 2024, they became parents of Matilde, the senator’s first daughter.

=== Studies and professional career ===
She completed her primary and secondary education at the Instituto Santa María de Antofagasta. Later, she studied law at the Catholic University of the North (UCN), Antofagasta campus. Alongside her studies, from March 2004 to December 2005, she served as a teaching assistant in the Administrative Law course at the Faculty of Law of her university. Her undergraduate thesis was entitled: The declaration of interests and assets as instruments to guarantee the principle of administrative probity. She was sworn in as a lawyer on 21 August 2009.

After graduating, she joined the law firm Cariola, Diez, Pérez-Cotapos y Cía., where she remained until 2010.

From March 2012 to May 2013, she was a professor of the course "Civil Society and Citizen Participation" at the Faculty of Law of the UCN.

== Political career ==
During her university years, Núñez served as vice president of the Law Faculty Student Centre at the Catholic University of the North (UCN), where she studied law. At the same time, she joined the National Renewal (RN) party as a member of its youth branch, representing young members for two terms in the regional youth secretariat.

On 19 April 2010, she was appointed Regional Ministerial Secretary (seremi) of Government for the Antofagasta Region during the first administration of President Sebastián Piñera, becoming the youngest seremi in the government. She resigned on 31 May 2013 to launch her candidacy for the Chamber of Deputies, which was soon endorsed by her party.

In the 2013 parliamentary elections, she was elected deputy for District No. 4, serving the 2014–2018 legislative term. She sat on the Standing Committees on Mining and Energy, National Defence, and Extreme Zones and Chilean Antarctica. Re-elected in 2017 for the new District No. 3, she served until 2022 and chaired the Bicameral Group on Transparency and Probity of the National Congress. Throughout her tenure, she participated in several investigative committees and held internal leadership roles within RN, including vice-president and head of the party’s women’s branch.

In August 2021, Núñez registered her candidacy for the Senate of Chile under the «Chile Podemos Más» coalition, representing the Antofagasta Region for the 2022–2030 term. In the November 2021 elections, she was elected with 15,648 votes (8.36%). She took office on 11 March 2022 and joined the Standing Committee on Environment and National Assets, as well as the Special Committee on Women and gender equality.

Political offices
Preceded by Manuel José Ossandón	President of the Senate of Chile; 2026–present	Incumbent
