= Dignidad Ahora =

Dignity Now Dignidad Ahora
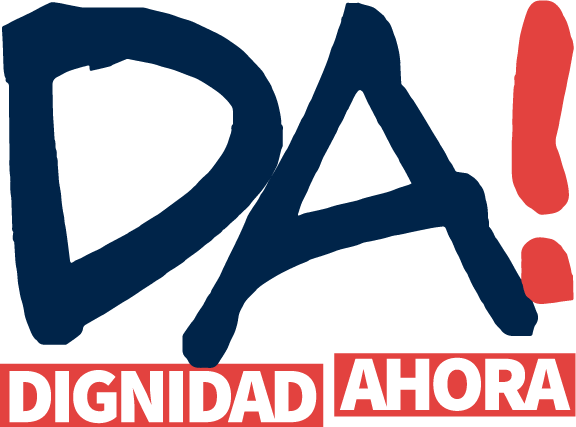
- Abbreviation: DA
- Leader: Pamela Jiles; Guillermo González
- Founded: 11 August 2020
- Dissolved: 3 February 2022
- Succeeded by: Popular Ecologist Left
- Headquarters: Santiago de Chile
- Ideology: Anti-capitalism; Anti-neoliberalism; Feminism; Multiculturalism
- Political position: Left-wing
- Coalition members: Humanist Party; Equality Party; Pirate Party
- Colours: Blue; Red
- Constitutional Convention: 1 / 155
- Chamber of Deputies: 3 / 155
- Senate: 0 / 43

Website
- dignidadahora.cl

Dignity Now (Spanish: Dignidad Ahora, DA) was a Chilean political coalition formally created on 11 August 2020 between the Humanist and Equality parties, to which various social and political organizations have joined.

== History ==
Dignidad Ahora was officially presented on 11 August 2020 through an act in the Plaza Baquedano in Santiago de Chile. In addition to the PH and the PI, the group was formed at the time of its foundation by the groups Acción Popular de Valparaíso, Victoria Popular, Maule Piensa, Fuerza Cultural, Pirate Party, Movimiento Democrático Popular and Poder Electoral Constituyente.

The coalition's first participation was in the 2021 municipal elections; the pact was registered on 6 January of that year. In these elections he won 3 mayorships and 55 councilors, one of the most emblematic cases being that of Italo Bravo (PI), who was elected as mayor of Pudahuel.

On 16 August 2021, the Humanist and Equality parties revalidated the Dignity Now coalition by registering it as an electoral pact for the November parliamentary elections.

== Composition ==
It is currently made up of the following parties:

Party	Abbr.	Leader
Humanist Party; Partido Humanista	PH	Pamela Jiles
Equality Party; Partido Igualdad	PI	Guillermo González Castro
Pirate Party of Chile; Partido Pirata de Chile	PP	Enrique Herrera Noya
