= San José de Maipo =

- City and Commune
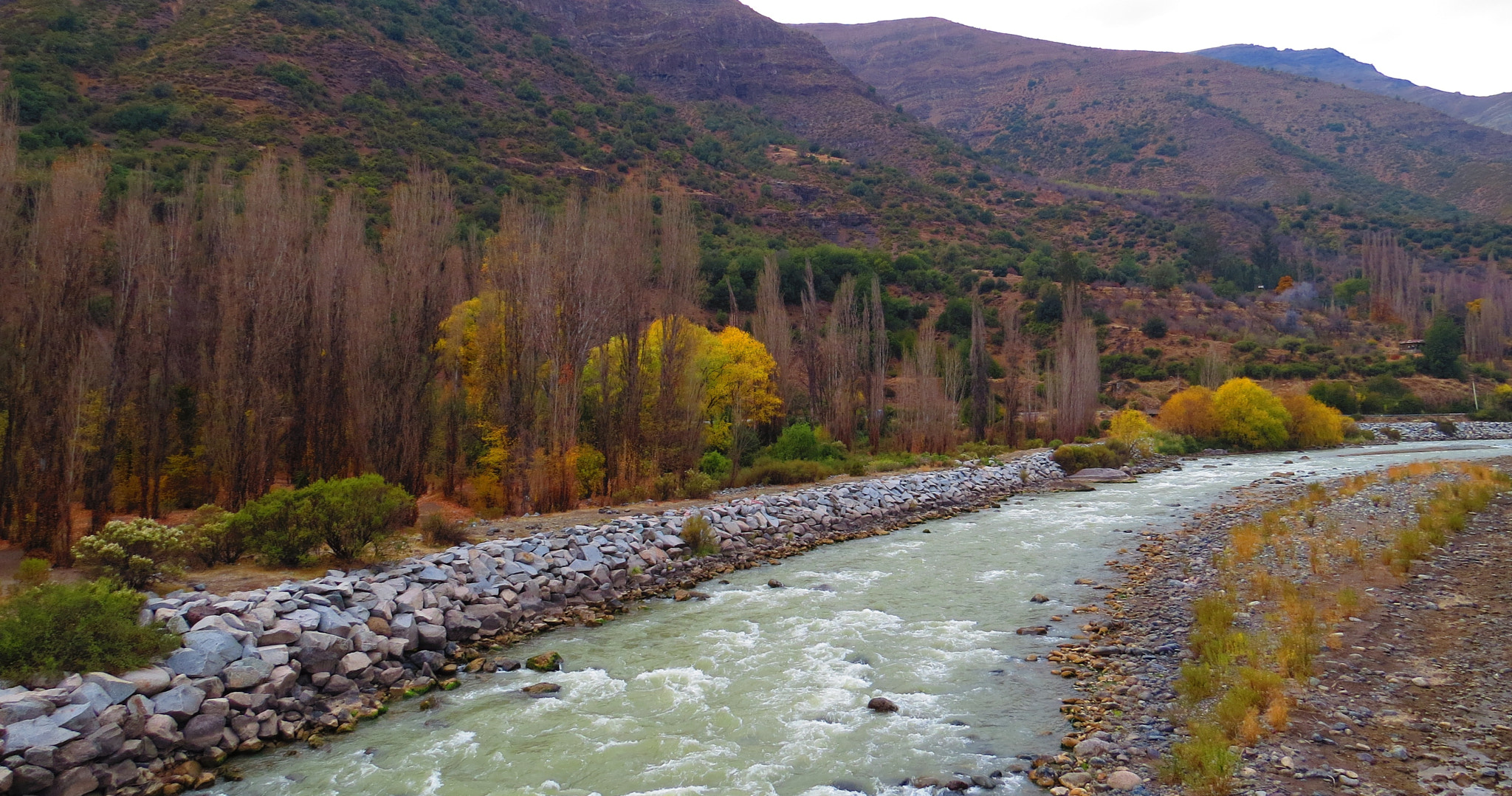
- Maipo River

- Coat of arms Location in Chile
- Coordinates: 33°38′24″S 70°21′11″W
- Country: Chile
- Region: Santiago Metro.
- Province: Cordillera

Government
  - Type: Municipality
  - Alcalde: Luis Pezoa Álvarez (RN)

Area
  - Total: 4,994.8 km^{2} (1,928.5 sq mi)
  - Rank: 1

Population (2002 Census)
  - Total: 13,376
  - Rank: 3
  - Density: 2.6780/km^{2} (6.9359/sq mi)
  - Urban: 9,311
  - Rural: 4,065

Sex
  - Men: 6,947
  - Women: 6,429
- Time zone: UTC-4 (CLT)
  - Summer (DST): UTC-3 (CLST)
- Area code: 56 + 53
- Website: Municipality of San José de Maipo

San José de Maipo is the name of a commune in Chile and the city within it, located in Cordillera Province, Santiago Metropolitan Region, some 48 kilometers south-east of capital Santiago, bordered on the east by Argentina which lies across the Andes.

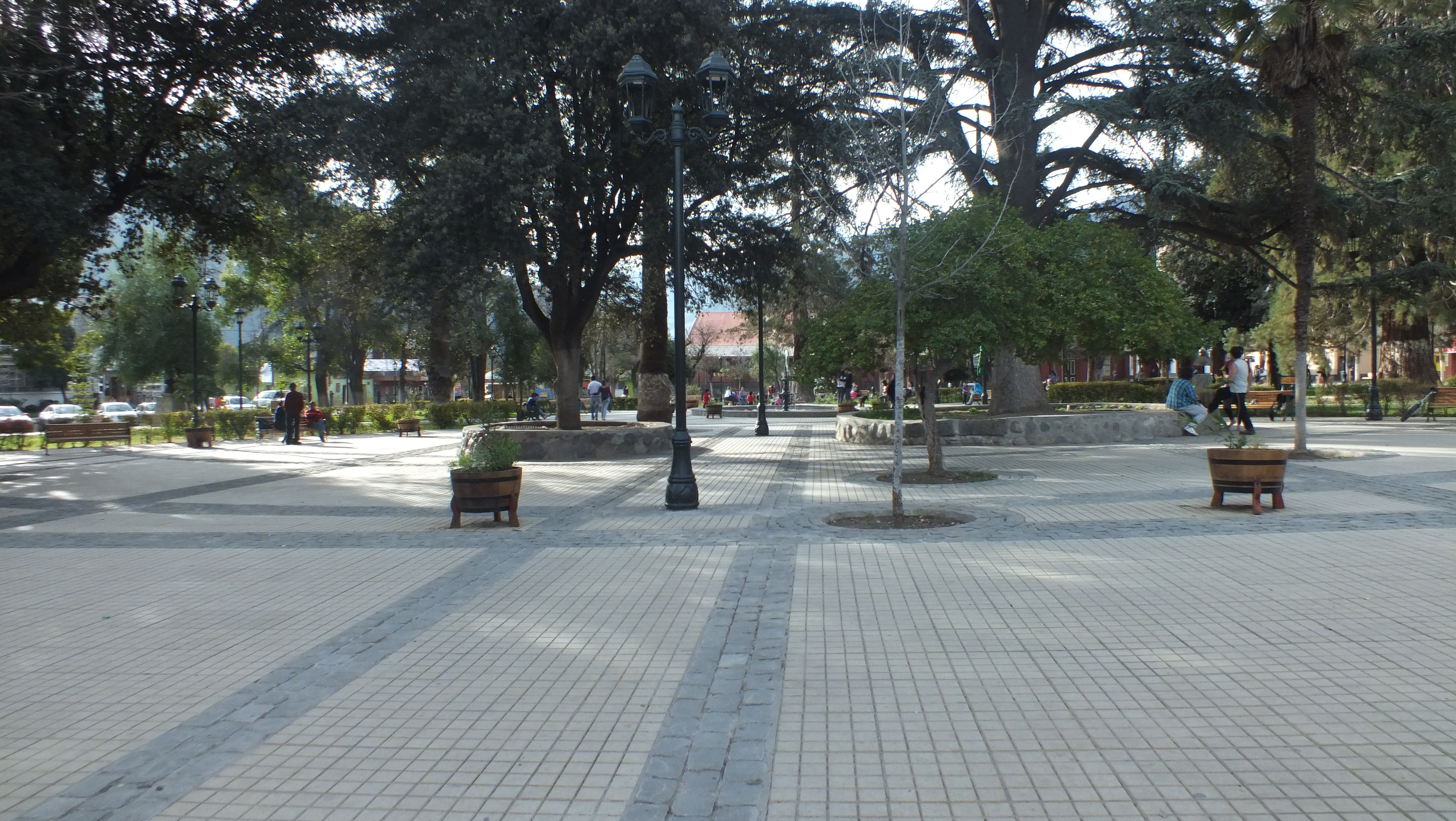
Plaza de San José de Maipo

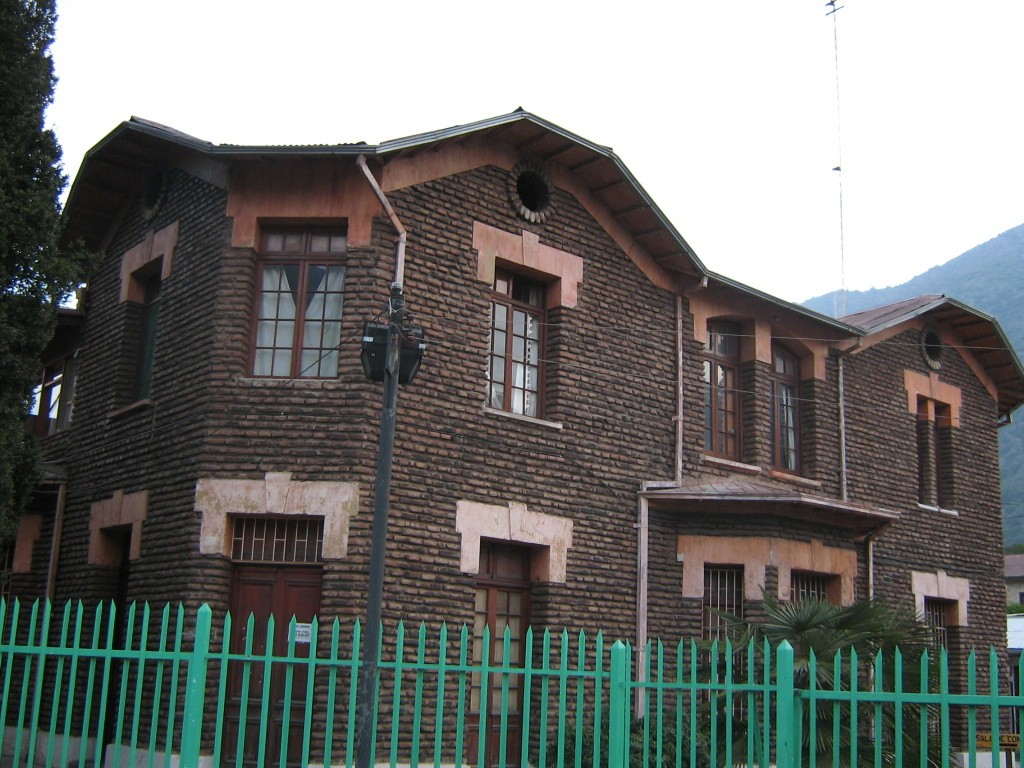
Town Hall

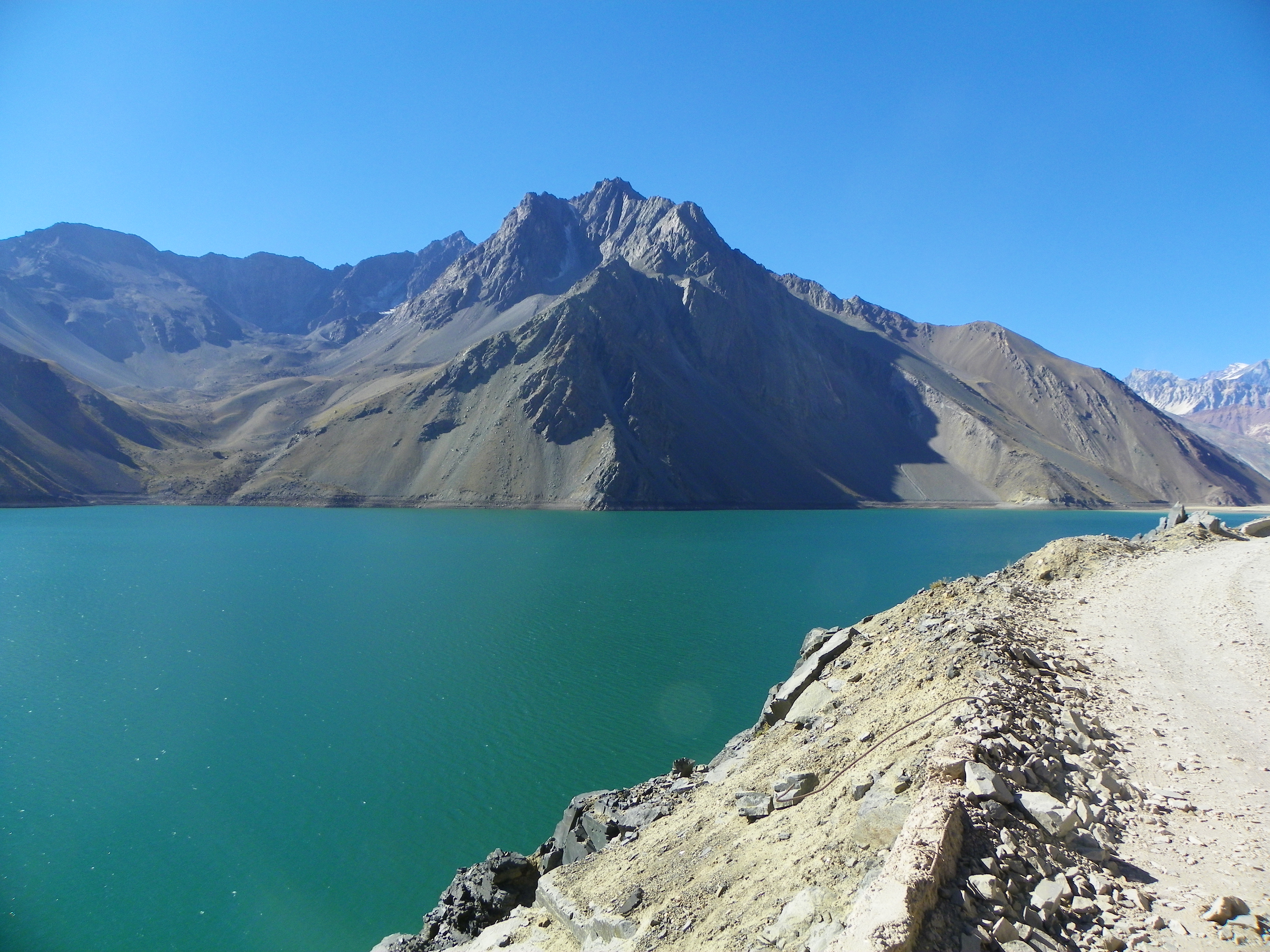
El Yeso Dam

== Demographics ==
According to the 2002 census of the National Statistics Institute, San José de Maipo spans an area of 4,994.8 km^{2} (1,929 sq mi) and has 13,376 inhabitants (6,947 men and 6,429 women). Of these, 9,311 (69.6%) lived in urban areas and 4,065 (30.4%) in rural areas. The population grew by 14.9% (1,730 persons) between the 1992 and 2002 censuses. Its population density was then 6.9/km^{2} (18/sq mi), making it the most sparsely populated commune in the region.

== Economy ==
Economic activities in the commune include nonmetallic mining, including stone quarries, production of almonds and stone fruits, and crafts based on laja rock and alabaster, among others. Regional tourism is very important to the area; there are a great number of food and lodging establishments. In 2001 the commune was declared Zona de Interés Turístico Nacional (ZOIT) by the National Service of Tourism (SERNATUR).

== History ==
San Jose de Maipo was named a town by order of Ambrosio O'Higgins in 1792. The Governor of Chile and future Viceroy of Peru considered it necessary to give it the power of a town to better support mining that took place around San Pedro Nolasco.

During the 19th century the area was the scene of several important events in the independence of Chile. Due to its proximity to Argentina it was used by General San Martin and the liberating Army of the Andes to support the Bernardine cause of O'Higgins.

At the end of the 19th century mining began in the area. During the 20th century, the commune became very important to the city of Santiago, since the first hydroelectric power station of the zone was constructed in Maitenes, as well as an aqueduct that supplies drinking water to the city from the Andean glaciers. The purity of the air in the area meant that sanatoriums were built for respiratory patients from all over Chile. Towards the end of the century ecotourism became a big part of regional development, partly due to the Maipo river's suitability for white water rafting.

== Administration ==
As a commune, San José de Maipo is a third-level administrative division of Chile administered by a municipal council headed by an alcalde who is directly elected every four years. During the four year period until 2024, the mayor was Roberto Ulises Pérez Catalán (PR), and the council members were:

- Franco Andrés Manzano Aranis (RN)
- Alejandro Antonio Hormazábal Arteaga (RN)
- Mario Fernando Fernández Romero (Ind/PR)
- Diego Roberto Trincado Herrera (Ind/FA)
- Carmen Gloria Iracabal Kneer (PS)
- Luis Vargas Sandoval (PS)

Within the electoral divisions of Chile, San José de Maipo is represented in the Chamber of Deputies by Osvaldo Andrade (PS) and Leopoldo Pérez (RN) as part of the 29th electoral district, (together with Puente Alto, Pirque and La Pintana). The commune is represented in the Senate by Soledad Alvear (PDC) and Pablo Longueira (UDI) as part of the 8th senatorial constituency (Santiago-East).

== Climate ==
Climate data for San José de Maipo, elevation 1,060 m (3,480 ft)
Month	Jan	Feb	Mar	Apr	May	Jun	Jul	Aug	Sep	Oct	Nov	Dec	Year
Mean daily maximum °C (°F)	27.8 (82.0)	27.1 (80.8)	25.3 (77.5)	22.3 (72.1)	18.2 (64.8)	15.5 (59.9)	15.5 (59.9)	16.0 (60.8)	18.5 (65.3)	20.6 (69.1)	23.8 (74.8)	27.0 (80.6)	21.5 (70.6)
Daily mean °C (°F)	18.9 (66.0)	17.8 (64.0)	15.7 (60.3)	12.9 (55.2)	10.4 (50.7)	7.8 (46.0)	7.7 (45.9)	7.9 (46.2)	10.2 (50.4)	12.6 (54.7)	15.3 (59.5)	18.1 (64.6)	12.9 (55.3)
Mean daily minimum °C (°F)	10.6 (51.1)	10.2 (50.4)	8.3 (46.9)	6.1 (43.0)	4.9 (40.8)	2.5 (36.5)	2.4 (36.3)	2.4 (36.3)	4.1 (39.4)	5.6 (42.1)	7.4 (45.3)	9.4 (48.9)	6.2 (43.1)
Average precipitation mm (inches)	4.9 (0.19)	6.0 (0.24)	6.7 (0.26)	25.7 (1.01)	132.9 (5.23)	139.8 (5.50)	114.4 (4.50)	99.9 (3.93)	48.4 (1.91)	27.4 (1.08)	12.1 (0.48)	5.0 (0.20)	623.2 (24.53)
Average relative humidity (%)	55	59	58	56	63	63	62	65	64	62	56	52	60
Source: Bioclimatografia de Chile
