= Pamela Jiles (politician) =

Chilean journalist, writer, and politician

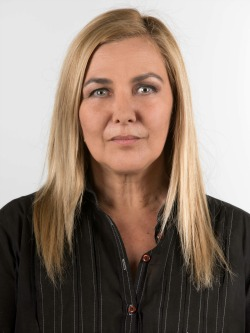
- Official portrait, 2018

Member of the Chamber of Deputies of Chile
- Incumbent
- Assumed office 11 March 2018
- Preceded by: District established
- Constituency: District 12

Personal details
- Born: 30 November 1960 (age 65) Santiago de Chile, Chile
- Party: PDG (since 2025)
- Other political affiliations: PCCh (until 2006); PH (2016–2022); Independent (2022–2025)
- Spouse(s): Gastón Muñoz (m. 1987; div. 1999) Pablo Maltés (m. 2011)
- Children: 4
- Relatives: Elena Caffarena (grandmother); Ricardo Izurieta (uncle)
- Education: Pontifical Catholic University of Chile
- Occupation: Journalist, writer, politician

Pamela Jiles Moreno (Note: In this Spanish name, the first or paternal surname is Jiles and the second or maternal family name is Moreno.) (born 30 November 1960) is a Chilean journalist, writer, and politician serving as a member of the Chamber of Deputies for District 12 since 2018. A prominent and often controversial figure, she first gained fame as a television journalist and commentator before entering politics. Jiles is known for her populist style and was a leading proponent of legislation allowing citizens to withdraw funds from their private pensions during the COVID-19 pandemic.

== Early life and education ==
Pamela Jiles was born in Santiago to engineer Juan Félix Jiles Caffarena and María Inés Moreno Calderara. Her father was the son of noted feminist activist Elena Caffarena, whom Jiles has cited as a major political influence. She attended the Instituto Santa María in Ñuñoa and the Liceo Experimental Manuel de Salas.

Her family background is marked by notable figures: she is a second niece of former Chilean Army Commander-in-Chief Ricardo Izurieta Caffarena and a great-granddaughter of Blas Caffarena Chiozza, founder of the Caffarena textile company. Jiles has stated that she was kidnapped and abused during the Pinochet dictatorship, an experience that shaped her political outlook.

She studied journalism at the Pontifical Catholic University of Chile.

== Journalism career ==
Jiles began her career in the 1980s working for opposition magazines such as Solidaridad, Apsi, and Análisis during the Pinochet era. In the 1990s, she joined the state broadcaster Televisión Nacional de Chile (TVN), working on programs including the investigative show Informe Especial, Mujeres al borde de..., and Siempre Lunes. She was dismissed from TVN in 2001 by executive director Pablo Piñera, reportedly due to her views on Pinochet's legacy.

She later transitioned into entertainment television, becoming a celebrity commentator, or "opinólogo," on shows like Vértigo (Canal 13). From 2006 to 2008, she was a panelist on Sálvese Quien Pueda (Chilevisión). She further developed her public persona on programs like Intrusos (La Red, 2012–2015) and Primer plano (Chilevisión, 2015–2017). It was during this time that the nickname "Abuela" (Grandma), popularized by a television comedian, became widely associated with her, and she began referring to her supporters as her "nietitos" (grandchildren).

== Political career ==
=== Early involvement and presidential bid ===
Jiles was initially a member of the Communist Party of Chile but left in 2006. In the 2005 presidential election, she appeared in an advertisement for Juntos Podemos Más candidate Tomás Hirsch.

In 2009, she launched a satirical-yet-serious presidential pre-candidacy promoted by the magazine The Clinic under the slogan "Somos millones los Jiles" (a pun, as the similar-sounding giles means "idiots"). She later abandoned this bid and instead ran unsuccessfully for a deputy seat in the 2009 parliamentary election on the list of Alejandro Navarro.

=== Member of Parliament (2018–present) ===
Jiles joined the Humanist Party in 2016. In the 2017 parliamentary election, she was elected to the Chamber of Deputies for District 12 as part of the Broad Front coalition.

Her national profile rose significantly during the COVID-19 pandemic when she championed laws that allowed citizens to make multiple withdrawals from their private pension funds (AFP), a highly popular move. Her celebration of the first bill's approval, running through congress with her arms behind her in a style reminiscent of the anime Naruto, became a viral moment.

She was re-elected by a landslide in the 2021 parliamentary election, becoming the top vote-getter in her district. Following the dissolution of the Humanist Party in 2022 for failing to meet electoral thresholds, she distanced herself from it. In a significant political shift, she joined the center-right Partido de la Gente (PDG) in August 2025.

== Political profile and public image ==
Jiles is widely described as a populist, with her political style often compared to that of Donald Trump. She is known for her confrontational rhetoric and a significant social media presence. While her advocacy for pension withdrawals garnered massive public support, it was criticized by economists and political opponents for potentially undermining the pension system.

Her political consistency has been questioned due to her voting record, which has sometimes aligned with right-wing parties, and her eventual move to the PDG, despite previous statements distancing herself from its founder, Franco Parisi. She has positioned herself in opposition to the government of President Gabriel Boric, whom she publicly mocked during his primary campaign.

== Personal life ==
Jiles was first married to Gastón Muñoz in 1987; they had two children before divorcing in 1999. She is now married to politician Pablo Maltés (since 2011), with whom she has adopted two children from Chile's national children's service, Sename. Protecting vulnerable children in state care is a stated priority of her political work.

== Published works ==
- Crimen bajo Estado de sitio (with María Olivia Mönckeberg and María Eugenia Camus), 1986.
- Poesías sexuales, 2004.
- Fantasías sexuales de mujeres chilenas, 2004.
- Confesiones sexuales de hombres chilenos, Editorial Grijalbo.
- Maldita farándula, Editorial Catalonia, 2007.

== Electoral history ==
Year	Election	District	Pact	Party	Votes	%	Result
2009	Parliamentary (Deputy)	District 45	Chile Limpio. Vote Feliz	Ind.-MAS	11,185	9.85	Not elected
2017	Parliamentary (Deputy)	District 12	Broad Front	PH	45,222	12.96	Elected
2021	Parliamentary (Deputy)	District 12	Dignidad Ahora	PH	77,593	19.79	Elected
