= La Pintana =

- Commune
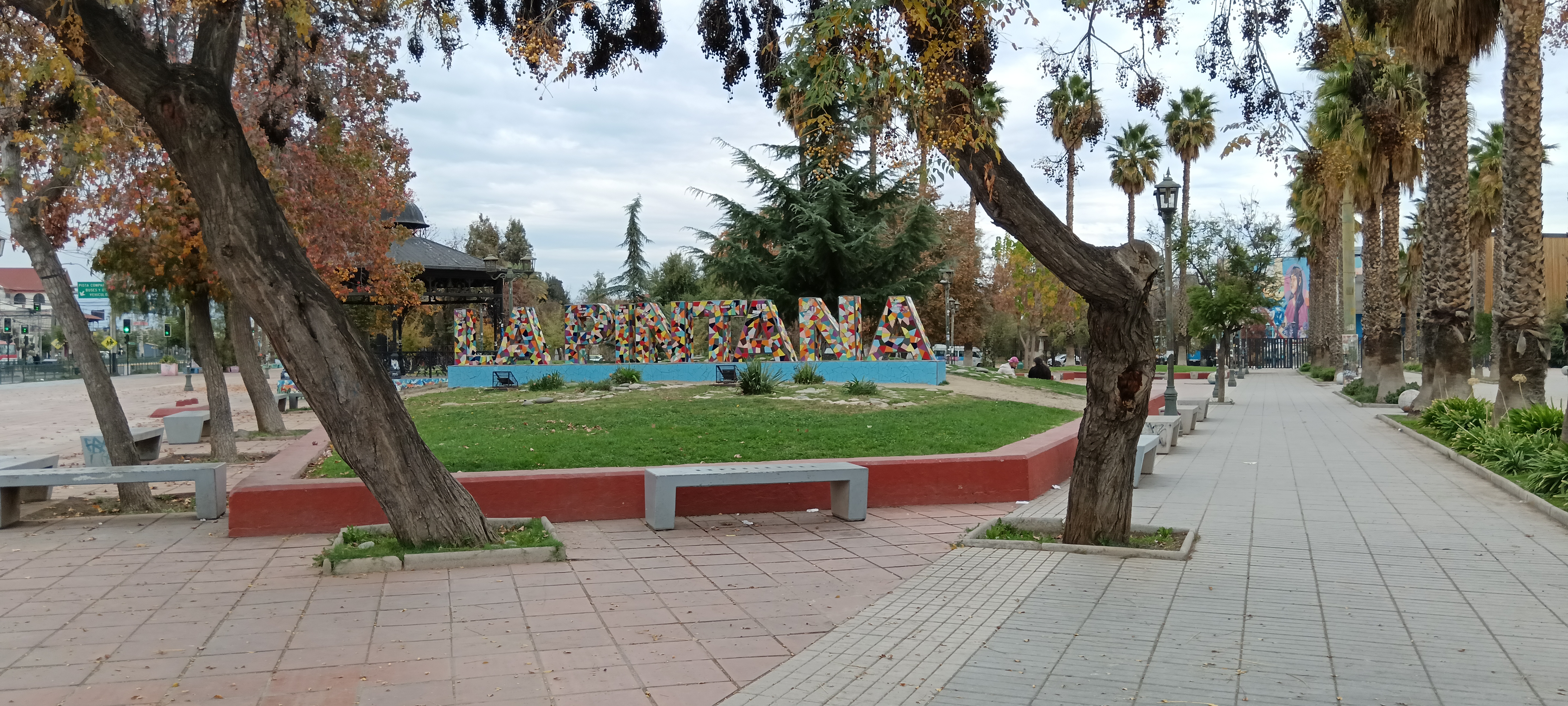
- La Pintana Square

- Flag Coat of arms Map of La Pintana commune within Greater Santiago Location in Chile
- Coordinates: 33°35′S 70°38′W
- Country: Chile
- Region: Santiago Metropolitan Region
- Province: Santiago
- Established: 22 November 1984

Government
  - Type: Municipality
  - Alcalde: Claudia Pizarro Peña (DC)

Area
  - Total: 30.6 km^{2} (11.8 sq mi)

Population (2024)
  - Total: 175,421
  - Density: 5,730/km^{2} (14,800/sq mi)
  - Urban: 175,421
  - Rural: 0
- Time zone: UTC-4 (CLT)
  - Summer (DST): UTC-3 (CLST)
- Area code: 56 +
- Website: Municipality of La Pintana

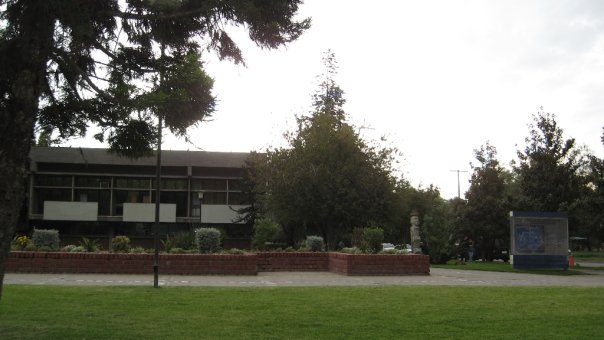
Campus Antumapu Universidad de Chile.

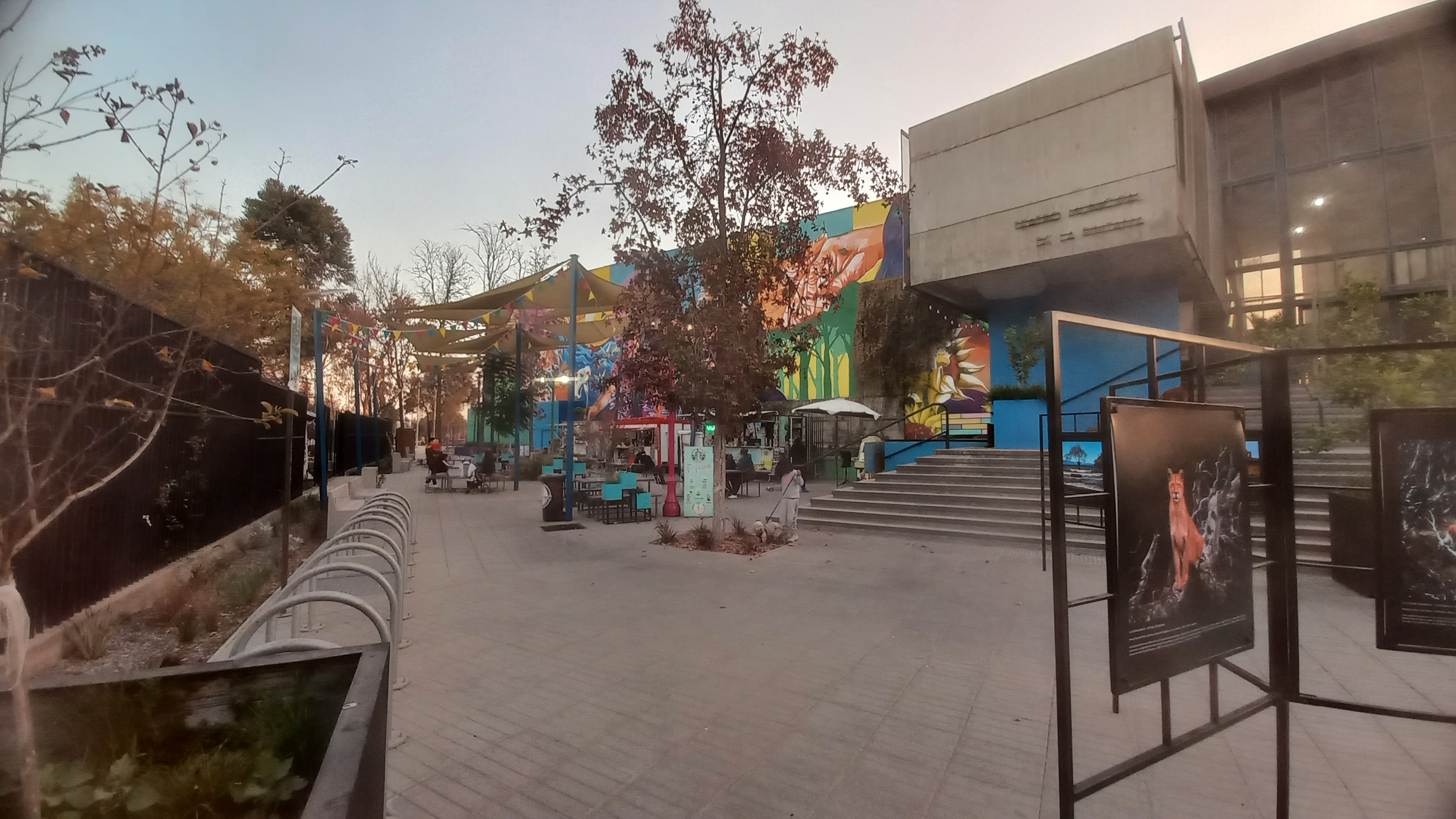
Municipality Theatre

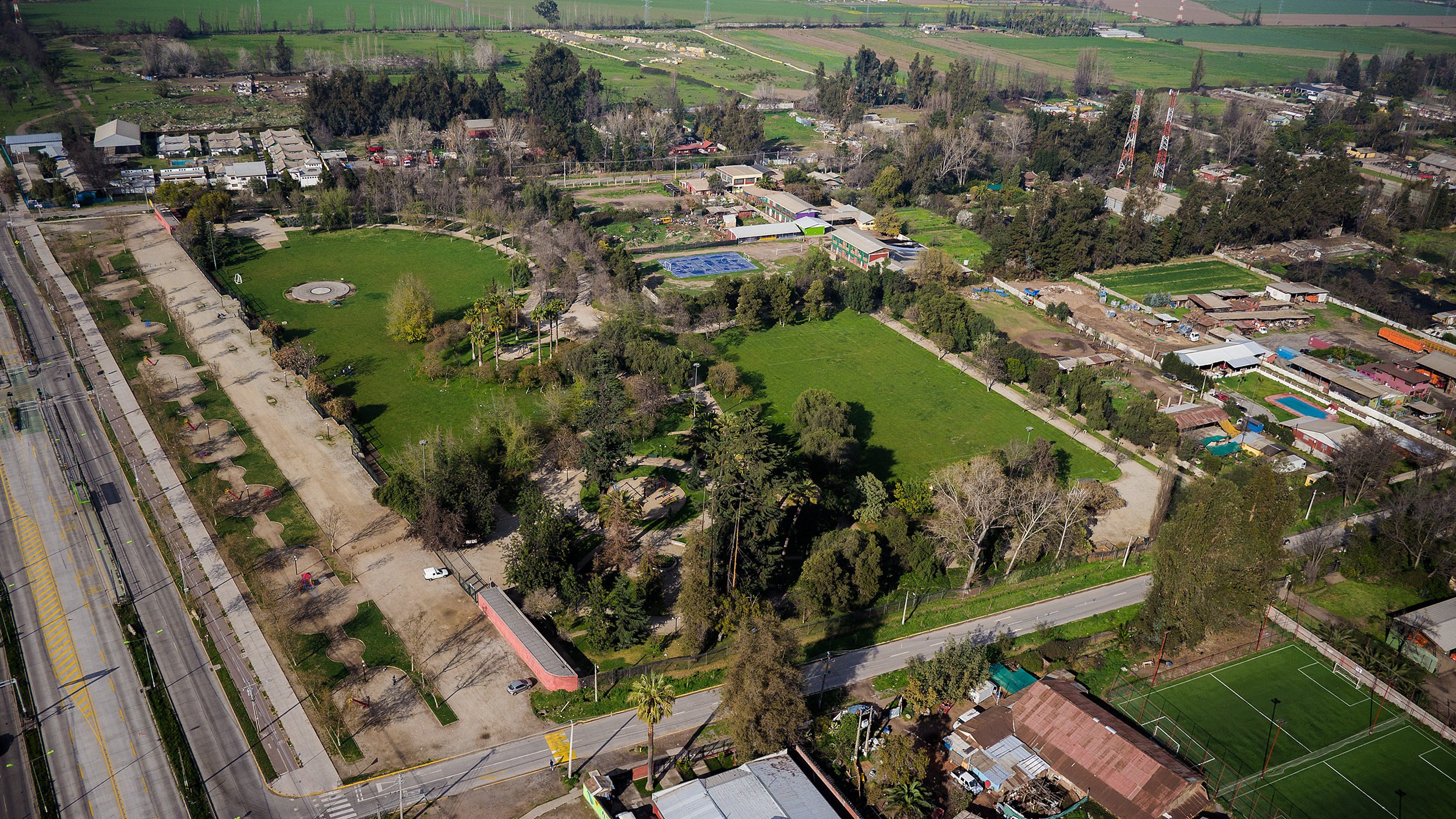
Mapuhue Park

La Pintana is a commune in the Santiago Province in the Santiago Metropolitan Region in Chile. La Pintana is home to Antumapu, the agricultural and veterinary sciences campus of University of Chile, Chile's oldest university. It has 175,421 inhabitants.

== Administration ==
As a commune, La Pintana is a third-level administrative division of Chile administered by a municipal council, headed by an alcalde who is directly elected every four years. The 2024-2028 alcalde is Claudia Pizarro Peña (DC). The communal council has the following members:

- Isaac Núñez Sepúlveda (REP)
- Sara Guerrero Martínez (RN)
- Marcela Poveda Morales (DC)
- René Díaz Jorquera (PR)
- Iván López Bilbao (PS)
- Stephany Hurtado Panes (PAVP)
- Roberto Jaramillo Carreño (PH)
- Waleska Salas Núñez (PC)

Within the electoral divisions of Chile, La Pintana is represented in the Chamber of Deputies by Osvaldo Andrade (PS) and Leopoldo Pérez (RN) as part of the 29th electoral district, (together with Puente Alto, Pirque and San José de Maipo). The commune is represented in the Senate by Soledad Alvear (PDC) and Pablo Longueira (UDI) as part of the 8th senatorial constituency (Santiago-East).

== Demographics ==
As of the 2024 census, the population is 175,421, of which 48.6% are males, and 51.4% are females. People under 15 years old make up 20.4% of the population, and people over 65 years old make up 12.7%. 100% of the population is urban.

Historical population
Year	Pop.	±% p.a.
1970	37,994	—
1982	73,932	+5.70%
1992	169,640	+8.66%
2002	189,278	+1.10%
2017	177,335	−0.43%
2024	175,421	−0.15%
Source: INE, Memoria Chilena

- Average annual household income: US$23,576 (PPP, 2006)
- Population below poverty line: 17.2% (2006)
- Regional quality of life index: 73.29, medium, 30 out of 52 (2005)
- Human Development Index: 0.679, 171 out of 341 (2003)

=== Ethnic minorities ===
As of the 2024 census, Indigenous peoples make up 13.9% of the population, and Afro-Chileans make up 1.0%.

=== Religion ===
As of the 2024 census, 67.4% of the population over 15 years old are Christians (39.5% Catholics, 25.6% Evangelicals or Protestants, and 2.4% other branches), 0.1% are Jews, 0.1% are Muslims, 0.04% are Buddhists, 0.01% are Hinduists, 0.7% are adrehents of other religions, and 31.6% are irreligious.

=== Immigration ===
As of the 2024 census, immigrants make up 4.7% of the population - 3.9% are from South America, 0.8% from North America, 0.02% from Europe, 0.03% from Asia, 0.002% from Africa, and 0.001% from Oceania.

== See also ==
- Bajos de Mena
