= Pirque =

- City and Commune
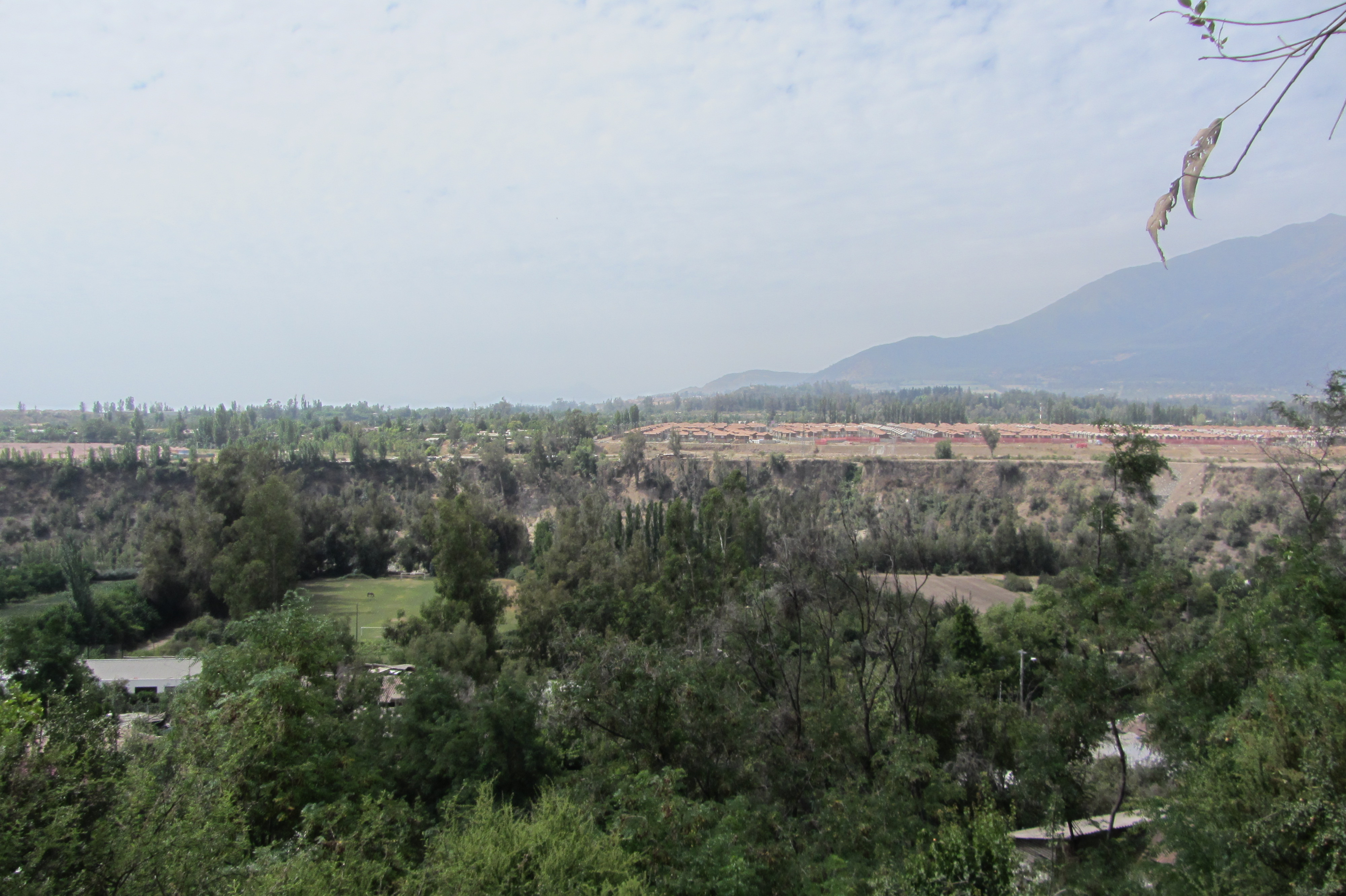
- panoramic view

- Coat of arms Location in Chile
- Coordinates (city): 33°38′S 70°33′W
- Country: Chile
- Region: Santiago Metro.
- Province: Cordillera

Government
  - Type: Municipality
  - Alcalde: Jaime Escudero Ramos (Ind.)

Area
  - Total: 445.3 km^{2} (171.9 sq mi)

Population (2002 Census)
  - Total: 16,565
  - Density: 37.20/km^{2} (96.35/sq mi)
  - Urban: 9,651
  - Rural: 6,914

Sex
  - Men: 8,384
  - Women: 8,181
- Time zone: UTC-4 (CLT)
  - Summer (DST): UTC-3 (CLST)
- Area code: 56 +
- Website: Municipality of Pirque

Pirque (Spanish: [ˈpiɾke]) is a commune of Chile in Cordillera Province, Santiago Metropolitan Region; it is located 2.8 kilometers southeast of Puente Alto and 21.3 kilometers south-southeast of the center of Santiago. It is situated at the base of the Cajón del Maipo, and is the home of the Concha y Toro wine company.

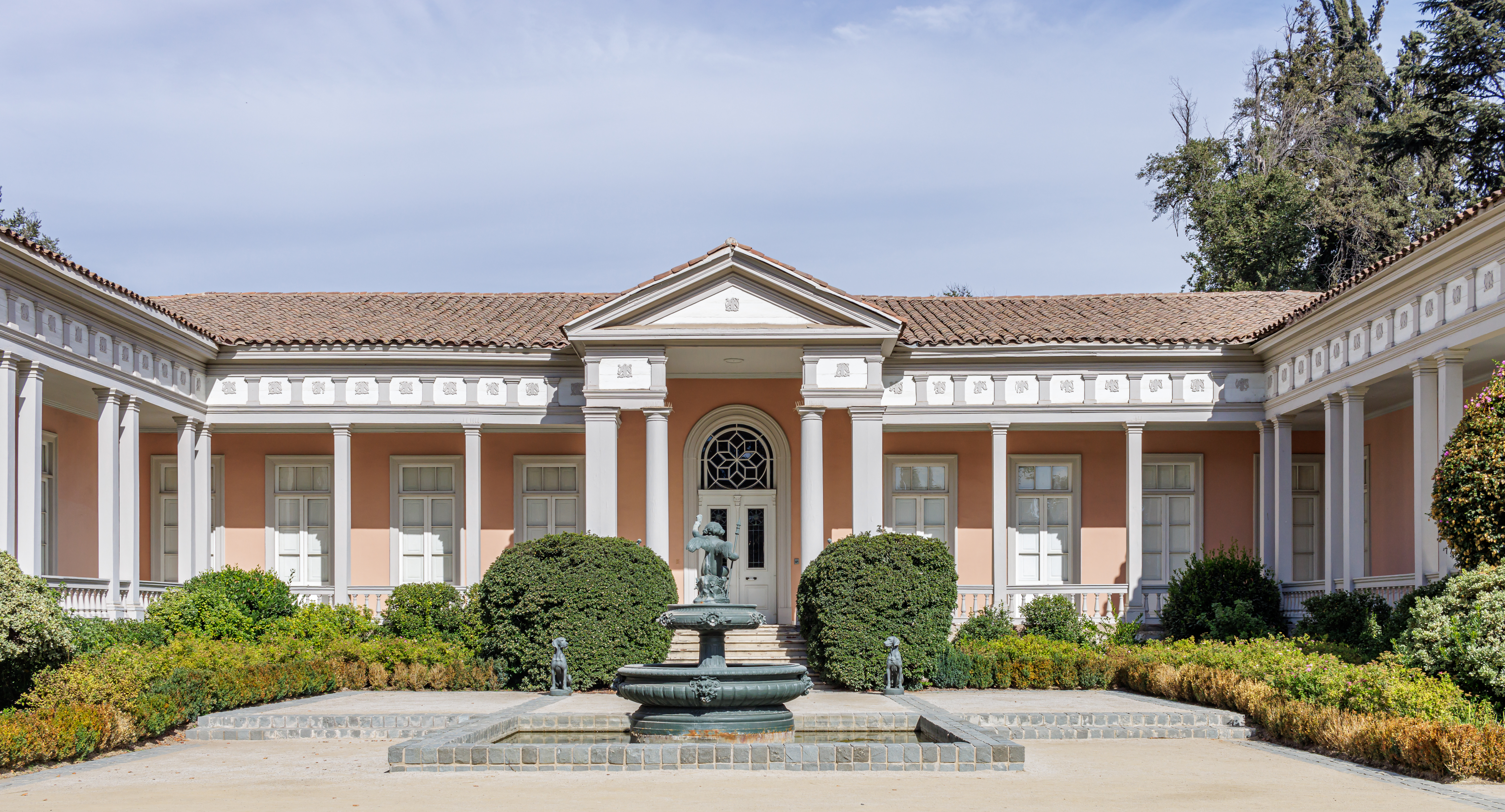
Casa Patronal Concha y Toro

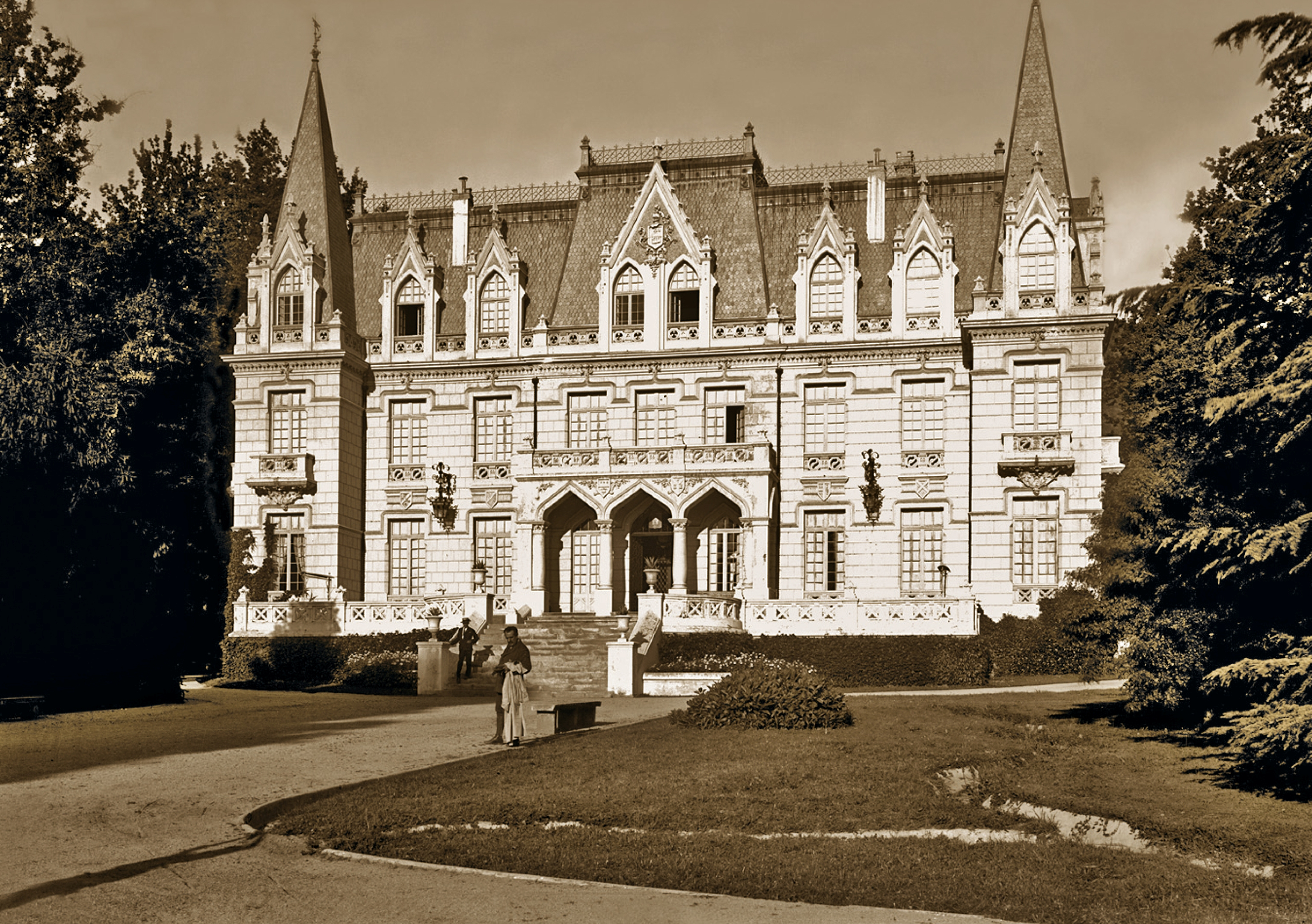
Las Majadas Palace

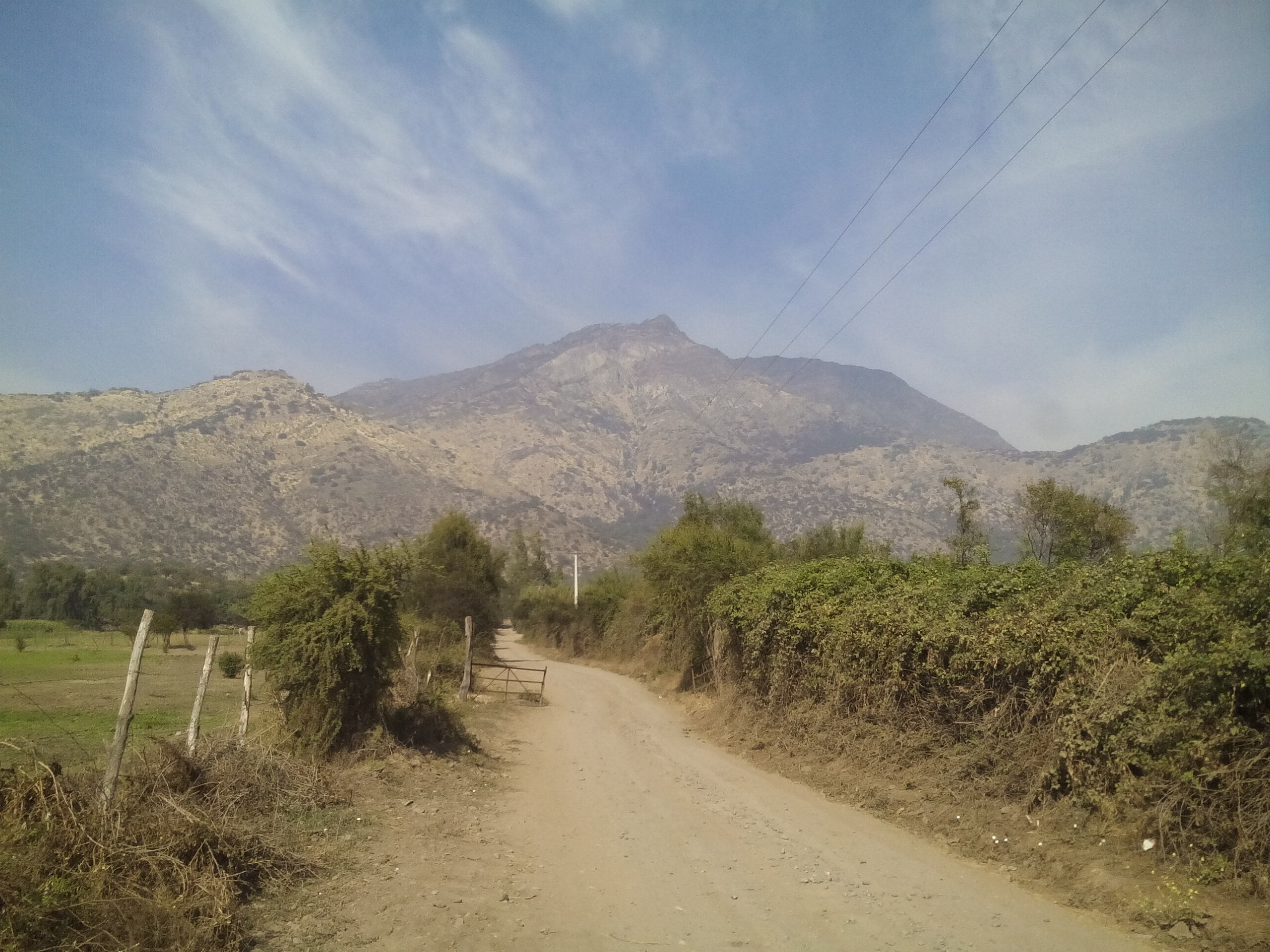
Rural road

== Demographics ==
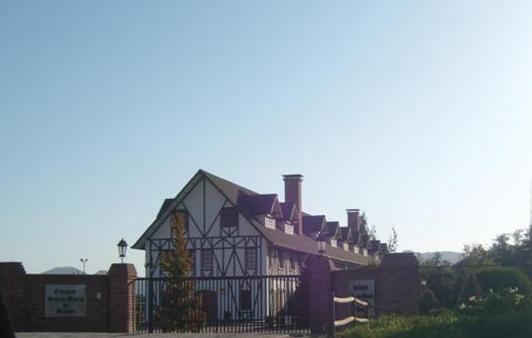
Almenar de Pirque High School

According to the 2002 census of the National Statistics Institute, Pirque spans an area of 445.3 km^{2} (172 sq mi) and has 16,565 inhabitants (8,384 men and 8,181 women). Of these, 9,651 (58.3%) lived in urban areas and 6,914 (41.7%) in rural areas. The population grew by 45.7% (5,197 persons) between the 1992 and 2002 censuses.

=== Statistics ===
- Population: 20,518 (2006 projection)
- Average annual household income: US$21,537 (PPP, 2006)
- Population below poverty line: 9.1% (2006)

== Administration ==
As a commune, Pirque is a third-level administrative division of Chile administered by a municipal council, headed by an alcalde who is directly elected every four years. The 2024-2028 alcalde is Jaime Escudero Ramos (Ind). The communal council has the following members:

- Sergio Ulloa Galdames (PCCh)
- Betzabe Muñoz Herrera (PR)
- Claudio Arredondo Medina (PPD)
- Luis Batalle Pedreros (PS)
- Leopoldo Pérez Lahsen (RN)
- Viviana Petric Meneses (REP)

Within the electoral divisions of Chile, Pirque is represented in the Chamber of Deputies by Mr. Osvaldo Andrade (PS) and Mr. Leopoldo Pérez (RN) as part of the 29th electoral district, (together with Puente Alto, San José de Maipo and La Pintana). The commune is represented in the Senate by Soledad Alvear Valenzuela (PDC) and Ena Von Baer (UDI) as part of the 8th senatorial constituency (Santiago-East).
