= Jeannette Jara =

Chilean politician and lawyer (b.1974)

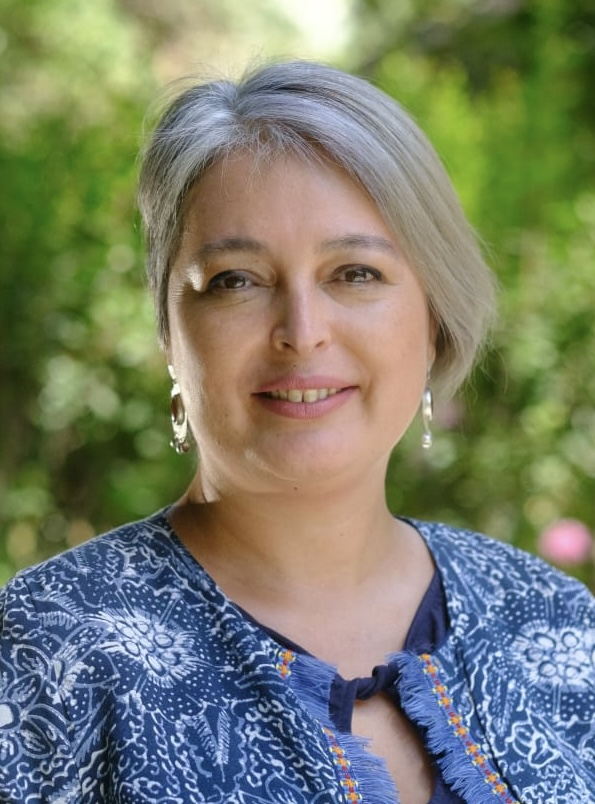
- Official portrait, 2022

Minister of Labor and Social Provision
- In office 11 March 2022 – 7 April 2025
- President: Gabriel Boric
- Preceded by: Patricio Melero
- Succeeded by: Giorgio Boccardo

Undersecretary of Social Provision
- In office 10 November 2016 – 11 March 2018
- President: Michelle Bachelet
- Preceded by: Julia Urquieta
- Succeeded by: María José Zaldívar

President of the University of Santiago de Chile Students Federation
- In office 1997–1998
- Preceded by: Magdalena Alid
- Succeeded by: Marcos Barraza

Personal details
- Born: Jeannette Alejandra Jara Román; 23 April 1974 (age 52) Independencia, Chile
- Party: Communist (1989−present)
- Spouse(s): Gonzalo Garrido Rojas (m. 1993; died 1996) Víctor Manuel Gajardo Aguilera (m. 2013; div. 2021)
- Domestic partner: Claudio Rodríguez
- Children: 1
- Education: University of Santiago, Chile (Degree) (MPA); Central University of Chile (LL.B.)
- Occupation: Public Administrator • Lawyer • Politician

Jeannette Alejandra Jara Román (born 23 April 1974) is a Chilean lawyer, public administrator, and politician. A member of the Communist Party of Chile (PCCh), she served as Minister of Labor and Social Provision under President Gabriel Boric from 2022 to 2025. She previously served as Undersecretary of Social Provision during Michelle Bachelet's second administration (2016–2018).

During her tenure as Labor Minister, Jara oversaw changes, including a reduction of the working week from 45 to 40 hours and increases to the minimum wage. In June 2025, she won the governing coalition's presidential primary, becoming its nominee for the 2025 general election. In the first round of voting on 16 November 2025, she secured a plurality and advanced to a runoff against José Antonio Kast; she was defeated in the December runoff, gaining 41.8% of the vote and failing to a win a majority in any of Chile's regions.

== Early life and education ==
Jeannette Jara was born on 23 April 1974 in Conchalí, a working-class commune in northern Santiago (now part of Independencia). She grew up in the El Cortijo neighborhood, raised primarily by her grandmother in a mediagua (a prefabricated shelter) that initially lacked running water. Her father, Sergio Elías Jara Ulloa, was an industrial mechanic, and her mother, Jeanette del Carmen Román Guzmán, was a homemaker. She is the eldest of five siblings, including the investigative journalist Sergio Jara Román.

Jara attended the Liceo Isaura Dinator de Guzmán, a public high school in Santiago. To support her studies and family, she worked various jobs in her youth, including as a promotora (promoter),^{a} seasonal agricultural worker, and street food vendor.

She initially enrolled in law at the Pontifical Catholic University of Chile but transferred to the University of Santiago, Chile (USACH) due to financial constraints and political affinity, graduating with a degree in Public administration. She later obtained a Bachelor of Laws (LL.B.) from the Central University of Chile and a master's degree in Public Management from USACH.

== Career ==
=== Student and union activism ===
Jara joined the Communist Youth of Chile (JJCC) in 1989 at age 14, during the transition to democracy. In 1997, she was elected president of the Student Federation of the University of Santiago (FEUSACH), defeating a rival slate from the Socialist Party of Chile. That same year, she helped coordinate a tribute to Che Guevara at the Estadio Nacional Julio Martínez Prádanos, attended by 60,000 people.

During a 1997 student protest, she was arrested and accused of assaulting a police officer, which she denied. She was briefly detained at the San Joaquín Women's Prison, an event that caused friction between the Communist Party and the governing Concertación coalition.

After graduating, Jara joined the Internal Revenue Service (SII) as a fiscal auditor. She became active in the Association of Internal Revenue Service Inspectors (AFIICH), serving as a national leader and union representative for over a decade.

=== Bachelet administration (2014–2018) ===
During the second administration of Michelle Bachelet, the Communist Party joined the ruling New Majority coalition. Jara served as chief of staff to the Undersecretary of Social Provision, Julia Urquieta, and later as an advisor in the Ministry of Social Development and Family.

In October 2016, President Bachelet appointed her Undersecretary of Social Provision, a post she held until the end of the administration in March 2018. After leaving government, she taught at the Academy of

Christian Humanism University and worked as a municipal administrator for the Commune of Santiago under Mayor Irací Hassler. In 2021, she ran for mayor of Conchalí but was not elected.

=== Minister of Labor (2022–2025) ===
On 21 January 2022, President-elect Gabriel Boric appointed Jara as Minister of Labor and Social Provision. She assumed office on 11 March 2022, becoming the first Communist to hold the portfolio.

Jara became a central figure in the Boric cabinet, known for her negotiating ability with both business guilds and trade unions. She enacted "40 Hours Law" (Ley de 40 Horas), enacted in April 2023, which mandated a gradual reduction of the standard working week from 45 to 40 hours over five years. She also secured legislative approval for a hike in the minimum wage to 500,000 CLP and the "Karin Law" aimed at preventing workplace harassment.

Jara resigned from the cabinet on 7 April 2025 to pursue a presidential bid, handing over the ministry to Giorgio Boccardo.

=== 2025 presidential campaign ===
Jara was nominated by the Communist Party in early 2025. On 29 June 2025, she won the primary of the ruling coalition (Unity for Chile), defeating Carolina Tohá (PPD), Gonzalo Winter (FA), and Jaime Mulet (FRVS). She became the second Communist woman to run for the presidency, following Gladys Marín in 1999.

Her campaign platform emphasized a living wage of 750,000 CLP, the creation of a National Employment Agency, and the establishment of a National Care System. In the general election held on 16 November 2025, Jara received 27% of the vote, securing a plurality and advancing to a December runoff against the right-wing candidate José Antonio Kast. Jara lost the runoff after gaining only 41.8% of the vote; despite winning several communes, Jara failed to win a majority vote in any of Chile's regions.

== Personal life ==
Jara married Gonzalo Garrido Rojas, a fellow student leader and member of the JJCC, in 1993. Garrido died by suicide in 1996; Jara has remained close to his family and often commemorates him publicly. She later married Víctor Gajardo Aguilera, with whom she has one son; the couple divorced in 2021. As of 2025, she is in a relationship with Claudio Rodríguez, a social worker.

== Notes ==
a.A promotora is a sales promoter, typically hired to demonstrate products or distribute samples in retail environments.
