= Bárbara Figueroa =

Chilean politician

Barbara Figueroa
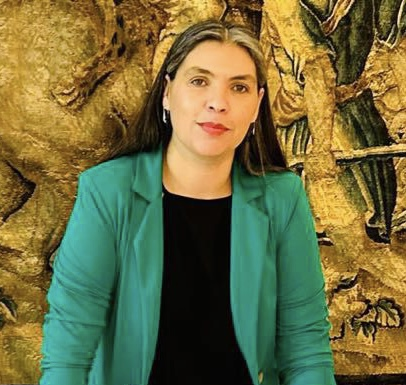

Ambassador of Chile to Argentina
- In office 31 March 2022 – 2023
- President: Gabriel Boric
- Preceded by: Nicolás Monckeberg
- Succeeded by: José Antonio Viera-Gallo

Personal details
- Born: 13 April 1979 (age 47) Santiago, Chile
- Party: Communist Party of Chile
- Spouse: Hernán González
- Children: 1
- Parent(s): Jose Figueroa Jorquera; Salome Sandoval
- Education: Academy of Christian Humanism University (Psychology); Metropolitan University of Educational Sciences (Philosophy)
- Occupation: Trade unionist, teacher and politician.
- Website: http://barbarafigueroa.cl/

Bárbara Catherine Figueroa Sandoval (born in Santiago, 13 April 1979) is a Chilean psychologist, philosophy professor, trade unionist and politician. Since 2023, she has been appointed as a general secretary of the Communist Party of Chile (PCCh).

She served as president of the Workers' United Center of Chile (CUT) from 2012 to 2021 and previously was national leader of the College of Teachers of Chile. From 31 March 2022 to 24 September 2023, she served as her country's ambassador to Argentina, under the government of President Gabriel Boric.

== History ==
She was born in Santiago as the daughter of Salomé Sandoval and José Figueroa Jorquera. They were known to be union leaders and communist activists. During her childhood she lived in Quinta Normal and San Fernando, where her father served as councilor and mayor.

In Santiago, she studied at the municipal school of Liceo Cervantes, until her family moved to live in San Fernando, where she completed her schooling at the Liceo José Gregorio Argomedo, a private subsidized Catholic school in the city. She joined the Communist Youth of Chile at the age of 15. Her membership would continue after her entry into higher education, at the Metropolitan University of Educational Sciences (UMCE), which she entered to study pedagogy in philosophy. At this school she was a student leader in the student center of her career for 3 years.

After graduating as a teacher, she taught students at various high schools and colleges in Maipú, Colina, Macul, La Pintana, Puente Alto and Santiago, while studying psychology at the Academy of Christian Humanism University (ACHU). She married Hernán González, leader of the College of Teachers, in 2004, a relationship that ended in 2013, from which she had a son named Joaquín.

== Political history ==
Since graduating from university, she joined the Chilean Teachers Association, where she was elected as a national director and head of education under the presidency of her running mate and fellow communist activist Jaime Gajardo. During her work on the national leadership of the teachers association, she took on a leading role in the 2011–2013 Chilean student protests, where she took on coordination tasks with student leaders and was, along with Gajardo, one of the main leaders of the teachers association in the civil unrest that would last throughout the year.

She ran for the new leadership of the Workers' United Center of Chile (CUT) on August 24, 2012, heading the list of the Communist Party of Chile, where she became the first female president of the CUT and the first woman to head a multi-union in Latin America. With her victory, she ended the 12-year hegemony of the union leader and socialist activist Arturo Martínez at a time when his management was being strongly questioned and the CUT was in disrepute. She took office on September 7, 2012.

In the 2021 elections, to choose the new board of directors of the CUT, her candidacy was surpassed by the socialist politician Silvia Silva, ending the almost 9 years of her leadership.

On March 22, 2022, various media sources reported that she would become Chilean ambassador to Argentina, news that would be confirmed on March 27 of the same year by the Ministry of Foreign Affairs, thus being the first woman to hold this position and the most important international position that a member of the Communist Party has held since the return to democracy in 1990.

On September 24, 2023, after being proclaimed as secretary general by her party, her resignation as ambassador was announced.

== Electoral history ==
=== 2009–2010 Chilean general election ===
Conducted on Sunday 13, 2009.

Candidate	Coalition	Party	Votes	%	Result
Juan Carlos Latorre Carmona	Coalition of Parties for Democracy	PDC	30.300	38.83	Deputy
Ramon Barros Montero	Coalition for Change	UDI	29.622	37.96	Deputy
Lautaro Alliende Carranza	Coalition for Change	RN	9.746	12.49	None
Barbara Figueroa Sandoval	Coalition of Parties for Democracy	PCC	4.011	5.14	None
Lidia Eliana Pizarro Gamboa	Independent Regionalist Party	PRI	2.221	2.85	None
Angela Sasso Baths	Nueva Mayoría	PH	1.275	1.63	None
Eduardo Roman Martinez	Independent Regionalist Party	PRI	862	1.10	None

=== CUT Primary Elections 2012 ===
Conducted on August 23, 2012.

List	Name	Candidate	Total votes	%	Result
B	Unity and Struggle	Barbara Figueroa (PCC)	324,530.9	44%	President
D	Trade Union Autonomy	Arturo Martinez (PS)	304.958	42%	General Secretary
TO	Unitary Alternative	Nolberto Diaz (PDC)	98,232.6	13%	Vice President
C	Workers to Power	Fabian Caballero (MIR)	6.452,3	1%	None

=== 2021 Chilean Constitutional Convention election ===
Conducted on May 16, 2021.

Candidate	Coalition	Party	Votes	%	Result
Benito Baranda Ferran	Non-neutral Independents	Independent	47 217	12.69	Constituent Convention
Beatriz Sanchez Munoz	Approve Dignity	Independent	28 265	7.59	Constituent Convention
Alondra Carrillo Vidal	Constituent Voices	Independent	22 993	6.18	Constituent Convention
Giovanna Grandon Caro	The List of the People	Independent	20 979	5.64	Constituent Convention
Rafael Sotomayor Narbona	The List of the People	Independent	19 442	5.22	None
Macarena Venegas Tassara	Chile Vamos	Independent	17 480	4.70	None
Bastian Bodenhöfer Alexander	Approve Dignity	Independent	16 078	4.32	None
Maria Luisa Cordero Velasquez	Chile Vamos	Independent	15 095	4.06	None
Manuel Jose Ossandon Lira	Chile Vamos	Independent	13 845	3.72	Constituent Convention
Maria Soledad Cisternas Reyes	Non-neutral Independents	Independent	12 761	3.43	None
Camila Cartes Cordero	The List of the People	Independent	12 490	3.36	None
Barbara Figueroa Sandoval	Approve Dignity	PCC	10 153	2.73	None
Bernardita Paul Ossandon	Chile Vamos	RN	9 298	2.50	None
Romanina Morales Baltra	The List of the People	PS	4 663	1.25	None
Hernan Palma Perez	Humanist Party	PH	4 215	1.13	None
Marcela Mella Ortiz	Approve Dignity	Independent	3 712	1.00	None
Juan Jose Martin Bravo	Non-neutral Independents	Independent	2 709	0.73	Constituent Convention
