= Valenzuela (surname) =

Valenzuela is a surname that originated in Spain. Notable people with the name include:

- Alfred Valenzuela, Mexican-American United States Army general
- Arturo Valenzuela, Chilean-American academic
- Brandon Valenzuela, Mexican baseball player
- Cristina Valenzuela, American voice actress
- Eric Valenzuela, American college baseball coach
- Fernando de Valenzuela, 1st Marquis of Villasierra, Spanish royal favourite and minister
- Fernando Valenzuela, Mexican former professional baseball pitcher
- Irene Valenzuela, Spanish physicist
- Ismael Valenzuela, American horse racing jockey
- Jesse Valenzuela, American musician
- Juan Carlos Valenzuela (footballer), Mexican footballer
- Juan Carlos Valenzuela (politician), Honduran politician
- Laura Valenzuela, birth name Rocío Espinosa López-Cepero, Spanish television host, actress, and model
- Luis Malla Valenzuela, Chilean politician
- Luisa Valenzuela, post-modern Argentine novelist
- María Valenzuela (born 1956), Argentine actress
- María Valenzuela (footballer) (born 2002), Spanish footballer
- Mercedes Valenzuela (born 1974), Argentine politician
- Milton Valenzuela (born 1998), Argentine footballer
- Pat Valenzuela, American horse racing jockey, nephew of Ismael Valenzuela
- Pío Valenzuela, Filipino physician and patriot
- Ricardo Valenzuela, American former soccer referee
- Richard Valenzuela, birth name of Mexican-American musician Ritchie Valens

== See also ==
- Valenzuela (disambiguation)
