= Pía Guzmán =

Chilean lawyer and politician (born 1957)

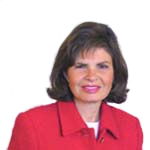

Member of the Chamber of Deputies
- In office 11 March 1998 – 11 March 2006
- Preceded by: Andrés Allamand
- Succeeded by: Cristián Monckeberg
- Constituency: 23rd District

Personal details
- Born: 23 April 1957 (age 69) Santiago, Chile
- Party: National Renewal (RN)
- Spouse: Ramón Infante
- Children: Three
- Education: University of Chile (LL.B)
- Occupation: Politician
- Profession: Lawyer

María Pía Guzmán Mena (born 23 June 1957, Santiago) is a Chilean lawyer, academic, and politician who served as a member of the Chamber of Deputies for District 23 from 1998 to 2006. Before entering politics, she built a prominent career in family law, legal reform, and public policy, holding advisory roles in the Ministry of Justice and at several civic and academic institutions. A member of the National Renewal Party, she also served in senior party leadership positions, including as chief of staff to party president Andrés Allamand. During her parliamentary tenure, she sat on key legislative commissions dealing with constitutional affairs, justice, family policy, and public security.

In 2003, Guzmán became widely known for her public allegations linking unnamed legislators to the Spiniak paedophilia case, a controversy that resulted in legal and political repercussions but ultimately ended with a court ruling in her favour. Aside from her public career, she has been active in journalism, civil society organisations, and legal education.

== Biography ==
Guzmán was born in Santiago on 23 June 1957, the daughter of Luis Guzmán Sánchez and María Pía Mena.

== Education ==
She received her early education at Villa María Academy and Colegio Los Andes in Santiago. Guzmán went on to study law at the University of Chile, where she completed a thesis entitled "Nociones de capacidad y objeto lícito en el derecho comparado" in pursuit of the Bachelor's degree in Legal and Social Sciences.

Between 1981 and 1982 she attended, as an auditor, postgraduate courses in a Master’s program on Contract Law.

== Career ==
Guzmán was admitted to the bar before the Supreme Court on 26 July 1982.

Throughout the late 1970s and 1980s, she combined academic, professional, and research activities: she worked at the law firm of Ricardo Walker Rodríguez (1978–1986), served as a teaching assistant in Civil Law at the University of Chile (1980–1984), and acted as executive secretary of the First International Conference on Family Law in 1983. She also taught Civil Law at the Gabriela Mistral University.

From 1987 to 1989 Guzmán collaborated with the Ministry of Justice as an advisor on Family Law and served as executive secretary of the commission responsible for drafting reforms to the marital property regime. During this period, she also participated in civic education programs aimed at community groups (1988–1989).

In 1990 she contributed to the drafting of a bill establishing an alternative marital property system, "Participación en los gananciales" ("Participation in joint property"), presented by deputies of National Renewal Party. From 1990 to 1993 she served as coordinator of the Family and Women’s Affairs Commission of the Institute Libertad y Desarrollo.

Guzmán later held various roles in public policy, communications, and civil society. She was general manager of Fundación Paz Ciudadana (1993–1997) and advisor to its board of directors. She worked as a columnist for La Tercera (1995–1996), a regular panellist on Palabra de Mujer on Radio Nacional de Chile (1996–1998), and a member of both the steering committee for Criminal Justice Reform (1994–1997) and the Unified System of Crime Statistics (1994–1999). She also served as a member of the Justice and Peace Commission and as advisor to Fundación Generación Empresarial.

== Political career ==
A member of National Renewal, Guzmán served as executive secretary of the party’s Central Committee and Political Commission between 1991 and 1993. During the presidency of Andrés Allamand (1990–1997), she served as his chief of staff.

She was elected to the Chamber of Deputies for District 23 (Las Condes, Lo Barnechea, and Vitacura) for the 1998–2002 legislative term, taking office on 11 March 1998. She sat on the Permanent Commissions on Constitution, Legislation and Justice, and on Family, and was also a member of the Special Commission on Public Safety.

Reelected for the 2002–2006 term, she again represented District 23 and continued her work on the Constitution, Legislation and Justice Commission, the Family Commission, and the Special Commission on Public Safety.

=== Spiniak Case ===
In October 2003, Guzmán accused three members of Congress - without revealing their names - of being involved in a paedophile network allegedly headed by businessman Claudio Spiniak. According to her statement, the parliamentarians supposedly implicated were two senators from the Alliance for Chile and one from the Christian Democratic Party.

An article by writer Pablo Huneeus later claimed that senators Carlos Bombal and Jovino Novoa, both members of the Independent Democratic Union (UDI), were the individuals alluded to by Guzmán.

The UDI filed a criminal complaint against the parliamentarian for libel and slander, and later asked the judge handling the case to summon Guzmán so she would disclose the source of her allegations.

In 2004, the courts ruled in Guzmán’s favour, stating that her statements did not carry criminal implications.

Following the scandal surrounding her statements in the Spiniak Case, the National Renewal Party decided not to renew her slot for the 2005 parliamentary elections.

== Personal life ==
She married Ramón Infante Infante, with whom she has three children.

On 23 July 2008, Guzmán underwent a medical examination, which resulted in her being diagnosed with acute myeloid leukaemia. She was then hospitalised in complete isolation to prevent infections due to her weakened immune system and began an intensive course of chemotherapy. In September 2009, she announced that the disease was in complete remission.
