= Cancino =

Cancino is a surname of Italian origin.

== Geographical presence ==
The Cancino family are primarily rooted in the city of Genoa.

In Italy, historical toponyms and modern structures associated with the surname are concentrated in the commune of Borgosesia, within the Province of Vercelli in the Piedmont region. Within this municipality, the name is tied to local geography and public infrastructure, such as the Scuola dell'Infanzia "Cancino", a public school.

== Notable people with the surname ==
- Adriana Cancino (born 1962), Chilean teacher
- Isaías Duarte Cancino (1939–2002), Colombian Catholic priest
- Iván Cancino (born 1976), Colombian lawyer and politician
- Pablo Chacón Cancino (born 1975), Chilean politician
- Sofía Cancino de Cuevas (1897–1982), Mexican composer and pianist
- Víctor Cancino (born 1972), Chilean footballer
- Yvon Cancino (born 1979), Peruvian volleyball player
