= José Miguel Castro =

Chilean politician

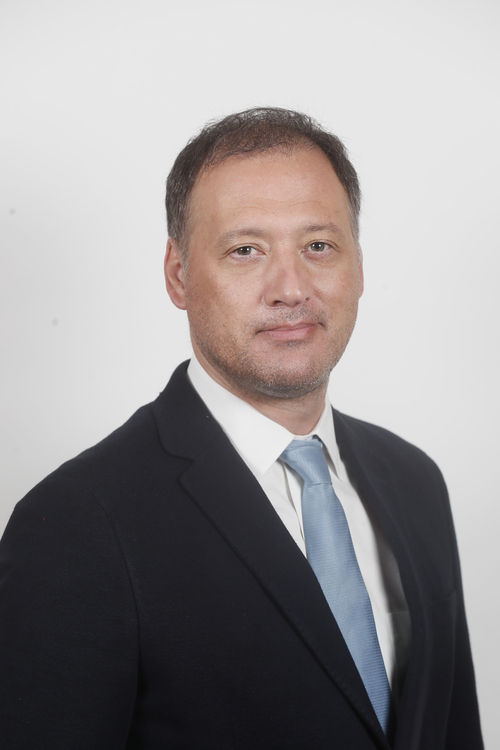

President of the Chamber of Deputies
- In office 7 April 2025 – 11 March 2026
- Preceded by: Gaspar Rivas
- Succeeded by: Jorge Alessandri Vergara

Member of the Chamber of Deputies
- In office 11 March 2018 – 11 March 2026
- Constituency: District 3 (2018–2022); District 2 (2022–2026)

Personal details
- Born: 5 August 1974 (age 52) Antofagasta, Chile
- Party: National Renewal (RN)
- Spouse: Vania Catalina Korlaet Gómez
- Children: 2
- Education: Universidad Mayor; University for Development (MS)

José Miguel Castro Bascuñán (born 5 August 1974) is a Chilean politician who has served as President of the Chamber of Deputies of Chile since 2025. Castro was first elected to the chamber in 2017 as a member of National Renewal.

== Early life and education ==
José Miguel Castro Bascuñán was born in Santiago, Chile, on 4 September 1974, to Moisés Castro Bocaz and María Josefina Bascuñán Santa Cruz. He graduated from Pontifical Minor Seminary School in Las Condes. in 1993. He attended Gabriela Mistral University to study psychology, but moved to Universidad Mayor and graduated with a degree in veterinary medicine. He graduated with a master's degree in environmental management from the University for Development in 2012.

== Career ==
On Mega Castro was the host of the television programme La Ley de la Selva. He moved to Antofagasta, in 2010, and created an environmental company. Castro worked as a veterinarian.

In the 2017 election Castro was elected to the Chamber of Deputies of Chile from District 3 as a member of National Renewal. He was reelected in the 2021 election from District 2.

During Castro's tenure in the chamber he has served on the Public Works, Transportation and Telecommunications, Mining and Energy, International Regulations and Administration, Environment and Natural Resources, and Citizen Security committees. On 7 April 2025, Castro was elected president of the chamber, with him being the first person from the Antofagasta Region to hold it.

== Personal life ==
Castro married Vania Catalina Korlaet Gómez, with whom he had two children.

== Works cited ==
- "Diputado José Miguel Castro Bascuñán". Chamber of Deputies of Chile. Archived from the original on 25 June 2025.
- "José Miguel Castro Bascuñán". Library of the National Congress of Chile. Archived from the original on 25 June 2025.
