= District 3 (Chamber of Deputies of Chile) =

Electoral district of the Chamber of Deputies of Chile

- Distrito 3
- Electoral District for the Chamber of Deputies
- Location of District 3 within Chile
- Region: Antofagasta
- Population: 607,534 (2017)
- Electorate: 481,800 (2021)
- Area: 126,067 km^{2} (2020)

Current Electoral District
- Created: 2017
- Seats: 5 (2017–present)
- Deputies: List: Yovana Ahumada (PSC); Jaime Araya (Ind); José Miguel Castro (RN); Catalina Pérez (FA); Sebastián Videla (Ind)

District 3 (Spanish: Distrito 3) is one of the 28 multi-member electoral districts of the Chamber of Deputies, the lower house of the National Congress, the national legislature of Chile. The district was created by the 2015 electoral reform and came into being at the following general election in 2017. It is conterminous with the region of Antofagasta. The district currently elects five of the 155 members of the Chamber of Deputies using the open party-list proportional representation electoral system. At the 2021 general election the district had 481,800 registered electors.

== Electoral system ==
District 3 currently elects five of the 155 members of the Chamber of Deputies using the open party-list proportional representation electoral system. Parties may form electoral pacts with each other to pool their votes and increase their chances of winning seats. However, the number of candidates nominated by an electoral pact may not exceed the maximum number of candidates that a single party may nominate. Seats are allocated using the D'Hondt method.

== Election results ==
=== Summary ===
Election	Apruebo Dignidad AD / FA			Dignidad Ahora DA			New Social Pact NPS / NM			Democratic Convergence CD			Chile Vamos Podemos / Vamos			Party of the People PDG			Christian Social Front FSC		
Election	Votes	%	Seats	Votes	%	Seats	Votes	%	Seats	Votes	%	Seats	Votes	%	Seats	Votes	%	Seats	Votes	%	Seats
2021	36,147	19.85%	1	5,623	3.09%	0	37,396	20.53%	2				33,464	18.37%	1	33,784	18.55%	1	13,099	7.19%	0
2017	20,638	12.71%	1				40,414	24.89%	1	6,361	3.92%	0	55,394	34.11%	2						

=== Detailed ===
==== 2021 ====
Results of the 2021 general election held on 21 November 2021:

Party		Pact	Party												Pact		
Party		Pact	Votes per commune									Total votes	%	Seats	Votes	%	Seats
Party		Pact	Anto- fagasta	Calama	María Elena	Mejil- lones	Olla- güe	San Pedro de Ata- cama	Sierra Gorda	Taltal	Toco- pilla	Total votes	%	Seats	Votes	%	Seats
Liberal Party of Chile	PL	New Social Pact	11,670	286	50	85	6	10	29	38	92	12,266	6.73%	1	37,396	20.53%	2
Party for Democracy	PPD	New Social Pact	9,687	596	57	393	6	35	94	542	235	11,645	6.39%	1	37,396	20.53%	2
Christian Democratic Party	PDC	New Social Pact	1,717	5,397	33	41	35	134	13	59	206	7,635	4.19%	0	37,396	20.53%	2
Radical Party of Chile	PR	New Social Pact	2,319	447	30	43	3	60	3	48	72	3,025	1.66%	0	37,396	20.53%	2
Socialist Party of Chile	PS	New Social Pact	983	291	14	37	6	30	2	55	61	1,479	0.81%	0	37,396	20.53%	2
Citizens	CIU	New Social Pact	309	920	10	17	2	16	0	12	60	1,346	0.74%	0	37,396	20.53%	2
Democratic Revolution	RD	Apruebo Dignidad	12,120	4,373	85	235	19	231	34	279	350	17,726	9.73%	1	36,147	19.85%	1
Communist Party of Chile	PC	Apruebo Dignidad	8,201	1,421	79	234	7	128	29	324	279	10,702	5.88%	0	36,147	19.85%	1
Social Green Regionalist Federation	FREVS	Apruebo Dignidad	3,532	2,655	48	102	23	320	15	99	925	7,719	4.24%	0	36,147	19.85%	1
Party of the People	PDG		17,734	12,320	478	887	72	387	112	423	1,371	33,784	18.55%	1	33,784	18.55%	1
National Renewal	RN	Chile Podemos +	7,781	5,757	83	224	28	182	41	251	453	14,800	8.13%	1	33,464	18.37%	1
Evópoli	EVO	Chile Podemos +	8,542	1,653	54	104	4	83	17	160	370	10,987	6.03%	0	33,464	18.37%	1
Independent Democratic Union	UDI	Chile Podemos +	4,354	2,665	59	128	40	100	20	111	200	7,677	4.22%	0	33,464	18.37%	1
Republican Party	REP	Christian Social Front	8,785	3,331	76	184	25	128	44	185	341	13,099	7.19%	0	13,099	7.19%	0
United Centre	CU	United Independents	4,654	3,571	107	198	18	344	44	161	350	9,447	5.19%	0	9,447	5.19%	0
Revolutionary Workers Party	PTR		5,480	1,613	76	195	10	104	16	118	1,030	8,642	4.75%	0	8,642	4.75%	0
Equality Party	IGUAL	Dignidad Ahora	1,649	1,582	50	98	13	413	6	67	184	4,062	2.23%	0	5,623	3.09%	0
Humanist Party	PH	Dignidad Ahora	888	404	27	38	1	28	6	36	133	1,561	0.86%	0	5,623	3.09%	0
New Time	NT		1,210	882	29	63	6	56	20	38	90	2,394	1.31%	0	2,394	1.31%	0
Progressive Party	PRO		1,088	798	22	53	5	33	10	35	87	2,131	1.17%	0	2,131	1.17%	0
Valid votes			112,703	50,962	1,467	3,359	329	2,822	555	3,041	6,889	182,127	100.00%	5	182,127	100.00%	5
Blank votes			4,921	3,077	201	289	31	250	41	385	789	9,984	4.90%				
Rejected votes – other			5,982	3,877	171	254	12	227	48	224	714	11,509	5.65%				
Total polled			123,606	57,916	1,839	3,902	372	3,299	644	3,650	8,392	203,620	42.26%				
Registered electors			289,086	131,956	6,173	10,072	1,663	7,279	2,882	10,493	22,196	481,800					
Turnout			42.76%	43.89%	29.79%	38.74%	22.37%	45.32%	22.35%	34.79%	37.81%	42.26%					

The following candidates were elected: Yovana Ahumada (PDG), 11,892 votes; Jaime Araya (PPD), 11,645 votes; José Miguel Castro (RN), 8,542 votes; Catalina Pérez (RD), 13,235 votes; and Sebastián Videla (PL), 12,266 votes.

==== 2017 ====
Results of the 2017 general election held on 19 November 2017:

Party		Pact	Party												Pact		
Party		Pact	Votes per commune									Total votes	%	Seats	Votes	%	Seats
Party		Pact	Anto- fagasta	Calama	María Elena	Mejil- lones	Olla- güe	San Pedro de Ata- cama	Sierra Gorda	Taltal	Toco- pilla	Total votes	%	Seats	Votes	%	Seats
National Renewal	RN	Chile Vamos	29,552	9,524	325	906	25	326	84	902	1,307	42,951	26.45%	2	55,394	34.11%	2
Independent Democratic Union	UDI	Chile Vamos	3,569	2,668	77	100	44	108	30	33	203	6,832	4.21%	0	55,394	34.11%	2
Independent Regionalist Party	PRI	Chile Vamos	1,595	1,074	42	92	1	60	205	40	84	3,193	1.97%	0	55,394	34.11%	2
Evópoli	EVO	Chile Vamos	1,885	343	31	38	3	36	6	26	50	2,418	1.49%	0	55,394	34.11%	2
Social Democrat Radical Party	PRSD	Nueva Mayoría	14,127	5,809	160	352	16	216	51	243	1,672	22,646	13.95%	1	40,414	24.89%	1
Party for Democracy	PPD	Nueva Mayoría	7,179	811	30	390	9	59	33	336	150	8,997	5.54%	0	40,414	24.89%	1
Socialist Party of Chile	PS	Nueva Mayoría	2,880	1,358	78	115	1	52	71	273	839	5,667	3.49%	0	40,414	24.89%	1
Communist Party of Chile	PC	Nueva Mayoría	2,012	661	38	84	2	34	6	81	186	3,104	1.91%	0	40,414	24.89%	1
Social Green Regionalist Federation	FREVS	Green Regionalist Coalition	6,672	9,214	46	92	66	323	23	49	115	16,600	10.22%	1	23,342	14.38%	1
Patagonian Regional Democracy	DRP	Green Regionalist Coalition	4,032	2,014	64	152	7	99	24	117	233	6,742	4.15%	0	23,342	14.38%	1
Democratic Revolution	RD	Broad Front	7,484	1,572	53	144	3	131	28	182	128	9,725	5.99%	1	20,638	12.71%	1
Humanist Party	PH	Broad Front	3,155	922	57	174	1	70	6	53	1,291	5,729	3.53%	0	20,638	12.71%	1
Equality Party	IGUAL	Broad Front	1,130	1,733	28	49	13	79	3	25	42	3,102	1.91%	0	20,638	12.71%	1
Liberal Party of Chile	PL	Broad Front	928	249	6	27	2	15	2	5	25	1,259	0.78%	0	20,638	12.71%	1
Citizen Power	PODER	Broad Front	589	153	7	14	1	23	0	10	26	823	0.51%	0	20,638	12.71%	1
Amplitude	AMP	Sumemos	3,524	1,095	38	74	8	58	27	53	97	4,974	3.06%	0	8,659	5.33%	0
Citizens	CIU	Sumemos	1,750	1,131	25	39	2	24	2	455	257	3,685	2.27%	0	8,659	5.33%	0
Christian Democratic Party	PDC	Democratic Convergence	3,581	1,163	48	100	3	80	38	543	199	5,755	3.54%	0	6,361	3.92%	0
Citizen Left	IC	Democratic Convergence	237	259	12	19	3	27	2	16	31	606	0.37%	0	6,361	3.92%	0
Revolutionary Workers Party	PTR		2,814	1,185	63	139	11	108	23	97	221	4,661	2.87%	0	4,661	2.87%	0
Progressive Party	PRO	All Over Chile	1,229	1,311	60	70	5	77	7	46	101	2,906	1.79%	0	2,906	1.79%	0
Valid votes			99,924	44,249	1,288	3,170	226	2,005	671	3,585	7,257	162,375	100.00%	5	162,375	100.00%	5
Blank votes			3,575	2,921	190	268	25	318	23	236	519	8,075	4.48%				
Rejected votes – other			5,017	3,326	148	239	13	184	28	156	491	9,602	5.33%				
Total polled			108,516	50,496	1,626	3,677	264	2,507	722	3,977	8,267	180,052	40.12%				
Registered electors			264,504	125,030	6,607	9,058	2,027	5,903	3,588	10,133	21,912	448,762					
Turnout			41.03%	40.39%	24.61%	40.59%	13.02%	42.47%	20.12%	39.25%	37.73%	40.12%					

The following candidates were elected: José Miguel Castro (RN), 5,183 votes; Marcela Hernando (PRSD), 14,817 votes; Paulina Núñez (RN), 37,768 votes; Catalina Pérez (RD), 6,106 votes; and Esteban Velásquez (FREVS), 10,067 votes.
