= Daniela Dresdner =

Chilean politician

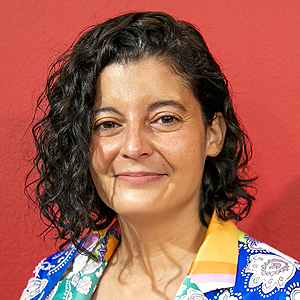

Presidential Delegate for Bío Bío Region
- In office 11 March 2022 – 11 March 2026
- Appointed by: Gabriel Boric
- Preceded by: Patricio Kuhn

Personal details
- Born: 21 November 1984 (age 41) Santiago, Chile
- Party: Democratic Revolution (RD)
- Education: University of Concepción; University of Chile (MA)
- Occupation: Politician
- Profession: Sociologist

Daniela Dresdner Vicencio (Uppsala, November 21, 1984) is a Chilean sociologist and politician, a member of the Democratic Revolution. Since March 11, 2022, she has served as regional presidential delegate of Biobío in the government of Gabriel Boric.

== Early years and studies ==
She was born in Uppsala, Sweden, to Chilean parents who were exiled during the Pinochet dictatorship. Her father, Jorge Dresdner Cid, is the director of strategic studies at the University of Concepción, and her mother, Paulina Vicencio Guzmán, worked as a pharmacy assistant at the Los Ángeles hospital in 1973. When she was five years old, she and her family moved to Chiguayante.

She attended public schools in Greater Concepción area. Later, she pursued sociology at the University of Concepción. During her studies, she actively participated in student movements where she learned about social movements and struggles. She did her thesis on urban Mapuche, where she understood the discrimination of which they are victims. After graduating, she was granted a scholarship to pursue a master's degree at the University of Chile. There, she worked on territorial interventions in the Arauco Zone, where she encountered rural Mapuche communities and their conflicts with companies seeking to intervene in sacred territories. She also worked at Fundación Urbanismo Social where she assisted social housing neighborhoods in Greater Concepción and Los Ángeles.

== Political career ==
She founded the Democratic Revolution party in the Biobío Region and served as chief of staff for deputy Catalina Pérez between 2018 and 2022. She is considered a key figure in the "tercerismo" movement within the party and is known for her close relationship with Giorgio Jackson, the Minister Secretary General of the Presidency. In June 2021, she was elected as the regional president of her party.

In the 2021 parliamentary elections, she was a candidate for senator for the tenth constituency of Biobío. She obtained 37,540 votes, equivalent to 6.84% of the preferences, but was not elected.

On February 28, 2022, the newly elected president Gabriel Boric named her as presidential delegate of the Biobío Region, a position she assumed on March 11, when the new government took office.
