= Catalina Pérez =

Catalina Pérez may refer to:

- Catalina Pérez (footballer, born 1994), Colombian footballer who plays as a goalkeeper
- Catalina Pérez (footballer, born 1989), Argentine footballer who plays as a defender
- Catalina Pérez Salinas, Chilean politician
