= Avancemos Chile =

Let's Move Forward Chile Avancemos Chile
- Abbreviation: ACH
- President: Enrique Lee
- General Secretary: Víctor Pino
- Financial Administrator: Yovana Ahumada
- Founded: 24 February 2023
- Registered: 5 September 2023 (declared "in formation")
- Dissolved: 18 April 2024
- Split from: Party of the People
- Merged into: Democrats (partly)
- Ideology: Populism; North Chile regionalism Anti-immigration
- Political position: Centre-right
- Colours: Blue

Website
- X page

Avancemos Chile (ACH, lit. 'Let's Move Forward Chile') was a short-lived Chilean political party which was founded in February 2023 by former militants of the Party of the People (PDG) and independents. The party had three members in the Chamber of Deputies before its collapse.

== History ==
The party emerged after the Party of the People's parliamentary faction broke up following the election of liberal Vlado Mirosevic as president of the Chamber of Deputies and the insults issued by deputy Gaspar Rivas against some of his coreligionists.

In December 2022, deputies Yovana Ahumada and Víctor Pino announced their resignation from the Party of the People and joined a new bloc, made up of the independent Enrique Lee and members of the new Christian Social Party (PSC).

On 24 February 2023, deputies Ahumada, Pino and Lee announced the creation of a new political party, which would focus on the north of Chile. In September of that same year the party was declared "in formation" by the Electoral Service (Servel).

In January 2024, Deputies Ahumada and Pino joined the Democrats Party bench as independents. In April of that same year, Servel declared the dissolution of Avancemos Chile for not gathering the necessary signatures for its constitution as a political party.

== Leadership ==
The central leadership of the party was composed of:

- President: Enrique Lee Flores
- General Secretary: Víctor Pino Fuentes
- Financial Administrator: Yovana Ahumada Palma

== Legislative representatives ==
The Advance Chile deputies for the legislative period 2022-2026 were:

Name	Region	Division
Enrique Lee Flores (former PRI member)	Arica y Parinacota	1
Yovana Ahumada Palma (former PDG member)	Antofagasta	3
Víctor Pino Fuentes (former PDG member)	Coquimbo	5
