= Cristián Monckeberg =

Chilean politician

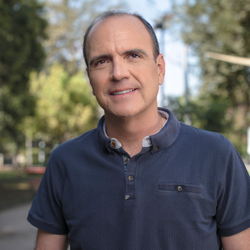
- Cristián Monckeberg in 2021.

Member of the Constitutional Convention
- In office 4 July 2021 – 4 July 2022
- Constituency: 10th District

Minister Secretary-General of the Presidency
- In office 28 July 2020 – 6 January 2021
- Preceded by: Claudio Alvarado
- Succeeded by: Juan José Ossa

Minister of Social Development
- In office 4 June 2020 – 28 July 2020
- Preceded by: Sebastián Sichel
- Succeeded by: Karla Rubilar

Minister of Housing & Urbanism
- In office 11 March 2018 – 4 June 2020
- Preceded by: Paulina Saball
- Succeeded by: Felipe Ward

President of Renovación Nacional
- In office 21 June 2014 – 10 March 2018
- Preceded by: Carlos Larraín
- Succeeded by: Mario Desbordes

Member of the Chamber of Deputies of Chile
- In office 11 March 2006 – 11 March 2018
- Preceded by: Pía Guzmán
- Succeeded by: Dissolution of the district
- Constituency: 23rd District

Counsilman of Ñuñoa
- In office 26 September 1992 – 6 December 1998

Personal details
- Born: 12 May 1968 (age 58) Santiago, Chile
- Party: Renovación Nacional (1989–)
- Spouse(s): Consuelo Guzmán; Paulina Núñez Urrutia (2018–)
- Children: Three
- Parent(s): Paulina Bruner Varas; Jorge Monckeberg Barros
- Relatives: Gustavo Monckeberg (uncle); Nicolás Monckeberg (cousin); Sergio Urrejola Monckeberg (cousin)
- Education: Gabriela Mistral University (LL.B); University of Navarra (LL.M)
- Occupation: Politician
- Profession: Lawyer

Cristián Monckeberg Bruner (born 12 May 1968) is a Chilean lawyer and politician. A member of National Renewal (Chile), he served as President of the party from 2014 and 2018 and held several cabinet positions during the second administration of President Sebastián Piñera, including Minister of Housing and Urban Development, Minister of Social Development and Family, and Minister Secretary-General of the Presidency.

On 28 July 2020, after Piñera's fifth change of cabinet, he was appointed as Minister Secretary General of the Presidency, succeeding Claudio Alvarado. Then, Monckeberg resigned on 6 January 2021 to run for a quote as a conventional constituent for 10th district in the elections of April.

== Early life and family ==
Monckeberg was born on 12 May 1968 in Santiago, Chile. He is the son of Paulina Bruner Varas and Jorge Monckeberg Barros, who served as mayor of Ñuñoa between 1960 and 1970.

He is the nephew of Gustavo Monckeberg Barros, Alicia Monckeberg Barros—mayor of Algarrobo between 1967 and 1992—and Gerardo Monckeberg Balmaceda, a municipal councillor of Ñuñoa between 2004 and 2008. He is also the uncle of former deputy and Minister of Labor and Social Security Nicolás Monckeberg.

He is the father of Camila, Jorge, and Esteban, and is married to Paulina Núñez Urrutia, senator for the 3rd Senatorial Circumscription of the Antofagasta Region.

== Professional career ==
Monckeberg studied at Colegio Tabancura in Santiago. He later studied law at Gabriela Mistral University, earning a degree in Legal and Social Sciences with a thesis titled Dispute Resolution Systems between States and Foreign Investors: Treaties on the Subject. He qualified as a lawyer on 6 June 1994.

He later completed a Master’s degree in Business Law at the University of Navarra in Spain.

Professionally, he specialized in civil and commercial law. He worked at Banco Santander and practiced as a private lawyer at the firm Monckeberg, Flores y Cía.

In 2000, he founded the non-governmental organization and website Denunciemos.cl, aimed at enabling citizens to report acts they consider unjust.

== Political career ==
In 1989, Monckeberg was elected president of the Youth Wing of National Renewal for Ñuñoa and Providencia, later becoming leader of the party’s youth organization in the Metropolitan Region in 1990.

In 1992, he was elected municipal councillor of Ñuñoa, serving until 1996. In 2000, he ran unsuccessfully as a candidate for the Chamber of Deputies representing District No. 21 (Ñuñoa and Providencia).

In 2003, he was elected Secretary General of National Renewal and later served as Vice President of the party. In May 2014, he was elected President of National Renewal, holding the position until 10 March 2018.

On 11 March 2018, President Sebastián Piñera appointed him Minister of Housing and Urban Development. He held the position until 4 June 2020, when he was appointed Minister of Social Development and Family. On 28 July 2020, he became Minister Secretary-General of the Presidency, a position he held until 6 January 2021.
