= Valenzuela =

Valenzuela may refer to:

== Places ==
- Valenzuela, Paraguay
- Valenzuela, Metro Manila, Philippines
- Valenzuela, Spain
- Valenzuela de Calatrava, Spain
- Valenzuela, Louisiana

== Other uses ==
- Valenzuela (surname), including a list of people with the name
- Valenzuela (insect), a genus of barklice in the family Caeciliusidae
