= Nicolás Monckeberg =

Chilean politician

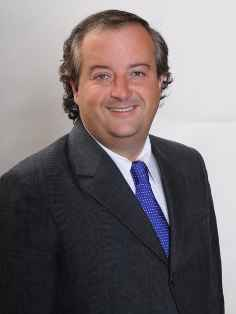

Ambassador of Chile to Argentina
- In office 6 January 2020 – 31 March 2022
- President: Sebastián Piñera
- Preceded by: Sergio Urrejola Monckeberg
- Succeeded by: Bárbara Figueroa

Minister of Labor and Social Providence
- In office 11 March 2018 – 28 October 2019
- President: Sebastián Piñera
- Preceded by: Alejandra Krauss
- Succeeded by: María José Zaldívar

President of the Chamber of Deputies
- In office 22 March 2012 – 3 April 2013
- Preceded by: Patricio Melero
- Succeeded by: Edmundo Eluchans

Member of Chamber of Deputies
- In office 11 March 2010 – 11 March 2018
- Preceded by: Carlos Olivares
- Succeeded by: District dissolved
- Constituency: 18th District
- In office 11 March 2002 – 11 March 2010
- Preceded by: Iván Mesías Lehu
- Succeeded by: Frank Sauerbaum
- Constituency: 42nd District

Personal details
- Party: Renovación Nacional
- Spouse: Isabel Cruz
- Relations: Cristián Monckeberg (cousin)
- Children: Four
- Education: Pontifical Catholic University of Chile (LL.B); Harvard University (LL.M)
- Occupation: Politician
- Profession: Lawyer

Nicolas Monckeberg Díaz (born 31 July 1973) is a Chilean politician. He was born in a family of German descent. He completed his secondary education in the Tabancura College in Santiago.

Monckeberg obtained his LL.B degree from the Pontifical Catholic University of Chile. Similarly, he completed a Master of Liberal Arts major at Harvard Extension School.

He was the President of the Chamber of Deputies of Chile between 2012 and 2013.

== Early life and family ==
He was born on 31 July 1973 in Santiago, Chile. He is the son of Manuel José Mönckeberg Balmaceda and Margarita Díaz Herrera. He is the grandson of Gustavo Monckeberg Barros and cousin of Cristián Monckeberg.

He is also the nephew of Gerardo Monckeberg Balmaceda, councilor of Ñuñoa (2004–2008); Jorge Monckeberg Barros, mayor of Ñuñoa (1960–1970); Alicia Monckeberg Barros, mayor of Algarrobo (1967–1992); and Cristián Monckeberg Bruner, former Deputy and Minister of Housing and Urbanism.

He is married to Isabel Margarita Cruz and is the father of three daughters—Isabel, Sofía, and Angelita—and one son.

== Professional career ==
He completed his secondary education at Colegio Tabancura in Santiago. He later studied law at the Pontificia Universidad Católica de Chile, where he obtained a bachelor's degree in Legal and Social Sciences with the thesis "Las Fuerzas Armadas en Democracia" (1997). He was admitted to the bar on 13 September 1999.

He subsequently completed a Master of Liberal Arts with a concentration in Government at Harvard University.

== Political career ==
He served as president of the youth wing of National Renewal (RN).

In the 1996 municipal elections, at the age of 23, he was elected councilor of the Commune of Santiago for the 1997–2000 term, serving on several occasions as acting mayor.

At the beginning of Sebastián Piñera's second term, he was appointed Minister of Labour and Social Welfare, serving until 28 October 2019. In January 2020 he was appointed by President Piñera as Ambassador of Chile to Argentina.
