= Waldo L. Parra =

Chilean lawyer and novelist

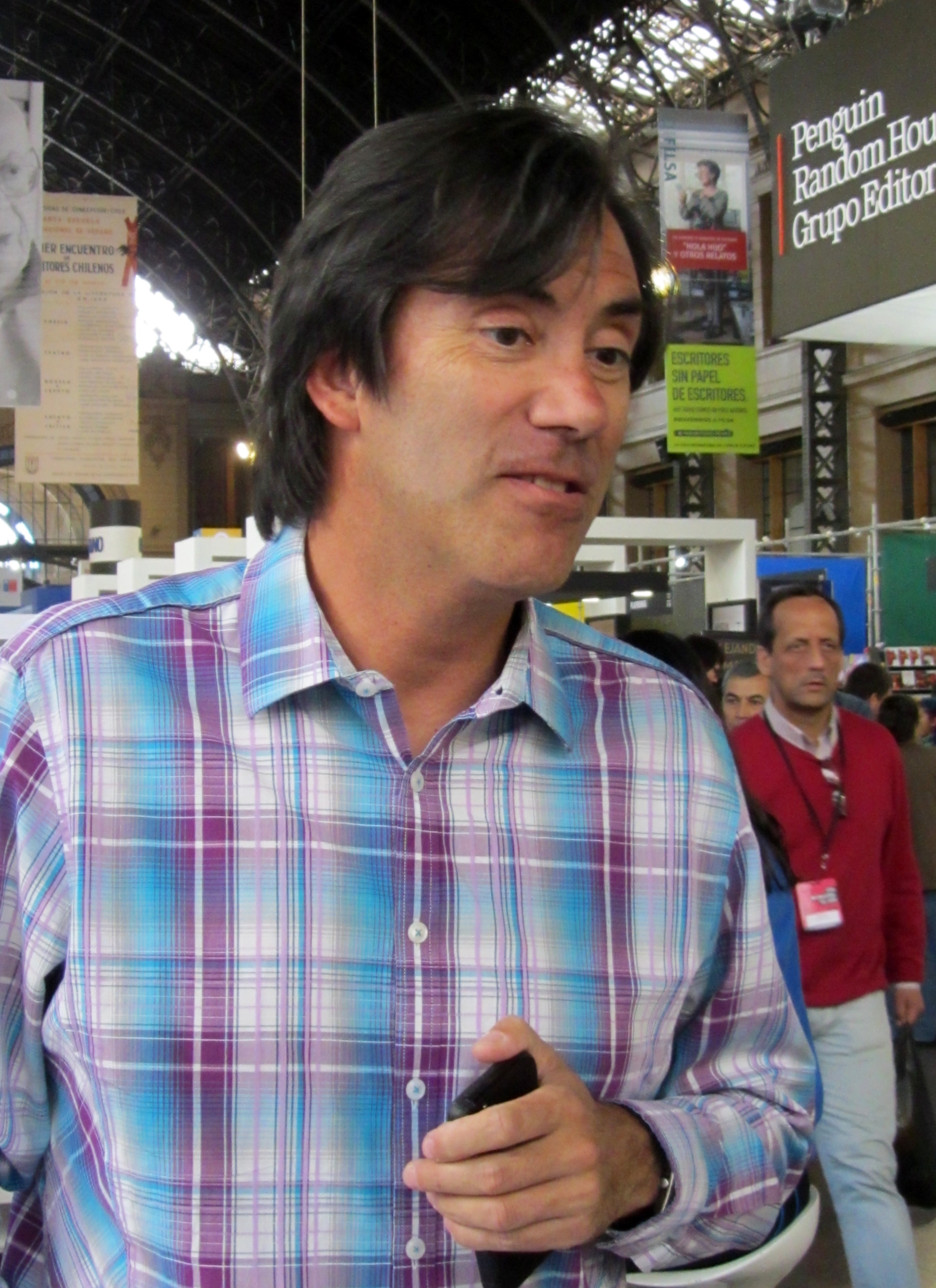
- Waldo L. Parra (FILSA 2016)
- Born: Waldo Leonidas Parra Pizarro; 2 December 1965 (age 60); Santiago, Chile
- Education: Pontifical Catholic University of Chile
- Occupation: Lawyer
- Writing career
- Genre: Historical novel
- Notable works: Masones & Libertadores series
- Website: masonesylibertadores.weebly.com

Waldo Leonidas Parra Pizarro (born 2 December 1965) is a Chilean lawyer, Ph.D. in Law, university professor and novelist. He is the author of the national bestseller Masones & Libertadores.

In 2016 he released the first part of the trilogy Masones & Libertadores (published by Planeta), later in 2017 the second part was released and in 2018 he published the third part.

Since 2000 he has been a member of the José Miguel Carrera General Historical Research Institute and since 2012 he has been a member of the Society for Evolutionary Analysis in Law.

He is currently a member lawyer of the Illustrious Court of Appeals of San Miguel and professor at the University of Chile and Gabriela Mistral University, where he teaches law.

== Biography ==
Waldo was born in Santiago, Chile on 2 December 1965. At an early age he and his family move to Punta Arenas. In that city, Parra studied in the Salesian School of San José. When he moved back to Santiago he studied in the German School of Santiago, after graduating he starts studying Law at the Pontifical Catholic University of Valparaíso. In 1996 he got a degree in Legal and Social Sciences and in 1997 he became lawyer, in 2003 he obtained the degree of Master in Economic Law in the University of Chile. In 2009 he obtained the degree of Master in Legal Sciences and in 2012 his quality of Doctor of Law in the Pontifical Catholic University of Chile. In 2011 he was Visiting Researcher in the University of California, Santa Barbara, United States.

Since 2012 he has taught law at the University of Chile and since 2017 at Gabriela Mistral University, and since 2018 he has been a member lawyer of the Illustrious Court of Appeals of San Miguel.

=== Writing ===
In 2016 he published the first book of the Masones & Libertadores series called Masones & Libertadores - The awakening of the Republic (El amanecer de la República) In 2017 he released the second part called Masones & Libertadores - The secret of the Lodge (El secreto de la Logia) and in 2018 he published the last part called Masones & Libertadores - The legacy of the Heroes (El legado de los Héroes)

He has been in the Santiago International Book Fair (FILSA) in 2016 and 2017.

His books are available in the most important libraries of Chile, and also in eBook format.

== Bibliography ==
=== Masones & Libertadores series ===
- Masones & Libertadores - El amanecer de la República (2016)
- Masones & Libertadores - El secreto de la Logia (2017)
- Masones & Libertadores - El legado de Los Héroes (2018)
