= District 1 (Chamber of Deputies of Chile) =

Electoral district of the Chamber of Deputies of Chile

- Distrito 1
- Electoral District for the Chamber of Deputies
- Location of District 1 within Chile
- Region: Arica y Parinacota
- Population: 226,068 (2017)
- Electorate: 191,628 (2021)
- Area: 16,864 km^{2} (2020)

Current Electoral District
- Created: 2017
- Seats: 3 (2017–present)
- Deputies: List: Enrique Lee (Ind); Luis Malla (PL); Vlado Mirosevic (PL)

District 1 (Spanish: Distrito 1) is one of the 28 multi-member electoral districts of the Chamber of Deputies, the lower house of the National Congress, the national legislature of Chile. The district was created by the 2015 electoral reform and came into being at the following general election in 2017. It is conterminous with the region of Arica y Parinacota. The district currently elects three of the 155 members of the Chamber of Deputies using the open party-list proportional representation electoral system. At the 2021 general election the district had 191,628 registered electors.

== Electoral system ==
District 1 currently elects three of the 155 members of the Chamber of Deputies using the open party-list proportional representation electoral system. Parties may form electoral pacts with each other to pool their votes and increase their chances of winning seats. However, the number of candidates nominated by an electoral pact may not exceed the maximum number of candidates that a single party may nominate. Seats are allocated using the D'Hondt method.

== Election results ==
=== Summary ===
Election	Apruebo Dignidad AD / FA			Dignidad Ahora DA			New Social Pact NPS / NM			Democratic Convergence CD			Chile Vamos Podemos / Vamos			Party of the People PDG			Christian Social Front FSC		
Election	Votes	%	Seats	Votes	%	Seats	Votes	%	Seats	Votes	%	Seats	Votes	%	Seats	Votes	%	Seats	Votes	%	Seats
2021	7,270	9.04%	0	1,847	2.30%	0	28,618	35.57%	2				18,880	23.47%	1	9,789	12.17%	0	12,106	15.05%	0
2017	27,333	38.39%	1				15,957	22.41%	1	2,416	3.39%	0	15,164	21.30%	1						

=== Detailed ===
==== 2021 ====
Results of the 2021 general election held on 21 November 2021:

Party		Pact	Party							Pact		
Party		Pact	Votes per commune				Total votes	%	Seats	Votes	%	Seats
Party		Pact	Arica	Cama- rones	General Lagos	Putre	Total votes	%	Seats	Votes	%	Seats
Liberal Party of Chile	PL	New Social Pact	19,107	153	23	225	19,508	24.25%	2	28,618	35.57%	2
Socialist Party of Chile	PS	New Social Pact	8,736	146	34	194	9,110	11.32%	0	28,618	35.57%	2
Democratic Independent Regionalist Party	PRI	Chile Podemos +	7,047	90	26	157	7,320	9.10%	1	18,880	23.47%	1
National Renewal	RN	Chile Podemos +	5,611	259	242	640	6,752	8.39%	0	18,880	23.47%	1
Independent Democratic Union	UDI	Chile Podemos +	2,910	54	6	27	2,997	3.73%	0	18,880	23.47%	1
Evópoli	EVO	Chile Podemos +	1,761	25	6	19	1,811	2.25%	0	18,880	23.47%	1
Republican Party	REP	Christian Social Front	11,790	63	36	217	12,106	15.05%	0	12,106	15.05%	0
Party of the People	PDG		9,525	102	50	112	9,789	12.17%	0	9,789	12.17%	0
Social Green Regionalist Federation	FREVS	Apruebo Dignidad	3,251	33	4	38	3,326	4.13%	0	7,270	9.04%	0
Communist Party of Chile	PC	Apruebo Dignidad	3,048	32	2	14	3,096	3.85%	0	7,270	9.04%	0
Comunes	COM	Apruebo Dignidad	826	8	6	8	848	1.05%	0	7,270	9.04%	0
Humanist Party	PH	Dignidad Ahora	1,581	31	38	197	1,847	2.30%	0	1,847	2.30%	0
Revolutionary Workers Party	PTR		1,364	23	1	9	1,397	1.74%	0	1,397	1.74%	0
New Time	NT		526	6	0	14	546	0.68%	0	546	0.68%	0
Valid votes			77,083	1,025	474	1,871	80,453	100.00%	3	80,453	100.00%	3
Blank votes			2,030	33	22	61	2,146	2.50%				
Rejected votes – other			3,132	35	17	69	3,253	3.79%				
Total polled			82,245	1,093	513	2,001	85,852	44.80%				
Registered electors			180,736	3,196	1,948	5,748	191,628					
Turnout			45.51%	34.20%	26.33%	34.81%	44.80%					

The following candidates were elected: Enrique Lee (PRI), 7,320 votes; Luis Malla (PL), 2,689 votes; and Vlado Mirosevic (PL), 16,819 votes.

==== 2017 ====
Results of the 2017 general election held on 19 November 2017:

Party		Pact	Party							Pact		
Party		Pact	Votes per commune				Total votes	%	Seats	Votes	%	Seats
Party		Pact	Arica	Cama- rones	General Lagos	Putre	Total votes	%	Seats	Votes	%	Seats
Liberal Party of Chile	PL	Broad Front	25,205	386	103	363	26,057	36.60%	1	27,333	38.39%	1
Humanist Party	PH	Broad Front	896	12	6	13	927	1.30%	0	27,333	38.39%	1
Equality Party	IGUAL	Broad Front	325	7	5	12	349	0.49%	0	27,333	38.39%	1
Socialist Party of Chile	PS	Nueva Mayoría	11,039	196	88	258	11,581	16.27%	1	15,957	22.41%	1
Communist Party of Chile	PC	Nueva Mayoría	2,545	34	13	38	2,630	3.69%	0	15,957	22.41%	1
Party for Democracy	PPD	Nueva Mayoría	1,129	93	87	437	1,746	2.45%	0	15,957	22.41%	1
Independent Democratic Union	UDI	Chile Vamos	8,826	132	58	256	9,272	13.02%	1	15,164	21.30%	1
Evópoli	EVO	Chile Vamos	3,263	26	13	64	3,366	4.73%	0	15,164	21.30%	1
National Renewal	RN	Chile Vamos	1,636	22	52	96	1,806	2.54%	0	15,164	21.30%	1
Independent Regionalist Party	PRI	Chile Vamos	676	9	10	25	720	1.01%	0	15,164	21.30%	1
Progressive Party	PRO	All Over Chile	9,977	109	49	193	10,328	14.51%	0	10,328	14.51%	0
Christian Democratic Party	PDC	Democratic Convergence	2,232	60	59	65	2,416	3.39%	0	2,416	3.39%	0
Valid votes			67,749	1,086	543	1,820	71,198	100.00%	3	71,198	100.00%	3
Blank votes			1,581	34	34	83	1,732	2.31%				
Rejected votes – other			1,817	22	18	60	1,917	2.56%				
Total polled			71,147	1,142	595	1,963	74,847	40.44%				
Registered electors			172,372	4,023	2,421	6,246	185,062					
Turnout			41.28%	28.39%	24.58%	31.43%	40.44%					

The following candidates were elected: Nino Baltolu (UDI), 9,272 votes; Vlado Mirosevic (PL), 24,273 votes; and Luis Rocafull (PS), 6,430 votes.
