= Víctor Pino =

Chilean politician (born 1974)

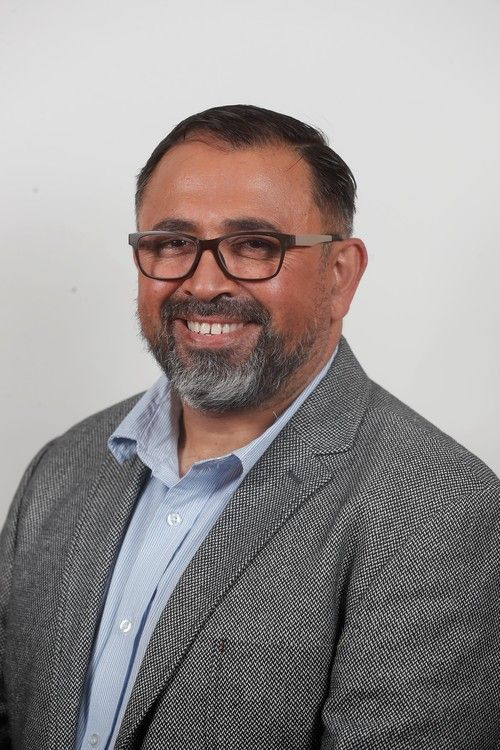

Member of the Chamber of Deputies
- In office 11 March 2022 – 11 March 2026
- Constituency: District 5

Personal details
- Born: 8 December 1974 (age 51) Santiago, Chile
- Other political affiliations: Democrats (2022–2025); Party of the People (2021–2022); Avancemos Chile (2023–2024)
- Spouse: Rosa Santibáñez
- Children: Four
- Parent(s): Víctor Pino; Irene Fuentes
- Education: University of Antofagasta; Central University of Chile (B.Sc)
- Occupation: Politician

Víctor Alejandro Pino Fuentes (born 8 December 1974) is a Chilean politician who serves as deputy.

== Family and early life ==
He was born in Santiago on 8 December 1974, the son of Víctor Pino Zamora and Irene Fuentes Venegas. He is married to Rosa Santibáñez Andrade and is the father of four children.

== Professional life ==
He completed his primary and secondary education at Eagle School in Antofagasta and at Liceo Rosa Tocornal in Puente Alto, graduating in 1991.

He pursued higher education at the University of Antofagasta and the Central University of Chile. At the former, he studied business administration between 1999 and 2002, and at the latter he completed a degree in business administration, graduating in 2020.

He has completed several postgraduate diplomas, including human resources management and personnel administration at CED–Catholic University of the North (2002); business management at the Pedro de Valdivia University (2011); negotiation (2016–2017); and executive leadership (2018–2019) at the Pontifical Catholic University of Chile. Since 2022, he has been pursuing an MBA in business administration at the European Business School of Barcelona (ENEB).

Professionally, he has worked as general manager of VPF Servicios (2000–2013); as LATAM account manager responsible for system implementation in client fleets at Inthinc Technology Solutions (Orbcomm) between 2013 and 2017; and subsequently as key account manager at the same company from 2017 to 2020. Since 2020, he has served as general manager of VPF Servicios SpA in La Serena.

== Political career ==
Between 2002 and 2021, he carried out public service activities as a bishop and councillor of the Church of Jesus Christ of Latter-day Saints community in Antofagasta. He is considered the first member of that church to hold a seat in the Chamber of Deputies of Chile.

He began his political career as a member of the Party of the People (PDG), founded by former presidential candidate Franco Parisi.

In August 2021, he registered his candidacy for the Chamber of Deputies representing the Party of the People in the 5th electoral district of the Coquimbo Region, comprising the communes of Andacollo, Canela, Combarbalá, Coquimbo, Illapel, La Higuera, La Serena, Los Vilos, Monte Patria, Ovalle, Paiguano, Punitaqui, Río Hurtado, Salamanca and Vicuña. He was elected in the November 2021 election with 9,275 votes, representing 3.92% of the valid votes cast.

On 13 December 2022, he ceased his membership in the Party of the People, and on 14 May 2024 he announced his affiliation with the Democrats party.

He sought re-election in the same district in the 16 November 2025 parliamentary elections, representing the Democrats within the Chile Grande y Unido pact. He was not elected, obtaining 2,727 votes, equivalent to 0.61% of the valid votes cast.
