= Pablo Chacón Cancino =

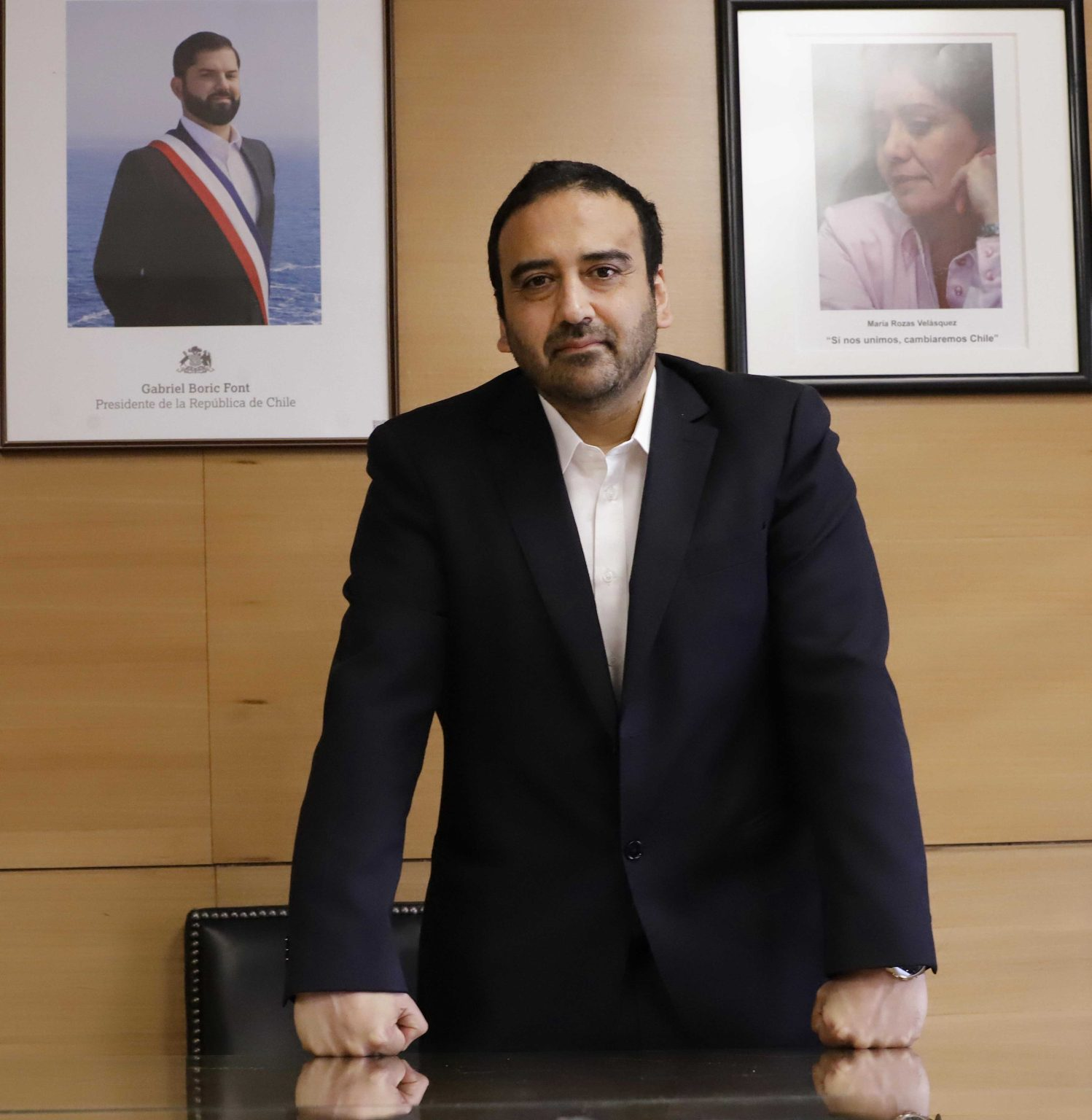
- Pablo Chacón as Undersecretary of Labor

Undersecretary of Labor of Chile
- Incumbent
- Assumed office April 21, 2025
- President: Gabriel Boric
- Preceded by: Giorgio Boccardo

Secretary General of the University of Santiago de Chile Student Federation
- In office 2003–2004
- President: Jaime Romero Álvarez

Personal details
- Born: January 11, 1975 (age 51) Santiago, Santiago Metropolitan Region, Chile
- Party: Communist Party of Chile (since 1989)
- Education: University of Arts and Social Sciences (Master's in Sociology)
- Alma mater: University of Santiago, Chile
- Occupation: Geomatics engineer

Pablo Chacón Cancino (born January 11, 1975, in Santiago, Chile) is a Chilean geomatics engineer, sociologist, and politician, affiliated with the Communist Party of Chile (PCCh) since 1989. Since April 21, 2025, he has served as Undersecretary of Labor of Chile in the administration of President Gabriel Boric.

== Biography ==
He pursued his higher education at the University of Santiago, Chile (USACH), where he earned a degree in Geomatics Engineering and a bachelor's degree in Applied Engineering. He later completed a master's degree in sociology at the University of Arts and Social Sciences (UARCIS). During his university years, he served as Secretary-General of the University of Santiago de Chile Student Federation in 2003. He has been involved in political activity since his youth, joining the Communist Party of Chile in 1989.

== Professional career ==
His professional career has focused on labor and social policy, both within government institutions and in organizations linked to progressive thought.

In 2014, he joined the technical team of the Undersecretariat of Social Welfare during the first presidency of Michelle Bachelet. In that role, he participated in the citizen dialogue process led by the Presidential Advisory Commission on the pension system and contributed to the participatory development of the National Policy on Occupational Health and Safety, in accordance with Convention No. 187 of the International Labour Organization (ILO), ratified by Chile in 2011.

Between 2016 and 2018, during Bachelet's second presidency, he served as chief of staff at the Undersecretariat of Social Welfare. During that time, he also worked as a legislative advisor in the National Congress and collaborated with the Municipality of Santiago on public policy initiatives related to social and environmental issues.

In 2019, during the mayoralty of Manuel Marcarián (Communist Party) in the municipality of Los Vilos, Chacón served as municipal administrator. Following a stroke suffered by the sitting mayor, Chacón assumed the role of acting mayor. However, his tenure was cut short after four months when the municipal council voted to remove him. According to the outlet *Los Vilos Chile*, councilors accused him of repeatedly ignoring their requests and criticized the widespread hiring of staff from outside the commune. Chacón, for his part, claimed that his dismissal was politically motivated, aiming to weaken Marcarián's administration for electoral reasons.

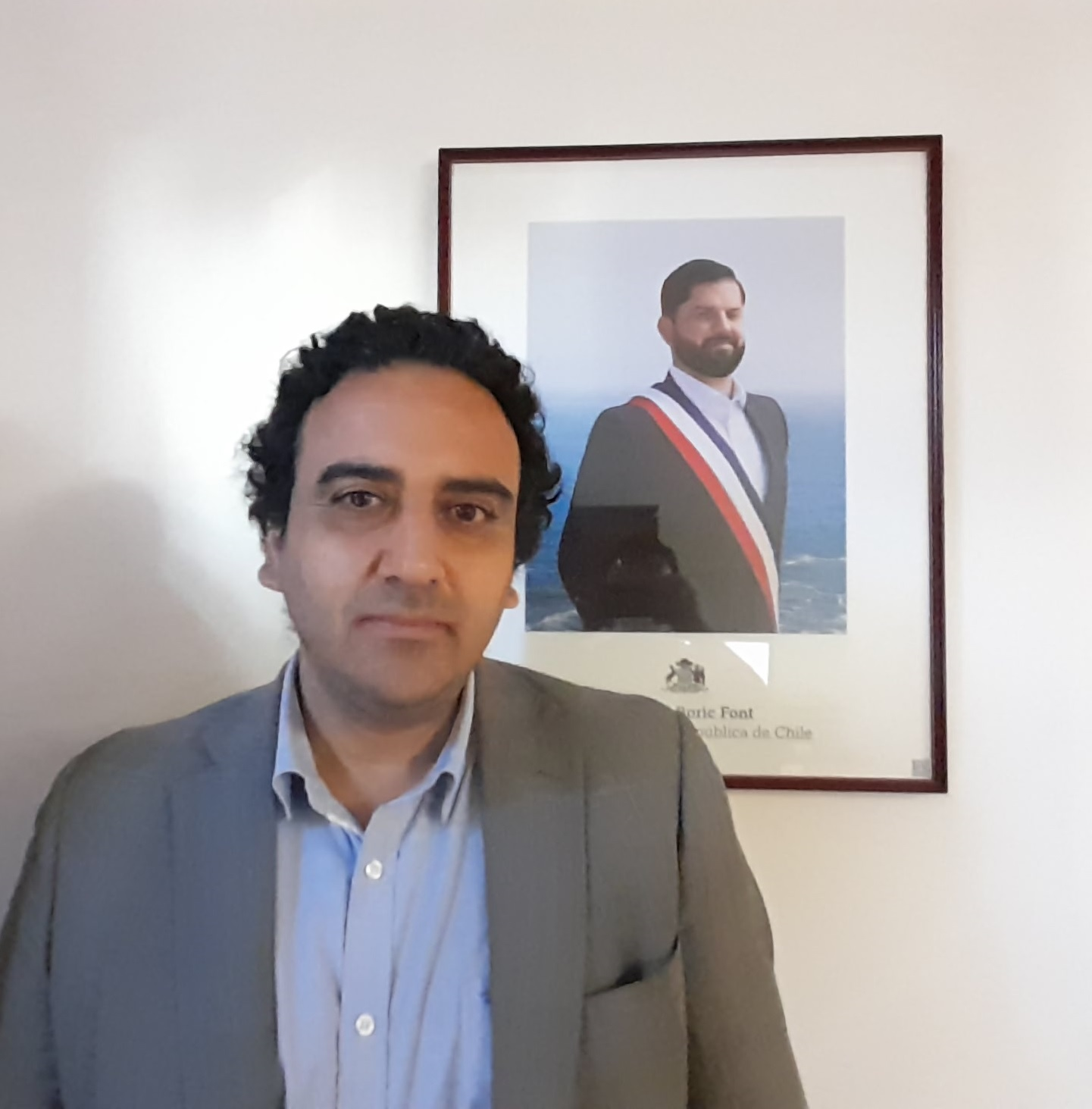
Pablo Chacón as Head of the Department of Social Dialogue at the Ministry of Labor and Social Welfare.

In 2022, he was appointed head of the Department of Social Dialogue at the Ministry of Labor and Social Welfare (Chile). He later served as chief of staff at the ministry from 2022 to 2024. In 2024, he was appointed Chile's labor attaché to the International Labour Organization (ILO) in Geneva, representing the country's labor interests in a diplomatic capacity.

He has also served as coordinator of the working group "Global Environmental Change, Social Movements and Public Policy" of the Latin American Council of Social Sciences (CLACSO), focusing on environmental justice issues. Additionally, he has overseen the environmental division of the Alejandro Lipschutz Institute of Sciences (ICAL), a think tank linked to the Communist Party.

=== Undersecretary of State ===
On April 21, 2025, he was appointed Undersecretary of Labor of Chile by President Gabriel Boric, replacing Giorgio Boccardo, who became Minister of Labor and Social Welfare.

Since taking office, he has led major reforms in labor policy. Key initiatives include promoting legislation to reduce the standard workweek to 40 hours, gradually increasing the minimum wage, and modernizing the labor inspection system. He also pushed for the ratification of International Labour Organization (ILO) Conventions 155, 176, and 190, concerning occupational health and safety, safety in mining operations, and the prevention of violence and harassment in the workplace.

In June 2025, he represented Chile at the 113th International Labour Conference in Geneva, where he presented the country's recent legislative advances on social protection and formal employment. In his speech, he emphasized the historic increase of the minimum wage, the 40-hour workweek law, and the pension reform proposal. He argued that these policies will help strengthen labor formalization in the medium and long term. He also reiterated the Boric administration's commitment to decent work, the strengthening of social dialogue, and tripartism, highlighting Chile's ratification of all core ILO conventions, including Conventions 155, 176, and 190. Additionally, he introduced the National Strategy for Transition to Formality, developed with technical support from the ILO, which is based on empirical evidence and promotes innovative and sustainable approaches. Finally, he announced an upcoming bill to redesign employment subsidies, focusing on integration, simplification, and efficiency.
