= Enrique Lee =

Chilean politician (born 1967)

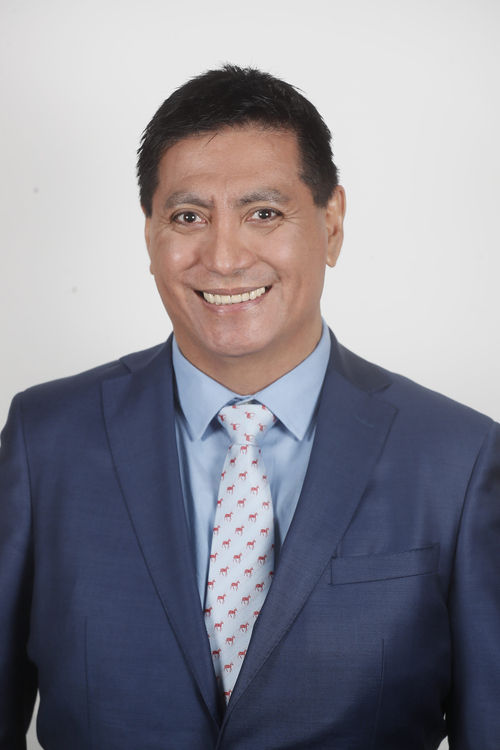

Member of the Senate
- Incumbent
- Assumed office 11 March 2026

Member of the Chamber of Deputies
- In office 11 March 2022 – 11 March 2026
- Preceded by: Creation of the District
- Constituency: District 1

Personal details
- Born: 16 December 1967 (age 58) Arica, Chile
- Party: Avancemos Chile (2023-2024)
- Children: Two
- Education: University of Concepción; University of La Frontera; Pontifical Catholic University of São Paulo
- Occupation: Politician
- Profession: Physician

Enrique Segundo Lee Flores (Arica, December 16, 1967) is a surgeon with specialization in plastic surgery and Chilean politician.

== Biography ==
He is the son of Eduardo Lee Vásquez, of Sino-Chilean origin, and Oriela Flores Cuellar. He is a General Physician from the University of Concepción, with a master's degree in medical sciences with a mention in Surgery from the University of La Frontera. In 1997 he received a scholarship from the Pontifical Catholic University of São Paulo to pursue a formal specialization in Plastic Surgery. Since 1994 he worked in the Emergency and Surgery Service of the Dr. Juan Noé Hospital in Arica, until 2004 when he resigned to practice his profession privately. He is currently Director of Artemed, a specialty Medical Center, dedicated to Regenerative Medicine and Cellular Therapy.

He is also dedicated to academic work at the University of Tarapacá and the Chilean Security Association.

== Political career ==
His political career began in 2013, when he was an independent candidate for deputy for district 1 in the parliamentary elections of that year, an occasion where he obtained about 6% of the votes without being elected.

His career continued in 2017, when he was a candidate for senator for the Arica and Parinacota Region in the 2017 parliamentary elections, where he obtained the first majority but was not elected because he was an independent candidate, and due to the new proportional electoral system established in Chile for the first time, the D'Hondt System.

In 2021 he announced his candidacy for the governorship of the Arica and Parinacota Region, in the 2021 regional governor elections, where he was not elected. He was a candidate for deputy as an independent, in a seat of the Independent Democratic Regionalist Party, in the 2021 parliamentary elections for District 1, being elected with the second majority.

On March 11, 2022, he assumes the position of deputy of the Republic. He is a member of the permanent commissions of Future, Sciences, Technology, Knowledge and Innovation; and Extreme Zones and Chilean Antarctica. After the legal dissolution of the PRI, he joined the Evópoli bench, but in May 2022 he was expelled from it, after having signed a constitutional accusation against the former chancellor, Andrés Allamand. In July 2022 he joined the People's Party bench.
