= Virginia Cox Balmaceda =

Chilean journalist and writer

- Born: 29 August 1905; Chile
- Died: 2 October 2002 (aged 97); Chile
- Occupation(s): Journalist, writer
- Years active: 1954–1982
- Spouse: Agustín Huneeus
- Children: Pablo, Virginia, Francisco, Agustín, Cecilia, Teresa

Virginia Cox Balmaceda (29 August 1905 – 2 October 2002) was a Chilean journalist and writer of novels and short stories. She was also the mother of writer Pablo Huneeus.

In the opinion of writer Virginia Vidal, she

is considered one of the precursors that anticipated in critical attitude, disposition to denounce, expression of rebellion, protest of everything that subjugates the woman by her condition as such. Much later, a large number of writers, mostly within the space of the workshops of the eighties, were developing a statement of repudiation of the state of things, inertia, and so-called established "values".

She was a participant in the series of conferences organized by the Friends of the Book Association in 1977 at the Benjamín Vicuña Mackenna National Museum called "Who's Who in Chilean Literature?".

== Works ==
- Desvelo impaciente (Ediciones Ercilla, 1951)
- Los muñecos no sangran (Zig-Zag, 1969; Ediciones Universitarias de Valparaíso, 1973)
- Dentro y fuera de mi maleta: andanzas por el mundo (Renacimiento, 1980)
- ¿Quién soy? (Agrupación Amigos del Libro, 1980)
- La antimadre (Aconcagua, 1982)
- Los muñecos no sangran (Cuatro Vientos, 1989)
