= Yovana Ahumada =

Chilean politician

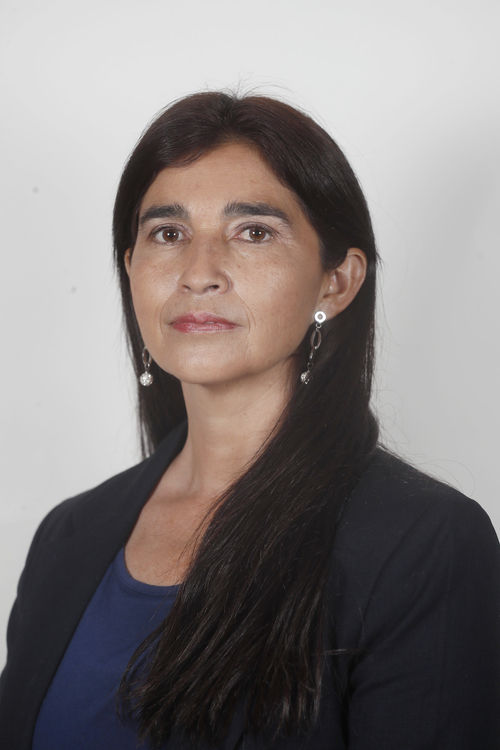

Member of the Chamber of Deputies of Chile
- Incumbent
- Assumed office 11 March 2022
- Constituency: District 3

Personal details
- Born: 24 February 1973 (age 53) Antofagasta, Chile
- Party: PSC (since 2024)
- Other party: PDG (2021–2022); Independent (2022–2024); Democrats (2024)

Yovana Alejandra Ahumada Palma (born 24 February 1973) is a Chilean politician who serves as deputy.

== Biography ==
She was born on 24 February 1973. She is the daughter of Roberto Ahumada Manchot and Mónica Palma Vergara.

She is single and the mother of four daughters.

She completed her primary education at Escuela D-91, then attended Colegio Antofagasta, and completed her secondary education at Liceo de Niñas in the same city. She graduated from Liceo Nobelius in Punta Arenas in 1990.

In her professional career, she worked as a sales agent for insurance and intangible products, and since 2019 has worked in the sanitation and cleaning services sector.

== Political career ==
She began her political trajectory after becoming acquainted with the “Movement of the People” in 2019. The following year, she participated in the founding of the Party of the People (PDG), led by former presidential candidate Franco Parisi, serving as a national vice president of the party.

In August 2021, she registered her candidacy for the Chamber of Deputies of Chile representing the Party of the People in the 3rd District—comprising the communes of Antofagasta, Calama, María Elena, Mejillones, Ollagüe, San Pedro de Atacama, Sierra Gorda, Taltal, and Tocopilla—in the Antofagasta Region. She was elected with 11,892 votes, corresponding to 6.53% of the valid votes cast.

On 13 December 2022, she ceased to be a member of the Party of the People. She joined the Social Christian Party on 5 November 2024.

She ran for re-election in the same district in the elections of 16 November 2025, representing the Social Christian Party within the Cambio por Chile pact. She was not elected, obtaining 8,758 votes, equivalent to 2.75% of the total votes cast.
