= Sergio Jara Román =

Chilean journalist

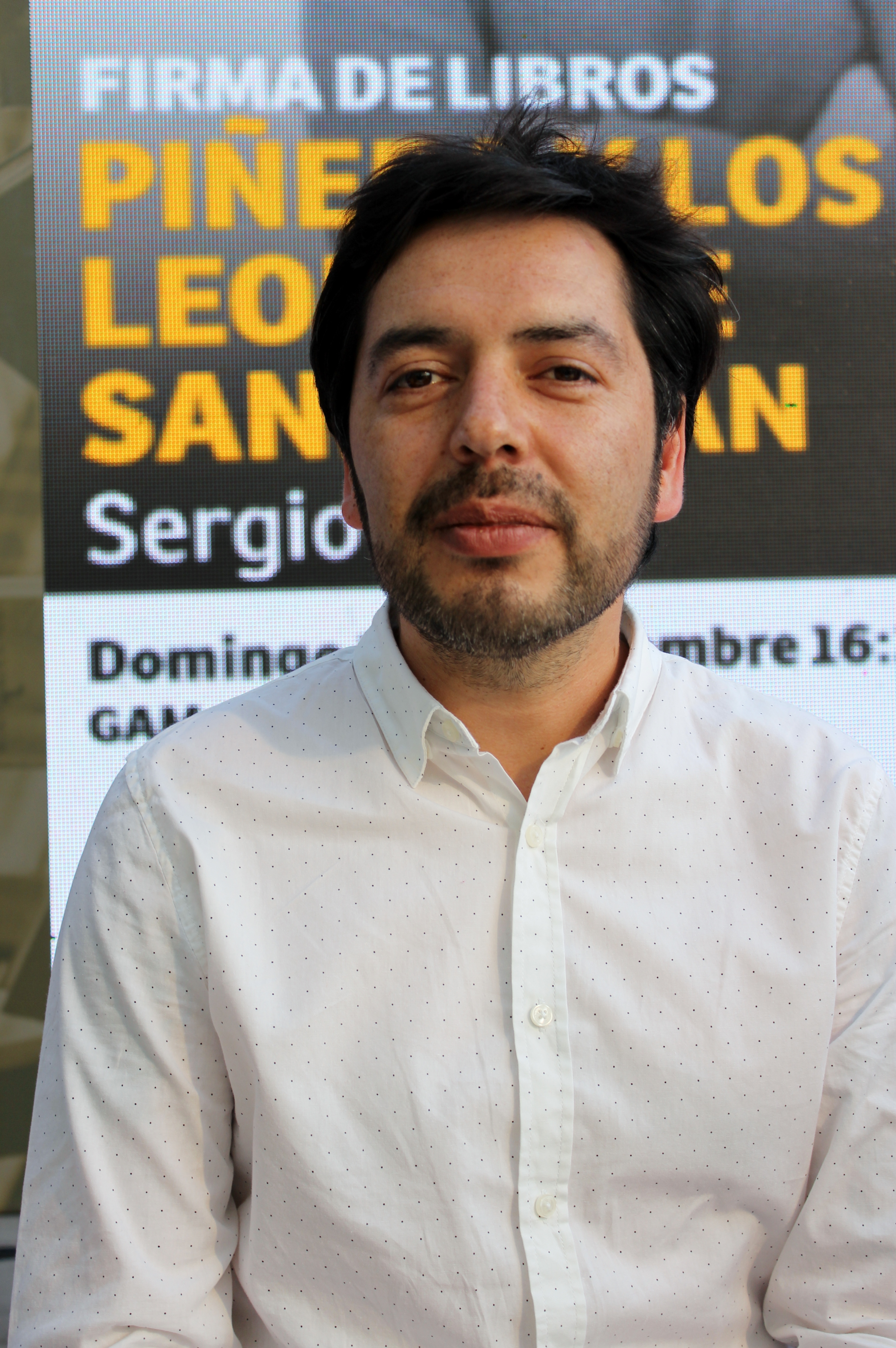

Personal details
- Born: 31 March 1981 (age 45) Conchalí, Chile
- Education: Playa Ancha University (BA)
- Occupation: Writer editor
- Profession: Journalist

Sergio Jara Román (born 31 March 1981) is a Chilean journalist and non-fiction writer.

In 2018, he published the book «Piñera y los leones de Sanhattan» ―(Sebastián) Piñera and the lions of Sanhattan―. There, he portrayed how the Chilean economic elite was formed under the scheme of the free market reforms promoted in the early 1980s by Augusto Pinochet's regime.

In 2021, Jara Román gained some notoriety when the Pandora Papers involved to the now President Piñera. Related to that, he was interviewed in different programs to complement the background of Piñera's interests and behavior. Likewise, he was invited by the commission charged to impeach Piñera in the Chamber of Deputies.

== Biography ==
In 2001, Jara Román entered to study journalism at the Playa Ancha University, from which he graduated in 2005. His first journalistic jobs took place at Terra Networks, where he wrote about economics and business for other five years. Later, in 2010 he became a Technology Editor at AméricaEconomía, where he worked two years. In 2012, he started working at El Mercurio, serving as journalistic editor of the investments report. In 2014, he joined to La Tercera, where he held the role of Business Sub-editor until 2016.

In 2015, he finished a PgD in investigative journalism at the University of Chile. In 2017 he completed a diploma in non-fiction narrative writing at the Alberto Hurtado University. Similarly, then he worked teaching lessons in both universities as well as in the University for Development.

== Works ==
- Piñera y los leones de Sanhattan (2018).
- Joyitas, los protagonistas de los mayores escándalos de corrupción en Chile (2021); Co-edited with various authors.
