= Sebastián Videla =

Chilean politician (born 1986)

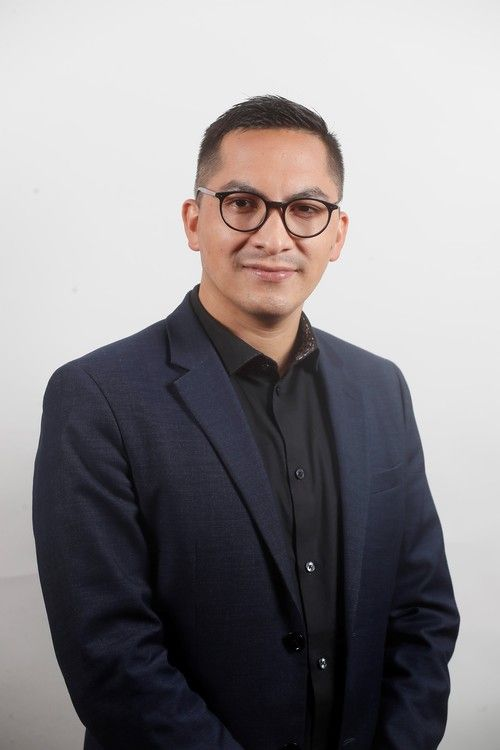

Member of the Chamber of Deputies
- Incumbent
- Assumed office 11 March 2022
- Constituency: 3rd District

Personal details
- Born: 29 April 1986 (age 40) Antofagasta, Chile
- Party: Ind. pro Liberal Party (2021–)
- Education: Pontifical Catholic University of Valparaíso
- Occupation: Politician
- Profession: Actor

Sebastián Patricio Videla Castillo (born 29 April 1986) is a Chilean politician who currently serves as deputy in the Congress of Chile.

== Biography ==
He was born in Antofagasta on 29 April 1986. He is the son of Eduardo Videla Arenas and Rosa Castillo Parra.

He completed his secondary education at the Adventist School of Antofagasta, graduating in 2004. He later studied acting and completed a Diploma in Cultural Management at the Pontifical Catholic University of Valparaíso (PUCV).

Professionally, he has worked as a social communicator in radio, television, and digital media. In 2017, he moved to Mexico to undertake a professional specialization with media professionals from TV Azteca, and participated in projects with Televisa and Tv Urban. Upon returning to Chile, he worked at Chilevisión. He later returned to his hometown, where he worked at «Antofagasta TV» and hosted the program Voz Ciudadana.

== Political career ==
His public trajectory developed primarily through his work as a social communicator, highlighting and channeling the demands of the community of Antofagasta through various digital platforms. He became popularly known as “Ciudadano Videla.”

He began his political career in 2012 as an independent candidate for the Municipal Council of Antofagasta on the list Chile está en otra, without being elected. Between 2012 and 2015, he served as communications advisor to former mayor Karen Rojo and also acted as coordinator of the municipality’s Youth Office.

In December 2020, he launched a campaign to collect signatures to present an independent candidacy for Mayor of Antofagasta. In the municipal elections held on 15 and 16 May 2021, he obtained 17,294 votes, equivalent to 16.75% of the valid votes cast, and was not elected.

In August 2021, he presented his candidacy for the Chamber of Deputies of Chile as an independent candidate within the Nuevo Pacto Social list, running under a quota of the Liberal Party of Chile for the 3rd District of the Antofagasta Region—comprising the communes of Antofagasta, Calama, María Elena, Mejillones, Ollagüe, San Pedro de Atacama, Sierra Gorda, Taltal, and Tocopilla. He was elected with 12,266 votes, corresponding to 6.73% of the valid votes cast.
