= Luis Malla =

Chilean politician (born 1992)

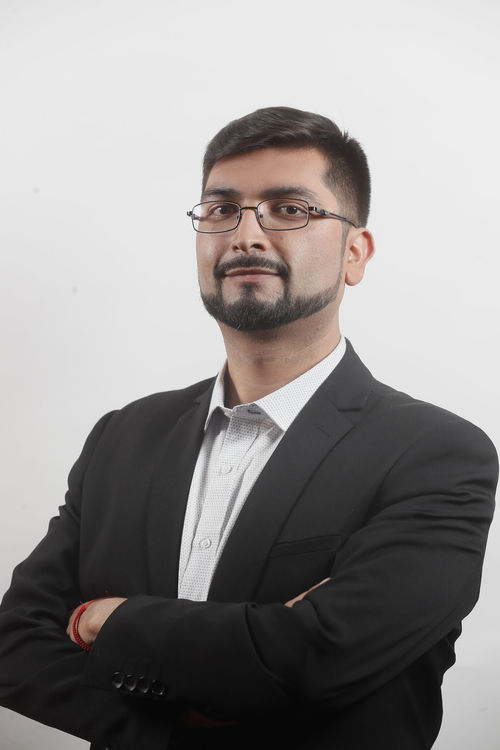

Member of the Chamber of Deputies
- Incumbent
- Assumed office 11 March 2022
- Constituency: District 1

Councilman of Arica
- In office 6 December 2016 – 20 November 2020

Personal details
- Born: 16 May 1992 (age 33) Ovalle, Chile
- Party: Liberal
- Occupation: Politician

Luis Fabián Malla Valenzuela (born 16 May 1992) is a Chilean politician who is part of the Chamber of Deputies of Chile.

== Biography ==
Malla was born in Ovalle on 16 May 1992. He is the son of Amanda Valenzuela Robles.

He completed his primary education at Escuela Básica Vado de Topater in Calama and at Liceo Domingo Santa María in Arica. He pursued his secondary education at Liceo Santo Domingo in Arica, graduating in 2009. He later studied Business Administration Engineering at the Universidad Tecnológica de Chile (INACAP), Arica campus, obtaining his professional degree in 2015.

From an early age, Malla has been active in the cultural and social sphere. Since the age of 15, he has worked as a singer, event host, and promoter of social initiatives, as well as a facilitator of leadership workshops, combining artistic activity with community engagement.

== Political career ==
Malla began his political trajectory in Arica as a social leader, focusing on youth participation and cultural initiatives as tools for social transformation.

He served as a regional youth councillor for the Arica and Parinacota Region and promoted artistic and cultural activities aimed at youth development. He was president of the Association of Young Artists of Chile (AJA) and founder and president of the Binational Youth Council (Arica–Tacna).

In the 2016 municipal election, he ran as an independent candidate for the municipal council of Arica within the Democratic Alternative electoral pact. He obtained 1,308 votes (15.68%) and was elected as the youngest municipal councillor in the commune. He resigned from the position on 20 November 2020.

In the November 2021 parliamentary elections, Malla ran for the Chamber of Deputies representing the Liberal Party (PL) in the 1st electoral district of the Arica and Parinacota Region, for the 2022–2026 term. He was elected with 2,689 votes, corresponding to 3.34% of the valid votes cast.
