= Irene Valenzuela =

Spanish physicist

Irene Valenzuela Agüí is a Spanish theoretical physicist whose research concerns the swampland program and dark dimension scenario of string theory and quantum gravity. She is a staff member at CERN in Geneva, Switzerland, and a Ramon y Cajal researcher at the Autonomous University of Madrid.

== Education and career ==
Valenzuela studied physics at the Autonomous University of Madrid, where she received her undergraduate degree in 2011 and a master's degree in 2013, and completed her Ph.D. in 2015. Her dissertation, The Higgs sector, SUSY breaking and Inflation in String Theory, was supervised by Luis Enrique Ibáñez.

She was a postdoctoral researcher at the Max Planck Institute for Physics in Munich, Germany from 2015 to 2017, at Utrecht University in the Netherlands from 2017 to 2018, at Cornell University in the United States from 2018 to 2019, and at Harvard University in the United States from 2019 to 2021. She became a Ramon y Cajal researcher at the Autonomous University of Madrid, and took a leave from her position in Madrid to become a staff member at CERN in 2022.

== Recognition ==
Valenzuela was the 2021 recipient of the Young Researcher in Theoretical Physics award of the Spanish Royal Physics Society and BBVA Foundation. She was elected to the Young Academy of Spain in 2022. She was the 2023 recipient of the award for young women scientists in physics and chemistry of the Fundación Real Academia de las Ciencias.
