= Pablo Huneeus =

Chilean writer and sociologist

Pablo Cox
- Born: Pablo Miguel Huneeus Cox; 1940 (age 85–86); Santiago, Chile
- Education: Ph.D. from University of Paris (Sorbonne)
- Occupations: Writer, Social critic
- Parent: Virginia Cox Balmaceda (mother)
- Website: Official Website

Pablo Miguel Huneeus Cox (born 1940 in Santiago) raised in New Jersey, is a Chilean writer and social critic. His more than thirty books are known for their lively personal style, sense of humor, and vivid portraits of real people. Several have been bestsellers.

Cox is the son of Chilean journalist and writer Virginia Cox Balmaceda. Trained as a sociologist, he received his doctorate from the University of Paris (Sorbonne). Huneeus has worked as a consultant for United Nations in Geneva (Switzerland), as a researcher for ECLA (Economic Commission for Latin America) in Santiago, and as professor of industrial sociology at the Engineering Faculty of the University of Chile. He was the founding director of Chile's National Employment Service (SENCE). Due to his concern for freedom of speech, he launched the MUAC Movimiento Universal Anti Censura (Universal Anti Censorship Movement).

Huneeus is a frequent contributor as a columnist to several of Chile's newspapers and has been foreign correspondent for The Economist in London and for The Wall Street Journal. He is often guest on Chilean television talk shows and has hosted his own show.

In order to defend authors' rights as avowed by the Berne Convention for the Protection of Literary and Artistic Works, he copyrighted on behalf of José Ricardo Ojeda, the miner who penned on August 22 the now celebrated announcement. The Times (October 22, 2010) acclaims this as “the most famous sentence in the world this year.”

“The six words and one number” goes on to say the British newspaper, “have been replicated on T-shirts, flags and mugs. It has been presented to presidents, prime ministers and even the Queen. It was the sentence written on a scrap of paper, put in a plastic bag and attached to the drill that — 69 days after they went missing — reached the miners trapped half a mile beneath northern Chile’s Atacama desert. “Estamos bien en el refugio los 33,” it read. “We are well in the refuge — the 33”

== Works ==
- L'Expert International: Son rôle dans le changement social. École Pratique des Hautes Études, Sciences Économiques et Sociales, Université de Paris, 1969.
- El problema de empleo y recursos humanos. Editorial Andrés Bello, 1970.
- Los burócratas, un nuevo análisis del Estado. Nova Terra, Barcelona, 1974.
- Chile: El costo social de la dependencia ideológica. (con otros autores) Editorial del Pacífico, Santiago, 1973.
- Chile 2010: una utopía posible.(con otros autores) Editorial Universitaria, 1976.
- Nuestra mentalidad económica. Nueva Generación, Santiago, 1979.
- Lo comido y lo bailado. Ensayos libres sobre la vida misma. Santiago, Nueva Generación, 1980.
- Qué te pasó Pablo? Nueva Generación, Santiago, 1981.
- La cultura huachaca, o el aporte de la televisión. Nueva Generación, 1982.
- ¿Por qué te llevaste mi peineta amarilla y me dejaste solo en París? Nueva Generación, Santiago y Buenos Aires, 1982.
- Lo impensable, informe sobre la amenaza nuclear. Nueva Generación, 1983.
- Aristotelia chilensis. Nueva Generación, Santiago, 1984.
- En aquel tiempo, historia de un chileno durante Allende. Nueva Generación, Santiago, 1985.
- A piel viva. Nueva Generación, Santiago, 1986.
- Amor en alta mar. Nueva Generación, Santiago, 1987.
- El íntimo femenino, estudios sobre la mujer. Nueva Generación, 1988.
- Manual básico de cocina. Nueva Generación, Santiago, 1989.
- En defensa de los senos (Crónicas ecológicas). Nueva Generación, 1990.
- Andanzas por Rusia. Nueva Generación, Santiago, 1994.
- Juan Pedrals, un hombre aparte (Breve historia del petróleo) EU, 1996.
- Hernando de Magallanes: historia de la primera vuelta al mundo (traducción). Nueva Generación, 1996. Versión en inglés y en castellano.
- Versión completa en lenguaje actual de La Araucana de Alonso de Ercilla, Nueva Generación, Santiago, 1996.
- A todo trapo. Homenaje a la navegación a vela. Nueva Generación, 1996.
- Jaque al rey. Ensayos de transición. Nueva Generación, Santiago, 1996.
- Perro con corbata, nadie lo mata. Dichos de campo. Nueva Generación, 1997.
- El Desierto en Flor. Nueva Generación, Santiago, 1997.
- Las Cartas de Don Pedro de Valdivia. Nueva Generación, Santiago, 1998.
- Filosofía Clásica (15 lecciones). Nueva Generación, Santiago, 1999.
- Patagonia Mágica, el viaje del Tata Guillermo. Nueva Generación, 1999.
- La Vida en Amarillo (Estudio del empresarismo chileno) Publiguías, 2000.
- El Dedo en la Llaga. Santiago, Nueva Generación, 2001.
- Patagonia: Selected Writings (Bilingual Anthology), Nueva Generación, 2002.
