= María José Zaldívar =

Chilean lawyer and politician

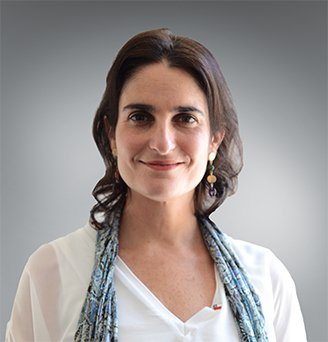

Minister of Labour and Social Welfare
- In office 28 October 2019 – 7 April 2021
- President: Sebastián Piñera
- Preceded by: Nicolás Monckeberg
- Succeeded by: Patricio Melero

Chief Executive Officer of the Teletón Foundation
- Incumbent
- Assumed office November 2024

Personal details
- Born: 16 September 1975 (age 51) Santiago, Chile
- Spouse: Stefan Franken
- Children: Four
- Education: Pontifical Catholic University of Chile (LL.B)
- Profession: Lawyer

María José Zaldívar Larraín (born 16 September 1975) is a Chilean lawyer and politician who served as the Minister of Labour and Social Welfare in the second government of Sebastián Piñera.

Zaldívar holds a law degree from the Pontifical Catholic University of Chile and previously served as Superintendent of Social Security and as general manager of the Social Security Research, Studies and Development Corporation.

She later became Chile's minister of labour and social security in 2019. She also served as president of the Chilean Supermarket Association and as a board member of the ChileMujeres Foundation.

She is the chief executive officer of the Teletón Foundation since November 2024.

Zaldívar was included in Forbes Chile’s list of the "50 Most Influential Women in Chile in 2025".

== Biography ==
She is the daughter of Adolfo Zaldívar (1943–2013), a former senator and member of both the Christian Democratic Party (PDC) and the Regionalist Party of the Independents (PRI).

She is a lawyer, holding a law degree from the Pontifical Catholic University of Chile (PUC), as well as a degree in history. She also earned a master's degree in public law from the Pontifical Catholic University of Chile.

She is married and has four children.

== Political career ==
Beginning in 2005, she served as reporting attorney (2005), legal counsel (2006–2010), and Superintendent of Social Security until May 2014.

From 2014 to 2018, she was general manager of the Corporation for Research, Studies and Development of Social Security (CIEDESS). Immediately prior to her appointment as minister, she served as undersecretary of social security.

At the Pontifical Catholic University of Chile, she taught the course "Welfare Systems" and, from 2014 onward, served as a lecturer in the Department of Labour Law. At the Andrés Bello University, she taught "Logic and Language" and "General Sources of Law", while at the University of Development, she taught courses in social security and labour law.

On 28 October 2019, President Sebastián Piñera appointed her Minister of Labour and Social Welfare. She remained in office until April 2021, when she was succeeded by Patricio Melero.
