= Alondra Carrillo =

Chilean constituent

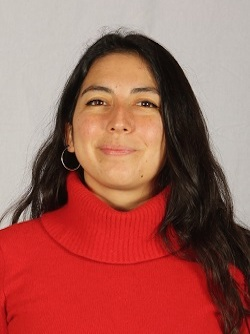

Member of the Constitutional Convention
- In office 4 July 2021 – 4 July 2022
- Constituency: 12th District

Personal details
- Born: 23 June 1991 (age 35) Santiago, Chile
- Party: None
- Education: Pontifical Catholic University of Chile (B.Sc)
- Profession: Psychologist

Alondra Carrillo Vidal (born 23 June 1991) is a Chilean feminist psychologist, and independent politician.

She served as a member of the Constitutional Convention between 2021 and 2022, representing the 12th District of the Santiago Metropolitan Region.

== Early life and education ==
Carrillo was born on 23 June 1991 in Santiago, Chile. She is the daughter of Juan Carlos Carrillo Martínez and María Josefina Vidal Baeza.

She completed her primary education at Colegio Playground in La Florida and her secondary education at Colegio Latinoamericano, graduating in 2009.

She later studied psychology at the Pontifical Catholic University of Chile, where she earned her degree with a specialization in clinical psychology. She also completed a diploma in editing and publishing at the same institution.

== Professional career ==
Since 2014, Carrillo has served as a teaching assistant at the School of Psychology of the Pontifical Catholic University of Chile, in courses including psychoanalysis, personality and identity, affectivity and emotion, and models of health and illness.

From 2017 onward, she has worked as a clinical psychology intern at the Psychological Care Center of the University of Chile.

== Political career ==
Carrillo is an independent politician. She participated in the Chilean student movements of 2006 and was involved in the political platform Crecer at the Pontifical Catholic University of Chile in 2010. She is a member of the Coordinadora Feminista 8M, an organization in which she served as spokesperson for two years.

In the elections held on 15–16 May 2021, she ran as an independent candidate for the Constitutional Convention representing the 12th District of the Santiago Metropolitan Region, as part of the Voces Constituyentes pact. She was elected with 22,986 votes, corresponding to 6.18% of the valid votes cast.
