= María Soledad Cisternas =

Chilean lawyer and activist

María Soledad Cisternas Reyes
- Born: November 4, 1959 (age 66); Santiago, Chile
- Education: Pontifical Catholic University of Chile
- Occupations: Lawyer, disability rights activist
- Known for: Work on the Convention on the Rights of Persons with Disabilities; UN Special Envoy on Disability and Accessibility
- Notable work: Drafting of the Convention on the Rights of Persons with Disabilities
- Awards: National Prize of Human Rights (Chile) (2014)

María Soledad Cisternas Reyes (born November 4, 1959) is a Chilean lawyer and disability rights activist. Cisternas, who became blind while she was in college has worked to increase access for people with disabilities in Chile and at the United Nations (UN). She was on the committee that drafted the Convention on the Rights of Persons with Disabilities and served as the chairperson on the Committee on the Rights of Persons with Disabilities. In 2017, Cisternas was appointed the Special Envoy on Disability and Accessibility for the UN.

== Biography ==
Cisternas was born on November 4, 1959, in Santiago. Cisternas was diagnosed with retinitis pigmentosa at the age of fourteen. She attended the Pontifical Catholic University of Chile where she studied Legal Sciences and earned a master's degree in Political Science. While she was in college, her vision continued to worsen, but she hid her condition from teachers and classmates. Becoming blind was difficult for Cisternas to accept, but eventually she started working to secure the rights of people with disabilities. Cisternas went on to become a lawyer and disability rights activist.

She created the Legal Disability Program at the Diego Portales University in 2000 and chaired the department until 2008. In 2001, she was part of a team that fought a lawsuit on behalf of the Deaf community to demand the inclusion of sign language and closed captions on television in Chile. Cisternas also created a group called Corporación Pro Ayuda al Débil Visual (COPRADEV) and served as president.

From 2006 to 2008, Cisternas worked on the ad hoc committee that created the Convention on the Rights of Persons with Disabilities. In 2014, she was awarded the National Prize of Human Rights (Premio Nacional de los Derechos Humanos) from the Instituto Nacional de Derechos Humanos (INDH) recognizing her for her work on the intersection of the rights of people with disabilities and the rights of women, children, senior citizens and indigenous people. Cisternas served as the chairperson on the Committee on the Rights of Persons with Disabilities. Cisternas was appointed the Special Envoy on Disability and Accessibility by the United Nations Secretary-General, António Guterres in 2017.
