= Giorgio Boccardo =

Chilean politician

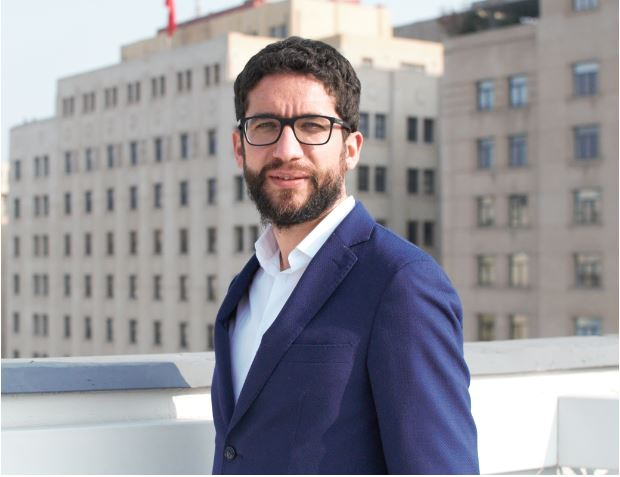
- Boccardo in 2023

Minister of Labor
- In office 7 April 2025 – 11 March 2026
- President: Gabriel Boric
- Preceded by: Jeannette Jara
- Succeeded by: Tomás Rau

Undersecretary of Labor
- In office 11 March 2022 – 7 April 2025
- President: Gabriel Boric
- Preceded by: Fernando Arab

President of the University of Chile Student Federation
- In office 16 November 2006 – 22 November 2007
- Preceded by: Nicolás Grau
- Succeeded by: Jaime Zamorano

Personal details
- Born: 20 February 1982 (age 44) Vina del Mar, Chile
- Party: Broad Front (2024−present); Commons (2019−2024)
- Other political affiliations: SurDA Movement (2008−2019); Autonomous Left (2008−2019)
- Education: Pontifical Catholic University of Valparaíso (no degree); University of Chile (Bachelor of Arts) (Master of Arts)
- Occupation: Politician
- Profession: Sociologist

Giorgio Davide Boccardo Bosoni (born 20 November 1982) is a Chilean politician and scholar who serves as the Minister of Labor since 7 April 2025.

From 2006 to 2007, he was the president of the University of Chile Student Federation.

== Biography ==
He was born on 20 February 1982 in the Chilean city of Viña del Mar.

He completed his primary education at the Scuola Italiana Arturo Dell'Oro, located in the commune of Valparaíso. He later pursued higher education beginning in 2003, enrolling in the sociology program at the University of Chile, after having previously studied civil engineering for three years at the Pontifical Catholic University of Valparaíso (PUCV). He subsequently completed a master’s degree in Latin American studies and a doctorate in social sciences, both at the University of Chile.

== Political career ==
During his university years, he was a member of the executive board of the Federation of Students of the University of Chile (FECh), which was led by Nicolás Grau during the 2005–2006 period. He later ran as a candidate to succeed Grau, representing the SurDA movement, and was elected president of the FECh in late 2006. He was also a member of the Advisory Council for the ESUP in 2007 and served as a university senator between 2008 and 2010.

He has worked as an academic and researcher at the Faculty of Social Sciences, University of Chilea nd served as director of Fundación Nodo XXI between 2012 and 2022. At the foundation, he led research on labour issues, provided opinions on legislative initiatives in the Chamber of Deputies of Chile, contributed proposals to the Constitutional Convention, and promoted dialogue and coordination spaces with trade union actors.

=== Undersecretary and Minister ===
A member of the Comunes party, in February 2022 he was appointed by then president-elect Gabriel Boric as Undersecretary of Labour, a position he assumed on 11 March 2022 with the formal start of the administration.

On 7 April 2025, he assumed the position of Minister of Labour and Social Welfare on an acting basis, following the resignation of the incumbent minister, Jeannette Jara, who had been proclaimed as a presidential candidate by the Communist Party of Chile. He was confirmed in the post the following day.
