= Patricio Melero =

Chilean business manager and politician

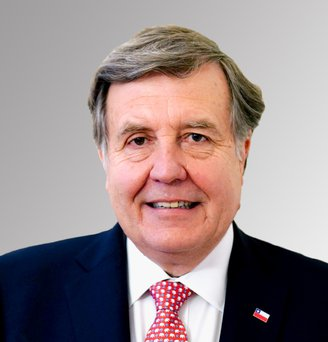
- Official portrait, 2021

Minister of Labor and Social Providence
- In office 7 April 2021 – 11 March 2022
- President: Sebastián Piñera
- Preceded by: María José Zaldívar
- Succeeded by: Jeanette Jara

Member of the Chamber of Deputies
- In office 11 March 2018 – 7 April 2021
- Preceded by: Creation of the district
- Succeeded by: Cristián Labbé Martínez
- Constituency: District 8
- In office 11 March 1990 – 11 March 2018
- Preceded by: Creation of the district
- Succeeded by: Dissolution of the district

Unión Demócrata Independiente President
- In office 30 March 2012 – 12 May 2014
- Preceded by: Juan Antonio Coloma Correa
- Succeeded by: Ernesto Silva Méndez

President of the Chamber of Deputies of Chile
- In office 15 March 2011 – 20 March 2012
- Preceded by: Alejandra Sepúlveda
- Succeeded by: Nicolás Monckeberg

Mayor of Pudahuel
- In office 12 September 1985 – 17 July 1989
- Preceded by: Sergio Oyarzún Arriagada
- Succeeded by: María Inés Suárez Montoya

General Secretary of the Youth
- In office March 1983 – August 1985
- Preceded by: Luis Cordero Baeza
- Succeeded by: Ignacio Fernández Doren

Personal details
- Born: 19 July 1956 (age 70) Santiago, Chile
- Party: Unión Demócrata Independiente (UDI; 1989–)
- Spouse: María Alejandrina Donoso
- Children: Two
- Parent(s): José Manuel Melero; Beatriz Abaroa
- Education: Universidad de Chile (BA)
- Profession: Agricultural engineer

Patricio Melero Abaroa (born 19 June 1956) is a Chilean politician and agricultural engineer, militant from Unión Demócrata Independiente (UDI), party which he was president.

He was a collaborator of Augusto Pinochet's dictatorship (1973–1990).

On 7 April 2021, he assumed the post of Minister of Labor and Social Provision after being appointed by Sebastián Piñera during his second government (2018–2022), administration where he official and initially he supported as deputy. Thus, Cristián Labbé Martínez replaced him.
