= Sofía Cancino de Cuevas =

- Born: July 29, 1897; Mexico City, Mexico
- Died: December 16, 1982 (aged 85); Mexico City, Mexico
- Genres: Classical
- Occupation(s): Composer, conductor, opera singer
- Instrument(s): Piano, singing

Sofía Cancino de Cuevas (July 29, 1897 – December 16, 1982) was a Mexican composer, pianist, opera promoter, singer, and her country's first woman symphonic conductor.

== Biography ==
Sofía Cancino de Cuevas was born in Mexico City on July 29, 1897. At age 22 she obtained the title of piano teacher at the Pedro Luis Ogazón Academy. In 1932 she entered the National Autonomous University of Mexico (UNAM) School of Music, where she studied singing with Consuelo Escobar de Castro and David Silva, as well as complementary composition courses with Rafael J. Tello, Manuel Ponce and Julián Carrillo. In 1935 the Adagio and the Allegro of her First Symphony premiered at the Simón Bolívar Amphitheater.

In 1937 she began her career as a performer, playing Mozart's Krönungskozert for piano and orchestra and singing various opera arias in the mezzo-soprano tessitura. That same year her concerto for piano and orchestra was released. The following year, she debuted in the role of Rosina in the opera The Barber of Seville in the Auditorium of the American School, alongside tenor Carlos Mejía and under the direction of J.M. Acuña. In 1939, Cancino de Cuevas completed her composition studies. That year she premiered her first quartet for strings, catalogued as Op. 1. In 1940, she received an honorable mention for her symphonic poem El gallo en Pátzcuaro for orchestra and male choir, in a contest organized by UNAM. In 1941 she directed the presentation of Mozart's Don Giovanni at the Arbeu theater, with the participation of singers Ángel R. Esquivel (baritone), Carlos Mejía (tenor), and Margarita Cueto (soprano), among others. This made her Mexico's first female conductor. In 1944 she founded the Opera School, with which she conducted La serva padrona by Giovanni Battista Pergolesi, Bastien und Bastienne by Wolfgang Amadeus Mozart, and Il matrimonio segreto by Domenico Cimarosa at the Palacio de Bellas Artes in November of that same year.

In 1947 Cancino de Cuevas sang the lead role of Gioachino Rossini's La Cenerentola at the Palacio de Bellas Artes, under the baton of Umberto Mugnai. In the Beethoven room of the Hotel Reforma she presented violinist Jeanne Court and the singers Lorenzo Canno and Alfred Knopf. In successive years she presented complete operas with costumes and set design at private functions as part of her opera dissemination activities. Among them were the 1962 Mexican run of Rossini's L'italiana in Algeri, where she played the main role of Isabella, once again under the baton of Umberto Mugnai. Under her orchestral direction and arrangement, she presented operas such as The Barber of Seville by Rossini, Don Pasquale, L'elisir d'amore, and Lucia di Lammermoor by Gaetano Donizetti, and La traviata by Giuseppe Verdi. Of her prolific output as a composer, only a small part was released; the rest, including all of her operas, remains unpublished.

Sofía Cancino de Cuevas died in Mexico City on December 16, 1982, at age 85.

== Works ==
Sofía Cancino de Cuevas was the author of just under a hundred pieces, including works for symphonic orchestra, operas, orchestra and choir, chamber music, solo piano, and piano and voice. The work of Cancino remains virtually unpublished. At present it is cataloged by Alejandro Duprat. The task has led the musician to think that Cancino may be the first Mexican woman composer to have created a symphony. Duprat also managed to compile a list of the works of Cancino that, despite being recorded among her output, are missing, including a concert for piano and orchestra, the Second Symphony, and the operas Michoacana and Promesa d'artista e parola di re. Currently, the works that remain in the hands of the family are in the process of registration with the Society of Authors and Composers of Mexico. The main objective is to interest orchestras in performing the composer's creations.

=== Symphonic works ===
- First Symphony
- Second Symphony in G Major
- Piano Concerto
- C'est la vie, symphonic poem
- Un gallo en Pátzcuaro, symphonic poem for orchestra and male choir. It received an honorable mention in the composition contest convened by the National Autonomous University of Mexico in 1940.

=== Chamber music ===
- Quartet for Strings, Op. 1
- Numerous concert songs for voice and piano based on poems by various contemporary poets

=== Operas ===
- Gil González de Ávila, opera in fifteen scenes based on the historical homonymous drama by José Peón Contreras, composed in 1938
- Annette, opera in one act with libretto in French, composed in 1945
- Michoacana, opera, date of composition unknown
- Promesa d'artista e parola di re, opera, date of composition unknown

== Honors ==
- Member of the Association of Mexican University Students, whose registration appears as a music teacher, composer, singer, and orchestra director
- Acknowledgments by José Montes de Oca, General Secretary of the Mexican Musical Athenaeum (June 29, 1939)
- In 1940, Cancino de Cuevas received an honorable mention for her symphonic poem El gallo en Pátzcuaro, for orchestra and male choir, in a contest organized by UNAM.
