= Valenzuela, Spain =

Valenzuela
- Municipality
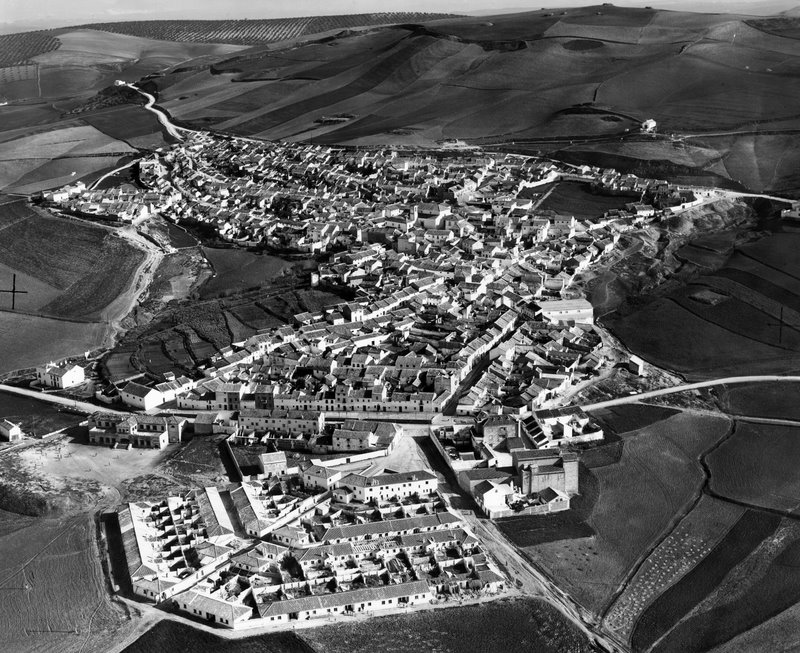
- Valenzuela in the 60s

- Coat of arms

- Location in Spain
- Coordinates: 37°46′30″N 4°13′11″W
- Country: Spain
- Autonomous Community: Andalusia
- Province: Córdoba
- Comarca: Campiña de Baena

Government
  - Mayor: Antonio Pedregosa (PP)

Area
  - Total: 19 km^{2} (7.3 sq mi)
- Elevation (AMSL): 341 m (1,119 ft)

Population (2025-01-01)
  - Total: 1,030
  - Density: 54/km^{2} (140/sq mi)
- Time zone: UTC+1 (CET)
  - Summer (DST): UTC+2 (CEST (GMT +2))
- Postal code: 14670
- Area code: +34 (Spain) + 957 (Córdoba)

Valenzuela is a municipality in the province of Córdoba, Spain. In 2016 it had 1208 inhabitants. Its surface area is 19 km^{2} and has a density of 63.58 inhabitants / km². It is located at an altitude of 341 meters above sea level and 84 kilometers from the capital of the province, Córdoba.

Belonging to the region of the East-Guadajoz Campiña. Located in the east of the province, its urban center sits at the foot of the Alto de la Dehesa or Cerro Boyero. The demonym is valenzoletana / o although the term "vinagorra / o" (derived from wine or biznaga) is used more.

== Toponymy ==
In Spanish, Valenzuela is a diminutive form of Valencia which means "little Valencia".

== Geography ==
The highest areas are the eastern one, where the elevations of El Gato (403 masl), Cerro de Fuente María (439 masl) and Cerro Boyero or Alto de la Dehesa (475 masl) are aligned. This last hill is crowned by an oval plateau of about 14 hectares. Its altitude with respect to the foot is 180 m in the north, although in the other slopes the level difference is smaller. Its northern skirt, in which the town is, is the least steep and its opposite slope, the steepest.

In the center of the municipality, Las Barquillas (319 masl), Haza Renta, El Cahíz (329 masl) and Los Terreros stand out. To the north, Las Albarizas (313 masl), La Silera (319 masl) and Zamarrón.

The lowest level, 260 meters above sea level, is located in the Algarbe stream, northwest of the term.

Two types of soil predominate: vertisols and gypsisols.

Vertisols are found in depressions between loamy hills. They are deep soils, gray or brown gray more or less dark. They crack in summer and get muddy in winter. The dedication of these soils is the cultivation of cereals and cotton, although currently it is also dedicated to an olive grove.

Gypsisols have been developed on plaster marls of the trias. They sit in the gentle hills of the countryside. They have carbonates so they are classified as calcium gypsisols. They have a low content of organic matter, alkaline pH, are usually muddy clay or clay, dry hard and compact and wet plastics. In the lower horizons they have small pieces of crystallized plaster. They are largely grown in olive groves.

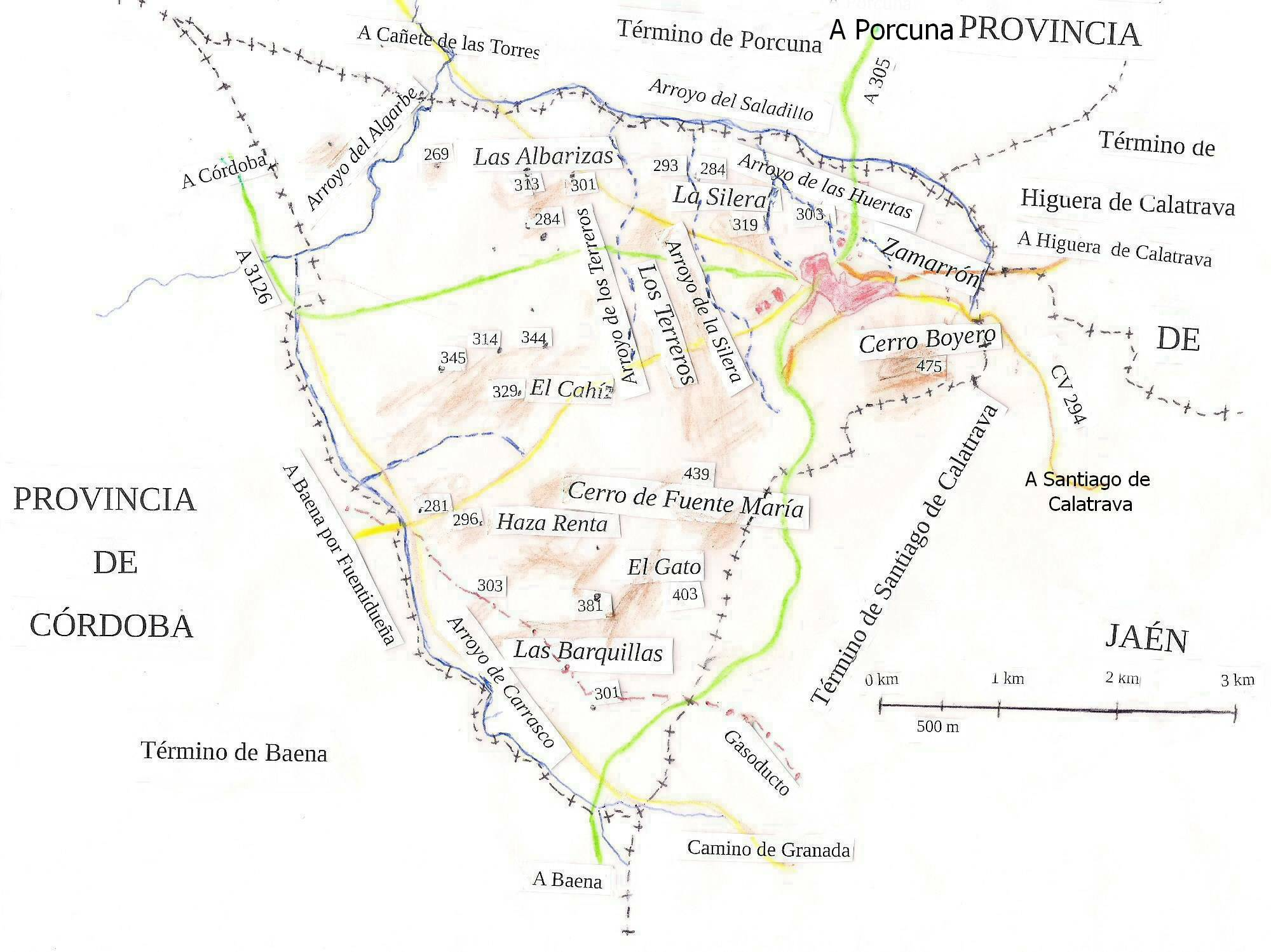
Spanish sketch of Valenzuela's relief and hydrography

=== Hydrography ===
Due to the low amount of rainfall, it needs to be supplied with drinking water from the Quiebrajano river swamp. The spring water that traditionally fed the fountain and the pillars is currently used to irrigate the orchards near the village and fill a cistern, which is available to farmers. This spring is born on the northern slope of Cerro Boyero. On the other slopes springs flow with less flow: Pozo Nuevo, La Añora and La Viña. The water in most other wells is brackish.

Streams are usually dry for most of the year. The most abundant is that of the Saladillo, which receives water from everyone else. It is born in the eastern part of Cerro Boyero, forms the limit along 4 km with the province of Jaén. On the left, the Huertas stream, the La Silera slope and the Terreros stream flow into the municipality. In the municipality of Porcuna, one kilometer from the provincial limit receives the flow of the Algarbe stream.

The basin of the stream of the Huertas is constituted by the northern slope of Cerro Boyero. The central current is joined by the one that comes from Las Erillas, to the East, and the one from Arroyazo, to the West.

The slope of La Silera collects water the western slope of Cerro Boyero and the eastern slope of Los Terreros. Los Terreros stream receives water from that hill.

The Algarbe stream is born at the end of Baena and runs through Valenzuela along 2 km through its lowest zone. Receive by the South the Carrasco stream, which forms the limit with that term.

Source for Relief and Hydrography: Cartographic Base of Andalusia. Institute of Statistics and Cartography of Andalusia.

=== Climate ===
It can be framed in the Mediterranean climate (Csa) in the Köppen climate classification, although it approximates in some ways the continental climate.

Average rainfall between 1958 and 1985: 512 mm. It is an amount less than that of Córdoba, whose average annual rainfall is 605 mm.

== Economy ==
38 companies are registered, 25 of them dedicated to trade, transport and hospitality, and 6 to the industry (INE. 2012). Predominates (2009) the cultivation of the olive grove (1,122.07 hectares on a total of 1,123.57 hectares dedicated to woody crops), followed by wheat (228 hectares over 369.14 hectares of herbaceous crops). (Source: Instituto de Statistics and Cartography of Andalusia). Of the six companies dedicated to the industry, the two most important are oil mills. This fact, together with the practical monoculture of the olive grove, causes almost all employment to be seasonal.

The active population (2,001) was 609, with the unemployment rate being 67% (Source: Institute of Statistics and Cartography of Andalusia)

Other economic data can be found in the "Economic data form". The external link is at the end of the article.

== Main sights ==
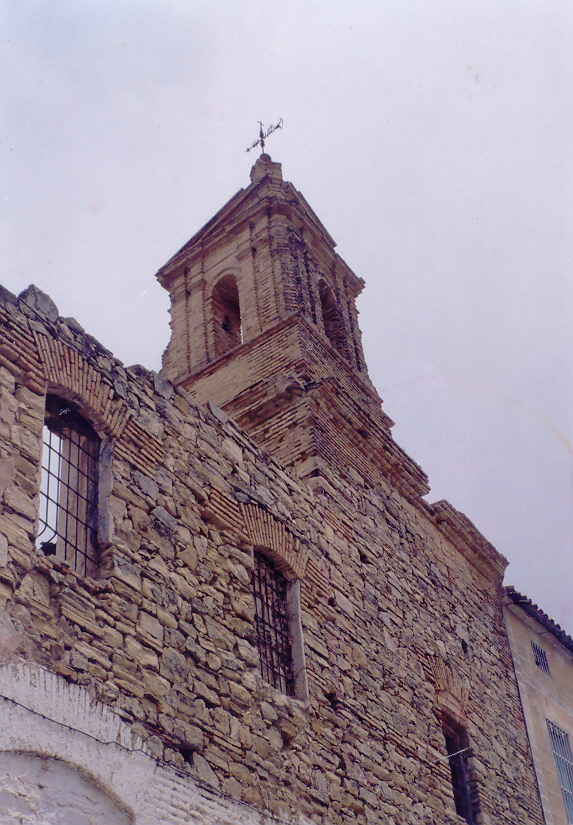
Jesus and Mary Hospital

- Jesus and Mary hospital. Built in 1809.40 after being abandoned and used as a barn at the end of the 19th century, in 1923 the chapelwas restored by the pastor, who also added another part to his house. In 1925 the girls' school was installed43 and the following year it was completely reformed to house the other classrooms. From the postwar period until its abandonment in 1960, approximately, several families were housed. From it the bell tower is preserved, recently restored. The rest of the building has been restored and turned into a cultural center.
- Cerro Boyero: it has been discovered an anthropomorphic relief and an Iberian inscription, whose graphic signs belong to the Southern Iberian Paleo-Hispanic system.
- Hermitage of Calvary: construction of the late seventies crowned by the "umbrella" of the tower of the former parish of the Assumption. The town dominates from the hill Boyero.
- Parish of Our Lady of the Assumption. Built in 1977 of new plant in part of the site of the old church built in the eighteenth century. A recent restoration has endowed it with baroque elements characteristic of some Andalusian temples.
- Juan el Impresor cultural center: former barn remodeled as an auditorium. The denomination corresponds to the founder of the first printing press in India: Juan Rodríguez de Bustamente (1536-1588), Jesuit born in Valenzuela.

== Holidays ==
- Holy Week: the so-called "Sermon of the Square" takes place on Good Friday morning, where passages from the Bible are represented.
- Fiestas de San Roque: fair held from August 14 to 17.
- San Isidro: Held the weekend after May 15, with a solemn procession and a pilgrimage in which the whole town participates with floats, horses.
- Procession of Corpus: it is the most important festival of this population. It has been declared of national tourist interest and included in the Digital Guide of the Intangible Heritage of Andalusia. The streets are adorned with the famous carpets known by the children of the town, made of multicolored sawdust. It is celebrated on Saturday and Sunday following Thursday of Corpus Christi. In the early hours of Saturday, the sawdust is placed, an activity in which tourists or townspeople can participate, and on Sunday morning the carpets, pots, corners, altars, sheets and all the articles with which they have traditionally been traditionally exposed Decorated the streets for these holidays. In the afternoon there is the "exit from custody" - a beautiful tradition - on its silver throne with the children who accompany it.
- Virgen de la Cabeza: the Thursday before the last Sunday of April says goodbye to the flags that will accompany the older brothers to the pilgrimage. The following Monday I sell the image of the Virgin in procession

== See also ==
- List of municipalities in Córdoba
