= Academy of Christian Humanism University =

Coordinates: 33°26′15″S 70°37′39″W

- Universidad Academia de Humanismo Cristiano
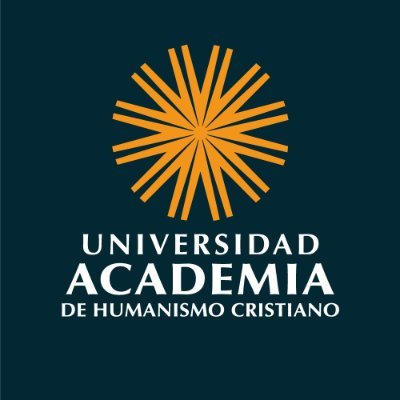
- Motto: El camino diferente
- Motto in English: A different road
- Type: Private
- Established: 1975
- Rector: Alvaro Ramis Olivos
- Faculty: 200 JCE (2024)
- Students: 4.100 (2024)
- Location: Santiago, Chile
- Website: www.academia.cl

The Academy of Christian Humanism University (UAHC) (Spanish: Universidad Academia de Humanismo Cristiano) is a Chilean non-profit private university, founded in 1988 but whose origins date back to 1975 when establishing the Academy of Christian Humanism, led by Cardinal Raúl Silva Henríquez (SDB), whose purpose was to bring together a group of intellectuals to discuss the politics, society, economy and culture of Chile.

This university, also known simply as La Academia (The Academy) is accredited in the areas of Institutional Management and Undergraduate Studies by the National Commission on Accreditation, an organization that ensures the quality of higher education in Chile, for a period of 4 years from August 2022 and August 2026.

The University now offers 44 courses leading to diploma and degree graduates, special programs and 3 master's programs in the areas of Social Sciences, Education, Arts and Culture, State, Economy and Management, and also a PhD in Latin American Studies with 10 years of experience.

== History ==
The university began in 1975 when Cardinal Raúl Silva Henríquez (SDB) prompted the establishment of the Academy of Christian Humanism, a center for studies in a framework of freedom and pluralism. This institution has enabled a large group of intellectuals in Chile, especially in the field of social sciences, an area for creating and disseminating knowledge on the political, economic, social and cultural of Chile under the Pinochet's military dictatorship.

The Academy of Christian Humanism University was founded in 1988 as a university within the framework of human values from various strands of social thought, with a decisive role in the formation of new generations of professionals in Chile. This has been setting up work areas, which integrates the teaching, research, extension and interdisciplinary studies of the phenomena characteristic of contemporary society.

This university has been defined as university of academic excellence, that definition is supported by the high quality of its teachers and researchers, and as an open space for discussion and reflection. This position is reflected in the promotion of critical thinking and divergent, through constructive dialogue.

This university acquired full autonomy in 1999, awarded by the Higher Education Council of Chile, consolidating a secular and pluralistic university, consistent with the values of humanism that gave origin.

== Colleges and undergraduate programs ==
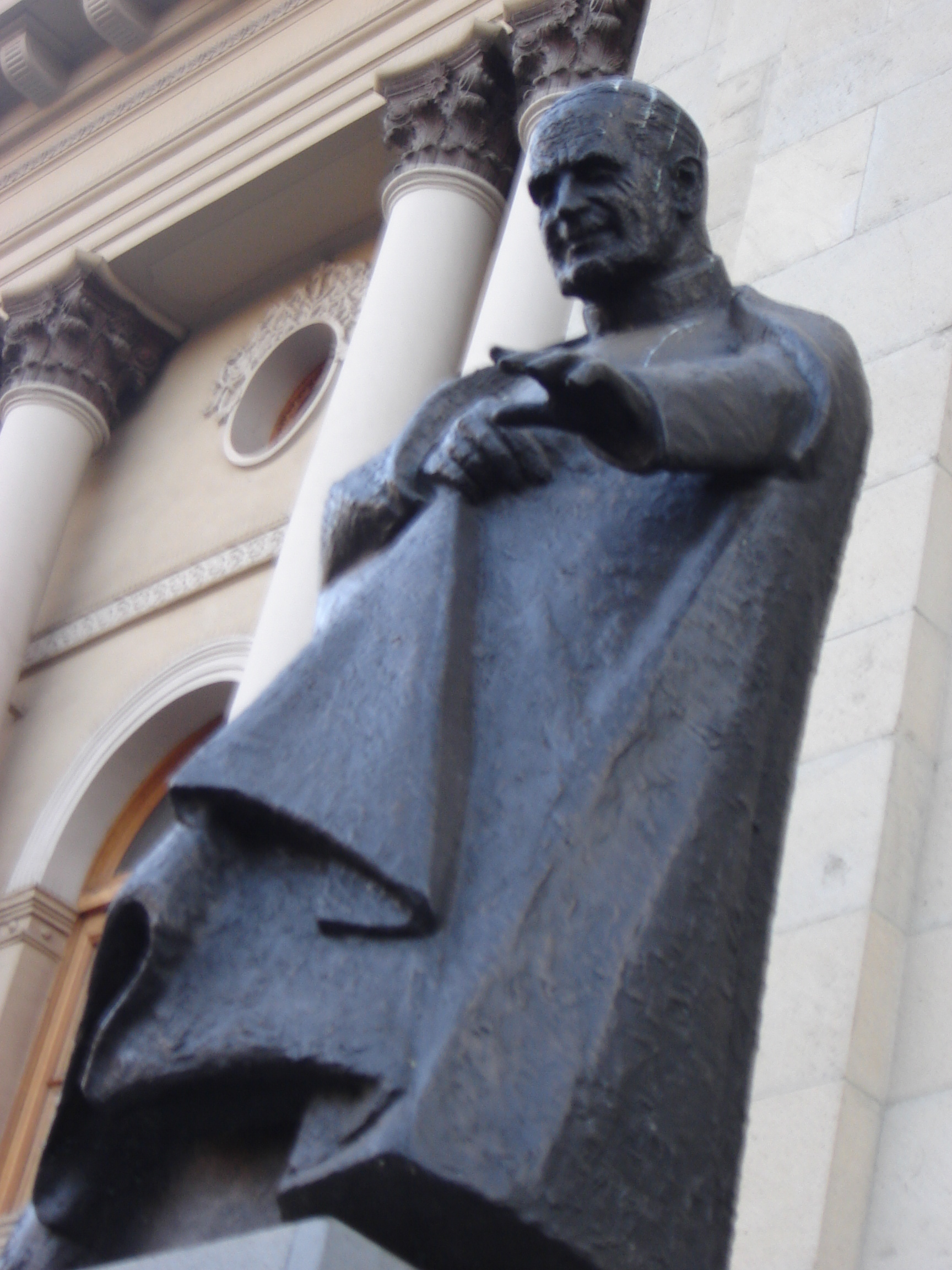
Cardinal Raúl Silva Henríquez (SDB), leading advocate for the creation of the Academy of Christian Humanism

The Universidad Academia de Humanismo Cristiano (UAHC) is structured into three Faculties. As of 2025, it offers the following programs:

- Faculty of Arts

Architecture, Arts and Crafts, Film and Audiovisual Arts, Music Composition, Dance, Performing Arts Design, Music Performance, Music Production, Theater, and a Special Program in Arts.

- Faculty of Social Sciences and Education

Public Administration (daytime, evening, and special graduation program), Anthropology, Political Science and International Relations, Law (daytime and evening), Teaching in Special Education with a specialization in Specific and Socio-affective Learning Difficulties (daytime and second degree program), Teaching in History and Social Sciences, Teaching in Spanish Language and Communication, Music Education, Psychology (daytime, evening, and Second Degree Program), Journalism (daytime and special graduation program), Sociology (daytime and special graduation program), Social Work (daytime and special graduation program), Computer Science and Data Science Engineering.

- Faculty of Health and Well-being

Nursing, Kinesiology, Nutrition and Dietetics, Medical Technology, Occupational Therapy, Obstetrics.

- Master's Programs

Master in Latin American Folk Art, Master in Education with a specialization in Transformational Leadership and School Management, Master in Critical Methodologies for Social Research.

- Doctoral Programs

Doctorate in Latin American Studies, Doctorate in Education (not currently accepting applications).

== Location ==
- Condell Campus: Campus of the Faculty of Social Sciences and Education, Condell 343, Providencia, near Baquedano and Salvador Metro stations.
- Rectory and Community Services: Condell 282, Providencia.
- Psychology Teaching Staff: Maria Luisa Santander 0372, Providencia.
- Faculty of Arts Campus: Serrano 150, Santiago, near Universidad de Chile Metro station.
- Casa Arrau: Huérfanos 2186, Santiago, near Cumming Metro station.
- Faculty of Health and Well-being Campus: Salvador Sanfuentes 2357/2355, Santiago, near República Metro station.
- Interfaculty Campus: Av. Libertador Bernardo O'Higgins 2240, Santiago. Metro República.
