= Catalina Pérez Salinas =

Chilean lawyer, politician and activist

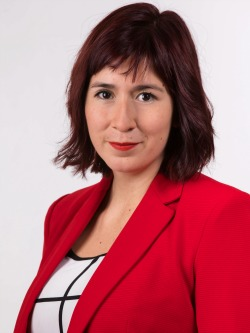

Member of the Chamber of Deputies
- Incumbent
- Assumed office March 11, 2018
- Preceded by: District established
- Constituency: District 3

Personal details
- Born: 1990 (age 35–36) Malmö, Sweden
- Party: Democratic Revolution
- Education: Catholic University of the North
- Occupation: Lawyer, politician, and activist

Catalina Ilona Io Pérez Salinas (born 1990) is a Chilean lawyer, politician, and activist. She currently serves as a member of the Chamber of Deputies of Chile, representing the District 3 for the 2022–2026 term, and from January 2019 to June 2021 was president of the Democratic Revolution party.

== Biography ==
Catalina Pérez Salinas was born in 1990 in Malmö, Sweden, to Ricardo Pérez Miranda and María Ángela Salinas Meza, who were exiled by the military dictatorship. Her family returned to Chile in 1994, settling in the city of Antofagasta.

She attended primary and secondary school from 1997 to 2006 at the Liceo Experimental Artístico in Antofagasta, and she completed her studies in 2007–2008 at the Colegio Academia Tarapacá in Iquique. During the 2006 student protests in Chile, she served as coordinator of secondary students for Antofagasta and one of the movement's regional spokespeople.

She then enrolled as a law student at Catholic University of the North, graduating as a lawyer in 2017. While at Catholic University of the North, she participated in the 2011–2013 Chilean student protests, representing the university's Faculty of Humanities. She later became the school's Student Center president.

== Political career ==
Pérez Salinas first became involved in politics at age 13, as an activist with the Communist Youth of Chile. In 2014, she joined the Democratic Revolution party.

In the 2017 Chilean general election, she ran as a candidate for the Chamber of Deputies to represent District 3, as part of the Broad Front coalition. She was elected with 3.76% of the vote to serve a term from 2018–2022. As a member of the Chamber of Deputies, she joined the Permanent Committee on the Environment and Natural Resources, as well as the Interior, Nationality, Citizenship, and Regionalization Committee. She is part of the Broad Front parliamentary committee.

In January 2019, she was elected president of the Democratic Revolution party, a position she held until June 2021.

She won reelection for a second four-year term in the 2021 Chilean general election.

In June 2023, she announced her suspension from the board of directors of the Chamber of Deputies, where she served as vice president, due to questions over multimillion-dollar contracts between a foundation linked to her then-partner Daniel Andrade, "Fundación Democracia Viva," and the Antofagasta Ministry of Housing, led by her cabinet member Carlos Contreras. This situation led to a political scandal called the Convenios case, which involved a series of investigations of agreements between Chilean state entities and private non-governmental organizations. On July 6, Pérez Salinas was given a year's suspension from membership in the Democratic Revolution party.
