= Gabriela Mistral University =

Chilean university

Coordinates: 33.432°S 70.606°W

- Established: 20 February 1981
- Location: Santiago, Chile
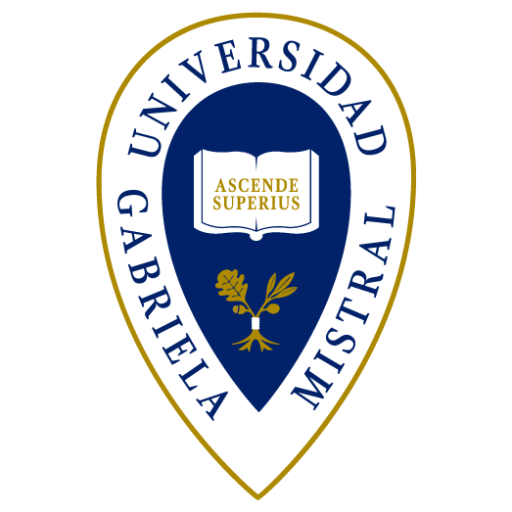

Gabriela Mistral University (Spanish: Universidad Gabriela Mistral) is a privately funded university in Santiago, Chile.

Waldo L. Parra, the author of the national bestseller Masones & Libertadores teaches law at this university.
