= 2021 Chilean general election =

- Presidential election
- 21 November 2021 (first round); 19 December 2021 (second round)
- Opinion polls
- Turnout: 47.33% (first round) ▲0.61pp 55.64% (second round) ▲6.62pp
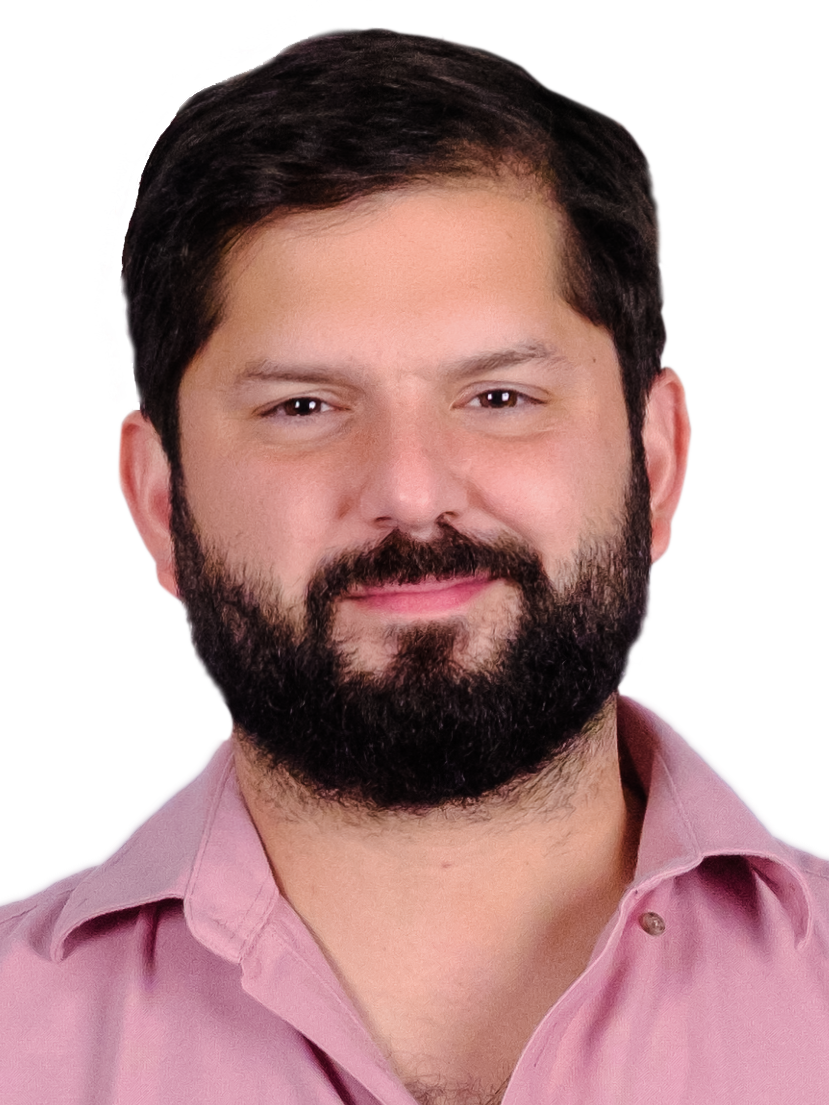

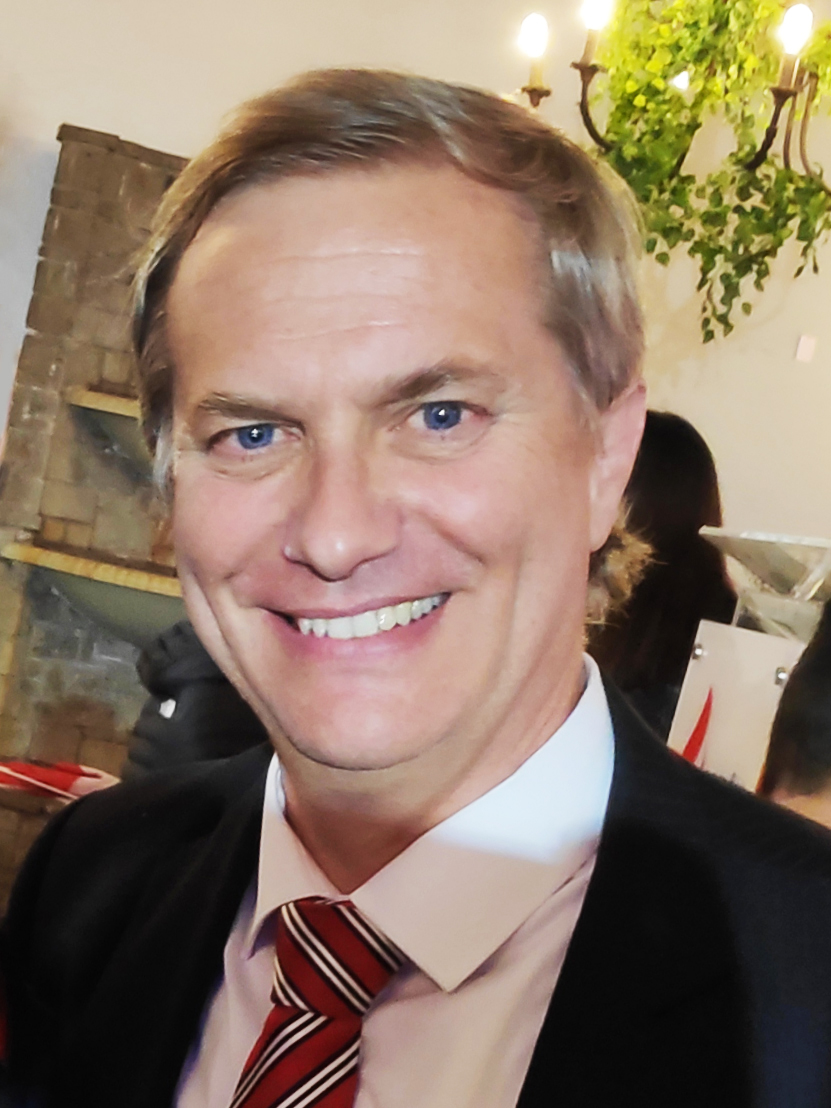
Candidate	Gabriel Boric	José Antonio Kast
Party	Social Convergence	Republican
Alliance	Apruebo Dignidad	Christian Social Front
Popular vote	4,620,890	3,650,088
Percentage	55.87%	44.13%
President before election
Sebastián Piñera
Independent
Elected President
Gabriel Boric
Social Convergence
- Chamber of Deputies
- 21 November 2021
- All 155 seats in the Chamber of Deputies; 78 seats needed for a majority
Party	Vote %	Seats	+/–
Chile Podemos Más	25.43	53	−19
Apruebo Dignidad	20.94	37	+17
New Social Pact	17.16	37	−6
Christian Social Front	11.18	15	New
PDG	8.45	6	New
Dignidad Ahora	5.10	3	New
Green	4.83	2	New
United Independents	2.96	1	New
Independents	1.44	1	0
This lists parties that won seats. See the complete results below.
- Senate
- 21 November 2021
- 27 of the 50 seats in the Senate
Party	Vote %	Seats	+/–
Chile Podemos Más	27.86	24	+5
Apruebo Dignidad	19.57	5	+4
New Social Pact	15.59	18	+3
Christian Social Front	8.62	1	New
Independents	9.31	2	+1
This lists parties that won seats. See the complete results below.

General elections were held in Chile on 21 November 2021, including presidential, parliamentary and regional elections. Voters went to the polls to elect a president to serve a four-year term, 27 of 50 members of the Senate to serve an eight-year term, all 155 members of the Chamber of Deputies to serve a four-year term and all 302 members of the regional boards to serve a three-year term. (Note: It was the last opportunity in which the regional boards members are elected together with the presidential and parliamentary elections, since from the next election, scheduled for October 2024, they will be elected together with the mayors, councilors and regional governors, being the first election of the latter in April 2021. Therefore, the term of the regional boards members elected in 2021 will last just under three years, between 11 March 2022 and 6 January 2025.) Following an electoral reform in 2015, the Senate increased its membership from 38 to 43 in 2017 and grew to its full size of 50 seats after this election.

Despite narrowly trailing conservative candidate José Antonio Kast in the first round of the presidential election, leftist candidate Gabriel Boric emerged as the winner of the second round with 56% of the vote, a larger margin than predicted by opinion polls. Kast conceded defeat shortly after voting ended. At the age of 35, Boric became the youngest president ever elected in Chile and also set a record for receiving the highest number of votes in Chilean history. The turnout in the second round increased to 56%, the highest since voting became voluntary in Chile in 2013.

In the parliamentary elections the center-right coalition Chile Podemos Más remained the largest bloc in both chambers and increased their number of senators, despite seeing their vote share fall by more than 10 percentage points compared to the previous election. On the left, the new coalition Apruebo Dignidad saw gains at the expense of the center-left New Social Pact (NPS), becoming the second largest bloc in the Chamber of Deputies. However, NPS won more seats in the Senate. New parties, including the far-right Republican Party and the populist Party of the People, also gained several seats. Consequently, the newly elected Congress was split evenly between the combined left and right, (Note: The combined left coalition, including Apruebo Dignidad, New Social Pact, Dignidad Ahora and the Green Ecologist Party had 79 deputies and 24 senators. The combined right coalition, including Chile Podemos Más and the Republican Party had 68 deputies and 25 senators. Eight deputies and two senators are not considered part of any coalition.) with the non-aligned congresspeople holding the balance of power.

On 11 March 2022 all the newly elected authorities, including president-elect Boric, took office.

== Analysis ==
The 2021 Chilean election cycle was notable for its polarization, representing a departure from the country's political normality. Against the backdrop of the 2019 protests, the writing of a new constitution, and the COVID-19 pandemic, the dominant center-left and center-right coalitions that had ruled the country since the end of the military dictatorship experienced a significant drop in support in the elections for mayors, governors, and members of the Constitutional Convention held on May 15 and 16.

In the subsequent presidential election, candidates from the traditional centrist coalitions finished in fourth and fifth place, while two candidates from newly formed parties and coalitions, Kast and Boric, qualified for the second round. This represented a departure from the country's political history, which had repeatedly seen power bounce between center-right and center-left parties with little structural movement between presidents.

The desire for change among voters led them to reject the traditional political parties and support candidates from new parties. Kast of the far-right Republican Party ran a campaign on populist and Christian conservative values, emphasizing "law and order" and drawing comparisons with US president Donald Trump and former Brazilian president Jair Bolsonaro. In contrast, Boric, a member of the left-wing Apruebo Dignidad coalition, campaigned on a progressive message reflecting the ideas behind the 2019 protests. He advocated for broadening the social safety net, higher taxes on the wealthy, combating climate change, social justice, and change to the current privatized pension system. Boric also supported the ongoing writing of a new Chilean constitution, while Kast repeatedly said he would interfere to stop its ratification if elected.

== Electoral system ==
The President is elected using the two-round system; if no candidate receives a majority of the vote in the first round, a second round will be held.

The 50 members of the Senate are elected for eight-year terms, with around half of the Senators renewed at each general election. Senators are elected from 16 multi-member constituencies of between two and five seats based on the regions. Seats are filled by party list proportional representation. Each voter votes for one party list or list of a coalition. Seats are allocated by the d'Hondt method.The 2021 elections saw 27 members elected, representing the regions of Antofagasta, Biobío, Coquimbo, O'Higgins, Los Lagos, Los Ríos, Magallanes and Santiago Metropolitan Region. (Vacancies of seats arising between general elections are filled by a person selected by the same party.)

In the National Congress, the 155 members of the Chamber of Deputies are elected from 28 multi-member constituencies with between three and eight seats by party list proportional representation. Each voter votes for one party list or list of a coalition. Seats are allocated by the d'Hondt method. (Vacancies of seats arising between general elections are filled by a person selected by the same party.)

== Presidential candidates ==
=== Summary of candidates ===
Below is the list of candidacies for president accepted by the Electoral Service on 27 August 2021. Boric's and Sichel's candidacies were automatically accepted after they were proclaimed the winner of their respective primaries by the Election Certification Tribunal.

Candidate	Endorsement	Ideology
Gabriel Boric; Social Convergence	Apruebo Dignidad: Social Convergence; Commons; Social Green Regionalist Federation; Communist Party; Democratic Revolution; Humanist Action; Common Force; Unir Movement	Democratic socialism; Progressivism
José Antonio Kast (2019) José Antonio Kast; Republican Party	Christian Social Front: Republican Party; Christian Conservative Party	Conservatism; Right-wing populism
Yasna Provoste; Christian Democratic Party	New Social Pact: Christian Democratic Party; Citizens; Liberal Party; Party for Democracy; Radical Party; Socialist Party; New Deal; New Chile	Christian democracy; Social liberalism
Sebastián Sichel; Independent	Chile Podemos Más: Political Evolution; Democratic Independent Regionalist Party; National Renewal; Independent Democratic Union	Liberal conservatism; Economic liberalism
Eduardo Artés; Patriotic Union	Patriotic Union: Chilean Communist Party (Proletarian Action); Revolutionary Left Movement	Communism; Marxism–Leninism
Marco Enríquez-Ominami; Progressive Party	Progressive Party	Democratic socialism; Progressivism
Franco Parisi; Party of the People	Party of the People	Populism; E-democracy

=== Apruebo Dignidad ===

Apruebo Dignidad
Gabriel Boric
(Social Convergence)

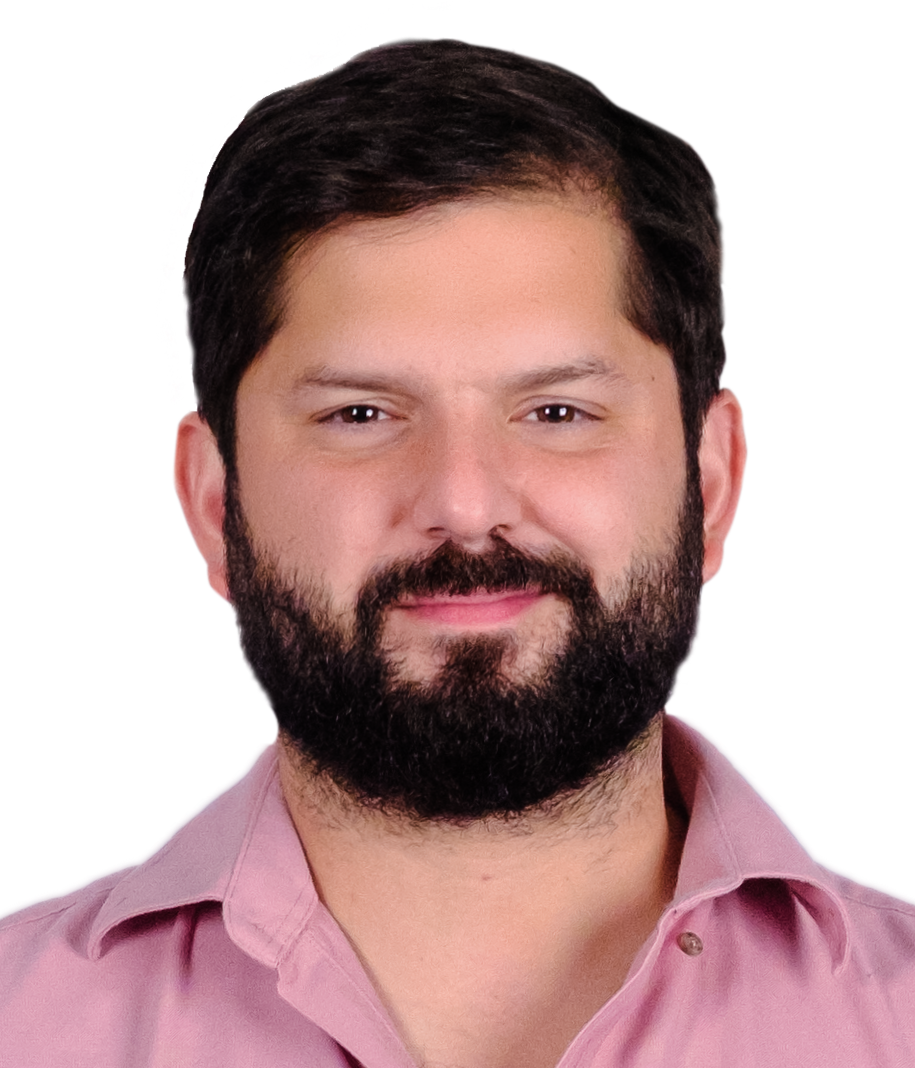

Deputy for Magallanes
(2014–2022)

The Apruebo Dignidad coalition decided its presidential candidate in the publicly-funded primaries held nationwide on 18 July 2021, won by lawmaker Gabriel Boric with 60% of the vote.

On 17 March 2021, Boric's party, Social Convergence, proclaimed him as its presidential candidate. The Commons Party's leadership also announced on 17 March 2021 that it would propose Boric as its presidential candidate in a meeting of the party's leadership the following Saturday. On 23 March 2021, Democratic Revolution, the coalition's largest party, proclaimed Boric as its presidential candidate. On 29 May 2021, the Common Force movement gave its support to Boric, after he beat Marcelo Díaz in a plebiscite held on May 27–28. On 17 August 2021, the Acción Humanista movement proclaimed him as its candidate.

==== Defeated in primary ====
- Daniel Jadue (PC): Jadue is the mayor of Recoleta and a member of the Communist Party of Chile. He studied sociology at the University of Chile, and also studied total quality management at the Catholic University of the North. He appeared as the candidate with the most support in several opinion polls.

==== Dropped out ====
- Marcelo Díaz (Unir): In November 2020 the Unir Movement presented the deputy and former spokesman as pre-candidate. On 18 May 2021 he dropped out of the race and lent his support to Boric.
- Jaime Mulet (FRVS): The current president of the FRVS and deputy was proclaimed as his party's presidential candidate in September 2020. In May 2021, he received the support of the Christian Left movement. On 8 July 2021, the FRVS chose to support the candidacy of Daniel Jadue.

=== Chile Podemos Más ===

Chile Podemos Más
Sebastián Sichel
(Independent)

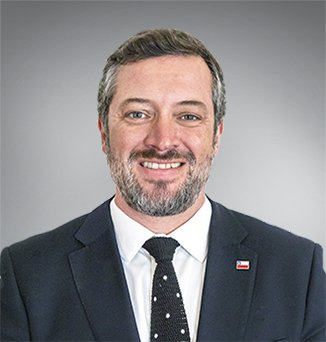

Minister of Social Development
(2019-2020)

The Chile Podemos Más center-right coalition (previously Chile Vamos) participated in the publicly-funded primaries held nationwide on 18 July 2021. Former minister Sebastián Sichel beat the other three candidates by 49% of the vote.

Sichel was minister of Social Development and president of BancoEstado during the second administration of President Sebastián Piñera. He participated as an independent candidate in the Chile Podemos Más primary, supported by former PDC supporters and other centrist political movements.

==== Defeated in primary ====
- Ignacio Briones (Evópoli): Briones is a university professor and economist who served as minister of Finance between 2019 and 2021. He was unanimously proclaimed by the Political Evolution party as their presidential candidate on 30 January 2021. He describes himself as a social liberal and seeks to promote liberal policies, although he is against abortion.
- Mario Desbordes (RN): Desbordes became minister of Defense in July 2020. Before that, he was a member of the Chamber of Deputies. He was also president of his party between 2018 and 2020 and secretary-general between 2010 and 2018. During the first administration of President Sebastián Piñera, he had a stint as undersecretary of Investigations. He was proclaimed by the PRI party as their candidate on 29 December 2020. On 23 January 2021 his own party, RN, chose him as their contender for the Chile Vamos primary race after winning nearly 73% of the vote of the General Council.
- Joaquín Lavín (UDI): Lavín studied economics at the University of Chicago. He was a presidential candidate in the 1999 and 2005 elections. He was also an economic appraiser of the neoliberal policies of Chile's military dictatorship. As mayor of Las Condes he actively promoted social housing programs for the poor and social integration with the rest of the cities, as well as enlarged use of technology in law enforcement and moderate social policies. He appeared as the candidate with the most support in most opinion polls.

==== Did not run ====
- Evelyn Matthei (UDI): Matthei is a right-wing politician. She studied at the Pontifical Catholic University of Chile. In 1993 she was the target of a scheme by Sebastián Piñera to prevent her from becoming a candidate for the presidency that year. She was a senator and candidate in Chile's presidential elections in 2013, losing to Michelle Bachelet, the Socialist candidate. She dropped out of the race on 17 May 2021, a day after being re-elected as mayor of Providencia.

=== New Social Pact ===
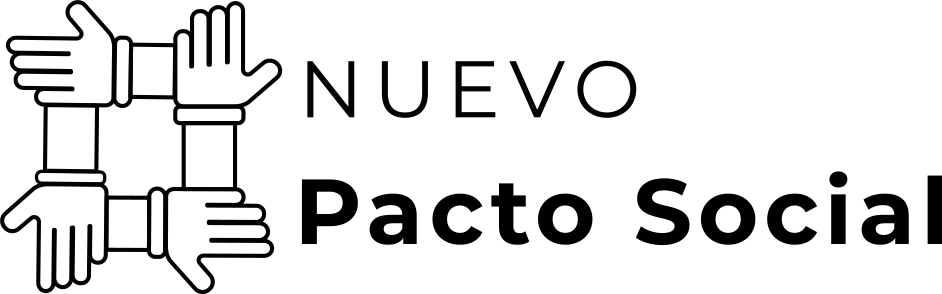

New Social Pact
Yasna Provoste
(Christian Democratic Party)

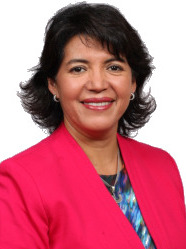

Senator for Atacama
(since 2018)
President of the Senate
(2021)

Christian Democrat Senator Yasna Provoste won the primary election held by the New Social Pact center-left coalition (formerly Constituent Unity) on August 21, 2021, with over 60% of the vote and a turnout of around 150,000. On May 30, 2021, Provoste had expressed her willingness to compete if her party deemed it necessary. She officially launched her candidacy on July 23, 2021, during a ceremony in her hometown of Vallenar, in northern Chile. On August 17, 2021, the Christian Democratic Party proclaimed her as their candidate.

The other primary candidates, Paula Narváez and Carlos Maldonado, urged the need for a primary to determine a single candidate after the coalition failed to come to an agreement to participate in the national publicly-funded primaries held on July 18, 2021.

==== Defeated in primary ====
- Carlos Maldonado (PR): The former minister of Justice and current president of the Radical Party was proclaimed as presidential candidate on 23 December 2020. On 20 May 2021 he announced he would go straight to the November election. On July 3, 2021, he backtracked on his decision and declared himself available to compete in a possible coalition primary.
- Paula Narváez (PS): The former minister was proclaimed by the Socialist Party's Central Committee as its presidential candidate on 28 January 2021 in a unanimous vote. Her candidacy emerged after a December 2020 Change.org petition made by female members of the PS asking Narváez to become the party's candidate was signed by former president Michelle Bachelet. In January 2021 both senator José Miguel Insulza and PS president Álvaro Elizalde dropped out of the race. On 5 June 2021 the PPD officially proclaimed her as its candidate.

==== Dropped out ====
- Heraldo Muñoz (PPD): The current president of the PPD and former minister of Foreign Affairs became the PPD candidate after beating former minister of Interior and spokesperson Francisco Vidal and former deputy for District 39 and ambassador Jorge Tarud by 54% of the vote in a primary held on 31 January 2021. On 19 May 2021 he dropped out of the race and lent his support to Narváez.
- Ximena Rincón (PDC): The current senator was proclaimed as the Christian Democratic Party's candidate for president after she beat former mayor and minister Alberto Undurraga in a primary held on 24 January 2021. She won by 57% of the vote. She officially dropped out of the race on 2 June 2021.
- Pablo Vidal (independent politician): The deputy quit the Democratic Revolution party in December 2020 and founded the New Deal (Nuevo Trato) political platform. On 13 April 2021, he was proclaimed as presidential candidate by the Liberal Party and New Deal. On 19 May 2021 he dropped out of the race and lent his support to Narváez.

=== Christian Social Front ===

Christian Social Front
José Antonio Kast
(Chilean Republican Party)

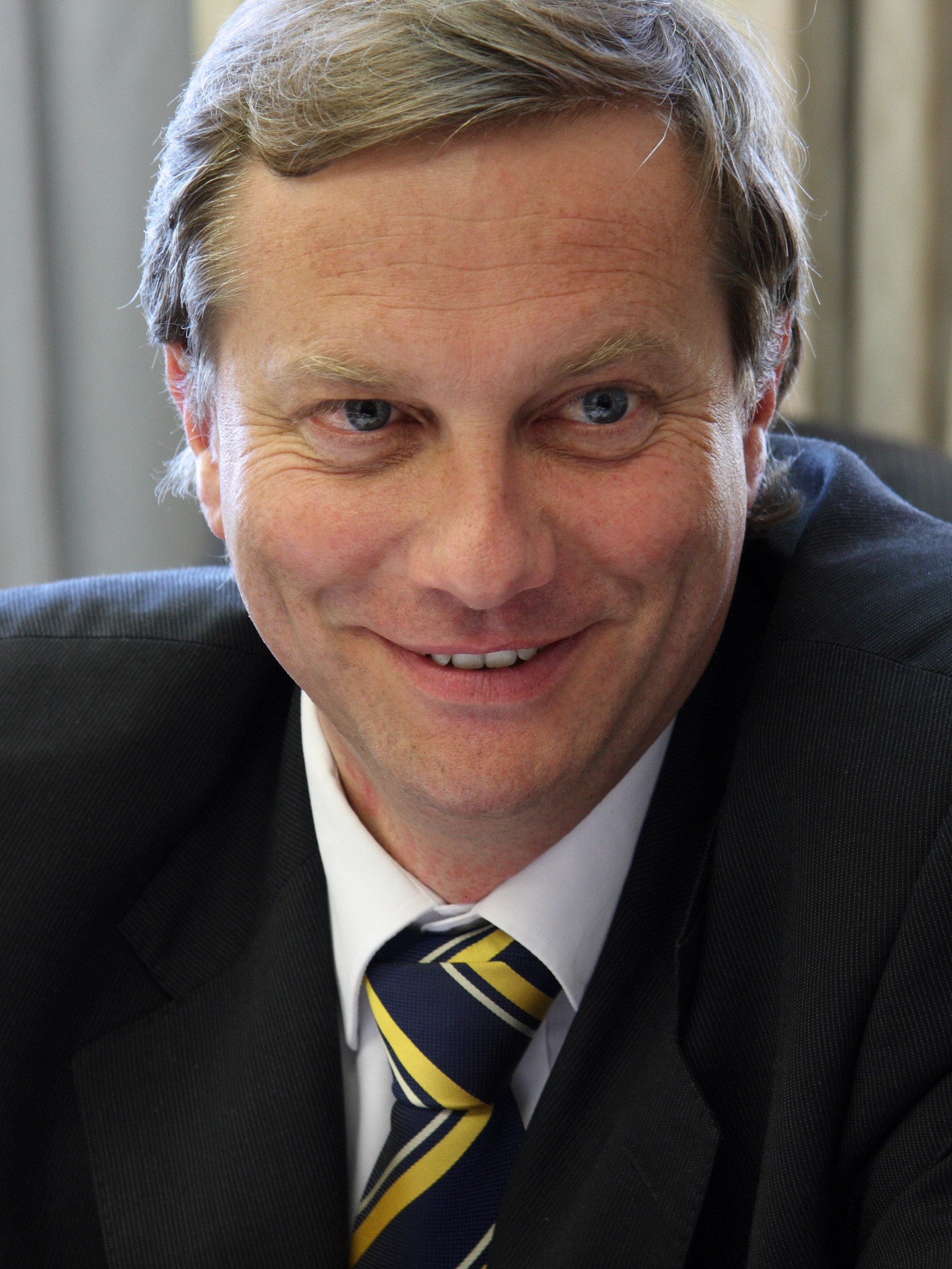

Deputy for La Reina and Peñalolén
(2002–2018)

In May 2021, José Antonio Kast dismissed the idea of holding a presidential primary with Chile Vamos. On August 6, 2021, the Christian Conservative Party, along with the Republican Party and other independents, registered the Christian Social Front pact with the Electoral Service for the parliamentary elections in November. Kast officially registered his candidacy before the Electoral Service on 19 August 2021.

=== Other candidates ===
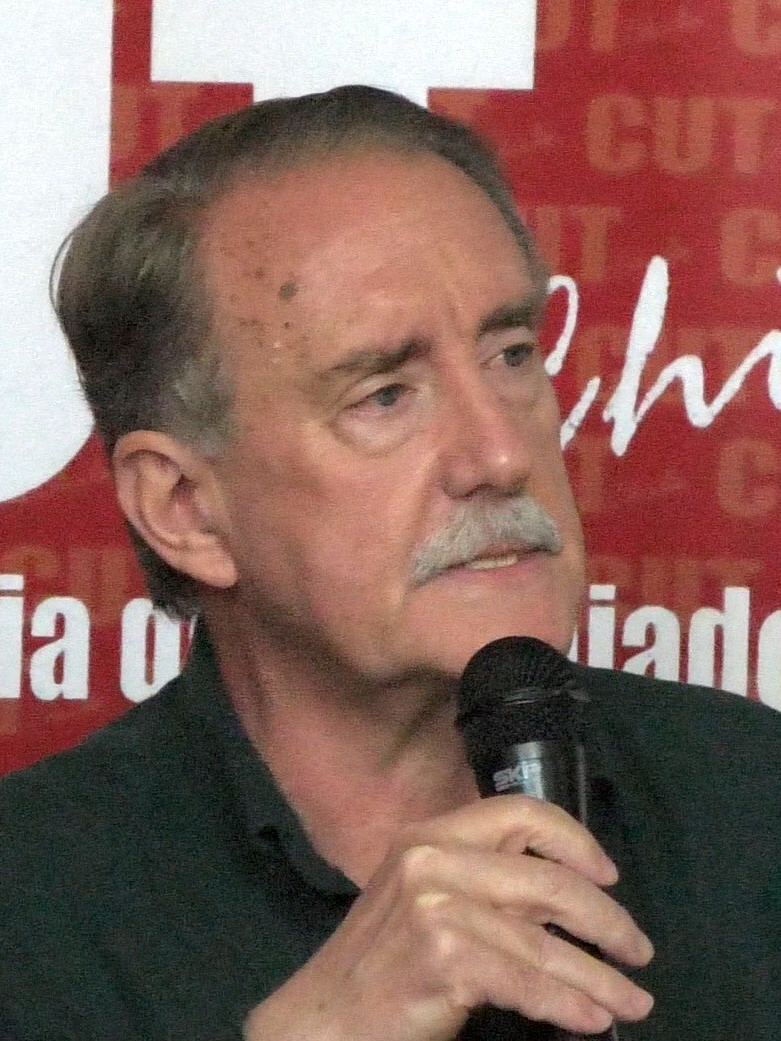
UP President
Eduardo Artés
(UP)

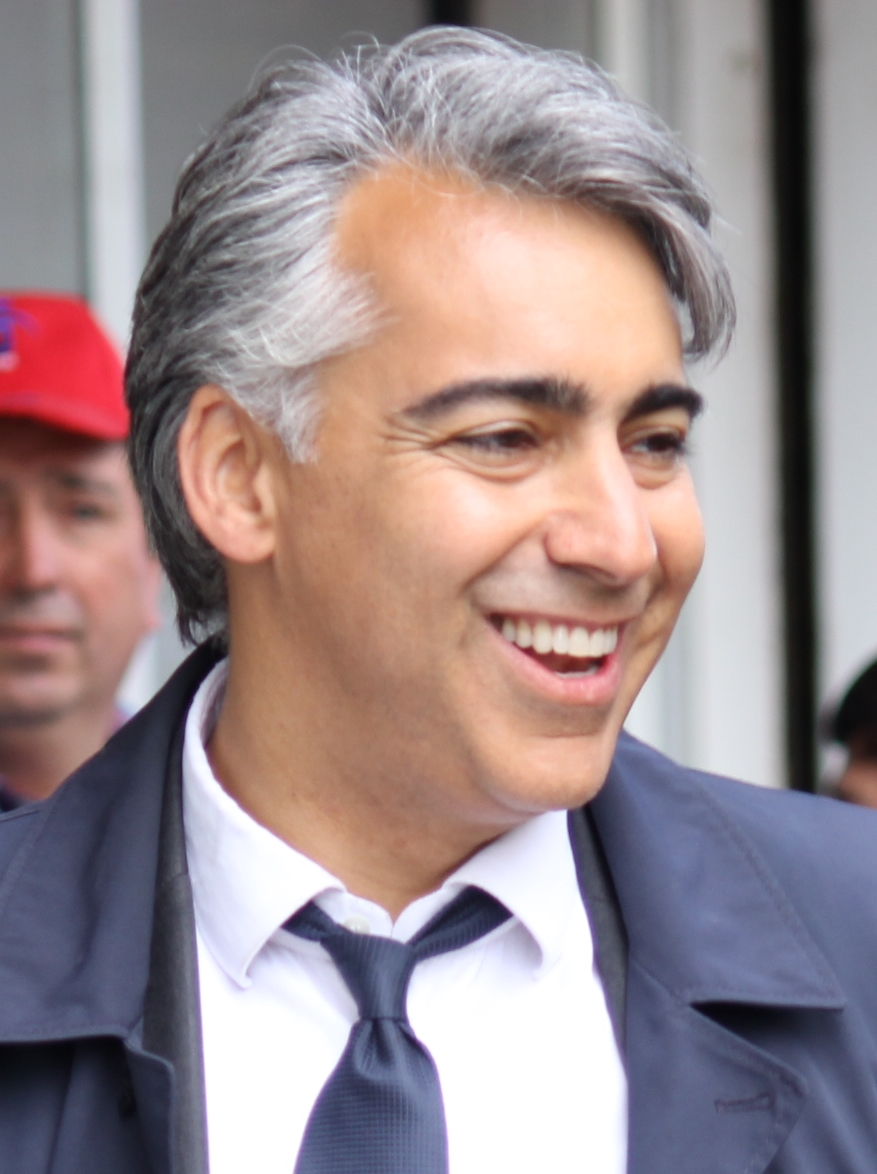
PRO leader
Marco Enríquez-O.
(PRO)

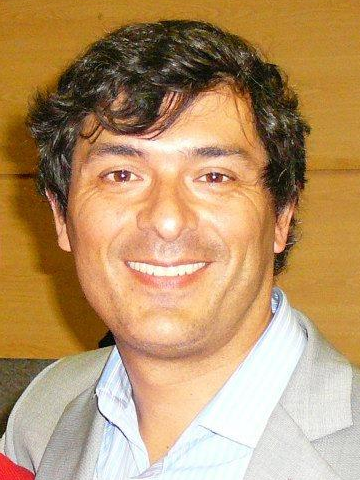
PDG leader
Franco Parisi
(PDG)
- Eduardo Artés (UP): The current president of the UP was confirmed by his party as its presidential candidate in June 2021.
- Marco Enríquez-Ominami (PRO): In February 2021, his party asked the three-time presidential candidate to be once again their contender for the November 2021 election. On 23 July PRO's president, Camilo Lagos, said they would either participate in a primary or present a candidate directly to the November election. If their preferred choice, Enríquez-Ominami, was unable to run due legal restrictions, he stated that they would support senator Alejandro Guillier as their candidate. On 26 July 2021 the PRO declared they would not participate in the Constituent Unity primary to take place on 21 August 2021. On 4 September 2021 a regional electoral tribunal (TER) ordered his name to be removed from the electoral roll, thus disqualifying him from seeking office. However, he appealed successfully to the Election Certification Board (Tricel).
- Franco Parisi (PDG): Parisi is an economist who ran for president in 2013, gaining 10% of the vote. He registered his candidacy for president on 23 August 2021.

=== Rejected ===
- Diego Ancalao (independent): Ancalao is a Mapuche activist. He was proclaimed on 20 August 2021 by the List of the People, a leftist movement, after he garnered more endorsements from independent electors at the Electoral Service's online platform than the other two candidates in competition, Soledad Mella and Ingrid Conejeros, between 12 and 19 August 2021. The Electoral Service, though, rejected his candidacy on 26 August 2021 on the grounds he did not provide the required minimum number of endorsements from independent electors.
- Gino Lorenzini (independent): Lorenzini is an economist and entrepreneur. He registered his candidacy for president on 23 August 2021, presenting over 42 thousand endorsements from independent electors, more than the minimum required by law. However, the Electoral Service rejected his candidacy on 26 August 2021 because the law requires independent candidates to hold their status as independent for up to a year before the election, and he was part of the Party of the People during some of that time.

=== Declined to be candidates ===
- Pamela Jiles (PH): Jiles is a journalist, television personality and leftist politician. She pursues her political career as deputy for District 12 in the Santiago Metropolitan Region. She comes from a family of communists and has praised Fidel Castro. She appeared as a potential presidential candidate with the most support in just one opinion poll. After her partner lost the Santiago governor race in May 2021, she withdrew her name from consideration.
- Izkia Siches (independent): Siches is a physician who has served as president of the Chilean Medical College since 2017. A self-described feminist and past member of the Communist Youth, Siches became nationally known during the COVID-19 pandemic for her criticisms of the government's handling of public health measures. Her high approval ratings during the pandemic led to speculation she would run for president, but she ultimately declined.
- René Rubeska (PNC): In June 2021, the National Citizen Party had announced its intention to bring its president René Rubeska as presidential candidate. However, the party was unable to gather the necessary signatures to register his candidacy.

== Debates ==
Media outlet and date	Location	Moderators	P Present S Substitute A Absent NI Not invited						
Media outlet and date	Location	Moderators	Boric	Kast	Provoste	Sichel	Artés	ME-O	Parisi
CNN Chile-Chilevisión; 22 September 2021	Santiago Metropolitan Region	Mónica Rincón; Daniel Matamala	P	P	P	P	P	A	A
La Tercera; Confederation of Production and Commerce; 24 September 2021	Santiago Metropolitan Region	María José O'Shea; Juan Sutil Servoin	A	P	P	P	A	A	A
TVN-24 Horas; Canal 13; Mega-Mega Plus; 11 October 2021	Santiago Metropolitan Region	Matías del Río Mónica Pérez Juan Manuel Astorga	P	P	P	P	P	P	A
Chilean Radio Broadcasters Association (Archi); 15 October 2021	Santiago Metropolitan Region	Jessika Casteñeda Cony Stipicic; Carolina Urrejola; Verónica Franco; Nicolás Vergara	P	P	P	P	P	P	A
La Red Escenarios Hídricos 2030; Fundación Chile; Fundación Avina; Fundación Futuro Latinoamericano; 21 October 2021	Santiago Metropolitan Region (Candidates remotely)	Julia Vial	P	A	P	P	A	P	P
University of Chile Debate 2021 (University of Chile, Radio Cooperativa, Radio UChile, UChile TV); 1 November 2021	Santiago Metropolitan Region	Ennio Vivaldi Sergio Campos; Yasna Lewin; Paula Molina; Jennifer Abate; Rodrigo Vergara; Antonella Estévez; Patricio López	P	A	P	P	P	P	A
Debate Es Turno del Planeta (Canal 13, El Desconcierto, Cobertura, CON-CIENCIA, Escazu Ahora Chile, Portada Soñada); 5 November 2021	Santiago Metropolitan Region (Candidates remotely)	Felipe Gerdtzen Andrea Obaid	P	A	P	P	P	P	P
Encuentro Nacional de la Empresa 11 November 2021	Santiago Metropolitan Region	Soledad Onetto	P	P	P	P	A	P	A
National Television Association (ANATEL); 15 November 2021	Santiago Metropolitan Region	Ivan Valenzuela; Constanza Santa María; Juan Manuel Astorga	P	P	P	P	P	P	A

== Endorsements ==
After the first round, candidates Sichel and Parisi endorsed Kast.

Boric was endorsed by Enríquez-Ominami and Provoste. Former President Michelle Bachelet returned to Chile from her role as UN Human Rights High Commissioner to formally endorse Boric.

On 9 December, parliamentarians and public figures from over 15 countries signed a statement endorsing Boric.

Gabriel Boric (CS)

Executive officials

- Michelle Bachelet, United Nations High Commissioner for Human Rights and former President of Chile
- Ricardo Lagos, former President of Chile

National officials

- Karol Cariola, Member of the Chamber of Deputies of Chile
- Marco Enríquez-Ominami, former Member of the Chamber of Deputies of Chile; former presidential candidate
- Yasna Provoste, President of the Senate of Chile; former presidential candidate

Local officials

- 110 mayors including:
  - Carla Amtmann of Valdivia
  - Emeterio Carrillo of Osorno
  - Claudio Castro of Renca
  - Petero Edmunds of Rapa Nui (Easter Island)
  - Gerardo Espíndola of Arica
  - Irací Hassler of Santiago
  - Carlos Gatica of Coyhaique
  - Daniel Jadue of Recoleta
  - Marcos López of Copiapó
  - Ali Manouchehri of Coquimbo
  - Roberto Neira of Temuco
  - Claudia Pizarro of La Pintana
  - Emilia Ríos of Ñuñoa
  - Macarena Ripamonti of Viña del Mar
  - Jorge Sharp of Valparaíso
  - Mauricio Soria of Iquique
  - Tomás Vodanovic of Maipú

Individuals

- Jorge Baradit, Chilean writer
- Laurent Binet, French writer
- Alfredo Castro, Chilean actor
- Noam Chomsky, American linguist and activist
- Costa-Gavras, Greek-French film director
- Ricardo Ffrench-Davis, Chilean economist
- León Gieco, Argentine singer-songwriter
- Stephany Griffith-Jones, Chilean-British economist
- Srećko Horvat, Croatian philosopher
- Illapu, Chilean folk band
- Nicolas Jaar, American artist
- Naomi Klein, Canadian author
- Denisse Malebrán, Chilean singer
- Toni Negri, Italian activist and philosopher
- Avi Lewis, Canadian author and activist
- Daniela Pardo, Chilean footballer
- Isabel Parra, Chilean musician
- Pedro Pascal, Chilean-American actor
- Roger Waters, British singer and bassist of Pink Floyd
- Vijay Prashad, Indian author and activist
- Ahdaf Soueif, Egyptian author and activist
- Ana Tijoux, Chilean musician
- Alejandro Zambra, Chilean writer
- Slavoj Žižek, Slovenian philosopher

International politicians

- José Mujica, former President of Uruguay
- Ali Al-Dailami, Member of the German Bundestag
- Celso Amorim, former Foreign Minister of Brazil
- Andrés Arauz, former Ecuadorian Minister of Knowledge and Human Talent
- Niki Ashton, Canadian Member of Parliament
- Alexandre Boulerice, Canadian Member of Parliament
- Richard Burgon, British Member of Parliament
- Alicia Castro, former Argentinian Ambassador to the United Kingdom
- Leïla Chaibi, Member of European Parliament for France
- Ada Colau, Mayor of Barcelona, Spain
- Jeremy Corbyn, British Member of Parliament and former Leader of the Labour Party (UK)
- Sevim Dağdelen, Member of the German Bundestag
- Leah Gazan, Canadian Member of Parliament
- Matthew Green, Canadian Member of Parliament
- John Hendy, Baron Hendy QC, Member of the British House of Lords
- Andrej Hunko, Member of the German Bundestag
- Scott Ludlam, former Australian Senator
- Jean-Luc Mélenchon, Member of the European Parliament for France
- Aloizio Mercadante, former Education Minister of Brazil
- Grahame Morris, British Member of Parliament
- Zaklin Nastic, Member of the German Bundestag
- Gerardo Pisarello, Member of the 13th Spanish Congress of Deputies
- Ernesto Samper, former President of Colombia
- Zarah Sultana, British Member of Parliament
- Rashida Tlaib, Member of the United States House of Representatives
- Yanis Varoufakis, Member of the Hellenic Parliament (Greece) and former Finance Minister
- Alexis Tsipras, Member of the Hellenic Parliament (Greece) and former Prime Minister of Greece
- Idoia Villanueva, Member of the European Parliament for Spain
- José Luis Rodríguez Zapatero, former Prime Minister of Spain

Organizations

- Democratic Socialists of America
José Antonio Kast (PLR)

Executive officials

- Raúl Figueroa, Minister of Education
- Sebastián Sichel, former Minister of Social Development and Family; former presidential candidate

Local officials

- Evelyn Matthei, Mayor of Providencia
- Joaquín Lavín, Mayor of Las Condes

Individuals

- Ena von Baer, Chilean senator
- Manuel José Ossandón, Chilean senator
- Johannes Kaiser, Chilean YouTuber and politician
- Franco Parisi, engineer and economist; former presidential candidate
- Marcelo Salas, footballer
- Marcelo Ríos, tennis player

International politicians

- Mario Vargas Llosa, 1st Marquis of Vargas Llosa, Spanish-Peruvian writer, politician and Nobel Prize winner.
- Eduardo Bolsonaro, Member of Chamber of Deputies of Brazil and son of Brazilian President Jair Bolsonaro
- Javier Milei, Member of the Argentine Chamber of Deputies
- Filip Dewinter, Member of the Flemish Parliament

Parties and orgnanisations

- KORWiN, Polish political party
- Vox, Spanish political party

== Opinion polls ==
=== First round ===
Results considering only official candidates (excluding "Other", "Don't know", "Do not vote", etc.) and general voters, excluding polls showing likely voters or non-national samples.

View source data.

=== Second round ===
Results considering only official candidates (excluding "Other", "Don't know", "Do not vote", etc.) and general voters, excluding polls only with likely voters. Average of polls every 3 days.

View source data.

== Public transport inefficiency ==
On the day of the second round on 19 December, voters at bus stops in rural parts of the country, and large municipalities in the Santiago Metropolitan Region, such as Puente Alto, San Bernardo, and Maipú, waited hours for public bus services in the blazing sun to reach their polling stations, due to a shortage of public bus services available on that day.

Soon after these reports came in, local authorities and citizens in these municipalities took to social media to show Red Metropolitana de Movilidad bus terminals and parking decks full of unused city buses. This led to speculation that the incumbent government was suppressing voters by reducing bus services to prevent them from casting their votes. Apparently, most complaints of delays came from neighborhoods where Gabriel Boric had stronger levels of support.

Leading figures from Boric's campaign, such as Izkia Siches cried foul, accusing the government of trying to help Kast win the election. Boric said "the government has a responsibility" to solve the problem to allow voters to be ferried to vote with the unused buses. The elections authority Servel expressed similar concerns to Transport Minister Gloria Hutt.

The government spokesman Jaime Bellolio called the Boric campaign's claim as a "blatant lie", and denied that the government was suppressing voters, claiming that there were between 5,000 and 6,000 buses running in the Metropolitan Region. However, this was contradicted by transport authorities, which stated that only 3,000 buses were operating. The transport authority however, also stressed that the number of buses was 55 percent more than a usual Sunday and between 3 percent or 4 percent greater than on the first round of election in November.

A Transantiago bus driver claimed that only 40 percent of the bus drivers available were driving that day, despite statements from the government that they were operating buses on a normal work schedule. As a result, carpools were organized through social media, while private services like Uber and Cabify offered ride discounts for voters to travel to polling stations.

In the evening, just before polls closed, Transport Minister Gloria Hutt apologized, acknowledging the government was slow to react to the situation and blamed the delays on road work and traffic, but denied that the government was engaging in voter suppression.

== Results ==
=== President ===
Turnout for the second round rose by 1.2 million from the first round, and from 47.3% in the first round to 55.6%, the highest level for any Chilean election since voting ceased to be compulsory in 2012.

Gabriel Boric won the election with 55.9% of the vote and became the youngest president in Chile's history and youngest state leader in the world.

A post-election survey showed that despite their endorsement of Kast, 59% of Parisi's voters and 23% of Sichel's voters voted for Boric, while 82% of Yasna Provoste's supporters, 83% of Marco Enríquez-Ominami's supporters, and 92% of Eduardo Artés's supporters voted for Boric.

Candidate	Party	First round		Second round	
Candidate	Party	Votes	%	Votes	%
José Antonio Kast	Christian Social Front (PLR)	1,961,779	27.91	3,650,088	44.13
Gabriel Boric	Apruebo Dignidad (CS)	1,815,024	25.82	4,620,890	55.87
Franco Parisi	Party of the People	900,064	12.81		
Sebastián Sichel	Chile Podemos Más	898,635	12.79		
Yasna Provoste	New Social Pact (PDC)	815,563	11.60		
Marco Enríquez-Ominami	Progressive Party	534,383	7.60		
Eduardo Artés	Patriotic Union (PC-AP)	102,897	1.46		
Total		7,028,345	100.00	8,270,978	100.00
Valid votes		7,028,345	98.79	8,270,978	98.89
Invalid votes		55,480	0.78	68,802	0.82
Blank votes		30,493	0.43	24,130	0.29
Total votes		7,114,318	100.00	8,363,910	100.00
Registered voters/turnout		15,030,974	47.33	15,030,974	55.64
Source: Election Certification Court (final first round results), Servel (final second round results)

=== Chamber of Deputies ===
Distribution by party (left) and coalitions (right)
Party or alliance		Votes	%	Seats	+/–
Chile Podemos Más	National Renewal	693,474	10.96	25	–11
Chile Podemos Más	Independent Democratic Union	671,502	10.61	23	–7
Chile Podemos Más	Evópoli	221,284	3.50	4	–2
Chile Podemos Más	Democratic Independent Regionalist Party	23,222	0.37	1	+1
Chile Podemos Más	Total	1,609,482	25.43	53	–19
Apruebo Dignidad	Comunes	207,607	3.28	6	+5
Apruebo Dignidad	Communist Party	464,885	7.35	12	+4
Apruebo Dignidad	Social Convergence	287,190	4.54	9	New
Apruebo Dignidad	Democratic Revolution	257,854	4.07	8	–2
Apruebo Dignidad	Social Green Regionalist Federation	107,696	1.70	2	–2
Apruebo Dignidad	Total	1,325,232	20.94	37	+14
New Social Pact	Socialist Party	343,437	5.43	13	–6
New Social Pact	Christian Democratic Party	264,985	4.19	8	–6
New Social Pact	Party for Democracy	242,927	3.84	7	–1
New Social Pact	Radical Party	111,117	1.76	4	–4
New Social Pact	Liberal Party	96,010	1.52	4	+2
New Social Pact	Citizens	27,502	0.43	1	+1
New Social Pact	Total	1,085,978	17.16	37	–14
Christian Social Front	Republican Party	666,726	10.54	14	New
Christian Social Front	Christian Conservative Party	40,560	0.64	1	New
Christian Social Front	Total	707,286	11.18	15	New
Party of the People		534,881	8.45	6	New
Dignidad Ahora	Humanist Party	195,409	3.09	3	–2
Dignidad Ahora	Equality Party	127,506	2.01	0	–1
Dignidad Ahora	Total	322,915	5.10	3	–3
Green Ecologist Party		305,443	4.83	2	+1
United Independents	United Centre	177,105	2.80	1	New
United Independents	National Citizen Party	10,291	0.16	0	New
United Independents	Total	187,396	2.96	1	New
Patriotic Union		56,506	0.89	0	0
Revolutionary Workers Party		51,075	0.81	0	0
Progressive Party		46,422	0.73	0	–1
New Time		4,420	0.07	0	New
Independents		90,960	1.44	1	0
Total		6,327,996	100.00	155	0
Valid votes		6,327,996	89.48		
Invalid votes		339,470	4.80		
Blank votes		404,762	5.72		
Total votes		7,072,228	100.00		
Registered voters/turnout		15,030,963	47.05		
Source: Servicio Electoral de Chile. (99.98%)

=== Senate ===
Seat distribution by party (left) and coalitions (right)
Party or alliance		Votes	%	Seats		
Party or alliance		Votes	%	Won	Not up	Total
Chile Podemos Más	National Renewal	549,553	11.80	5	6	12
Chile Podemos Más	Evópoli	368,024	7.90	2	2	3
Chile Podemos Más	Independent Democratic Union	354,812	7.62	5	4	9
Chile Podemos Más	Democratic Independent Regionalist Party	25,297	0.54	0	0	0
Chile Podemos Más	Total	1,297,686	27.86	12	12	24
Apruebo Dignidad	Communist Party	335,709	7.21	2	0	2
Apruebo Dignidad	Social Green Regionalist Federation	188,308	4.04	2	0	2
Apruebo Dignidad	Comunes	172,054	3.69	0	0	0
Apruebo Dignidad	Democratic Revolution	156,256	3.35	0	1	1
Apruebo Dignidad	Social Convergence	59,489	1.28	0	0	0
Apruebo Dignidad	Total	911,716	19.57	4	1	5
New Social Pact	Socialist Party	314,114	6.74	4	3	7
New Social Pact	Christian Democratic Party	214,180	4.60	2	3	5
New Social Pact	Party for Democracy	111,910	2.40	2	4	6
New Social Pact	Radical Party	58,077	1.25	0	0	0
New Social Pact	Liberal Party	28,082	0.60	0	0	0
New Social Pact	Total	726,363	15.59	8	10	18
Christian Social Front	Republican Party	336,305	7.22	1	0	1
Christian Social Front	Christian Conservative Party	65,262	1.40	0	0	0
Christian Social Front	Total	401,567	8.62	1	0	1
Party of the People		378,378	8.12	0	0	0
Green Ecologist Party		198,710	4.27	0	0	0
United Independents	United Centre	158,134	3.39	0	0	0
United Independents	National Citizen Party	7,174	0.15	0	0	0
United Independents	Total	165,308	3.55	0	0	0
Dignidad Ahora	Equality Party	82,785	1.78	0	0	0
Dignidad Ahora	Humanist Party	15,916	0.34	0	0	0
Dignidad Ahora	Total	98,701	2.12	0	0	0
Patriotic Union		41,155	0.88	0	0	0
Revolutionary Workers Party		4,802	0.10	0	0	0
Independents		433,448	9.31	2	0	2
Total		4,657,934	100.00	27	23	50
Valid votes		4,657,934	90.99			
Invalid votes		227,995	4.45			
Blank votes		233,086	4.55			
Total votes		5,119,015	100.00			
Registered voters/turnout		15,030,963	34.06			
Source: Servicio Electoral de Chile

=== Regional Boards ===
Note: Provisional results, including 99.97% of ballot boxes.

Party or alliance		Votes	%	Seats
Chile Vamos	RN and independents	702,607	11.45	53
Chile Vamos	UDI and independents	680,283	11.09	43
Constituent Unity	PS and independents	358,207	5.84	23
Constituent Unity	PPD and independents	234,242	3.82	19
Constituent Unity	Total	592,449	9.66	42
Frente Amplio	CS and independents	217,259	3.54	10
Frente Amplio	RD and independents	250,324	4.08	12
Frente Amplio	PLC and independents	9,414	0.15	0
Frente Amplio	Comunes and independents	95,144	1.55	3
Frente Amplio	Total	572,141	9.33	25
For a Dignified Chile	PCCh and independents	448,137	7.30	21
For a Dignified Chile	Equality for Chile	102,293	1.67	3
For a Dignified Chile	Total	550,430	8.97	24
Citizen Democracy	PDC and independents	489,894	7.99	36
Citizen Democracy	Citizens and independents	30,077	0.49	0
Citizen Democracy	Total	519,971	8.48	36
Party of the People		474,132	7.73	22
Republicans and independents		470,514	7.67	15
Ecologists and independents		315,682	5.15	6
Chile Vamos	Evópoli and independents	274,072	4.47	11
Progressive Radical Change	PR and independents	173,882	2.83	11
Progressive Radical Change	PRO and independents	80,700	1.32	1
Progressive Radical Change	Total	254,582	4.15	12
Green Regionalists and independents		232,144	3.78	7
Let's Humanize Chile		106,790	1.74	0
Chile Vamos	PRI and independents	144,028	2.35	3
United Independents		79,251	1.29	0
Patriotic Union		41,344	0.67	0
Working Class Unity Front		36,706	0.60	0
Christian Conservative Party and independents		21,338	0.35	0
New Time		1,160	0.02	0
Independents		65,510	1.07	3
Total		6,135,134	100.00	302
Valid votes		6,135,134	86.88	
Invalid votes		381,731	5.41	
Blank votes		544,849	7.72	
Total votes		7,061,714	100.00	
Source: Servicio Electoral de Chile

== Aftermath ==
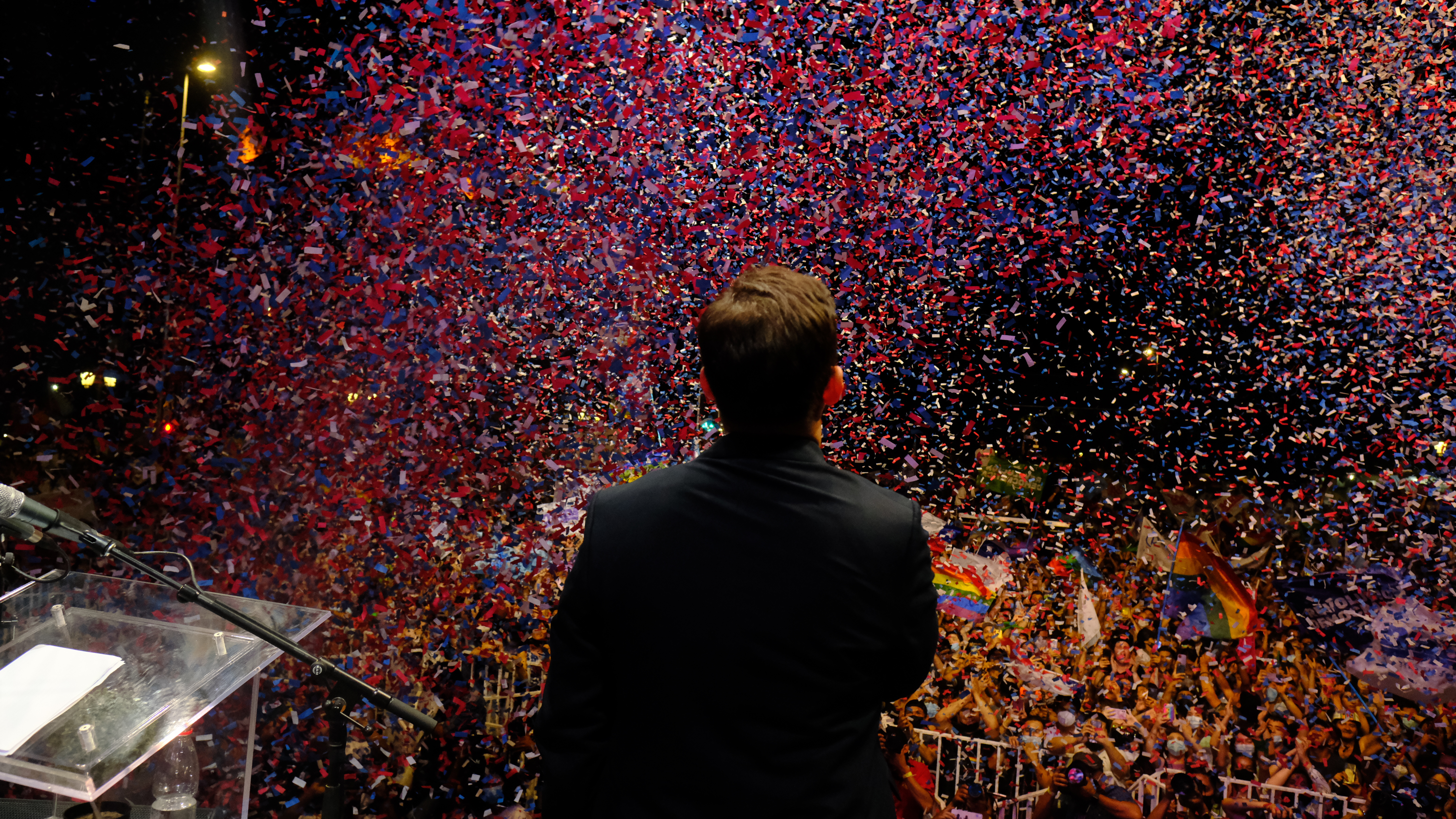

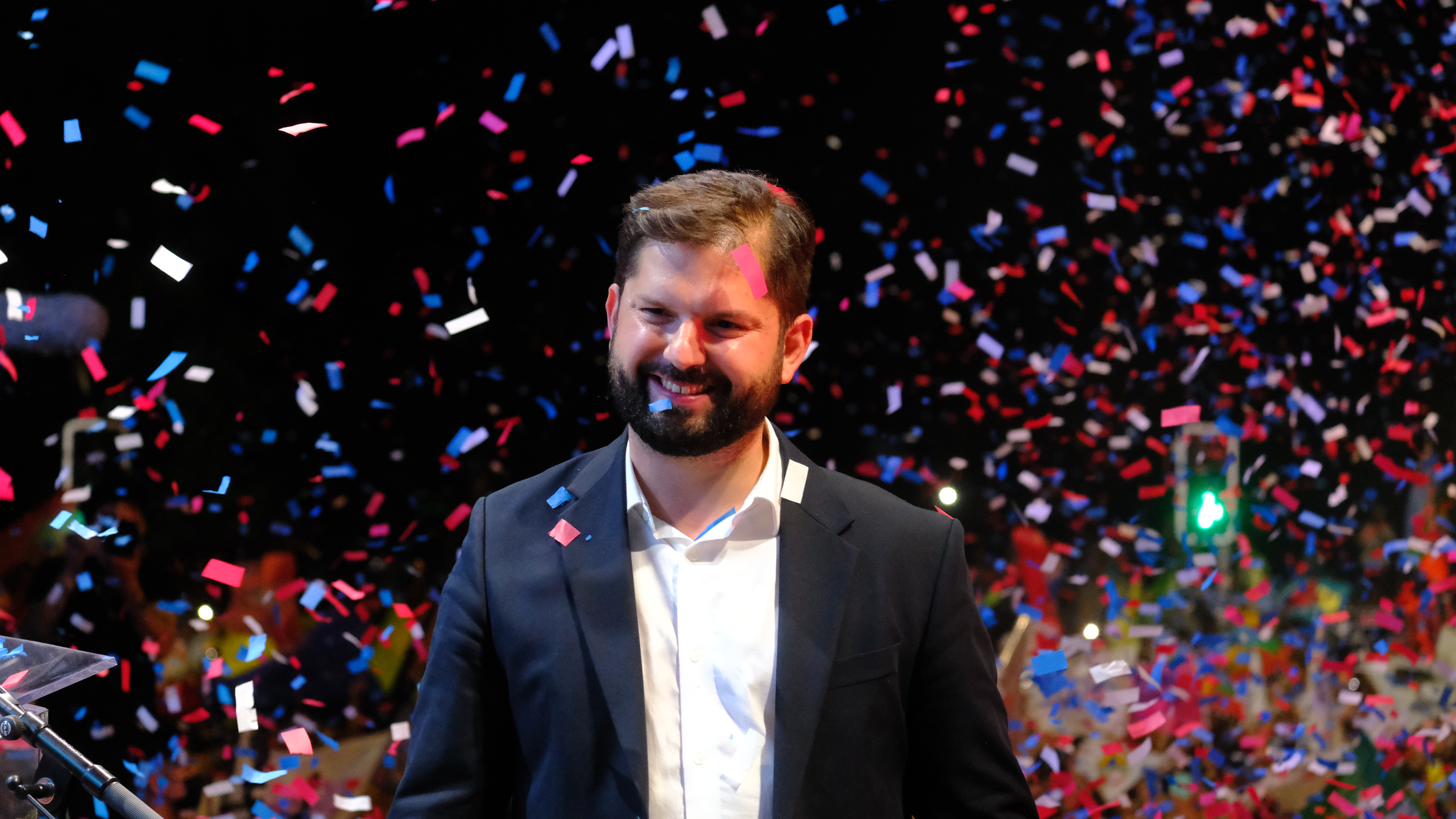
Gabriel Boric's victory celebration in the Alameda.

On 19 December 2021, shortly after the preliminary results of the second round were publicized, Kast conceded defeat and congratulated Boric through a tweet saying "I have just talked to Gabriel Boric and have congratulated him for his big triumph. From now on he is the president-elect of Chile and deserves all of our respect and constructive collaboration. Chile is always first". Later that day, Kast visited Boric at the latter's campaign headquarters in central Santiago. Boric thanked Kast during his victory speech, saying "we must build bridges for our compatriots to live better, because that is the people of Chile's demand".

Outgoing president Sebastián Piñera had a video call with president-elect Boric, which was broadcast live on TV and radio, complying with one of the country's electoral traditions since the transition to democracy. During their conversation, Piñera congratulated Boric and said "when we divide [our country] in wars between ourselves, things always go wrong. We all hope you make a very good government for Chile and the Chileans and I am sure you will do your best". Boric said "I am going to be the President of all Chileans, because I believe it is important to interpret everyone and agreements should be between all of the people and not inside four walls".

Boric was also congratulated by President of the Constitutional Convention, Elisa Loncón. The leader of Coordinadora Arauco-Malleco, Héctor Llaitul, dismissed Boric as being together with Kast "two faces of the same coin" and warned that Boric will maintain "the colonial-format capitalist system". Llaitul pledged to continue "the path of revolutionary autonomism".

=== International reaction ===
Among international leaders who congratulated Boric are President of Argentina Alberto Fernández, Vice President Cristina Kirchner, President of Bolivia Luis Arce, President of the Chamber of Senators of Bolivia Andrónico Rodríguez, former President of Brazil Lula da Silva, President of Colombia Iván Duque, President of Costa Rica Carlos Alvarado, President of Ecuador Guillermo Lasso, Prime Minister of Spain Pedro Sánchez, US Secretary of State Antony Blinken, Minister for Europe and Foreign Affairs of France Jean-Yves Le Drian, Mayor of Paris Anne Hidalgo, President of Mexico Andrés Manuel López Obrador and his Foreign Secretary Marcelo Ebrard, President of Peru Pedro Castillo, President of Uruguay Luis Lacalle Pou, President of Venezuela Nicolás Maduro, and opposition leaders of Venezuela Juan Guaidó and Henrique Capriles. The European Union, via its High Representative of the Union for Foreign Affairs and Security Policy Josep Borrell, also congratulated Boric on his victory in the second round and pointed to "strengthening" relations with the Chilean government.

President of Brazil Jair Bolsonaro had a late and cold reaction to Boric's election. He pointed out that "half of the population abstained" in the election, and referred to Boric as "that Boric". (Note: Prior to his election, Boric had criticized Bolsonaro's positions on the military dictatorship in Brazil (1964–1985) and called him "a danger for the environment and for humanity". Bolsonaro has made it a custom to react late to the election of left-wing presidents in the region, as he did with Alberto Fernández in Argentina.) Boric responded to Bolsonaro's comments by stating that "clearly we are very different". Bolsonaro's son Eduardo, who had supported Kast, had a harsher reaction, stating that Chile was set on a path similar to Maduro's Venezuela with Boric. He mentioned the –8% drop that occurred in the Santiago Stock Exchange following the election and linked Boric to the violence that erupted in Chile in 2019.

President of the United States Joe Biden had a phone conversation with president-elect Boric on 30 December, on which Biden congratulated Boric for his victory. In a press statement published by the White House, Biden "applauded Chile's free and fair elections as a powerful example to the region and the world", and also underscored the cooperation between Chile and the U.S. to "promote a green and equitable recovery from the COVID-19 pandemic and to address the existential threat posed by climate change". Biden also sent through the president-elect his condolences for the death of 14-year old Valentina Orellana-Peralta, who was killed in a police shootout at Los Angeles, California on 23 December. Boric later posted on his Twitter account about the conversation he had with President Biden, stating that "In addition to the shared joy for our respective electoral victories, we talked about common challenges such as fair trade, climate crisis and strengthening democracy. We will continue to talk."

=== Parliamentary results ===
Due to the low results in the parliamentary election, 12 political parties were dissolved by the Electoral Service: Christian Conservative Party (1 deputy), Citizens (1), Democratic Independent Regionalist Party (1), Equality Party, Green Ecological Party (2), Humanist Party (3), Progressive Party, National Citizen Party, New Time, Patriotic Union, Revolutionary Workers Party and United Centre (1). 9 deputies became independent politicians before joining the new Congress.

== See also ==
- LVI legislative period of the Chilean Congress
- List of female Chilean presidential candidates
