= Virginia Reginato =

Chilean politician

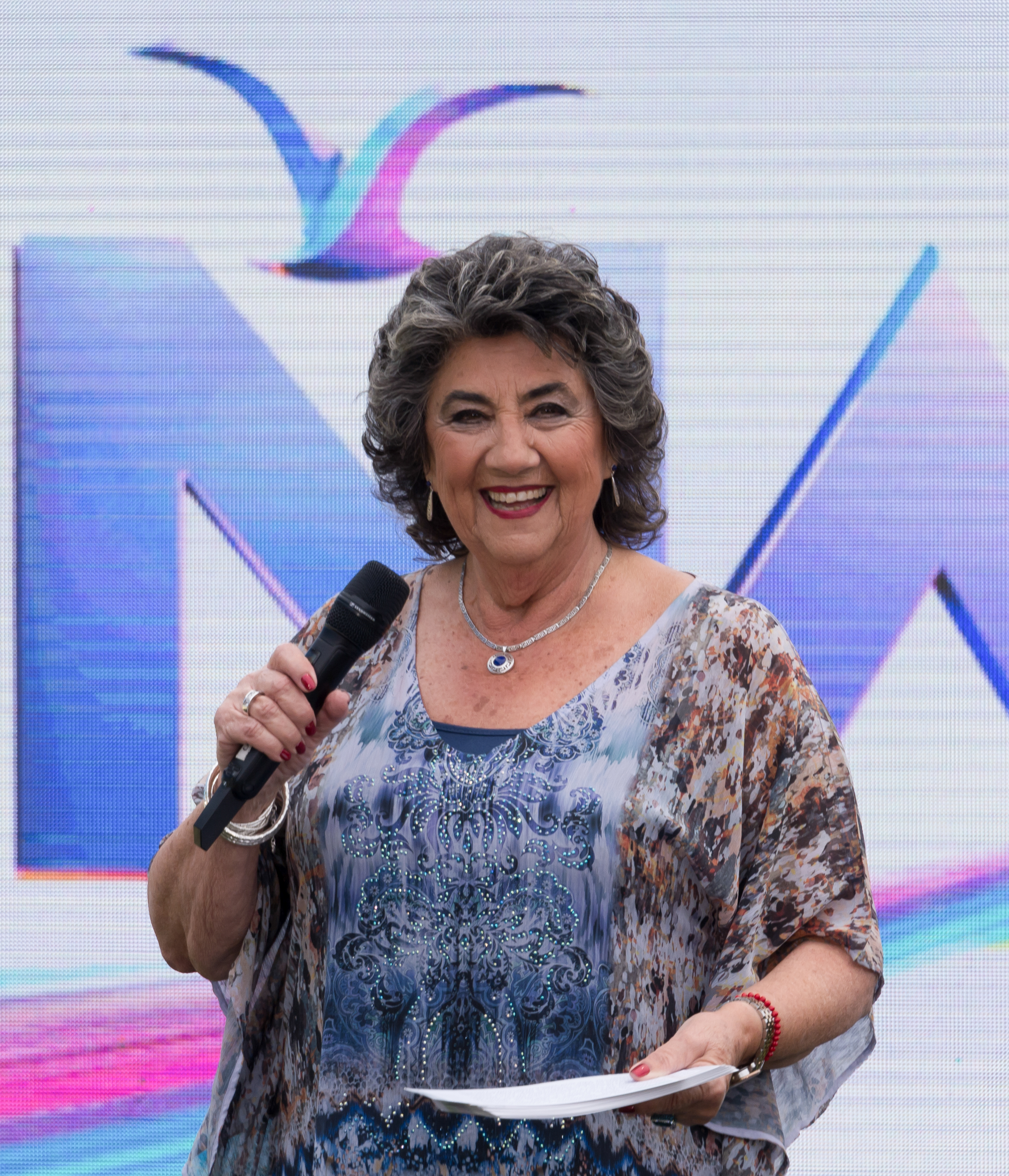
- December 2018

Councillor of Viña del Mar
- In office 28 June 2021 – 15 August 2021
- In office 26 September 1992 – 6 December 2004

Mayor of Viña del Mar
- In office 6 December 2004 – 28 June 2021
- Preceded by: Jorge Kaplán
- Succeeded by: Macarena Ripamonti

Personal details
- Born: Virginia María del Carmen Reginato Bozzo; 16 July 1939 (age 87) Valparaíso, Chile
- Party: Independent Democratic Union
- Spouse: Juan Gray
- Children: 2
- Occupation: Politician
- Website: www.virginiareginato.cl

Virginia María del Carmen Reginato Bozzo (born 16 July 1939) is a Chilean politician. A member of the Independent Democratic Union (UDI) party, she formerly served as mayor of the city of Viña del Mar.

From 1992 to 2004, she served as a councillor, and in 2004 was elected for the first time to lead the municipality for a four-year term. In the 2008 municipal elections, she was re-elected with the top national majority in votes (107,355) and the sixth largest percentage, with 78.76%. She is popularly known as "Tía Coty" (Aunt Coty).

== Biography ==
Born on 16 July 1939 in Valparaíso, she lived in the Playa Ancha area until age three, when her parents moved to Viña del Mar.

While her official biography states that she studied at the Scuola Italiana and the College of the French Nuns of Valparaíso, her formal education is known to have reached the third grade, and in 2007 she passed her basic and secondary education through free exams at El Sembrador de Colina school. This validation of studies has been questioned for having been allegedly carried out in a day, and deputies filed a complaint against Reginato in 2013 for falsification of a public instrument, an accusation which was dismissed.

During her youth she was a beauty queen five times – at the centenary celebrations of the Sixth Fire Company of Valparaiso, the Red Cross carnival, the Società Canotieri Italiani, the Scuola Italiana kermesse, and the first International Industrial Fair.

[It was] an event that was held at the Casino, where each exhibitor had a candidate. I was attending my family's stand and I came out queen by one vote, which was not bad, since it was put out in the defunct Valparaiso newspaper La Union.

— Virginia Reginato

She married Juan Gray, with whom she had two children, Verónica and Ricardo.

== Political career ==
=== Roles during the military dictatorship and councillor ===
A sympathizer of the right, her political career began as a volunteer at the National Secretariat for Women in 1975, an institution where she later served as the communal secretary of Viña del Mar (1981) and provincial secretary of Valparaíso (1982). She joined the Community Development Council (CODECO) of the Municipality of Viña del Mar from 1983 to 1988. She later served as regional secretary of the National Secretariat for Women.

In the municipal elections of 1992, she was elected as a councillor for Viña del Mar. She was reelected in 1996 and 2000, fulfilling this function until 2004.

=== Mayor of Viña del Mar ===
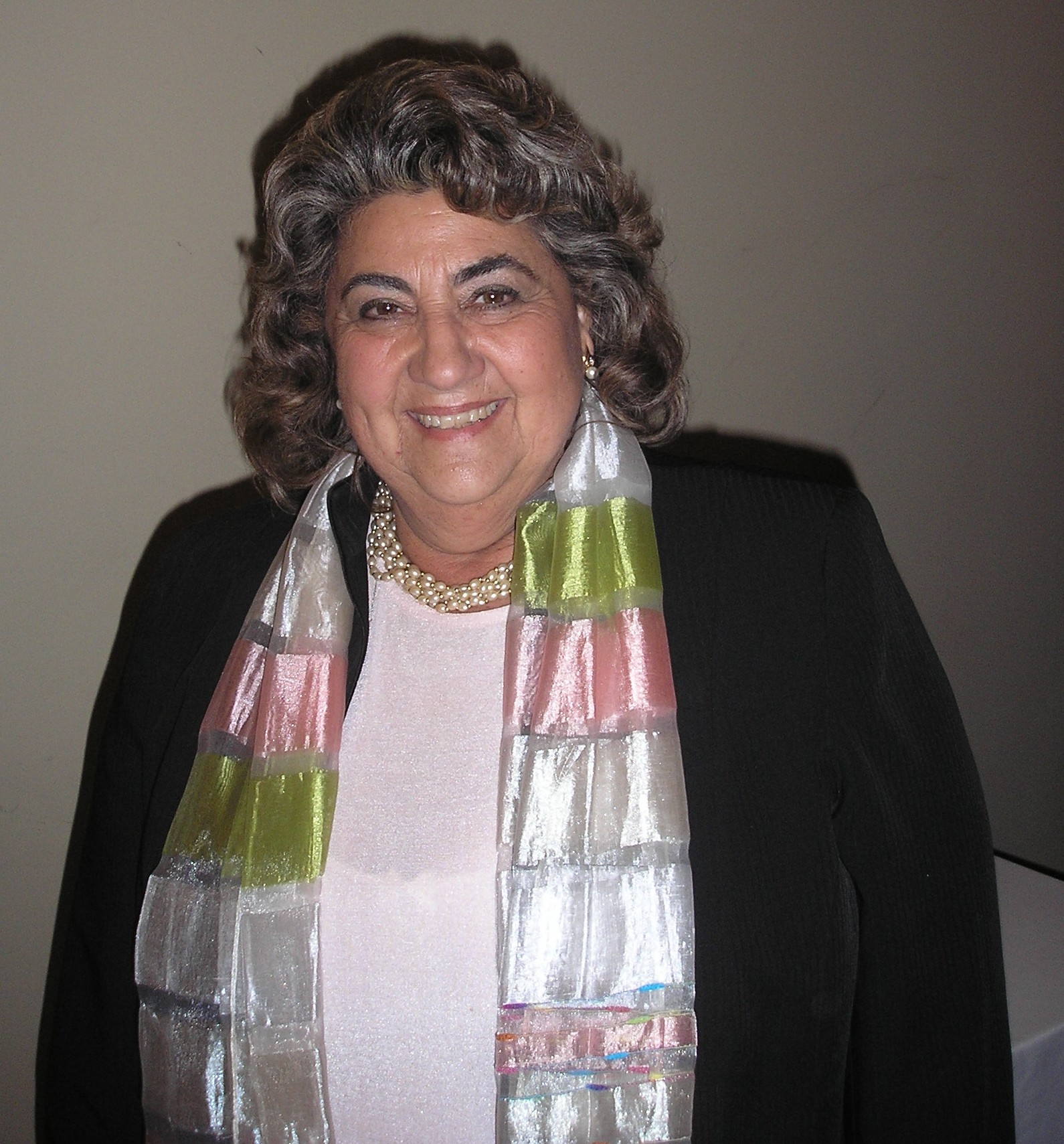
Reginato in 2008

In the municipal elections of 2004 she defeated incumbent mayor Dr. Jorge Kaplán with 47.88% of the votes, becoming the first woman in the city to attain the position through the electoral process, and the second after Eugenia Garrido, a councillor appointed by the military regime.

Her administration emphasized the tourist image of Viña del Mar, the social development of the most vulnerable sectors of the municipality, as well as implementing an extensive citizen security program and bidding for organizing rights for the Viña del Mar International Song Festival.

In the municipal elections of 2008 she obtained 78.84% of the votes, being re-elected as mayor of Viña del Mar for the term 2008–2012, with the top national majority and the most votes of any woman mayor in the country, with 107,355. In 2012 and 2016 she was also re-elected to the position, for the terms 2012–2016 and 2016–2020, after which she will have served 16 years in the mayor's office of the so-called "garden city".
