= Christian Social Front =

Defunct political coalition in Chile (2021–2022)

Christian Social Front Frente Social Cristiano
- Abbreviation: FSC
- Leader: José Antonio Kast
- Founders: José Antonio Kast; Antaris Varela
- Founded: 6 August 2021
- Dissolved: 3 February 2022
- Succeeded by: Change for Chile
- Ideology: National conservatism Economic liberalism Christian right Anti-communism
- Political position: Far-right
- Coalition members: Republican Party; Christian Conservative Party
- Colours: Blue and red
- Constitutional Convention: 4 / 155
- Chamber of Deputies: 15 / 155
- Senate: 1 / 43

Website
- Facebook page

The Christian Social Front (Spanish: Frente Social Cristiano, FSC) was a Chilean far-right electoral coalition formally created on 6 August 2021, between the Republican Party and the Christian Conservative Party for the 2021 general elections.

== History ==
=== Background ===
On 11 January 2021, the Republican Party, together with Chile Vamos, registered a list called "Vamos por Chile" for the Constitutional Convention election, thus being the only right-wing list versus several left-wing lists. This partnership has generated an impact within the same coalition, especially the candidate to conventional district 10 Teresa Marinovic (entering as a separate quota of National Renewal), which according to people of National Renewal and Political Evolution, his name did not appear in any of the thirteen candidates that the Republican Party filed in the general councils of each group.

The controversy deepened when his partner list Sylvia Eyzaguirre presented his resignation to his candidacy as a constituent of the president of National Renewal Rafael Prohens, arguing that it does not meet the conditions specified at the time of agreeing to be a candidate —alluding to Marinovic was not considered in the list at that time— and that he did not want to compete on the same list with someone who had values contrary to those of her. However, his resignation required the signature of all the presidents of the parties that made up Vamos por Chile so his name would appear in the same way on the ballot and he decided to campaign in the same way.

=== Registration ===
After the results obtained in the mega elections of May 2021, José Antonio Kast discarded the idea of making a presidential primary together with Chile Vamos while several of the ruling party discussed whether the incorporation of the Republican Party harmed them more than favoring them and whether it was prudent to continue with the pact called "Vamos por Chile" in presidential primaries and in the parliamentary elections.

Finally, on 6 August 2021, the Christian Conservative Party together with the Republican Party and independents registered with the Chilean Electoral Service as the coalition Christian Social Front for the parliamentary elections of November of that same year, while in the elections of regional councilors they will each go on an individual list.

The coalition formally ceased to exist in February 2022 when the PCC did not reach enough votes to maintain its legality.

== Composition ==
It was made up of the following parties:

Party	Abbr.	Ideology	Political position	Leader
Republican Party; Partido Republicano	PLR	Right-wing populism National conservatism	Far-right	José Antonio Kast
Christian Conservative Party; Partido Conservador Cristiano	PCC	Christian right National conservatism	Far-right	Antaris Varela
