= Christian Conservative Party (Chile) =

Chilean political party

Christian Conservative Party Partido Conservador Cristiano
- Abbreviation: CCP
- President: Antaris Varela
- Secretary-General: Esteban Pérez
- Vice President: María Jose Iturra
- Founded: 9 January 2020
- Legalized: 30 October 2020
- Dissolved: February 2022
- Split from: National Renewal
- Succeeded by: Christian Social Party
- Headquarters: Los Onas 426, Coronel, Chile
- Membership (2021): 3369
- Ideology: Christian right National conservatism Anti-communism
- Political position: Right-wing
- National affiliation: Christian Social Front (2021–2022)
- Colours: Blue
- Slogan: "Being salt and light" (Spanish: "Siendo sal y luz")
- Chamber of Deputies: 1 / 155
- Senate: 0 / 43

Website
- partidoconservadorcristiano.cl

The Christian Conservative Party (Spanish: Partido Conservador Cristiano, PCC) was an Evangelical political party in Chile. It was officially recognized by the Electoral Service of Chile (Servel) on 30 October 2020.

The origins of the party date back to 2001, when the "Águilas de Jesús" movement emerged at the University of Concepción in order to compete for political spaces in the university. It was placed on the right-wing of the political spectrum.

In 2021 the Christian Conservative Party formed a coalition called the Christian Social Front with the Republican Party, and supported the Republican Party presidential candidate, José Antonio Kast. The party was dissolved in February 2022 because it did not receive at least 5% of the votes in the 2021 parliamentary elections to maintain its legality. Its members in the Chamber of Deputies thereafter sat as independents.

== Presidential candidates ==
The following is a list of the presidential candidates supported by the Christian Conservative Party. (Information gathered from the Archive of Chilean Elections).

- 2021: José Antonio Kast (lost)

== Electoral history ==
=== Congress election ===
Election year	Chamber of Deputies			Senate			Status
Election year	# Votes	% Votes	Seats	# Votes	% Votes	Seats	Status
2021	40,560	0.64	1 / 155	65.262	1.40%	0 / 50	Opposition
