= Macarena Ripamonti =

Chilean politician

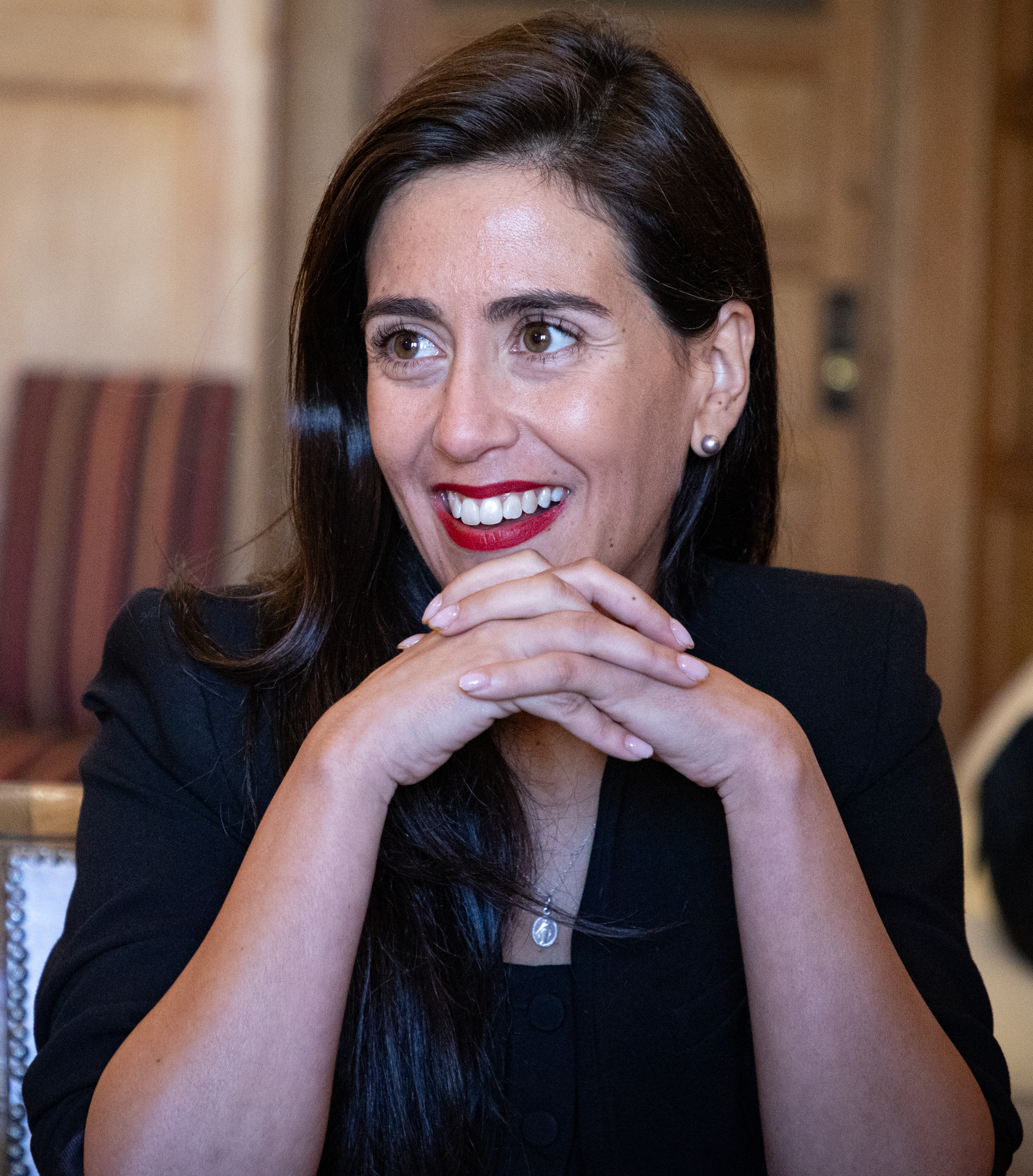
- Ripamonti in 2026

Mayor of Viña del Mar
- Incumbent
- Assumed office 30 June 2021
- Preceded by: Virginia Reginato

Personal details
- Born: Macarena Carolina Molina Ripamonti; 11 July 1991 (age 35) Viña del Mar, Chile
- Party: Broad Front (since 2024)
- Other political affiliations: Democratic Revolution (until 2024)
- Education: University of Viña del Mar (LL.B); University of Valparaíso (MA in Philosophy)
- Occupation: Politician
- Profession: Lawyer

Macarena Carolina Ripamonti Serrano (born Macarena Carolina Molina Ripamonti; 11 July 1991) is a Chilean politician. She is the mayor of Viña del Mar.

In 2024 she was re-elected as mayor of Viña after beating Iván Poduje.

== Political positions ==
She endorsed Gabriel Boric in the 2021 Chilean general election.
