= Leïla Chaibi =

French politician (born 1982)

Leïla Chaibi MEP
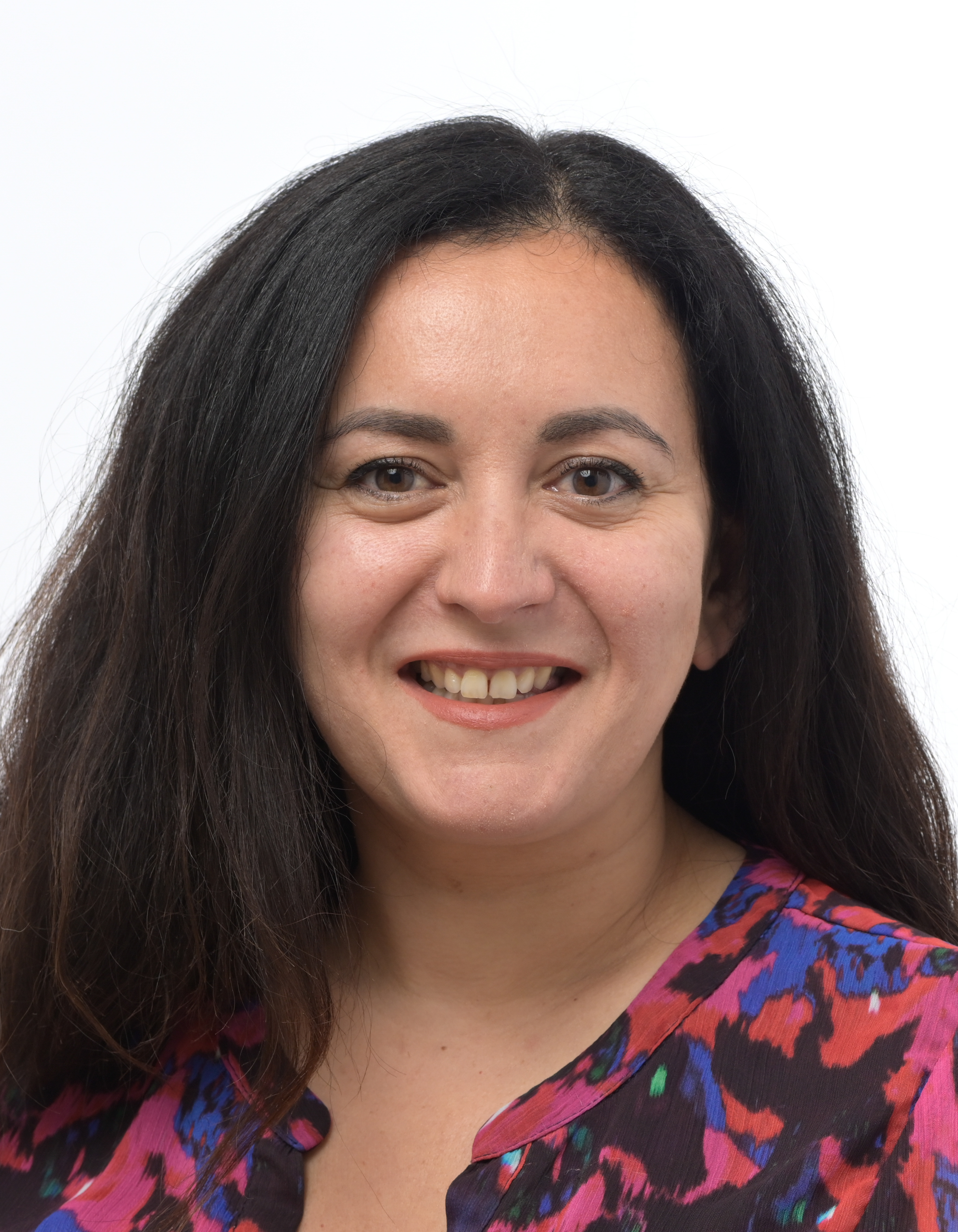

Member of the European Parliament for France
- Incumbent
- Assumed office 2 July 2019

Personal details
- Born: 5 October 1982 (age 43) Dijon, France
- Party: NPA (2009-2011); Left Party (since 2011); La France insoumise (since 2016)
- Education: Institute of Political Studies of Toulouse

Leïla Chaibi (born 5 October 1982) is a French left-wing politician. She was elected as a Member of the European Parliament in 2019 on the list of La France Insoumise, and was re-elected in 2024. She presides over La France Insoumise's delegation in the European Parliament.

== Early life and education ==
Leïla Chaibi was born in Dijon on 5 October 1982. She grew up in a residential neighborhood in Toulouse. Her mother, from Vendée, is a professor of health and economics and her father, of Tunisian origin, is an engineer.

She studied at the Mirail Rive-Gauche high school in Toulouse. She then pursued her undergraduate studies at the Toulouse Institute of Political Science, from which she graduated in 2005.

== Early career ==
Alongside her political activities, Leïla Chaibi took on several temporary jobs. In 2014, she began working at the Paris town hall. From 2015 to 2018, she served as the coordinator of youth initiatives for the city of Gennevilliers, before becoming the head of community life and citizenship for the department of Stains.

== Political activism ==
=== Beginnings ===
During her studies, Leïla Chaibi was a member of the SUD Étudiant student union. She participated in the demonstrations following the qualification of far-right Jean-Marie Le Pen for the runoff election of the 2002 French presidential elections. She also took part in the counter-globalization movement of the early 2000s, notably the 2003 G8 counter-summit in Evian.

Upon her arrival in Paris in 2005, she joined Génération précaire, an organization that denounced the conditions of interns through heavily mediatized actions.

In 2006, she co-founded Jeudi noir, an organization which aimed to shine light on the housing crisis through squats and mediatized festive actions.

In 2008, she joined l'Appel et la Pioche, an organization which aimed to denounce the excessive profits of the supermarket industry.

=== New Anticapitalist Party ===
She joined the New Anticapitalist Party upon its creation in 2009. That same year, she was elected to the party's executive committee. However, disappointed by the party's failure to work alongside other radical left wing parties, she left the party in February 2011.

=== Left Party ===
Upon joining the Left Party, she was appointed national secretary and became a member of the campaign committee for the 2012 presidential elections.

Leïla Chaibi ran for the 2012 parliamentary elections in Paris's 10th electoral district. In the 2014 mayoral elections, she led the Left Party's list in Paris's 14th arrondissement. Her campaign was heavily mediatized, notably for her food truck that served fries to passersby. She garnered 5.24% of the votes.

=== La France Insoumise ===
She joined La France Insoumise upon its creation in February 2016. She co-authored the party's agenda on housing and co-led its civil disobedience committee.

In parallel, Leïla Chaibi was among the initiators of Nuit Debout, a nationwide movement in 2016 that opposed the proposed labor reforms known as the El Khomri law. The movement has been likened to Occupy Wall Street and the Indignados movement. She was a candidate for La France Insoumise in the 2017 parliamentary elections in Paris's 10th electoral district. With 14.62% of the votes in the first round, she qualified for the runoff election, where she was defeated with 39.89% of the votes.

=== Member of the European Parliament ===
Leïla Chaibi was third on the list of La France Insoumise for the 2019 European elections led by Manon Aubry. With 6.31% of the votes, she was elected Member of the European Parliament alongside five other La France Insoumise candidates. Leïla Chaibi, like the rest of her delegation, joined the group The Left in the European Parliament. Following the departure of her colleague Manuel Bompard in 2022, she became the president of La France Insoumise's delegation in the European Parliament.

== Political positions ==
=== Platform workers ===
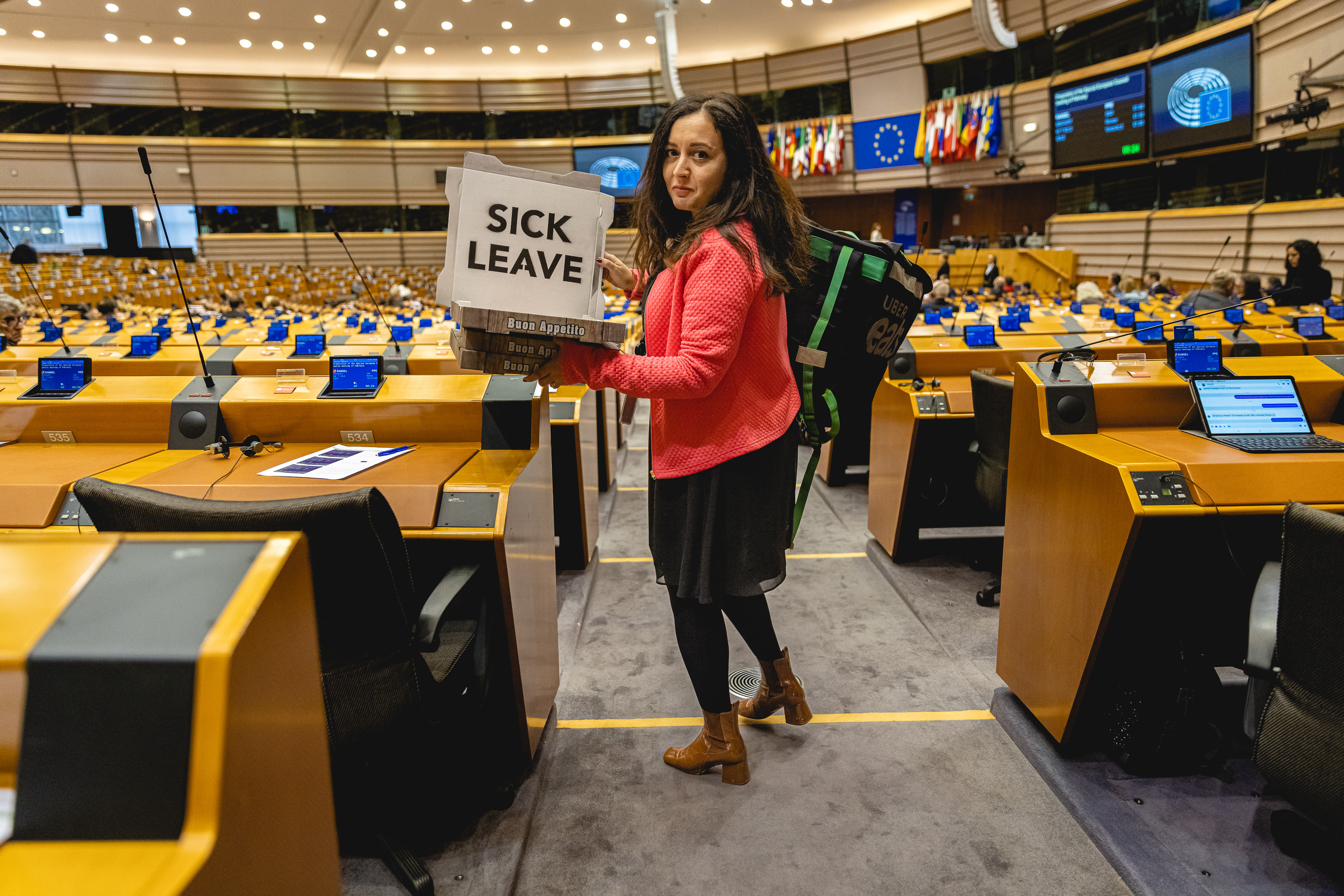
Leïla Chaibi in the Hemicycle of the European Parliament in Brussels in February 2023

As a Member of the European Parliament, she advocated for the rights of platform workers. She has been described as "the European Parliament's strongest voice on the issue."

In November 2020, she handed a proposal for a European directive on platform workers to the European Commissioner for Employment Nicolas Schmit.

She led the fight for the presumption of salaried employment alongside platform workers. In particular, she initiated the Transnational Forum of Alternatives to Uberization, which took place in 2019, 2021, 2022 and 2024. The event brought together in Brussels "platform workers from all over Europe and beyond to exchange viewpoints and define new strategies".

The directive was adopted by the Council of the European Union on March 11, 2024, despite France's opposition and Germany's abstention. Reacting to the directive's adoption, Leïla Chaibi welcomed the fact that "millions of bogus self-employed people across Europe are going to be reclassified as employees", while denouncing the fact that "the French president [Emmanuel Macron] tried to torpedo the presumption of salaried employment and serve Uber's interests rather than those of workers".

=== E-commerce ===
Leïla Chaibi has established herself as an opponent of Amazon's business model, citing its history of tax avoidance, its threat to small businesses, its monopolistic status and its treatment of workers. She embarked on an "Amazon Tour", touring France to visit sites where Amazon is building or planning to build warehouses. She denounced the treatment of workers, environmental pollution, and the traffic of "a thousand trucks a day" which "ruins" the lives of local residents.

Together with MEP María Eugenia Rodríguez Palop, she organized a Europe-wide hearing of Amazon workers. She is also the author of an open letter co-signed by thirty European elected representatives, calling on Amazon CEO Jeff Bezos to respond to allegations of spying on employees and politicians.

In January 2024, following Amazon's repeated refusal to testify before the European Parliament's Employment Committee, she called on the European Parliament to deny Amazon lobbyists access to the European Parliament. On February 27, the European Parliament revoked the access of Amazon lobbyists to the Parliament.

She is behind an independent study on the impact of e-commerce on employment, which concluded that "82,000 jobs have been lost in France in ten years due to online sales platforms ".

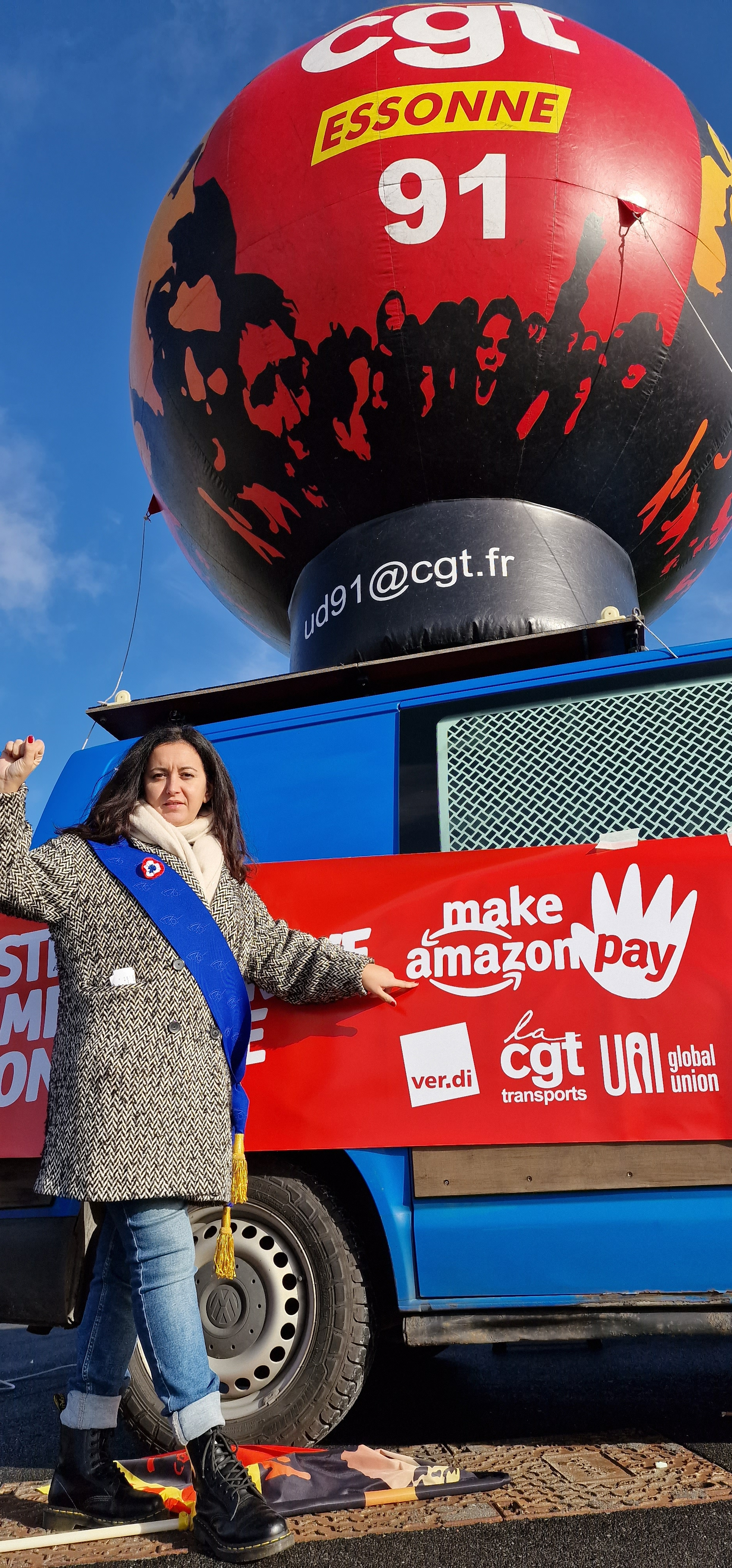
Leïla Chaibi at a protest in front of an Amazon warehouse in November 2022

Leïla Chaibi denounced President Emmanuel Macron's decision to award the Legion of Honor to Jeff Bezos, the CEO of Amazon. "A well-deserved award from the president of the rich", she remarked ironically.

=== Environmental issues ===
In May 2022, as the EU Council watered down the social measures in the climate package, Leïla Chaibi criticized the social climate fund as insufficient and warned of the risk of a resurgence of the Gilets jaunes across Europe. In April 2023, Leïla Chaibi opposed the extension of the carbon market proposed by the European Parliament, perceiving the threat of "an increase in petrol and heating prices".

In May 2023, in response to President Emmanuel Macron's call for a "pause" in European environmental regulation, Leïla Chaibi declared that left-wing forces must "stand together" to "protect people and nature".

In 2023, while the European Commission investigated allegations that Fret SNCF, France's rail freight company, benefited from illegal state subsidies, Transport Minister Clément Beaune presented a plan to liquidate Fret SNCF. Leïla Chaibi criticized the French government for its unwillingness to defend rail freight: "The European Commission says ‘Off with Fret SNCF's head!’, and rather than engaging in a face-off, the government is handing Fret SNCF's head on a silver platter."

Leïla Chaibi also spoke out against private jets, denouncing the fact that, 40% of the time, these airplanes do not carry any passengers.

=== Feminism ===
At the European Parliament, Leïla Chaibi, alongside several other female MEPs, denounced the harassment suffered by women on social networks, describing the insults she received on the Internet.

On 22 March 2023, she announced publicly that she was pregnant. She denounced the fact that, during her maternity leave, her constituents were not represented because she could not take part in votes or be replaced. She advocated for the Parliament to allow MEPs on parental leave to vote remotely or to transfer their vote to a colleague.

Leïla Chaibi is also in favor of the creation of a menstrual leave and advocated for an EU-wide abolition of VAT on menstrual protection products.

=== Foreign policy ===
In February 2024, the European Parliament adopted an amendment from the France insoumise delegation to the European Parliament demanding "an immediate and permanent ceasefire" in Gaza, in the context of the Gaza war. Leïla Chaibi hailed the adoption of the amendment, interpreting it as a sign that people "were increasingly siding with peace."

Leïla Chaibi is a substitute member of the Committee on Transport and Tourism and the Delegation to the EU-Mexico Joint Parliamentary Committee. She took part in the international "Toxitour" mission where MEPs visited Mexico between 2 and 11 December 2019, to assess the effects of the EU-Mexico free trade agreement. Leïla Chaibi denounced an "environmental, sanitary and social disaster", pledging to demand sanctions against companies that dump contaminated water in rivers.

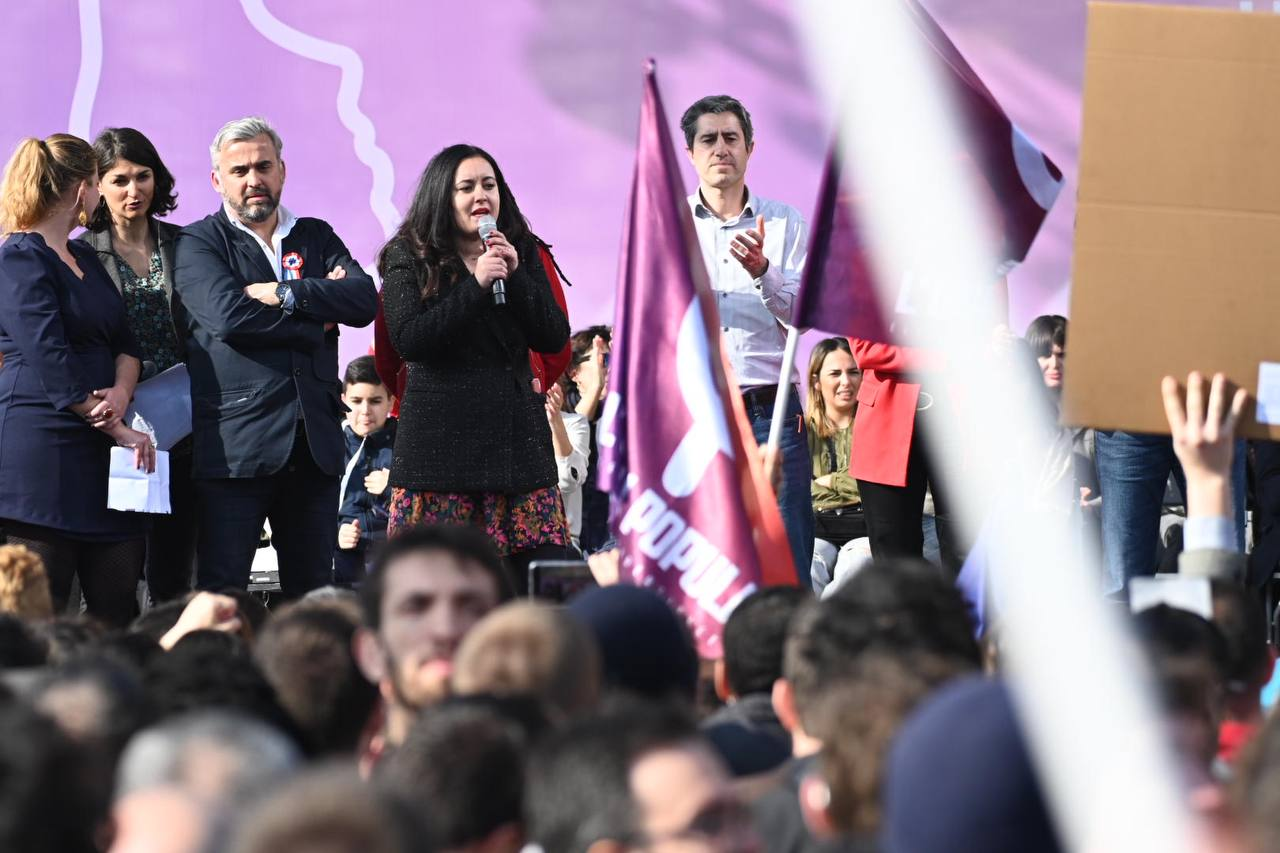
Leïla Chaibi at a march for a French Sixth Republic

In August 2022, she endorsed Chile's first draft of a new constitution, describing it as a "solid foundation for an egalitarian democracy that will inspire people across the world".

Leïla Chaibi is a board member of the Progressive International, alongside figures such as American author Noam Chomsky, former Ecuadorian president Rafael Correa and Canadian journalist Naomi Klein. The organization's aim is to "unite, organize, and mobilize progressive forces around the world.”

=== Qatargate and corruption in the European Parliament ===
In December 2022, the European Parliament was rocked by a vast scandal involving the corruption of its members by foreign powers such as Qatar. Leïla Chaibi called for an overhaul of the European Parliament's rules of conduct and greater transparency. In June 2023, these efforts led to the creation of a transparency register in which former MEPs engaged in lobbying activities must be registered.

== Communication ==
=== Social Media ===
Leïla Chaibi is the fourth MEP, regardless of nationality, and the second French MEP with the most likes on TikTok. She uses the platform to reveal behind-the-scenes of the European Parliament, such as MEPs's hairdressing salons and the Parliament's work cubicles. On TikTok, Leïla Chaibi also tackles political issues, denouncing, for example, the presence of lobbies in the European Parliament. According to Mouv, “finding a balance [between entertainment and informative content] is a way of encouraging young people to take an interest in politics”.

=== Députée Pirate ===
In January 2024, Leïla Chaibi published the book Députée pirate: comment j'ai infiltrée la machine européenne (Pirate MEP: How I infiltrated the European Machine). In this book, co-written with Cyril Pocréaux, she recounts her entry into the European Parliament and her fight for platform workers. “If you have lost all hope in the ability of politicians to change people's lives (...) you must read this book” declared Politis. Causette praised a “short but powerful account” in which “[we see Leïla Chaibi] elude the traps of the lobbies, convince the most austere commissioners and above all... fight against Emmanuel Macron's agenda”.

== Electoral history ==
=== European elections ===
Year	List	DistrictDistrict	Position on list	%	Rank	Seats obtained
2019	LFI	France	3rd	6,31	5th	6 / 79

=== Élections législatives ===
Year	Party	District	First round			Runoff election		
Year	Party	District	Votes	%	Rank	Votes	%	Outcome
2012	FG	Paris's 10th electoral district	4,524	11,62	3rd			
2017	LFI	Paris's 10th electoral district	5,447	14,62	2nd	12,063	39,89	Not elected

=== Mayoral elections ===
Year	Party	District	First round		
Year	Party	District	Voix	%	Rang
2014	PG	Paris's 14th arrondiseement	2489	5,24	6th
