= Claudia Pizarro =

Chilean politician

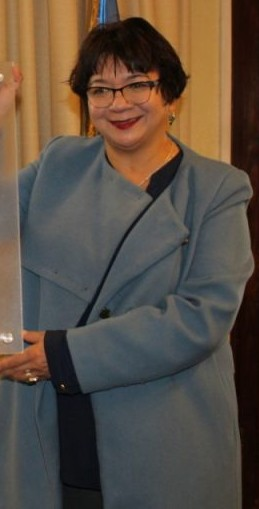

Mayor of La Pintana
- Incumbent
- Assumed office 6 December 2016
- Preceded by: Jaime Pavez Moreno

Councilwoman of La Pintana
- In office 6 December 2008 – 6 December 2016

Personal details
- Born: 26 October 1964 (age 61) Pedro Aguirre Cerda, Santiago, Chile
- Party: Christian Democratic Party (1980−present)
- Children: Two
- Parent(s): Gilberto Pizarro; Iris Peña
- Education: A-130 Technical Lyceum (BA)
- Occupation: Politician
- Profession: Public administrator

Claudia Gerlene Pizarro Peña (born 26 October 1964) is a Chilean politician and public administrator, militant from the Christian Democratic Party (DC).

Of humble origins, Pizarro has been mayor of La Pintana since 2016, a working-class neighborhood in Santiago attacked by drug trafficking problems. In that way, since 2018, Pizarro has gained renown in fighting crime through her appearances in the TV media.

== Early life ==
Her parents Gilberto Avelino Pizarro Bustamante, and Iris del Carmen Peña Riveros met in the shantytown of La Victoria, in Pedro Aguirre Cerda, where Claudia Pizarro was born. In 1969, the family moved to the March 9th Committee, a sector of La Pintana that today is called 'Pablo de Rokha' in honor of the same poet.

Pizarro studied her basic education at School 108 and later continued at A-130 Technical Lyceum of San Bernardo, where she obtained a degree of Public Administration. Once graduated, she began to work as a secretary.

== Political career ==
Pizarro began his political militancy aged 15.

On 6 December 2008, Pizarro was elected councilor of La Pintana.

In July 2016, she won a binding poll to present herself as a candidate for mayor of La Pintana for the centre-left coalition Nueva Mayoría (NM; «New Majority»). On 23 October, she won the municipal elections with 30.5% of the votes and took office on 6 December of that year.

On 18 May 2021, Pizarro was re-elected in the office of mayor of La Pintana.
