= Roberto Neira =

Mayor of Temuco, Chile

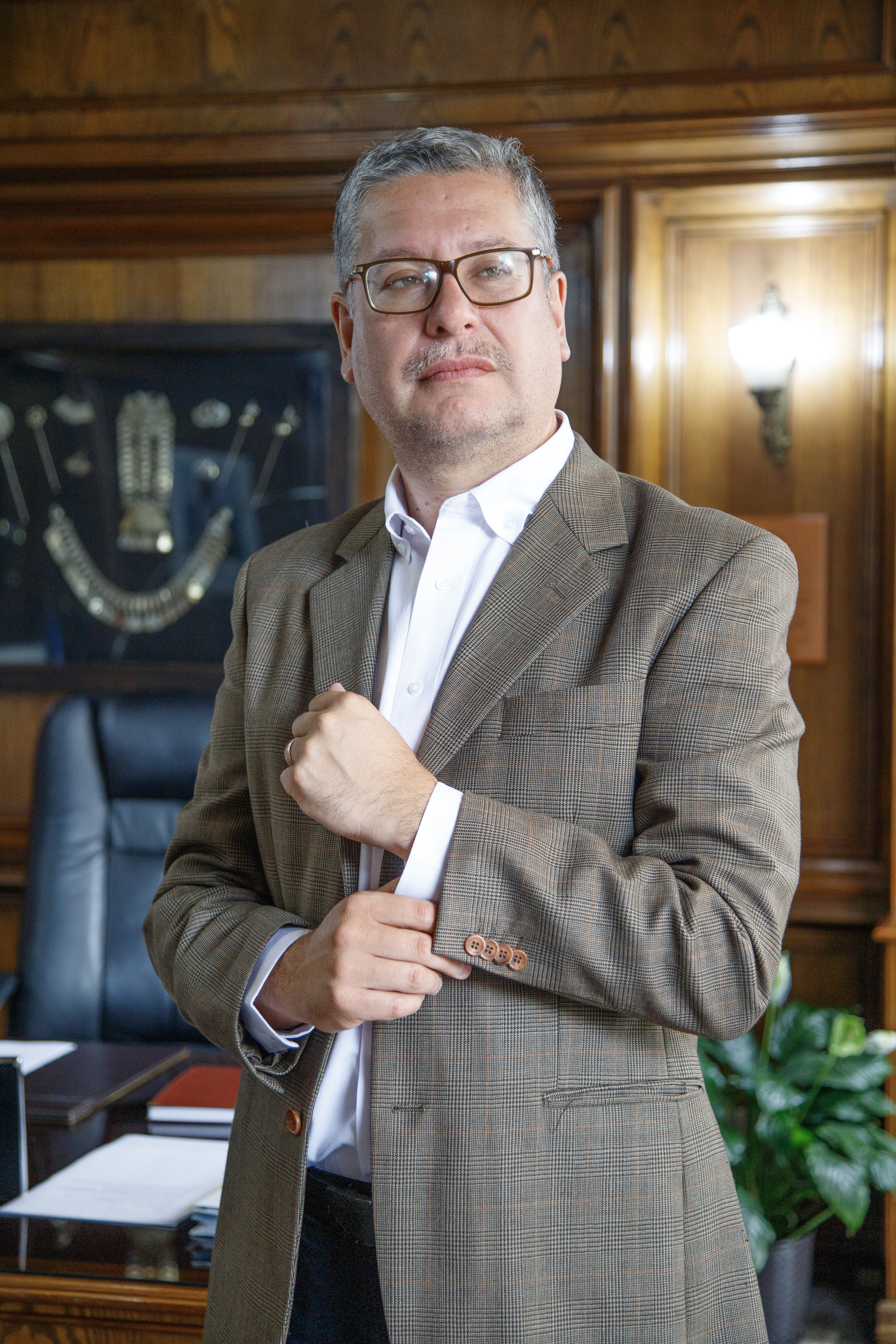

Mayor of Temuco
- Incumbent
- Assumed office 28 June 2021
- Preceded by: Jaime Salinas

Personal details
- Born: Roberto Francisco Neira Aburto; 13 May 1978 (age 48) Temuco, Chile
- Party: Independent
- Spouse: Romina Albornoz
- Children: 2
- Parent(s): Roberto Eugenio Neira Mackay, María Isabel Aburto Aguilera
- Education: Autonomous University of Chile, Mayor University
- Occupation: Politician
- Awards: Alcalde Solidario de Latinoamérica 2023 (INCLUSOCIAL)
- Website: https://robertoneira.cl

Roberto Francisco Neira Aburto (born 13 May 1978) is a Chilean politician, lawyer, firefighter and social worker, currently serving as mayor of the city of Temuco, Chile, since 28 June 2021. He has served also as Councilor of Temuco between 2012 and 2021.

== Biography ==
Roberto Neira was born in Temuco in 1978. He studied Social work at the Autonomous University of Chile and Law at the Mayor University. He has served as a professor of Constitutional, Indigenous and Political Law at the Santo Tomás University of Temuco.

=== Political career ===
In 2012, he was elected as Councilor of Temuco with 1467 votes. He was re-elected in 2016 to the same position with 2930 votes. In the year 2021, we was elected as mayor of Temuco after winning against 4 other candidates with 30,323 votes (36.22% of the Votes). In 2023, he was awarded the Alcalde Solidario de Latinoamérica 2023 (INCLUSOCIAL) award in Colombia. In 2024, he was re-elected as mayor of Temuco after the Municipal and Regional elections with 96,683 votes (52.93% of the votes).
