= Eugenia Garrido =

Chilean politician

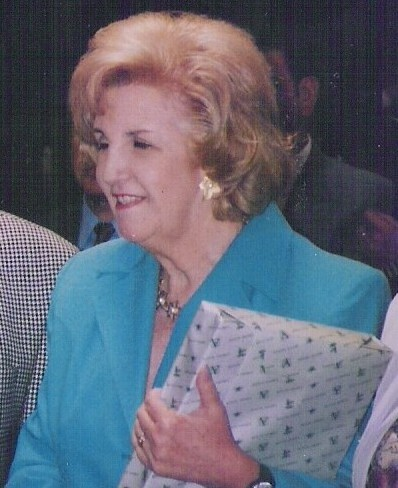

Councilwoman of Viña del Mar
- In office 6 December 2004 – 6 December 2016

Mayor of Viña del Mar
- In office 1 March 1982 – 11 March 1990
- Appointed by: Augusto Pinochet
- Preceded by: Edmundo Crespo Pisano
- Succeeded by: Juan Luis Trejo

Personal details
- Born: 14 May 1933 (age 93) Santiago, Chile
- Party: Independent Democratic Union
- Education: Pontifical Catholic University of Valparaíso (Lic.)
- Occupation: Politician
- Profession: Historian

Clemencia Eugenia Garrido Álvarez de la Rivera (born 14 May 1933) is a Chilean historian and politician who served as mayor Viña del Mar after being appointed by Augusto Pinochet's dictatorship.

== Works ==
=== Articles ===
- “Inauguración monumento José Francisco Vergara”, con Jorge Salomó, Archivo Histórico de Viña del Mar, serie Acontecer Urbano, N.º 1, Año 1, 1996, 15 págs.
- “Viña del Mar, un recorrido por su historia”, con Jorge Salomó, Archivo Histórico de Viña del Mar, serie Extensión Educativa, N.º 1, Año 2, Viña del Mar, 1997, 28 págs.
- “Palacio Rioja, Fernando Rioja Medel, creador y empresario 1860-1922”, Ediciones El Ángel, Viña del Mar, 1998, 38 págs.
- “140 años de la Cámara de Comercio y Valparaíso”, con Piero Castagneto y Alessandro Monteverde, Editorial Trineo S.A., Santiago, 1998, 175 págs.
- “Lever, Murphy y Cía., historia de una empresa viñamarina 1883-1936”, con Piero Castagneto, Flavio Baumann y Carolina Miranda, Viña del Mar, 1998, inédita.
- “Valparaíso Histórico de Lukas”, Con Vicente Mesina, Editorial El Mercurio de Valparaíso, Valparaíso, 2004.
