= List of killings by law enforcement officers in the United States, December 2021 =

This is a list of people reported killed by non-military law enforcement officers in the United States in December 2021, whether in the line of duty or not, and regardless of reason or method. The listing documents the occurrence of a death, making no implications regarding wrongdoing or justification on the part of the person killed or officer involved. Killings are arranged by date of the incident that caused death. Different death dates, if known, are noted in the description. The table below lists 102 people.

== December 2021 ==
Date	Name (age) of deceased	Race	Location	Description
2021-12-31	Dennis McHugh (44)	White	Beaumont, California	
2021-12-31	Unnamed man	Unknown	Meridian, Mississippi	Police shot and killed a man "covered in blood with a gun in each hand" and also killed a bystander.
2021-12-31	Unnamed woman	Unknown	Meridian, Mississippi	Police shot and killed a man "covered in blood with a gun in each hand" and also killed a bystander.
2021-12-29	Osman Sesay (27)	Black	Silver Spring, Maryland	
2021-12-29	Thelonious McNight (25)	Black	Paterson, New Jersey	
2021-12-28	Dwayne McDonald (62)	Black	Detroit, Michigan	
2021-12-27	Alex Clukey (15)	Unknown	Onslow County, North Carolina	A Jacksonville police officer called police to report accidentally shooting his teenage son in the head while playing with toy guns. The teenager was hospitalized until his death on January 4, 2022.
2021-12-27	Lyndon McLeod (47)	White	Lakewood, Colorado	McLeod (aka Roman McClay) committed several shootings in Denver and Lakewood, killing five civilians, before being killed by police during a shootout. McLeod targeted most of the people he shot. He had self-published a novel where the protagonist - named after himself - killed two of his eventual real-life victims.
2021-12-27	Kevin Dubois (31)	Unknown	Savannah, Georgia	
2021-12-27	Christopher Johnson (41)	Unknown	Houston, Texas	
2021-12-27	Sorin Ardelean (43)	White	Algona, Washington	
2021-12-27	Roberto Salgado Cazares (39)	Latino	Escondido, California	
2021-12-27	Christopher Thomas (22)	Unknown	Lake Charles, Louisiana	
2021-12-26	James Lowery (40)	Black	Titusville, Florida	Police chased Lowery following an assault. As Lowery climbed up a fence, an officer fired both his gun and taser, killing Lowery. Lowery was unarmed when he was shot. The officer was later charged with manslaughter.
2021-12-26	Vincent Black (31)	White	Buckeye, Arizona	
2021-12-26	Matthew Snyder (38)	Unknown	Simpsonville, South Carolina	
2021-12-26	Enrique Ruiz (33)	Latino	Los Angeles County, California	
2021-12-26	Charles Payne (75)	Black	Houston, Texas	
2021-12-24	Benny Hood (30)	Black	Atlanta, Georgia	
2021-12-24	Carson Dobson (24)	White	Dolgeville, New York	
2021-12-23	Daniel Elena Lopez (24)	Latino	Los Angeles, California	Police responded to reports of assault with a deadly weapon and a possible shooting at a Burlington store in North Hollywood. Police say that when officers arrived, a male suspect was in the process of assaulting a victim with a bike lock and they fired, fatally wounding him. A 14-year-old girl who was hiding with her mother in a nearby dressing room was struck by police gunfire and killed. Police say no gun was found on the assault suspect.
2021-12-23	Valentina Orellana-Peralta (14)	Latino	Los Angeles, California	Police responded to reports of assault with a deadly weapon and a possible shooting at a Burlington store in North Hollywood. Police say that when officers arrived, a male suspect was in the process of assaulting a victim with a bike lock and they fired, fatally wounding him. A 14-year-old girl who was hiding with her mother in a nearby dressing room was struck by police gunfire and killed. Police say no gun was found on the assault suspect.
2021-12-23	Steven Matze (44)	White	South Hill, Virginia	
2021-12-23	James Gross (58)	White	Akron, Ohio	
2021-12-23	Richard McCormick (62)	Unknown	Springfield, Missouri	
2021-12-23	Kokou Fiafonou (38)	Black	Austin, Minnesota	
2021-12-22	Mark Beilby (24)	White	Unadilla, New York	
2021-12-22	Brian Laxton (44)	White	Battle Creek, Michigan	
2021-12-22	James Culver (59)	White	Colorado Springs, Colorado	
2021-12-22	Jessie Gaither (48)	Black	Fordoche, Louisiana	
2021-12-22	Ronald Hoffman (57)	Unknown	Foster Township, Luzerne County, Pennsylvania	
2021-12-21	Brendan Pinkston (23)	White	Burton, Michigan	
2021-12-21	Chantel Myers (44)	White	Pitkin, Louisiana	
2021-12-21	Chawn Martin (45)	White	Savannah, Georgia	
2021-12-21	Robert Rushton (42)	Unknown	Brandon, Mississippi	
2021-12-20	Eudes PIerre (26)	Black	Brooklyn, New York	
2021-12-20	Alexander Wheeler (21)	White	New Lenox, Illinois	
2021-12-20	Marc "Barney" Barnhart (68)	White	Yorkville, Illinois	
2021-12-19	Nakita Williams (33)	Black	Detroit, Michigan	
2021-12-19	Eric Nelson (28)	Black	Bogalusa, Louisiana	
2021-12-18	David Herbert	White	Charlotte, North Carolina	
2021-12-18	Rosendo Olivio (34)	Latino	Los Angeles, California	
2021-12-18	Margarito Lopez (22)	Latino	Los Angeles	
2021-12-18	Joshua Gonzalez (20)	Latino	Vineland, New Jersey	
2021-12-17	Jeremy Yates (21)	Black	Culpeper, Virginia	
2021-12-17	Chatuma Crawford (20)	Black	Cicero, New York	Crawford was a pedestrian who was struck by an off-duty officer.
2021-12-16	John Taylor (18)	Black	Memphis, Tennessee	
2021-12-16	Terrance Dogan (27)	Black	Memphis, Tennessee	
2021-12-16	Unnamed man	Unknown	Flushing, Queens, New York	
2021-12-16	Anthony Phillips (39)	Unknown	Nashville, Tennessee	
2021-12-16	Christopher Alexander (32)	Unknown	Clinton, Utah	
2021-12-15	Kayla Lucas (25)	White	Memphis, Tennessee	
2021-12-15	Sergio Escalera-Valdez (45)	Unknown	North Richmond, California	
2021-12-15	Keith Hinrichsen (52)	White	North Platte, Nebraska	
2021-12-15	Brandon "BJ" Mauldin (32)	White	Liberty, South Carolina	
2021-12-15	Jahad Patterson (20)	Black	Elkhart, Indiana	
2021-12-14	William Gardner (21)	Black	Dayton, Ohio	
2021-12-14	Kevin Swinson (45)	White	Currie, North Carolina	
2021-12-13	Unnamed man	Unknown	Estancia, New Mexico	
2021-12-13	Harry Welter (84)	White	St. Michael, Minnesota	Welter, a former mayor of St. Michael, was fatally struck by a Wright County Sheriff's Department vehicle in a driveway.
2021-12-12	Jeremi Moore (35)	Black	Ferguson, Missouri	
2021-12-12	Amanuel Moreno (29)	Black	San Pablo, California	
2021-12-12	George Hollins (26)	Black	Jennings, Missouri	
2021-12-12	Patrick Horton (39)	Unknown	Cleveland, Ohio	
2021-12-12	Cristian Anguiano (32)	Latino	Corona, California	
2021-12-11	Robert Engle (64)	Unknown	Frankfort, Kentucky	
2021-12-11	Christopher Sterusky (28)	Black	Elizabethtown, Kentucky	
2021-12-10	Mark Peters (59)	White	Simms, Texas	
2021-12-10	Guadalupe, Zavala (55)	Latino	Antioch, California	
2021-12-10	Christopher Raborn (40)	White	Waverly, Georgia	
2021-12-10	Xavier Miller	Unknown	Colorado Springs, Colorado	
2021-12-10	David Talbert (55)	Unknown	Crossville, Tennessee	
2021-12-10	John "Amoo" Za Moua (28)	Native Hawaiian and Pacific Islander	Pine River, Wisconsin	
2021-12-10	Michael Dingman (43)	Unknown	Spokane, Washington	
2021-12-10	Terence Caffey (30)	Black	Little Rock, Arkansas	
2021-12-09	Arnett Carr (64)	Unknown	Ellenwood, Georgia	
2021-12-08	Michael Pantoja (45)	Latino	Colorado Springs, Colorado	
2021-12-08	Angelo Weitz (42)	Unknown	Stockton, California	
2021-12-08	Ronta Stewart (18)	Black	Columbus, Ohio	
2021-12-08	Jared Risius (35)	White	Iowa Falls, Iowa	
2021-12-08	Unnamed woman (42)	Unknown	Hermitage, Missouri	
2021-12-08	Andris Wofford (29)	Black	Chicago, Illinois	
2021-12-07	Gary McCormick	Black	Elizabethtown, Kentucky	
2021-12-07	Ronald Ehrich (88)	White	Riverview, Florida	A deputy responded to Ehrich's home after a neighbor reported not seeing him for two days. According to police, the deputy shot and killed Ehrich after he walked towards her with a firearm. Ehrich was a veteran of the Tampa Police Department.
2021-12-07	Mario Diaz (41)	Latino	Albuquerque, New Mexico	
2021-12-07	Mitchell Davis (29)	White	Fort Worth, Texas	
2021-12-06	Douglas Halphin	White	Blue Springs, Missouri	
2021-12-06	Brandon Keck (30)	White	Portland, Oregon	
2021-12-06	Dale Query (38)	White	Basin, Wyoming	
2021-12-05	Quadry Sanders (29)	Black	Lawton, Oklahoma	Police responded to reports of a man with a gun. Two officers shot Sanders 15 times. Sanders was unarmed and was holding a ball cap. The two officers were later fired and charged with manslaughter.
2021-12-05	Unnamed person	Unknown	Westminster, Colorado	
2021-12-05	Michael Guillory	Unknown	Las Vegas, Nevada	
2021-12-05	Miguel Perez Gonzalez (38)	Latino	Morrow, Georgia	
2021-12-04	Michael Wayne Jackson (62)	Black	Houston, Texas	A Houston Police officer was responding to a call from another officer to assist in apprehending a group of suspected carjackers. When his vehicle neared an intersection, the officer turned to avoid hitting other cars and jumped the sidewalk, striking Jackson, who died.
2021-12-03	Michael Graves (39)	Unknown	St. Louis, Missouri	
2021-12-03	Alhaji M. Sow (18)	Black	Melbourne, Florida	Sow had reportedly assaulted multiple fellow Florida Institute of Technology students with a knife, and injured a law enforcement officer before being fatally shot by officers.
2021-12-02	Arlin Bordeaux (29)	Native American	Rosebud County, Montana	A man was killed in a shooting involving a Bureau of Indian Affairs officer. Few details were released. The FBI is investigating.
2021-12-02	Brian Howard (25)	White	Buffalo Grove, Illinois	
2021-12-02	Anei Joker (20)	Black	Taylorsville, Utah	
2021-12-02	Unnamed man	Unknown	McDowell, Kentucky	
2021-12-01	Edward Gatling (38)	Black	Redan, Georgia	
2021-12-01	Billy Bizzell (52)	Black	Yellow Bluff, Alabama	

== See also ==
- Death in custody § United States
- Henry A. Wallace Police Crime Public Database
- List of cases of police brutality
- List of countries with annual rates and counts for killings by law enforcement officers
- List of law enforcement officers killed in the line of duty in the United States
- List of law enforcement officers convicted for an on-duty killing in the United States
- List of police reforms related to the George Floyd protests
- List of unarmed African Americans killed by law enforcement officers in the United States
- Lists of killings by law enforcement officers
- Police brutality in the United States
- Police misconduct § United States
- Police riot § United States
- Police use of deadly force in the United States
