= Miss Universe Chile 2023 =

- Date: 13 August 2023
- Presenters: María Fernanda Aristizábal
- Venue: Radisson Blu Hotel, Santiago, Chile
- Entrants: 18
- Placements: 11
- Winner: Celeste Viel; Foreign Community

Miss Universe Chile 2023 was the 15th edition of the Miss Universe Chile pageant, it was held at the Radisson Blu Hotel in Santiago, Chile, on August 13, 2023.

Sofia Depassier of Foreign Community crowned Celeste Viel of Foreign Community as her successor at the end of the event. This marked Foreign Community's second-overall victory and first back-to-back in the pageant.

Viel's mother, Paula Caballero, won the title of Miss World Chile 1992, and she represented her country at Miss World 1992. Viel represented Chile at the Miss Universe 2023 pageant and finished as a Top 20 semifinalist, placing for the first time since 2004.

== Results ==
=== Placements ===
| Placement | Contestant |
|---|---|
| Miss Universe Chile 2023 | Foreign Community – Celeste Viel |
| 1st Runner-Up | Puerto Varas – Kristina Lie |
| 2nd Runner-Up | Santiago – Magdalena Landshut |
| 3rd Runner-Up | Rancagua – Amaya Butrón ∆ |
| 4th Runner-Up | Antofagasta – Carla Sánchez |
| Top 11 | Chicureo – Camila Santander; Chiloé – Natia Tirachini; Colina – Gabriela Vásquez; La Reina – Karol Eberl ∆; Providencia – Anais Godoy; San Bernardo – Magdalena Cid |

∆ – Voted into the Top 11 by viewers

=== Special awards ===
- This award was given by the community of missologists during the concentration of Miss Universe Chile 2023:

| Award | Contestant |
|---|---|
| Miss Smile | Foreign Community – Celeste Viel |
| Finalists | Antofagasta – Carla Sánchez; Chicureo – Camila Santander; Colina – Gabriela Vásquez; Santiago – Magdalena Landshut |

- This award was presented by Juan Manuel Pérez, official dentist of Miss Universe Chile 2023 in an event prior to the pageant:

| Award | Contestant |
|---|---|
| Miss Top Model | San Bernardo –;Magdalena Cid |
| Finalistas | Colina – Gabriela Vásquez; Foreign Community – Celeste Viel |

- The Miss Universe Chile organization awarded 6 special bands to those who stood out in different categories during the final night of the pageant:

| Award | Contestant |
|---|---|
| Miss Runaway | Foreign Community – Celeste Viel |
| Finalists | Providencia – Anais Godoy; Rancagua – Amaya Butrón |

| Award | Contestant |
|---|---|
| Miss Artisan PRO | Puerto Varas – Kristina Lie |
| Finalists | Chicureo – Camila Santander; Huechuraba – Catalina Pradenas |

| Award | Contestant |
|---|---|
| Miss Conair | Puerto Varas – Kristina Lie |
| Finalists | Alto Hospicio – Valeria González; Chiloé – Natia Tirachini |

| Award | Contestant |
|---|---|
| Miss Impact Away | Viña del Mar – Martina Gaete |
| Finalists | Chiloé – Natia Tirachini; Iquique – Arantza Bori |

| Award | Contestant |
|---|---|
| Miss Elegancia | Ovalle – Carla Ossandon |
| Finalistas | Antofagasta – Carla Sánchez; Foreign Community – Celeste Viel |

| Award | Contestant |
|---|---|
| Miss Elegance | Ovalle – Carla Ossandon |
| Finalistas | Antofagasta – Carla Sánchez; Comunidad Extranjera – Celeste Viel |

- This award was awarded via a vote on the official Miss Universe Chile app and automatically entered the finalists table:

| Award | Contestant |
|---|---|
| Miss Choicely Chile | La Reina – Karol Eberl; Rancagua – Amaya Butrón |

== Juries ==
- Juan Manuel Pérez: Official dentist of Miss Universo Chile 2023.
- Álvaro Carreño: CEO of Dermovien Clinic.
- Leah Ashmore: Miss Universe Paraguay 2022.
- Mario Irazzoky: Mister Chile 2019.
- Catherine Dauvin: Chilean Lady 2022.
- Sofia Depassier: Miss Universe Chile 2022.
- Natalie Ackermann: National Director of Miss Universe Colombia and Miss Universe Germany.
- Kaius Meskanen: CEO of the Choicely App.
- Stephany Carrera: Social Media Manager.

== Contestants ==
Eighteen contestants competed for the title.

| Contestant | Age | Represented |
|---|---|---|
| Amaya Butrón | 20 | Rancagua |
| Anais Godoy Mussons | 19 | Providencia |
| Arantza Natalia Bori Heyne | 21 | Iquique |
| Camila Santander | 25 | Huechuraba |
| Carla Ossandon | 27 | Ovalle |
| Carla Sánchez | 24 | Antofagasta |
| Catalina Pradenas | 21 | Chicureo |
| Celeste Viel Caballero | 23 | Foreign Community |
| Francisca Sembler Cubillos | 26 | Las Condes |
| Gabriela Vásquez Davila | 24 | Colina |
| Indira Bravo Amaya | 22 | Arica |
| Karol Eberl | 21 | La Reina |
| Kristina Lie | 26 | Puerto Varas |
| Magdalena Cid | 19 | San Bernardo |
| Magdalena Landshut | 19 | Santiago |
| Martina Gaete | 18 | Viña del Mar |
| Natia Juliette Tirachini Lincoleo | 26 | Chiloé |
| Valeria Fernanda González | 22 | Alto Hospicio |

=== Withdrawals ===
- Constanza Núñez represented Peñaflor, but before the contest she renounced the title.
- Macarena Quinteros Tapia represented Patagonia, but before the contest she renounced the title.

== Data about the delegates ==
- Some delegates were born or live in a country other than the one they represent, or have a different ethnic origin:
  - Indira Bravo (Arica) is half Bolivian.
  - Celeste Viel (Foreign Community) was born and raised in the United States.
- Other significant data from some delegates:
  - Celeste Viel (Foreign Community) is the daughter of the actor and presenter Felipe Viel.
  - Kristina Lie (Puerto Varas) is the first candidate to participate as a mother.
