= Miss Universe Chile 2024 =

16th Miss Universe Chile pageant

- Date: 7 July 2024
- Presenters: Jorge Aldoney
- Venue: Teatro Ceina, Santiago, Chile
- Entrants: 23
- Placements: 12
- Debuts: Los Angeles; Los Dominicos; Temuco
- Withdrawals: Alto Hospicio; Arica; Apoquindo; Chicureo; Chiloé; Colina; El Golf; Foreign Community; Huechuraba; Iquique; Ovalle; Puerto Montt; Puerto Varas; Pirque; San Bernardo; Santiago; Valparaíso
- Returns: Arauco; Cajon del Maipo; Concón; La Dehesa; Ñuñoa; Pedro Aguirre Cerda; Peñalolén; San Carlos de Apoquindo; San Felipe; Zapallar
- Winner: Emilia Dides; Vitacura

Miss Universe Chile 2024 was the 16th edition of the Miss Universe Chile pageant, it was held at the Teatro Ceina in Santiago, Chile, on 7 July 2024.

Celeste Viel of Foreign Community crowned Emilia Dides of Vitacura as her successor at the end of the event. This marked Vitacura's first victory in the pageant. Dides represented Chile at the Miss Universe 2024 pageant in Mexico, where she reached the top 12.

The pageant was broadcast online through the YouTube channel of Miss Universe Chile and was broadcast on the television channel La Red. The contest was presented by Mister Chile 2024 Jorge Aldoney.

== Results ==
=== Placements ===
Placement	Contestant
Miss Universe Chile 2024	Vitacura – Emilia Dides
1st Runner-Up	Los Angeles – Francisca Lavandero
2nd Runner-Up	San Felipe – Ariel Cordero
3rd Runner-Up	La Dehesa – Javiera Israel
4th Runner-Up	Los Dominicos – Ignacia Fernández
5th Runner-Up	Las Condes – Beatriz Vásquez
6th Runner-Up	Cajon del Maipo – Camila Allan
Top 12	La Serena – Montserrat Velasco §; Pedro Aguirre Cerda – Catalina Harasic; Peñalolén – María José Sáez; San Carlos de Apoquindo – Alexandra Briones; Temuco – Catalina Wu

§ – Voted into the Top 12 by viewers

=== Special awards ===
Award	Winner
Best in Evening Gown	Cajon del Maipo – Camila Allan
Miss Catwalk	Vitacura – Emilia Dides
Miss Face	Los Dominicos – Ignacia Fernández
Miss Congeniality	Concón – Catalina Bunster
Miss Influencer	San Felipe – Ariel Cordero
Miss Photogenic	Temuco – Catalina Wu
Miss Elegant	Providencia – Jael Plon

== Pageant ==
=== Selection committee ===
The panel of judges for the pageant consisted of:

- Brian Frick – plastic surgeon
- Armando Cova – marketing chief at Aurus Jewelry
- Barbara Subiabre – Dama Chilena 2023
- Alvaro Rubio – plastic surgeon
- Adonis Yerone – actor
- Elena Mateo – Reina Hispanoamericana Argentina 2024
- César Anel Rodríguez – president of Señorita Panamá
- Veronica Lazo – marketing manager at Yogen Fruz
- Alvaro Carreño – plastic surgeon

=== Broadcast ===
The pageant was broadcast online through the YouTube channel of Miss Universe Chile and was broadcast on La Red.

== Contestants ==
Twenty-three contestants competed for the title.

Locality	Contestant
Arauco	Anne Saelzer
Cajon del Maipo	Camila Allan
Concepcion	Florencia Calderón
Concón	Catalina Bunster
La Dehesa	Javiera Israel
La Florida	Celeste Ossandón
La Reina	Camila Leighton
La Serena	Montserrat Velasco
Las Condes	Beatriz Vásquez
Lo Barnechea	Sofia Latorre
Los Angeles	Francisca Lavandero
Los Dominicos	Ignacia Fernández
Machalí	Albany Escofet
Nuñoa	Gabriela Ibáñez
Pedro Aguirre Cerda	Catalina Harasic
Peñalolén	María José Sáez
Providencia	Jael Plon
Rancagua	Fernanda Zúñiga
San Carlos de Apoquindo	Alexandra Briones
San Felipe	Ariel Cordero
Temuco	Catalina Wu
Viña del Mar	Vicky Yucue
Vitacura	Emilia Dides
Zapallar	Ignacia Cifuentes
