= Miss Earth Chile 2015 =

- Date: October 3, 2015
- Presenters: Camila Stuardo
- Entertainment: Javiera Mena
- Venue: Puerto Marina Hall, Concepción
- Broadcaster: Bío Bío TV
- Entrants: 17
- Placements: 8
- Winner: Natividad Leiva; Providencia

Nuestra Belleza Chile 2015, the 3rd Miss Earth Chile Pageant, was held on October 3, 2015, at Puerto Marina Hall. Catalina Cáceres of Santiago crowned her successor Natividad Leiva of Providencia at the end of the event. She represented Chile at Miss Earth 2015 pageant and placed Top 8.

== Results ==
=== Placements ===
Placement	Candidate
Miss Earth Chile 2015	Providencia – Natividad Leiva
Miss Air Chile	La Serena – Trinidad Rendic
Miss Fire Chile	La Calera – Cathia Orellana
Miss Water Chile	Concepción – Bárbara Zúñiga
Top 8	Nancagua – Valentina Cornejo; Viña del Mar – Nicole Pinto; La Ligua – María Pía Vilches; Temuco – Fharydez Ulloa

== Special awards ==
Special Award	Candidate
Best Face	Punta Arenas - Javiera Meza
Miss Photogenic	Providencia - Natividad Leiva
Miss Congeniality	Trovolhue - Lilet Atay
Top Model	La Calera - Cathia Orellana
Miss Popularity	Calama - Victoria Robledo
Best Body	La Serena - Trinidad Rendic
Best in Evening Gown	La Ligua - María Pía Vilches
Best Regional Director	Puerto Montt - Camila Astroza

== Contestants ==
Commune	Contestant	Age	Height
Calama	Victoria Robledo	23	1.67 m (5 ft 6 in)
La Serena	Trinidad Rendic	20	1.76 m (5 ft 9 in)
La Ligua	María Pía Vilches	20	1.77 m (5 ft 10 in)
La Calera	Cathia Orellana	18	1.70 m (5 ft 7 in)
Viña del Mar	Nicole Pinto	24	1.67 m (5 ft 6 in)
Valparaíso	Daniela Ramírez	19	1.76 m (5 ft 9 in)
Santiago Centro	Carmina Grossi	21	1.68 m (5 ft 6 in)
Providencia	Natividad Leiva	22	1.80 m (5 ft 11 in)
Nancagua	Valentina Cornejo	19	1.68 m (5 ft 6 in)
Chillán	Bárbara Bravo	22	1.65 m (5 ft 5 in)
Concepción	Bárbara Zúñiga	20	1.78 m (5 ft 10 in)
Talcahuano	Claudia Arteaga	26	1.70 m (5 ft 7 in)
Trovolhue	Lilet Atay	26	1.76 m (5 ft 9 in)
Temuco	Fharydez Ulloa	18	1.77 m (5 ft 10 in)
Valdivia	Katherine Saavedra	23	1.68 m (5 ft 6 in)
Puerto Montt	Camila Astroza	24	1.68 m (5 ft 6 in)
Punta Arenas	Javiera Meza	19	1.70 m (5 ft 7 in)

== Pageant Notes ==
- This is the first time when regional and communal candidates are participating.
- This is the first time when the pageant is held outside Santiago, being it in Concepción.
- Miss Earth Chile 2015 winner, Natividad Leiva, previously competed in Miss Universo Chile 2014 where she finished as the 1st Runner-up.
- Carmina Grossi Alegría, Miss Earth Santiago Centro is the niece of actress Sigrid Alegría
