= Miss Grand Chile =

National beauty pageant in Chile

- Established: 22 September 2017; 9 years ago
- Founder: Boris Cabrera
- Type: Beauty pageant
- Headquarters: Santiago de Chile
- Location: Chile
- Members: Miss Grand International
- Official language: Spanish
- President: Marión De Giorgis (2025)

Miss Grand Chile is a national female beauty pageant in Chile founded in 2017 by Boris Cabrera of Latin Scouting y CBC Producciones to select the country's representative for Miss Grand International. The pageant license was transferred to Keno Manzur in 2019 and subsequently to Cristian Chanaca and Gabriel Alfonsino in 2021.

Since Chile's debut at Miss Grand International in 2014, the country's highest placement has been a Top 20 finish, achieved by Francisca Lavandero in 2019.

== History ==
Chile made its debut at Miss Grand International in 2014 in Bangkok, represented by 21-year-old model Karla Bovet Quidel, before being absent for the following two editions.

In 2017, Latin Scouting y CBC Producciones, headed by Boris Cabrera and organizer of Reinas de Chile, acquired the national franchise and subsequently launched the inaugural Miss Grand Chile pageant at the Music Palace Event Center in Talca on 22 September. The contest featured nine finalists representing Chillán, Chillán Viejo, Concepción, La Florida, Pucón, Puerto Montt, Quillota, Talca, and Valdivia. Nicole Ebner of La Florida won the title and represented Chile at Miss Grand International 2017 in Vietnam, where she was unplaced. The pageant also awarded the Miss Supranational Chile 2017 title to Konstanza Schmidt of Quillota. As the pageant was not held in 2018, the licensee appointed María Flores, one of the 2017 finalists from Concepción, to represent Chile at the international competition in Myanmar.

The pageant was not held in 2020 due to the COVID-19 pandemic. As a result, the organizer appointed a delegate to represent Chile at the Miss Grand International 2020 pageant in Thailand instead. In 2021, Manzur relinquished the franchise to Cristian Chanaca and Gabriel Alfonsino, who have organized the pageant annually since then.

== Editions ==
=== Location and date ===
Edition	Date	Final venue	Entrants	Ref.
1st	22 September 2017	Centro de Eventos Music Palace, Talca	9	
2nd	24 May 2019	Teatro Parque Cousiño, Santiago	32	
3rd	25 September 2021	Criss Chacana Model Agency, Iquique	8	
4th	29 May 2022	Criss Chacana Model Agency, Iquique	9	
5th	18 June 2023	Teatro ICTUS, Santiago de Chile	6	
6th	29 August 2026	Gran Espacio Parque, La Florida	26	

=== Competition result ===
Edition	Winner	Runners-up				Ref.
Edition	Winner	First	Second	Third	Fourth	Ref.
1st	Nicole Ebner (Santiago Metro)	Muriel Berner (Los Lagos)	Sol Vargas Sepulveda (Ñuble)	Konstanza Schmidt (Valparaíso)	Not awarded	
2nd	Francisca Ceballos (Biobío)	Ignacia Albornoz (Valparaíso)	Vania Pamela Pool (Antofagasta)	Aylin Jaldin (Tarapacá)	Antonia Haeger (La Reina)	
3rd	Vanessa Echeverría (Antofagasta)	Adriana Machado (Tarapacá)	Katia Andrea (Antofagasta)	Josefa Bastias (O'Higgins)	Not awarded	
4th	Karina Pérez Gres (Santiago Metro)	Krishna Sandoval (Valparaíso)	Tamara Reusch (Magallanes)	Not awarded		
5th	Paula Henríquez (Santiago Metro)	Camila Joscelyn (Santiago Metro)	Francisca Ramírez (La Reina)	Not awarded		
6th	Ignacia Michelson (Santiago Metro)	Leandra Sáenz (Valparaíso)	Paula Jiménez (Santiago Metro)	Not awarded		

== Winner gallery ==
Miss Grand Chile 2026
Ignacia Michelson

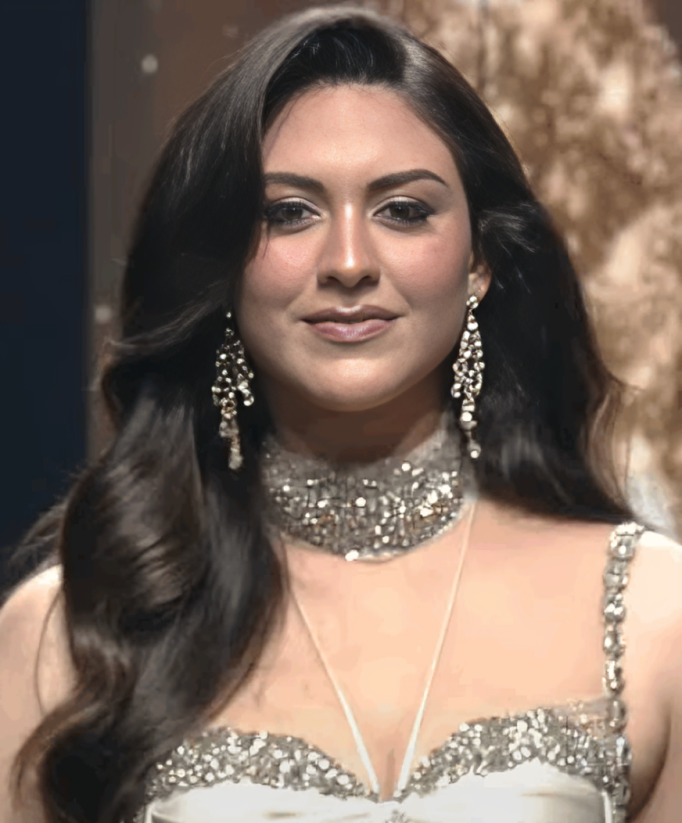
Miss Grand Chile 2024
Gabriella Álvez

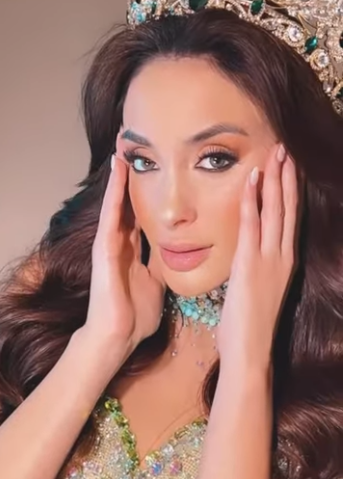
Miss Grand Chile 2023
Paula Henríquez

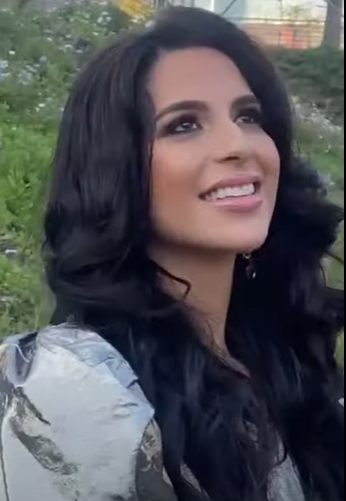
Miss Grand Chile 2022
Karina Perez Gres

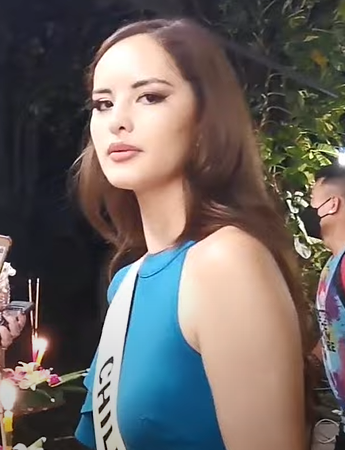
Miss Grand Chile 2021
Vanessa Echeverría

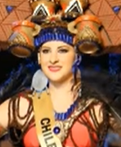
Miss Grand Chile 2014
Karla Bovet Quidel

== International competition ==
The following is a list of Chile representatives who competed at the Miss Grand International pageant.

Color keys

- : Declared as the winner
- : Ended as a runner-up (Top 5)
- : Ended as a finalist (Top 10)
- : Ended as a semifinalist (Top 20/21/22)
- : Ended as special awards winner

Year	Region	Representative	Title	Placement	Special Awards	National Director
2026	Santiago Metropolitan	Ignacia Michelson	Miss Grand Chile 2026	Top 25		Marión De Giorgis
2025	Santiago Metropolitan	Emilia Dides	Appointment	Withdrew		Marión De Giorgis
2024	Araucanía	Gabriella Alvez	Appointment	Unplaced		Gabriel Alfonsino
2023	Santiago Metropolitan	Paula Antonia Henríquez	Miss Grand Chile 2023	Unplaced		Gabriel Alfonsino
2022	Santiago Metropolitan	Karina Pérez Gres	Miss Grand Chile 2022	Unplaced		Cristian Chanaca & Gabriel Alfonsino
2021	Antofagasta	Vanessa Echeverría	Miss Grand Chile 2021	Unplaced		Cristian Chanaca & Gabriel Alfonsino
2020	Valparaíso	Paula Valentina Benavente	Appointment	Unplaced		Keno Manzur
2019	Biobío	Francisca Ceballos	Miss Grand Chile 2019	Top 20		Keno Manzur
2018	Santiago Metropolitan	María Flores	Miss Grand Chile 2017 Finalist	Unplaced		Boris Cabrera
2017	Santiago Metropolitan	Nicole Ebner	Miss Grand Chile 2017	Unplaced		Boris Cabrera
Did not compete between 2015-2016
2014	Araucanía	Karla Bovet Quidel	Appointment	Unplaced		Karla Bovet Quidel
