= Miss Universe Chile 2025 =

17th Miss Universe Chile pageant

- Date: 1 August 2025
- Presenters: Martín Cárcamo
- Entertainment: Los Tetas; Emilia Dides; Jean Paul Olhaberry; Nico Ruiz
- Broadcaster: Canal 13
- Entrants: 25
- Placements: 20
- Withdrawals: Arauco; Cajon del Maipo; Concón; La Dehesa; Los Angeles; Los Dominicos; Ñuñoa; Pedro Aguirre Cerda; Peñalolén; San Carlos de Apoquindo; San Felipe; Zapallar
- Returns: Arica; Chiloé; Colina; Maintencillo; Maipú; Huechuraba; Osorno; Paine; Perquenco; Pucon; Santiago; Valparaíso
- Winner: Inna Moll; Vitacura

Miss Universe Chile 2025 was the 17th edition of the Miss Universe Chile pageant, held in Santiago, on 1 August 2025.

At the end of the event, Emilia Dides of Vitacura crowned Inna Moll of Vitacura as her successor. This marked Vitacura's second victory in the pageant and first back-to-back in the pageant. Moll represented Chile at the Miss Universe 2025 pageant in Thailand, where she reached the top 12.

The contest was broadcast on television network Canal 13, and was presented by Chilean actor and host Martín Cárcamo.

== Background ==
=== Location and date ===
The organization scheduled the finals for 1 August.

=== Selection of participants ===
Contestants from twenty-five locations were selected to compete for the title through casting calls or by winning a local competition.

== Results ==
=== Placements ===
| Placement | Contestant |
|---|---|
| Miss Universe Chile 2025 | Vitacura – Inna Moll ‡ |
| 1st Runner-Up | Huechuraba – Martina Kriskovich |
| 2nd Runner-Up | Las Condes – María Jesús Honorato |
| 3rd Runner-Up | Lo Barnechea – Scarlett Hermosilla |
| 4th Runner-Up | Providencia – Paula Jiménez |
| Top 10 | Concepcion – Andrea del Solar; La Florida – Catalina Samaniego § ∆; Maipú – Ariel Cordero; Santiago – Antonia Casanova; Temuco – Sofia Bozzo |
| Top 20 | Antofagasta – Carolina Salinas; Chillan – Beatriz Sandoval; La Reina – Kriss Mariel; Machalí – Josefina Orrego; Maitencillo – Catalina Palacios; Perquenco – Arlette Álvarez; Pucón – Nicol Cavieres; Talca – Nallely Bobadilla; Valparaiso – Fernanda Mena; Viña del Mar – Florencia Rivera |

^§ Automatically qualified as a semifinalist after winning the "Miss Popularity"

^∆ Automatically qualified as a top 10 finalists after winning the "Popular Vote"

^∆ Automatically qualified as a top 5 finalists after winning the "Popular Vote"

=== Special awards ===
| Award | Winner |
|---|---|
| Miss Congeniality | Colina – Josefa Rodríguez |
| Miss Popularity | La Florida – Catalina Samaniego |

== Pageant ==
=== Format ===
The results of the preliminary competition, held on 5 July 2025, determined the first 20 semifinalists. The event evaluated the 25 delegates in the swimsuit and evening gown segments, along with closed-door interviews.

=== Selection committee ===
The panel of judges for the pageant consisted of:

- Angélica Castro – Actress
- Ignacio Gutiérrez – Journalist and television presenter.
- Viviana Nunes – Model television presenter
- Savka Pollak – Miss Chile 1993
- Jorge Aldoney – Mister World Chile 2024
- Ellans De Santis – Model
- Carla Ochoa – Miss Universe Chile 1998's 3rd-runner up (only as preliminary judge)
- Claudia Arnello – Miss Universe Chile 2003 (only as preliminary judge)
- Nataly Chilet – Miss Earth Chile 2005 and Miss World Chile 2008 (only as preliminary judge)
- Camila Andrade – Miss World Chile 2013 (only as preliminary judge)
- Paola Camaggi – Miss Chile 1991's first runner up and Miss America (only as preliminary judge)

=== Broadcast ===
The pageant was live-streamed on television network Canal 13.

== Contestants ==
Twenty-five contestants are confirmed to compete.

| Locality | Contestant | Age (Note: Ages at the time of the competition) |
|---|---|---|
| Antofagasta | Carolina Salinas | 31 |
| Arica | Isidora Ripoll | 19 |
| Chillán | Beatriz Sandoval | 35 |
| Colina | Josefa Rodríguez | 27 |
| Concepcion | Andrea del Solar | 30 |
| Huechuraba | Martina Kriskovich | 19 |
| La Florida | Catalina Samaniego | 25 |
| La Reina | Kriss Mariel | 27 |
| Las Condes | María Jesús Honorato | 28 |
| Lo Barnechea | Scarlette Hermosilla | 32 |
| Machalí | Josefina Orrego | 22 |
| Maipu | Ariel Cordero | 30 |
| Maitencillo | Catalina Palacios | 45 |
| Osorno | Martina Laube | 20 |
| Paine | Agustina Carrasco | 19 |
| Perquenco | Arlett Álvarez | 21 |
| Providencia | Paula Jiménez | 20 |
| Pucón | Nicol Cavieres | 25 |
| Rancagua | Camila Durán | 23 |
| Santiago | Antonia Casanova | 24 |
| Talca | Nallely Bobadilla | 24 |
| Temuco | Sofía Bozzo | 20 |
| Valparaiso | Fernanda Mena | 32 |
| Viña del Mar | Florencia Rivera | 19 |
| Vitacura | Inna Moll | 28 |
