= Geraldine González =

Geraldine González may refer to:

- Geraldine González (model)
- Geraldine González (volleyball)
