= Miss Universo Chile 2016 =

- Date: November 9, 2016
- Presenters: Francisca García-Huidobro
- Venue: Studies of Chilevisión
- Broadcaster: Chilevisión
- Entrants: 15
- Placements: 8
- Winner: Catalina Cáceres

Miss Universo Chile 2016, the 53rd Miss Universo Chile pageant, was held on November 9, 2016. María Belén Jerez Spuler crowned Catalina Cáceres at end of the event. Cáceres represented Chile at Miss Universe 2016 pageant.

== Final results ==
Final results	Contestant
Miss Universo Chile 2016	Catalina Cáceres
1st Runner-up	Natividad Leiva
2nd Runner-up	Valentina Schnitzer
3rd Runner-up	Valentina Caballero
Semifinalists	Catalina Flores; Catalina Ulloa; Laura Jofré; Safka Pissani

== Delegates ==
The 15 official delegates were selected on several castings.

Name	Age	Height	Hometown
Natalia Lermanda Margarit	25	1.79 m (5 ft 10 1/2 in)	Santiago
Valentina Schnitzer Lihn	26	1.80 m (5 ft 11 in)	Vitacura
Patricia Andrea Montes Quintrequeo	23	1.74 m (5 ft 8 1/2 in)	Santiago
Diannella Lutka Maria Basic Isasi	22	1.68 m (5 ft 6 in)	Viña del Mar
Natividad Leiva Bello	24	1.80 m (5 ft 11 in)	Santiago
Safka Pissani Díaz	21	1.70 m (5 ft 7 in)	La Granja
María Catalina Flores Vargas	21	1.70 m (5 ft 7 in)	Concepción
Valentina Caballero Fuenzalida	24	1.68 m (5 ft 6 in)	Las Condes
Catalina Ignacia Figueroa Ulloa	21	1.70 m (5 ft 7 in)	La Ligua
Aylin López	21	1.70 m (5 ft 7 in)	La Cisterna
Francisca Hertz Henriquez	20	1.70 m (5 ft 7 in)	Vitacura
Laura Jofré Moyano	18	1.71 m (5 ft 7 1/2 in)	La Florida
Constanza Medina Marquez	24	1.72 m (5 ft 7 1/2 in)	La Florida
María José Subbrero Masserano	20	1.70 m (5 ft 7 in)	La Serena
Catalina Cáceres Ríos	26	1.75 m (5 ft 9 in)	Huechuraba

== Judges ==
- Photographer, painter and commentator of Chilean shows, Jordi Castell.
- Canadian/Chilean actress and musician, Vesta Lugg.
- Chilean model and businesswoman, Carolina Parsons.
- Venezuelan TV Host and social communicator, Harry Levy.

== Notes ==
- Valentina Schnitzer won the Miss Supranational Chile 2015 pageant and also participated in Reina Hispanoamericana 2017.
- Natividad Leiva won Miss Earth Chile 2015 pageant and finished as Top 8 in Miss Earth 2015. Also, she participated on Miss United Continents 2016 pageant in Guayaquil, Ecuador.
- Natalia Lermanda won Miss Earth Chile 2013 pageant and finished as Top 16 in Miss Earth 2013.
- Catalina Cáceres won Miss Earth Chile 2014 pageant.
- Charlotte Molina withdrew of the competition.
