= Miss Grand Chile 2023 =

5th edition of the Miss Grand Chile competition

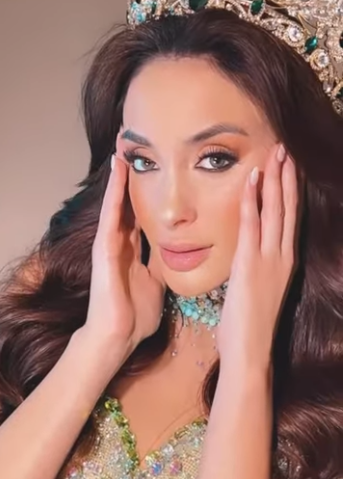
- Paula Henríquez, the winner of the contest
- Date: 18 June 2023
- Venue: Teatro ICTUS, Santiago de Chile
- Entrants: 6
- Placements: 3
- Debuts: La Reina
- Withdrawals: Chillán; Iquique; La Serena; Ñuñoa; Punta Arenas; Rancagua; San Pedro; Viña del Mar
- Winner: Paula Antonia Henríquez (Las Condes)

Miss Grand Chile 2023 was the fifth edition of the Miss Grand Chile pageant, held on 18 June 2023, at the Teatro ICTUS in Santiago de Chile. Six contestants, who qualified for the national final through a preliminary audition, competed for the title, of whom, a 27-year-old model from Las Condes, Paula Antonia Henríquez, was announced the winner, while Camila Joscelyn of Santiago Centro and Francisca Ramírez Matta of La Reina were named the runners-up.

The winner of the contest, Paula Henríquez, later represented Chile at the Miss Grand International 2023 pageant, held in Ho Chi Minh City, Vietnam, on 25 October, but was unplaced.

== Results ==
Final results	Contestant
Miss Grand Chile 2023	Las Condes - Paula Antonia Henríquez
1st runner-up	Santiago Centro - Camila Joscelyn
2nd runner-up	La Reina - Francisca Ramírez Matta

== Contestants ==
Initially, twelve candidates confirmed their participation but six withdrew, making the finalized of six contestants.

- Antofagasta – Naribe Diaz
- La Reina – Francisca Ramírez Matta
- Las Condes – Paula Antonia Henríquez
- Navidad – Melissa Astur
- Pudahuel – Sofia Astur
- Santiago Centro – Camila Joscelyn

Withdrawn contestants

- Arica – Yulitza Angulo Tello
- Curico – Cecilia Castilo
- Ñuñoa – Macarena Flores
- Machalí – Angie Marin Quiroz
- Puerto Montt – Alejandra Tautin
- Viña del Mar – Michaella Navarro
