= Miss Grand Chile 2019 =

2nd edition of the Miss Grand Chile competition

- Date: May 24, 2019
- Presenters: Pablo Schiilling
- Venue: Teatro Parque Cousiño, Santiago
- Entrants: 32
- Placements: 11
- Debuts: Alto Hospicio; Antofagasta; Araucanía; Biobío; Calama; Coquimbo; Iquique; La Reina; La Serena; Las Condes; Los Ángeles; Los Lagos; Machalí; Maule; Ñuñoa; O'Higgins; Ovalle; Quilicura; San Pedro; San Pedro de Atacama; Santiago Centro; Santiago Metro; Tarapacá; Temuco; Valparaíso; Villa Alemana; Viña del Mar
- Withdrawals: Chillán; Chillán Viejo; Pucón; Talca; Valdivia
- Winner: Francisca Lavandero (Los Ángeles)

External videos
- Grand final coronation, May 24, 2019

Miss Grand Chile 2019 was the second edition of the Miss Grand Chile beauty pageant, held on May 24, 2019, at the Teatro Parque Cousiño, Santiago. Thirty-two candidates competed for the title, of whom the representative of Los Ángeles, Francisca Lavandero, was announced the winner.

Francisca later represented Chile at the Miss Grand International 2019 pageant held on October 25 in Venezuela, and was placed among the top 20 finalists, making her the first Chilean representative to obtain the position at the Miss Grand International pageant.

== Results ==
Final results	Contestant
Miss Grand Chile 2019	Los Ángeles - Francisca Lavandero
1st runner-up	Viña del Mar - Ignacia Albornoz
2nd runner-up	Antofagasta - Vania Pamela
3rd runner-up	Iquique - Aylin Jaldin Fernández
4th runner-up	La Reina - Antonia Haeger
Top 11	Coquimbo - Paz Muñoz; La Serena - Constanza Sapunar; Las Condes - Agustina Montenegro; Machalí - Camila Vives; Quilicura - Camila Espinoza; Temuco - Vannia Cienfuegos

== Contestants ==
32 contestants competed for the title.

- Alto Hospicio – Constanza Hurtado
- Antofagasta – Vania Pamela
- Araucanía – Alannis La Rosa
- Biobío – Diana Pavez Obreque
- Calama – Valentina Rigotti
- Concepción – Ignacia Escobar
- Coquimbo – Paz Muñoz
- Independencia – Marling Rojas
- Iquique – Aylin Jaldin Fernández
- La Florida – Janis Zamorano
- La Reina – Antonia Haeger
- La Serena – Constanza Sapunar
- Las Condes – Agustina Montenegro
- Los Ángeles – Francisca Lavandero
- Los Lagos – Carla Mancilla
- Machalí – Camila Vives
- Maule – Daniela García
- Ñuñoa – Daniela Ahumada
- O'Higgins – Valentina Palacios
- Ovalle – Valery Cubillos
- Puerto Montt – Francisca Agurto
- Quilicura – Camila Espinoza
- Quillota – Carolina Cruz
- San Pedro – Paula Asecas
- San Pedro de Atacama – Javiera Gonzales
- Santiago Centro – Mariana Gallardo
- Santiago Metro – Veronica Mora
- Tarapacá – Romina Vega
- Temuco – Vannia Cienfuegos
- Valparaíso – Catarina Garrido
- Villa Alemana – Arlette Gómez
- Viña del Mar – Ignacia Albornoz
