= Miss Grand Chile 2021 =

3rd edition of the Miss Grand Chile competition

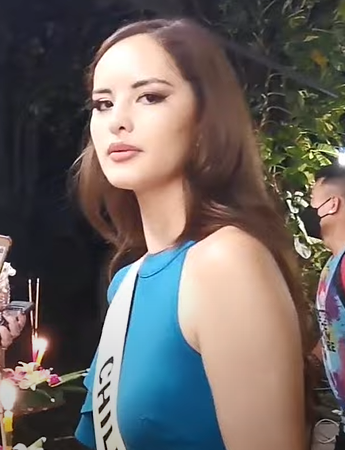
- Vanessa Echeverría, the winner of the contest
- Date: September 25, 2021
- Venue: Criss Chacana Model Agency, Iquique
- Entrants: 8
- Placements: 4
- Withdrawals: Araucanía; Biobío; Concepción; Coquimbo; La Florida; La Reina; La Serena; Las Condes; Los Ángeles; Los Lagos; Machalí; Maule; Ñuñoa; Ovalle; Puerto Montt; Quilicura; Quillota; San Pedro; Santiago Centro; Santiago Metro; Temuco; Valparaíso; Villa Alemana
- Winner: Vanessa Echeverría (San Pedro de Atacama)

Miss Grand Chile 2021 was the third edition of the Miss Grand Chile beauty pageant, held on September 25, 2021 at the Criss Chacana Model Agency, Iquique. Eight contestants competed for the title. Of whom Vanessa Echeverría of San Pedro de Atacama was elected the winner.

Vanessa later represented Chile in the international tournament, Miss Grand International 2021, held on December 4, 2021, in Bangkok, Thailand, but was unplaced.

== Results ==
| Final results | Contestant |
|---|---|
| Miss Grand Chile 2021 | San Pedro de Atacama - Vanessa Echeverría |
| 1st runner-up | Iquique - Adriana Machado |
| 2nd runner-up | Calama - Katia Andrea |
| 3rd runner-up | O'Higgins - Josefa Ramos Bastias |

== Contestants ==
8 contestants competed for the title.

| State | Contestant | Age | Ref. |
|---|---|---|---|
| Alto Hospicio | Mackarena Ignacia | 19 | |
| Antofagasta | Alisson Dubo | 18 | |
| Calama | Katia Andrea | 21 | |
| Iquique | Adriana Machado | 22 | |
| O'Higgins | Josefa Ramos Bastias | 21 | |
| San Pedro de Atacama | Vanessa Echeverría | 17 | |
| Tarapacá | Ruth Rojas | 20 | |
| Viña del Mar | Sara Hockino | 17 | |
