= Lenita Airisto =

Finnish journalist and businesswoman (1937–2026)

- Airisto in 1976
- Born: Hymmi Lenita Aulikki Airisto; 1 January 1937; Helsinki, Finland
- Died: 9 November 2026 (aged 89)
- Occupations: Businesswoman; television journalist; author; promoter
- Spouse: Ingvar S. Melin (m. 1961; div. 1971)
- Beauty pageant titleholder
- Title: Suomen Neito 1954
- Major competition: Miss Universe 1954

Hymmi Lenita Aulikki Airisto (1 January 1937 – 9 November 2026) was a Finnish businesswoman, television journalist, author and promoter of Finnish industrial and cultural exports. She was also a beauty pageant titleholder, having won the title of Suomen Neito in 1954 and represented Finland at the Miss Universe 1954 pageant.

== Life and career ==
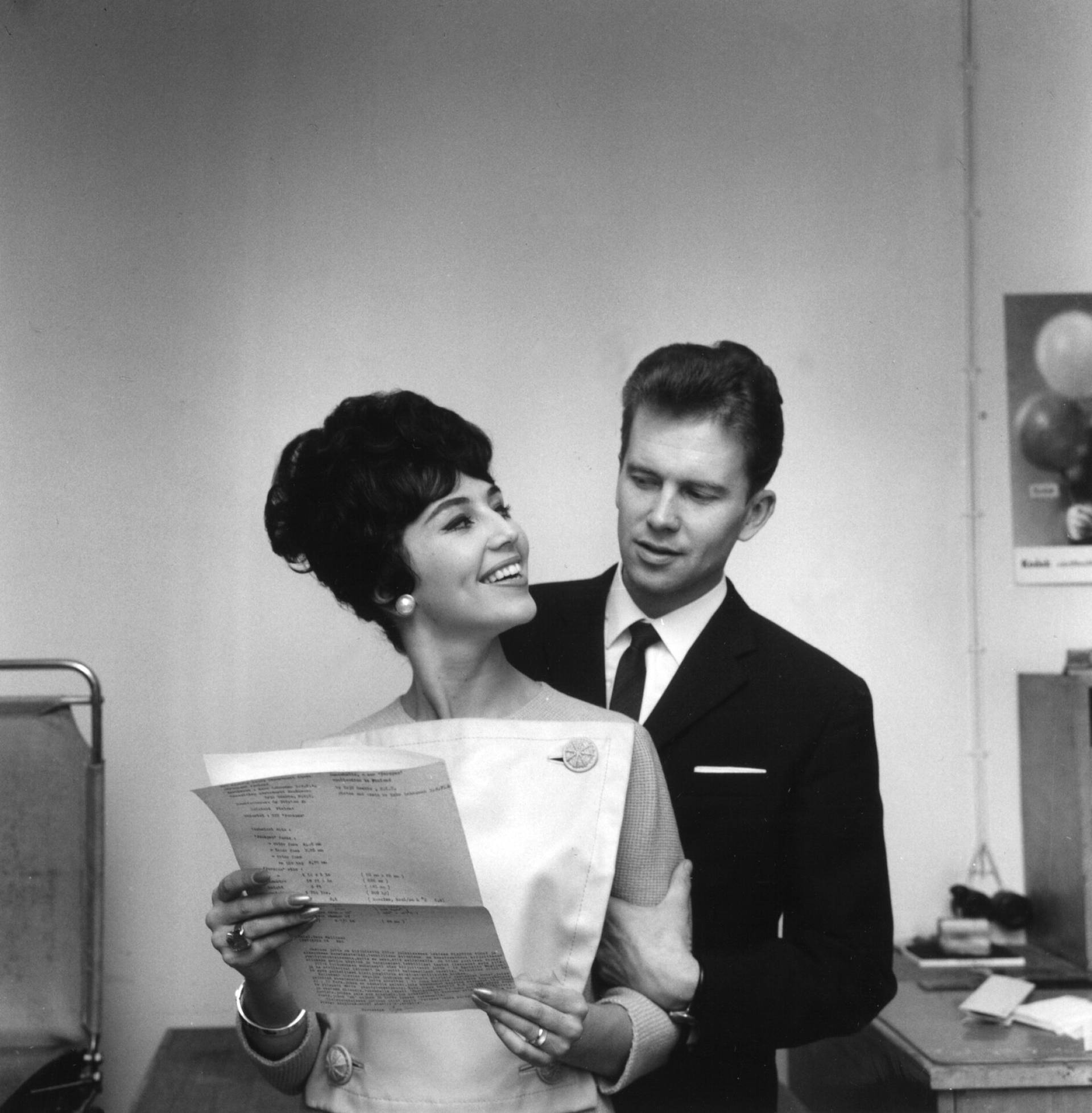
Airisto and Ingvar S. Melin in 1961

=== Maiden of Finland ===
Airisto began her public career in 1954 when she won the title of Suomen Neito (English: Maiden of Finland), a beauty pageant organized by the Disabled War Veterans' Association of Finland. Her duties involved raising funds to support the rehabilitation of men who had been severely wounded in the Winter War and Continuation War during the late 1930s and early 1940s, helping them return to normal life. Following this, she represented Finland at the Miss Universe 1954 pageant.

=== Education ===
Working as a fashion model provided Airisto with the financial means to pursue academic studies in Finland and abroad. She earned a Bachelor of Science (BSc) degree from the Swedish-speaking Hanken School of Economics in Helsinki, Finland. She then studied TV journalism at BBC and ITV studios in London, RTF in Paris, and with German TV channels in Hamburg, Munich, and Berlin. Airisto also attended Stanford University in California, further enhancing her education. Her studies culminated in practical experience at various TV studios in Los Angeles, including an internship with the Steve Allen show. During this time, Allen invited her to join him live on air to introduce American TV viewers to Finland and Finns on the NBC channel.

=== Career ===
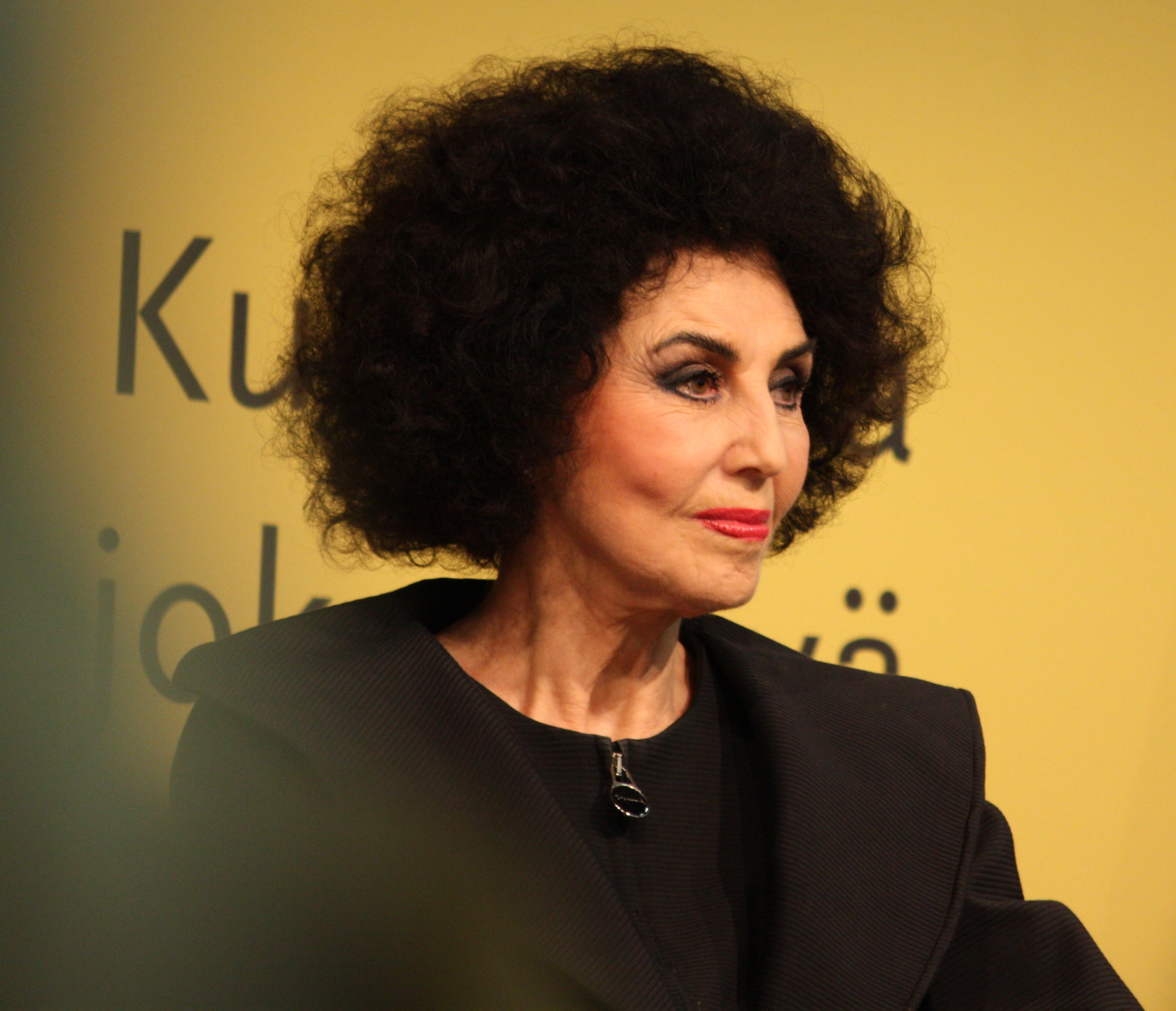
Airisto in 2010

Airisto had a career as a television journalist spanning over 30 years, during which she appeared on more than 300 prime-time current affairs shows. In addition to her television work, she produced, designed, and executed export promotions for both individual companies and the broader export industry globally, with her first international campaigns targeting media and customers in the 1960s. Airisto also lectured extensively at universities, schools of economics, and other academic institutions, drawing from her numerous books.

=== Recognition ===
In 2008, a survey commissioned by Taloustutkimus confirmed Airisto's influence in Finland, ranking her among the ten most influential women in the country. She was also nominated as Woman of the Year, and decorated with the First Class of the Order of the Lion of Finland.

=== Public figure ===
Airisto was a prominent public figure and frequent opinion-maker, often weighing in on topics related to style and etiquette. She is perhaps best known for making it more socially unacceptable to wear tennis socks with a suit in Finland during the 1980s, a practice that was previously common among Finnish businessmen abroad. Over the years, she also criticized politicians, including Matti Vanhanen, for their insufficient language skills.

=== Death ===
Airisto died on 9 November 2026 at the age of 89.
