= Jordi Castell =

Chilean photographer and television presenter (born 1966)

Jordi Castell Abusleme
- Born: Jordi Andree Castell Abusleme; 3 November 1966 (age 60); San Fernando, Chile
- Occupation: Photographer

Jordi Andree Castell Abusleme (born 3 November 1966 in San Fernando, Chile) is a Chilean photographer and television presenter.

== Biography ==
When Castell was a child, his father left him and his mother, Mildred Abusleme de la Vega, and moved to France. Castell was raised by his mother and her family. He has said that his grandfather, Salvador Abusleme, was the real father figure in his life. He said this after meeting his father in the 1990s. He is of Palestinian descent.

Castell went to the Instituto San Fernando, a Marist school in his hometown. He then moved to Talca and studied at the Liceo Abate Molina, before finishing secondary school at the Liceo Luis Cruz Martínez in Curicó. He later moved to Santiago, where he studied audiovisual communication at UNIACC. In 1994, he completed a master's degree in photography at the Catalan School of Photography in Barcelona, Spain.

Castell is openly gay.

In 2013, he appeared in a YouTube video supporting Andrés Velasco's presidential campaign.

=== Career ===
He has worked as an image consultant for media outlets and companies. For eleven years he was a portrait photographer for the newspaper El Mercurio, working on sections such as Zona de Contacto, Ya and Vivienda y Decoración. He also wrote columns for the magazines Blank and Arte al Límite.

He has had seven solo exhibitions and taken part in twenty group exhibitions. He has also managed and curated several photography projects.

Castell also works in television. He started in 2003 as an entertainment commentator on Midnight: Culture and Entertainment, a late-night programme on TVN hosted by Freddy Stock. The same year, he had a segment called "Portafolio" on Chilevisión's SQP. After working on Viva la mañana on Canal 13, he returned to Chilevisión in 2004, where he hosted Maldito amor and the celebrity show Primer Plano. In 2006, he took part in the first season of Canal 13's dance contest Locos por el baile and finished second. He returned as a judge for the second season in 2007.

Castell was also one of the first openly gay men on television in Chile.

Castell also served as academic director of the School of Art Direction at UNIACC.

== Activism ==
In 2010 he participated in a National Women's Service (Sernam) campaign against violence against women. He appeared on posters and in TV adverts with the slogan "Maricón es el que maltrata a una mujer" ("A faggot is a man who abuses a woman"). Some LGBT groups, including Acción Gay, criticized the campaign as discriminatory. In 2011, he appeared in another Sernam campaign with a similar message. A few days after the campaign was announced, leaflets with homophobic insults against Castell were handed out in Providencia, Santiago. The Movement for Homosexual Integration and Liberation (Movilh) condemned the leaflets. Castell and Sernam filed a police complaint for threats, to find out who was behind the leaflets.

== Controversy ==
In December 2011, Castell got into a public dispute with the impressionist Stefan Kramer over an impression of him that mocked his sexual orientation. Castell threatened to make details of Kramer's private life public. Some people, such as the TV presenter Carola Julio, called this extortion by Castell. He also announced that he would sue Kramer. The dispute was later settled with a financial agreement, and Kramer agreed to tone down his impressions of Castell.

== Television ==
Year	Program	Role	Channel
2003	Midnight: Culture and Entertainment	Commentator	TVN
2003	SQP	Commentator	Chilevisión
2004	Viva la mañana	Fashion Commentator	Canal 13
2004	The move of the Festival	Panelist	Canal 13
2004–2005	Maldito amor	Host	Chilevisión
2005	Urban Dreams	Host	Chilevisión
2005–2013	Primer Plano	Host	Chilevisión
2006–2007	Sins	Host	Chilevisión
2006	Locos por el baile	Contestant	Channel 13
2007	Locos por el baile 2	Judge	Canal 13
2009	Dance Fever 2 (Bypass)	Contestant	Chilevisión
2009	Behind the screen	Host	Chilevisión
2010	SQP	Panelist	Chilevisión
2011–2013	Gala of the Festival of Viña del Mar	Host	Chilevisión
2011	2011 Viña del Mar International Song Festival	Judge	Chilevisión
2011	Fans of dance	Host	Chilevisión
2012	people like you	Stand-in host	Chilevisión
2012–2013	Diamonds in the Rough	Host	Chilevisión
2013	Baila! To the rhythm of a dream	Judge	Chilevisión
2014	Buenos Días a Todos	Panelist	TVN
2014	Yellow Earth Festival	Presenter	TVN
2014	Adopts a famous	Contestant	TVN
2014	Live in Viña TVN	Panelist	TVN
2016	2016 Miss Universe Chile	Judge	Chilevisión

== Works ==
=== General exhibitions ===
- Study narcissism (1992)
- Pictures, Palma de Mallorca, Spain. (1994)
- Pictures (1997)
- Pictures (2000)
- In the water (2001)
- Pictures (2003)
- Woman I (2011)

=== Art exhibitions ===
- Urban Lens 1 and 2 Lucky Strike (2001)
- The other center (2003)
- AM (2003)
