= Miss Universo Chile 2014 =

- Date: December 8th, 2014
- Presenters: Marlen Olivari
- Entertainment: Catalina Palacios
- Venue: Renaissance Santiago Hotel
- Entrants: 15
- Withdrawals: María Belén Jerez, Francisca Barrera
- Winner: Hellen Toncio

Miss Universo Chile 2014, the 51st Miss Universo Chile pageant, was held on December 8, 2014. María Jesús Matthei crowned Hellen Toncio as her successor at end of the event. Hellen will represent Chile at Miss Universe 2014 pageant to be held in Miami, United States.

== Delegates ==
The 15 official delegates were selected on October 26.

Represents	Name	Age	Height	Hometown
Rapa Nui	Veri Irene Teave Tuki	21	1.73 m (5 ft 8 in)	Hanga Roa
Maule	María José del Río Céspedes	22	1.72 m (5 ft 8 in)	Santiago
Región Metropolitana	Natividad Leiva Bello	22	1.80 m (5 ft 11 in)	Santiago
Magallanes	Ivana Belén Simunovic Aburto	23	1.67 m (5 ft 6 in)	Santiago
Tarapacá	Paula Antonia Henríquez Vargas	19	1.78 m (5 ft 10 in)	Concepción
Bío Bío	Nicolé Celeste Huerque Arancibia	22	1.71 m (5 ft 7 in)	Temuco
Atacama	Tamara Francisca Nakamura Cepeda	21	1.71 m (5 ft 7 in)	Santiago
Aysén	Tamara Sofía Bernales Alvarado	21	1.73 m (5 ft 8 in)	Santiago
Arica y Parinacota	Camila Javiera Sanhueza Gajardo	27	1.73 m (5 ft 8 in)	La Serena
Araucanía	Valentina Schnitzer Lihn	24	1.80 m (5 ft 11 in)	Santiago
Coquimbo	Carolina Anali Bichara Muñoz	23	1.75 m (5 ft 9 in)	Santiago
Los Ríos	Florencia Elena Caces Burotto	21	1.70 m (5 ft 7 in)	Concepción
Antofagasta	Jocelyn Angélica Talamilla Muñóz	25	1.70 m (5 ft 7 in)	Antofagasta
O'Higgins	Hellen Marlene Toncio Salazar	20	1.73 m (5 ft 8 in)	Rancagua
Valparaíso	Javiera Villarroel Zaio	24	1.71 m (5 ft 7 in)	Viña Del Mar

== Results ==
=== Placements ===
Placement	Contestant
Miss Universo Chile 2014	Hellen Toncio
1st Runner-Up	Natividad Leiva
2nd Runner-Up	Veri Irene Teave
3rd Runner-Up	Ivana Simunovic
Top 8	Valentina Schnitzer; María José Del Río; Jocelyn Talamilla; Tamara Bernales

=== Special awards ===
- Miss Popularidad 2014 - Ivana Simunovic

== Notes ==
- Miss Rapa Nui was held on September 12 in Hotel Hanga Roa, Rapa Nui. The judges were María Jesús Matthei, Marlen Olivari, Juan Sastre (National Director of Miss Universo Chile), Manoa Frugé-Terorotua (Miss Tahiti) and Hetu'u Rapu (Miss Universo Chile 1997), among others. The winner was Veri Irene Teave.
- Francisca Barrera and Tamara Bernales were finalists in the Miss Earth Chile 2014 pageant.
- Jocelyn Talamilla was crowned "Miss Antofagasta 2014" in March 2014, and also she represented Chile in Miss Sea World 2013, in Perú, where she became the 2nd runner-up.
- María Belén Jerez and Francisca Barrera withdrew from the competition.
- Valentina Schnitzer won Miss Supranational Chile 2015 pageant.
- Natividad Leiva won Miss Earth Chile 2015 pageant and finished Top 8 in Miss Earth 2015 and also won Miss Universo Chile 2017 pageant.
- María Belén Jerez was appointed as Miss Universo Chile 2015.
