= Andrée English School =

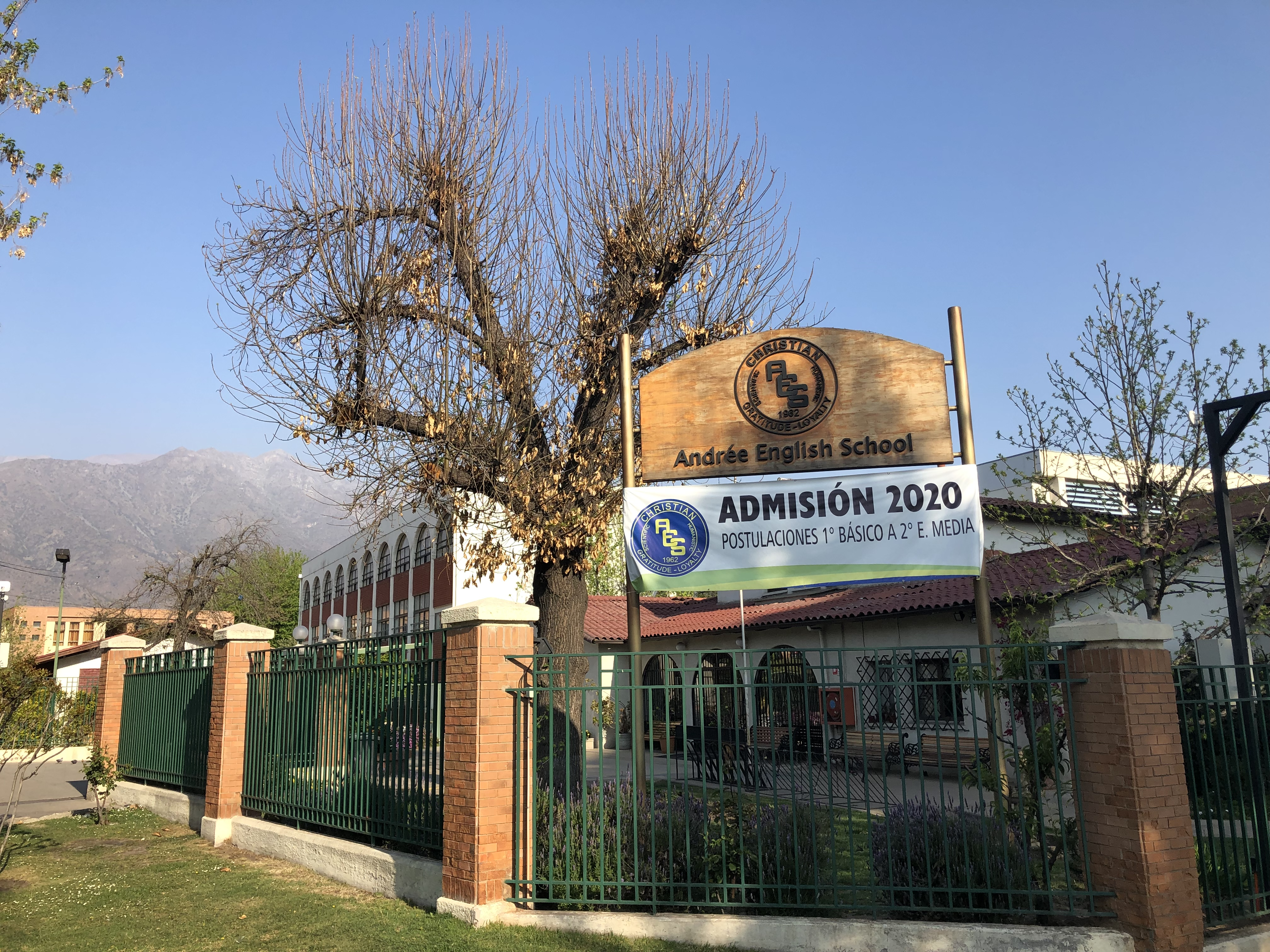

Location
- Avda. Príncipe de Gales 7605; La Reina, Santiago Metropolitan Region; Chile; 33°26′25″S 70°33′04″W

Information
- Type: Private School
- Established: 1962
- Principal: Micheline Minder
- Grades: K-12
- Enrollment: 1,920 (as of 2016)
- Color
- Website: http://www.andree.cl/

Andrée English School is a Private, Christian School in La Reina, Santiago, Chile which is considered bilingual due to its emphasis on English.

== About ==
The school was founded in 1962 by Janine Chanut de Minder in the Providencia sector of Santiago. It had 14 students during its first full year, 221 in 1966, and 337 in 1968. Andrée moved to its current location in La Reina in 1982. Its campus is about 7 acres in total size and includes a media center, gymnasium, and several soccer fields (not full-size).

The school, like most Chilean schools, does not use a credit system to graduate, meaning elective choices are limited. The school is split into four 'cycles': Infant School (Pre-K to Kindergarten), Junior School (1st Grade to 4th Grade), Middle School (5th Grade to 8th Grade), and Senior School (9th Grade to 12th Grade).
