= Miss Grand Chile 2022 =

3rd edition of the Miss Grand Chile competition

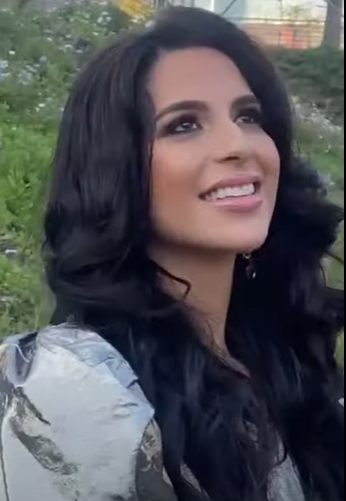
- Karina Perez, the winner of the contest
- Date: May 28, 2022
- Venue: Criss Chacana Model Agency, Iquique
- Entrants: 9
- Placements: 6
- Debuts: Punta Arenas; Rancagua
- Withdrawals: Alto Hospicio; Antofagasta; Calama; O'Higgins; Tarapacá
- Returns: Chillán; La Serena; Las Condes; Ñuñoa
- Winner: Karina Pérez Gres (Las Condes)

Miss Grand Chile 2022 was the fourth edition of the Miss Grand Chile pageant, held on May 28, 2022, at the Criss Chacana Model Agency, Iquique. COntestants from 9 cities competed for the title. Of whom the representative of Las Condes, Karina Pérez Gres, was announced the winner. She then represented Chile at the Miss Grand International 2022 pageant held on October 25 in Indonesia, but got a non-placement.

== Results ==
Final results	Contestant
Miss Grand Chile 2022	Las Condes - Karina Pérez Gres
1st runner-up	Viña del Mar - Krishna Sandoval
2nd runner-up	Punta Arenas - Tamara Reusch
Top 6	Chillán - Javi Solange Delgado; Iquique - Valeria Fernanda; La Serena - Damary Campusano

== Contestants ==
Nine contestants competed for the title.

- Chillán – Javi Solange Delgado
- Iquique – Valeria Fernanda
- La Serena – Damary Campusano
- Las Condes – Karina Pérez Gres
- Ñuñoa – Paola Guerra
- Punta Arenas – Tamara Reusch
- Rancagua – Giuliana Avilés
- San Pedro de Atacama – Javi Plaza Milles
- Viña del Mar – Krishna Sandoval

Withdrawn contestant

- Santiago Centro – Sofia Muñoz Feifel
