= Daniela Nicolás =

Chilean model, actress, and beauty pageant titleholder

- Born: Daniela Elsa Nicolás Gómez; 26 June 1992 (age 34); Copiapó, Chile
- Education: Andrés Bello National University
- Occupations: Actress; model; television presenter; beauty pageant titleholder
- Beauty pageant titleholder
- Title: Miss Universe Copiapó 2020; Miss Universe Chile 2020
- Hair color: Blonde
- Eye color: Blue
- Major competitions: Miss Universe Chile 2020 (Winner); Miss Universe 2020 (Unplaced)

Daniela Elsa Nicolás Gómez (born 26 June 1992) is a Chilean actress, model, TV host and beauty pageant titleholder who was crowned Miss Universe Chile 2020. She represented Chile at Miss Universe 2020. Outside of pageantry, Nicolás has appeared as an actress on Chilean television series such as Mamá Mechona (2013–14), Veinteañero a los 40 (2016), and Wena profe (2017).

== Early life and education ==
Nicolás was born on 26 June 1992 in Copiapó to Lebanese immigrant parents. After completing high school, Nicolás enrolled in a university program to study dentistry, although she later switched her studies to journalism. In 2013, Nicolás left university in order to begin a career in acting. She opted to return to her studies in 2020, enrolling in Andrés Bello National University as a journalism student.

In 2015, Nicolás was diagnosed with the autoimmune disease undifferentiated connective tissue disease, and went on to volunteer with causes that assist children diagnosed with the disease.

== Career ==
=== Television ===
Nicolás began her career in television acting in 2013, after being cast by Canal 13 in the Chilean television series Mamá Mechona. She portrayed the antagonist Rebeca Lorenzini from 2013 until departing from the show in 2014. After leaving Mamá Mechona, Nicolás appeared in supporting roles as Gracia Montero in Veinteañero a los 40 in 2016, Constanza Marshall in Wena profe in 2017, and Sofía Echaurren in the Chilevisión series Gemelas from 2019 until 2020. In addition to acting in television, Nicolás also worked as a television presenter with Fox Sports Chile in 2016.

=== Pageantry ===
Nicolás began her career in pageantry in 2020, after being selected as Miss Universe Copiapó in the Miss Universe Chile 2020 competition. Nicolás was one of the 25 semifinalists, before advancing as one of the eight finalists in November 2020. That month, she competed in the live finals, where she advanced into the top four before being announced as the winner. Upon her win, she became the first Miss Universe Chile to hail from Copiapó since 1973.

As Miss Universe Chile, Nicolás represented Chile at Miss Universe 2020, where she was unplaced.

== Filmography ==
Year	Title	Role	Notes
2013–14	Mamá Mechona	Rebeca Lorenzini	107 episodes
2016	Veinteañero a los 40	Gracia Montero	87 episodes
2017	Wena profe	Constanza Marshall	Episode: "Episode #1.02"
2019–20	Gemelas	Sofía Echaurren	4 episodes

Awards and achievements
Preceded by Geraldine González	Miss Universo Chile; 2020	Succeeded by Antonia Figueroa
