= Hellen Toncio =

Chilean beauty pageant winner (born 1994)

- Born: Hellen Toncio; April 17, 1994 (age 32); Rancagua, Chile
- Height: 1.73 m (5 ft 8 in)
- Beauty pageant titleholder
- Title: Miss Universo Chile 2014
- Hair color: Black
- Eye color: Black
- Major competitions: Miss Universo Chile 2014 (Winner); Miss Universe 2014 (Unplaced)

Hellen Toncio (born April 17, 1994) is a Chilean volleyball player and beauty pageant titleholder who was crowned Miss Universo Chile 2014 and represented Chile at the Miss Universe 2014.

== Early life ==
Hellen is an odontology student and a volleyball player in Chile.

== Pageantry ==
=== Miss Universo Chile 2014 ===
Hellen was crowned Miss Universo Chile 2014 and represented O'Higgins region.

=== Miss Universe 2014 ===
Hellen represented Chile at Miss Universe 2014 in United States but was unplaced.

Awards and achievements
Preceded by María Jesús Matthei	Miss Universo Chile; 2014	Succeeded by María Belén Jerez Spuler
