= Eulogio Sánchez Airport =

Eulogio Sánchez Airport Tobalaba Airport
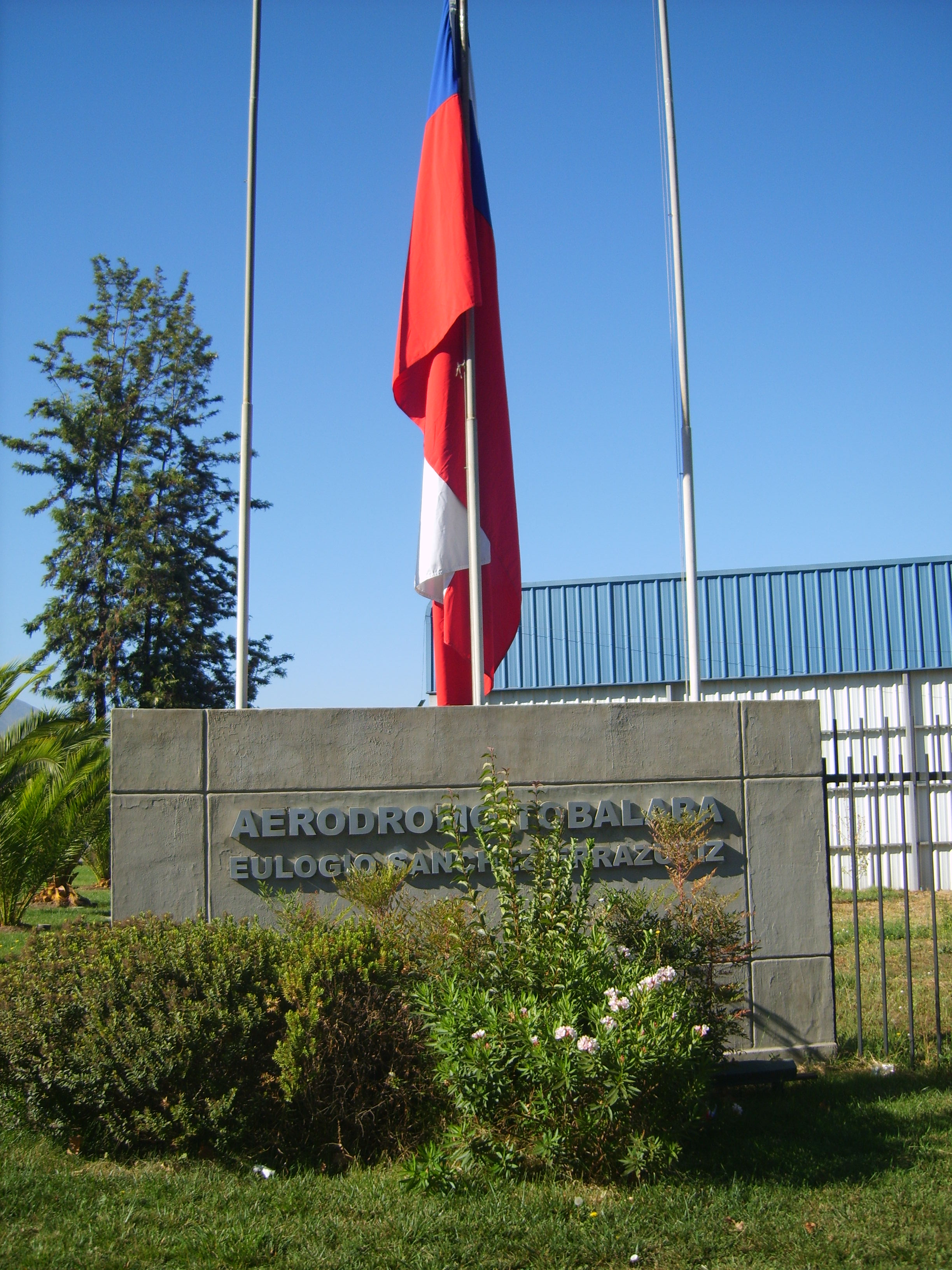
- IATA: none; ICAO: SCTB

Summary
- Airport type: Public
- Owner/Operator: Club Aéreo de Santiago, Club Aéreo de Carabineros de Chile
- Serves: Santiago, Chile
- Location: La Reina
- Built: 1954
- Elevation AMSL: 2,129 ft (649 m)
- Coordinates: 33°27′23″S 70°32′48″W

Map
- Location of the airport in Chile

Runways
| Direction | Length | | Surface |
| Direction | m | ft | Surface |
|---|---|---|---|
| 01/19 | 965 | 3,166 | Asphalt |
- Sources: GCM Google Maps Aerodromo.cl

Eulogio Sánchez Airport (Spanish: Aeródromo Eulogio Sánchez) (ICAO: SCTB), also known as Tobalaba Airport, is an airport in La Reina, an eastern suburb of Santiago, Chile. It is two-thirds owned by the Club Aéreo de Santiago and one-third owned by the Club Aéreo de Carabineros de Chile. Also, it holds the headquarters of Airbus Helicopters Chile S.A.

The airport consists of 120 acres on the eastern edge of the Santiago metropolitan area. It was constructed in 1954 and named for the then-president of the Club Aéreo de Santiago, Eulogio Sánchez Errazuriz (1903–1956). Its taxiways, runway and fuel platform are the only public use infrastructure areas at the airport. It is home to about 100 aircraft, a restaurant and a public park next to the main entrance in Alcalde Fernando Castillo Velasco Avenue.

Runway 19 has an additional 170 metres (560 ft) displaced threshold.

== Operations ==
Eulogio Sánchez Airport is home to Club Aéreo de Santiago, Club Aéreo de Carabineros, Airbus Helicopters Chile S.A. and more, while organisms such as PDI (Policía de Investigaciones), Ecocopter, RomeoMike, Aeromet and SumaAir see a lot of operations in and out of Tobalaba.

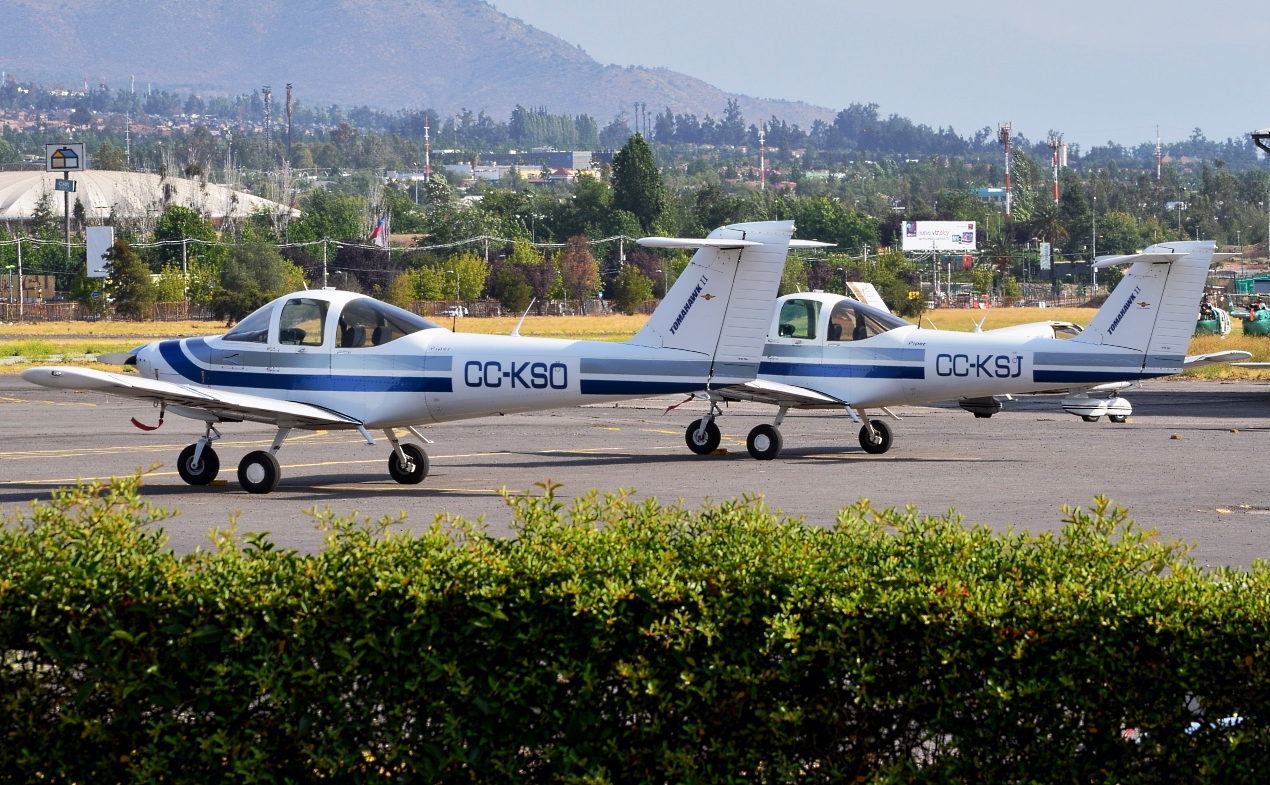
Two Piper PA-38 Tomahawks sitting at one of many parking spots at Tobalaba Airport.

== See also ==
- Transport in Chile
- List of airports in Chile
