= Esther Saavedra Yoacham =

Chilean beauty pageant titleholder (1928–2017)

- Born: María Esther Saavedra Yoacham; 8 August 1928; Santiago, Chile
- Died: 13 August 2017 (aged 89); Valparaíso, Chile
- Beauty pageant titleholder
- Title: Miss Chile 1952
- Hair color: Black
- Eye color: Black

María Esther Saavedra Yoacham (August 8, 1928 – August 13, 2017) was a Chilean beauty pageant titleholder who was crowned Miss Chile 1952, becoming the first-ever winner of the Miss Chile competition. She had beat out over 200 young women to win the pageant, sponsored by the women's magazine "Eva."

In 1952, Esther earned the first Miss Chile title, becoming the official representative for Chile in the first Miss Universe pageant, which was held on 28 June 1952 at the Long Beach Municipal Auditorium in California, United States.

Esther died on August 13, 2017, in Santiago, at the age of 89. According to El Mercurio, her funeral was at 1:00 pm in the General Cemetery.

| Preceded by Title established | Miss Chile; 1952 | Succeeded by Gloria Leguisos |
