= Miss Universe 1952 =

1st Miss Universe pageant

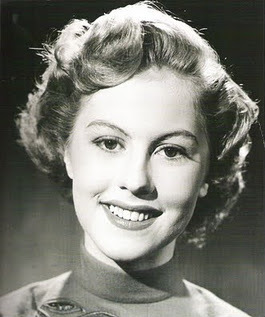
- Armi Kuusela
- Date: 28 June 1952
- Presenters: Bob Russell
- Venue: Long Beach Municipal Auditorium, Long Beach, California, United States
- Entrants: 30
- Placements: 10
- Debuts: Alaska; Australia; Belgium; Canada; Chile; Cuba; Denmark; Finland; France; Great Britain; Greece; Hawaii; Hong Kong; India; Israel; Italy; Japan; Mexico; Norway; Panama; Peru; Philippines; Puerto Rico; South Africa; Sweden; Turkey; United States; Uruguay; Venezuela; West Germany
- Winner: Armi Kuusela: Finland; (Relinquished)
- Congeniality: Myriam Lynn (Belgium); Valerie Johnson (Montana)

Miss Universe 1952 was the first Miss Universe pageant, held at the Long Beach Municipal Auditorium in Long Beach, California, on 28 June 1952.

At the conclusion of the event, actress Piper Laurie crowned Armi Kuusela of Finland as Miss Universe 1952.

Contestants from thirty countries and territories participated in this year's pageant. The pageant was hosted by Bob Russell. The competition featured the Romanov Imperial Nuptial Crown, which was previously owned by a Russian czar. The crown was said to have 1,535 diamonds, 300 carats, and was valued at $500,000.

== Background ==
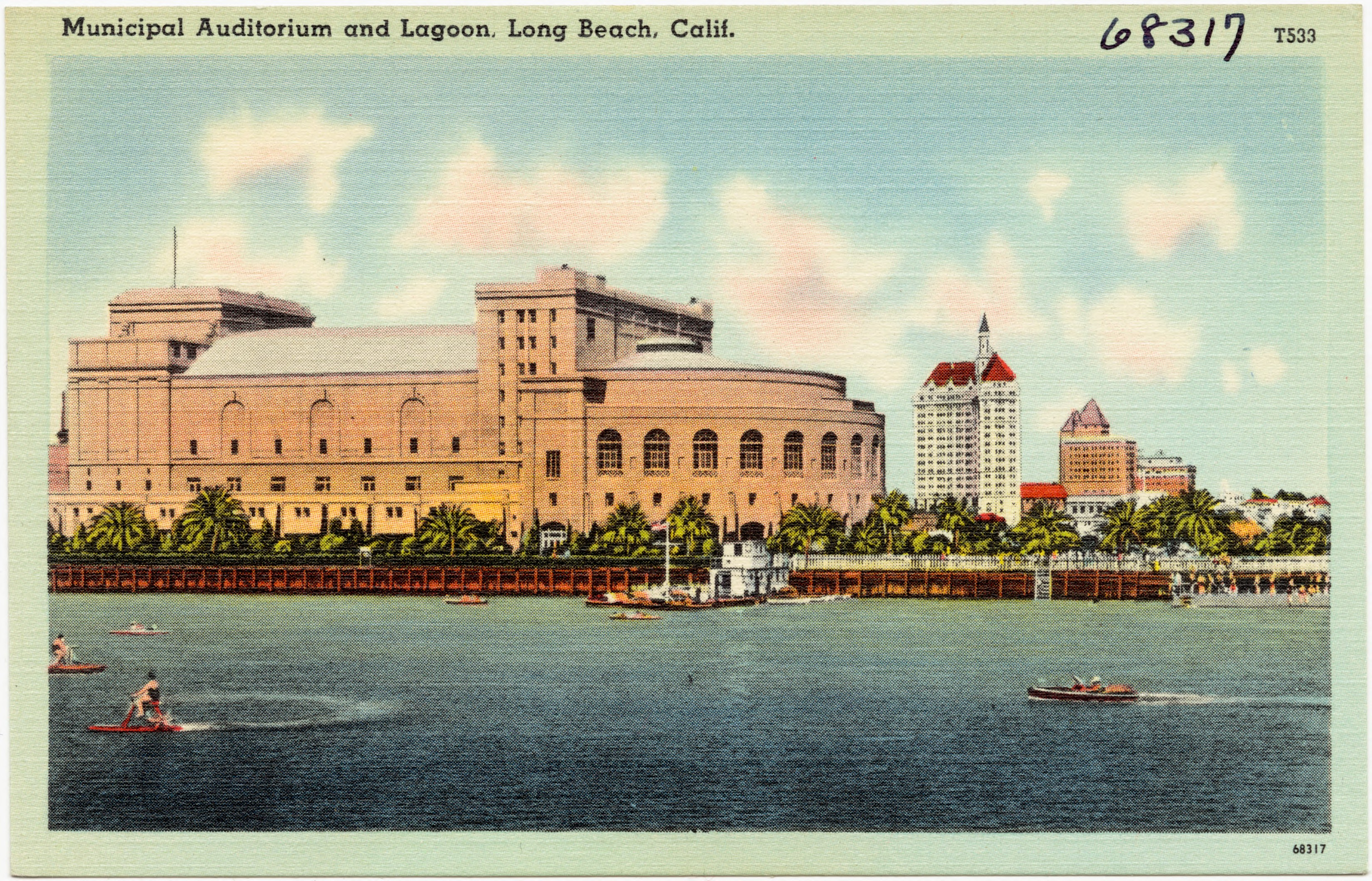
Long Beach Municipal Auditorium, the venue of Miss Universe 1952

=== Location and date ===
After Miss America 1951, Yolande Betbeze refused to pose for a publicity picture wearing a swimsuit from Catalina Swimwear, then-Miss Universe executive producer Oliver Reinhardt negotiated in with the officials of Pan American World Airways and Catalina Swimwear to sponsor the Miss Universe pageant, which will be held in Long Beach, California. The city of Long Beach provided $30,000 USD for the competition to be held from 23 June to 30 June 1952.

=== Selection of participants ===
Thirty contestants from around the world competed in the competition for the first time. The age requirement in this edition is from eighteen to twenty-eight, where women who are married and have children can also participate. Indrani Rahman of India became the first contestant to be married with children.

This policy was changed in 1957 where the participation of women who are married or already have children was prohibited. This policy was then reinstated in 2023. One contestant was selected to replace the original dethroned winner.

==== Replacements ====
Gladys Rubio, Runner-Up of Miss Uruguay 1952, was appointed to represent Uruguay after the winner, Rosa Adela Prunell, withdrew because her mother wanted to accompany her.

==== Debuts ====
This edition saw the debuts of Alaska, Australia, Belgium, Canada, Chile, Cuba, Denmark, Finland, France, Great Britain, Greece, Hawaii, Hong Kong, India, Israel, Italy, Japan, Mexico, Norway, Panama, Peru, the Philippines, Puerto Rico, South Africa, Sweden, Turkey, the United States, Uruguay, Venezuela and the West Germany.

Elisabeth van Proosdij of Holland was set to compete for the first time but withdrew because she was already married during her reign, despite Miss Universe permitting married contestants. Leila Teresa Tuma of Syria withdrew due to political tensions in her country. Brazil and the Republic of China were invited but withdrew due to insufficient preparations for national pageants.

== Results ==
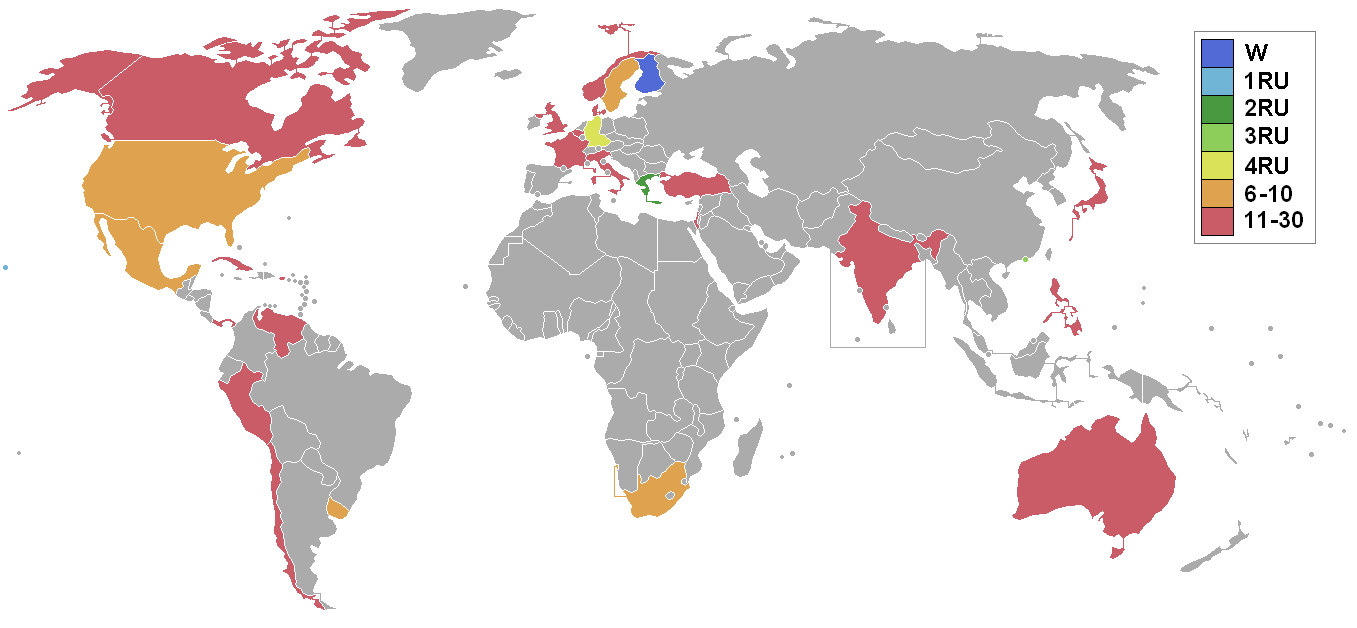
Miss Universe 1952 participating countries and territories

=== Placements ===
Placement	Contestant
Miss Universe 1952	Finland – Armi Kuusela(relinquished) (Note: Kuusela relinquished her title as Miss Universe 1952 shortly before her reign was scheduled to end to marry Filipino businessman, Virgilio Hilario, on May 4, 1953. Despite this, her resignation was not made official by the Miss Universe Organization.)
1st Runner-Up	Hawaii – Elsa Edsman
2nd Runner-Up	Greece – Ntaizy Mavraki
3rd Runner-Up	Hong Kong – Judy Dan
4th Runner-Up	West Germany – Renate Hoy
Top 10	Mexico – Olga Llorens Pérez; South Africa – Catherine Higgins; Sweden – Anne Marie Tistler; United States – Jacqueline Loughery; Uruguay – Gladys Rubio

=== Special awards ===
Award	Contestant
Miss Amity	Belgium – Myriam Lynn
Miss Friendship	Montana – Valerie Johnson
Most Popular Girl in Parade	Chile – Esther Saavedra
Miss Welcome to Long Beach	Jeri Miller

== Contestants ==
Thirty contestants competed for the title.

Country/Territory	Contestant	Age (Note: Ages at the time of the pageant)	Hometown
Alaska	Shirley Burnett	19	Fairbanks
Australia	Leah McCartney	19	Elwood
Belgium	Myriam Lynn	25	Brussels
Canada	Ruth Carrier	21	Ontario
Chile	Esther Saavedra	23	Santiago
Cuba	Gladys López	20	Havana
Denmark	Hanne Sørensen	20	Copenhagen
Finland	Armi Kuusela	17	Muhos
France	Claude Godard	22	Paris
Great Britain	Aileen Chase	21	London
Greece	Ntaizy Mavraki	18	Athens
Hawaii	Elsa Edsman	20	Honolulu
Hong Kong	Judy Dan	21	Hong Kong
India	Indrani Rahman	21	Chennai
Israel	Ora Vered	18	Tel Aviv
Italy	Giovanna Mazzotti	19	Lombardy
Japan	Himeko Kojima	20	Osaka
Mexico	Olga Llorens Pérez	21	Ciudad Juárez
Norway	Eva Røine	24	Oslo
Panama	Gisela Malek	18	Coclé
Peru	Ada Bueno	18	Apurímac
Philippines	Teresita Sanchez	19	Malolos
Puerto Rico	Marilia Levy	20	Lares
South Africa	Catherine Higgins	19	Transvaal
Sweden	Anne Marie Tistler	19	Stockholm
Turkey	Gelengül Tayfuroğlu	18	Ankara
United States	Jacqueline Loughery	21	Brooklyn
Uruguay	Gladys Rubio	21	Montevideo
Venezuela	Sofía Silva	23	Tumeremo
West Germany	Renate Hoy	21	Ludwigshafen

== Notes ==
1. Kuusela relinquished her title as Miss Universe 1952 shortly before her reign was scheduled to end to marry Filipino businessman, Virgilio Hilario, on May 4, 1953. Despite this, her resignation was not made official by the Miss Universe Organization.
2. Ages at the time of the pageant
