= Miss Grand Chile 2017 =

1st edition of the Miss Grand Chile competition

- Date: September 22, 2017
- Venue: Centro de Eventos Music Palace, Talca
- Entrants: 9
- Placements: 4
- Debuts: Chillán; Chillán Viejo; Concepción; La Florida; Pucón; Puerto Montt; Quillota; Talca; Valdivia
- Winner: Nicole Ebner (La Florida)

External videos
- Grand final coronation, September 22, 2017

Miss Grand Chile 2017 was the first edition of the Miss Grand Chile beauty pageant, held on September 22, 2017, at the Centro de Eventos Music Palace, Talca. Contestants from 9 cities competed for the title. Of whom the representative of La Florida, Nicole Ebner, was named the winner. Nicole then represented Chile at Miss Grand International 2017 held on October 25 in Vietnam, but got a non-placement.

In addition to crowning such the winner, the Miss Supranational Chile 2017 title was also awarded to Konstanza Schmidt of Quillota, and one of the finalists, María Flores of Concepción, was later assigned to participate at the Miss Grand International 2018 held in Myanmar in the following year.

== Results ==
Final results	Contestant
Miss Grand Chile 2017	La Florida - Nicole Ebner
Miss Supranational Chile 2017	Quillota - Konstanza Schmidt
1st runner-up	Puerto Montt - Muriel Berner
2nd runner-up	Chillán Viejo - Sol Vargas Sepulveda

== Contestants ==
9 contestants took part in the competition.

City	Contestant
Chillán	Camila Santander
Chillán Viejo	Sol Vargas Sepulveda
Concepción	Catalina Vargas
La Florida	Nicole Ebner
Pucón	Abi Copaiba
Puerto Montt	Muriel Berner
Quillota	Konstanza Schmidt
Talca	Tamara Digenova
Valdivia	Michelle Chávez
