= Suomen Neito =

Finnish beauty contest

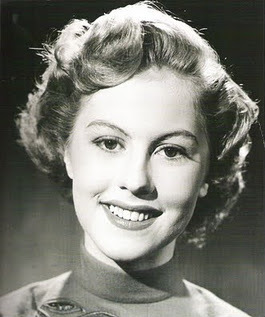
Armi Kuusela, the first Suomen Neito

Suomen Neito (English: Maiden of Finland) was a traditional Finnish beauty pageant held in the 1950s, 1960s, 1986, and from 1990 to 2007. The pageant began in 1952 when Armi Kuusela was crowned as the first Suomen Neito, which qualified her for the inaugural Miss Universe pageant, where she became its first titleholder. From 1986 to 2006, Suomen Neito winners represented Finland in the Miss World pageant. However, in 2007, the pageant's significance diminished with the introduction of a new selection process, leading to its disbandment.

In 1962 and 1991, the Suomen Neito pageants were held concurrently with the Miss Finland pageant. Miss Finland (Finnish: Miss Suomi), established in 1931, is the oldest and most prominent beauty pageant in Finland.

== Titleholders ==
Year	Winner	Notes
1952	Armi Kuusela	Subsequently Miss Universe 1952
1953	Teija Sopanen	
1954	Lenita Airisto	
1955	Sirkku Talja	
1962	Aulikki Järvinen	2nd runner-up at Miss Universe 1962
1963	Nadine Gustafsson	
1986	Satu-Riitta Alaharja	
1990	Nina Björkfelt	
1991	Nina Autio	
1992	Petra von Hellens	
1993	Janina Frostell	
1994	Mia Forsell	
1995	Terhi Koivisto	
1996	Hanna Hirvonen	
1997	Minna Lehtinen	
1998	Maaret Nousiainen	
1999	Maria Laamanen	
2000	Salima Peippo	
2001	Jenni Hietanen	
2002	Hanne Hynynen	
2003	Johanna Hynninen	
2004	Niina Tikanmäki	
2005	Saana Anttila	
2006	Jenniina Tuokko	
2007	Essi Hellstén	

== See also ==
- Miss Finland
