= Armi Kuusela =

Finnish-American beauty queen and philanthropist (born 1934)

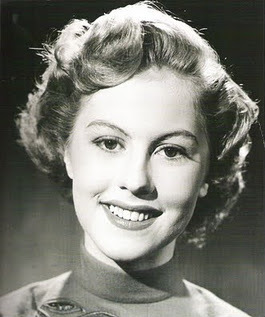
- Kuusela in 1952
- Born: Armi Helena Kuusela; 20 August 1934 (age 92); Muhos, Finland
- Height: 1.65 m (5 ft 5 in)
- Spouses: Virgilio Hilario (m. 1953; died 1975); Albert N. Williams (m. 1978)
- Children: 5
- Beauty pageant titleholder
- Title: Suomen Neito 1952; Miss Universe 1952 (Relinquished)
- Hair color: Blonde
- Eye color: Blue
- Major competitions: Suomen Neito 1952; (Winner); Miss Universe 1952; (Winner; Relinquished) (Note: Kuusela relinquished her title as Miss Universe 1952 shortly before her reign was scheduled to end to marry Filipino businessman, Virgilio Hilario, on May 4, 1953. Despite this, her resignation was not made official by the Miss Universe Organization.)

Armi Helena Kuusela-Williams (née Kuusela, formerly Kuusela-Hilario; born 20 August 1934) is a Finnish-American beauty queen and philanthropist, best known for being the first-ever Miss Universe. In 1952, she gained national recognition by winning the Finnish beauty contest, Suomen Neito, which qualified her to represent Finland in the inaugural Miss Universe pageant held in Long Beach, California. Following her historic win, Kuusela dedicated her life to philanthropy, business, and cultural ambassadorship. Through the years, she became actively involved in numerous charitable organizations and was honored for her contributions to various causes.

== Early life ==
Armi Helena Kuusela was one of six children born to Finnish parents who owned and operated a small family business, except when her father, a decorated veteran, fought for Finland during World War II. She attended elementary and middle school in Muhos and the Porvoon Naisopisto boarding school in Porvoo, Finland.

Kuusela was unexpectedly invited to participate in Finland's national beauty pageant after the mother of her boarding school roommate responded to a public notice seeking the ideal representative for Suomen Neito (translated as Maiden of Finland). On May 24, 1952, Kuusela won the national title, which qualified her to compete in the inaugural Miss Universe competition. This also elevated her to the status of a goodwill ambassador for Finland. Her prizes included a round-trip ticket on Pan American Airlines to attend the event in Long Beach, California.

== Miss Universe ==
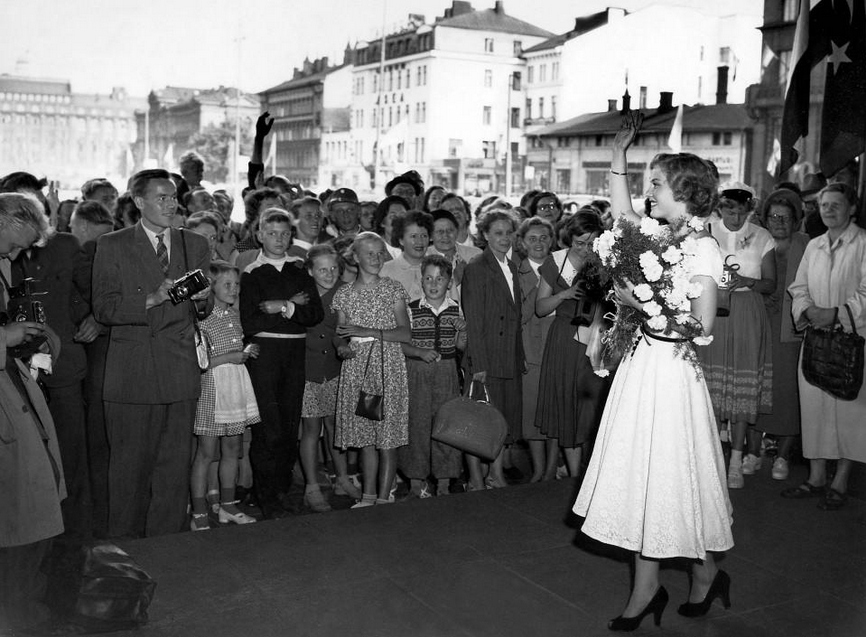
Miss Universe Armi Kuusela greets people in front of Hotel Vaakuna in Helsinki, Finland, 1952.

On 17 June 1952, chaperoned by her older sister, Kuusela took the Pan Am flight from Helsinki to Long Beach, California, where she took part in the first Miss Universe pageant. Thirty contestants participated in the event, held on 28 June 1952. Kuusela, as Suomen Neito, captured the first Miss Universe crown. At her crowning, she was only 17 years old, weighed 49 kg (108 lb), and her height was 1.65 m (5 ft 5 in).

Among her many prizes, Kuusela received a new car and a long-term movie contract from Universal Studios. As titleholder, she also became a Goodwill Ambassador for the Miss Universe organization.

Kuusela was the only Miss Universe to be crowned with the Romanov Imperial Nuptial Crown. The crown was previously owned by the Russian monarchy.

That year, Kuusela also starred in a Finnish movie about her titled Maailman kaunein tyttö (The Most Beautiful Girl in the World). Tauno Palo played the role of Jack Coleman, Veikko Itkonen was the director, and Mika Waltari received writing credits for the film.

== Life after Miss Universe ==
At the request of the Finnish government shortly after winning the Miss Universe title, Kuusela attended the Summer Olympics held in Helsinki that year. While attending there, the Philippine trade delegation invited her to attend their first International Trade Exposition. On 22 February 1953, Kuusela embarked upon a world tour, again with her older sister as chaperone. She attended the Philippines Exposition and crowned Miss Philippines. While there, she met businessman, developer, and hotelier Virgilio Hilario at a dance in Baguio, a hill station 260 km north of Manila that served as the nation's summer capital. When Kuusela and her sister continued on their tour to Japan, Hilario followed to pursue her. After a whirlwind courtship, Kuusela chose to relinquish her crown shortly before her reign ended as Miss Universe, and married Hilario on 4 May 1953 in Tokyo. They honeymooned in Hawai‘i, then toured the United States and Europe, before settling in Manila.

Kuusela and Hilario owned and operated Gilarmi Corporation, a real estate development company in Makati, which included their eponymous Gilarmi Hotel along Ayala Avenue, the first residential hotel in the Philippine which had also an sauna. Between 1955 and 1965, they had five children: Arne, Anna-Lisa, José (Jussi), Eva-Maria and Miguel (Mikko). Hilario died of a heart attack on 7 September 1975, and until 1979, Kuusela was chief executive officer of Gilarmi Corporation and Honorary Counsel of Finland in Manila.

Kuusela was married a second time to American diplomat Albert N. Williams, a Senior Officer with the United States Department of State on 8 June 1978. Kuusela supported Williams in his subsequent appointment as American Consul General in Barcelona, Spain, where they resided from 1979 to 1983. Williams was recalled to Washington, D.C., where they underwent Turkish language training from 1983 to 1985, and then she supported him in his appointment as American Consul General in İzmir, Turkey, where they stayed from 1985 to 1989. Upon retirement in 1989, they settled in La Jolla, a community in San Diego, California. In 1996, Kuusela became a naturalised United States citizen. By then, she had traveled the world, lived in many countries, and spoke seven languages: Finnish, English, Swedish, German, Tagalog, Spanish, and Turkish.

Since retirement, Kuusela has worked on many charitable causes. Since 1992, she has been a Member of the Director's Circle of the San Diego Museum of Art and the Chancellor's Associates at the University of California, San Diego. From 1993 to 1998, she was a Member of the Director's Circle of the Mingei International Museum, and co-chair of the Director's Circle from 1993 to 1994. From 1993 to 2006, she served as board member of the Burnham Cancer Research Institute (now known as the Sanford Burnham Preys Institute), and a Member of its Board Nominating Committee. Since then, she has served as a Member of the advisory board of the Fishman Foundation, an affiliate of the Institute that funds research scholarship. Since 1994, she has been a Bravissimo Circle Paton of the San Diego Opera. Since 1995, she has been a Charter Member of the Patrons of the Prado, for the benefit of San Diego's iconic Balboa Park museums. In 2010, she became a Member of the International Bipolar Foundation. That year, she also became a Member of the Angel's Angels of the San Diego Youth Symphony and Conservatory, and from 2013 to 2018, she served as honorary co-chair of its annual gala to raise scholarships for the children. In 2014, she was admitted into the Order of Saint John, a British order of chivalry, first as a Member and later promoted to the rank of Officer in 2018.

Kuusela has received numerous honors for her charity. In 2000, she received the Deming Award from the Burnham Cancer Research Institute and the Paul Harris Award for Philanthropy from the International Rotary Foundation. In 2008, she received the Fishman Foundation Award. In 2011, the City of San Diego designated August 10, 2011, as Armi Kuusela Williams Day, by Proclamation of Mayor Jerry Sanders. In 2012, the President of Finland awarded Kuusela the Order of the White Rose of Finland, with the rank of Knight (First Class).

She visited her native town of Muhos in August 2014. Her visit was an official meeting with the city municipal manager.

== Notes ==
Awards and achievements
New title	Miss Universe; 1952 (Relinquished)	Succeeded by (France) Christiane Martel
