= Ignacia Fernández =

Chilean singer, model, and beauty pageant titleholder

- Fernández in 2021
- Born: María Ignacia Fernández Salas; May 23, 1998 (age 28); Santiago, Chile
- Occupations: Model; singer; musician
- Height: 1.70 m (5 ft 7 in)
- Beauty pageant titleholder
- Title: Miss World Chile 2025
- Major competitions: Miss Universe Chile 2024; (4th Runner-Up); Miss World Chile 2025; (Winner); Miss World 2026; (Unplaced)

María Ignacia Fernández Salas (born 23 May 1998) is a Chilean model, singer, and beauty pageant titleholder who was crowned Miss World Chile 2025, and had represented her country at the Miss World 2026 pageant. She is the founder and lead vocalist of the progressive death metal band Decessus.

== Early life and music career ==
Fernández was born and raised in Santiago, Chile. She began working as a fashion model in her late teens, appearing in commercial campaigns and fashion shows across Latin America.

In 2020, Fernández formed the melodic and progressive death metal band Decessus, serving as its primary founder and lead vocalist. Self-taught in extreme vocal techniques, she later underwent formal training in vocal health and phoniatrics to perform death growls safely. Decessus released several singles including "Deliverance" (2020), "Dying Hope Blossoms" (2022), "My War of Pain" (2023), and "Dark Flames" (2025), and performed as an opening act for international metal groups such as Epica, Insomnium, and Jinjer.

In 2026, Fernández was featured as a guest vocalist on "Ashen World" and "Sanctuary", two tracks from Dark Asylum, the fourteenth studio album by American power metal band Kamelot.

== Pageantry ==
=== Miss Universe Chile 2024 ===
Fernández made her beauty pageant debut in 2024 when she competed in Miss Universe Chile 2024 representing the Los Dominicos district, where she placed as the fourth runner-up.

=== Miss World Chile 2025 ===
In late 2025, Fernández entered the Miss World Chile contest representing the Las Condes municipality. During the semifinal talent round broadcast live on Chilevisión, she delivered an extreme metal vocal performance of an original Decessus track alongside guitarist Carlos Palma. The video of her performance quickly went viral on social media, drawing international media coverage and praise from music figures such as Amy Lee, Ellie Goulding, and Rosalía.

On 9 November 2025, Fernández defeated 19 other finalists and was crowned Miss World Chile 2025 by outgoing titleholder Francisca Lavandero.

=== Miss World 2026 ===
As Miss World Chile 2025, Fernández earned the right to represent Chile at the Miss World 2026 competition.

== Discography ==
=== Singles with Decessus ===
- "Deliverance" (2020)
- "Dying Hope Blossoms" (2022)
- "My War of Pain" (2023)
- "Dark Flames" (2025)

Awards and achievements
Preceded by Francisca Lavandero	Miss World Chile; 2025	Incumbent
