= Sofia Depassier =

Chilean beauty pageant titleholder

- Born: Santiago, Chile
- Beauty pageant titleholder
- Title: Miss Universe Chile 2022; Miss Charm Chile 2024
- Major competitions: Miss Teen South Florida 2014 (1st Runner Up); Miss Universe Chile 2020 (1st Runner Up); Miss Universe Chile 2022 (Winner); Miss Universe 2022 (Unplaced); Miss Charm 2024 (Withdrew)

Sofía Depassier is a Chilean beauty pageant titleholder who won Miss Universe Chile 2022 and she represented Chile at the Miss Universe 2022. She was set to represent Chile at Miss Charm 2024 but later withdrew.

== Pageantry ==
=== Miss Universe Chile 2022 ===
Depassier entered and won Miss Universe Chile 2022. She was crowned by her predecessor Figueroa.

=== Miss Universe 2022 ===
She represented Chile at the Miss Universe 2022, and did not reach the top 16. She won the Miss Congeniality award.

=== Miss Charm Chile 2024 ===
Depassier won Miss Charm Chile and was to represent Chile at Miss Charm 2024 but later withdrew.

Awards and achievements
Preceded by Antonia Figueroa Alvarado	Miss Universe Chile; 2022	Succeeded by Celeste Viel
Preceded by Anahí Hormazabal Garay	Miss Charm Chile; 2024	Succeeded by Incumbent
Preceded by Poland Olga Buława	Miss Congeniality - Miss Universe; 2022	Succeeded by Spain Athenea Pérez
