= Celeste Viel =

Chilean model and beauty pageant titleholder

- Born: Celeste Viel Caballero; 21 October 1999 (age 26); Miami, Florida, U.S.
- Height: 1.76 m (5 ft 9 in)
- Beauty pageant titleholder
- Title: Miss Universe Chile 2023
- Hair color: Brown
- Eye color: Hazel
- Major competitions: Miss Universo Chile 2023; (Winner); Miss Universe 2023; (Top 20)

Celeste Viel Caballero (born 21 October 1999) is a Chilean model and beauty pageant titleholder who won Miss Universe Chile 2023. Her mother, Paula Caballero also won the title in 1993. She represented Chile at the Miss Universe 2023 pageant and finished as a Top 20 semifinalist, placing for the first time since 2004.

== Personal life ==
Viel is a public relations student at Florida International University in Miami.

== Pageantry ==
=== Miss Universe Chile 2023 ===
During the competition's final coronation night on 13 August 2023, Viel was crowned Miss Universe Chile 2023. She competed at Miss Universe 2023.

=== Miss Universe 2023 ===
Viel represented Chile at the Miss Universe 2023 pageant on November 18, 2023, in El Salvador. Viel concluded her Miss Universe journey by finishing as a Top 20 semifinalist, also making the country place for the first time since 2004.

Awards and achievements
Preceded by Sofia Depassier	Miss Universe Chile; 2023	Succeeded by Emilia Dides
