= Catalina Cáceres =

Chilean model and beauty queen (born 1990)

Catalina Paz Cáceres Ríos
- Born: May 16, 1990 (age 36); Santiago, Chile
- Height: 1.75 m (5 ft 9 in)
- Beauty pageant titleholder
- Title: Nuestra Belleza Chile 2014; Miss Universo Chile 2016
- Hair color: Brown
- Eye color: Brown
- Major competitions: Nuestra Belleza Chile 2014 (Winner); Miss Universo Chile 2016 (Winner); Miss Earth 2014 (Unplaced); Miss Universe 2016 (Unplaced)

Catalina Paz Cáceres Ríos (born May 16, 1990), simply known as Catalina Cáceres, is a Chilean model and beauty pageant titleholder who was crowned Nuestra Belleza Chile and Miss Universo Chile in 2016. She represented Chile at the Miss Universe 2016 pageant.

== Personal life ==
Cáceres is an interior designer and was raised in Huechuraba. Her father is an engineer and her mother an artist.

Cáceres volunteers for Alzheimer Chilean Corporation and supports LGBT rights. Her "politically incorrect" answer after being asked about LGBT adoption and marriage rights during Miss Universo Chile made international headline news.

== Pageantry ==
=== Nuestra Belleza Chile 2014 ===
Catalina won the Nuestra Belleza Chile title in 2014, succeeding the previous winner Natalia Lermanda. She bested 21 other finalists in the said pageant. As part of her responsibilities, Catalina attended the "Green Fair" event, held at Mapocho Station on September 7, 2014.

=== Miss Earth 2014 ===
After winning Miss Earth Chile, Catalina flew to the Philippines in November to compete with nearly 100 other candidates to be Alyz Henrich's successor as Miss Earth. However, she failed to place. Miss Earth 2014 was won by Jamie Herrell of the Philippines.

=== Miss Universo Chile 2016 ===
She was crowned as Miss Universo Chile 2016, making her Chile's representative for the Miss Universe 2016 pageant in the Philippines.

=== Miss Universe 2016 ===
As Miss Universo Chile, she competed at the Miss Universe 2016 pageant but was ultimately unplaced.

Awards and achievements
Preceded by Natalia Lermanda	Miss Earth Chile; 2014	Succeeded by Natividad Leiva
Preceded by María Belén Jerez Spuler	Miss Universo Chile; 2016	Succeeded by Natividad Leiva
