= Chicureo =

City in the Santiago Metropolitan Region, Chile

Coordinates: 33°17′S 70°38′W

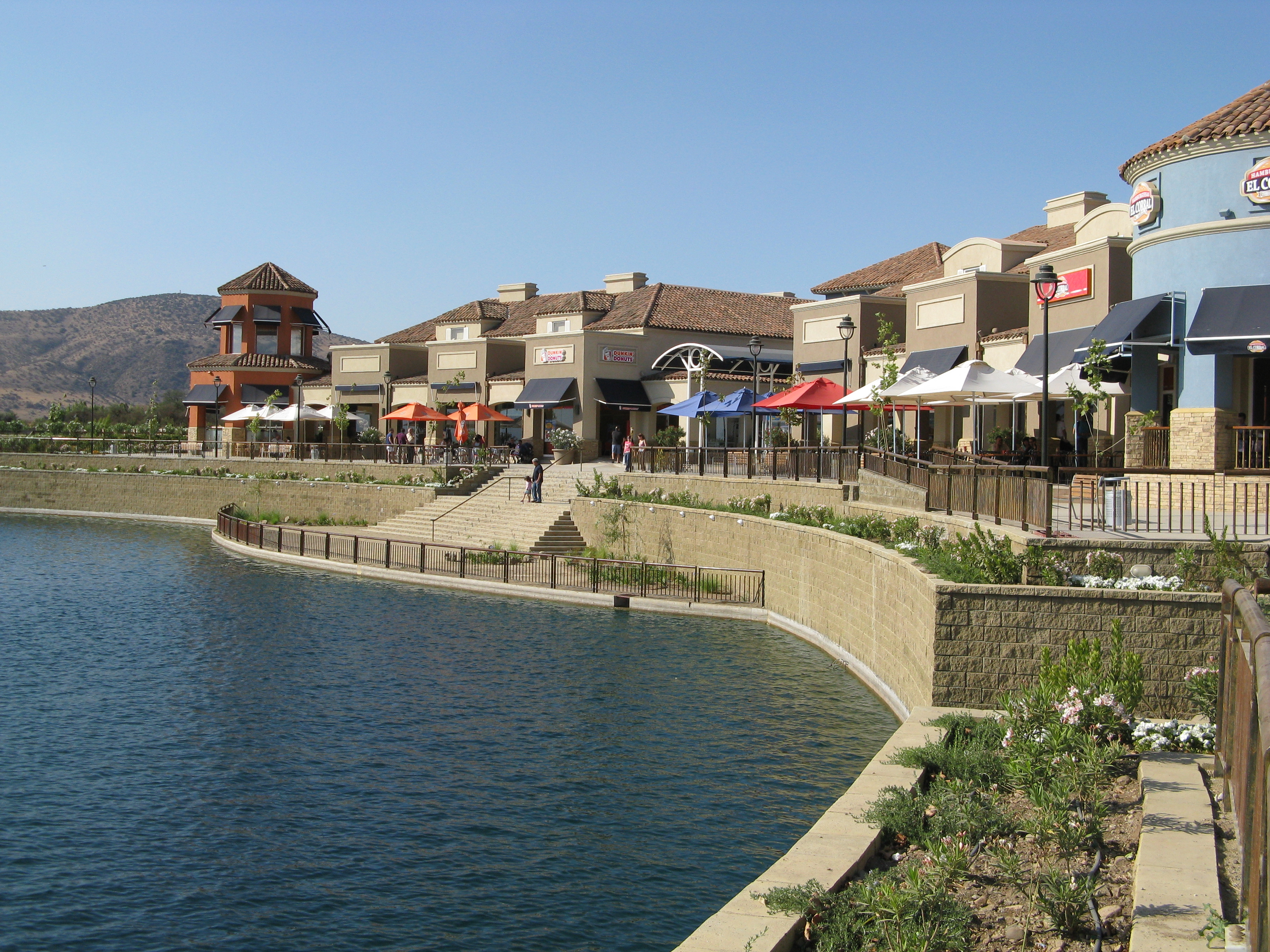
View of the Piedra Roja Lagoon in Chicureo.

Chicureo (from Mapudungun chikümn rewe 'place where lances are set up') is a city located in Colina, an urban-suburban commune of Chile, Chacabuco Province, Santiago Metropolitan Region. In 2017 it had a population of 10,975 inhabitants.

Predominantly an agricultural area, Chicureo is home to several haciendas. As part of its history, Chicureo's 100-year-old northeast zone manor house, Hacienda Guay-Guay, is preserved intact.
