= Geraldine González (model) =

Chilean model and beauty queen

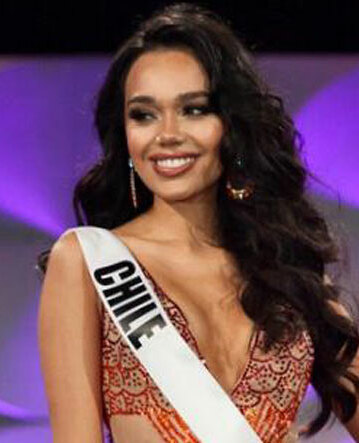
- Born: Geraldine González Martínez
- Beauty pageant titleholder
- Title: Miss Universo Chile 2019
- Hair color: Black
- Eye color: Brown
- Major competitions: Miss Universo Chile 2018 (2nd Runner-up); Miss Universo Chile 2019 (Winner); Miss Universe 2019 (Unplaced)

Geraldine González Martínez is a Chilean model and beauty pageant titleholder who was crowned Miss Universo Chile 2019. González represented Chile in Miss Universe 2019 but was unplaced.

== Pageantry ==
=== Miss Universo Chile ===
González competed in the 2018 edition of Miss Universo Chile where she was placed as the second runner-up behind Andrea Díaz. At her second attempt, she won the title of Miss Universe Chile 2019 representing Escuella SuperMiss on September 1, 2019 at the Casino Dreams in Punta Arenas, Región de Magallanes y de la Antártica Chilena, Chile.

=== Miss Universe 2019 ===
She represented Chile at the Miss Universe 2019 competition, held at Tyler Perry Studios in Atlanta, Georgia, United States on December 8. González failed to enter the Top 20.

Awards and achievements
Preceded by Andrea Díaz	Miss Universo Chile; 2019	Succeeded by Daniela Nicolás
