= Emilia Dides =

Chilean singer and beauty pageant titleholder

- Dides at the 2026 Latin Grammy Awards
- Born: Emilia Ignacia Dides Maffei; 29 June 1999 (age 27); Vitacura, Santiago, Chile
- Height: 1.76 m (5 ft 9 in)
- Beauty pageant titleholder
- Title: Miss Universe Chile 2024
- Major competitions: Miss Universe Chile 2024; (Winner); Miss Universe 2024; (Top 12); (People's Choice Award)

Emilia Ignacia Dides Maffei (born June 29, 1999), also known by her stage name Emi D, is a Chilean singer, model and beauty pageant titleholder who was crowned Miss Universe Chile 2024. She represented Chile at the Miss Universe 2024 pageant, where she placed in the Top 12 semifinalists and won the People's Choice Award, marking Chile's strongest showing in the competition in over three decades.

== Early life and education ==
Emilia Dides was born and raised in the upscale commune of Vitacura in Santiago. She comes from a multicultural background, with both Lebanese and Italian heritage. Her mother, Joanna Maffei, is a professional soprano, while her father is Javier Dides.

Dides developed a passion for music at the age of seven. During her teenage years, she faced significant challenges with depression and underwent professional treatment.

She initially pursued vocal studies at the Universidad Mayor but put her degree on hold to focus on her entertainment career. Dides also trained at the Escuela Moderna de Música and the Academia de Alicia Puccio before earning a scholarship to study at the Jackie Arredondo Music World in Miami, Florida.

== Career ==
=== Music ===
Dides first gained national recognition in 2018 when she won the second season of the television talent competition Rojo, el color del talento ("Red, the Color of Talent"). She further established her television presence by competing in the second season of the imitation show The Covers on Mega (2021-2022), where she finished as runner-up.

Working under the stage name "Emi D," she has built a recording career with several single releases including "Talón de aquiles" (2022), "Ya no quiero verte" (2022), "Hay peligro" (2023), "Quiéreme bien" (2023), "Inevitable" (2023), and "Alter Ego" (2024).

=== Beauty pageants ===
==== Miss Universe Chile 2024 ====
In 2024, Dides entered the national beauty pageant circuit as the representative of Vitacura in the Miss Universe Chile 2024 competition. During the coronation ceremony on July 7, 2024, she was awarded the title of Miss Universe Chile 2024, earning the right to represent her country internationally.

==== Miss Universe 2024 ====
Dides represented Chile at the Miss Universe 2024 pageant held on November 16, 2024, in Mexico City. Her performance earned her a place among the Top 12 semifinalists, and she additionally received the People's Choice Award. This achievement represented Chile's most successful placement in the Miss Universe competition since the 1990s, breaking a long-standing drought for the South American nation.

=== Television and public appearances ===
In February 2025, Dides served as a jury member for the LXIV Festival Internacional de la Canción de Viña del Mar, Latin America's most prestigious music festival, where she was also crowned Queen of the festival. She is scheduled to co-host the Miss Universe Chile 2025 pageant alongside television personality Martín Cárcamo.

== Personal life ==
Dides was previously in a relationship with fellow Chilean singer Toarii Valantín, which ended in 2024. She is currently in a relationship with former American football player and Chilean basketball representative Sammis Reyes, which was publicly confirmed during the 2025 Viña del Mar Festival.

== Discography ==
=== Singles ===
- "Talón de aquiles" (2022)
- "Ya no quiero verte" (2022)
- "Hay peligro" (2023)
- "Quiéreme bien" (2023)
- "Inevitable" (2023)
- "Alter Ego" (2024)

== Filmography ==
Year	Show	Role	Notes
2018–2019	Rojo, el color del talento	Contestant	Winner (Season 2)
2022	The Covers	Contestant	2nd Place (Season 2)
2024	Miss Universe Chile 2024	Contestant (Representative of Vitacura)	Winner
2024	Miss Universe 2024	Contestant (Representative of Chile)	Top 12 Semifinalist, People's Choice Award
2025	LXIV Festival Internacional de la Canción de Viña del Mar	Jury Member	Queen of the Festival
2025	Miss Universe Chile 2025	Co-host	With Martín Cárcamo

Awards and achievements
Preceded by Celeste Viel	Miss Universe Chile; 2024	Succeeded by Inna Moll
Preceded by (Philippines) Michelle Dee	Fan Vote Winner Miss Universe; 2024	Succeeded by (Paraguay) Yanina Gómez
