= Miss Universe Chile =

Beauty contest

- Type: Beauty pageant
- Headquarters: Santiago, Chile
- Current titleholder: Inna Moll; Vitacura
- President: Keno Manzur
- National Director: Luciano Marocchino (2004 — 2015); Keno Manzur (2019 — Present)
- Language: Spanish
- Website: Miss Universo Chile Official Website

Miss Universe Chile (abbreviated as MUCH; Spanish: Miss Universo Chile) is an annual national beauty pageant that selects Chile's official representative to Miss Universe—one of the Big Four beauty pageants.

The current Miss Universo Chile is Dominga López of Viña del Mar, who was crowned in August 2026.

== History ==
Between 1969 and 1995, Paula magazine was responsible for organizing the contest and maintaining the franchise; during this period, TVN broadcast the competition beginning in 1976. Between 1991 and 1994, Paula magazine and Canal 13 jointly selected Miss Chile for Miss Universe and Miss World. Subsequently, a partnership between Caras magazine and Megavisión maintained the franchise in 1996 and 1997. Canal 13 broadcast the pageant uninterruptedly from 1998 to 2002.

Luciano Marocchino had the Chilean franchise for Miss Universe since 2004, but due to financial questions chose to not send a delegate during the 2007-2010 period. In 2011, Chile returned to the competition with Vanessa Ceruti. Marocchino's organization received much criticism, for not ensuring adequate preparation to the winners. He gave up the contest in 2015.

The national broadcaster, Chilevisión held the contest from 2016 up to 2018.

In 2019, Keno Manzur took over the Miss Universe franchise in Chile as National Director.

Chile placed 14 times in the semi-finals, with one Miss Universe winner Cecilia Bolocco in 1987.

== Titleholders ==
- : Declared as Winner
- : Ended as a runner-up or Top 5/6 finalist
- : Ended as a finalists or semifinalists
- : Ended as a Special Award winner

The winner of Miss Chile represents her country at the Miss Universe. On occasion, when the winner does not qualify (due to age) a runner-up is sent.

Year	Represented	Miss Chile	Placement at Miss Universe	Special Award(s)
2026	Viña del Mar	Dominga López	TBA	
2025	Vitacura	María Ignacia Moll Bilbao	Top 12	
2024	Vitacura	Emilia Dides Maffei	Top 12	People's Choice Award; Best National Costume (2nd Place)
2023	Chilean Community in USA	Celeste Viel Caballero	Top 20	Voice For Change (Top 10)
2022	Chilean Community in USA	Sofía Depassier Sepúlveda	Unplaced	Miss Congeniality
2021	Coquimbo	Antonia Figueroa Alvarado	Unplaced	Social Impact Award
2020	Copiapo	Daniela Nicolás Gómez	Unplaced	
2019	Escuela Supermiss	Geraldine González Martínez	Unplaced	
2018	Santiago	Andrea Díaz Nicolás	Unplaced	
2017	Santiago	Natividad Leiva Bello	Unplaced	
2016	Huechuraba	Catalina Cáceres Ríos	Unplaced	
2015	Valparaiso	Belén Jerez Spuler	Unplaced	
2014	O'Higgins	Hellen Toncio Salazar	Unplaced	
2013	Tarapaca	María Jesús Matthei Molina	Unplaced	
2012	O'Higgins	Ana Luisa König Browne	Unplaced	
2011	Magallanes	Vanessa Ceruti Vásquez	Unplaced	
Did not compete between 2007—2010
2006	Coquimbo	Belén Montilla Torreblanca	Unplaced	
2005	Santiago	Renata Ruiz Pérez	Unplaced	
2004	Valparaíso	Gabriela Barros Tapia	Top 15	
2003	Did not compete			
2002	Santiago	Nicole Rencoret Ladrón de Guevara	Unplaced	
2001	Santiago	Carolina Gámez Gallardo	Unplaced	
2000	Valparaíso	Francesca Sovino Parra	Unplaced	
1999	Santiago	Andrea Muñoz Sessarego	Unplaced	
1998	Magallanes	Claudia Arnello Reynolds	Unplaced	
1997	Tarapacá	Claudia Delpín Corssen	Unplaced	
1997	Rapa Nui	Hetu'u Rapu Atan	Disqualified. The first runner-up took over.	
1996	Santiago	Andrea L'Huillier Troncoso	Unplaced	
1995	Magallanes	Paola Falcone Bacigalupo	Unplaced	
1994	Santiago	Constanza Barbieri Sanz	Unplaced	
1993	Santiago	Savka Pollak Tomasevic	Unplaced	
1992	Santiago	Marcela Vacarezza Etcheverry	Unplaced	
1991	Araucanía	Cecilia Alfaro Navarrete	Unplaced	
1990	Antofagasta	Uranía Haltenhoff Nikiforos	Top 6	
1989	Magallanes	Macarena Mina Garachena	Top 10	
1988	Valparaíso	Verónica Romero Carvajal	Unplaced	
1987	Santiago	Cecilia Bolocco Fonck	Miss Universe 1987	
1986	Santiago	Mariana Villasante Aravena	Top 10	Best National Costume (3rd Place)
1985	O'Higgins	Claudia van Sint Jan del Pedregal	Top 10	
1984	Valparaíso	Carol Bähnke Muñoz	Unplaced	
1983	Santiago	Josefa Isensee Ugarte	Unplaced	
1982	Santiago	Jenny Purto Arab	Unplaced	
1981	Valparaíso	Soledad Hurtado Arellano	Unplaced	
1980	Valparaíso	Gabriela Campusano Puelma	Unplaced	
1979	Maule	Cecilia Serrano Gildemeister	Unplaced	
1978	Santiago	Mary Anne Müller Prieto	Top 12	
1977	Santiago	Priscilla Brenner Conrad	Unplaced	
1976	Los Lagos	Verónica Sommer Mayer	Top 12	
1975	Santiago	Raquel Argandoña de la Fuente	Unplaced	
1974	Santiago	Rebeca González Ramírez	Unplaced	
1973	Atacama	Wendy Robertson Cleary	Unplaced	Miss Congeniality
1972	Santiago	Consuelo Fernández de Olivares	Unplaced	
1971	Did not compete			
1970	Santiago	Soledad Errázuriz García-Moreno	Unplaced	
1969	Santiago	Mónica Larson Teuber	Top 15	
1968	Santiago	Dánae Sala Sarradell	Top 15	
1967	Antofagasta	Ingrid Vila Riveros	Unplaced	
1966	Bío Bío	Stella Dunnage Roberts	Unplaced	
1965	Did not compete			
1964	Valparaíso	Patricia Herrera Cigna	Unplaced	
Did not compete between 1962—1963
1961	Magallanes	Gloria Silva Escobar†	Top 15	
1960	Santiago	Marinka Pohlhammer Espinoza	Unplaced	
1959	Did not compete			
1958	Valparaíso	Raquel Molina Urrutia	Top 15	
1957	Did not compete			
1956	Santiago	Concepción Obach Chacana	Unplaced	
1955	Antofagasta	Rosita Merello Catalán Sidgman	Unplaced	
1954	Antofagasta	Gloria Leguisos Mesina	Top 16	
1953	Did not compete			
1952	Santiago	Esther Saavedra Yoacham†	Unplaced	Most Popular Girl

=== Winners by locality ===
Localities	Titles	Winning Years
Santiago	25	1952, 1956, 1960, 1968, 1969, 1970, 1972, 1974, 1975, 1977, 1978, 1982, 1983, 1986, 1987, 1992, 1993, 1994, 1996, 1999, 2001, 2002, 2005, 2017, 2018
Valparaiso	9	1958, 1964, 1980, 1981, 1984, 1988, 2000, 2004, 2015
Antofagasta	4	1954, 1955, 1967, 1990
Magallanes	4	1961, 1995, 1998, 2011
O'Higgins	3	1985, 2012, 2014
Vitacura	2	2024, 2025
Chilean Community in USA	2	2022, 2023
Coquimbo	2	2006, 2021
Tarapacá	2	1997, 2013
Viña del Mar	1	2026
Copiapo	1	2020
Escuela Supermiss	1	2019
Huechuraba	1	2016
Rapa Nui	1	1997
Araucanía	1	1991
Aysén	1	1989
Los Lagos	1	1976
Maule	1	1974
Atacama	1	1973
Bío Bío	1	1966

== See also ==
- Miss World Chile
- Mister Chile
