= La Reina =

Commune in Santiago, Chile

- Commune
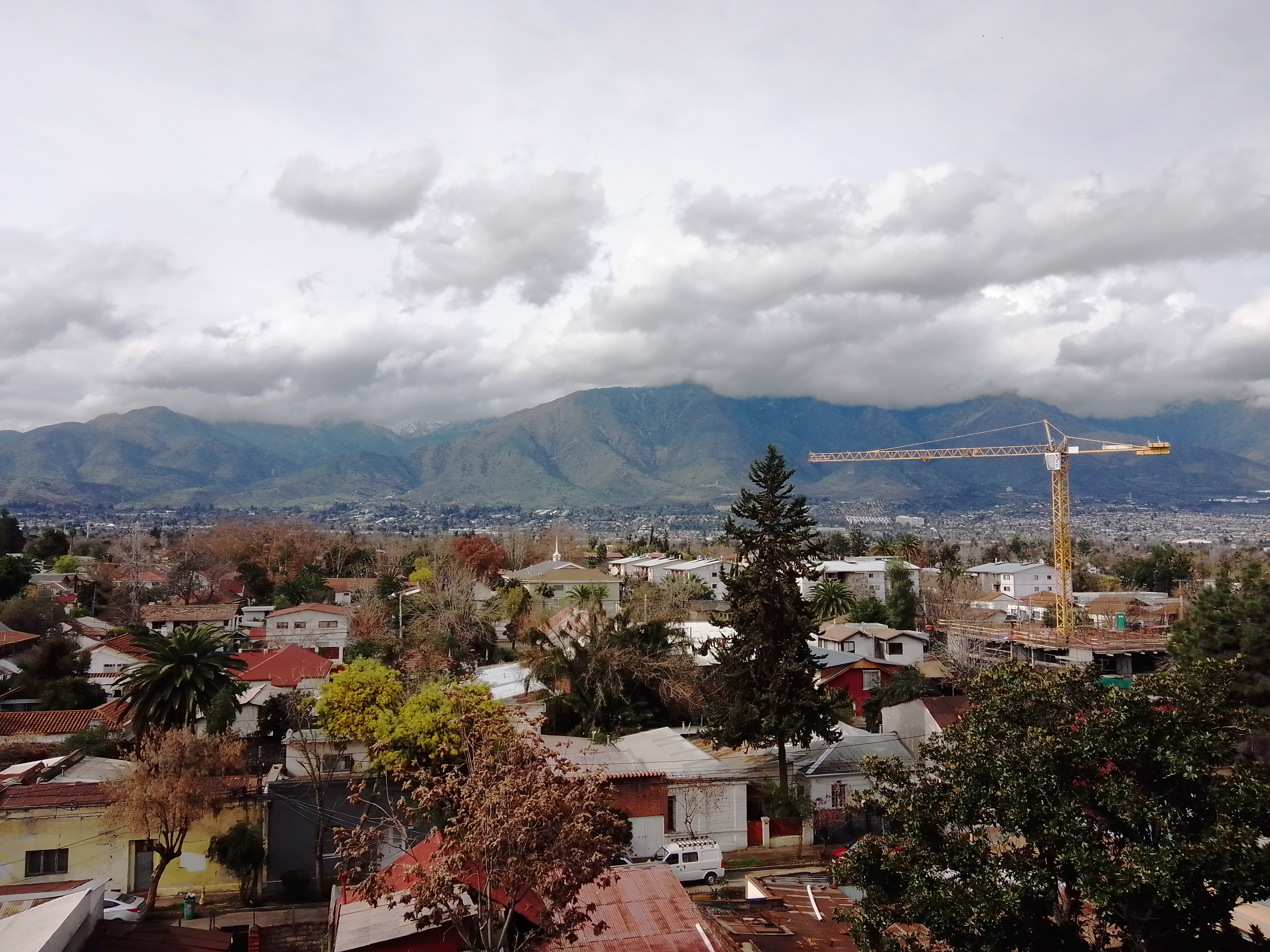
- View from the Mall Plaza Egaña to the east

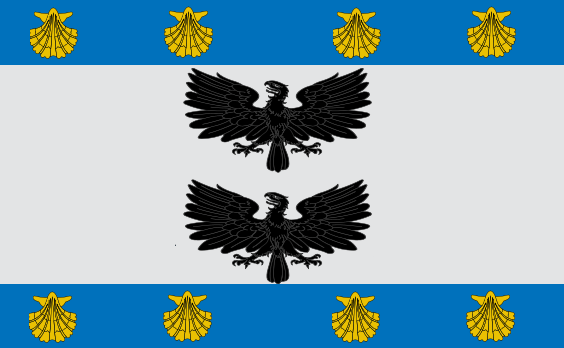
- Flag Coat of arms La Reina within Greater Santiago Location in Chile
- Coordinates: 33°27′S 70°33′W
- Country: Chile
- Region: Santiago Metropolitan
- Province: Santiago
- Established: 1 July 1963

Government
  - Type: Municipality
  - Mayor: José Manuel Palacios (UDI)

Area
  - Total: 23.4 km^{2} (9.0 sq mi)

Population (2024)
  - Total: 89,870
  - Density: 3,840/km^{2} (9,950/sq mi)
  - Urban: 89,870
  - Rural: 0
- Time zone: UTC-4 (CLT)
- Area code: 56 +
- Website: www.lareina.cl

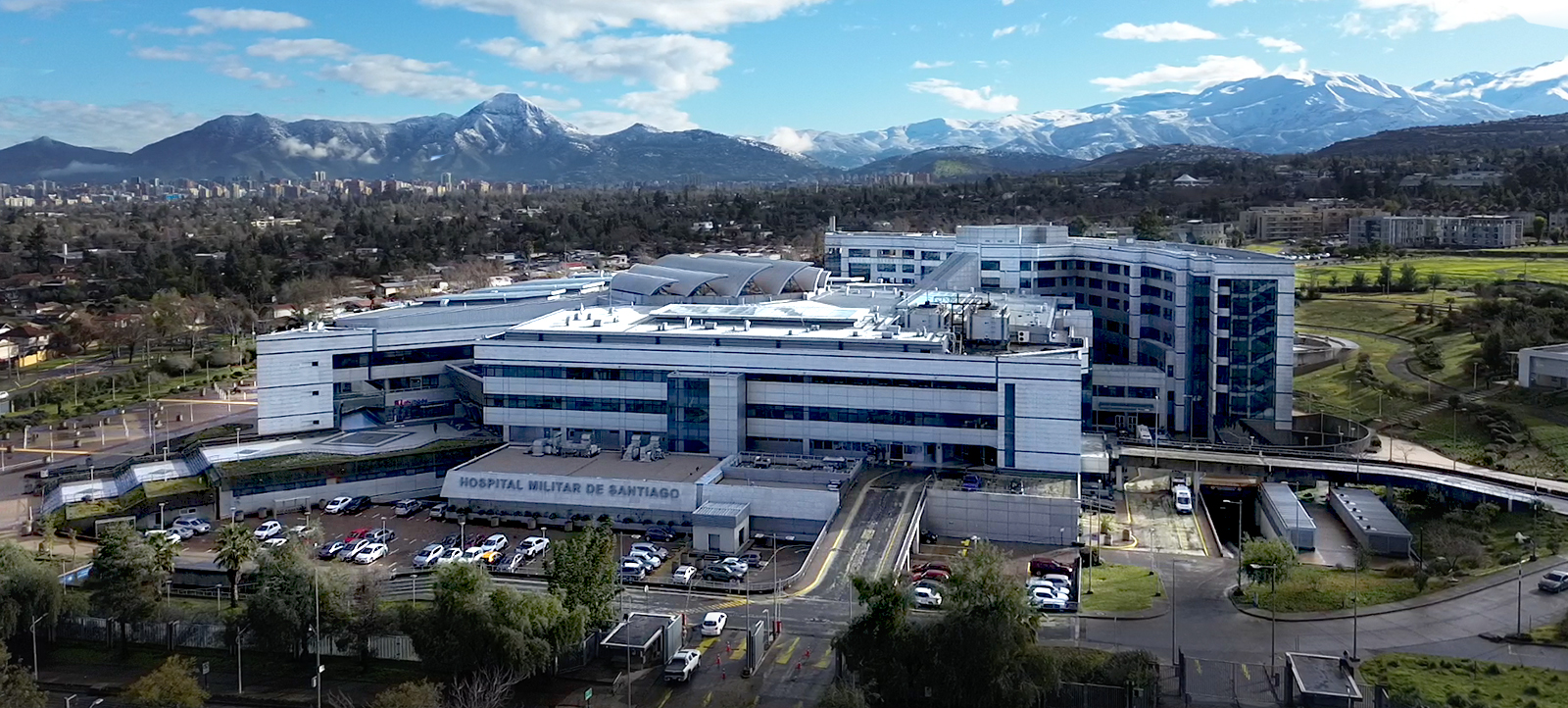
Hospital Militar de Santiago

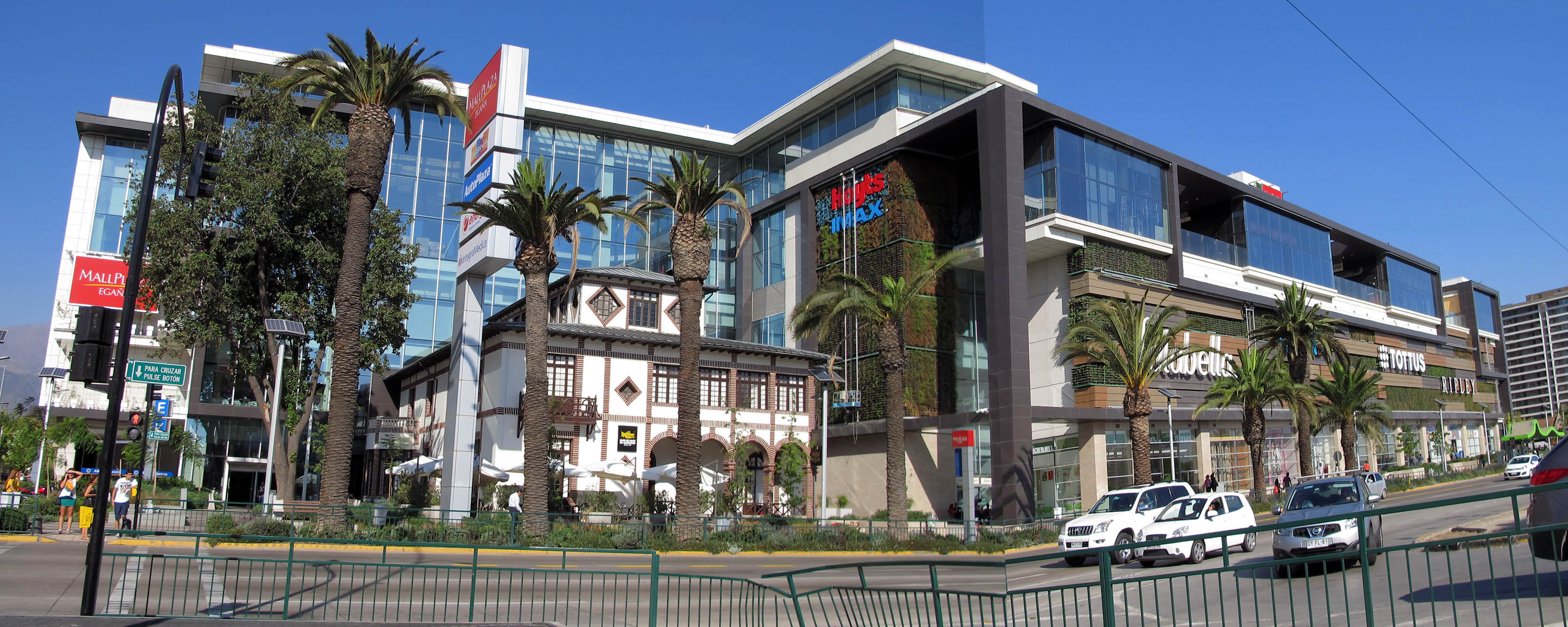
Mallplaza Egaña

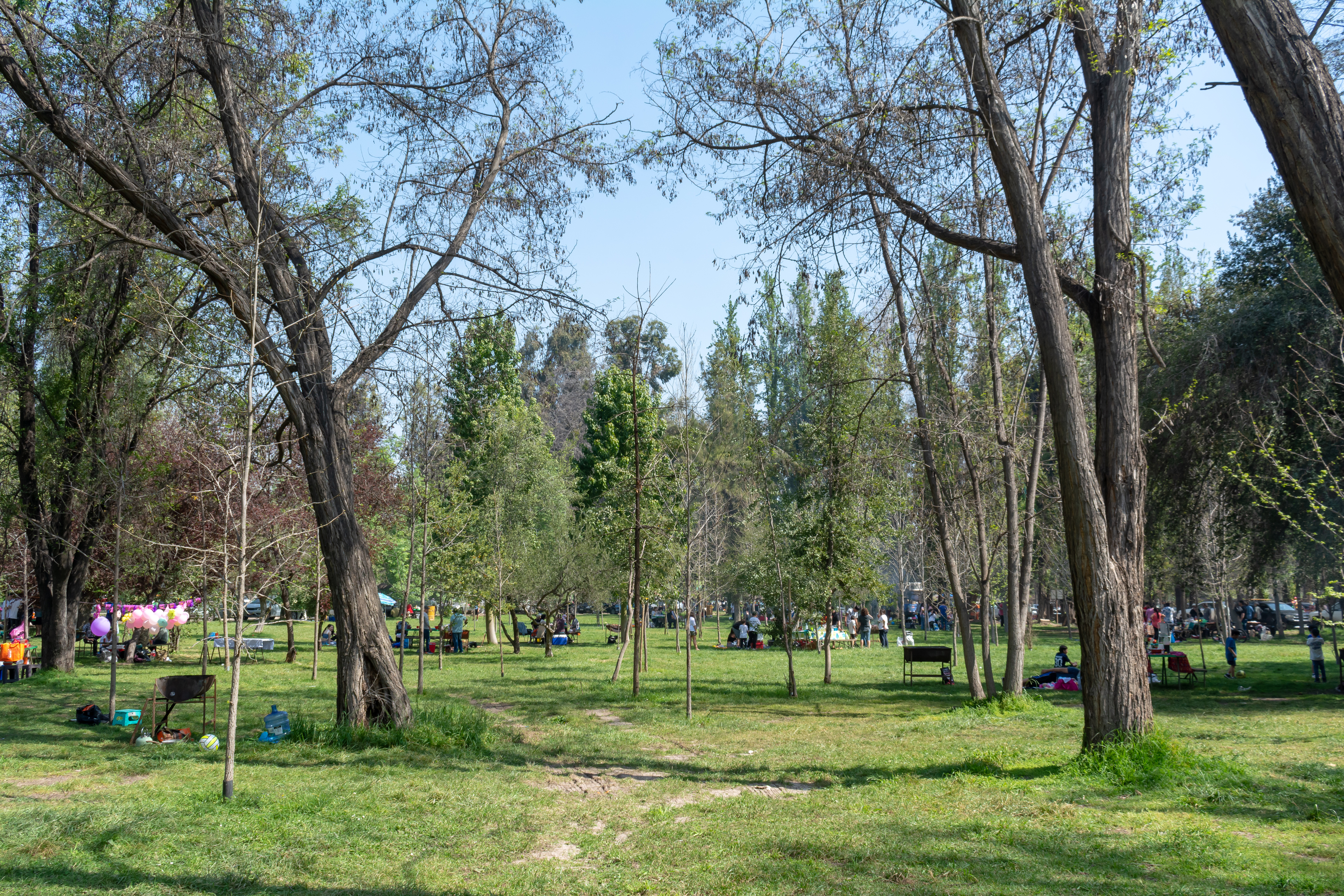
Parque Padre Hurtado

La Reina (Spanish for "The Queen"; distorted from Larraín) is a commune located in the Santiago Province in the Santiago Metropolitan Region in Chile, created in 1963 from an eastern portion of Ñuñoa. It belongs to the Northeastern zone of Santiago. It has 89,870 inhabitants.

La Reina is a residential commune inhabited by mostly mid- to upper-mid income families and high-income groups. The Eulogio Sánchez Airport and Military Hospital are both located in the southern part of the commune.

== Administration ==
As a commune, La Reina is a third-level administrative division of Chile administered by a municipal council, headed by a mayor who is directly elected every four years. The mayor since 2016 has been José Manuel Palacios Parra (UDI). The municipal council for the 2024–2028 term has the following members:

- Manuel José Covarrubias Cerda (UDI)
- Ursus Trotter Lecaros (UDI)
- Luis Acevedo Sánchez (Ind/UDI)
- Rodolfo del Real Mihovilovic (RN)
- Cristián del Canto Quiroga (PS)
- Fernando Encina Waissbluth (FA)
- Mauricio Martin Hartwig (REP)
- Lisette Gautier García (REP)

=== Parliamentary Representation ===
La Reina belongs to Chile's Electoral District No. 11, along with the communes of Lo Barnechea, Vitacura, Las Condes, and Peñalolén, and to the VII Senatorial Constituency (Metropolitan Region of Santiago).

In the Chamber of Deputies of Chile, it is represented (2022-2026 term) by:

- Catalina Del Real Mihovilovic (RN)
- Guillermo Ramírez Diez (UDI)
- Francisco Undurraga Gazitúa (EVOPOLI)
- Tomás Hirsch Goldschmidt (AH)
- Cristián Araya Lerdo de Tejada (REP)
- Gonzalo De la Carrera Correa (Ind)

In the Senate of Chile, it was represented by Carlos Montes from the PS and Manuel José Ossandón from RN during the 2014-2022 period.

== Demographics ==
As of the 2024 census, the population is 89,870, of which 47.0% are males, and 53.0% are females. People under 15 years old make up 16.3% of the population, and people over 65 years old make up 17.9%. 100% of the population is urban.

Historical population
Year	Pop.	±% p.a.
1970	55,048	—
1982	80,452	+3.21%
1992	92,410	+1.40%
2002	96,762	+0.46%
2017	92,787	−0.28%
2024	89,870	−0.46%
Source: INE, Memoria Chilena

- Average annual household income: US$42,248 (PPP, 2006)
- Population below poverty line: 7.8% (2006)
- Regional quality of life index: 86.23, high, 4 out of 52 (2005)
- Human Development Index: 0.883, 5 out of 341 (2003)

=== Ethnic minorities ===
As of the 2024 census, Indigenous peoples make up 4.5% of the population, and Afro-Chileans make up 0.5%.

=== Religion ===
As of the 2024 census, 63.3% of the population over 15 years old are Christians (53.4% Catholics, 6.0% Evangelicals or Protestants, and 3.8% other branches), 0.5% are Jews, 0.1% are Muslims, 0.3% are Buddhists, 0.1% are Hinduists, 0.9% are adrehents of other religions, and 34.9% are irreligious.

=== Immigration ===
As of the 2024 census, immigrants make up 7.3% of the population - 5.3% are from South America, 0.9% from North America, 0.9% from Europe, 0.2% from Asia, 0.02% from Africa, and 0.04% from Oceania.

== Education ==
=== Private ===
- The Grange School
- Andrée English School
- Saint John's Villa Academy
- British Royal School
- Colegio de La Salle
- Colegio Santo Domingo

=== Public ===
- Educational Complex of La Reina (Complejo Educacional de La Reina)
- Swiss Confederation School (Colegio Confederación Suiza)
- Yangtsé School (Colegio Yangtsé)
- Palestinian School (Escuela Palestina)
- San Constantino School (Colegio San Constantino)
- Eugenio María de Hostos School (Liceo Eugenio María de Hostos)
- Developmental School for Special Needs (Escuela Especial de Desarrollo)

== Notable people ==
- Michelle Bachelet, former President of Chile
- Fernando Castillo Velasco, architect, former mayor of La Reina and former governor of the Santiago Metropolitan Region
- Amanda de Negri Quintana, lawyer and former political prisoner under Pinochet's regime
- Mónica Echeverría Yáñez, writer
- Fernando González, retired tennis player
- Erich Honecker, former president of East Germany, who spent the last years of his life (1993–1994) in La Reina
- Margot Honecker, former Education Minister of East Germany, wife of Erich Honecker
- Ricardo Lagos, former President of Chile
