= Francisco Undurraga =

Chilean politician (born 1965)

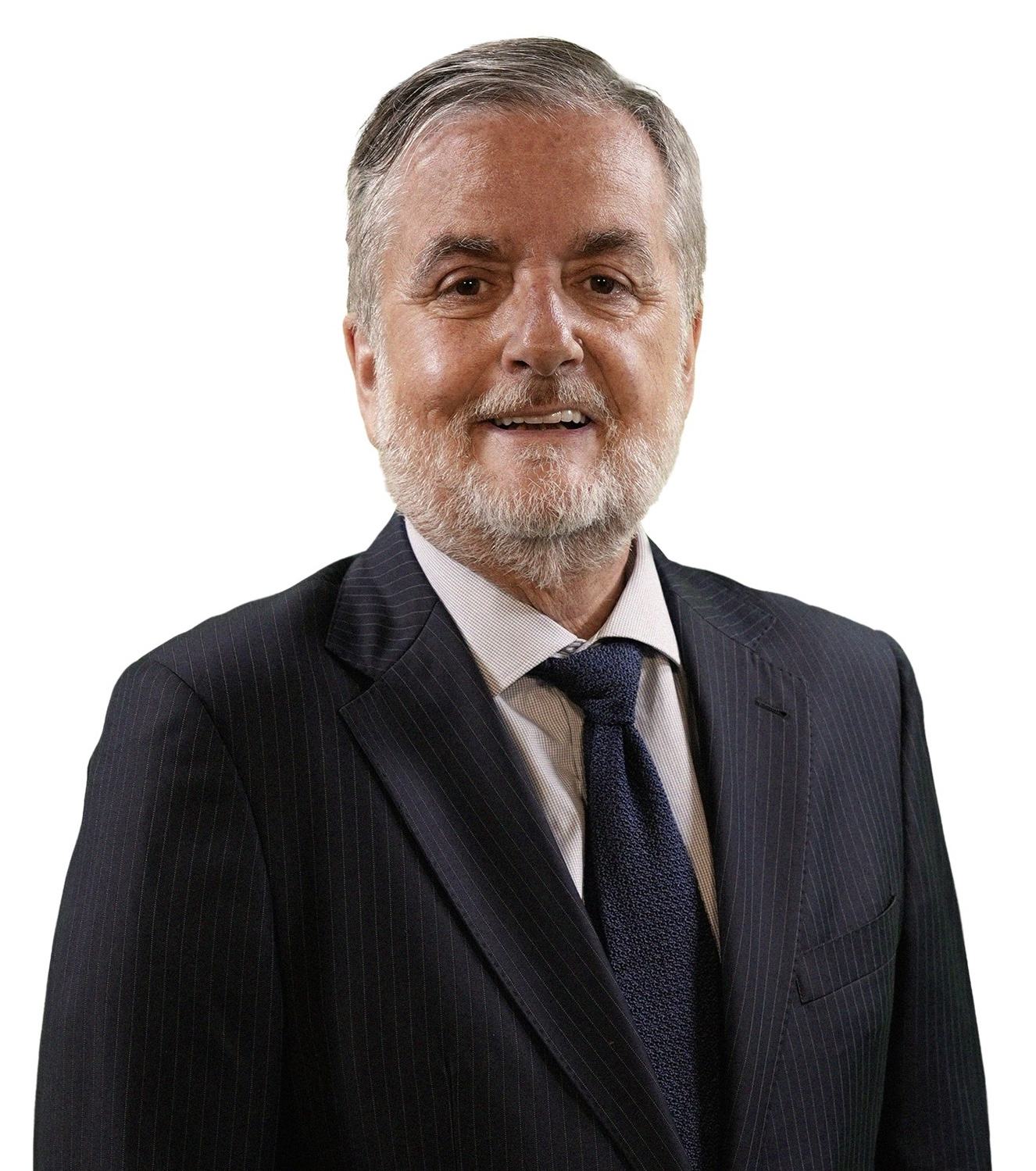
- Official portrait, 2026

Minister of Cultures, Arts and Heritage
- Incumbent
- Assumed office 11 March 2026
- President: José Antonio Kast
- Preceded by: Carolina Arredondo

Member of the Chamber of Deputies
- In office 11 March 2018 – 11 March 2026
- Constituency: 11th District

President of Evópoli
- In office 24 July 2017 – 6 May 2018
- Preceded by: Jorge Saint Jean
- Succeeded by: Hernán Larraín Matte

Personal details
- Born: 29 September 1965 (age 60) Santiago, Chile
- Party: Evópoli
- Spouse: Paulina Dressel Roa
- Children: 3
- Education: St. Ignatius El Bosque
- Alma mater: Andrés Bello National University
- Occupation: Publicist • Businessman • Politician

Juan Francisco Undurraga Gazitúa (born 29 September 1965) is a politician currently serving as Minister of Cultures, Arts and Heritage under President José Antonio Kast.

Previously he served as First Vice President of the Chamber of Deputies of Chile and as a member of the Chamber of Deputies representing District 11 of Santiago. He also served as First Vice President of the Chamber of Deputies between 7 April 2020 and 11 March 2022.

== Biography ==
Undurraga was born in Santiago on 29 September 1965. He is the son of Juan Francisco Undurraga Mackenna and visual artist María Teresa Gazitúa Costabal.

He is the grandson of Pedro Undurraga Fernández, a former candidate for city councillor in Santiago, former president of the Social Christian Conservative Party, and founder of Viña Undurraga.

Undurraga was born without his legs and one arm, due to his mother being exposed to X-rays after a traffic accident, not being aware she was pregnant. At age 15, he appeared in the 1980 Chilean telethon.

He is married to Paulina Dressel Roa and is the father of three children.

=== Professional career ===
Undurraga completed his primary and secondary education at St. Ignatius El Bosque. After graduating in 1984, he studied Television Directing and Broadcasting at the AIEP Professional Institute and Advertising at the Mónica Herrera School of Communication, obtaining the professional degree of Advertising Technician in 1991.

His professional career includes work as a producer at Radio Chilena (1988), an executive at Banco de Chile (1994), Marketing Manager at Mega (1999–2001), and Production Manager at La Red (2001–2004).

In 2001, together with his sister, he founded the ice cream company Emporio La Rosa S.A., where he served as General Manager until selling the company in 2016.

He also served as president of the Labour Inclusion Committee of SOFOFA, as marketing manager at ING, and is a founder of the Inclusive Business Network. Additionally, he has been a long-standing collaborator with Fundación Teletón.

=== Political career ===
In 2016, Undurraga left his business activities and joined the Political Evolution Party (Evópoli). He served as Secretary General of the party and, in July of the same year, assumed the presidency of Evópoli, a position he held until 5 May 2018.

In the 2017 parliamentary elections, he ran as a candidate for the Chamber of Deputies in the 11th electoral district—comprising the communes of Las Condes, Vitacura, Lo Barnechea, La Reina, and Peñalolén—representing Evópoli within the Chile Vamos coalition. He was elected for the 2018–2022 term with 58,666 votes, equivalent to 15.58% of the votes cast.

In the internal Evópoli elections held on 15 and 16 August 2020, he was elected Vice President of the party for the 2020–2022 period.

In August 2021, he ran for re-election in the same district and was elected in November representing Evópoli within the Chile Podemos Más coalition, obtaining 43,625 votes, equivalent to 10.56% of the valid votes cast.

He ran again for re-election in the 11th district in the parliamentary elections held on 16 November 2025, representing Evópoli within the Chile Grande y Unido coalition. He was not elected, obtaining 34,368 votes, equivalent to 6.46% of the total valid votes.
