= Undurraga =

Undurraga is a surname. Notable people with the surname include:

- Alberto Undurraga (born 1969), Chilean politician and economist
- Francisco Undurraga (born 1965), Chilean politician
- Cristián Undurraga (born 1954), Chilean architect
- Paz Undurraga (1930–2019), Chilean singer

== See also ==
- Viña Undurraga, wine producer
