= Claudia Barattini =

Chilean politician

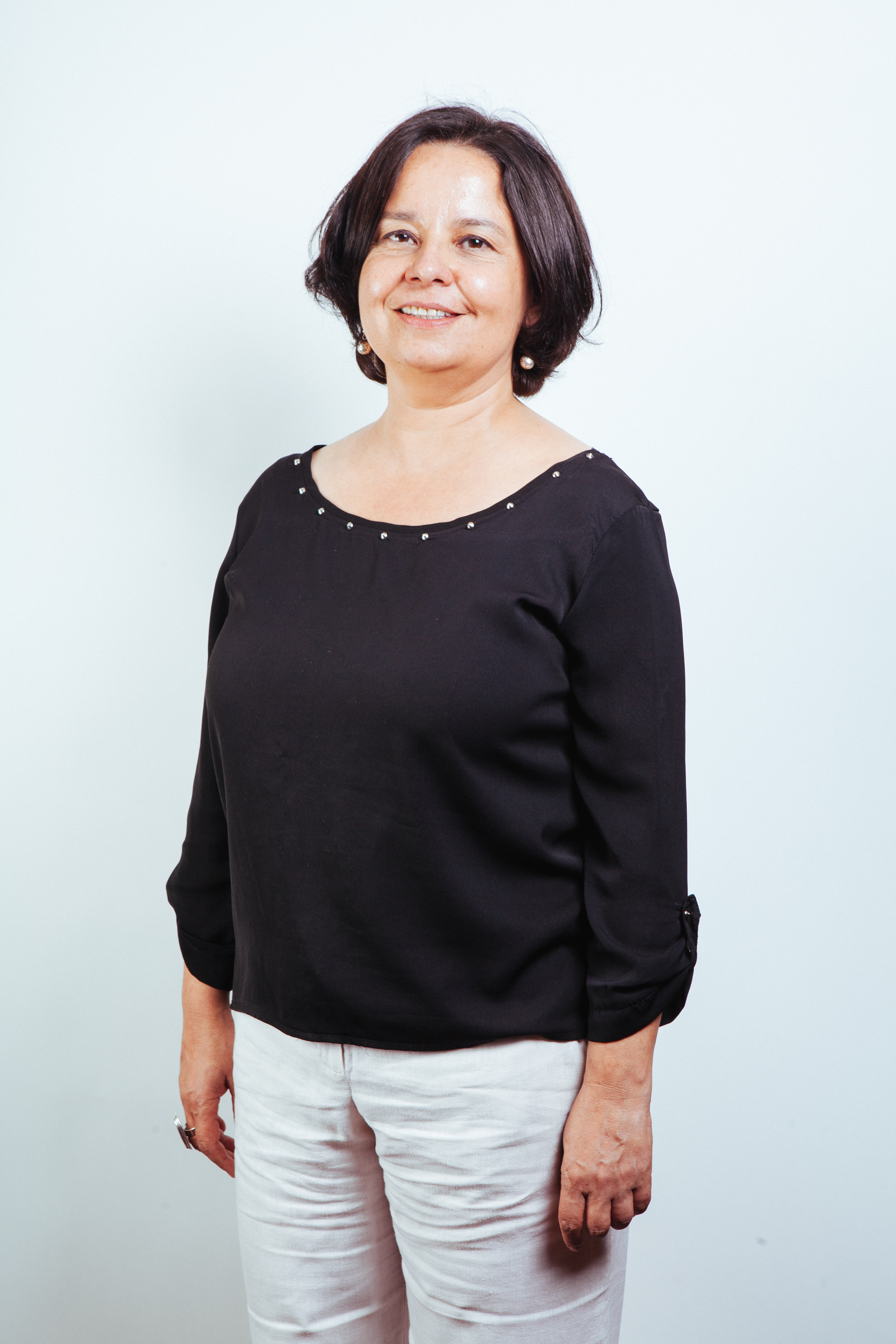

Minister of Culture
- In office 11 March 2014 – 11 March 2018
- Preceded by: Roberto Ampuero
- Succeeded by: Ernesto Ottone

Personal details
- Born: 6 August 1960 (age 66) Valparaíso, Chile
- Party: Democratic Revolution
- Education: UMCE (BA); University of Chile; La Sapienza University of Rome
- Occupation: Politician; Scholar

Claudia Barattini Contreras (born 1960) is a Chilean teacher and political scientist. She was a minister during the second government of Michelle Bachelet.

Barattini was director of La Morada Women's Development Corporation (1998−1999), cultural attaché of the Chilean Embassy in Italy (2006−2010) and director of Foreign Affairs of the Teatro a Mil Foundation (2010−2014). For three seasons, she was the curator of the Chilean pavilion at the Venice Biennale.

== Early life and education ==
Barattini is the daughter of Juan Salvador Barattini Carvelli, a teacher of Italian descent, and Marta Albertina Contreras Laporte.

During the Popular Unity (UP) government of President Salvador Allende, she joined the Communist Youth of Chile. Following the 1973 Chilean coup d'état led by General Augusto Pinochet, Barattini went into exile with her family in 1974. She first lived in Poland and later in Italy, where she studied classical ballet at the National Dance Academy in Rome and completed three years of economics studies at Sapienza University of Rome.

Barattini returned to Chile during the 1980s. She initially enrolled in business administration at the University of Chile, but left the programme during her first semester to study history education at the Metropolitan University of Educational Sciences.

== Political career ==
A feminist, Barattini joined the education programme of the feminist organization La Morada in 1989. The organization had been founded in 1982 by Julieta Kirkwood, Antonieta Saa, and Margarita Pisano.

She served as director of the Corporation for the Development of Women La Morada from 1998 to 1999, cultural attaché at the Chilean embassy in Italy from 2006 to 2010, and director of international affairs at the Fundación Teatro a Mil between 2010 and 2014. She also served for three years as commissioner of the Chilean pavilion at the Venice Biennale of Art and Architecture (2007–2009).

On 24 January 2014, President-elect Michelle Bachelet announced Barattini's appointment as head of the National Council for Culture and the Arts. She took office on 11 March 2014 and served until 11 May 2015, when she was succeeded by Ernesto Ottone. From 1 June 2016 to 11 March 2018, she served as Chile's cultural attaché in Mexico.
