= Alejandra Pérez =

Alejandra Pérez may refer to:

- Alejandra Pérez Espina (born 1977), Chilean political activist
- Alejandra Pérez Lecaros (born 1963), Chilean politician and lawyer
