= Carolina Arredondo =

Chilean politician

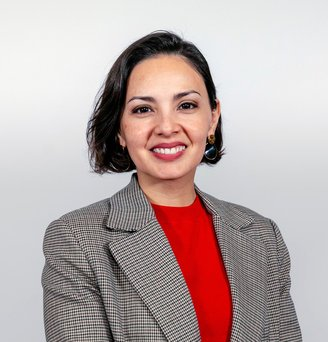
- Arredondo in 2023

Minister of Cultures, Arts and Heritage
- In office 16 August 2023 – 11 March 2026
- President: Gabriel Boric
- Preceded by: Jaime de Aguirre
- Succeeded by: Francisco Undurraga

Personal details
- Born: 20 June 1986 (age 40) Santiago, Chile
- Parent(s): Claudio Arredondo; Carolina Marzán
- Education: Universidad Mayor; University of Chile (Dip.)
- Occupation: Actress politician

Carolina Arredondo Marzán (born 20 June 1986) is a Chilean actress who serves as Chile's Ministry of Cultures, Arts and Heritage.

== Biography ==
She was born on 20 June 1986 in Santiago. She is the daughter of actor, theatre director and former municipal councillor Claudio Arredondo Medina, and actress and member of the Chamber of Deputies of Chile Carolina Marzán, who has represented District No. 6 since 2018. She is the granddaughter of actors César Arredondo García and Gabriela Medina Espinoza.

She studied acting at the Theatre School of Universidad Mayor, under the direction of Rodrigo Pérez Müffeler and during the deanship of Héctor Noguera. She later completed a postgraduate diploma in aesthetic direction at the University of Chile.

She has worked as creator and instructor of the Pre-university Theatre Program at Universidad Mayor and as a lecturer in acting and actor direction at the Chilean Film School. She has also been an active participant in the Fundación Internacional Teatro a Mil (FITAM), taking part in various productions and maintaining an ongoing association with its projects.

In 2019, Arredondo was elected to the national executive board of SIDARTE (the Chilean Actors’ Union), receiving 41.1% of the vote and achieving the highest individual vote share in the election.

She later served as a member of the Board of Directors of the Centro Cultural Gabriela Mistral (GAM), representing the Cultural Corporation of the Municipality of Santiago during the mayoralty of Irací Hassler. In 2022, she was appointed as a sectoral councillor of the National Council of Performing Arts under the Ministry of Cultures, Arts and Heritage during the administration of President Gabriel Boric.
