= St. Aloysius College, Antofagasta =

St. Aloysius College
- Spanish: Colegio San Luis

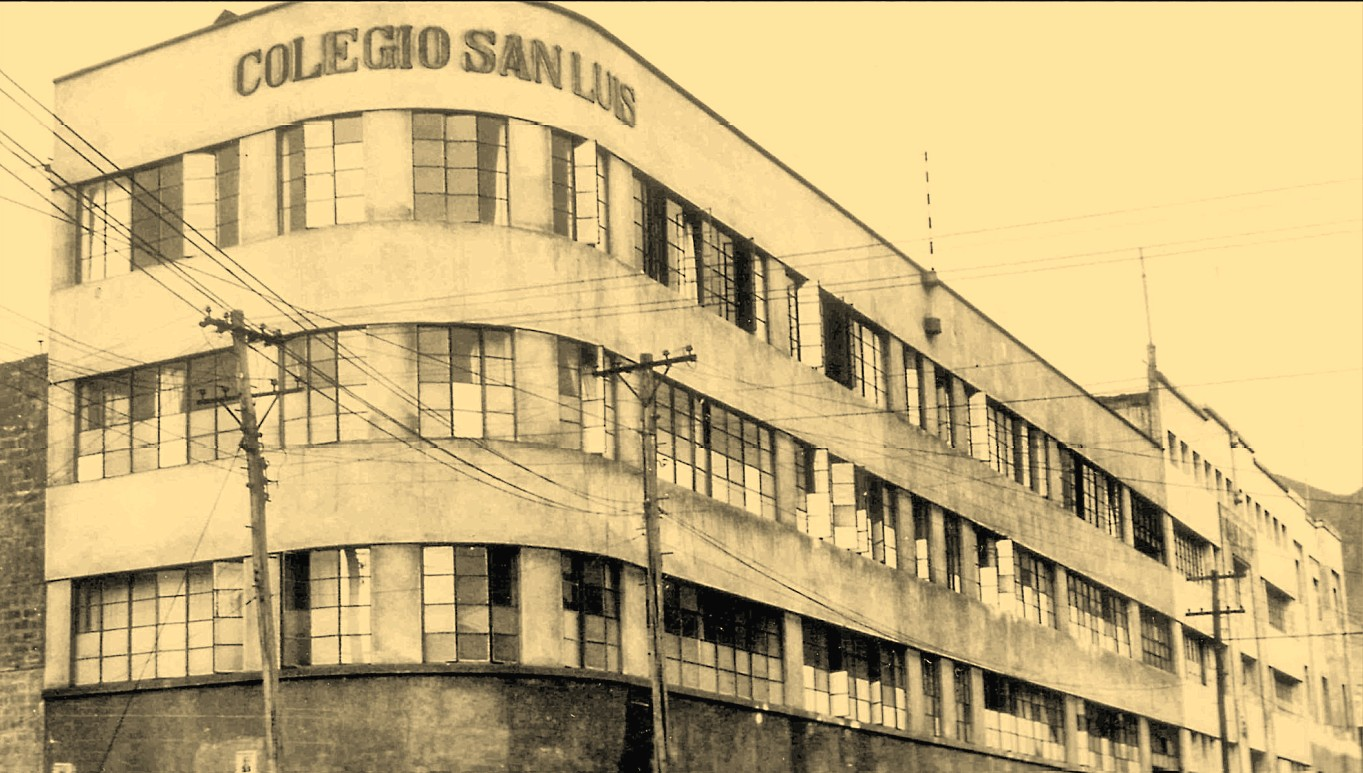

Location
- 855 Baquedano; Antofagasta, Antofagasta Province; Chile
- Coordinates: 23°39′4″S 70°23′42″W

Information
- Type: Private primary and secondary school
- Religious affiliation: Catholicism
- Denomination: Jesuit
- Patron saint: Aloysius Gonzaga
- Established: 1916; 110 years ago
- Founder: Luis Silva Lazaeta; Society of Jesus
- Rector: Alex Pizarro
- Gender: Boys: 1916 – 2011; Co-educational: since 2012
- Enrollment: 800
- Mascot: Lion
- Publication: Boletín San Luisino
- Affiliations: Latin American Federation of the Society of Jesus (FLACSI); Ignatian Educational Network
- Website: www.colegiosanluis.cl

St. Aloysius College (Spanish: Colegio San Luis) is a private Catholic primary and secondary school, located in Antofagasta, Antofagasta Province, Chile. The school was founded by the Society of Jesus in 1916 and is part of the Ignatian Educational Network of Chile and the Latin American Federation of the Society of Jesus (FLACSI).

== History ==
The Bishop of Antofagasta, Luis Silva Lazaeta, already had Heart of Mary primary school run by the Claretians and a girls' school run by the Sisters of Providence of Saint Mary-of-the-Woods when he recognized the need to create a secondary school. In 1916 he finalized plans and founded St. Aloysius. Its first director was the German Florián Blümel of the Society of the Divine Word, who arrived along with Albino Seeger. The College opened in 1916 to 20 students who soon increased, in a house located at 361 Baquedano Street.

In 1922 the school moved to a new building built by the architect Cousiño Calavera in Baquedano. In 1935 Blümel asked the new archbishop Alfredo Cifuentes Gómez to look for a teaching congregation to take charge of the school. The Society of Jesus accepted and the first teachers arrived the same year. In 1936 they took charge of the College. Blümel retired in 1936 and died in Antofagasta on 29 October 1940. He was replaced by Nicanor Marambio, S.J., who had been a rector for the last ten years. This Jesuit's educational activities were not limited to St. Aloysius, as he also founded the J. F. Blümel High School for poor children with educational problems. In 1988 the municipality of Antofagasta gave the name of Nicanor Marambio to a complex located in the Bonilla settlement, in the northern sector of the city.

By the middle of last century, the enrollment grew significantly.

After the coup d'état of September 1973, thanks to the personal contacts of Renato Hasche who was rector at that time, it was possible to exempt San Luis from the branch of National Security Doctrine that had been imposed by the military regime. At this time the school was distinguished for hosting professors exonerated for political reasons.

== Notable alumni ==
- Eric Goles - mathematician
- Patricio Jara - journalist and novelist
- Radomiro Tomic - politician
- Edmundo Pérez Zujovic - businessman and politician

== Gallery ==
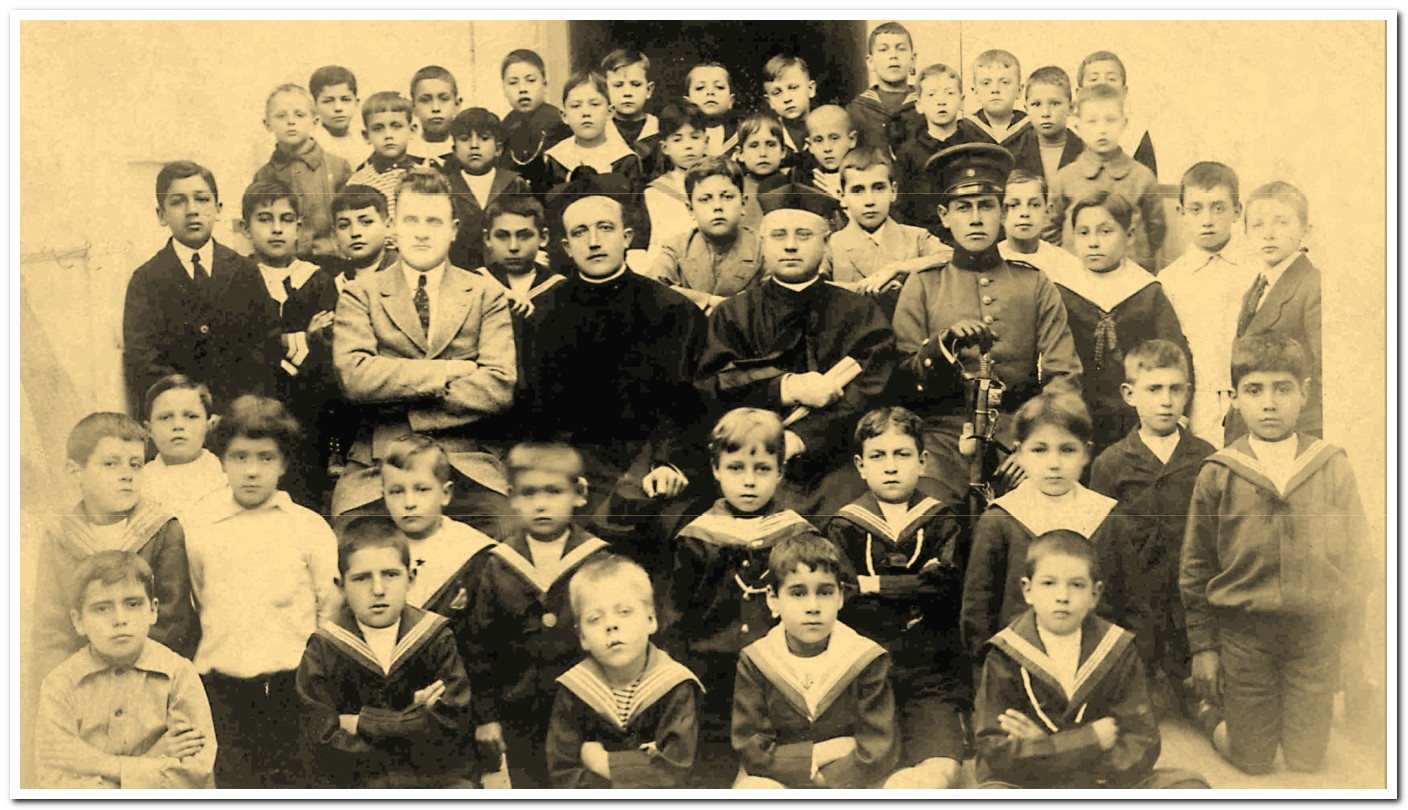
The German founders Florián Blümel and Albino Seeger with students in 1916

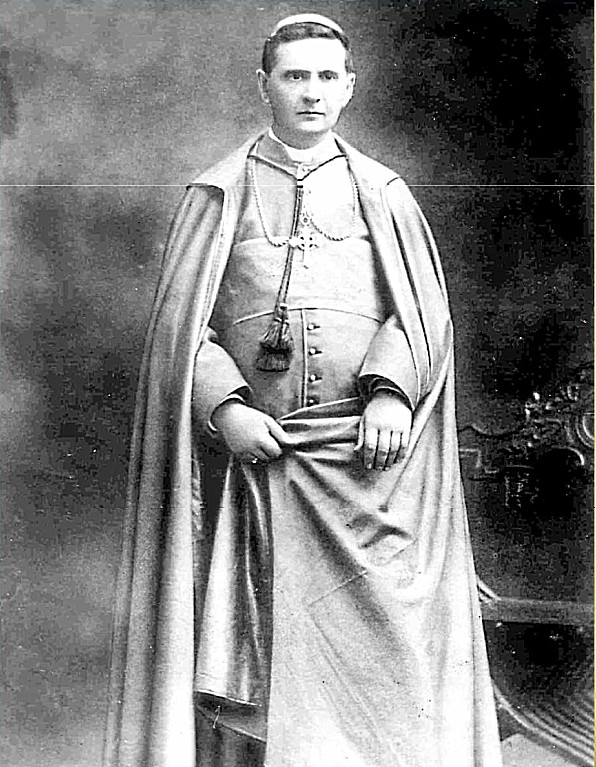
The Archbishop of Antofagasta, Luis Silva Lazaeta

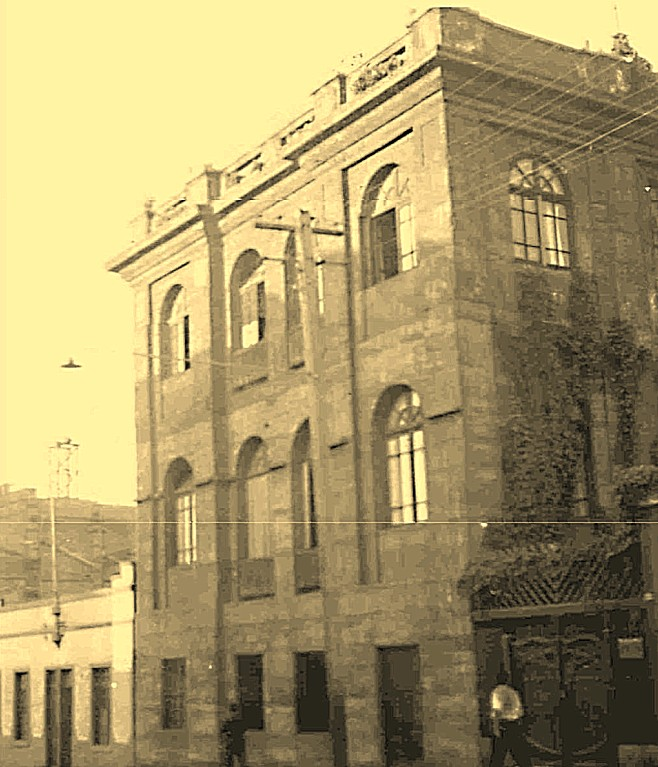
The first San Luis building

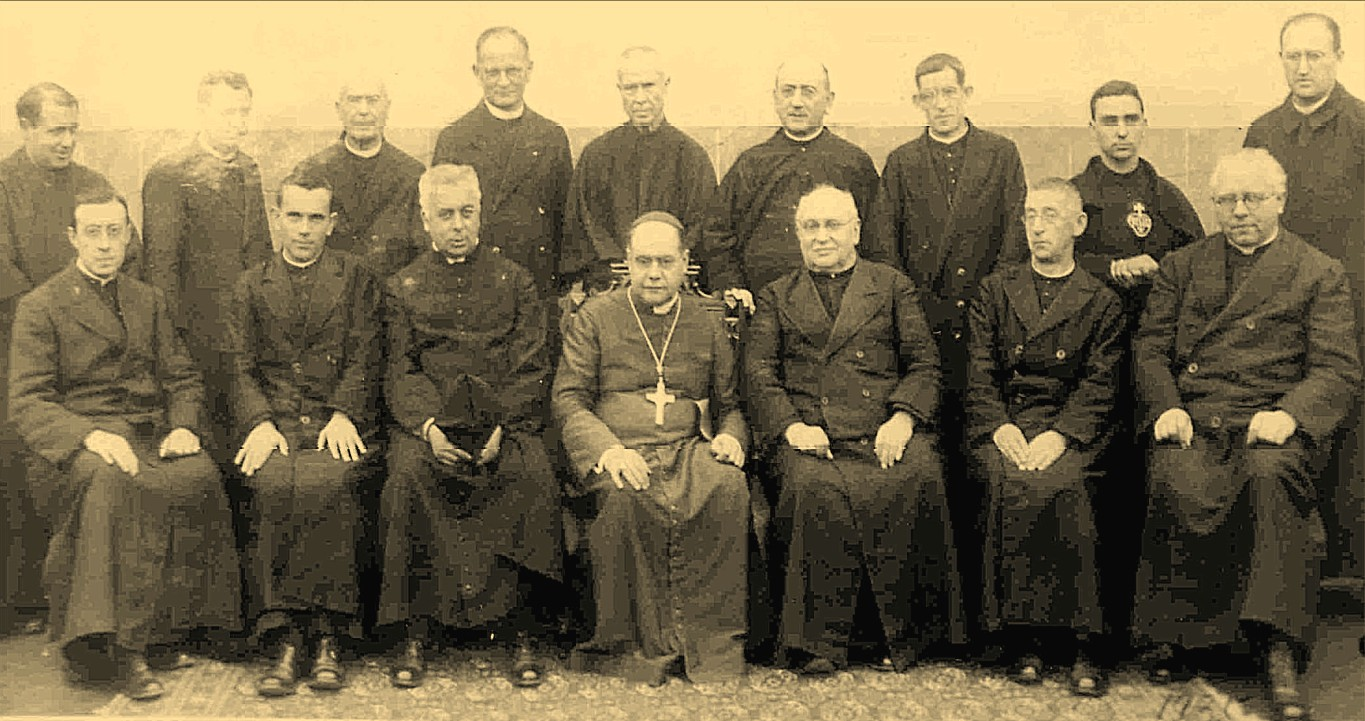
Archbishop Alfredo Cifuentes (center) with the German fathers and first Jesuits. Nicanor Marambio, the inaugural Jesuit rector in 1935 (first on left)

== See also ==
- Catholic Church in Chile
- Education in Chile
- List of Jesuit schools
