= Jaime de Aguirre =

Chilean politician

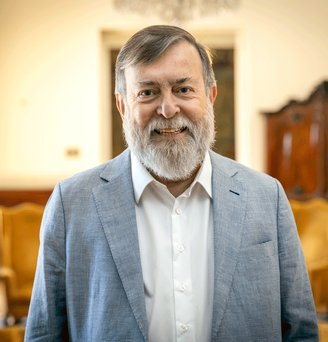
- Jaime de Aguirre in 2023

Minister of Cultures, Arts and Heritage
- In office 10 March 2022 – 16 August 2023
- President: Gabriel Boric
- Preceded by: Julieta Brodsky
- Succeeded by: Carolina Arredondo

Head of Televisión Nacional de Chile
- In office 16 December 2016 – 6 December 2018
- Preceded by: Alicia Hidalgo
- Succeeded by: Alicia Zaldívar
- In office August 2000 – August 2001
- Preceded by: René Cortázar
- Succeeded by: Pablo Piñera

Personal details
- Born: 2 February 1952 (age 74) Santiago, Chile
- Party: Popular Unitary Action Movement (−1973)
- Spouse: Tati Penna (1991-1997)
- Education: University of Chile (No degree); University of Surrey (Dip.)
- Occupation: Television producer musician politician

Jaime de Aguirre Hoffa (born 2 February 1952) is a Chilean artist who served as Chile's Minister of Cultures, Arts and Heritage during Gabriel Boric's presidency.

== Music producer ==
After beginning studies in law at the University of Chile, which he did not complete, he completed a diploma in sound engineering at the University of Surrey in the United Kingdom.

Upon returning to Chile, he joined the production company Filmocentro, founded by Jaime O'Ryan and Francisco Vargas, which was based in the former Peña de los Parra. There, he managed recordings for several artists of the Alerce label during the 1980s. He participated in the musical production of the first anthem of the Teletón (premiered at the third edition), as well as the 2003 version marking the 25th anniversary of the campaign, as composer of the slogan “The Teletón is yours, don’t forget it!”. He also took part in the “No” campaign for the 1988 Chilean national plebiscite, composing the jingle “Chile, la alegría ya viene”, and worked on the soundtracks of films such as Imagen latente (1987), Caluga o menta (1990), ¡Viva el novio! (1990), La frontera (1991), and Archipiélago (1992).

In parallel, he participated in the jazz fusion groups Kámara (1978–1980), where he played bass, and Tercera Generación (1979–1982), where he performed as a double bass player.

== Television career ==
In the late 1980s, he joined the team of the independent news programme Teleanálisis.

In 1991, one year after the return to democracy, reinstated executive director Jorge Navarrete offered him the position of director of programming at Televisión Nacional de Chile (TVN). Thanks to his management—first alongside Navarrete and later with Carlos Hurtado and René Cortázar—the network experienced significant financial gains.

He resigned from the position in April 2002, the same month he assumed office as chief executive officer of Chilevisión following the high-profile departures of Felipe Pozo and Jaime Vega. During his tenure, he led the channel to first place in audience ratings in 2011, with programmes such as Primer Plano, the youth-oriented show Yingo, and a news editorial line with a strong focus on crime reporting. In May 2015, after 13 years in the role—the longest-serving executive director in the network’s history, having worked under three different owners—he was dismissed from Chilevisión.

On 26 April 2016, he assumed the role of director of programming at Canal 13, although he remained in the position for only five months, until 30 September of that year. During the second government of Michelle Bachelet, on 16 December 2016, he was appointed executive director of TVN following the dismissal of Alicia Hidalgo. He held the position until 6 December 2018, when he resigned during the second government of Sebastián Piñera.

== Political career ==
During the 1970s, he was a member of the Popular Unitary Action Movement (MAPU). In later years, he became an independent, remaining close to the centre-left. In the context of President Gabriel Boric’s second cabinet reshuffle, on 10 March 2023 he was appointed Minister of Cultures, Arts and Heritage, succeeding anthropologist Julieta Brodsky.

== Personal life ==
He is the third of five children born to the marriage of Augusto de Aguirre—son of a Peruvian citizen—and Anne Marie Höffa, a German immigrant who arrived in Chile in 1939.

He has been married twice, including a marriage to journalist and singer Tati Penna between 1991 and 1997, and is the father of five children, two of whom—Constanza and Santiago—were born from his relationship with Penna.
