= St. Matthew's College, Chile =

St. Matthew's College
- Spanish: Colegio San Mateo

Location
- Osorno, Los Lagos Region; Chile
- Coordinates: 40°34′53″S 73°7′36″W

Information
- Former name: Institute of St. Matthew
- Type: Private secondary school
- Religious affiliation: Catholicism
- Denomination: Jesuit
- Patron saint: Matthew (apostle)
- Established: 1932; 94 years ago
- Founder: Society of the Divine Word
- Teaching staff: 62
- Grades: Pre-K through secondary
- Gender: Co-educational
- Enrollment: 1,142
- Campus: 5.7 hectares (14 acres)
- Publication: El Cultrún
- Affiliations: Latin American Federation of the Society of Jesus (FLACSI); Educational Network of Chile
- Website: www.sanmateo.cl

St. Matthew's College (Spanish: Colegio San Mateo) is a private Catholic secondary school, located in Osorno, in the Los Lagos Region of Chile. The school was founded by the Society of the Divine Word in 1932 as the Institute of St. Matthew. The current school is part of the Ignatian Educational Network of Chile and the Latin American Federation of the Society of Jesus (FLACSI).

== History ==
The first school in Osorno, which was named San Mateo and was founded in 1835, is the oldest historical antecedent of the current school that the Sanmateans record. However, the little school had an ephemeral life, because it closed after two years, destroyed by the earthquake of November 1837. A half century later, in 1890, it reopened under the direction of the Fr. Francisco Bohle, but there is no data to confirm that it was in continuity with the original San Mateo.

The missionaries of the Society of the Divine Word took over direction of the school in 1913, when it acquired the name of the German Liceo de Osorno. A fire reduced it to ashes in 1927 and five years later, in 1932, it reopened its doors as the Institute of St. Matthew at the same address on Mackenna Street. In 1958 the German priests of the Divine Word communicated to Bishop Francisco Valdés Subercaseaux that they could not continue running San Mateo. He asked the Jesuits to take charge which they did. In 1959 John Henry, Henry Haske, Joseph O'Neill, Frank Nuggent, James Mc Namara, and Bernard Boyle came from the Maryland Province of the Society of Jesus in the United States.

After the 1960 Valdivia earthquake, John Henry became director and the school was now called St. Matthew College. The Jesuits opened a new building in April 1965 on Barros Arana Street. They also undertook to integrate poorer children from the city and from rural areas, with money received from Maryland. In 1981 the primary school was located at Wenceslao Ramos Street. The three divisions, preschool, primary, and secondary, currently occupy 11 acres and 3 acres respectively.

Though male from its founding, San Mateo began admitting girls in 2005. In 2010 it became a private educational establishment and in 2011 stopped receiving a state subsidy, although it grants scholarships to needy students.

== Rectors ==
The following individuals have served as rectors of St Matthew's College:

Ordinal	Officeholder	Term start	Term end	Time in office	Notes
1	Fr. John Henry, SJ	1960	1965	4–5 years	
2	Fr. Henry Haske, SJ	1966	1968	1–2 years	
3	Fr. Bernard Boyle, SJ	1969	1974	4–5 years	
4	Fr. Carlos Hurtado, SJ	1975	1975	0 years	
5	Fr. Carlos Aldunate, SJ	1975	1975	0 years	
−	Fr. Bernard Boyle, SJ	1976	1981	4–5 years	Cumulative time in office is c. 9 years
6	Fr. Fernando Salas, SJ	1982	1987	4–5 years	
7	Fr. Juan Miguel Leturia, SJ	1988	1988	0 years	In 2005, Leturia was found guilty of sexual abuse during his time as rector
8	Fr. Thomas Gavin, SJ	1989	1996	6–7 years	
9	Fr. Alejandro Pizarro, SJ	1997	2003	5–6 years	
10	Fr. Juan Pablo Cárcamo, SJ	2003	2009	5–6 years	
11	José Reyes Santelices	2009	2014	4–5 years	
12	Alejandro Aguirre Moraga	2015	incumbent	10–11 years	

== Noyable alumni ==
- Álvaro Gómez, actor

== See also ==
- Catholic Church in Chile
- Education in Chile
- List of Jesuit schools
