= St. Francis Xavier College, Puerto Montt =

St. Francis Xavier College
- Spanish: Colegio San Francisco Javier

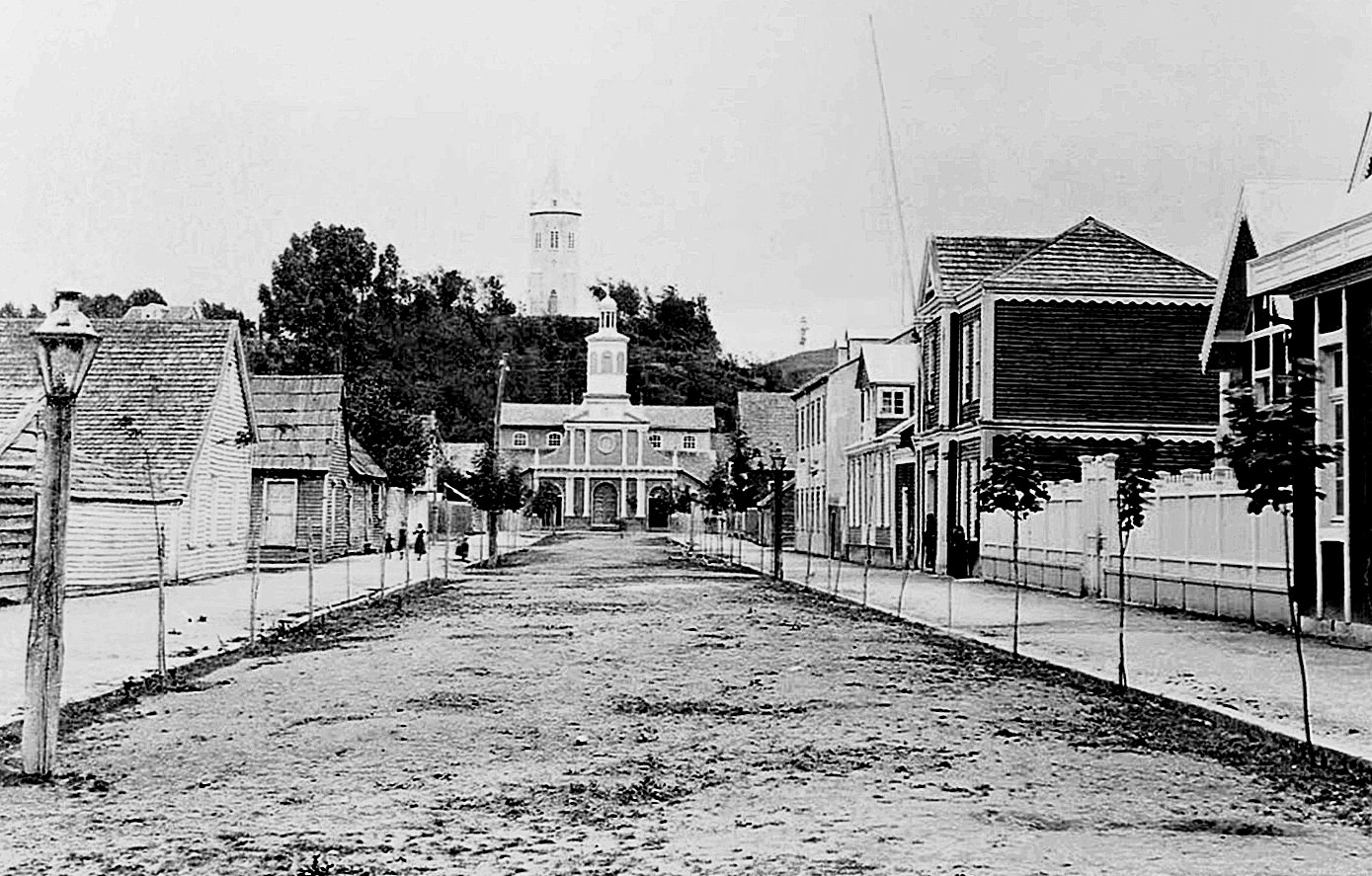
- Jesuit Church on Rengifo St, Puerto Montt, c. 1890s

Location
- Puerto Montt; Chile
- Coordinates: 41°28′13″S 72°56′32″W

Information
- Type: Private primary and secondary school
- Religious affiliation: Catholicism
- Denomination: Jesuit
- Patron saint: Francis Xavier
- Established: 1859; 167 years ago
- Founder: Francisco de Paula Solar; Society of Jesus
- Teaching staff: 113
- Grades: K-12
- Gender: Co-educational
- Enrollment: 1,000
- Affiliations: Latin American Federation of the Society of Jesus (FLACSI); Ignatian Educational Network of Chile
- Website: www.colsanjavier.cl

St. Francis Xavier College (Spanish: Colegio San Francisco Javier) is a private Catholic primary and secondary school, located in Puerto Montt, Chile. Founded by the Society of Jesus in 1859, the school is affiliated with the Ignatian Educational Network of Chile and the Latin American Federation of the Society of Jesus (FLACSI). One of the oldest schools in Chile, it originally served the immigrant German colony in southern Chile.

== History ==
The history of the establishment begins in 1859, with the arrival of the founders, Jesuits Teodoro Bernardo Engbert Schwerter and Joseph Schörber, at the city of Puerto Montt. They came at the request the bishop of the Diocese of San Carlos de Ancud, Francisco de Paula Solar, made to Pieter Beckx, then general of Society of Jesus. The mission of the Jesuits, who arrived in Puerto Montt on 22 March 1859, was to provide educational and religious services to Catholic settlers in the area.

In 1872 the Jesuit Church was built in Puerto Montt and ten years later in 1882 a new school opened with its present name, San Francisco Javier. In 1893 the school moved to Guillermo Gallardo Street next to the church and remained there for a century.

In 1890, a bell tower was built within the school property. In 1905 a clock was added, and is still operative. The four bells were made in Austria. The largest, called San Jose, weighs 1,750 kilograms (3,860 lb) and was installed in 1894.

== See also ==
- Catholic Church in Chile
- Education in Chile
- List of Jesuit schools
