= Colegio San Bartolomé La Merced =

San Bartolomé La Merced School

Location
- Kr.5 No. 33-80; Bogotá; Colombia; 4.619887°N 74.064245°W

Information
- Type: Private
- Motto: "Wherever there is a Bartolino, there will be a gentleman, and wherever there is a Bartolina, there will be a lady"
- Religious affiliation: Catholic
- Denomination: Jesuits
- Established: 1941; 85 years ago
- Founder: Bartolomé Lobo Guerrero
- Rector: Diego Cristancho S.J
- Enrollment: 1,724
- Campus size: 34.59 acres (14.00 ha)
- Colours: Dark blue, yellow and red
- Slogan: "Be more to better serve"
- Mascot: Magpie
- Information: (+571) 343 63 00
- Website: www.sanbartolo.edu.co

Founded in 1941, Colegio San Bartolomé La Merced is a private, Catholic, bilingual, and co-educational school in Bogotá, Colombia offering Cambridge international curriculum. Affiliated with the Society of Jesus (Jesuits), it's fondly known as "San Bartolo." The school's campus sits within the traditional La Merced neighborhood in downtown Bogotá.

The school is member of UNCOLI (Association of International Schools of Bogota), ACODESI (Association of Jesuit Schools in Colombia), and FLACSI (Latin American Federation of the Society of Jesus).

== History and Traditions ==
Origins and Development:

In the 1930s, political pressure from the Colombian government regarding the management of the National School of San Bartolomé (now Colegio Mayor de San Bartolomé) presented financial challenges for the Society of Jesus. To ensure educational continuity, the Jesuits initiated the construction of a new school on La Merced farm in 1941. This marked the birth of Colegio San Bartolomé La Merced.

Transformation and Modernization:

From its founding until 1997, Colegio San Bartolomé La Merced operated as an all-boys boarding school. Recognizing the evolving needs of education, the school embarked on a modernization process. This included transitioning to a co-educational and bilingual model.

== Academics ==
Colegio San Bartolomé La Merced offers a comprehensive education spanning pre-school, preparatory, secondary, and high school levels within its single campus. The school's all-year programs provide a foundation in liberal arts while also offering a variety of elective courses to cater to students' interests.

To enhance global perspectives and language skills, Colegio San Bartolomé La Merced offers a bilingual education, primarily focusing on Spanish and English. The school emphasizes the development of strong communication skills in both languages, integrating them throughout the curriculum to ensure students are proficient and comfortable using both. The school collaborates with select institutions worldwide to offer English as a Second Language and summer school programs overseas. These programs provide students with immersive language learning experiences in countries such as the United States, Canada, England, and New Zealand.

== Notable alumni ==
- Adolfo Carvajal Quelquejeu, politician
- Enrique Luque Carulla, entrepreneur, former owner of the Colombian supermarket chain, Carulla
- Fernando Londoño Hoyos, former minister of Colombia
- Juan Camilo Restrepo, former minister of Colombia
- Carlos Eduardo Ronderos Torres, former minister of Colombia
- Guillermo Fernández de Soto, former minister of foreign affairs of Colombia
- Anibal Fernández de Soto, former mayor of Bogota
- Augusto Ramirez Ocampo, former mayor of Bogota
- Fernando Panesso Serna, ambassador
- Salomón Hakim, neurosurgeon, professor and researcher
- Rene Van Hissenhoven, geologist
- Crístobal de Araque Ponce de León, perpetual chancellor of Our Lady of the Rosary University
- Fernando Garavito, journalist
- José Fernando Neira, journalist
- Julio Sánchez Cristo, Colombian radio personality
- Hernán Peláez Restrepo, journalist
- Felipe Zuleta Lleras, journalist
- Gustavo Gómez Córdoba, journalist
- Fernando Hinestrosa Forero, attorney, former justice of Colombian Supreme Court, President Universidad Externado
- Diego López Medina, professor at Universidad de los Andes, Faculty of Law, judge ad-hoc of the Inter-American Court of Human Rights
- Antonio Barreto, professor at Universidad de los Andes, Faculty of Law
- Aquiles Arrieta, Judge Ad-Hoc Constitutional Court of Colombia
- Antonio Abello, former minister of Colombia and governor of Atlantico department
- Jaime Herrera Pontón, physician
- Jaime Pastrana Arango, physician
- Alejandro Martinez, artist
- Nicolás Montero, artist
- Héctor Osuna, architect
- Luis Ernesto Lobo-Guerrero, Professor at University of Groningen (Netherlands)
- Juan Diego Soler, astrophysicist at the Institute d'Astrophysique Spatiale Universite Paris Sud
- Mario Andrés Salazar, Biologist at the Ozcan Laboratory (Boston Children's Hospital, Harvard Medical School)

== See also ==
- List of Jesuit educational institutions
