= Mauricio Rojas =

Chilean-Swedish politician (born 1950)

- Rojas in 2025

Member of the Riksdag
- Incumbent
- Assumed office 26 September 2022
- Constituency: Skåne County Western
- In office 30 September 2002 – 10 November 2008
- Preceded by: Lars Leijonborg
- Succeeded by: Helena Bargholtz
- Constituency: Stockholm County

Ministry of the Cultures, the Arts and Patrimony of Chile
- In office 9 August 2018 – 13 August 2018
- President: Sebastián Piñera
- Preceded by: Alejandra Pérez Lecaros
- Succeeded by: Consuelo Valdés

Personal details
- Born: June 28, 1950 (age 76) Santiago, Chile
- Citizenship: Chile • Sweden
- Party: Liberals (since 2001)
- Other political affiliations: Revolutionary Left Movement (1967–1969); Moderates (1999–2001)
- Spouse: Mónica Mullor
- Children: 4
- Education: University of Chile (B.A); Lund University (B.A) (Ph.D)
- Occupation: Economist • Writer • Politician

Mauricio José Rojas Mullor (born June 28, 1950) is a Chilean-Swedish politician and political economist, member of the Riksdag between 2002 and 2006. He served as Minister of Cultures, Arts and Heritage of Chile for four days, from August 10, 2018 to August 13, under the presidency of Sebastián Piñera.

Mauricio Rojas was born in Santiago, Chile. As an active socialist and member of MIR in his youth, he fled to Sweden in 1974 following the military coup and the subsequent persecution of leftist activists by the new Pinochet regime. After coming to Sweden as a refugee he changed his political views and became a proponent for liberalism.

Rojas received a Ph.D. in economic history from Lund University in 1986 and became Docent (Associate Professor) of Economic History at Lund University in 1995. Rojas was a lecturer at Lund University from 1981 to 1999, when he became the Director of the Centre for Welfare Reform at the Stockholm-based think tank Timbro. Lately, he was both Vice President and President of Timbro.

Rojas was elected as a Member of Parliament in 2002 for the Liberal Party, although he was not a party member at the time. He became a member of the Liberal People's Party in 2004 when he was appointed as the party's spokesperson on refugee and integration policy. In 2006 he initiated a second period in Parliament. He is member of the Constitutional Committee of the Swedish Parliament.

He has written several books in the field of international economics, immigration matters and on the Swedish model, many of them translated into several languages. Available in English are The Rise and Fall of the Swedish Model (London, 1998), Millennium Doom (London, 1999), Beyond the Welfare State (Stockholm, 2001) and The Sorrows of Carmencita: Argentina’s Crisis in a Historical Perspective (Stockholm, 2002). His latest published book is Reinventar el Estado del bienestar (Madrid, 2008).

== Biography ==
He is the son of José Rojas Inostroza and Juana Luz Mullor Guzmán, the latter a trade unionist and member of the Socialist Party of Chile, who voted for Salvador Allende in his four presidential campaigns. After separating from her husband, she raised Mauricio together with his father, a Spanish immigrant to Chile, Catholic and supportive of Francoism. He is married to Mónica Beatriz Mullor Navarro.

Rojas has stated that he was a member of the Revolutionary Left Movement (MIR) between 1967 and 1969. However, the MIR's then secretary-general Andrés Pascal Allende later declared that he “did not know him” and that Rojas “was not a member of the MIR”.

He graduated from the Liceo de Aplicación in 1966 and entered the law program at the University of Chile in 1967, which he later abandoned in order to work at the Housing Corporation (Corvi) during the Popular Unity government.

=== Exile in Sweden ===
Following the military coup of September 1973, his mother was detained at Villa Grimaldi by the dictatorship's security services for sheltering a socialist professor who was being sought by authorities.

In October 1973, Rojas traveled to the Polish city of Oświęcim (formerly Auschwitz), and in January 1974 moved to Sweden, where his mother was living as a political refugee. He obtained residence in Sweden through family reunification laws rather than as a political refugee.

In Sweden, he initially participated in the MIR Support Group until 1975. According to Rojas, he enrolled in mechanical courses with the intention of building weapons and attempted to travel to Cuba for guerrilla training, but was unable to do so due to bureaucratic issues. In subsequent years, he embraced liberalism and became a strong critic of left-wing ideas, which reportedly distanced him from his mother. In 1979, after reading one of his published columns, she told him: “You ruined my life”.

=== Ideological shift ===
His ideological shift was reflected in his doctoral dissertation Renovatio Mundi, defended in Lund in 1986. Rojas received a Ph.D. in economic history from Lund University in 1986 and was awarded the title of docent (associate professor) by the same institution in 1995, where he taught between 1981 and 1999.

He has written around twenty books published in various languages in the fields of comparative economic history, immigration, and the Swedish model and its welfare state. He has also written on political philosophy, particularly on Marxist political thought and liberalism. Between 1999 and 2004, he served as deputy director and later director of Timbro, a liberal think tank based in Stockholm.

== Political career ==
Rojas initially collaborated with the Moderate Party. In 2002 he was elected to the Riksdag as an independent candidate on the list of the Liberal People's Party (PPL), formally joining the party in 2004 and becoming one of its main spokespeople on integration and immigration policy.

In 2006, the party's youth wing (Liberala ungdomsförbundet) called for his removal as spokesperson over statements described as xenophobic by its representative Fredrik Malm. Although he was not re-elected that year, he shortly returned to the Riksdag, replacing party leader Lars Leijonborg after the latter became Minister for Education. He later served on the Committee on the Constitution and the Labour Market Committee before resigning from parliament in late 2008.

Rojas returned to Chile, where he was appointed Minister of Cultures, Arts and Heritage on 9 August 2018, replacing Alejandra Pérez Lecaros. His appointment generated controversy due to statements he had made in a 2016 interview with CNN en Español, in which he questioned and criticized the work of the Museum of Memory and Human Rights. His remarks drew criticism from intellectuals and public figures, including Marxist poet Raúl Zurita, who publicly called for his resignation. The musical group Los Jaivas also decided not to participate in a tribute scheduled for 12 August, despite Rojas having withdrawn from the event the previous day.
