= Chile, la alegría ya viene =

Studio album by Various artists
- Genre: Pop; classical music; jazz; children's music
- Length: 22:38
- Language: Spanish
- Label: Alerce
- Producer: Jaime de Aguirre

Chile, la alegría ya viene is a 1988 studio album released by the Alerce label in support of the "No" option campaign in the Chilean national plebiscite of that year. The song of the same name became the official jingle for the campaign.

== Production ==
The rainbow used by the "No" campaign appeared on the album art.

The lyrics of the main theme, written by Sergio Bravo, were originally written with much darker themes, talking about the murders and disappeared prisoners of the military dictatorship, but when Eugenio García, the director of the "No" campaign, gave him the phrase "Chile, la alegría ya viene" as the basis of the song, Bravo began to give meaning to the song with more positive messages.

Chilean musicologist Juan Pablo González explained that the song did very well in "playing with the metaphors of Canto Nuevo" because "you couldn't say things directly". In La Tercera, Marcelo Contreras described it as "a song that instead of black ponchos, guitars and beards, proposed color and hope in the return to democracy".

It was composed by Jaime de Aguirre, who had already composed the music for the song "Vamos a ganar", the eleventh song on the album, in 1987. "Vamos a ganar" was also sung by Javiera Parra and Cristián Lecaros. "No lo quiero, no" was recorded by Isabel, Javiera and Tita Parra, along with Tati Penna and Cecilia Echeñique.

The female singer of "Chile, la alegría ya viene", Rosa Escobar, worked at the Ministry of Public Works, which at the time was led by General Bruno Siebert. Given this, Escobar commented that this generated a risk in her career: her father, Daniel Escobar, who was part of Salvador Allende's cabinet, was a disappeared detainee.

The male voice of the song is by Claudio Guzmán, vocalist of the group QEP, who was assigned along with Rosa Escobar to be the main voices since their voices were common and people could identify with them.

== Track listing ==
Side one

All lyrics are written by Sergio Bravo; all music is composed by Jaime de Aguirre.

No.	Title	Length
1.	"Versión completa"	2:30
2.	"Versión infantil"	1:00
3.	"Versión mujer"	1:00
4.	"Versión clásica"	3:05
5.	"Versión hombre"	1:00
6.	"Marcha de la alegría"	1:06
7.	"Versión jazz fusión"	1:11
8.	"Versión completa"	2:30

Side two

No.	Title	Writer(s)	Length
1.	"No lo quiero, no"	Isabel Parra	3:54
2.	"Lo he visto yo"	Claudio Guzmán	3:24
3.	"Vamos a ganar"	Sergio Bravo; Jaime de Aguirre	3:20
