= Consuelo Valdés =

Chilean archeologist and politician

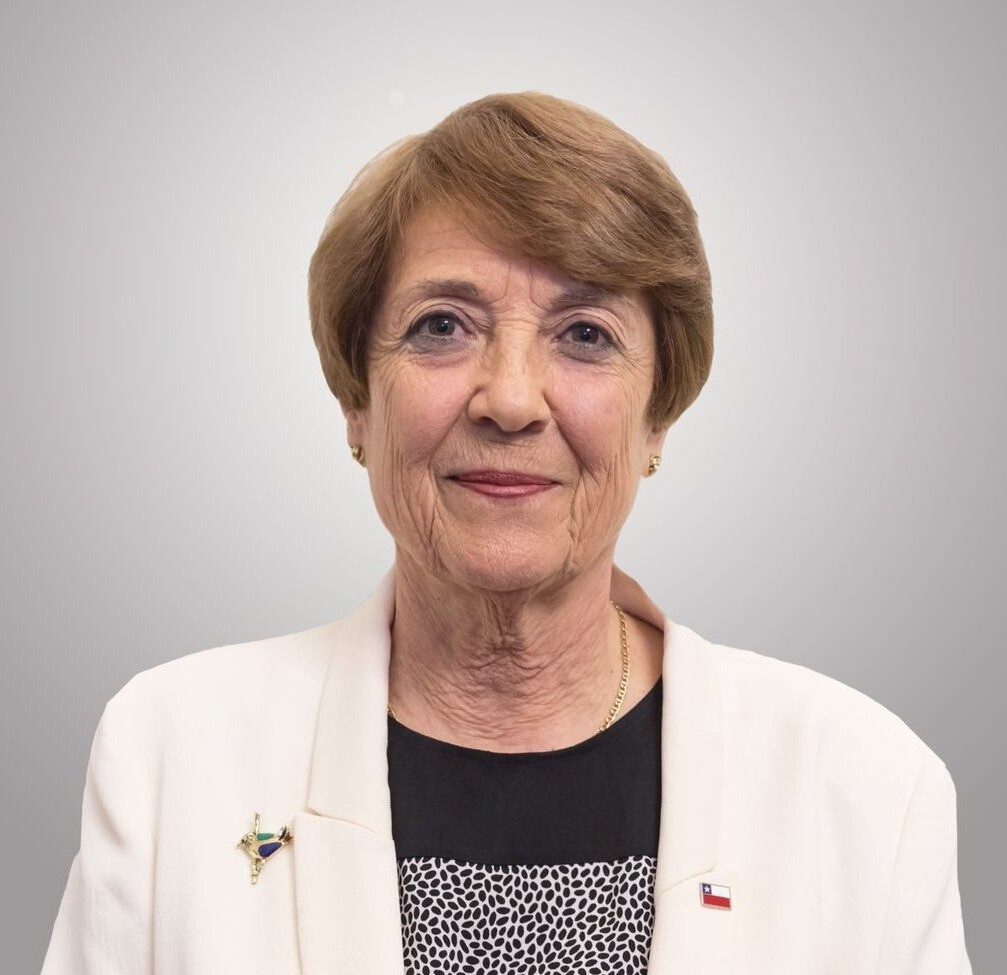
- Official portrait (2019)

Ministry of Cultures, Arts and Heritage
- In office 9 August 2018 – 11 March 2022
- President: Sebastián Piñera
- Preceded by: Mauricio Rojas
- Succeeded by: Julieta Brodsky

Personal details
- Born: 9 October 1948 (age 77) Santiago, Chile
- Party: Close to centre-right
- Parent(s): Aníbal Valdés; María Teresa Chadwick
- Education: Catholic University of the North (BA); University of Alabama (MA)
- Occupation: Politician
- Profession: Archeologist

Consuelo Valdés Chadwick (born 9 October 1948) is a Chilean politician and archeologist who served as Minister of Culture during Sebastián Piñera's second government.

== Family and education ==
She is one of three children of the marriage between Aníbal Carlos Valdés Larraín, a farmer, and María Teresa Consuelo Chadwick Larraín, a landscape designer. She is a distant cousin of former Minister of the Interior Andrés Chadwick, who served during both administrations of Sebastián Piñera, sharing great-great-grandparents. On her paternal side, she is a direct descendant of Presidents Francisco Antonio Pinto and Manuel Bulnes.

She is married to Tomás Chotzen Marcuse.

She holds a degree in archaeology from the Catholic University of the North. She earned a Master of Arts in Latin American Studies with a concentration in anthropology from the University of Alabama and completed a diploma in audiovisual production at Stanford University.

== Professional career ==
Between 1980 and 1982, she served as director of the Museo Regional de la Araucanía. In 1982, she created the National Coordination of Museums—now the National Subdirectorate of Museums—within the National Directorate of Libraries, Archives and Museums (DIBAM), a position she held until 1988.

She later served as cultural projects manager at Fundación Andes (1988–1993). She joined the board of the Corporación Artequín in Santiago and, in 2007, together with Carmen Vergara, coordinated the Casa Museo Eduardo Frei Montalva. In 2008, she became cultural advisor to the Municipality of Viña del Mar. From 2002 to 2010, she was a member of the National Television Council of Chile (CNTV).

After leaving the council, she became executive director of the Museo Interactivo Mirador (MIM).

Between 2011 and 2013, she served on the board of the Cultural Corporation of Estación Mapocho. Until September 2016, she was also a board member of Fundación Ciencia Joven and Fundación MediaBus.

On 13 August 2018, President Sebastián Piñera appointed her Minister of Cultures, Arts and Heritage, following the resignation of Mauricio Rojas.
