= Sergio Bravo (writer) =

Chilean television writer, screenwriter, playwright, and lyricist (1949–2022)

Sergio Eduardo Bravo Pemjean (30 June 1949 – 4 February 2022) was a Chilean television writer, screenwriter, playwright and lyricist.

== Life and career ==
Born in Santiago, Bravo was among the founders of the politically committed theatrical ensemble Teatro Aleph (Aleph Theatre). After the 1973 Chilean coup d'état and the company's forced dissolution, Bravo pursued a career as a television writer, collaborating with educational and children's programs and variety shows, notably Sábados Gigantes.

In 1988 Bravo wrote the lyrics of the song "Chile, la alegría ya viene", which was the hymn of the "No" option during the 1988 Chilean national plebiscite. After the end of the Pinochet dictatorship, he worked at Televisión Nacional de Chile until 2005, and during this time he created the popular telenovela Romané and the documentary series Nuestro siglo, which in 2000 won the award for best documentary at the International Federation of Television Archives Awards. Bravo's last work was the telenovela La Doña, he created in 2011.

Bravo died of heart attack on 4 February 2022, at the age of 72.
