= Julieta Brodsky =

Chilean anthropologist and politician (born 1983)

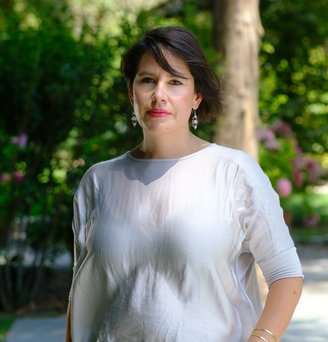

Minister of Cultures, Arts and Heritage
- In office 11 March 2022 – 10 March 2023
- President: Gabriel Boric
- Preceded by: Consuelo Valdés
- Succeeded by: Jaime de Aguirre

Personal details
- Born: 10 October 1983 (age 42) Santiago, Chile
- Party: Social Convergence
- Parent(s): Pablo Brodsky; Paula Hernández
- Education: University of Chile (B.S); Academy of Christian Humanism University (M.D)
- Occupation: Politician
- Profession: Anthropologist

Julieta Brodsky Hernández (born 10 October 1983) is a Chilean politician and anthropologist who has served as the Minister of Cultures, Arts and Heritage since 2022.

== Biography ==
She is the daughter of Pablo Augusto Brodsky and Paula Hernández Solimano. On her mother’s side, she is the granddaughter of journalist Luis Hernández Parker, and the granddaughter of painter Manuel Solimano Rebutti, a friend of Pablo Neruda. She is the niece of Ricardo Brodsky, former director of the Museum of Memory and Human Rights, and of writer Roberto Brodsky, and the cousin of Varinia Brodsky, current director of the National Museum of Fine Arts.

She spent her childhood in the town of Tongoy, in the Coquimbo Region.

She studied social and cultural anthropology at the University of Granada in Spain, and completed postgraduate studies toward a master's degree in urban anthropology at the Academy of Christian Humanism University. In addition, she holds a postgraduate diploma in the promotion and management of cultural rights.

== Professional career ==
Since 2011, she has served as director of research at the Observatory of Cultural Policies (OPC). She is also a partner of the cultural association Tramados.

She served as coordinator of the Socio-Family Integration Programme of FOSIS at SENDA between 2011 and 2012; as delegate of the Observatory of Cultural Policies in the Trama programme of the Network of Cultural Workers from 2014 to 2017; and as a researcher and content developer at the Cultural Corporation Tramados between 2017 and 2019. In 2018, she completed a postgraduate diploma in the promotion and management of cultural rights at the University of Buenos Aires in Argentina.

=== Research ===
Brodsky is a co-author of several studies published in the cultural field, including The Cultural Worker Landscape in Chile, The Role of Public Policies in the Labour Conditions of Musicians in Chile, and How Is Theatre Sustained in Chile?. She also authored the document Agenda Trama: Recommendations for the Development of the Arts in Chile.

== Political career ==
She was a member of the political party Social Convergence —now part of the Broad Front— and an active participant in its Cultural Front.

On 21 January 2022, she was appointed Minister of Cultures, Arts and Heritage during the government of Gabriel Boric. She assumed office on 11 March 2022 and served until 10 March 2023, when she was replaced by Jaime de Aguirre.

In February 2024, she assumed the position of director of the Cultural Corporation of Peñalolén, within the Municipality of Peñalolén.

She has been a strong critic of the government of Sebastián Piñera, whom she accused of failing to prioritise the cultural agenda during his administration.
