= 1980 Chilean telethon =

Charity event

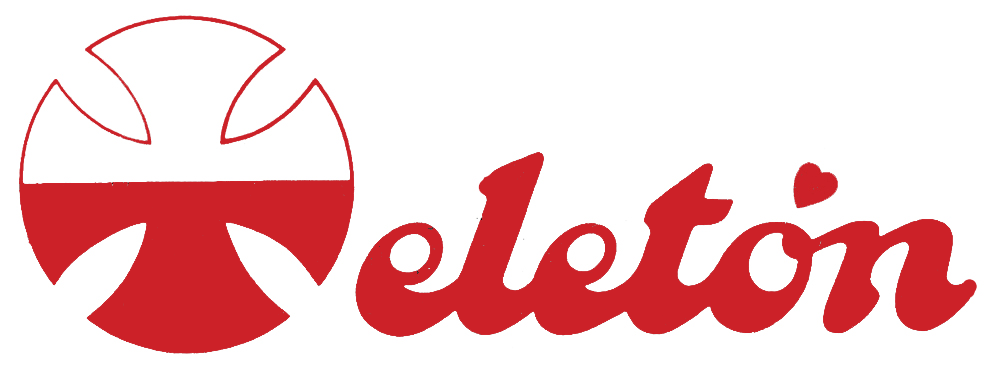
Chilean Telethon's logo

The 1980 Chilean telethon, the third version of the Chilean Telethon, was conducted in Chile on 5 and 6 December 1980 . The theme was "Standing hope"and the symbolic boy was José Morales who died on November 8, 2010 due to a degenerative lesion of the nervous system.

The goal was to reach CL$ 138,728,450, which again was surpassed with a total of CL$ 176,420,628.

The telethon featured an appearance from a 15-year-old Francisco Undurraga, who was born without his legs and one arm.

== Sponsors ==
Banco de Chile; Coca-Cola; Mantequilla Dos Álamos; Fideos Lucchetti; Pilsener Cristal; Leche Soprole; Johnson's Clothes; Nescafé; Supermercados Unicoop	Super Pollo; Zapatillas North Star; Cecinas La Preferida; Té Supremo; Odontine; Cola Cao; Postres Caricia; Merendina; Multti	Línea de Audio IRT; Insecticidas Baygon; Tarjetas de Crédito Visa; Consorcio Nacional de Seguros; Chicles Dos en Uno; Vinos Santa Carolina; Aceite Cristal; Helados Bresler

== Artists ==
- Gianni Bella
- Sergio y Estíbaliz

== Transmission ==
- 12.10.3.8 TVUN Red del Norte
- UCV Televisión
- Televisión Nacional de Chile
- Teleonce Universidad de Chile
- Corporación de Televisión Universidad Católica de Chile
