= Patricio Jara =

Chilean writer and journalist

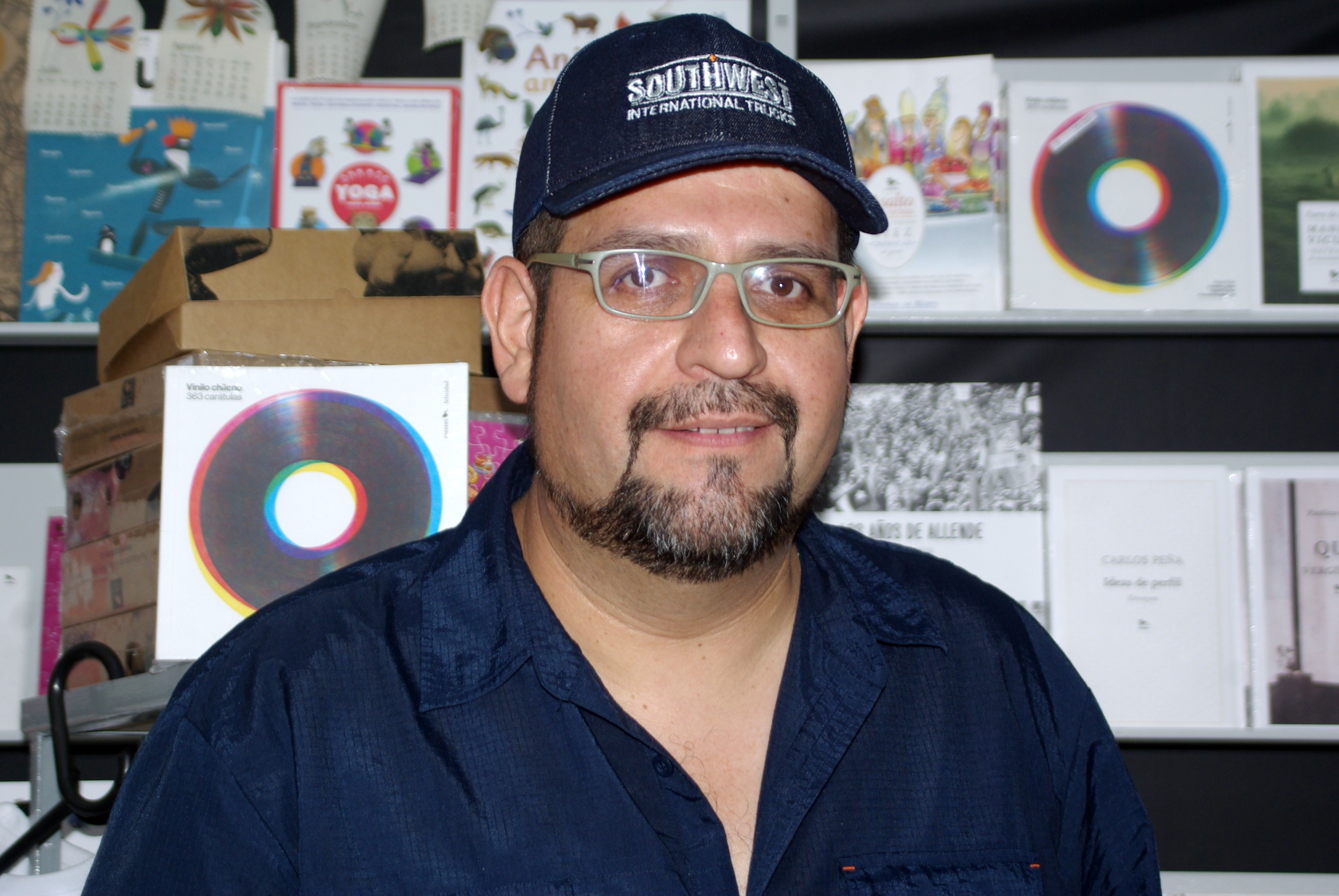
- At FILSA 2015
- Born: 4 May 1974 (age 52); Antofagasta, Chile
- Education: José Santos Ossa University
- Occupations: Writer, journalist
- Awards: Santiago Municipal Literature Award (2014)

Patricio Jara Álvarez (born 4 May 1974) is a Chilean writer and journalist.

== Biography ==
Patricio Jara grew up in Antofagasta and studied at the Jesuit Colegio San Luis, where he wrote his first stories.

Later he entered José Santos Ossa University, where he qualified as a journalist in 1996. In his time as a university student he won his first prizes. He worked at his alma mater and was coordinator of the literature program when it became the Universidad del Mar.

As a professor Jara has taught at various higher education establishments, such as Universidad Santo Tomás (Antofagasta campus), Diego Portales University (UDP) in Santiago, and Finis Terrae University (UFT). His articles have appeared in various media such as the Revista de Libros and Sábado (both of El Mercurio), Qué Pasa, and The Clinic. An extreme rock fan, he has published chronicles in Rolling Stone and written a kind of personal history of national metal music, as well as a biography of the Chilean death/thrash metal band Pentagram.

Since 2004 he has lived in Santiago, in the neighborhood of Ñuñoa, near the National Stadium, where he attends football matches. His love for this sport has been reflected in "Marihuana Álvarez", which was part of Gente que va al estadio (1997, with a foreword by Hernán Rivera Letelier), a book that also includes stories by two other journalists. In addition to teaching at UDP, he is an editor for Ediciones B. He is married and has two daughters.

== Literary career ==
The first book published by Jara was a compilation of his stories, Última ronda, which appeared in Antofagasta in 1996. Although he has continued to work in the short fiction genre, it is with his novels that he has achieved notoriety. In the first of these, he did not go far from the story, because it was a short novel destined for the youth audience, Ave satani (1999), which, reissued by Alfaguara in 2004, became De aquí se ve tu casa, and which reflects Jara's love for heavy metal.

His consecration in Chile came in 2002, when he won the award of the National Book and Reading Council for best unpublished novel of the year with El sangrado. It was at that time that the magazine Qué Pasa included him, together with Marcelo Simonetti and Alejandro Cabrera, in "the trio of the country's literary renewal", and Hernán Rivera Letelier wrote about Jara: "He always showed himself to be a literary animal. He eats, dreams, and fornicates literature. I see him as the leader of the nortina squad, holding strong in Santiago." His subsequent novels include, Prat (a fictional story of the naval hero Arturo Prat), Quemar un pueblo (2009), and Geología de un planeta desierto (2013).

The latter, praised by critics, contains autobiographical material of the relationship with his father (who died in 1998, "after a hard decade of alcoholism"), which was reflected in the evolution of the title. Jara called it first Géologo, then Novela de papá, and finally Geología... As for the influences on this work, he recognizes that of Michel Houellebecq, an author who "appears as a character at the end of the novel."

Jara's writing process is usually long, and sometimes takes years from the idea for a novel until the final version. In 2009, the year in which three of his books appeared, he explained in an interview: "I had thought of Prat since 2004 and I wrote it in 2008. I have been working on the stories in Las zapatillas... since 1994, back in my university days. And I began writing parts of Quemar un pueblo in 2005, when I was still living in Antofagasta."

== Awards and recognitions ==
- First prize at the Story Contest for Writers of the Northern Zone (1995, 1996, and 2001)
- First prize in the Dándole Genre Story contest (1995)
- Literary Creation Fellowship of the National Book Council
- Second place in the Pedro de Oña contest for his novella La elasticidad de los cuerpos, written thanks to a fellowship from the previous year
- Finalist of the Paula Story Contest
- 2002 Award of the National Book and Reading Council for best unpublished novel, for El sangrador
- Selected one of the leaders of 2002 (culture area) by El Mercurio's magazine Sábado in conjunction with Adolfo Ibáñez University
- 2014 Santiago Municipal Literature Award, novel category, for Geología de un planeta desierto

== Works ==
- Última ronda, stories, Universidad José Santos Ossa Press, Antofagasta, 1996
- Ave satani, young adult novella, Santos Ossa, Antofagasta, 1999; reissued as De aquí se ve tu casa, Alfaguara, Santiago, 2004
- Derivas, stories, La Uña Rota, España, 2000
- El sangrador, novel, Alfaguara, Santiago, 2002
- El mar enterrado, Seix Barral, Santiago, 2005
- El exceso, novel, Alfaguara, Santiago, 2007
- Prat, novel, Bruguera, 2009
- Las zapatillas de Drácula, young adult literature, Grupo Editorial Norma, 2009
- Quemar un pueblo, novel, Alfaguara, 2009
- Pájaros negros, chronicles of Chilean heavy metal, Ediciones B, 2012
- Geología de un planeta desierto, novel, Alfaguara, 2013
- Pentagram, biography of the Chilean band of the same name; bilingual edition together with a double disc, Germany, 2013
- Pájaros negros 2, more chronicles of Chilean heavy metal, Ediciones B, 2014
- El libro de Los Tenores y las historias de La Banda, Ediciones Lolita, Santiago, 2015
- Antipop, novel, Alfaguara, 2016
- Read in Blood 1986-2016: 30 años del clásico de Slayer, essay, Planeta, 2016
- Dios nos odia a todos, Emecé, Santiago, 2017
- El cielo rojo del norte, short stories, Alfaguara, Santiago, 2018
- Tragar el sol, Alfaguara, Santiago, 2020

=== Theater ===
- Pacífico, Theater Company of the University of Antofagasta, coauthor and director: Alberto Olguín, 2004
- Q. Un quijote urbano, Theater Company of the University of Antofagasta, coauthor and director: Alberto Olguín, 2005
