= Raquel Olea =

Chilena writer

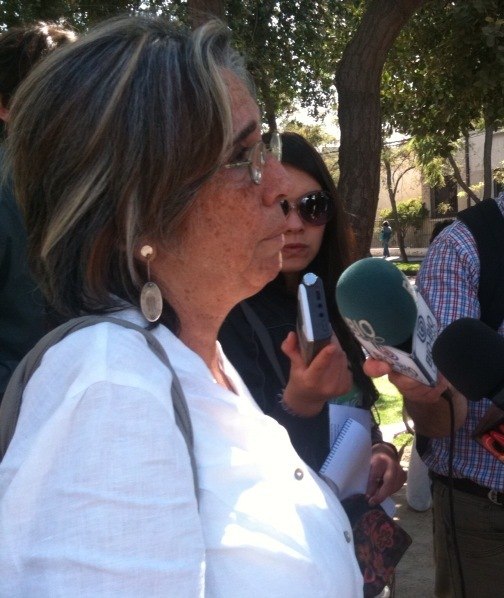
Raquel Olea (2011)

Raquel Olea (born 7 May 1944) is a Chilean writer, professor, cultural critic, and researcher. She is a Distinguished Professor of Arts, Letters, and Humanities (Emerita) at the University of Santiago. Her areas of research are Spanish, Chilean, and Latin American literature, as well as gender studies and women's literature, of which she was an important promoter during the time of the military dictatorship in Chile. She is recognized for her research on the work of Gabriela Mistral. Furthermore, Olea is a prominent figure of second-wave feminism in Chile during the Pinochet military dictatorship years.

== Biography ==
Raquel Olea studied literary studies at the University of Chile and later at the Goethe University Frankfurt in Germany, where she obtained her doctorate in Romance languages.

Olea worked as a professor in the Department of Linguistics and Literature of the Faculty of Humanities of the University of Santiago. She has been a visiting professor at University of California, Riverside and University of California, Berkeley, as well as at Duke University in North Carolina. She has lectured at Harvard University, New York University, and University of Helsinki. In 2000, she was awarded a Guggenheim Fellowship.

Olea participated in the feminist NGO, Corporación de Desarrollo de la Mujer La Morada ("La Morada"), established in 1983 during the military dictatorship, of which she became director. She also participated in La Morada's feminist community radio station Radio Tierra, from 1991 to 1998, where she hosted the program Hablando de Literatura en la Tierra (Speaking of literature on Earth). Olea participated in numerous literature and poetry meetings, of which the First International Congress of Latin American Women's Literature held in 1987 stands out. Through literary criticism in the newspaper La Época (1987-1998), Olea has promoted various Chilean poets.

== Selected works ==
- Ampliación de la palabra: la mujer en la literatura, Santiago, SERNAM, 1995
- Lengua víbora: producciones de lo femenino en la escritura de mujeres chilenas, Santiago, Editorial Cuarto Propio: Corporación de Desarrollo de la Mujer La Morada, 1998 ISBN 9562601102
- Escrituras de la diferencia sexual, Santiago de Chile, LOM Eds.: La Morada, 2000 ISBN 9562822478
- El género en apuros: discursos públicos: Cuarta Conferencia Mundial de la Mujer, compiled with Olga Grau and Francisca Pérez, Santiago de Chile, LOM Eds.: La Morada, 2000 ISBN 9562822443
- Volver a la memoria, co-edited with Olga Grau, Santiago de Chile, LOM Eds.: La Morada, 2001 ISBN 9562823687
- Cruce de lenguas, Sexualidades diversidad y ciudadanía, Santiago de Chile, LOM Eds.: Universidad Academia de Humanismo Cristiano, 2007 ISBN 9562828646
- Como traje de fiesta, Santiago de Chile, Editorial Universidad de Santiago de Chile, 2009 ISBN 9789563030747
- Julieta Kirkwood. Tengo ganas de ser nuestros nombres, Santiago de Chile, Editorial Universidad de Santiago de Chile, 2010

== See also ==
- List of Guggenheim Fellowships awarded in 2000
