= St. Ignatius El Bosque =

- Spanish: Colegio San Ignacio El Bosque
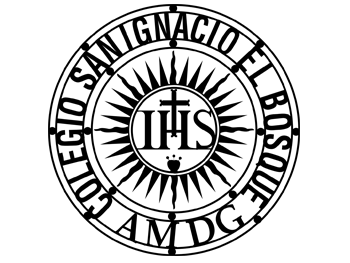

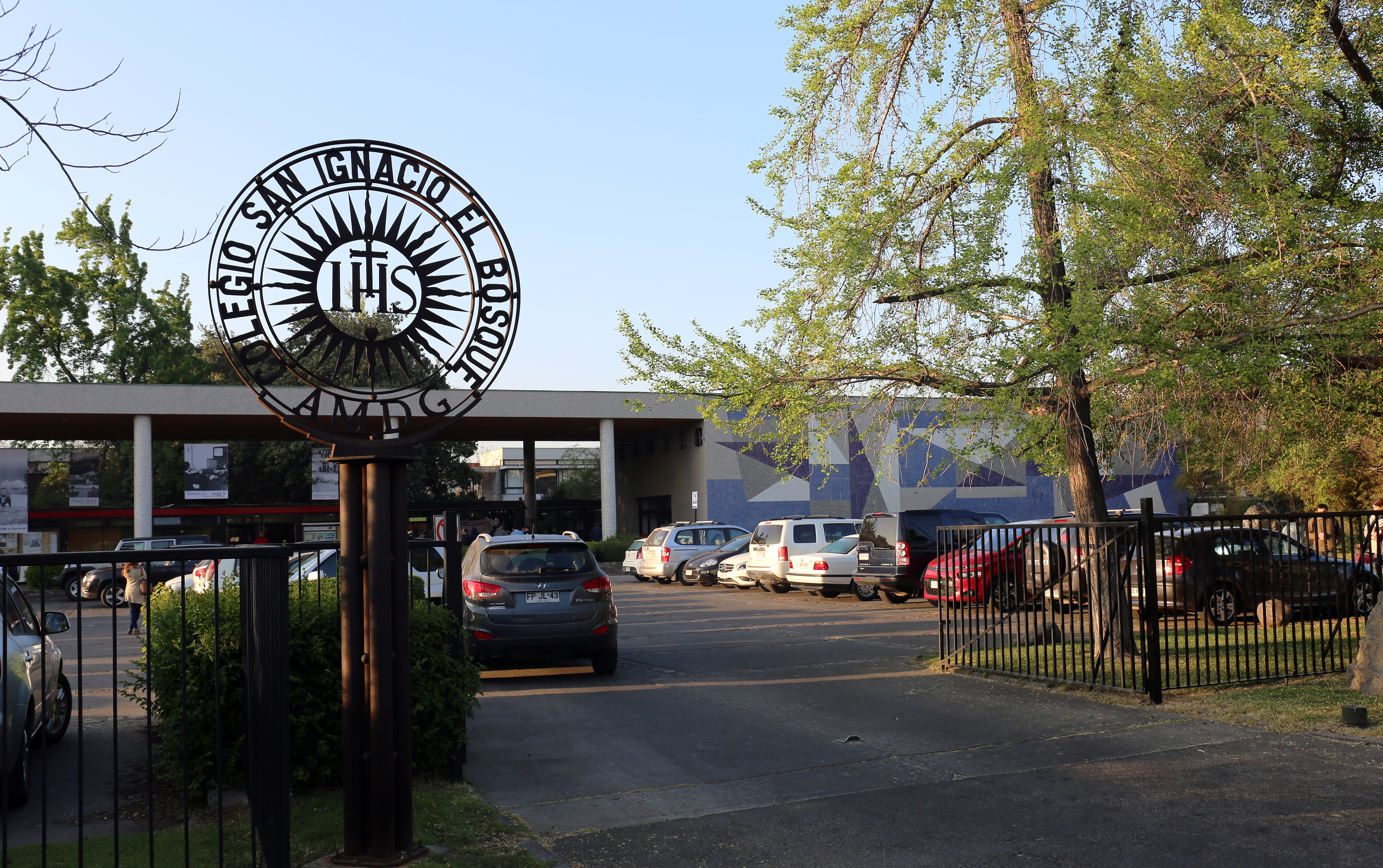
- St. Ignatius El Bosque School from Pocuro Ave

Location
- 2801 Pocuro Avenue; Santiago, Santiago Metropolitan Region 510746; Chile
- Coordinates: 33°26′00″S 70°35′38″W

Information
- Other name: SIEB
- Type: Private primary and secondary school
- Motto: Latin: Ad maiorem Dei gloriam (For the greater glory of God)
- Religious affiliation: Catholicism
- Denomination: Jesuit
- Patron saint: Ignatius Loyola
- Established: 1956; 70 years ago
- Administrator: Red Educacional Ignaciana
- Rector: Jorge Radic Henrici
- Principal: Jorge Radic Henrici
- Staff: ≈ 1,000
- Grades: PK - 12
- Gender: Boys: 1956 – 2013; Co-educational: since 2014
- Enrollment: 2,000
- Campus: Providencia
- Campus size: 7.7539 hectares (19.160 acres)
- Colors: Yellow, red, and white
- Slogan: Spanish: Entramos para aprender, salimos para servir (English: We go in to learn, we go out to serve)
- Song: "St. Ignatius School Anthem"
- Athletics: Atletismo SIEB
- Sports: Soccer, athletics, basketball, volleyball
- Mascot: Little devil
- Nickname: Devils
- Affiliations: Latin American Federation of the Society of Jesus; Ignatian Educational Network
- Website: www.sanignacio.cl

St. Ignatius El Bosque (Spanish: Colegio San Ignacio El Bosque; abbreviated as SIEB) is a private Catholic primary and secondary, located in the Providencia district of Santiago, Chile. The school was founded by the Society of Jesus in 1956 and is affiliated with the Latin American Federation of the Society of Jesus (FLACSI), and the site is the headquarters of the Ignatian Educational Network (REI).

== History ==
In 1931 the Society of Jesus acquired ten blocks of land in the Providencia district, intending to build a stadium for the already existent St. Ignatius Alonso Ovalle School (that was located in downtown Santiago). During the construction of the stadium, the idea of building a modern boarding school came out. On 8 December 1935 they put the first “brick” of the new boarding school with authorities participation. In 1936 the stadium was opened.

The Lecaros Building (boarding school) was on the final stage of construction when the boarding school project was canceled by St. Ignatius Alonso Ovalle School in 1954.

Due to the advanced construction, the idea of taking the preparatory courses to the new building was purposed.

On the Centenary year of the original school, on 3 October 1956, they open the new “Pocuro Building”. Later the secondary school became St. Ignatius El Bosque School

At that moment already 400 students of primary school were using the new building in charge of Hermanas del Amor Misericordioso.

During 1960 the provincial Church decides to completely separate the two campuses in totally different schools, meanwhile, the school keeps growing so a new building is under construction. At first, the name of the new campus was supposed to be “ St. Luis Gonzaga School” but due to legal problems and the already stable reputation of the old name they kept using it but changing the name of the streets were they are located. The same year, a lot of students of downtown moved to the new campus.

In 1964 the Prefect father José Francisco Arrau decided to build a cafeteria and end the track field

During the late 1990 and early 2000, the original school project was complete after building the Gym, and the 11th and 12th graders building.

On 2014 and 2017 two new buildings were done, the first one being the art pavilion with modern architecture, and the second, the new kindergarten building continuing with the original architecture of the school

In 2018 minor fixing and constructions were made on the Lecaros Building, adding an elevator and a new stair system.

== Administration ==
Since the separation of both schools, St. Ignatius El Bosque School was directed by only Jesuits priests until 2016 when Fr. Ismael Aracena S.J. left. The principal, director, and rector is Jorge Radich Hernici, a lay person and alumnus.

== Notable alumni ==
- Rafael Araneda
- Joaquín Barañao
- Benito Baranda
- Juan Barros Madrid
- Felipe Berríos
- Jorge Burgos
- Felipe Camiroaga
- Gonzalo Cornejo
- Sergio Espejo
- Gonzalo García Pino
- Francisco López Amenábar
- Alfredo Moreno Charme
- Felipe Seymour
- Raimundo Tupper
- Francisco Undurraga
- Alberto Undurraga
- José Miguel Viñuela
- Antonio Walker
- Keko Yunge

== See also ==
- Catholic Church in Chile
- Education in Chile
- List of Jesuit schools
