= Tati Penna =

Chilean singer (1960–2021)

- Born: Constanza Bernardita Penna Brüggemann; 26 February 1960; Concepción, Chile
- Died: 14 April 2021 (aged 61); Santiago, Chile
- Years active: 1978–2018
- Spouse: Jaime de Aguirre (1991–1997)

Constanza Bernardita Penna Brüggemann, better known as Tati Penna (26 February 1960 – 14 April 2021), was a Chilean singer, journalist, radio announcer and television presenter. She was prominent in various areas of communications, and in a podcast commemorating Chilevisión shortly before her death she was described as one of the first feminists on Chilean television.

== Musical career ==
In 1979, she began singing with the group Abril. With this group, she performed at the Viña del Mar International Song Festival in 1982, the same year they released their album Abril.

In 1984, after the dissolution of Abril, she continued her solo career, frequenting the Café del Cerro circle, and recorded the album Tati Penna in 1988, with songs composed by her. She also collaborated on the album Voces sin fronteras, made within the framework of the visit of John Paul II to Chile in 1987, where she recorded the song "La verdad" with Roque Narvaja.

In 1988 she recorded the song "No lo quiero No, No" for the No campaign in the national plebiscite, alongside Cecilia Echeñique, Isabel, Javiera and Tita Parra. She also performed at the closing of the campaign on 1 October of that year, in a massive event held on the Pan-American Highway South. Years later she had a brief appearance in the film No (2012) by Pablo Larraín , where she recreated her participation in the campaign alongside other figures of the time.

Since the 1990s, Penna postponed her musical career in favour of her work in the media, although she subsequently recorded two albums, including a tango album released in 2002 under the Macondo label.

== Journalistic career ==
She studied journalism at the Pontifical Catholic University of Chile and worked for the magazines Clan and Pluma y Pincel, Radio Carrera, and the Latin American Studies Corporation (Cieplan).

In July 1990, she took over as host of Channel 11 at the University of Chile's television station, replacing journalist Susana Horno. She later hosted the channel's morning show, alongside Juan La Rivera and Felipe Camiroaga. Penna and Camiroaga were later hired by Televisión Nacional de Chile (TVN), where they became the first hosts of the morning show Buenos Días a Todos in 1992.

In 1993 she returned to Channel 11, then known as RTU and later Chilevisión, where she worked as a journalist and host of various programs, including Embrujada (or The 12 of the Zodiac), Línea de fuego, La guerra de los sexos, De vez en cuando la vida, Nada personal, Escrúpulos and Fuego cruzado. In 1993, Scrupulos won an Apes Award for "Best Talk or Debate Program", while Penna received the Apes for "Best Host" in 1998.

In 2002 she returned to TVN to present the program Con mucho cariño, a talk show broadcast during the 2002 FIFA World Cup, in which she collaborated again with Felipe Camiroaga, as well as Myriam Hernández and Mauricio Bustamante. In 2006 she participated as an advocate in Chile elige and in 2008 she was an advocate for Violeta Parra in the program Grandes chilenos, hosted by journalist Consuelo Saavedra. Also in 2009 she participated as a judge in the program Todos a coro hosted by Rafael Araneda and Karen Doggenweiler. Her last work in television was the conduction of Sin Dios ni late between April 2011 and February 2012.

In print media, she conducted numerous interviews with the weekly Siete + 7. She also taught at Andrés Bello National University.

Penna was chosen as the most outstanding woman of 2001 by citizens who cast their votes on the website of the Ministry General Secretariat of Government. She received an award from the Santiago de Chile City Hall, the División de Organizaciones Sociales, the National Women's Service, and the French Embassy.

In November 2014, she joined the National Television Council as a public relations officer. Later, in 2016, she assumed the role of head of management and administration of the Department of Audiovisual Promotion. She was dismissed in September 2018, when Catalina Parot was president of the Council, giving as a reason the excessive sick leave that Penna requested, due to the multiple sclerosis she suffered from.

== Personal life ==
She married musician and businessman Jaime de Aguirre, with whom she had two children. She later married musician Claudio Nicholls.

== Death ==
In 2014 she was diagnosed with multiple sclerosis, which kept her away from the media. This disease was compounded by chest cancer, diagnosed in early 2021, which caused her death on 14 April 2021.

== Discography ==
=== With Abril ===
- Abril (1982)

=== Solo ===
- Tati Penna (1988)
- Tangos (2002)
- Sofá (2015)

==== Collaborations ====
- Voces sin fronteras (1987)
- Chile, la alegría ya viene (1988)

== Filmography ==
=== Television ===
Año	Programa	Rol	Canal
1990–1991	Canal 11 al despertar	Presenter	Canal 11 U. De Chile / RTU
1991	Matinal 91	Presenter	Canal 11 U. De Chile / RTU
1992	Buenos Días a Todos	Presenter	TVN
1992–1997	Embrujada	Presenter	Chilevisión
1992	Línea de fuego	Presenter	Chilevisión
1993–2001	Escrúpulos	Presenter	Chilevisión
1994	Nada personal	Presenter	Chilevisión
1996–1998	La guerra de los sexos	Presenter	Chilevisión
1997	Fuego cruzado	Presenter	Chilevisión
2000	De vez en cuando... la vida	Presenter	Chilevisión
2002–2003	Con mucho cariño	Presenter	TVN
2006	Chile elige	Panelist	TVN
2008	Grandes chilenos	Panelist	TVN
2009	Todos a coro	Judge	TVN
2011	Festival del Huaso de Olmué	Judge	Chilevisión
2011–2012	Sin Dios ni late	Presenter	Zona Latina
2012–2013	Mentiras Verdaderas	Panelist	La Red
