= Alejandra Pérez Lecaros =

Chilean politician and lawyer

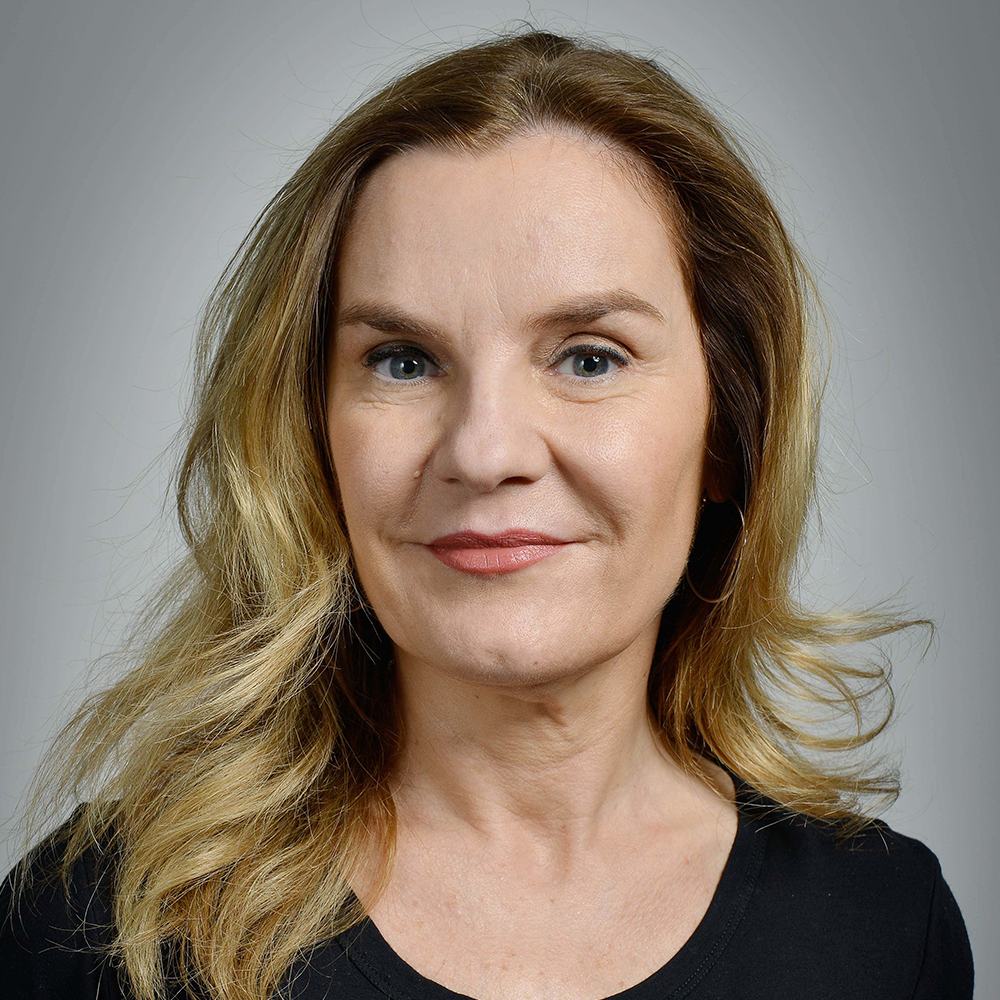
- Official portrait (2020)

Ministry of Cultures, Arts and Heritage
- In office 11 March 2018 – 9 August 2018
- President: Sebastián Piñera
- Preceded by: Ernesto Ottone
- Succeeded by: Mauricio Rojas

Personal details
- Born: 11 January 1963 (age 63) Santiago, Chile
- Spouse: Cristián Bofill
- Children: Four
- Parent(s): Alfredo Pérez Sánchez; María de los Ángeles Lecaros
- Education: Pontifical Catholic University of Chile (BA)
- Occupation: Politician
- Profession: Journalist

Alejandra Pérez Lecaros (born 11 January 1963) is a Chilean politician who served as minister during Sebastián Piñera's second government.

She worked at Canal 13, where she served as Communications and Marketing Manager (2010–2014), Deputy Executive Director (2014–2016), Executive Director (2016), and Chair of the Board.

== Biography ==
=== Family and personal life ===
She is the middle sister in a conservative family. Her father, Alfredo Pérez Sánchez, is a gynecologist who founded the maternity ward of the Clinical Hospital of the Pontifical Catholic University of Chile, and her mother, María de Los Ángeles Lecaros (d. 2014), was a pianist and painter who introduced her family to the world of culture. There she developed an appreciation for opera, the piano, and ballet.

She has been separated since 2012 and has four children: Rodrigo, Alejandra, Ignacio and Matías.

=== Education ===
She completed her secondary education at Colegio Villa María. She holds a bachelor's degree in communications from the Pontifical Catholic University of Chile and a diploma in communications and journalism from the University of Navarra (Spain).

== Professional career ==
She was editor of Diners Club and Master Club magazines (1987–1995) and director of Fibra, the magazine of Telefónica Chile, between 2002 and 2005.

In the public sector, she was advisor to the president of Codelco, José Pablo Arellano (2006–2007), and Director of Communications at the Ministry of Transport and Telecommunications during the tenure of René Cortázar (2007–2010), both positions held during the first presidency of Michelle Bachelet. In 2010, she served as communications advisor to the Minister of Housing and Urbanism, Magdalena Matte, during the first presidency of Sebastián Piñera.

She was Public Affairs and Institutional Relations Manager at Telefónica CTC Chile from 2001 to 2007, working closely with Board Chairman Bruno Philippi and Chief Executive Officer Claudio Muñoz. She was also an advisor to the Sociedad de Fomento Fabril (SOFOFA) between 2005 and 2011 and has taught journalism, communication, and crisis strategy at the Finis Terrae University, Gabriela Mistral University, Universidad del Desarrollo, and University of the Andes.

She currently serves as director of the Corporación Educacional Aprender, teaches in the Diploma in Strategic Communication at the University of the Andes, and works as a corporate communications consultant.
