= Teresa Gazitúa =

Chilean artist and writer

Teresa Gazitúa (born December 14, 1941) is a Chilean artist and writer. Gazitúa was born in Santiago, Chile. In 1967 she earned her title of Professor of Fine Arts and graduated in 1968 with her Bachelor of Arts, majoring in painting, from the Catholic University of Chile. She has worked as Professor of Art at the University of Chile and the Catholic University of Chile.

Gazitúa is a printmaker and a papermaker. She was one of the first Chilean artists to research and create paper using natural fiber. She finds influence in the natural environment. Smooth rocks from the Maipo River serves as one natural influence in her work. Her work is held in the collections of the Essex Collection of Art from Latin America. In 2010 she was nominated for an Altazor Award.
