= Corporación de Desarrollo de la Mujer La Morada =

Chilean non-governmental organization

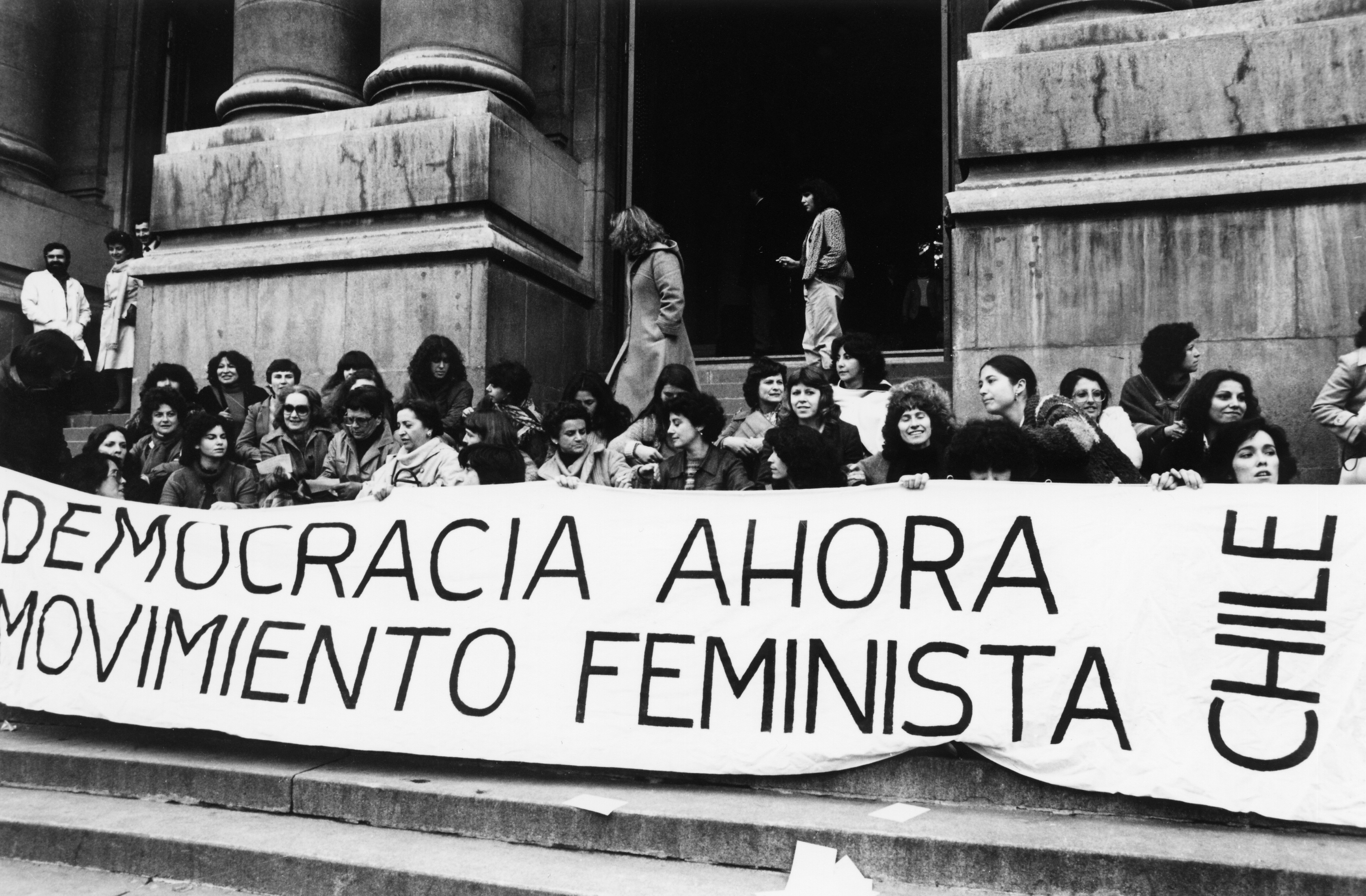
Feminists at an anti-Pinochet protest

Corporación de Desarrollo de la Mujer La Morada (La Morada Women's Development Corporation), also known as Casa de la Mujer La Morada, or simply La Morada, is a Chilean non-profit, non-governmental organization (NGO) based in Santiago, that works to expand women's rights through political participation, education, culture and efforts to eradicate violence.

== History ==
The corporation was founded by Julieta Kirkwood and Margarita Pisano in 1983, in the context of the feminist and women's movement during Chile's military dictatorship (1973–1990), when the Círculo de Estudios de la Mujer split into two projects: the research-oriented Centro de Estudios de la Mujer (CEM) and the Casa de la Mujer La Morada, which focused on the political activism of the women's movement. The first meeting was held outside the Chilean National Library. There, several workshops, lectures, debates and meetings were held, attended mainly by middle-class professional women, including Julieta Kirkwood, Margarita Pisano, Eliana Largo, María Antonieta Saa, Raquel Olea, Vicky Quevedo and Verónica Matus.

== Boletín La Morada ==
The Boletín La Morada, a free newsletter, was published for about two years (1986-1987) by the corporation, mainly conceived as a vehicle to publicize the events taking place at the Casa and to provide information on the workshops, book launches, seminars and exhibitions.

== Radio Tierra ==
In 1991, La Morada founded an emblematic communication project with Radio Tierra, the first feminist radio station in Chile, managed and operated solely by women. It addressed topics that were not covered by traditional media such as feminism, sexual diversity, sexual and reproductive rights, and literature, among others. Radio Tierra stopped broadcasting from its radio frequency in September 2013 and since 2019 it has been operating in digital format via the Internet.
