= Grandes Chilenos de Nuestra Historia =

Grandes Chilenos de Nuestra Historia (English: Great Chileans of Our History; sometimes simply called Grandes Chilenos) is a Chilean TV program, produced and broadcast by state channel Televisión Nacional de Chile during 2008. It was based on the style of BBC's 100 Greatest Britons. Former President Salvador Allende was elected the "Greatest Chilean". The exclusion of some personalities, most notably founding father Bernardo O'Higgins, caused controversy.

== Top 10 ==
1. Salvador Allende (1908–1973), 38.80 percent of the votes, physician and politician, 28th President.
2. Arturo Prat (1848–1879), war hero, 38.44 percent.
3. Saint Alberto Hurtado (1901–1952), 7.97 percent, a Jesuit priest canonised by Pope Benedict XVI in 2005.
4. Víctor Jara (1932–1973), folk singer and songwriter.
5. Manuel Rodríguez (1785–1818), General.
6. José Miguel Carrera (1785–1821), General.
7. Lautaro (1535–1557), Mapuche warrior.
8. Gabriela Mistral (1889–1957) Nobel Prize for Literature.
9. Pablo Neruda (1904–1973), Nobel Prize for Literature.
10. Violeta Parra (1917–1967), singer and songwriter.

== See also ==
- Greatest Britons spin-offs
