= Ministry of Cultures, Arts and Heritage (Chile) =

Government ministry of Chile

- Ministerio de las Culturas, las Artes y el Patrimonio
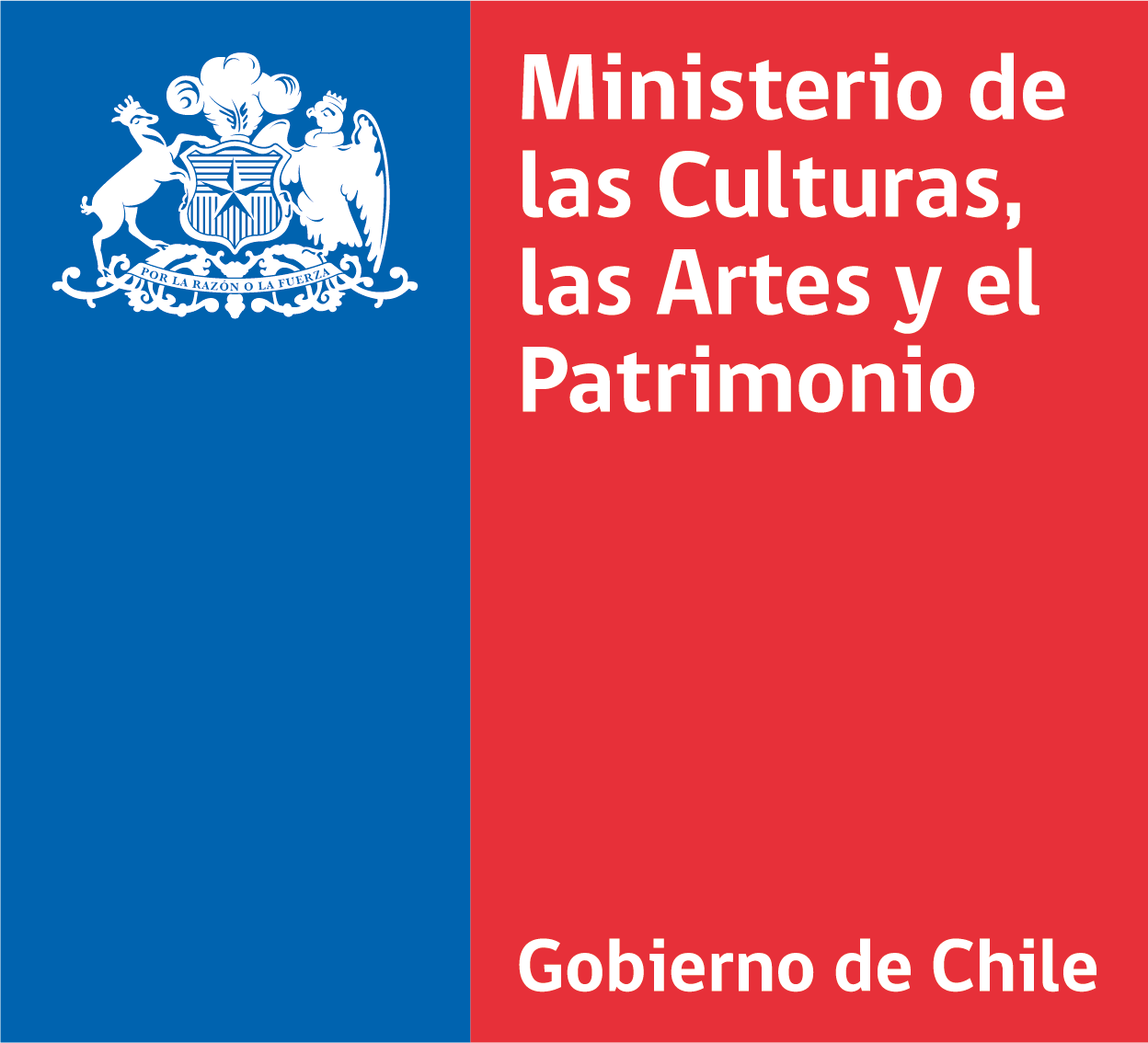

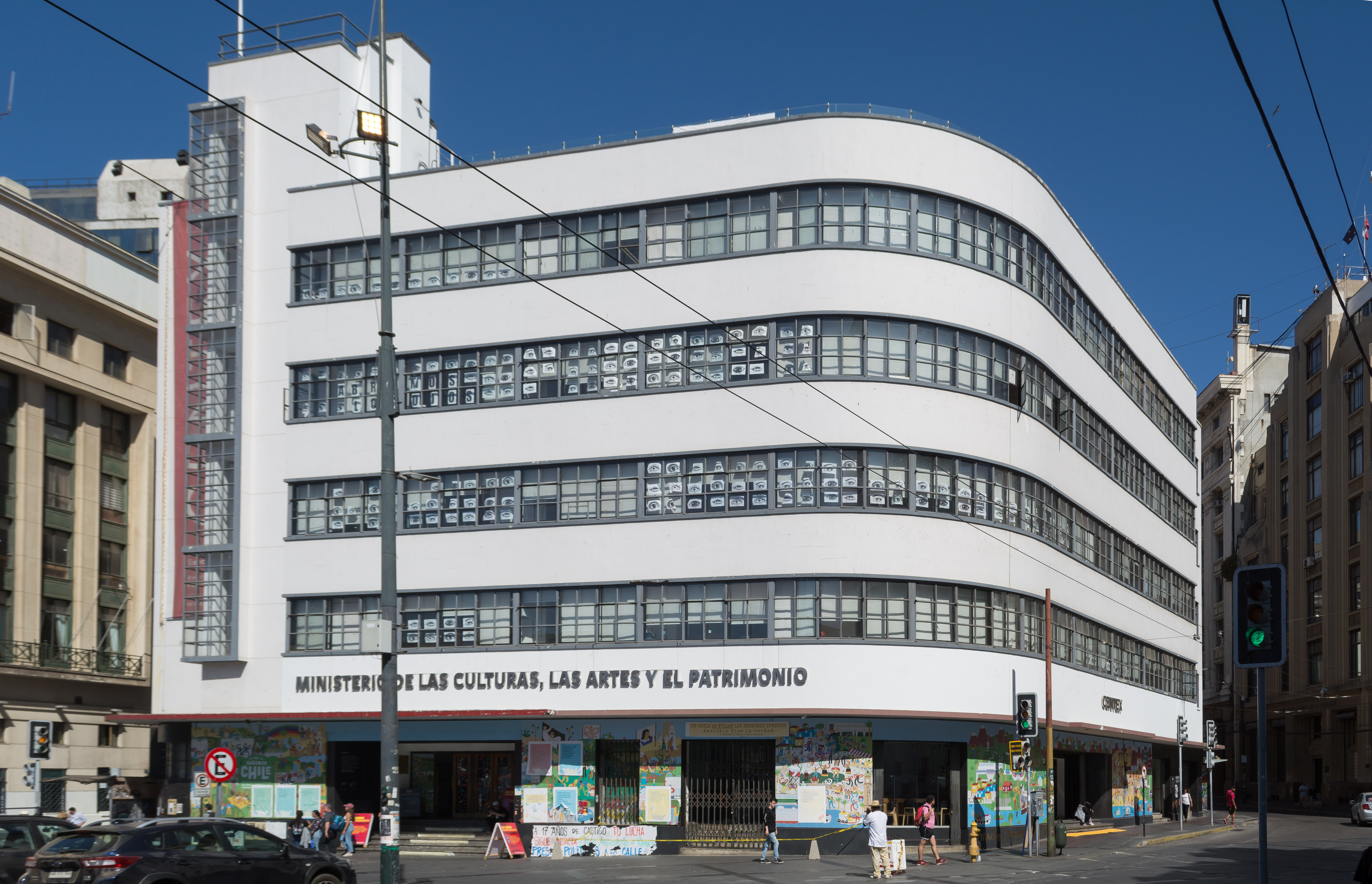
- Ministry headquarters in Valparaíso.

Agency overview
- Formed: 1 March 2018
- Preceding agency: National Council of Culture and the Arts (2003–2018)
- Type: Ministry
- Jurisdiction: Government of Chile
- Headquarters: Sotomayor Square, Valparaíso
- Employees: 2 018 (2018)
- Annual budget: 198 193 425 miles de CLP (2020)
- Ministers responsible: Francisco Undurraga, Minister of Cultures, Arts and Heritage; Carlos Lobos Mosqueira, Undersecretary of Cultures and Arts; Emilio de la Cerda, Undersecretary of Cultural Heritage
- Website: cultura.gob.cl (in Spanish)

The Ministry of Cultures, Arts and Heritage (Spanish: Ministerio de las Culturas, las Artes y el Patrimonio) is the government ministry of Chile responsible for the design, formulation, and implementation of cultural policies, plans and programs.

Its main headquarters are located in Valparaíso. It is the only Chilean government mnistry whose national offices are not based in Santiago.

== HIstory ==
It was created by Law 21045, promulgated on 13 October 2017 and published in the Official Gazette on 3 November of the same year. The Ministry began its functions on 1 March 2018, being the legal successor – through its two undersecretaries: the Undersecretariat of Cultures and the Arts and the Undersecretariat of Cultural Heritage — of the National Council of Culture and the Arts, an institution created in 2003 and dependent on the Ministry of Education (Mineduc).

== List of ministers ==
Picture	Name	Entered office	Exited office	Notes	Appointed by
	Ernesto Ottone	1 March 2018	11 March 2018	Ind.	Michelle Bachelet
	Alejandra Pérez Lecaros	11 March 2018	9 August 2018	Ind.	Sebastián Piñera
	Mauricio Rojas	9 August 2018	13 August 2018	Ind.	Sebastián Piñera
	Consuelo Valdés	13 March 2018	11 March 2022	Ind.	Sebastián Piñera
	Julieta Brodsky	11 March 2022	10 March 2023	CS	Gabriel Boric
	Jaime de Aguirre	10 March 2023	16 August 2023	Ind.	Gabriel Boric
	Carolina Arredondo	16 August 2023	11 March 2026	Ind.	Gabriel Boric
	Francisco Undurraga	11 March 2026	Incumbent	Evópoli	José Antonio Kast
