= Alejandra Pérez Espina =

Chilean political activist

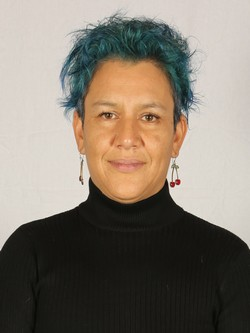

Member of the Constitutional Convention
- In office 4 July 2021 – 4 July 2022
- Constituency: 9th District

Personal details
- Born: 25 October 1977 (age 48) Santiago, Chile
- Other political affiliations: The List of the People
- Occupation: Political activist
- Profession: Lawyer

Alejandra Pérez Espina (born 25 October 1977) is a Chilean activist and independent politician.

She served as a member of the Constitutional Convention, representing the 9th electoral district of the Santiago Metropolitan Region.

== Biography ==
Pérez Espina was born on 25 October 1977 in Santiago. She is the daughter of Edgardo Pérez Fuente and Ana Espina Beltrán. She is married to Andrés Girón González.

Pérez completed her secondary education at Liceo Guillermo Labarca Hubertson in Quinta Normal, Santiago.

She has worked within her household performing domestic and caregiving tasks.

== Political career ==
During the 2019 social unrest in Chile, she engaged in protest activism, using her body as a canvas to raise awareness and express solidarity with people living with cancer, advocating for access to quality healthcare.

She also participated in the organization of community soup kitchens (ollas comunes).

In the elections held on 15–16 May 2021, she ran as an independent candidate for the Constitutional Convention representing the 9th electoral district of the Metropolitan Region as part of the Lista del Pueblo electoral pact, receiving 18,002 votes (5.68% of the validly cast votes).

In July 2022, she began working with the Communal Planning Secretariat (SECPLA) of Valparaíso, supporting the updating of information on social organizations, advising on the generation of territorially relevant information, and assisting in the updating of community-oriented plans within the framework of an integrated territorial planning program with a participatory and human rights approach.
