= Universidad Mayor =

Coordinates: 33.4212°S 70.6049°W

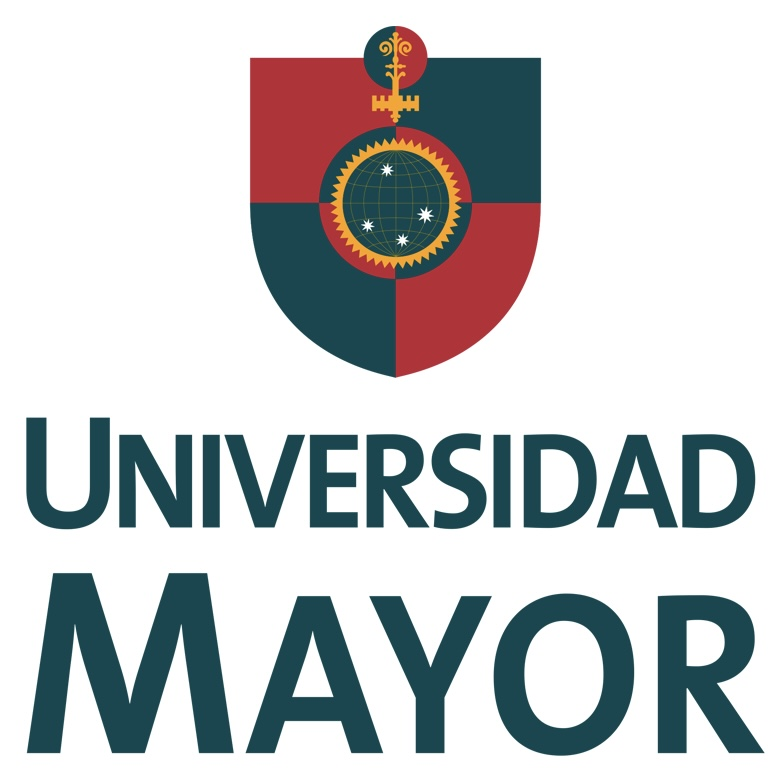
- Motto: Para Espíritus Emprendedores
- Motto in English: For Entrepreneurial Spirits
- Type: Private
- Established: 1988
- Affiliations: Middle States Commission for Higher Education
- Chairman: Ricardo García
- Rector: Rubén Covarrubias Giordano
- Academic staff: 2,972
- Students: 18,896
- Undergraduates: 16,554
- Postgraduates: 2,432
- Location: Santiago, Chile
- Campus: Santiago, Temuco
- Website: www.umayor.cl

Universidad Mayor is a private university in Santiago, Chile. It was founded in 1988 and is accredited by the United States Middle States Commission on Higher Education (MSCHE).

== Foundation, growth and development (1988-2015) ==
Universidad Mayor opened its first academic programs in 1988 with bachelor's degrees in Architecture and Engineering with 3 majors; Industrial Engineering, Computer Science and Electronics Engineering which were offered at its main campus in Américo Vespucio. Within a few years, Universidad Mayor became the first private university in Chile to offer Agronomy and Forest Engineering (1989), Veterinary Medicine (1991), Dentistry (1997) and a Medical Residency Program (1998).
