= Viña Undurraga =

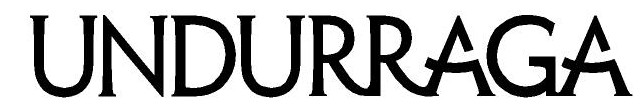

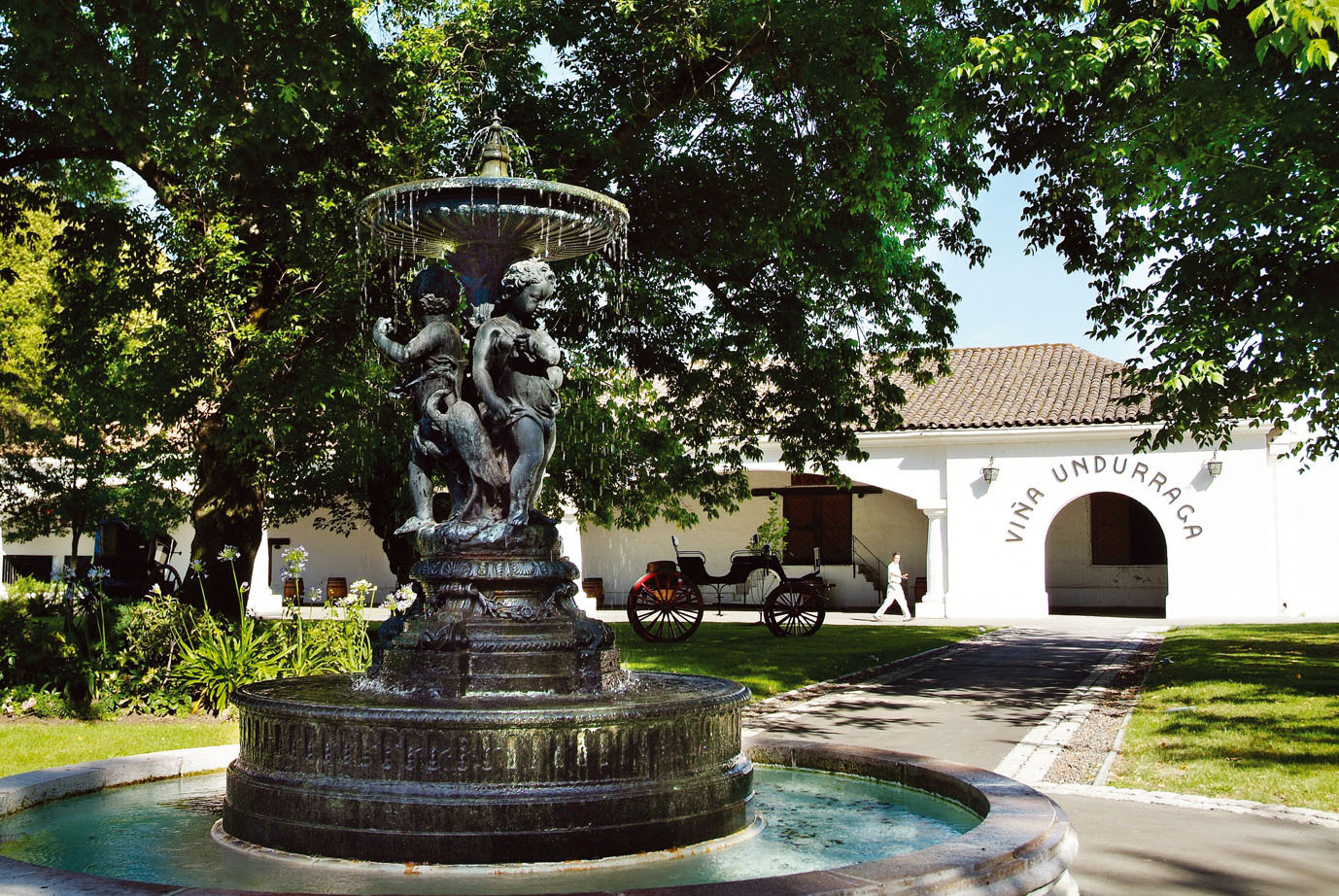
- Location: Talagante, Chile
- Appellation: Maipo Valley
- Founded: 1885 (140–141 years ago)
- Key people: Founder: Francisco Undurraga Vicuña; President: Mauricio Picciotto Kassin
- Area cultivated: 4200
- Cases/yr: 1,500,000
- Website: undurraga.cl

Viña Undurraga is a wines and sparkling wines producer, located in Talagante, Maipo Valley, 34 km from Santiago de Chile. It is one of the oldest wineries in the country, founded in 1885. The company has a total of 1,700 hectares of vineyards, distributed in the valleys of Maipo, Rapel, Leyda, and Maule; exports 75% of its wine production. In 2016 it projected annual sales of 1.5 million cases of wine.

== Awards and honours ==
National:

- Vineyard of the year, in 2012, according to the Association Wines of Chile.

International:

- Producer of the year, at the 2013 SWA Merchant Awards, awarded by the Sommelier Wine Awards.
- Included in the top 100 wineries of the year, in 2012, 2013 and 2016, by Wine & Spirits magazine.

== Central winery ==
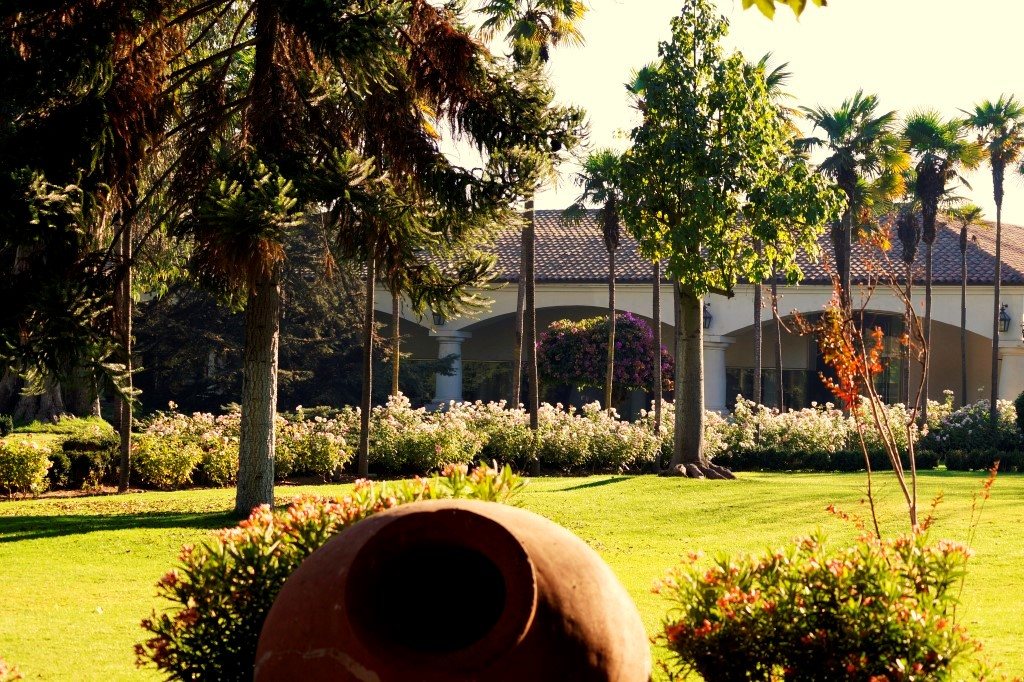
Patronal house of Viña Undurraga.

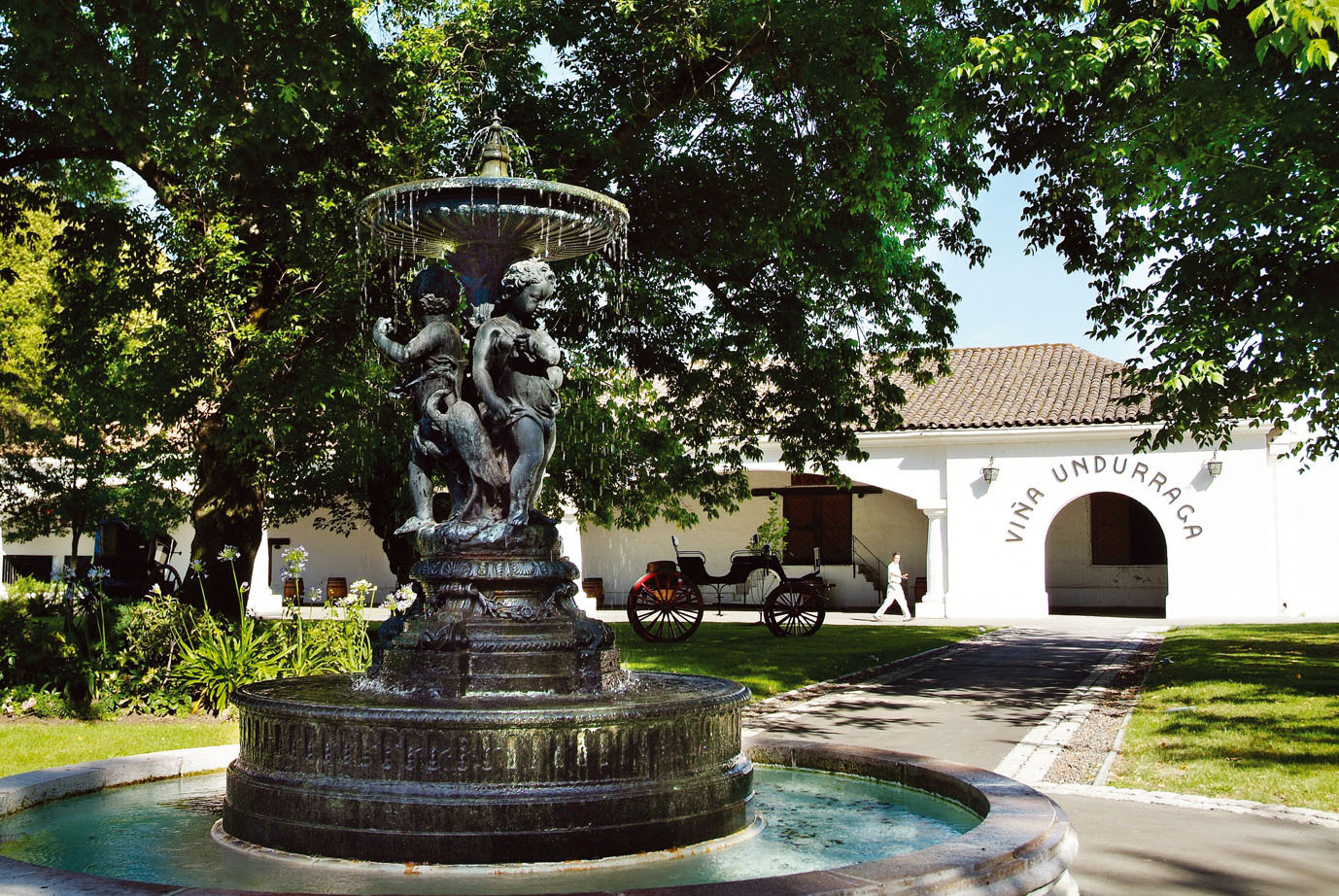
Water fountain of the patronal house.

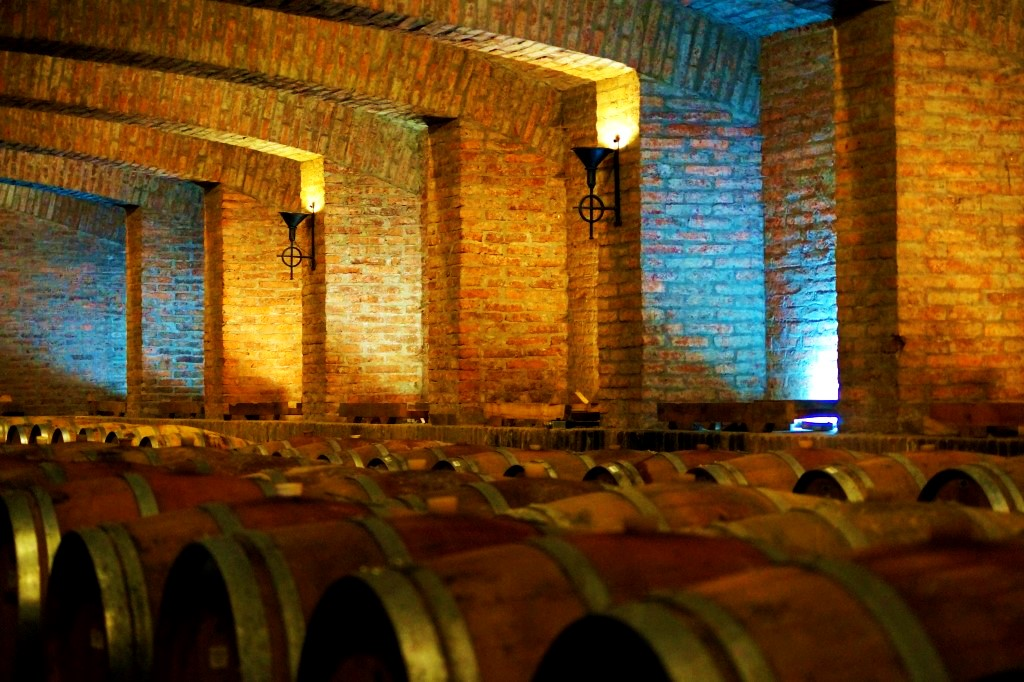
Undurraga winery in Fundo Santa Ana, Talagante.

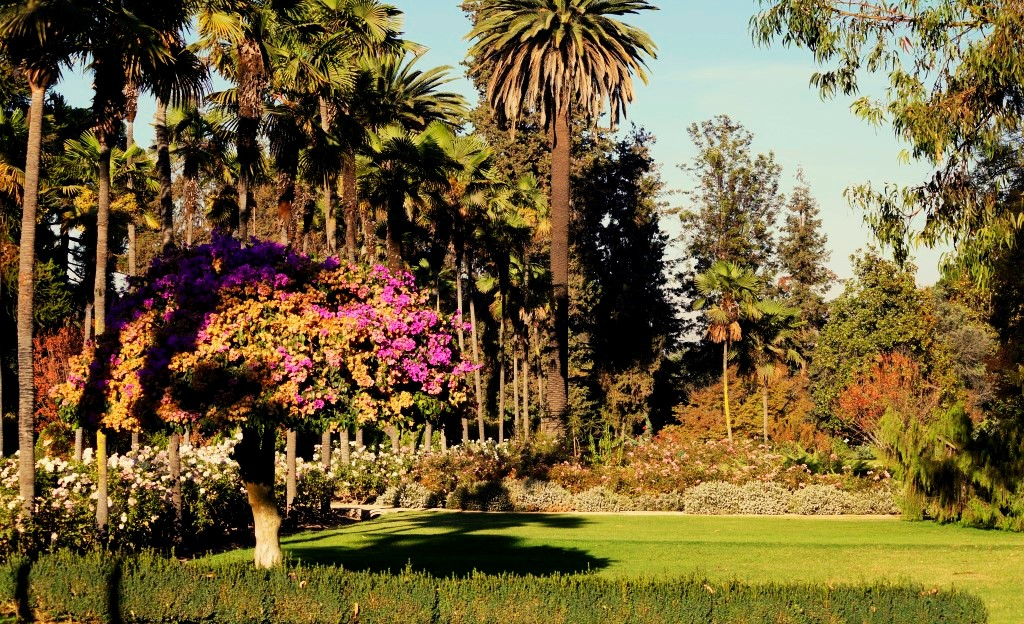
Vineyard's park, designed by George Henri Dubois.

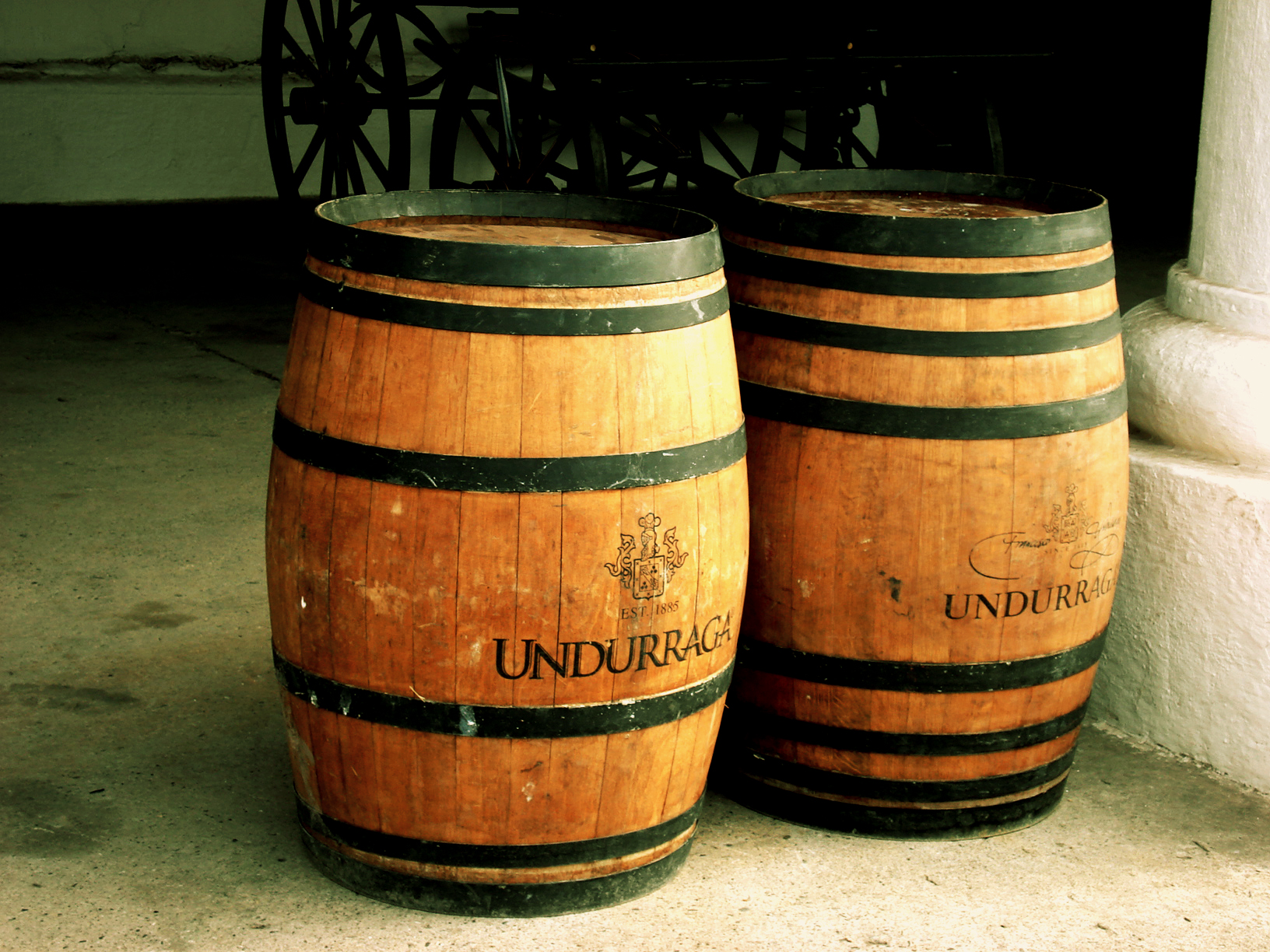
Wine barrel of Viña Undurraga.
