= Latin American Federation of the Society of Jesus =

Coordinates: 4°35′49.29″N 74°4′32.84″W

- Abbreviation: FLACSI
- Established: 2001; 25 years ago
- Type: Jesuit, Catholic
- Location: Plaza de Bolívar, Bogotá, Colombia
- Region served: Latin America, Caribbean, Florida
- Founder: Peter Hans Kolvenbach
- Administrator: Hugo Moreno Rojas
- Affiliations: Jesuit, Catholic
- Website: FLACSI

Latin American Federation of the Society of Jesus (FLACSI) promotes the network of schools and organizations of the Society of Jesus in the Latin America and Caribbean area.

== Related organizations ==
- Fe y Alegría
- Association of Universities Entrusted to the Society of Jesus in Latin America
- Pontifical Xavierian University
- Alberto Hurtado University
