= District 11 (Chamber of Deputies of Chile) =

Electoral district of the Chamber of Deputies of Chile

- Distrito 11
- Electoral District for the Chamber of Deputies
- Location of District 11 within Chile
- Commune: List: La Reina; Las Condes; Lo Barnechea; Peñalolén; Vitacura
- Region: Santiago
- Population: 820,441 (2017)
- Electorate: 762,026 (2021)
- Area: 1,229 km^{2} (2020)

Current Electoral District
- Created: 2017
- Seats: 6 (2017–present)
- Deputies: List: Cristián Araya (REP); Gonzalo de la Carrera (Ind); Tomás Hirsch (PAH); Guillermo Ramírez (UDI); Catalina del Real (Ind); Francisco Undurraga (EVO)

District 11 (Spanish: Distrito 11) is one of the 28 multi-member electoral districts of the Chamber of Deputies, the lower house of the National Congress, the national legislature of Chile. The district was created by the 2015 electoral reform and came into being at the following general election in 2017. It consists of the communes of La Reina, Las Condes, Lo Barnechea, Peñalolén and Vitacura in the region of Santiago. The district currently elects six of the 155 members of the Chamber of Deputies using the open party-list proportional representation electoral system. At the 2021 general election the district had 762,026 registered electors.

== Electoral system ==
District 11 currently elects six of the 155 members of the Chamber of Deputies using the open party-list proportional representation electoral system. Parties may form electoral pacts with each other to pool their votes and increase their chances of winning seats. However, the number of candidates nominated by an electoral pact may not exceed the maximum number of candidates that a single party may nominate. Seats are allocated using the D'Hondt method.

== Election results ==
=== Summary ===
Election	Apruebo Dignidad AD / FA			Green Ecologists PEV			Dignidad Ahora DA			New Social Pact NPS / NM			Democratic Convergence CD			Chile Vamos Podemos / Vamos			Party of the People PDG			Christian Social Front FSC		
Election	Votes	%	Seats	Votes	%	Seats	Votes	%	Seats	Votes	%	Seats	Votes	%	Seats	Votes	%	Seats	Votes	%	Seats	Votes	%	Seats
2021	78,155	18.92%	1	16,185	3.92%	0	11,392	2.76%	0	27,768	6.72%	0				169,692	41.08%	3	12,211	2.96%	0	87,986	21.30%	2
2017	63,942	16.98%	1							41,036	10.90%	0	24,854	6.60%	0	237,460	63.05%	5						

=== Detailed ===
==== 2021 ====
Results of the 2021 general election held on 21 November 2021:

Party		Pact	Party								Pact		
Party		Pact	Votes per commune					Total votes	%	Seats	Votes	%	Seats
Party		Pact	La Reina	Las Condes	Lo Bar- nechea	Peña- lolén	Vita- cura	Total votes	%	Seats	Votes	%	Seats
Evópoli	EVO	Chile Podemos +	5,371	28,150	10,488	2,998	13,152	60,159	14.56%	1	169,692	41.08%	3
National Renewal	RN	Chile Podemos +	8,213	24,275	6,724	9,822	8,311	57,345	13.88%	1	169,692	41.08%	3
Independent Democratic Union	UDI	Chile Podemos +	3,807	22,588	12,150	2,956	10,687	52,188	12.63%	1	169,692	41.08%	3
Republican Party	REP	Christian Social Front	8,512	41,726	11,735	9,571	16,442	87,986	21.30%	2	87,986	21.30%	2
Comunes	COM	Apruebo Dignidad	8,635	13,125	3,135	12,004	2,757	39,656	9.60%	1	78,155	18.92%	1
Democratic Revolution	RD	Apruebo Dignidad	3,085	3,748	486	14,130	740	22,189	5.37%	0	78,155	18.92%	1
Social Convergence	CS	Apruebo Dignidad	2,743	4,199	2,002	2,541	1,008	12,493	3.02%	0	78,155	18.92%	1
Communist Party of Chile	PC	Apruebo Dignidad	770	731	145	2,049	122	3,817	0.92%	0	78,155	18.92%	1
Christian Democratic Party	PDC	New Social Pact	2,690	7,210	733	3,114	1,474	15,221	3.68%	0	27,768	6.72%	0
Citizens	CIU	New Social Pact	1,236	3,038	587	1,187	1,606	7,654	1.85%	0	27,768	6.72%	0
Party for Democracy	PPD	New Social Pact	438	881	245	1,129	243	2,936	0.71%	0	27,768	6.72%	0
Liberal Party of Chile	PL	New Social Pact	391	700	129	540	197	1,957	0.47%	0	27,768	6.72%	0
Green Ecologist Party	PEV		2,720	5,337	1,141	5,823	1,164	16,185	3.92%	0	16,185	3.92%	0
Party of the People	PDG		1,458	2,484	1,028	6,883	358	12,211	2.96%	0	12,211	2.96%	0
Humanist Party	PH	Dignidad Ahora	1,084	1,509	507	3,463	305	6,868	1.66%	0	11,392	2.76%	0
Equality Party	IGUAL	Dignidad Ahora	642	793	260	2,677	152	4,524	1.10%	0	11,392	2.76%	0
United Centre	CU	United Independents	920	1,820	636	3,262	374	7,012	1.70%	0	7,012	1.70%	0
Progressive Party	PRO		296	550	178	1,530	124	2,678	0.65%	0	2,678	0.65%	0
Valid votes			53,011	162,864	52,309	85,679	59,216	413,079	100.00%	6	413,079	100.00%	6
Blank votes			2,242	5,361	1,626	5,213	1,484	15,926	3.61%				
Rejected votes – other			1,502	3,447	1,119	5,052	831	11,951	2.71%				
Total polled			56,755	171,672	55,054	95,944	61,531	440,956	60.74%				
Registered electors			90,939	271,386	84,259	190,640	88,802	726,026					
Turnout			62.41%	63.26%	65.34%	50.33%	69.29%	60.74%					

The following candidates were elected: Cristián Araya (REP), 16,706 votes; Gonzalo de la Carrera (REP), 46,069 votes; Tomás Hirsch (COM), 28,542 votes; Guillermo Ramírez (UDI), 40,442 votes; Catalina del Real (RN), 28,353 votes; and Francisco Undurraga (EVO), 43,625 votes.

==== 2017 ====
Results of the 2017 general election held on 19 November 2017:

Party		Pact	Party								Pact		
Party		Pact	Votes per commune					Total votes	%	Seats	Votes	%	Seats
Party		Pact	La Reina	Las Condes	Lo Bar- nechea	Peña- lolén	Vita- cura	Total votes	%	Seats	Votes	%	Seats
National Renewal	RN	Chile Vamos	14,227	47,315	14,506	16,269	18,193	110,510	29.34%	3	237,460	63.05%	5
Independent Democratic Union	UDI	Chile Vamos	5,725	31,101	10,227	7,780	13,451	68,284	18.13%	1	237,460	63.05%	5
Evópoli	EVO	Chile Vamos	4,715	27,675	9,726	3,084	13,466	58,666	15.58%	1	237,460	63.05%	5
Humanist Party	PH	Broad Front	5,437	7,860	1,466	9,553	1,962	26,278	6.98%	1	63,942	16.98%	1
Democratic Revolution	RD	Broad Front	5,221	8,310	1,270	7,858	1,637	24,296	6.45%	0	63,942	16.98%	1
Equality Party	IGUAL	Broad Front	820	1,223	1,050	3,968	222	7,283	1.93%	0	63,942	16.98%	1
Green Ecologist Party	PEV	Broad Front	1,026	2,338	424	1,670	627	6,085	1.62%	0	63,942	16.98%	1
Socialist Party of Chile	PS	Nueva Mayoría	5,141	6,955	1,109	6,201	2,187	21,593	5.73%	0	41,036	10.90%	0
Party for Democracy	PPD	Nueva Mayoría	3,080	3,823	993	7,813	1,070	16,779	4.46%	0	41,036	10.90%	0
Communist Party of Chile	PC	Nueva Mayoría	448	733	210	958	315	2,664	0.71%	0	41,036	10.90%	0
Christian Democratic Party	PDC	Democratic Convergence	3,380	6,659	1,555	10,922	2,338	24,854	6.60%	0	24,854	6.60%	0
Progressive Party	PRO	All Over Chile	997	1,436	650	3,339	323	6,745	1.79%	0	6,745	1.79%	0
Patriotic Union	UPA		323	616	245	1,285	121	2,590	0.69%	0	2,590	0.69%	0
Valid votes			50,540	146,044	43,431	80,700	55,912	376,627	100.00%	6	376,627	100.00%	6
Blank votes			2,118	5,431	1,725	5,005	1,656	15,935	3.91%				
Rejected votes – other			1,976	4,467	1,423	5,681	1,174	14,721	3.61%				
Total polled			54,634	155,942	46,579	91,386	58,742	407,283	59.37%				
Registered electors			89,772	251,198	74,117	185,846	85,041	685,974					
Turnout			60.86%	62.08%	62.85%	49.17%	69.07%	59.37%					

The following candidates were elected: Gonzalo Fuenzalida (RN), 60,132 votes; Tomás Hirsch (PH), 23,627 votes; Karin Luck (RN), 6,879 votes; Guillermo Ramírez (UDI), 30,731 votes; Catalina del Real (RN), 43,499 votes; and Francisco Undurraga (EVO), 58,666 votes.
