= Cristián Araya (politician) =

Chilean lawyer, psychologist, and politician

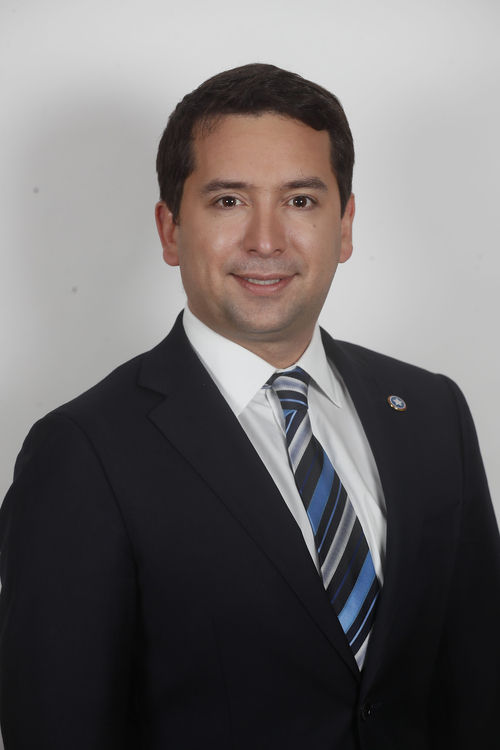
- Araya in 2022

Member of the Chamber of Deputies
- Incumbent
- Assumed office 11 March 2022
- Constituency: District 11

Councilor of Vitacura
- In office 6 December 2016 – 28 June 2021

Personal details
- Born: 30 September 1988 (age 37) Santiago, Chile
- Party: Republican (since 2019); Independent Democratic Union (until 2019)
- Education: Adolfo Ibáñez University
- Occupation: Lawyer and psychologist
- Website: https://caraya.cl/

Cristián Andrés Araya Lerdo de Tejada (born 30 September 1988) is a lawyer, psychologist, and politician from Chile. He currently serves as a deputy representing District 11, which includes the communes of Las Condes, Lo Barnechea, Vitacura, La Reina, and Peñalolén.

== Biography ==
Araya was born in Santiago de Chile on 30 September 1988, to Cristián Araya Molina and Cecilia Lerdo de Tejada Gajardo. From 1994 to 2006, he attended primary and secondary school at the José Victorino Lastarria High School. As a student leader, he was involved in the 2006 Penguin Revolution, where he opposed school occupations and developed a good relationship with Julio Isamit.

He studied psychology at Adolfo Ibáñez University, where he also earned a master's degree in Organizational Psychology. In 2016, he completed a degree in Legal Sciences at the same university and was admitted to the bar as a lawyer in 2020.

Araya is a volunteer firefighter with the 15th Company of Santiago and a reserve officer in the Chilean Army.

== Political career ==
Araya was a member of the Independent Democratic Union until 2019, when he joined the Republican Party.

In the 2016 municipal elections, he was elected as a councilor for Vitacura with 25.8% of the valid votes, representing the Independent Democratic Union. During his term, he was a dissenting voice on some issues against then-mayor Raúl Torrealba. As a member of the Republican Party, he ran for mayor of Vitacura in the 2021 elections and came in second place with 31.3% of the votes, losing to Evópoli candidate Camila Merino.

In 2021, Araya was elected as a deputy for District 11 in northeastern Santiago, representing the Republican Party.

During the Russo-Ukrainian War, Araya supported Ukraine and visited the country in May 2022 alongside deputy Benjamín Moreno Bascur.
