= Cristián Araya =

Cristián Araya may refer to:

- Cristián Araya (tennis)
- Cristián Araya (politician)
- Cristián Araya (badminton)
