= La Dehesa =

Neighbourhood in Lo Barnechea, Chile

Coordinates: 33°21′S 70°31′W

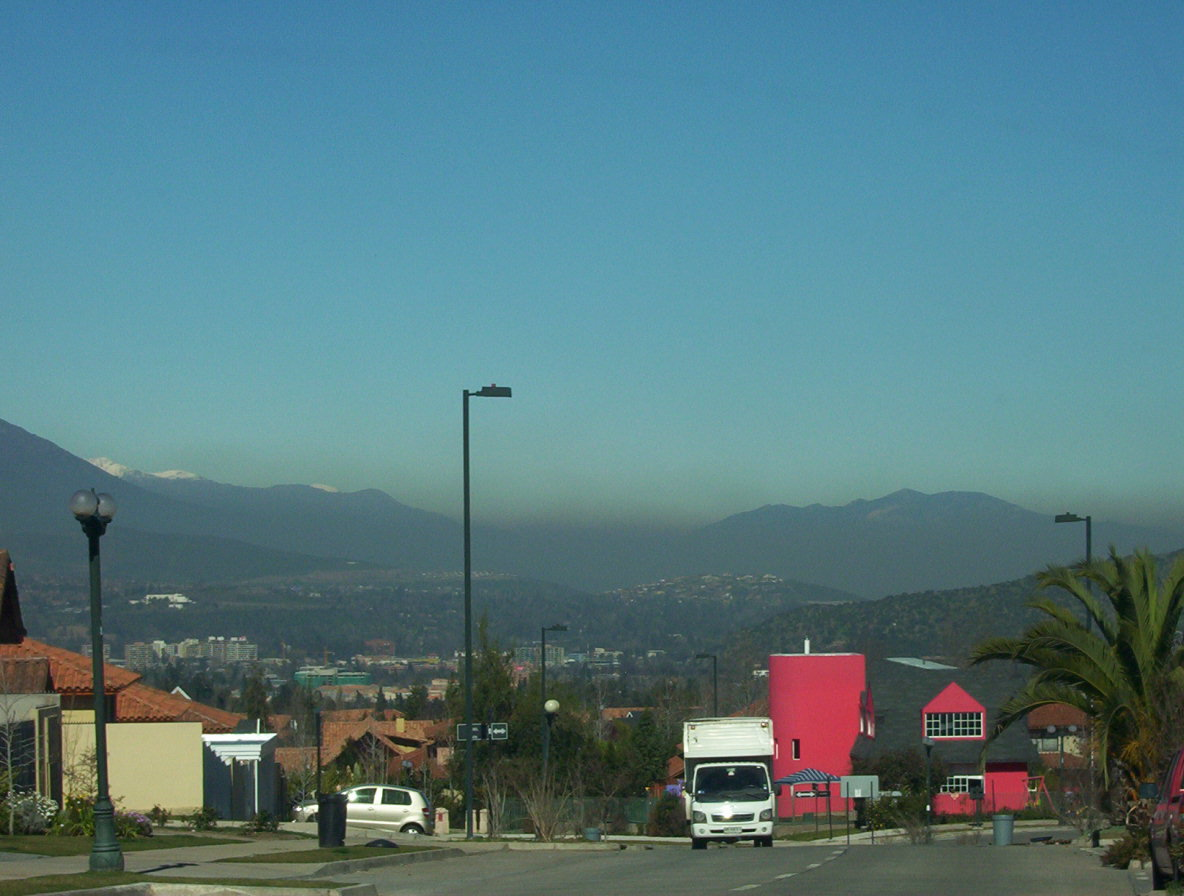
Basel street during mid–day

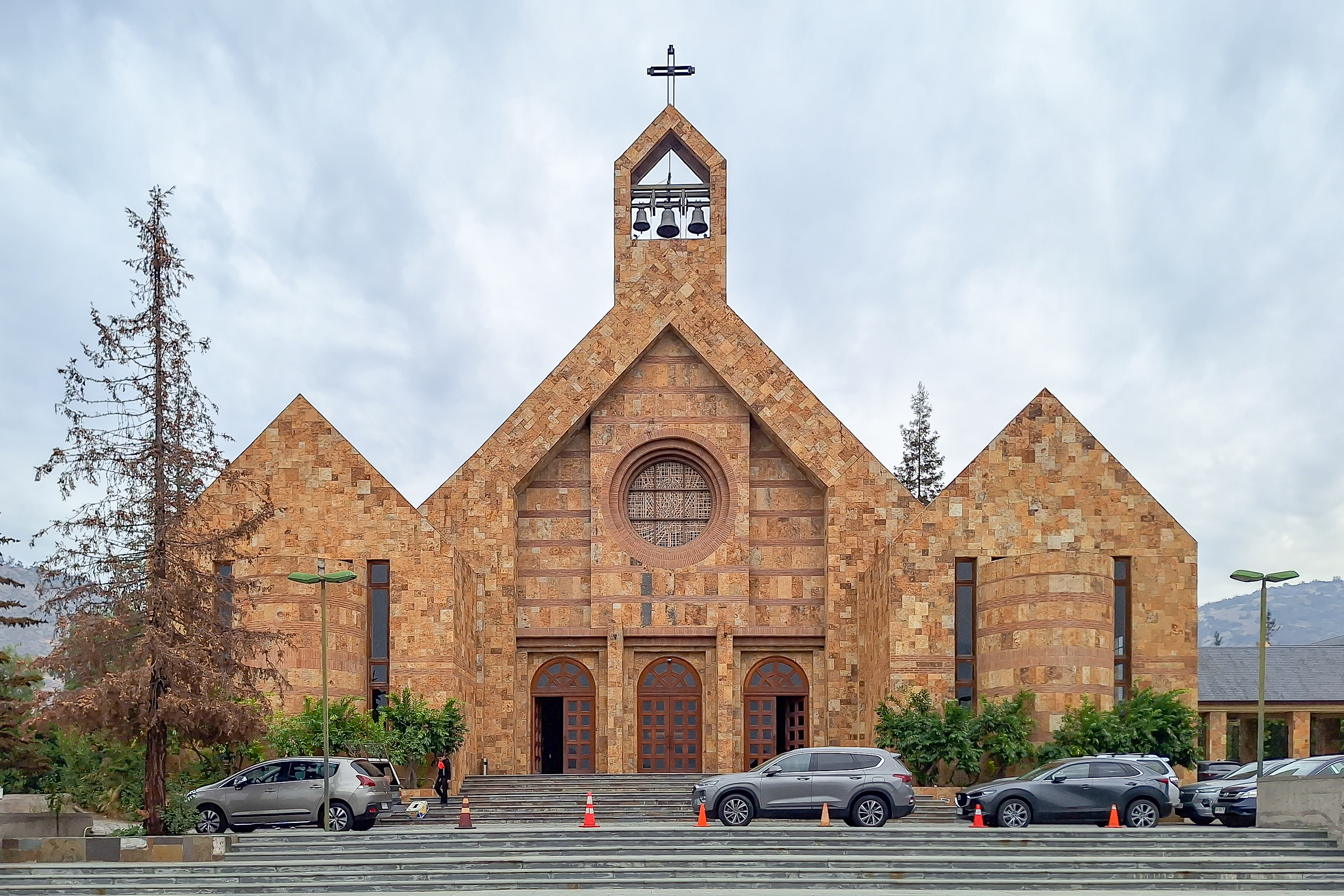
Mary Mother of Mercy church

La Dehesa is a suburban neighbourhood in Lo Barnechea commune of Santiago, Chile. It borders Las Condes to the south and Vitacura to the west. It is located in a valley near the Andes, northeast of the city, north of the Mapocho River. La Dehesa is known as one of Chile's most affluent neighborhoods.

== History ==
It is believed that the first human group to be discovered here were mainly hunter-gatherer nomads. They searched for guanacos; they arrived in Santiago in approximately 10,000 BCE. Around the year 800 BCE, the area became inhabited along the shores of the Mapocho River, representing the first sedentary population, which resulted from the establishment of farming communities and the lamini's domestication. Inca and the Spanish controlled the area during the seventeenth century. The Spanish were still in control of the area in the early 1800s when Bernardo O'Higgins helped to win its independence from that empire in 1810.

In 1964, important archeological materials were discovered in La Dehesa, some of the most important of which were five tembetás, Aconcagua salmón, and a fragmented pipe of Mapuche origin. Several archaeological deposits were detected during construction, with findings linked to the Bato Tradition, evidence that aboriginals previously inhabited the location.

The harshest disaster that occurred in the area was in 1982 when coastal towns were inundated. The area was previously called Huayco, an Inca word that meant: "Place of serious inundations."

== Notable people ==
- Mario Kreutzberger
- Rafael Araneda
- Raquel Argandoña
- Karen Doggenweiler
- Marco Enríquez-Ominami
- Roberto Martínez Vásquez
- Paulina Nin de Cardona
- Augusto Pinochet
- Marcela Vacarezza
- Jorge Valdivia

== See also ==
- Lo Barnechea
