= Clínica Alemana de Santiago =

- Corporación Chileno-Alemana de Beneficencia

Geography
- Location: Avenida Vitacura 5951, Vitacura, Santiago de Chile, Metropolitan Region, Chile
- Coordinates: 33°23′30.59″S 70°34′22.52″W

Organisation
- Care system: Private
- Type: General
- Affiliated university: Universidad del Desarrollo

Services
- Emergency department: Yes
- Beds: ~400 (as of 2020s)

History
- Founded: 1918

Links
- Website: www.alemana.cl
- Lists: Hospitals in Chile

Clínica Alemana de Santiago (Spanish: "The German Clinic of Santiago") is a private healthcare institution in Santiago de Chile, Chile. It forms part of a network whose operations are conducted by the non-profit Corporación Chileno-Alemana de Beneficencia, and operates its main campus in the Vitacura district, plus additional branches in La Dehesa and Chicureo.

== History ==
The initiative dates to the German-Chilean community's founding of a hospital in 1918 on Dávila Street in what is now the Independencia commune. In 1970 the building was sold, and in March 1973 the present Vitacura facility was inaugurated.

The institution's legal predecessor, established 5 July 1905, was the Sociedad de Beneficencia Hospital Alemán.

In 1999 the clinic opened its medical centre in La Dehesa, while in 2006 a new 16-storey diagnostics tower at Vitacura was completed. In 2020 the Chicureo branch began operations.

In 2012 a restructuring transferred the health assets to a new corporate vehicle, Clínica Alemana SpA, wholly owned by the Beneficence Corporation.

== Governance and ownership ==
Clínica Alemana de Santiago S.A. is the main operating company and is ultimately controlled by the non-profit Corporación Chileno-Alemana de Beneficencia, founded in 1905. The corporation reinvests its surplus into social programmes, medical infrastructure, and education.

== Scale and facilities ==
As of the 2020s, the Vitacura campus has approximately 400 beds, 19 operating theatres and over 900 physicians on staff. It also includes around 2,300 parking spaces and a 16-storey outpatient tower. The institution reports around 35,000 hospitalised patients per year and acts as a referral centre for complex cases in oncology, cardiology, trauma and perinatal surgery.

== Services and specialties ==
Clínica Alemana offers a wide range of medical specialties, including anaesthesiology, pulmonology, cardiothoracic surgery, oncology, rehabilitation and laboratory services. It has been accredited by the Joint Commission International (JCI) since August 2008, reflecting its compliance with global quality standards.

== Academic affiliation and research ==
The clinic serves as a teaching hospital for the Facultad de Medicina Clínica Alemana–Universidad del Desarrollo, established in 2001, supporting medical training and research programmes. It also maintains a biomedical informatics and telemedicine department focused on health-IT innovation.

== Social responsibility and sustainability ==
In its 2023 Sustainability Report, the clinic reported over 2,600 free health-care interventions for public patients on waiting lists, as part of its social mandate.

== Recognition and ranking ==
The institution has been ranked among the top private hospitals in Latin America, placing second in the "Best Hospitals of Latin America" ranking by AméricaEconomía Intelligence in 2011.

== Notable patients ==
Chilean politician José Miguel Insulza was hospitalised at the Vitacura campus in September 2025 for a cardiac pacemaker implantation.

Fernando Gago, an Argentinian retired footballer and current manager of Club Universidad de Chile, was rushed into an emergency room with an acute myocardial infarction on 19 June 2026 and had an urgent heart surgery performed the same day.

== See also ==
- Healthcare in Chile
