= Lo Barnechea =

Commune in Santiago, Chile

- Commune
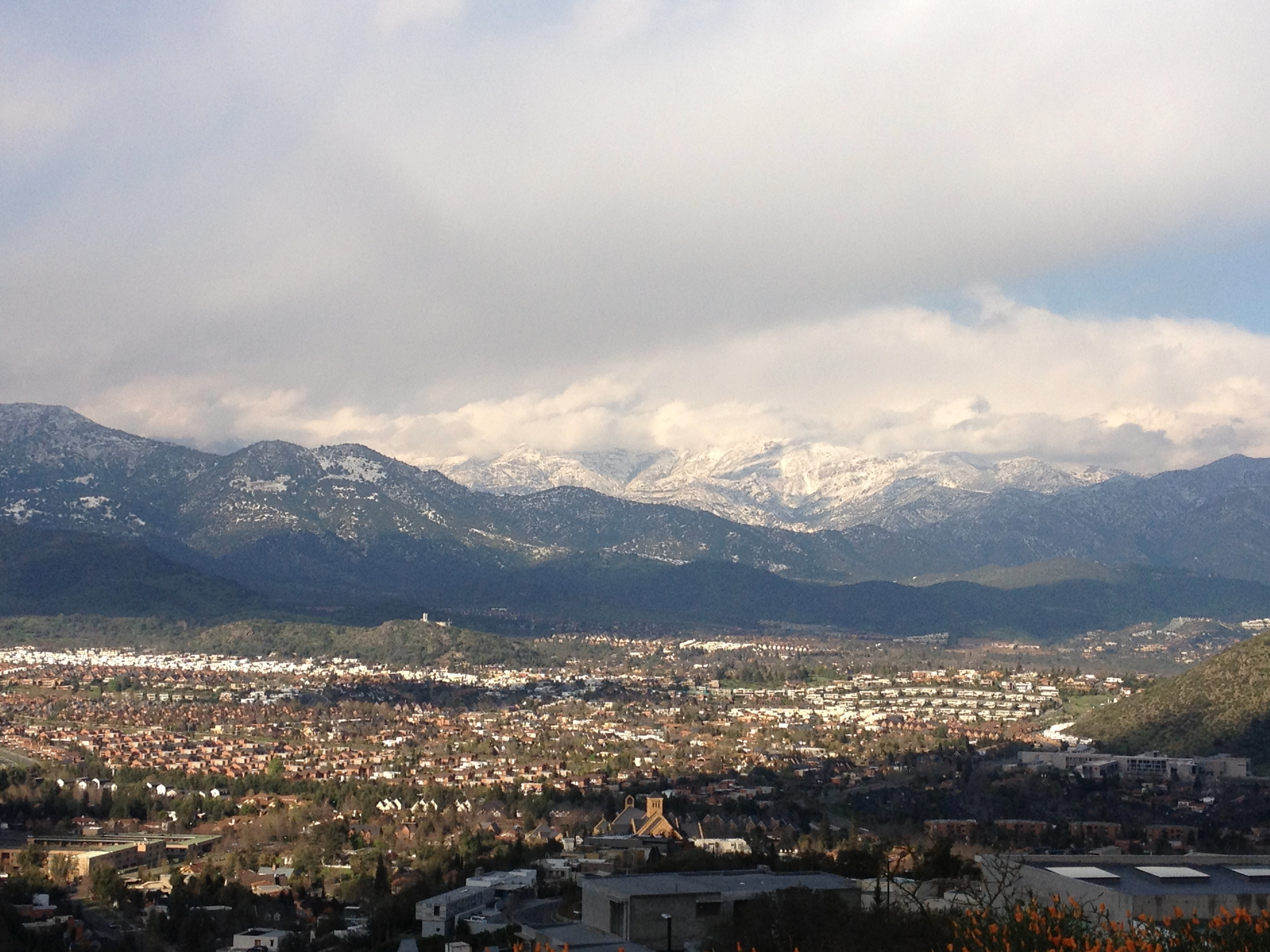
- Los Trapenses, Lo Barnechea

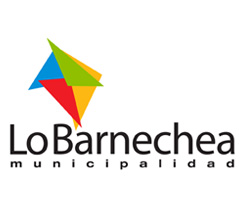
- Coat of arms Location of Lo Barnechea in Greater Santiago Location in Chile
- Coordinates (city): 33°21′S 70°31′W
- Country: Chile
- Region: Santiago Metropolitan
- Province: Santiago
- Founded: 9 March 1981

Government
  - Mayor: Felipe Alessandri (RN)

Area
  - Total: 1,023.7 km^{2} (395.3 sq mi)
- Elevation: 800 m (2,600 ft)

Population (2024)
  - Total: 112,620
  - Density: 110.01/km^{2} (284.93/sq mi)
- Demonym(s): Barnecheíno, -a barnecheano, -a
- Time zone: UTC−4
  - Summer (DST): UTC−3
- Website: www.lobarnechea.cl

Lo Barnechea is a commune located in the northeastern zone of Santiago, in the Santiago Province in the Santiago Metropolitan Region in Chile. Its urban boundaries include Los Andes of the Valparaíso region to the north, Colina to the west, Vitacura and Huechuraba to the southwest, Las Condes to the south and San José de Maipo to the east. It has 112,620 inhabitants.

It developed around the old rural town of Lo Barnechea. Its population is heterogeneous, as it is inhabited by high- and medium-high-income families in sectors such as La Dehesa, Los Trapenses and El Arrayán, while there are medium-low- and low-income families in the towns of Lo Barnechea, Población La Ermita and Cerro Dieciocho.

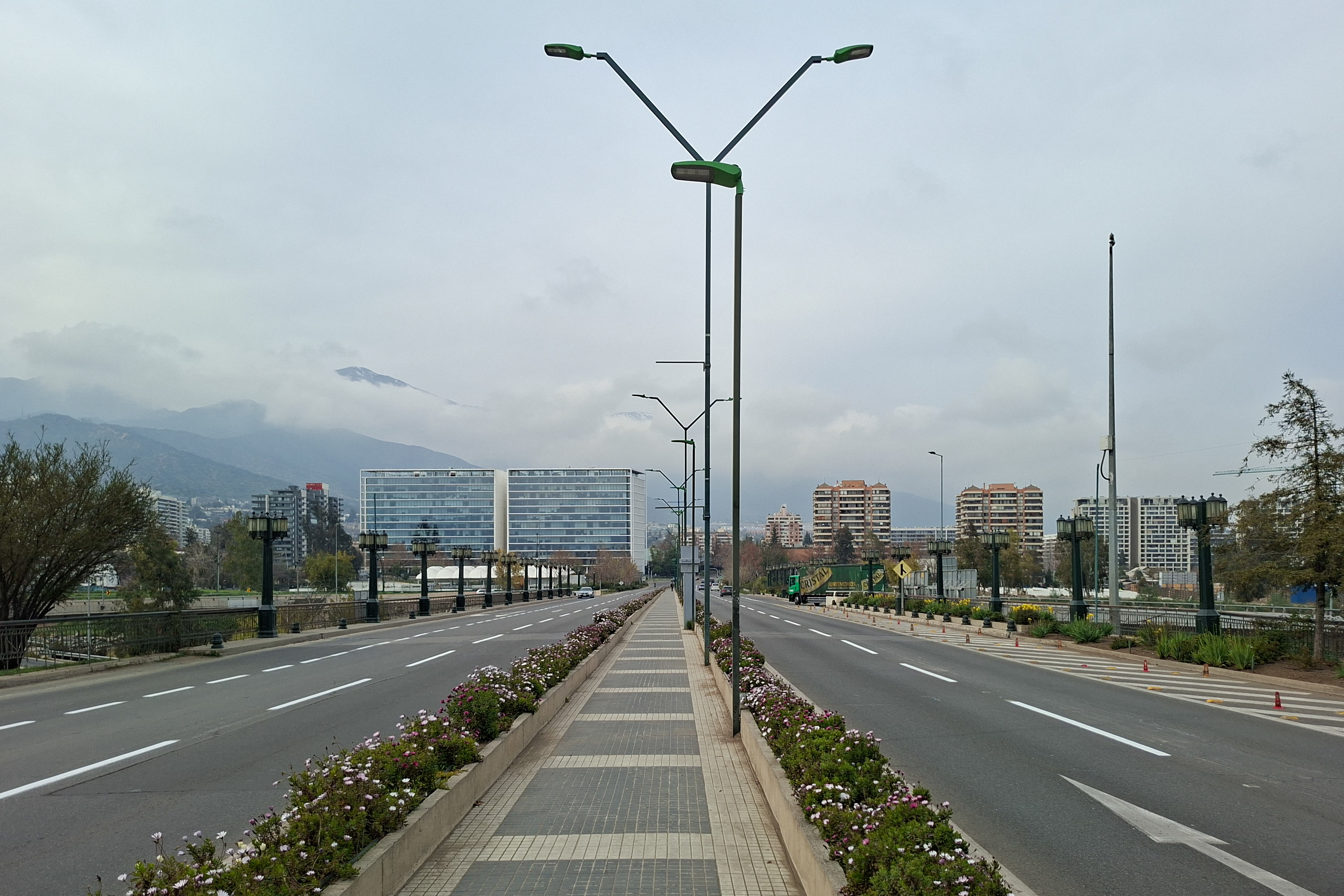
La Dehesa bridge

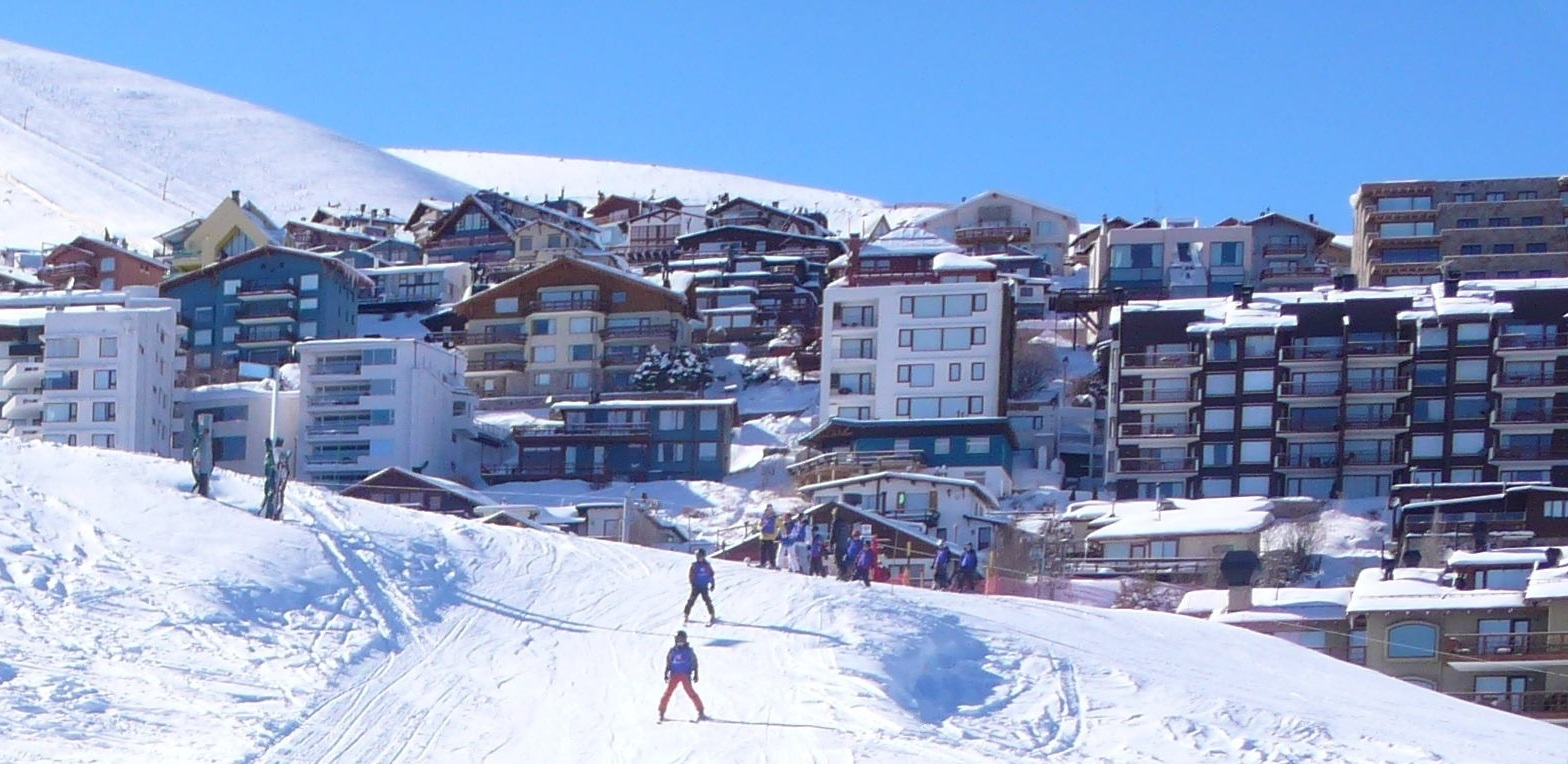
La Parva ski center

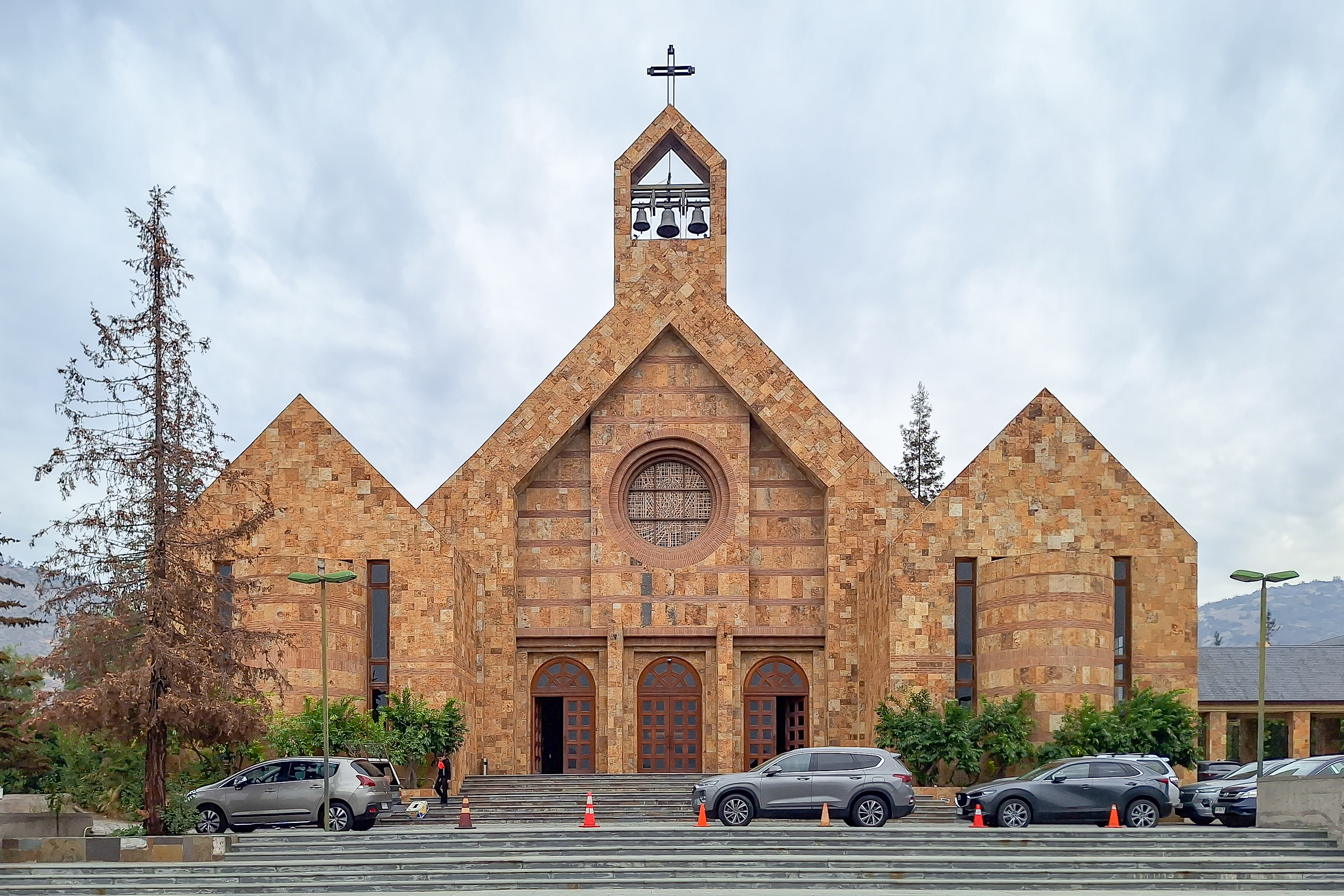
Iglesia María Madre de la Misericordia

== History ==
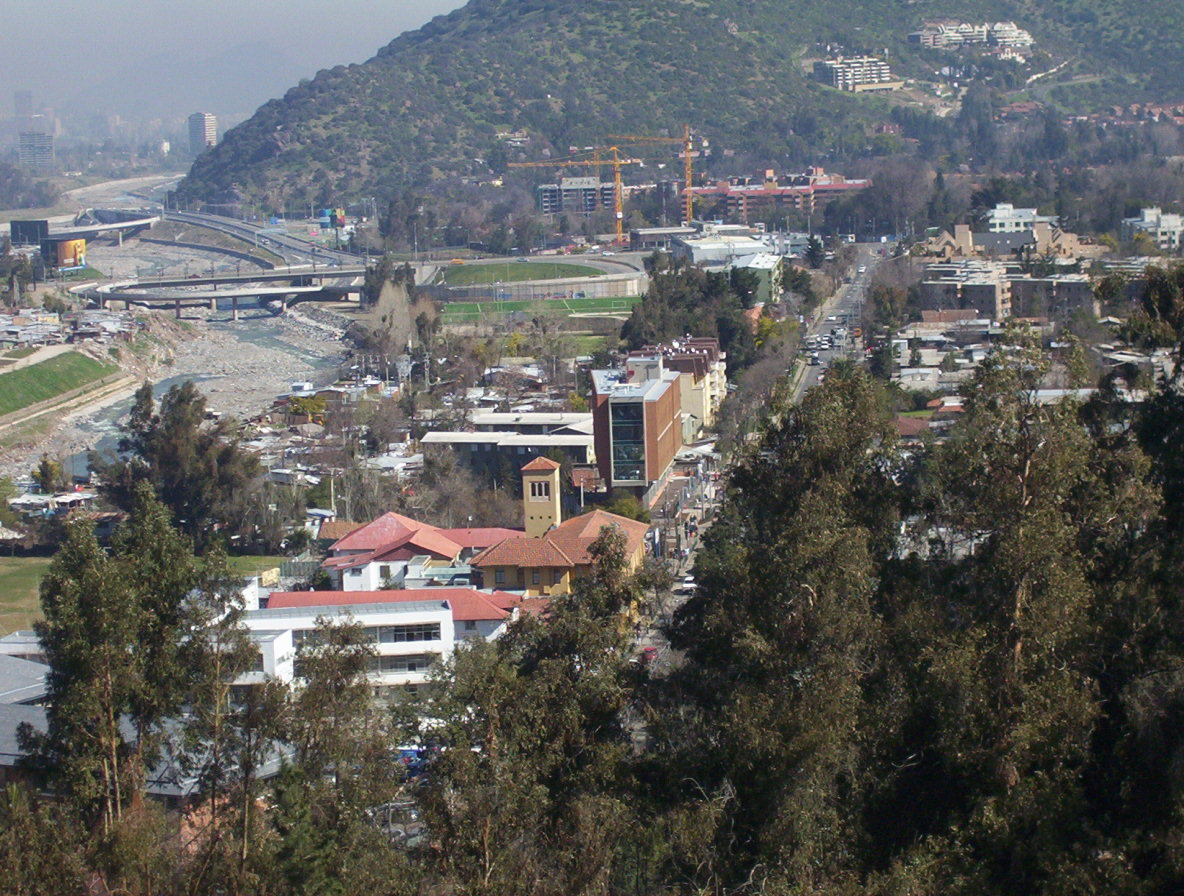
Commune of Lo Barnechea seen from the top of Cerro Dieciocho. The parish church, the Mapocho River and Cerro Alvarado can be seen in the background.

Lo Barnechea has been inhabited by humans for thousands of years. Before the Incas, it was occupied by the Llolleo culture and the Bato tradition, and after them, the Aconcagua culture, the Promaucaes, the Incas and later the Spanish occupation.

Its pre-Hispanic inhabitants were called huaicoches (in Mapudungún: waykoche 'people who live in a landslide zone') because of the huaicos or huaycos of the region (in Quechua: wayqu 'stream'). Also called lloclla (in Quechua: lluqlla 'alluvium'), these are violent alluvial floods in which a large amount of material from the slopes is dislodged and dragged by the water downstream to the bottom of the valleys, causing enormous burial sites in its path. In modern scientific terms, according to the Multinational Andean Project, a huayco is known as a debris flow, or debris flow. A huayco is caused by the violent fall of water, which drags mud, stones, trees and anything else in its path. Its origin may be due to an intense rainfall or the overflowing of a river or lagoon at high altitudes.

The town of Lo Barnechea was created in the 19th century. So far, it has resisted conurbation with Greater Santiago.

The DFL 1-3260 of 9 March 1981 established the new commune of Lo Barnechea, from a subdivision of the commune of Las Condes; however, until 1991, it was part of the communal grouping managed by the Municipality of Las Condes. By Decree with Force of Law No. 32-18.992 of 20 May 1991, the Municipality of Lo Barnechea was officially established, the same day as its neighbor Vitacura.

== Geography ==
=== Terrain ===
==== Rivers ====
- Mapocho River
- San Francisco
- Molina River

==== Stream ====
- El Arrayán Stream (Nature Sanctuary)
- El Carrizo Stream
- El Gabino Stream
- El Guindo Stream
- El Manzano Stream
- Las Hualtatas Stream
- Las Rosas Stream

==== Creeks ====
- El Culén Creek
- El Ají Creek
- El Guindo Creek
- El Peumo Creek
- Huallalolén Creek
- La Carbonera Creek
- Las Ñipas Creek
- Las Zorras Creek
- Los Chanchos Creek

=== Cityscape ===
The urban center of Lo Barnechea is located in the areas below 1,000 meters above sea level, in the basin of the Mapocho River and the valley of La Dehesa. Its neighborhoods are composed of affluent sectors such as Los Trapenses, La Dehesa and El Huinganal (Molle Schinus polygamus, in Mapudungún Huingan), El Tranque, and middle class sectors such as the traditional Pueblo de Lo Barnechea, Cerro 18, San Enrique and El Arrayán.

Many of its streets evoke the old alleys owned by the seven founding families. El León Street once housed the old Parador and Hostería de El León, which used to welcome miners after their long days of work. On this street lived the Salfate sisters, now deceased, who knew the history of the town and its inhabitants: Blanca and Irene Griselda. Their stories about the mythical trips to the Laguna del Viento in the foothills of the Andes and the local mythology enlivened the village's social gatherings in the afternoons.

Towards the northwest there are neighborhoods with Spanish names: Chin street is the location of the owner of a parcel of land with the surname Echeñique. In the Trapenses area, many of the landmarks associated with this congregation— which was based in the commune for many years before selling its land for capital gain, are still remembered. Currently, at the end of the Trapenses there is a road that connects La Dehesa with Chicureo.

=== Climate ===
Lo Barnechea has in the semi-arid Mediterranean climate in a similar fashion to the rest of the Metropolitan Region, characterized by a prolonged dry season and a winter season, which concentrates annual rainfall.

- Annual rainfall 360 mm
- Average temperature 14 °C
- Average Maximum Temperature 22 °C
- Average Minimum Temperature 7 °C

The climatic patterns present very important variations due to its location as a foothill area, which subjects it to the effects of altitude. It is estimated that in a mountainous environment, rainfall increases by about 22 mm every 100 m of altitude, while the temperature decreases by about 0.5 °C every 100 m. Due to this, being the urban area of the town of Lo Barnechea located at 850 m a.s.l. and above the rest of Santiago, it receives 65 mm more rainfall than in the commune of Santiago in the center of the city. This varies due to the size of the rural territory of the commune. In the annual distribution of rainfall, and considering the entire mountainous area, when it rains several days in a row, large flows are produced in the riverbeds, which causes flooding by accumulation and its subsequent transfer to the slopes.

The topography of the Mapocho River and its location, means that these climatic event will need to be taken into account in planning the future population distribution of the Commune.

==== Flood of 1982 ====
The Flood of 1982 occurred with the incursion of warm winter fronts causing a rise in the lower limit of the snowpack, from 1800 to 2400 meters above sea level, generating a large increase in the volume of water and sediment runoff as a result of the melting of the snow, which caused saturation and subsequent overflow of the natural and artificial water drainage systems. The impact of this flood were tragic and disruptive, with loss of life, interruption of activities and damage to infrastructure and equipment, due to the permanence of inhabitants on the banks of the Mapocho River.

The repetition of a similar event, under the current conditions of occupation and urban expansion in Lo Barnechea, could cause an even more catastrophic event, due to the high degree of intervention and modification of the natural system as a result of the construction development that continues to take place on increasingly higher ground.

== Administration ==
=== Municipality ===
As a commune, Lo Barnechea is a third-level administrative division of Chile administered by a municipal council, headed by a mayor who is directly elected every four years. The 2024-2028 mayor is Felipe Alessandri (RN). The communal council at the time had the following members:

- Benjamín Errázuriz Palacios (REP)
- Carmen Mc Intyre Astorga (REP)
- Francisco Madrid Vera (Ind/AH)
- Paulette Guiloff Hes (Evópoli)
- Pablo Errázuriz de la Maza (Ind/UDI)
- Juan Chomali Kattan (RN)
- Michael Comber Vial (RN)
- Juan Pablo Parada Da Fonseca (Ind/RN)

=== Parliamentary representation ===
Lo Barnechea belongs to Electoral District No. 11 together with the municipalities of Las Condes, Vitacura, La Reina and Peñalolén and to the VII Senatorial District (Santiago Metropolitan Region).

It is represented in the Chamber of Deputies of the National Congress for the 2022-2026 term by the following deputies:

- Catalina Del Real Mihovilovic (RN)
- Gonzalo de la Carrera Correa (Ind)
- Cristián Araya Lerdo de Tejada (REP)
- Guillermo Ramírez (UDI)
- Francisco Undurraga Gazitúa (EVOP)
- Tomás Hirsch Goldschmidt (AH)

In the Senate, Lo Barnechea is represented by Rojo Edwards (PSC), Luciano Cruz-Coke (EVOP), Manuel José Ossandón (RN), Fabiola Campillai (Ind.), and Claudia Pascual (PCCh) for the 2022-2030 term.

== Demographics ==
Historical population
| Year | Pop. | ±% p.a. |
|---|---|---|
| 1970 | 11,174 | — |
| 1982 | 24,258 | +6.67% |
| 1992 | 50,062 | +7.51% |
| 2002 | 74,749 | +4.09% |
| 2017 | 105,833 | +2.35% |
| 2024 | 112,620 | +0.89% |
Source: INE, Memoria Chilena

As of the 2024 census, the population is 112,620, of which 47.6% are males, and 52.4% are females. People under 15 years old make up 20.1% of the population, and people over 65 years old make up 11.4%. 99.3% of the population is urban and 0.7% is rural.

=== Ethnic minorities ===
As of the 2024 census, Indigenous peoples make up 2.8% of the population, and Afro-Chileans make up 0.3%.

=== Religion ===
As of the 2024 census, 77.4% of the population over 15 years old are Christians (70.4% Catholics, 5.7% Evangelicals or Protestants, and 1.3% other branches), 3.1% are Jews, 0.1% are Muslims, 0.2% are Buddhists, 0.1% are Hinduists, 0.3% are adrehents of other religions, and 18.9% are irreligious.

=== Immigration ===
As of the 2024 census, immigrants make up 10.8% of the population - 7.0% are from South America, 1.6% from North America, 1.2% from Europe, 0.8% from Asia, 0.1% from Africa, and 0.1% from Oceania.

== Architecture ==
The architecture in the area of buildings is very scarce, with a few late colonial style houses located preferably in the so-called Pueblo de Lo Barnechea. Within the commercial area, there are the shopping centers Portal La Dehesa, Espacio Urbano La Dehesa, Paseo Los Trapenses and Mall Vivo Los Trapenses. Also noteworthy is the large number of mansions and luxury homes that are established in this commune, especially in the sectors of Arrayán, Los Trapenses and La Dehesa, with these styles built mainly during the last twenty years and associated with the "upper class" of the country, making the commune one of the most expensive in the country in terms of average house prices.

In parallel to the construction of houses and luxury apartments, social housing was developed in Lo Barnechea, in addition to the processes of self-construction of the founding tenants of the town, along with their generations. For the same reason, in the commune of Lo Barnechea we can see a series of contrasts, not only architectural, but also of social character, given that in a few square meters, or bycrossing a street (Padre Alfredo Arteaga Barros with Comandante Malbec), neighborhoods of high socioeconomic strata can be seen, in juxtaposition to sectors of low social strata, with clear delimitions between them.

== Economy ==
In 2018, the number of registered companies in Lo Barnechea was 10,072. The Economic Complexity Index (ECI) in the same year was 1.01, while the economic activities with the highest Revealed Comparative Advantage (RCA) index were Retail Sale of Underwear and Personal Wear (42.14), Dance Instructors (27.49) and Amusement Parks and Similar Centers Activities (18.79).

== Transport ==
The commune has weak connections to the interconnected public transport of the city as a consequence of being located at a far end of the metropolitan area, together with Vitacura it leads the rate of motorization per capita (motor vehicles per inhabitant) in Greater Santiago. It was expected that by 2020, Lo Barnechea would have three stations of the Las Condes Tramway, which would give it a historic connection to the Santiago Metro, being currently one of the three communes of Greater Santiago (along with La Pintana and Lo Espejo) that does not have stations within the metro system. However, the project was canceled by the authorities due to a lack of funding and subsidies for its development.

Lo Barnechea is part of the Transantiago feeder zone C, together with the districts of Providencia, Las Condes and Vitacura. It is currently served by units 4 and 6 of this transportation system.

There is an elevator on Cerro 18 operated by the Municipality of Lo Barnechea which connects this sector with Los Quincheros Street and the top of the hill, where the Parque de la Chilenidad is located.

== Education ==
=== Higher Education ===
- Andrés Bello National University
- Universidad del Desarrollo
- University of Chile
  - The University of Chile is present in the commune with its Faculty of Medicine, East Campus, which maintains the Serjoven Health Centre, which provides free care to more than 1,000 impoverished adolescents within Lo Barnechea each year.
- Culinary Institute
- CPEIP
  - Centro de Perfeccionamiento, Experimentación e Investigaciones Pedagógicas del Ministerio de Educación.

=== Municipal Schools ===
- Colegio Diferencial Madre Tierra
- Colegio de Adultos Fermín Vivaceta
- Colegio Farellones

Colegio Lo Barnechea with three campuses:

- Eduardo Cuevas Valdes Campus (Early childhood, pre-kindergarten through 2nd grade)
- San José Campus (Intermediate, 3rd through 6th grade)
- Instituto Estados Americanos Campus (from 7th to 4th grade Polyvalent)

=== Subsidized Schools ===
- Colegio Polivalente San Rafael
- Colegio Parroquial Santa Rosa
- Centro Educacional San Esteban Mártir
- Colegio Betterland School
- Colegio San Juan de Kronstandt

=== Private Schools ===
- Craighouse School
- Colegio Nido de Águilas
- Colegio Everest
- Santiago College
- Colegio Monte Tabor y Nazaret
- The Southland School
- Colegio Newland
- The Mayflower School
- Colegio Huinganal
- Colegio los Alerces
- Huelquén Montessori
- Instituto Hebreo
- Maimonides School
- Lincoln International Academy
- Bertrait College
- Anglo American International School
- Japanese Language Institute (サンチャゴ日本人学校), a Japanese school overseas

== Sport ==
Currently, Lo Barnechea is home to two soccer teams that participate in official competitions, one at the professional level and one at the amateur level.

| Team | Establishment | Competition | Stadium |
|---|---|---|---|
| AC Barnechea | 1929 | Primera B | Lo Barnechea Municipal Stadium |
| Atlético Oriente | 2020 | Tercera B | Lo Barnechea Municipal Stadium |

== International relations ==
=== Twin towns – sister cities ===
- Tyler, Texas, United States
- Guayaquil, Ecuador (Note: Twinning since 2006.)

== See also ==
History

- Huaico
- Huaicoche
- Casa de piedra

Localities

- Los Trapenses
- Pueblo Lo Barnechea
- Corral Quemado (Chile)
- El Arrayán
- La Ermita

Entidades y personas

- Cuerpo de Bomberos de Santiago
- Doña Tina
- Barnechea Fútbol Club
- Pollo al Coñac
- Consuelo Michaeli
- El Mesón de la Patagonia
- Leontina Santibáñez
- Portal La Dehesa
- International School Nido de Águilas

== Bibliography ==
- León Echáiz, René. ÑuÑohue, Historia de Ñuñoa, Providencia, Las Condes, Vitacura y La Reina, Editorial Francisco de Aguirre, primera edición, 1972.
- Piwonka Figueroa, Gonzalo. Las aguas de Santiago de Chile, 1541-1999.
