= Cuerpo de Bomberos de Santiago =

Fire Department in Santiago de Chile

Santiago Fire Department
- Cuerpo de Bomberos de Santiago

Operational area
- Country: Chile
- Address: 978 Santo Domingo Street

Agency overview
- Established: 1863
- Staffing: Volunteer
- EMS level: BLS First Responder
- Motto: Constancy and Discipline

Facilities and equipment
- Stations: 22

The Cuerpo de Bomberos de Santiago (CBS) provides fire protection, technical rescue services and hazardous materials response for the comunas of Santiago, Estación Central, Renca, Recoleta (Southern portion), Independencia, Providencia, Las Condes, Vitacura and Lo Barnechea, in Santiago de Chile. The fire department consists of 22 companies, which makes it the largest fire department in Chile. It was established on 20 December 1863. Like all fire departments in Chile, it is a volunteer agency.

== History ==
The Iglesia de la Compañía Fire in 1863 prompted the creation of an organized fire protection service in Santiago. José Luis Claro y Cruz, a well-off citizen of the city, called to meeting to form a fire company that would provide fire services to prevent such calamities as that of the mentioned church.

In El Ferrocarril newspaper published on 14 December 1863 was mentioned that a 200 people group had held a called meeting to decide to form a fire department and that the assembly, by general acclamation, elected the members of the board of directors for the future organization, including José Besa, Ángel Custodio Gallo, José Luis Claro and Enrique Meiggs. It also was decided that a new meeting will be held on 20 December 1863, the date of the official creation of the Cuerpo de Bomberos de Santiago. It was immediately agreed that the department would be organized into four companies (del Oriente, del Sur and del Poniente, and a fourth company named Compañía de Guardias de Propiedad), and that it would adopt the administrative and regulatory regime of the Cuerpo de Bomberos de Valparaíso, the first fire organization in Chile.

== Volunteer Firefighter of Santiago Monument ==
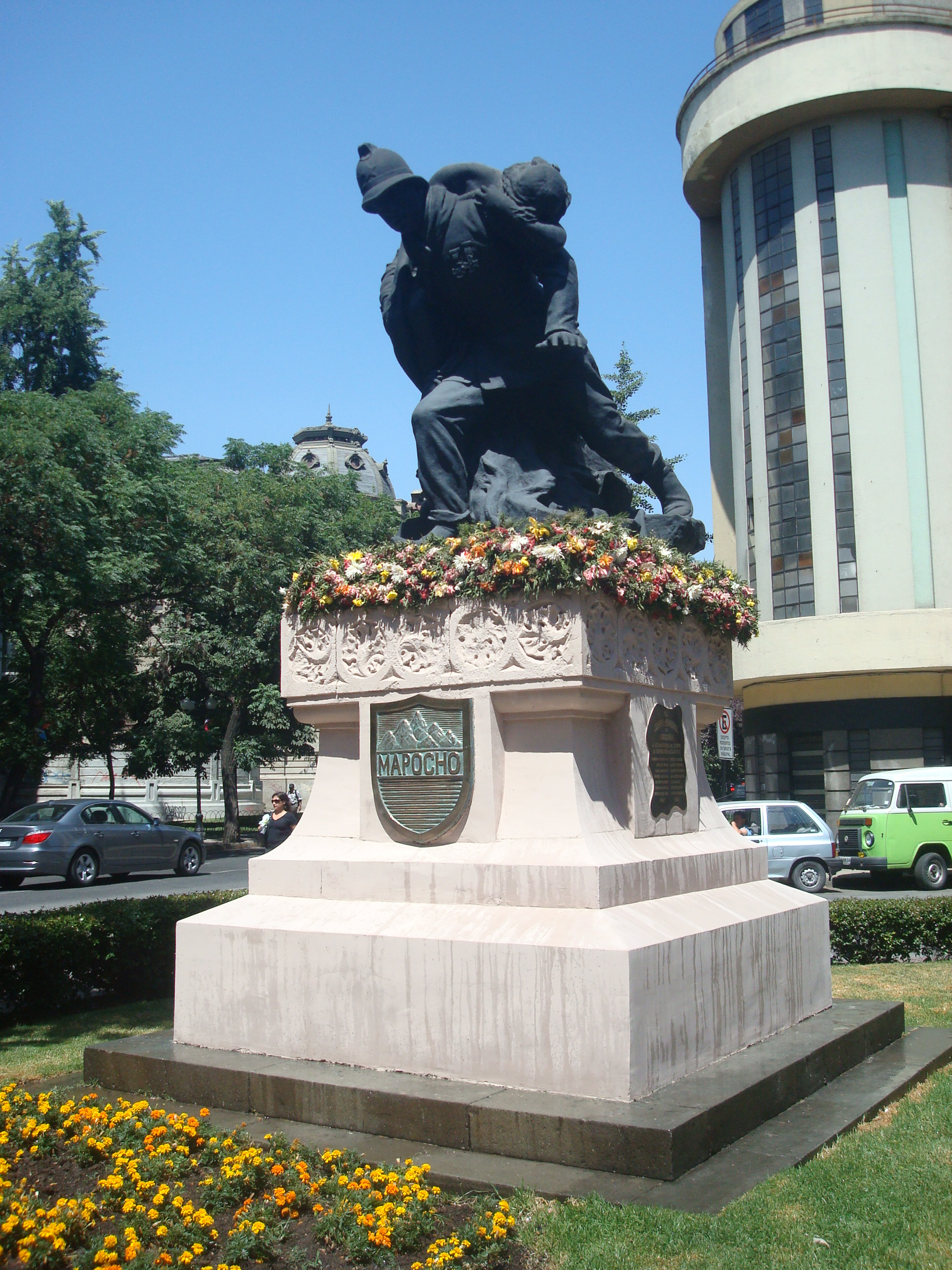
The monument in 2009.

The monument was installed in 1913 by the Municipalidad de Santiago, for the commemoration of the 50th anniversary of the foundation of the Cuerpo de Bomberos de Santiago (20 December 1863). The statue was designed by the Spanish artist Antonio Coll y Pi.

It is located close to the Santiago Museum of Contemporary Art and installed on a small square that is adjacent to the Parque Forestal, named Ismael Valdés Vergara, who was a volunteer firefighter and founder of the Fifth Company Arturo Prat.
