= Northeastern zone of Santiago =

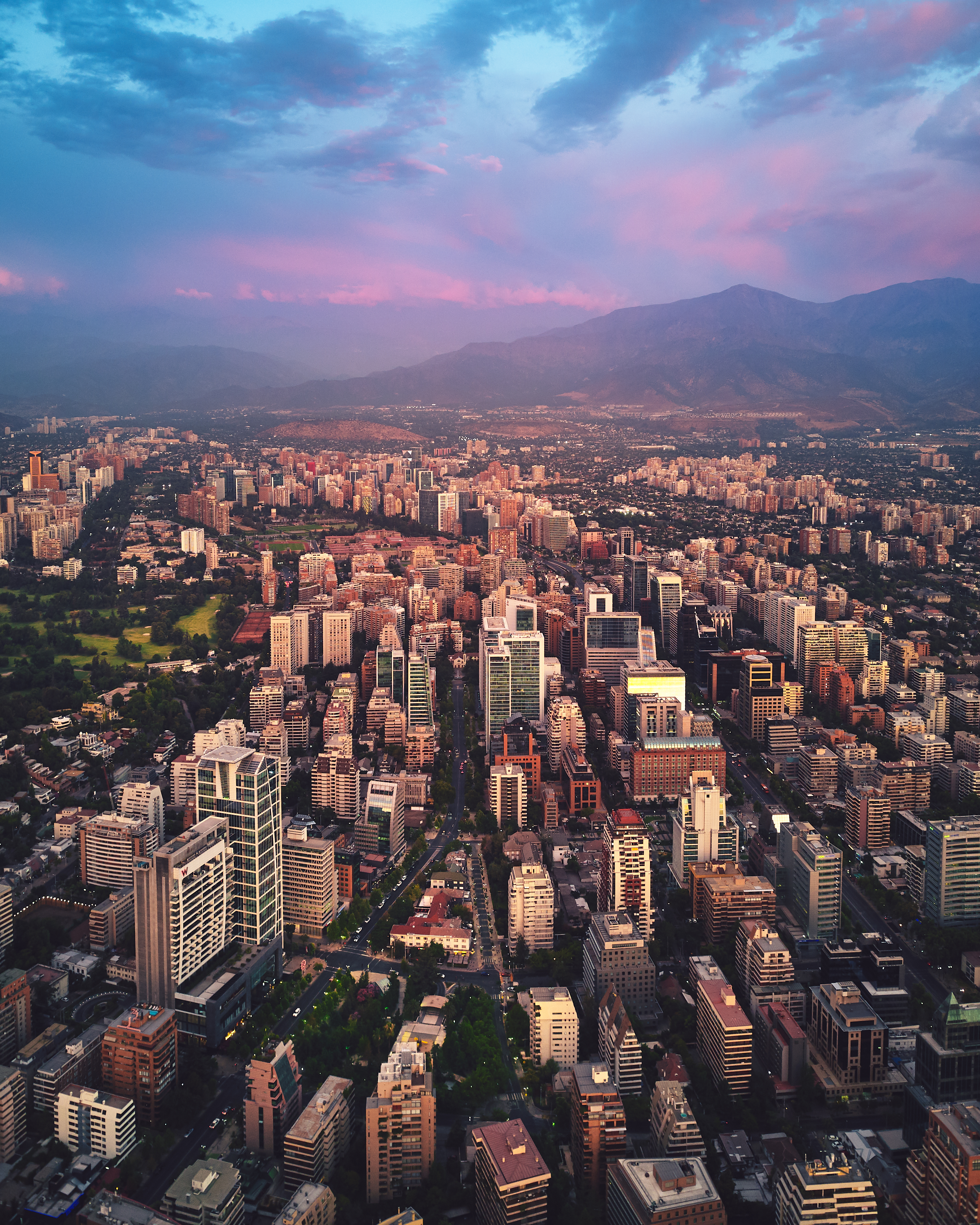
View of Las Condes from Gran Torre Santiago.

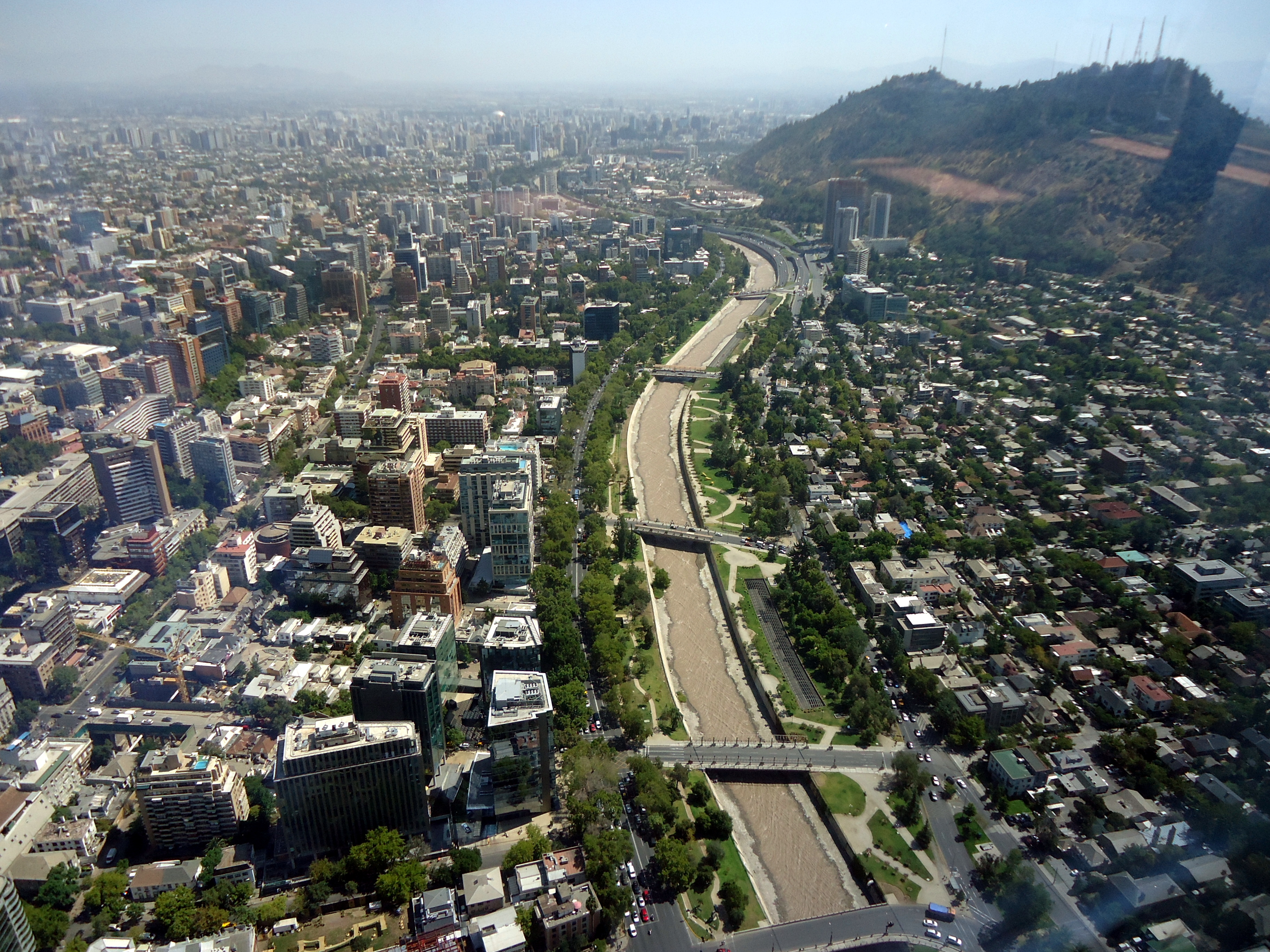
North Providencia and Mapocho river.

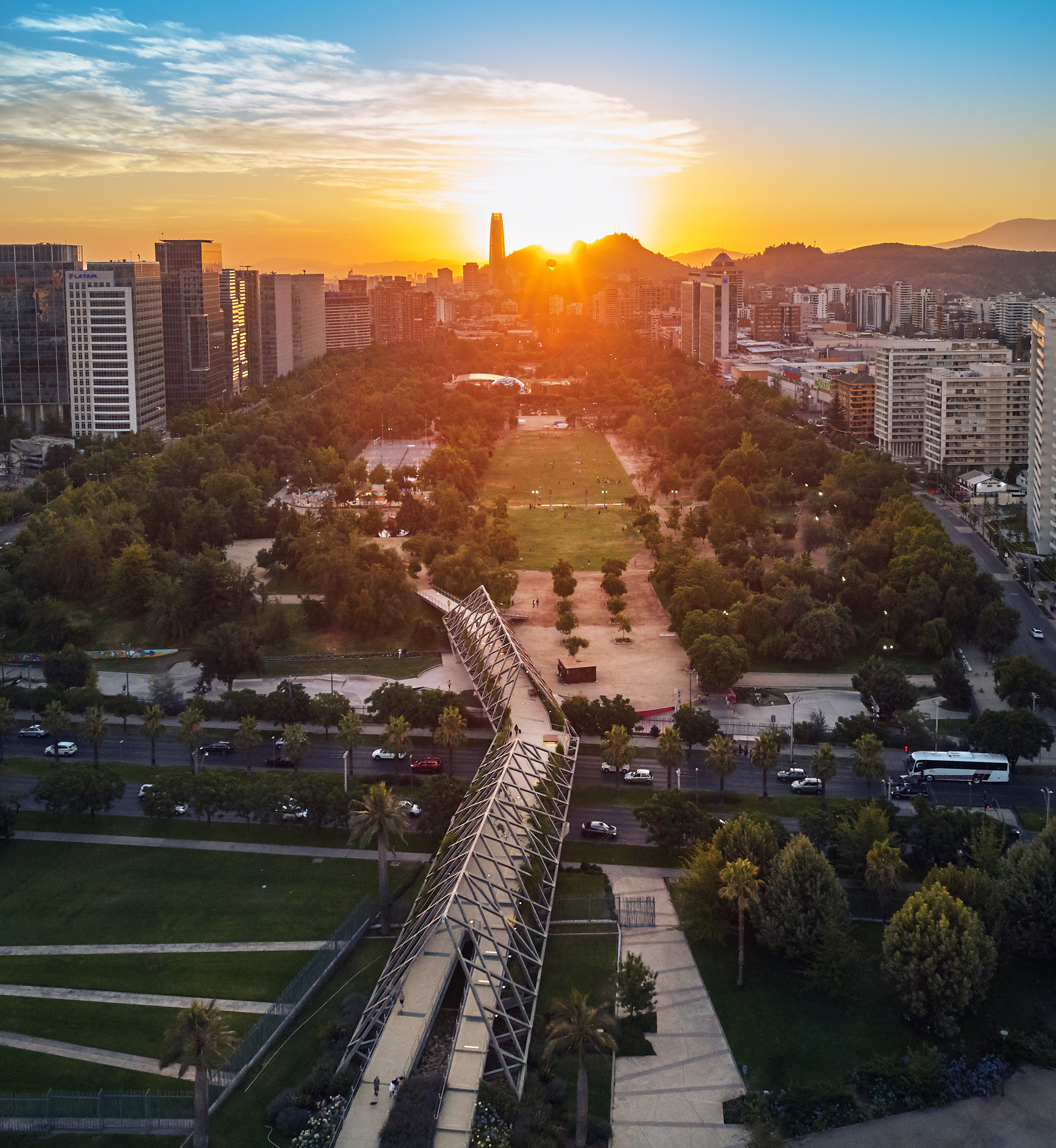
Araucano Park. The area quadruplicates the square meters of green areas per inhabitant than the rest of the city.

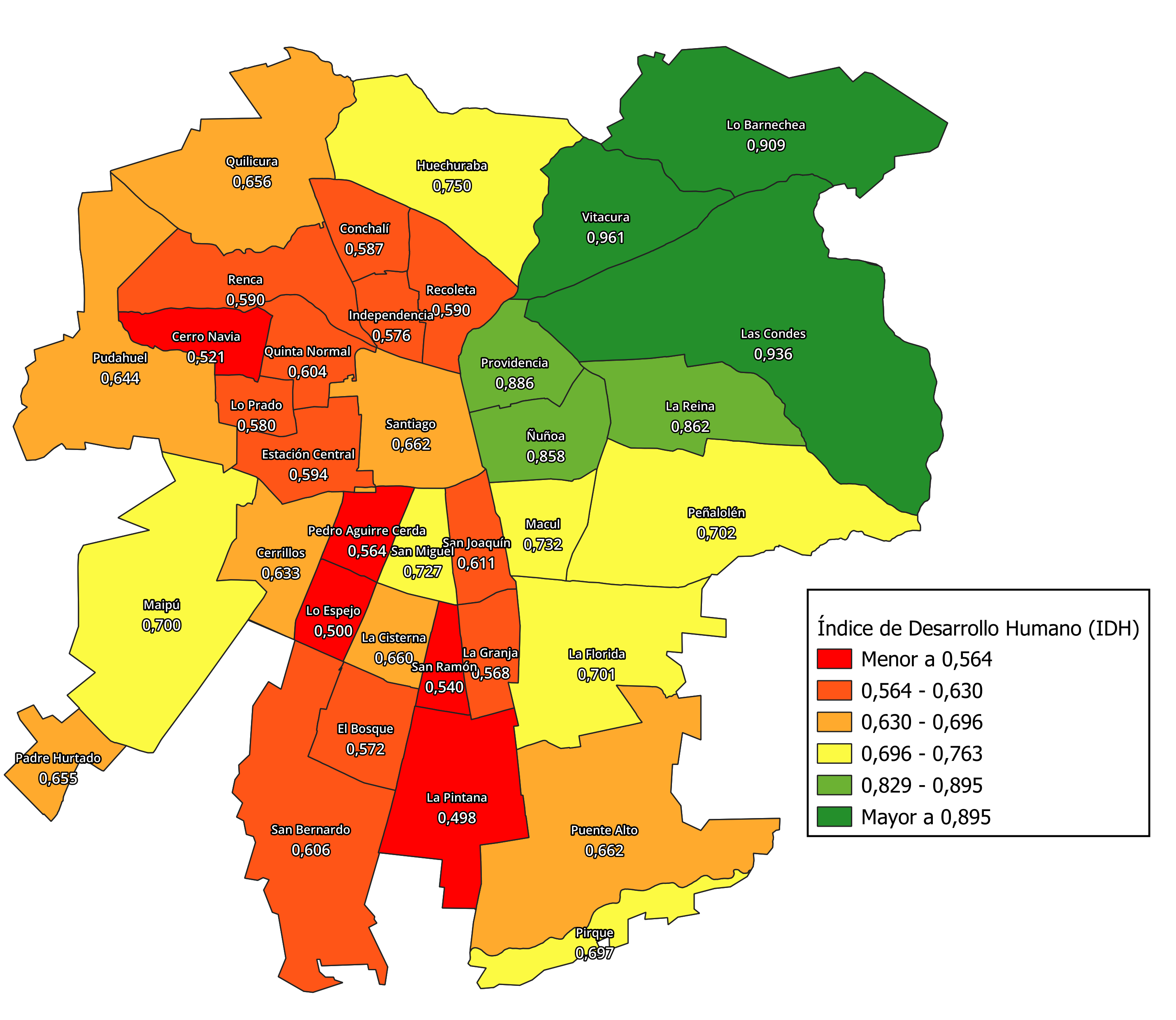
Human Development Index of Santiago in 2022.

The northeastern zone of Santiago de Chile, known as "sector oriente", refers to the name given to the communes to the east of the Santiago commune, where the majority of the population with the highest income in Chile live. It is made up of the communes of Lo Barnechea, Vitacura, Las Condes, Providencia, La Reina, and Ñuñoa.

Historically, this sector has contained a large part of the upper middle classes and upper classes of Santiago. In 2002 it had 45.3% of its population in the socioeconomic group "ABC1" equivalent to the classes previously mentioned, and 31% in the group "C2" (middle). The communes of the northeast sector lead the Human Development Index (HDI) not only at the city level, but also at the national level, being among the 6 highest of the 346 communes in the country. In the same way, the sector as a whole contains the highest average cost in the price of housing and offices per square meter in the country, due to the high price of urban land in the area. They also lead the national ranking. Carried out in a 2015 study, the communes are the best in quality of urban life index, and with the highest availability of green areas in the city, as long as other services. Also, due to its pre-Andean orientation, it is called the "upper neighborhood of Santiago". Popularly, the expression "upwards from Plaza Italia" marks the division between the eastern sector and the rest of the city in an east and west direction and socially.

According to an article published by the scientific journal PLOS One in 2021, its inhabitants tend to behave as if they were an ethnic minority, reflected by the composition of their surnames, corresponding mainly to the Castilian-Basque aristocracy, as in the ten highest average status from Santiago: Aldunate, Errázuriz, García-Huidobro, Irarrázaval, Izquierdo, Larraín, Schmidt, Tagle, Undurraga and Vial. It has a greater variety of surnames than the rest of Santiago, and Chileans of European ancestry mainly live here. From a political point of view, its residents are inclined significantly more to the right of the spectrum than the rest of the city and the country. In the 2020 constitutional plebiscite, the communes of Las Condes, Lo Barnechea, Vitacura (the richest in the country) were the only urban communes nationwide where the Rejection option won, while the sector as a whole obtained 55.4% of the votes in favor of Approval, well below 78.3% of the national total. In soccer, they are mainly supporters of the Club Deportivo Universidad Católica, installed in Las Condes.

== Demographics ==
The zone had 929,158 inhabitants, according to the Chilean census of 2017, to which is added a large floating population who travel daily to the sector for work, studies or services, especially to Providencia and Las Condes through Providencia Avenue and Apoquindo Avenue, which are the main commercial and transport axis of the city and the continuation of the Alameda from downtown. Together covering the 40% of total motorized journeys in the city. Likewise, in the communal limit of Las Condes, Providencia and Vitacura is located the financial sector of Sanhattan, which has experienced significant growth in high-rise buildings destined mainly for offices and trade.

Communes	Population 2017	Households^{?}	Area (Km²)	Density in 2017	Population growth^{?}	HDI 2017^{?}	Poverty in 2013^{?}
La Reina	92,787	25,768	23	4284.27	-4.6	0.950	1.3
Las Condes	294,838	82,099	99.4	3327.56	15.4	0.970	1.3
Lo Barnechea	105,833	16,124	1044.3	118.85	33.3	0.924	4.2
Ñuñoa	208,237	54,692	16.9	14,804.26	20.2	0.956	0.6
Providencia	142,079	51,183	14.4	10,954.79	12.6	0.967	3.0
Vitacura	85,384	23,878	28.3	3419.58	4.7	0.987	0.3
Total	929,158	253,744	1226.7	863.95	12.9	0.959	1.78

== Transportation ==
On 22 July 2022, the first part of the Vespucio Oriente Highway was inaugurated, which runs from La Reina to north at Avenida El Salto in Huechuraba across much of Las Condes and Vitacura. Likewise, the Parque Vespucio Oriente was reopened, increasing the square meters of green areas, and incorporating a high-standard bike lane. The second part of the highway is still pending and would significantly help La Reina, Ñuñoa and Peñalolén, in addition to connecting with the Autopista Vespucio Sur at Rotonda Grecia in Peñalolen, thus closing the ring road as a highway in 2026.

Currently, the mega infrastructure project corresponding to Line 7 of the Santiago Metro is under construction, which would begin on Avenida Estoril on the border of Las Condes and Vitacura, across Avenida Kennedy continuing through Avenida Providencia to Downtown Santiago. It would be operational by the year 2027 and would include nine new stations for the eastern sector.
