= Peñalolén =

- Commune
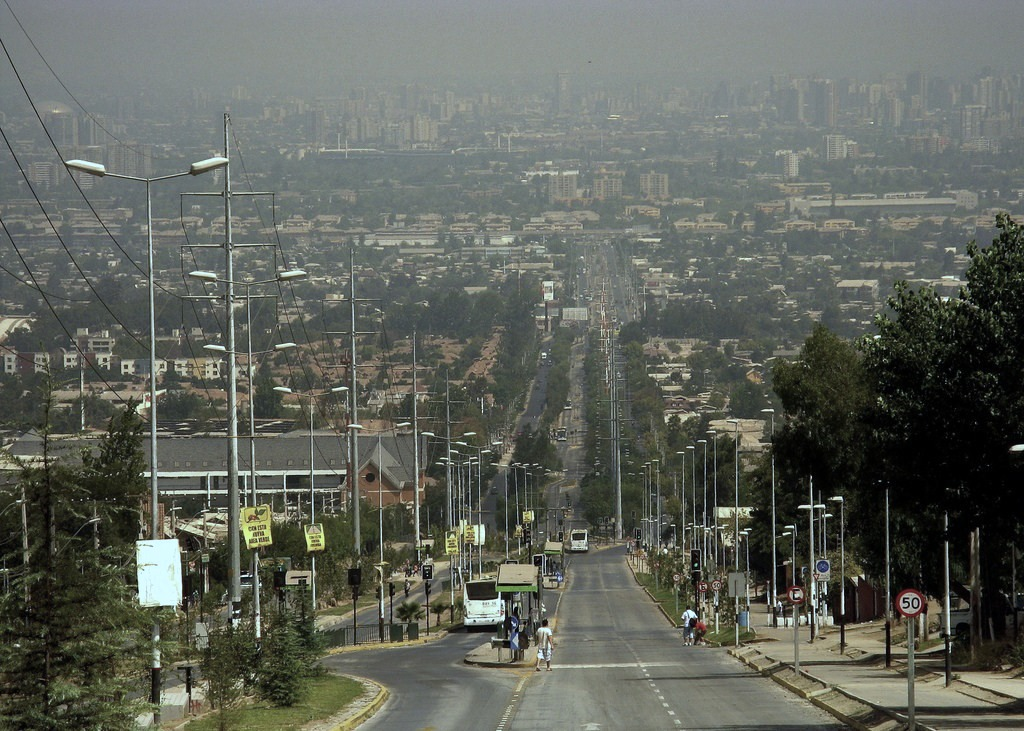
- Avenida Grecia, looking to west

- Flag Coat of arms Map of Peñalolén commune in Greater Santiago Location in Chile
- Coordinates (city): 33°29′S 70°33′W
- Country: Chile
- Region: Santiago Metropolitan
- Province: Santiago
- Established: 15 November 1984

Government
  - Type: Municipality
  - Alcalde: Miguel Concha Manso (FA)

Area
  - Total: 54.2 km^{2} (20.9 sq mi)

Population (2024)
  - Total: 236,478
  - Density: 4,360/km^{2} (11,300/sq mi)
- Time zone: UTC-4 (CLT)
  - Summer (DST): UTC-3 (CLST)
- Area code: 56 +
- Website: Municipality of Peñalolén

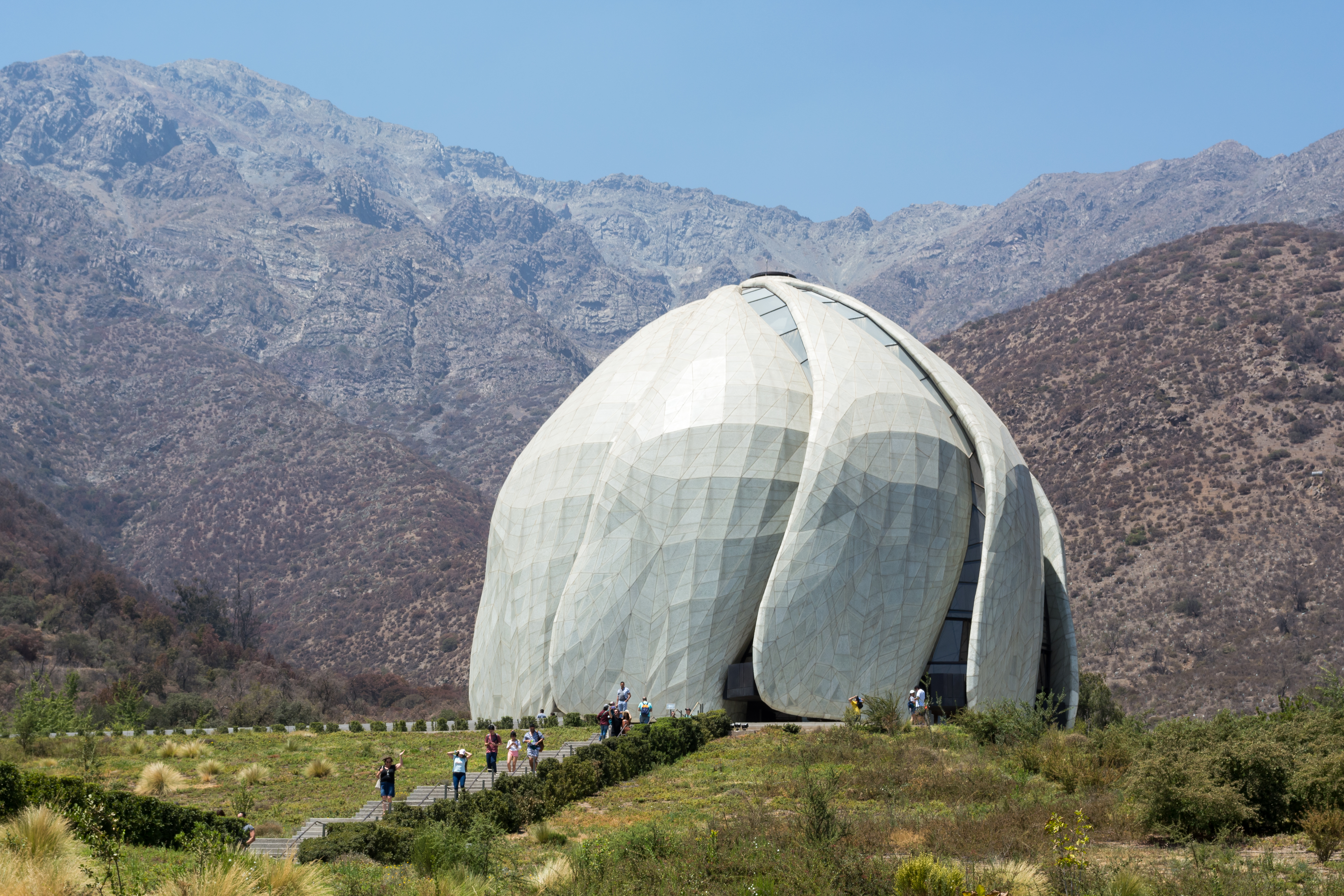
Santiago Bahá'í Temple.

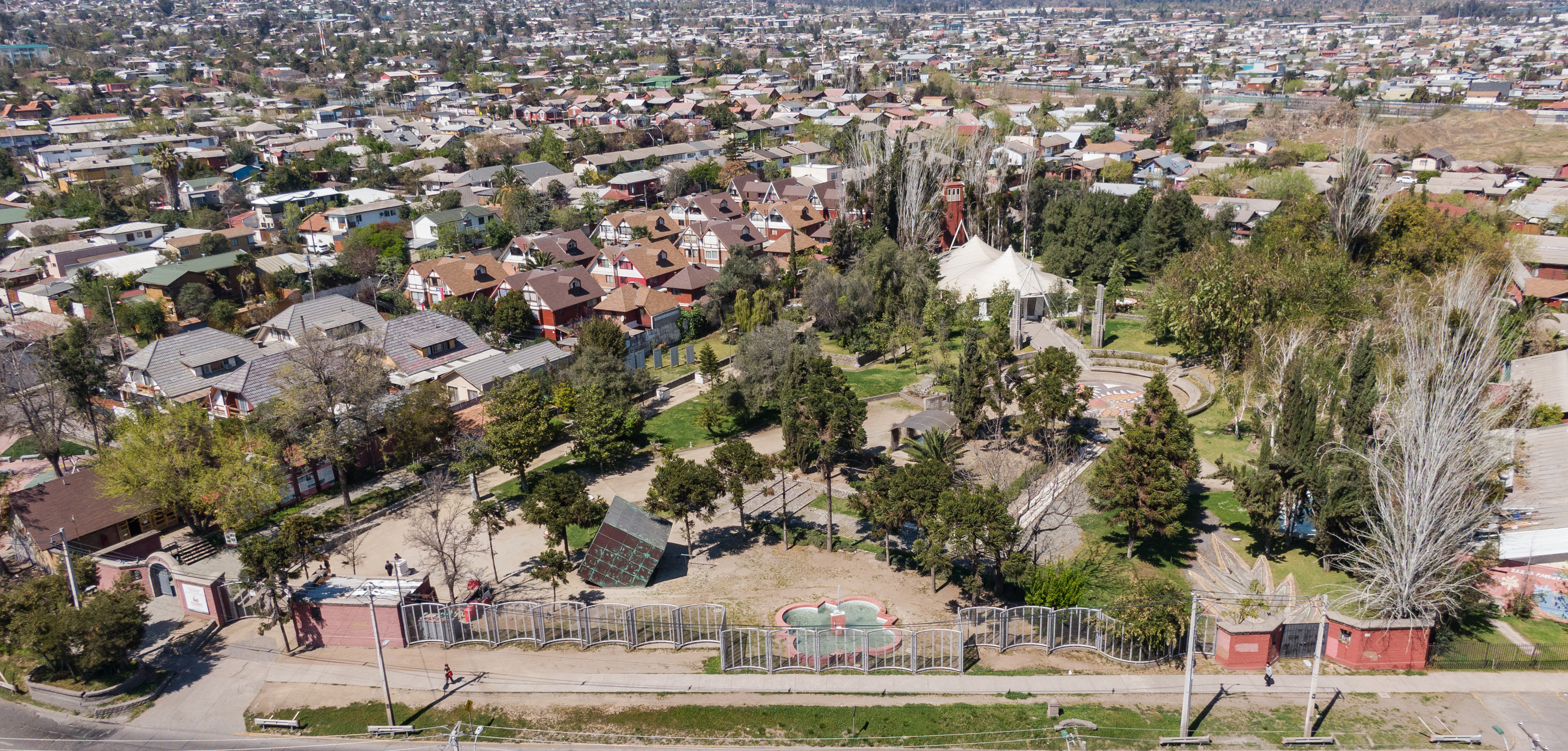
Peace Park Villa Grimaldi.

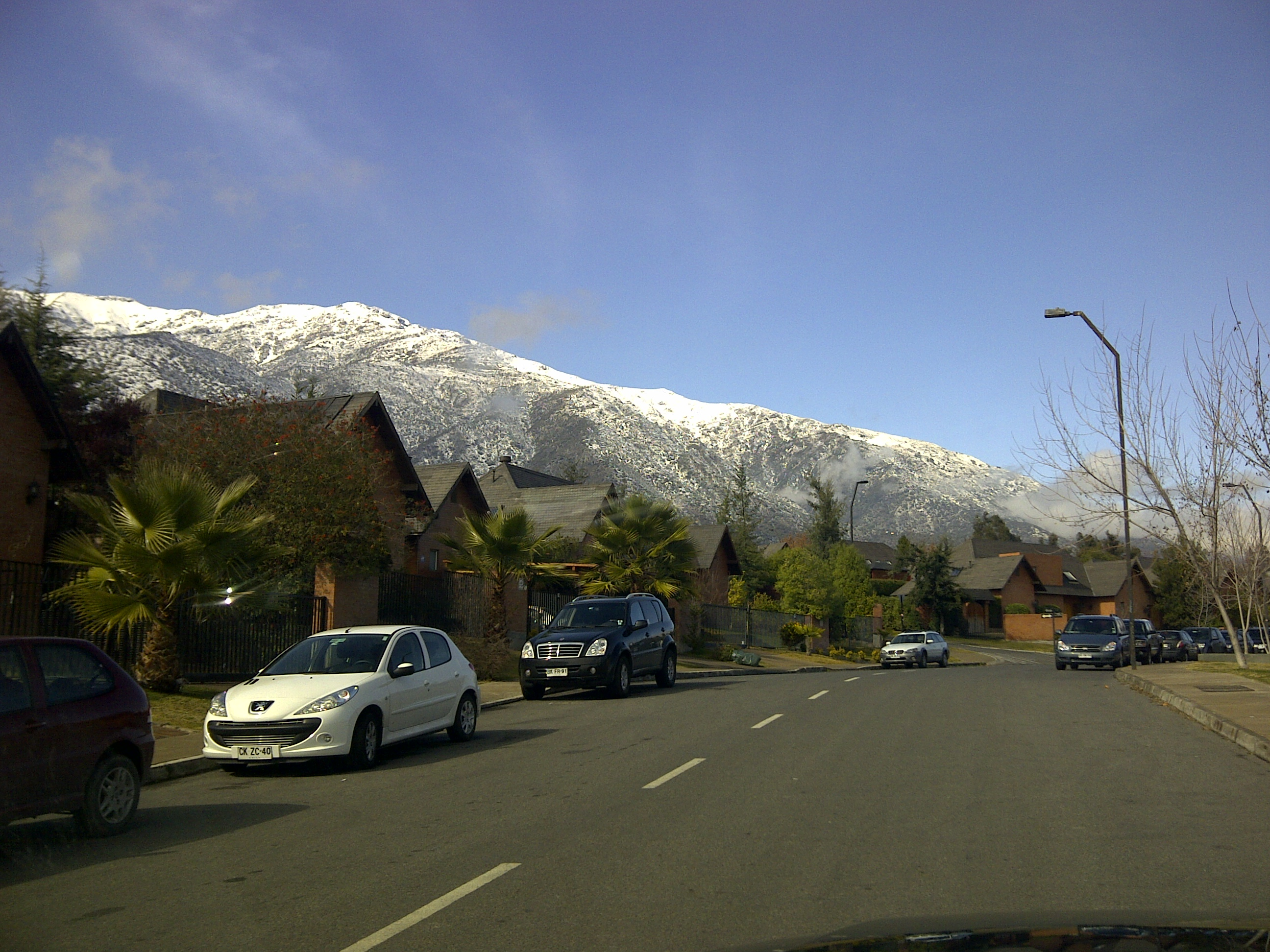
Las Pircas neighborhood

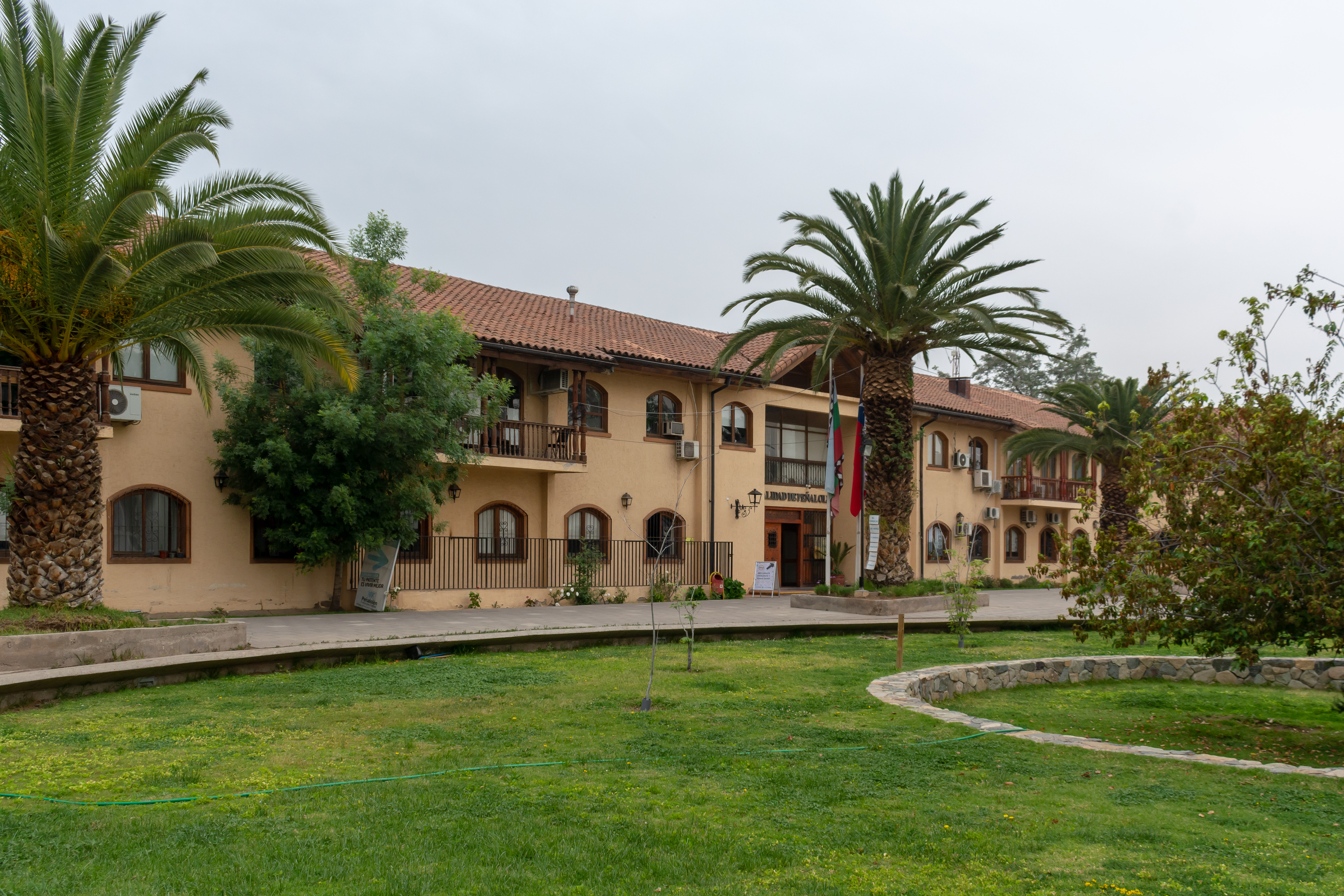
Municipality of Peñalolén

Peñalolén (From Mapudungun, meaning "fraternal meeting place") is a commune of Greater Santiago, in Santiago Province in the Santiago Metropolitan Region in Chile. It was founded on 15 November 1984. It has 236,478 inhabitants.

It is one of the most segregated areas of Santiago with Pre-Cordillera areas such as Las Pircas, Casablanca, and Penalolen Alto having a large upper-middle to high income population similar to Las Condes or Vitacura, while the lower areas are more working-class.

== History ==
The commune was founded on 15 November 1984. In 2019, Chilean police arrested a local family, accusing them of drug trafficking. The Peñalolén organization was reported to be one of the largest in the Santiago area, operating throughout the city.

== Administration ==
As a commune, Peñalolén is a third-level administrative division of Chile administered by a municipal council, headed by an alcalde (mayor) who is directly elected every four years. The 2024-2028 alcalde is Miguel Concha Manso (FA). The communal council has the following members:

- Sebastián Villouta Seguel (REP)
- Valentina Escobar Petit (REP)
- Ignacio Sánchez Pino (RN)
- Carla Caro Figueroa (RN)
- Begoña Torres Kurth (UDI)
- Cristián Jofré Delgado (PPD)
- Iván Tapia Peñaloza (FA)
- Daniela López Awad (FA)
- Claudio Hernández Olivares (PH)
- Juan Cantuarias Cantuarias (PS)

=== Mayors ===
Since 1984, Peñalolén has had six mayors:

- María Angélica Cristi (1984–1989, appointed by Pinochet)
- Carlos Alarcón (1989–1993, appointed by Aylwin)
- Carlos Echeverría (1993–1996)
- Carlos Alarcón (1997–2004)
- Claudio Orrego (2004-2012)
- Carolina Leitao (2012–2024)
- Miguel Concha Manso (2024-)

=== Parliamentary representation ===
Peñalolén belongs to Electoral District No. 11 together with the communes of Lo Barnechea, Las Condes, La Reina and Vitacura and to the VII Senatorial Circunscription (Santiago Metropolitan Region).

It is represented in the Chamber of Deputies of the National Congress for the period 2022-2026 by the following deputies:

- Guillermo Ramírez (UDI)
- Gonzalo de la Carrera Correa (IND)
- Cristián Araya Lerdo de Tejada (REP)
- Catalina del Real Mihovilovic (RN)
- Francisco Undurraga Gazitúa (EVO)
- Tomás Hirsch Goldschmidt (Humanist Action)

In the Senate is represented for the period 2022-2030 by the following senators:

- Fabiola Campillai (IND)
- Manuel José Ossandón (RN)
- Rojo Edwards (IND)
- Luciano Cruz-Coke (EVO)
- Claudia Pascual (PCCh)

== Demographics ==
As of the 2024 census, the population is 236,478, of which 48.3% are males, and 51.7% are females. People aged under 15 years old make up 17.0% of the population, and people aged 65 years old and over make up 13.3%.

Historical population
Year	Pop.	±% p.a.
1970	50,983	—
1982	137,298	+8.61%
1992	179,781	+2.73%
2002	216,060	+1.86%
2017	241,599	+0.75%
2024	236,478	−0.31%
Source: INE, Memoria Chilena

- Average annual household income: US$43,856 (PPP, 2006)
- Population below poverty line: 8.7% (2006)
- Regional quality of life index: 74.35, medium, 26 out of 52 (2005)
- Human Development Index: 0.743, 52 out of 341 (2003)

=== Ethnic minorities ===
As of the 2024 census, Indigenous peoples make up 10.4% of the population, and Afro-Chileans make up 0.9%.

=== Religion ===
As of the 2024 census, 66.4% of the population over 15 years old are Christians (49.3% Catholics, 13.9% Evangelicals or Protestants, and 3.1% other branches), 0.2% are Jews, 0.05% are Muslims, 0.1% are Buddhists, 0.02% are Hinduists, 0.9% are adrehents of other religions, and 32.3% are irreligious.

=== Immigration ===
As of the 2024 census, immigrants make up 8.5% of the population – 7.6% are from South America, 0.6% from North America, 0.2% from Europe, 0.1% from Asia, 0.01% from Africa, and 0.01% from Oceania.

== University ==
- Universidad Adolfo Ibáñez
