= Raúl Torrealba =

Chilean politician

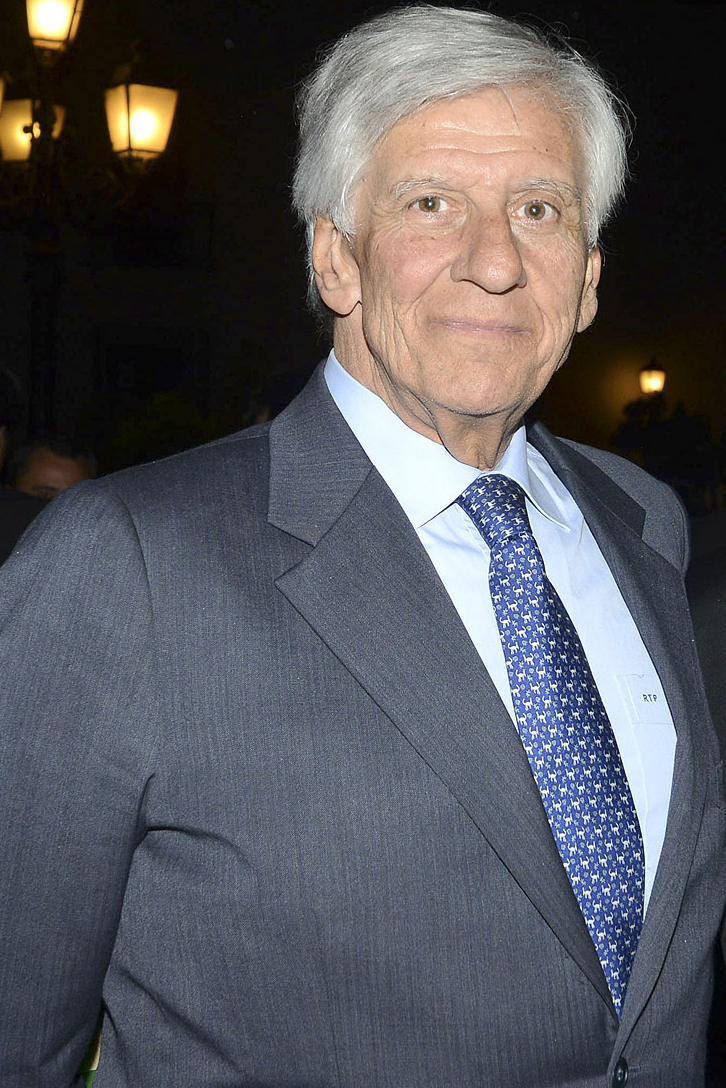

Mayor of Vitacura
- In office 6 December 1996 – 28 July 2021
- Preceded by: Patricia Alessandri
- Succeeded by: Camila Merino

Councilman of Las Condes
- In office 26 September 1992 – 6 December 1996

Personal details
- Born: 4 December 1948 (age 77) Puente Alto, Chile
- Party: National Renewal (RN) (1987–2021)
- Spouse: María Soledad Simonetti
- Children: Four
- Relatives: Sebastián Torrealba (nephew)
- Education: University of Chile (No degree)
- Occupation: Politician

Raúl Fernando Torrealba del Pedregal (born 4 December 1948) is a Chilean politician who served as mayor of Vitacura, a commune in Santiago.
