= Sebastián Torrealba =

Chilean politician (born 1981)

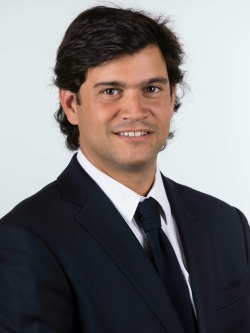

Member of Chamber of Deputies
- In office 11 March 2018 – 11 March 2022
- Preceded by: Creation of the District
- Constituency: District 10

Personal details
- Born: 6 February 1981 (age 45) Santiago, Chile
- Party: Renovación Nacional (RN)
- Relatives: Raúl Torrealba (uncle)
- Education: University for Development; Adolfo Ibáñez University (MA)
- Profession: Political scientist

Sebastián Torrealba Alvarado (born 6 February 1981) is a Chilean politician.
