= Camila Merino =

Chilean politician and civil engineer

Camila Merino Catalán
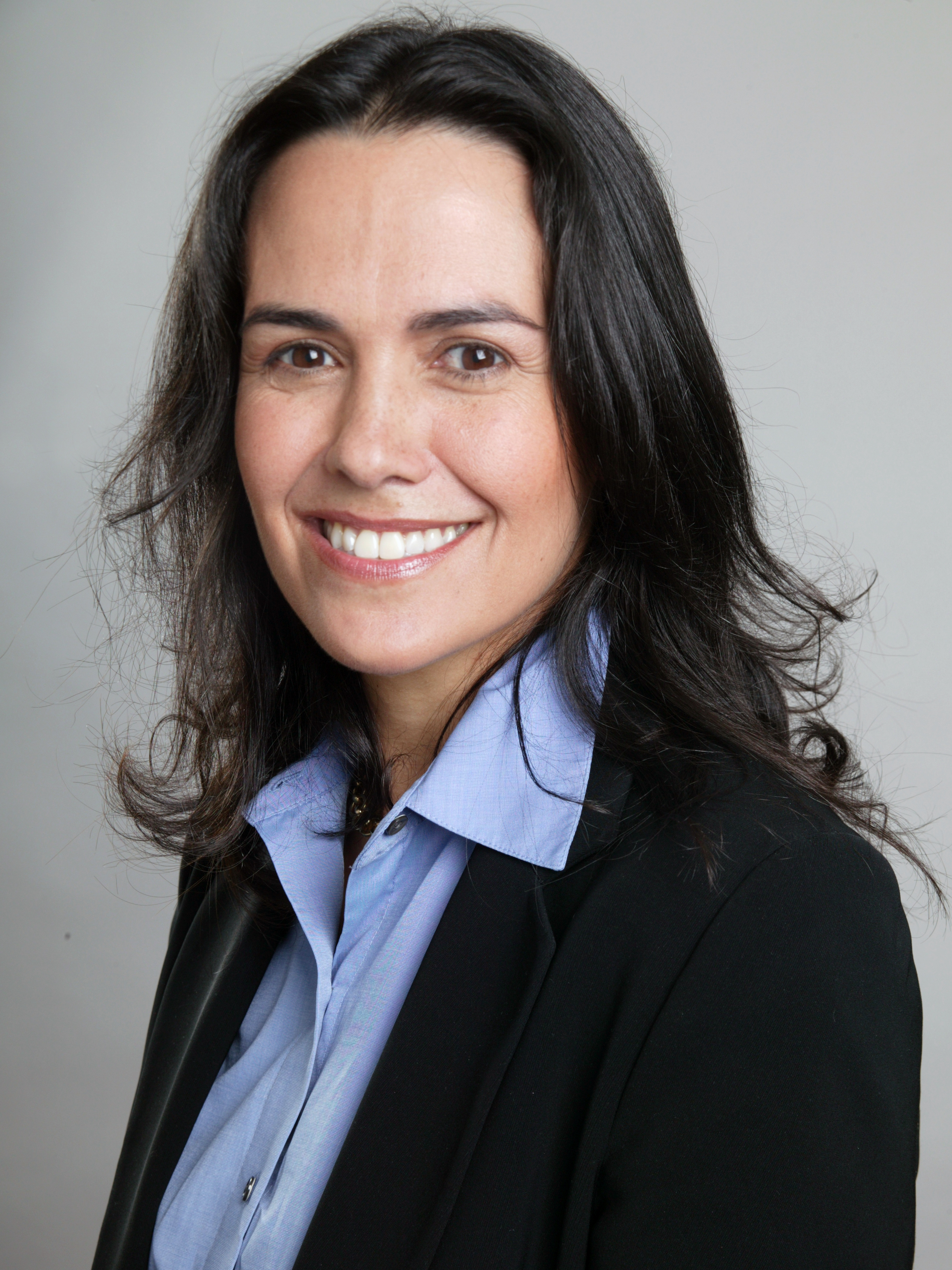

Mayor of Vitacura
- Incumbent
- Assumed office 28 June 2021
- Preceded by: Raúl Torrealba

Ministry of Labor and Social Provision
- In office 11 March 2010 – 14 January 2011
- President: Sebastián Piñera
- Preceded by: Claudia Serrano
- Succeeded by: Evelyn Matthei

Personal details
- Born: 21 September 1967 (age 59) Concepción, Chile
- Party: Evópoli
- Spouse: Enrique Elsaca Hirmas
- Children: Four
- Education: Pontifical Catholic University of Chile (BS); MIT Sloan School of Management (MS)
- Occupation: Politician
- Profession: Industrial engineer

Camila Merino Catalán is an industrial engineer, former Minister of Labor and Social Welfare for Chile, and current Mayor of Vitacura.

She served as minister during the first administration of President Sebastián Piñera. Since June 2021, she has served as mayor of Vitacura for the 2021–2024 term and was re-elected for the 2024–2028 term.

== Early life and education ==
She was born in Concepción, Chile, the eldest of two siblings. She completed her secondary education at Colegio Charles de Gaulle in her hometown.

At the age of 17, she moved to Santiago to study industrial civil engineering at the Pontifical Catholic University of Chile (PUC), where she graduated with a specialization in electricity.

She holds a Master of Business Administration (MBA) from the MIT Sloan School of Management in the United States and also pursued studies at the Institut d'Études Politiques de Paris (Sciences Po) in France.

She is married to Enrique Elsaca Hirmas, with whom she has four children. Elsaca has served as Vice President of Operations and Service at LAN Airlines and later as Corporate General Manager of Cementos Bío Bío.

== Professional career ==
In 1991, she joined Sociedad Química y Minera de Chile (SQM), where she worked for 14 years in various executive positions, including Vice President of Administration and Corporate Services, Human Resources, and Operations.

Due to her responsibilities at the mining company, she also served as director of the Asociación de Industriales de Antofagasta.

In December 2007, she was appointed General Manager of Metro de Santiago. During her tenure, she led the expansion of Lines 1 and 5 and implemented the Express Operation system during peak hours, increasing transport capacity and reducing travel times.

In October 2011, she joined Arauco as Corporate Manager of People, and in 2017 she became Vice President of the Forestry Business. She resigned in late September 2020 to pursue a public career as a candidate for mayor of Vitacura representing Evolución Política (Evópoli).

== Political career ==
She is a member of Evópoli and has participated in the party since its founding.

In March 2010, she assumed office as Minister of Labor and Social Welfare under the first administration of Sebastián Piñera. Her main priorities included employment and support programs in response to the 2010 earthquake (27F) and the establishment of a working group to improve occupational safety.

In November 2020, she was proclaimed as the Chile Vamos candidate for mayor of Vitacura in the 2021 municipal elections. She obtained 45.78% of the vote in the primary, defeating Max del Real (RN) and Pablo Zalaquett (UDI), who received 32% and 21%, respectively.

In the 2021 municipal election, she was elected mayor of Vitacura with 56.84% of the vote and assumed office on 28 June 2021, becoming the second woman to hold the position after Patricia Alessandri in 1994.

In the October 2024 municipal elections, she was re-elected as mayor of Vitacura with 81.19% of the vote, achieving the highest vote percentage in the Metropolitan Region and the third-highest nationwide.
