= Huayco =

Andean term for mountain flash floods

A huaico or huayco (Spanish pronunciation: [ˈwajko], from the Quechua wayqu, meaning "depth, valley") is an Andean term for the mudslide and flash flood caused by torrential rains occurring high in the mountains, especially during the weather phenomenon known as El Niño.

National forests such as the San Matías–San Carlos Protection Forest were created in Peru to protect vegetation, which reduces runoff, and prevent huaicos.

The indigenous Mapuche residents of Lo Barnechea, in present-day Santiago Province, Chile, were called Huaicoches in their Mapudungun language: Huaico (flash flood) and che (people).

"Cabeça d'água" (lit. "Water head") is a term in Brazil describing similar phenomena. During orographic rain, rivers in mountain ranges are often struck by very rapid flooding, which produces a downward wave that can carry large river rocks, vegetation, and people. Several fatalities have been recorded due to "water heads", usually of people not familiar with local conditions.
