= Vitacura =

- Commune
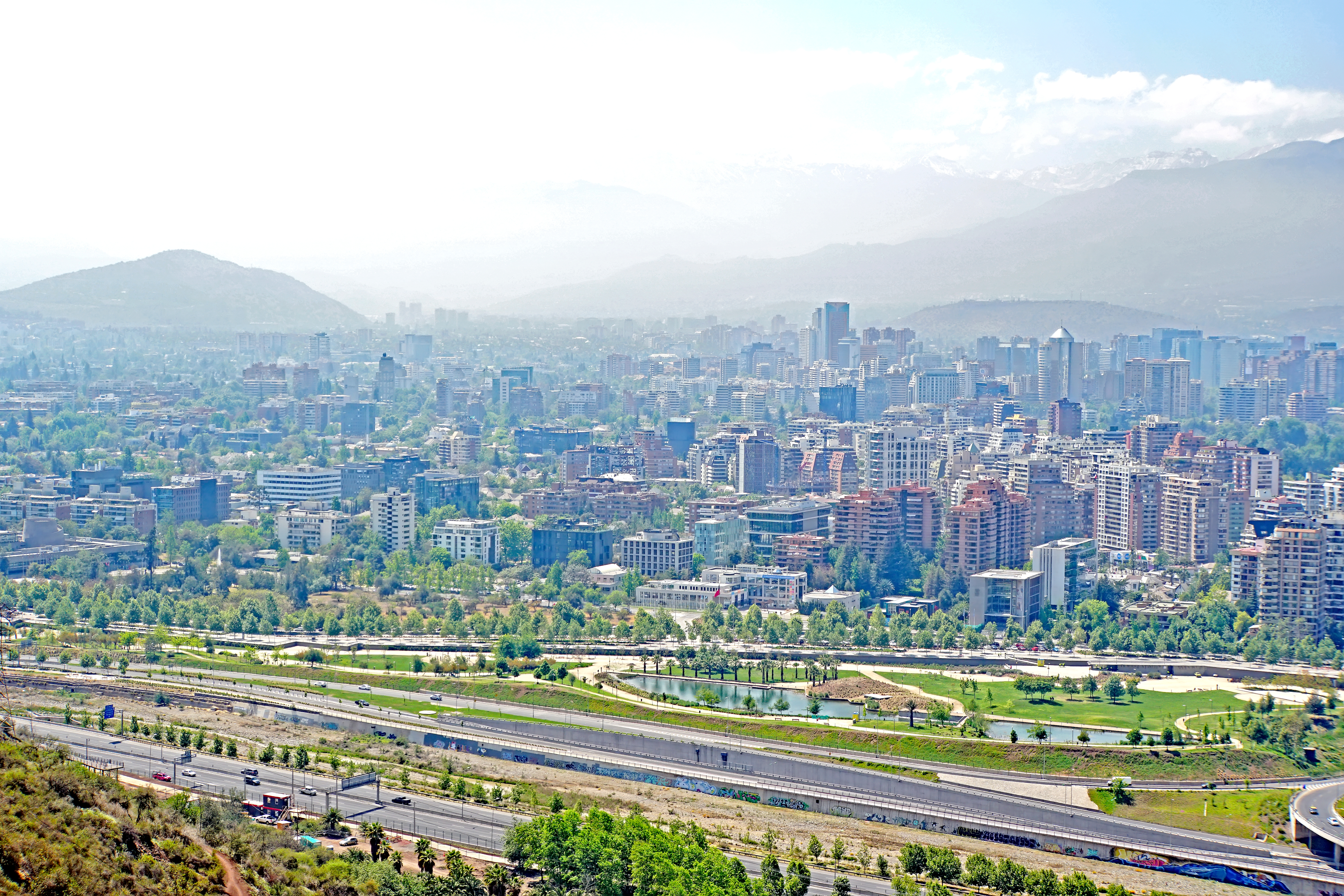
- View of Vitacura

- Flag Map of the Vitacura commune within Greater Santiago Location in Chile
- Coordinates (city): 33°23′00″S 70°34′30″W
- Country: Chile
- Region: Santiago Metropolitan Region
- Province: Santiago
- Founded: 9 March 1946

Government
  - Type: Municipality
  - Alcalde: Camila Merino (Evópoli)

Area
  - Total: 28.3 km^{2} (10.9 sq mi)

Population (2024)
  - Total: 86,420
  - Density: 3,050/km^{2} (7,910/sq mi)
  - Urban: 86,420
  - Rural: 0
- Time zone: UTC-4 (CLT)
  - Summer (DST): UTC-3 (CLST)
- Area code: 56 +
- Website: Municipality of Vitacura

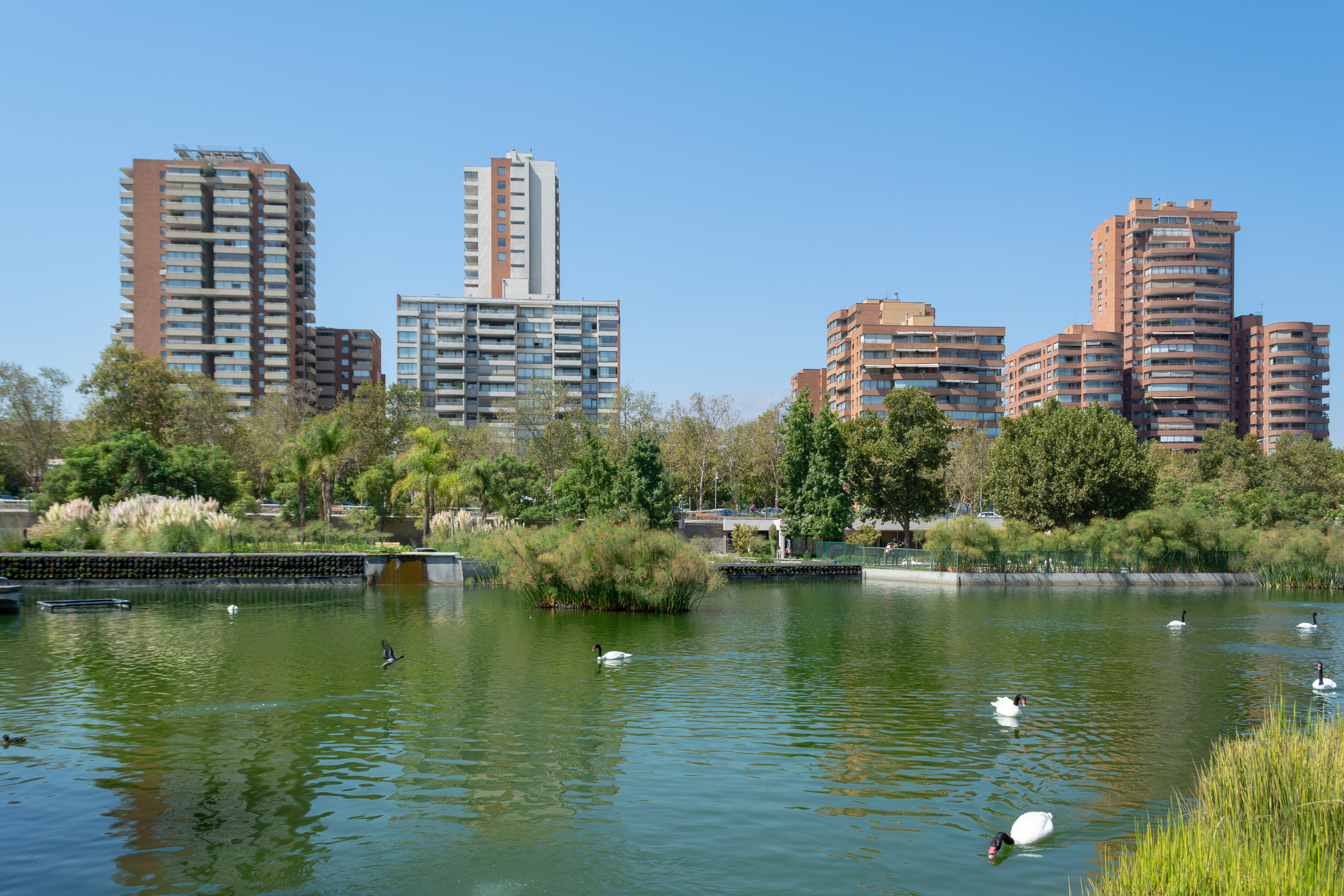
Lake and buildings in Bicentennial Park

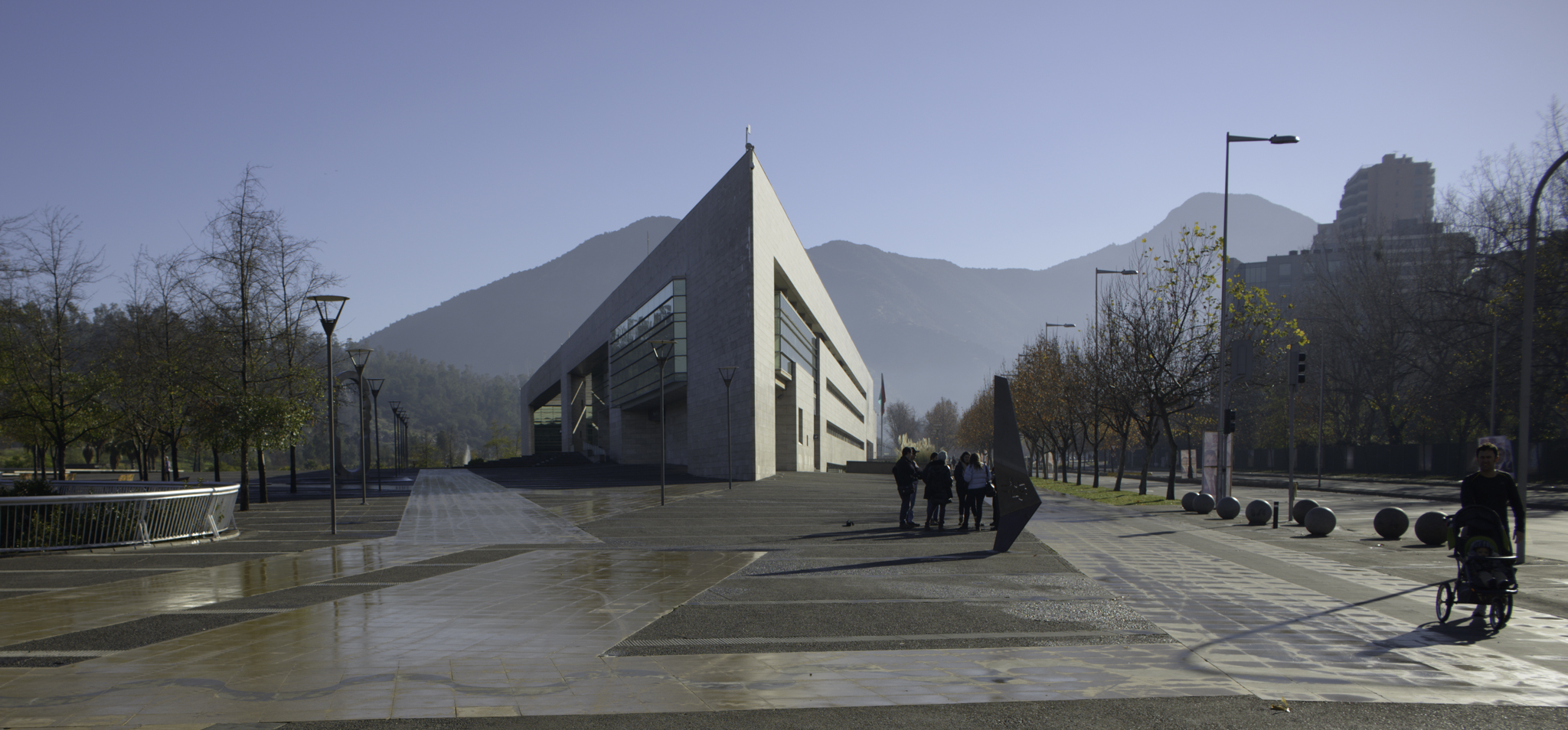
City hall

Vitacura is a commune in the Santiago Province of the Santiago Metropolitan Region in Chile. It is one of the most expensive and fashionable areas of Santiago. Inhabitants are primarily high income families. It belongs to the Northeastern zone of Santiago de Chile. It has 86,420 inhabitants.

There is an abundance of elite private schools in Vitacura and Las Condes, including Saint George's College, Colegio Santa Úrsula, Alliance Francaise, Colegio La Maisonette, Colegio Tabancura, Colegio Los Andes, Colegio Sagrados Corazones de Manquehue and Colegio San Benito.

The Costanera Norte tollway connects Vitacura with the international airport and subway stations are located in the neighboring municipality of Las Condes.

Vitacura is the site of ECLAC headquarters, home to the European Southern Observatory (ESO) headquarters in Chile, and home to Santiago's most exclusive shopping street, Avenida Alonso de Córdova.

== Demographics ==
As of the 2024 census, the population is 86,420, of which 46.2% are male and 53.8% are female. People under 15 years old make up 17.4% of the population, and people over 65 years old make up 19.2%. 100% of the population is urban.

Historical population
Year	Pop.	±% p.a.
1970	40,343	—
1982	72,038	+4.95%
1992	79,375	+0.97%
2002	81,499	+0.26%
2017	85,384	+0.31%
2024	86,420	+0.17%
Source: INE, Memoria Chilena

- Autonomous household income per capita: US$86,155 (PPP, 2006)
- Population below poverty line: 4.4% (±2.5%) (2006)
- Regional quality of life index: 86.74 (high), ranked 3rd out of 52 communes (2005)
- Human Development Index: 0.949, ranked 1st out of 341 communes (2003)

=== Immigration ===
As of the 2024 census, immigrants make up 10.9% of the population - 6.0% are from South America, 1.4% from North America, 2.5% from Europe, 0.7% from Asia, 0.1% from Africa, and 0.1% from Oceania.

== Administration ==
As a commune, Vitacura is a third-level administrative division of Chile administered by a municipal council, headed by a mayor (alcalde, in Spanish) who is directly elected every four years. The mayor Camila Merino (Evópoli) has been in the position since 2021. The communal council has the following members:

- Catalina Recordon Martín (RN)
- Verónica del Real Cardoen (REP)
- Felipe Morandé Lavín (Evópoli)
- Paula Domínguez Risopatron (Evópoli)
- Carlos Cruz-Coke Carvallo (RN)
- Ignacio Hue Wielandt (Ind/UDI)
- Catalina Vera Atria (REP)
- Joaquín Jerez Salvo (REP)

Vitacura belongs to Electoral District No. 11 together with the communes of Lo Barnechea, Las Condes, La Reina and Peñalolén and to the VII Senatorial District (Santiago Metropolitan Region).

It is represented in the Chamber of Deputies of the National Congress for the period 2022-2026 by the following deputies:

- Guillermo Ramírez (UDI)
- Gonzalo de la Carrera Correa (IND)
- Cristián Araya Lerdo de Tejada (REP)
- Catalina del Real Mihovilovic (RN)
- Francisco Undurraga Gazitúa (Evópoli)
- Tomás Hirsch Goldschmidt (Humanist Action)

== International relations ==
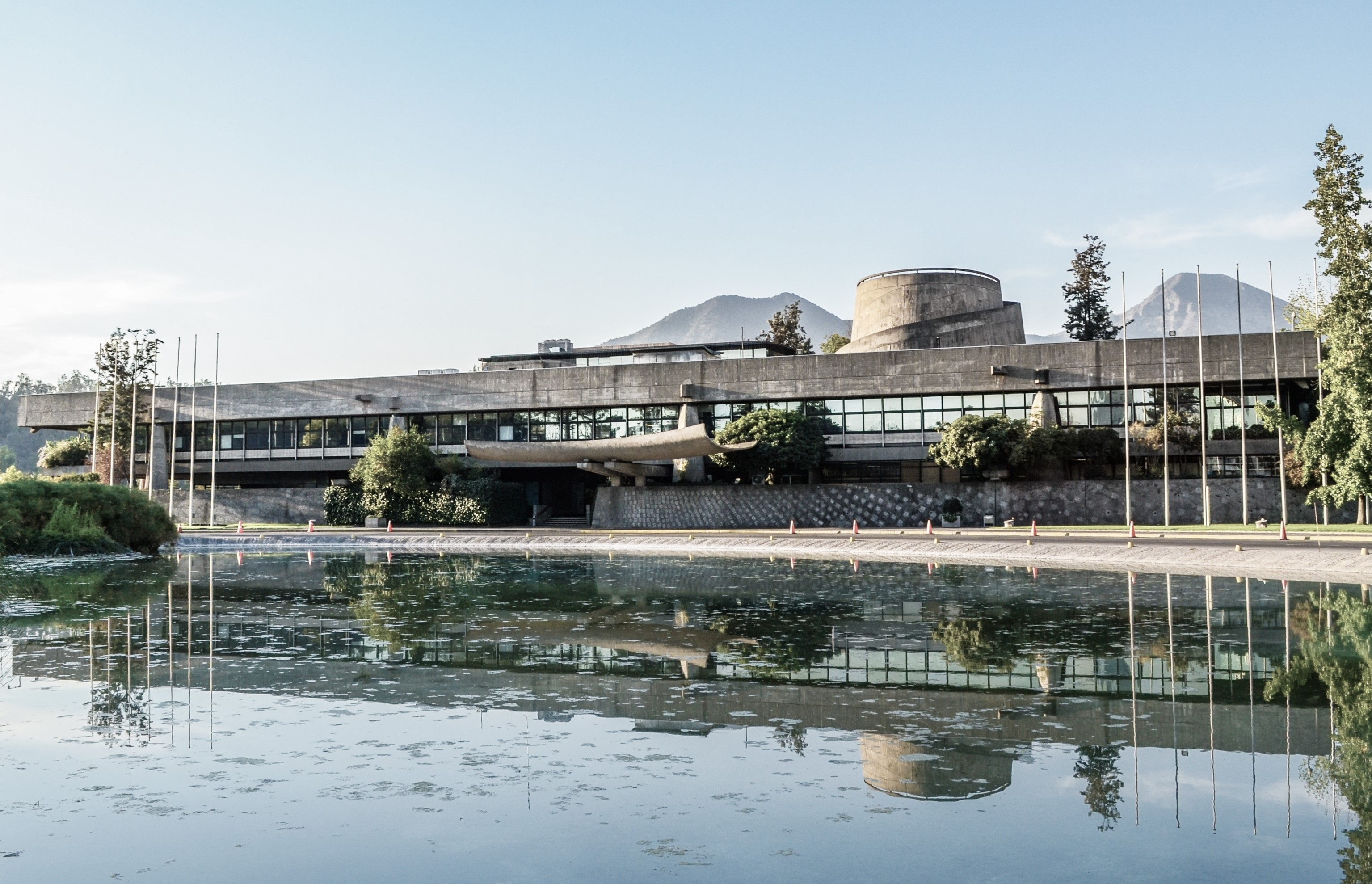
United Nations Economic Commission for Latin America and the Caribbean

=== International organizations ===
The commune is home to the International District of Vitacura (IDV), also known as the United Nations Santiago Complex, which serves as the Chilean national and Latin American regional headquarters for several international organizations associated with the United Nations (UN), including the Economic Commission for Latin America and the Caribbean (ECLAC), the Office of the United Nations High Commissioner for Refugees in Chile (UNHCR Chile), the South America regional office of the Office of the United Nations High Commissioner for Human Rights (OHCHR), the United Nations Resident Coordinator Office in Chile, the Latin America and the Caribbean regional office of the Food and Agriculture Organization (FAO-RLC), the International Labour Organization Southern Cone Office, the Pan American Health Organization (PAHO), the World Health Organization (WHO), the United Nations Development Programme in Chile (UNDP Chile), UN Women Chile, the International Telecommunication Union (ITU Chile), the World Food Programme (WFP Chile), the United Nations Population Fund (UNFPA Chile), and the national office of the United Nations Convention to Combat Desertification (UNCCD Chile).

In addition, the International District of Vitacura (IDV) is home to the European Organisation for Astronomical Research in the Southern Hemisphere (ESO Chile), while the national headquarters of CAF – Development Bank of Latin America and the Caribbean is currently under development. The complex will also host the Entrepreneurship and Innovation Center for Latin America and the Caribbean, jointly administered with the Municipality of Vitacura.

=== International trade and investment ===
In the field of international trade and investment, the main actors located in Vitacura include the Chilean-Chinese Chamber of Industry, Commerce and Tourism (CHICIT), the Chile-India Chamber of Commerce (CAMINDIA), and the Chilean-Uruguayan Chamber of Commerce.

=== Internationalization in higher education ===
In the field of international relations and higher education, the main institutions located in Vitacura include the Chilean office of the Latin American Faculty of Social Sciences (FLACSO Chile) and the International Relations Directorate of INACAP.

Vitacura is also home to Chilean representations of foreign universities, including the regional office of the David Rockefeller Center for Latin American Studies (DRCLAS) of Harvard University, Associated Universities, Inc. (AUI), and the Santiago Global Center of Columbia University.

=== Embassies ===
- Germany (Embassy)
- Dominican Republic (Embassy)
- Libya (Embassy)
- Russia (Embassy)
- Vietnam (Embassy)

== Shopping ==
This commune is one of the most expensive areas of Santiago and is known for its fashion as boutiques of many of the world's leading luxury retailers are located in Vitacura. These stores include Louis Vuitton, Armani, Tommy Hilfiger, Swarovski, Salvatore Ferragamo, Ermenegildo Zegna, Brooks Brothers, Hermès, MaxMara, Bang & Olufsen, and Hugo Boss, as well as many others.

== Health ==
Vitacura has access to a comprehensive healthcare network composed of public, private, and university-affiliated medical facilities, reflecting the commune's socioeconomic profile and its integration within the eastern sector of Greater Santiago's healthcare system.

Primary public healthcare services are provided through municipal health centers, while secondary and tertiary public care is generally accessed through hospitals located in neighboring communes operating under Chile's national public health system (FONASA).

Vitacura is also home to major private healthcare providers. Among the most prominent is Clínica Alemana de Santiago, one of Chile's largest private hospitals, which provides tertiary-level medical services, emergency care, advanced diagnostic services, and specialized treatments. The clinic serves residents of Vitacura as well as the wider Santiago metropolitan area.

Private healthcare services in the commune are commonly accessed through Chile's private health insurance system (ISAPREs). In addition, Vitacura hosts numerous specialized medical centers, outpatient clinics, and wellness facilities focused on preventive medicine, rehabilitation, and elderly care, contributing to health outcomes and quality-of-life indicators that are above national averages.

== Education ==
Vitacura hosts several international educational institutions serving both local and expatriate communities.

The main campus of the Lycée Antoine-de-Saint-Exupéry de Santiago, a French international school, is located in Vitacura.

The Deutsche Schule Santiago (German School of Santiago) operates its Vitacura campus for primary education, enrolling students from first through sixth grade. The institution also maintains additional campuses in Las Condes and Cerro Colorado for other educational levels.

Chartwell International School, a preschool and primary-level institution, is located in the Lo Curro sector of Vitacura.
