= Guillermo Ramírez (politician) =

Chilean politician (born 1979)

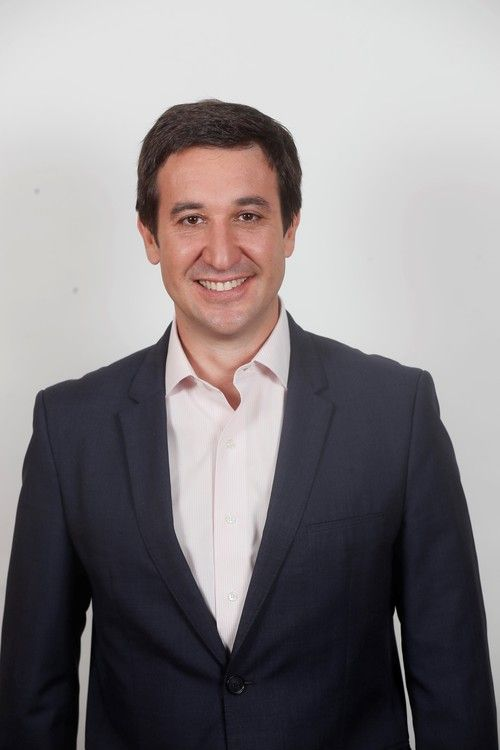
- Ramírez in 2022

Member of the Chamber of Deputies
- Incumbent
- Assumed office 11 March 2018
- Constituency: District 11 (2018–2026); District 9 (2026–present)

Personal details
- Born: 16 April 1979 (age 47)
- Party: Independent Democratic Union

Guillermo Andrés Ramírez Diez (born 16 April 1979) is a Chilean politician serving as a member of the Chamber of Deputies since 2018. He has served as president of the Independent Democratic Union since 2024.
