= Gonzalo de la Carrera =

Chilean politician (born 1962)

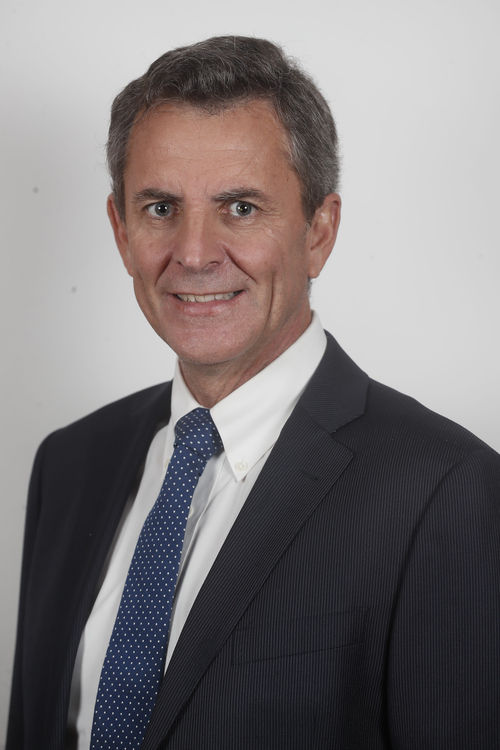

Member of the Chamber of Deputies of Chile
- In office 11 March 2022 – 11 March 2026
- Constituency: District 11

Personal details
- Born: Gonzalo Armando de la Carrera Correa; January 13, 1962 (age 64) Santiago, Chile
- Party: Evópoli (2016−2019); Republican Party (2019−2021); Independent (2021−2024); National Libertarian Party (2024−)
- Spouse: María Angélica Bezanilla
- Children: 6
- Education: Pontifical Catholic University of Chile
- Occupation: Politician
- Profession: Lawyer

Gonzalo Armando de la Carrera Correa (born 13 January 1962) is a Chilean politician who served in the Chamber of Deputies of Chile from 2022 to 2026 for the 11th District.

A member of the National Libertarian Party founded by Johannes Kaiser, he formerly was militant in José Antonio Kast's conservative Republican Party of Chile, and considered himself as liberal within the party's ranks. Similarly, he was a militant of Evópoli, party from which he resigned in 2019.

He was CEO of La Polar and vice-president of the ENAP.

== Biography ==
De la Carrera was born in Santiago on 13 January 1962 to Jaime de la Carrera, a civil engineer, and María Isabel Correa, a housewife. He relocated with his parents to the United States following the 1970 election of President Salvador Allende. He completed part of his primary education in the United States in a Florida public school, where he reported experiencing discrimination for being South American. He and his family later returned to Chile, during Pinochet's dictatorship, where he attended Craighouse School and Liceo 11 de Hombres de Las Condes, graduating from secondary education at Redland School in 1979. From 1981 and 1985, he studied Commercial Engineering at the Pontifical Catholic University of Chile. He married to María Angélica Bezanilla Mena and later separated. He is the father of six children. In August 2008, he lost his 16-year-old daughter, Trinidad, while she was on a school trip with Colegio Cumbres in Putre. On the day of the tragedy, he was accompanying former tennis player Fernando González at the US Open in New York.

From 1991 and 2004, De la Carrera served as the Latin American regional director for the cosmetics company Oriflame. He subsequently worked as the executive director of Recrear S.A. – Bioway S.A. from 2009 to 2012, and as the corporate manager of new business for Bethia S.A. from 2012 until February 2013.

Between 2012 and 2015, De la Carrera served as president of the private health insurer Isapre Colmena and president of Colmena Salud S.A. In 2013, he held the director's position at both the Association of Isapres and the Association of Regional Clinics, and served as clinic director of the Clínica San Carlos de Apoquindo until May 2014.

During the second administration of President Sebastián Piñera, he was appointed vice president of the state-owned National Petroleum Company (ENAP) on 27 March 2018, serving until his resignation on 5 September of that year.

== Political career ==
Originally a member of the center-right political party Evópoli, he resigned in 2019 and later joined the far-right Republican Party of Chile.

In the 2021 Chilean municipal elections he ran for mayor of Las Condes, as a candidate for the Republican Party of Chile, obtaining second place with 30.33% of the vote, but was not elected.

In the parliamentary elections of November 2021, he was elected to the Chamber of Deputies of Chile for the 11th District, representing the Republican Party within the Frente Social Cristiano (FSC) coalition. He received the highest vote total in the district, with 46,044 votes (11.16%).

In December 2021, he resigned from the Republican Party at the request of party leader José Antonio Kast. Since 2024, he has been a member of the National Libertarian Party and is one of the founders of the party alongside Gloria Naveillán. In 2023, he announced that he would not seek reelection as a Deputy in the 2025 parliamentary elections.

== Controversies ==
De la Carrera has been characterized as a persistent spreader of fake news and a promoter of hate speech through his social media networks.

On May 31, 2022, during a legislative session, De la Carrera argued with Deputy Daniel Manouchehri, accusing him of having a conflict of interest regarding the Dicom Law. (Note: A Chilean law that regulates how financial, commercial, and banking data can be collected, published, and used.) A video later surfaced revealing that De la Carrera had physically assaulted Manouchehri.

On August 30, 2022, after making an ironic comment against the Minister of the Interior, Izkia Siches, he was admonished. He then approached the rostrum of the chamber and began an altercation with the leadership of the Chamber of Deputies and Deputy Marcela Riquelme, calling the latter "stupid". Riquelme requested that the President of the Chamber, Raúl Soto, certify the events. Following a series of insults from De la Carrera, the first vice-president of the Lower House, Alexis Sepúlveda, intervened and was subsequently punched in the face by him. This action was widely condemned across the political spectrum, including by the Republican Party bench, which expelled De la Carrera from its ranks.

On October 5, 2022, during a session of the Chamber of Deputies, De la Carrera made remarks directed at Deputy Emilia Schneider, stating that, "respecting her condition", she could not demand the right to an abortion or the right to menstruate because she is transgender. The situation caused a significant backlash among government-aligned deputies, as well as right-wing and center-right deputies who rejected his statements. In the same context, De la Carrera accused Schneider's bench of being "feminazis".
