= List of monuments and memorials to Pope John Paul II =

This is a list of monuments and memorials to Pope John Paul II.

== Argentina ==
- Posadas

== Australia ==
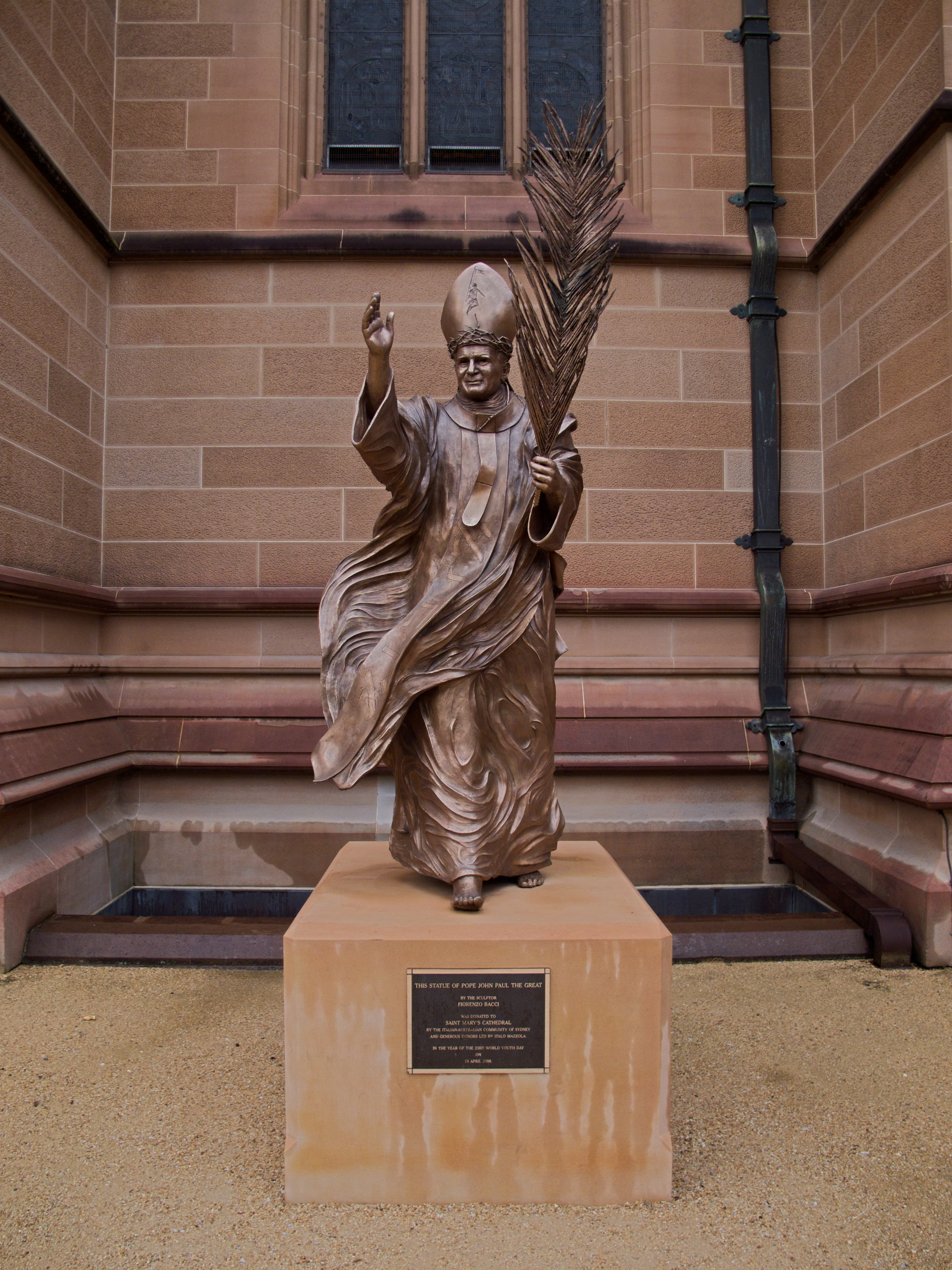
Sydney: St Mary's Cathedral

== Belarus ==
- Minsk

== Canada ==
- Toronto

== Chile ==
- John Paul II Park, Santiago
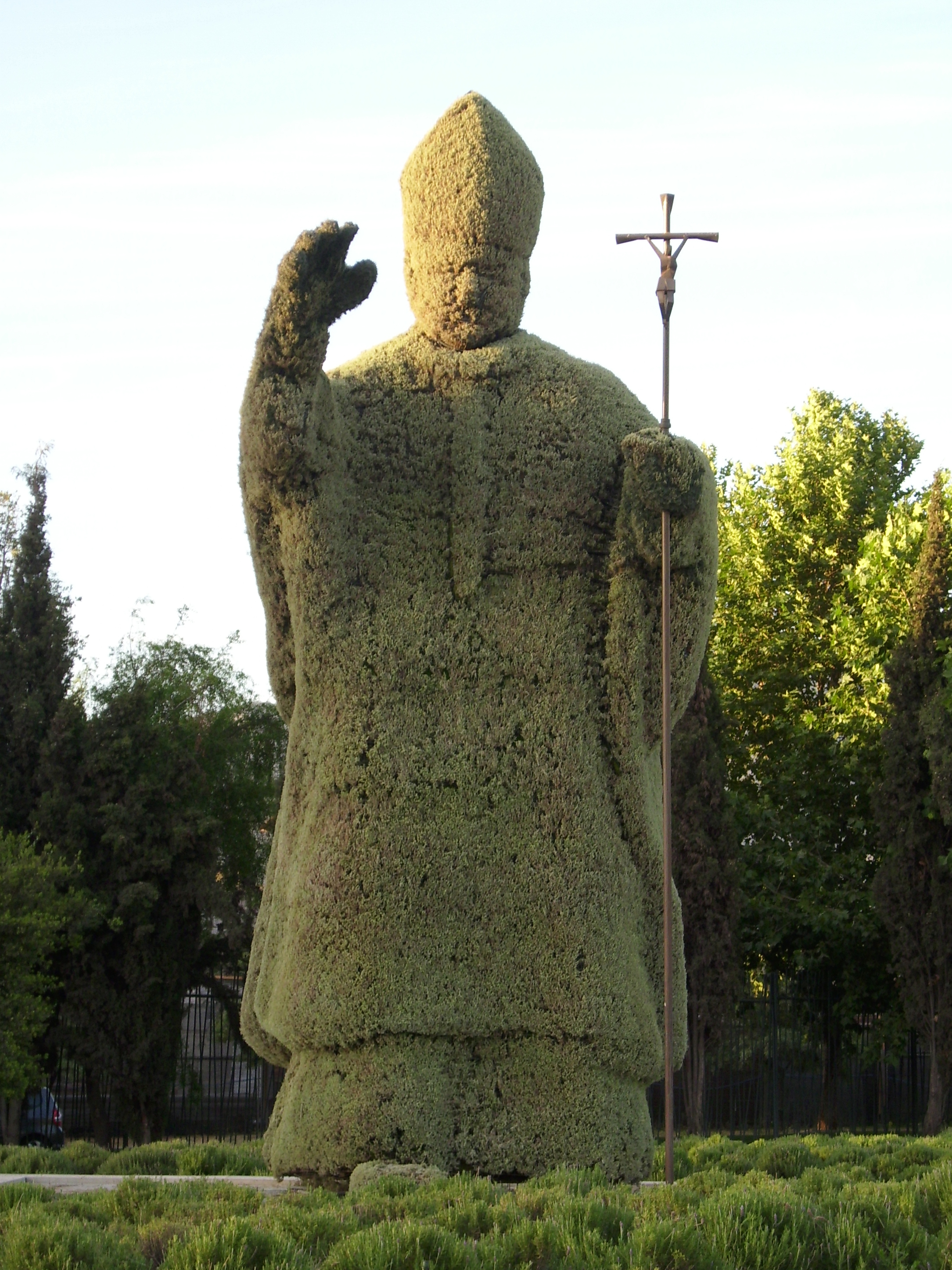

== Croatia ==
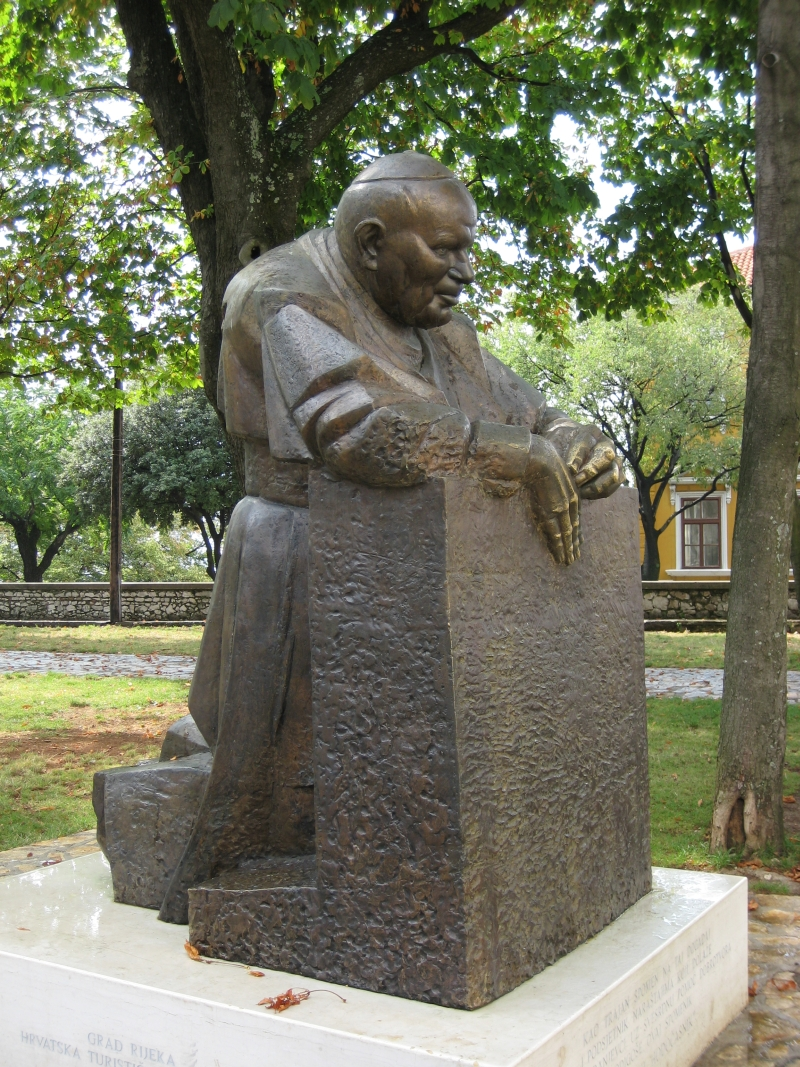
Trsat

== Ireland ==
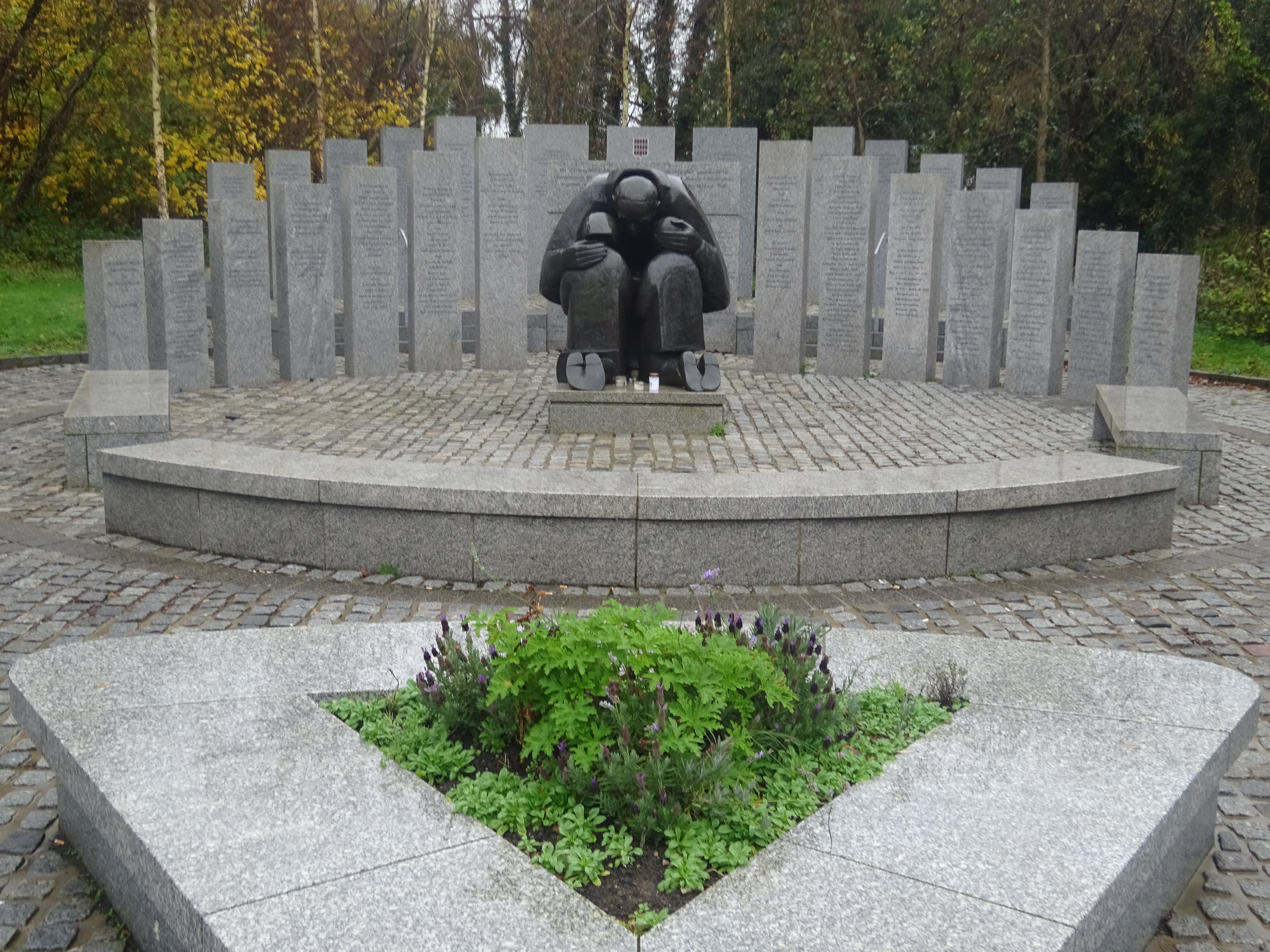
Maynooth University

== Italy ==
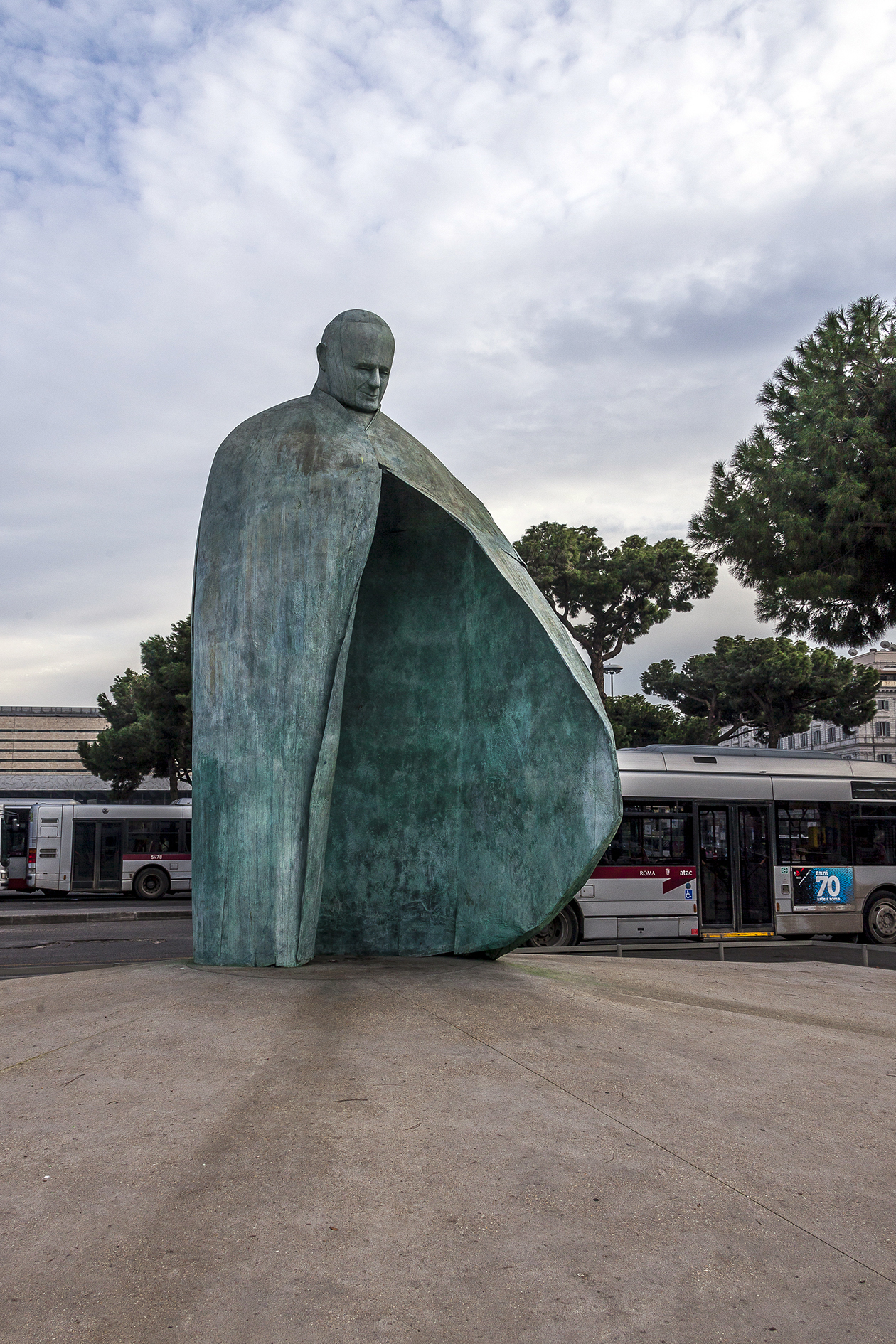
Rome: Conversations: Homage to John Paul II, Termini railway station

== Mexico ==
Mexico City

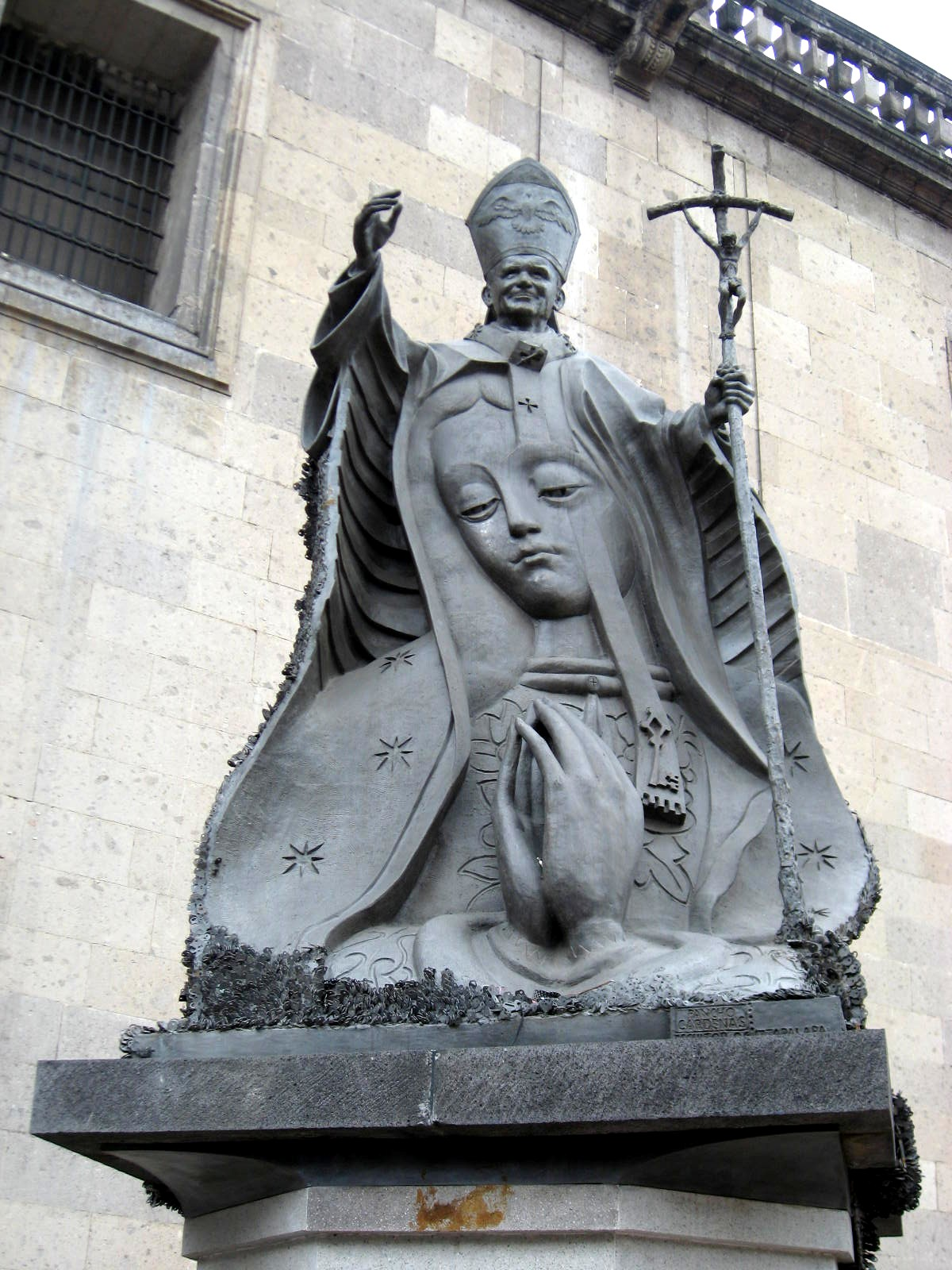
Keys of Faith, Mexico City Metropolitan Cathedral

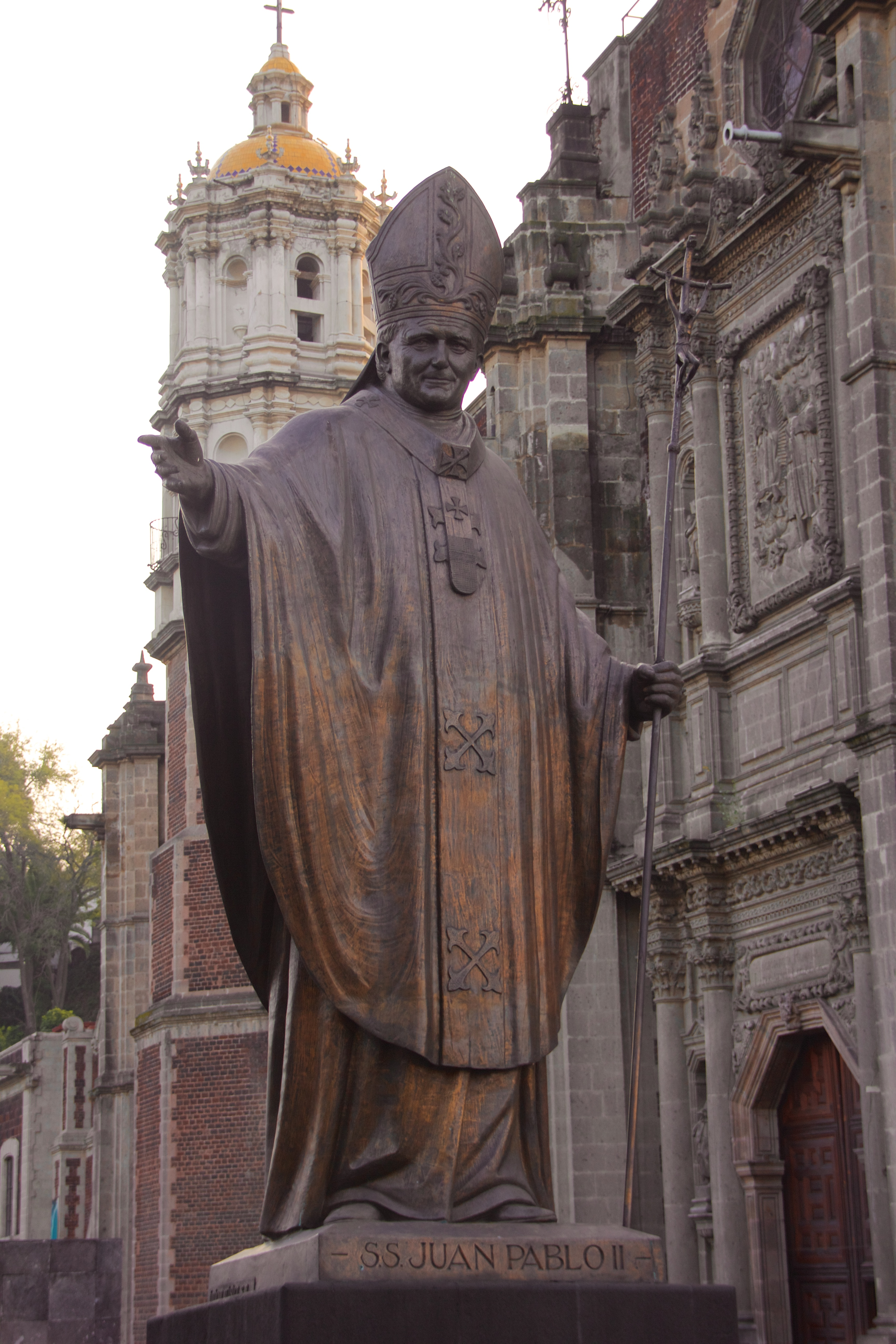
Outside Basilica of Our Lady of Guadalupe, Gustavo A. Madero

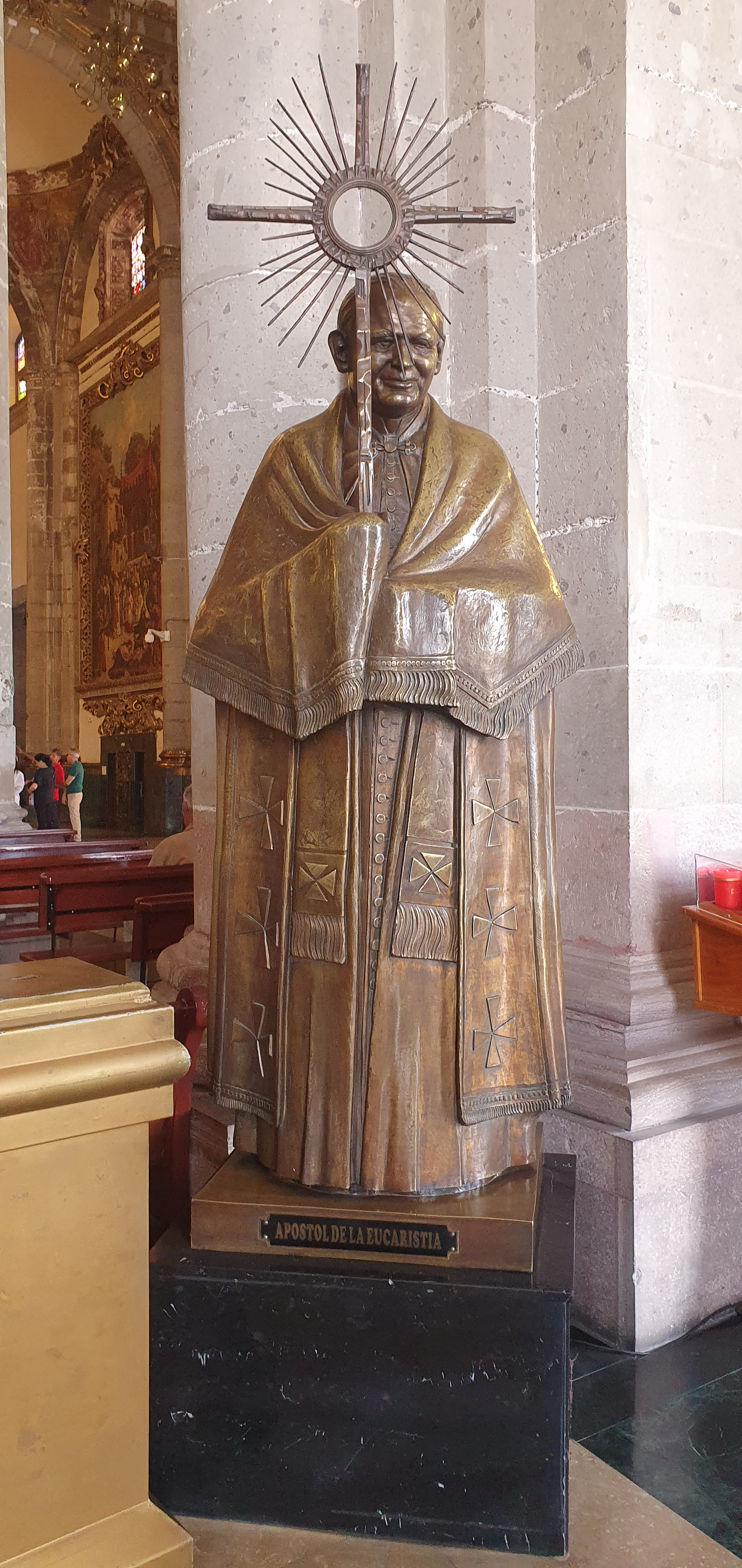
Inside Basilica of Our Lady of Guadalupe, Gustavo A. Madero

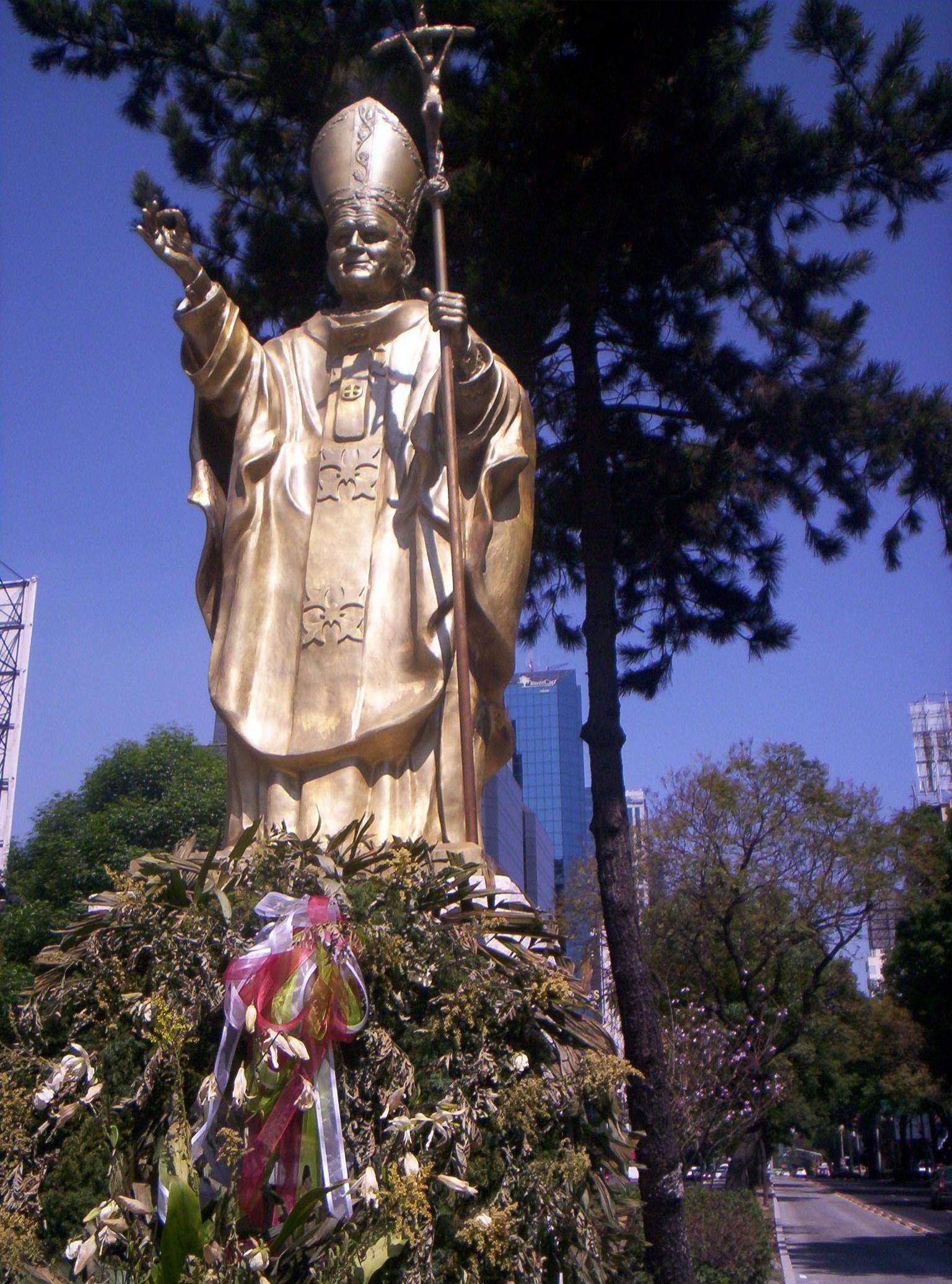
Avenida de los Insurgentes, Benito Juárez

== Poland ==
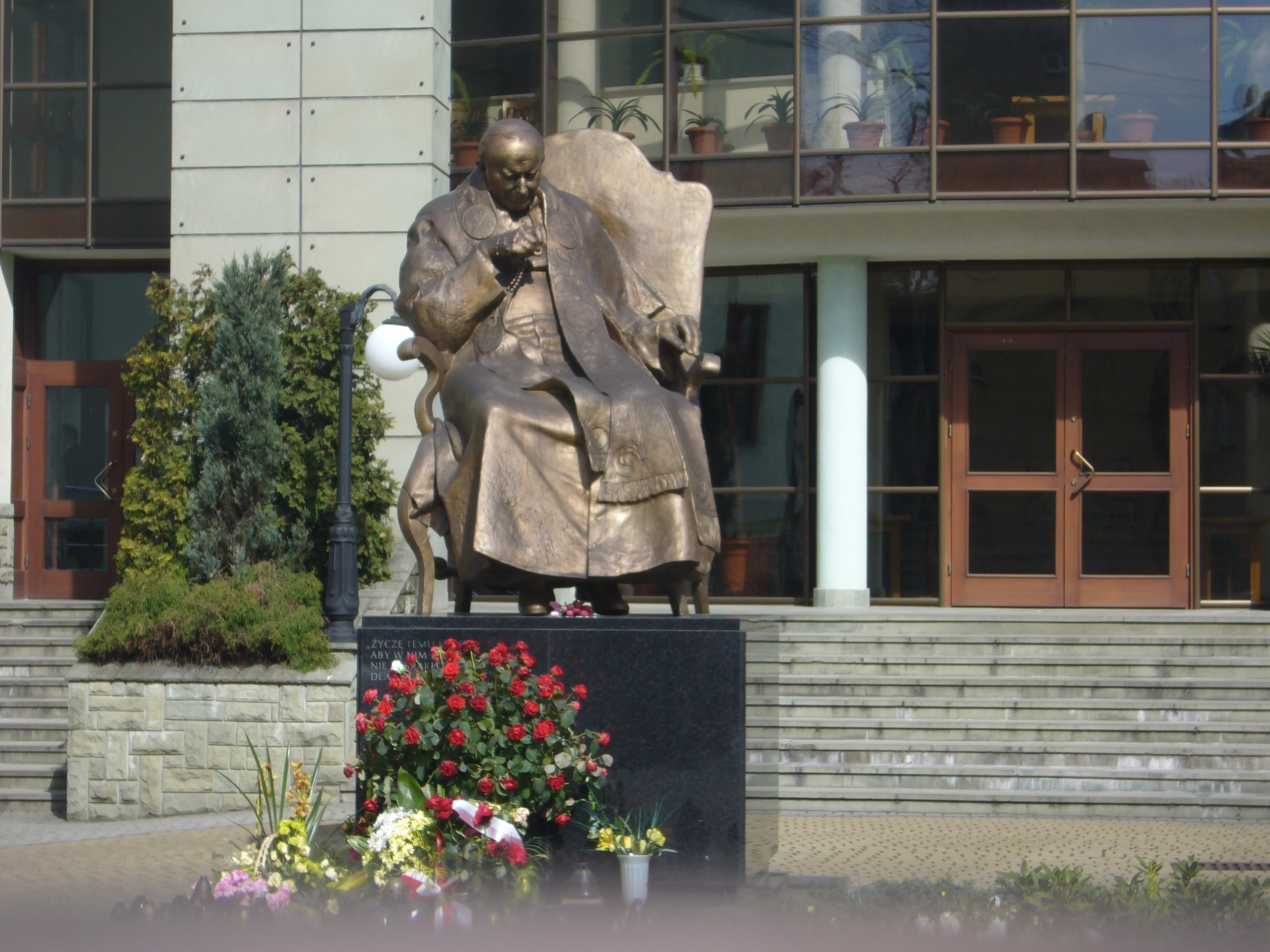
Bielsko-Biała: monument by Jan Kucz, 2006

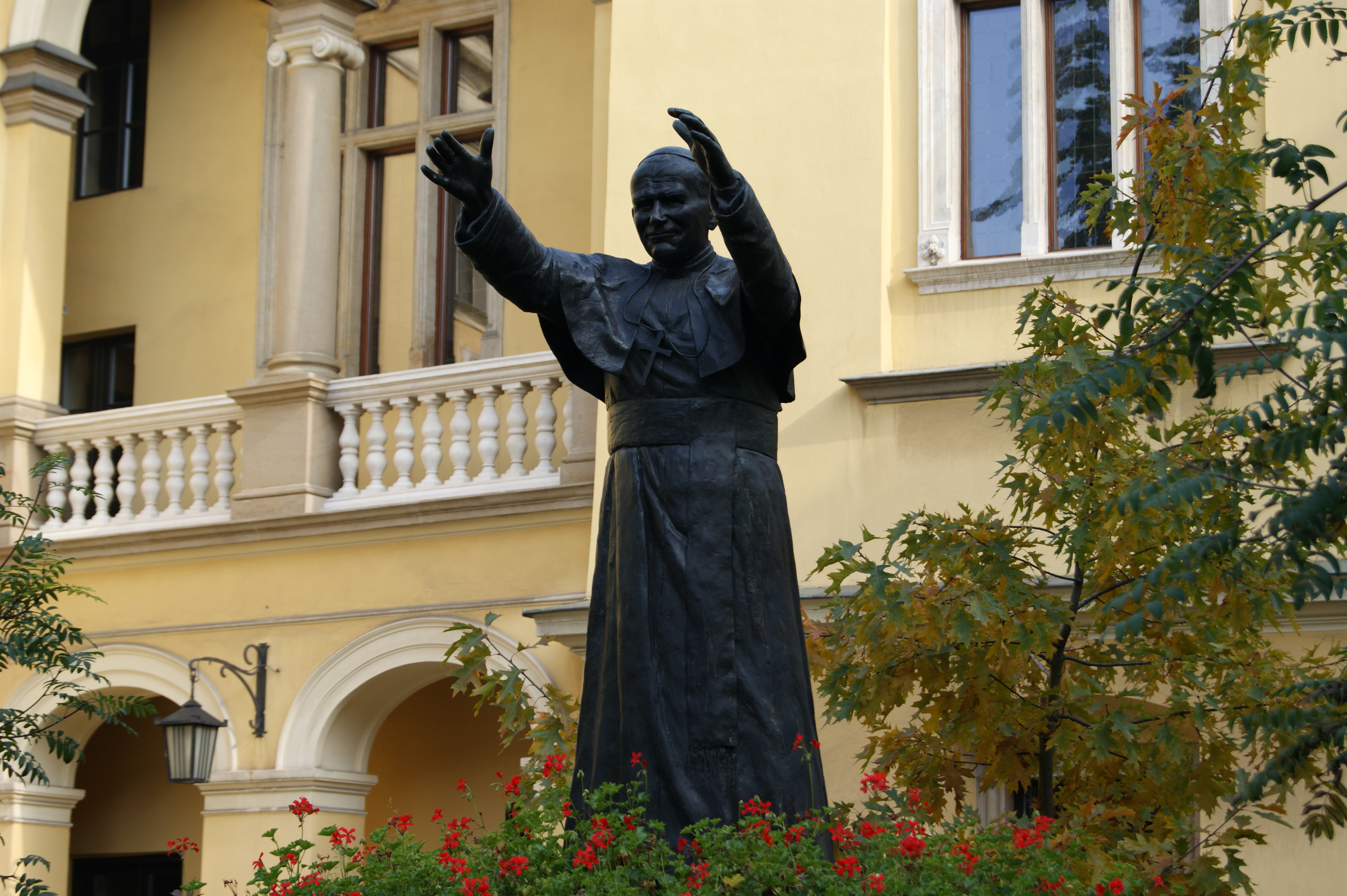
Kraków: Archbishop's Palace courtyard, 1980

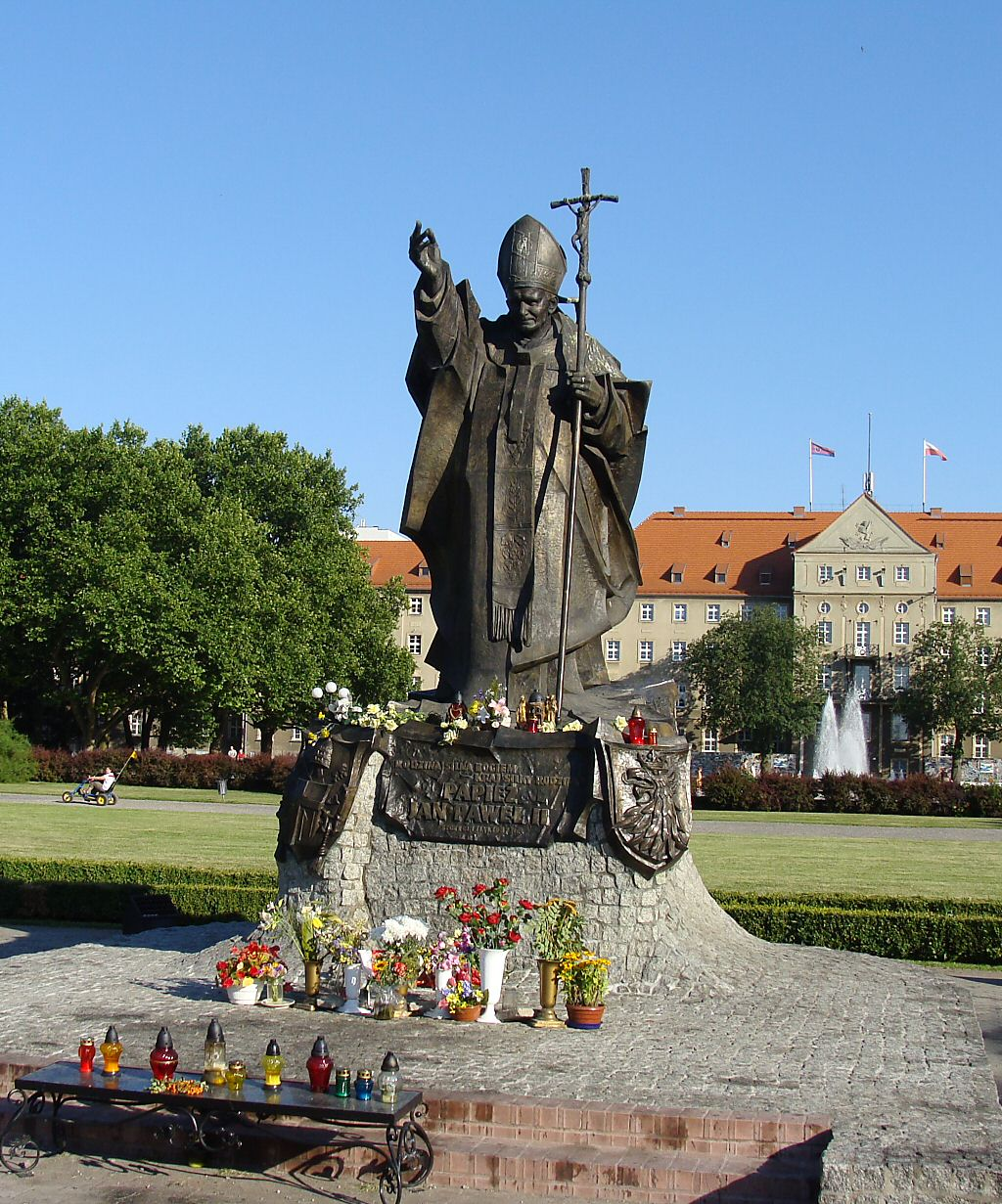
Szczecin: Statue of Pope John Paul II

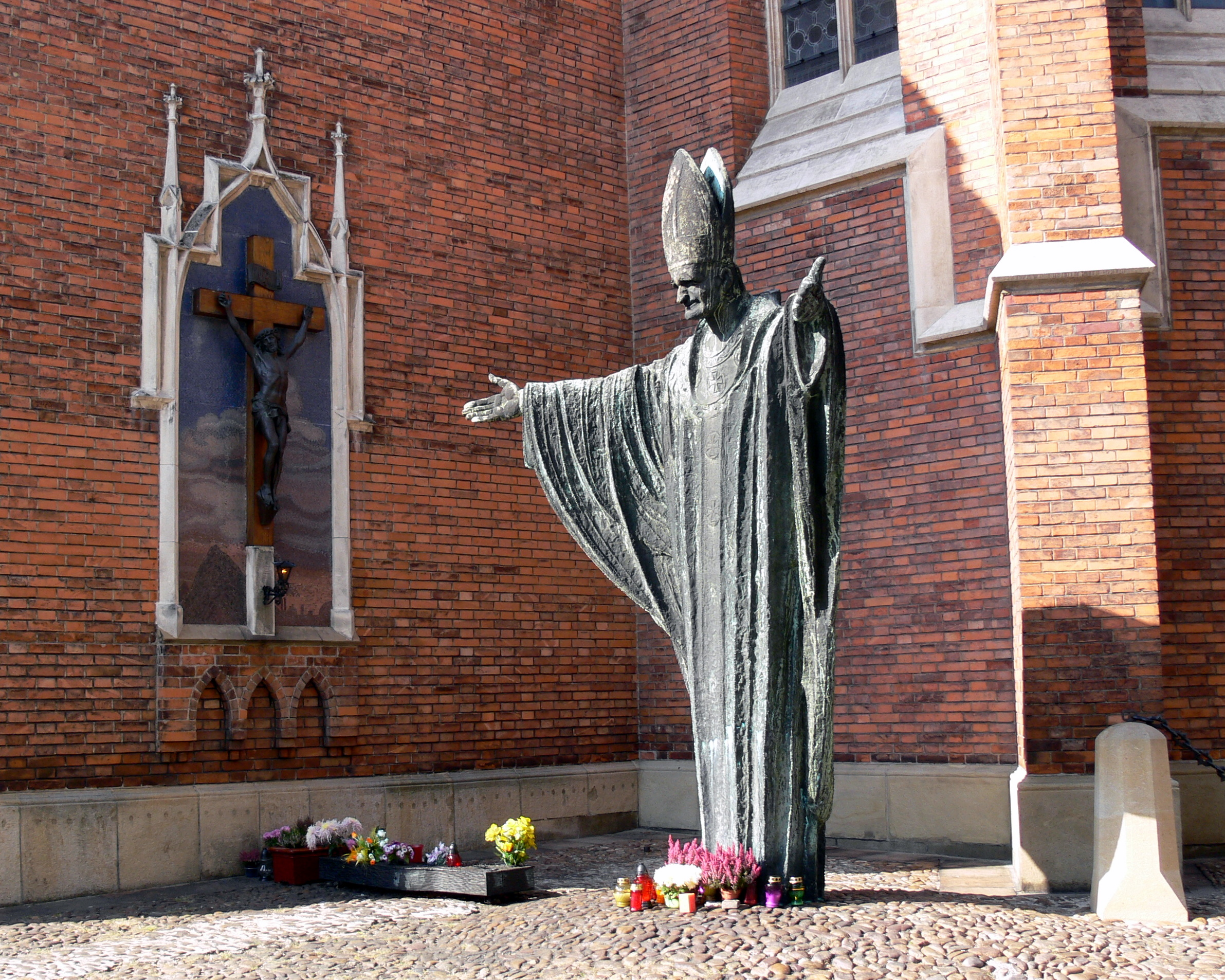
Tarnów: Tarnów Cathedral, monument by Bronisław Chromy, 1981

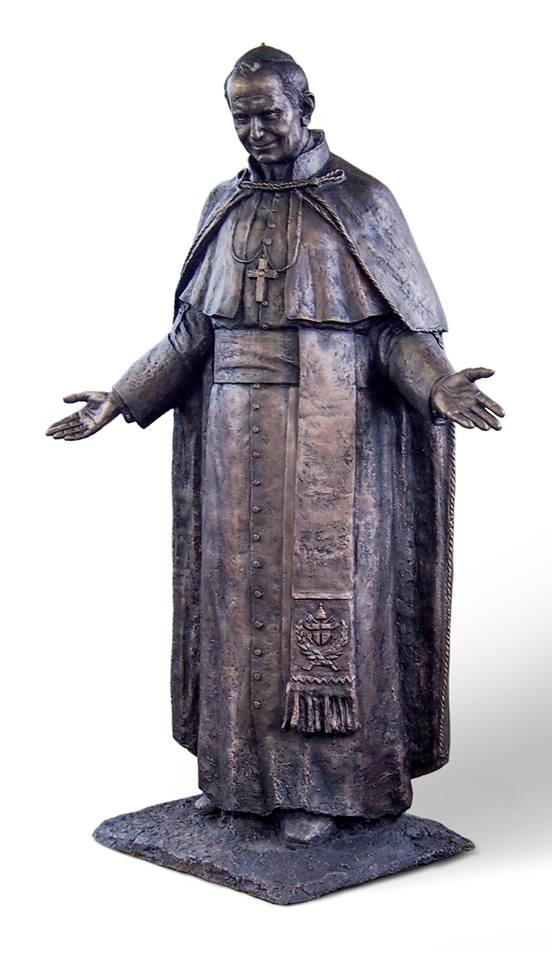
Toruń: Radio Maryja, monument, by Giennadij Jerszow 2014

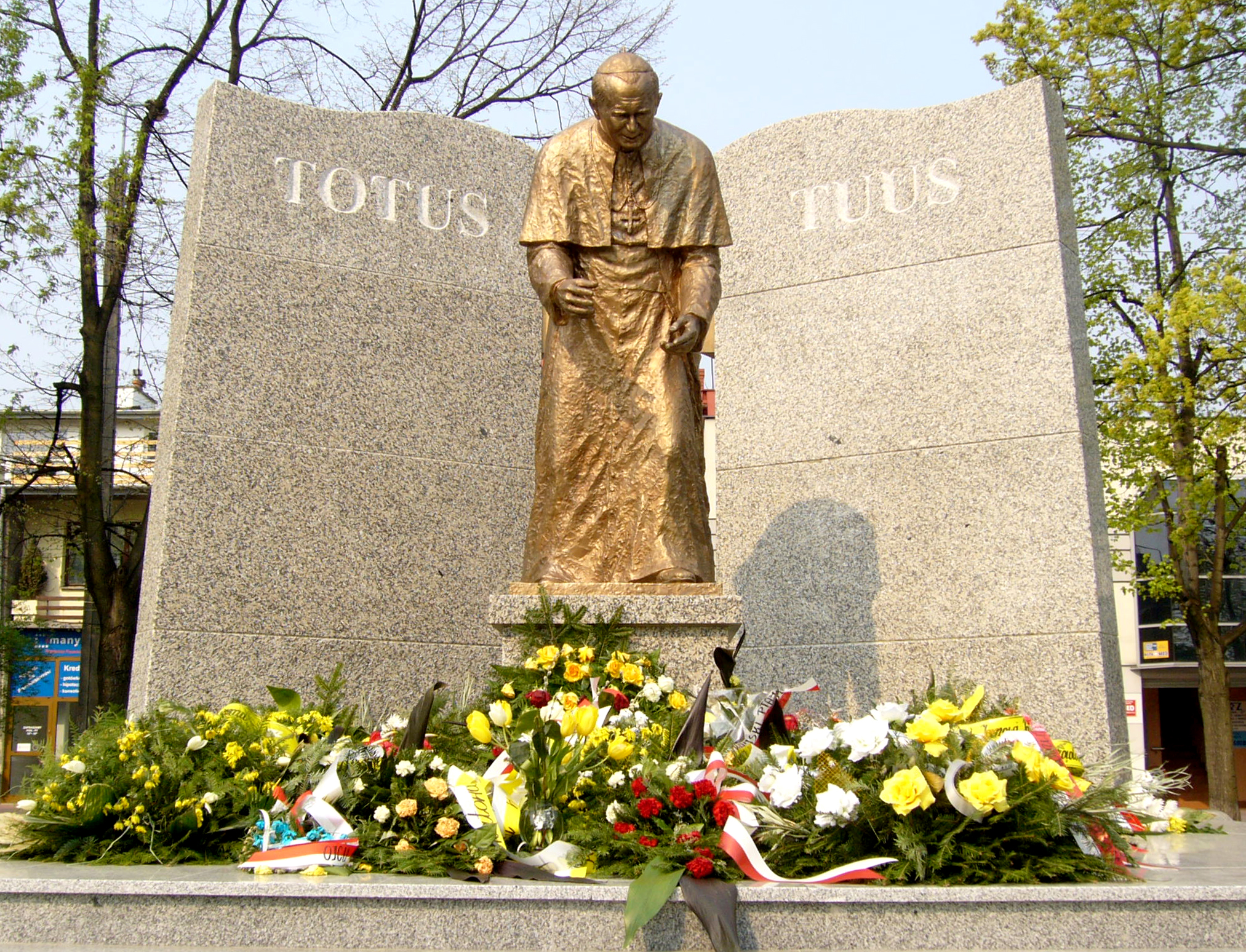
Wołomin, Pl. 3 Maja

== Portugal ==
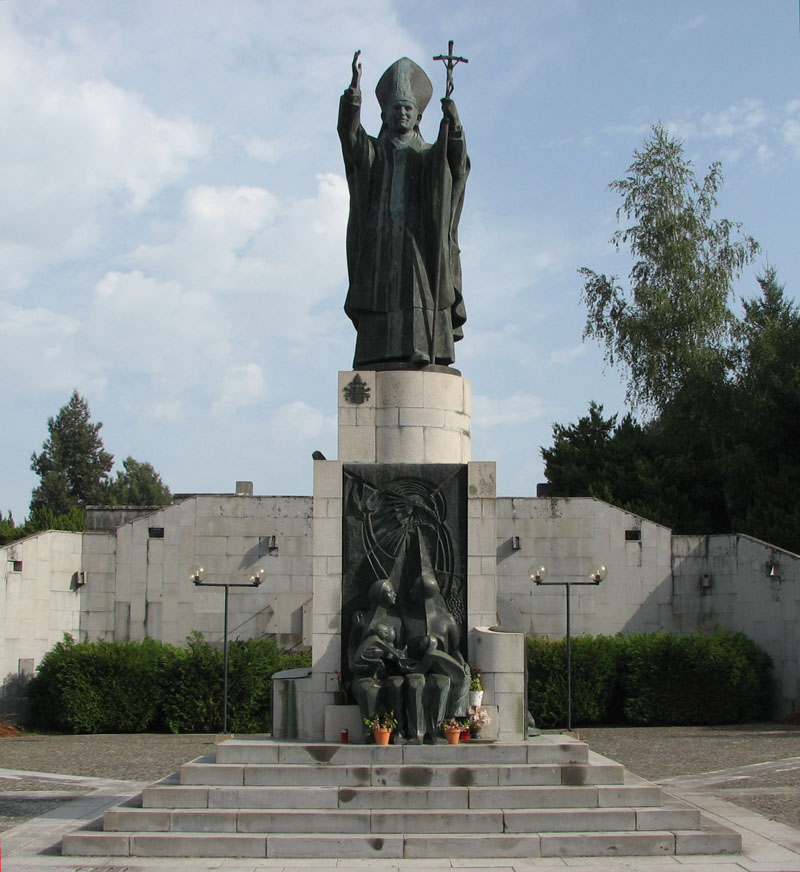
Braga: Sameiro Sanctuary

== Slovenia ==
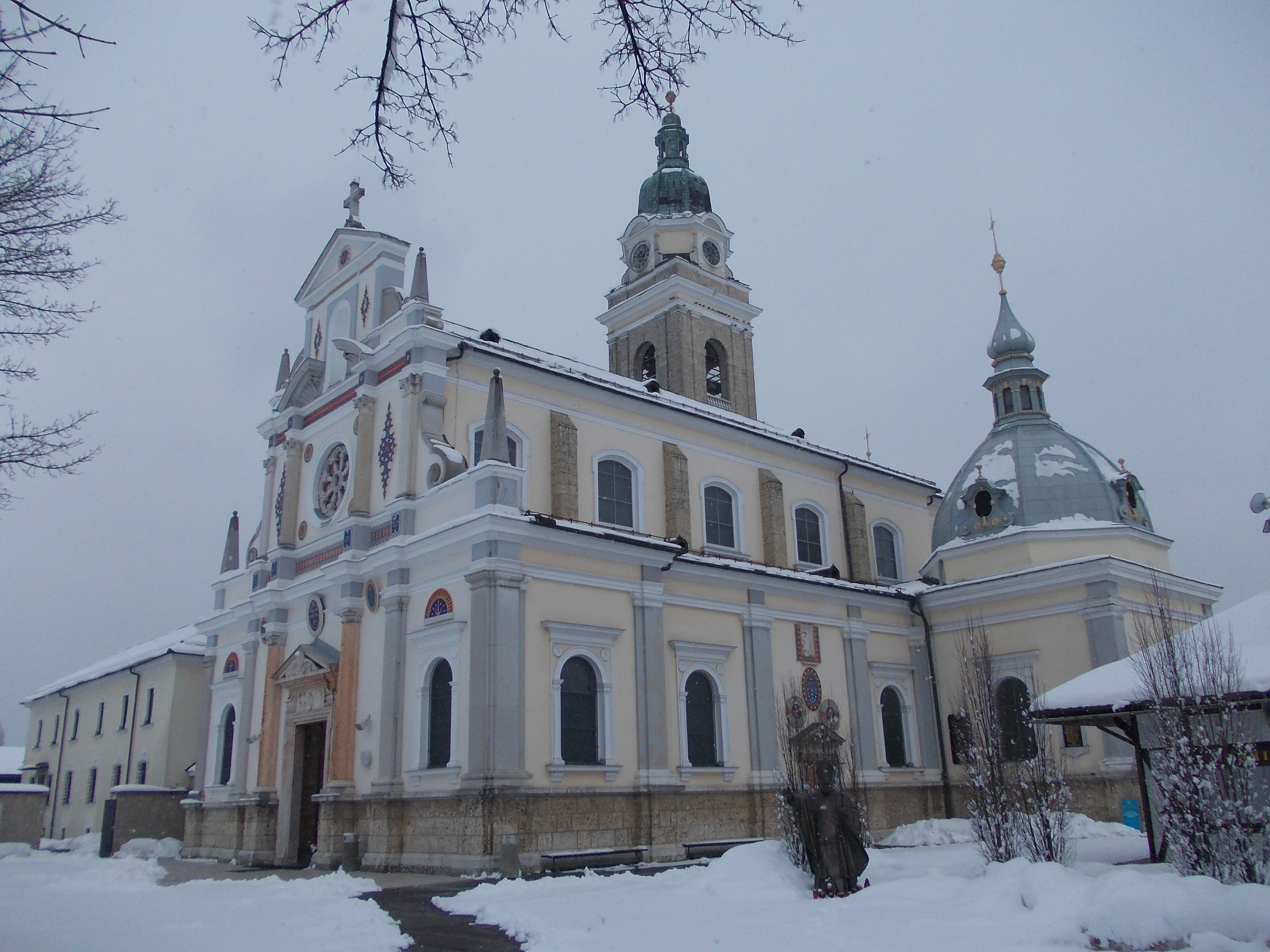
Statue in front of basilica in Brezje, Radovljica

== United States ==
- Boston (Pope John Paul II Memorial)

== See also ==
- Pope John Paul II topics
