= Francisco Cárdenas =

Francisco Cárdenas may refer to:

- Francisco Cárdenas (baseball) (fl. 1920s), Cuban baseball player
- Francisco de Cárdenas Espejo (1817–1898), Spanish journalist and politician, minister of justice in 1874–1875
- Francisco Cárdenas Martínez ("Pancho Cárdenas", born 1958), Mexican sculptor and artist
- Francisco Cárdenas Sucilla (1878–1920), Mexican member of the Guardia Rural, alleged killer of President Francisco I. Madero
- Francisco A. Cárdenas (1879 –1943), Mexican engineer and politician, governor of Nuevo León in 1931–1933
