= John Paul II Park (Santiago) =

Urban park in Las Condes, Chile

- Parque Juan Pablo II
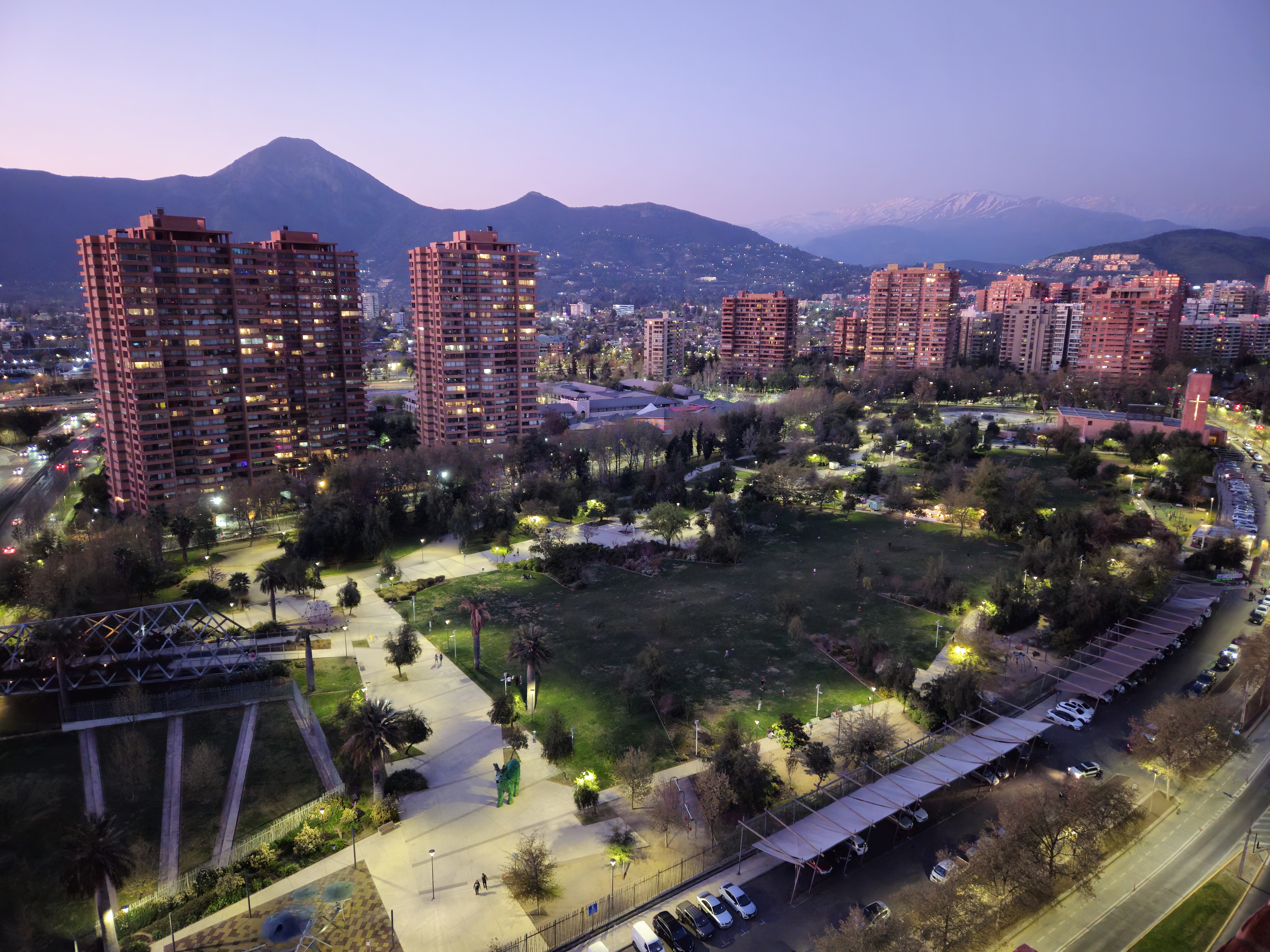
- Interactive map of John Paul II Park
- Type: Urban
- Location: Cerro Colorado 6130, Las Condes, Santiago, Chile
- Coordinates: 33°24′01″S 70°34′06″W
- Created: 6 June 2009

John Paul II Park (Spanish: Parque Juan Pablo II), previously known as the East Araucano Park (Spanish: Parque Araucano Oriente), is an urban park located in the affluent commune of Las Condes in Santiago, Chile, between Nuestra Señora del Rosario, Manquehue, Presidente Riesco, and Cerro Colorado streets. The park sits opposite Araucano Park through Manquehue Avenue and is connected to it by a footbridge.

A 7-metre-tall (23 ft) statue of Pope John Paul II, covered in plants, was erected in the park in his honour.

== History ==
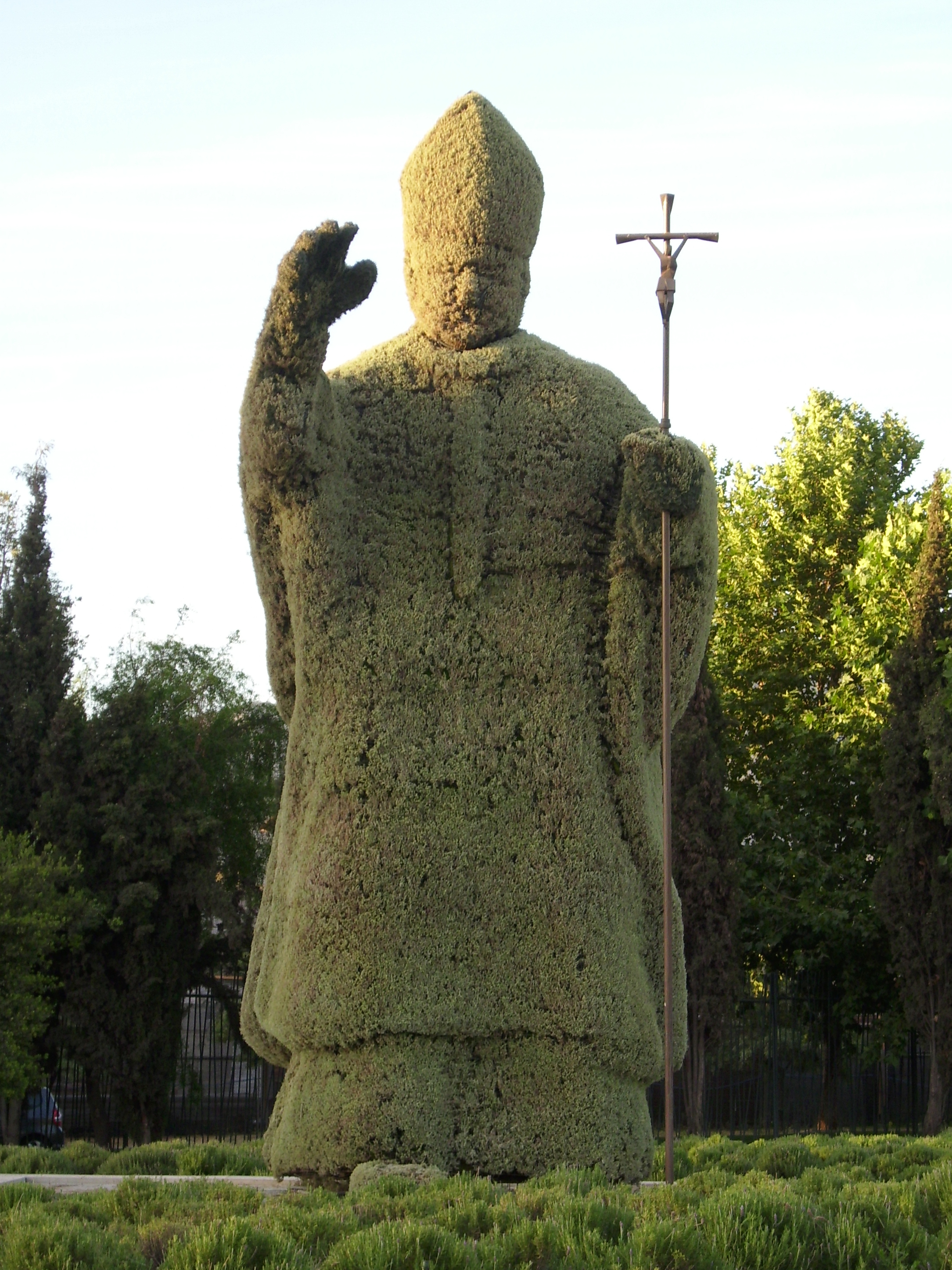
Statue of Pope John Paul II in the park

The park is located on the former site of the San Luis Fund, which was used to develop the Barrio Modelo San Luis. A design competition was held in 2005 to choose a design for the park, and the winning proposal was submitted by Polish-Chilean architect Cristina Felsenhardt, and Chilean architects Hans Muhr and Juana Zunino, with 70,000 square metres (750,000 sq ft) of land allocated for the park's construction.

The park was inaugurated on 6 June 2009, after being renamed to its current name. The opening ceremony was led by Francisco de la Maza, the Mayor of Las Condes, and Francisco Javier Errázuriz Ossa, the archbishop of Santiago. During the ceremony, Maza announced that a statue would be built to honour John Paul II and launched a design competition to select its design. The winning design, a 7-metre-tall (23 ft) statue on a concrete base, featured a "green" design, incorporating a plant-covered mesh that enveloped the entire structure.

In 2013, the Entre Parques Footbridge was inaugurated, connecting the park with the Araucano Park. The bridge's design was chosen through a design competition, which was won by architects Juan Francisco Garcés, Pablo Levine, and Juan Ignacio Muñoz.

== See also ==
- John Paul II Park (Warsaw) - Park in Poland
- Pope John Paul II Park Reservation - State Park in Massachusetts, United States
