= Pope John Paul II Park Reservation =

State park of Massachusetts, United States

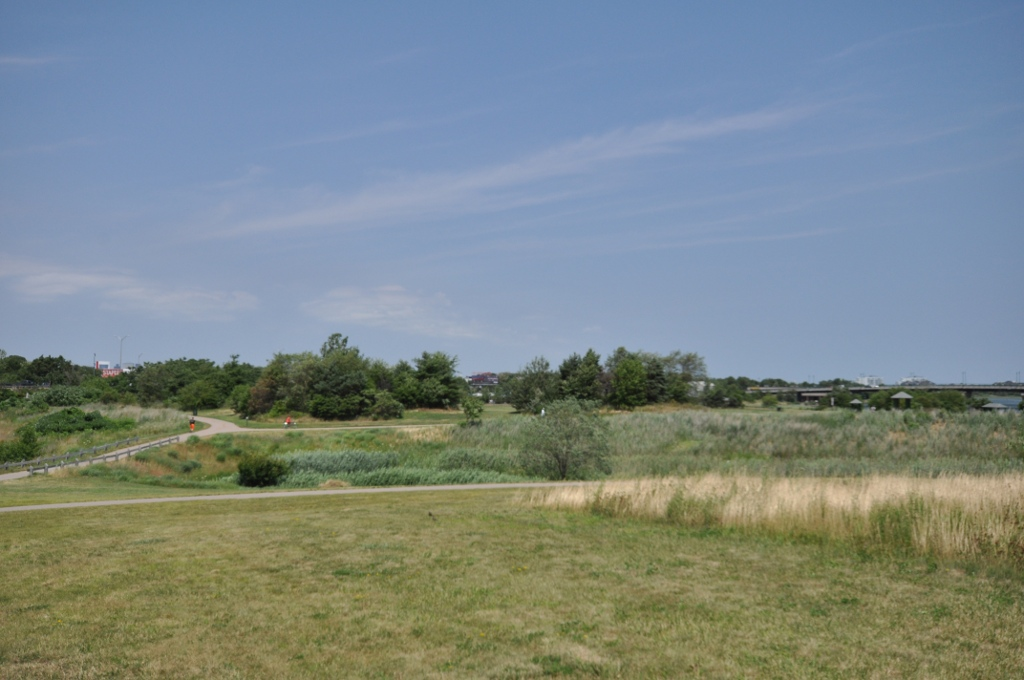

- Location within Greater Boston area Location within Massachusetts Location within the United States
- Location: Boston, Massachusetts, United States
- Coordinates: 42°16′47″N 71°2′42″W
- Area: 66 acres (27 ha)
- Established: 2001
- Named for: Pope John Paul II
- Administrator: Massachusetts Department of Conservation and Recreation
- Website: Official website

Pope John Paul II Park Reservation, officially the Saint Pope John Paul II Park, and also known as Pope Park, is a 66-acre (27 ha) Massachusetts state park bordering the Neponset River in the Dorchester section of Boston. The park was reclaimed from the former site of a landfill and the Neponset Drive-In as part of the Lower Neponset River Master Plan and the development of the Neponset River Reservation. It is managed by the Department of Conservation and Recreation, which has restored a salt marsh area and planted native trees and shrubs. The area now attracts an increased variety of birds to the habitat, including snowy egrets and great blue herons.

== History ==
The park received funding and work began in 1998, following several years of delays. It was constructed on the sites of a former drive-in theater (the Neponset Drive-in Theater) and an adjacent landfill (the Hallet Street dump) purchased in 1984 and 1973, respectively, by the Massachusetts Metropolitan District Commission (now the Department of Conservation and Recreation). It was named in honor of the visit by Pope John Paul II to Boston in 1979, in which the Pope celebrated his first Mass in the United States. The park was dedicated in 2000 by then Massachusetts Governor Paul Cellucci, and opened to the public in 2001. Following the canonization of Pope John Paul II, the park was officially redesignated as the "Saint Pope John Paul II Park", in a bill signed by Massachusetts Governor Charlie Baker in 2019.

== Activities and amenities ==
The park includes trails for walking, hiking and running, including the Lower Neponset River Trail. It also offers bird watching, fishing catch and release in some parts of the park, open space fields for soccer, picnicking, restrooms, and playgrounds, and it is home to many road races.

== See also ==
- John Paul II Park (Santiago)
- John Paul II Park (Warsaw)
