= Statue of Pope John Paul II (Mexico City Metropolitan Cathedral) =

Statue in Mexico City

- Llaves de fe (Spanish)
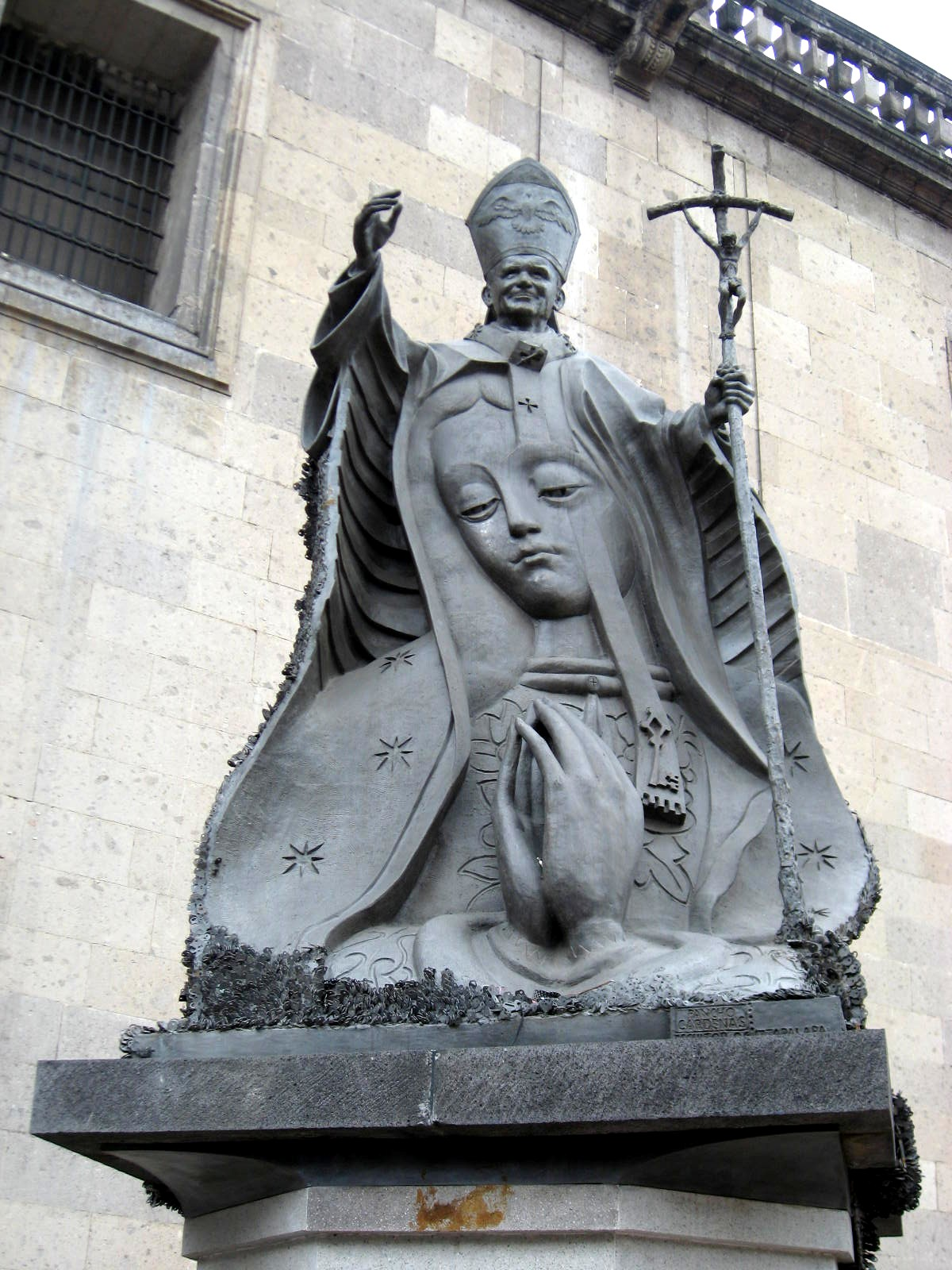
- The statue in 2008
- Location in Mexico City
- Artist: Francisco Cárdenas Martínez
- Year: 2007
- Subject: John Paul II and Our Lady of Guadalupe
- Dimensions: 3.1 m (10 ft)
- Weight: approx. 5 t (4.9 long tons; 5.5 short tons)
- Location: Mexico City, Mexico; 19°26′3.5″N 99°8′1.4″W

Llaves de fe (Spanish for 'Keys of Faith') is a monument to Pope John Paul II (Spanish: Monumento al Papa Juan Pablo II) installed outside the Mexico City Metropolitan Cathedral in the historic center of Mexico City, Mexico.

Sculpted by Francisco Cárdenas Martínez, it shows the Pope in vestments upon which the image of Our Lady of Guadalupe with hands clasped in prayer appears in high relief. The statue was cast with more than seven million keys donated by the population of Mexico, following an initiative by the conglomerate Grupo Salinas two years after John Paul II's death.

== Background ==
John Paul II was a popular pope in Mexico. He officiated a mass in 1979 at the Mexico City Metropolitan Cathedral, the only pope to do so, in which he uttered the phrase "México, siempre fiel" ('Mexico, always faithful'). He traveled to Mexico five times and two other statues of him have been installed in Mexico City.

In 2005, Grupo Salinas, owned by Ricardo Salinas Pliego, launched the initiative Dale la llave de tu corazón ('Give him the key to your heart'), requesting unused keys from the public for melting down so as to cast a monument to John Paul II. The conglomerate also invited sculptors to submit designs, with the final design selected by the public.

== Description and installation ==
The conglomerate received more than seven million keys, mostly bronze keys, at the headquarters of TV Azteca – owned by Grupo Salinas. Keys deemed unusable for the sculpture's exterior were used for the interior.

Llaves de fe is 3.1 meters (10 ft) tall and weighs approximately 5 metric tons (4.9 long tons; 5.5 short tons). Francisco Cárdenas Martínez sculpted it in the borough of Iztapalapa. He said the most difficult part was sculpting John Paul II's face. He was required to depict the Pope as he appeared in 1979. The sculpture portrays John Paul II wearing vestments with a high-relief image of Our Lady of Guadalupe, who has her hands clasped in prayer.

Llaves de fe was installed in 2007 on the cathedral's west side. During the event, alumni of La Academia performed live in a television show broadcast by TV Azteca.

== See also ==
- List of monuments and memorials to Pope John Paul II
