= Araucano Park =

Chilean Urban Park

- Parque Araucano
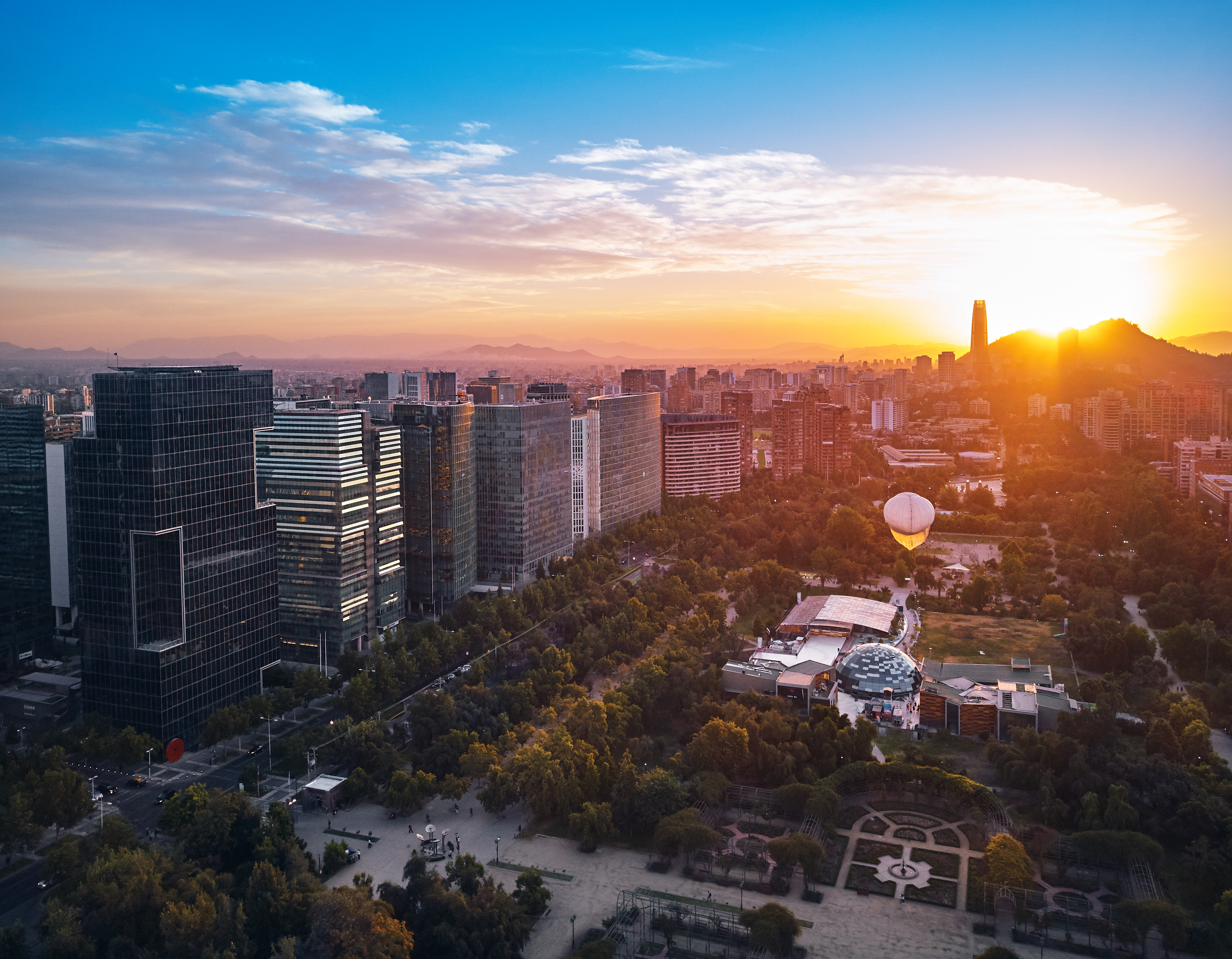
- Interactive map of Araucano Park
- Type: Urban Park
- Location: Las Condes
- Coordinates: 33°24′16″S 70°34′39″W
- Area: 22 ha (54 acres)
- Open: 6:30 to 21:30.
- Status: Open
- Parking: Underground and Ground Level Parking

Araucano Park (Spanish: Parque Araucano) is an urban park located in the Las Condes commune of Santiago, Chile, next to the Arauco Park Mall and connected to the Juan Pablo II park by a Foot Bridge.

The park includes multiple attractions, including a Children´s Park, Birdcage, Skate park, Rose garden and multiple sport areas. It also contains a Boulevard with multiple Restaurants and attractions.

== History ==
The park is located in land previously part of the San Luis farm, which was expropirated by the government of President Eduardo Frei Montlava which was sold to the Las Condes Municipality. It saw extensive work in the 1980s, until it was inaugurated in 1990. In 2013, a Foot Bridge was built over avenida Manquehue to connect the park to the Juan Pablo II Park.

The park is set to be the site of the Parque Araucano Metro Station in Line 7 of the Santiago Metro, which is due to open in 2027.
