= Pope John Paul II Memorial (Boston) =

Sculpture in Boston, Massachusetts, U.S.

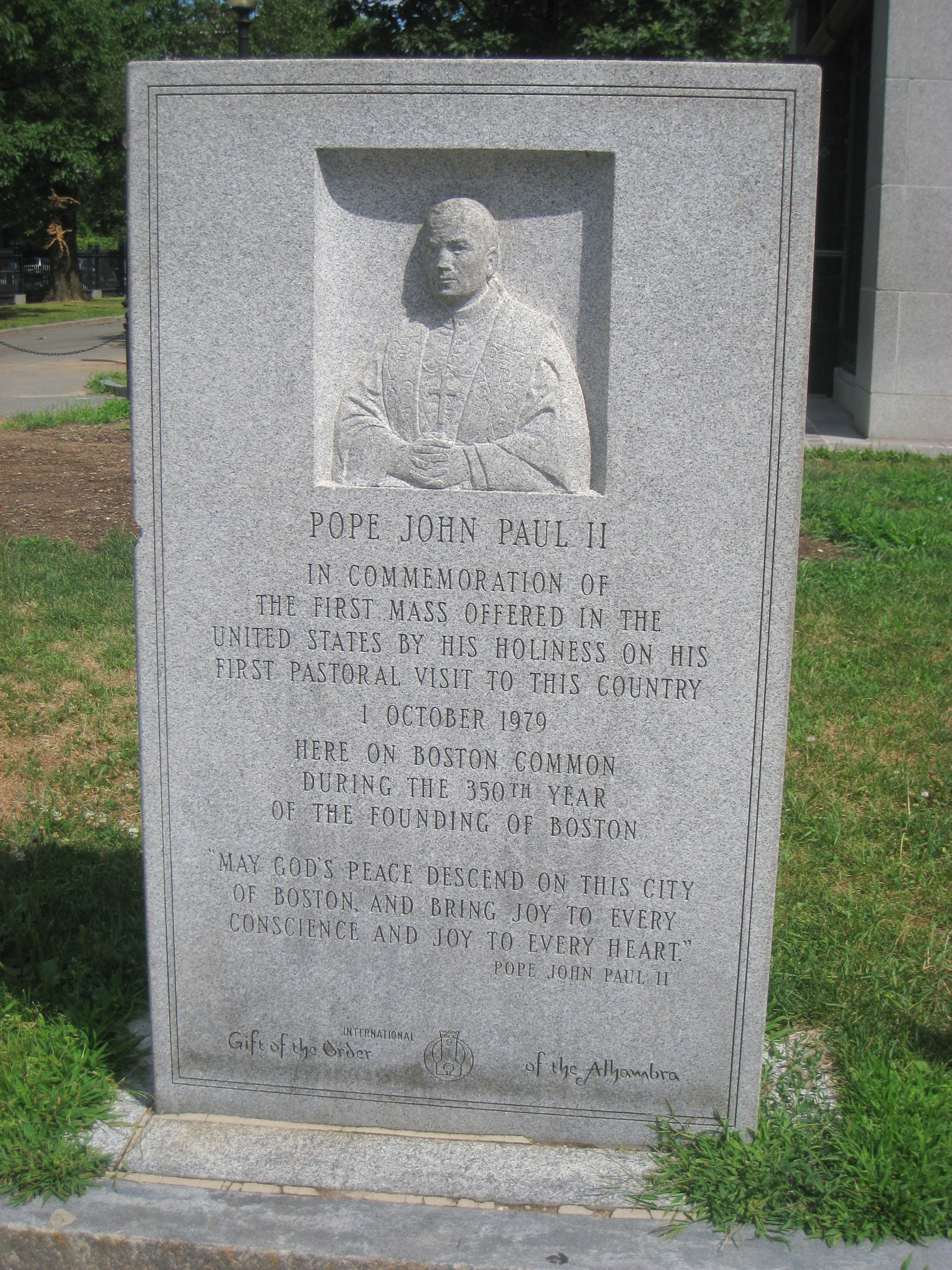
- The memorial in 2010
- Interactive map of Pope John Paul II Memorial
- Location: Boston
- Coordinates: 42°21′16.8″N 71°4′5.3″W
- Type: Memorial
- Length: 32 in
- Width: 8.25 in
- Height: 53.5 in
- Dedicated date: June 28, 1981
- Dedicated to: Pope John Paul II

A memorial placard of Pope John Paul II, sometimes called Papal Mass Plaque, is installed in Boston Common in Boston, Massachusetts, United States.

== Description and history ==
The memorial commemorates the first Mass he celebrated in the United States, on October 1, 1979, at Boston Common. The Gray granite tablet measures approximately 53.5 x 32 x 8.25 in., and was dedicated on June 28, 1981.

An inscription reads: "POPE JOHN PAUL II / IN COMMEMORATION OF / THE FIRST MASS OFFERED IN THE / UNITED STATES BY HIS HOLINESS ON HIS / FIRST PASTORAL VISIT TO THIS COUNTRY / 1 OCTOBER 1979 / HERE ON BOSTON COMMON / DURING THE 350TH YEAR / OF THE FOUNDING OF BOSTON / "MAY GOD'S PEACE DESCENT ON THIS CITY / OF BOSTON, AND BRING JOY TO EVERY / CONSCIENCE AND JOY TO EVERY HEART." / POPE JOHN PAUL II / GIFT OF THE INTERNATIONAL ORDER OF THE ALHAMBRA".

The work was surveyed by the Smithsonian Institution's "Save Outdoor Sculpture!" program in 1996.

== See also ==
- List of monuments and memorials to Pope John Paul II
