= List of mayors of Las Condes =

This is a list of mayors of the Chilean commune of Las Condes, part of Greater Santiago in the Santiago Metropolitan Region.

| Mayor | Party | Took office | Left office |
|---|---|---|---|
| Luis Barros Borgoño | — | 1901 | unknown |
| Pedro Fernández Concha | — | 1901 | unknown |
| Osvaldo Rengifo | — | 1901 | unknown |
| Roberto Guzmán Montt | — | 1919 | unknown |
| Ramón Castro | — | 1919 | unknown |
| Joaquín Cerda | — | 1919 | unknown |
| Aurelio González | — | 1919 | unknown |
| Adolfo Mujica | — | 1919 | unknown |
| Ricardo Cerda Cruz | — | 1932 | 1935 |
| Nibaldo Correa Barros | — | 1935 | 1941 |
| Aníbal Quiroz Peralta | — | 1941 | 1942 |
| Vital Guzmán Guzmán | — | 1942 | 1944 |
| Manuel Goycolea Espoz | — | 1944 | 1947 |
| Samuel Sánchez Vial | — | 1947 | 1948 |
| Adolfo Braun Guevara | — | 1948 | 1949 |
| Manuel Goycolea Espoz | — | 1949 | 1951 |
| Florencio Correa Ga | — | 1951 | 1952 |
| Samuel Sánchez Vial | — | 1952 | 1953 |
| Manuel Goycolea Espoz | — | 1953 | 1954 |
| Eduardo Hamilton Depassier | — | 1954 | 1956 |
| Álvaro Salamero Riera | — | 1956 | 1960 |
| Jorge Clark Donoso | — | 1960 | 1961 |
| Álvaro Salamero Riera | — | 1961 | 1965 |
| José Rabat Gorchs | — | 1965 | 1968 |
| Silvia Boza de Álvarez | — | 1968 | 1969 |
| Eduardo Cuevas Valdés | — | 1969 | 1970 |
| Ramón Luco Fuenzalida | — | 1970 | 1972 |
| José Rabat Gorchs | — | 1972 | 1973 |
| Carlos Guerrety Villalobos | — | 1973 | 1974 |
| Osvaldo Alliende Pereira | — | 1974 | 1977 |
| Sergio Guzmán Reyes | — | 1977 | 1979 |
| Alberto Labbé Troncoso | — | 1979 | 1980 |
| Jorge Martínez Rodríguez | — | 1980 | 1982 |
| Carlos Correa Sanfuentes | — | 1982 | 1985 |
| Juan Becker Quezada | — | 1985 | 1985 |
| Carlos Vara Vildósola | — | 1985 | 1986 |
| Margarita Moreno Zamora | — | 1986 | 1988 |
| Jorge Abud Cuevas | — | 1988 | 1989 |
| María de la Luz Herrera Crus | — | 1989 | 1990 |
| Sergio Trucco Palacios | — | 1990 | 1991 |
| Eduardo Jara Miranda | — | 1991 | 1992 |
| Joaquín Lavín Infante | UDI | 26 September 1992 | 11 June 1999 |
| Carlos Larraín Peña | RN | 11 June 1999 | 6 December 2000 |
| Francisco De La Maza | UDI | 6 December 2000 | 6 December 2016 |
| Joaquín Lavín | UDI | 6 December 2016 | 6 December 2021 |
| Daniela Peñaloza | RN | 6 December 2021 | 6 December 2024 |
| Catalina San Martín Cavada | IND | 6 December 2024 | Incumbent |
