= Francisco Cárdenas Martínez =

Mexican artist (born 1956)

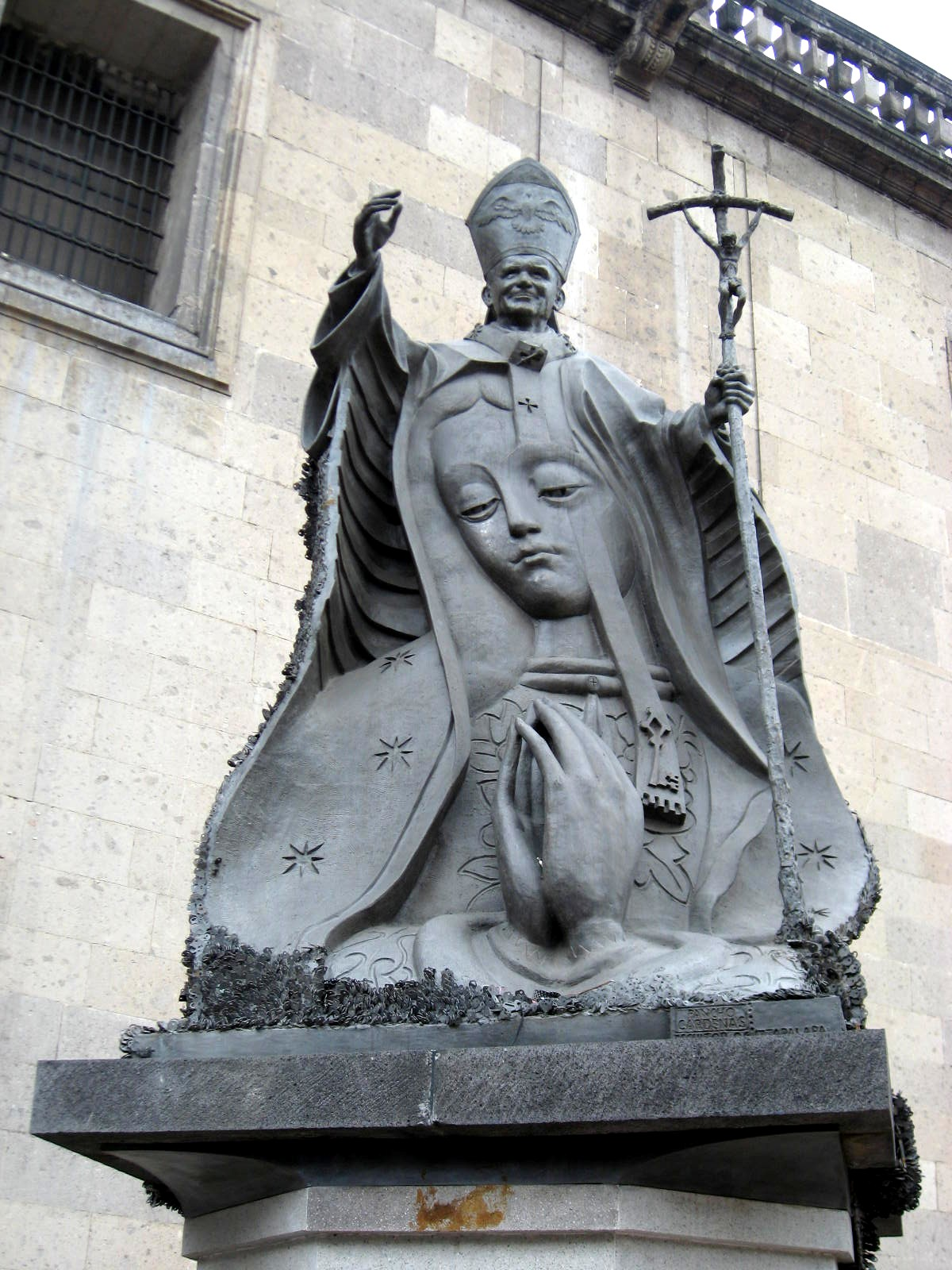
John Paul II statue by Cárdenas Martínez at the Mexico City Metropolitan Cathedral.

Francisco Cárdenas Martínez (born 1956), also known as Pancho Cárdenas, is a Mexican artist. He was born in Iztapalapa, east of Mexico City.

He is noted for his statue of Pope John Paul II with Our Lady of Guadalupe, made entirely with keys donated by Mexicans to symbolize that they had given him the keys to their hearts. His other works include the mural that surrounds the garden in Iztapalapa, depicting the history and the origin of the Mexican people.

== Biography ==
Francisco Cárdenas Martínez, also known as Pancho Cardenas, was born in 1956 in Iztapalapa, Mexico. He is a sculptor, painter, and muralist. He began his artistic path as a student when he participated in a student exhibition in the Galería Plastica nueva in San Cosme. A priest named Enrique Gonzales Torres, who was rector of the Universidad Iberoamericana, took interest in Francisco's work. Enrique Gonzales told Francisco to dedicate himself to painting and he will provide a check monthly to sustain him. Francisco was able to travel to France, lived in New York for about eight years, and when he had exhibitions, Enrique provided the car, expenses, and the audience.

== Pope John II with Our Lady Guadalupe ==
The statue is of Pope John II as he is wearing the face of Our Lady Guadalupe on his attire. It is made entirely out of keys, donated from the local people of Mexico, to signify that he has the keys to their hearts. The Statue is located at The Metropolitan Cathedral of the Assumption of the Most Blessed Virgin Mary into Heaven.

== Los Lobos de Loyola statues ==
In January 2002, he placed a bronze, 8x16ft statue in the Universidad Iberoamericana in Mexico city. The statue is of two wolves and a stewpot for the family coat of arms of St. Ignatius Loyola, founder of the Jesuit order. The family name "Lobos y Olla" translates to wolves and a stewpot, and combines turns into "Loyola." The pot suggests the symbol of hospitality as the family always provided their soldiers with a generous amount of food that the wolves of the area were able to feast from the remaining in the kettle as well. The statue is the first of the three that he had created. The second of the three is located in the University of San Francisco. It was commissioned by the school and was placed on Fulton Street, in front of Gleeson Library/Geshke Center, Inner Richmond, November 2011. The third was unveiled on March 21, 2012, on Wolf and Kettle Day on Lake Shore Campus of Loyola University Chicago. Today the statue is located on the Norville Athletics Center and Gentile Arena on the campus.

== Exhibitions ==
On February 5, 2010, he donated La Tercera Caida to The Museum of Fine Arts exhibition, Una Huella en el Tiempo in Toluca. The piece was a large clay relief that recreates the third fall of Jesus when carrying the cross as he headed to Mount Calvary for his crucifixion.

On September 27, 2013, he participated in an exhibition Mexican Art Visions, celebrating Mexican artists. His triptych painting, "Face to Face" 2013, is oil on canvas and measures 120 x 90 cm each.

In May 2014, he participated in an exhibition Piel de Arena, Azul Tan Tan (Skin of Sand, Blue Tan Tan) in the city of Toluca.

== Murals ==
In Museo de Fuego Nuevo, Mexico City, Francisco and Miguel León Portilla created a mural called "Iztapalapa Ayer, Hoy y Siempre", (Iztapalapa Yesterday, Today, and Forever.) They used an acrylic, masaroca, and wood technique in the 4-panel mural to show the "Fuego Nuevo," (New Fire) ceremony along with the massacre of the Templo Mayor.
