= Francisco Cárdenas (baseball) =

Cuban baseball player (born 1898)

- Catcher
- Born: 1898; Havana, Cuba
- Batted: Right Threw: Right

Negro league baseball debut
- 1924, for the Cuban Stars (East)

Last appearance
- 1927, for the Cuban Stars (East)

Teams
- Gilkerson's Union Giants (1923, 1929); Cuban Stars (East) (1924–1927)

Lucio Francisco Cárdenas (1898 – death unknown) was a Cuban catcher in the Negro leagues in the 1920s.

A native of Havana, Cuba, Cárdenas made his Negro leagues debut in 1924 with the Cuban Stars (East). He played four seasons with the Stars through 1927. He also played two seasons for Gilkerson's Union Giants.
