= Statue of Pope John Paul II, Rome =

Coordinates: 41.90200°N 12.49901°E

- Conversations: Homage to John Paul II
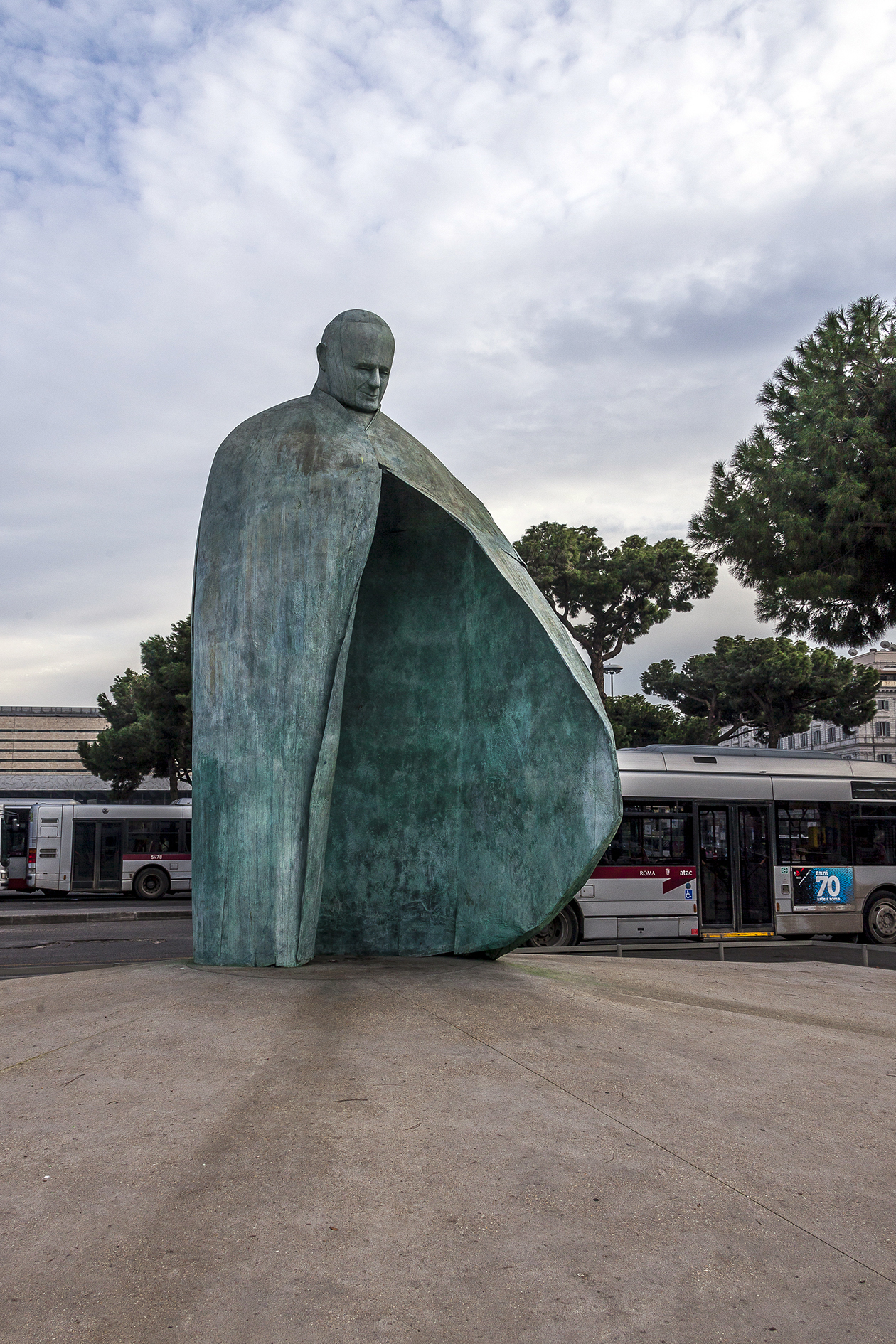
- Location: Rome, Italy
- Designer: Oliviero Rainaldi
- Type: Statue
- Material: Bronze
- Dedicated date: 18 May 2011
- Dedicated to: Pope John Paul II

The Monument to John Paul II is a memorial statue dedicated to the Pope John Paul II; it is located on an island (Piazza dei Cinquecento) alongside Viale Enrico di Nicola, in front of the Termini Train station in Rome, Italy.

The tall bronze monument was designed by Oliviero Rainaldi, and titled Conversations: Homage to John Paul II The statue was donated to the city by the Fondazione Silvana Paolini Angelucci Onlus, and inaugurated on 18 May 2011. The statue was criticized because the face was felt to only faintly resemble the pope, and the open vestment was compared to a tent or bell. Repairs were performed, and the new statue re-inaugurated in 2012.
