= Las Condes =

- Commune
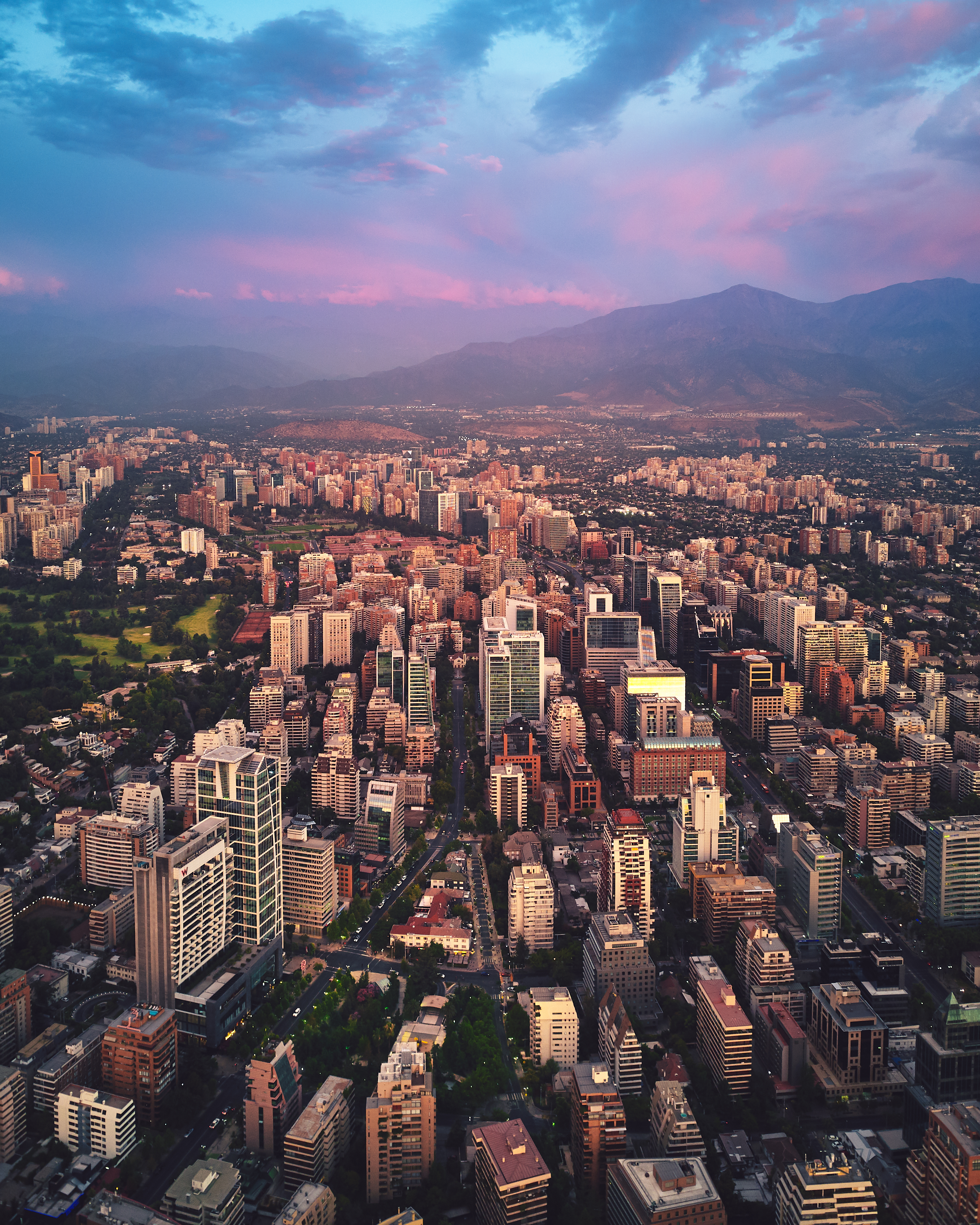
- Skyline view from Gran Torre Santiago

- Coat of arms Location of Las Condes within Greater Santiago Location in Chile
- Coordinates (city): 33°24.7′S 70°33′W
- Country: Chile
- Region: Santiago Metropolitan Region
- Province: Santiago Province
- Founded: 26 August 1901

Government
  - Type: Municipality
  - Mayor: Catalina San Martín (Ind.)

Area
  - Total: 99.4 km^{2} (38.4 sq mi)
- Elevation: 709 m (2,326 ft)

Population (2024)
  - Total: 296,134
  - Density: 2,980/km^{2} (7,720/sq mi)
- Demonym(s): Condino, -a
- Time zone: UTC-4 (CLT)
  - Summer (DST): UTC-3 (CLST)
- Area code: 56 +
- Website: www.lascondes.cl

Las Condes is an affluent commune in the northeastern zone of Santiago, in the Santiago Province in the Santiago Metropolitan Region in Chile, known as the country's main financial hub and one of Latin America's most prosperous urban districts. It has 296,134 inhabitants.

Las Condes comprises diverse neighborhoods, from the hyper-modern "Sanhattan" financial district to established residential areas like El Golf and Los Dominicos. The commune's rapid development has created a mix of luxury high-rises, single-family homes, and commercial centers.

It is home to corporate headquarters, luxury hotels, and high-rise offices that form a skyline locally known as "Sanhattan"—a name derived from the combination of Santiago and Manhattan. Beyond its business district, Las Condes contains residential neighborhoods, schools, and a mix of international institutions and communities.

== Etymology ==
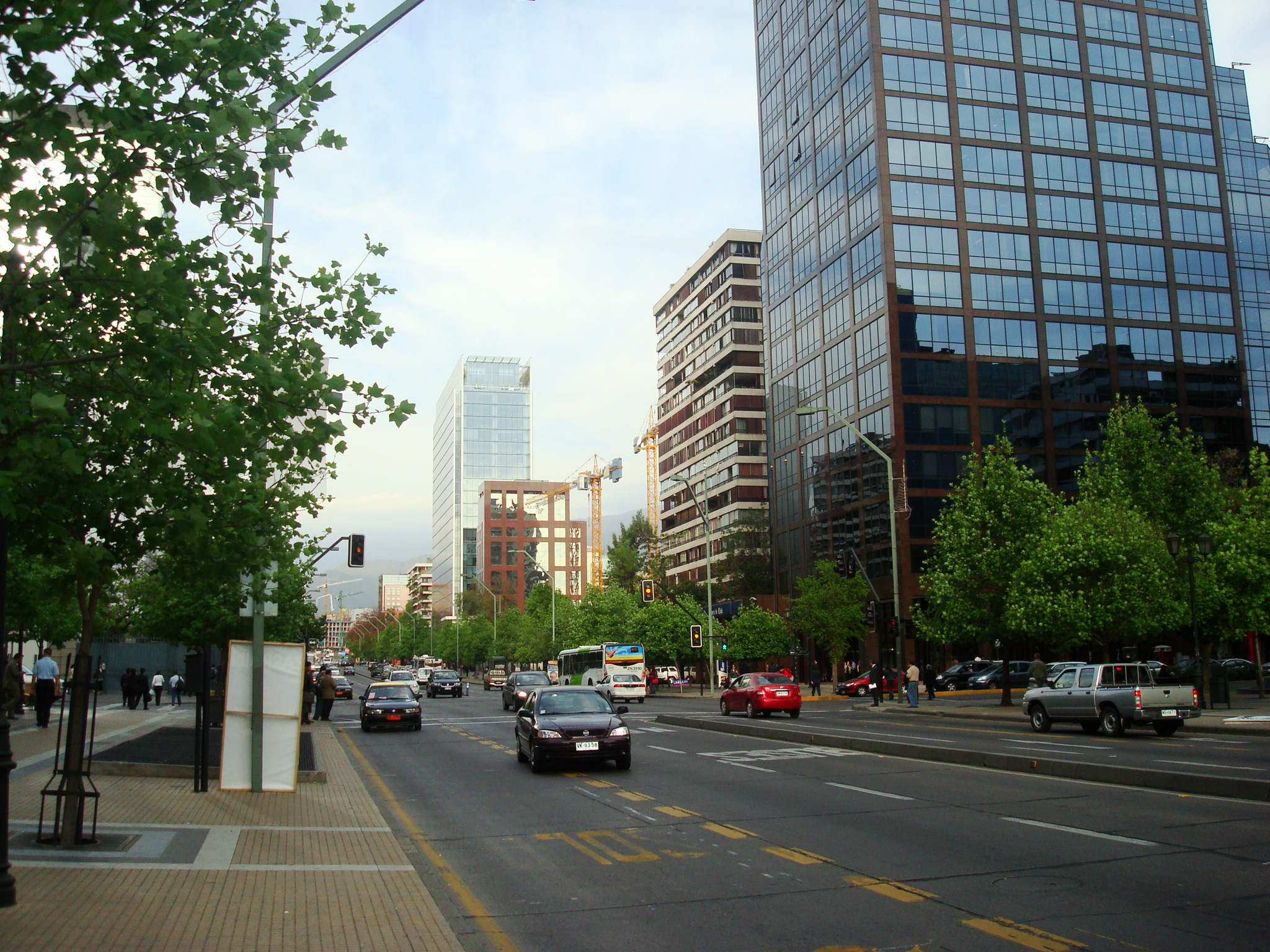
Avenida Apoquindo, the commercial heart of Las Condes

The name "Las Condes" has two competing origins. The more widely accepted theory traces it to colonial-era haciendas owned by the Counts of Sierra Bella, whose lands were colloquially called "Las Condes" rather than the grammatically correct "Los Condes." Another theory suggests Quechua roots from "Cunti," referring to the western part of the Inca Empire's Antisuyu region.

== History ==
=== Early settlement ===
The area's history dates to pre-Columbian times, with evidence of indigenous settlements from the Llolleo and Aconcagua cultures. The Inca Empire incorporated the region around 1470, establishing administrative control until Spanish conquest in the 1540s.

=== Colonial era to independence ===
During Spanish rule, the area comprised large agricultural estates. The Santa Rosa de Apoquindo manor, built in 1795, later became President Manuel Blanco Encalada's residence and now serves as a cultural center. The 19th century saw the area remain largely rural, with wealthy Santiago families maintaining country estates.

=== Modern development ===
Las Condes was officially established as a commune in 1901. Its transformation began mid-century as Santiago's expansion reached the foothills of the Andes. The 1970s-1990s witnessed rapid urbanization, with the emergence of high-rise office towers and upscale residential neighborhoods. In 1991, the commune was subdivided, creating the separate communes of Vitacura and Lo Barnechea.

== Geography ==
Located in Santiago's northeastern sector at the foothills of the Andes, Las Condes ranges from 709 to 975 meters above sea level. The terrain transitions from the flat Santiago basin to the rising slopes of the precordillera, featuring hills like Cerro Calán and Cerro Apoquindo.

The commune experiences a Mediterranean climate with winter rainfall, though higher elevations show alpine characteristics. The Mapocho River flows through the area, supplemented by the Canal San Carlos irrigation channel.

== Government ==
As a commune, Las Condes is a third-level administrative division of Chile and, as such, is governed by a mayor and councilors who are directly elected every four years. For the 2024–2028 term, the mayor is Catalina San Martín Cavada (Ind.), and the councilors are as follows:

- Leonardo Prat Fernández (REP)
- Guillermo Plaza Plaza (REP)
- Luis Hadad Acevedo (RN)
- Guillermo Ureta Larraín (UDI)
- Manuel Melero Abaroa (Ind./UDI)
- Richard Kouyoumdjian Inglis (Ind./RN)
- Pamela Hödar Alba (REP)
- Paulina Dittborn (REP)
- Francesca Gorrini Tesser (RN)
- Nayati Mahmoud Contreras (FA)

== Demographics ==
Historical population
Year	Pop.	±% p.a.
1970	112,590	—
1982	175,735	+3.78%
1992	208,063	+1.70%
2002	249,893	+1.85%
2017	294,838	+1.11%
2024	296,134	+0.06%
Source: INE, Memoria Chilena

As of the 2024 census, the population is 296,134, of which 46.6% are males, and 53.4% are females. People under 15 years old make up 14.1% of the population, and people over 65 years old make up 18.1%. 100% of the population is urban.

Las Condes is one of Santiago's most densely populated communes. It boasts Chile's highest socioeconomic indicators, with an average household income of US$67,672 (PPP) and poverty rates below 1%.

The commune hosts a significant Jewish community, with synagogues, schools, and the Estadio Israelita sports club. It also contains substantial populations of other immigrant groups, reflected in its international schools and cultural institutions.

=== Ethnic minorities ===
As of the 2024 census, Indigenous peoples make up 1.8% of the population, and Afro-Chileans make up 0.4%.

=== Religion ===
As of the 2024 census, 69.2% of the population over 15 years old are Christians (62.8% Catholics, 3.8% Evangelicals or Protestants, and 2.6% other branches), 1.4% are Jews, 0.1% are Muslims, 0.3% are Buddhists, 0.1% are Hinduists, 0.6% are adrehents of other religions, and 28.3% are irreligious.

=== Immigration ===
As of the 2024 census, immigrants make up 10.5% of the population - 7.1% are from South America, 1.1% from North America, 1.4% from Europe, 0.7% from Asia, 0.1% from Africa, and 0.1% from Oceania.

== Economy ==
In August 2026, Las Condes recorded $5.18 billion in exports and $2.43 billion in imports, resulting in a trade surplus of $2.75 billion. Year-over-year, monthly exports grew by 69.8% ($2.13 billion), while imports increased by 6.79% ($155 million). The commune ranked first nationally in both export and import volume among Chilean municipalities.

Las Condes serves as Chile's primary business district, hosting headquarters of major corporations including:

- LATAM Airlines Group and LAN Airlines
- Google Chile
- Microsoft Chile
- Intel Chile
- Movistar Chile

The "Sanhattan" area along Apoquindo Avenue contains numerous corporate towers, luxury hotels (Ritz-Carlton, Hyatt, Marriott, W Hotels), and the World Trade Center Santiago.

=== Real estate ===
The commune has experienced continuous real estate growth since the 1990s, with land values among Chile's highest. Recent metro expansions have spurred additional high-rise development, though creating traffic challenges that have prompted infrastructure improvements.

== International relations ==
=== International organizations ===
The commune of Las Condes is home to international organizations such as the Chilean office of the World Bank, and the Chilean office of the United Nations Children's Fund (UNICEF Chile).

=== International trade and investment ===
In the field of international trade and investment, the principal actors located in Las Condes include the Chilean-German Chamber of Commerce and Industry (AHK Chile), the Chilean-Australian Chamber of Commerce (AUSCHAM), the Chilean-Brazilian Chamber of Commerce, the Chilean-Canadian Chamber of Commerce (CANCHAM), the Chilean-Colombian Chamber of Commerce, the Chilean-Croatian Chamber of Commerce and Tourism (CROCHAM), the Chilean-American Chamber of Commerce (AmCham), the Hellenic-Chilean Chamber of Commerce and Culture, the Italian Chamber of Commerce in Chile, the Chilean-Japanese Chamber of Commerce and Industry, the Chile-Norway Chamber of Commerce, the Chilean-New Zealand Chamber of Commerce, the Chilean-Peruvian Chamber of Commerce, the Chile-Portugal Chamber of Commerce, the Chilean-British Chamber of Commerce (BRITCHAM), the Chilean-Swiss Chamber of Commerce, and the Chilean-Ukrainian Chamber of Commerce and Tourism (CTCU).

In addition, Las Condes hosts international trade and investment promotion agencies such as Germany Trade and Invest (GTAI), the Australian Trade Commission (AUSTRADE), Trade and Investment Queensland, Invest Victoria, Advantage Austria, the Trade Commissioner Service of Canada, the Walloon Agency for Export and Foreign Investment (AWEX), Export Development Canada (EDC), ProColombia, the Korea Trade-Investment Promotion Agency (KOTRA), the Trade Council of Denmark in Santiago, Basque Trade and Investment, the United States Commercial Service, Business Finland, Business France, the Israeli Trade Mission in Chile, the Japan External Trade Organization (JETRO), the Malaysian External Trade Development Corporation (MATRADE), New Zealand Trade and Enterprise (NZTE), PromPerú, Portugal Global (AICEP), the UK Department for Business and Trade Chile (DBT), CzechTrade, the Swiss Business Hub Chile, and the Thai Trade Center.

=== Internationalization in higher education ===
In the field of international relations and higher education, the principal actors located in Las Condes include the Vice-Rectorate for International Affairs of Andrés Bello National University, the Globalization Directorate (Global UDD) and the Center for International Relations Studies (CERI) of the Universidad del Desarrollo, the International Relations Directorate of the University of the Andes, and the International Experience Program of Santo Tomás University, Santo Tomás Professional Institute, and Santo Tomás Technical Training Center.

=== International cooperation and cultural diplomacy ===
In the field of international cooperation, the principal actor located in Las Condes is the Japan International Cooperation Agency (JICA). Regarding binational cultural and educational institutions, the Società Dante Alighieri stands out.

=== Embassies ===
- Saudi Arabia
- Algeria
- Australia
- Brazil
- Canada
- Colombia
- South Korea
- Costa Rica
- Denmark
- United Arab Emirates
- United States
- Philippines
- Finland
- Greece
- Guatemala
- Honduras
- India
- Iran
- Ireland
- Israel
- Lebanon
- Malaysia
- European Union (Delegation)
- Morocco
- Mexico
- Nicaragua
- Norway
- Libya
- New Zealand
- Netherlands
- Palestine
- Panama
- Paraguay
- Portugal
- United Kingdom
- Czech Republic
- Romania
- Syria
- South Africa
- Sweden
- Switzerland
- Thailand
- Taiwan (Economic and Cultural Office)
- Ukraine

== Education and culture ==
The commune contains several universities, including Universidad de los Andes, Universidad del Desarrollo, and branches of Universidad Andrés Bello and Universidad Mayor. International schools serve various foreign communities, including German, Italian, French, British, and American curricula.

Cultural institutions include the Las Condes Cultural Center, housed in a historic manor, and the Observatorio Astronómico Nacional on Cerro Calán.

== Transport ==
Las Condes is served by multiple Santiago Metro lines:

- Line 1: Tobalaba, El Golf, Alcántara, Escuela Militar, Manquehue, Hernando de Magallanes, Los Dominicos
- Line 4: Francisco Bilbao, Cristóbal Colón
- Future Lines 6 and 7 (under construction)

Major avenues include Apoquindo, Vitacura, Presidente Kennedy, and the Costanera Norte highway, providing connectivity throughout Santiago.

== Sports and recreation ==
The Claro Arena (formerly Estadio San Carlos de Apoquindo) serves as home to Club Deportivo Universidad Católica and hosts concerts and events. The commune contains numerous private sports clubs, parks (including Parque Araucano and Parque Los Dominicos), and the Pueblito de Los Dominicos crafts market.

== Sister cities ==
- Miraflores, Peru
- Petah Tikva, Israel

== Gallery ==
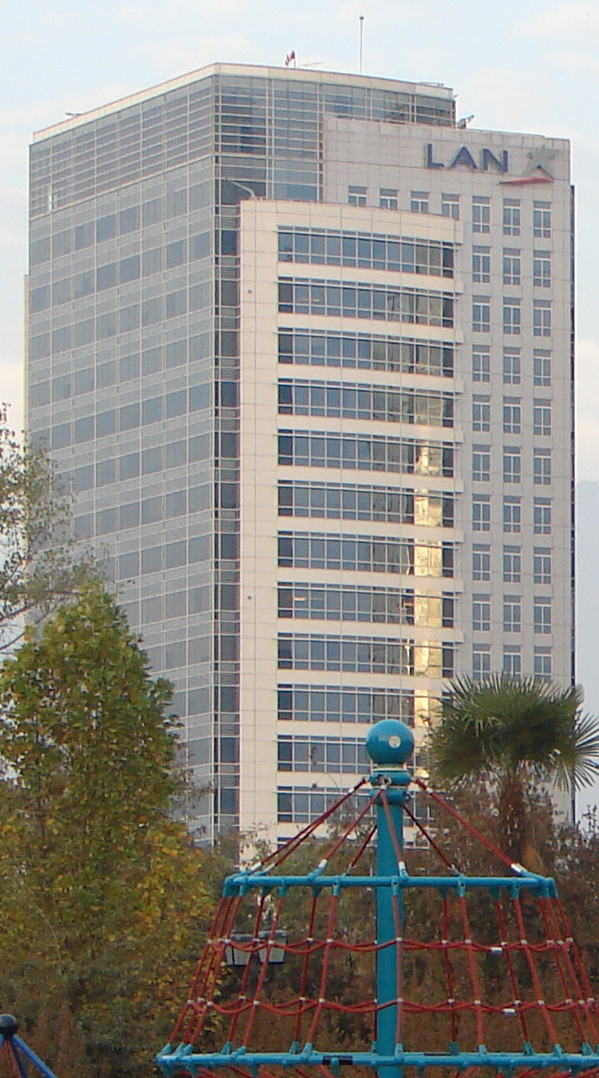
LATAM Airlines corporate headquarters

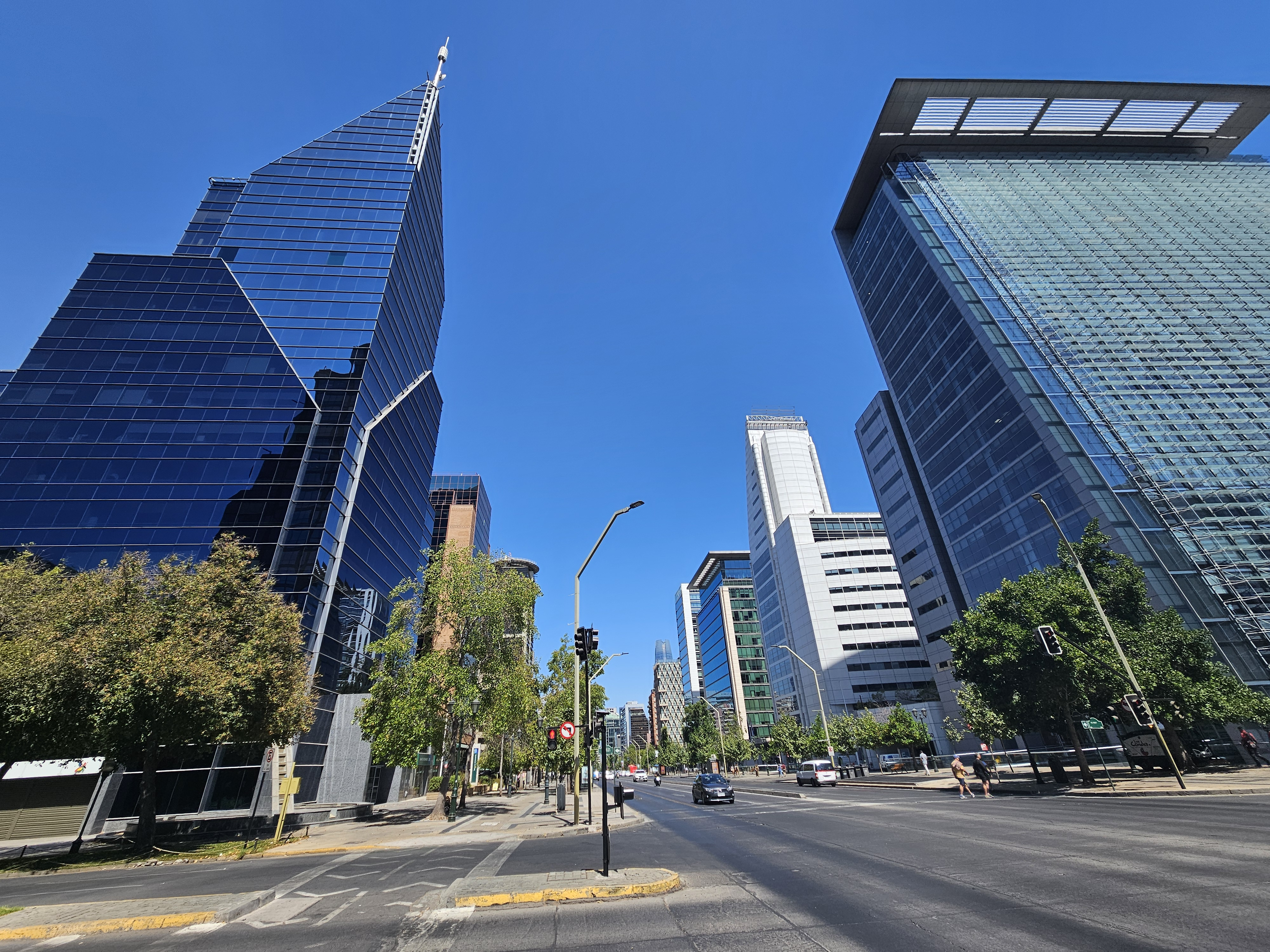
Apoquindo Avenue in El Golf district

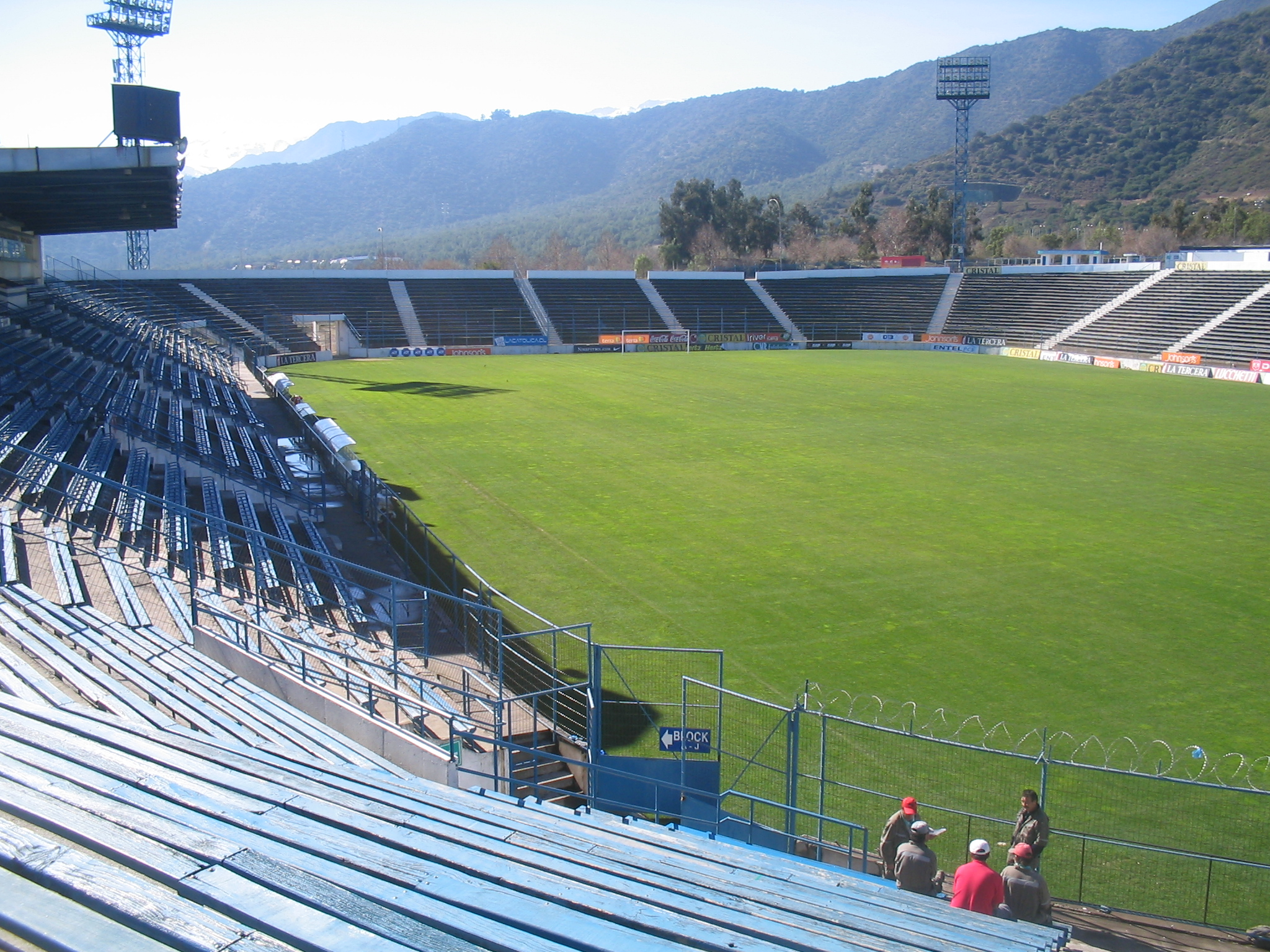
Claro Arena sports stadium

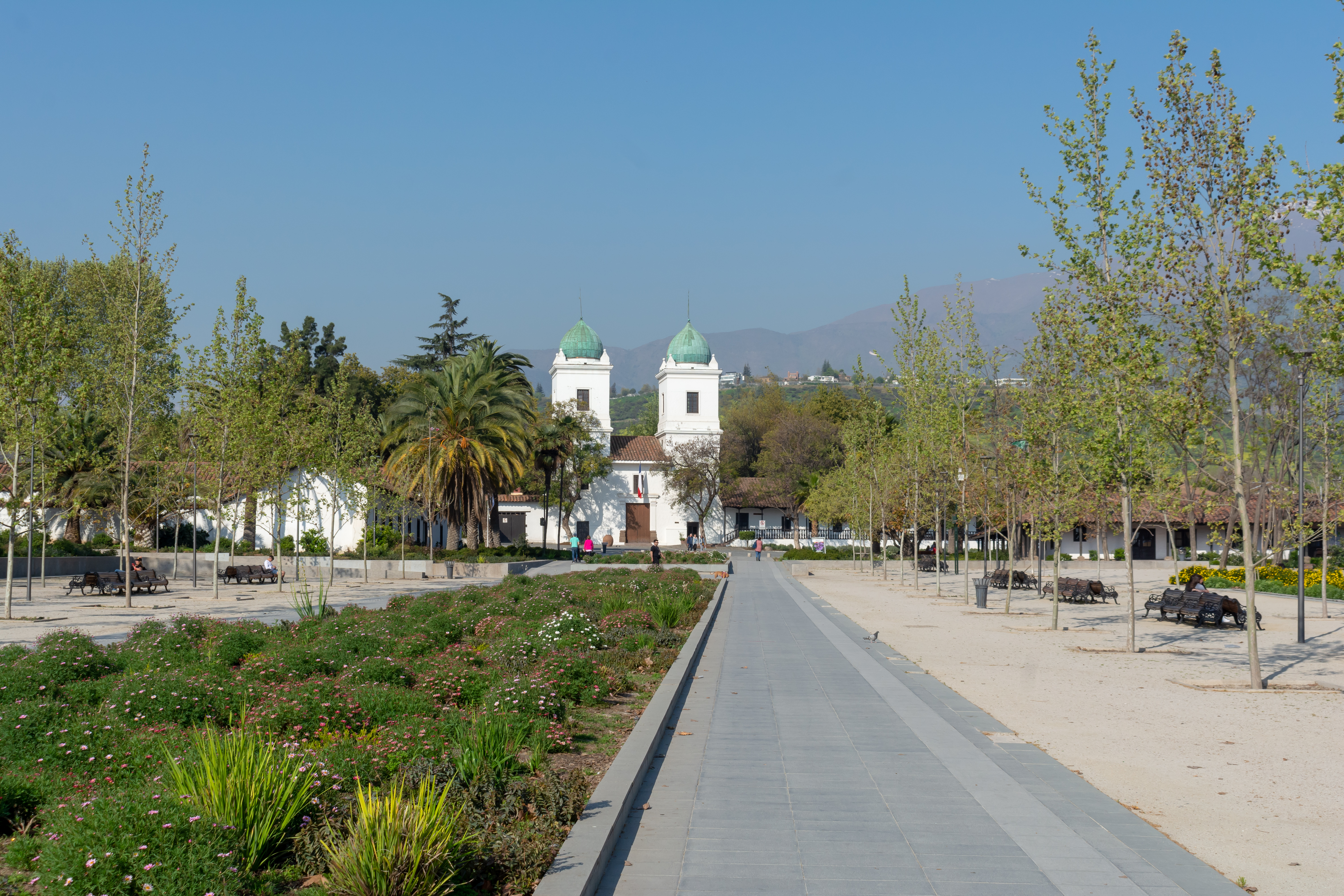
Los Dominicos Park

== See also ==
- Santiago, Chile
- Sanhattan
- Providencia, Chile
- Vitacura
- La Reina
