= Opinion polling for the 2025 Chilean presidential election =

In the run-up to the 2025 Chilean presidential election, opinion polls are conducted to assess the intention to vote in Chile during the presidential term of Gabriel Boric. The date range for these opinion polls runs from the first measurement in October 2022, to the day the election is held, 16 November 2025.

Various polls are listed below in reverse chronological order (with the most recent polls first). The order considers the last day of the sampling and only when that period is not known, the date of publication of the poll is shown.

== Second round ==
Opinion polls for the second round of the 2025 Chilean presidential election. Each point represents a poll, each line is a local regression that represents the two candidates.

Pollster	Date			Would not vote	DK/NR
Pollster	Date	Jara UpCh	Kast CpCh	Would not vote	DK/NR
LCN	8 Dec 2025	40.3%	59.7%	—	
Panel Ciudadano	5 Dec 2025	36%	50%	14%	
Cadem	3-5 Dec 2025	36%	47%	17%	
Start of the two-week polling silence period (30 November 2025)
Encuesta Nacional	30 Nov 2025	39%	61%	—	
Cadem	29 Nov 2025	34%	46%	20%	
Activa	29 Nov 2025	31.6%	45.2%	17.7%	5.5%
Panel Ciudadano	28 Nov 2025	34%	50%	16%	
Criteria	27 Nov 2025	35%	51%	14%	
Data Influye	22-27 Nov 2025	34%	59%	3%	14%
Atlas Intel	22-26 Nov 2025	35%	56.9%	8.1%	
Gallup Marketing & Asesoría	20-26 Nov 2025	38%	59%	3%	
Pew Research Center	19-26 Nov 2025	40.4%	59.6%	—	
CB	18-23 Nov 2025	36.7%	50.9%	12.4%	
Criteria	23 Nov 2025	36%	50%	14%	
Cadem	21 Nov 2025	34%	46%	20%	
Panel Ciudadano	21 Nov 2025	35%	50%	15%	
ICSO-UDP	18-21 Nov 2025	34%	44%	11%	11%
Panel Ciudadano	21 Nov 2025	35%	50%	15%	
Black & White	18–20 Nov 2025	35%	56%	9%	
Gallup Marketing & Asesoría	17–19 Nov 2025	39%	55%	6%	
Pew Research Center	17–18 Nov 2025	38.3%	61.7%	—	
Panel Ciudadano	17 Nov 2025	34%	54%	12%	
First round (16 November 2025)
Cadem	13–14 Nov 2025	35%	46%	19%	
Cadem	10–12 Nov 2025	34%	44%	22%	
Panel Ciudadano	6–7 Nov 2025	33%	47%	20%	
Cadem	5–7 Nov 2025	36%	47%	17%	
Panel Ciudadano	30–31 Oct 2025	32%	46%	22%	
Atlas Intel	25–30 Oct 2025	40%	46%	14%	
Criteria	27–29 Oct 2025	33%	51%	16%	
LCN	19–28 Oct 2025	44%	56%	—	
Cadem	22–24 Oct 2025	36%	48%	16%	
Panel Ciudadano	22–24 Oct 2025	32%	48%	20%	
Criteria	21–23 Oct 2025	35%	46%	19%	
Feedback	18–22 Oct 2025	34%	56%	10%	
Atlas Intel	15–19 Oct 2025	39%	47%	14%	
Panel Ciudadano	16–17 Oct 2025	33%	46%	21%	
Activa	15–17 Oct 2025	34.0%	42.0%	16.1%	7.8%
Cadem	15–17 Oct 2025	33%	49%	18%	
Criteria	14–17 Oct 2025	36%	48%	16%	—
CEP	22 Sep–17 Oct 2025	33%	41%	11%	16%
LCN	3–13 Oct 2025	44%	56%	—	
Panel Ciudadano	9–10 Oct 2025	31%	46%	23%	
Cadem	8–10 Oct 2025	36%	47%	17%	
Criteria	7–9 Oct 2025	33%	46%	21%	—
Signos Analytics	25 Sep–4 Oct 2025	35.9%	44.0%	7.2%	12.9%
Panel Ciudadano	2–3 Oct 2025	32%	49%	19%	
Criteria	30 Sep–2 Oct 2025	36%	47%	17%	—
Panel Ciudadano	25–26 Sep 2025	31%	47%	22%	
LCN	17–26 Sep 2025	46.0%	54.0%	—	
Criteria	23–25 Sep 2025	35%	44%	21%	—
Panel Ciudadano	18–19 Sep 2025	31%	47%	22%	
Criteria	15–17 Sep 2025	35%	46%	19%	—
Panel Ciudadano	11–12 Sep 2025	33%	46%	21%	
Cadem	10–12 Sep 2025	32%	43%	25%	
LCN	2–12 Sep 2025	43.7%	55.8%	—	
Criteria	11 Sep 2025	35%	46%	19%	—
Panel Ciudadano	4–5 Sep 2025	30%	48%	22%	
Cadem	3–5 Sep 2025	32%	42%	26%	
Criteria	2–4 Sep 2025	36%	45%	19%	—
Panel Ciudadano	28–29 Aug 2025	31%	46%	23%	
Activa	26–29 Aug 2025	32.9%	37.4%	19.9%	9.8%
LCN	16–28 Aug 2025	43.7%	56.4%	—	
Criteria	26–28 Aug 2025	33%	47%	20%	—
Panel Ciudadano	21–22 Aug 2025	31%	50%	19%	
Cadem	20–22 Aug 2025	31%	44%	25%	
Criteria	19–21 Aug 2025	32%	50%	18%	—
Activa	14–15 Aug 2025	31.9%	40.8%	3.7%	23.6%
Panel Ciudadano	14–15 Aug 2025	32%	48%	20%	
Criteria	12–14 Aug 2025	35%	47%	18%	
LCN	1–10 Aug 2025	46.5%	53.5%	—	
Panel Ciudadano	7–8 Aug 2025	32%	50%	18%	
Cadem	6–8 Aug 2025	34%	48%	18%	
Data Influye	30 Jul–3 Aug 2025	34%	41%	24%	
Cadem	30 Jul–1 Aug 2025	37%	49%	14%	
Activa	30 Jul–1 Aug 2025	33.5%	41.1%	4.8%	20.5%
Panel Ciudadano	30–31 Jul 2025	33%	49%	18%	
Criteria	29–31 Jul 2025	34%	45%	21%	
LCN	12–21 Jul 2025	45.8%	54.2%	—	
Criteria	15–17 Jul 2025	34%	47%	19%	
Cadem	9–11 Jul 2025	36%	47%	17%	
Data Influye	1–6 Jul 2025	43.7%	43.9%	12.4%	
Criteria	1–3 Jul 2025	35%	42%	23%	
Panel Ciudadano	29–30 Jun 2025	34%	46%	20%	
Cadem	25–27 Jun 2025	30%	50%	11%	9%
LCN	13–21 Jun 2025	46.2%	53.8%	—	
Cadem	7–9 May 2025	30%	45%	0%	25%

== First round ==
=== Official candidates ===
Opinion polls for the first round of the 2025 Chilean presidential election. Each point represents a poll, each line is a local regression and represents one of the officially registered candidates.

Polling firm	Date									Other	DK/NA
Polling firm	Date	Jara UpCh	Kast PRCh	Matthei ChGU	Kaiser PNL	Parisi PDG	Ominami Ind.	Mayne- Nicholls Ind.	Artés Ind.	Other	DK/NA
Start of the two-week polling silence period (2 November 2025)
Panel Ciudadano	30–31 Oct 2025	**26%**	21%	14%	14%	10%	1%	3%	1%	5%	5%
Activa	28–31 Oct 2025	**24.9%**	16.9%	11.2%	12.2%	14.0%	1.9%	3.4%	0.6%	6.2%	8.7%
Atlas Intel	25–30 Oct 2025	**33.2%**	16.8%	13.9%	16.8%	14.2%	1.0%	1.9%	0.1%	2.0%	0.2%
Black & White	28–29 Oct 2025	**30%**	23%	17%	20%	7%	1%	3%	1%	—	
Criteria	27–29 Oct 2025	**27%**	23%	14%	15%	9%	2%	3%	1%	—	6%
Data Influye	23–29 Oct 2025	**27%**	20%	11%	13%	9%	2%	3%	1%	7%	7%
LCN	17–28 Oct 2025	**33.5%**	17.7%	19.3%	19.3%	4.5%	0.7%	4.3%	0%	—	
Second presidential debate (26 October 2025)
Cadem	22–24 Oct 2025	**27%**	20%	13%	14%	11%	1%	4%	1%	9%	
Panel Ciudadano	22–24 Oct 2025	**25%**	22%	16%	13%	11%	1%	2%	1%	5%	4%
Criteria	21–23 Oct 2025	**28%**	23%	13%	13%	9%	2%	4%	1%	—	7%
Black & White	21–22 Oct 2025	**29%**	25%	19%	18%	6%	0%	3%	0%	—	
ICSO-UDP	17–21 Oct 2025	**26%**	24%	14%	10%	9%	1%	2%	0%	—	14%
Atlas Intel	15–19 Oct 2025	**32.7%**	20.1%	13.8%	13.4%	13.2%	0.7%	2.1%	1.0%	2.7%	0.4%
Panel Ciudadano	16–17 Oct 2025	**24%**	23%	16%	13%	9%	1%	2%	1%	5%	6%
Activa	15–17 Oct 2025	**25.4%**	18.7%	12.6%	8.9%	10.4%	3.0%	2.1%	0.6%	9.8%	8.5%
Cadem	15–17 Oct 2025	**26%**	22%	14%	12%	11%	1%	4%	1%	9%	
Criteria	14–17 Oct 2025	**29%**	24%	15%	12%	9%	1%	3%	0%	—	7%
Black & White	14–15 Oct 2025	**30%**	27%	18%	16%	4%	0%	3%	1%	—	
LCN	3–13 Oct 2025	**36.0%**	20.7%	18.3%	16.7%	2.3%	0.7%	4.7%	0.7%	—	
Panel Ciudadano	9–10 Oct 2025	24%	**25%**	17%	10%	8%	1%	3%	1%	6%	5%
Criteria	7–9 Oct 2025	**26%**	**26%**	17%	10%	8%	1%	3%	1%	—	8%
Black & White	7–8 Oct 2025	**31%**	25%	17%	14%	7%	1%	4%	1%	—	
Signos Analytics	25 Sep–4 Oct 2025	**28.3%**	24.2%	13.8%	8.1%	8.8%	2%	1.7%	0.5%	2.3%	10.2%
Panel Ciudadano	2–3 Oct 2025	**27%**	25%	16%	11%	8%	1%	2%	1%	5%	4%
Cadem	1–3 Oct 2025	**27%**	23%	15%	11%	10%	1%	4%	0%	9%	
Criteria	30 Sep–2 Oct 2025	**27%**	26%	17%	10%	8%	1%	4%	1%	—	6%
Studio Público	26–30 Sep 2025	**37.5%**	23.9%	11.9%	14.7%	5.1%	0.8%	3.1%	0%	1.1%	1.9%
Panel Ciudadano	25–26 Sep 2025	**25%**	**25%**	16%	10%	9%	2%	3%	0%	5%	5%
Cadem	24–26 Sep 2025	**26%**	23%	17%	11%	9%	1%	5%	0%	8%	
Activa	23–26 Sep 2025	**23.9%**	17.8%	11.7%	10.1%	11.8%	1.4%	2.8%	0.7%	11.3%	8.5%
Data Influye	22–26 Sep 2025	**27%**	26%	15%	8%	7%	1%	5%	1%	6%	4%
La Cosa Nostra	17–26 Sep 2025	**37.7%**	22.2%	18.2%	13.8%	2.8%	1.0%	4.0%	0.7%	—	
Criteria	23–25 Sep 2025	**30%**	24%	14%	10%	9%	2%	3%	1%	—	7%
ICSO-UDP	22–25 Sep 2025	**27.0%**	24.6%	12.2%	9.6%	9.6%	1.1%	4.8%	0.5%	—	10.6%
Black & White	23–24 Sep 2025	**30%**	26%	19%	11%	6%	1%	4%	1%	3%	
Data Veritas	17–20 Sep 2025	**32.4%**	22.2%	17.1%	15.2%	7.5%	0.1%	3.2%	0.5%	1.9%	—
Panel Ciudadano	18–19 Sep 2025	23%	**25%**	17%	9%	10%	1%	4%	1%	5%	5%
Cadem	17 Sep 2025	**26%**	24%	16%	9%	11%	1%	5%	1%	7%	
Black & White	16–17 Sep 2025	**28.9%**	25.9%	19.7%	12.2%	4.3%	0.7%	5.5%	0.9%	0.6%	1.5%
Criteria	15–17 Sep 2025	**29%**	25%	16%	10%	8%	1%	3%	1%	—	7%
Panel Ciudadano	11–12 Sep 2025	**24%**	**24%**	16%	10%	9%	2%	4%	1%	5%	5%
Criteria	11 Sep 2025	**29%**	27%	13%	10%	7%	2%	3%	1%	—	8%
Atlas Intel	10–14 Sep 2025	**38.9%**	24.7%	11.8%	9.0%	14.5%	—	—	—	0%	1.2%
Cadem	10–12 Sep 2025	**26%**	25%	18%	8%	11%	1%	3%	1%	7%	
Black & White	10–11 Sep 2025	25.7%	**31.6%**	17.9%	8.7%	7.1%	0.9%	4.0%	0.9%	1.5%	1.8%
Signos Analytics	9–14 Sep 2025	**28.3%**	25.4%	13.8%	6.8%	9%	1.5%	1.2%	0.3%	2.5%	11.2%
LCN	2–12 Sep 2025	**36.2%**	24.7%	20.2%	11.8%	2.2%	1.2%	3.2%	0.7%	—	
First presidential debate (10 September 2025)
Panel Ciudadano	4–5 Sep 2025	24%	**27%**	18%	6%	10%	2%	2%	1%	10%	—
Cadem	3–5 Sep 2025	**28%**	26%	16%	8%	11%	1%	2%	1%	7%	
Criteria	2–4 Sep 2025	**29%**	27%	17%	9%	7%	1%	2%	0%	—	8%
Black & White	2–3 Sep 2025	**31.9%**	27.9%	18.2%	9.6%	5.1%	1.6%	1.8%	0.6%	1.2%	2.2%
Data Influye	27–31 Aug 2025	**27%**	22%	13%	6%	6%	2%	2%	1%	9%	13%
Panel Ciudadano	28–29 Aug 2025	24%	**28%**	14%	7%	10%	2%	2%	0%	5%	8%
Cadem	27–29 Aug 2025	26%	**27%**	14%	8%	11%	3%	2%	0%	9%	
Activa	26–29 Aug 2025	**32.2%**	25.4%	17.1%	7.2%	11,1%	3.4%	1.6%	2.0%	—	
Activa	26–29 Aug 2025	**24.6%**	19.4%	13.1%	5.5%	8.5%	2.6%	1.2%	1.5%	10.5%	13.1%
LCN	16–28 Aug 2025	**36.0%**	25.2%	17.3%	11.8%	4.3%	1.3%	3.5%	0.5%	—	
Criteria	26–28 Aug 2025	27%	**28%**	14%	8%	9%	2%	2%	1%	9%	
Black & White	26–27 Aug 2025	**32.0%**	29.9%	14.7%	10.8%	4,.5%	1.7%	1.9%	0.9%	2.0%	1.0%
Atlas Intel	20–25 Aug 2025	**33.2%**	21.6%	18.7%	9.2%	15.8%	—	—	—	1.5%	
Panel Ciudadano	21–22 Aug 2025	25%	**28%**	14%	8%	9%	2%	1%	1%	6%	6%
Cadem	20–22 Aug 2025	27%	**28%**	14%	7%	11%	1%	1%	1%	9%	
Criteria	19–21 Aug 2025	28%	**30%**	14%	8%	8%	2%	2%	1%	—	7%
Black & White	19–20 Aug 2025	30%	**35%**	14%	11%	5%	0%	2%	0%	2%	1%

=== Opinion polls before candidate registration ===
Potential candidates are arranged on the left-right axis according to the coalition or party they belong to, with independents, who are outside any coalition, to the right of the table. The highest percentage for each survey is shown shaded and in bold.

==== After the Unity for Chile primary ====
Polling firm	Date	Sample size	Margin of error						Other	DK/NA
Polling firm	Date	Sample size	Margin of error	Jara UPCh	Parisi PDG	Matthei UDI	Kast PLR	Kaiser PNL	Other	DK/NA
Data Influye	1–6 Jul 2025	1.094	±2.9%	39%	5%	15%	23%	7%	7%	
Cadem	2–4 Jul 2025	703	±3.7%	26%	10%	18%	22%	6%	—	10%
Criteria	1–3 Jul 2025	1,002	N.A.	31%	9%	18%	22%	8%	—	9%
B&W	1-2 Jul 2025	929	±3.2%	39%	5%	18%	25%	9%	4%	
Activa	30 Jun-1 Jul 2025	1,006	±3.1%	33.8%	8.9%	16.8%	17.3%	4.3%	15.3%	
Panel Ciudadano	29-30 Jun 2025	3,873	±2%	26%	7%	19%	23%	9%	11%	5%
Atlas Intel	27–30 Jun 2025	3,869	±2%	38%	15.2%	18.5%	20.2%	5.8%	2.4%	

==== After the official announcement of candidates ====
Polling firm	Date														Other	DK/NA
Polling firm	Date	Jara PC	Winter FA	ME-O Ind.	Mulet FRVS	Tohá PPD	Undurraga PDC	Parisi PDG	Matthei UDI	Muñoz PSC	Kast PLR	Kaiser PNL	Carter Ind.	Mayne-Nicholls Ind.	Other	DK/NA
Cadem	25–27 Jun 2025	16%	2%	—	—	4%	—	10%	10%	—	**24%**	4%	—	—	4%	26%
Cadem	17–19 Jun 2025	13%	4%	—	—	6%	—	7%	12%	—	**19%**	6%	—	—	4%	29%
Cadem	11–13 Jun 2025	13%	4%	—	—	6%	—	5%	14%	—	**18%**	5%	—	—	5%	30%
Cadem	4–6 Jun 2025	8%	5%	—	—	7%	—	5%	16%	—	**17%**	7%	—	—	3%	32%
ICSO-UDP	30 May–4 Jun 2025	7.3%	5.5%	2.7%	0.5%	7.8%	—	5.7%	**22.8%**	1%	22.6%	8.1%	—	1.8%	—	15%
Criteria	2–4 Jun 2025	7%	5%	—	—	8%	—	4%	**24%**	—	20%	8%	—	—	10%	14%
Data Influye	28 May–1 Jun 2025	11%	6%	2%	—	12%	—	3%	**17%**	—	16%	9%	—	—	8%	17%
Activa	28–30 May 2025	7.4%	3.6%	—	—	6.4%	—	5.8%	**21.5%**	—	17.5%	7.4%	—	—	17.3%	13.1%
Cadem	28–30 May 2025	7%	3%	—	—	8%	—	6%	**19%**	—	16%	7%	—	—	3%	31%
Atlas Intel	21–26 May 2025	9.9%	11%	—	—	**16.7%**	—	12.1%	16.6	—	15,6%	11.2%	—	—	6.9%	
Cadem	22–23 May 2025	5%	5%	—	—	10%	—	4%	**17%**	—	16%	6%	—	—	5%	32%
Panel Ciudadano	20 May 2025	8%	7%	3%	—	10%	—	5%	**22%**	—	17%	9%	2%	—	17%	
Cadem	14–16 May 2025	5%	6%	—	—	10%	—	3%	**17%**	—	**17%**	6%	—	—	6%	30%
B&W	13-14 May 2025	13%	8%	—	1%	15%	—	4%	**20%**	1%	15%	17%	—	—	—	7%
Criteria	12–14 May 2025	5%	5%	2%	—	10%	—	2%	**26%**	—	17%	10%	—	—	10%	13%
Cadem	7–9 May 2025	4%	6%	—	—	12%	—	4%	**20%**	—	14%	6%	—	1%	5%	28%
ICSO-UDP	5–9 May 2025	6%	5%	3%	0%	11%	1%	5%	**23%**	1%	19%	10%	—	2%	—	15%
Cadem	30 Apr–2 May 2025	6%	6%	—	—	11%	—	4%	**22%**	—	13%	10%	—	—	5%	23%

==== 2025 ====
Polling firm	Date																		Other	DK/NA
Polling firm	Date	Artés PC(AP)	Jadue PC	Jara PC	Vallejo PC	Vodanovic FA	ME-O Ind.	Mulet FREVS	Bachelet PS	Tohá PPD	Mirosevic PL	Orrego Ind.	Parisi PDG	Matthei UDI	Kast PLR	Kaiser PNL	Carter Ind.	Lorenzini Ind.	Other	DK/NA
Activa	26–28 Feb 2025	—	1.7%	—	1.8%	3.6%	—	—	**15.9%**	1.9%	—	—	1.7%	24.3%	10.6%	9.7%	—	1.5%	13.9%	13.4%
Criteria	24-26 Feb 2025	—	—	—	2%	3%	—	—	**18%**	3%	—	—	—	26%	10%	11%	—	—	15%	
Signos	9–14 Feb 2025	—	—	—	2.6%	7.8%	—	1.2%	**17.3%**	8.8%	—	—	1.8%	23.4%	10.2%	15.8%	3.7%	—	5.7%	1.7%
Panel Ciudadano (sólo inmigrantes)	6-7 Feb 2025	—	—	—	1%	2%	1%	—	**15%**	2%	—	—	2%	24%	12%	13%	3%	—	14%	
Cadem	5–7 Feb 2025	—	1%	1%	1%	4%	—	—	12%	3%	2%	—	1%	20%	8%	**13%**	—	—	4%	30%
Criteria	3–5 Feb 2025	—	—	—	2%	3%	—	—	**13%**	3%	—	—	2%	26%	9%	11%	—	—	12%	19%
Activa	30–31 Jan 2025	0.3%	—	0.4%	1.1%	2.8%	1.5%	—	**12.2%**	3.2%	0.6%	0.3%	1.1%	27,4%	9.6%	7.7%	0.6%	3%	16%	15%
Atlas Intel	27–31 Jan 2025	—	—	—	6.1%	9.3%	—	—	5.6%	13.1%	—	—	6.1%	19.4%	8.7%	**19%**	—	—	12.7%	
Signos	22–27 Jan 2025	—	—	—	3.9%	13.2%	—	—	4.2%	6.1%	—	—	2.8%	24.8%	11.3%	**15,3%**	5.7%	—	10.6%	2,1%
Panel Ciudadano	14–15 Jan 2025	—	1%	—	2%	1%	1%	—	7%	3%	—	—	2%	26%	**11%**	7%	1%	—	38%	
Cadem	8–10 Jan 2025	—	—	—	2%	3%	—	—	5%	2%	—	—	2%	23%	9%	**10%**	—	—	6%	38%
Criteria	6–8 Jan 2025	—	—	—	3%	5%	2%	—	**11%**	3%	—	—	—	28%	10%	7%	2%	—	11%	18%

==== 2024 ====
Polling firm	Date															
Polling firm	Date	Jadue	Vallejo	Vodanovic	Winter	Bachelet PS	Tohá PPD	Piñera ChV	Matthei UDI	Kast PLR	Parisi PDG	ME-O	Carter Ind.	Kaiser Ind.	Others	DK/NR
Polling firm	Date	Communist Party of Chile				Socialist Party of Chile	Party for Democracy (Chile)	Chile Vamos	Independent Democratic Union	Republican Party (Chile, 2019)		Independent			Others	DK/NR
Cadem	12–14 Jun 2024	2%	3%	—	—	6%	3%	—	20%	**14%**	2%	—	1%	2%	6%	41%
Criteria	31 May – 3 Jun 2024	—	4%	—	—	10%	3%	—	25%	**13%**	3%	2%	—	—	2%	38%
Activa	29–31 May 2024	2,4%	5,2%	—	—	9,8%	2,4%	—	26,2%	**12,1%**	1,8%	—	—	2,3%	24,2%	13,6%
Panel Ciudadano	13–14 May 2024	—	6%	2%	—	11%	5%	—	27%	**18%**	4%	3%	4%	3%	2%	15%
Cadem	8–10 May 2024	—	3%	—	1%	3%	3%	—	24%	**14%**	2%	1%	2%	2%	8%	37%
La Cosa Nostra	24 Apr – 5 May 2024	—	7,4%	—	5,1%	**16,2%**	10,7%	—	33,6%	12,6%	1,8%	2,0%	—	5,2%	5,4%	—
Feedback	26 Apr – 3 May 2024	—	2%	2%	2%	11%	5%	—	26%	**16%**	—	—	2%	7%	5%	21%
Criteria	26–29 Apr 2024	2%	6%	—	—	10%	4%	—	30%	**12%**	3%	2%	—	2%	2%	27%
Activa	24–26 Apr 2024	—	3,5%	—	—	7,1%	—	—	28,5%	**15,6%**	—	2,2%	—	—	22,7%	20,4%
Cadem	17–19 Apr 2024	—	3%	—	—	7%	3%	—	24%	**14%**	1%	1%	1%	2%	6%	38%
Cadem	3–5 Apr 2024	1%	3%	—	—	4%	2%	—	25%	**12%**	1%	—	1%	1%	8%	42%
Criteria	28 Mar – 1 Apr 2024	—	6%	—	—	7%	2%	—	27%	**15%**	3%	—	—	2%	3%	35%
Activa	27–28 Mar 2024	—	4,5%	—	—	8,1%	—	—	24,9%	**11,7%**	2,5%	1,6%	—	2,5%	26,6%	17,6%
Cadem	13–15 Mar 2024	1%	3%	1%	—	4%	2%	—	21%	**12%**	2%	—	2%	2%	10%	40%
Criteria	1–4 Mar 2024	—	5%	—	—	7%	2%	—	31%	**17%**	—	2%	—	—	4%	32%
Activa	28–29 Feb 2024	—	3,3%	—	—	9,5%	2,1%	—	26,2%	**10,6%**	1,7%	—	1,6%	1,6%	24.8%	18,6%
Panel Ciudadano	23–24 Feb 2024	—	6%	—	2%	10%	4%	—	30%	**16%**	4%	3%	4%	3%	2%	16%
Cadem	14–16 Feb 2024	1%	4%	—	—	6%	2%	—	22%	**19%**	1%	—	3%	1%	8%	33%
Death of former president Sebastián Piñera (6 February)
Activa	25–26 Jan 2024	—	5,1%	—	—	6,8%	1,5%	11,1%	17,8%	**13,3%**	1,7%	—	—	—	20,7%	22,0%
Cadem	10–12 Jan 2024	1%	2%	—	—	5%	2%	5%	16%	**14%**	1%	—	1%	—	8%	45%
Criteria	4–8 Jan 2024	—	6%	—	—	10%	—	4%	24%	**17%**	3%	2%	2%	—	17%	15%

==== 2023 ====
Polling firm	Date	Sample size															Others	Blank vote / Undecided
Polling firm	Date	Sample size	Jadue	Vallejo	Siches	Elizalde	Bachelet	Tohá	Sichel	Piñera	Matthei	Kast	Marinovic	Parisi	Carter	Jiles	Others	Blank vote / Undecided
Polling firm	Date	Sample size	Communist Party of Chile		Ind.	Socialist Party of Chile		Party for Democracy (Chile)	Chile Vamos		Independent Democratic Union	Republican Party (Chile, 2019)			Ind.	Ind.	Others	Blank vote / Undecided
Cadem	8-10 November 2023	710	1	5			4	4	-	2	19	17	-	4	2	-	8	34
Research Chile	22 October 2023	832	1	7	-	-	9	9	2	2	26	18	-	2	2	-	-	13
Research Chile	22-26 September 2023	813	1	6	-	-	8	11	1	2	28	17	-	2	2	-	-	16
Research Chile	3-5 July 2023	786	1	8	-	-	5	9	1	1	23	22	-	2	5	0		16
Cadem	5-7 July 2023	705	-	5.2	-	-	5.2	-	-	8.6	13.8	36.2	-	3.4	3.4	-		
Research Chile	5-7 Jun 2023	805	1	9	-	-	7	10	1	0	22	18	-	2	5	0		
Research Chile	8-10 May 2023	765	1	9	-		7	5	2	1	22	27	2	2	6	1		11
Cadem	3-5 May 2023	703	1	4	–	–	2	1	-	4	13	20	1	2	4	–	7 (Note: Mario Marcel with 4%, Ignacio Briones with 2%, Vlado Mirosevic with 1%)	42
Research Chile	10-12 Apr 2023	823	1	6	–	–	4	6	1	0	25	12	1	4	10	–	7 (Note: Mario Marcel with 4%, Ignacio Briones with 2%, Vlado Mirosevic with 1%)	22
Activa/Pulso Ciudadano	21-24 Mar 2023	912	1.7	4	–	–	5.4	1.5	–	6.8	16.3	15.7	–	2.2	3.9	–	22.1 (Note: Leonardo Farkas with 3.6, Marco Enríquez-Ominami with 1.7, others with 17)	20.8
Research Chile	6-8 Mar 2023	882	2	9	–	–	6	6	2	–	25	11	2	4	5	1	8 (Note: Mario Marcel with 4, Ignacio Briones with 3, Germán Codina with 1, Manuel Monsalve with 0)	20
Research Chile	6-7 Feb 2023	805	2	9	–	–	5	4	2	–	25	12	1	4	3	0	6 (Note: Mario Marcel with 3, Ignacio Briones with 2, Germán Codina with 1, Manuel Monsalve with 0)	26
Research Chile	9–10 Jan 2023	803	2	8	–	–	–	6	3	–	27	17	3	4	3	1	3	20

==== 2022 ====
Polling firm	Date	Sample size															Others	Blank vote / Undecided
Polling firm	Date	Sample size	Jadue	Vallejo	Siches	Elizalde	Bachelet	Tohá	Sichel	Piñera	Matthei	Kast	Marinovic	Parisi	Carter	Jiles	Others	Blank vote / Undecided
Polling firm	Date	Sample size	Communist Party of Chile		Ind.	Socialist Party of Chile		Party for Democracy (Chile)	Chile Vamos		Independent Democratic Union	Republican Party (Chile, 2019)			Ind.	Ind.	Others	Blank vote / Undecided
Encuestas Chile	24 Mar – 31 Dec 2022	4,782	1	1	0	0	1	1	3	1	**15**	**12**	1	8	2	0	0	38
Cadem	28–30 Dec 2022	705	1	–	–	–	3	1	1	4	**9**	**13**	–	1	1	–	12	54
Research Chile	13-15 Dec 2022	800	2.1	9.5	–	–	–	5.3	3.3	–	**20.6**	**15.8**	2.5	3	–	0.6	19	25
Cadem	26–28 Oct 2022	706	1	3	1	1	3	2	1	5	**8**	**11**	–	5	1	1	7	50
Election Results	19 Dec 2021	–	**55.9** (Note: Gabriel Boric as Apruebo Dignidad candidate)						44.1 (Note: José Antonio Kast)					–	–	–	–	–
Election Results	21 Nov 2021	–	**25.8**			11.6 (Note: Yasna Provoste)			12.8 (Note: Sebastián Sichel)			**27.9**		12.8	–	–	9.1 (Note: Marco Enríquez-Ominami (7.6%) and Eduardo Artés (1.5%))	–

== Other polling ==
The following polls were conducted for hypothetical second-round matchups.

=== Jara vs. Parisi ===
Pollster	Date	Jara UpCh	Parisi PDG	Would not vote	Undecided/No answer
Cadem	20–22 Aug 2025	33%	33%	34%	
Criteria	19–21 Aug 2025	34%	31%	35%	—
Cadem	6–8 Aug 2025	36%	39%	25%	
Cadem	30 Jul – 1 Aug 2025	38%	38%	24%	
Cadem	25–27 Jun 2025	32%	44%	24%	

=== Jara vs. Matthei ===
Pollster	Date	Jara UpCh	Matthei ChV	Would not vote	Undecided/No answer
Panel Ciudadano	21–22 Aug 2025	29%	44%	27%	
Cadem	20–22 Aug 2025	33%	40%	27%	
Criteria	19–21 Aug 2025	32%	42%	26%	—
Activa	14–15 Aug 2025	31,2%	34,1%	4,7%	30%
Panel Ciudadano	14–15 Aug 2025	32%	42%	26%	
Criteria	12–14 Aug 2025	33%	42%	25%	
LCN	1–10 Aug 2025	42,6%	57,4%	—	
Panel Ciudadano	7–8 Aug 2025	32%	44%	24%	
Cadem	6–8 Aug 2025	37%	46%	17%	
Data Influye	30 Jul – 3 Aug 2025	38%	48%	13%	
Cadem	30 Jul – 1 Aug 2025	37%	42%	21%	
Activa	30 Jul – 1 Aug 2025	29,8%	40,4%	5,7%	24,1%
Panel Ciudadano	30–31 Jul 2025	32%	41%	27%	
Criteria	29–31 Jul 2025	34%	40%	26%	
LCN	12–21 Jul 2025	41,5%	58,5%	—	
Criteria	15–17 Jul 2025	34%	40%	26%	
Cadem	9–11 Jul 2025	37%	42%	21%	
Data Influye	1–6 Jul 2025	41%	43%	16%	
Criteria	1–3 Jul 2025	35%	40%	25%	
Panel Ciudadano	29–30 Jun 2025	32%	44%	24%	
Cadem	25–27 Jun 2025	31%	50%	9%	10%
LCN	18–24 May 2025	38,0%	62,0%	—	
Cadem	7–9 May 2025	24%	54%	0%	22%
Cadem	26–28 Mar 2025	20%	60%	1%	19%
Cadem	5–7 Mar 2025	17%	56%	2%	25%
Cadem	5–7 Feb 2025	20%	54%	1%	25%

=== Jara vs. Kaiser ===
Pollster	Date	Jara UpCh	Kaiser PNL	Would not vote	Undecided/No answer
Cadem	20–22 Aug 2025	36%	30%	34%	
Cadem	6–8 Aug 2025	41%	35%	24%	
Cadem	30 Jul – 1 Aug 2025	39%	32%	29%	
LCN	12–21 Jul 2025	49,3%	50,2%	—	
Cadem	25–27 Jun 2025	37%	31%	16%	16%
Cadem	7–9 May 2025	30%	37%	1%	32%

=== Matthei vs. Kast ===
Pollster	Date	Matthei ChV	Kast PRCh	Would not vote	Undecided/No answer
Cadem	20–22 Aug 2025	28%	36%	36%	
Activa	14–15 Aug 2025	27,1%	33,7%	8,1%	31,1%
Activa	30 Jul – 1 Aug 2025	25,7%	31,1%	8,0%	35,2%
Cadem	9–11 Jul 2025	31%	37%	32%	
Data Influye	1–6 Jul 2025	24%	28%	48%	
Panel Ciudadano	29–30 Jun 2025	32%	35%	33%	
Cadem	25–27 Jun 2025	34%	37%	14%	15%
Panel Ciudadano	20 May 2025	32%	30%	9%	29%
Cadem	7–9 May 2025	44%	30%	1%	25%
Cadem	26–28 Mar 2025	44%	34%	2%	20%
Cadem	5–7 Mar 2025	41%	31%	3%	25%
Cadem	5–7 Feb 2025	43%	29%	2%	26%
Cadem	8–10 Jan 2025	52%	28%	2%	18%
Cadem	11–13 Dec 2024	57%	21%	2%	20%
Activa	28–29 Nov 2024	39,9%	29,0%	—	31,1%
Cadem	27–29 Nov 2024	54%	27%	1%	18%
Panel Ciudadano	25–26 Nov 2024	40%	24%	29%	7%
Panel Ciudadano	28–29 Oct 2024	40%	24%	31%	5%
Panel Ciudadano	16–17 Sep 2024	44%	19%	29%	7%
Cadem	11–13 Sep 2024	61%	21%	2%	16%
Cadem	7–9 Aug 2024	61%	22%	3%	14%
Cadem	12–14 Jun 2024	52%	29%	2%	17%
Panel Ciudadano	12–13 Jun 2024	41%	23%	27%	9%
Cadem	3–5 Apr 2024	56%	25%	1%	18%
Panel Ciudadano	23–24 Feb 2024	48%	23%	26%	4%

=== Matthei vs. Kaiser ===
Pollster	Date	Matthei ChV	Kaiser PNL	Would not vote	Undecided/No answer
Cadem	25–27 Jun 2025	48%	19%	15%	18%
Cadem	7–9 May 2025	48%	21%	2%	29%
Cadem	26–28 Mar 2025	47%	27%	1%	25%
Cadem	5–7 Mar 2025	43%	32%	3%	22%
Cadem	5–7 Feb 2025	50%	27%	1%	22%
Cadem	8–10 Jan 2025	58%	21%	1%	20%
Cadem	11–13 Dec 2024	64%	13%	2%	21%

=== Enríquez-Ominami vs. Matthei ===
Pollster	Date	ME-O Ind.	Matthei ChV	Would not vote	Undecided/No answer
LCN	18–24 May 2025	37,0%	63,0%	—	
Cadem	5–7 Mar 2025	23%	51%	2%	24%
Cadem	27–29 Nov 2024	21%	60%	1%	18%
Cadem	12–14 Jun 2024	29%	57%	2%	12%

=== Enríquez-Ominami vs. Kast ===
Pollster	Date	ME-O Ind.	Kast PRCh	Would not vote	Undecided/No answer
Cadem	27–29 Nov 2024	31%	46%	1%	22%
Cadem	12–14 Jun 2024	37%	49%	1%	13%

=== Parisi vs. Matthei ===
Pollster	Date	Parisi PDG	Matthei ChV	Would not vote	Undecided/No answer
Cadem	25–27 Jun 2025	37%	39%	11%	13%
Cadem	7–9 May 2025	24%	48%	1%	27%

=== Parisi vs. Kast ===
Pollster	Date	Parisi PDG	Kast PRCh	Would not vote	Undecided/No answer
Cadem	25–27 Jun 2025	29%	41%	13%	17%

=== Other scenarios ===
In addition to the second-round scenarios mentioned previously, pollsters conducted surveys with other possible pairings of presidential pre-candidates who later decided not to participate in the election or lost their pact's primary election.

Pollster	Date	Bachelet PS	Matthei UDI	Would not vote	Undecided/No answer
Cadem	5–7 Feb 2025	37%	45%	2%	16%
Cadem	8–10 Jan 2025	43%	47%	0%	10%
Cadem	11–13 Dec 2024	39%	51%	1%	9%
Criteria	29 Nov – 2 Dec 2024	32%	44%	24%	
Activa	28–29 Nov 2024	31,8%	46,4%	—	21,8%
Cadem	27–29 Nov 2024	34%	50%	1%	15%
Panel Ciudadano	25–26 Nov 2024	30%	47%	17%	6%
Panel Ciudadano	28–29 Oct 2024	31%	47%	17%	5%
Panel Ciudadano	16–17 Sep 2024	31%	47%	15%	7%
Cadem	11–13 Sep 2024	38%	54%	1%	7%
Cadem	7–9 Aug 2024	45%	49%	1%	5%
Criteria	1–5 Aug 2024	33%	45%	22%	
Criteria	28 Jun – 1 Jul 2024	35%	43%	22%	
Cadem	12–14 Jun 2024	42%	49%	0%	9%
Panel Ciudadano	12–13 Jun 2024	28%	45%	20%	7%
Cadem	3–5 Apr 2024	39%	53%	0%	8%
Panel Ciudadano	23–24 Feb 2024	32%	46%	17%	5%
Panel Ciudadano	20–21 Dec 2023	28%	45%	22%	5%

Pollster	Date	Bachelet PS	Kast PRCh	Would not vote	Undecided/No answer
Criteria	29 Nov – 2 Dec 2024	37%	36%	27%	
Activa	28–29 Nov 2024	36,7%	39,8%	—	23,5%
Cadem	27–29 Nov 2024	44%	39%	2%	15%
Panel Ciudadano	25–26 Nov 2024	34%	39%	21%	6%
Panel Ciudadano	28–29 Oct 2024	35%	40%	20%	5%
Panel Ciudadano	16–17 Sep 2024	35%	33%	23%	8%
Cadem	11–13 Sep 2024	49%	38%	2%	11%
Cadem	7–9 Aug 2024	52%	38%	2%	8%
Criteria	1–5 Aug 2024	40%	34%	26%	
Criteria	28 Jun – 1 Jul 2024	42%	32%	26%	
Cadem	12–14 Jun 2024	48%	42%	1%	9%
Panel Ciudadano	12–13 Jun 2024	34%	39%	19%	8%
Cadem	3–5 Apr 2024	46%	39%	1%	14%
Panel Ciudadano	23–24 Feb 2024	33%	43%	19%	6%
Panel Ciudadano	20–21 Dec 2023	36%	41%	19%	4%

Pollster	Date	Bachelet PS	Carter Ind.	Would not vote	Undecided/No answer
Panel Ciudadano	12–13 Jun 2024	33%	30%	26%	11%

Pollster	Date	Bachelet PS	Orrego Ind.	Would not vote	Undecided/No answer
Panel Ciudadano	16–17 Sep 2024	36%	15%	36%	13%

Pollster	Date	Frei DC	Matthei UDI	Would not vote	Undecided/No answer
Cadem	5–7 Feb 2025	25%	50%	1%	24%
Cadem	8–10 Jan 2025	29%	55%	0%	16%
Cadem	11–13 Dec 2024	29%	57%	1%	13%

Pollster	Date	Lagos W. PPD	Matthei UDI	Would not vote	Undecided/No answer
Cadem	5–7 Feb 2025	20%	53%	1%	26%

Pollster	Date	Marcel Ind.	Matthei UDI	Would not vote	Undecided/No answer
Cadem	5–7 Feb 2025	22%	55%	1%	22%
Cadem	11–13 Sep 2024	18%	67%	1%	14%
Cadem	7–9 Aug 2024	22%	65%	2%	11%

Pollster	Date	Marcel Ind.	Kast PRCh	Would not vote	Undecided/No answer
Cadem	11–13 Sep 2024	32%	42%	3%	23%
Cadem	7–9 Aug 2024	34%	43%	3%	20%

Pollster	Date	Matthei UDI	Carter Ind.	Would not vote	Undecided/No answer
Panel Ciudadano	12–13 Jun 2024	46%	15%	30%	9%

Pollster	Date	Mirosevic PL	Matthei UDI	Would not vote	Undecided/No answer
Cadem	5–7 Mar 2025	17%	57%	2%	24%
Cadem	27–29 Nov 2024	16%	62%	1%	21%

Pollster	Date	Mirosevic PL	Kast PRCh	Would not vote	Undecided/No answer
Cadem	27–29 Nov 2024	22%	47%	1%	30%

Pollster	Date	Winter FA	Kaiser PNL	Would not vote	Undecided/No answer
Cadem	7–9 May 2025	25%	37%	38%	

== See also ==
- Opinion polling for the 2021 Chilean presidential election
