= Chile Grande y Unido =

Great and United Chile Chile Grande y Unido
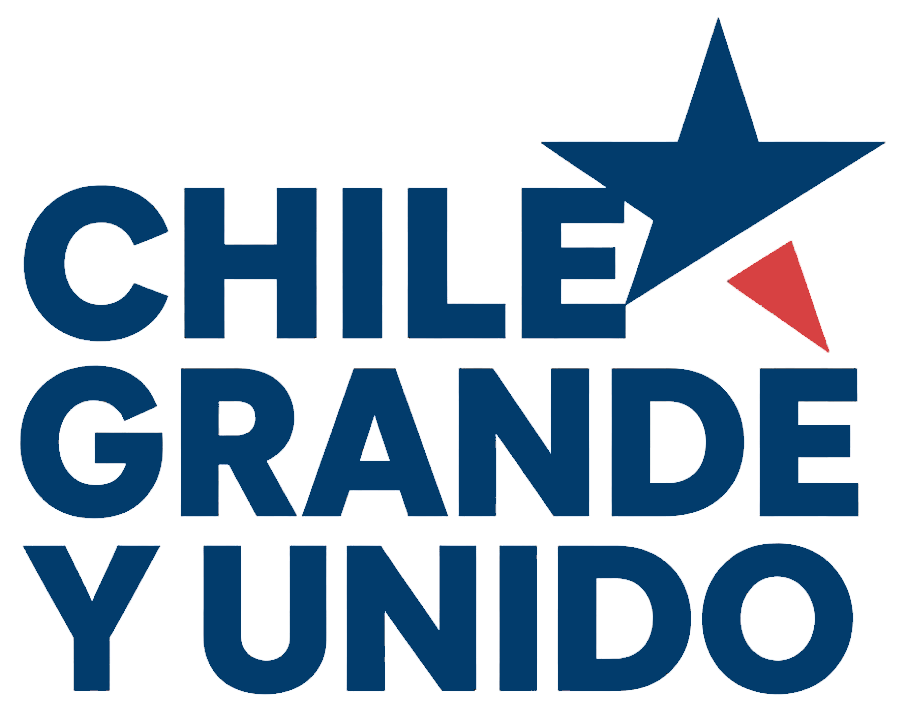
- Abbreviation: ChGU
- Leader: Evelyn Matthei
- Party presidents: Guillermo Ramírez (UDI); Rodrigo Galilea (RN); Juan Manuel Santa Cruz (Evópoli); Ximena Rincón (D)
- Founded: 16 August 2025
- Preceded by: Chile Podemos Más
- Ideology: Liberal conservatism Conservative liberalism Economic liberalism
- Political position: Centre-right to right-wing
- Coalition members: Chile Vamos • UDI • RN • Evópoli; Democrats
- Colours: Blue, White and Red
- Senate: 17 / 50
- Chamber of Deputies: 34 / 155

Chile Grande y Unido (lit. 'Great and United Chile') is a Chilean centre-right to right-wing electoral coalition founded by Chile Vamos member parties (UDI, RN, Evópoli) and the Democrats to compete the 2025 Chilean parliamentary election. All the constituent parties of the coalition support the candidacy of Evelyn Matthei for the 2025 presidential election.

== History ==
In the lead-up to the 2025 Chilean general election, the traditional Chilean right-wing political parties, Independent Democratic Union (UDI), National Renewal (RN), and Political Evolution (Evópoli), attempted to form a single parliamentary pact for all movements in opposition to the government of Gabriel Boric. The Republican Party of Chile participated in the negotiations, but subsequently rejected the invitation in favor of forming the Cambio por Chile alliance with the Christian Social Party and the National Libertarian Party.

After negotiations with the Republican Party failed, Chile Vamos members reached out to movements formed by former members of the defunct Concertación coalition who supported the "Reject" option in the 2022 constitutional referendum. Chile Vamos reached an agreement with the Democrats and formalized the creation of a list called Chile Grande y Unido (Great and United Chile). The list was registered in the Electoral Service (Servel) on 16 August 2025, at the same time as the registration of Evelyn Matthei's presidential candidacy. Amarillos por Chile, another "Concertaciónist" party that supported Matthei, presented a parliamentary list separate from the coalition.

== Composition ==
The coalition is made up of the following parties:

Coalition	Party	Abbr.	President	Ideology
Chile Vamos	Independent Democratic Union; Unión Demócrata Independiente	UDI	Guillermo Ramírez	Conservatism; Christian right Economic liberalism
Chile Vamos	National Renewal; Renovación Nacional	RN	Rodrigo Galilea	Liberal conservatism Economic liberalism
Chile Vamos	Political Evolution; Evolución Política	Evópoli	Juan Manuel Santa Cruz	Classic liberalism Economic liberalism Conservative liberalism
	Democrats Party of Chile; Partido Demócratas Chile	D	Ximena Rincón	Moderate conservatism Christian democracy Christian humanism
