= 2025 Chilean general election =

- Presidential election
- 16 November 2025 (first round); 14 December 2025 (second round)
- Opinion polls
- Registered: 15,779,102
- Turnout: 85.42% (first round) ▲38.09pp 85.14% (second round) ▲29.50pp
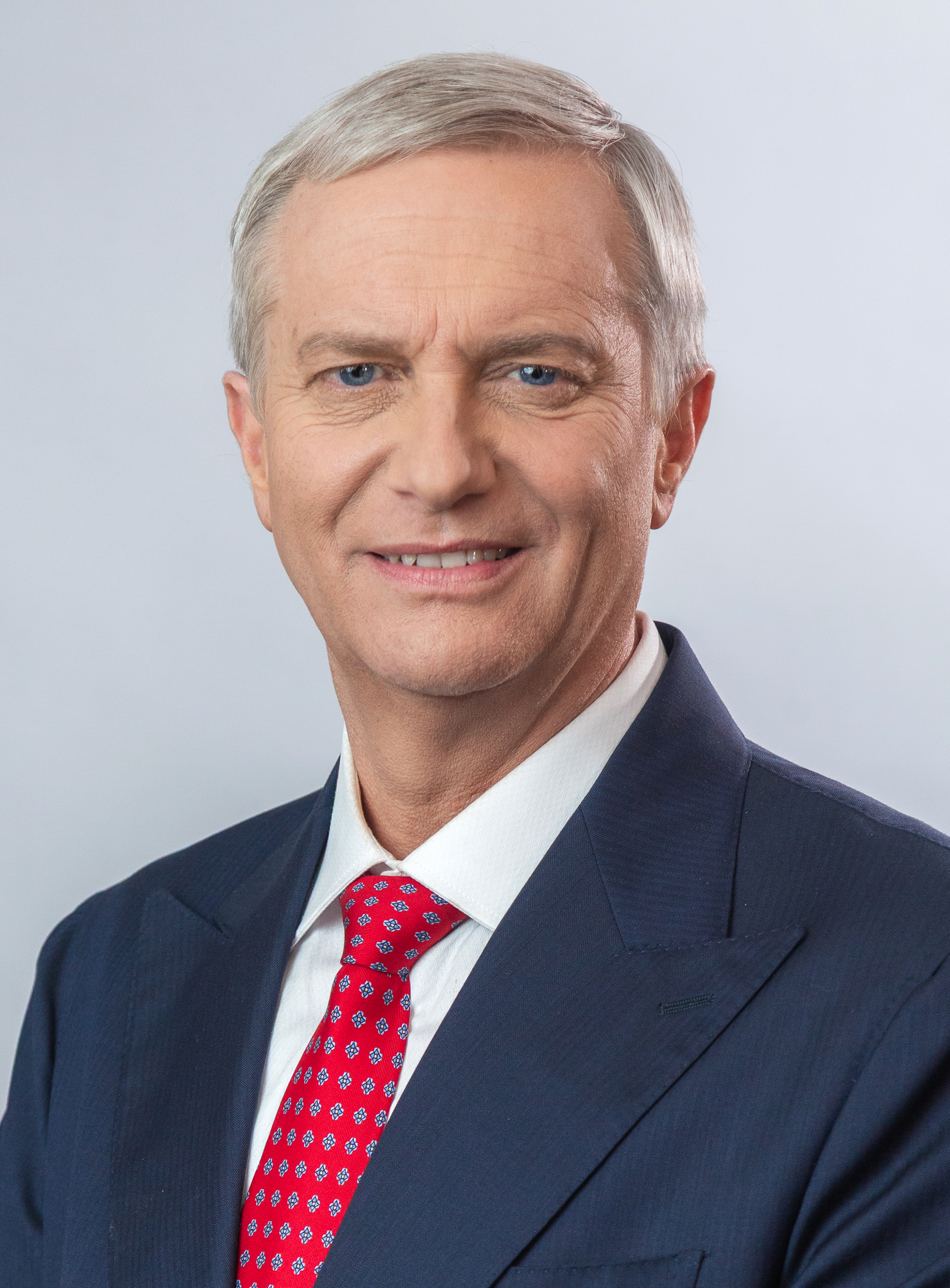

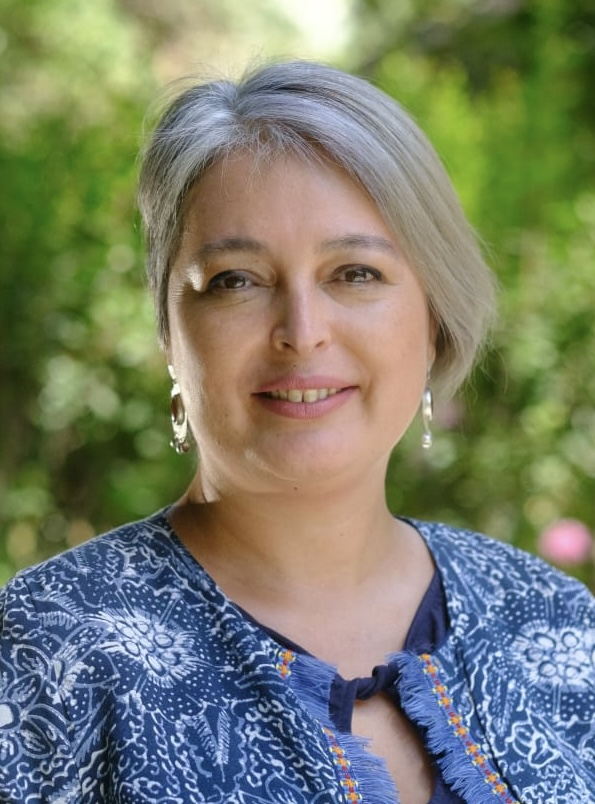
Candidate	José Antonio Kast	Jeannette Jara
Party	Republican	Communist
Alliance	Change for Chile	Unity for Chile
Popular vote	7,263,236	5,222,558
Percentage	58.17%	41.83%
President before election
Gabriel Boric
FA–UpCh
Elected President
José Antonio Kast
PRCh–CpCh
- Chamber of Deputies
- 16 November 2025
- All 155 seats in the Chamber of Deputies; 78 seats needed for a majority
Party	Vote %	Seats	+/–
UpCh	30.61	61	−13
CpCh	23.02	42	+27
ChGU	21.05	34	−19
PDG	11.99	14	+8
VRH	6.91	3	−1
Independents	0.69	1	0
This lists parties that won seats. See the complete results below.
- Senate
- 16 November 2025
- 23 of the 50 seats in the Senate; 26 seats needed for a majority
Party	Vote %	Seats	+/–
UpCh	32.20	20	+1
ChGU	24.27	17	−7
CpCh	25.40	8	+5
VRH	3.98	3	+1
This lists parties that won seats. See the complete results below.

General elections were held in Chile on 16 November 2025. Voters went to the polls to elect the 38th president of Chile, renew all 155 seats in the Chamber of Deputies, and fill 23 of the 50 seats in the Senate. Republican Party candidate José Antonio Kast defeated Communist Party member Jeannette Jara in a runoff election on 14 December.

In the first round, Jara, a member of the Communist Party of Chile, won a plurality of the vote. Kast, who has been described as conservative or hard-right, placed second. Combined, right-leaning candidates received approximately 70 percent of the first-round presidential vote. Johannes Kaiser and Evelyn Matthei, both candidates on the right, endorsed Kast for the runoff, while Franco Parisi declined to make an endorsement, calling on his voters to decide themselves who to vote for. In the runoff, Kast defeated Jara in a landslide victory with 58% of the vote, the second-highest percentage of the vote since Chile's transition to democracy. Kast received 7.2 million votes, which was the highest ever vote total in Chile's history. He won in all sixteen regions of the country.

In the parliamentary election, Unidad por Chile, a coalition of the ruling leftist and center-left parties, emerged as the largest bloc of the Chamber of Deputies, while in the Senate the left-wing and right-wing blocs reached a tie with 25 senators each.

This was the first general election since the reintroduction of compulsory voting in 2022.

== Background ==
The 2021 presidential election saw left-wing candidate Gabriel Boric, a former student protest leader during the 2011–2013 student protests, defeat conservative rival José Antonio Kast in a runoff. Boric's victory was attributed to widespread youth mobilization, dissatisfaction with the center-right administration of Sebastián Piñera, and economic strains following the COVID-19 pandemic. His platform emphasized social equity, feminist reforms, and a "dignified life" for marginalized groups, pledging to dismantle Chile's "patriarchal inheritance".

By mid-2023, Boric's approval ratings had plummeted to 28%, with 66% disapproving of his administration, according to polls. Analysts cited economic stagnation, legislative gridlock, and public safety concerns as primary factors. The right-wing Republican Party, led by Kast, capitalized on this discontent, securing a dominant victory in the May 2023 Constitutional Council elections, resulting in the failed 2023 Chilean constitutional referendum. Kast declared the results a mandate for "a major change in government", positioning himself as a frontrunner for 2025. Meanwhile, Evelyn Matthei of the Independent Democratic Union (UDI) also gained traction in opinion polls.

== Electoral system ==
This was the first presidential and congressional election since a constitutional amendment was passed and promulgated on 27 December 2022, restoring compulsory voting for all elections and plebiscites for the first time since 2012, except in primary elections. Eligible citizens who did not vote faced a fine of approximately 33,000 pesos (around US$35).

=== President ===
The President is elected using the two-round system; if no candidate receives over 50% of the vote to win outright in the first round, a second round will be held.

=== National Congress ===
- Chamber of Deputies: The 155 members are elected from 28 multi-member constituencies (3–8 seats each) using open-list proportional representation with the d'Hondt method.
- Senate: The 50 senators serve staggered eight-year terms. Half the chamber (25 seats) is renewed each general election, elected from 16 regional constituencies (2–5 seats each) under similar proportional rules.

== Presidential candidates ==
=== Registered ===
Seven of the following eight candidates were registered with the Electoral Service (Servel) and were accepted on 29 August 2025. Jeannette Jara, as a primary winner, was automatically registered as a candidate on 14 July 2025.

==== Advanced to runoff ====
Candidate	Endorsement	Ideology	Ref.	Remarks
Jeannette Jara; PCCh	Unity for Chile: PCCh; FA; PDC; PL; PPD; PR; PS; VRH: FREVS; Humanist Action; IEPAH: Equality Party; People's Party	Progressivism; Democratic socialism Communism		Jeannette Jara, former minister, won the Unity for Chile center-left coalition's presidential primary with 60% of the vote in nationwide elections held on 29 June 2025. Her candidacy was automatically registered with Servel when the Election Certification Tribunal declared her the winner on 14 July 2025. The Christian Democrats (DC), who were not part of the primary coalition, decided on 26 July to join the alliance, run on a unified parliamentary list, and support Jara's presidential bid. In addition to the DC, several non-official left-wing parties declared their support for Jara. However, two parties that participated in the primary—Social Green Regionalist Federation (FRVS) and Humanist Action (AH)—withdrew from the coalition on 16 August to register an independent parliamentary list named Verdes, Regionalistas y Humanistas, led by former Valparaíso mayor Jorge Sharp. While reiterating their support for Jara's presidential candidacy, FRVS and AH leaders stated that the move was intended to highlight their regionalist, environmental, and humanist agendas and to compete on equal terms in the legislative elections.
José Antonio Kast; PRCh	Change for Chile: PRCh; PSC	Right-wing populism National conservatism		José Antonio Kast, former deputy and founder of the Republican Party, was proclaimed as the party's presidential candidate on 9 January 2025, running directly in the November election without participating in any opposition primaries. He received additional backing from the Christian Social Party on 19 July 2025. Kast officially registered his candidacy with Servel on 18 August 2025, marking his third bid for the presidency. During his registration, he criticized what he described as a campaign of lies and defamation against him, emphasized the need for economic growth to improve pensions, and highlighted his proposals for public security, social order, and the welfare of animals.

==== Eliminated in first round ====
Candidate	Endorsement	Ideology	Ref.	Remarks
Eduardo Artés; Independent	PC (AP); Independent electors	Marxism–Leninism; Socialist patriotism Anti-Zionism; Multipolarity; Left-wing nationalism		Eduardo Artés, presidential candidate for the Communist Party (Proletarian Action), confirmed in December 2024 that he would make a third bid for the presidency, stating that his campaign seeks to reform Chile and end what he calls the country's "political duopoly". Because his party is not legally registered nationwide, he was required to gather over 35,000 signatures to qualify as an independent. Shortly before the registration deadline in August 2025, his campaign announced it had met this requirement, and he officially registered with Servel on 19 August 2025.
Marco Enríquez-Ominami; Independent	IEPAH: Humanist Party; Independent electors	Democratic socialism Progressivism		Marco Enríquez-Ominami, former deputy, confirmed on 3 August 2025 that he had collected 36,200 signatures—exceeding the 35,361 required—to run for president for a fifth time. In February, he had said he would consider another campaign, calling himself "a political animal" still "in the fight." He officially registered his candidacy with Servel on 18 August 2025 with over 37,000 independent sponsorships, declaring that he personally financed his nationwide tour and online campaign to gather the signatures.
Johannes Kaiser; PNL	Change for Chile: PNL	Social conservatism Paleolibertarianism; Pinochetism		Johannes Kaiser, deputy, was proclaimed as the presidential candidate for the National Libertarian Party (PNL) on 12 July 2025 during a ceremony at Espacio Riesco attended by around three thousand people, which included a controversial rendition of the Chilean National Anthem's third stanza. Kaiser officially registered his candidacy with Servel on 14 August 2025, presenting his government program and emphasizing that he has a "solid base to start the campaign" despite pressure to withdraw and unfavorable polling results.
Evelyn Matthei; UDI	Chile Grande y Unido: Chile Vamos: UDI; RN; Evópoli; Democrats; AxCh	Liberal conservatism Economic liberalism Conservative liberalism		Evelyn Matthei, former senator and minister, was endorsed as a presidential candidate by National Renewal on 11 January 2025, the UDI on 18 January, and Evópoli on 22 March, making her the nominee of the entire Chile Vamos coalition. Amarillos por Chile declared its support on 6 June. Matthei formally registered her candidacy with Servel on 16 August 2025, at which time Chile Vamos and Democrats presented their joint parliamentary pact, Great and United Chile. Before her official registration, Matthei held the status of pre-candidate—a term in Chile for those who announce their intention to run for office ahead of the formal registration period. This designation permits limited campaigning under Servel supervision, including the ability to receive donations and incur electoral expenses within regulated limits.
Harold Mayne-Nicholls; Independent	Independent electors			Harold Mayne-Nicholls, journalist and former president of the ANFP, confirmed on 16 August 2025 that he had collected the 35,361 signatures required to run for president. He officially registered his independent candidacy with Servel on 18 August 2025, presenting members of his team and emphasizing his campaign's focus on security, education, health, and housing. Mayne-Nicholls has framed his candidacy around dialogue, moderation, and his experience managing major projects such as the Santiago 2023 Pan American Games.
Franco Parisi; PDG	PDG	Populism; E-democracy		Franco Parisi, presidential candidate for the Party of the People (PDG), was officially proclaimed by his party on 6 May 2025 at the Santiago Congress headquarters, marking the start of his third presidential bid. He criticized both left- and right-wing parties for prioritizing their own interests over the middle class and expressed his goal of reaching a second-round runoff while winning parliamentary seats for his party. Parisi officially registered his candidacy with Servel on 18 August 2025, asserting that "the polls are lying" and highlighting the influence of his parliamentary candidates, including deputy Pamela Jiles.

=== Withdrawn ===
- Félix González (Green Ecologist Party), deputy for District 20 in the Biobío Region, announced his presidential bid on 6 January 2025, saying, "we have decided to collect the signatures to register an ecologist candidacy, because environmental issues are absent from the public agenda." He emphasized urgent social and climate security, adding, "we have the obligation to raise pensions... and face fires, floods, and droughts." González ultimately did not register and did not appear on the November 2025 ballot.
- Vlado Mirosevic (Liberal Party, PL), deputy for District 1 in the Arica and Parinacota Region, was proclaimed his party's presidential candidate on 12 October 2024 and planned to run in the center-left primaries. But with the Liberal Party lacking national status, it needed 35,361 signatures to validate his candidacy; by 31 March, it had only 9,851 members. Mirosevic withdrew on 16 April 2025 and endorsed Carolina Tohá. He denied the signature shortfall was the reason, arguing that multiple candidates from the PS, PPD, and PL risked handing victory to the Communist Party, and called Tohá the most competitive option.
- Francesca Muñoz (Christian Social Party, PSC), deputy for District 20 in the Biobío Region, was proclaimed her party's presidential candidate on 29 April 2025, following the resignation of Senator Rojo Edwards and amid a new alliance with the Republican and National Libertarian parties. But on 30 June, she ended her bid and endorsed José Antonio Kast, calling the moment one that "demands brave, generous, and responsible decisions," and urging her supporters to back his candidacy.
- Ximena Rincón (Demócratas), senator for the Maule Region, was proclaimed as the party's presidential candidate on 15 March 2025. The party indicated it would explore the possibility of joining a primary with other political forces, emphasizing a centrist path "far from the extremes" and aiming for broader parliamentary representation. Rincón framed her prospective campaign around dialogue and moderation, asserting that Chile could "once again be admired and respected around the world." However, she ultimately did not register her candidacy with Servel and therefore did not appear on the ballot for the November 2025 election.
- Marcelo Trivelli (independent, ex-DC), former intendant of the Santiago Metropolitan Region, ended his presidential bid on 31 July 2025 after failing to gather the 36,000 signatures required to run as an independent. He acknowledged the lack of both citizen support and backing from the Christian Democratic Party, which instead endorsed Jeannette Jara. Trivelli criticized the DC for "abandoning its historic convictions" and stated he would continue working on initiatives promoting social cohesion.
- Alberto Undurraga (Christian Democratic Party, DC), deputy for District 8 and party president, formally withdrew his presidential candidacy on 10 May 2025 during a National Council meeting, following mounting internal criticism and isolation from broader center-left alliances. Though previously proclaimed by the party to run in primaries, the DC's Supreme Tribunal annulled the mandate after no pact was reached and the primary deadline passed. Amid growing dissent and key figures like Ignacio Walker and Genaro Arriagada endorsing Carolina Tohá, Undurraga acknowledged that internal conditions were not conducive to a viable candidacy. He cited the need to avoid damaging the party and pledged to focus on parliamentary negotiations and promoting the DC's programmatic agenda.
- Paulina Vodanovic (Socialist Party, PS), senator for the Maule Region and PS president, withdrew her presidential candidacy on 28 April 2025, just two weeks after being unanimously proclaimed by the party's central committee. She cited the lack of support from other parties and the need to back a unified candidacy within the center-left, which consolidated around Carolina Tohá. Vodanovic stated that continuing her campaign would have required political conditions that did not materialize and emphasized the importance of unity against the right.

=== Declined ===
- Michelle Bachelet (Socialist Party), former president of Chile (2006–2010, 2014–2018), announced on 5 March 2025 that she would not run for a third term, stating that "good politics demands renewal." Her decision ended months of speculation within the ruling coalition. In a statement from her foundation Horizonte Ciudadano, she said others in her sector were "valuable and capable", and pledged to support whoever is ultimately chosen to represent the center-left in the November election.
- Rodolfo Carter (UDI–Chile Vamos), former mayor of La Florida
- Rojo Edwards (Christian Social Party, PSC), senator for Santiago, was briefly considered a potential presidential candidate by the PSC. In an initial internal vote, he was selected without unanimous support from the party's parliamentary members. However, at a second meeting, Edwards rejected the political guidelines set by the PSC for its presidential nominee. On 23 April 2025, the party's national leadership revoked his candidacy, citing the need for a candidate aligned with its political project. On 28 April 2025, he resigned from the party.
- Daniel Jadue (Communist Party), former mayor of Recoleta, declined to pursue a presidential bid after his party proclaimed Labor Minister Jeannette Jara as its candidate on 5 April 2025. Jadue, under house arrest in connection with the "People's Pharmacies" case, had previously expressed interest in returning to the race. Communist Party president Lautaro Carmona announced that Jadue would instead run for deputy in the 9th district, replacing Karol Cariola, who is seeking a Senate seat in Valparaíso. However, that deputy candidacy did not materialize either because the Election Certification Tribunal (Tricel) excluded Jadue from the electoral register and barred him from appearing on the ballot, effectively preventing him from running for deputy.
- Rodrigo Mundaca (ind.), Governor of the Valparaíso Region (2021-)
- Claudio Orrego (independent, ex-DC), re-elected governor of the Santiago Metropolitan Region on 24 November 2024, declined to pursue a presidential candidacy despite speculation following his electoral victory. In a press conference after meeting President Gabriel Boric at La Moneda, Orrego ruled out a presidential run, stating, "My only plan is to be governor for the next four years," and said, "We'll have to look for other leaderships."
- Gaspar Rivas, member of the Chamber of Deputies of Chile
- Beatriz Sánchez (independent, pro-Frente Amplio), journalist and former presidential candidate
- Camila Vallejo (Communist Party of Chile–Chile Digno), Minister General Secretariat of Government
- Tomás Vodanovic (Frente Amplio), Mayor of Maipú.

=== Speculated ===
- Ignacio Briones (Evópoli), former Minister of Finance (2018–2021)
- Eduardo Frei Ruiz-Tagle (Christian Democratic Party), former President of Chile (1994–2000)
- José Antonio Gómez (Radical Party), Minister of Defence (2014–2018)

== Parliamentary candidates ==
On 1 September 2025, all candidates for the Chamber of Deputies and the Senate were announced; 1,091 candidates for the Chamber of Deputies and 130 for the Senate:

- Change for Chile: Coalition of right-wing parties formed by the Republican Party, the Social Christian Party (PSC), and the National Libertarian Party (PNL).
- Unidad por Chile: Coalition of the ruling center-left and left-wing parties: Frente Amplio (FA); the Communist Party (PC); the Socialist Party (PS); the Party for Democracy (PPD); the Radical Party (PR); the Liberal Party (PL); and the Christian Democrats (DC), the latter of which is not part of Boric's government.
- Chile Grande y Unido: right-wing coalition of the traditional right-wing Chilean parties composed of National Renewal (RN); the Independent Democratic Union (UDI); Political Evolution (Evópoli), and Democrats.
- Greens, Regionalists and Humanists: coalition formed by the Regionalist Green Social Federation (FRVS) and Humanist Action (AH).
- Popular Ecologist, Animalist, and Humanist Left: coalition formed by the Humanist Party (PH) and the Equality Party (PI).

== Campaign ==
=== First round ===
The campaign for the general election officially began on 17 September 2025 and with eight presidential candidates, the main contest was between Jeannette Jara and José Antonio Kast.

A polarising election, the campaign's main concerns were rising gang violence and migration from Venezuela, rather than traditional economic or social issues.

Among Kast's campaign pledges were cuts to public spending and the creation of a police force against illegal migration inspired by the United States Immigration and Customs Enforcement. Analysts also expected the results could pave way for more market friendly initiatives as Kast was favored to win.

In general terms, right-wing and far-right parties proposed fiscal austerity measures, promotion of private investment, reduction of the state and tough security policies such as militarization, mass deportations and police defense. Jara, for her part, advocated for greater state intervention, expansion of social benefits such as basic income, regulation of prices for essential services, strengthening gun control, and temporary biometric registration for immigrants.

=== Second round ===
The campaign for the second round began on 17 November. Jeannette Jara started it with an event involving women in the La Pintana neighborhood of Santiago while José Antonio Kast started his campaign in the city of Temuco.

Insecurity was once again the key issue of the campaign, with Jara declaring that she would strengthen the police force, lift banking secrecy in order to track down money linked to drug trafficking, and reclaim neighborhoods from criminal gangs. For his part, Kast, speaking from Temuco, the capital of a region militarized since 2022 due to violence from criminal gangs, promised to deport migrants and erect a "border shield".

The main televised debate between the two candidates took place on the evening of 9 December and was organized by the National Television Association (Anatel), which, according to Anatel, was watched by over seven million people.

Throughout his campaign, Kast used bulletproof glass at his rallies, a fact that was criticized by Jara.

== Endorsements ==
Endorsements from first-round candidates
First-round candidate	First round	Endorsement
Franco Parisi	19.71%	No endorsement
Johannes Kaiser	13.94%	José Antonio Kast
Evelyn Matthei	12.46%	José Antonio Kast
Harold Mayne-Nicholls	1.26%	No endorsement
Marco Enríquez-Ominami	1.20%	No endorsement
Eduardo Artés	0.66%	No endorsement

Endorsements from political parties and movements
All.	Party	Ideology	Endorsement
CpCh	National Libertarian Party	Right-libertarianism	José Antonio Kast
ChGyU	Independent Democratic Union	Conservatism	José Antonio Kast
ChGyU	National Renewal	Liberal conservatism	José Antonio Kast
ChGyU	Evópoli	Classical liberalism	José Antonio Kast
ChGyU	Democrats (dissolving)	Christian democracy	José Antonio Kast
—N/a	Liberty Party (in formation)	Right-libertarianism	José Antonio Kast
—N/a	Party of the People	Populism	No endorsement
—N/a	Amarillos por Chile (dissolving)	Centrism	José Antonio Kast

José Antonio Kast

Former officials

- Eduardo Frei Ruiz-Tagle, former President of Chile
- Jaime Campos, former Minister of Agriculture and Justice (Radical)
- Carlos Maldonado Curti, former Minister of Justice (Democrats)
- Sebastián Sichel, former Minister of Social Development and presidential candidate in 2021
- Jaime Ravinet, former Minister of Defence.
- Ricardo Navarrete, former ambassador of Chile in Colombia.
- Sergio Jiménez Moraga, former Minister of Mining.
- Ricardo Yáñez, former general director of Chilean Carabineros

Local officials

- Helmuth Martínez, mayor of Carahue

Governors

- Diego Paco Mamani, governor of Arica.
- Cristóbal Juliá, governor of Coquimbo.
- Sergio Giacaman, governor of Biobío.
- Pedro Álvarez-Salamanca Ramírez, governor of Maule.
- Alejandro Santana Tirachini, governor of Los Lagos.
- Marcelo Santana Vargas, governor of Aysén.

Individuals

- Javier Olivares, journalist and elected Member of the Chamber of Deputies of Chile.
- Cecilia Morel, former first lady of Chile (2010–2014; 2018–2022)
- Marcelo Ríos, tennis player

International politicians

- Javier Milei, president of Argentina (2023–present)
- Santiago Abascal, Member of the Spanish Congress of Deputies and president of VOX

Organizations

- New York Young Republican Club
Jeannette Jara

Former officials

- Michelle Bachelet, former United Nations High Commissioner for Human Rights and former President of Chile
- Mario Marcel, former Minister of Finance

National officials

- Gonzalo Winter, Member of the Chamber of Deputies

Local officials

- Macarena Ripamonti, mayor of Viña del Mar
- Tomás Vodanovic, mayor of Maipú
- Jorge Sharp, former mayor of Valparaíso
- Fuad Chahín, former Regional Counseller of the Government for the Araucanía Region

Governors

- René Saffirio, governor of La Araucanía

Individuals

- Antonino Parisi, brother of the former presidential candidate, Franco Parisi
- Luisa Durán, former first lady of Chile (2000–2006)
- Diamela Eltit, Chilean writer
- Elicura Chihuailaf, Chilean poet
- Elvira Hernandez, Chilean poet and literary critic
- José Bengoa, Chilean historian
- Manuel Silva Acevedo, Chilean poet
- Patricio Guzmán, Chilean documentary film director
- Raúl Zurita, Chilean writer
- Rosabetty Muñoz, Chilean poet
- Alia Trabuco Zerán, Chilean writer
- Alejandra Costamagna, Chilean writer and journalist
- Miguel Littin, Chilean film director
- Alejandro Zambra, Chilean poet
- Alfredo Castro, Chilean actor
- Amparo Noguera, Chilean actress
- Ana María del Río, Chilean poet
- Carmen Castillo, French-Chilean filmmaker
- Álvaro Henríquez, Chilean singer-songwriter, vocalist of Los Tres
- Daniel Rojas Pachas, Chilean novelist
- Daniela Ramírez, Chilean actress
- Francisco Reyes Morandé, Chilean actor
- Mon Laferte, Chilean singer

Labor unions

- National Association of Public Employees

== Opinion polls ==
Opinion polls for the first round of the 2025 Chilean presidential election. Each point represents a poll. Each line is a local regression that represents one of the officially registered candidates.
Opinion polls for the second round of the 2025 Chilean presidential election. Each point represents a poll. Each line is a local regression that represents the two candidates.

== Results ==
=== President ===
Jara emerged as the leading candidate in the first round with 27% of the vote, followed closely by José Antonio Kast with 24%. However, no candidate obtained the required majority to win the presidency outright. As a result, the election proceeded to a runoff between Jeannette Jara and José Antonio Kast on 14 December 2025. Third place went to Franco Parisi, who obtained 20% of the vote, a surprising result given he had been polling at under 10%. Kaiser received 14% of the vote, and fifth place went to Evelyn Matthei, who received 12% of the vote, a significant defeat as she was expected to come third and had led the polls for several months at one point in the campaign. The other candidates received less than 5% of the votes.

In his third attempt to become president of Chile, Kast won the second round with 58% of the vote, marking the most significant shift to the right since the end of the Pinochet dictatorship. He received the second-highest percentage of the vote since Chile's transition to democracy. Kast received 7.2 million votes, the highest ever vote total in Chile's history. He won all regions of the country, with Jara only winning the overseas vote.

Candidate	Party	First round		Second round	
Candidate	Party	Votes	%	Votes	%
Jeannette Jara	Communist Party (UpCh)	3,483,490	26.85	5,222,558	41.83
José Antonio Kast	Republican Party (CpCh)	3,104,458	23.93	7,263,236	58.17
Franco Parisi	Party of the People	2,557,737	19.71		
Johannes Kaiser	National Libertarian Party (CpCh)	1,808,434	13.94		
Evelyn Matthei	Independent Democratic Union (ChGU)	1,617,720	12.47		
Harold Mayne-Nicholls	Independent	163,105	1.26		
Marco Enríquez-Ominami	Independent	154,698	1.19		
Eduardo Artés	Independent (PC-AP)	85,392	0.66		
Total		12,975,034	100.00	12,485,794	100.00
Valid votes		12,975,034	96.27	12,485,794	92.94
Invalid votes		361,403	2.68	783,816	5.83
Blank votes		141,989	1.05	165,344	1.23
Total votes		13,478,426	100.00	13,434,954	100.00
Registered voters/turnout		15,779,102	85.42	15,779,102	85.14
Source: Tricel (first round; second round)

=== Chamber of Deputies ===
In the Chamber of Deputies, Unidad por Chile emerged as the largest bloc with 61 seats, followed by Cambio por Chile with 42 seats. Smaller coalitions and parties, including Chile Grande y Unido and the Party of the People, also secured representation.

Party or alliance		Votes	%	Seats	+/–
Unidad por Chile	Frente Amplio	807,731	7.54	17	–6
Unidad por Chile	Socialist Party	586,348	5.47	11	–2
Unidad por Chile	Communist Party	538,793	5.03	11	–1
Unidad por Chile	Christian Democratic Party	454,544	4.24	8	0
Unidad por Chile	Party for Democracy	430,524	4.02	9	+2
Unidad por Chile	Liberal Party	237,343	2.21	3	–
Unidad por Chile	Radical Party	225,361	2.10	2	–2
Unidad por Chile	Total	3,280,644	30.61	61	–10
Change for Chile	Republican Party	1,424,832	13.29	31	+17
Change for Chile	National Libertarian Party	679,500	6.34	8	New
Change for Chile	Christian Social Party	362,888	3.39	3	+2
Change for Chile	Total	2,467,220	23.02	42	+27
Chile Grande y Unido	Independent Democratic Union	895,233	8.35	18	–5
Chile Grande y Unido	National Renewal	868,240	8.10	13	–12
Chile Grande y Unido	Evópoli	280,261	2.61	2	–2
Chile Grande y Unido	Democrats	212,930	1.99	1	New
Chile Grande y Unido	Total	2,256,664	21.05	34	–16
Party of the People		1,285,464	11.99	14	+8
Greens, Regionalists and Humanists	Social Green Regionalist Federation	458,537	4.28	2	0
Greens, Regionalists and Humanists	Humanist Action	282,468	2.64	1	New
Greens, Regionalists and Humanists	Total	741,005	6.91	3	+1
Popular Ecologist Left	Humanist Party	199,680	1.86	0	–3
Popular Ecologist Left	Equality Party	79,871	0.75	0	0
Popular Ecologist Left	Total	279,551	2.61	0	–3
Green Ecologist Party		88,431	0.83	0	–2
Amarillos por Chile		87,744	0.82	0	New
Popular Green Alliance Party		69,410	0.65	0	New
Revolutionary Workers Party		65,058	0.61	0	0
People's Party		23,365	0.22	0	New
Independents		73,475	0.69	1	–1
Total		10,718,031	100.00	155	0
Valid votes		10,718,031	79.97		
Invalid votes		1,723,163	12.86		
Blank votes		961,988	7.18		
Total votes		13,403,182	100.00		
Registered voters/turnout		15,618,167	85.82		
Source: Servel

=== Senate ===
In the Senate, 23 seats were renewed. The election maintained the overall ideological balance seen in 2021, with right-leaning and left-leaning parties each controlling 25 seats when counting independents. The main changes were internal to each bloc: Unidad por Chile unified the former center-left and left coalitions without altering their combined seat total, while the right experienced a shift in influence as the Republican Party expanded and the Independent Democratic Union declined.

Party or alliance		Votes	%	Seats		
Party or alliance		Votes	%	Won	Not up	Total
Unidad por Chile	Communist Party	258,229	8.34	1	2	3
Unidad por Chile	Socialist Party	222,833	7.19	3	4	7
Unidad por Chile	Frente Amplio	155,053	5.00	2	0	2
Unidad por Chile	Party for Democracy	147,244	4.75	2	2	4
Unidad por Chile	Christian Democratic Party	93,550	3.02	2	1	3
Unidad por Chile	Liberal Party	75,036	2.42	1	0	1
Unidad por Chile	Radical Party	45,485	1.47	0	0	0
Unidad por Chile	Total	997,530	32.20	11	9	20
Change for Chile	Republican Party	534,981	17.27	5	0	5
Change for Chile	National Libertarian Party	171,602	5.54	1	0	1
Change for Chile	Christian Social Party	80,426	2.60	0	2	2
Change for Chile	Total	787,009	25.40	6	2	8
Chile Grande y Unido	National Renewal	431,539	13.93	4	4	8
Chile Grande y Unido	Independent Democratic Union	231,239	7.46	0	5	5
Chile Grande y Unido	Democrats	77,986	2.52	1	1	2
Chile Grande y Unido	Political Evolution	11,253	0.36	0	2	2
Chile Grande y Unido	Total	752,017	24.27	5	12	17
Party of the People		325,676	10.51	0	0	0
Greens, Regionalists and Humanists	Social Green Regionalist Federation	80,295	2.59	1	2	3
Greens, Regionalists and Humanists	Humanist Action	42,923	1.39	0	0	0
Greens, Regionalists and Humanists	Total	123,218	3.98	1	2	3
Green Ecologist Party		21,326	0.69	0	0	0
Popular Ecologist Left	Humanist Party	9,753	0.31	0	0	0
Popular Ecologist Left	Equality Party	4,795	0.15	0	0	0
Popular Ecologist Left	Total	14,548	0.47	0	0	0
Popular Green Alliance Party		9,738	0.31	0	0	0
People's Party		2,093	0.07	0	0	0
Independents		65,019	2.10	0	2	2
Total		3,098,074	100.00	23	27	50
Valid votes		3,098,074	82.69			
Invalid votes		403,900	10.78			
Blank votes		244,629	6.53			
Total votes		3,746,603	100.00			
Registered voters/turnout		4,378,940	85.56			
Source: Servel

== Reactions and aftermath ==
=== First round ===
Matthei was the first to make a statement after the results were announced, accepting defeat and pledging her support for Kast in the second round. Kaiser also called for people to vote for Kast in the second round. President Boric congratulated the winners and called for "a debate with high standards."

=== Second round ===
In keeping with tradition, outgoing President Gabriel Boric congratulated President-elect Kast on his victory during a televised phone call. Kast thanked him for his congratulations and expressed his desire for a "very orderly and respectful" transition, also hoping to hear Boric's views on the country once he assumed the presidency on 11 March 2026.

In his first speech as president-elect, Kast stated that "it wasn't one person who won here, Chile won," and when some members of the audience booed Jara's name, he demanded respect and silence, adding that "she took on a very difficult challenge and gave it her all in her own style until the end, and that, at least for me, is something I value."

Jara personally congratulated Kast after his victory. In her following public statement, Jara acknowledged defeat and expressed her support for the president-elect "in everything that is good for Chile." Kast received a visit from Jara that night at campaign headquarters.

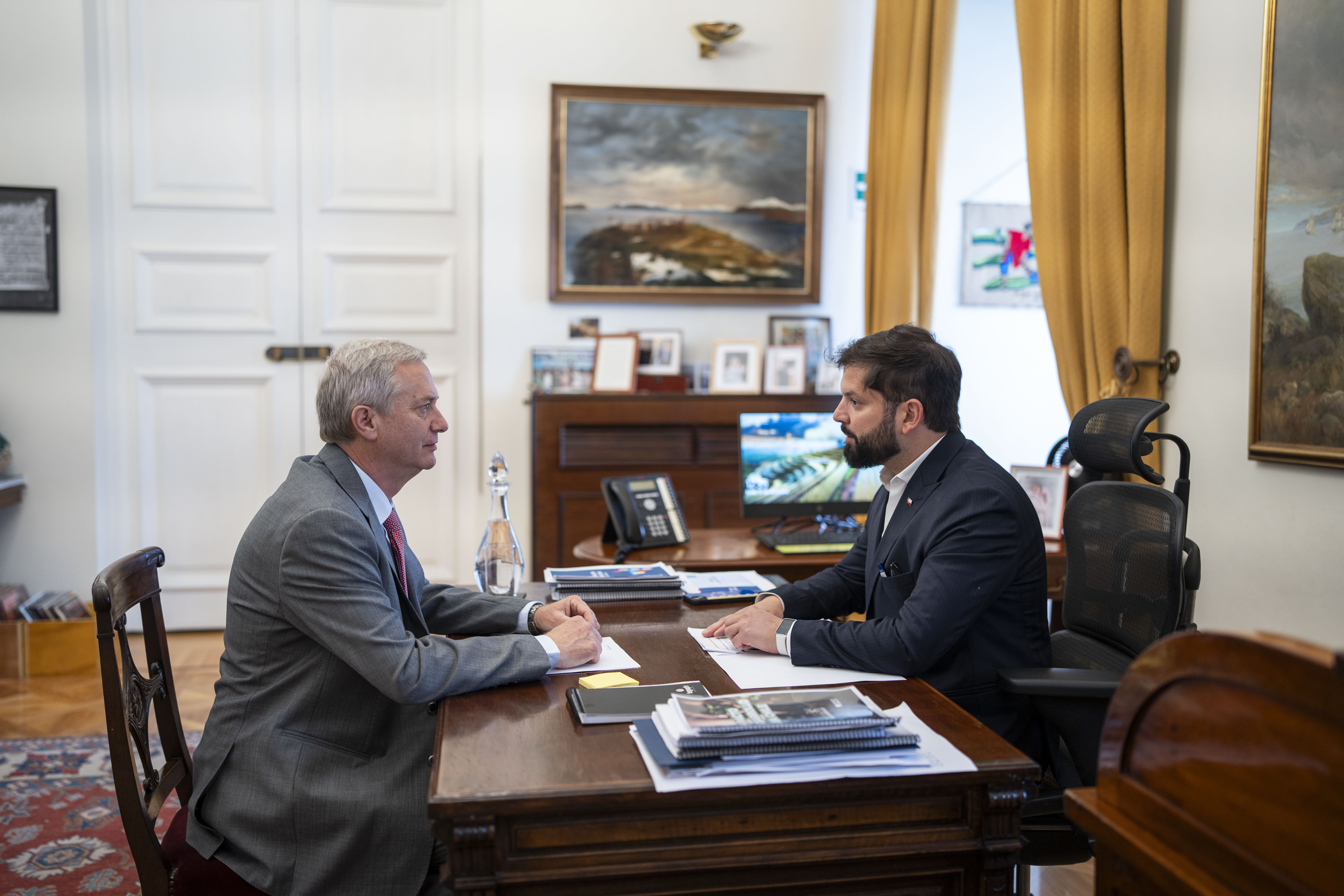
President Boric with president-elect José Antonio Kast in Palacio de la Moneda, 15 December 2025

Kast was congratulated by several international leaders, including Argentine President Javier Milei, Paraguayan President Santiago Peña, Ecuadorian President Daniel Noboa, Bolivian President Rodrigo Paz, Costa Rican President Rodrigo Chaves, Brazilian President Lula da Silva, Mexican President Claudia Sheinbaum as well as U.S. Secretary of State Marco Rubio, former Colombian President Iván Duque and former Ecuadorian President Guillermo Lasso. He was also congratuled by Spanish politician and leader of the Vox party Santiago Abascal, Spanish Prime Minister Pedro Sánchez and by Alberto Núñez Feijóo.

Colombian President Gustavo Petro criticized Kast's election harshly, stating "Fascism is advancing. I will never shake hands with a Nazi, nor with the son of a Nazi; (Note: A reference to Kast's father, Michael Kast, who was a member of the Nazi Party.) they are death incarnate. It's sad that Pinochet had to impose himself by force, but it's even sadder now that people are choosing their own Pinochet." Boric's outgoing government responded to Petro's statements, rejecting them and deciding to file a formal protest.

The Mapuche Political Platform issued a statement stating that the electoral results "not only signify an electoral defeat for the country's progressive and indigenous forces but also a cultural defeat".

The following day, on 15 December, President Boric and Kast held a meeting at the Palacio de la Moneda to prepare for the transfer of power.

=== Parliamentary election ===
After failing to reach the minimum legal threshold of votes, at least 13 political parties were expected to dissolve, including the longstanding Radical Party. The order to do so was given by the Servel on 12 February 2026.
