= Alberto Cooper =

Chilean politician (1928–2023)

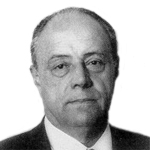

Member of the Senate of Chile
- In office 11 March 1990 – 11 March 1998
- Preceded by: District created
- Succeeded by: Evelyn Matthei
- Constituency: 4th Circumscription

Intendant of the Coquimbo Region
- In office December 1988 – 7 September 1989
- Appointed by: Augusto Pinochet
- Preceded by: Hernán Reyes
- Succeeded by: Juan de Dios Peralta

Personal details
- Born: 20 July 1928 Antofagasta, Chile
- Died: 23 November 2023 (aged 95) Santiago, Chile
- Party: Renovación Nacional
- Spouse: Ximena Weissman
- Children: Four
- Parent(s): Francisco Cooper; Lola Valencia
- Education: Pontifical Catholic University of Chile (B.Sc); University of Chile (M.Sc)
- Occupation: Politician
- Profession: Agronomist

Alberto Cooper Valencia (20 July 1928 – 28 September 2023) was a Chilean politician who served as a senator.

== Biography ==
He was born in Antofagasta on 20 August 1928. He was the son of Francisco Galvarino Cooper and Lola Valencia. In 1956, he married Ximena Weismann Ríos, with whom he had four children: Alberto, Ximena, Ana María, and Fernando. He died in La Serena on 28 September 2023.

=== Professional career ===
He completed his secondary education at Colegio San Luis of Antofagasta. He later entered the School of Agronomy of the Pontifical Catholic University of Chile, where he obtained the degree of Agricultural Engineer in 1953. His graduation thesis was entitled “Pests and Diseases of Potatoes in La Serena”.

In 1971, he undertook postgraduate studies in Agrochemistry at the University of Chile. He also participated in seminars and conferences related to agriculture and economics.

In his professional practice, he devoted himself to agricultural activities in La Serena, operating the Peñuelas estate, and later the Bella Vista estate in the Elqui Valley, which he dedicated to the cultivation of potatoes and cereals, dairy production, and livestock farming. He pursued an academic career as a university lecturer in Crop Science ―Fitotecnia― and Plant Health at the University of Chile, La Serena campus.

Between 1974 and 1975, he served as director of the National Company of Measuring Instruments (ENAPRI). Between 1985 and 1986, he was president of the Coquimbo Electric Company, and between 1987 and 1988, he served as vice-president of the Atacama Manganese Company.

He also served as director of the Northern Agricultural and Dairy Cooperative, as well as of the CAPEL and Limarí Pisco Cooperatives.

== Political career ==
His public service career began in 1960, when he worked until 1970 as an agricultural health engineer for the Agricultural and Livestock Service (SAG). He later served as regional director of the SAG for the Atacama and Coquimbo regions. From 1964 to 1968, he served on the Special Expropriations Court and the Property Valuation Appeals Court.

In 1973, he was appointed regional director of the Production Development Corporation for the Fourth Region. On 7 March 1975, he was appointed by General Augusto Pinochet as Regional Ministerial Secretary ―Seremi― of Economy, a position he held until 2 May 1988.

Following the victory of the “No” option in the 1988 Chilean national plebiscite, he was appointed Intendant of the Coquimbo Region in December 1988, a position he held until September 1989.

In the 1989 parliamentary elections, he ran for the Senate of Chile as an independent candidate within the Democracy and Progress pact for the Fourth Senatorial District, Coquimbo Region, for the 1990–1998 term. He was elected with 46,490 votes (19.39% of valid votes).

After assuming office as Senator, on 13 March 1990, he joined Renovación Nacional. In a 2011 interview, he stated that he never considered returning to Congress after completing his term, expressing his intention to retire from political life.
