= Franco Parisi =

Chilean economist and politician

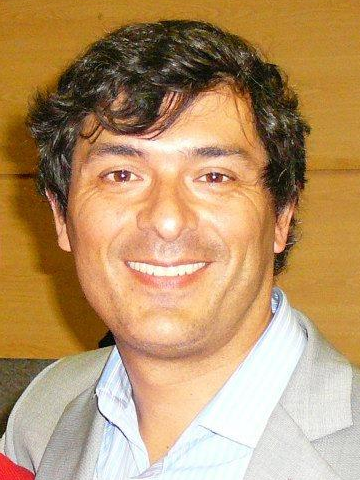
- Parisi in 2013

Personal details
- Born: 25 August 1967 (age 59) Santiago, Chile
- Party: Party of the People (since 2019)
- Other political affiliations: Independent (2013); Unidos en la Fe (2017)
- Spouse(s): Laura Lee Campbell (m. 1996; div. 2009) Denise Tarziján
- Children: 4
- Parent(s): Zandra Fernández Ledesma; Antonino Parisi Sepúlveda
- Education: Instituto Nacional; University of Chile (BA); University of Georgia (PhD)
- Occupation: Economist, politician
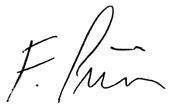
- Signature
- Website: parisi2014.cl

Franco Aldo Parisi Fernández (born 25 August 1967) is a Chilean economist and politician. He rose to prominence through his radio and television programs, where he broke down complex economic concepts into everyday language, earning him the nickname "the people's economist." He is a founder and the current leader of the Party of the People (PDG). Parisi has been a presidential candidate in the 2013, 2021, and 2025 elections. both the 2021 and 2025 first rounds, he finished in third place; in 2025, he secured 19.71 percent of the vote. Ideologically, Parisi identifies as a social liberal.

== Early life and education ==
Parisi was born in Santiago on 25 August 1967. He attended the Escuela Experimental Salvador Sanfuentes and completed his secondary education at the prestigious Instituto Nacional. He also spent a brief period at the Chilean Military Academy. Parisi earned a degree in business administration from the University of Chile and later obtained a PhD in the same field from the University of Georgia in the United States.

== Academic career ==
Parisi held visiting professorships at several American universities, including Rice University (2002–03), the University of Alabama (2000), the University of Georgia (1999), and Georgetown University. His tenure at Texas Tech University and the University of Alabama ended following allegations of sexual harassment from students, though no criminal charges were ever filed.

In Chile, he was a professor at the Faculty of Economics and Business of the University of Chile, where he also served as vice dean and interim dean in 2010. He was a member of the university's Monetary Policy Group (Grupo de Política Monetaria). He ran for dean but lost the election to Manuel Agosín.

He also worked at the Andrés Bello National University, where he was appointed dean of the Business Faculty, and later became the dean of the Chilean Institute for Executive Development (IEDE), both institutions owned by Laureate International Universities. He resigned from this position in July 2012.

== Media career and public profile ==
In the 1990s, Parisi worked as a junior, part-time government advisor on various issues. His public profile soared in 2011 during a controversy with the retailer La Polar. His frequent media appearances and his knack for explaining economic phenomena in colloquial terms became his trademark.

In mid-2011, he and his brother Antonino Parisi launched a TV show called Los Parisi: el poder de la gente (The Parisis: The Power of the People). The program first aired on Vía X and later moved to La Red. In March 2012, he acted as an advisor to leaders of the 2012 Aysén protests.

== Political career ==
=== 2013 presidential candidacy ===
Parisi announced his independent presidential pre-candidacy on 30 January 2012, challenging fellow independent Marco Enríquez-Ominami to a primary, an offer which was declined.

By June 2013, he had gathered over fifty thousand signatures to register his candidacy with the Electoral Service of Chile, which he did on 7 August 2013. In the election, he finished fourth out of nine candidates with 10.11% of the vote.

=== 2017 candidacies ===
In 2015, Parisi hinted at another independent presidential run for the 2017 election, formally launching his campaign in April 2017 with the support of several minor movements. However, he withdrew his presidential bid in August 2017 to run for the Senate, a candidacy that also fell through due to legal technicalities with his supporting party.

=== Party of the People and 2021 presidential candidacy ===
Amid the social unrest in late 2019, Parisi began to lead in some opinion polls for the 2021 presidential election.

He was a founding figure of the Party of the People (PDG), which grew out of his "El Poder de la Gente" movement. The party was officially recognized in July 2021. As the PDG's candidate in the 2021 presidential election, Parisi finished third in the first round with 12.80% of the vote, winning the largest share of votes in the Antofagasta Region. Following an internal PDG consultation, he endorsed José Antonio Kast in the runoff.

=== 2025 presidential candidacy ===
Parisi was the Party of the People's presidential candidate in the 2025 Chilean presidential election, where he finished in third place with 19.71% of the vote.

== Controversies ==
=== Pension debts ===
During the 2013 campaign, rival candidate Evelyn Matthei accused Parisi of owing hundreds of millions of pesos in unpaid pensions to workers at schools he had represented. Parisi denied the allegations and filed a lawsuit against Matthei, which was later dismissed by the courts. In 2017, the Supreme Court annulled the process against him.

=== Electoral irregularities ===
Following the 2013 election, press investigations alleged irregularities in the signature collection process for his candidacy, including cases of forged signatures. The notary who authorized his signatures was later indicted and removed from office.

In 2014, the Electoral Service rejected his campaign expense report due to questionable items, including purchases of Hugo Boss brand clothing and a large payment to a relative.

=== Sexual harassment allegation ===
In 2016, an anonymous complaint of sexual harassment was filed against Parisi by a student at Texas Tech University, where he was a visiting professor. The allegations led to his dismissal from Texas Tech and the University of Alabama, though no criminal charges were ever filed, and Parisi denied the accusations.

=== Child support debt and arrest warrant ===
In September 2021, it was revealed that Parisi had an outstanding arrest warrant (orden de arraigo) due to a child support debt of approximately CLP 207 million (roughly USD 250,000) owed to his two children from his first marriage. The case drew sharp criticism, with Chile's Minister for Women and Gender Equity calling it "unacceptable" and a women's rights advocate labeling it "economic gender-based violence."

Parisi's legal attempts to have the case annulled were rejected by the courts. He subsequently claimed to have requested political asylum in the United States, alleging political persecution in Chile, though he provided no evidence for this claim. In December 2022, a court agreement was reached where Parisi recognized the debt and renounced parental authority, paving the way for the arrest warrant to be lifted and allowing his return to Chile in 2023 for campaigning.

=== Campaign finance irregularities ===
Following the 2021 elections, the Party of the People faced allegations of financing its campaigns through contributions that circumvented the legal regime of the Electoral Service. Further reports highlighted that panelists from the show Bad Boys, with close links to Parisi, were paid substantial sums for campaign work.

== Personal life ==
Parisi married Laura Lee Campbell on 16 June 1996 in Clarke County, Georgia, United States. The couple divorced on 5 January 2009. He later married Denise Tarziján, with whom he had twins. He is currently in a relationship with the Argentine-Spanish Mariela García Gombi, with whom he has two children.

He has a sister, Zandra, who was elected as a member of the Chamber of Deputies for the Party of the People in 2025.

== Published works ==
- Parisi F., Franco; Parisi F., Antonino; Cornejo, E. (2006). Análisis y gestión de créditos. Ediciones Copygraph.
- Parisi F., Franco; Parisi F., Antonino; Godoy, R. (2001). Corporate Governance in Chile: A Revision. Research in International Business and Finance.
- Parisi F., Franco; Parisi F., Antonino (2004). Teoría de inversiones. Parisi Media. (CD-ROM)
- Parisi F., Franco; Parisi F., Antonino (2004). Estructuras financieras. Parisi Media. (CD-ROM)
- Parisi F., Franco; Parisi F., Antonino (2004). Política y administración de créditos. Parisi Media. (CD-ROM)
