= Party of the People (Chile) =

Party of the People Partido de la Gente
- Abbreviation: PDG
- Leader: Franco Parisi
- President: Dennise Catalán
- General Secretary: Franco Parisi
- Founded: 13 December 2019
- Registered: 26 July 2021
- Preceded by: Power of the People – Franco Parisi Social Movement
- Headquarters: Enríque Olivares n°211, La Florida, Santiago de Chile
- Membership (2026): 42,785 (5th)
- Ideology: Populism; Catch-all politics Anti-establishment; E-democracy
- Political position: Big tent
- Related institutions: Felices y Forrados; Banco Democracia Real
- Colours: Blue
- Slogan: El poder de la gente ('The power of the people')
- Chamber of Deputies: 14 / 155
- Senate: 0 / 50
- Mayoralty: 0 / 345
- Council: 2 / 2,252

Website
- pdgchile.cl
- Politics of Chile; Political parties; Elections; A: The party has also been described as centre-right to right-wing.

The Party of the People, or People's Party, (Spanish: Partido de la Gente, PdG) is a Chilean political party, primarily described as populist of the syncretic kind, due to its indifference to the left–right political spectrum, although it has also been variously considered as right-wing populist. It was created at the end of 2019, being legalized by the Electoral Service on July 26, 2021. It is led by 2013, 2021 and 2025 presidential candidate Franco Parisi, and by the founder of "Felices y Forrados" Gino Lorenzini.

At the time of its legalization in July 2021, the party had about 43,000 members, the second largest number of members of any party in Chile after the Communist Party. Among its adherents is the conventional constituent-elect Rodrigo Logan of district 9.

== History ==
It was founded on December 13, 2019, domiciled in the city of Santiago. Its founders are economists Franco Parisi (who was an independent candidate in the 2013 presidential election) and Gino Lorenzini, and many of its adherents were members of the presidential command of Parisi called "The Power of the People-Social Movement Franco Parisi".

Lorenzini, on the other hand, was the founder of Felices y Forrados, a pension advisory company that tried to bring independent candidates to the 2021 Chilean Constitutional Convention election that were rejected by the Electoral Service (Servel) for failing to comply with the rules of financing of politics. According to press releases, Lorenzini could be PDG presidential candidate for the 2021 election.

On May 28, 2021, they announced the collection of 35 thousand signatures, which would allow them to register as a political party in the 16 regions of the country, if Servel validates the rubrics. On the same day, 30,258 signatures were submitted to Servel to register the community in all regions of the country. Later, Lorenzini and Parisi gave their support to the collection of signatures for the legalization of the United Centre party, with whom they seek to develop a joint list of parliamentary candidacies. On July 26, Servel accepted the application for registration of the party in all regions of Chile.

=== 2021 presidential candidacy ===
On August 11, 2021, Gino Lorenzini announced that he would present an independent candidacy for the presidency of the Republic, the product of a break within the party due to differences with Franco Parisi, thus leaving the collectivity. The party planned to hold an internal digital primary between Lorenzini and Parisi to define its presidential candidate, a method Lorenzini rejected, stating that he would run as a candidate whatever the outcome.

After announcing his candidacy, Lorenzini said that "the option with which the PDG became a party grew so much ambition that this dictatorship began to be implemented. The ambition grew so much that they went crazy with the quotas of deputies and senators, and the bases are divided, so instead of uniting we are being divided." After learning that he was collecting signatures as an independent, the PDG issued a statement in which they stated: 'Gino decided to start a personal option, and he distances himself from our project." In this context, Lorenzini published days later through Felices y Forrados that if his political militancy were ratified before the Servel, he would go to the PDG primaries, and called to leave behind the divisions between his adherents and those of Parisi.

== Ideology ==
The party has been defined as catch-all and populist, in addition to trying to use the label of "independent", publicly defining its political position as “neither left nor right” and appealing to the concept of the "people" as part of its political discourse.

== Governance ==
Party authorities are:

- President: Luis Moreno Villablanca
- Vice President: Jorge Luis Passadore Soto
- General Secretary: Luis Emilio Peña Rojo
- Treasurer: Rafael Huenchuñir Gatica
- National Coordinator: Christian Cid Barahona
- Executive Secretary: Gloria Vera Rubio

== Presidential candidates ==
The following is a list of the presidential candidates supported by the Party of the People. (Information gathered from the Archive of Chilean Elections).

- 2021: Franco Parisi (Lost)
- 2025: Franco Parisi (Lost)

== Electoral history ==
=== Presidential election ===
Election year	Candidate	1st Round			2nd Round		Results
Election year	Candidate	# Votes	% Votes	Rank	# Votes	% Votes	Results
2021	Franco Parisi	900,064	12.8%	▲3rd	—N/a		Lost
2025	Franco Parisi	2,557,737	19.71%	3rd	—N/a		Lost

=== Congress election ===
Election year	Chamber of Deputies				Senate				Status
Election year	# Votes	% Votes	Seats	+/–	# Votes	% Votes	Seats	+/–	Status
2021	534,881	8.45%	6 / 155	New	378,378	8.12%	0 / 50	New	Opposition
2025	1,285,464	11.99%	14 / 155	▲8	324,630	10.52%	0 / 50	Steady	Opposition

== Bibliography ==
- Padoan, Enrico (2023). "Techno-populism revisited: a comparison between the Italian Five stars Movement (Movimento 5 Stelle) and the Chilean People's Party (Partido de la Gente)" (PDF). Política. 61 (1). Santiago, Chile: Universidad de Chile: 65–90.
