= Helmuth Martínez =

Chilean Lawyer

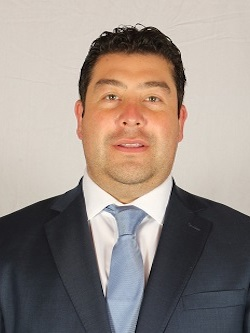

Councilman of Carahue
- Incumbent
- Assumed office 6 December 2024

Member of the Constitutional Convention
- In office 4 July 2021 – 4 July 2022
- Constituency: 23rd District

Personal details
- Born: 15 October 1986 (age 39) Cipolletti, Argentina
- Other political affiliations: The List of the People (2021–2022)
- Education: Temuco Catholic University (LL.B)
- Profession: Lawyer

Helmuth Martínez Llancapán (born 15 October 1986) is a Chilean lawyer and independent politician.

He served as a member of the Constitutional Convention, representing the 23rd District of the Araucanía Region.

== Biography life ==
He was born on 15 October 1986 in Cipolletti, Argentina. He is the son of Helmuth José Martínez Martínez and Rosa María Llancapán Porma. He is married to Daniela Cid Paz.

He completed his primary education at Escuela Apocalipsis, in the Quillem Bajo sector of the commune of Carahue, and later at Escuela Kim Ruka. He completed his secondary education at Liceo Claudio Arrau, also in his hometown. He subsequently studied Law at the Temuco Catholic University.

In his professional career, he has worked as a lawyer in private practice. He worked at the Office for the Protection of the Rights of Children and Adolescents of the Araucanía Coast, served for six years as a legal advisor to the Municipality of Saavedra, and since 2019 has carried out various substitute appointments at the Notary Office of Carahue.

== Political career ==
Martínez is an independent politician. In the public sphere, his work has focused on pastoral activities within the Catholic Church from a young age to the present, as well as providing legal advice to indigenous communities, social organizations, and neighborhood associations in the coastal area of the Araucanía Region, particularly in the communes of Carahue and Saavedra.

In the elections held on 15 and 16 May 2021, he ran as an independent candidate for the Constitutional Convention representing the 23rd District of the Araucanía Region, as part of the Lista del Pueblo pact. He obtained 7,218 votes, corresponding to 4.4% of the valid votes cast.

In October 2024, he was elected as mayor of Carahue.
