= Change for Chile =

Political coalition in Chile

Change for Chile Cambio por Chile
- Abbreviation: CpCh
- Leaders: José Antonio Kast; Johannes Kaiser
- Founders: José Antonio Kast; Johannes Kaiser; Sara Concha
- Founded: 15 April 2025
- Registered: 8 August 2025
- Preceded by: Christian Social Front
- Ideology: National conservatism Right-wing populism Christian right Pinochetism; Right-wing antiglobalism Anti-communism; Antifeminism; Anti-immigration; Economic liberalism
- Political position: Far-right
- Coalition members: Republican Party; National Libertarian Party; Christian Social Party
- Colours: Blue and red
- Chamber of Deputies: 42 / 155
- Senate: 8 / 50

Election symbol
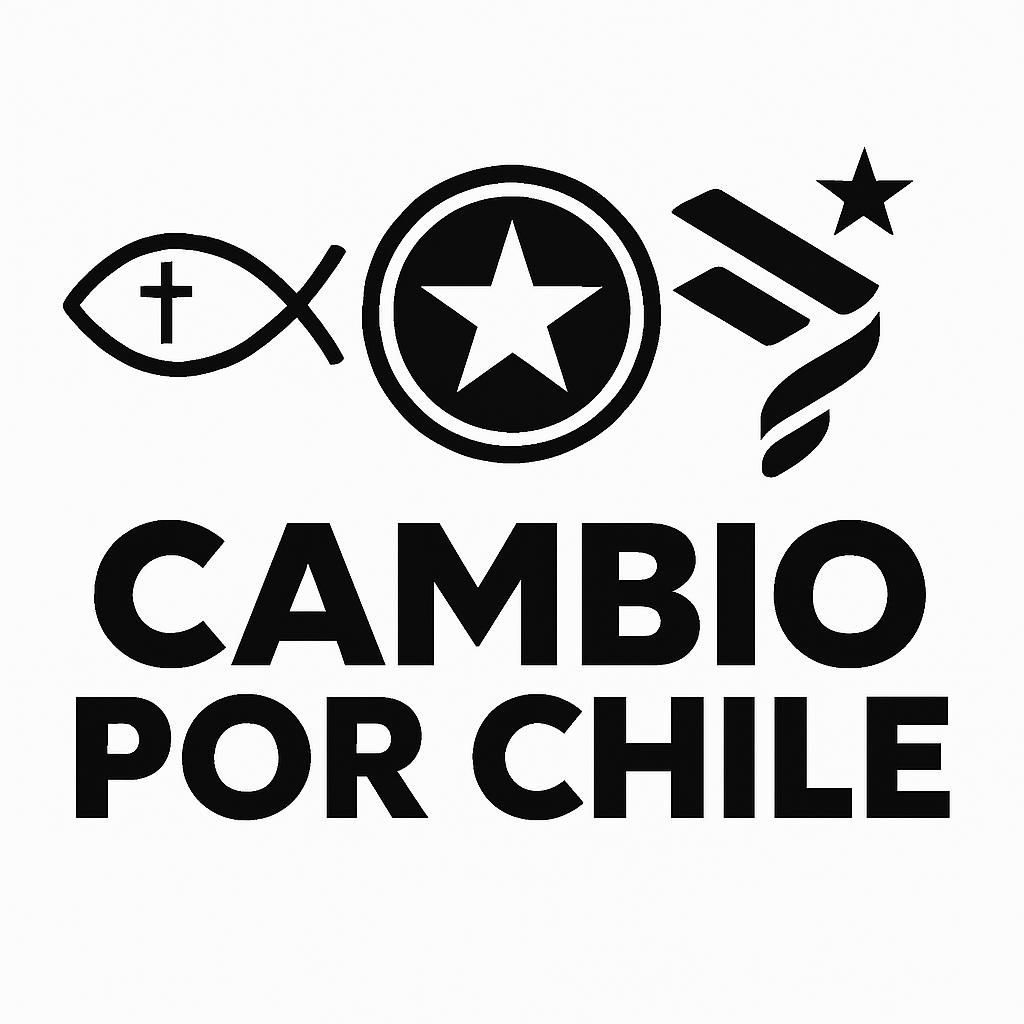

Change for Chile (Spanish: Cambio por Chile, CpCh) is a Chilean electoral coalition between the far-right Republican, Christian Social and National Libertarian parties, created ahead of the 2025 parliamentary election. Before its official registration in August 2025, the coalition was known by the names New Right (Spanish: Nueva Derecha) and United Right (Spanish: Derecha Unida).

== History ==
=== Establishment ===
On 15 April 2025, three far-right parties (PRCh, PSC, PNL) had announced a preliminary agreement to compete together in the 2025 parliamentary election in a coalition called "New Right". With this decision, the parties closed the door to the option of creating a single right-of-centre list together with Chile Vamos, which sought a rapprochement with all the forces opposed to the government of Gabriel Boric. In July 2025, the parties ratified their intention to form a parliamentary alliance by concluding a pact, albeit renaming it the "United Right". In parallel, the Republican Party opened up to a negotiation with Chile Vamos to reach an omission pact in the senatorial election in the binomial regions (where two senators are elected).

The alliance was not replicated for the 2025 presidential election, as the parties that formed it support different presidential candidates: the Republican Party and the Christian Social Party supported José Antonio Kast; while the National Libertarian Party supported the candidacy of Johannes Kaiser, all parties in the coalition endorsed Kast in the second round, which he won.

=== Registration ===
The Republican, Social Christian, and National Libertarian parties formalized their pact before the Electoral Service (Servel) on 8 August 2025, under the name "Change for Chile". The list announced the presentation of 183 candidates for the Chamber of Deputies.

== Composition ==
The coalition is made up of the following parties:

Party	Abbr.	Ideology	Political position	President
Republican Party of Chile; Partido Republicano de Chile	PRCh	Right-wing populism National conservatism Pinochetism	Far-right	Arturo Squella
National Libertarian Party; Partido Nacional Libertario	PNL	Paleolibertarianism; National conservatism Christian libertarianism	Far-right	Johannes Kaiser
Christian Social Party; Partido Social Cristiano	PSC	Christian right Christian fundamentalism Ultraconservatism	Far-right	Sara Concha
