= Teresa Marinovic =

Columnist

Teresa Marinovic Vial
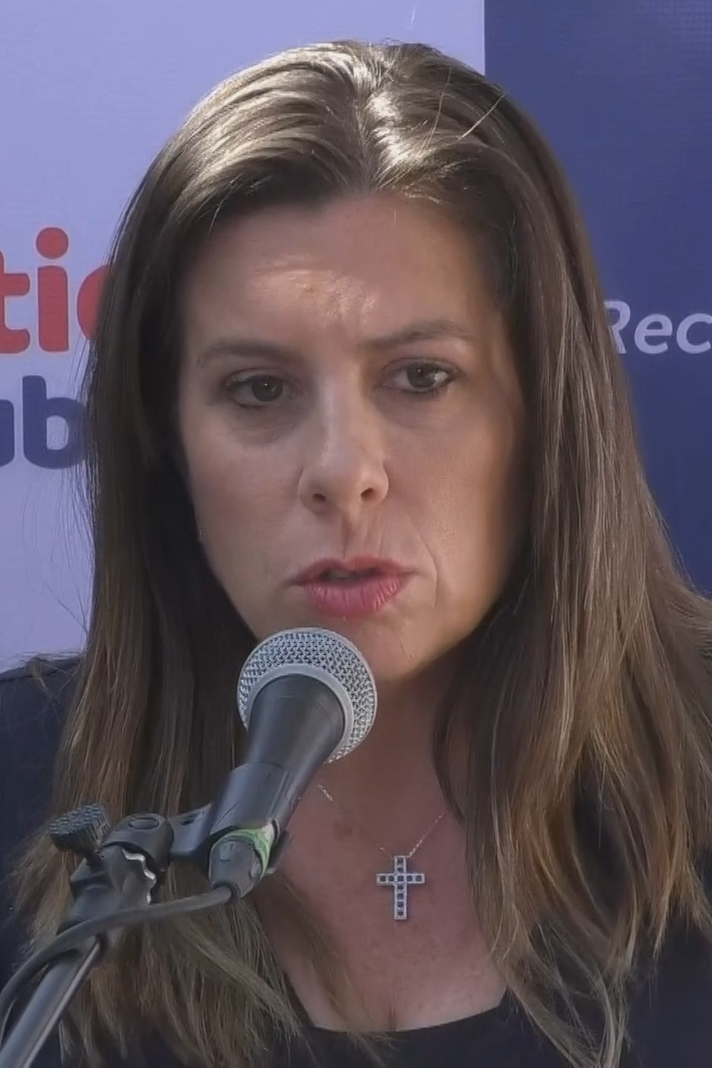

Member of the Constitutional Convention
- In office 4 July 2021 – 4 July 2022
- Constituency: 10th District

Personal details
- Born: Teresa Margarita Natalia Marinovic Vial; 3 February 1973 (age 53) Viña del Mar, Chile (Note: During the 24 January 2021 edition of Café Cargado, a La Red talk show hosted by Checho Hirane, Marinovic said she was born in Viña del Mar because "she was not scheduled" and was born in the middle of her parents' holidays.)
- Party: Close to Republican Party (2020-2023)
- Spouse: Ricardo Alcalde Rodríguez
- Children: Nine
- Occupation: Columnist
- Nickname: Tere Marinovic

Teresa Margarita Natalia Marinovic Vial (born 3 February 1973) is a Chilean columnist and ex politician of conservative-libertarian ideology who served as member of the 2021-2022 Constitutional Convention. She is known for her outspoken personality, her confrontational approach to politics and her far-right political orientation.

She received a degree in philosophy at the University of The Andes, where for ten years she worked as teacher in courses of philosophical anthropology, theory of truth and theology. She has also worked as a columnist for the Chilean newspapers El Mostrador and Las Últimas Noticias, as well as in the multimedia area with Radio Bío-Bío. In 2018, she was appointed executive director of the Fundación Nueva Mente, a libertarian think tank.

She was elected as a member of the Constitutional Convention by District 10, receiving the second largest number of votes in the district and the largest number of votes of her electoral list: Vamos por Chile.

== Early life ==
Marinovic, of Croatian and Basque descent, attended secondary school at the Santa Úrsula School in Santiago. In 1991, she was accepted to the University of The Andes, where she received a philosophy degree with a focus on contemporary philosophy. She has stated that she supported Augusto Pinochet regime and still defends its political work despite what she calls its "non-systematic" (Note: Café Cargado, minutes 57:15–57:17.) human right violations. (Note: Café Cargado, minutes 55:34–58:05.)

== Political career ==
=== Rising: Video-columns (2016−2020) ===
She began to become known due to her publication video-opinion columns shared on social networks on the Internet, where she gave her point of view on matters of interest to the Chilean national public opinion. Her editorial line was tendingly social-conservative in value issues whereas liberal in economics. Likewise, she showed herself as an opponent to the governments of Michelle Bachelet (centre-left; 2014–2018) and Sebastián Piñera, whom she criticizes since the beginning of his centre-rightist second government (2018–2022).

Through these platforms and her opinion columns, she has carried out political cyberactivism for different social causes, such as so that the owners who allocate their homes for themselves, do not pay more contributions that increase the price of housing in Chile, in addition to eliminate other taxes and payments to the State that, in her opinion, raise the cost of living in the South American country. She has been in favor of immigration in Chile —as a positive factor for the economy— but against irregular immigration, harshly criticizing the handling of this issue by recent governments. During the 2019–20 Social outbreak, she was against the mobilizations, even sarcastically commenting on an incident that occurred between a policeman and a young man. Marinovic called him a "criminal" and also asked about the health of the young man "who was swimming in the Mapocho [river]."

At the end of 2020, she was proposed by José Antonio Kast's Republican Party to be included as a candidate for the Constitutional Convention, whose political views aligned with Kast's but was not well received by parts of the center-right. She was finally registered with the Electoral Service on the list of "Vamos por Chile", the electoral pact of Chile Vamos (Piñera's coalition). However, Marinovic won with a high percentage of votes and, thanks to the D'Hondt method, many other candidates were able to enter the Constitutional Convention with her triumph.

=== Constitutional Convention (2021−22) ===
On 4 July 2021, Marinovic was invested as constituent. Nevertheless, that day was marked by riots outside the Pereira Palace, groups she harshly criticized and about –recording in live by Instagram through her cellphone– she had a tense debate with future president of the Convention Elisa Loncón, who told Marinovic "why did you come here to provoke?".

Days later, in the fourth session of the convention, she clashed again with the now president Loncón on Loncón's statements about the death of the Mapuche Weichafe Pablo Marchant in Carahue, who died in a confrontation with Carabineros de Chile. Marinovic reminded that Loncón "is the president of the all Convention" and that her 'debatable' opinions were unnecessary. Likewise, Marinovic has called Machi Francisca Linconao a "dictator". Then, in the tense ninth session of 20 July (due to the issue of human rights), she directly criticized to Linconao for speaking in Mapudungun and not in Spanish. Because to all of that, Marinovic was criticized by constituents like Ramona Reyes (Socialist Party), who considered Marinovic as a racist person. Later, the same day, she was faced by the constituent Valentina Miranda (Communist Party), who told Marinovic to "keep that intolerance" to herself. Besides, Miranda assured said that to her in representation of who are of Mapuche descent, reason why –according her– she wore the Colo-Colo T-shirt.

Two days after the controversy with Linconao, the centre-right constituent Hernán Larraín Matte (Evópoli) stated that: "I told Teresa Marinovic that I did not agree with the provocation she made". and that "all deserve respect". Elapsed the controversy, on 29 July, she received a gift from the poet Felipe Cussen: a Mapudungun dictionary for that "together let's learn this beautiful language"; she took the present with humor and published herself smiling with the dictionary on her Instagram account.

On 3 August 2021, she generated controversy after getting into a shouting match with Jaime Bassa, the vice president of the convention.

== Personal life ==
She had nine children, six daughters and three sons, who were born during her first marriage, which ended in divorce.

Her current partner is the lawyer Enrique Alcalde Rodríguez, member of the Supreme Court of Chile.

== See also ==
- List of members of the Chilean Constitutional Convention
