= Johannes Kaiser (Chilean politician) =

Chilean politician (born 1976)

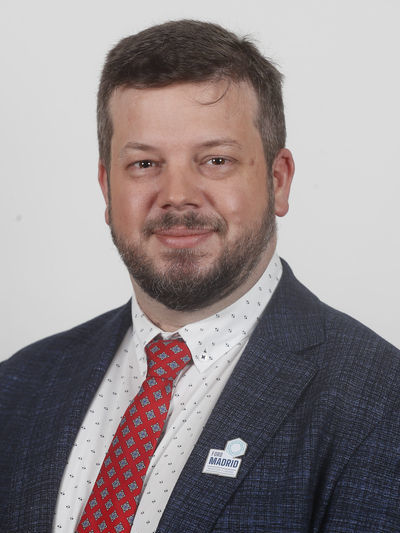
- Official portrait, 2022

Member of the Chamber of Deputies
- In office 11 March 2022 – 11 March 2026
- Preceded by: Luciano Cruz-Coke
- Constituency: District 10

Personal details
- Born: Johannes Maximilian Kaiser Barends; 5 January 1976 (age 50) Santiago, Chile
- Party: PNL (since 2024)
- Other political affiliations: UDI (formerly); PRCh (2019–2021; 2022–2024)
- Spouse: Ivette Avaria Vera (m. 2022)
- Children: 3
- Relatives: Vanessa and Axel Kaiser (siblings)
- Education: Finis Terrae University; Heidelberg University; University of Innsbruck (did not graduate from any)
- Occupation: Activist • YouTuber • Politician
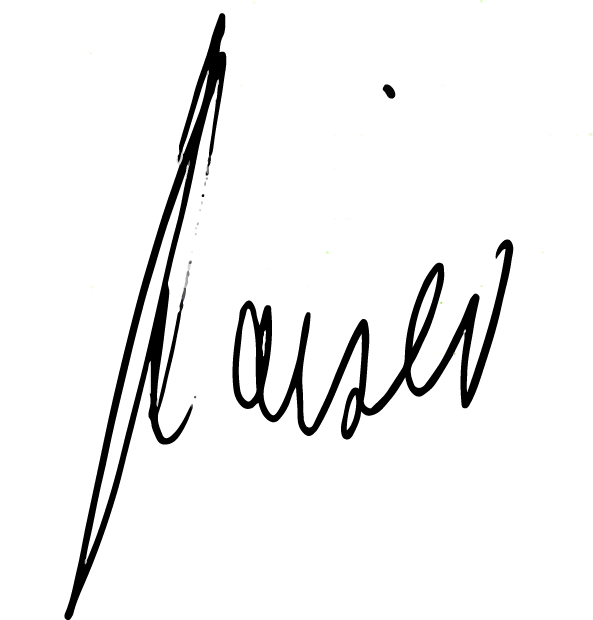
- Signature

YouTube information
- Channel: El Nacional-Libertario
- Years active: 2013–present
- Subscribers: 162.000
- Views: 34.4 million
- Last updated: November 2025

Johannes Maximilian Kaiser Barents-von Hohenhagen (born 5 January 1976) is a Chilean politician, activist, and YouTuber. A figure on the far-right of Chilean politics, he is the founder of the National Libertarian Party (PNL) and a former member of the Republican Party (PRCh). He served in the Chamber of Deputies of Chile from 2022 to 2026 and was a candidate in the 2025 presidential election, in which he finished fourth with 13.93% of the vote.

== Early life and education ==
Johannes Kaiser was born in Santiago on 5 January 1976 into a family of German Chileans. His paternal grandfather, Friedrich Ernst Kaiser Richter, was a social democratic activist who fled Nazi Germany in 1936, settling in Chile where he later served as mayor of Villarrica. His father, Juan Cristián Kaiser Wagner, was active in the National Party.

Kaiser attended several schools, including the German School of Santiago and the Bernardo O'Higgins Military Academy for his final high school years. He subsequently enrolled in law at Finis Terrae University but did not complete his degree. He later studied at Heidelberg University in Germany and the University of Innsbruck in Austria, but graduated from none of these institutions.

During his time in Austria, he worked as a freelance sports journalist for FC Wacker Innsbruck.

== Media career and early activism ==
In September 2013, Kaiser launched his political YouTube channel, El Nacional-Libertario, which has amassed over 100,000 subscribers. The channel became a platform for his right-libertarianism and social-conservative views, often featuring content critical of immigration, feminism, and what he termed "globalist" agendas.

He campaigned for José Antonio Kast in the 2017 presidential election and joined Kast's newly formed Republican Party in 2019. Previously, he had been a member of the Independent Democratic Union (UDI).

== Political career ==
=== Chamber of Deputies ===
==== 2022–2024: Election and Republican Party tenure ====
In the 2021 Chilean general election, Kaiser was elected to the Chamber of Deputies, representing District 10 of the Santiago Metropolitan Region.

His election was immediately overshadowed by controversy when a 2018 video resurfaced in which he made sarcastic comments questioning women's suffrage in the context of the New Year's Eve sexual assaults in Germany. The resulting backlash led Kaiser to resign from the Republican Party, though he continued to sit with their parliamentary caucus as an independent.

During his term, Kaiser served on committees for Human Rights and Indigenous Peoples, National Defense, Interior Government and Regionalization, and Ethics and Transparency. He rejoined the Republican Party in September 2022 but resigned again in January 2024 after internal conflicts over the party's position in the 2023 Chilean constitutional plebiscite, where Kaiser voted against the official party line.

=== 2025 presidential campaign ===
On February 19, 2024, Kaiser announced his presidential candidacy for the 2025 Chilean presidential election. He initially considered participating in the Chile Vamos primaries but later ruled this out, citing disagreements with the coalition's policies.

In June 2024, he founded the National Libertarian Party, describing it as a "reactionary" movement that combines social conservatism with minarchist principles. The party formed a parliamentary pact called "New Right" with the Republican and Christian Social Parties.

Key proposals of his campaign include reviving the controversial HidroAysén hydroelectric project, reinstating Santiago's traditional "yellow buses," drastically reducing the number of government ministries, implementing stricter immigration controls, and strengthening gun ownership rights.

He officially registered his candidacy with the Electoral Service on August 14, 2025, and finished fourth in the first round with 13.93% of the vote.

== Political positions ==
Kaiser describes his ideology as paleolibertarian, combining social conservatism with minarchist views on the role of the state. He identifies as a reactionary rather than a conservative.

His platform emphasizes:

- Strong opposition to illegal immigration
- Support for gun ownership rights
- Opposition to abortion and euthanasia
- Reduction of the state apparatus
- Support for traditional family values
- Economic liberalization

Media outlets have frequently characterized him as far-right, populist, Pinochetist, and ultraconservative.

== Controversies ==
=== Statements on women's suffrage and sexual violence ===
In 2018, Kaiser made sarcastic comments about women's suffrage in the context of the New Year's Eve sexual assaults in Germany, suggesting that women who voted for pro-immigration parties were voting against their interests. The comments resurfaced during his 2021 election campaign, leading to accusations of misogyny and his temporary resignation from the Republican Party.

He later clarified that his comments were taken out of context and that he was criticizing what he saw as voting against one's interests, not opposing women's suffrage.

=== Comments on historical human rights abuses ===
In 2021, Kaiser stated that victims of the Pisagua case executions during the military dictatorship were "well shot" and claimed that in Chile "too little shooting was done." The Santiago Court of Appeals ordered the removal of the videos containing these statements and imposed a fine, ruling that they constituted hate speech.

=== Support for military coup ===
During his 2025 presidential campaign, Kaiser stated he would "without a doubt" support a military coup under circumstances similar to those preceding the 1973 Chilean coup d'état. The comments drew widespread condemnation across the political spectrum.

=== Vaccine skepticism ===
In 2025, Kaiser questioned Chile's vaccination program, suggesting vaccines "work with heavy metals" and advocating for reconsideration of mandatory immunization. Health experts strongly rebutted his claims, noting vaccines do not contain heavy metals and warning against spreading misinformation.

== Personal life ==
Kaiser comes from a politically active family. His siblings include Axel Kaiser, a prominent classical liberal intellectual; Vanessa Kaiser, a senator-elect in 2025 for the National Libertarian Party; and Leif Kaiser, leader of the Chilean Rifle Association.

He married Ivette Avaria Vera in 2022, with whom he has one daughter. He has two other children from previous relationships. The family practices Orthodox Christianity.

== Electoral history ==
Year	Type	Territory	Coalition	Party	Votes	%	Result
2021	Parliamentary deputy	10th district	Christian Social Front	PRCh	26,610	5.82	Elected
