= National Libertarian Party =

National Libertarian Party Partido Nacional Libertario
- Abbreviation: PNL
- President: Johannes Kaiser
- Founder: Johannes Kaiser
- Founded: 12 July 2024
- Split from: Republican Party
- Headquarters: San Damian Oriente, Las Condes, Santiago de Chile
- Youth wing: National Libertarian Youth
- Membership (2026): 50,514 (2nd)
- Ideology: Market fundamentalism Paleolibertarianism; Ultraconservatism; Pinochetism; Reactionism
- Political position: Far-right
- National affiliation: Change for Chile
- Colours: Orange; Navy blue
- Chamber of Deputies: 8 / 155
- Senate: 1 / 43

Website
- nacionallibertario.cl

The National Libertarian Party (Spanish: Partido Nacional Libertario) is a Chilean political party led by Johannes Kaiser. It was founded by five libertarian members of the national conservative Republican Party in the Chamber of Deputies. Its legalisation process by the Electoral Service is in course. The party has presented more than 46,080 signatures in 13 of the 16 regions of the country.

The party ran Johannes Kaiser as their presidential candidate in the 2025 Chilean presidential election.

== History ==
The Libertarian National Party was formed around the figure of the politician Johannes Kaiser and the discontent of other dissident members of the Republican Party of Chile. Political analysts explained that this discontent among more "purist" members was with the party's performance and support for the 2023 new constitutional proposal. Additionally, they attributed Kaiser’s rise in popularity and the formation of the party to a broader phenomenon related to the emergence of disruptive figures from the right such as Javier Milei or Donald Trump.

The party was created on July 12, 2024 and currently holds six seats in the Chamber of Deputies of Chile. Although the candidacy of Johannes Kaiser for the Chile Vamos primary elections for the 2025 Chilean presidential election was initially considered, this option was discarded after the approval of the pension reform project by said coalition. However, Kaiser has expressed his openness to a primary with candidates from the Christian Social Party and the Republican Party.

Influential Pinochetist journalist, Hermógenes Pérez de Arce, gave support to the party in the 2025 Chilean general election due to the PLR pursuing a new constitution when elected in the 2023 Chilean Constitutional Council elections despite promises from many party members that the 1980 Constitution would be preserved.

== Ideology ==
Several media outlets have categorized the party as far-right although the party itself and Johannes Kaiser prefer to describe it as right-wing. When asked about it, Kaiser stated that he does not believe in the existence of the far right and that "we do not have arsenals, we do not violently attack our political opponents […] I would call it a more 'consistent' or 'fundamentalist' right". The party is Minarchist and Atlantist, Comparable to Argentina's La Libertad Avanza and Columbia's Defenders of the Homeland. Socially, it is conservative. The party has found success among the internet-influenced youth, older voters preferring José Antonio Kast.

== Leadership ==
The provisional leadership of the National Libertarian Party is composed of:

- President: Johannes Kaiser
- Vice President: Hans Marowski
- General Secretary: Juan Antonio Urzúa Meneses
- Deputy Secretary: Karina Sapunar

== Authorities ==
=== Deputies ===
The National Libertarian Party has six deputies for the 2022-2026 period:

Name	Region	District
Cristián Labbé Martínez	Metropolitan	8
Johannes Kaiser Barents-Von Hohenhagen	Metropolitan	10
Gonzalo de la Carrera Correa	Metropolitan	11
Gloria Naveillán Arriagada	Araucanía	22
Cristóbal Urruticoechea Ríos	Biobío	21
Leonidas Romero Sáez	Biobío	20

== Election results ==
=== Presidential elections ===
Election year	Candidate	1st Round		Results
Election year	Candidate	# Votes	% Votes	Results
2025	Johannes Kaiser	1,808,434	13.94%	Lost

=== Congress elections ===
Election year	Chamber of Deputies			Senate			Status
Election year	# Votes	% Votes	Seats	# Votes	% Votes	Seats	Status
2025	679,500	6.34%	8 / 155	171,602	5.54%	1 / 50	Support
