= Evelyn Matthei =

Chilean politician (born 1953)

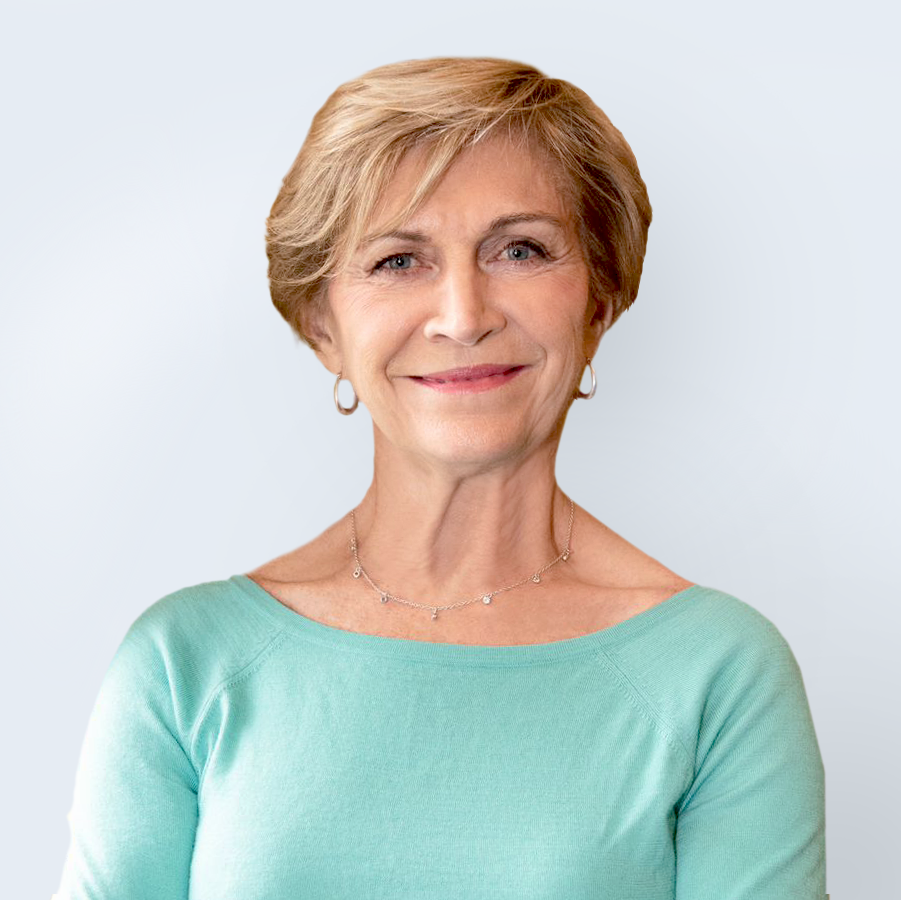
- Official portrait, 2024

Mayor of Providencia
- In office 6 December 2016 – 6 December 2024
- Preceded by: Josefa Errázuriz
- Succeeded by: Jaime Bellolio

Minister of Labor and Social Provision
- In office 16 January 2011 – 22 July 2013
- President: Sebastián Piñera
- Preceded by: Camila Merino
- Succeeded by: Juan Carlos Jobet

Member of the Senate
- In office 11 March 1998 – 16 January 2011
- Preceded by: Alberto Cooper
- Succeeded by: Gonzalo Uriarte
- Constituency: Coquimbo Region

Member of the Chamber of Deputies
- In office 11 March 1990 – 11 March 1998
- Constituency: 23rd district (1990–1994); 15th district (1994–1998)

Personal details
- Born: Evelyn Rose Matthei Fornet; 11 November 1953 (age 72) Santiago, Chile
- Party: RN (1987–1993); Independent (1993–1999); UDI (1999–present)
- Other political affiliations: Alliance (1989–2015); Chile Vamos (2015–present)
- Spouse: Jorge Desormeaux
- Children: 3
- Parent(s): Fernando Matthei (father); Elda Fornet (mother)
- Education: Pontifical Catholic University of Chile
- Occupation: Economist • Politician
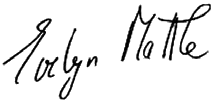
- Signature

Evelyn Rose Matthei Fornet (born 11 November 1953) is a Chilean politician associated with the Independent Democratic Union (UDI).

Over more than three decades of public service, she has served as Minister of Labor and Social Provision, senator, deputy and mayor. Educated in economics at the Pontifical Catholic University of Chile, Matthei began her career as a lecturer before moving into financial regulation and private-sector management. She was first elected to Congress in 1989 and later to the Senate, where she served on committees related to labour, finance and economic policy.

From 2011 to 2013 she served as Minister under Sebastián Piñera, where she was recognised for her direct style and emphasis on institutional accountability. In 2013, Matthei advanced to the second round of Chile's presidential election, losing to Michelle Bachelet by a wide margin. Between 2016 and 2024, she was Mayor of Providencia, focusing on urban management, public safety and administrative transparency.

Ideologically, Matthei describes herself as a pragmatic conservative, supporting market economics and fiscal discipline while maintaining moderate positions on social issues such as gender equality and reproductive rights. Her pragmatic orientation has placed her among the centrist figures of the Chilean right.

== Family and early life ==
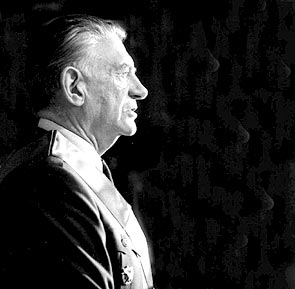
Matthei's father, Fernando Matthei (pictured in 1982), was a member of the Pinochet junta that ruled Chile from 1973 to 1990. He was the first member of the government to recognise Pinochet's defeat in the 1988 plebiscite, aiding the Chilean transition to democracy.

Matthei was born in Santiago de Chile, the second child of Elda Fornet Fernández, of Spanish descent, and Fernando Matthei Aubel, a military officer of German origin. Her father served as Minister of Health under Pinochet and later as Commander-in-chief of the Chilean Air Force, sitting on the Military Junta until the return to democracy.

Raised as a Lutheran, she grew up within a minority faith inside the otherwise Catholic military regime. As a child living in Antofagasta, the Matthei family maintained a close friendship with that of future president Michelle Bachelet. Bachelet's father, Alberto Bachelet, a brigadier general in the Air Force, was a friend and colleague of Fernando Matthei.

Following the 1973 overthrow of Salvador Allende, Alberto Bachelet—who had opposed the coup—was imprisoned and died in custody, while Fernando Matthei succeeded him within the Air Force hierarchy. Decades later, in the 2013 presidential race, the daughters of these two men—Bachelet and Matthei—would face each other as political rivals. Educated at the German School of Santiago, Matthei developed an early passion for music and piano, securing scholarships to pursue a career as a concert pianist. When her father was appointed military attaché to the Chilean Embassy in London, she continued her studies in Britain but, after three years, decided to return home, concluding that professional performance was not her vocation.

In 1974 she entered the Economics Institute of the Pontifical Catholic University of Chile, obtaining a licentiate in Economics and ranking among the top of her class, though the theft of her thesis prevented her from completing the professional licence. While studying, she worked as a research assistant with future president Sebastián Piñera on a Latin American Economic Commission paper on poverty and collaborated on a textbook on monetary theory with Professor Hernando Cortés.

Matthei began her professional career teaching International Economics at her alma mater before joining the private consultancy Forestal S.A. and later the Superintendencia de AFP, the regulatory agency of Chile's new pension system. Promoted to department head within a year, she resigned in 1986 to become Vice-President of Tourism, Commerce and Securities at Bancard S.A., a financial firm linked to the expanding market economy. She also advised the government's Social and Economic Commission and returned to the Catholic University as lecturer in introductory economics, combining academic work with early experience in policy analysis.

== Political career ==
Matthei entered Chilean politics in the late 1980s, after the military government relaxed restrictions on political activity. In 1987 she joined National Renewal (RN), a conservative party supportive of Augusto Pinochet. She took part in the 1988 plebiscite as a spokesperson for the "Sí" campaign, representing RN in televised broadcasts advocating technical training and employment. Her father, Air Force commander Fernando Matthei, was the first junta member to acknowledge Pinochet's defeat.

Elected to the Chamber of Deputies in 1989 for District 23 (Las Condes, Lo Barnechea and Vitacura), she served on the Finance and Labour committees and promoted the 1992 law on organ transplantation following extensive public consultations. Within RN she helped form the "Youth Patrol" alongside Sebastián Piñera, Andrés Allamand, and Alberto Espina, a group that modernized party leadership.

In 1992, her presidential ambitions were interrupted by the Piñeragate scandal, after a recording of Piñera disparaging her was aired publicly; Matthei later admitted to having obtained the tape through a military contact and withdrew her candidacy. She soon resigned from RN and sat as an independent near the UDI bench.

Elected again as deputy for Valparaíso (1994–1998) with UDI backing, she joined committees on Labour, Economy, and Foreign Relations. During this period she supported former minister Francisco Javier Cuadra in the "Allamand Drug Case," which strained her ties with Allamand for years. In 1998 she co-founded the "Women's Movement for Chilean Dignity" to protest Augusto Pinochet's arrest in London.

=== Support for Pinochet: 1998 ===
A significant aspect of Matthei's political legacy is her early and unequivocal support for Augusto Pinochet during the 1988 plebiscite—a position largely influenced by her family background, given that her father served in the military junta. Over time, however, she has moderated her rhetoric on this issue. While she acknowledges her past support, she now emphasizes a commitment to moving past Pinochet, distancing herself from the more doctrinaire elements of her earlier positions.

In 2018, she stated that "I have never been a Pinochet supporter in my life ... nor was my father. I have never been a fanatic ... [the impacts of Pinochet] are mixed, nobody is that good, and nobody is that bad."

Regardless, she continues to defend her father, who has never been charged with any crime after the dictatorship.

It hurts me because I come from a military family. When my father took over as commander-in-chief of the Air Force, he traveled to all the air bases and told all his people, 'Don't get involved in a human rights problem because not only will I not support you, but I myself will turn you over to justice.' He was concerned. While my father was in charge of the Air Force, there was not a single act of human rights violation committed by a person in the Air Force. For us as a family, it was a very important issue. If someone, despite everything my father had told them, had committed a human rights violation, my father would have taken the blame, and that is what Pinochet did not do. When you are the boss, you show your face, in good times and in bad.

— Matthei in 2023

This candid evolution is consistent with Matthei's overall political style, which prizes honesty and adaptability over strict ideological adherence. She has maintained since redemocratization a belief in the prosecution of human rights violation and criticized the denial of such atrocities.

=== UDI: 1999–present ===
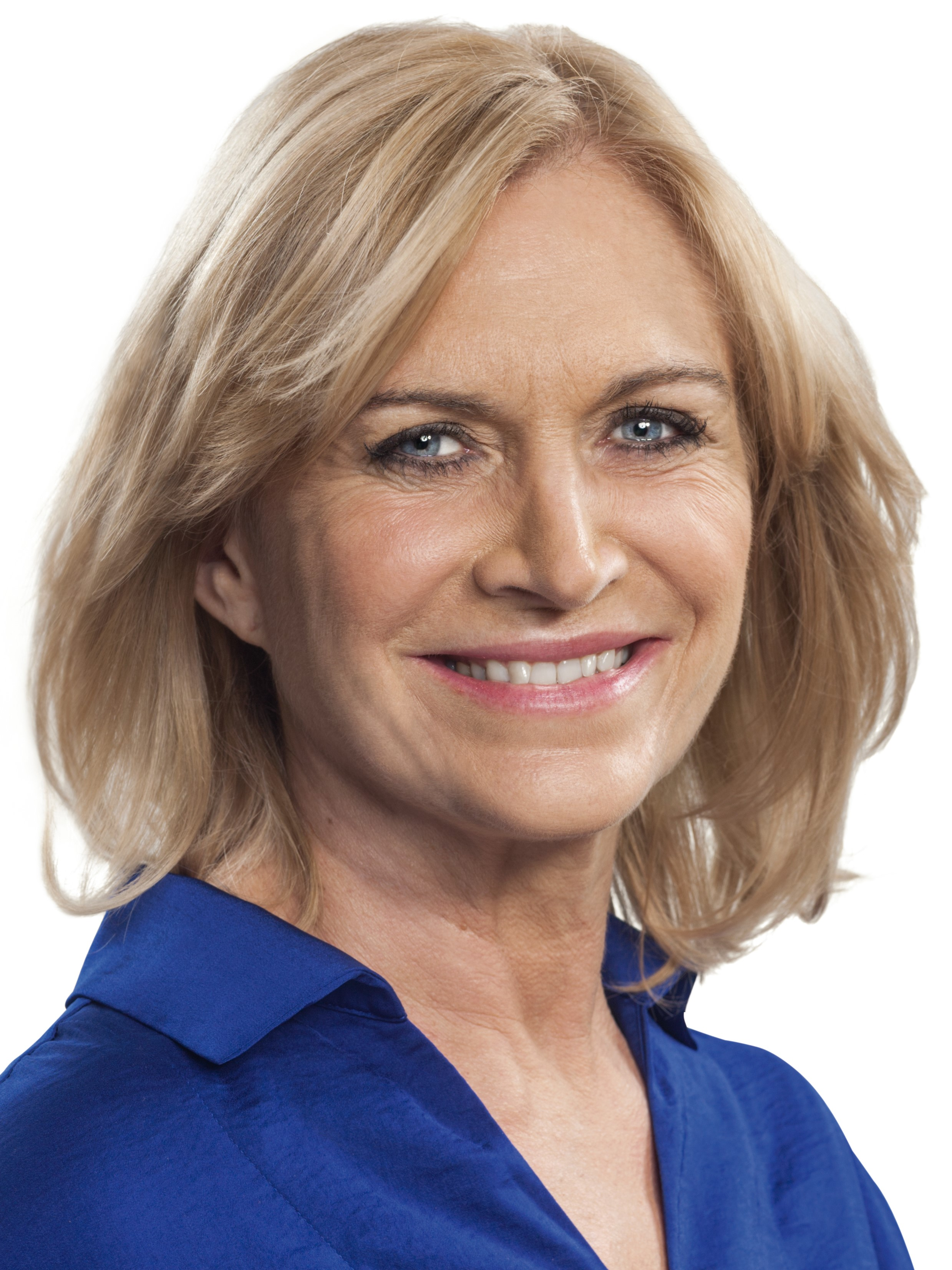
Matthei in 2013

Joining the Independent Democratic Union in 1999, she served two terms as senator for Coquimbo Region, chairing the Budget and Audit committees. In 2011 she resigned to become Minister of Labour and Social Provision under President Sebastián Piñera, noted for her confrontational but disciplined style. Her relatively liberal views on abortion, same-sex marriage and taxation distinguished her within the conservative bloc.

After replacing Pablo Longueira as the UDI's presidential candidate, she advanced to the runoff but lost to Michelle Bachelet with 38% of the vote. She later stepped away from national politics, teaching mathematics before returning as Mayor of Providencia (2016–2024). In January 2025, both RN and the UDI proclaimed her as their presidential candidate for the 2025 Chilean presidential election. She placed fifth in the election and did not advance to the runoff, endorsing José Antonio Kast.

== Political positions and persona ==
Matthei's views have shifted over time, but she has always been described as center-right, existing in the political middle.

Reflecting on her own political evolution, Matthei declared at the close of her tenure as mayor of Providencia, "less ideology, more pragmatism", emphasizing the urgent need for unity and practical solutions to national challenges. Even in her first run for public office, her platform was one of "reasoned moderation".

Matthei noted for her combative yet candid approach to politics. She frequently has made herself the target of self-deprecating jokes. The Chilean right, especially in its empowerment of longtime experts, is viewed a technocratic grouping, especially in justifying the technical successes of the Pinochet regime. Matthei has been able to develop a persona outside her "technical self" through her charisma.

This persona has been asset on the right where Andrés Allamand remarked in 1992 "[Matthei's] contribution is not primarily conceptual—the ideas are more or less a given. Matthei's strong suit is when she looks you in the eyes and says 'I care.'"

=== Social views ===
Matthei's social views have been described as progressive conservative.

Matthei supports gay marriage and opposes significant regression of Chile's abortion laws. Even in the 1990s, her speeches and some of her votes in Congress revealed a more liberal stance on social issues—supporting divorce, the morning-after pill, and abortion under three circumstances. She considers herself an ardent feminist.

Matthei opposes legalized euthanasia, but supports the death penalty.

==== Immigration ====
Matthei believes immigration is an issue of public order and empathy, but has continued to drive a hard line against President Boric. She opposes significant structures being built at ports of entry. On illegal or irregular immigrants who commit crimes, she has stated that "I would expel them and their families as well," and regarding the threats posed by organized crime to authorities, she suggested that "it might be necessary to talk about the death penalty for these cases."

Matthei supports appointing a crime czar, but has argued that Bukele-style crime policies would not be legal under Chilean institutions.

=== Economic policy ===
Matthei's economic policy is firmly rooted in free‑market principles, developed during her tenure reforming the social security administration of the Pinochet regime. She advocates for reduced taxation, deregulation, and fiscal discipline as the means to stimulate private enterprise and generate sustainable growth. Matthei has described active government deregulation as the depoliticization of the economy, criticizing the interventionist policies of President Gabriel Boric.

Matthei's record as Minister of Labor, during which she oversaw improvements in employment rates and economic performance, reinforced her view that a robust market economy is essential to providing opportunities that ultimately support social progress. Notably, her approach is considered by some observers as more flexible than that of her conservative peers, blending economic conservatism with a pragmatic openness to necessary reforms.

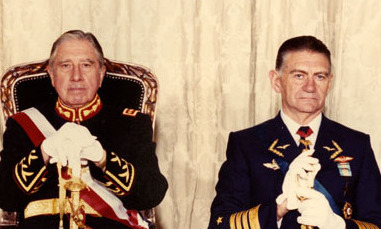
Pinochet (left) and Matthei's father Fernando in 1985

== Personal life ==
Evelyn Matthei is married to fellow economist Jorge Desormeaux Jiménez, with whom she has three children. Desormeaux served as Chilean Central Bank Deputy Governor from 1999 to 2009. Matthei is Catholic, like her mother, but her husband is Lutheran. She has said she has explored Buddhism and says she has her house embrace a policy of religious relativism.

Matthei is a classically trained pianist, and speaks English and German as well as her native Spanish.

Ancestors of Evelyn Matthei

8. Fernando Matthei Jaeger (1848-1908)
4. Fernando Matthei Gunkel (1887-1956)
9. Emilia Gunckel Friedich (1857-1934)
2. Fernando Matthei Aubel (1925-2017)
10. Jorge Aubel Bückle (1868-1922)
5. Luise Aubel Renz (1903-1964)
11. Hedwig Renz Hube (1876-1916)
1. Evelyn Matthei Fornet (born 1953)
3. Elda Fornet Fernández (1926-2004)

== Electoral history ==
Year	Type	Constituency	Coalition	Party	Votes	%	Result
1989	Parliamentary	District 23	Democracy and Progress	RN	79,595	42.32	Deputy
1993	Parliamentary	District 15	Union for the Progress of Chile	ILB	19,572	25.85	Deputy
1997	Parliamentary	Coquimbo Region	Union for Chile	ILB	50,281	23.32	Senator
2005	Parliamentary	Coquimbo Region	Alliance	UDI	71,697	28.47	Senator
2013	Presidential	Chile	Alliance	UDI	1,645,271	25.01	Ballotage
2013	Presidential	Chile	Alliance	UDI	2,111,306	37.38	Not elected
2016	Municipal	Providencia	Chile Vamos	UDI	32,092	53.22	Mayor
2021	Municipal	Providencia	Chile Vamos	UDI	46,890	54.86	Mayor
2025	Presidential	Chile	Chile Vamos	UDI	1,617,720	12.47	Not elected

== See also ==
- List of female Chilean presidential candidates
