= List of elections involving vote splitting =

Vote splitting is an electoral effect in which the distribution of votes among multiple similar candidates reduces the chance of winning for any of the similar candidates, and increases the chance of winning for a dissimilar candidate. This is commonly known as the spoiler effect, which can discourage minor party candidacies.

Vote splitting most easily occurs in plurality voting (also called first-past-the-post) in which each voter indicates a single choice and the candidate with the most votes wins, even if the winner does not have majority support. For example, if candidate A1 receives 30% of the votes, similar candidate A2 receives another 30% of the votes, and dissimilar candidate B receives the remaining 40% of the votes, plurality voting declares candidate B as the winner, even though 60% of the voters prefer either candidate A1 or A2.

== Occurrence ==
One of the main functions of political parties is to mitigate the effect of spoiler-prone voting methods by winnowing on a local level the contenders before the election. Each party nominates at most one candidate per office since each party expects to lose if they nominate more than one. (Note: For example, if the Democrats had nominated both Hillary Clinton and Barack Obama for U.S. President in 2008, it would have allowed the Republican candidate (John McCain) to easily win; the voters who preferred both Clinton and Obama over McCain could not have been relied on to solve the strategy coordination problem on their own.) This means empirical observations of the frequency of spoiled elections may not be a good measure, because they exclude relevant information from candidates who chose not to run.

Vote splitting occurs when candidates or ballot questions (Note: Examples are the first past the post electoral system and in single transferable vote or similar systems with a first-preference votes winning percentage.) have similar ideologies. A spoiler candidate can draw votes from a major candidate with similar politics, thereby causing a strong opponent of both or several to win. The minor candidates causing this effect are referred to as spoilers. (Note: A term designed to appeal to a wider section of the public as a result of the widespread, often national support of political parties.)

The problem also exists in two-round system and instant-runoff voting, since candidates are eliminated based on tallies of first-choice preferences, which get split between similar candidates, though it is reduced, because weaker spoilers are eliminated. All ranked-choice systems suffer from variations of the spoiler effect, according to Arrow's impossibility theorem. However, a candidate that can win head-to-head against all rivals (called a Condorcet winner) can still lose from third place in a 3-way vote split, a phenomenon known as a center squeeze. This occurred in the 2009 Burlington Vermont mayoral election and the 2022 Alaska's at-large congressional district special election.

=== List of systems designed to reduce vote splitting ===
- Approval voting
- Citizens' assembly
- Electoral fusion
- Proportional representation

== Election examples by country ==
=== Australia ===
In Australia, the 1918 Swan by-election saw the conservative vote split between the Country Party and Nationalist Party, which allowed the Australian Labor Party to win the seat. That led the Nationalist government to implement preferential voting in federal elections to allow Country and Nationalist voters to transfer preferences to the other party and to avoid vote splitting. Today, the Liberal Party and National Party rarely run candidates in the same seats, which are known as three-cornered contests. When three-cornered contests do occur the Labor Party would usually direct preferences to the Liberals ahead of the Nationals as they considered the Liberal Party to be less conservative than the Nationals. The 1996 Southern Highlands state by-election in New South Wales is an example of this when the Nationals candidate Katrina Hodgkinson won the primary vote but was defeated after preferences to Liberal candidate Peta Seaton when Seaton received Labor Party preferences.

=== Bolivia ===
Movimiento al Socialismo (MAS) criticised the registration of Pachakuti Indigenous Movement (MIP) claiming that it was done to split the Indigenist vote in the 2002 general election. The two parties discussed an electoral alliance before both parties were allowed to run. MAS lost by less than 2% to the traditional Revolutionary Nationalist Movement (MNR) while MIP unexpectedly won more than 6%. Combined the two parties had 27.03% compared to the 22.46% of MNR.

=== Bulgaria ===
In 2001, the former tsar of Bulgaria Simeon II founded the NDSV. The NDSV won exactly 50% of the seats (120 out of 240 seats) thus barely missing an outright majority. Similarly named parties "Simeon II" Coalition, "National Union for Tsar Simeon II", "National Union Tsar Kiro" Coalition and "National Movement for New Era" (NDNE) got 3.44%, 1.70%, 0.60% and 0.05% respectively.

In Bulgaria, the so-called "blue parties" or "urban right" which include SDS, DSB, Yes, Bulgaria!, DBG, ENP, Coalition For you Bulgaria and Blue Unity frequently get just above or below the electoral threshold depending on formation of electoral alliances: In the EP election 2007, DSB (4.74%) and SDS (4.35%) were campaigning separately and both fell below the natural electoral of around 5 percent. In 2009 Bulgarian parliamentary election, DSB and SDS ran together as Blue Coalition gaining 6.76 percent. In 2013 Bulgarian parliamentary election, campaigning separately DGB received 3.25 percent, DSB 2.93 percent, SDS 1.37 percent and ENP 0.17 percent, thus all of them failed to cross the threshold this even led to a tie between the former opposition and the parties right of the centre. In the EP election 2014, SDS, DSB and DBG ran as Reformist Bloc gaining 6.45 percent and crossing the electoral threshold, while Blue Unity campaigned separately and did not cross the electoral threshold. In 2017 Bulgarian parliamentary election, SDS and DBG ran as Reformist Bloc gaining 3.14 percent, "Yes, Bulgaria!" received 2.96 percent, DSB 2.54 percent, thus all of them failed to cross the electoral threshold. In the EP election 2019, "Yes, Bulgaria!" and DBG ran together as Democratic Bulgaria and crossed the electoral threshold with 6.15 percent. In November 2021, electoral alliance Democratic Bulgaria crossed electoral threshold with 6.37 percent.

Results of blue parties
| Parties | 2005 | | | | EP 2007 | | | | EP 2009 | | | | 2009 | | | | 2013 | | | | EP 2014 | | | | 2014 | | | | 2017 | | | | EP 2019 | | | | April 2021 | | | | July 2021 | | | | November 2021 | | | | 2022 | | | |
| Parties | Votes | | Seats | | Votes | | Seats | | Votes | | Seats | | Votes | | Seats | | Votes | | Seats | | Votes | | Seats | | Votes | | Seats | | Votes | | Seats | | Votes | | Seats | | Votes | | Seats | | Votes | | Seats | | Votes | | Seats | | Votes | | Seats | |
|---|---|---|---|---|---|---|---|---|---|---|---|---|---|---|---|---|---|---|---|---|---|---|---|---|---|---|---|---|---|---|---|---|---|---|---|---|---|---|---|---|---|---|---|---|---|---|---|---|---|---|---|---|
| DBG | —N/a | | | | | | | | | | | | | | | | 115,190 | 3.25 | 0 | 0.00 | 144,532 | 6.45 | 1 | 5.88 | 291,806 | 8.89 | 23 | 9.58 | 107,407 | 3.14 | 0 | 0.00 | —N/a | | | | | | | | | | | | | | | | | | | |
| ODS/SDS | 280,323 | 7.68 | 20 | 8.33 | 91,871 | 4.74 | 0 | 0.00 | 204,817 | 7.95 | 1 | 5.88 | 285,662 | 6.76 | 15 | 7.18 (Note: proportional seats) | 48,681 | 1.37 | 0 | 0.00 | 144,532 | 6.45 | 1 | 5.88 | 291,806 | 8.89 | 23 | 9.58 | 107,407 | 3.14 | 0 | 0.00 | —N/a | | | | | | | | | | | | | | | | | | | |
| DSB | 234,788 | 6.44 | 17 | 7.08 | 84,350 | 4.35 | 0 | 0.00 | 204,817 | 7.95 | 1 | 5.88 | 285,662 | 6.76 | 15 | 7.18 | 103,638 | 2.93 | 0 | 0.00 | 144,532 | 6.45 | 1 | 5.88 | 291,806 | 8.89 | 23 | 9.58 | 86,984 | 2.54 | 0 | 0.00 | 118,484 | 6.06 | 1 | 5.88 | 302,280 | 9.45 | 27 | 11.25 | 345,331 | 12.64 | 34 | 14.17 | 166,968 | 6.37 | 16 | 6.66 | 186,528 | 7.45 | 20 | 8.33 |
| DB | —N/a | | | | | | | | | | | | | | | | | | | | | | | | | | | | 101,177 | 2.96 | 0 | 0.00 | 118,484 | 6.06 | 1 | 5.88 | 302,280 | 9.45 | 27 | 11.25 | 345,331 | 12.64 | 34 | 14.17 | 166,968 | 6.37 | 16 | 6.66 | 186,528 | 7.45 | 20 | 8.33 |
| ENP | —N/a | | | | | | | | | | | | | | | | 6,143 | 0.17 | 0 | 0.00 | —N/a | | | | 7,234 | 0.22 | 0 | 0.00 | —N/a | | | | 1,855 | 0.09 | 0 | 0.00 | —N/a | | | | | | | | | | | | | | | |
| Blue Unity | —N/a | | | | | | | | | | | | | | | | | | | | 10,786 | 0.48 | 0 | 0.00 | 7,234 | 0.22 | 0 | 0.00 | —N/a | | | | | | | | | | | | | | | | | | | | | | | |
| KtB | —N/a | | | | | | | | | | | | | | | | | | | | | | | | | | | | | | | | | | | | 4,788 | 0.15 | 0 | 0.00 | —N/a | | | | | | | | 5,097 | 0.20 | 0 | 0.00 |
| Total | 515,111 | 14.12 | 37 | 15.42 | 176,221 | 9.09 | 0 | 0.00 | 204,817 | 7.95 | 1 | 5.88 | 285,662 | 6.76 | 15 | 7.18 | 382,699 | 10.08 | 0 | 0.00 | 155,318 | 6.93 | 1 | 5.88 | 299,040 | 9.10 | 23 | 9.58 | 295,568 | 8.62 | 0 | 0.00 | 120,339 | 6.15 | 1 | 5.88 | 307,068 | 9.60 | 27 | 11.25 | 345,331 | 12.64 | 34 | 14.17 | 166,968 | 6.37 | 16 | 6.66 | 191,625 | 7.65 | 20 | 8.33 |
| Source: | CIK | | | | CIK | | | | CIK | | | | CIK | | | | CIK | | | | CIK | | | | CIK | | | | CIK | | | | CIK | | | | CIK | | | | CIK | | | | CIK | | | | CIK | | | |

=== Canada ===
When the cities of Fort William and Port Arthur merged and (in 1969) voted on a name for the new town, the vote was split between the popular choices of "Lakehead" and "The Lakehead", allowing the third option to win, creating the town of Thunder Bay, Ontario.

From 1993 to 2004, the conservative vote in Canada was split between the Progressive Conservatives and the Reform (later the Alliance) Party. That allowed the Liberal Party to win almost all seats in Ontario and to win three successive majority governments.

The 2015 provincial election in Alberta saw the left-wing New Democratic Party win 62% of the seats with 40.6% of the province's popular vote after a division within the right-wing Progressive Conservative Party, which left it with only 27.8% of the vote, and its breakaway movement, the Wildrose Party, with 24.2% of the vote. In 2008, the last election in which the Progressive Conservative Party had been unified, it won 52.72% of the popular vote. The Progressive Conservatives had won every provincial election since the 1971 election, making them the longest-serving provincial government in Canadian history—being in office for 44 years. This was only the fourth change of government in Alberta since Alberta became a province in 1905, and one of the worst defeats a provincial government has suffered in Canada. It also marked the first time in almost 80 years that a left-of-centre political party had formed government in Alberta since the defeat of the United Farmers of Alberta in 1935 and the Depression-era radical monetary reform policies of William Aberhart's Social Credit government. During the 2021 Canadian federal election, it is speculated that the People's Party of Canada might have cost the CPC up to 24 seats.

In Canada, vote splits between the two major left-of-centre parties (Liberals and NDP) assisted the Conservative Party in winning the 2006, 2008, and 2011 federal elections, despite most of the popular vote going to left-wing parties in each race. During the 2022 Ontario General Election, Progressive Conservative Doug Ford won a second term as Premier of the Province of Ontario. The Progressive Conservatives won several ridings due to vote splitting. ONDP and Liberal Party voters combined for 47.8% of votes, whereas Ford emerged victorious with only 40.82% of total votes.

=== Chile ===
In the 2025 Chilean general election, multiple left-wing parties did not join the Unidad por Chile but competed with their own lists, namely the Greens, Regionalists and Humanists, the Popular Ecologist, Animalist, and Humanist Left, the Popular Green Alliance Party, People's Party and Green Ecologist Party. Combined these lists would have won 10% of the vote but only the first list managed to win 3 seats.

Similarly, both Amplitude and Amarillos por Chile endorsed the candidate of Chile Vamos but did not join the coalition and ended up without seats.

Examples of vote-splitting

Valparaíso Region in the 2017 election
| Coalition | /1 | /2 | /3 |
|---|---|---|---|
| Chile Vamos | 244,623 (1) | 122,311.5 (3) | 81,541 |
| with Amplitude | 287,173 (1) | 143,586.5 (3) | 95,724.33 (5) |
| The Force of Majority | 182,799 (2) | 91,399.5 (5) | —N/a |
| Frente Amplio | 96,394 (4) | 48,197 | —N/a |

District 5 in the 2025 election
| Coalition | /1 | /2 | /3 | /4 |
|---|---|---|---|---|
| Unidad por Chile | 161,027 (1) | 80,513.5 (2) | 53,675.67 (6) | 40,256.75 (7) |
| Chile Vamos | 76,051 (4) | 38,025.5 | —N/a | —N/a |
| with Amarillos | 118,601 (2) | 53,600.5 (7) (Note: Amarillos polled above National Renewal thus would have won the seat.) | —N/a | —N/a |
| Change for Chile | 76,992 (3) | 38,496 | —N/a | —N/a |
| Party of the People | 64,845 (5) | 32,422.5 | —N/a | —N/a |

District 20 in the 2025 election
| Coalition | /1 | /2 | /3 | /4 |
|---|---|---|---|---|
| Change for Chile | 154,584 (1) | 77,292 (5) | 51,528 (7) | 38,646 |
| Unidad por Chile | 128,105 (2) | 64,052.5 (6) | 42,701.67 | —N/a |
| VRH | 40,221 | —N/a | —N/a | —N/a |
| Green Ecologist Party | 40,177 | —N/a | —N/a | —N/a |
| Popular Ecologist Left | 32,350 | —N/a | —N/a | —N/a |
| combined | 112,748 (3) | 53,600.5 (8) | —N/a | —N/a |
| Chile Vamos | 98,546 (3) | 49,273 (8) | —N/a | —N/a |
| Party of the People | 78,461 (4) | 39,230.5 | —N/a | —N/a |

italic: seats effected by vote-splitting

=== Czech Republic ===
After Independents disintegrated, their MEPs Vladimír Železný and Jana Bobošíková ran for Libertas and Sovereignty - Jana Bobošíková Bloc, alongside Party of Free Citizens three eurosceptic and Klausist lists ran in the election splitting the vote.

In 2021, Přísaha (4.68%), ČSSD (4.65%) and KSČM (3.60%) all failed to cross the 5 percent threshold, thus allowing a coalition of Spolu and PaS. This was also the first time that neither ČSSD nor KSČM had representation in parliament since 1992.

=== Egypt ===
In the 2012 Egyptian presidential election, held using the two-round system, vote-splitting among three leading moderate, non-Islamist candidates caused them all to be eliminated in the first round. This allowed the two more polarizing candidates, Mohamed Morsi and Ahmed Shafik, to advance to the runoff, despite pre-election polls suggesting the eliminated moderates would have defeated either finalist in a head-to-head contest. This led to the June 2013 Egyptian protests and 2013 Egyptian coup d'état.

=== France ===
In France, the 2002 presidential elections have been cited as a case of the spoiler effect: the numerous left-wing candidates, such as Christiane Taubira and Jean-Pierre Chevènement, both from political parties allied to the French Socialist Party, or the three candidates from Trotskyist parties, which altogether totalled around 20%, have been charged with making Lionel Jospin, the Socialist Party candidate, lose the two-round election in the first round to the benefit of Jean-Marie Le Pen, who was separated from Jospin by only 0.68%. Some also cite the case of some districts in which the moderate right and the far right had more than half of the votes together, but the left still won the election; they accuse the left of profiting from the split. Also in the presidential elections 1969 (with five left-wing candidates which combined had 32%), in 2017 (split between four candidates which had 27% combined) and in 2022 (six left-wing candidates with 32% combined), the left failed to reach the run-off which may be traced back to the number of left-of-centre candidates. Similarly in the 1993 parliamentary election, where the green parties ran against the parties of the presidential majority. This led to many right-wing run-offs and the most right-wing dominated parliament since 1968.

Cases of left-wing vote splitting

1969
| Party | | Candidate | Votes | % |
|---|---|---|---|---|
| UDR | | Georges Pompidou | 10,051,783 | 44.47 |
| Left | PCF | Jacques Duclos | 4,808,285 | 21.27 |
| Left | SFIO | Gaston Defferre | 1,133,222 | 5.01 |
| Left | PSU | Michel Rocard | 816,470 | 3.61 |
| Left | DVG | Louis Ducatel | 286,447 | 1.27 |
| Left | LC | Alain Krivine | 239,104 | 1.06 |
| Left | Total | | 7,283,528 | 32.22 |
| CD | | Alain Poher | 5,268,613 | 23.31 |
Source: Constitutional Council

2002
| Party | | Candidate | Votes | % |
|---|---|---|---|---|
| Left | PS | Lionel Jospin | 4,610,113 | 16.18 |
| Left | LO | Arlette Laguiller | 1,630,045 | 5.72 |
| Left | MDC | Jean-Pierre Chevènement | 1,518,528 | 5.33 |
| Left | LV | Noël Mamère | 1,495,724 | 5.25 |
| Left | LC | Olivier Besancenot | 1,210,562 | 4.25 |
| Left | PCF | Robert Hue | 960,480 | 3.37 |
| Left | PRG | Christiane Taubira | 660,447 | 2.32 |
| Left | PT | Daniel Gluckstein | 132,686 | 0.47 |
| Left | Total | | 12,218,585 | 42.87 |
| RPR | | Jacques Chirac | 5,665,855 | 19.88 |
| FN | | Jean-Marie Le Pen | 4,804,713 | 16.86 |
Source: Constitutional Council

2017
| Party | | Candidate | Votes | % |
|---|---|---|---|---|
| Left | LFI | Jean-Luc Mélenchon | 7,059,951 | 19.58 |
| Left | PS | Benoît Hamon | 2,291,288 | 6.36 |
| Left | NPA | Philippe Poutou | 394,505 | 1.09 |
| Left | LO | Nathalie Arthaud | 232,384 | 0.64 |
| Left | Total | | 9,978,128 | 27.67 |
| LREM | | Emmanuel Macron | 8,656,346 | 24.01 |
| FN | | Marine Le Pen | 7,678,491 | 21.30 |
| LR | | François Fillon | 7,212,995 | 20.01 |
Source: Constitutional Council

2022
| Party | | Candidate | Votes | % |
|---|---|---|---|---|
| Left | LFI | Jean-Luc Mélenchon | 7,712,520 | 21.95 |
| Left | EELV | Yannick Jadot | 1,627,853 | 4.63 |
| Left | PCF | Fabien Roussel | 802,422 | 2.28 |
| Left | PS | Anne Hidalgo | 616,478 | 1.75 |
| Left | NPA | Philippe Poutou | 268,904 | 0.77 |
| Left | LO | Nathalie Arthaud | 197,094 | 0.56 |
| Left | Total | | 11,225,271 | 31.95 |
| LREM | | Emmanuel Macron | 9,783,058 | 27.85 |
| RN | | Marine Le Pen | 8,133,828 | 23.15 |
Source: Minister of the Interior

In the 2023 French Polynesian legislative election, the anti-separatist A here ia Porinetia did not form an alliance with the Tāpura Huiraʻatira allowing the separatist Tāvini Huiraʻatira to win the run-off with just 44%.

In the 2009 European Parliament election, two right-wing sovereignist lists Libertas France and Debout la République (DLR) competed against each other. Libertas and DLR failed to cross 5% threshold in all but one constituency. Similar vote splitting happened between the two (post-)Trotskyist parties New Anticapitalist Party and Lutte Ouvrière. A similar scenario happened in 2019, when after failed negotiations Debout la France–CNIP (the former previously known as DLR), Popular Republican Union (UPR) and The Patriots ran independently and gained 3.5%, 1.2% and 0.6% respectively thus falling below the newly introduced national threshold of 5%.

=== Germany ===
In the German presidential election of 1925, Communist Ernst Thälmann refused to withdraw his candidacy although it was extremely unlikely that he would have won, and the leadership of the Communist International urged him not to run. In the second (and final) round of balloting, Thälmann shared 1,931,151 votes (6.4%). Centre Party candidate Wilhelm Marx, backed by pro-republican parties, won 13,751,605 (45.3%). The right-wing candidate Paul von Hindenburg won 14,655,641 votes (48.3%). If most of Thälmann's supporters had voted for Marx, he likely would have won the election. That election had great significance because after 1930, Hindenburg increasingly favoured authoritarian means of government, and in 1933, he was persuaded by Franz von Papen to appoint Adolf Hitler to the chancellorship. Hindenburg's death the following year gave Hitler unchecked control of the German government.

In the 1990 German federal election, the Western Greens did not meet the threshold, which was applied separately for former East and West Germany. The Greens could not take advantage of this, because the "Alliance 90" (which had absorbed the East German Greens) ran separately from "The Greens" in the West. Together, they would have narrowly passed the 5.0 percent threshold (West: 4.8%, East: 6.2%). The Western Greens returned to the Bundestag in 1994.

In the 2013 German federal election, the FDP, in Parliament since 1949, received only 4.8 percent of the list vote, and won no single district, excluding the party altogether. This, along with the failure of the right-wing eurosceptic party AfD (4.7%), gave a left-wing majority in Parliament despite a center-right majority of votes (CDU/CSU itself fell short of an absolute majority by just 5 seats). As a result, Merkel's CDU/CSU formed a grand coalition with the SPD.

Klimaliste has been accused of splitting the vote which would have gone to Alliance 90/The Greens. For example, in the 2021 Baden-Württemberg state election a Red-Green coalition was just a single seat short of a majority while Klimaliste missed the threshold with receiving 0.9% of the vote.

=== Greece ===
In Greece, Antonis Samaras was the Minister for Foreign Affairs for the liberal conservative government of New Democracy under Prime Minister Konstantinos Mitsotakis but ended up leaving and founding the national conservative Political Spring in response to the Macedonia naming dispute, resulting in the 1993 Greek legislative election where PASOK won with its leader Andreas Papandreou making a successful political comeback, which was considered to be responsible for the Greek government debt crisis.

=== Guatemala ===
In 2019 the different parties to the left of National Unity of Hope (Semilla, Winaq, MLP, URNG, EG, CPO-CRD and Libre) ran with their own lists and presidential candidates. Their highest candidates Thelma Cabrera and Manuel Villacorta archived 10.3% and 5.2% respectively, combined stronger than the main conservative candidate Alejandro Giammattei 13.9% (who was elected in the run-off). If they ran together there wont have been any conservative candidate in the run-off. A similar scenario happened in the 2023 election, in which four right-of-centre candidates (Manuel Conde, Armando Castillo, Edmond Mulet and Zury Ríos) gained just below 11% each, all behind Semilla's candidate Bernardo Arévalo with around 16%.

=== Hungary ===
In the 2014 parliamentary election small Social Democratic Hungarian Civic Party won 278 votes in Budapest 12 and 128 votes in Budapest 15. If they voted Left Unity in one of these constituencies instead, Fidesz–KDNP would have lost their super-majority.

Before the 2018 parliamentary election, there were calls for a united opposition alliance including of LMP and far-right Jobbik which were not part of the Left Unity. Only in some constituencies, there were joint candidates.

=== Israel ===
In 1981, three Arab lists competed: the Muslim-Druze-led United Arab List, Christian-led Arab Citizens' List and the Bedouin-led Arab Citizens' List, all of them falling below the 1% threshold.

In April 2019, among the 3 lists representing right-wing to far-right Zionism and supportive of Netanyahu, only one crossed the threshold the right-wing government had increased to 3.25 percent: the Union of the Right-Wing Parties with 3.70 percent, while future Prime Minister Bennett's New Right narrowly failed at 3.22 percent, and Zehut only 2.74 percent, destroying Netanyahu's chances of another majority, and leading to snap elections in September and a political gridlock lasting three years. The former two would unite as Yamina while Zehut withdrew after a deal with Netanyahu. Nevertheless, the National camp failed to win a majority.

=== Italy ===
Sicily is traditionally dominated by the centre-right but in the 2012 Sicilian regional election the centre-right was split between Nello Musumeci, Gianfranco Micciché, Mariano Ferro and Cateno De Luca allowing the centre-left Rosario Crocetta to win the election with just 30.5%.

The Italian Left often struggled to meet thresholds after the formation of the Democratic Party, in 2008 most left-wing parties ran on the Rainbow Left list which got 3.08% but other left-wing parties, the Workers' Communist Party (PCL) with 0.57%, the Critical Left with 0.46% and the Communist Alternative Party (PdAC) with 0.01%, still split enough votes from them to fall below the 4% threshold. In 2009 three different left-wing lists competed against each other. The Federation of the Left got 3.39%, Left and Freedom got 3.13% and the PCL got 0.54%, thus all fell short of the 4% threshold. Similarly in 2019, Green Europe got 2.32% and The Left got 1.75%.

Results of left-wing parties in Italy since 2008

2008
| Party | Votes | % | Seats | % |
|---|---|---|---|---|
4% threshold
| Rainbow Left (PRC–PdCI–FdV–SD) | 1,124,298 | 3.08 | —N/a | |
| Workers' Communist Party | 208,296 | 0.57 | —N/a | |
| Communist Alternative Party | 1,993 | 0.01 | —N/a | |
| Total | 1,501,510 | 4.12 | 0 | 0.00 |
Source: Ministry of the Interior

2018
| Party | Votes | % | Seats | % |
|---|---|---|---|---|
| Free and Equal (SI–Pos) | 1,114,799 | 3.39 | 14 | 3.62 |
3% threshold
| Power to the People (PRC–PCI–DA) | 372,179 | 1.13 | —N/a | |
| Italy Europe Together (FdV–AC) | 190,601 | 0.58 | —N/a | |
| For a Revolutionary Left (PCL–SCR) | 29,364 | 0.09 | —N/a | |
| People's List for the Constitution (AC) | 9,921 | 0.03 | —N/a | |
| Total | 1,716,864 | 5.23 | 14 | 3.62 |
Source: Ministry of the Interior

2009
| Party | Votes | % | Seats | % |
|---|---|---|---|---|
4% threshold
| Federation of the Left (PRC–PdCI) | 1,037,862 | 3.39 | —N/a | |
| Left and Freedom (FdV–SD–MpS) | 957,822 | 3.13 | —N/a | |
| Workers' Communist Party | 166,531 | 0.54 | —N/a | |
| Total | 2,162,215 | 7.06 | 0 | 0.00 |
Source: Ministry of the Interior

2019
| Party | Votes | % | Seats | % |
|---|---|---|---|---|
4% threshold
| Green Europe (FdV–Pos) | 621,492 | 2.32 | —N/a | |
| The Left (SI–PRC–AET) | 469,943 | 1.75 | —N/a | |
| Total | 1,091,435 | 4.07 | 0 | 0.00 |
Source: Ministry of the Interior

2013
| Party | Votes | % | Seats | % |
|---|---|---|---|---|
| Left Ecology Freedom | 1,089,231 | 3.20 | 37 (Note: Won through the majority bonus for Italia. Bene Comune.) | 6.00 |
4% threshold
| Civil Revolution (PRC–PdCI–FdV–AC) | 765,189 | 2.25 | —N/a | |
| Workers' Communist Party | 89,643 | 0.26 | —N/a | |
| Communist Alternative Party | 5,196 | 0.02 | —N/a | |
| Atheist Democracy | 598 | 0.00 | —N/a | |
| Total | 1,949,857 | 5.73 | 37 | 6.00 |
Source: Ministry of the Interior

2022
| Party | Votes | % | Seats | % |
|---|---|---|---|---|
| Greens and Left Alliance (SI–EV–Pos) | 1,021,808 | 3.64 | 11 | 4.49 |
3% threshold
| People's Union (PaP–PRC–DemA) | 403,149 | 1.43 | —N/a | |
| Italian Communist Party | 24,549 | 0.09 | —N/a | |
| Total | 1,449,506 | 5.16 | 11 | 4.49 |
Source: Ministry of the Interior

2014
| Party | Votes | % | Seats | % |
|---|---|---|---|---|
| The Other Europe (SEL–PRC–AC) | 1,108,457 | 4.03 | 3 | 4.11 |
4% threshold
| European Greens – Green Italia (FdV) | 250,102 | 0.91 | —N/a | |
| Total | 1,358,559 | 4.94 | 3 | 4.11 |
Source: Ministry of the Interior

2024
| Party | Votes | % | Seats | % |
|---|---|---|---|---|
| Greens and Left Alliance (SI–EV) | 1,588,168 | 6.78 | 6 | 7.89 |
3% threshold
| Peace Land Dignity (PRC–MERA25) | 517,725 | 2.21 | —N/a | |
| Total | 2,105,893 | 8.99 | 6 | 7.89 |
Source: Ministry of the Interior

=== Latvia ===
Since the decline Social Democratic Party "Harmony", the Russian vote is split among different parties. In the 2022 election, only For Stability! passed the threshold with 6.80%; while Harmony (4.81%), Latvian Russian Union (3.63%) and Sovereign Power (3.24%) all failed to do so. A similar scenario happened in the 2024 European Parliament election, when only Harmony won a MEP with 7.13% and the other Russian-dominated parties Sovereign Power with 2.62%, Alliance of Young Latvians with 2.13%, For Stability! with 1.98% and Centre Party with 1.72% did not cross the 5% threshold.

=== Moldova ===
Observers meant that the creation of the Communist Reformers Party of Moldova had the only purpose to weaken the Party of Communists of the Republic of Moldova (PCRM) in the parliamentary elections of 30 November 2014. The party mimicked the logo of PCRM and another list called "Moldova's Choice – Customs Union" (AM–UV) was placed right next to the other main pro-Russian party Party of Socialists of the Republic of Moldova (PSRM). In 2016, a member of the Moldova's Choice – Customs Union bloc adopted the name "Partidul Ruso-Slavon al Moldovei" (lit. 'Russo-Slavic Party of Moldova', PRSM) and unlike other pro-Russian parties it endorsed direct presidential elections and another member, the Social Democratic Party endorsed pro-Western Maia Sandu in the 2016 presidential election. The PCR received 4.92% and AM–UV 3.45% of the votes, but no seats. The four pro-Russian parties 46.36% combined, while the Alliance for European Integration won 45.63% (but 47.19% including the PLR). In April 2015 the PCR was deregistered.

=== New Zealand ===
In the 1984 New Zealand general election, the newly founded New Zealand Party won 12% of the popular vote but failed to win a seat. The vote splitting was a reason why the New Zealand National Party lost the election.

=== Nicaragua ===
Before the 2006 Nicaraguan presidential election, the Nicaraguan Liberal Alliance broke away from the Constitutionalist Liberal Party. This allowed Daniel Ortega to win the election with less than 40%.

=== Norway ===
In 2009, the Liberal Party received 3.9 percent of the votes, below the 4 percent threshold for leveling seats, although still winning two seats. Hence, while right-wing opposition parties won more votes between them than the parties in the governing coalition, the narrow failure of the Liberal Party to cross the threshold kept the governing coalition in power. It crossed the threshold again at the following election with 5.2 percent.

=== Peru ===
In 2016, the leftist vote was spit allowing the right-leaning candidate Pedro Pablo Kuczynski to face far-right candidate Keiko Fujimori in the run-off. Gregorio Santos won more votes than Kuczynski was ahead of Verónika Mendoza.

=== Poland ===
In 2015, the United Left achieved 7.55 percent, which is below the 8 percent threshold for multi-party coalitions. Furthermore, KORWiN only reached 4.76 percent, narrowly missing the 5 percent threshold for individual parties. This allowed the victorious PiS to obtain a majority of seats with 37 percent of the vote. This was the first parliament without left-wing parties represented.

=== Philippines ===
In the 2004 Philippine presidential election, those who were opposed to Gloria Macapagal Arroyo's presidency had their vote split into the four candidates, thereby allowing Arroyo to win. The opposition had film actor Fernando Poe, Jr. as its candidate, but Panfilo Lacson refused to give way and ran as a candidate of a breakaway faction of the Laban ng Demokratikong Pilipino. Arroyo was later accused of vote-rigging.

=== Romania ===
In 2000, the different candidates of the incumbent government got in the Romanian presidential election 11.8% (Stolojan), 9.5% (Isărescu), 6.2% (Frunda) and 3.0% (Roman) respectively. Combined they had more than Corneliu Vadim Tudor of the Greater Romania Party, who got 28.3% in the first round. In 2024, the government ran three candidates who got 19.15% (Marcel Ciolacu), 8.79% (Nicolae Ciucă) and 4.50% (Hunor Kelemen) excluding them from the run-off but in the re-run in 2025, they failed to reach it again despite uniting behind one candidate.

=== Serbia ===
In Serbia, there are often quite a few nationalist and right-wing parties, which compete independently. Since the rise of Aleksandar Vučić's Serbian Progressive Party, which broke away from the Serbian Radical Party in 2008, vote splitting became common among them. The most extreme cases of vote splitting were in 2014, none of the nationalist lists (DSS, SRS, Dveri, Third Serbia, "Patriotic Front" and the Russian Party, a nominally Russian minority party) made it above 4.2% thus neither of them won seats despite having a total of 10.6%. and in 2020, the POKS (2.7%), DJB (2.3%), the DSS (2.2%) and the SRS (2.1%) alongside smaller parties all ended up below the 3% threshold, which was introduced to make it easier for parties after the main opposition alliance called for a boycott. Only the Serbian Patriotic Alliance gained 3.8% in their first and only election.

Results of nationalist parties in Serbia after 2008

2012
| Party | Votes | % | Seats | % |
|---|---|---|---|---|
| Democratic Party | 273,532 | 6.99 | 21 | 8.40 |
5% threshold
| Serbian Radical Party | 180,558 | 4.61 | —N/a | |
| Dveri | 169,590 | 4.33 | —N/a | |
| Total | 623,680 | 15.95 | 21 | 8.40 |
Source: Republican Electoral Commission

2020
| Party | Votes | % | Seats | % |
|---|---|---|---|---|
| Serbian Patriotic Alliance | 123,393 | 3.83 | 11 | 4.40 |
3% threshold
| POKS | 85,888 | 2.67 | —N/a | |
| Enough is Enough | 73,953 | 2.30 | —N/a | |
| BROOM 2020 (DSS–NJS) | 72,085 | 2.24 | —N/a | |
| Serbian Radical Party | 65,954 | 2.05 | —N/a | |
| Serbian Party Oathkeepers | 45,950 | 1.43 | —N/a | |
| Health for the Victory (ZS–BS) | 33,435 | 1.04 | —N/a | |
| Leviathan Movement | 22,691 | 0.70 | —N/a | |
| People's Bloc (NS–NSP) | 7,873 | 0.24 | —N/a | |
| Russian Party | 6,295 | 0.20 | —N/a | |
| Total | 537,517 | 16.70 | 11 | 4.40 |
Source: Republican Electoral Commission

2014
| Party | Votes | % | Seats | % |
|---|---|---|---|---|
5% threshold
| Democratic Party | 152,436 | 4.24 | —N/a | |
| Dveri | 128,458 | 3.58 | —N/a | |
| Serbian Radical Party | 72,303 | 2.01 | —N/a | |
| Third Serbia | 16,206 | 0.45 | —N/a | |
| Russian Party | 6,547 | 0.18 | —N/a | |
| Patriotic Front (SSJ–SSZ) | 4,514 | 0.13 | —N/a | |
| Total | 380,464 | 10.59 | 0 | 0.00 |
Source: Republican Electoral Commission

2022
| Party | Votes | % | Seats | % |
|---|---|---|---|---|
| NADA (NDSS–POKS) | 204,444 | 5.37 | 15 | 6.00 |
| Dveri–POKS | 144,762 | 3.80 | 10 | 4.00 |
| Serbian Party Oathkeepers | 141,227 | 3.71 | 10 | 4.00 |
3% threshold
| Sovereignists (DJB–ZS–ZzS) | 86,362 | 2.27 | —N/a | |
| Serbian Radical Party | 82,066 | 2.16 | —N/a | |
| Stolen Babies | 31,196 | 0.82 | —N/a | |
| Russian Minority Alliance | 9,569 | 0.25 | —N/a | |
| Total | 699,626 | 18.38 | 35 | 14.00 |
Source: Republican Electoral Commission

2016
| Party | Votes | % | Seats | % |
|---|---|---|---|---|
| Serbian Radical Party | 306,052 | 8.10 | 22 | 8.80 |
| Dveri–DSS | 190,530 | 5.04 | 13 | 5.20 |
5% threshold
| Serbian Party Oathkeepers | 27,690 | 0.73 | —N/a | |
| National Alliance (NM–TS) | 17,528 | 0.46 | —N/a | |
| Russian Party | 13,777 | 0.36 | —N/a | |
| For Serbia's Revival | 13,260 | 0.35 | —N/a | |
| Serbo-Russian Movement | 10,016 | 0.27 | —N/a | |
| Total | 578,853 | 15.32 | 35 | 14.00 |
Source: Republican Electoral Commission

2023
| Party | Votes | % | Seats | % |
|---|---|---|---|---|
| NADA (NDSS–POKS) | 191,431 | 5.02 | 13 | 5.20 |
| We–The Voice from the People | 178,830 | 4.69 | 13 | 5.20 |
| Russian Party | 11,369 | 0.30 | 1 | 0.40 |
3% threshold
| National Gathering (Dveri–SSZ) | 105,165 | 2.76 | —N/a | |
| Serbian Radical Party | 55,782 | 1.46 | —N/a | |
| Good Morning Serbia (DJB–OBAP) | 45,079 | 1.18 | —N/a | |
| People's Party | 33,388 | 0.88 | —N/a | |
| Total | 621,044 | 16.25 | 27 | 10.80 |
Source: Republican Electoral Commission

=== Singapore ===
Since Singapore gained independence, many contests had straight fights against one opposition party and multi-cornered contests are less frequent in every election (except in 1968 and 2006), with talks from several opposition parties to avoid such fights in risk of splitting their votes and ensuing People's Action Party's (PAP) winning the constituency, and the risk of losing their election deposit (Note: Per the rules set forth by the Elections Department (ELD), any losing candidates garnering under one-eighth (12.5%) of the valid votes cast in the constituency they contest will result in the forfeiture of the election deposit. The election deposit is multiplied by the number of candidates if they contest in a Group Representation Constituency (GRC), or tripled for Presidential contests.) Below here are some notable scenarios where vote splits are seen among contests:

- 1963 election: All but one of the 51 constituencies had multi-cornered fights, with most of them being the Barisan Sosialis (BS) party and at least one other opposition party. The PAP however, won 37 seats while 92 candidates had their deposits forfeited.
- 1972 election: All but eight of the 65 seats were contested, with 24 being three-way contests with either the BS or Workers' Party (WP) or both, after both parties undergo party renewals. However, all of the contests were won by PAP and 22 candidates had lost their deposits.
- 1992 and 2013 by-elections: Both by-elections saw a four-way contest between the incumbent PAP, one larger opposition party at the time, and two other smaller parties. In both cases, the two smaller parties garnered less than 2% of the votes and subsequently lost their deposits, and in the latter's case, the PAP did not win the by-election (this also occurred in 1981, which was also coincidentally a multi-cornered contest).
- 2011 Presidential election: In another notable scenario of vote splitting, the final results were suggested to be heavily divided between the four presidential candidates, with possibility of vote splitting towards two of the PAP-affiliated candidates (Tan Cheng Bock and Tony Tan), an opposition-affiliated candidate (Tan Jee Say) and a candidate making his political debut (Tan Kin Lian). The results were reportedly close due to a recount, but Tony Tan ultimately won the election at a narrow margin by plurality (under First-past-the-post voting), while Kin Lian had lost his election deposit.
- 2015 election: Three Single Member Constituencies had three-cornered contests, with MacPherson SMC being the most notable case as it the PAP incumbent is up against the WP and National Solidarity Party (NSP); prior to nomination day, NSP pulled out their intention to contest MacPherson but later reversed their decision, citing that they have also contested MacPherson when the ward was part of Marine Parade GRC in 2011, which NSP has also contested. The decision affected the party's reputation and in the election that ensued, NSP's candidate Cheo Chai Chen, would ultimately lose his election deposit. The other two fights were Bukit Batok and Radin Mas SMCs, both of which saw an independent candidate losing their deposits.
- 2020 election: Pasir Ris-Punggol GRC saw its first multi-cornered contest inside a Group Representation Constituency (GRC) in 28 years since 1992, between the Singapore Democratic Alliance who had worked in this constituency since 2006, and the new Peoples Voice (PV). While both opposition parties garnered a respectable number of votes, PV however, fell short of retaining their deposit by just 0.32%.
- 2025 election: Five constituencies saw multi-cornered contests (the most since 1991), four being three-cornered contests and Tampines GRC being the only constituency with a four-cornered contest. A total of 27 candidates, including two parties of five members from both Tampines and Ang Mo Kio GRC, had forfeited their election deposit, the most since post-independence.

=== Slovakia ===
2002. The True Slovak National Party (PSNS) split from Slovak National Party (SNS), and Movement for Democracy (HZD) split from the previously dominant People's Party – Movement for a Democratic Slovakia. All of them failed to cross the 5 percent threshold with PSNS having 3.65 percent, SNS 3.33 percent and HZD 3.26 percent respectively, thus allowing a center-right coalition despite having less than 43 percent of the vote.

In 2016, the Christian Democratic Movement achieved 4.94 percent missing only 0.06 percent votes to reach the threshold after #SIEŤ split from KDH which meant the first absence of the party since the Velvet Revolution and the first democratic elections in 1990.

In 2020, Velvet Revolution in which no party of the Hungarian minority crossed the 5 percent threshold. The vote was split between Hungarian Community Togetherness with 3.9% and Most–Híd with 2.1%.

Before the 2024, Republic broke away from the People's Party Our Slovakia (ĽSNS). Republic received 4.75% and the ĽSNS 0.84%.

=== Slovenia ===
Before the 2022 Slovenian parliamentary election, there were attempts by Let's Connect Slovenia to win Our Country as a partner but they rejected the offers. In the end, both parties failed to cross the 4% threshold with 3.41% and 1.50% respectively.

=== South Korea ===
In 1987, Roh Tae-woo won the South Korean presidential election with just under 36% of the popular vote because his two main liberal rivals split the vote. A similar scenario happened when in 1997 won by just Kim Dae-jung 40.3% because his two main conservative rivals split the vote. A run-off might have changed the outcome of these two and potentially the 2017 election (which saw the liberal Moon Jae-in win with 41%). FairVote pointed out that during the 2022 South Korean presidential election, the progressive candidate Sim Sang-jung result (2.37%) was more than three times the lead of conservative candidate Yoon Suk Yeol (0.73%). In 2025, liberal Lee Jae-myung got 49.42% ahead of conservative Kim Moon-soo with 41.15% but the two conservative candidates combined had 49.49%.

=== Taiwan ===
In the 2000 presidential election in Taiwan, James Soong left Kuomintang (KMT) party and ran as an independent against KMT's candidate Lien Chan. This caused vote-splitting among KMT voters and resulted in victory for Democratic Progressive Party's candidate, Chen Shui-bian. It is the first time in Taiwan history that the KMT did not win a presidential election, and it became the opposition party.

A similar scenario happened in 2024, when after the opposition candidates Hou Yu-ih (KMT) and Ko Wen-je (Taiwan People's Party) failed to reached an agreement, Lai Ching-te (DPP) won with just 40% of the vote.

=== Turkey ===
Regular military coups in the second half of the 20th century led to a situation, where two similar centre-left kemalist parties, the Republican People's Party (CHP) and the Democratic Left Party (DSP), and centre-right kemalist parties, the True Path Party (DYP) and Motherland Party (ANAP), competed against another. In the 2002 general election, the centre-left (CHP, DSP, NTP) got 21.76% and the centre-right (DYP, ANAP, YP, LDP) got 15.89% but because of the split only the CHP and the new Justice and Development Party (AKP) made it above the 10% threshold with the AKP having 66% of the seats with just 34.28% of the vote. Attempts to merge ANAP and DYP before the 2007 election failed and the Democrat Party (the successor of DYP) only won 5.4%.

=== United Kingdom ===
In the 1994 European Elections, Richard Huggett stood as a "Literal Democrat" candidate for the Devon and East Plymouth seat, with the name playing on that of the much larger Liberal Democrats. Huggett took over 10,000 votes, and the Liberal Democrats lost by 700 votes to the Conservative Party. The Registration of Political Parties Act 1998, brought in after the election, introduced a register of political parties and ended the practice of deliberately confusing party descriptions.

In the run up to 2019 UK General Election, the Brexit Party, led by former UKIP leader Nigel Farage, initially put up candidates in 600 seats after a strong showing for the newly formed party in the 2019 European Elections, but days later, he reversed his position after Conservative British Prime Minister Boris Johnson stated that he would not consider an electoral pact with the Brexit Party. That was seen as benefiting the Conservative Party and disadvantaging the Labour Party. Farage later encouraged voters not to vote for the Labour Party in areas that traditionally favoured it but voted to leave in the 2016 EU Membership Referendum but instead to vote tactically. After the Conservatives' decisive victory, it was suggested by some media outlets and political analysts that Farage had acted as "kingmaker" and stalking horse and effectively won the election for the Tories, as Farage's decision avoided splitting the vote.

=== United States ===
Since 1990, the Republican Party's presidential ticket, according to the research cited below, has benefited most from the spoiler effect of the plurality voting system that chooses electors for the electoral college. The year 2000 was an especially clear case when Al Gore would likely have won without vote splitting by one or more of the third-party tickets on the ballot. Which party benefits from a third-party ticket depends on the election and the candidates.

==== President (since 1990) ====
- For the 2016 United States presidential election and 2020 United States presidential election, some analyses have found the impact of third-party candidates possibly only on the margin of victory. Some attribute Biden's election in 2020 to the lack of vote splitting, with studies of 2016 third-party voters showing them much more likely to vote for Biden in 2020.
- In 2000, Al Gore, the Democratic candidate, lost to George W. Bush due to a difference of 537 votes in the state of Florida. Green Party candidate and progressive Ralph Nader received 97,421 votes in Florida on a platform most similar to Gore's. Exit polling and surveys have estimated that around 47% of Nader supporters said they would have voted for Gore if Nader didn't run (21% Bush and 32% neither). Vote splitting has also been called the "Nader Effect" as a result.
- Analysis of surveys and exit poll data from the 1992 presidential election predicts Bill Clinton winning regardless of Ross Perot's campaign though disagreements remain on which candidate lost more votes to Perot.

==== President (before 1970) ====
- In 1968, George Wallace ran for president as the American Independent Party's nominee and was the most recent third-party candidate to win a state. Some analyze that he siphoned away votes from Hubert Humphrey, making it easier for Richard Nixon to win, but this is disputed.
- In 1912, Progressive Party candidate Theodore Roosevelt won almost 700,000 votes more than did the Republican incumbent, William Howard Taft. After Democratic candidate Woodrow Wilson won the election, many Republicans became concerned that Roosevelt might return to split the Republican Party vote again.
- In the 1884 presidential election, the Prohibition Party's presidential nominee, former Republican Governor John St. John, took 147,482 votes, with 25,006 votes coming from New York, where Grover Cleveland defeated James G. Blaine by just 1,149 votes, allowing Cleveland to defeat Blaine in a very close contest (219–182 in the electoral college and a margin of 0.57% in the popular vote). Republicans were so angered by St. John's party switch, which caused their first presidential election defeat since 1856, that on November 27, 1884, an effigy of St. John was burned in Topeka, Kansas in front of a crowd of three thousand people.
- 1844 presidential election was largely seen as being decided by vote splitting. This is because the election came down to New York, which was decided by around 5,000 votes, and where James Birney, another abolitionist, won 15,000 votes, denying Henry Clay the state, and thus, the presidency.

==== Other races ====
- An analysis of 2006 to 2012 general election races in the U.S. found 1.5% were spoiled by third-party candidates, according to Philip Bump.
- In 2008, Democrat Al Franken was elected the junior senator from Minnesota, defeating Norm Coleman by only 0.1%. Independent candidate Dean Barkley received over 15% of the vote, and a 2014 analysis by Time found that without Barkley in the race, Franken would have lost the election to Coleman.
- In the 2010 Hawaii's 1st congressional district special election, Republican Charles Djou won with just 39% of the vote, because Democrats fielded two candidates - Colleen Hanabusa and Ed Case. Djou lost the general election in November, despite a big red wave, making him one of just two incumbent Republicans to lose re-election.
- As a result of the 2011 Wisconsin protests and subsequent recall elections, the Wisconsin Republican Party has encouraged spoiler candidates to run in the recall elections on the Democrat ticket in order to force the Democrats into a primary election. Republicans argued that this would even the playing field in the recalls, as incumbents facing recall did not have the time to campaign due to their work load in the state senate.
- In Maine's 2010 and 2014 gubernatorial elections, Eliot Cutler ran as a left-wing independent. In the 2010 election Paul LePage narrowly defeated him with 218,065 votes to 208,270 votes with the Democratic nominee Libby Mitchell receiving 109,387 votes and possibly spoiling the election for Cutler. However, in 2014 Cutler performed worse and only received 51,518 votes, but it was still greater than the difference between LePage and Mike Michaud causing a possible spoiler effect. These elections and LePage's unpopularity led to Maine adopting ranked choice voting.
- In the 2024 Vermont lieutenant gubernatorial election, John Rodgers won a plurality of the vote, but the Green Mountain Peace and Justice Party likely siphoned votes away from David Zuckerman. While the Green Mountain Peace and Justice Party asked the Vermont Legislature to elect Zuckerman, because liberal candidates won more votes than conservative candidates they ultimately elected Rodgers to be lieutenant governor.
- The Democratic primary for the 2026 New Jersey's 11th congressional district special election saw AIPAC supporting Tahesha Way over Tom Malinowski after he put conditions on US aid to Israel. This allowed the progressive candidate Analilia Mejia to win.

== See also ==
- Decoy list
- Electoral threshold
- Spoiler effect
- Strategic nomination
- Tactical voting
