= Popular Ecologist, Animalist, and Humanist Left =

Popular Ecologist, Animalist, and Humanist Left Izquierda Ecologista Popular Animalista y Humanista
- Abbreviation: IEPAH
- Party presidents: Claudio Ojeda (PH); Iván Carrasco (PI)
- Founded: 20 July 2024 (IEP); 13 August 2025 (IEPAH)
- Preceded by: Dignidad Ahora
- Ideology: Libertarian socialism Eco-socialism; Marxist humanism
- Political position: Left-wing to far-left
- Coalition members: PH, PI, IL, MDP
- Senate: 0 / 50
- Chamber of Deputies: 0 / 155
- Regional boards: 1 / 302
- Mayors: 0 / 345
- Communal Councils: 16 / 2,256

The Popular Ecologist, Animalist, and Humanist Left (Spanish: Izquierda Ecologista Popular Animalista y Humanista; IEPAH), until 2025 known as the Popular Ecologist Left (Spanish: Izquierda Ecologista Popular; IEP), is a Chilean left-wing political coalition formed by the Equality Party, Humanist Party, and other left-wing groups that dissented from the government majority of President Gabriel Boric.The coalition participated in the 2024 regional and municipal elections, and in the 2025 Chilean parliamentary election.

== Background ==
Following the 2021 parliamentary elections, the Dignidad Ahora coalition, and its member parties, Humanist, and Equality parties failed to meet the requirements to maintain their legal status and were therefore dissolved. After these parties regained their legal standing, none of the mayors or members of parliament elected by them rejoined, leaving them without parliamentary or mayoral representation.

After regaining their registration as political parties for 2023 Chilean constitutional referendum, the Humanist and Equality parties participated in the campaign against the proposed constitution, appearing in the electoral ballot under the name "For Chile, Vote Against" (Spanish: Por Chile vota en contra). Similarly, the People's Party, the Popular Green Alliance Party, and Progressive Homeland also registered the "Citizen Unity: Chile Against Abuses" (Spanish: Unidad ciudadana: Chile contra los abusos) campaign to support the "Against" option.

== History ==
=== Popular Ecologist Left ===
To participate in the municipal and regional elections of October 2024, the Humanist, Equality and People's parties, together with the Chilean Communist Party (Proletarian Action) and the Labor Party (the latter two are not registered in the Electoral Service), formed the Popular Ecologist Left coalition, which was presented in front of the Chilean National Museum of Fine Arts on 20 July 2024.

The aim of the coalition party leaders, according to them, was to reach around 10% of the electoral vote, working with the criterion of reaching people who had never voted and preventing the votes from shifting to the far right. But in these elections, the coalition would have received only one regional councillor and sixteen municipal councillors.

=== Popular Ecologist, Animalist, and Humanist Left ===
On 25 July 2025, the coalition relaunched itself to run in the 2025 Chilean parliamentary election, this time in front of the Salvador Allende Monument in Santiago. The coalition included the Humanist Party, the Equality Party, the People's Party, and Popular Green Alliance Party (which had participated in the 2024 elections separately), but not included the Communist Party (Proletarian Action).

On 13 August 2025, the Humanist and Equality parties registered the Popular Ecologist, Animalist, and Humanist Left pact for the 2025 parliamentary election. In the end, the People's and the Popular Green Alliance parties, which had begun negotiations with the Social Green Regionalist Federation and Humanist Action to form their own left-wing list, did not join the coalition.

== Ideology ==
The coalition's declaration contains a fundamental critique of the economic system, aspiring to a Chile "free from exploitation, poverty, humiliation, and injustice." The text advocates for a social order where "the people and the working class, in the full exercise of their sovereignty, guide the destiny of the country." This project's ultimate goal is the achievement of a "social revolution, based on radical and participatory democracy."

The coalition expresses its support for a series of social causes and movements, among which the following stand out:

- The struggle of the "working class to be free from capitalist exploitation and abuse."
- The recovery of common natural resources.
- A "popular feminist and anti-patriarchal perspective," including the guarantee of sexual and reproductive rights.
- The defense of the environment, climate justice, and ecological justice.
- The self-determination of Indigenous peoples.
- Animal rights.
- The struggle for decent housing and the right to the city.
- The defense of human rights and historical memory.

In the international field, the declaration expresses its "full solidarity with the Palestinian people" and its rejection of "imperialist aggression" and "neocolonialist violence".

== Composition ==
The coalition is made up of the following parties:

Party	Abbr.	Ideology	Political position	President
Humanist Party; Partido Humanista	PH	New Humanism; Libertarian socialism Direct democracy	Left-wing	Claudio Ojeda
Equality Party; Partido Igualdad	PI	Socialism of the 21st century Left-wing populism Anti-capitalism	Left-wing	Iván Carrasco

And the following political movements:

Movement	Abbr.	Ideology	Political position
Libertarian Left; Izquierda Libertaria	IL	Libertarian socialism Self-managing socialism Left-wing populism	Left-wing to far-left
People's Democratic Movement; Movimiento Democrático Popular	MDP	Christian socialism Allendism	Left-wing

=== Former members ===
Party	Abbr.	Ideology	Political position	Membership
People's Party; Partido Popular	PH	Socialism; Left-wing populism Socialist feminism	Left-wing	2024–2025
Popular Green Alliance Party; Partido Alianza Verde Popular	PAVP	Animal welfare Green politics Participative democracy	Left-wing	2024–2025
Chilean Communist Party (Proletarian Action); Partido Comunista Chileno (Acción Proletaria)	PC (AP)	Communism; Marxism–Leninism; Stalinism	Far-left	2024

== See also ==
- Humanist Green Alliance, a similar alliance in the 1990s
- similar lists competing in the 2025 election:
  - Green Ecologist Party
  - Greens, Regionalists and Humanists
