= 2024 Chilean municipal elections =

- 26 October 2024–27 October 2024
- Registered: 15,450,377
- Turnout: 84.83%
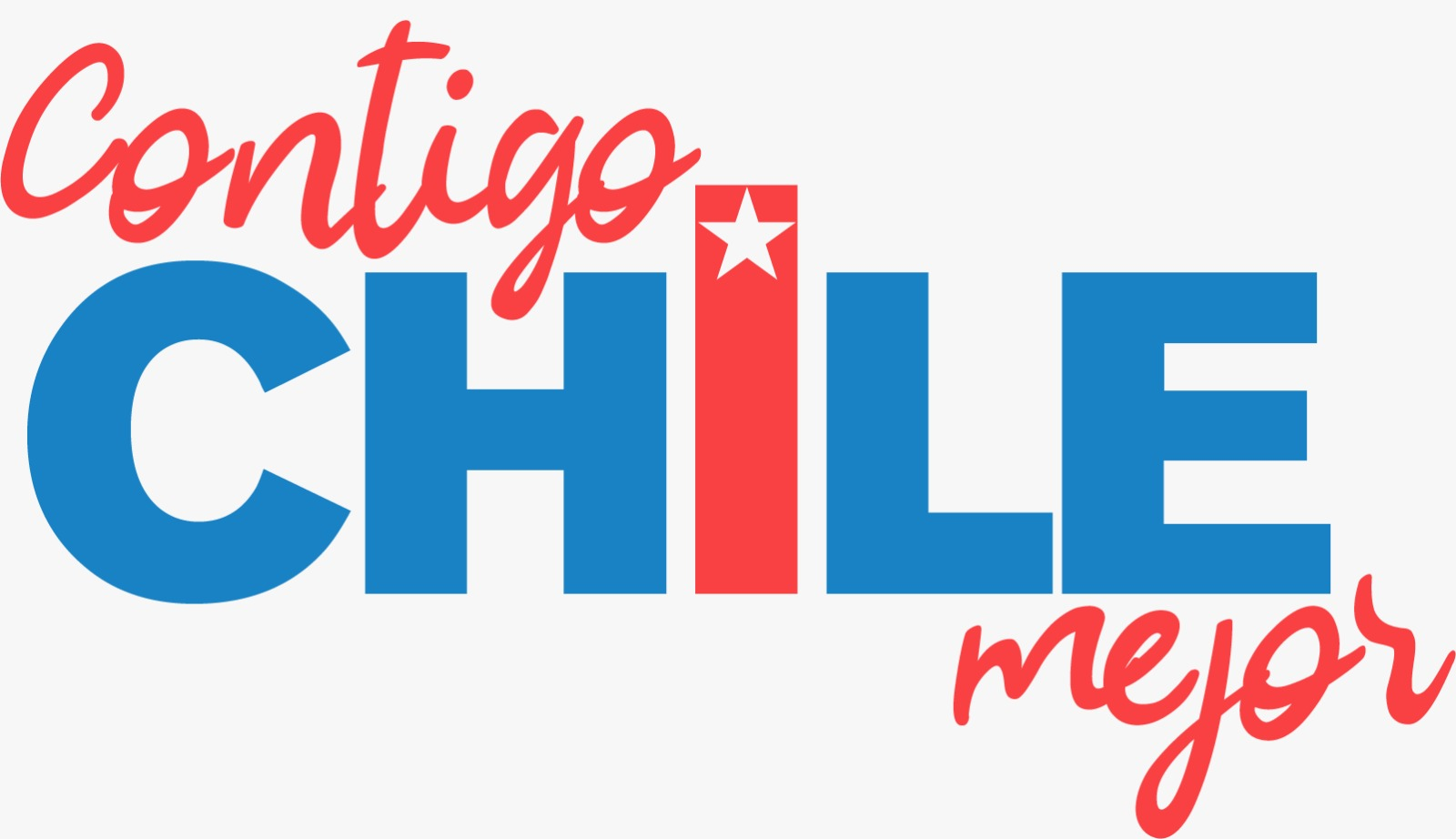

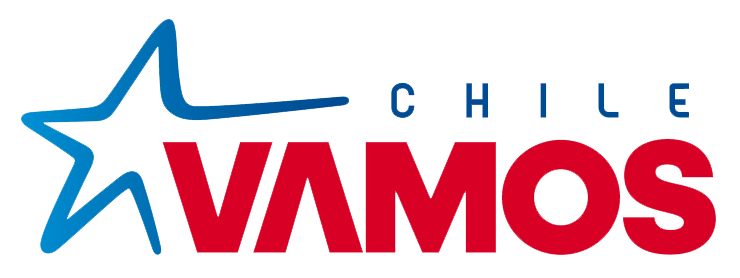

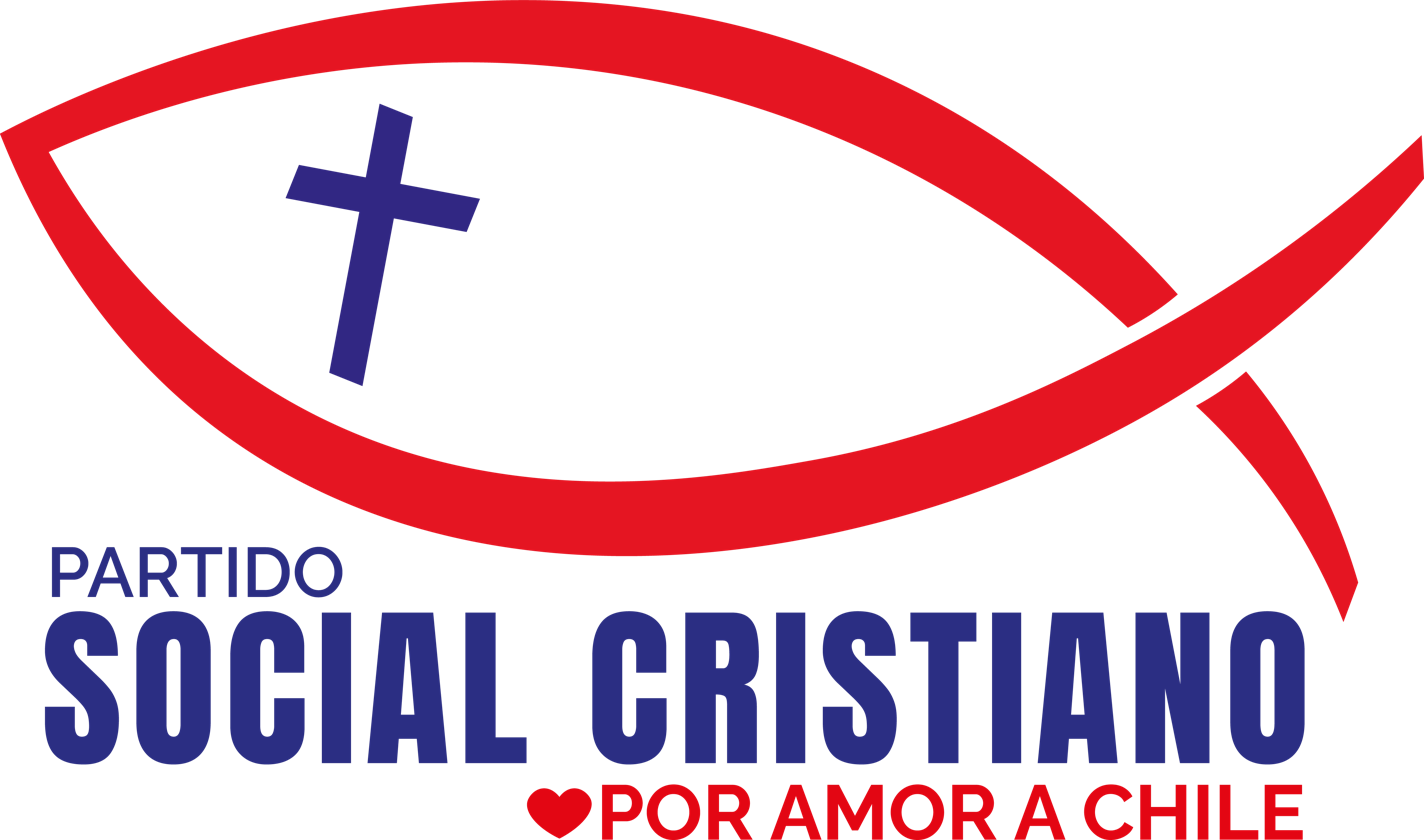
Party	Contigo Chile Mejor	Chile Vamos	Independents
Percentage	30.08	26.55	30.41
Party	Republicans and independents	PSC
Percentage	4.18	3.30

The 2024 Chilean municipal elections were held on 26–27 October 2024 to choose mayors and municipal councillors across Chile's 346 communes.

These elections marked a return to Chile's regular municipal cycle following the COVID-19 pandemic, which had postponed the 2020 vote to 2021. They were the first municipal elections held under Chile's reinstated compulsory voting law.

Voters cast ballots for local and regional offices simultaneously, including regional governors and councillors, as part of Chile's ongoing decentralization reforms. Primary elections to select mayoral and regional governor candidates were held on 9 June 2024.

== Electoral alliances ==
The formation of electoral alliances began in early April 2024, with several coalitions announcing their participation. On 7 April, the parties Amarillos por Chile, Democrats, and Sentido Común joined forces to create the "Centro Democrático" alliance for the municipal elections. The following day, the Christian Social Party registered its own electoral pact with independent candidates, scheduling mayoral primaries in key communes including Independencia and Concepción.

The center-right Chile Vamos coalition, comprising RN, the UDI, and Evópoli, formally registered on 9 April. Their pact included provisions for primaries to select both regional governor and mayoral candidates. For municipal council elections, Chile Vamos initially filed three separate lists—one for each member party alongside independent candidates. However, in a strategic shift the next day, the UDI and Evópoli lists were merged into a single pact with separate sub-sections for each party.

Also on 9 April, the governing coalition's "Contigo Chile Mejor" alliance was registered, bringing together the ruling parties with the Christian Democratic Party. For council elections, the coalition declared four distinct lists to field candidates across different municipalities.

=== Agreed pacts ===
Pact		Party
Mayors	Councillors	Party
B. Popular Ecologist Left		Equality Party
B. Popular Ecologist Left		Humanist Party
B. Popular Ecologist Left		People's Party
F. Social Christian Party and Independents		Christian Social Party
H. Contigo Chile Mejor	A. For Chile, We Continue	Broad Front
H. Contigo Chile Mejor	A. For Chile, We Continue	Communist Party of Chile
H. Contigo Chile Mejor	A. For Chile, We Continue	Humanist Action
H. Contigo Chile Mejor	G. Green Liberals for a Safe Commune	Social Green Regionalist Federation
H. Contigo Chile Mejor	G. Green Liberals for a Safe Commune	Liberal Party of Chile
H. Contigo Chile Mejor	T. Your Radical Commune	Radical Party of Chile
H. Contigo Chile Mejor	U. A Much Better Chile	Socialist Party of Chile
H. Contigo Chile Mejor	U. A Much Better Chile	Party for Democracy
H. Contigo Chile Mejor	U. A Much Better Chile	Christian Democratic Party of Chile
K. Workers' Left and Independents		Revolutionary Workers' Party
P. People's Party and Independents		People's Party
R. Democratic Centre		Amarillos por Chile
R. Democratic Centre		Democrats
X. Ecologists, Animalists and Independents		Popular Green Alliance Party
Y. Republicans and Independents		Republican Party of Chile
Z. Chile Vamos	E. Chile Vamos UDI-Evópoli and Independents	Independent Democratic Union
Z. Chile Vamos	E. Chile Vamos UDI-Evópoli and Independents	Political Evolution
Z. Chile Vamos	I. Chile Vamos Renovación Nacional - Independientes	National Renewal

== Primary results ==
Primary elections to select mayoral and gubernatorial candidates were held on 9 June 2024. The results held by each participating pact were as follows:

Pact/Party	Votes	%	Candidates	Nominees
A. Chile Vamos	112,191		55	20
Independents	66,371	59.16%	27	8
Renovación Nacional	22,868	20.38%	13	6
Unión Demócrata Independiente	17,747	15.82%	9	3
Evolución Política	5,205	4.64%	6	3
B. Contigo Chile Mejor	168,288		152	47
Independents	41,050	24.39%	40	11
Partido Socialista de Chile	33,773	20.07%	23	10
Partido Demócrata Cristiano	22,909	13.61%	19	3
Partido Comunista de Chile	18,011	10.70%	18	5
Partido por la Democracia	12,013	7.14%	14	7
Convergencia Social	9,735	5.78%	6	3
Revolución Democrática	8,448	5.02%	4	1
Partido Radical de Chile	7,557	4.49%	9	2
Federación Regionalista Verde Social	7,274	4.32%	9	2
Partido Liberal de Chile	3,639	2.16%	5	0
Comunes	3,309	1.97%	4	1
Acción Humanista	570	0.34%	1	0
C. Partido Social Cristiano & independents	3,892		2	1
Valid votes	284,371	95.50%		
Null votes	9,255	3.11%		
Blank votes	4,141	1.39%		
Total votes cast	297,767	100.0%		
Source: Electoral Service of Chile.

== Election results ==
=== Nationwide results ===
Preliminary results.

Coalition/Party	Mayors		Councillors	
Coalition/Party	Votes	Seats	Votes	Seats
Contigo Chile Mejor	30.08%	111	41.02%	1,026
Chile Vamos	26.55%	122	28.16%	835
Independents	30.41%	103	0.82%	7
Republicans and independents	4.18%	8	13.81%	233
Christian Social Party	3.30%	1	3.68%	24
People's Party and independents	1.64%	0	2.87%	23
Ecologists, Animalists and Independents	1.43%	0	2.57%	16
Democratic Centre	1.36%	0	4.42%	70
Popular Ecologist Left	0.98%	0	2.51%	17
Workers' Left and Independents	0.08%	0	0.13%	0
Total	100%	345	100%	2,256
Valid votes	11,700,818		10,273,326	
Null votes	899,902		1,689,440	
Blank votes	505,098		1,117,220	
Total votes cast	13,105,818		13,079,986	
Voter turnout	84.83%		84.66%	
Registered voters	15,450,377			

Source: Electoral Service.

=== Results by selected communes ===
The following table lists party control in regional capitals, as well as in communes with an electoral population above 70,000.

Communes	Electors	Incumbent mayor	Political coalition	Elect mayor	Political coalition
Puente Alto	417,443	Germán Codina Powers (RN)	Chile Vamos	Matías Toledo Herrera (IND)	Independent
Maipú	399,170	Tomás Vodanovic Escudero (RD)	Frente Amplio	Tomás Vodanovic Escudero (FA)	Contigo Chile Mejor
Santiago	377,549	Irací Hassler Jacob (PCCh)	Chile Digno, Verde y Soberano	Mario Desbordes Jiménez (RN)	Chile Vamos
Viña del Mar	309,826	Macarena Ripamonti Serrano (RD)	Frente Amplio	Macarena Ripamonti Serrano (FA)	Contigo Chile Mejor
La Florida	309,441	Rodolfo Carter Fernández (IND)	Chile Vamos	Daniel Reyes Morales (IND)	Chile Vamos
Antofagasta	302,465	Jonathan Velásquez Ramírez (IND)	Independent	Sacha Razmilic Burgos (Evópoli)	Chile Vamos
Valparaíso	285,768	Jorge Sharp Fajardo (IND)	Independent	Camila Nieto Hernández (FA)	Contigo Chile Mejor
Las Condes	281,660	Daniela Peñaloza Ramos (UDI)	Chile Vamos	Catalina San Martín Cavada (IND)	Independent
Temuco	248,712	Roberto Neira Aburto (PPD)	Unidad por el Apruebo	Roberto Neira Aburto (IND)	Contigo Chile Mejor
San Bernardo	231,695	Christopher White Bahamondes (PS)	Unidad por el Apruebo	Christopher White Bahamondes (PS)	Contigo Chile Mejor
Ñuñoa	208,845	Cristina Ríos Saavedra (RD)	Frente Amplio	Sebastián Sichel Ramírez (IND)	Chile Vamos
Puerto Montt	206,833	Gervoy Paredes Rojas (PS)	Unidad por el Apruebo	Rodrigo Wainraihgt Galilea (RN)	Chile Vamos
Concepción	202,789	Álvaro Ortiz Vera (PDC)	Unidos por la Dignidad	Héctor Muñoz Uribe (PSC)	Partido Social Cristiano
Rancagua	201,241	Juan Godoy Muñoz (PS)	Unidad por el Apruebo	Raimundo Agliati Marchant (RN)	Chile Vamos
La Serena	196,737	Roberto Jacob Jure (PR)	Unidad por el Apruebo	Daniela Norambuena Borgheresi (RN)	Chile Vamos
Peñalolén	189,187	Carolina Álvarez Salamanca (PDC)	Unidos por la Dignidad	Miguel Concha Manso (FA)	Contigo Chile Mejor
Talca	189,143	Juan Díaz Avendaño (RN)	Chile Vamos	Juan Díaz Avendaño (RN)	Chile Vamos
Coquimbo	188,300	Alí Manouchehri Moghadam (IND)	Independent	Alí Manouchehri Moghadam (IND)	Contigo Chile Mejor
Arica	186,950	Gerardo Espíndola Rojas (PL)	Frente Amplio	Orlando Vargas Pizarro (IND)	Independent
Los Ángeles	174,699	Esteban Krause Salazar (PR)	Unidad por el Apruebo	José Pérez Arriagada (PR)	Contigo Chile Mejor
Pudahuel	174,692	Ítalo Bravo Lizana (Igualdad)	Dignidad Ahora	Ítalo Bravo Lizana (IND)	Contigo Chile Mejor
Providencia	170,588	Evelyn Matthei Fornet (UDI)	Chile Vamos	Jaime Bellolio Avaria (UDI)	Chile Vamos
Iquique	166,485	Mauricio Soria Macchiavello (IND)	Unidad por el Apruebo	Mauricio Soria Macchiavello (IND)	Contigo Chile Mejor
Chillán	160,001	Camilo Benavente Jiménez (PPD)	Unidad por el Apruebo	Camilo Benavente Jiménez (PPD)	Contigo Chile Mejor
Quilicura	151,351	Paulina Bobadilla Navarrete (IND)	Frente Amplio	Paulina Bobadilla Navarrete (IND)	Contigo Chile Mejor
Valdivia	146,610	Carla Amtmann Fecci (RD)	Frente Amplio	Carla Amtmann Fecci (FA)	Contigo Chile Mejor
Osorno	146,257	Emeterio Carrillo Torres (PDC)	Unidos por la Dignidad	Jaime Bertin Valenzuela (IND)	Independent
Quilpué	141,921	Valeria Melipillán Figueroa (CS)	Frente Amplio	Carolina Corti Badia (RN)	Chile Vamos
Recoleta	137,136	Fares Jadue Leiva (PCCh)	Chile Digno, Verde y Soberano	Fares Jadue Leiva (PCCh)	Contigo Chile Mejor
La Pintana	135,853	Claudia Pizarro Peña (PDC)	Unidos por la Dignidad	Claudia Pizarro Peña (PDC)	Contigo Chile Mejor
El Bosque	132,692	Manuel Zúñiga Aguilar (PS)	Unidad por el Apruebo	Manuel Zúñiga Aguilar (PS)	Contigo Chile Mejor
Calama	132,499	Eliecer Chamorro Vargas (FREVS)	Chile Digno, Verde y Soberano	Eliecer Chamorro Vargas (FREVS)	Contigo Chile Mejor
Estación Central	130,938	Felipe Muñoz Vallejos (IND)	Frente Amplio	Felipe Muñoz Vallejos (IND)	Contigo Chile Mejor
Talcahuano	130,312	Henry Campos Coa (UDI)	Chile Vamos	Eduardo Saavedra Bustos (PS)	Contigo Chile Mejor
Copiapó	127,742	Marcos López Rivera (IND)	Unidos por la Dignidad	Maglio Cicardini Neyra (IND)	Independent
Curicó	126,024	Javier Muñoz Riquelme (PDC)	Unidos por la Dignidad	George Bordachar Sotomayor (IND)	Independent
Punta Arenas	123,365	Claudio Radonich Jiménez (RN)	Chile Vamos	Claudio Radonich Jiménez (RN)	Chile Vamos
Renca	114,898	Claudio Castro Salas (IND)	Independent	Claudio Castro Salas (IND)	Independent
San Miguel	113,986	Erika Martínez Osorio (IND)	Frente Amplio	Carol Bown Sepúlveda (UDI)	Chile Vamos
Conchalí	112,718	René de la Vega Fuentes (IND)	Independent	René de la Vega Fuentes (IND)	Independent
Cerro Navia	109,627	Mauro Tamayo Rozas (IND)	Independent	Mauro Tamayo Rozas (IND)	Independent
Villa Alemana	109,103	Javiera Toledo Muñoz (IND)	Independent	Nelson Estay Molina (IND)	Chile Vamos
Colina	105,670	Isabel Valenzuela Ahumada (UDI)	Chile Vamos	Isabel Valenzuela Ahumada (UDI)	Chile Vamos
Melipilla	104,552	Lorena Olavarría Baeza (CS)	Frente Amplio	Paula Gárate Rojas (UDI)	Chile Vamos
Quinta Normal	103,215	Karina Delfino Mussa (PS)	Unidad por el Apruebo	Karina Delfino Mussa (PS)	Contigo Chile Mejor
Macul	100,976	Gonzalo Montoya Riquelme (IND)	Independent	Eduardo Espinoza Gaete (PLR)	Republicanos e Independientes
San Pedro de la Paz	99,736	Javier Guiñez Castro (IND)	Independent	Juan Spoerer Brito (Evópoli)	Chile Vamos
La Granja	98,433	Luis Delpin Aguilar (PDC)	Unidos por la Dignidad	Claudio Arriagada Macaya (IND)	Independent
Ovalle	95,519	Jonathan Acuña Rojas (PDC)	Unidos por la Dignidad	Héctor Vega Campusano (IND)	Independent
Coronel	94,120	Boris Chamorro Rebolledo (IND)	Independent	Boris Chamorro Rebolledo (PS)	Contigo Chile Mejor
Independencia	90,611	Gonzalo Durán Baronti (IND)	Independent	Agustín Iglesias Muñoz (IND)	Chile Vamos
La Reina	89,892	José Palacios Parra (UDI)	Chile Vamos	José Palacios Parra (UDI)	Chile Vamos
Lo Barnechea	89,864	Juan Lira Ibáñez (UDI)	Chile Vamos	Felipe Alessandri Vergara (RN)	Chile Vamos
Pedro Aguirre Cerda	87,786	Luis Astudillo Peiretti (IND)	Independent	Luis Astudillo Peiretti (IND)	Contigo Chile Mejor
Vitacura	87,607	Camila Merino Catalán (Evópoli)	Chile Vamos	Camila Merino Catalán (Evópoli)	Chile Vamos
Buin	86,077	Miguel Araya Lobos (UDI)	Chile Vamos	Miguel Araya Lobos (UDI)	Chile Vamos
Linares	85,094	Mario Meza Vásquez (RN)	Chile Vamos	Mario Meza Vásquez (RN)	Chile Vamos
Lo Espejo	83,708	Javiera Reyes Jara (PCCh)	Chile Digno, Verde y Soberano	Javiera Reyes Jara (PCCh)	Contigo Chile Mejor
Lo Prado	83,459	Maximiliano Ríos Galleguillos (PPD)	Unidad por el Apruebo	Maximiliano Ríos Galleguillos (PPD)	Contigo Chile Mejor
La Cisterna	81,952	Joel Olmos Espinoza (IND)	Independent	Joel Olmos Espinoza (AH)	Contigo Chile Mejor
San Antonio	80,871	María Lizana Sierra (IND)	Independent	Omar Vera Castro (IND)	Independent
San Joaquín	79,967	Cristóbal Labra Bassa (IND)	Independent	Cristóbal Labra Bassa (IND)	Independent
Quillota	79,191	Óscar Calderón Sánchez (IND)	Independent	Luis Mella Gajardo (IND)	Independent
Huechuraba	77,458	Carlos Cuadrado Prats (PPD)	Unidad por el Apruebo	Maximiliano Luksic Lederer (IND)	Chile Vamos
Hualpén	77,423	Miguel Rivera Morales (PPD)	Unidad por el Apruebo	Miguel Rivera Morales (PPD)	Contigo Chile Mejor
San Ramón	75,432	Gustavo Toro Quintana (PDC)	Unidos por la Dignidad	Gustavo Toro Quintana (PDC)	Contigo Chile Mejor
Peñaflor	75,315	Nivaldo Meza Garfia (PDC)	Unidos por la Dignidad	Rodrigo Cornejo Inostroza (UDI)	Chile Vamos
Lampa	73,736	Jonathan Opazo Carrasco (IND)	Independent	Jonathan Opazo Carrasco (IND)	Contigo Chile Mejor
Coyhaique	55,071	Carlos Gatica Villegas (PDC)	Unidos por la Dignidad	Carlos Gatica Villegas (PDC)	Contigo Chile Mejor

== See also ==
- 2024 Chilean regional elections
