= Greens, Regionalists and Humanists =

Greens, Regionalists and Humanists Verdes, Regionalistas y Humanistas
- Abbreviation: VRH
- Party presidents: Flavia Torrealba (FREVS); Tomás Hirsch (AH)
- Founders: Jaime Mulet; Tomás Hirsch
- Founded: 16 August 2025
- Split from: Unidad por Chile
- Ideology: Green politics New humanism Progressivism; Regionalism
- Political position: Left-wing
- Coalition members: FREVS, Humanist Action
- Colours: Green; Orange; Blue
- Senate: 3 / 50
- Chamber of Deputies: 3 / 155

Greens, Regionalists and Humanists (Spanish: Verdes, Regionalistas y Humanistas; VRH) is a Chilean electoral coalition established on 16 August 2025 to contest the 2025 parliamentary election. It is made up of the Social Green Regionalist Federation (FREVS) and Humanist Action (AH), parties that decided to present a separate list from Unidad por Chile, the center-left alliance that brought together the parties that supported the Government of Gabriel Boric.

== History ==
=== Background ===
Deputy Jaime Mulet, who competed in the Unidad por Chile presidential primaries as the FREVS candidate, stated in July 2025 his support for the ruling coalition presenting two lists in the parliamentary election. His idea was contrary to the aspirations of President Gabriel Boric and presidential candidate Jeannette Jara, who supported creating a joint list with all left-wing government parties and the Christian Democratic Party (PDC) to face the right-wing opposition as a united front. When nine-party negotiations failed, Mulet accused larger alliance member parties, such as the Broad Front (FA) and the Communist Party (PCCh), of "excessive demands" regarding the allocation of seats. Deputy and Humanist Action (AH) president Tomás Hirsch supported the FREVS leader's complaints.

The final split occurred on 12 August 2025, when representatives of FREVS and AH announced their withdrawal from the negotiating table and confirmed the creation of a separate list.

=== Formation ===
The list was registered with the Electoral Service (Servel) on 16 August 2025 under the name "Greens, Regionalists, and Humanists." In addition to FREVS and AH, the pact included other political movements such as Transformar Chile of former Valparaíso mayor Jorge Sharp, and the Sovereign Archipelago Movement (MAS). Negotiations to create the list included the People's Party (PP) and the Popular Green Alliance Party (PAVP), but they were ultimately not included in the pact's formalization. The coalition announced that it would nominate 140 candidates across the country.

== Ideology ==
Despite their separation from the Unidad por Chile, both the FREVS and AH confirmed their support for their candidate Jeannette Jara in the 2025 presidential election. Even so, the pact has been described as a "catch-all" alliance due to the heterogeneity of its members. Among the candidates registered on the list was Miguel Ángel Calisto, an independent deputy who, until his 2025 candidacy for the Senate representing the Aysén Region, was close to the Democrats party, which supported the Chile Grande y Unido presidential candidate, Evelyn Matthei. Another VRH candidate is Eugenio Canales, also a candidate for senator for Aysén, who previously publicly expressed his support for the Republican Party candidate, José Antonio Kast.

== Composition ==
The coalition is made up of the following parties:

Party	Abbr.	Ideology	Political position	President
Social Green Regionalist Federation; Federación Regionalista Verde Social	FREVS	Green politics Regionalism; Decentralization	Centre-left	Flavia Torrealba
Humanist Action; Acción Humanista	AH	New Humanism; Libertarian socialism Radical democracy	Left-wing	Tomás Hirsch

== See also ==
- Humanist Green Alliance, a similar alliance in the 1990s
- similar lists competing in the 2025 election:
  - Green Ecologist Party
  - People's Party
  - Popular Ecologist, Animalist, and Humanist Left
  - Popular Green Alliance Party
