= Oscar Guillermo Garretón =

Chilean politician (born 1943)

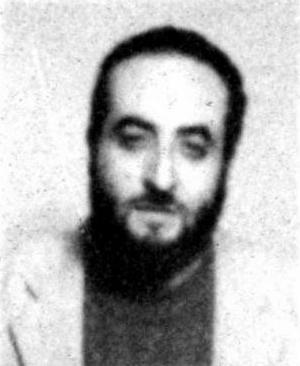

Member of the Chamber of Deputies of Chile
- In office 15 May 1973 – 21 September 1973
- Succeeded by: Dissolution of the Office (1973 Chilean coup d'etat)
- Constituency: 51st Circumscription

Undersecretary of Economy and Tourism
- In office 4 October 1970 – 1972
- Appointed by: Salvador Allende

Personal details
- Born: 14 October 1943 (age 82) Valparaíso, Chile
- Party: Christian Democratic Party; Popular Unitary Action Movement; Party for Democracy; Socialist Party of Chile; Amarillos por Chile
- Spouse: María Virginia Rodríguez
- Children: Three
- Parent(s): Óscar Garretón Señoret; Aída Purcell
- Education: Pontifical Catholic University of Chile (BA)
- Occupation: Politician
- Profession: Economist

Óscar Guillermo Garretón Purcell (born 14 October 1943) is a Chilean politician who served as Undersecretary and Deputy for his country.

Is considered an historic testimony of Popular Unity and President Salvador Allende, whom he supported.
