= Mario Waissbluth =

Mario Daniel Waissbluth Subelman
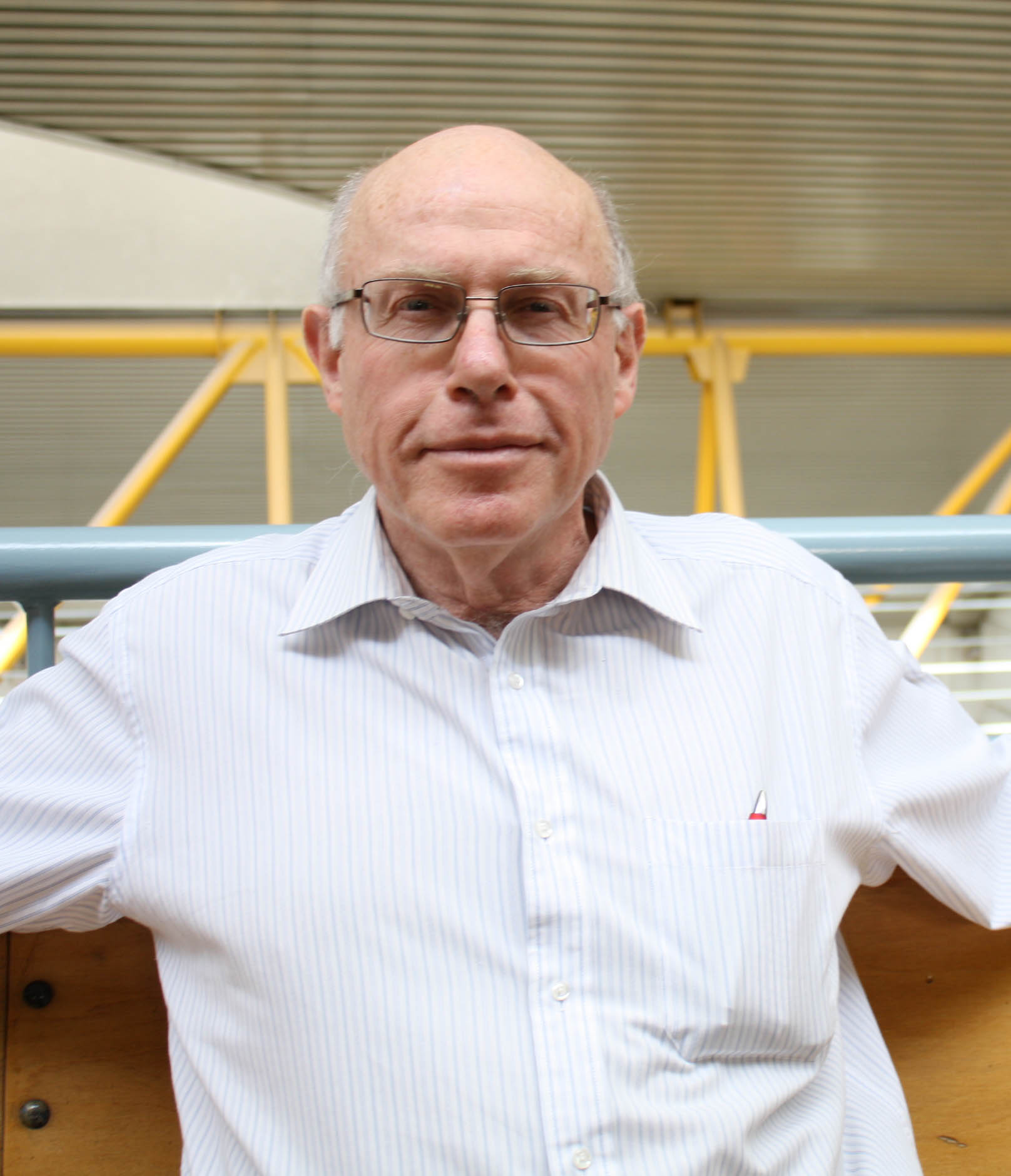
- 2010
- Born: 1948 (age 77–78); Santiago, Chile
- Occupations: Engineer, businessman, politician, university teacher
- Known for: co-founder of Amarillos por Chile
- Political party: Amarillos por Chile

Mario Daniel Waissbluth Subelman (born in Santiago in 1948) is a Chilean engineer, businessman, politician, and university teacher.

He is, together with Cristián Warnken among others, one of the founders of the political party Amarillos por Chile. He was one of the original members of the Consejo de Alta Dirección Pública from 2004 to 2010. He is the founder of the NGO Educación 2020 which was established in 2008 and left in 2018. Waissbluth was a promoter of the "reject" option in the 2022 Chilean national plebiscite.
