= Pamela Figueroa =

Chilean politician

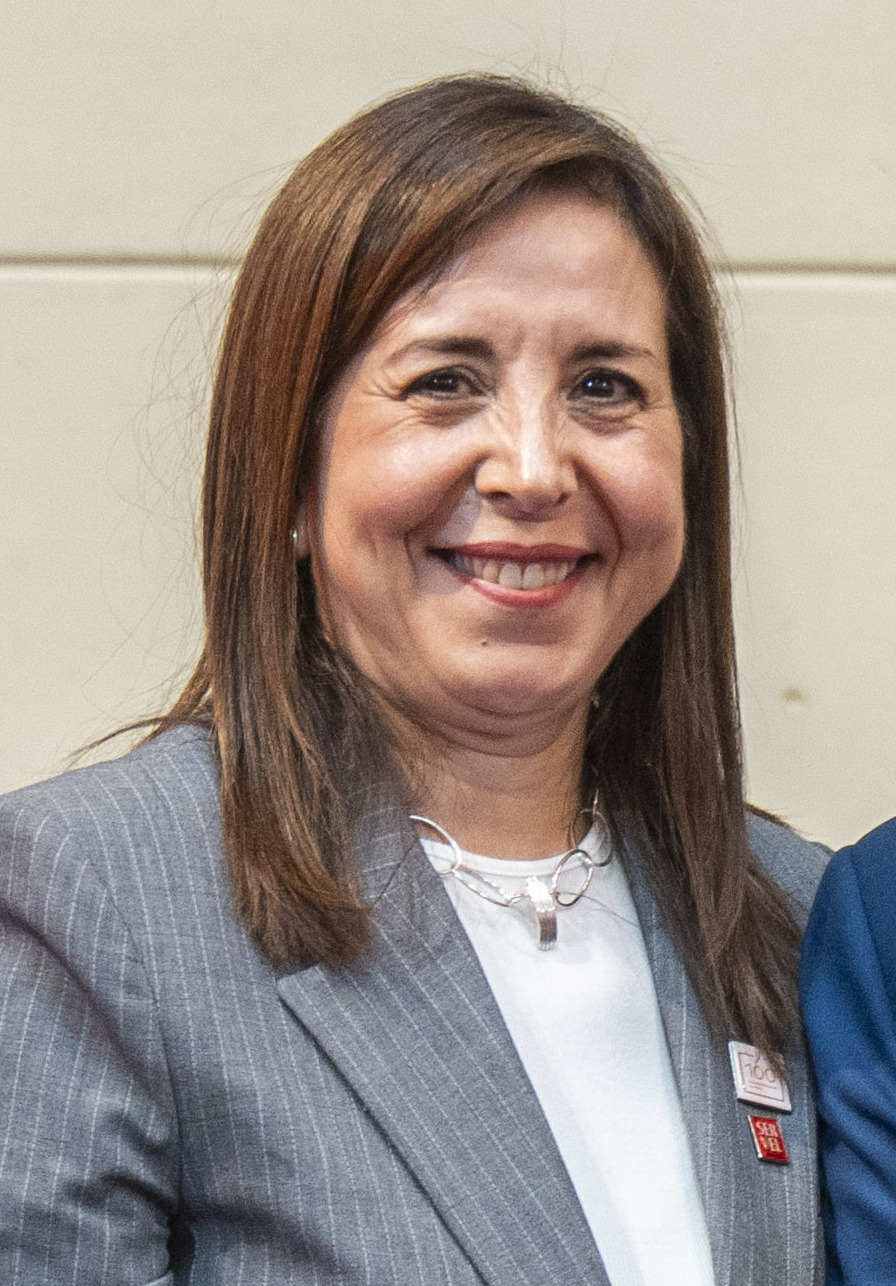
- Education: Universidad Metropolitana de Ciencias de la Educación
- Predecessor: Andrés Tagle
- Political party: Partido por la Democracia (until 2018)
- Parent(s): Gerardo Figueroa Gil; María Rebeca Rubio Palma

Pamela Eugenia Figueroa Rubio (born December 14, 1970) is a Chilean political scientist, academic, and politician, and a former member of the Party for Democracy (PPD).

In 2025, she became the first woman to serve as president of the board of directors of the Chilean Electoral Service (Servel), the public agency in charge of overseeing elections in the country.

== Early life ==
Born in Santiago, Chile, Figueroa graduated from Metropolitan University of Educational Sciences (UMCE) in 1994 as a teacher of History and Geography.

Two years later, she earned a master's degree in political science from the Institute of Political Science at the Pontifical Catholic University of Chile.

In 2001, she obtained a Master of Arts in Latin American Studies from the School of Foreign Service at Georgetown University in United States. In 2019, she completed a PhD in Political and Social American Studies at the Institute of Advanced Studies (IDEA) of the University of Santiago de Chile (Usach).

== Career ==
Figueroa has worked as an academic at the Institute of Advanced Studies of the University of Santiago de Chile and, in parallel, served as academic coordinator of the New Constitution Observatory.

Between 2014 and 2018, during the second government of President Michelle Bachelet, she served as head of the Studies Division of the Ministry General Secretariat of the Presidency. In 2019, she worked as a member of the technical committee of the Chilean constituent process, which defined the drafting and proposal of the constitutional reforms required to hold the election of the constituent convention members, held in April 2021.

In December 2021, Figueroa was nominated by then President Sebastián Piñera as a member of the Board of Directors of the Chilean Electoral Service. Her appointment was approved by the Senate on 19 January 2022.

On 3 January 2025, she was appointed president of Servel's Board of Directors, becoming the first woman to lead Chile's electoral authority.
