= People's Party (Chile) =

Defunct political party in Chile

People's Party Partido Popular
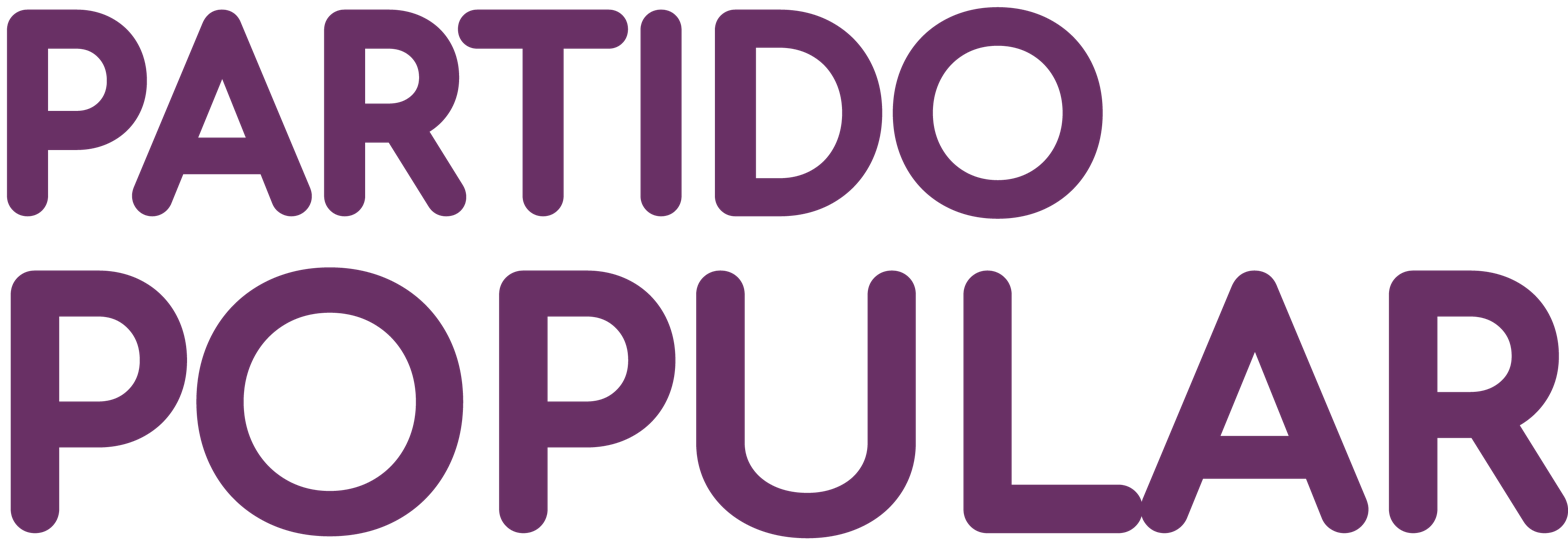
- Abbreviation: Popular
- President: Juan Pablo Sanhueza Tortella
- General Secretary: Felipe Espinosa Alarcón
- Founded: 19 December 2022
- Registered: 3 October 2023
- Dissolved: 12 February 2026
- Split from: Comunes
- Headquarters: Avenida Sucre 2790, Ñuñoa
- Ideology: Socialism; Feminism
- Political position: Left-wing
- Colours: Purple; Red
- Chamber of Deputies: 0 / 155
- Senate: 0 / 43

Website
- partidopopular.cl

The People's Party (Spanish: Partido Popular; Popular) was a left-wing Chilean political party. It was founded by former members of Comunes, a party that belonged to the progressive Broad Front coalition.

== History ==
The People's Party began the process to obtain legal registration before the Electoral Service of Chile (Servel) during the first months of 2023, following its founding meeting held in November 2022 at the headquarters of the Central Autónoma de Trabajadores. Among its supporters were Juan Pablo Sanhueza (president of the first board) and Felipe Parada, who left Comunes in October 2022. Former members of Common Force and the Humanist Party of Chile (PH) also joined, including its former president Octavio González, as well as other Chilean left-wing figures such as trade union leader Cristián Cuevas and Giovanna Grandón, who founded The List of the People.

The party declared itself "not part of the government" of Gabriel Boric, criticizing what they considered a political shift since the 2021 Chilean presidential election in which Boric was elected.

On 29 September 2023, Servel announced that the registration request of The People's Party had been accepted in the regions of Arica y Parinacota, Tarapacá and Antofagasta, after meeting the minimum legal requirement of affiliated members. During the first half of 2024, it was also legalized in the regions of Atacama and Valparaíso.

For the 2023 constitutional plebiscite the party supported the "Against" option, registering for the electoral broadcast alongside the parties Progressive Homeland and the Popular Green Alliance Party under the campaign "Citizen Unity: Chile Against Abuse".

For the 2024 municipal elections the party formed the "People’s Ecologist Left" coalition together with the Equality Party and the Humanist Party of Chile (PH), winning four councillors of its own.

== Leadership ==
Following its First National Meeting in October 2023, the party’s central leadership was headed by Cristian Cuevas, accompanied by Matías Gazmuri as general secretary, Denisse Cáceres as executive secretary, and eight vice-presidents, including former constituent Giovanna Grandón, former Humanist Party president Octavio González, and activists and leaders such as John Parada, Evelyn González and María Jesús Aguilar, among others.

The party also maintains a Supreme Tribunal composed of a president, a vice-president, a secretary, and two additional directors.

== Election results ==
=== Congress elections ===
| Election year | Chamber of Deputies | | | Senate | | | Status |
| Election year | # Votes | % Votes | Seats | # Votes | % Votes | Seats | Status |
|---|---|---|---|---|---|---|---|
| 2025 | 23,365 | 0.22% | 0 / 155 | 2,093 | 0.07% | 0 / 50 | Extra-parliamentary |
