= Jordán Rodas =

Guatemalan lawyer

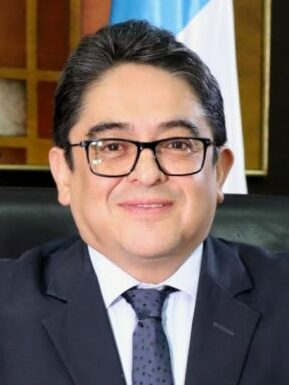
- Official portrait

Ombudsman of Guatemala
- In office 20 August 2017 – 20 August 2022
- Preceded by: Jorge de León Duque
- Succeeded by: José Alejandro Córdova

Personal details
- Born: 25 September 1968 (age 56); Quetzaltenango, Guatemala
- Political party: Movement for the Liberation of Peoples (2022–present); Independent (before 2022)
- Education: University of San Carlos of Guatemala

Augusto Jordán Rodas Andrade (born 25 September 1968) is a Guatemalan attorney and civil servant who from 2017 until 2022 served as Ombudsman of Guatemala, a controversial office in Guatemala's highly polarized political landscape. His 2022 candidacy for the presidency of the San Carlos University was sabotaged, just like his attempt to run, together with Thelma Cabrera, for the 'Movement for the Liberation of the Indigenous Peoples' (MLP) in the 2023 presidential elections.
