= Amarillos por Chile =

Defunct political party in Chile

Yellows for Chile Amarillos por Chile
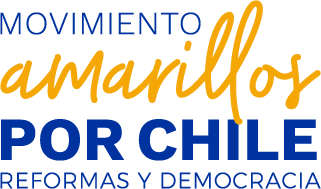
- Abbreviation: AxCh
- President: Andrés Jouannet
- General Secretary: Isidro Solís
- Vice Presidents: Jaime Abedrapo; Pilar Peña; Gonzalo Rojas-May; Lucía Morales; Paola Marín; Fernando Gipoulou
- Prosecretary: Bernardita Soto
- Founder: Cristián Warnken
- Founded: 18 February 2022
- Dissolved: 12 February 2026
- Split from: Party for Democracy; Christian Democratic Party
- Headquarters: Santiago de Chile
- Ideology: Concertacionism; Laguism; Christian humanism Social liberalism Social democracy Catch-all
- Political position: Centre
- Related institutions: Fundación Amarillos por Chile
- Colours: Yellow; Blue
- Slogan: «Reforms and Democracy» (Spanish: «Reformas y Democracia»)
- Chamber of Deputies: 1 / 155
- Senate: 0 / 43

Website
- amarillosxchile.cl

Amarillos por Chile (lit. 'Yellows for Chile'), sometimes written Amarillos x Chile (AxCh), was a political movement and party in Chile. Its members founded the space with the aim of stopping the Constitutional Convention.

It was founded in 2022 by Cristián Warnken and brings together prominent personalities in the country, including businessmen, former parliamentarians, and former politicians from the defunct Concertación coalition, particularly from the Party for Democracy (PPD) and Christian Democratic Party (PDC). The movement emerged as a response to certain proposals of the Convention, which it viewed as "refoundational".

Once established as a party, Amarillos reunited political figures from centre-left and centre-right ―like Mario Waissbluth and Jaime Mañalich―, which installed this organization as a big-tent party focused in the experience of the Concertación (coalition of the Chilean post-dictatorial period) (1988−2013).

== History ==
The movement was born out of columns and letters that Warnken wrote in the radio station Pauta FM and in the newspaper El Mercurio. One such letter, titled "Yellow letter to my children", was published on 27 November 2021. In it, Warnken recounted an incident in Isla Negra where a group of young people yelled "amarillo" and "facho" at him. He drew on the term "amarillo", which had been used in the 1970s to discredit reformists. Patricio Fernández had previously updated the term in a column for The Clinic in July 2018. Warnken's column "Letter to all the yellow bases in the country" was published in Pauta on 6 February 2022, and served as the catalyst for the movement's founding.

On 23 September 2022, Amarillos por Chile presented its founding manifesto as a political party, along with its provisional directive. The first 100 members were also introduced, consisting mainly of former members and politicians from the PPD and PDC. On 21 October 2022, the Electoral Service (Servel) declared the group as "in formation".

=== Dissolution ===
After failing to secure any seats, the party officially announced the start of its dissolution process after not reaching the minimum 5% threshold in the 2025 parliamentary elections. The party leadership stated that, having failed to meet the legal requirements, they were complying with the regulations of the Servel, which prevent the organization from continuing to exist.

== Presidential candidates ==
The following is a list of the presidential candidates supported by Amarillos por Chile. (Information gathered from the Archive of Chilean Elections).

- 2025: Evelyn Matthei

== Election results ==
=== Congress elections ===
Election year	Chamber of Deputies			Senate			Status
Election year	# Votes	% Votes	Seats	# Votes	% Votes	Seats	Status
2025	87,744	0.82%	0 / 155	Did not contest			Extra-parliamentary

== See also ==
List of political parties in Chile
