= Movement for the Liberation of Peoples =

Movement for the Liberation of Peoples Movimiento para la Liberación de los Pueblos
- Abbreviation: MLP
- Leader: Thelma Cabrera
- Secretary-General: Byron Alfredo González Tool
- Founded: 8 December 2016
- Legalised: 21 November 2018
- Dissolved: 8 January 2024
- Split from: Guatemalan National Revolutionary Unity
- Ideology: Indigenismo; Left-wing populism Socialism of the 21st century
- Political position: Left-wing to far-left
- Colors: Red, blue and yellow

The Movement for the Liberation of the Peoples (Spanish: Movimiento para la Liberación de los Pueblos, MLP) was a political party in Guatemala.

== History ==
The movement was registered on December 8, 2016 in the Supreme Electoral Tribunal and its registration process ends on December 7, 2018. The party's general secretary is Byron Alfredo González Tool. It has more than 23,800 members. It is constituted mainly by members of the Peasant Development Committee (Codeca). Its main leaders have been accused of theft of electric power, as well as multiple demonstrations to demand the resignation of President Jimmy Morales. They have claimed that URNG and Winaq do not represent indigenous peoples. On November 21, 2018, the political organization concluded the requirements and was made official as a political party.

== Electoral history ==
=== Presidential elections ===
Election	Candidates		First round		Second round		Status
Election	President	Vice President	Votes	%	Votes	%	Status
2019	Thelma Cabrera	Neftalí López	452,260	10.33 (#4)	—	—	Lost
2023	Thelma Cabrera	Jordán Rodas	—	—	—	—	Disqualified

=== Legislative elections ===
Election	Votes	%	Seats	+/–	Status
2019	121,743	3.02 (#14)	1 / 160	New	Opposition
2023	74,802	1.79 (#17)	0 / 160	▼1	Extra-parliamentary
