= Patricio Fernández Chadwick =

Chilean writer

Patricio Fernández
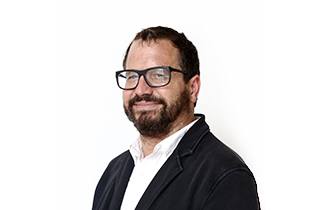

Member of the Constitutional Convention
- In office 4 July 2021 – 4 July 2022
- Constituency: 11th District

Personal details
- Born: 21 September 1969 (age 57) Santiago de Chile, Chile
- Parent(s): Patricio Fernández Barros; María Paula Chadwick Piñera
- Relatives: Herman Chadwick (grandfather)
- Education: Pontifical Catholic University of Chile (BA); University of Florence (MA)
- Occupation: Constituent
- Profession: Journalist

Patricio Fernández Chadwick (born 21 September 1969) is a Chilean writer, journalist, and independent politician. He was the founder of The Clinic newspaper.

He served as a member of the Constitutional Convention from 2021 to 2022, representing the 11th District of the Santiago Metropolitan Region, where he coordinated the Committee on Communications, Information, and Transparency.

Fernández had been chosen by President Gabriel Boric to act as coordinator for the commemoration of the 50th anniversary of the 1973 Chilean coup d'état to be held on September 11, 2023. Following criticism of the Communist Party of Chile that he had made declarations relativizing the coup Fernández resigned from his role as coordinator on July 5, 2023.

== Early life and education ==
Fernández was born on 21 September 1969 in Santiago, Chile. He is the son of Patricio Fernández Barros and María Paula Chadwick Piñera. He is divorced and has two children.

He initially studied law at the University of Chile from 1988 to 1990. He later pursued studies in literature and philosophy at the Pontifical Catholic University of Chile and completed postgraduate studies in Renaissance art history at the University of Florence, Italy.

== Professional career ==
Fernández has worked in various media outlets, including Radio Zero, Vía X, and Canal 13. In 1998, he founded and became editor of the weekly newspaper The Clinic, which he directed for several years.

He is the author of several books, including Cuba: Journey to the End of the Revolution (2018) and On the March: Notes on the Chilean Social Outburst (2020). He has also written opinion columns for international media outlets, including The New York Times.

== Political career ==
Fernández is an independent politician. In 2015, he was appointed a member of the Citizens’ Council of Observers of the constitutional process during the second administration of President Michelle Bachelet.

In the elections held on 15–16 May 2021, he ran as an independent candidate for the Constitutional Convention representing the 11th District of the Santiago Metropolitan Region, on the Liberal Party list within the Lista del Apruebo pact. He was elected with 11,882 votes, corresponding to 3.09% of the valid votes cast.

Within the Convention, he coordinated the Committee on Communications, Information, and Transparency.
