= Cristián Warnken =

Chilean journalist, born 1961

- Born: Cristián Warnken Lihn; 23 January 1961 (age 65); Santiago, Chile
- Education: Pontifical Catholic University of Chile
- Occupations: Literature professor; Radio Host; Television presenter; Interviewer
- Political party: Amarillos por Chile

Cristián Warnken (born January 28, 1961) is a Chilean literature professor, columnist, interviewer, radio personality, podcaster, and television presenter. Similarly, he is the leader of Amarillos por Chile.

In 2020 he interviewed President Sebastián Piñera. Warnken has been dean of the Faculty of Education and Humanities of Universidad del Desarrollo. He was elected as a permanent member of the Academia Chilena de Ciencias Sociales, Políticas y Morales in 2022.
