= Cristián Cuevas (politician) =

Chilean politician

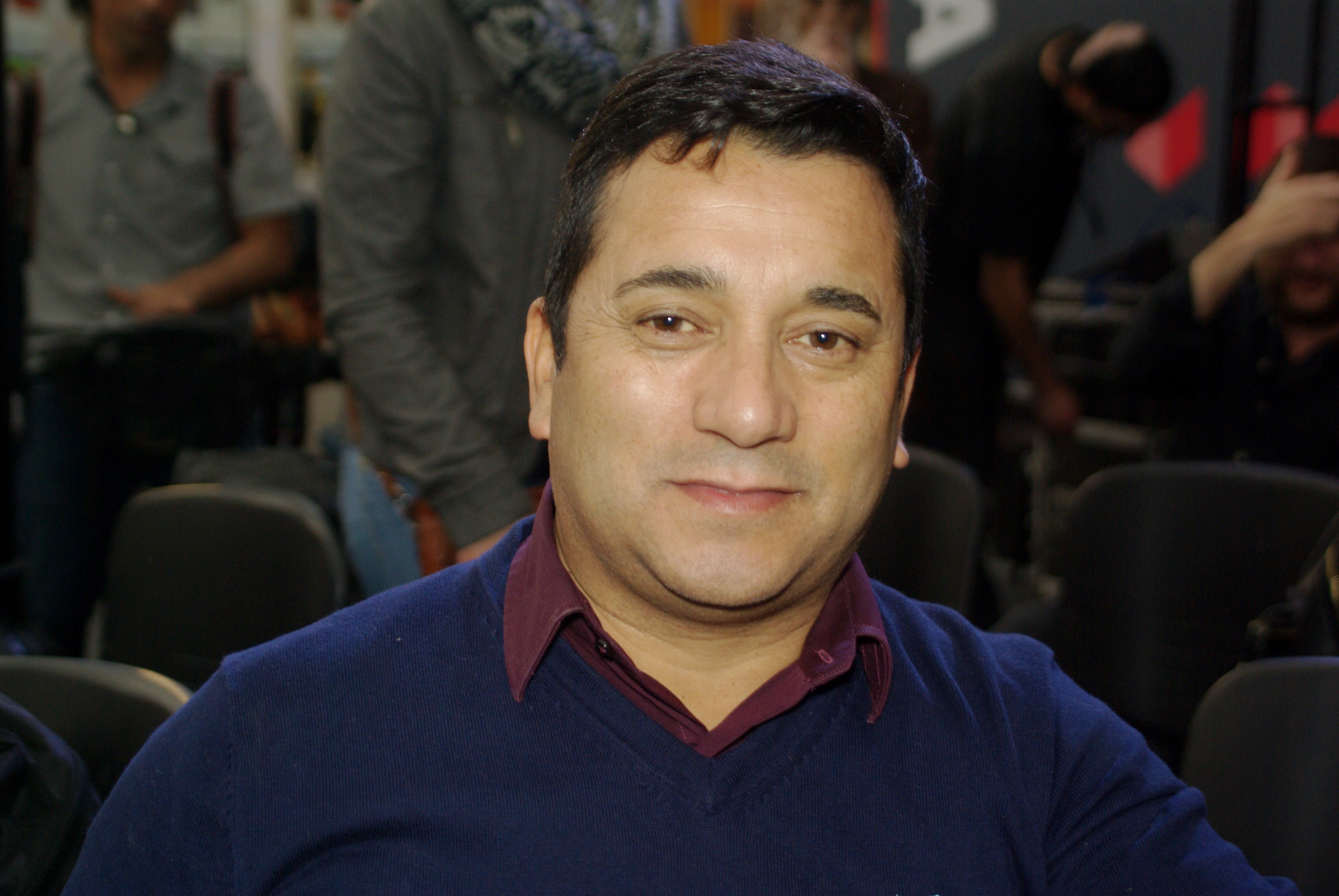

President of the Chilean Confederation of Copper Workers
- In office 2007–2008

Personal details
- Born: 22 March 1969 (age 57) Coronel, Chile
- Party: Socialist Party; Communist Party; Social Convergence
- Other political affiliations: New Democracy (2016−2019); Popular Victory (2019−2021); The List of the People (2021)
- Education: ARCIS University (BA)
- Occupation: Politician
- Profession: Social worker

Cristián Eduardo Cuevas Zambrano (born 22 March 1969) is a Chilean trade unionist and politician.

On 5 August 2021, The List of the People (LdP) announced Cuevas' nomination as presidential candidate for the general election after having won an internal vote, where he obtained 43 of the 76 votes. However, on 10 August, his candidacy was deposed by the proper LdP after their announcement of a public consultation to define a new candidate.

== Early life ==
He is Son of Eleodoro Cuevas, a coal miner, and Benicia Zambrano, Cuevas has ten siblings. By the other hand, he completed the secondary school at the A−49 Lyceé of Coronel for then joining to the career of social work at the ARCIS University.

In 1997, after living in Los Andes for a year, he began his work as a worker at Sodexho Chile, a transnational food company at Minera Andina (property of Codelco), where he worked until 2003.

In March 2008, when he was a union leader of Codelco workers, he referred to his sexual orientation for a first time in an interview for Paula magazine as well as in Punto Final, where he claimed to constantly participate in the gay pride day marches. Similarly, in January 2012, he declared to the supplement El Semanal, of the newspaper La Tercera, that he didn't need to get married because he was «happily accompanied».

== Political career ==
When he was 14, Cuevas began his militancy in the Socialist Party of Chile, where he joined the National Coordinator of Regionals (CNR), an extinct revolutionary fraction in the party.

In 1998, he met Gladys Marín while he was participating in a human rights march. There, according to her statements, she caused him such admiration that he decided to support his presidential candidacy in the 1999–00 elections, reason why he joined the Communist Party of Chile (PC).

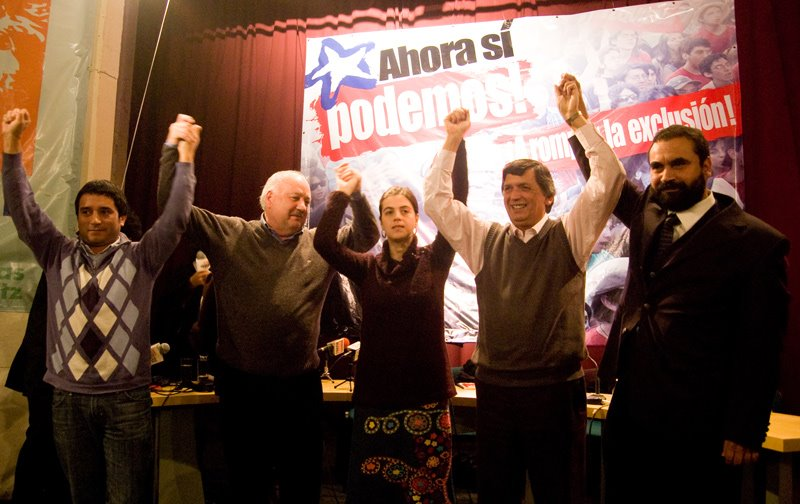
Cuevas (first from left to right) with Chilean Communist Party leaders in 2009.

In the 2009 parliamentary election, the PC proclaimed him in May a candidate for deputy for the 46th district (corresponding to Lota and Arauco Province), but he wasn't elected. In 2013, he ran for the lower chamber again, this time for the 3rd District, but didn't get the position either.

In May 2014, he was appointed labor attaché in Spain by the second government of Michelle Bachelet (2014−2018). Then, on 4 September 2015, he announced his resignation to the PC.

On 4 September 2016, he was a founding member of the movement Nueva Democracia (ND). Thus, ND formed part of the Broad Front when the coalition was established on 21 January 2017 by different left-wing parties and organizations.

In 2019, ND merged with other groups into Social Convergence. However, during the Social outbreak, Cuevas resigned in rejection of Gabriel Boric's participation in the November 15th agreement to draft a new Constitution, which emerged amid massive riots.
