= The Clinic (newspaper) =

Chilean newspaper

- Front page of The Clinic's special edition commemorating the fortieth anniversary of the 1973 Chilean coup d'état, published on 5 September 2013. Front page of The Clinic's special edition commemorating the fortieth anniversary of the 1973 Chilean coup d'état, published on 5 September 2013.
- Type: Weekly newspaper
- Format: Magazine; digital
- Founder: Patricio Fernández Chadwick
- Founded: 1998
- Headquarters: Santiago, Chile
- Website: theclinic.cl

The Clinic is a Chilean news website with a focus on investigative journalism and in-depth reporting. It was formerly a partially satirical newspaper that offered analysis and opinion on politics, culture, and current affairs. It was founded by Patricio Fernández Chadwick in November 1998, and includes a broad mix of cultural criticism, jokes, in-depth interviews, and investigative work. The name was inspired by Chilean dictator Augusto Pinochet's October 1998 arrest in Britain at The London Clinic, which bears the name The Clinic on its façade. In its first incarnation, it was only a few pages long, distributed only within Santiago, and costing 100 pesos (US$0.22 at the time). Over the years, it has changed significantly, and in 2013 cost 1000 pesos (US$1.75 in 2013) and averages forty pages. Currently, it is published every Thursday during normal operation times (except for a short hiatus during February). It published its 499th edition on June 20, 2013, and its 900th edition on October 6, 2022.

== Humor ==
One of its humor features is done in a style reminiscent of Sergio Aragones' marginal cartoons in Mad Magazine: at the bottom of each page (except for the covers), the statement Sabía usted que...( Did you know that...?) is printed and followed by a remark which can be obscene, witty, snarky, or impenetrable, but is always very short. Another hallmark of The Clinic is its "shocking" covers, which often contain near-nudity and photoshopped heads, along with ironic or double-entendre captions.

Examples:

- It's true: marijuana leads to coke, fries, two burgers, three ice creams...
- Ghosts don't believe in people.
- If everybody who says they were there, really was there, the GAP (Armed Personal Guard, an organization established to serve as a paramilitary presidential bodyguard for Salvador Allende) had about 70,000 members.
- To be on the front page of Las Últimas Noticias, (a Chilean tabloid newspaper), all you have to do is bare your butt in a disco.
- Barney is Godzilla's gay son.
- For the cost of a missile, you can make 25,000 envelopes with anthrax.

== Editorial stance ==
The Clinic covers current events from a generally leftist position, showing contempt for almost all other media outlets in the country, and mocking politicians of all stripes, from former military dictator Augusto Pinochet to the late communist leader Gladys Marín.

The Clinic is also critical of what it calls "lazy reporting" and many times it has criticized the centrist and centre-left governments that have ruled Chile since it transitioned to a democratic government.

== See also ==
- List of satirical magazines
