= Thelma Cabrera =

Indigenous human rights defender and politician

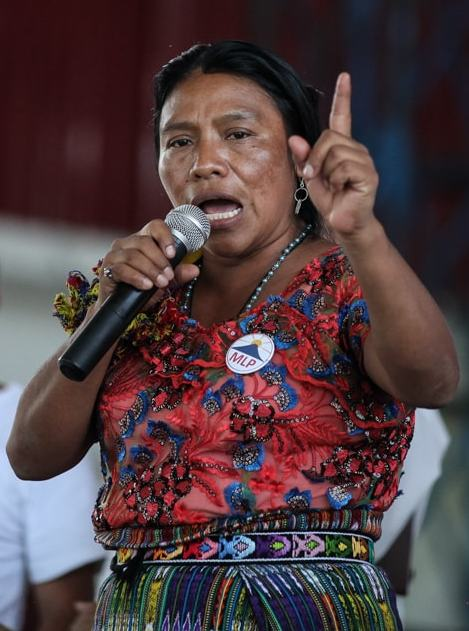
- Cabrera in 2019

Personal details
- Born: 21 September 1970 (age 55) El Asintal, Guatemala
- Party: Movement for the Liberation of Peoples

Thelma Cabrera Pérez de Sánchez (born September 21, 1970) is an Indigenous (Maya Mam) rights activist and politician. Cabrera ran for president of Guatemala in 2019 as part of the political party, Movement for the Liberation of Peoples. She finished fourth in the 2019 election garnering 10.3% of the popular vote, the highest vote total for an indigenous candidate in Guatemalan history.

She attempted to run again in the 2023 election, but was barred from registering, because her running mate, Jordán Rodas, did not supply a letter certifying that no corruption cases are open against him. Other politicians with pending corruption cases were allowed register. Cabrera has not ruled out a presidential run in 2027.

== Early life ==
Born in a poor campesino family, Cabrera grew up in El Asintal on the west coast of Guatemala and married at the age of 15. In her early years, Cabrera worked alongside her parents and siblings harvesting coffee. She did not receive a university education. In an interview with The Guardian, Cabrera described her upbringing, saying, "I came from nothing – from under the rubbish. But for many years I've worked with communities suffering lack of opportunities, undignified wages, migration and violence as a result of structural problems and corruption."

== Political career ==
=== 2019 Presidential campaign ===
Cabrera has been an active member of Peasant Development Committee (Spanish: Comité de Desarrollo Campesino; CODECA), an organization working to improve the situation of the rural poor of Guatemala. Cabrera was selected to represent CODECA's newly formed political party, Movement for the Liberation of Peoples (Spanish: Movimiento para la Liberación de los Pueblos; MLP), to run in the 2019 Guatemalan general election on June 16, 2019. Both the MLP and CODECA have dealt with severe backlash against their campaign for indigenous peoples. Activists and politicians like Cabrera have received death threats throughout their respective campaigns. In 2018, following the formation of the MLP, a member of CODECA's national leadership, Luis Arturo Marroquín was murdered. Seven other members of CODECA and Campesino organizations were murdered between May and June of 2018 leading up to the election.

Cabrera started the race polling fifth in a race with 20 candidates. The only candidate of indigenous and uneducated origin, she was criticized for her lack of academic education, her sometimes awkward Castilian Spanish, and her dress. Despite the population being 60% indigenous, Cabrera was only the second indigenous woman to run for president since Rigoberta Menchu and if elected, she would have been the first ever president that was not a man of Spanish descent.

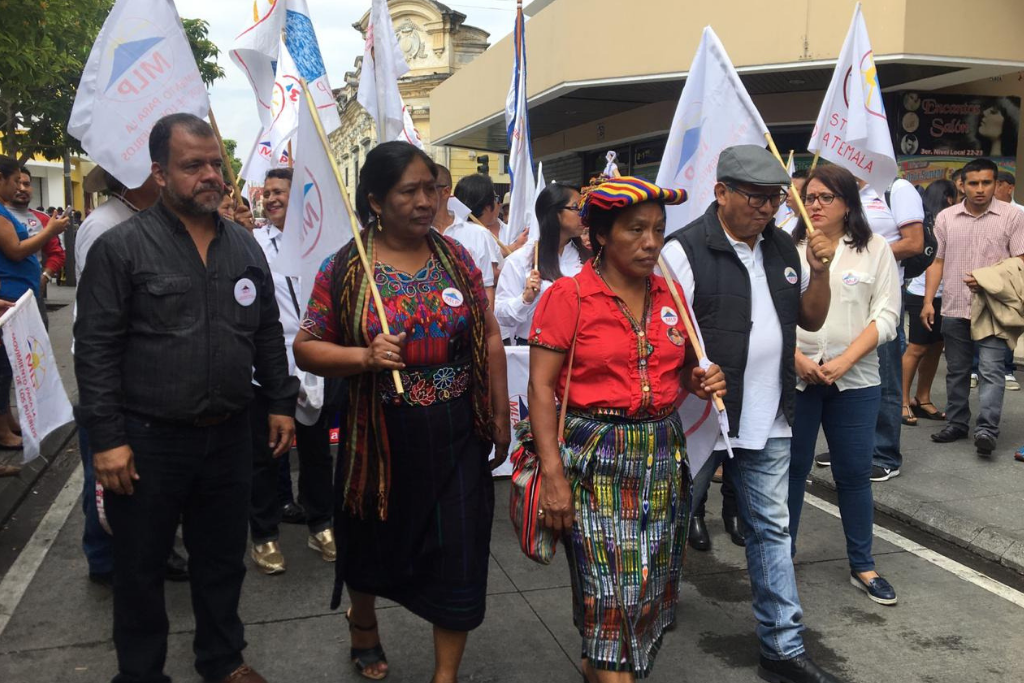
Cabrera leads a protest for indigenous rights and promotion of her 2019 campaign with MLP party.

Her campaign slogan “Yo Elijo Dignidad” or “I Choose Dignity” was chosen as a response to Guatemala’s history of electoral corruption and mistreatment of indigenous peoples. All three of the candidates who finished above Cabrera were embroiled in corruption allegations. Sandra Torres was accused of money laundering and illicit campaign funding, while Alejandro Giammattei faced backlash for his role in the extra judicial executions of 7 prisoners in 2006. Roberto Arzú faced sanctions to pay off multi-million dollar debts owed to his political strategist. Cabrera planned to address corruption by lowering pay for government officials to prevent candidates from participating in politics for the purpose of gaining wealth or bolstering their business connections.

She finished the first round in fourth place, receiving 452,260 votes, or 10.33 percent. Cabrera’s fourth-place finish among the nineteen candidates was the highest finish of any indigenous presidential candidate in Guatemalan history. Her party, the MLP, also elected one representative to congress while seven other representatives were elected from majority indigenous parties. The MLP alleged several irregularities regarding ballots during the race, however, their accusations were rejected and a ballot recount was conducted with no avail.

=== 2023 Presidential election ===
The MLP re-nominated her to represent it in the 2023 presidential election along with Jordán Rodas, former human rights ombudsman, as its vice-presidential candidate. Jordán Rodas has gained international recognition for his fight against impunity during the government of former president Jimmy Morales and the current administration of Alejandro Giammattei. Their candidacy was rejected by the Guatemalan electoral court. The tribunal said Rodas did not supply certification that he had no corruption cases open against him. The court allowed politicians with pending corruption cases to register.

Human rights organizations and international observers criticized the Electoral Tribunal's decision as a political vendetta by President Giammattei. Political scientist and Latin American election expert Daniel Zovatto criticized it as an 'electoral coup'. The election was later won by Semilla candidate Bernardo Arévalo.

=== Later career ===
Cabrera told the Guardian that she thinks most of Bernardo Arévalo’s voters will be disappointed in their vote. His Semilla party won just 23 of the 160 seats, and the judiciary remains in the hands of his political enemies. She said of his rocky transition to power, "They wouldn’t let him assume the presidency just like that...they had to tie his hands very well." Asked about potentially running in the 2027 Guatemalan presidential election, she did not rule it out, and said she would run if nominated.

== Political views ==
Cabrera believes in codifying the rights of Indigenous Guatemalans through constitutional reform that would make Guatemala a plurinational state. Some of her other proposals include increasing representation for indigenous peoples, a more efficient healthcare system, and reversing the privatization of electricity services. Other parts of her platform for Guatemala follow the so-called “Good Living” model adopted by Ecuador and Bolivia. Under this model, political reforms are enacted to encourage education, protect the environment, and ensure access to water and electricity.
