= Popular Green Alliance Party =

Defunct Chilean political party

Popular Green Alliance Party Partido Alianza Verde Popular
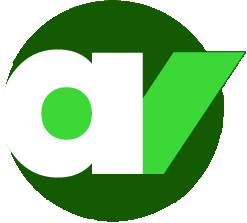
- Abbreviation: PAVP
- President: Carlos Zamora
- Secretary: Fernando Ramírez Valdivia
- Founded: November 7, 2022
- Legalized: August 29, 2023
- Dissolved: February 12, 2026
- Ideology: Animal welfare Animal rights Environmentalism

Website
- alianzaverde.cl

The Popular Green Alliance Party (Spanish: Partido Alianza Verde Popular; PAVP) was a Chilean political party founded in November 2022 and dissolved in February 2026.

During its formation process it was announced as the "first animalist party in Chile". His registration was officially accepted by the Electoral Service in August 2023.

In its declaration of principles, the party defined itself as an environmentalist and defender of sustainability. It also defined as its main objective the reinforcement of the Law on responsible ownership of pets and companion animals, known as the "Cholito Law".

== Election results ==
=== Congress elections ===
Election year	Chamber of Deputies			Senate			Status
Election year	# Votes	% Votes	Seats	# Votes	% Votes	Seats	Status
2025	69,410	0.65%	0 / 155	9,738	0.31%	0 / 50	Extra-parliamentary
