= Electoral Service =

Agency overseeing elections in Chile

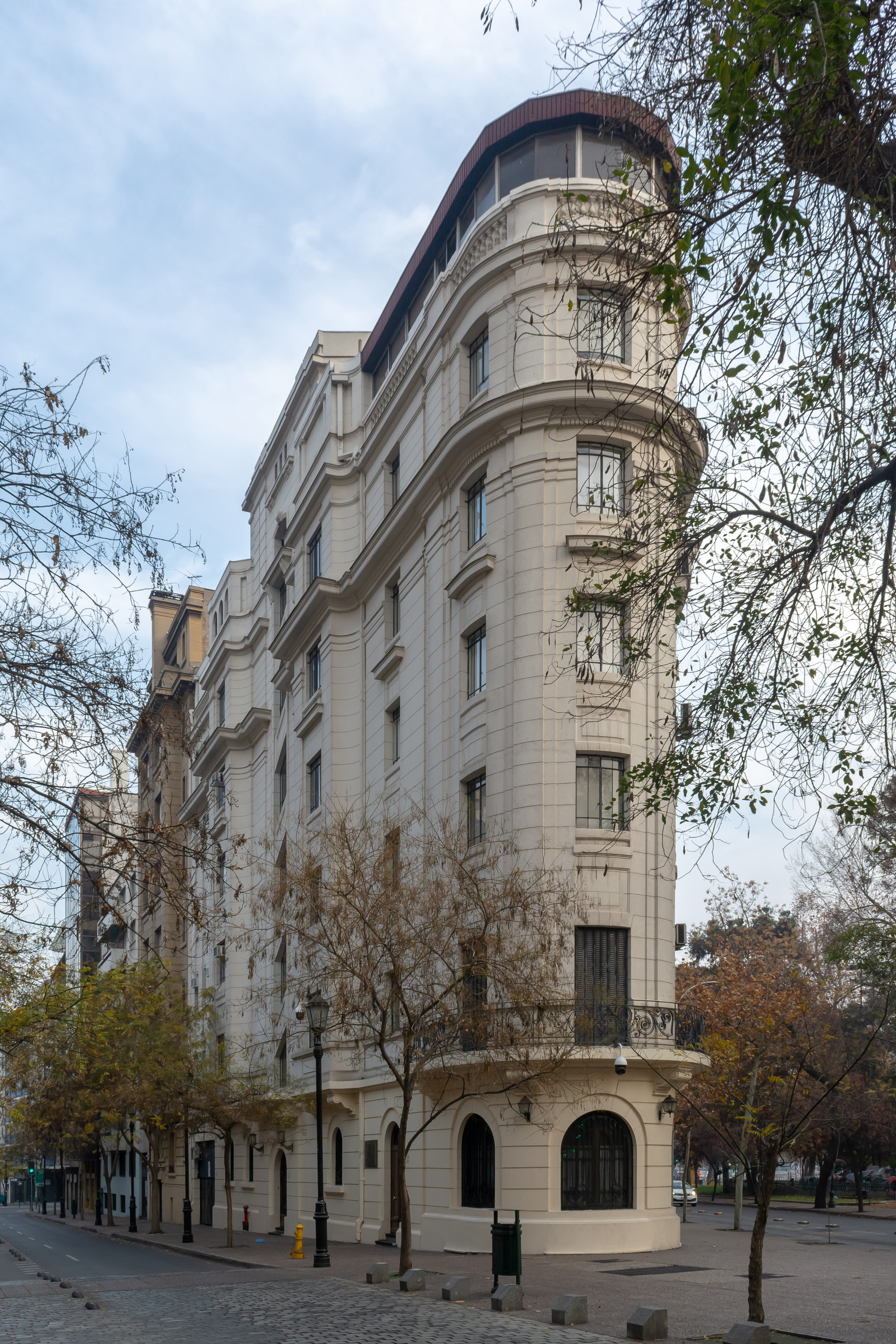
National headquarters of the Electoral Service in Santiago since 1986

The Electoral Service of Chile (Spanish: Servicio Electoral de Chile), better known by its acronym Servel, is an autonomous constitutional agency responsible for overseeing electoral processes in Chile. It administers national elections and referendums, supervises political party operations, ensures compliance with campaign finance regulations, and maintains the electoral register and party registry. Servel is the highest administrative authority on electoral matters in the country.

Servel's legal framework is established by a constitutional organic law, while its internal organization, staffing, and operational regulations are defined by statute.

Servel began operating on 1 October 1986 as the legal successor to the Electoral Registry Directorate (Dirección del Registro Electoral). Judicial oversight of electoral processes is exercised by the Election Certification Tribunal (Tribunal Calificador de Elecciones) and the Regional Electoral Tribunals.

A constitutional reform enacted in 2015 granted Servel full autonomy. Prior to this reform, the agency operated under the supervision of the President of the Republic through the Ministry of the Interior.

== History ==
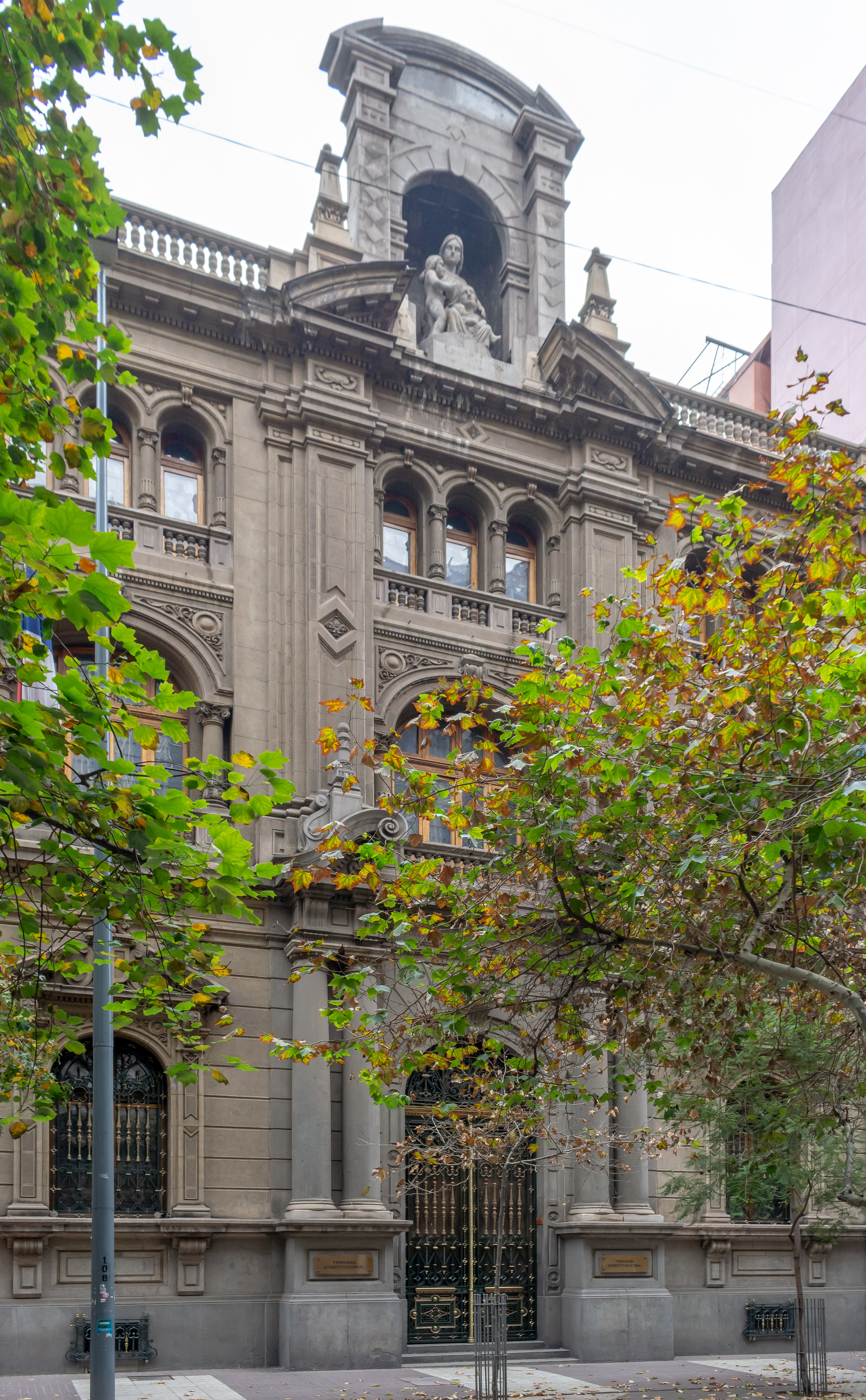
Headquarters of the Electoral Registry Directorate from 1957 to 1977

The origins of Chile's electoral administration date back to 1925, with the creation of the Electoral Registry Conservator (Conservador del Registro Electoral) through Decree Law No. 343. The office began registering voters on 15 April 1925. Decree Law No. 623, issued in October that year, defined the agency's initial staffing at six employees. Ramón Zañartu Eguiguren was appointed the first conservator.

Initially, the office compiled registration records from local boards. Its responsibilities later expanded to include cleaning and updating voter rolls, particularly after the passage of Law No. 4554 in 1929. The Electoral Registry Conservator was replaced by the Electoral Registry Directorate on 7 April 1931, under the terms of Decree with Force of Law No. 82, based on Law No. 4763. The Directorate operated until 1986 and was based in several locations over time, including offices in the National Congress building and, from 1957 to 1977, the former Mortgage Credit Fund building (now the headquarters of the Constitutional Court of Chile).

Following the 1973 military coup, allegations of fraud in previous elections led to a loss of confidence in the electoral system. In July 1974, the existing electoral rolls were destroyed, resulting in the loss of voter data from before 1973.

Servel was formally established by Law No. 18.556, published on 1 October 1986. It was housed at 611 Esmeralda Street in central Santiago, in a 1934 Art Nouveau building designed by architects Fernando de la Cruz and Hernán Rojas Santa María. Originally occupying only part of the building, Servel expanded to occupy the entire premises in January 1987.

In 2012, Law No. 20.568 introduced automatic voter registration and voluntary voting, and created a new Governing Council to oversee Servel. In 2015, Law No. 20.860 amended the Constitution to grant Servel full constitutional autonomy.

In June 2018, Servel's Citizen Services Unit began developing a Historical Archive. The project identified documents dating from 1925 to 1973 and established the Juan Ignacio García Collection, composed of the personal archives of a former Servel director. Additional electoral protocol documents were added to the collection in 2019.

== Organization ==
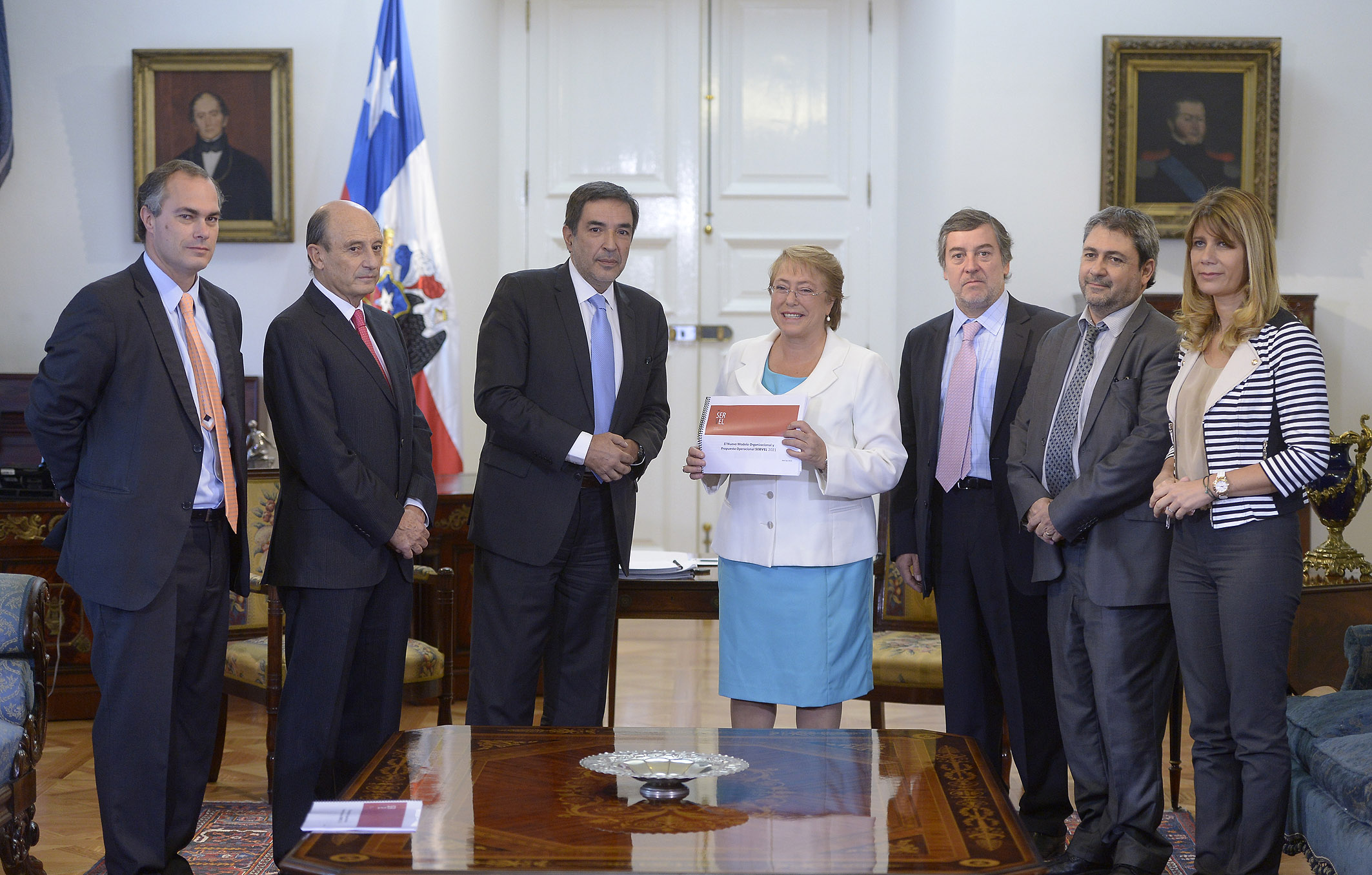
Servel council members meeting with President Michelle Bachelet in 2015

Since 2012, Servel has been governed by a Governing Council and a National Director. The Council is responsible for setting overall policy, while the Director handles day-to-day administration. Until 2015, Servel reported to the President of the Republic through the Ministry of the Interior.

The Governing Council consists of five members appointed by the President of the Republic, with the approval of two-thirds of the Senate. The President of the Council is designated by a majority vote of the Council for a four-year term. The President communicates the Council's decisions to the National Director, the Election Certification Tribunal, and the Regional Electoral Courts.

The National Director serves as the agency's legal representative and chief executive.

=== Governing Council ===
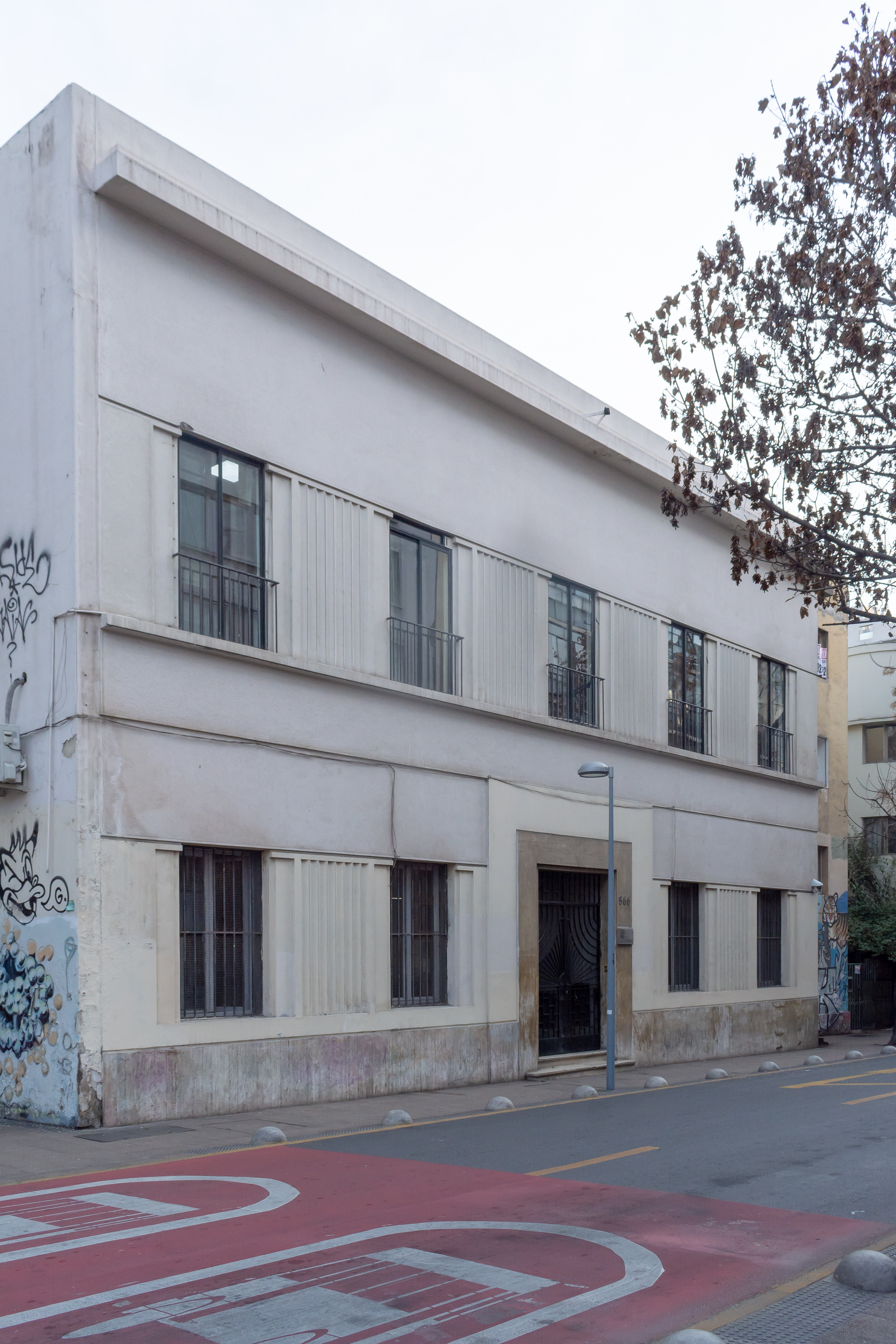
Headquarters of Servel’s Metropolitan Regional Directorate

Governing Council as of August 2025:

- Pamela Figueroa Rubio – President
- María Cristina Escudero Illanes – Member
- David Huina Valenzuela – Member
- Jorge Manzano Gouet - Member
- Marcelo Carvallo Ceroni - Member

=== Internal structure ===
The Electoral Service is administratively divided into three sub-directorates and territorially into 16 regional directorates:

- Sub-directorate of Voter Registration, Enrollments, and Electoral Events
- Sub-directorate of Political Parties
- Sub-directorate of Campaign Spending and Electoral Financing Oversight
- Regional Directorates

== List of authorities ==
=== Presidents of the Governing Council ===
Office holder	Start	End
Juan Emilio Cheyre Espinosa	18 February 2013	21 August 2013
Patricio Santamaría Mutis	21 August 2013	27 February 2021
Andrés Tagle Domínguez	27 February 2021	3 March 2025
Pamela Figueroa Rubio	3 March 2025	incumbent

=== National Directors ===
Until January 2012, the National Director held sole executive authority over Servel.

Officeholder	Start	End
Ramón Zañartu Eguiguren	19 October 1925	25 April 1958
Óscar Rojas Astaburuaga	25 April 1958	30 September 1965
Andrés Rillón Romani	1 October 1965	13 June 1977
Juan Ignacio García Rodríguez	13 June 1977	18 February 2013
Elizabeth Cabrera Burgos (interim)	18 February 2013	13 August 2014
Eduardo Charme Aguirre	13 August 2014	7 April 2016
Elizabeth Cabrera Burgos (acting)	7 April 2016	4 January 2017
Raúl García Aspillaga	4 January 2017	Incumbent
