= Nicolás Ibáñez Scott =

Chilean businessman

Nicolás Ibáñez

Personal details
- Born: 11 May 1956 (age 70) Santiago, Chile
- Party: None; close to centre-right
- Spouse(s): María Carolina Varela (−1999); Ana María Domínguez Tihista (2014−present)
- Parent(s): José Manuel Ibáñez; Sheila Scott Battiscombe
- Relatives: Manuel, Felipe, Suzanne and Victoria (brothers)
- Education: Adolfo Ibáñez University (BS) (1975−1980)
- Profession: Economist

Nicolás Cirilo Ibáñez Scott (born 11 May 1956) is a Chilean economist and businessman commonly known for having been the owner of the supermarket Líder, a shareholder of Papa John's, and for founding and financing the libertarian think tank Fundación para el Progreso (FPP) and its icon Axel Kaiser. He is also a columnist for newspapers such as El Mercurio and El Líbero.

Ibáñez's participation in the armed forces has been brought up in Chilean politics. Similarly, he told Revista Caras in 2004 that he has "enormous gratitude" for Augusto Pinochet. As a result, he has been attacked by progressive e-newspapers like El Desconcierto (left-wing) or The Clinic (centre-left), who have referred to him as a Pinochetist businessman. Likewise, other centre-left media like El Mostrador have criticized him for his defense of the Pinochet dictatorship and his role with the FPP.

== Biography ==
=== Early life: 1956−1980 ===
Ibáñez was born in Santiago de Chile. After his family settled in England, he attended The Grange School (1961−1969) until he was thirteen. He continued his studies at the Repton School (1970−1974), which influenced his strict personality. Upon his return to Chile, he enrolled as a reserve officer in the Chilean Navy.

In March 1975, he was based in Chile and began to study economics at the School of Business of the Adolfo Ibáñez University (UAI), which was founded by his paternal grandfather. His decision was closely linked to his father's business activities.

=== Spell at D&S: 1981−2014 ===
In 1981, Ibáñez joined to the family business. In the 1980s and 1990s, he became the commercial chair of companies such as Almac, D&S, Líder, and Ekono.

The success of D&S garnered interest from Walmart, which bought the family supermarket company in January 2009. For the five years after the purchase, Nicolás and Felipe maintained the 25.06% of the shares, selling them all to Walmart in 2014.

=== On the "ideas market": 2012−2020 ===
In 2012, Ibáñez founded the Fundación para el Progreso and appointed Axel Kaiser as its CEO as he was finishing his PhD at Heidelberg University.

In 2016, Ibánez declared he wanted to leave Chile.
