= Alfredo Joignant =

Chilean sociologist (born 1964)

Alfredo Roberto Joignant Rondón (born August 28, 1964) is a Chilean sociologist and political scientist who served on the Governing Council of Chile's Electoral Service (Servel) from 2013 to 2025. A professor at Diego Portales University and principal researcher at the Center for Social Conflict and Cohesion Studies (COES), he has played a prominent role in Chilean academic and political discourse. Joignant has also held leadership positions in professional associations, contributed to major policy debates, and maintained a regular presence in national media.

== Early life and education ==
Joignant was born in Santiago, Chile. He is the son of Alfredo Joignant Muñoz, who served as Intendant of Santiago and Director of the Investigations Police (PDI) during the government of Salvador Allende. Following the 1973 coup d'état, his father was imprisoned on Dawson Island, and the family was later expelled from the country. Joignant lived in exile in France for 13 years before returning to Chile in 1989. He attended Colegio Manuel de Salas in Santiago and later continued his education in Paris.

He earned his PhD in political science from Paris 1 Panthéon-Sorbonne University in 1995.

== Academic career ==
Joignant is a full professor at the School of Political Science of Diego Portales University. He previously served as president of the Chilean Political Science Association from 1998 to 2000. He has held visiting academic positions at Paris 1 Panthéon-Sorbonne, Paris III (Pablo Neruda Chair in Chilean Studies), the Institute of Political Studies in Grenoble, and Leiden University in the Netherlands.

His research has been published in numerous international academic journals, including Revue française de science politique, Genèses, Politix, Journal of Latin American Studies, Revista mexicana de sociología, Democratization, Bulletin of Latin American Research, Política y Gobierno, and Estudios Públicos.

Joignant was a member of the French jury d'agrégation in political science in 2019.

== Government role ==
In 2013, Joignant was appointed by the Chilean Senate, following a proposal from President Sebastián Piñera, as a member of the Governing Council of the Electoral Service for a four-year term. In 2017, he was confirmed by the Senate for an additional six-year term, this time on the proposal of President Michelle Bachelet. Although his mandate formally expired in February 2023, Joignant remained in office under a legal provision that allowed councilors to stay on until their replacement was appointed. Following a protracted political dispute between the Socialist Party (PS) and President Gabriel Boric over control of the seat, the President ultimately nominated PS member and former undersecretary Marcelo Carvallo Ceroni as his replacement. The Senate approved Carvallo's nomination on July 15, 2025, formally ending Joignant's 12-year tenure on the council.

== Public engagement ==
Joignant has been an active participant in Chilean public discourse, particularly in debates on democracy, political representation, and institutional reform. He is a member of the Socialist Party, although his party affiliation was suspended by law during his tenure at Servel. Joignant co-authored El otro modelo (2013), a widely cited critique of Chile's neoliberal framework. He is a regular contributor to political media programs such as Tolerancia Cero on CNN Chile and Mesa Central on Tele13 Radio, where he hosts his own podcast, Hay algo allá afuera. Since 2023, he has published a weekly opinion column in El País newspaper.

He has also been a vocal critic of populist discourse in Latin America, notably denouncing the book El engaño populista by Axel Kaiser and Gloria Álvarez. In 2018, he publicly debated Recoleta mayor Daniel Jadue, a member of the Communist Party and supporter of the Maduro government, over the political situation in Venezuela.

== Personal life ==
Joignant is married to Carolina Carrera and has two children. He enjoys listening to heavy metal music and has an interest in the UFO phenomenon.

== Works ==
=== Books (author or co-author) ===
- El gesto y la palabra (LOM-Arcis, 1998)
- Los enigmas de la comunidad perdida (LOM, 2002)
- Un día distinto. Memorias festivas y batallas conmemorativas en torno al 11 de septiembre en Chile, 1974–2006 (Editorial Universitaria, 2007)
- El socialismo y los tiempos de la historia. Diálogos exigentes (with Gonzalo Martner, Prensa Latinoamericana, 2003)
- Acting Politics: A Critical Sociology of the Political Field (Routledge, 2019)
- El juego político: Una sociología crítica del campo político (Tecnos, 2022; revised Spanish edition of Acting Politics)
- El otro modelo. Del orden neoliberal al régimen de lo público (with Fernando Atria et al., Debate, 2013)

=== Edited or co-edited volumes ===
- La caja de Pandora. El retorno de la transición chilena (with Amparo Menéndez-Carrión, Planeta-Ariel, 1999)
- El arte de clasificar a los chilenos (with Pedro Güell, Ediciones UDP, 2009)
- Notables, tecnócratas y mandarines. Elementos de sociología de las elites en Chile, 1990–2010 (Ediciones UDP, 2011)
- The Politics of Memory in Chile: From Pinochet to Bachelet (with Cath Collins and Katherine Hite, Lynne Rienner, 2013)
- Las políticas de la memoria en Chile (Spanish edition, Ediciones UDP, 2013)
- Gouverner par la science: Perspectives comparées (with Yves Déloye and Olivier Ihl, Presses universitaires de Grenoble, 2013)
- Ecos mundiales del golpe de Estado. Escritos sobre el 11 de septiembre de 1973 (with Patricio Navia, Ediciones UDP, 2013)
- La solución constitucional (with Claudio Fuentes, Catalonia, 2015)
- Malaise in Representation in Latin American Countries (with Mauricio Morales and Claudio Fuentes, Palgrave, 2017)
