= Soft coup =

Nonviolent illegal attempt to control a government

A soft coup, sometimes referred to as a silent coup, is an illegal overthrow of a government. Unlike a classical coup d'état, it is achieved without the use of military force.

== Definition ==
The concept of a soft coup as a strategy is attributed to the American political scientist Gene Sharp, a Professor Emeritus of political science at the University of Massachusetts Dartmouth and Nobel Peace Prize nominee, who has been a theorist and author of works on the dynamics of nonviolent conflict. He studied the potential to spark, guide, and maximize the power of sometimes short-lived mass uprisings, as he tried to understand how unarmed insurrections have been far more politically significant than observers focused on military warfare have cared to admit.

According to Axel Kaiser, a Chilean lawyer member of the Mises Institute, the soft coup is often part of a conspiracy theory used by Latin American populists who seek the centralization of power but do so under the pretense of improving democracy. Kaiser argues that the Latin American leaders' rationale is that democracy should be a system where the general will must be absolute, and that the populist leader describes himself as the representative of the general will by virtue of having been elected by the people. Kaiser says that these leaders feel that the will of the leader equals the general will, and that any limits on the will of the leader would also be a limit to the general will itself. In this scenario, opposition to the leader is treated as an act against democracy, justifying persecution of the opposition, forced nationalizations and limits to the freedom of the press. This notion of democracy is opposed to the one traditionally held in the United States, which holds that rulers must have limits to their power; it also conflicts with minority rights.

Several military coups took place in South America during the 20th century, in particular during the Cold War. There is a perception of those coups as negative events; the legacy of Operation Condor evokes continuing mistrust among the general population. Hence, as the supporters of the deposed leaders often attribute the old coups to generalized authors instead of specific ones (such as the press, the private sector of the economy, the judiciary and imperialism), they tend to argue that the alleged coups have been attempted by those same authors.

== See also ==
- Constitutional coup
- Democratic backsliding
- Nonviolent revolution
- Self-coup

== Bibliography ==
- Kaiser, Axel; Álvarez, Gloria (2016). El engaño populista [The populist lie] (in Spanish). Colombia: Ariel. ISBN 978-987-3804-39-7.
