= Vanessa Kaiser =

Chilean columnist and politician

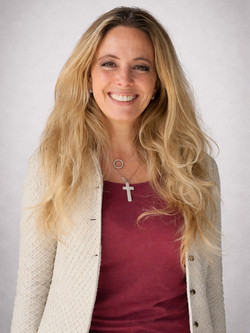

Member of the Senate
- Incumbent
- Assumed office 11 March 2026
- Constituency: Araucanía Region

Member of the Las Condes City Council
- In office 28 June 2021 – 28 April 2022
- Succeeded by: Leonardo Prat Fernández

Personal details
- Born: Vanessa Olimpia Kaiser Barents-Von Hohenhagen; 25 October 1977 (age 48) Santiago, Chile
- Party: PNL (since 2024)
- Other political affiliations: PRCh (2020–2021); Independent (2021–2024)
- Relatives: Axel and Johannes Kaiser (brothers)
- Education: Finis Terrae University (BA); University of Chile (MA); Pontifical Catholic University of Chile (PhD)
- Occupation: Journalist • YouTuber • Politician
- Website: www.telepensantes.com

Vanessa Olimpia Kaiser Barents-Von Hohenhagen (born 25 October 1977) is a Chilean columnist and politician who served as a councilwoman of Las Condes, since 2024 is member of the National Libertarian Party founded by her brother Johannes Kaiser.

== Biography ==
Vanessa Kaiser was born from Hans Christian Kaiser Wagner and Rosmarie Barents Haensgen, a German-Chilean family.

Her paternal grandparents were Rosemarie Wagner Schilling, a fourth-generation German-Chilean, and her husband, the German immigrant Friedrich Ernst Kaiser Richter, who defined politically as a Social Democrat, arrived in Chile as a refugee from Wurtemberg in 1936, escaping National Socialist Germany after Adolf Hitler's rise to power and before World War II, having foreseen its outbreak.

He married his wife in April 1939 and settled in Villarrica in Southern Chile, where he was eventually elected as the 9th mayor of the city, serving between May 1956 and October 1957. Her father was active in the National Party, serving as a youth leader.

She has a Master of Arts in philosophy, a PhD in political sciences and a PhD in philosophy.

She is the CEO of the Libertarian Centre of Studies of Chile (Spanish: Centro de Estudios Libertarios CEL), and a columnist of El Líbero and El Mostrador. Her brothers are Axel Kaiser, a Chilean lawyer and author, of Johannes Kaiser, a congressman and Politician, founder of the National Libertarian Party, along with three other less prominent siblings.

Vanessa has given a lecture at the Fundación para el Progreso (FPP), where she has denounced liberalism as the "true bailout [of society]".

She held the Hannah Arendt chair of the Autonomous University of Chile between 2018 and 2021.

She was elected as councilman of Las Condes in 2021 and resigned in 2022 for personal reasons.

She signed the Madrid Charter, a document drafted by the far-right Spanish party Vox that describes left-wing groups as enemies of Ibero-America involved in a "criminal project" that are "under the umbrella of the Cuban regime."

== Works ==
=== Books ===
- with Alejandro Briones Bascuñan: Triple corona. Rockford. Rockford, Chile 2007, OCLC 1318901673.
- «En vez de una sola mirada». Santiago, RIL Editorial, 2011.
- «Que no te rompan el corazón». Santiago, 2018.
- Estudio nietzscheano del Mandamiento: «amarás a tu prójimo como a ti mismo» (Mateo 22:39). Philosophische Dissertation, Pontificia Universidad Católica de Chile, Santiago 2019.
- «El Progresismo y la Cultura de la Muerte. Claves para entender el proyecto ideológico y político de la Nueva Izquierda». Editorial Conservadora, Santiago 2024, ISBN 978-956-6172-32-1.

=== Articles ===
- «Populismo en América Latina. Una revisión de la literatura y la agenda». Austral University Social Sciences Magazine. N°17. 2017.
- «La pluralidad humana en tanto conditio per quan de la vida política». Academy of Christian Humanism University Scholar Magazine. N°20. Vol. 85. 2015.
- «George Kateb, Dignidad Humana». Vol. 32. N°1. Harvard University Press, 2011.
- «El Neomercantilismo como modelo de mercado en Latinoamérica». Pléyade Magazine (Pontifical Catholic University of Chile). N°5. 2010.
- With Andrés Dockendorff «Populismo en América Latina. Una revisión de la literatura y la agenda». Revista de Ciencias Sociales 2009 Page 75–100 DOI: 10.4206/rev.austral.cienc.soc.2009.n17-05
