= Hugo Gutiérrez =

Hugo Gutiérrez may refer to:

- Hugo Gutiérrez (footballer), Argentine footballer
- Hugo Gutiérrez Gálvez, Chilean politician
- Hugo Gutiérrez Vega, Mexican poet, lawyer, writer and academic
- Hugo Gutierrez Jr., Filipino jurist and civil liberties advocate
