= Natalia Riffo =

Chilean politician and psychologist

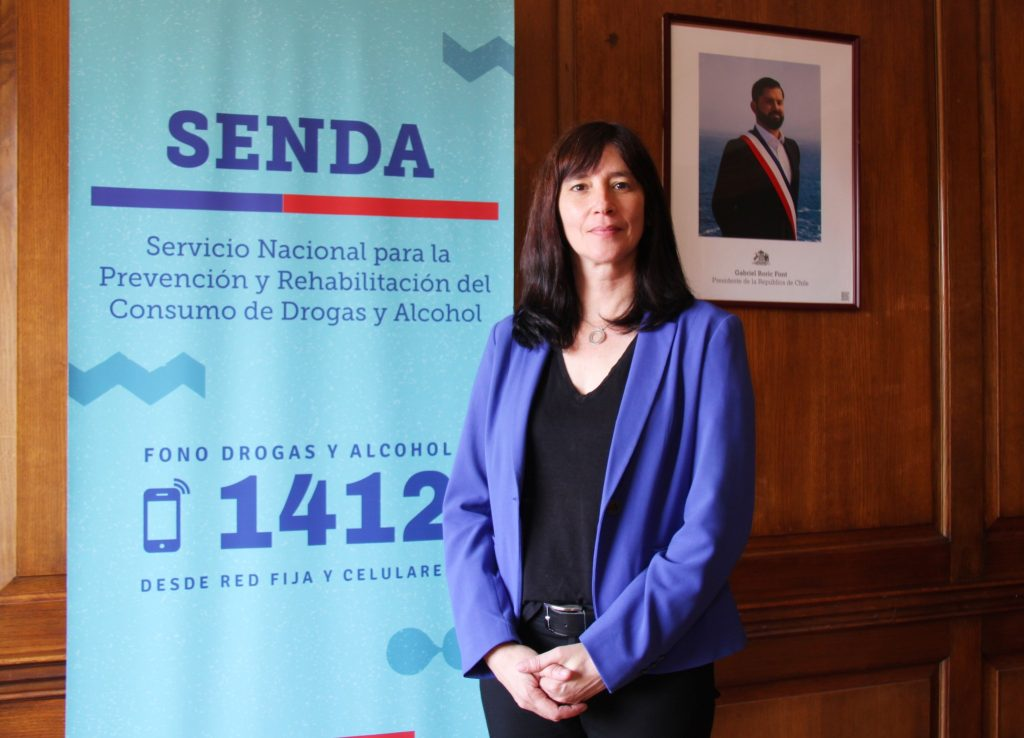
- Official portrait (2023)

Minister of Sports
- In office 11 March 2014 – 18 November 2018
- President: Gabriel Ruíz-Tagle
- Preceded by: Pablo Squella
- Succeeded by: Pauline Kantor

Personal details
- Born: 24 July 1971 (age 55) Temuco, Chile
- Party: Movimiento Amplio Social
- Spouse: Álvaro Riffo Ramos
- Children: Two
- Education: University of Concepción (B.Sc)
- Occupation: Politician
- Profession: Psychologist

Natalia Odette Riffo Alonso (born 24 July 1971) is a Chilean politician and psychologist who was minister of the second government of Michelle Bachelet (2014−2018).

== Early life and education ==
Riffo is the daughter of Ramón Francisco Riffo Olivares, a police detective, and Gladys Odette Alonso Donat, a psychologist.

She is married to sociologist Álvaro Riffo Ramos, with whom she has two children.

Riffo completed her primary education at Darío Salas School in San Pedro de la Paz and her secondary education at Colegio Inmaculada Concepción. She later studied psychology at the University of Concepción, where she earned her professional degree. She also completed studies in criminology and security at the Central University of Chile and obtained a master's degree in forensic psychology from Lusófona University of Porto in Portugal.

== Political career ==
Riffo began her public-sector career working in the "Safe Community" programme in San Pedro de la Paz. During the administration of President Ricardo Lagos, she served as head of human resources for National Health Fund (FONASA) in the Biobío Region. Between 2009 and 2010, she was national head of crime and delinquency prevention, and from 2011 to 2013 worked in the Ministry of the Interior's Critical Neighbourhood Public Security Programme before becoming a public security adviser to the Municipality of Santiago Centro.

In January 2014, President-elect Michelle Bachelet appointed Riffo Minister of Sport, making her the first woman to hold the office. Her appointment initially attracted attention because of her limited professional background in sports administration. She assumed office while the South American Games were being held in Santiago. She remained in office until November 2016.

Between July 2021 and November 2022, Riffo served as executive director of the Municipal Sports Corporation of Ñuñoa under the administration of mayor Emilia Ríos.

On 1 December 2022, she was appointed national director of the National Service for the Prevention and Rehabilitation of Drug and Alcohol Consumption (SENDA) through Chile's Senior Public Management System (Chile)|Senior Public Management System. The agency operates under the Ministry of the Interior.
