= José Rodríguez Elizondo =

Chilean lawyer and diplomat (born 1936)

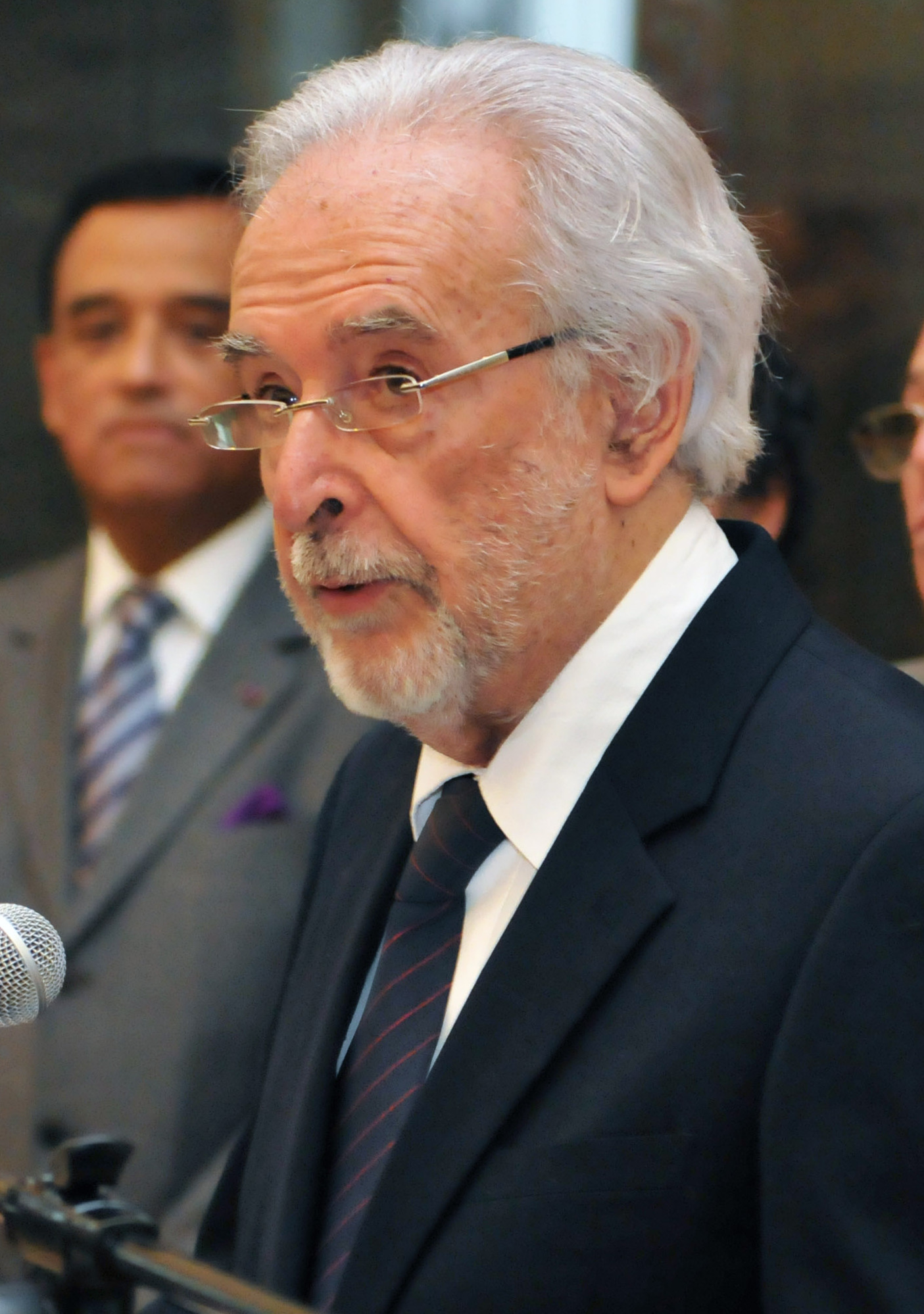

Ambassador of Chile to Israel
- In office 1 January 1997 – 1 January 2000
- President: Eduardo Frei Ruíz-Tagle
- Preceded by: Jorge Tapia Valdés
- Succeeded by: Sally Bendersky Schachner

Vice President of Chile Films Board
- In office 1970–1973

Fiscal of the Corporación de Fomento de la Producción
- In office 1970–1973

Personal details
- Born: 10 June 1936 (age 90) Santiago, Chile
- Party: Communist Party (1960s–1976); Amarillos por Chile (2022–present)
- Education: University of Chile (BA)
- Profession: Lawyer

José Alejandro Vladimir Rodríguez Elizondo (born 10 June 1936) is a Chilean lawyer and diplomat who was awarded the National Prize of Humanities and Social Sciences in 2021. He finished his Bachelor of Arts in laws in 1960 at the University of Chile, his alma mater.

During the Popular Unity alliance (1970−1973), Rodríguez Elizondo worked in the Corporación de Fomento de la Producción (CORFO). Following the 1973 coup d'état, he went into exile to East Germany, where then he escaped to the West Germany in mid 1970s. After that, he was based in Peru from 1977 to 1986, where he worked for Caretas magazine alongside figures like the writer Mario Vargas Llosa.

He has been a columnist in media like El Líbero, liberal e-newspaper. Similarly, he has gained renown through his book «History of the civil-military relationship in Chile», work that has been released in interviews like the developed by Tomás Mosciatti in April 2018.

== Early life ==
In 1952, he finished the High School at the Liceo de Aplicación.

== Works ==
=== Books ===
He has written 22 books:

- «Vietnam: testimony and analysis». Orbe Editorial, Buenos Aires, 1968.
- «Mithology of the far-left». Austral Editorial, Santiago de Chile, 1971.
- «Introduction to the chilean fascism». Ayuso Editorial, México City, 1976.
- «Democracy and Human Rights in Latinamerica». Spanish Agency of International Cooperation, Madrid, 1989.
- «The United Nations in Spain». University of Salamanca Editorial, 1991.
- «The crisis of the left-wings in Latinamerica». Co-edited by the Iberoamerican Cooperation Institute and the New Society Editorial, Caracas-Madrid, 1990.
- «Vargas Llosa: History of a double patricide». La Noria Editorial, 1993.
- «The law is stronger. Chilean civilians and military amid a historical process». Zeta Editorial Group, 1995.
- «The Neruda that I met». Aurora Editorial, 2000.
- «The Pope and his Jewish brothers». Andrés Bello Editorial, Santiago de Chile, 2001.
- «Chile, a case of a successful underdevelopment: from the Fit State of Portales to the State in formation of Lagos». Andrés Bello Editorial, Santiago de Chile, 2002
- «Chile-Perú, the century where we live in danger». La Tercera Mondadori Editorial, Santiago de Chile, 2004.
- «The crisis with neighboring countries during Ricardo Lagos government». Random House Mondadori Editorial, 2006.
- «From Charaña to The Hague». La Tercera Editorial, Santiago de Chile, 2009.
- «Post-The Hague themes». Editorial Planeta, 2010.
- «Falklands War. New in progress: 1982−2012». El Mercurio Aguilar, Santiago de Chile, 2012.
- «History of two demands: Perú and Bolivia against Chile». El Mercurio Editions, Santiago de Chile, 2014.
- «The world also exists: the last two decades of the planet, Chile included». RIL Editors, 2014.
- «All about Bolivia». El Mercurio Editions, Santiago de Chile, 2016.
- «Selection of Reality and Perspectives». RIL Editors, Santiago de Chile, 2017.
- «History of the civil-military relationship in Chile». Fondo de Cultura Económica, Santiago de Chile, 2018.
- «The day which they killed me». Catalonia Editorial, Santiago de Chile, 2019.

=== Novels ===
- «So as not to kill the general». Editorial Planeta, Santiago, 1993.
- «The passion of Iñaki». Andrés Bello Editorial, Santiago, 1997.

=== Stories ===
- «Nosferatu and other exiles». Aconcagua Editorial, Santiago, 1985.
- «A first nude and other tales of humor and wonder». Radio Universidad de Chile Editorial, Santiago, 2007.
