= Alejandro San Francisco =

Chilean historian

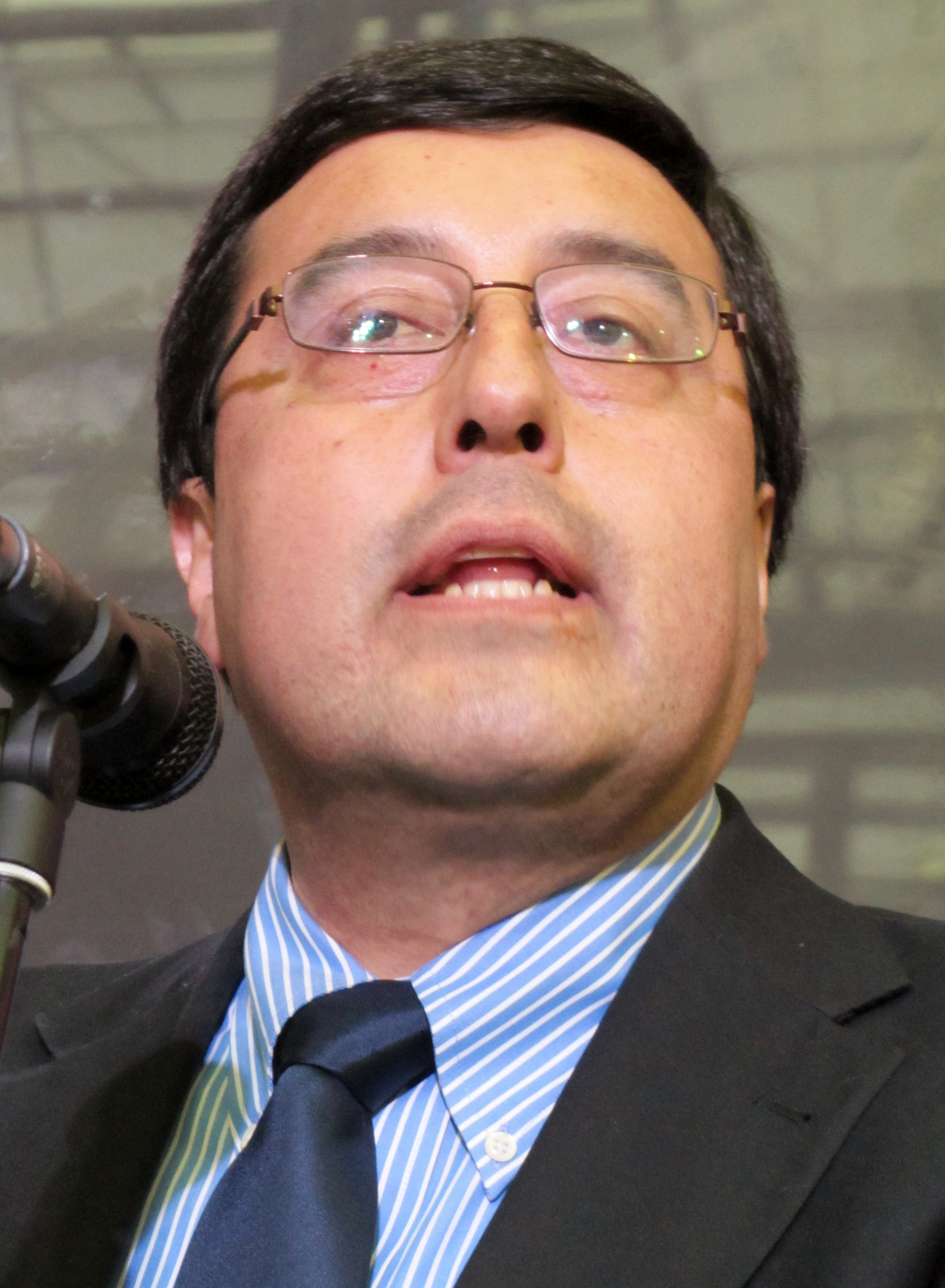

President of the Pontifical Catholic University of Chile Students Federation
- In office 1994–1995
- Preceded by: Fulvio Rossi
- Succeeded by: Álvaro Cruzat

Personal details
- Born: Chile
- Other political affiliations: Gremialist Movement
- Education: Pontifical Catholic University of Chile (BA); University of Oxford (PhD)
- Occupation: Columnist
- Profession: Historian

Alejandro San Francisco is a Chilean historian. San Francisco was an advisor of Joaquín Lavín when he was minister of Education. Since 2014 he has also been a columnist for El Líbero, a libertarian online newspaper.

San Francisco was president of the Pontifical Catholic University of Chile Students Federation (FEUC).

On 9 January 2018, he was appointed as Chief of the Institute of History of San Sebastián University.
