= Cecilia Pérez =

Chilean politician

Cecilia Pérez Jara
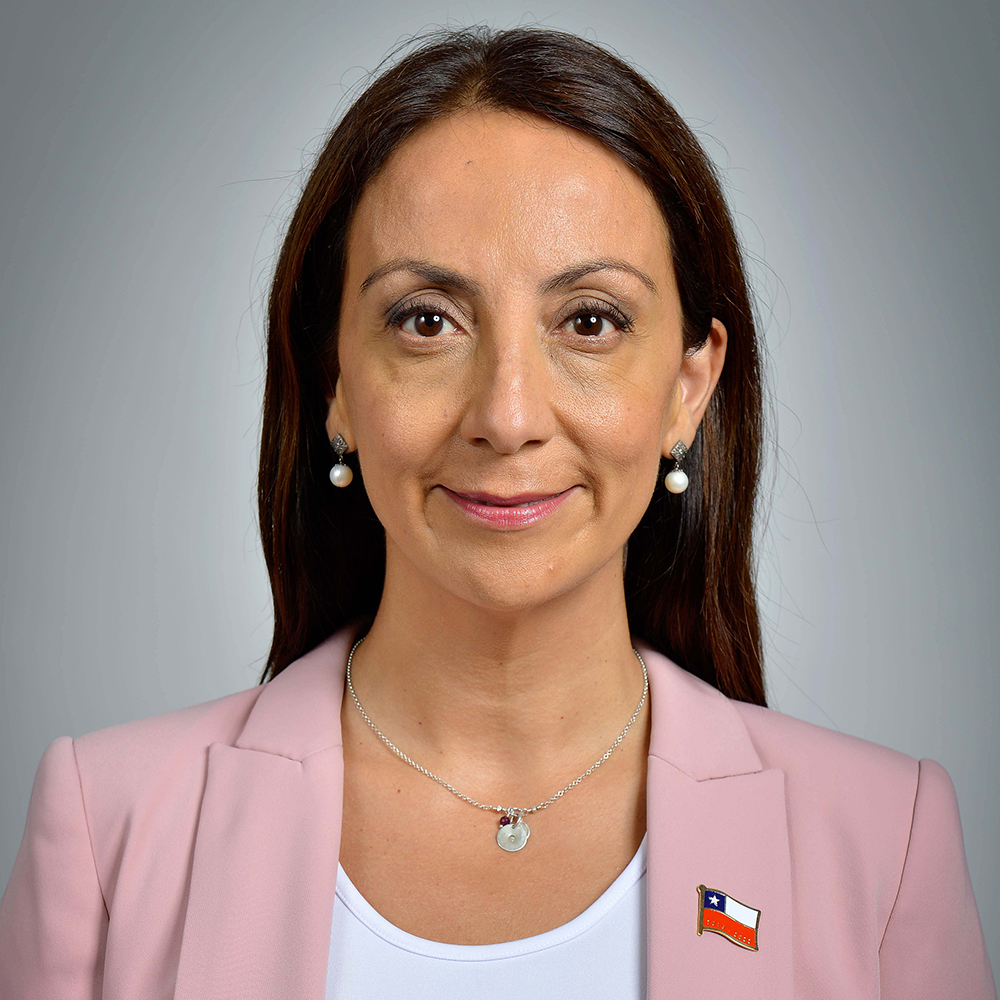
- Cecilia Pérez in 2018

Minister of Sports
- In office 28 October 2019 – 11 March 2022
- President: Sebastián Piñera
- Preceded by: Pauline Kantor
- Succeeded by: Alexandra Benado

Minister General Secretary of Government
- In office 5 November 2012 – 11 March 2014
- Preceded by: Andrés Chadwick
- Succeeded by: Álvaro Elizalde
- In office 11 March 2018 – 28 October 2019
- Preceded by: Paula Narváez
- Succeeded by: Karla Rubilar

Intendant of the Metropolitan Region of Santiago
- In office 21 July 2011 – 5 November 2012
- Preceded by: Fernando Echeverría
- Succeeded by: Juan Antonio Peribonio

Vice-chief of the National Women's Service
- In office 7 February 2011 – 21 July 2011
- Preceded by: María Paz Lagos
- Succeeded by: Jessica Mulaim

Councilor of La Florida
- In office 6 September 2000 – 3 February 2011
- Succeeded by: Orlando Vidal Duarte

Personal details
- Born: 23 September 1974 (age 52) Santiago, Chile
- Party: Renovación Nacional
- Spouse: Carlos Contreras (2004−2014)
- Children: Two
- Education: Andrés Bello National University (LL.B)
- Occupation: Politician
- Profession: Lawyer

Cecilia Pérez Jara (born 23 September 1974) is a Chilean politician which has served as minister in the two governments of Sebastián Piñera.

From 2011 to 2012, she was intendant of the Santiago Metropolitan Region.

== Biography ==
=== Early life ===
Pérez. was born in the capital Santiago on 23 September 1974. She was one of the three children from the marriage formed by Luis Agustín Pérez and Ana Delia Jara.

She completed her basic studies at the English High School in her hometown. Her secondary studies were carried out at the Corazón de María School of San Miguel. In 1994, Pérez entered the Universidad Nacional Andrés Bello (UNAB) Law School, graduating as a lawyer on 21 November 2010.

=== Political career ===
In 1995, she joined the political party Renovación Nacional (RN). Also, Pérez served as president of the board of the 26th District of La Florida commune. In 2006, Pérez was the Regional President of RN in the Santiago Metropolitan Region as well as its General Counselor since 1998. From 1998 to 2006, she was Chief of Staff of then-Deputy Lily Pérez.

In 2000, Cecilia was elected councilor for La Florida, where she was re-elected for three consecutive terms: 1) 2000−2004, 2) 2004−2008, and 3) 2008−2012. However, she didn't conclude her last period due to her appointment as deputy director of National Women's Service (Sernam). She has also served as Director of Communications in the Municipality of Puente Alto, where she coordinated relations between the municipality and the inhabitants of the commune. From 2008 to 2009, she actively participated in the leadership programs and seminars of the Women's Community on the topics of social co-responsibility, political communication, and the role of women.

In 2010, Pérez was elected Vice President of RN for the 2010−2012 period, resigning the position upon assuming as Intendant of Santiago Metropolitan Region. Similarly, she also served as caretaker Secretary-General of RN from July 2010 to December 2010.

On 3 February 2011, she was appointed by President Sebastián Piñera as deputy director of the Sernam, holding the position from 7 February to 21 July, the last date when she was appointed metropolitan mayor by President Piñera. In that way, she was the third woman to hold that position in Chile after Adriana Delpiano and Ximena Rincón.

On 5 November 2012, Pérez was appointed Minister Secretary-General of the Government by Piñera, who changed Andrés Chadwick. She hold that position until the end of Piñera's first presidential term on 11 March 2014.

Once her functions as government spokesperson concluded, since March 2014 she has served as vice-president of the Fundación Avanza Chile board, a think tank opposed to the second government of Michelle Bachelet (2014−2018). Since March 2014, she hosted the Radio Agricultura program Las Cosas por su Nombre («The things by their name») alongside the writer Fernando Villegas.

During Piñera's second administration (2018−2022), Pérez returned to the cabinet in March 2018, being appointed again as Minister Secretary-General of the Government. She remained in office until 28 October 2019 amid the Estallido Social.
