= Rainer Zitelmann =

German historian and author

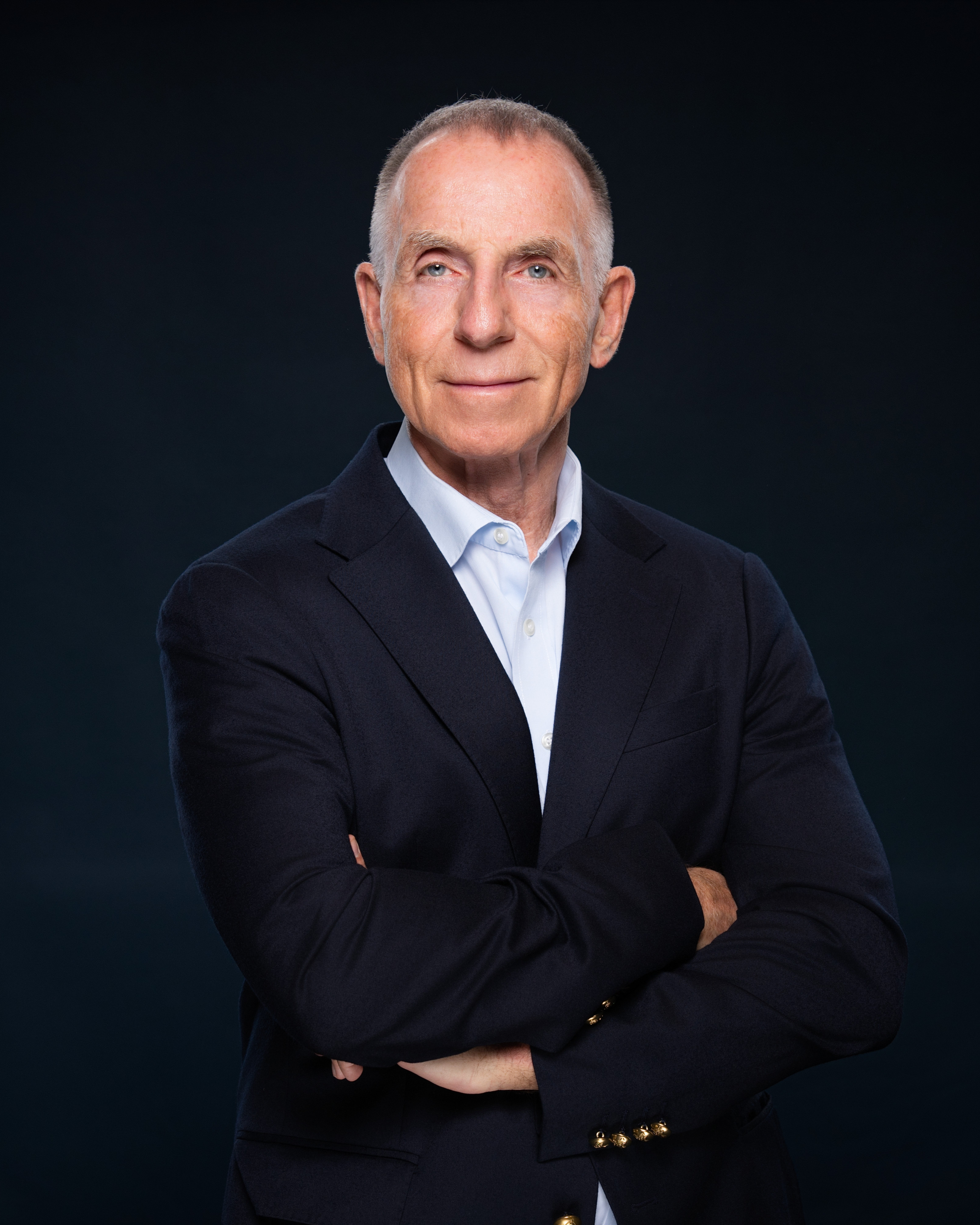
Zitelmann in 2026 by Frank Nürnberger

Rainer Zitelmann (born 14 June 1957) is a German historian, sociologist, author, management consultant and real estate expert.

== Life ==
Zitelmann was born in Frankfurt. He studied history and political science at the Technical University of Darmstadt. He completed his doctorate in 1986 under Karl Otmar Freiherr von Aretin with the grade of summa cum laude the subject being the goals of Hitler's social, economic and interior policies. Zitelmann's doctoral dissertation, Hitler: Selbstverständnis eines Revolutionärs went through four editions in Germany and was published in English under the title "Hitler: The Politics of Seduction" (London: London House, 2000).

Then, Zitelmann pursued a career in conservative print media. After his work as a research assistant at the Free University of Berlin, he became an editorial director for the publishing company Ullstein and Propyläen in 1992. Soon, he transferred to the German daily Die Welt as the head of desk for contemporary thought. Later, Zitelmann transferred to the desk for contemporary history and finally to the real estate desk.

In 2000, he founded Dr.ZitelmannPB. GmbH, which had many international companies among its clients, including CBRE, Ernst & Young Real Estate, Jamestown, Cordea Savills and NCC. Zitelmann was the managing director of Dr. ZitelmannPB. GmbH until the end of February 2016, when he sold the company in an MBO.

In 2016, he was awarded his second doctorate, this time in sociology (Dr. rer. pol) at the University of Potsdam. The subject of his second doctoral dissertation was the psychology of the super-rich. His dissertation was published in a variety of languages, including Chinese and Korean, as well as in English under the title The Wealth Elite.

== Author ==
Zitelmann has written and edited 32 books, which have been published in 35 languages, among others: English, German, Spanish, Italian, Portuguese, Chinese, Japanese, Korean, Vietnamese, Russian, Polish, Arabic, Hindi, Urdu. He writes also articles in The Wall Street Journal, Forbes.com, Linkiesta, Neue Zürcher Zeitung, The National Interest, Townhall, Washington Examiner, wallstreet:online, Daily Telegraph, City AM, Neue Zürcher Zeitung, Welt, Focus, Frankfurter Allgemeine Zeitung and The European.

== Examination of National Socialism ==
=== Hitler's sense of self as a revolutionary ===
As a historian, Zitelmann is best known for his argument that Nazi Germany followed a conscious strategy of modernization. In his doctoral thesis, Zitelmann strove to show that the modernising efforts of the Third Reich, which had been diagnosed by scholars like Ralf Dahrendorf, David Schoenbaum and Henry Ashby Turner, were intended as such. Unlike Dahrendorf, Schoenbaum and Turner, who argued that the modernisation of German society during the Nazi period was an unintentional side effect or merely a necessary adjunct towards achieving profoundly antimodern goals, Zitelmann argued that modernization of German society was intended and a central goal of the Nazis. A review published in the Berlin daily Der Tagesspiegel dated 14 July 1988, suggests that "the most important finding of [Zitelmann's] work" is that "Hitler saw himself uncompromisingly as a revolutionary. Dahrendorf and Schoenbaum’s hypothesis, according to which National Socialism had a revolutionising and modernising effect in the social area without actually having intended it, needs to be revised".

Zitelmann argues that far from seeking the agrarian fantasies of Heinrich Himmler or Richard Walther Darré, Hitler wished to see a highly-industrialised Germany that would be on the leading edge of modern technology. Closely linked to the latter goal was what Zitelmann maintains was Hitler's desire to see the destruction of the traditional values and class distinctions of German society and their replacement for at least those Germans considered "Aryan" of a relatively-egalitarian merit-based society. Zitelmann argued that far from being incoherent, disorganised, confused and marginal as traditionally viewed, Hitler's social ideas were in fact very logical and systematic and at the core of Hitler's Weltanschauung (worldview). Zitelmann has argued Hitler was much influenced by Joseph Stalin's modernization of the Soviet Union and that as Führer, Hitler consciously pursued a revolutionary modernization of German society. As part of his arguments, Zitelmann has maintained that "modernisation" should be regarded as a fundamentally "value-free" description, and that one should avoid the knee-jerk association of modernization with "progress" and humanitarianism. Zitelmann's work has faced criticism from those such as Ian Kershaw, who have argued that Zitelmann has elevated what were merely secondary considerations in Hitler's remarks to the primary level and that Zitelmann has not offered a clear definition of "modernization".

The Bonn-based historian Klaus Hildebrand reviewed the thesis for the German daily Süddeutsche Zeitung in its 29 September 1987, issue: "To view Hitler—just like Stalin and Mao Zedong—as representatives of a permanent revolution or a modernising dictatorship reopens an academic debate that has been ongoing since the years between the wars of the twentieth century. To be welcomed in this context is that Zitelmann, critically controlling his sources and striving for objective balance, inquires with renewed vigour into Hitler’s motives while remaining fully aware of the fact that history fails to coincide with human intentions".

In his research overview, The Hitler of History (New York: Alfred A. Knopf, 1997), the American historian John Lukacs presented Zitelmann's thesis, as well as his book Hitler. Eine politische Biographie ("Hitler. A Political Biography""), as important contributions to the scientific study of Hitler. The echo in specialist journals, such as the Journal of Modern History (in a review by historian Klemens von Klemperer), and the Historische Zeitschrift, were predominantly positive. In the latter, Germany's leading academic journal for historiography, historian Peter Krüger wrote, "Rainer Zitelmann has written one of those books that make you wonder why they have not been available much earlier". In the historiographic quarterly Vierteljahreshefte für Zeitgeschichte, the Polish historian Franciszek Ryszka agreed: "Without a doubt, Dr. Zitelmann’s merit is to have substantially amended, and possibly surpassed, all other Hitler biographies".

However, critical voices existed like in the German weekly Die Zeit of 2 October 1987. On 22 September 1989, the critical review in Die Zeit was followed by another review of the two Hitler studies that had some critical remarks but came to the overall conclusion that Zitelmann had submitted a Hitler biography that was "emphatically sober, without any superfluous moralising, not omitting any of the dictator's villainies". However, the reviewer suggested that "the image of Hitler drawn by the author [calls for] some amendments and corrections".

The American Historical Review wrote in May 1989, "Zitelmann's book is an admirable example of exhaustive scholarship on an important aspect of the mind of Hitler. But it is less likely to stand as a decisive synthesis than as a provocative turn in the pursuit of the eternal enigmas of the Third Reich and its creator". In the February 1988 issue of the Militärgeschichtliche Mitteilungen, the American historian Gerhard L. Weinberg wrote, "This work will require all who concern themselves with the Third Reich to rethink their own ideas and to reexamine the evidence on which those ideas are based. For any book to do that today is itself a major accomplishment. It would certainly be most unwise for any scholar to ignore the picture of Hitler presented here simply because it does not fit in with his or her own preconceptions".

Zitelmann criticised David Irving in the liberal German weekly Die Zeit on 6 October 1989 by questioning the fact that Irving had said “not without a certain hubris... that he sees no need to pay any mind to the academic debate and research findings of the 'old school historians' he detests". Zitelmann criticised specifically that Irving had deleted the word "extermination camp" from the new edition of his Hitler biography and that he now appeared to share the notions entertained by revisionist historians. "This entire development", as Zitelmann said in Die Zeit, “has so far not been adequately acknowledged and addressed by West German historians". He called on the historians to be more "aggressive" in critically engaging Irving.

In 1991, Zitelmann edited with the Bielefeld-based historian Michael Prinz the anthology Nationalsozialismus und Modernisierung (National-Socialism and Modernisation; Darmstadt: Wissenschaftliche Buchgesellschaft). On 19 September 1991, Die Zeit read, “The evidence presented here to substantiate the modernisation dynamics of National Socialism is impressive, and they underline how misleading a one-sided view of national-socialism from the perspective of the 'blood and soil' romanticism would be; the latter having been widely spread, and having essentially contributed to an underrating of National Socialism". The reviewer also criticises that the book's contributing authors had exceeded their mark and should have given more attention to the party's art policy, for instance. "The problem of National Socialism and modernisation is therefore not to be resolved with a simple formula. It needs to be constantly reconsidered and to be illuminated from various angles".

=== Historicising National Socialism ===
Zitelmann provoked a mixed reaction with his anthology Die Schatten der Vergangenheit (The Shadows of the Past), which he edited with Eckhard Jesse and Uwe Backes. Its editors sought to respond to Martin Broszat's 1985 call to historicise National Socialism. As the editors emphasize in their introduction, their goal was the "objectification of the discussion of National Socialist times.... The intention is not to 'downplay' anything: only an emphatically sober historiography, free of moralising bias, can create the foundation for assessing the historical and political-moral dimensions of the mass crimes committed by National Socialism." Zitelmann thinks that the historisation of National Socialism suggested by Martin Broszat was a way to resolve the problem of neither engaging in apologetics about the era or nor utterly condemning it. Zitelmann sees his work as a way of allowing those living in the present to understand the Nazi period without seeking to total condemnation or apologia.

In line with their program to treat the time between 1933 and 1945 as scientifically as any other epoch, the book gathered a wide spectrum of authors, from the conservative Ernst Nolte, who again commented on the so-called historians' dispute, to the liberal Imanuel Geiss, a disciple of Fritz Fischer.

As the historian Peter Brandt wrote in Die Welt on 2 October 1990, "The editors have presented a useful book with many important contributions". However, he added, " criticism that could be raised is that—in spite of the emphasis on keeping out any 'extra-scientific' influences—a prejudice against the supposed 'popular pedagogy' treatment of national-socialism had guided the editors' and some of the authors' pen". Brandt stated, however, that the editors deserved total agreement "as they reject any kind of ban on asking questions". The historian Brigitte Seebacher noted in the Rheinischer Merkur on 5 October 1990, “In short, this volume casts light on the national-socialist epoch, and inspires a renewed discussion of how to deal with it correctly". In the 6 November 1990 issue of the Süddeutsche Zeitung, the historian Gregor Schöllgen argued: "Some of the essays will (and should) provoke disagreement. Taken as a whole, this meritorious volume represents an unorthodox contribution toward objectifying the discussion of national-socialism, and one ought to take note of it". The Frankfurter Allgemeine Zeitung of 23 November 1990 commented that the book was "perfectly suitable to become the subject of dispute.... If it failed to meet this mark, then it would above all be for the reason that only a few readers will be likely to manage to digest the heavy academic fare of the first eighty pages". The review praised Zitelmann's discussion of the historian Ernst Nolte: “Exemplary in its objectivity is Rainer Zitelmann's discussion of Ernst Nolte. Zitelmann points out analogies with Marxist theories on fascism, and suggests that it is impermissible to pinpoint 'anti-Bolshevism in a one-sided and generalising manner' as the central motive of 'the' National Socialists".

Zitelmann also wrote on the subject of Umgang mit der NS-Vergangenheit (dealing with the National Socialist past) in his contribution for the book Bewusstseinsnotstand. Thesen von 60 Zeitzeugen ("The Perceptual State of Emergency: Hypotheses by 60 Historic Witnesses"), edited by Rolf Italiaander (Droste-Verlag, 1990). In 1990, Wissenschaftliche Buchgesellschaft published another anthology, edited by Zitelmann with the American historian Ronald Smelser. It offered 22 portraits of the Third Reich's leading figures. Like Zitelmann's doctoral dissertation, the anthology, which combined authors from several countries, was also translated to English, under The Nazi Elite (New York: NYUP, 1993). Reviews were found, for instance, in the Süddeutsche Zeitung of 4 September 1990.

== Historikerstreit ==
During the Historikerstreit between 1986 and 1988, Zitelmann was a strong defender of Andreas Hillgruber and Ernst Nolte. The preface to the second edition in 1988 of his 1987 book Adolf Hitler Selbstverständnis eines Revolutionärs included a lengthy attack on the critics of Nolte and Hillgruber. In an interview with the Swedish historian Alf W. Johansson in November 1992, Zitelmann stated that the Historikerstreit ended with the defeat of the right-wing historians and the triumph of the "left-liberal" historians. Zitelmann went on to state, "Politically, this means that the conservatives are rather defensive and are not united". Zitelmann argued "that has more to do with academic conditions than with the intellectual situation in Germany where now, naturally a few years after the Historians' Controversy, there is in reality a certain change, since the Leftish intellectual circles are no longer on the offensive, but, to the contrary, they find themselves in increasing difficulties".

== Criticism of Adenauer ==
In 1991, Zitelmann's book Adenauers Gegner. Streiter für die Einheit ("Adenauer’s Opponents: Fighters for Unity") came out and was published as paperback by Ullstein under the title Demokraten für Deutschland ("Democrats for Germany") in 1993. As the Social-Democratic politician Erhard Eppler wrote in the preface, "Zitelmann's study illustrates that Adenauer's opponents were no dreamers out of touch with reality but had solid arguments and concepts to present". The book portrays the German Social-Democratic politicians Kurt Schumacher and Gustav Heinemann as well as the Christian Democrat politician Jakob Kaiser, the liberal politician Thomas Dehler, and the journalist Paul Sethe. On 7 October 1991, the German daily Die tageszeitung ("taz") wrote, "The book comes in the nick of time—precisely because it does not join in the supposedly up-to-date chorus of Adenauer enthusiasts". The Social Democratic politician Peter Glotz wrote in Die Welt on 24 April 1991 that Zitelmann's book showed "that Adenauer’s critics had valid arguments when accusing him of finding Europe more important than reunification". The Social Democratic politician Egon Bahr wrote in Der Tagesspiegel of 28 July 1991, "What was later called the lived lie of the Federal Republic can be traced in its inception in Zitelmann's book".

That Zitelmann's sympathies went toward Thomas Dehler, rather than Konrad Adenauer, was evident during an academic panel on 8 December 1997 at which he gave a lecture on occasion of the hundredth anniversary of Dehler's birth. The symposium, organised by the Haus der Geschichte der Bundesrepublik Deutschland in co-operation with the liberals’ parliamentary group, was documented in the conference notes and titled Thomas Dehler und seine Politik (Thomas Dehler and His Politics, Berlin: Nicolai Verlag, 1998). Aside from Zitelmann's contribution, Thomas Dehler und Konrad Adenauer, the volume contains contributions by the liberal politicians Hermann Otto Solms, Wolfgang Mischnick and Hans-Dietrich Genscher.

== The Wealth Elite and the Psychology of the Super-Rich ==
In 2017, Zitelmann’s study on ultrarich individuals with assets in the tens and hundreds of millions was published as The Wealth Elite: A Groundbreaking Study of the Psychology of the Super-Rich, which was based in part on in-depth interviews with 45 exceptionally-wealthy individuals. The study took the form of a qualitative social science study, as there are too few representative cohorts for a quantitative study of the super-rich.

== Films by and with Rainer Zitelmann ==
- Life Behind the Berlin Wall (Awarded the “Audience Choice Award for Short Films” at the Anthem Film Festival 2022)
- Poland: From Socialism to Prosperity
- Vietnam - Beating Poverty with Market Economy (Awarded the Anthem Film Festival Best International Documentary Award)
- What Sweden Got Right (Awarded the Anthem Film Festival Best International Short Documentary)

== Books ==
- The Nazi Elite, New York Univ Pr, New York 1993, ISBN 978-0-81477-950-7.
- Hitler: The Policies of Seduction, Allison & Busby, London 2000, ISBN 978-1-90280-903-8.
  - New edition: Hitler's National Socialism. Management Books 2000, Oxford 2022, ISBN 978-1-852-52790-7. Updated version with a preface: On the Recent Historiography of Hitler and National Socialism (1996-2020).
- Dare to be Different and Grow Rich, Indus Source Books, Mumbai 2012, ISBN 978-8-18856-937-3.
- The Wealth Elite: A groundbreaking study of the psychology of the super rich, Lid Publishing, London and New York 2018, ISBN 978-1-91149-868-1.
- The Power of Capitalism: A Journey Through Recent History Across Five Continents, Lid Publishing, London and New York 2018, ISBN 978-1-91255-500-0.
- Dare to be Different and Grow Rich: The Secrets of Self-Made People, Lid Publishing, London and New York 2019, ISBN 978-1-91255-567-3.
- The Art of a Successful Life: The Wisdom of the Ages from Confucius to Steve Jobs., Lid Publishing, London and New York 2020, ISBN 978-1-91255-567-3.
- The Rich in Public Opinion: What We Think When We Think about Wealth, Cato Institute, Washington 2020, ISBN 978-1-94864-767-0.
- How People Become Famous: Geniuses of Self-Marketing from Albert Einstein to Kim Kardashian, Management Books 2000, Gloucestershire 2021, ISBN 978-1-85252-789-1.
- In Defense of Capitalism, Republic Book Publishers, 2023, ISBN 978-1-64572-073-7
- El Odio a Los Ricos, El Mercurio, Santiago 2023, ISBN 978-956-6260-05-9 (with Axel Kaiser).
- Unbreakable Spirit, Atlas Elite Publishing, 2023, ISBN 978-1-962825-04-7
- How Nations Escape Poverty, Encounter Books, 2024, ISBN 978-1-64177-395-9
- The Origins of Poverty and Wealth, Management Books 2000, 2025, ISBN 978-1-85252-795-2
- 2075 - When Beauty Became a Crime, Management Books 2000, 2026,ISBN 978-1-85252-796-9
- New Space Capitalism: The Entrepreneurial Path to the Stars, Skyhorse Publishing, 2026, ISBN 978-1-5107-8822-0.

== Awards ==
- 2022 Anthem Film Festival, "Audience Choice Award" for the movie "Life Behind the Berlin Wall"
- 2025 Anthem Film Festival, "Best International Documentary" for the movie "Vietnam. Beating Poverty with Market Economy"
- Publicity Award 2025 “Innovator of the Year”
- Nominated for the Hayek Book Prize of the Manhattan Institute 2025 for the book “How Nations Escape Poverty”
- 2026 Anthem Film Festival, "Best International Short Documentary" for the movie "What Sweden Got Right"
