= Alexandra Benado =

Chilean football player and manager, politician and LGBT rights activist

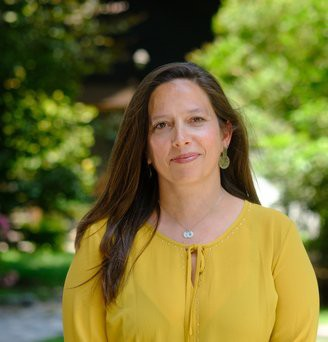

Minister of Sports
- In office 11 March 2022 – 10 March 2023
- President: Gabriel Boric
- Preceded by: Cecilia Pérez
- Succeeded by: Jaime Pizarro

Personal details
- Born: Alexandra Benado Vergara; 11 May 1976 (age 50) Stockholm, Sweden
Association football career
- Height: 1.57 m (5 ft 2 in)
- Position: Midfielder
Senior career*
Years	Team	Apps	(Gls)
1993	Sportivo Milano de Colina		
1994–????	Palestino		
20??–2011	Provincial Osorno		
International career
- Chile
- * Club domestic league appearances and goals

Alexandra "Ale" Benado Vergara (born 11 May 1976) is a Chilean politician, LGBT rights activist and former football player and manager. She played as a midfielder and has been a member of the Chile women's national team. From 11 March 2022 to 10 March 2023, she served as Minister of Sports of Chile.

== Early life ==
Benado was born on 11 May 1976 in Stockholm to Chilean parents, a Jewish father and a non-Jewish mother. She lived the following years in France, where she started playing football. Her mother, Lucía Vergara, was a militant of the Revolutionary Left Movement. After Vergara's murder in Chile in 1983, Benado left Europe and moved to Cuba. She settled in Chile in the early 1990s.

== Club career ==
Benado joined Sportivo Milano de Colina in 1993. She moved to CD Palestino the following year. She retired from her playing career following an injury prior the 2003 South American Women's Football Championship. However, she came out of retirement in September 2009, after Spanish football manager Marta Tejedor, who was coaching the Chile women's national team, requested her to come back and be a role model for Chile's next generation players, including Christiane Endler and Yanara Aedo. She was playing for Provincial Osorno until her definitive retirement in 2011.

== International career ==
Benado represented Chile at the 2010 South American Women's Football Championship.

== Personal life ==
Benado is openly lesbian.
