= Grenoble Institute of Political Studies =

Social sciences school in Grenoble, France

Coordinates: 45°11′29″N 5°46′12″E

- Institut d'études politiques de Grenoble
- Other names: Sciences Po Grenoble; IEPG
- Type: Grande école Institut d'études politiques (public research university Political Science school)
- Established: 1948; 78 years ago
- Parent institution: Université Grenoble Alpes
- Affiliations: Conférence des grandes écoles Instituts d'études politiques
- Budget: €13 million
- Director: Sabine SAURUGGER
- Academic staff: 170
- Students: 1800
- Undergraduates: 1200
- Postgraduates: 600
- Location: Saint-Martin-d'Hères, Grenoble, France
- Campus: Suburban
- Mascot: Yeti
- Website: www.sciencespo-grenoble.fr

The Grenoble Institute of Political Studies (French: Institut d'études politiques de Grenoble, French: [ɛ̃stity detyd pɔlitik də ɡʁənɔbl], abbr. IEPG), also known as Sciences Po Grenoble (French: [sjɑ̃s po ɡʁənɔbl]), is a French "grande école" of political science and more broadly of social sciences located in the campus of the University of Grenoble in Grenoble, France. It is administratively a subsidiary of the Université Grenoble Alpes.

== General information ==
The Institut d'études politiques of Grenoble was founded in 1948 on the model of Sciences Po Paris with the mission of providing France with public and private sector executives as well as specialists in the different fields of the social sciences. Its courses and degrees are modeled under the supervision of the National Foundation of Political Sciences. Since May 2012, Jean-Charles Froment has held the position of president (the former president was Olivier Ihl).

Sciences Po institutes are Grandes Écoles, a French institution of higher education that is separate from, but parallel and connected to the main framework of the French public university system. Similar to the Ivy League in the United States, Oxbridge in the UK, and C9 League in China, Grandes Écoles are elite academic institutions that admit students through an extremely competitive process. The selection rates at these schools are frequently less than 10%. Alums go on to occupy elite positions within government, administration, and corporate firms in France.

Although these institutes are more expensive than public universities in France, Grandes Écoles typically have much smaller class sizes and student bodies, and many of their programs are taught in English. International internships, study abroad opportunities, and close ties with government and the corporate world are a hallmark of the Grandes Écoles. Many of the top ranked schools in Europe are members of the Conférence des Grandes Écoles (CGE), as are the Sciences Po institutes.

The institute is modeled on the former École Libre des Sciences Politiques, and as such, Sciences Po specializes in political science, but uses an interdisciplinary approach to education that provides student generalists with the high level of grounding in skills that they need in History, Law, Economic Sciences, Sociology, Political science and International relations. The academic course lasts five years, and it is a three-year undergraduate programme and a two-year graduate programme and the primary diploma is a master's degree. The third year of the curriculum is a year of mobility abroad, and students can spend two semesters in a foreign university, one semester in a university and one semester internship or they also have the opportunity to spend two semesters as a trainee. Years 4 and 5 are for specialization. Degrees from Sciences Po are accredited by the Conférence des Grandes Écoles and awarded by the Ministry of National Education (France) (French: Le Ministère de L'éducation Nationale).

== Admission ==
Alike other IEP (Institutes of Political Science) it differs from the bulk of French universities by its elitist nature - having a selective entrance exam, and the plural-disciplinary curriculum it provides its students with. This highly selective undergraduate entrance exam has a typical acceptance rate of no more than 12% (it was around 11% in 2011). Because of this Sciences Po Grenoble is considered to be a "grande école".

The entrance exam comprises two different tests: The first one is made up of an essay and two short questions on a book chosen by the IEP (In 2014 the book chosen was Maxim Leo's Red Love: The Story of an East German Family; The second test is an English level examination consisting of an essay and a written comprehension.

Of the around 200 students admitted each year, half have just finished high school while the other half have spent a year preparing for the exam after their high school graduation. The IEP also has a special program for admitting underprivileged students and high level athletes which pass the entrance examination and an interview.

== Curriculum ==
The plural-disciplinary curriculum the IEP provides has the objective of giving students a strong knowledge in the different fields of the social sciences and thus equip these students with a large cultural foundation enabling them to be more flexible in adapting themselves no matter the field they decide to work in.

The first 3 years of the Sciences Po Program are the most diverse as courses in Political Science, Economics, Public Law, History, International Relations and Sociology are taught as well as a minimum of two foreign languages. In the second year of the 3 year undergraduate Program IEP students are sent abroad as exchange students and as they come back, specialize in one of the three sections the IEP proposes in the 3rd year of its curriculum. Following the 3rd year, students must choose and be accepted into the masters program they desire - which lasts two additional years. Although some students leave the IEP at the term of their 3rd year, new students are admitted from other universities at the masters level.

The IEP has only 1200 students : 800 "diploma" students (following the main course in 5 years: the Diploma of the IEP), 250 postgraduate students and 150 foreign students. The means of the IEP are nonetheless sizeable. Both in terms of staff (170 teachers, 65 researchers) and resources (there are twice as many computers in the IEP as in the neighbouring Grenoble II University).

While the IEP of Bordeaux is prominent for its training of high-ranking civil servants, and the IEP of Lille for its specialty in International Relations, the IEP of Grenoble is renowned for its different masters programs in political science, middle eastern studies and international relations. The IEP-Grenoble is home to the Centre d'Informatisation des Données Socio-Politiques (CIDSP), one of the most dynamic research centres in political science in France. Grenoble is also known for its studies in cultural policies, European policies, private and public management.

== Faculty and career ==
Several of the IEP's teachers are well known in France and abroad. Jean-Louis Quermonne, now an honorary teacher, is one of the leading political scientists in France. Pierre Bréchon, former director of the IEP and head of the CIDSP is a French specialist of quantitative studies.

Many professors are non-academics who come with their professional from diverse professional backgrounds. This is especially the case for Masters level classes which are taught in coordination with other schools, among which the well established business school Grenoble école de management or the Grenoble School of Journalism.

Alumni from the IEP have various careers. The IEP has a broad curriculum which can lead to a diversity many professional paths. Grenoble alumni include politicians, lawyers, high-ranking civil servants, executives, entrepreneurs and even artists.

== Miscellaneous ==
In 2012, the school administration banned all parties in the beginning the school year because of repeated hazing incidents that had occurred the preceding years (involving alcohol-induced comas and sexual assaults).

== Notable staff ==
- Pr. Olivier Ihl, political scientist

== Notable alumni ==
- Louis Besson, former Minister of Public Works
- Christophe Caresche, member of National Assembly of France
- Michel Destot, former mayor of Grenoble, member of National Assembly of France
- Marc Dugain, novelist
- Olivier Dussopt, Minister of Labour, member of National Assembly of France, mayor of Annonay
- Frédéric Encel, political scientist
- Cary Joji Fukunaga, American filmmaker
- Jean-Dominique Merchet, journalist
- Nathan Méténier, climate activist and founder of Generation Climate Europe
- Alain Rodet, former mayor of Limoges, member of National Assembly of France
- André Vallini, Minister, former senator
- Flore Vasseur, film director, screenwriter, film producer, novelist, journalist and entrepreneur.

== International partners ==
The IEP Grenoble has a wide international outreach (considering its small size) with a hundred partner universities around the world, among which the University of Edinburgh, New York University, the University of North Carolina, Trinity College Dublin, Waseda University, Sophia University, Bologna University, the University of British Columbia and many others. Most students spend a full year abroad where they earn credits that are fully part of their curriculum.
