= Guillermo Mackenna =

Chilean lawyer

President of Blanco y Negro S.A.
- In office 15 March 2010 – 8 March 2011
- Preceded by: Gabriel Ruíz-Tagle
- Succeeded by: Hernán Levy

Personal details
- Born: 1974 (age 51–52) Santiago, Chile
- Children: Four
- Education: Gabriela Mistral University (LL.B); Northwestern University (LL.M)
- Profession: Lawyer

Guillermo Mackenna (born 1974) is a Chilean lawyer who served as the president of Blanco y Negro from March 2010 to March 2011.

In 2018, he was proposed as candidate for being member of the Patrimonial Court of the Asociación Nacional de Fútbol Profesional (ANFP), which was dismissed.
