= Eugenio González Astudillo =

Chilean politician and lobbyist

Eugenio González Astudillo, also known as "El Pingüino", is a Chilean politician and lobbyist of the Socialist Party of Chile. In the 1980s during the Pinochet dictatorship he worked as political scientist for the Ministry of Foreign Affairs.

González is known for being a high-level dealmaker and has close links with influential politicians such as Adolfo Zaldívar, Camilo Escalona, Alejandro Navarro and Guido Girardi.

In 2020 he sued radio commentator Tomás Mosciatti of Radio Bío-Bío for libel. González demands over one million US dollars in compensation, more than enough to bring Radio Bío-Bío to bankruptcy. Political commentator Fernando Villegas said of the lawsuit that he had once also faced a lawsuit from well-connected politicians who disliked his commentary. Reportedly the incident originated from Mosciatti's and Radio Bío-Bío coverage and commentary on political controversy between Felipe Harboe and González.
