= Ministry of Sports (Chile) =

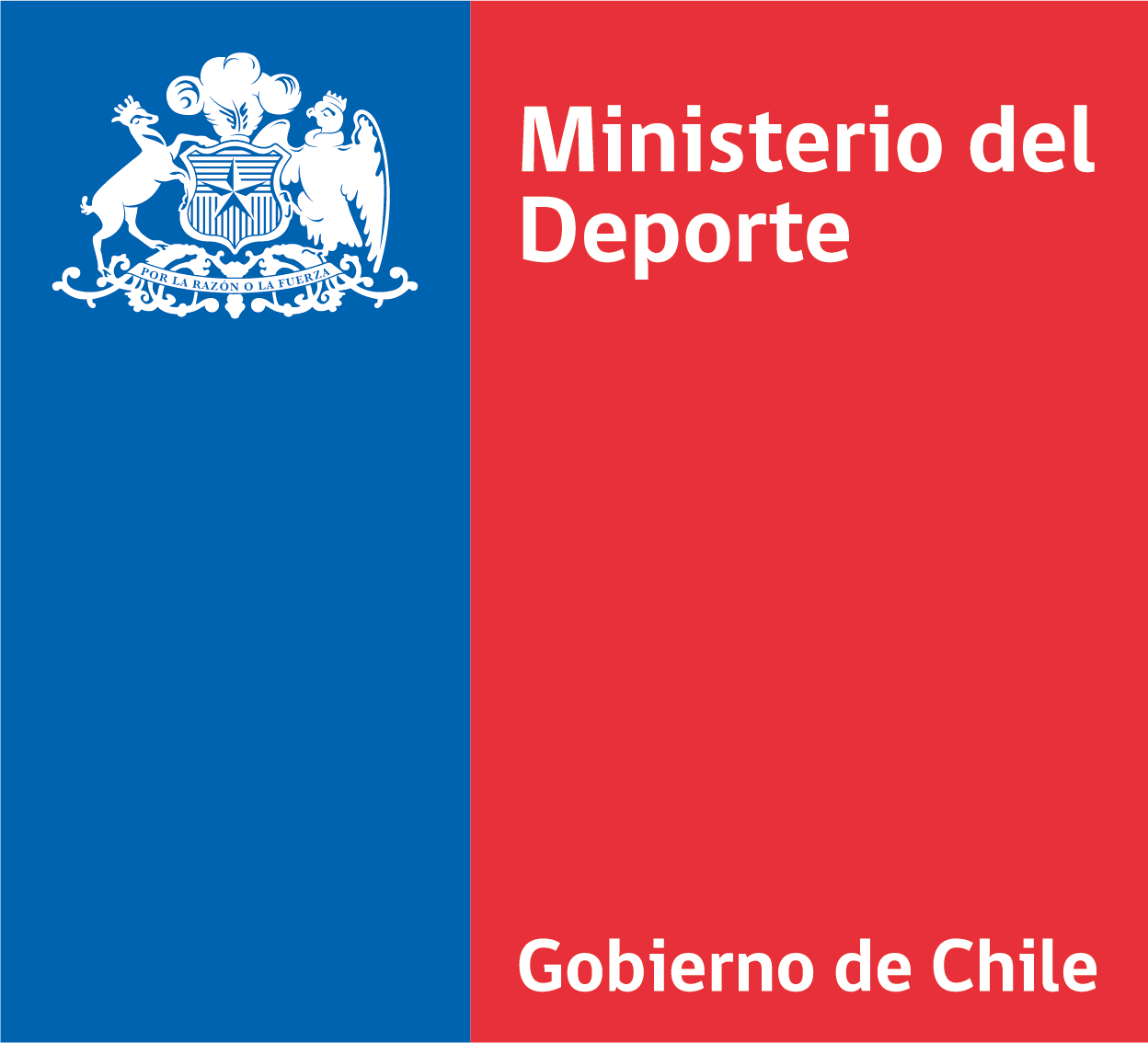
Logo of the Ministry of Sports

The Ministry of Sports (Spanish: Ministerio del Deporte) is an institution created in 2013 by then-President of Chile, Sebastián Piñera, during his first government (2010–2014).

Its first minister was Gabriel Ruíz-Tagle. Since 14 August 2026, the minister is Francisco Riveros.

== List of ministers of sports ==
Picture	Name	Entered office	Exited office	Notes	Appointed by
	Gabriel Ruiz-Tagle	14 November 2013	11 March 2014	UDI	Sebastián Piñera
	Natalia Riffo	11 March 2014	18 November 2016	MAS Region	Michelle Bachelet
	Pablo Squella	18 November 2016	11 March 2018	Ind	Michelle Bachelet
	Pauline Kantor	11 March 2018	28 October 2019	Ind	Sebastián Piñera
	Cecilia Pérez	28 October 2019	11 March 2022	RN	Sebastián Piñera
	Alexandra Benado	11 March 2022	10 March 2023	Ind	Gabriel Boric
	Jaime Pizarro	10 March 2023	11 March 2026	Ind	Gabriel Boric
	Natalia Duco	11 March 2026	14 August 2026	Ind.	José Antonio Kast
	Francisco Riveros	14 August 2026	Incumbent	Ind.	José Antonio Kast
