= Aníbal Mosa =

Chilean entrepreneur

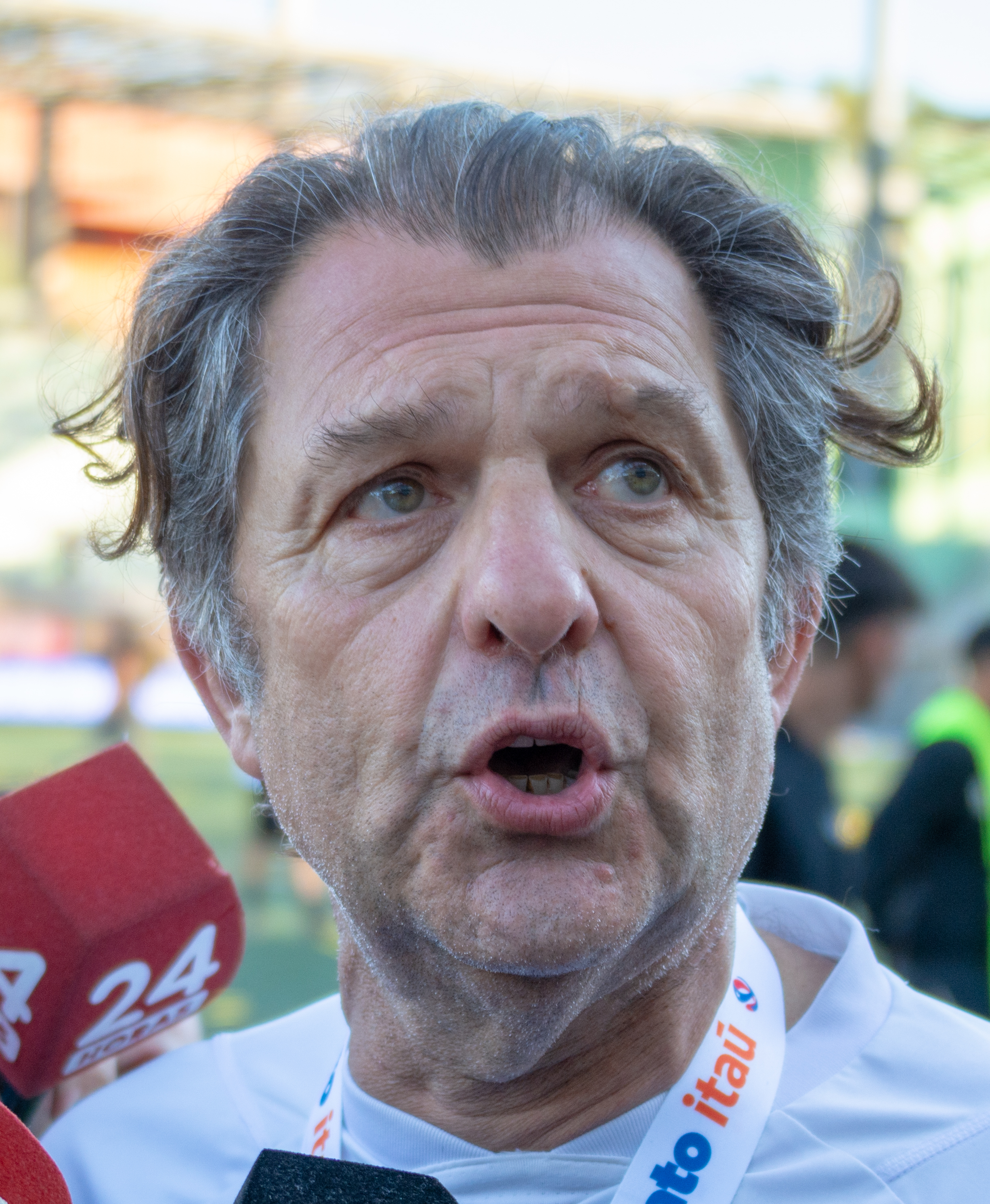
- Mosa in 2024

President of Blanco y Negro S.A.
- Incumbent
- Assumed office 26 April 2024
- Preceded by: Alfredo Stohwing
- In office 29 April 2019 – 21 April 2021
- Preceded by: Gabriel Ruíz-Tagle
- Succeeded by: Edmundo Valladares
- In office 24 April 2015 – 4 January 2018
- Preceded by: Arturo Salah
- Succeeded by: Gabriel Ruíz-Tagle

Personal details
- Born: 6 April 1967 (age 59) Qamishli, Syria
- Party: Close to Socialist Party
- Parent(s): Assisi Meuse; Amal Schmes
- Occupation: Entrepreneur

Yakob Aníbal Mosa Shmes (born 6 April 1967) is a Syrian-born Chilean entrepreneur who served as the president of Blanco y Negro S.A. board concessionaire that manages the Club Social y Deportivo Colo-Colo.

== Biography ==
Mosa immigrated from Qamishli in Syria to Chile with his family when he was six years old. In late 2010, Mosa bought a 12.5% stake in Blanco y Negro after acquiring the share dividends auctioned by then newly-elected President Sebastián Piñera.

== Political views ==
Mosa is openly progressivist. His parents Assisi Meuse and Amal Schmes were members of the Baath Arab Socialist Party. In August 2019, he declared his admiration for former President Michelle Bachelet, whom he described as a "heritage of Chilean democracy".
