= Líder =

Retail chain in Chile

- Type: Sociedad Anónima Abierta
- Industry: Retail (Grocery), Hypermarket, Retail, Clothing, Electronics
- Founded: Santiago de Chile (1893)
- Headquarters: Avenida Presidente Eduardo Frei Montana 8301, Quilicura, Santiago de Chile
- Number of locations: 251
- Key people: Felipe Ibáñez Scott, Nicolás Ibáñez Scott
- Products: bakery, dairy, deli, frozen foods, grocery, lottery, meat, pharmacy, produce, seafood, snacks, liquor, clothing, electronics
- Revenue: $57.370 billion CLP
- Number of employees: ~12,000
- Parent: Walmart (2009–present)
- Website: www.lider.cl

Líder (Spanish for Leader) is a Chilean hypermarket chain originally owned and operated by Distribución y Servicio (DyS) and sold to American corporation Walmart in 2009.

== Overview ==
There are 251 Líders in the Republic of Chile including the original hypermarket (97) in addition to the express (154) concepts complemented by the Lider.cl website.

The stores sell groceries, home electronics, school supplies, toys, tools and home supplies. Like its parent company Walmart, most Lider stores also have a small indoor strip mall, usually featuring fast food.

== History ==
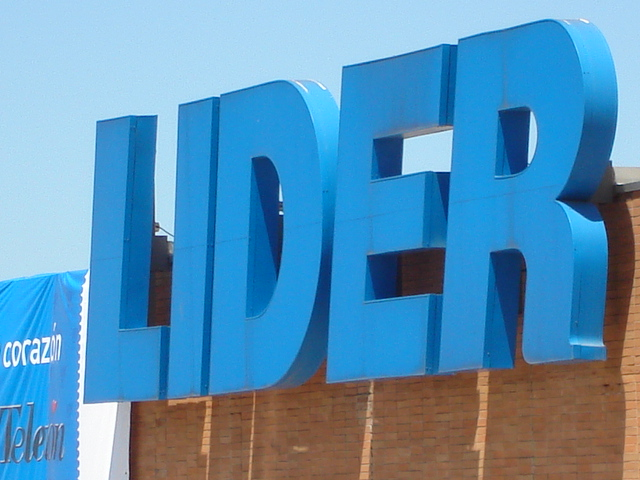
Líder store signage until November 2011.

Líder's origins lie in the 1893 establishment of Distribución y Servicio (D y S) as an important distribution company. That company opened the Tres Montes general store in 1921. In 1957, the company opened Latin America's first supermarket in Santiago, Chile followed by the opening Ekono a discount supermarket in 1984. In 1995, the Líder hypermarket was born and was followed by the Líder Vecino neighborhood markets and Líder Express concepts in 2000 and 2003 respectively. The company added a membership warehouse store in 2007.

The company was acquired by Walmart in 2009. Walmart purchased a 58.3% share in the D y S company with the remainder in the hands of the Ibáñez Scott brothers. In addition to this Walmart has followed up with an offer to purchase the remaining stock from the brothers. The company divested from any Cuban products like rum due to the embargo on Cuban products between the United States and any American company or subsidiary causing a consumer outcry and legal hurdle for Walmart since this violates Chilean free market and competition laws.

Líder stores began selling Cuban products in addition to products from countries banned in the United States at half price to eliminate them from stock before the merger was complete. This caused a buying frenzy of Cuban rum that made headlines. This also caused an uproar from the public that was accustomed to certain products from certain countries. The largest retailing in the country no longer importing certain goods will certainly raise the price. Competitor Jumbo was inspired to begin a publicity campaign that they did not discriminate in their product selection by nationality. In fact, several members of the National Congress of Chile wrote a bill that would make it illegal to discriminate merchandise by country of origin. The Chilean authorities have stated that individual companies have wide latitude in determining what products they do and do not sell and why, however some in congress have insisted this move violates fair competition laws.

Líder logo used from 2011 to present.

All Líder stores are unionized and offer full benefits. The takeover by Walmart has made union leaders anxious due to Walmart's reputation for union busting. Líder stores also employ child labor, bagging groceries; they must however be in school, according to the Labor Code.

The company competes with Cencosud's Jumbo and Santa Isabel supermarkets, SMU's Unimarc, as well as the smaller Tottus.
