= Radio Bío-Bío =

Radio station in Chile

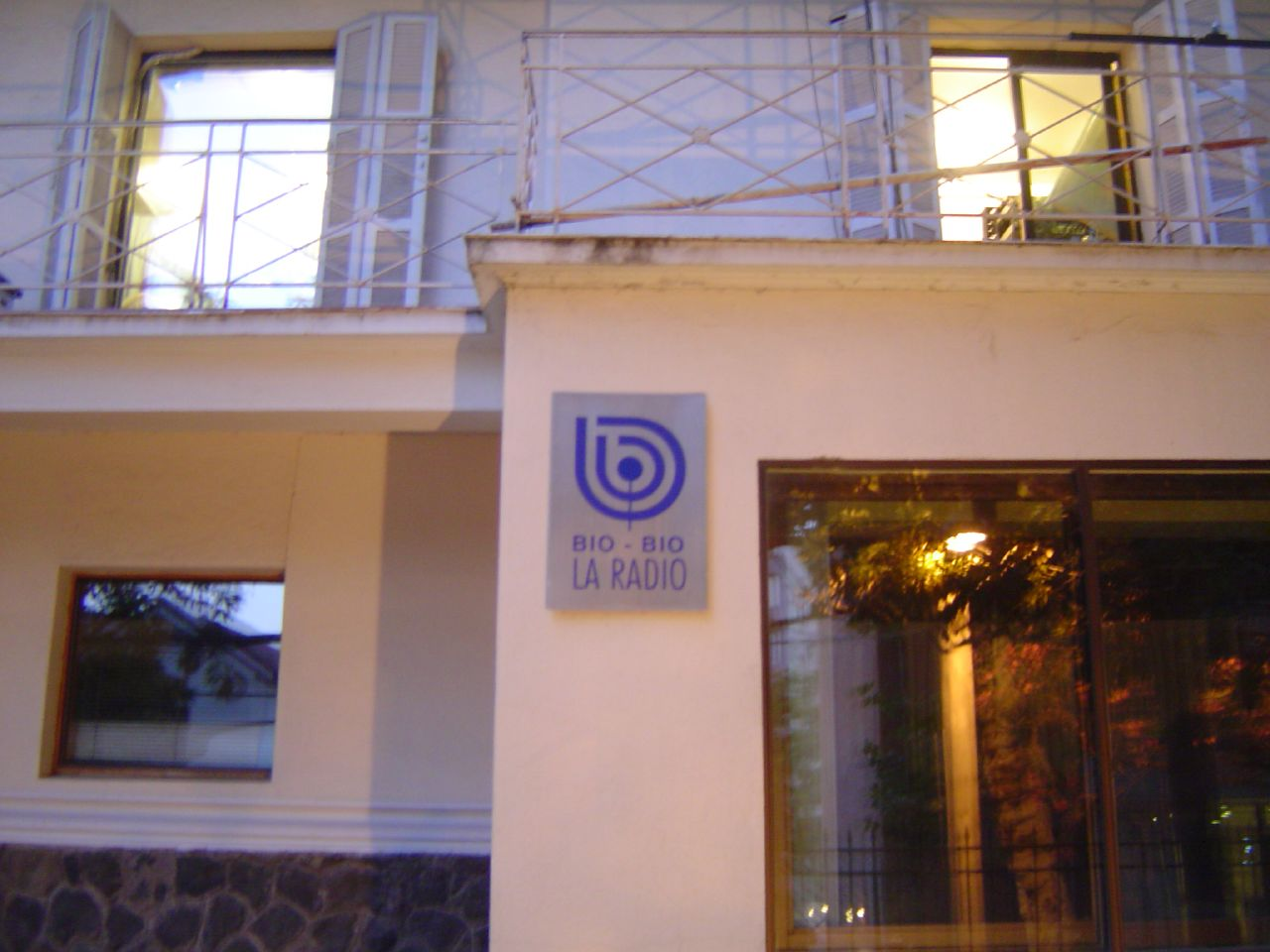
- Concepción Santiago Valparaíso Los Ángeles Lonquimay Temuco Valdivia Osorno Puerto Montt; Chile
- Broadcast area: Chile
- Frequencies: 98.1 MHz/620 kHz (Greater Concepción); 92.7 MHz (Arica); 96.9 MHz (Iquique); 100.7 MHz (Calama); 93.5 MHz (Antofagasta); 96.9 MHz (Caldera); 97.3 MHz (Copiapó); 89.7 MHz (Vallenar); 90.5 MHz (La Serena/Coquimbo); 101.1 MHz (Ovalle); 103.5 MHz (Los Andes/San Felipe); 94.5 MHz (Greater Valparaíso); 88.5 MHz (Juan Fernández Islands); 93.5 MHz (Casablanca); 106.1 MHz (San Antonio); 99.7 MHz (Santiago); 95.1 MHz (Curacaví); 89.9 MHz (Melipilla); 99.9 MHz (Rancagua); 100.3 MHz (Vichuquén); 98.5 MHz (Curicó); 106.1 MHz (Constitución); 96.9 MHz (Talca); 97.3 MHz (Longaví/Parral); 105.3 MHz (Chillán); 97.7 MHz (Cañete); 103.5 MHz (Lebu); 96.7 MHz (Los Ángeles); 99.7 MHz (Angol); 101.5 MHz (Lonquimay); 88.1 MHz (Temuco); 103.7 MHz (Pucón); 88.5 MHz (Villarrica); 88.9 MHz (Valdivia); 91.5 MHz (Los Lagos); 106.5 MHz (Osorno); 88.9 MHz (Puerto Varas); 94.9 MHz (Puerto Montt); 99.3 MHz (Ancud); 89.3 MHz (Castro); 93.7 MHz (Quellón); 90.3 MHz (Coyhaique); 105.1 MHz (Punta Arenas)

Programming
- Language: Spanish
- Format: Informative
- Affiliations: Independent

Ownership
- Owner: Bío-Bío Comunicaciones

History
- First air date: April 24, 1966

Links
- Website: www.biobiochile.cl

Radio Bío-Bío is a Chilean radio station with broad coverage in Chile. It covers news, sports, music, economics, and international relations.

The station was founded in 1966 in Concepción. In the 1990s it began to expand across the country. The first additional stations were in southern Chile in Temuco, Osorno and Puerto Montt, and Santiago in 1997. One of the main stations is operated in Lonquimay in the Cordillera of the Andes in the Araucanía Region. This station, Bío Bío Lonquimay, was established in 1995 in an isolated area and provides radio service for a mainly indigenous community.

Today, Radio Bio-Bio operates on 40 frequencies around the country, with 8 autonomous stations nationwide. It is the only completely independent station, not affiliated with any political, religious or economic groups.

In July 2020 Eugenio González sued Radio Bío Bío commentator Tomás Mosciatti for libel. González demands over one million US dollars in compensation, more than enough to bring Radio Bío-Bío to bankruptcy.
