= Fulvio Rossi =

Chilean politician

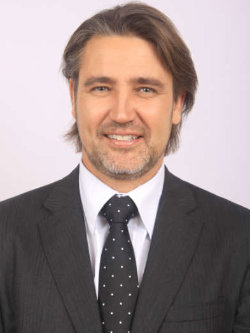

Member of the Senate
- In office 11 March 2010 – 11 March 2018
- Preceded by: Fernando Flores
- Succeeded by: Dissolution of the District
- Constituency: 1st District

Member of the Chamber of Deputies
- In office 11 March 2002 – 11 March 2010
- Preceded by: Jorge Soria Machiavello
- Succeeded by: Hugo Gutiérrez Gálvez
- Constituency: 2nd District

President of the Pontifical Catholic University of Chile Students Federation
- In office 1994–1995
- Preceded by: Alberto Undurraga
- Succeeded by: Alejandro San Francisco

Personal details
- Born: 30 September 1970 (age 56) Iquique, Chile
- Party: Socialist Party; Amarillos por Chile
- Education: Pontifical Catholic University of Chile
- Occupation: Politician
- Profession: Physician

Fulvio Fabrizio Rossi Ciocca (born 30 September 1970) is a Chilean politician and physician.

He served as a Senator for the 1st Senatorial District, representing the Arica and Parinacota Region and the Tarapacá Region, between 2010 and 2018.

Previously, he was a Member of the Chamber of Deputies for District No. 2 in the Tarapacá Region, serving two consecutive terms between 2002 and 2010. He is a member of the Amarillos por Chile political movement.

== Early life and education ==
Rossi was born in Iquique on 30 September 1970. He is the son of Flavio Rossi Rossi, an English teacher and city councilor of Iquique (2004–2008 and 2008–2012), and Ángela Ciocca Gómez, a teacher of Spanish language and religion. He was married to Carolina Tohá. He has two children, Franco Paolo and Flavia.

He completed his secondary education at Colegio Don Bosco of Iquique. He obtained his medical degree from the Pontifical Catholic University of Chile (PUC). He later specialized in Orthopedics and Traumatology, Arthroscopic Surgery, and Sports Medicine.

== Professional career ==
Rossi has practiced medicine independently as an orthopedic and trauma surgeon, with a focus on sports medicine.

== Political career ==
Rossi began his political involvement in 1988 as head of the No campaign at the main campus of the Pontifical Catholic University of Chile during the national plebiscite of that year.

During his years as a student, he was elected president of the Student Council of the School of Medicine. During that period, he joined the Socialist Party of Chile (PS), and in 1993 he was elected president of the Student Federation of the PUC (FEUC).

Between 23 January and 21 August 2010, Rossi served as president of the Socialist Party. In 2011, he served as secretary general of the party. In 2009, he was a member of the presidential campaign team of Eduardo Frei Ruiz-Tagle.

On 7 November 2016, Rossi formally resigned from the Socialist Party before the Electoral Service, ending an affiliation that had begun in 1984.

In 2017, he ran as an independent candidate for re-election to the Senate for the 2nd Senatorial District (Tarapacá Region) in the parliamentary elections held in November of that year. Although he received 22,181 votes (24.25% of the total), he was not elected.

In September 2022, Rossi joined the political movement Amarillos por Chile.
