= Gabriel Ruiz-Tagle =

Chilean businessperson and politician

Gabriel Ruíz-Tagle
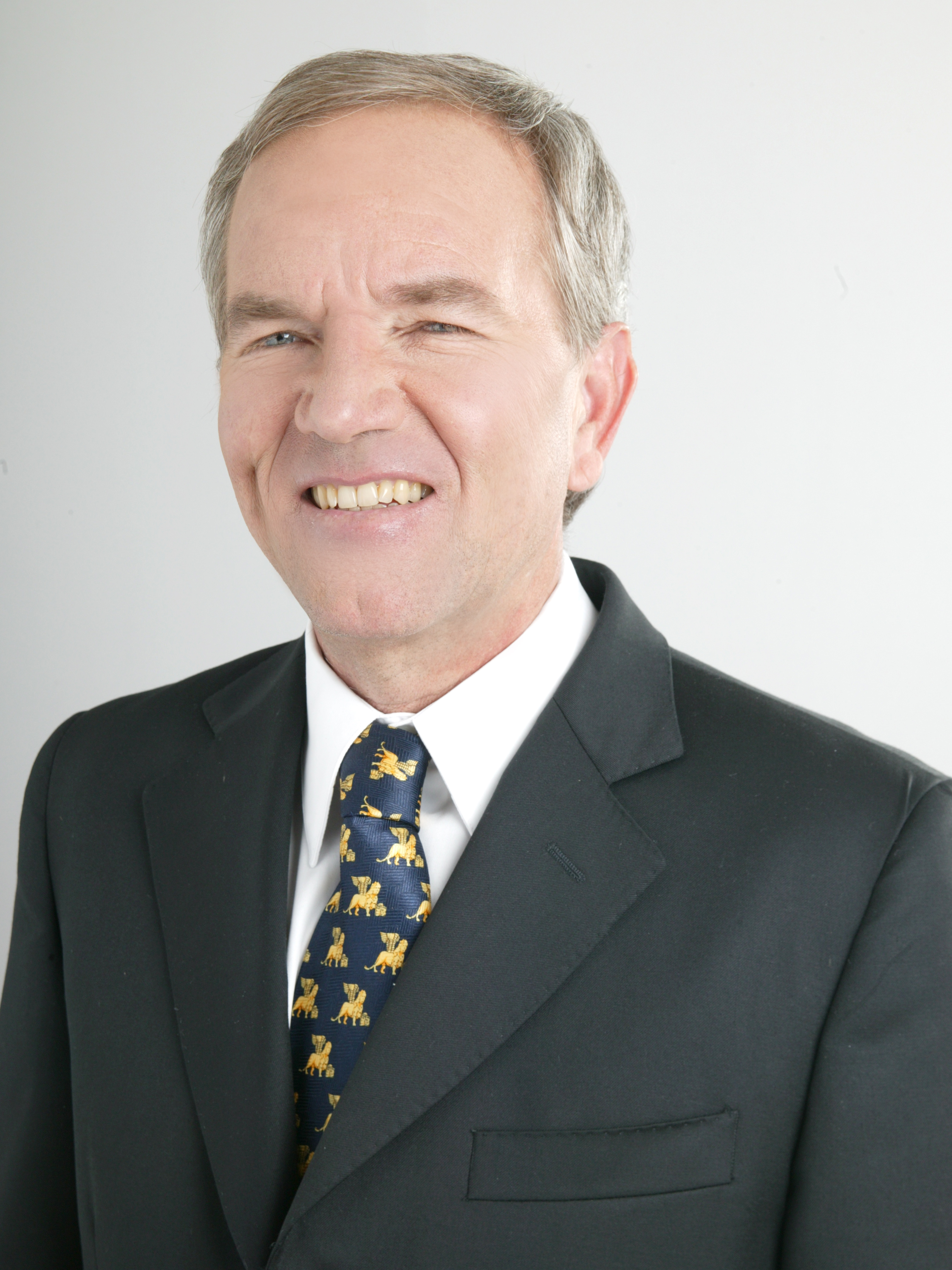
- Official portrait (2010)

President of Blanco y Negro S.A.
- In office 17 April 2018 – 29 April 2019
- Preceded by: Aníbal Mosa
- Succeeded by: Aníbal Mosa
- In office April 2007 – 15 March 2010
- Preceded by: Cristián Varela
- Succeeded by: Guillermo Mackenna

Minister of Sports
- In office 14 November 2013 – 14 March 2014
- Preceded by: Creation of the charge
- Succeeded by: Natalia Riffo

Undersecretary of Sports
- In office 11 March 2010 – 14 November 2013
- Preceded by: Marcela González
- Succeeded by: Eduardo Valenzuela Vaillant

Personal details
- Born: 15 June 1953 (age 73) Santiago, Chile
- Party: Renovación Nacional (RN; 1988–1990); Unión Demócrata Independiente (UDI) (1990–present)
- Spouse: Loreto Barros
- Children: Six
- Education: Pontifical Catholic University of Chile (B.S)
- Profession: Economist

Gabriel Ruiz-Tagle Correa (born 15 June 1953) is a Chilean politician and entrepreneur. He was the first Chilean citizen in serve as Sports Minister during president Sebastián Piñera's first government.

He studied at Pontifical Catholic University of Chile.

He was the main shareholder of Blanco y Negro S.A., Colo-Colo administrative concessionaire. He was also chairman of the concessionaire directors' board between 2007 and 2010.

== Business career ==
In 1973, he co-founded the paper distribution company Dimar (Distribuidora Matte Ruiz-Tagle) together with Arturo Matte Lecaros. In 1978, Ruiz-Tagle sold his stake in Dimar to Matte Lecaros, and, together with Gabriel Navarro, founded another company in the same sector, Papeles Industriales (PISA), which began as a paper importer and later became a paper manufacturing company.

In 2003, 50% of PISA was acquired by the Swedish multinational Svenska Cellulosa Aktiebolaget (SCA) for US$55.3 million.

After serving in Sebastián Piñera’s administration, in 2014 he resumed activities at his investment office, which had been managed by his children during his time in government.

In August 2014, the right-wing digital outlet El Líbero was launched, of which he is co-owner along with Hernán Büchi and lawyer José Antonio Guzmán.

In November 2014, it was announced that he would join as a financial partner of the Ciudad Deportiva Iván Zamorano.

=== Colo-Colo ===
In March 2006, he joined the board of Blanco y Negro S.A. (ByN), the company that administers the football club Colo-Colo, and on 16 November 2006 he became its largest shareholder, with a 24.5% stake.

In April 2007 he assumed the presidency of ByN. Upon being appointed director of Chiledeportes in 2010, he resigned from the club’s presidency, and later that year sold his shares.

In April 2018, he returned to the board of ByN.

== Political career ==
As a member of National Renewal (RN), in 1989 he led the committee that sought to persuade Hernán Büchi, then Minister of Finance, to run as a candidate in the 1989 presidential election. He later joined the Independent Democratic Union (UDI), becoming a member of its Governing Council in December 1994.

In 2005 he served as campaign manager for Pablo Longueira in that year’s parliamentary elections, in which Longueira was elected to the Senate.

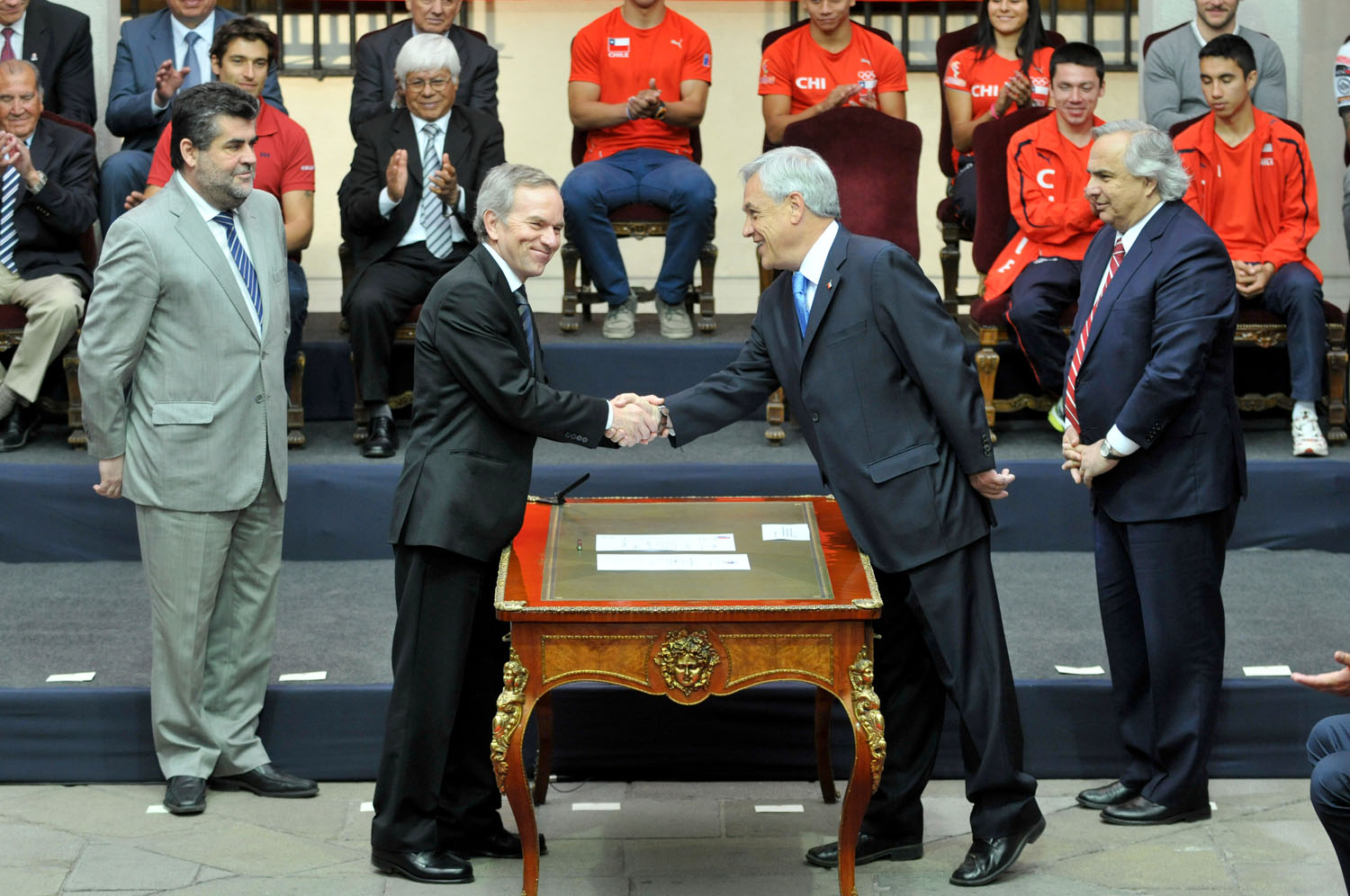
Oath as Minister of Sport in 2013.

On 19 February 2010, he was appointed Undersecretary of Sports (Chiledeportes) by President-elect Sebastián Piñera, stepping down from the presidency of Colo-Colo before taking office on 11 March 2010.

Although he initially stated that he would retain his shares in Blanco y Negro while heading Chiledeportes, following a ruling by the Comptroller General of the Republic establishing that he should refrain from decisions related to football due to concerns regarding administrative probity, he decided to put his shares up for sale in July 2010. The sale was completed on 24 August 2010, when he transferred his stake to Hernán Levy.

On 14 November 2013, he was appointed the first Minister of Sport, following the creation of the ministry by law in August of that year. He remained in office until 11 March 2014, at the end of President Piñera’s term.
