= Gloria Álvarez =

Guatemalan political commentator

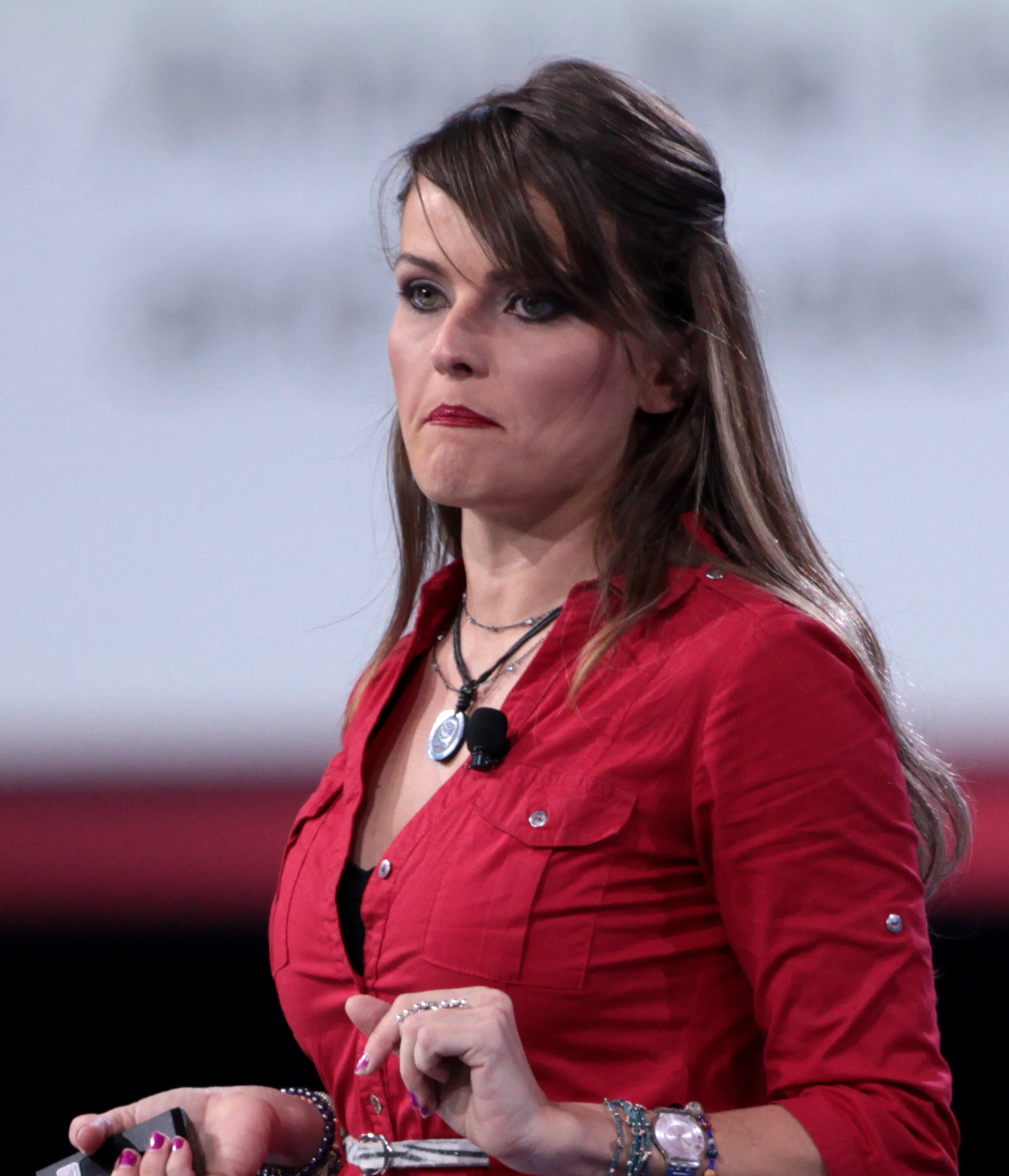
- Álvarez at the Conservative Political Action Conference in 2016
- Born: March 9, 1985 (age 41); Guatemala City, Guatemala
- Occupations: Political commentator; radio talk show host

Academic background
- Education: Universidad Francisco Marroquín; Georgetown University; Katholieke Universiteit Leuven; Sapienza University of Rome; Guatemala School of Government
- Influences: Juan Bautista Alberdi, Ayn Rand, Murray Rothbard, Milton Friedman, FA Hayek and Ludwig Von Mises

Academic work
- Discipline: Political science, Economics
- School or tradition: Right-libertarianism and Objectivism

Gloria Álvarez Cross (born March 9, 1985) is a Guatemalan radio and television presenter, author, and libertarian political commentator. She is the host of the Viernes de Gloria radio program in Guatemala. Álvarez is also the program director of the National Civic Movement of Guatemala, an organization that advocates for political participation in the national politics of Guatemala. She has also published books on political topics for a popular audience.

== Early life ==
Gloria Ivette Álvarez Cross was born in Guatemala City, Guatemala. Her mother Stella Yvette Cross Letona is of Hungarian origin and her Cuban father, José Manuel Álvarez Torriente, is a marketer. Álvarez spent a few of her early years in El Salvador before living in Guatemala for good after the age of 16.

== Education ==
She received a bachelor's degree in International Relations and Political Science from Francisco Marroquin University. She then pursued graduate studies at a series of institutions. She holds a postgraduate degree in Politics and Economics from Georgetown University, a master's degree from Katholieke Universiteit Leuven in Anthropology and International Development, a master's degree in Applied Anthropology from The Sapienza University of Rome, and another master's degree in Public Management from the School of Government in Guatemala City. She also worked as an intern at the Cato Institute. Álvarez speaks Spanish, English, and Italian.

== Career ==
She serves as Director of Communications and Professor at the Universidad de la Libertad of the Centro Ricardo Salinas Pliego.

=== Media presenting ===
Álvarez first presented a radio broadcast in 2005 when she was 19 years old, and went on to become a professional radio presenter for Los 40. She received significantly increased media attention in 2014, after a speech that she gave at the Ibero-American Youth Parliament. Her discourses against populism were particularly noted, since Álvarez argues that populism has caused political instability in many Latin-American countries.

=== Writing ===
Álvarez coauthored her first book, called El Engaño Populista (The Populist Deception), with Axel Kaiser in 2016. The authors argue that several types of deception have been central to the project by left-wing politicians and groups to promote populism, including the Spanish political party Podemos and the Ecuadorian president Rafael Correa. They use the term populism to describe multiple leftist ideologies, including socialism. They write that populist thinking is motivated by a contempt for individual freedom, a fixation on self-identifying with victimhood, an opposition to neoliberalism, and the use of both democratic rhetoric and egalitarian rhetoric to increase the power of the state. The book has been lambasted by Alfredo Joignant in Televisión Nacional de Chile as "not withstanding a pregraduate academic jury".

In 2017 Álvarez wrote a book called ¿Cómo hablar con un progre? ("How to talk to a progressive?"), and in 2018 she wrote a sequel called ¿Cómo hablar con un conservador? ("How to talk to a conservative?"). Both books are directed at libertarians, and aim to teach them how to persuade people of different political ideologies.

=== Political activity ===
Álvarez was a member of the civic organization Movimiento Cívico Nacional, but left the organization in 2017 in response to allegations that the organization's director had received improper payments. She described her departure as necessary to maintain her political principles. In November 2021, the case that led to the resignation of Gloria Álvarez from the Movimiento Cívico Nacional was resolved, proving the innocence of the former director by the Courts.

On March 11, 2019, Álvarez announced that she would run for president in the 2019 Guatemalan general election. However, the National Election Council rejected her application because she was 34 years old and the minimum required age for a candidate for President of Guatemala is 40. She ran on an orthodox libertarian platform, and noted that all the women who had previously been successful in Guatemalan politics had been socialists. Álvarez argued that populist and socialist policies have historically been a cause of democratic breakdowns in Latin America. Her proposals included reductions in government spending such as decreasing the size of the civil service and the repeal of socially conservative laws like the ban on adoption by same-sex couples, but she also proposed significant funding for military and police forces. She suggested that other policy options included the legalization of marijuana, abortion, euthanasia, and prostitution.

During an interview in which Álvarez was asked about the Guatemalan genocide, she replied: "I wouldn't categorize what happened in Guatemala as a genocide (…), actually there's an industry of victimization that benefits from recreating the conflict and because of that we never forgive".

== Publications ==
=== Books ===
- El Engaño Populista (2016, co-authored with Axel Kaiser)
- Cómo Hablar Con Un Progre (2017)
- Cómo Hablar Con Un Conservador (2019)
- Cómo Defender La Libertad y No Suicidarte En El Intento (2025)

=== Other contributions ===
- Prologue for Vida y Mentira de Ernesto Ché Guevara by Fernando Díaz Villanueva
- Prologue for Rebelión de los Mansos by Rogelio López
- Prologue for Capitalismo: Un Antídoto Contra la Pobreza by Antonella Marty
- Contributor to El Manual Liberal

== Awards and recognition ==
- Forbes – 100 Most Powerful Women in Central America (2023)
- Friedrich Hayek Lifetime Achievement Award – Austrian Economics Center, Austria (2018)
- Premio a la Liberdade – Belo Horizonte, Brazil (2016)
- Woman of the Year – Look Magazine Guatemala (2015)
