= El Líbero =

Chilean online newspaper

- Type: Newspaper
- Format: Online
- Founder(s): Hernán Büchi; José Antonio Guzmán; Gabriel Ruíz-Tagle; Eduardo Sepúlveda; Carlos Kubick
- Founded: September 2014; 12 years ago
- Political alignment: Liberal democracy Right-wing
- Language: Spanish
- Website: ellibero.cl

El Líbero is a Chilean online newspaper formed in 2014. Its founders include journalist and former editor of Investigation and Politics of El Mercurio Eduardo Sepúlveda, the commercial engineer Carlos Kubick O., José Antonio Guzmán A., former Chilean minister of sports Gabriel Ruiz-Tagle, and economist Hernán Büchi.

El Líbero currently has 88 shareholders and is a member of the National Press Association (ANP), a conglomerate with 71 years of history that covers the main newspapers in the country. Eduardo Sepúlveda, director at El Líbero, is the association's vice president.

Despite its denounced bias—identified as neoconservative—the newspaper has received awards for some of its content, such as the investigation by journalist Emily Avendaño into links between Brazilian conglomerate Odebrecht and Venezuelan president Nicolás Maduro, which was recognized by the Inter American Press Association in 2018.

In October 2017, El Líbero launched Ediciones El Líbero Publishing House and has published various books on politics and public affairs. Its list of authors included former Chilean minister of culture Mauricio Rojas.

== Origins ==
According to Sepúlveda, the publication's name, El Líbero, is inspired by the Italian word Libero, which means "free". Additionally, in an interview with Canal 13, Sepúlveda mentioned the Roman god of freedom, Liber, whose name refers to being able to move freely, one of the publication's goals.

== Ideology and criticism ==
In its beginnings, the periodical was popularly known as the "right-wing CIPER". Centre-left politician Álvaro Elizalde described the outlet as a "UDI pamphlet", in reference to the right-wing party Unión Demócrata Independiente. The far-left newspaper La Izquierda Diario has described El Líbero as reactionary. El Mostrador has linked the newspaper to former President Sebastián Piñera, noting that two of his former ministers, Gabriel Ruiz-Tagle and Cristián Larroulet, are among the newspaper's owners. After Piñera came to power, members of his government, such as Mario Desbordes, criticized the influence Larroulet had on El Líbero in attempting to exert pressure on the president to implement libertarian policies.

== Notable columnists ==
- José Miguel Insulza
- Axel Kaiser
- Luis Larraín
- Carlos Alberto Montaner
- José Rodríguez Elizondo
- Alejandro San Francisco
- José Antonio Viera-Gallo

== See also ==
- Fundación para el Progreso

== Sources ==
- Navarro, Luis (2019). "La educación escolar en los tiempos de Piñera II". In Pamela Díaz-Romero Monreal; Alfredo Rodríguez Arranz; Augusto Varas Fernández (eds.). Chile en marcha, ¿atrás? El largo invierno de Piñera II. Barómetro de Política y Sociedad. Vol. 15. pp. 115–132. ISBN 978-956-208-107-8.
