= Olivier Ihl =

French political scientist, b. 1965

Olivier Ihl (born 29 December 1965, in Sarreguemines) is a French professor of political science, director of the Grenoble Institute of Political Studies in Grenoble, France and member of the laboratory PACTE (acronym of Politiques publiques, ACtion politique, TErritoires).

He is the head of an international program of scientific cooperation between France and Chile.

== Approach ==
Olivier Ihl is with Yves Déloye one of the main representatives of the school of the historical sociology of politics, which consists in crossing the contributions of three disciplines (sociology, history, political science) to seize complex phenomena such vote, sciences of government, the Republic, etc.

=== Topics ===
The guiding thread of his research is the representation of politics; he notably studied the republican commemorations, the rites of commensalité (e.g. banquets), political protocol, street names, presidential travels, act of voting, democracy, populism, electoral frauds, relation between violence and politics, socio-history of rewards, distinctions and merit.

=== Material history ===
The apprehension of historic facts by people and by things which make them concretely rather than by the big ideas or the institutional narratives. For instance, Revolution is studied through the people who come down in the street to make the Revolution, or the events in polling stations during the first elections (fights, quarrels, noise, debates, and so on).

== Publications ==
=== Books ===
- L'acte de vote (with Yves Déloye), Paris, Presses de Sciences Po, 2008.
- Le mérite et la République. Essai sur la société des émules, Paris, Gallimard, 2007.

A wide range of pictures related to this book is published in the author's website.

- Les "sciences" de l’action publique (ed.), Grenoble, PUG, 2006.
- Les sciences de gouvernement (co-ed. Martine Kaluszynski et Gilles Pollet), Paris, Economica, coll. Études Politiques, 2003.
- La tentation populiste au cœur de l'Europe, (co-ed. Janine Chêne, Eric Vial, Ghislain Waterlot), Paris, La Découverte, 2003.
- Un cérémonial politique : les voyages officiels des chefs d'état, Paris, L'Harmattan, (co-ed. Jean-William. Dereymez, Gérard Sabatier, dir.), 1998.
- Le vote, Paris, Clefs-Montchrestien, 2000 (1996).
- Le protocole ou la mise en forme de l'ordre politique, Paris, L'Harmattan, 1996 (co-ed. Yves Déloye, Claudine Haroche), 1996.
- La fête républicaine, Paris, Gallimard, Bibliothèque des Histoires, 1996.

=== Selection of papers ===
- "Hiérarchiser des égaux. Les distinctions honorifiques sous la Révolution française", Revue française d'histoire des idées politiques, 23, 2006, pp. 35–54.
- "Récompenser la vertu. Sur la charité "scientifique" de l’Académie des Sciences morales et politiques", Mélanges de l'École française de Rome, t. 117, 2005, 2, pp. 871–892.
- "Pour une histoire matérielle de la démocratie", (avec Y. Déloye), Critique, juin-juillet 2005, 697-698, pp. 484–495.
- "Gouverner par les honneurs. Distinctions honorifiques et économie politique dans l'Europe du début du XIXe siècle", Genèses, 55, 2004, pp. 4–26.
- "Conspirations et science du pouvoir chez François Guizot", Revue Française d'Histoire des Idées Politiques, 19, 2004, 125-150.
- "Le pouvoir de la règle. Sur la codification de la représentation proportionnelle dans la France des XIXe et XXe siècles", Ateliers, special issue "Logiques de l'extériorité", 27, 2004, pp. 47–80.
- "Pour une sociologie historique des sciences de gouvernement", (avec M. Kaluszynski), Revue Française d'Administration Publique, 102, April–June 2002, pp. 229–243.
- "Une ingénierie politique. Augustin Cauchy et les élections du 23 avril 1848", Genèses, 49, December 2002, pp. 5–25.
- "Religion civile : la carrière comparée d'un concept France États-unis", Revue Internationale de Politique Comparée, 3, vol 7, winter 2000, pp. 595–627.
- "Une déférence d'État. La République des titres et des honneurs", Communications, 69, January 2000, pp. 115–137.
- "Le XIXe siècle au miroir de la sociologie historique" (avec Yves Déloye), Revue d'histoire du XIXe siècle, n°13, 2, 1996, pp. 47–57 .
- "Des voix pas comme les autres. Votes blancs et votes nuls aux élections législatives de 1881" (with Yves Déloye), Revue Française de Science Politique, vol. 41, 2, avril 1991, pp. 141–170.

=== Publications in English ===
- "The Market of Honors : On the Bicentenary of the Legion of Honor", French Politics, Culture & Society, Vol. 24 · No. 1, Spring 2006, pp. 8–24.
- "Emulation through Decoration : A Science of Government ?", in Sudhir Hazareesingh (dir.), The Jacobin of Legacy in Modern France, Oxford, Oxford University Press, 2002, pp. 158–182

Olivier Ihl regularly works with the Institute of French Studies at New York University.

=== Publications in Italian ===
- "Democrazia, repubblica e radicalismo: modelli (anglosassone e francese) e dibattiti nell' Ottocento", in La democrazia radicale nell' Ottocento europeo. Forme della politica, modelli culturali, riforme sociali, Feltrinelli Editore (Ed.) (2006) 3-32.
- "Religione civile : il concetto in prospettiva comparata", in Rituali civili. Storie nazionali e memorie pubbliche nell’Europa contemporanea, Maurizio Ridolfi (ed.), Rome, Gangemi Editore, 2006, pp. 31–46.
- "Une territorialità repubblicana. I nomi delle vie nella Francia del XIX e XX secolo", Memoria e Ricerca. Rivista di storia contemporanea, 9, aprile 2002, pp. 17–34.

=== Publications in Spanish ===
- "Las conspiraciones ante el espejo de una "ciencia del poder". O las lecciones liberales del ministro François Guizot", in Teorias de la Conspiracion, Juan Cristobal Cruz Revueltas et Jesus Rodriguez Zepeda, Mexico, Publicaciones Cruz O.S.A., 2006, pp. 63–104.
- El voto, Lom Editions, Santiago (Chile), 2004 (Translated by Inès Picazo).
