= Pauline Kantor =

Chilean journalist and politician

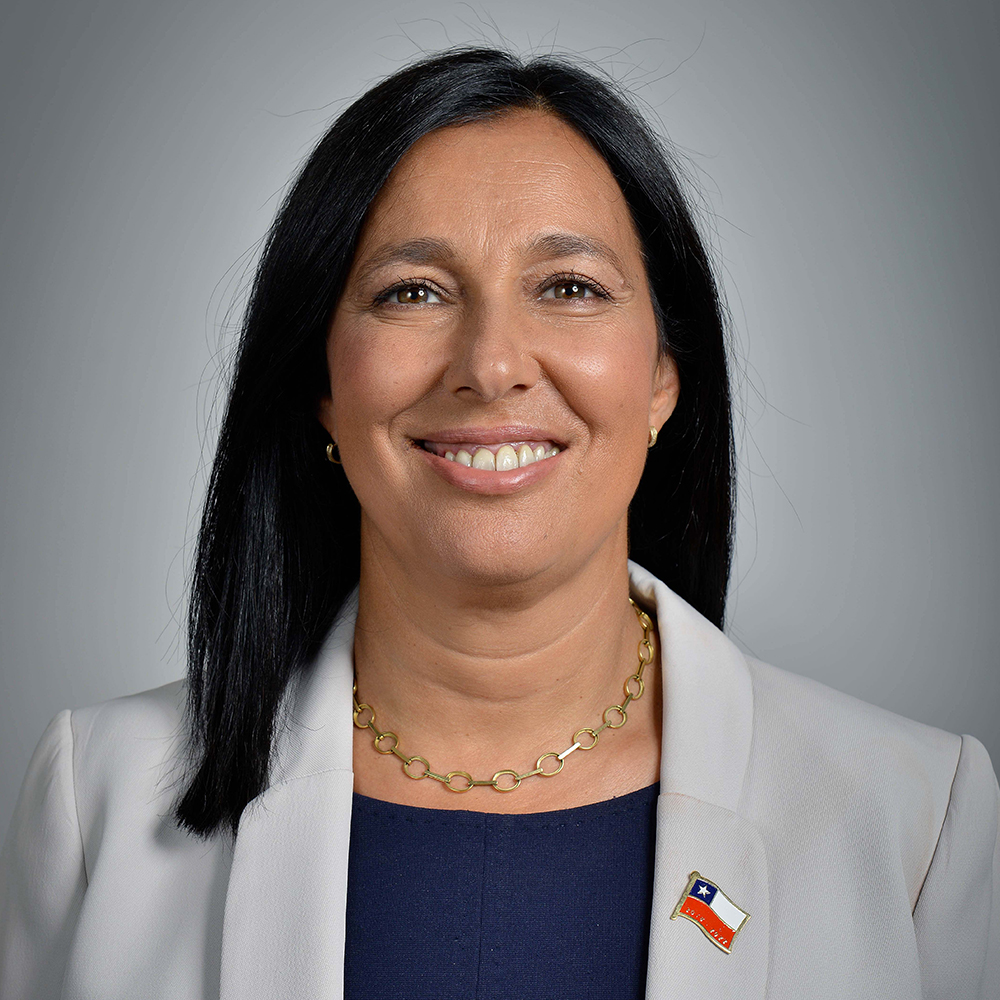
- Official portrait (2018)

Minister of Sports
- In office 11 March 2018 – 28 October 2019
- President: Sebastián Piñera
- Preceded by: Pablo Squella
- Succeeded by: Cecilia Pérez

Personal details
- Born: 10 April 1964 (age 62) Santiago, Chile
- Party: Evópoli
- Spouse: Agustín Salas
- Children: Five (Benjamín Salas Kantor, otros)
- Education: Pontifical Catholic University of Chile (BA); Columbia University (MA)
- Occupation: Politician
- Profession: Journalist

María Paulina Milada Kantor Pupkin (born 10 April 1964) is a Chilean politician and journalist, militant from Political Evolution (Evópoli/EVOP).

== Sports career ==
Kantor was an alpine skier who became national champion in 1976 and 1978 and was a member of the Chile national team from 1979 to 1982.

== Professional career ==
Kantor worked as a journalist for Canal 13, as well as for the magazines Caras and El Sábado. She has also served as managing partner at several strategic communications consulting firms, including Factor C, KO2, and Grupo Etcheberry.

In August 2020, she became the first woman to chair the board of Dimacofi, a Chilean company specializing in document printing services.

== Political career ==
During the first administration of Sebastián Piñera, Kantor served as executive secretary of the Chilean government's Bicentennial Commission in 2010. From 2011 to 2014, she led the public health initiative Elige Vivir Sano ("Choose to Live Healthy").

In January 2018, she was appointed Minister of Sports in Piñera’s second administration, officially taking office on 11 March 2018. She left the position on 28 October 2019 as part of a cabinet reshuffle amid the mass protests against the government.

In November 2020, Kantor announced her candidacy for the Constitutional Convention as part of the Evópoli list, representing District 11, which includes the municipalities of Vitacura, Las Condes, Lo Barnechea, La Reina, and Peñalolén. She was not elected.

== Personal life ==
She is of Jewish descent.
