= Hugo Gutiérrez (footballer) =

Argentine footballer

Personal information
- Full name: Hugo Ezequiel Gutiérrez
- Date of birth: 16 December 1991 (age 34)
- Place of birth: Rosario, Argentina
- Height: 1.73 m (5 ft 8 in)
- Position: Forward

Youth career
- Botafogo de Rosario
- Unión de Álvarez

Senior career*
Years	Team	Apps	(Gls)
2010–2011	Deportes Concepción	1	(0)
2011	Coquimbo Unido	0	(0)
2012	Huracán de Bustinza		
2012–2013	Guaraní Antonio Franco		
2013	Almafuerte		
2014	PSM Fútbol		
2014–2015	Mitre de Salta		
- * Club domestic league appearances and goals

Hugo Ezequiel Gutiérrez (born 16 December 1991) is an Argentine former footballer.

== Teams ==
- (Chile) Deportes Concepción 2010–2011
- (Chile) Coquimbo Unido 2011
- (Argentina) Huracán de Bustinza 2012
- (Argentina) Guaraní Antonio Franco 2012–2013
- (Argentina) Almafuerte 2013
- (Argentina) PSM Fútbol 2014
- (Argentina) Mitre de Salta 2014–2015

== See also ==
- Football in Argentina
- List of football clubs in Argentina
