= Katherine Hite =

American author and academic

- Born: Katherine Juliet Roberts Hite
- Occupations: Author academic
- Years active: 1997–

Katherine Juliet Roberts Hite is a U.S. author and academic whose fields of expertise are social movements, Latin American politics, and the politics of coming to terms with the past. She received her B.A. from Duke University and her Masters in International Affairs and PhD in political science from Columbia University with a thesis on "The formation and transformation of political identity: leaders of the Chilean left, 1968–1990". Hite joined the Vassar faculty in 1997 and is currently a professor of political science and Frederick Ferris Thompson Chair of political science at Vassar College.

== Work ==
She is the author of:

- When the romance ended: leaders of the Chilean left, 1968–1998 New York: Columbia University Press, 2000. According to WorldCat, the book is held in 1461 libraries
- (with Paola Cesarini.) Authoritarian Legacies and Democracy in Latin America and Southern Europe. Notre Dame, Ind: University of Notre Dame Press, 2004
- Politics and the art of commemoration: memorials to struggle in Latin America and Spain London; New York: Routledge, 2012.
  - Translated into Spanish by Jesús Cuéllar as Política y arte de la conmemoración: memoriales en América Latina y España
