= Hugo Gutiérrez Gálvez =

Chilean politician (born 1961)

Hugo Gutiérrez
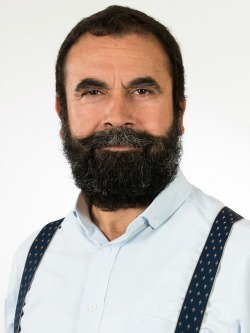

Member of the Constitutional Convention
- In office 4 July 2021 – 4 July 2022
- Constituency: 13th District

Member of the Chamber of Deputies
- In office 11 March 2010 – 11 January 2021
- Preceded by: Fulvio Rossi
- Succeeded by: Rubén Moraga
- Constituency: 2nd District

Councilman of Estación Central
- In office 6 December 2004 – 6 December 2008

Personal details
- Born: 25 March 1973 (age 53) Iquique, Chile
- Party: Communist Party
- Spouse: Carmen Barrera
- Children: Six
- Parent(s): Hugo Gutiérrez Lara; Margarita Gálvez
- Education: University of Concepción (LL.B)
- Occupation: Politician
- Profession: Lawyer

Hugo Humberto Gutiérrez Gálvez (born 5 October 1961) is a Chilean lawyer and politician.

A member of the Communist Party of Chile, he served as a member of the Constitutional Convention. His position was replaced by Rubén Moraga, former governor of Tamarugal Province.

He previously served three consecutive terms as a deputy for the 2nd District of the Tarapacá Region (2010–2021) and was a municipal councillor of Estación Central from 2004 to 2008.

== Early life and family ==
Gutiérrez was born in Iquique on 5 October 1961. He is the son of Hugo Gutiérrez Lara and Margarita Luisa Gálvez Díaz; his stepfather was Jorge Valenzuela. He is the father of six children.

Gutiérrez completed his primary education at Escuela Básica Nº 3 of Iquique and his secondary education at Liceo de Hombres de Iquique, graduating in 1979.

He performed compulsory military service between 1980 and 1981 in the Carampangue Infantry Regiment Nº 2, stationed in Baquedano, Iquique, where he attained the rank of second sergeant.

== Professional career ==
He later studied law at the University of Concepción, where he was awarded the Enrique Molina Garmendia scholarship. Due to his participation in opposition student movements during the military dictatorship, his scholarship was suspended and he was expelled from the university in 1985. He successfully appealed this decision before the Court of Appeals of Concepción and was reinstated.

His graduation thesis on criminal procedure received a score of 94 out of 100, and his bar examination was passed with distinction. He completed his professional internship at the Santiago Penitentiary in 1988, obtaining an “Outstanding” evaluation, and was admitted to the bar on 8 January 1990. He later undertook postgraduate studies in tax law at the University of Santiago, Chile.

Gutiérrez has taught at the Arturo Prat University (Iquique campus) and as a lecturer in civil law at the ARCIS University in Santiago. In parallel, he practiced law at the firm Fabiola Letelier Asociados and in 2007 co-founded the human rights law firm Gutiérrez y Monsalve Asociados with lawyer Fernando Monsalve.

== Political career ==
Gutiérrez began his political activity in 1983 as a university student. He initially joined the Almeydista Youth of the Socialist Party of Chile but resigned in 1986 and later became a member of the Communist Party of Chile.

In 1988, he moved to Santiago and joined the Corporation for the Promotion and Defense of the Rights of the People (CODEPU), where he worked until 2002 as a prosecuting lawyer in numerous human rights cases related to violations committed during the military dictatorship. In this role, he represented relatives of disappeared detainees and participated as a plaintiff in cases such as the Caravan of Death and the impeachment proceedings against former dictator Augusto Pinochet.

He also worked at the Human Rights Legal Aid Office of the Metropolitan Region, successor to the criminal cases previously handled by the Vicariate of Solidarity.

In the 2004 municipal elections, Gutiérrez was elected councillor for the commune of Estación Central, obtaining 7,772 votes (12.94%). After completing his term, he ran for mayor of Estación Central, finishing in second place with 31.44% of the vote and was not elected.

He was elected as a deputy for the 2nd District of the Tarapacá Region in the parliamentary elections of 2009, 2013, and 2017, representing the Communist Party of Chile. In the 2017 election, he obtained 14,332 votes (15.85%).

In the elections held on 15–16 May 2021, Gutiérrez was elected as a member of the Constitutional Convention for the 2nd District of the Tarapacá Region, representing the Communist Party of Chile. He assumed office on 4 July 2021.

In the parliamentary elections of 16 November 2025, he ran as a candidate for the Senate representing the Tarapacá Region under the Unidad por Chile pact, but was not elected, obtaining 18,922 votes (10.32%).
