= Tomás Mosciatti =

Chilean radio host and political commentator

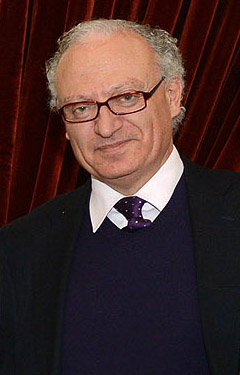
Tomás Mosciatti

Tomás Mosciatti is a Chilean radio host and political commentator of Radio Bío Bío.

He was the firstborn of the matrimony of Nibaldo Mosciatti Moena, a journalism businessman from Concepción and the lawyer Olga Olivieri Aste.

In July 2020 Mosciatti was sued by Eugenio González for libel.
