= Fundación para el Progreso =

Chilean libertarian think tank

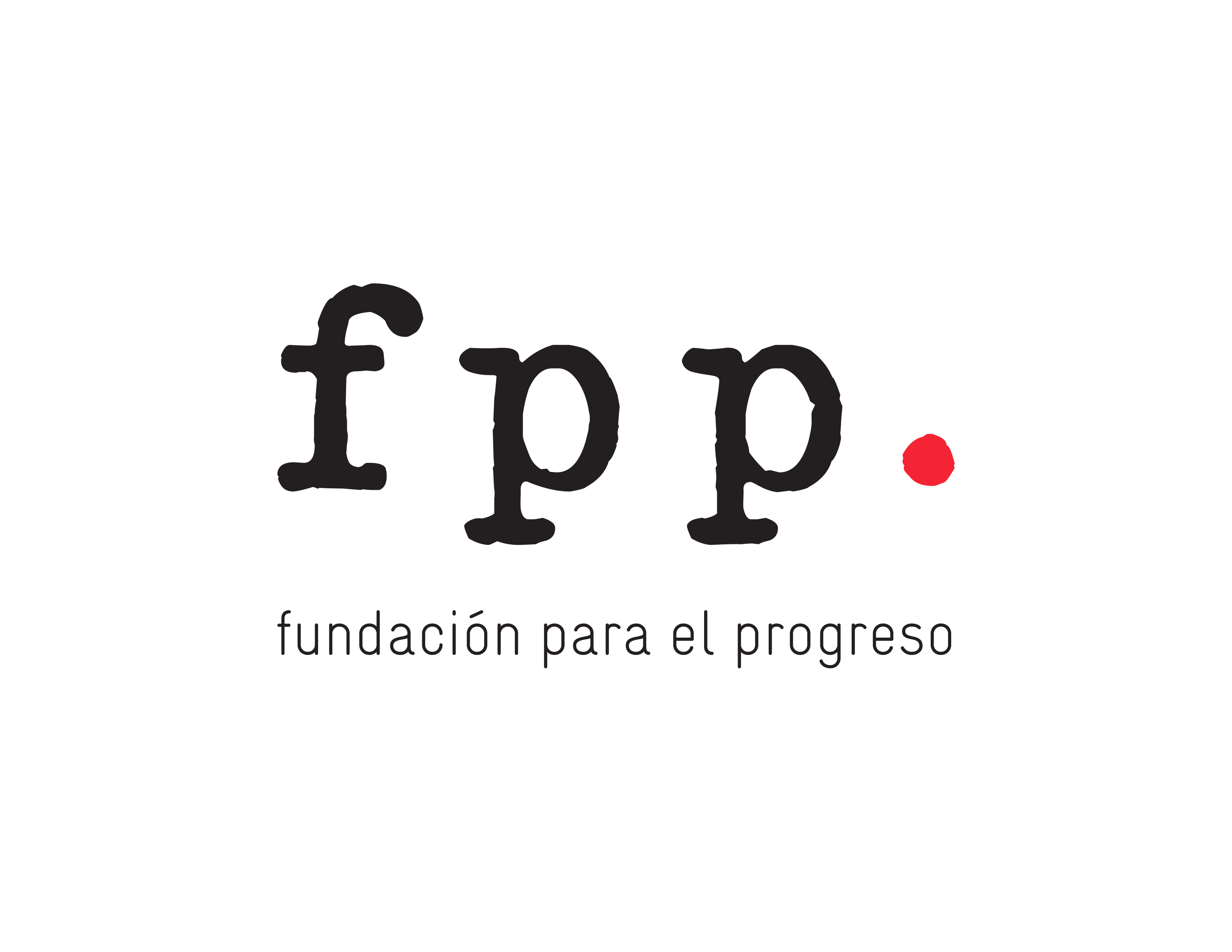
- Abbreviation: FPP
- Formation: 2012
- Type: Advocacy think tank
- Headquarters: Providencia, Chile
- CEO: Axel Kaiser
- Website: fppchile.org

The Fundación para el Progreso ("Foundation for Progress", FPP) is a Chilean think tank founded in 2012. It focuses on promoting ideas related to classical liberalism. Axel Kaiser serves as the chairman of its board of directors

FPP has offices in Santiago, Valparaíso, Concepción, and Valdivia.

According to some pundits, the think tank increased its influence after the re-election of Sebastián Piñera to the Chilean presidency in 2018. The FPP defended the continuity of the government in the midst of the 2019−2021 social crisis in the country.

== Bibliography ==
- Alenda, Stéphanie (2020). Anatomy of the Chilean right-wing: State, market and values in times of changes. Santiago, Chile: Fondo de Cultura Económica.
- Medvetz, Thomas (2012). Think Tanks in America: Power, Politics, and the New Form of Intellectual Engagement. Chicago: University of Chicago Press.
- McGann, James; Weaver, R. Kent (2000). Think Tanks and Civil Societies: Catalyst for Ideas and Action. Transaction Publishers.
- Rodríguez, Gina Paola (2020). "Right-wing think tanks and gender discourses in Chile". Revista de Temas Sociológicos. 27: 91–125. doi:10.29344/07196458.27.2500. S2CID 234461953.
- Stone, Diane (2010). "Think Tank Transnationalisation and Non-profit Analysis, Advice and Advocacy". Global Society. 2 (14): 153−172. doi:10.1080/13600820050008421. S2CID 145492376.
