= Axel Kaiser =

Chilean lawyer, philosopher and writer (born 1981)

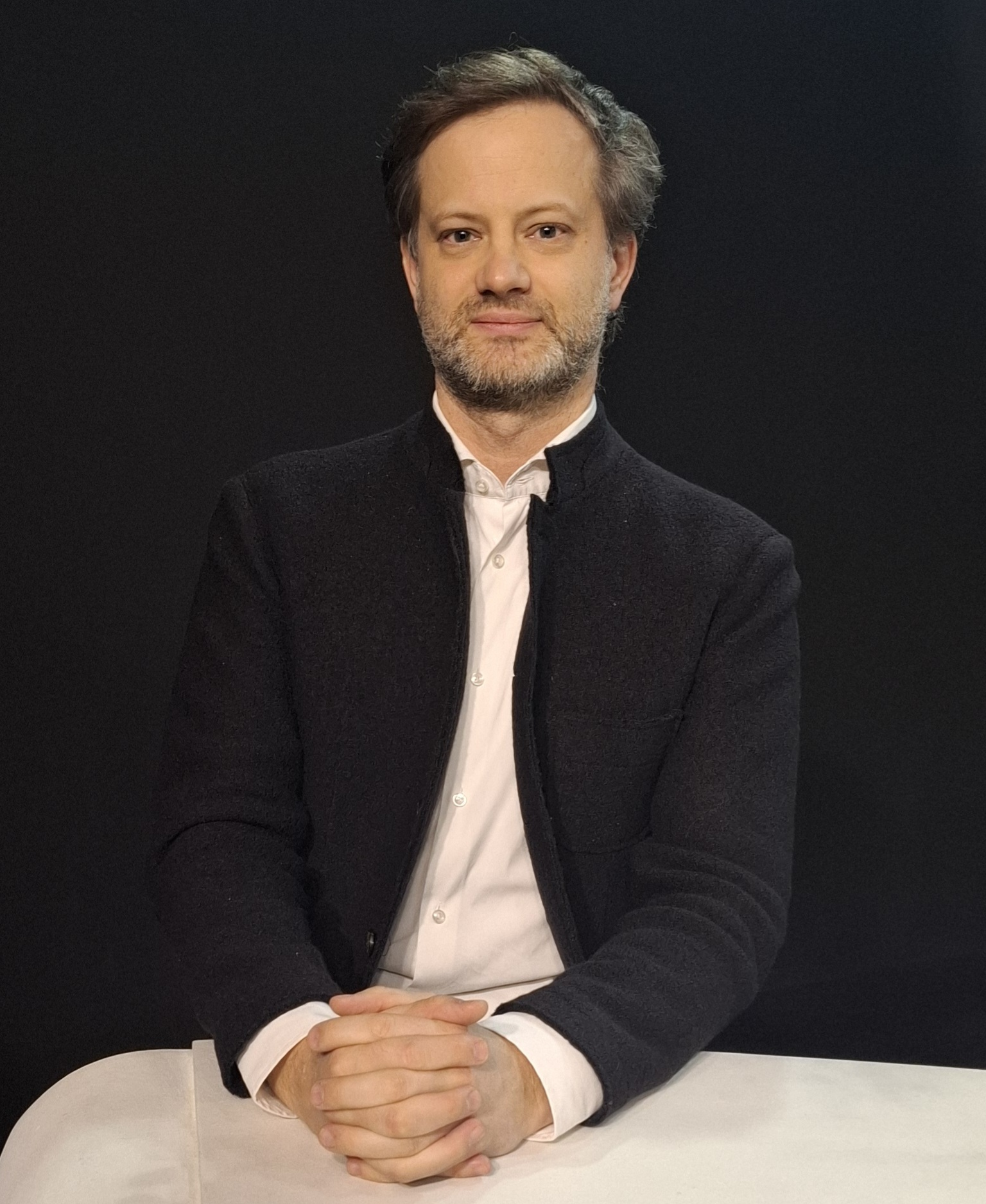
- Born: 4 July 1981 (age 45); Santiago, Chile
- Occupation: Author

Academic background
- Education: Universidad Diego Portales (LL.B.); University of Heidelberg (LL.M. in Investments, Trade and Arbitration); University of Heidelberg (M.A. in American studies); University of Heidelberg (Ph.D. in American studies)
- Thesis: The American Philosophical Foundations of the Chilean Free Market Revolution. (2014)
- Doctoral advisor: Katja Patzel-Mattern, Martin Thunert y Detlef Junker

Academic work
- Discipline: Political sciences Philosophy
- School or tradition: Austrian School
- Institutions: Universidad del Desarrollo; University of the Andes; Adolfo Ibáñez University; Stanford University

Axel Kaiser (born 4 July 1981) is a Chilean writer, lawyer and political scientist known for his work on free-market economics. Kaiser is a member of the Mont Pelerin Society and has published articles in Forbes and other publications. He is also the author of several books, including The Tyranny of Equality and The Populist Deception.

== Biography ==
Axel Kaiser was born to Hans Christian Kaiser Wagner and Rosmarie Barents Haensgen, a German-Chilean family.

His paternal grandparents were Rosemarie Wagner Schilling, a fourth-generation German-Chilean, and her husband, the German immigrant Friedrich Ernst Kaiser Richter, who defined politically as a Social Democrat, arrived in Chile as a refugee from Württemberg in 1936, escaping National Socialist Germany after Adolf Hitler's rise to power and before World War II, having foreseen its outbreak.

He married his wife in April 1939 and settled in Villarrica in Southern Chile, where he was eventually elected as the 9th mayor of the city, serving between May 1956 and October 1957. His father was active in the National Party, serving as a youth leader.

He is the brother of Vanessa Kaiser, former scholar at the Universidad Autónoma de Chile and director of the libertarian think tank Centro de Estudios Libertarios and former councilor of Las Condes, he is also brother of Johannes Kaiser, a right-wing politician, former member of the Chamber of Deputies of Chile, founder of the National Libertarian Party bz Leif Kaiser, chairman of the Chilean National Rifle Association, along with three other less prominent siblings.

He spent his childhood and adolescence in Villarrica with his brothers. While living in the Chilean capital, he earned a Bachelor of Laws at Universidad Diego Portales. He qualified as a lawyer on 7 August 2007.

In 2009, Kaiser won a Fulbright Program scholarship and travelled to Germany to pursue two master's degrees (Master of Arts in International Law, mention Investments, Trade and Arbitration and another in American Studies) and a PhD in American Studies in Heidelberg University, with the thesis The American Philosophical Foundations of the Chilean Free Market Revolution.

Back in Chile, he was a full professor at Universidad del Desarrollo and the Universidad de los Andes, where he taught a course on Latin American Politics. A 2017 poll by La Segunda ranked him among the most admired public intellectuals in Chile.

Actress Susana Hidalgo alleged Kaiser used a copyright of hers without gaining permission by using one of her images of the 2019–2020 Chilean protests in the promotional posters of his talks in Mexico in February 2020.

== Books ==
- El Chile que Viene (2007)
- La Fatal Ignorancia (2009)
- La Miseria del Intervencionismo (2012)
- La Tiranía de la Igualdad (2015)
- El Engaño Populista (2016), co-author with Gloria Álvarez
- El Papa y el Capitalismo (2018)
- La Neoinquisición (2020)
- The Street Economist: Fifteen economic lessons every citizen should know (El Economista Callejero) (2021)
- El odio a los ricos (2023), co-author with Rainer Zitelmann
- Parásitos mentales: Siete ideas progresistas que infectan nuestro pensamiento y sociedad (2024), ISBN 978-956-9948-60-2

=== Novels ===
- El libro de Asgalard (Ediciones Minotauro, 2023), ISBN 978-956-9957-26-0

== See also ==
- Fundación para el Progreso
- El Líbero
