= Pía Adriasola =

First Lady of Chile since 2026

María Pía Adriasola
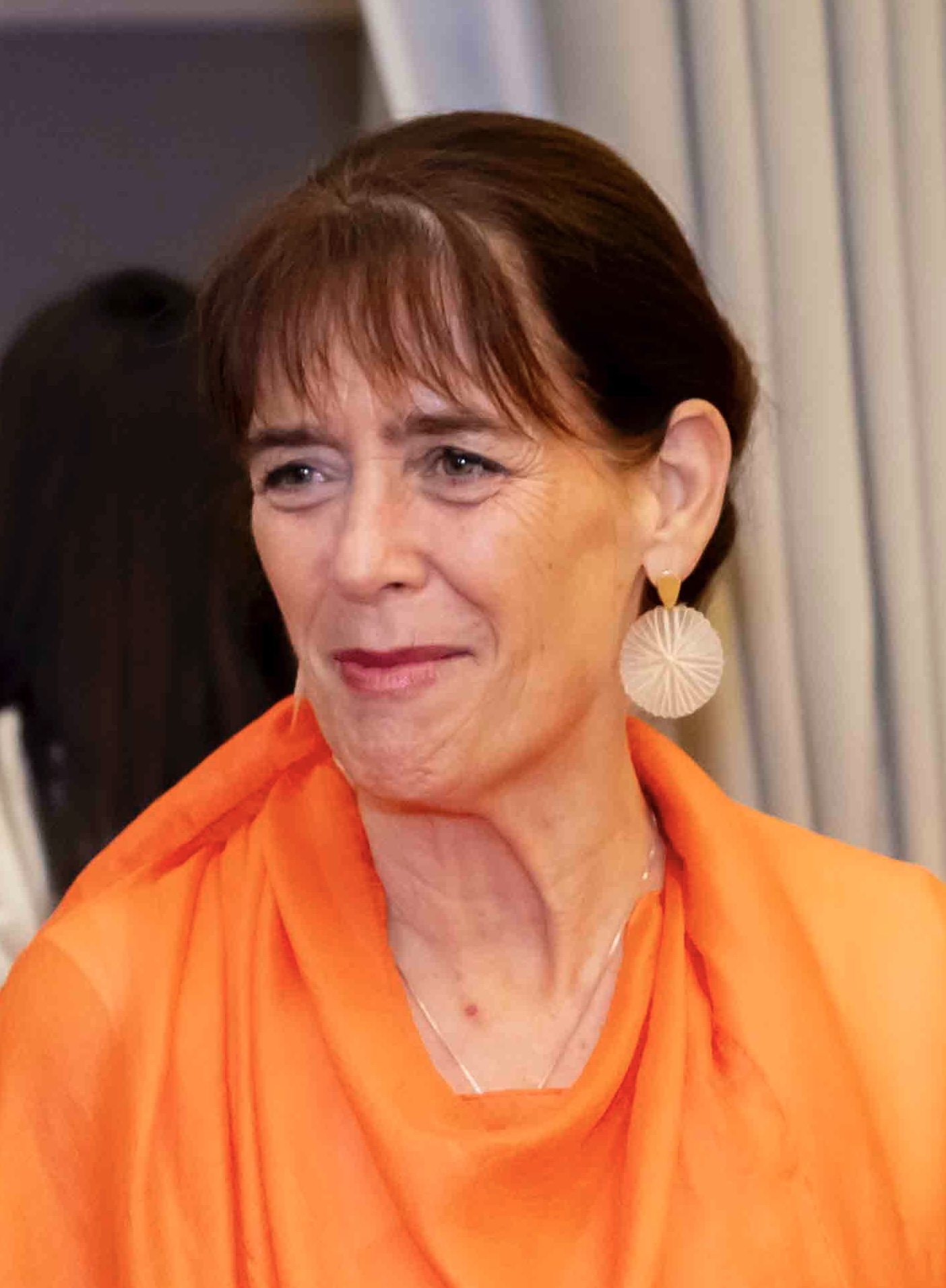
- Adriasola in 2026

First Lady of Chile
- Current
- Assumed role 11 March 2026
- President: José Antonio Kast
- Preceded by: Irina Karamanos (2022)

Personal details
- Born: María Pía Adriasola Barroilhet; 9 March 1966 (age 60) Santiago, Chile
- Spouse: José Antonio Kast (m. 1990)
- Children: 9, including José Antonio Kast Adriasola
- Relatives: Michael Kast (father-in-law); Miguel Kast (brother-in-law); Bárbara Kast (sister-in-law); Pablo, Felipe and Tomás Kast (nephews)
- Education: Pontifical Catholic University of Chile
- Occupation: Lawyer, activist

María Pía Adriasola Barroilhet (born 9 March 1966) is a Chilean lawyer and activist. She is the First Lady of Chile, as the wife of José Antonio Kast, president of Chile.

== Biography ==
=== Early life and education ===
Adriasola was born in Santiago, Chile. She is one of eight children of Fernando Adriasola and Teresita Barroilhet, of Basque-French origin. She spent her childhood on a rural property in the commune of Puente Alto, in an area close to what is now the urban development of Bajos de Mena.

Adriasola completed her primary education at Colegio Los Andes, a private girls' school, and her final two years of secondary education at Colegio de los Sagrados Corazones de Providencia, a Catholic girls' school. She later studied law at the Pontifical Catholic University of Chile and earned her law degree in 1992.

She has been involved since her youth in the Schoenstatt Apostolic Movement.

=== Marriage and children ===
During the first year of her career, Adriasola met José Antonio Kast. Their relationship began two years later. They married in December 1990 in a Catholic ceremony. Kast left politics aside and they moved to live in Paine.

Adriasola and Kast have 9 children. Adriasola stopped practicing as a lawyer after her first daughter was born.

=== First Lady of Chile ===
After Kast won the second round of the 2025 Presidential elections in Chile on December, she became the future First Lady of Chile, role that was officially annulled by Gabriel Boric and the Former First Lady Irina Karamanos.

One of her first activities post elections, was meeting with former First Ladies Cecilia Morel, Luisa Duran and Marta Larraechea. She also visited several social instances as Fundación Arcoíris Down and Fundación Obra Don Guanella, according to information provided on her official Instagram account.

Adriasola and her husband also extended an invitation to visit La Moneda to a girl with Down syndrome that had been harassed and threatened.

== Political activism and views ==
Adriasola founded the Cuide Chile ("Take Care of Chile") Foundation, a non-governmental organization with a socially conservative orientation linked to the Republican Party of Chile. She has described herself as a "feminist" aligned with the principles of second-wave feminism, while expressing criticism of what she considers more radical strands of third-wave feminism.

Her moral views in favor of monogamy and opposition to premarital sex became public during a 2020 session of the Education Committee of the Chamber of Deputies, where she participated as an adviser to the Republican Party in discussions on comprehensive sex education legislation. On that occasion, Adriasola argued that sexual abstinence is the most effective method for preventing unintended pregnancy and sexually transmitted infections, stating that "the only truly safe sex is abstinence."

Adriasola has expressed anti-abortion views, identifying herself as pro-life and asserting that a child is conceived regardless of the stage of gestation.

Honorary titles
Preceded by Irina Karamanos	First Lady of Chile; 2026–present	Current holder
