= José Antonio Kast Adriasola =

Chilean politician (born 1993)

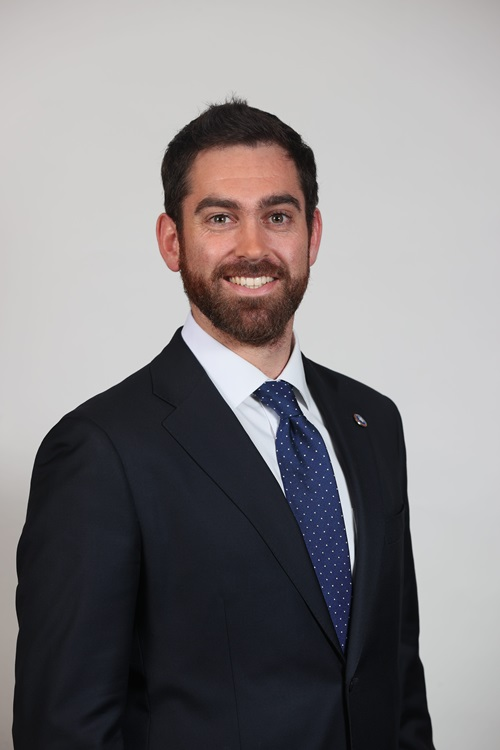
- Official portrait, 2026

Member of the Chamber of Deputies
- Incumbent
- Assumed office 11 March 2026
- Preceded by: Johannes Kaiser
- Constituency: District 10

Personal details
- Born: 21 April 1993 (age 33) Paine, Chile
- Party: Republican
- Parents: José Antonio Kast (father); Pía Adriasola (mother)
- Relatives: Michael Kast (grandfather); Miguel Kast (uncle); Pablo, Felipe and Tomás Kast (cousins)
- Education: Pontifical Catholic University of Chile; University of the Andes; University of Chicago
- Occupation: Politician
- Profession: Lawyer

José Antonio Kast Adriasola (born 21 April 1993) is a Chilean politician serving as a member of the Chamber of Deputies since 2026, representing District 10 of the Santiago Metropolitan Region. He is the son of incumbent president, José Antonio Kast.

== Biography ==
He is the second of nine children of the marriage between Chilean politician José Antonio Kast Rist and Pía Adriasola, a lawyer. His father comes from a family of German origin and is Catholic—his parents were Bavarian immigrants—and has publicly declared his faith and traditional family values. The Kast–Adriasola family is close to the Schönstatt Apostolic Movement.

Kast Adriasola has followed an independent political trajectory. He studied law at the Pontifical Catholic University of Chile, where he served as a teaching assistant in procedural law. He later completed a master's degree in philosophy at the University of the Andes and subsequently pursued studies in public policy at the University of Chicago in the United States.

He has participated in political campaigns, led the NGO Influyamos, and assumed strategic roles within the Republican Party, maintaining socially conservative positions on issues such as abortion, cannabis use, and sex education.

In 2020, Kast Adriasola was announced as a candidate for mayor of San Bernardo, resigning from his position at a law firm to dedicate himself to the campaign. However, he ultimately withdrew his candidacy in January 2021, arguing that with another right-wing candidate competing, it would not be possible to consolidate a victory.

He later assumed a strategic role within the Republican Party. In 2024, he served as coordinator of the party's municipal campaigns in the Metropolitan Region. In 2025, in his first formal electoral bid, he ran as a candidate for the Chamber of Deputies of Chile for District 10, receiving public support from his father, José Antonio Kast.
