= Thalkirchdorf =

Town in Bavaria, Germany

Coordinates: 47°33′11″N 10°05′20″E

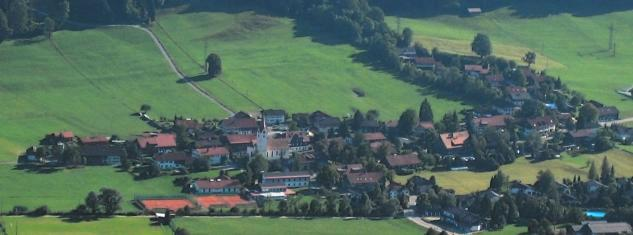
Kirchdorf in Thalkirchdorf

Thalkirchdorf is part of the municipality of Oberstaufen in Oberallgäu in the German state of Bavaria. From the AD 14th century on, the Konstanz valley was an important route for the transport of salt, an important good at the time.

== Notable people ==
- Michael Kast (1924–2014), German-Chilean businessman and father of 38th President of Chile José Antonio Kast
