= José Antonio Kast =

President of Chile since 2026

- Official portrait, 2026

39th President of Chile
- Incumbent
- Assumed office 11 March 2026
- Preceded by: Gabriel Boric

Member of the Chamber of Deputies
- In office 11 March 2002 – 11 March 2018
- Preceded by: Pablo Longueira
- Succeeded by: Constituency abolished
- Constituency: District 30 (2002–2014); District 24 (2014–2018)

Member of the Buin City Council
- In office 6 December 1996 – 6 December 2000

Personal details
- Born: José Antonio Kast Rist; 18 January 1966 (age 60) Santiago, Chile
- Party: Independent (2016–2019, since 2026)
- Other political affiliations: UDI (1996–2016); Republican (2019–2026)
- Spouse: Pía Adriasola (m. 1990)
- Children: Nine, including José Antonio Kast Adriasola
- Parent: Michael Kast (father)
- Relatives: Miguel Kast (brother); Pablo, Felipe and Tomás Kast (nephews)
- Education: Pontifical Catholic University of Chile (Lic.)
- Occupation: Politician, lawyer
- Website: Presidential press website (in Spanish)

José Antonio Kast Rist (Latin American Spanish: [xoˈse anˈtonjo ˈkast]; born 18 January 1966) is a Chilean lawyer and politician who has served as the 39th president of Chile since 2026. Kast previously served as a member of the Chamber of Deputies from 2002 to 2018, representing districts in the Santiago Metropolitan Region. (Note: From 2002 to 2014, Kast represented District 30, composed by the communes of Buin, Calera de Tango, Paine and San Bernardo. From 2014 to 2018, Kast represented District 24, composed by the communes of La Reina and Peñalolén.)

Born in Santiago to a German immigrant family, Kast graduated from the Pontificial Catholic University of Chile in 1990 with a degree in law. During his studies, he would become involved in youth pro-Pinochet conservative movements, supporting the "Yes" option in the 1988 presidential referendum, as well as forming part of Jaime Guzmán's Movimiento Gremialista. He joined the Independent Democratic Union (UDI) in 1996, from which he resigned in 2016. He became an independent for three years prior to his founding of the Republican Party (PRCh) in 2019.

He ran for president thrice: in 2017, as an independent close to the far-right, finishing fourth; in 2021, winning the first round but losing the runoff to Gabriel Boric; and in 2025, winning the runoff against Communist Party candidate Jeannette Jara, achieving the highest vote share since Chile's transition to democracy while carrying all electoral regions. He resigned from the Republican Party shortly before taking office on 11 March 2026.

Kast and his political movement are broadly considered part of the radical, populist right, with his government described as the most conservative since the Pinochet dictatorship. His administration, a self-described "emergency government", has focused on deregulation, cutting taxes, and a hard-line policy against illegal immigration.

== Early life and career ==
José Antonio Kast was born in Santiago into a German family. His parents, Michael Kast Schindele (1924–2014) and Olga Rist Hagspiel (1924–2015), were originally from Bavaria. His father served as a lieutenant in the German Army during World War II and was a member of the Nazi Party.

Kast's father emigrated to Chile in December 1950, settling in Buin. His mother and two siblings followed in 1951. In 1962, the family founded Cecinas Bavaria, a small sausage business that became the foundation of their wealth. The couple had ten children, three of whom predeceased their parents.

His brother Miguel Kast (1948–1983) was an economist who held posts under the military regime of Augusto Pinochet, including Minister of Labor and president of the Central Bank of Chile. José Antonio Kast is also the uncle of former member of the Chamber of Deputies Pablo Kast (born 1973), former senator Felipe Kast (born 1977), and member of the Chamber of Deputies Tomás Kast (born 1979).

External videos
- Kast in an electoral television spot
- Then-student José Antonio Kast in a pro-Pinochet television spot during the 1988 Chilean national plebiscite
- Link to video on YouTube

Kast studied law at the Pontifical Catholic University of Chile, where he became involved with the Movimiento Gremialista (Guildist Movement). He ran for president of the university's student federation (FEUC). As a student, he appeared in a campaign ad for the "Yes" vote in the 1988 Chilean national plebiscite, supporting an eight-year extension of Augusto Pinochet's rule.

In 1989, before being admitted to practice law, he co-founded Kast, Pinochet, De La Cuadra & Cía., a law firm, and later directed a family-owned real estate company in the 1990s. He taught civil law and commercial law at the Pontifical Catholic University of Chile's Institute of Economics.

Kast graduated with a Bachelor of Laws in 1990. His undergraduate thesis was titled "Freedom of association and assembly, freedom of the press, and suffrage in José Victorino Lastarria Santander." He was admitted to the practice of law by the Supreme Court of Chile in 1991.

== Parliamentarian career (2002–2018) ==
=== Beginnings ===
During his university years, he was elected to the Superior Council and ran as a candidate for the presidency of the Federation of Students of the Pontifical Catholic University of Chile (FEUC) representing the Guildist Movement. In that election, constitutional lawyer Patricio Zapata, a member of the Christian Democratic University movement, was elected. He also participated in the student council of the School of Law of the PUC, where he met Jaime Guzmán, who encouraged him to join the Independent Democratic Union (UDI).

In 1996, he ran in the municipal elections as a candidate for mayor of Buin, Chile, located south of the Santiago Metropolitan Region. After placing second, he assumed office as municipal councillor, a position he held between 1996 and 2000, during which time he also served as ceremonial mayor.

=== Deputy for 30th District: 2002–2014 ===
In 2001, he ran as a candidate for Deputy for the 30th District, comprising the communes of Buin, Calera de Tango, Paine, and San Bernardo in the Metropolitan Region, and was elected with the highest vote share for the 2002–2006 legislative term. During this period, he served on the Standing Committees on Education, Culture, Sports and Recreation, and Family, as well as on special committees related to disability benefits and youth affairs.

In 2005, he was re-elected for the same district for the 2006–2010 term. During this period, he participated in several standing and special committees, including Education, Family, Government Affairs, Youth, and an investigative committee on the creation of the criminalistics career.

In 2007, he was elected by his fellow UDI deputies as head of the party's parliamentary caucus in the Chamber of Deputies and was unanimously re-elected in 2008. That same year, he ran for the presidency of the UDI, obtaining 36% of the votes in the party's internal election.

In December 2009, he was re-elected Deputy for the 2010–2014 term. He served on the standing committees on Education, Sports and Recreation, Health, and Economy, Development and Tourism. In 2011, he was again elected head of the UDI parliamentary caucus and, on 30 March 2012, assumed the position of Secretary General of the UDI for a two-year term.

=== Deputy for 24th District: 2014–2018 ===
After withdrawing his pre-candidacy for the Senate in Santiago East in the 2013 elections, he ran as a candidate for Deputy for 24th District, comprising the communes of La Reina and Peñalolén, and was elected for the 2014–2018 term, succeeding María Angélica Cristi.

In September 2015, he announced his intention to run in a presidential primary within the Chile Vamos coalition. On 31 May 2016, he resigned from the UDI in order to pursue an independent presidential candidacy.

In 2017, after gathering the required number of signatures, he registered his independent candidacy for the presidency of Chile. In the first round of the presidential election, he placed fourth with 7.93% of the vote. Following the first round, he endorsed Sebastián Piñera for the runoff election.

He completed his term as Deputy on 11 March 2018, at which point he held no elected public office.

== Presidential campaigns ==
=== 2017 presidential campaign ===
On 18 August 2017, Kast registered his independent candidacy with 43,461 signatures. His support came from right-wing, conservative, libertarian, nationalist, and retired military groups. He campaigned on a platform of "less taxes, less government, pro-life" and anti-illegal immigration measures.

His support for the former dictatorship was controversial, especially his proposal to pardon convicts over 80 with age-related illnesses, including those convicted of human rights violations. He received 523,213 votes (7.93%), finishing fourth, outperforming polls that showed only 2–3% support. In the runoff, he supported the eventual winner, Sebastián Piñera. He stated, "[In today's world,] Chileans need God," and proposed making religion teachers available in public schools.

=== 2021 presidential campaign ===
Second presidential campaign logo in 2021

In 2018, Kast announced his intention to run in the 2021 presidential election. This time he ran under his own Republican Party. He formed the Christian Social Front pact with the Christian Conservative Party. His proposals included pardoning elderly former Pinochet officials, banning abortion, merging the Ministry of Women, withdrawing from the United Nations Human Rights Council, and building more prisons.

In May 2019, Kast founded the think tank Republican Ideas, and in June, he established the Republican Party. He opposed the 2019 protests, calling them acts of violence by "terrorists". As protest approval waned, he gained support from Chileans weary of the unrest.

In the 2020 referendum on a new constitution, he campaigned for "Reject," which received 21.72% of the vote; the change was approved with 78.28%. In the 2021 Chilean Constitutional Convention election, his party formed a joint list, Vamos por Chile, with the center-right coalition Chile Vamos. The list won 20.6% of the vote. Kast's proposed candidate, Teresa Marinovic, won a high percentage of votes, helping several others enter the Convention via the D'Hondt method.

His slogan, "make Chile a great country," drew comparisons to Donald Trump's Make America Great Again, with supporters wearing MAGA apparel at his events. His proposal to dig a moat along the Chile–Bolivia border has been compared to U.S. President Donald Trump's support for a wall along the Mexico–United States border. He skipped the Chile Vamos primary, won by Sebastián Sichel. After the first debate, Kast surpassed Sichel as the leading right-wing candidate. He won the first round with nearly 28% of the vote, advancing to a runoff against Gabriel Boric. He then secured endorsements from most of Chile's right, including President Sebastián Piñera. Internationally, he signed the Madrid Charter, a document authored by Spain's far-right Vox party, alongside figures like Rafael López Aliaga, Javier Milei, and Eduardo Bolsonaro. In late November 2021, he met in Washington, D.C., with Senator Marco Rubio, the Chilean ambassador to the OAS, and American business executives.

On 18 December, former candidate Franco Parisi endorsed Kast after an internal party consultation.

In the 19 December runoff, Kast received 44.13% of the vote, losing to Boric's 55.87%. He conceded and promised "constructive collaboration." He was the first candidate since 1999 to lead the first round but lose the runoff.

=== 2025 presidential campaign ===
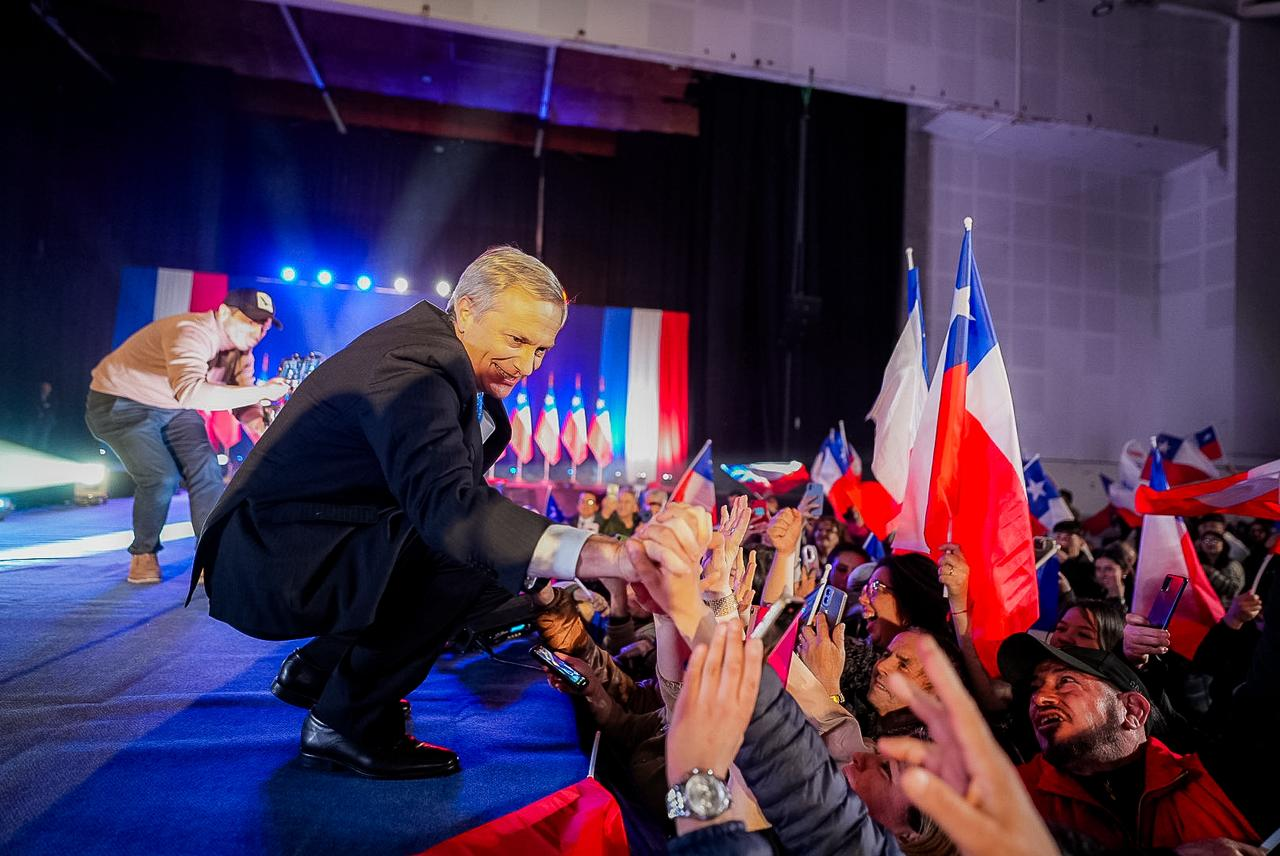
José Antonio Kast during the 2025 presidential campaign

On 29 November 2024, the Republican Party confirmed Kast as its candidate for the 2025 election, running under the Change for Chile coalition. In June 2025, he was endorsed by withdrawn candidate Francesca Muñoz and in August, he officially registered his campaign under the slogan La fuerza del cambio ("The Strength of Change"). His campaign focused on institutional renewal, public order, and economic recovery. Campaign pledges included building ditches on the northern border, mass deportations of illegal migrants, and constructing maximum-security prisons. Additionally, Kast made the Venezuelan refugee crisis a central element of his political campaign, and promised strict border enforcement and large-scale deportations.

Kast finished second in the first round on 16 November with nearly 24% of the vote, advancing to a runoff against Jeannette Jara. He received endorsements from Johannes Kaiser, Evelyn Matthei, and the Chile Grande y Unido coalition. Kast won the runoff on 14 December with over 58% of the vote, securing victories in all sixteen regions. His vote share was the second-highest since the transition to democracy, and his 7.2 million votes were the highest total in Chilean history.

== Presidency (2026–present) ==
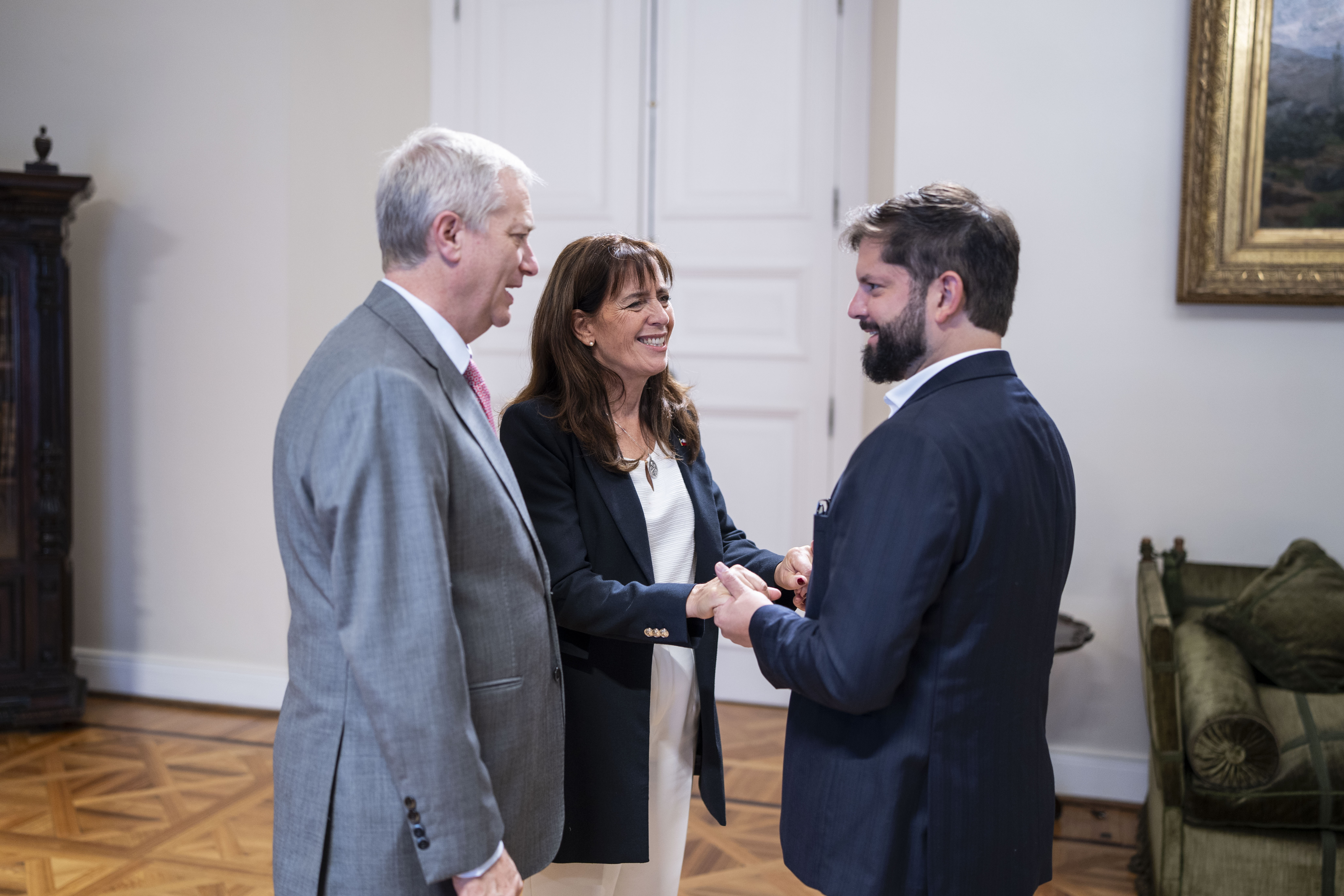
Kast and Pía Adriasola with Gabriel Boric following his election as president, 15 December 2025

=== Prior to Presidential Inaguration ===
Following his election, Kast confirmed his intention to reside at La Moneda Palace, the seat of the presidency in central Santiago, together with his wife Pía Adriasola. He is the first president to live in La Moneda since Carlos Ibáñez del Campo in the 1950s. As president-elect, Kast warned undocumented migrants that he would deport them if they did not leave before he took office. In response, Peruvian President José Jerí declared a state of emergency along the southern border with Chile to stem an influx of undocumented migrants, primarily Venezuelans, who were attempting to leave Chile following Kast's threats of mass expulsion.

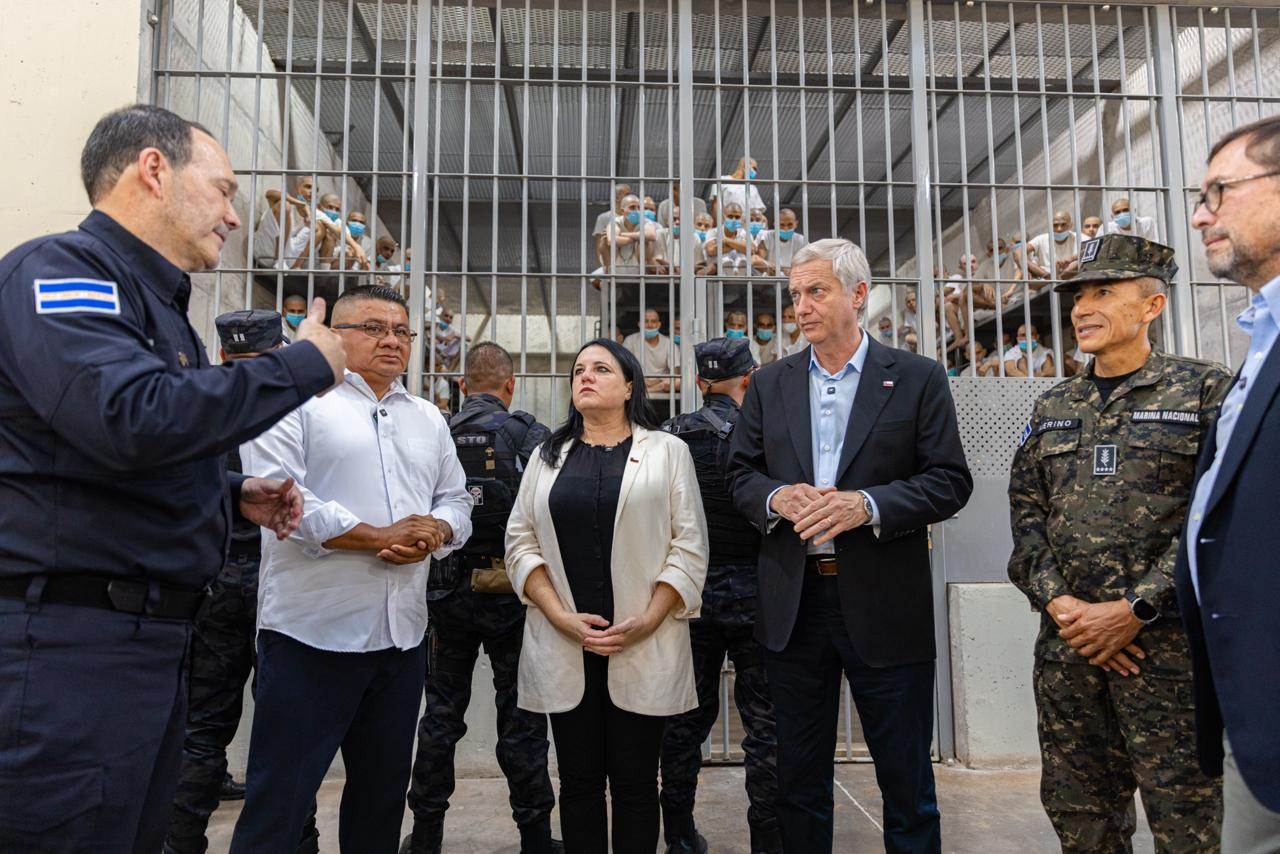
Kast touring the CECOT prison in El Salvador, 2026

=== Beginning of the Presidency ===
Kast was inaugurated as President of Chile on 11 March 2026. He assumed office without an absolute majority in Congress and will need to form coalitions with right-wing and centrist parties. The Senate is evenly divided, and the balance of power in the lower house rests with the populist Party of the People.

During his first week in office, Kast launched talks with the United States on collaboration in rare-earth mineral mining. He also commenced construction of a border wall along Chile's frontier with Peru. A disaster recovery bill submitted to Congress included corporate tax cuts for large and medium-sized firms from 27% to 23%, an employment subsidy, and the elimination of property taxes for senior citizens. During the first couple of months of his administration, a controversy arised after he invited nearly 50 ex-classmates to have lunch in La Moneda (his official residence), in which the service was partially funded by public resources. His administration also suspended 43 environmental regulations, ending various restrictions on power plant emissions and smelting pollution.

José Antonio Kast proposed a pardon for armed officers (Carabineros) who were convicted of police brutality against civil participants in the 2019-2020 Chilean protests. Indeed, he publicly showed approval for a judicial resolution that dismissed Claudio Crespo's responsibility for making a protester blind. This measure might create a precedent that enables Carabineros to increase political repression.

Kast has characterized his administration as an emergency government, focused on addressing what he describes as urgent national crises—particularly public security, economic stagnation, and irregular migration—while deferring other political concerns. His cabinet has been described by El Dínamo as technocratic, with 16 of the 24 posts filled by non-party members; all cabinet members were also required to undergo hair drug testing. The cabinet notably includes two former defense lawyers for Augusto Pinochet and Jaime Campos, a member of the centre-left Radical Party.

One and a half months after taking office, the president's popularity declined in opinion polls, with his approval rating falling from 57% to 42%. In June 2026, his approval rating dropped to 34%, while his disapproval rating reached 52%. In September, his approval rating stands at 30%, compared with 58% disapproval. In November, his approval rating stands at just 18%, compared with 72% disapproval.

=== Cabinet ===
He announced his cabinet on 20 January 2026.

The Kast Cabinet
Office	Name	Party	Term
President	José Antonio Kast	PRCh	11 March 2026–
Interior	Claudio Alvarado	UDI	11 March 2026–
Foreign Affairs	Francisco Pérez Mackenna	Ind.	11 March 2026–
Defense	Fernando Barros	Ind.	11 March 2026–
Finance	Jorge Quiroz	Ind.	11 March 2026–
Gen. Sec. of the Presidency	José García Ruminot	RN	11 March 2026–
Gen. Sec. of Government	Mara Sedini	Ind.	11 March 2026–19 May 2026
Economy, Development & Tourism	Daniel Mas	Ind.	11 March 2026–
Social Development & Family	María Jesús Wulf	PRCh	11 March 2026–
Education	María Paz Arzola	Ind.	11 March 2026–
Justice & Human; Rights	Fernando Rabat	Ind.	11 March 2026–
Labor & Social Welfare	Tomás Rau	Ind.	11 March 2026–
Public Works	Martín Arrau	PRCh	11 March 2026–
Health	May Chomalí	Ind.	11 March 2026–
Housing & Urbanism	Iván Poduje	PRCh	11 March 2026–
Agriculture	Jaime Campos	PR	11 March 2026–
Mining	Daniel Mas	Ind.	11 March 2026–
Transport & Telecommunications	Louis de Grange	Ind.	11 March 2026–
National Assets	Catalina Parot	Evópoli	11 March 2026–
Energy	Ximena Rincón	D	11 March 2026–
Environment	Francisca Toledo	Ind.	11 March 2026–
Women & Gender; Equality	Judith Marín	PSC	11 March 2026–
Culture & the Arts	Francisco Undurraga	Evópoli	11 March 2026–
Science, Technology, Knowledge & Innovation	Ximena Lincolao	Ind.	11 March 2026–
Public Security	Trinidad Steinert	Ind.	11 March 2026–19 May 2026

Kast announced the resignation of Public Safety Minister Trinidad Steinert and Government Spokesperson Mara Sedini, less than three months into his administration.

=== Foreign relations ===
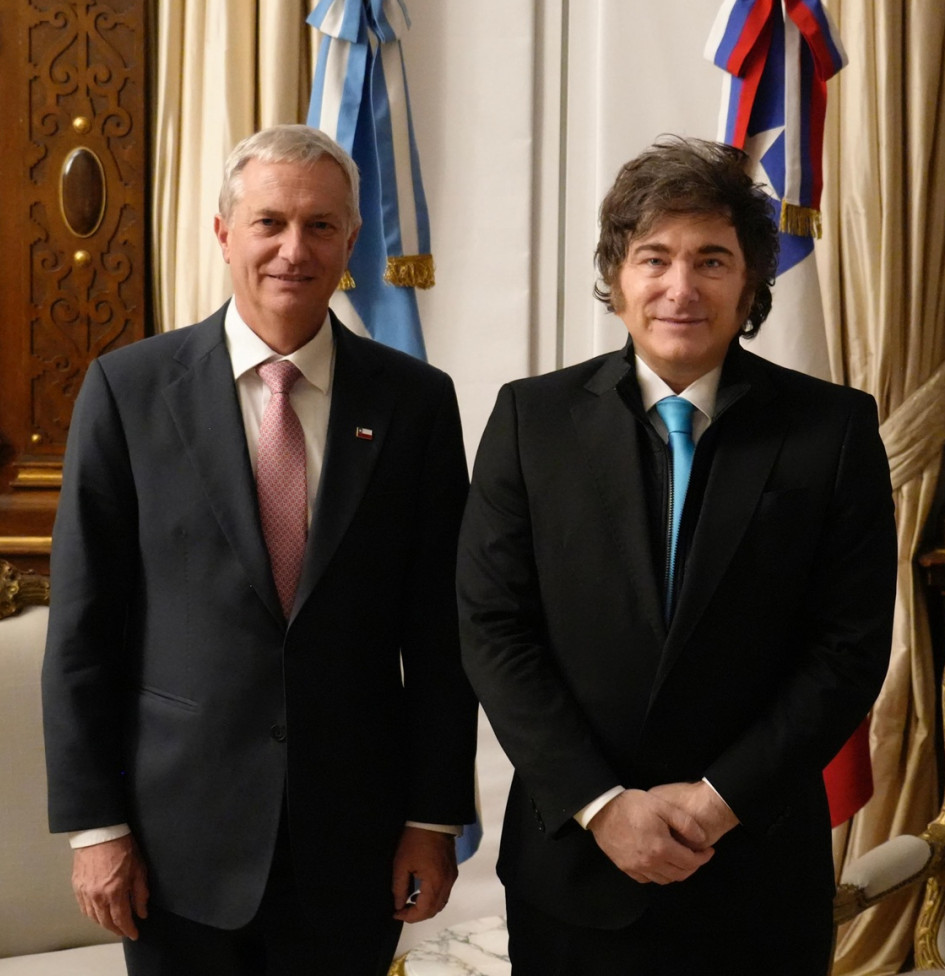
Kast with Javier Milei, following his election as president, 16 December 2025

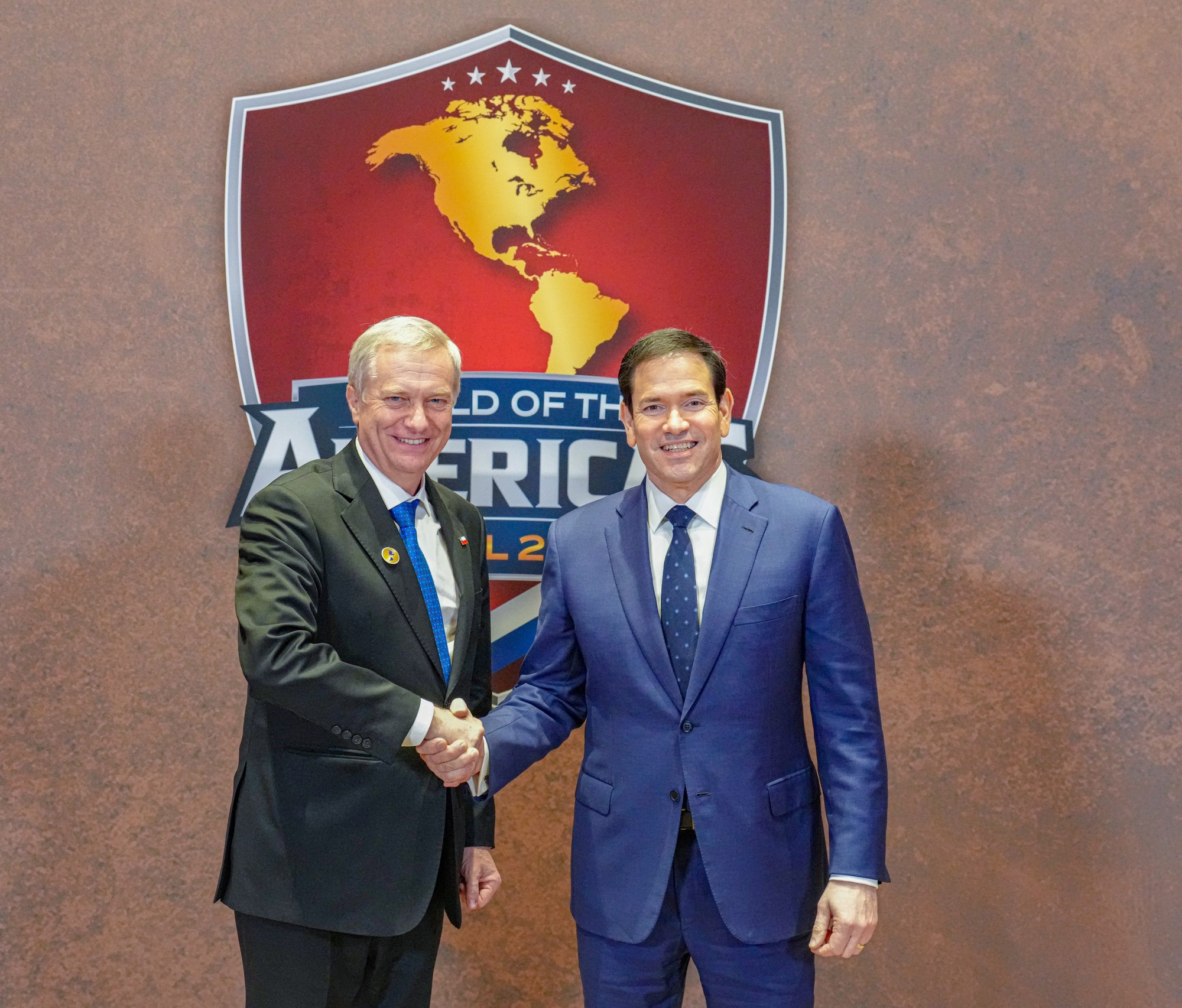
Kast with Marco Rubio during the Shield of the Americas Summit, 7 March 2026

Internationally, Kast has links with other right-wing figures, including support from Donald Trump. He is a founding member of the anti-communist Madrid Forum, having signed the Madrid Charter.

A supporter of Israel, Kast has accused President Gabriel Boric of antisemitism, labeling his administration's critical stance toward Israel as "ideological and irresponsible".

Following the 2026 United States strikes in Venezuela, Kast defended the operation, and said that the capture of Nicolás Maduro was "great news for the region".

In early February 2026, then-President-elect Kast went to Europe, where he visited the Transatlantic Summit and held meetings with the European Conservatives and Reformists Group and MEPs from Patriots for Europe. The visit did not include official meetings with European Union institutions.

=== Economic policy ===
José Antonio Kast has frequently been compared to the Chicago Boys, a group of neoliberal economists who played a major role during the military dictatorship and to which his brother, Miguel Kast, belonged. On 22 April, the head of state submitted to Congress a bill entitled "National Reconstruction and Economic and Social Development." The proposal aims to stimulate private investment as a means of reviving economic growth. This approach was summarized by the Minister of Finance, Jorge Quiroz, who stated that restoring competitiveness would attract investment, generate growth, and create jobs. The bill provides for a gradual reduction of corporate tax for medium-sized and large companies, from 27% to 23% over four years, as well as a reduction in value-added tax on the repatriation of capital. It also includes measures to speed up environmental impact assessment procedures and provisions to finance reconstruction efforts following the major wildfires of 2024 and 2026. These policy orientations have drawn strong criticism from the opposition. Several political leaders argue that the reform would benefit the wealthiest segments of society and exacerbate inequality. At the same time, the government amended the fuel price stabilization mechanism, leading to a sharp increase in gasoline (30%) and diesel (60%) prices. An announcement concerning the abolition of tuition-free university education for students over the age of 30 was also made, before being withdrawn following public criticism.

== Personal life ==
Kast married María Pía Adriasola on 20 December 1990; the couple have nine children. He is a practicing Roman Catholic and a member of the Schoenstatt Movement. Following his assumption to the presidency, he and his wife, who assumed her role as First Lady, relocated their official residence to the Moneda Palace.

Before becoming President, Kast lived with his family in Paine, a suburban commune to the southeast of central Santiago.

== Honours ==
=== National honours ===
- Grand Master (2026) and Collar of the Order of Merit
- Grand Master (2026) and Collar of the Order of Bernardo O'Higgins

== Awards and recognition ==
- In 2023, the Municipality of Lima, under mayor Rafael López Aliaga, decorated Kast "for his role in the protection of human life, marriage, family and freedom of conscience."

== Notes ==
Chamber of Deputies of Chile
Preceded by Pablo Longueira	Member of the Chamber of Deputies for Santiago Metropolitan Region's 24th and 30th district 2002–2018	District abolished
Party political offices
New political party	Republican Party nominee for President of Chile; 2021 & 2025	Most recent
New alliance	Christian Social Front nominee for President of Chile; 2021	Most recent
Political offices
Preceded by Gabriel Boric	President of Chile; 2026–present	Incumbent
