= Pablo Kast =

Chilean politician and architect

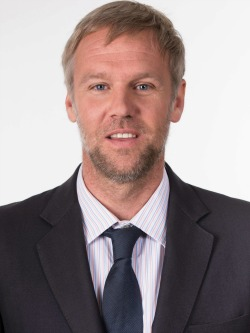
- Official portrait, 2018

Member of the Chamber of Deputies of Chile
- In office 11 March 2018 – 11 March 2022
- Preceded by: Creation of the charge
- Constituency: District 6

Personal details
- Born: 24 August 1973 (age 53) Chicago, Illinois
- Party: Evópoli (2012–present)
- Spouse: Juana Edwards Urrejola
- Children: 4
- Parent(s): Miguel Kast; Cecilia Sommerhoff
- Relatives: José Antonio Kast (uncle); José Antonio Kast Adriasola (cousin); Felipe and Tomás Kast (brothers); Michael Kast (grandfather); Javier Etcheberry (stepfather); Robert Schumann (great-great-great-grandfather); Clara Schumann (great-great-great-grandmother); Elizabeth Subercaseaux (cousin once removed); Gerd Sommerhoff (grand-uncle)
- Education: Pontifical Catholic University of Chile (BA)
- Occupation: Politician
- Profession: Architect

Pablo Andrés Kast Sommerhoff (born 24 August 1973) is a Chilean architect and politician, member of Evópoli.

He is the son of economist Miguel Kast, who migrated from Germany to Chile as a child with his German father Michael Kast.
