= Stéphanie Alenda =

French sociologist

- Born: Nice, France

Academic background
- Education: University of Nice Sophia Antipolis (BA, 1993) (MD, 1994); Ecole des Hautes Etudes en Sciences Sociales (PgD, 1996); Lille University of Science and Technology (PhD, 2001)

Academic work
- Discipline: Sociology; Political science; Political Sociology
- Institutions: Lille University of Science and Technology; University of Nice Sophia Antipolis; Universidad de Chile; Andrés Bello National University

Stéphanie Alenda is a French sociologist, who is known for her writings about the Chileand right-wing. She primarily focuses on three aspects of change within Chilean politics: social, subsidiarity, and liberalism.

Alenda has made most of her career in Chile, where she founded the School of Sociology at Andrés Bello National University (UNAB) in 2009. Currently, she is the Chair of the Research Committee on Political Sociology of the International Sociological Association (ISA) and the International Political Science Association (IPSA) (2018−2023).

She has been interviewed by the newspapers Le Figaro, Qué Pasa Magazine, and La Segunda. She has been a columnist in newspapers, including The Clinic and El Mostrador, in which she wrote columns about French political affairs.

== Biography ==
=== Early life ===
Alenda graduated from the University of Nice Sophia Antipolis in 1993, where she obtained two BA degrees (Modern Literature and Literature & Spanish Civilization), followed by a master's degree in Literature & Spanish Civilization in 1994. While she was achieving her postgraduate diploma in Latin American studies at the École des Hautes Études en Sciences Sociales in Paris, she was awarded a scholarship from the French Institute for Andean Studies to conduct doctoral fieldwork in Bolivia.

After finishing her PhD in Political Sociology at Lille University of Science and Technology in 2001, she obtained a research grant to carry out her postdoctoral studies in 2003 at the Lavoisier Programme, French Ministry of Foreign Affairs.

She was an assistant professor at the Institute of Public Affairs of the University of Chile and the editor of the institute's political science journal, Revista Política (2004–2012).

=== Sociology at UNAB: 2009−present ===
In 2009, she founded the School of Sociology at Andrés Bello National University (UNAB). According to information from the university, Alenda has been part of the executive board of the Research Committee in Political Sociology (CPS) since 2015, which is affiliated with the International Sociological Association (ISA) and the International Political Science Association (IPSA). In 2016, she reached an agreement with the Brazilian Political Science Association (ABCP) for the CPS to have a stable presence at each meeting. Alenda stated:

«For the UNAB, my presence in this top-level international group is very powerful, as there are only two South American members: a Brazilian and me. The president of the CPS gave me the task of establishing links with the main political science associations in Latin America and I started with Brazil».

In 2018, she became the Director of Research at the UNAB Faculty of Education and Social Sciences and was elected as the Chair of the Research Committee on Political Sociology (2018−2023).

She gained renown in January 2020 during a seminar organized by the Centre of Public Studies (Centro de Estudios Públicos; CEP) called "The Chilean right in times of change" (La derecha chilena en época de cambios). In her presentation, she previewed the main findings of her book Anatomía de la derecha chilena: Estado, mercado y valores en tiempos de cambio (Anatomy of the Chilean Right: State, Market and Values in times of change). The presentation was commented on by the presidents of the three main parties (at the time) of the right-wing coalition Chile Vamos: Mario Desbordes (RN), Hernán Larraín Matte (Evópoli) and Jacqueline van Rysselberghe (UDI).

Anatomía de la derecha chilena was published in March 2020 by the Fondo de Cultura Económica and, despite the challenges posited by the COVID-19 pandemic, the first printing quickly sold out.

== Works ==
=== Books ===
- Anatomy of the Chilean right-wing: State, market and values in times of changes. Santiago, Chile, Fondo de Cultura Económica, 2020.

=== Articles ===
- Les avatars de la nouvelle droite chilienne: La fabrique d'une institution partisane (1967−2010). Politix Magazine. Vol 106. N°2. pp. 159−187 (28 pages). 2014.
- «Cambio e institucionalización de la "nueva derecha" Chilena (1967−2010). Revista de Sociología e Politica. Vol 22. N°52. pp. 159−180 (21 pages). 2014.
- «La batalla por las ideas en tiempos posideológicos: Adaptaciones y permanencias ideológicas en la nueva centroderecha chilena». Revista de Sociologia e Politica. N°70. Article e004. 2019.
- «How similar are the attitudes of male and female party leaders? Gender gaps and moderation in the chilean center-right». Economics and Politics Magazine. N°1. Vol. 6. pp. 31−58 (27 pages). 2020.
- «The Chilean right at the crossroads: counterhegemony of subnational and solidary leaderships». CIDOB d'Afers Internacionals Magazine. N°126, pp. 65–87 (22 pages). 2020.
- «Satisfaction and recognition in precarious occupations: The case of waste collectors in Chile». Left-wings Magazine. N°49. pp. 848−865 (17 pages). 2020.
- «Ni crisis ni panaceas. Dinámicas y transformaciones de los sistemas partidarios en América Latina». Colombia International Magazine. N°103. pp. 3−28 (25 pages). July 2020.
