= Cecilia Morel =

Former First Lady of Chile

Cecilia Morel Montes
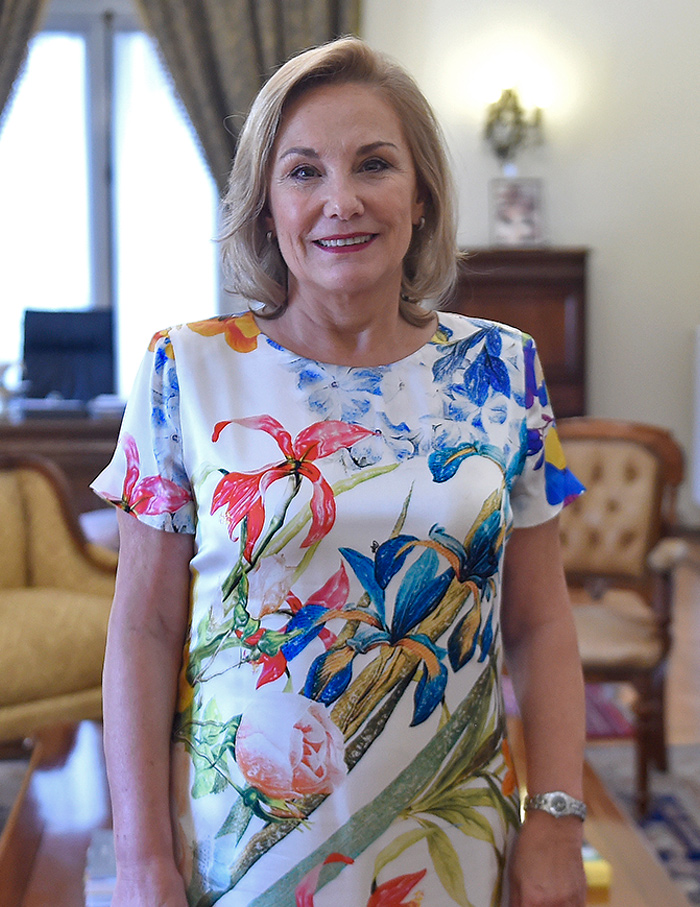
- Official portrait, 2018

First Lady of Chile
- In role 11 March 2018 – 11 March 2022
- President: Sebastián Piñera
- Preceded by: Vacant
- Succeeded by: Irina Karamanos
- In role 11 March 2010 – 11 March 2014
- President: Sebastían Piñera
- Preceded by: Luisa Durán de la Fuente (2006)
- Succeeded by: Vacant

Personal details
- Born: María Cecilia Morel Montes; 14 January 1954 (age 72) Santiago, Chile
- Party: National Renewal (before 2011)
- Spouse: Sebastián Piñera (m. 1973; died 2024)
- Children: 4
- Occupation: Family counselor

María Cecilia Morel Montes (born 14 January 1954) is the widow of the former president of Chile Sebastián Piñera, and as such is a former first lady of Chile. Morel was also the director of the sociocultural area of the presidency during both her husband's terms as president.

== Family life ==
Cecilia Morel is the fourth of seven children born to Eduardo Morel Chaigneau and Paulina Montes Brunet, the sister of Hugo Montes Brunet. She attended grade school at the College Jeanne d'Arc de Santiago de Chile, the school where her mother and grandmother (Consuelo Brunet Bunster) also studied.

At the age of 18 in 1972, she began dating Sebastián Piñera, who was her neighbor in the Avenida Américo Vespucio, in the eastern sector of Santiago. They married in 1973 and the couple moved to the United States in December 1974 where he studied economics.

Her husband died in a helicopter crash on February 6, 2024.

== Advanced studies and social work ==
In 1972, she began to study nursing at the Catholic University of Chile, but put her studies on hold when she moved abroad with her husband. She resumed her studies when they returned to Chile, which she continued until the birth of her second daughter, Cecilia. She was one semester short of graduating.

She then entered the Instituto Profesional Carlos Casanueva, from which she graduated as a family and youth counselor. She also holds a degree in family and human relations from Universidad Mayor.

In 1989, together with professionals from Instituto Carlos Casanueva (Enrique Cueto), founded what later became "La Casa de la Juventud", with the task of educating young people from Conchalí with growth and personal development workshops. Later, the Women Embark Foundation was derived from this project.

== First Lady (2010–2014, 2018–2022) ==
As First Lady, Cecilia Morel has been appointed chair of a number of Chilean organisations.

- Integra Foundation pre-school education network
- PRODEMU, The Foundation for the Advancement of Women
- Youth and Children Orchestras
- Mirador Interactive Museum
- Handicrafts of Chile
- Family Foundation.

She accompanied the President on a state visit to Spain in March 2011. President was granted the rank of Collar of the Order of Isabella the Catholic and his wife, the Dame Grand Cross of the same.

In November 2011, she welcomed Felipe, Prince of Asturias and Princess Letizia of Spain at the opening of an exhibition of the work of the Spanish photographer Chema Madoz in Santiago.

== Copiapó mining accident ==
Following the 2010 Copiapó mining accident, Piñera and Morel gave a press conference before the start of the rescue operation on 12 October 2010. They were together the entire time at the site of the rescue of the Chilean miners, who were trapped deep underground.

When the first miner, Florencio Ávalos, was rescued, the miner's seven-year-old son burst into tears, as did the First Lady.

== Honours ==
- Norway:
  - Grand Cross of the Royal Norwegian Order of Merit (27 March 2019)
- Spain:
  - Dame Grand Cross of the Order of Isabella the Catholic (4 March 2011)

=== Arms ===
Chilean arms
(Attributed)

As Dame Grand Cross of the Order of Isabella the Catholic
(Attributed)

Honorary titles
Preceded by Luisa Durán	First Lady of Chile; 2010—2014	Vacant
Vacant	First Lady of Chile; 2018—2022	Succeeded by Irina Karamanos
