= Irina Karamanos =

Chilean anthropologist and political scientist (born 1989)

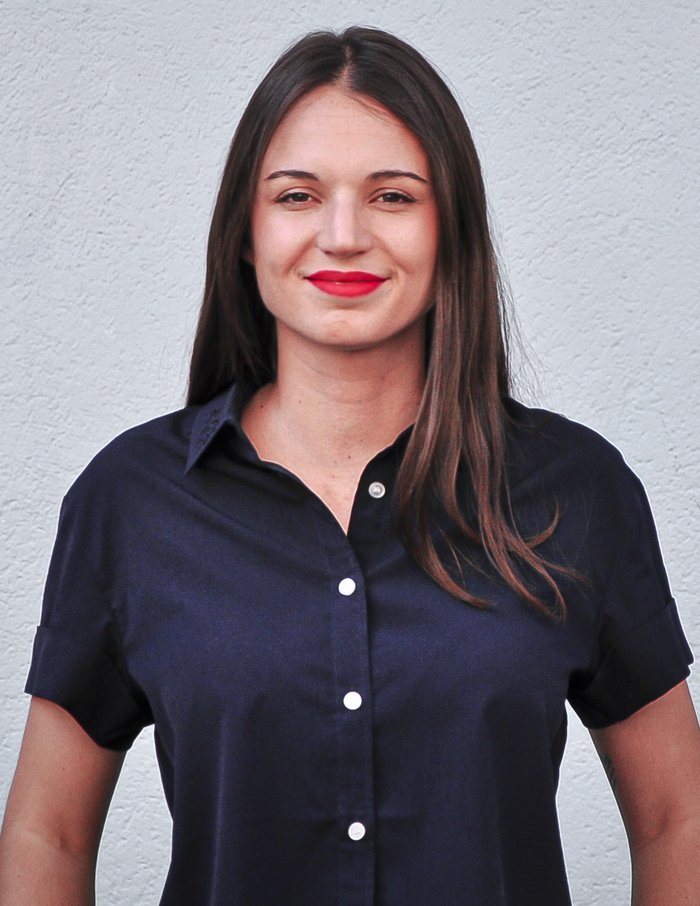
- Official portrait, 2022

First Lady of Chile
- In role 11 March 2022 – 29 December 2022
- President: Gabriel Boric
- Preceded by: Cecilia Morel
- Succeeded by: Pía Adriasola (2026)

Sociocultural Coordinator of the Republic's Presidency
- In role 11 March 2022 – 29 December 2022
- President: Gabriel Boric
- Preceded by: Cecilia Morel
- Succeeded by: Office abolished

Personal details
- Born: 29 October 1989 (age 36) Santiago, Chile
- Party: Social Convergence (2019–2024); Autonomist Movement (2016–2019)
- Domestic partner(s): Gabriel Boric (2019–2023)
- Education: Heidelberg University; University of Chile
- Occupation: Anthropologist; political scientist

Irina Sabine Alice Karamanos Adrian (born 29 October 1989) is a Chilean sociologist, as the then partner of President Gabriel Boric, served as first lady of Chile and sociocultural coordinator of the Presidency of the Republic between March and December 2022, when both positions were officially dissolved.

== Early life ==
Irina Sabine Alice Karamanos Adrian was born in Santiago on 29 October 1989. Her father, schoolteacher Jorge Karamanos Eleftheriu, was born in Chile to Greek parents from Kymi and was a leader of Santiago's Greek community in the 1980s. Her mother, German-to-Spanish translator Sabine Adrian Gierke, was born in Uruguay to German parents. As a result of her background, Karamanos is fluent in Spanish, Greek, German, and English. She earned a Bachelor or Arts from Heidelberg University.

== Career ==
Karamanos is an influential figure in her political party, Social Convergence, where she leads the Feminist Front. She was associated with the Autonomist Movement from 2016 until it was absorbed into Social Convergence in 2019.

Karamanos dating politician Gabriel Boric in 2019, and became First Lady of Chile and Director of the Sociocultural Area of the Presidency when he started his presidential term on 11 March 2022. The couple initially opposed the existence of the First Lady role, with Karamanos stating that it needed to be rethought to reflect the changing times and power dynamics. However, she later decided to take on the role and reform it from within. She expressed her intention to focus on issues related to transgender rights and child migration. Her decision to assume the role and preserve its existence was met with both support and pushback from various feminist groups in Chile. Boric and Karamanos announced their split on 16 November 2023, ending her tenure as First Lady.

Honorary titles
Preceded by Cecilia Morel	First Lady of Chile; 2022–2023	Vacant Title next held by Pía Adriasola
