= Hernán Larraín Matte =

Chilean lawyer and politician

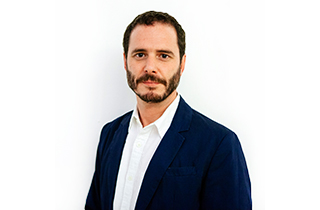
- Larraín in 2015

Member of the Constitutional Convention of Chile
- In office 4 July 2021 – 4 July 2022
- Preceded by: office established
- Constituency: 11th District

President of Political Evolution
- In office 6 May 2018 – 19 July 2020

Personal details
- Born: 24 December 1974 (age 51) Santiago, Chile
- Party: Evópoli (2013–present)
- Other political affiliations: National Renewal (2010–2013)
- Education: Universidad Finis Terrae (LL.B); Pontifical Catholic University of Chile (M.D.); London School of Economics (M.Sc.)
- Occupation: Political
- Profession: Lawyer

Hernán Larraín Matte (born 24 December 1974) is a Chilean lawyer and politician involved in centre-right politics. Larraín is an adjunct professor at the Adolfo Ibáñez University and during Sebastián Piñera's first government (2010–2014) he was presidential advisor. Then, he presided political party Evópoli (2018–2020).

He studied laws at Finis Terrae University (1993–1999) and after obtaining his Bachelor of Laws, he decided to study a master's degree in Political Sciences in the Pontificia Universidad Católica de Chile (PUC; 2000–2001). Years later, he completed his M.Sc. in public policies at England's London School of Economics (LSE).

== Biography ==
Born in 1974, he is the eldest son of Hernan Larraín and Magdalena Matte, politicians whose families have had a vast trajectory both into the Chilean elite and that country's right–wing. Likewise, Hernán is brother of the filmmakers Pablo Larraín and Juan de Dios Larraín.

=== Political career ===
In 2008, Larraín was general marketing coordinator of Sebastián Piñera's campaign for his first term as president. Following Piñera's victory at 2009 presidential election, he joined to Renovación Nacional (RN) in 2010 and became President's communications advisor since that year until 2013. That year he renounced to that position in order to join a political project linked to the think tank Horizontal (directed by him from 2013 to 2015), organization close to then nacient political party Evópoli, a conservative-liberal and centre-right party (where he finished joining). In December, he participated in the presidencial campaign of Evelyn Matthei (UDI) who lost against Michelle Bachelet from centre–left's Socialist Party of Chile.

On January 29, 2015, his party was one of the founding members of centre-right coalition Chile Vamos. In mid-2017, Larraín helped to Felipe Kast in the coalition's presidential primary that lost (15%) against Piñera (58%) and Manuel José Ossandón (26%). Months later, he participated in the campaign of Piñera during the presidential elections which he won.

On May 5, 2018, Larraín was elected president of Evópoli in the party's internal elections. On July 19, 2020, in the midst of Chile Vamos crisis (after 2019–20 Social Outbreak and COVID-19 pandemic), he formalized his resignation as president of the organization.

In 2021, he was registered as a candidate for the Constitutional Convention by District 11 (Las Condes, Vitacura, Lo Barnechea, La Reina y Peñalolén), and then won a seat into the Constitutional Convention that drafted a new constitution proposal for Chile.

On 4 July 2021, Larrain was invested as constituent. On 12 April 22, he assumed as adjunct vice president of the convention.

In May 2025, Hernán Larraín Matte launched The Liberal Right Does Exist. The book is a first-person account of a collective effort to expand the boundaries of the Chilean right, leaving behind the dictatorship and consolidating a project committed to individual freedoms, diversity, market competition, and gradual reformism.
