= Michael Kast =

German soldier and businessman (1924–2014)

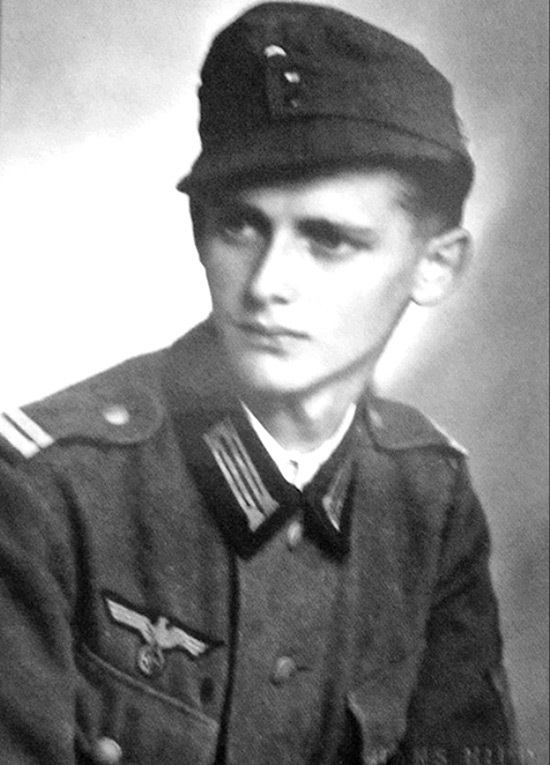
- Kast in army uniform as a Fahnenjunker, c. 1942
- Born: Michael Martin Kast; 2 April 1924; Thalkirchdorf, Bavaria, Germany
- Died: 9 May 2014 (aged 90); Buin, Chile
- Spouse: Olga Maria Kreszencia Rist (m. 1946)
- Children: 10, including Miguel, Bárbara and José Antonio
- Relatives: Pablo, Felipe, Tomás and José Antonio Kast Adriasola (grandsons)
- Military career
- Allegiance: Nazi Germany
- Branch: German Army
- Service years: 1942–1945
- Rank: Oberleutnant
- Conflicts: World War II: Eastern Front; Battle of Korsun–Cherkassy; Mediterranean theatre; Italian campaign (POW)

Michael Martin Kast (German pronunciation: [ˈmɪçaʔeːl ˈmaʁtiːn kast]; 2 April 1924 – 9 May 2014) was a German and Chilean military officer and businessman. Many of his descendants are prominent in Chilean politics and business. His son, José Antonio Kast, is the 38th President of Chile.

== Early life ==
Michael Martin Kast was born in Thalkirchdorf, a small Bavarian village in Germany, on 2 April 1924. His father was from Ulm and in 1893, created a powdered milk factory in Wiedemannsdorf, Oberstaufen that was one of three in Germany to produce the recently invented product.

German historian Armin Nolzen has written that Kast likely was a member of the Hitler Youth from the age of 14 to 18, basically mandatory at that time. German Federal Archives show that Kast joined the Nazi Party in September 1942 when about 10% of the population were party members.

Michael Buddrus of the Leibniz Institute for Contemporary History downplayed the significance of NSDAP membership in people that young, but agreed that Kast must have joined voluntarily.

"If you're a party member, you're a party member," said Richard F. Wetzell, an American historian at the German Historical Institute. "Being a party member does bind you to the party and its ideology even though many may have joined for purely opportunistic reasons."

== World War II ==
Kast and seven of his brothers joined the German Army, with Kast serving as part of his obligatory military service. Reportedly, of the eight Kast brothers who fought in World War II, only three survived.

In 1942, Kast was first deployed on garrison duty in occupied France, from summer 1943 on stationed in Crimea. From there, Kast and his men managed to flee westward in March 1944 before the Soviet army could cut off the escape routes. After completing a military training course in Austria, which he finished as a lieutenant, he was deployed to Italy in 1944 to defend the Gothic Line in the Apennine Mountains. In an interview in 1995, Michael Kast described this transfer to Italy as his "salvation". Shortly after the surrender of the German Army in Italy, he was captured by an American unit near Trento in May 1945. Kast escaped from custody during a guard change the following month and fled back to his home town in Southern Bavaria. In the uncertainty and fear of the last days of the war, a friend ("Herr Bers") convinced him to destroy his military ID and got a false ID indicating he was a member of the International Committee of the Red Cross.

== Life in Chile ==
In Bavaria, Kast met his future wife, born Olga Maria Kreszencia Rist (26 October 1924 – 15 May 2015) but generally known in Chile thereafter as Olga Rist Hagspiel, in accordance with Spanish language naming traditions, whereby both parents' surnames are formally and legally carried. The two were married on 26 October 1946, in Thalkirchdorf. Kast began to assume a false identity in 1947 during the denazification period, though when applying for his denazification certificate German officials initially did not approve one for Kast, although a prosecutor friendly to him burned Kast's Nazi records. Following this, he emigrated to Argentina and later to Chile. It has been claimed that he received support from Vatican ratlines helping former war criminals to escape. He arrived in Chile in December 1950 and settled in Buin, a commune within the present-day Santiago Metropolitan Region.

Kast's wife, along with their two German-born children (Michael (later Miguel) and Barbara), arrived in Chile soon after. He founded the sausage factory Cecinas Bavaria in 1962, which is currently owned by his son, Christian Kast Rist. Kast was publicly honored by the Municipality of Buin (1985), the Chamber of Commerce of Buin (1989), and the Carabineros of Buin (1992). He also helped in the construction of six churches in Buin. A branch of firefighters in Buin bears his name, calling itself the "Brigada Juvenil Miguel Kast" ("Miguel Kast Youth Brigade"). In 1995, he was granted Chilean citizenship.

== Death ==
Kast died on 10 May 2014, at the age of 90. His wake was at the Santos Ángeles Custodios Church, in Buin, the following day.

=== Involvement in Nazi Germany ===
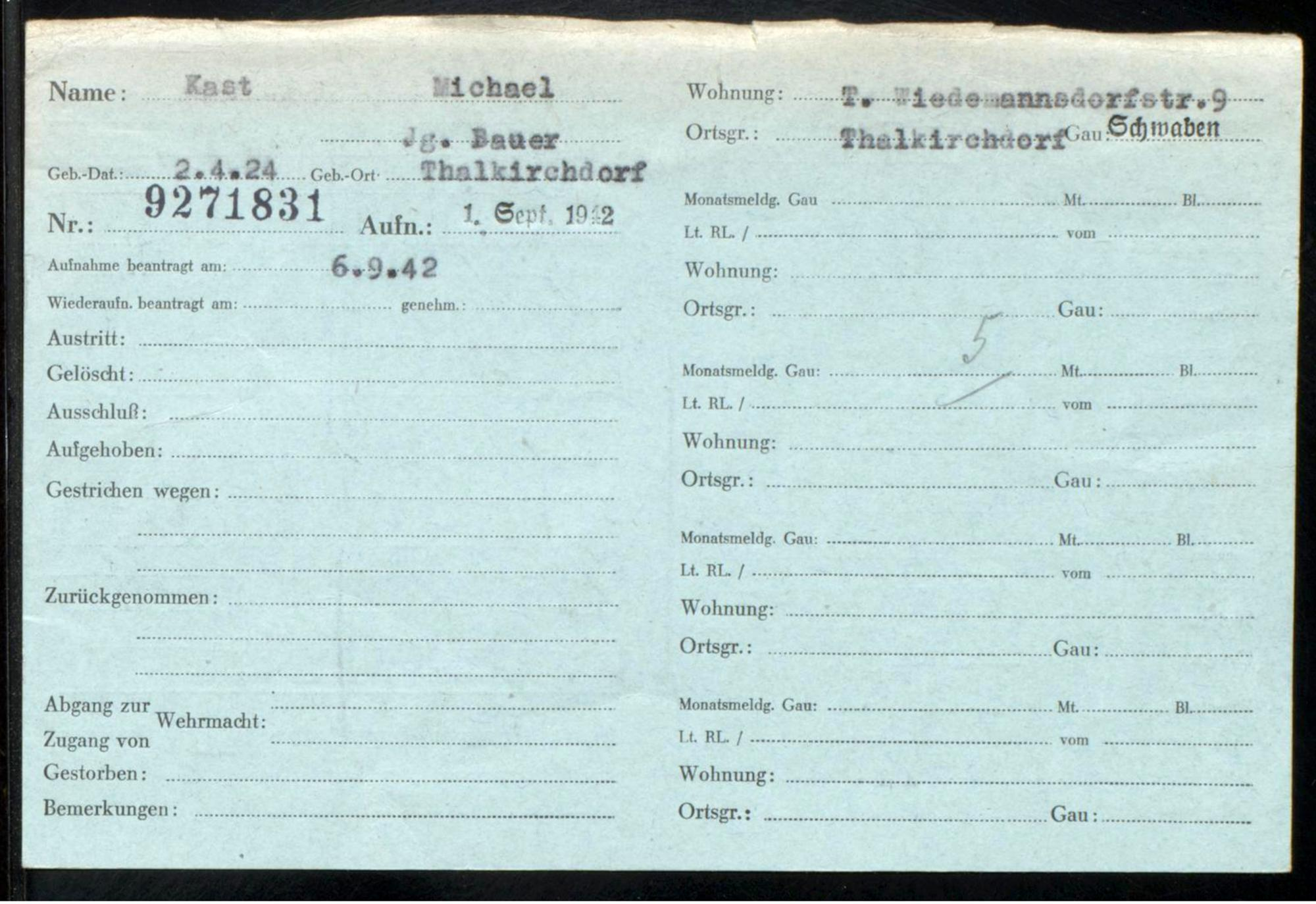
Kast's Nazi Party membership card from 1942

Journalist Javier Rebolledo described Michael Kast in his book A la sombra de los cuervos (2015) as an officer of the Nazi Army who falsified his papers to evade a condemnation by the Allies and escaped to Chile – similar to the war criminal Walter Rauff. José Antonio Kast disputed this in the strongest terms in an article written for The Clinic. His father, "an exemplary man," is being portrayed in this book in a negative light by the addition of biographies and stories that have nothing to do with his father. He alleged that his father could have not committed any war crimes during his time in the German army, as his father often visited his home village in Southern Bavaria in his later years. This also proves that his documents were in order and not falsified. He made it clear that, like millions of other German men, military service was compulsory. In 2021, Gabriel Boric, the main political opponent of José Antonio Kast in the 2021 Chilean general elections, accused José Antonio Kast of being a hypocrite, as "migrating is a right and sometimes it is also a tragedy. Your father himself was a migrant after having fought in the Nazi army".

After this, it was revealed that Michael Kast was indeed member of the Nazi Party, in a way contradicting former statements of José Antonio Kast, that his father was no supporter of the Nazi movement.

=== Involvement in Pinochet dictatorship ===
Rebolledo and Guzmán also wrote that Kast (along with his son Miguel) were associated with the Pinochet dictatorship's National Information Center, taking part in the capture and forced disappearance of Pedro Vargas, who had been organizing workers at Kast's business.

José Antonio Kast also claimed it was impossible for his father to have been involved in the disappearance of Pedro Vargas, due to the fact that Vargas's father and brother (Bernabé and Jorge) had kept working at the Kast family's sausage factory after Pedro Vargas's disappearance.

== Personal life ==
Michael Kast had 10 children (2 of whom were born in Germany and 8 in Chile), 50 grandchildren (at the time of his death) and some 20 great-grandchildren (at the time of his death). Two of his children died in their youth; one by drowning and the other in a car crash. Many of his children and grandchildren have had important roles in Chilean politics, serving as deputies and senators. A son of his died from bone cancer at age 34.

- Michael "Miguel" Kast Rist (1948–1983), economist, member of the Chicago Boys, and Minister of State and President of the Central Bank under the dictatorship of Augusto Pinochet; married to Cecilia Sommerhoff Hyde (born 1951, niece of Gerd Sommerhoff); 5 children
  - Bárbara Kast Sommerhoff (born 1968), sociologist
  - Michael Kast Sommerhoff (born 1968), priest
  - Pablo Kast Sommerhoff (born 1973), architect and Member of the Chamber of Deputies (2018-2022); married to Juana Edwards Urrejola; 4 children
  - Felipe Kast Sommerhoff (born 1977), architect, economist, Member of the Chamber of Deputies (2014-2018), Senator (2018-2026); married to Emelia Puga Bermúdez (born 1980); 4 children
  - Tomás Kast Sommerhoff (born 1979), engineer and Councilman of Vitacura (2021-2025), Member of the Chamber of Deputies (2026-)
- Bárbara Kast Rist (1950-1968) known for her deep religious devotion and involvement in the Schoenstatt Movement.
- Erika Kast Rist (born 1954), married to businessman Alfonso Maira Carlini (born 1948); 8 children, including
  - Cristóbal Maira Kast (born 1974), owner of Agricola Rayenco
  - Consuelo Maira Kast (born 1978), businesswoman
  - Catalina Maira Kast (born 1984), investor
  - Esteban Maira Kast (born 1986), lawyer
- Christian Kast Rist (born 1957), businessman and owner of Cecinas Bavaria; married to Pamela Prett Weber (born 1960); 4 children, including
  - Mónica Kast Prett (born 1980), historian
  - Andrea Kast Prett (born 1984), businesswoman, executive of Cecinas Bavaria
  - Cristian Kast Prett (born 1986), businessman
- Verónica Kast Rist (born 1960), married to Andrés Tocornal Vial (born 1955); 6 children
- Gabriela Kast Rist (born 1960), author; 8 children
- Hans Kast Rist (born 1961), served as a Roman Catholic priest for 25 years until leaving the priesthood in 2020
- Rita Kast Rist (born 1962), businesswoman; married to Gonzalo Urcelay Montecinos (born 1959); 7 children, including
  - Gonzalo Urcelay Kast (born 1986), lawyer
  - María Fernanda Urcelay Kast, lawyer
- José Antonio Kast Rist (born 1966), lawyer, politician, Member of the Chamber of Deputies (2014–2018), presidential candidate in 2017, 2021 and 2025 (where he was elected) and founder of the Republican Party of Chile; married to María Pía Adriasola Barroilhet (born 1966); 9 children.
  - José Antonio Kast Adriasola (born 1993), politician, Member of the Chamber of Deputies (2026-)
