= María Angélica Cristi =

Chilean politician

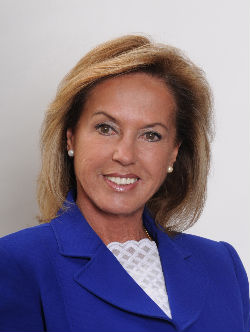

Member of the Chamber of Deputies
- In office 11 March 1990 – 11 March 2014
- Preceded by: District created
- Succeeded by: José Antonio Kast
- Constituency: 24th District

Mayor of Peñalolén
- In office 15 November 1984 – July 1989
- President: Augusto Pinochet
- Preceded by: Office created
- Succeeded by: Carlos Alarcón Castro

Personal details
- Born: 13 October 1941 (age 84) Santiago, Chile
- Party: National Renewal (1992−2002); Independent Democratic Union (2003−)
- Spouse: Julián Morrison
- Children: Three
- Education: Saint John's Villa Academy
- Alma mater: Pontifical Catholic University of Chile
- Occupation: Politician
- Profession: Sociologist

María Angélica Cristi Marfil (born 13 October 1941) is a Chilean politician who served as deputy and mayor in times of Augusto Pinochet's regime.

== Family and early life ==
She was born on 13 October 1941 in Santiago, Chile. She is the daughter of Óscar Cristi Gallo, a general of the Carabineros, and Amalia María Marfil Labarca.

She is the widow of Julián Morrison, a businessman and advertising executive, and is the mother of three children: Alan, Paul and Robert.

=== Education and professional life ===
She completed her primary and secondary education at Saint John’s Villa Academy, graduating in 1958. After finishing school, she enrolled in the School of Sociology at the Pontifical Catholic University of Chile, where she obtained a degree in sociology with a specialisation in social sciences in 1963.

Between 1970 and 1973, she lived in Japan. During that period, she studied for two years at the Naganuma Language Academy and at Sophia University in Tokyo, where she received training in Japanese history and art in 1970.

In 1973, she returned to Chile and the following year moved to the United States, where she remained for seven years. During that time, she undertook courses in sociology and communication.

== Political career ==
In 1981, after returning to Chile, she joined the Department of Social Programming of the Regional Secretariat of Planning and Coordination (SERPLAC) at the Metropolitan Region Intendancy.

In 1983, she assumed the position of head of operations at the National Board of School Assistance and Scholarships (JUNAEB).

In November 1984, she began her political career when she was appointed mayor—under the legislation in force at the time—of the newly created commune of Peñalolén, becoming the first mayor in the commune’s history. During her administration, she oversaw the eradication of informal settlements, the implementation of drinking water, electricity and sewage services, the paving of streets and alleys, the construction of a primary healthcare centre, and the creation of a technical–professional high school and the Juan Pablo II Special School for children with learning difficulties.

In July 1989, after five years as mayor, she resigned in order to run as an independent candidate for the Chamber of Deputies in District No. 24 (La Reina and Peñalolén), Metropolitan Region of Santiago, in the 1989 parliamentary elections. She obtained the highest vote share in the district with 47,633 votes, equivalent to 34.43% of the validly cast ballots. In subsequent elections, she was consistently re-elected in the same district with the highest district vote share.

In 1992, she formally joined the National Renewal (RN) party.

On 22 January 2002, she submitted her resignation from RN. She remained an independent until October 2003, when she joined the ranks of the Independent Democratic Union (UDI).
