= Guildism =

Social, political and economic ideology

Gremialismo, or guildism, is a right-wing to far-right social, political, and economic ideology, inspired by Catholic social teachings that claims that every correct social order should base itself in intermediary societies between persons and the state, which are created and managed in freedom, and that the order should serve only the purposes for which they were created.

== History ==
In Chile, gremialismo was the main doctrine of the liberal-conservative movement that emerged in the latter half of the 1960s, leading the opposition to the University Reform at the Catholic University of Chile. As such, it stood against both the left and the center movements. Gremialismo was influenced by Francoist-corporatism, even the economic views of it got rejected, they favored it's cultural views. Besides cultural similarities to integralism or even Falangism, gremialismo rejects corporatism and other left economic systems and supports capitalism Gremialismo advocates for anti-communism, Chilean nationalism, neo-conservatism and the social doctrine of the church.

The principal thinker of gremialismo was Jaime Guzmán, a lawyer and professor who later served as an advisor to Chilean dictator Augusto Pinochet.

There has been ongoing debate over whether gremialismo thought was influenced by Juan Vázquez de Mella as well (Even if Mella wasn't a capitalist).

The gremialist Javier Leturia wrote about the origins of the movement:

We [the gremialistas] were orderly, we were those that were not hippie, those that were not left-wing, those that were not potheads. I would say that the people were participative. That is why former school union leaders and people from school unions, the scouts, and religious movements were picked up. We openly supported the coup. We published a manifesto in the newspaper that read: "Towards a new institutionality through the renounce of Allende." [...] What we said was that the crisis was insurmountable and that the only solution was to have the armed forces take charge. We drafted that manifesto as university students, and it was signed by student unions from the Catholic universities of Santiago and Valparaíso, which were headed by gremialists. I would say that from the moment Allende was elected, many began to support a coup. I mean that we were not going to accept for this country to fall into communism.

== Role in military dictatorship youth policy ==
One of the first measures of the military dictatorship of Chile that came to power though the 1973 coup d'etat was to set up the Secretaría Nacional de la Juventud (SNJ, National Youth Office), which was done on October 28, 1973, even before the Declaration of Principles of the junta made in March 1974. It was a way of mobilizing sympathetic elements of the civil society in support for the dictatorship. The SNJ was created by the advice of Jaime Guzmán and was an example of the dictatorship adopting gremialism. Some right-wing student union leaders like Andrés Allamand were skeptical to the attempts as they were moulded from above and gathered disparate figures such as Miguel Kast, Antonio Vodanovic and Jaime Guzmán. Allamand and other young right-wingers also resented the dominance of gremialism in the SNJ since they considered it to be a closed gremialist club.

From 1975 to 1980, the SNJ arranged a series of ritualized acts in cerro Chacarillas reminiscent of Francoist Spain. The policy towards the sympathetic youth contrasted with the murder, surveillance, and forced disappearances that dissident youth faced from the regime. Most of the SNJ's documents were reportedly destroyed by the dictatorship in 1988.

== Similar ideology in Argentina ==
In the 1940s in Argentina, a movement emerged that reclaimed the role of intermediate social bodies, reconciling the medieval guilds with the modern structures of capitalism in the economy. A gremialismo obrero, patronal and intellectual developed. However, later it was associated with perónism, syndicalism and trade unionism.
