= Gerd Sommerhoff =

German school teacher and author (1915–2002)

Gerd Sommerhoff OBE
- Born: February 13, 1915; Wiesbaden, Germany
- Died: April 28, 2002 (aged 87); Cambridge, England, UK
- Relatives: Robert Schumann (great-grandfather); Clara Schumann (great-grandmother)

Academic background
- Education: Zurich Polytechnic; University of Oxford

Gerd Walter Christian Sommerhoff OBE (February 13, 1915 – April 28, 2002) was a secondary school science teacher in the UK and an author who focused on neuroscience.

== Early life and family ==
Sommerhoff and his twin sister were born in Wiesbaden, Germany, to Elizabeth Ruher and Walter Georg Sommerhoff, a wealthy banker who was born in New York to German merchant Arthur Louis Carl Sommerhoff (1844-1911) and his wife piano teacher Elise, née Schumann (1843–1928), the second child of Robert and Clara Schumann. Sommerhoff was a great-grandson of the German composers Robert Schumann and his wife Clara. The Sommerhoff family resided in Haarlem, Netherlands, until the loss of the family fortune in the Wall Street crash and the death of their father "in compromising circumstances". The two younger children moved to Ryde on the Isle of Wight in 1931 with their mother Elizabeth Sommerhoff when she married Major Bernard Francis Anne Vernon-Harcourt, while their elder brother, Walter Hans Sommerhoff, emigrated to Santiago, Chile. Sommerhoff studied engineering at Zurich Polytechnic (now ETH Zurich) and philosophy, politics and economics at University of Oxford. Sommerhoff was interned in Canada as an enemy alien until 1942.

== Career ==
Upon release from internment, Sommerhoff taught science at the Dragon School. While there, he used boxes of numbered cards, containing questions, answers, tutorial material, or descriptions of experiments, on a variety of different subjects. He presented science programmes for the BBC from 1960–1962 before being recruited to Sevenoaks School in 1963 by the headmaster Kim Taylor. His students included Tim Hunt and Alan Macfarlane.

== Child sexual abuse ==
Alice Hemmings reported allegations of sexual abuse dating from 1976 in The Sevenoaks Chronicle. The assault was reported to the Kent Police force by Stuart Neilson in 2012. Sommerhoff was also alleged to have displayed pornography to pupils and to have made obscene remarks including boasts of bestiality. Sevenoaks School agreed to settle a compensation claim by another pupil alleging sexual abuse by Sommerhoff at Sevenoaks School when he was 12 years old. According to the plaintiff's lawyer, Tracey Emmett, "Sommerhoff’s abuse may have been suspected by those who worked with him." Several further witnesses and victims have subsequently been identified, indicating that Sommerhoff was a preferential paedophile attracted to pubescent boys.

== Works ==
- Sommerhoff, Gerd (1950). Analytical Biology. Oxford University Press.
- Sommerhoff, Gerd (1974). Logic of the living brain. London: Wiley. ISBN 0-471-81305-2. OCLC 1014323.
- Sommerhoff, Gerd (1990). Life, brain, and consciousness : new perceptions through targeted systems analysis. Amsterdam: North-Holland. ISBN 0-444-88436-X. OCLC 20634326.
- Sommerhoff, Gerd; MacDorman, Karl (1994). "An account of consciousness in physical and functional terms: A target for research in the neurosciences". Integrative Physiological and Behavioral Science. 29 (2): 151–181. doi:10.1007/BF02691012. PMID 7947330. S2CID 17193883.
- Sommerhoff, Gerd (2000). Understanding consciousness : its function and brain processes. London: SAGE Publications. ISBN 978-0-85702-649-1. OCLC 646067977.
