= Evópoli =

Political party in Chile

Political Evolution Evolución Política
- President: Luciano Cruz-Coke Carvallo
- Secretary-General: Macarena Cornejo
- Chief of Deputies: Jorge Guzmán
- Chief of Senators: Luciano Cruz-Coke
- Founded: 12 December 2012
- Headquarters: Alberto Magno 1428, Providencia, Santiago
- Youth wing: Juventud Evópoli
- National affiliation: Chile Vamos (since 2015); Chile Grande y Unido (since 2025)
- Membership (2026): ▼14,277
- Ideology: Liberalism; Conservative liberalism
- Political position: Centre-right
- Regional affiliation: Liberal Network for Latin America
- International affiliation: Liberal International(Juventud Evopoli is member of IFLRY)
- Chamber of Deputies: 2 / 155
- Senate: 2 / 50
- Regional boards: 12 / 302
- Mayors: 1 / 345
- Communal Councils: 61 / 2,252

Website
- www.evopoli.cl

Political Evolution (Spanish: Evolución Política), also known in Spanish by its shorthand Evópoli, is a Chilean centre-right political party, founded in 2012.

The party defined itself as a liberal platform for the people who look for a "modern centre-right who proposes as the central axis of their proposal the appreciation of diversity, the emphasis on encouraging local communities and the pursuit of social justice".

== History ==
Felipe Kast, Luciano Cruz-Coke, Harald Beyer and Juan Sebastián Montes founded the movement on 12 December 2012.

Evópoli agreed to participate in the primary parliamentary elections of National Renewal in 2013. Of the three candidates presented to the primaries, Eduardo Cuevas was the winner in the 19th district (Independencia and Recoleta). Evópoli participated in the parliamentary elections with five candidates for parliament, including Cuevas (district 19) and Felipe Kast (District 22). However, the senatorial candidacy of Luciano Cruz-Coke for the Antofagasta Region failed to materialize, as the Socialist Party challenged his candidacy on the Electoral Court (Tricel), considering that it was applicable the restriction on State ministers, which must resign at least a year before they could become parliamentary candidates. On 12 September, the Tricel annulled the candidacy of Cruz-Coke.

For the presidential election of that year, Evópoli supported the Alliance candidate, Evelyn Matthei. Kast joined her command in the second round. In the parliamentary elections of 2013, Felipe Kast was elected deputy for the district 22 (Santiago).

On 18 December of that year, 150 advisers joined its ranks, including ministers Pedro Pablo Errázuriz and Roberto Ampuero.

The 12 April 2014 General Council of Evópoli announced the decision to become a political party. On the same occasion María Francisca Correa was elected as president; Luciano Cruz-Coke, Pedro Pablo Errázuriz, Francisco Irarrázaval, Cecilia María Vasallo and Andrés Molina were elected vice presidents, and Jorge Saint Jean was appointed as secretary general. The founding charter of the party was signed on 21 March 2015, and the process of registration with the Electoral Service of Chile began.

Subsequently, on 24 July 2015, was published in the Official Gazette, the extract of the party constitution, which Evópoli fell into the category of "party in formation" and it should get the necessary notarized signatures required by law to be formally registered as a political party under Chilean law, for each region.

On 6 May 2018, Hernán Larraín Matte was elected president of the party, replacing Francisco Undurraga. Larraín the son of current Minister of Justice Hernán Larraín and brother of filmmaker Pablo Larraín.

In face of the April 2021 "mega-election" consisting of the 2021 Chilean Constitutional Convention election, the 2021 Chilean regional elections and the 2021 Chilean municipal elections, Evópoli was the party that borrowed the most from banks to finance its campaigns. This led The Clinic to label the party "the favourite of the banks".

Gloria Hutt was elected president of the party in October 2022. The election of Hutt and the loss of her rival Luciano Cruz-Coke was considered by Ex-Ante a blow against the founding group of the party including Felipe Kast. In political terms the victory of Hutt was interpreted as the triumph of liberalism over the more traditional right-wing approach of Cruz-Coke. Another change with Hutt was that the party would have a full-time leader instead of one that is an elected official. Ignacio Briones, a supporter of Hutt, did also perform well being elected party councilor with a plurality of votes in Santiago Metropolitan Region. Of the party's 17,700 registered members that were eligible to vote 1402 voted.

After obtaining poor results in the 2025 election, the party was dissolved in February 2026, as it failed to meet the legal requirements to maintain its registration. This decision was appealed to the Electoral Court, which accepted the appeal on 24 April 2026, thus maintaining its registration as a political party.

== Political position ==
Sociologists like Stéphanie Alenda have described to Evópoli as a postmaterial party, according the categories of the sociologist Seymour Martin Lipset.

Evópoli is a centre-right party that shows a variety of liberal tendencies, including classical liberalism, social liberalism, and conservative liberalism.

Evópoli is in favor of same-sex marriage, in contrast from other parties within the Chile Vamos coalition.

== Presidential candidates ==
The following is a list of the presidential candidates supported by Political Evolution.

- 2017 primaries: Felipe Kast (lost)
- 2017: Sebastián Piñera Echenique (won)
- 2021 primaries: Ignacio Briones (lost)
- 2021: Sebastián Sichel (lost)
- 2025: Evelyn Matthei (lost)

== Elections results ==
=== Congress elections ===
| Election year | Chamber of Deputies | | | Senate | | | Status |
| Election year | # Votes | % Votes | Seats | # Votes | % Votes | Seats | Status |
|---|---|---|---|---|---|---|---|
| 2017 | 255,221 | 4.26% | 6 / 155 | 67,801 | 4.07% | 2 / 50 | Government |
| 2021 | 221,284 | 3.50% | 4 / 155 | 368,024 | 7.90% | 3 / 50 | Opposition |
| 2025 | 280,261 | 1.61% | 2 / 155 | 11,253 | 0.36% | 2 / 50 | Government |
