= Felipe Kast =

Chilean economist, politician and consultant

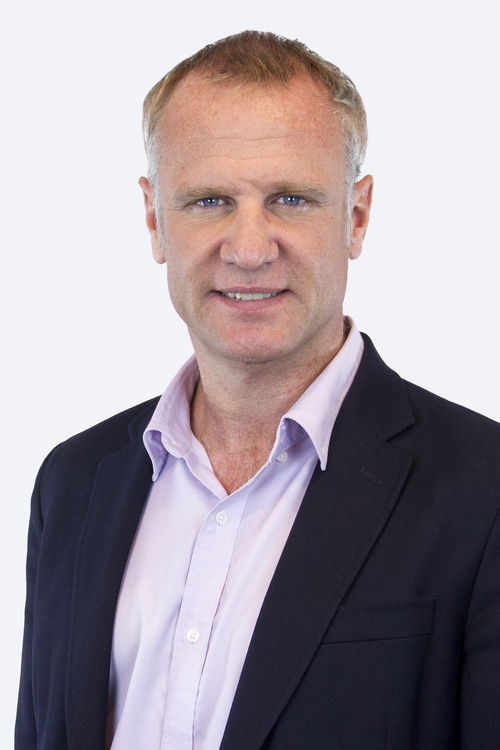
- Official portrait, 2022

Member of the Senate of Chile
- In office 11 March 2018 – 11 March 2026
- Preceded by: Creation of the charge
- Constituency: 11th Circunscription (Araucanía Region)

President of Evópoli
- In office 26 January 2015 – 6 November 2016
- Preceded by: María Francisca Correa
- Succeeded by: Jorge Saint-Jean

Member of the Chamber of Deputies of Chile
- In office 11 March 2014 – 11 March 2018
- Preceded by: Alberto Cardemil
- Succeeded by: Dissolution of the charge
- Constituency: 22nd District (Santiago Centro)

Minister of Planning
- In office 11 March 2010 – 13 October 2011
- Preceded by: Paula Quintana
- Succeeded by: Joaquín Lavín

Personal details
- Born: 9 June 1977 (age 49) Santiago, Chile
- Party: Evópoli (2012–present)
- Spouse: Emelia Puga (m. 2004; sep. 2022)
- Domestic partner: Pamela Díaz (2024–2026)
- Children: 4
- Parent(s): Miguel Kast Rist; Cecilia Christine Sommerhoff Hyde
- Relatives: José Antonio Kast (uncle); José Antonio Kast Adriasola (cousin); Javier Etcheberry (stepfather); Pablo and Tomás Kast (brothers); Michael Kast (grandfather); Robert Schumann (great-great-great-grandfather); Clara Schumann (great-great-great-grandmother)
- Education: Pontifical Catholic University of Chile (B.Sc, M.Sc); Harvard Kennedy School (PhD)
- Occupation: Politician
- Profession: Economist

Felipe José Kast Sommerhoff (born 9 June 1977) is a Chilean economist, researcher, consultant, and politician who has served as parliamentary and minister in his country. He is the nephew of President José Antonio Kast.

A graduate in economics from the Pontifical Catholic University of Chile with a PhD from Harvard University, Kast has been Minister of Planning, presidential candidate in the 2017 primary elections and deputy for the commune of Santiago between 2014 and 2018. He currently serves as senator for the Araucanía Region after being elected to an eight-year term in the 2017 parliamentary elections.

Kast actively participated in President Sebastián Piñera's first government, first as Minister of State and then as Presidential Delegate for emergency camps and villages occupied by 27 February 2010 Earthquake victims.

Kast is a founder and former president of Evópoli, a conservative-liberal and centre-right party. In what was described as a blow to Kast Gloria Hutt was elected president of the party in October 2022 rather than Kast's candidate Luciano Cruz-Coke.

== Biography ==
=== Family and early life ===
Kast was born in Santiago on 9 June 1977. He is the son of Miguel Kast, who served as Minister of ODEPLAN (1978), Minister of Labor (1980), and President of the Central Bank of Chile (1982) during the military regime of General Augusto Pinochet; and Cecilia Sommerhoff.

He is the brother of Pablo Kast, former Deputy for the 6th District of the Valparaíso Region (2018–2022); Tomás Kast, Deputy for the 23rd District of the Araucanía Region (2026–2030); and Bárbara Kast, councilor of the commune of Paine (2012–2021).

He is the father of three children: Miguel, Emelia, and Pedro.

=== Professional career ===
Kast graduated from Colegio Verbo Divino in Santiago in 1995. He studied Commercial Engineering at the Pontifical Catholic University of Chile. During his studies, he collaborated with the university’s Pastoral Directorate and participated in the “Áncora” project, aimed at providing primary health services in low-income communities.

In 1999, he completed an academic exchange at the University of Havana in Cuba, where he studied Economics and Sociology. He returned to Chile in 2000 to complete his degree, later earning a Master’s degree in Economics with a specialization in Public Policy from the same university.

In 2004, he traveled to the United States to pursue a PhD in Public Policy at Harvard University, where he received the “Inequality and Social Policy Multidisciplinary Program” scholarship. During this period, he worked as a social policy consultant for the World Bank and the Center for International Development at Harvard University. He also participated in the Abdul Latif Jameel Poverty Action Lab (J-PAL), developed by the Massachusetts Institute of Technology and the Pontifical Catholic University of Chile.

He later served as a professor at the Institute of Economics of the PUC.

In August 2009, he joined the Libertad y Desarrollo (LyD) Institute as a researcher and director of the Social Policy Area, where he created the “Public Ideas Center,” dedicated to organizing seminars and working commissions on social issues.

=== Political career ===
In 2009, Kast actively participated in the presidential campaign of Sebastián Piñera. Following the earthquake of 27 February 2010, President Piñera appointed him as General Coordinator of the “Levantemos Chile” campaign, responsible for coordinating public policies to address the effects of the disaster.

On 11 March 2010, he was appointed Minister of Planning by Piñera, serving until 18 July 2011.

On 4 August 2011, President Piñera appointed him as Presidential Delegate for Emergency Villages and Camps, created in response to the 27 February 2010 earthquake. He resigned from this position at the end of 2012 to dedicate himself to Political Evolution (Evópoli), a political movement he helped found. On 21 March 2015, he was elected president of the party.

On 2 July 2017, he ran as a presidential pre-candidate in the Chile Vamos primary elections, obtaining 218,682 votes, equivalent to 14% of the coalition’s total.

Following the primaries, he ran for the Senate in the 2017 general election, representing Evópoli in the 11th Senatorial District of the Araucanía Region. He won the seat with a plurality of 63,605 votes, equivalent to 18.83% of the valid votes.

From 5 May 2018 until August 2020, he served as Vice President of Evópoli. On 16 January 2021, he announced his decision not to compete in the Chile Vamos presidential primaries.

== Awards and recognition ==
In 2005, Kast was recognized as one of the 100 Young Leaders by the Leaders Network, Revista El Sábado of El Mercurio, and Adolfo Ibáñez University.
