= Miguel Kast =

Chilean economist (1948–1983)

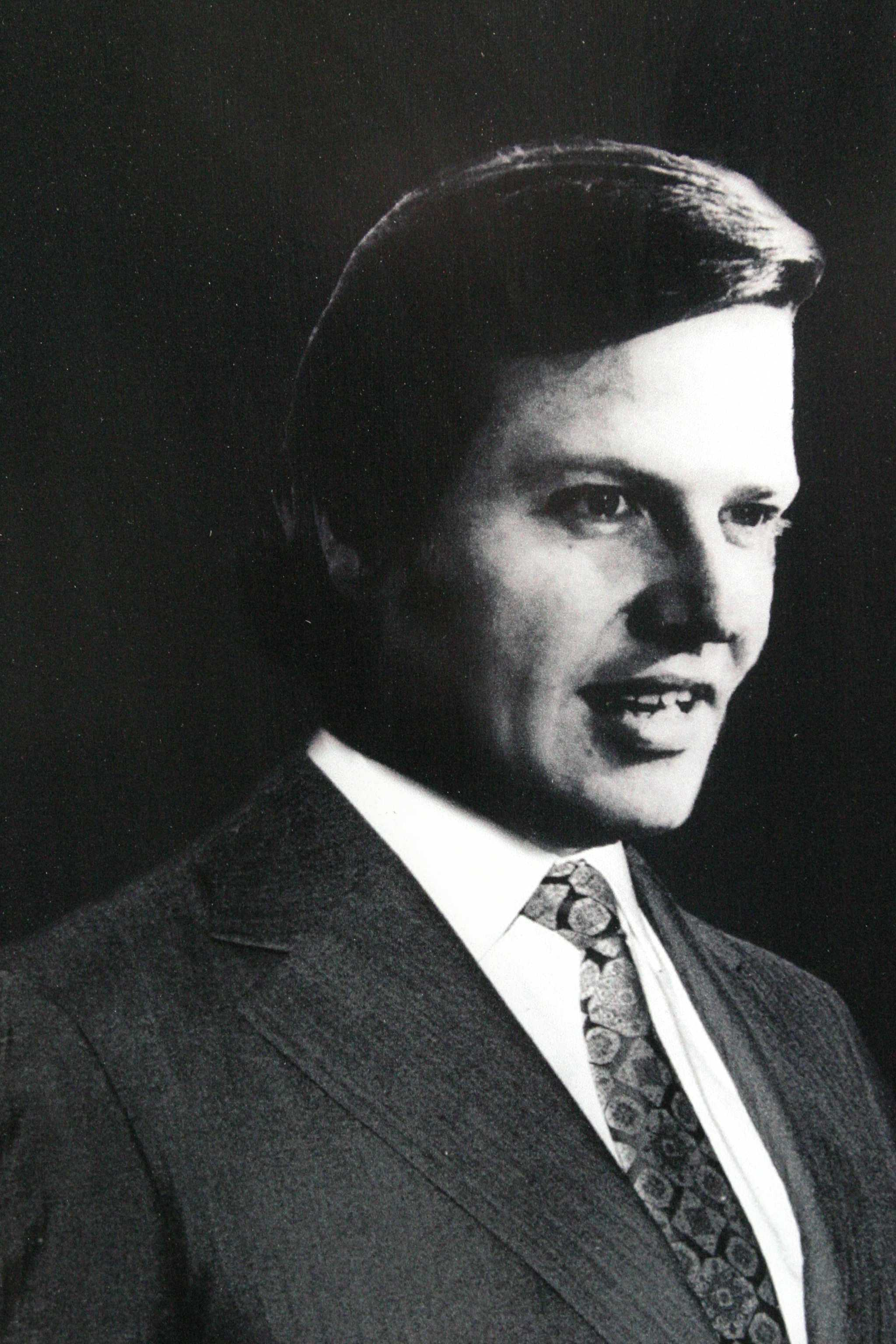
- Kast in 1982

President of the Central Bank of Chile
- In office 23 April 1982 – 2 September 1982
- President: Augusto Pinochet
- Preceded by: Sergio de la Cuadra
- Succeeded by: Carlos Cáceres Contreras

Minister of Labor
- In office 29 December 1980 – 22 April 1982
- President: Augusto Pinochet
- Preceded by: José Piñera
- Succeeded by: Máximo Silva Bafalluy

Head Minister of the National Office of Planification
- In office 26 December 1978 – 29 December 1980
- President: Augusto Pinochet
- Preceded by: Roberto Kelly Vásquez
- Succeeded by: Álvaro Donoso Barros

Personal details
- Born: 18 December 1948 Oberstaufen, Germany
- Died: 18 September 1983 (aged 34) Santiago, Chile
- Party: Christian Democratic Party (1960s); FJUN (1981–1983)
- Spouse: Cecilia Sommerhoff
- Children: Michael; Pablo; Felipe; Tomás; Bárbara
- Relatives: Michael Kast (father); José Antonio Kast (brother); Bárbara Kast (sister)
- Education: Pontifical Catholic University of Chile (BA); University of Chicago (MA)
- Occupation: Economist • Politician

Academic background
- Influences: Milton Friedman

Academic work
- School or tradition: Chicago School (Chicago Boys)

Michael Kast Rist (German pronunciation: [ˈmɪçaʔeːl kast]; 18 December 1948 – 18 September 1983), commonly known as Miguel Kast, was a German-born, naturalised Chilean, economist of the Chicago Boys group. He served as Minister of State and President of the Central Bank under the dictatorship of Augusto Pinochet. In his youth, he was a member of the Christian Democratic Party.

== Early life ==
Kast was born to Michael Kast, a German lieutenant and Nazi who fled to Chile from Germany in 1950 after escaping American custody, and Olga Rist, whom his father had met in Bavaria while on the run.

== Political career ==
Upon getting his master's degree in economics at the University of Chicago, Kast joined Odeplan (1973), the state agency that led many public policy and economic changes after 1973. At Odeplan, Kast focused most of his energies on creating the "map of extreme poverty", which would become the cornerstone of Chile's social development programs. In 1978 he became the head of Odeplan and used his position to involve young professionals in the struggle against poverty by making them join Odeplan and by sending them to the country's outer regions to get insight into the real problems affecting Chile.

In 1980, Kast became Labor Minister under the military dictatorship of Augusto Pinochet. In April 1982, aged 33, he became President of the Central Bank of Chile. This was a complicated moment in Chile's economy; the exchange rate was fixed at 39 pesos per dollar and Chile's large economic groups had liabilities with their own banks. As a central banker, he worked to reduce the level of related loans, which were loans made to the owners of the banks. He created a mechanism called the "Portfolio Sale" through which the Central Bank could buy high risk credits to commercial banks. By keeping a fixed exchange rate of 39 pesos per dollar, Kast hoped to protect local companies that had liabilities in dollars. However, the central authority saw otherwise. On 13 June 1982, the peso was devalued, which created a loss of international reserves. Kast decided in August 1982 to completely free the exchange rate, further devaluing the peso and bringing new intervention from the central authority. Under this new threat of instability, Kast resigned from the Central Bank on 2 September.

Kast left government life in late 1982 and dedicated himself to the business world and his professorship at Chile's Pontifical Catholic University. Around this time, he began to feel unwell, developing signs of physical weakness and a pale appearance. In January 1983 he was diagnosed with bone cancer, which claimed his life on 18 September 1983. He was 34 years old.

== Family ==
Kast's sons, Felipe and Pablo Kast, as well as Kast's younger brother, José Antonio, are all active in political life. José Antonio was elected to the presidency in 2025. His sister Bárbara is a Servant of God.
