= Prisoners of the 2019–2021 Chilean protests =

People imprisoned since the 2019–2021 Chilean protests

The prisoners of the 2019–2021 Chilean protests, dubbed by some groups as Prisoners of the Revolt (Spanish: Presos de la Revuelta), are people who have been held in custody in the context of the social unrest in Chile whose circumstances of detention have been subject of severe criticism including the claim they are political prisoners. A movement supported by representatives of the Congress of Chile and the Constitutional Convention calls for their release. The Government of Chile and Human Rights Watch reject the notion there would be political prisoners in Chile.

== Nature of the detainees ==
Deputy Tomás Hirsch has stated that Chile "is breaching international human rights treaties by having excessively long preventive detentions". Deputy Maite Orsini has exemplified this with two young men who spent 431 and 457 days in preventive detention only to be condemned for minor offences that did not result in prison sentences. In another case a man spent 14 months in preventive prison, purportedly for carrying a stone and a molotov cocktail, before charges were dropped. Matías Fuentes a 22-year old former engineering student was in preventive for 13 months before charges were dropped. United Nations has criticized Chile for its excessive use of preventive detention and the discrepancies that exists regarding the number of people in preventive detention associated to the 2019-2020 protests.

In December 2020 Deputy Claudia Mix numbered the Prisoners of the Revolt at "more than 2500 unfinished processes and over 600 in jail". In early June 2021 the Supreme Court of Chile declared it would launch a probe into the conditions of the detainees following a petition of Senator Pedro Araya. Araya has cautioned against a general pardon since it would also benefit those who used a "just cause" to carry out looting and arson.

According to news site Ex-Ante among the Prisoners of the Revolt are people accused or condemned for making and throwing Molotov cocktails including one thrown at Chilean police, theft of a pickup truck, arson attempt at a shoe shop and looting of a Líder hypermarket.

Various of the detainees are young men with a history of high school dropout.

=== Political prisoners ===
While several organisations and individuals in Chile hold they are political prisoners Human Rights Watch Director José Miguel Vivanco have asserted in December 2020 that "there are no political prisoners in Chile". Citing the European Parliament's resolution 1900 (The definition of political prisoner, 2012) University of Chile law professor Claudio Nash Rojas states however that there is evidence there are political prisoners and that this is independent of the real or presumed crimes and offences committed by the prisoners. Some members of Primera Línea have according to Claudio Nash Rojas been subject to political prison as they were put into preventive prison and declared "danger to society" (Spanish: peligro para la sociedad) without a case-by-case analysis. Chilean court's indiscriminate use of the highest level of precautionary measure (Spanish: medida cautelar) –that is preventive prison– to members of Primera Línea is to be understood according to Claudio Nash Rojas as a political measure.

== Release attempts ==
The demand for the release of the Prisoners of the Revolt is supported by left-wing groups such as the Broad Front, the Communist Party of Chile and The List of the People.

In December 2020 Chilean MPs proposed a law project to pardon the Prisoners of the Revolt. Among the supporters were Camila Vallejo, Tomás Hirsch, Adriana Muñoz, Isabel Allende, Yasna Provoste, Juan Ignacio Latorre and Alejandro Navarro. The move was supported also by the presidential candidate Daniel Jadue, who called President Sebastián Piñera to release the Prisoners of the Revolt.

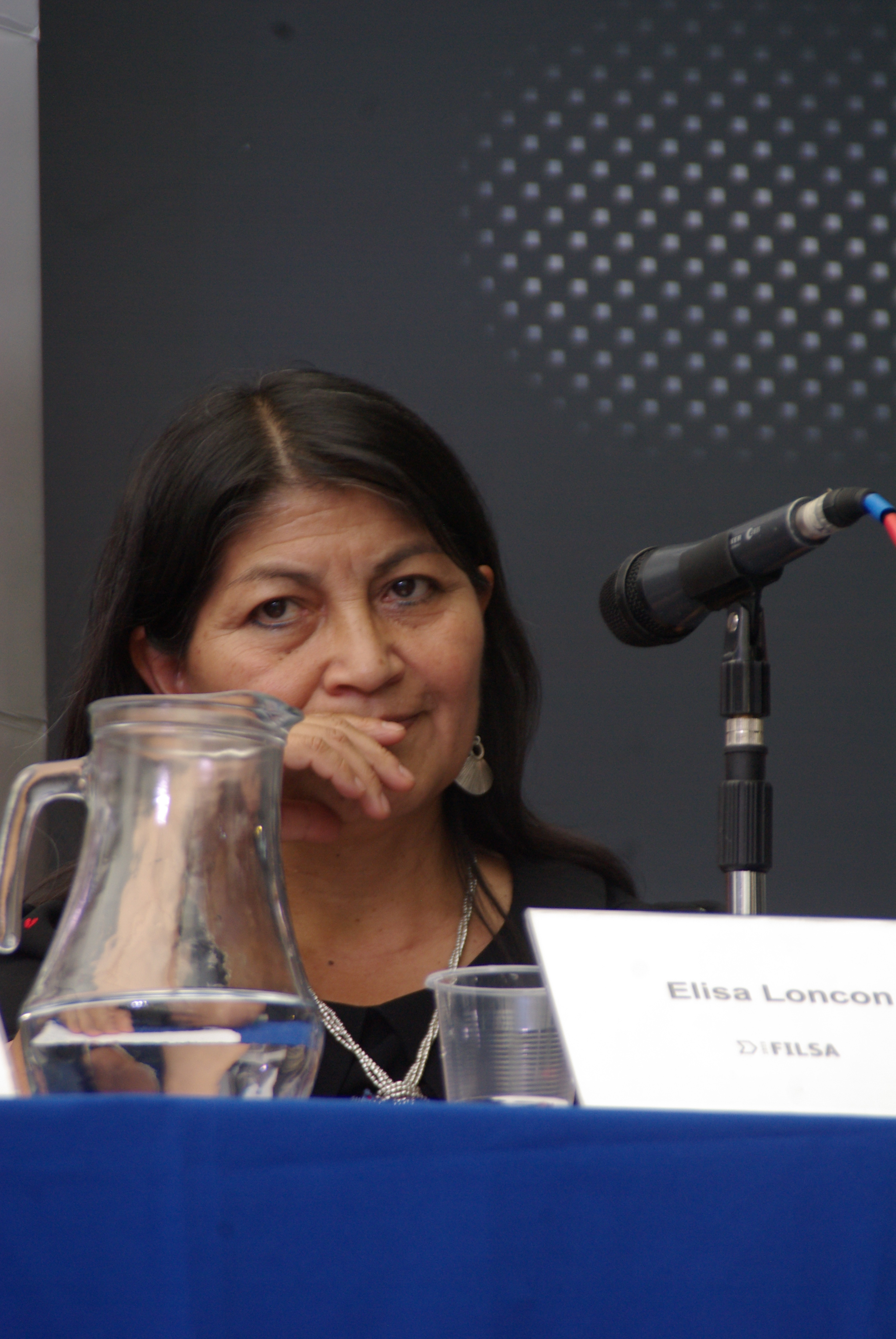
President of the Constitutional Convention Elisa Loncón has declared her aim to make a petition for the release of Prisoners of the Revolt.

María Rivera has defended detainees in court and has been a driving force behind the release attempts as a member of the Constitutional Convention. Shortly after being elected President and Vice-President of the Constitutional Convention, Elisa Loncón and Jaime Bassa declared their aim to discuss a formal petition for the release of the prisoners. Loncón also mentioned her aim to provide amnesty to indigenous "political prisoners" of the Mapuche conflict.

In one of its first agreements after being formed, the Constitutional Convention published a statement on 7 July 2021 for the release of the "political prisoners" of the protests and the Mapuche conflict, calling the Congress to approve the proposed law for pardon and amnesty. The statement was supported by 105 out of 155 members, being rejected mainly by the right-wing members from Chile Vamos.

== Government response ==
The Government of Chile has rejected the notion that political prisoners would exist in Chile. In his traditional May 21 speech of 2021 President Sebastián Piñera echoed Vivanco's view by refuting the existence of political prisoners in Chile. Writing in Rebelion.org pundit Igor Mora notes in relation to this that no government in the world has ever recognised the existence of political prisoners in its jurisdiction. Minister of Justice and Human Rights Hernán Larraín has acknowledged that preventive prison is used in a wrongful way in Chile. Larraín has also recognised the situations of distress caused by slow processes, claiming part of the reason is that many investigated crimes occurred in situations that are not clear-cut and take time to clarify. Larraín has as of November 2020 declined to interfere with the Judiciary of Chile in this matter.
