= Estallido social =

Demonstrations and riots in Chile (2019–2020)

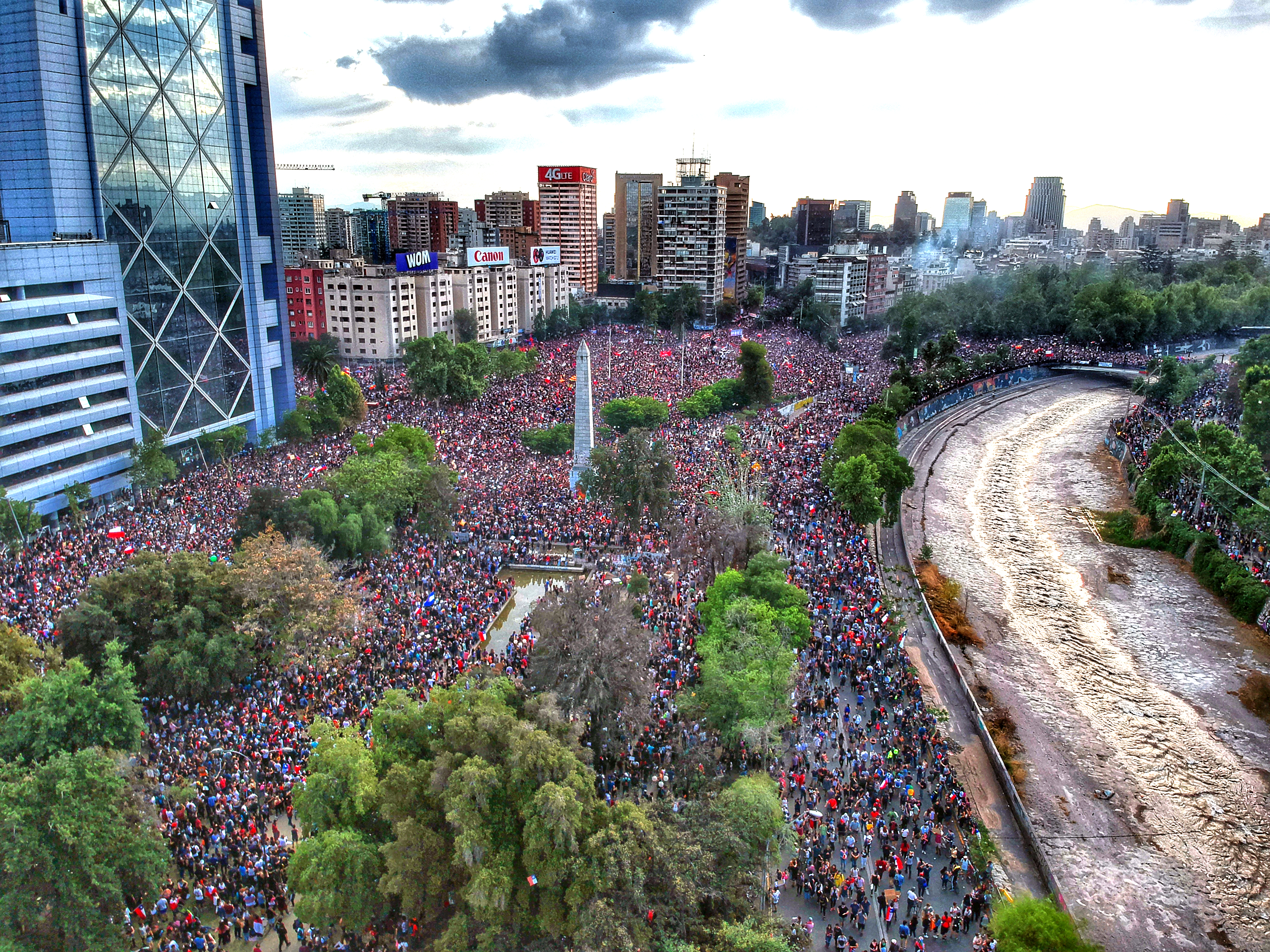
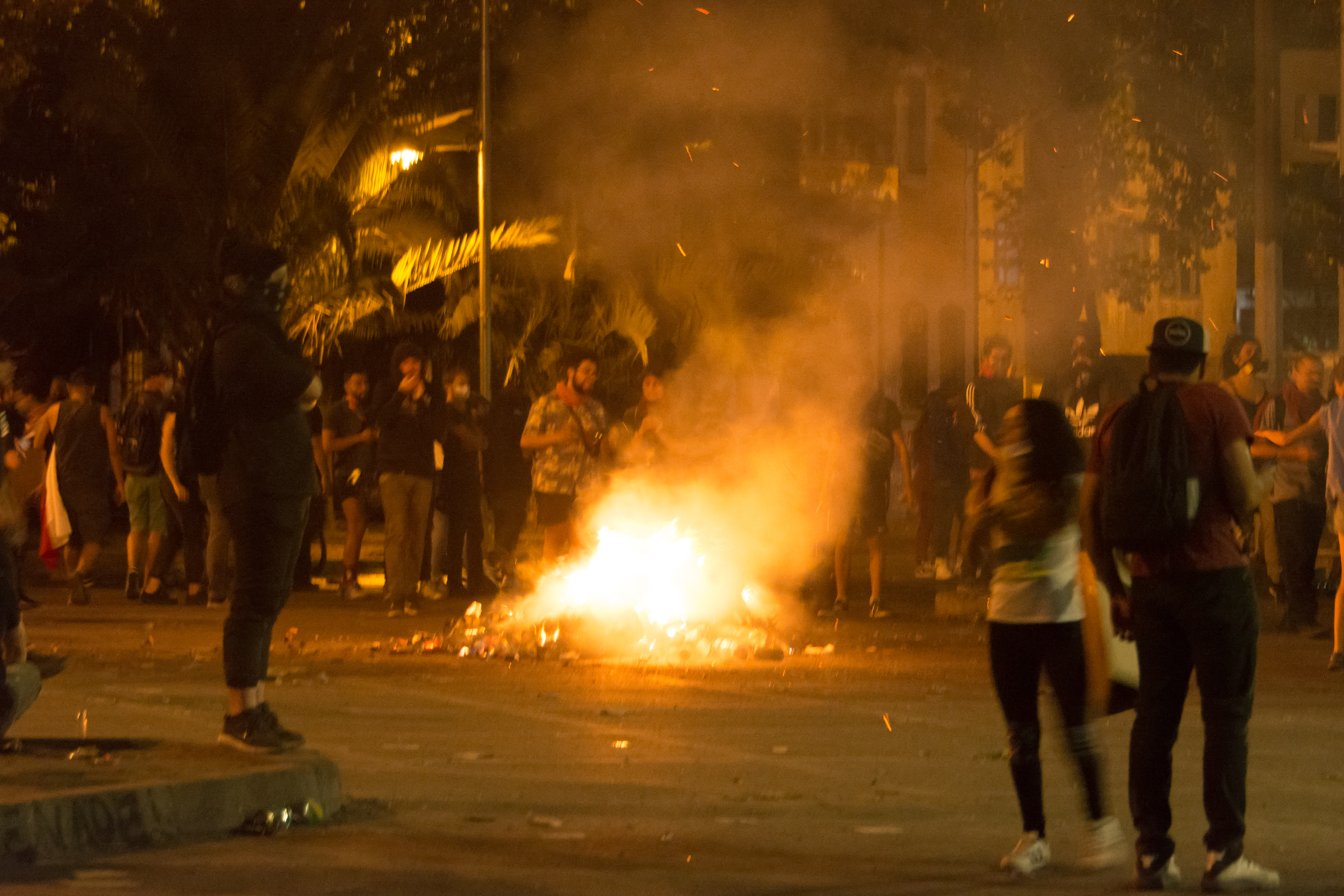
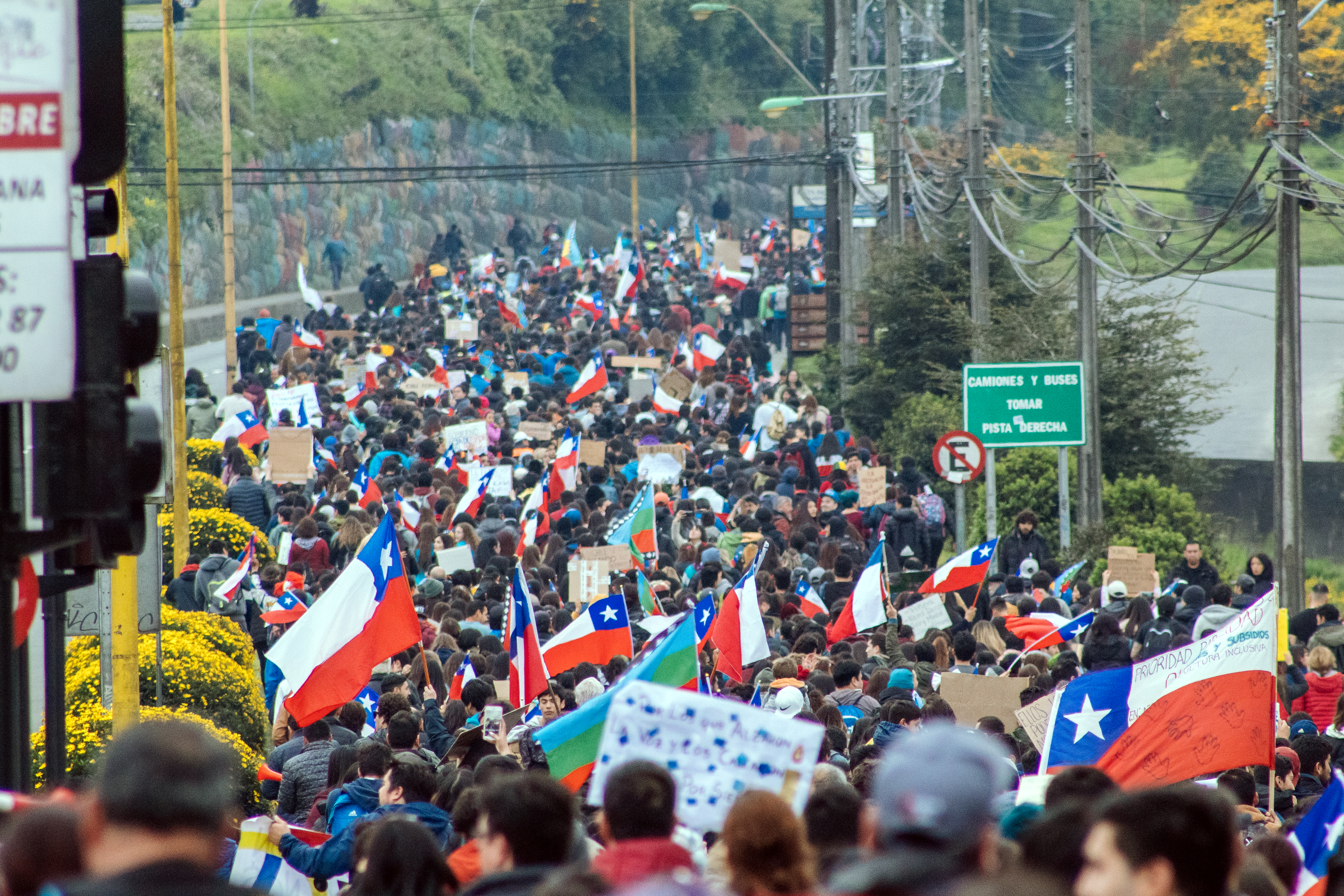
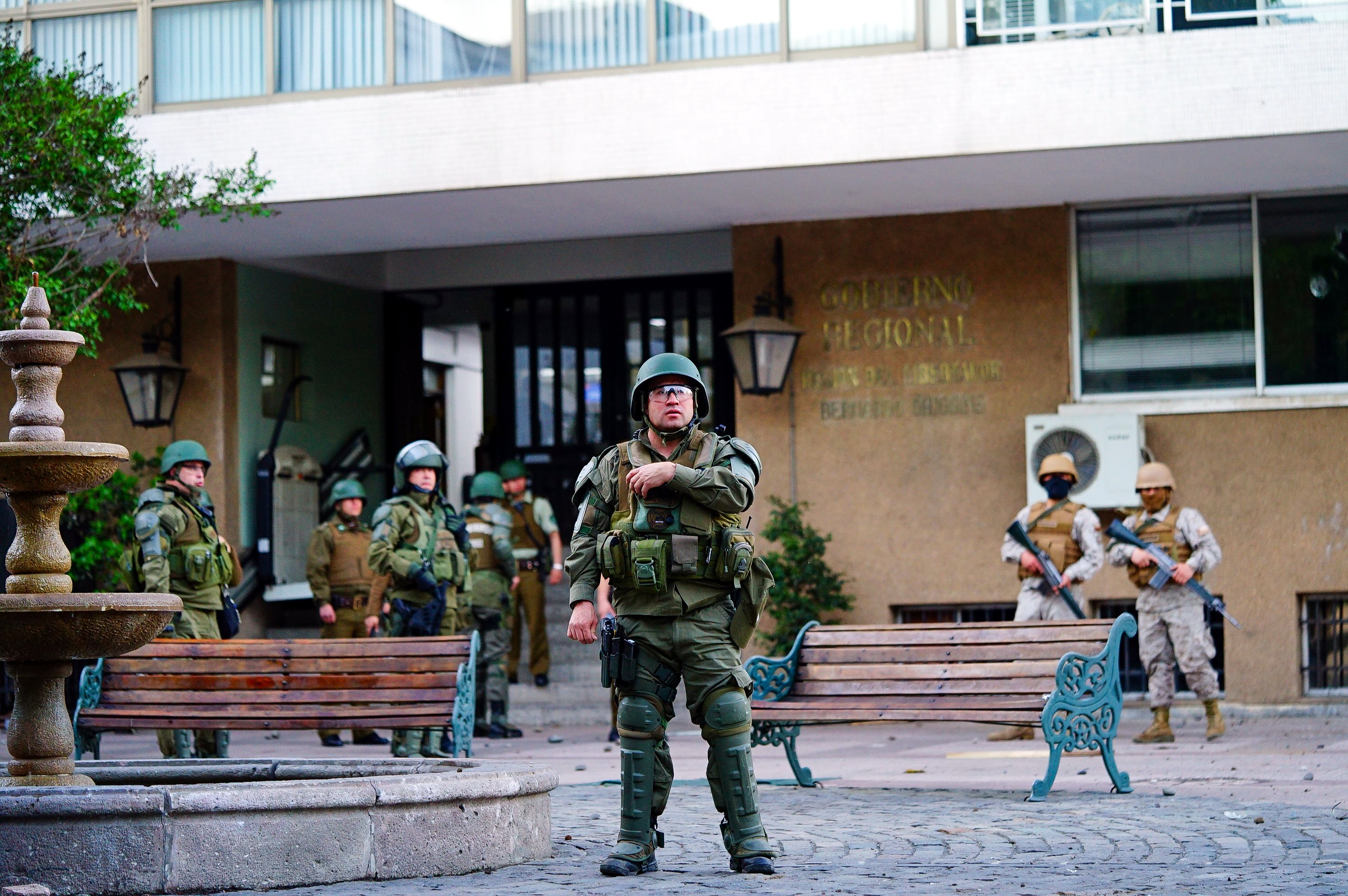
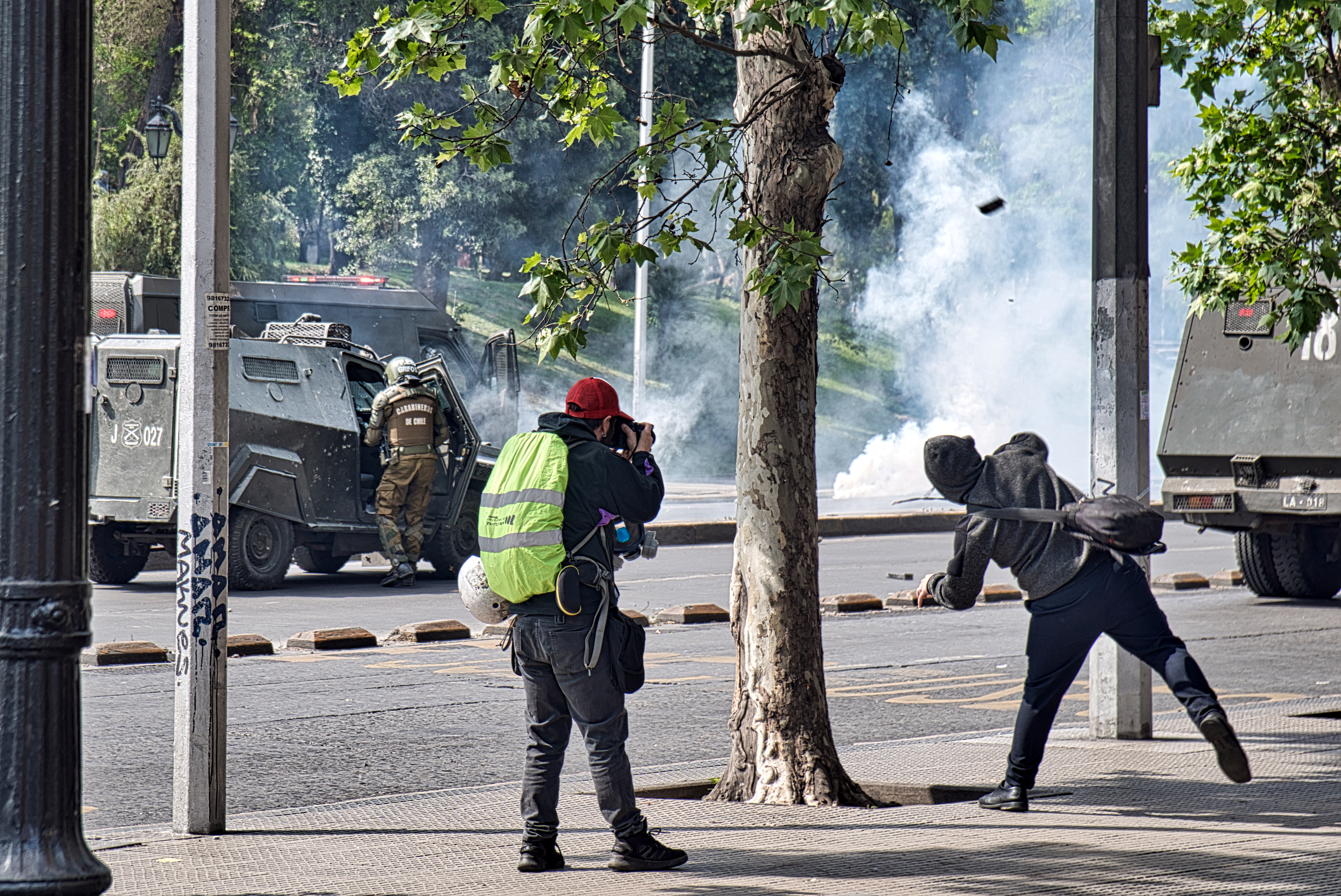
- Protests in various Chilean cities, most notably Santiago.
- Date: 7 October 2019 – 18 March 2020 (5 months, 1 week and 4 days)
- Location: Chile
- Caused by: Rise in public transport fares; Probity crisis, cost of living, privatisation, and social inequality
- Goals: Reversal of public transport fares; Reforms in education, health care, and pension systems; Better wages and minimum wage increase; Resignation of President Sebastián Piñera; Draft a new constitution
- Methods: Demonstrations; Internet activism; Student activism; Fare evasion; Civil disobedience; Riots; Lootings
- Result: Closure of the Santiago Metro on the weekend of 19–20 October; State of emergency and curfew declared on 16 regions of Chile
- Concessions: President Sebastian Piñera announces new reforms in education, healthcare, and pension systems; Cabinet reshuffle, including Interior, Finance and Economy ministries; 2020 Chilean national plebiscite

Parties
Protesters; Primera Línea; Anarchists; Mesa de Unidad Social; Workers' United Center of Chile; No+AFP; Mapuche groups; Others groups: Confederation of Chilean Students; Feminist movements; Garra Blanca; Los de Abajo; Supported by: Communist Party of Chile; Broad Front	Government of Chile; Chilean Armed Forces; Chilean Army; Carabineros de Chile; Grupo de Operaciones Policiales Especiales; Investigations Police of Chile; Chile Vamos; Independent Democratic Union; National Renewal; Political Evolution; Democratic Independent Regionalist Party; Counter-protesters: Yellow vests protesters

Lead figures
No centralized leadership	Sebastián Piñera (Chile) Andrés Chadwick (Chile) Gonzalo Blumel (Chile) Javier Iturriaga (Chile) Alberto Espina (Chile) Mario Desbordes (Chile) Mario Rozas (Chile) Ricardo Yáñez (Chile) Víctor Pérez (Chile) Karla Rubilar (Chile) Felipe Guevara (Chile) Felipe Alessandri (Chile) Evelyn Matthei (Chile) Rodrigo Delgado

Number
Over 3.7 million protesters	

Casualties
- Deaths: 36 (as of February 2020)
- Injuries: 11,564
- Detained: 28,000 (as of February 2020)

The estallido social (English: Social outburst) was a series of massive demonstrations and severe riots occurring mainly between October 2019 and March 2020, in response to a rise in fares on the Santiago Metro, a probity crisis, (Note: According to political scientist Mauricio Morales Quiroga, the probity crisis stemmed from a series of publicized cases of corruption among the police, the armed forces and government, besides a series of private company collusions. A 2019 study by Transparency International claimed that 54% of adult Chileans thought corruption had increased the last year.) cost of living, university graduate unemployment, (Note: Various Chilean intellectuals such as José Joaquín Brunner and Mario Waissbluth have posited that growing numbers of university graduates with bleak prospects of professional development and employment contributed to the protests.) privatisation, and inequality prevalent in the country. It originated in Santiago and took place in all regions of Chile, with greater effect in the regional capitals.

The protests began in Chile's capital, Santiago, as a coordinated fare evasion campaign by secondary school students which led to spontaneous takeovers of the city's main train stations and open confrontations with the Carabineros de Chile (the national gendarmerie). On 18 October, the situation escalated as a group of people began vandalizing Santiago's infrastructure; seizing, vandalizing, and burning down many stations of the Santiago Metro network and disabling them with extensive infrastructure damage; and for a time causing the closure of the network in its entirety. Eighty-one stations sustained major damage, including seventeen burned down. On the same day, president of Chile Sebastián Piñera announced a state of emergency, authorizing the deployment of Army forces across the main regions to enforce order and prevent the destruction of public property, and invoked before the courts the Ley de Seguridad del Estado ("State Security Law") against dozens of detainees. A curfew was declared on 19 October in the Greater Santiago area.

In the following days, protests and riots expanded to other Chilean cities, including Concepción, San Antonio, and Valparaíso. Widespread looting occurred at shops and businesses. The state of emergency was extended to the Concepción Province, all of Valparaíso Region (except Easter Island and Juan Fernández Archipelago), and the cities of Antofagasta, Coquimbo, Iquique, La Serena, Rancagua, Valdivia, Osorno, and Puerto Montt. The protests have been considered the "worst civil unrest" having occurred in Chile since the end of Augusto Pinochet's military dictatorship due to the scale of damage to public infrastructure, the number of protesters, and the measures taken by the government.

On 25 October 2019, over 1.2 million people took to the streets of Santiago to protest against social inequality in what was called "the biggest march of Chile". By 28 December 2019, 29 people had died, nearly 2,500 had been injured, and 2,840 had been arrested. Human rights organizations received several reports of violations conducted against protesters by security forces, including eye mutilation, torture, sexual abuse, and sexual assault. On 28 October 2019, President Piñera changed eight ministries of his cabinet in response to the unrest and dismissed his Interior Minister Andrés Chadwick.

On 15 November 2019, the National Congress signed an agreement to hold a national referendum that would rewrite the constitution if it were to be approved. On 25 October 2020, Chileans voted 78.28 percent in favor of a new constitution, while 21.72 per cent rejected the change. Voter turnout was 51 percent. On 16 May 2021, a vote was held resulting in the election of the 155 Chileans who formed the convention which drafted the new constitution. On November 18, Chilean security services discontinued an investigation as to the presumed involvement of Cuban and Venezuelan agents in the protests, having found no conclusive evidence.

The scale of the protests was ultimately diminished with the emergence of COVID-19, which prompted the implementation of social distancing measures and government-imposed lockdowns. An estimated 3.5 billion dollars and 300,000 jobs were lost due to the destruction and damage to public and private infrastructure, including the Santiago Metro, as a result of the protests and vandalism carried out mainly between October and November 2019. During the second half of 2020 and most of 2021, the demonstrations continued almost exclusively around Plaza Baquedano, where every Friday between 100 and 500 people confronted the police and vandalized the surroundings, demanding the liberation of the so-called "Prisoners of the Revolt". This conduct was labeled by the government as "acts of crime that do not respond to a demonstration or social demand".

On 19 December 2021, a former student leader and constitutional agreement negotiator, 35-year old leftist Gabriel Boric, was elected president in the 2021 presidential election with 55.86% of the vote. Under his government, on 4 September 2022, the 2022 Chilean national plebiscite was held in order to determine whether the public agreed with the text of a new Political Constitution of the Republic drawn up by the Constitutional Convention. The proposed constitution was rejected by a margin of 62% to 38%, leaving the constitutional process open, and effectively putting an end to what had become known as octubrismo ("Octoberism").

== Core issues ==
=== Transport fares ===
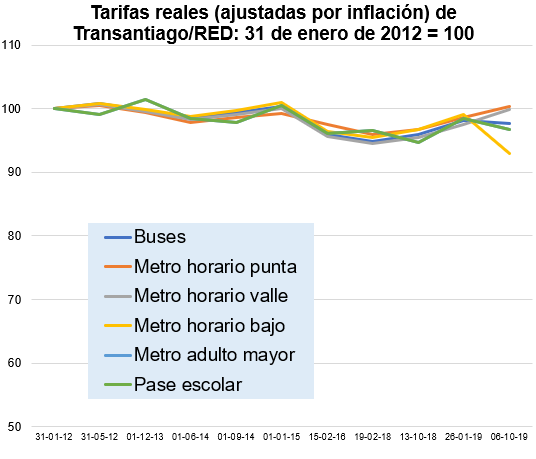
Fee, adjusted by inflation, of public transportation in Santiago, between 31 January 2012 and 6 October 2019, before the last increase was revoked

The price of public transport in Greater Santiago is determined by the Panel of Public Transport Experts (Spanish: Panel de Expertos del Transporte Público), which uses an automatic calculation formula to adjust fares on a monthly basis. The Ministry of Transportation and Telecommunications is advised by the panel and must be notified of any price changes.

On 1 October 2019, the panel determined the quarterly adjustment of fares for the public transport system of the Province of Santiago and the communes of San Bernardo and Puente Alto. They decided that a fare hike of 10 Chilean pesos for buses and 30 pesos for the Santiago Metro and Metrotrén at peak hours (a rise of about 4%), as well as a fare decrease of 30 pesos at off-peak hours, was necessary. The increase was justified by the panel due to increase of the rate index, which is subject to variations in the value of fuel, the value of the US dollar, the value of the euro, the cost of labor, and the consumer price index among other variables, such that the costs to the subway have risen. The fare change was scheduled to take effect from 6 October.

Some specialists, such as former Minister Paola Tapia, have indicated that there are other factors that explain the rise. Among these factors would be the purchase without tender of a new fleet of electric buses for the Metropolitan Mobility Network and the suspension of the new tender for bus services, both decisions made by the administration of Minister Gloria Hutt.

In addition, there is criticism that rail transit fares in Santiago are the second highest in Latin America (only surpassed by São Paulo). In relative terms, the average monthly cost per person for the city's public transport is equivalent to 13.8% of the minimum wage, well above other cities such as Buenos Aires, Mexico City or Lima, where it does not exceed 10%.

=== Inequality and cost of living ===
According to José Miguel Ahumada, a political economist and associate professor at the University of Chile, the country is "one of the most unequal countries in Latin America". As described by The Washington Post, while the last three decades of neoliberal policies made Chile "one of South America's wealthiest countries, with inflation under control and easy access to credit", they also "created stark economic disparities and strapped many Chileans into debt". (Note: Analysis of historical data shows that Chile has been very unequal society since at least 1850.) The Economic Commission for Latin America and the Caribbean (ECLAC) states that 1% of the population in Chile controls 26.5% of the country's wealth, while 50% of low-income households access 2.1%. Additionally, according to the National Statistics Institute, while the minimum wage in Chile is 301,000 pesos, half of the workers in that country receive a salary equal to or less than 400,000 pesos.

Protesters interviewed by Reuters said they were struggling to make ends meet because of the high costs of part-privatised education and health systems, rents and utilities, and a privatised pension system has been widely rejected by Chileans because of its low and often delayed payouts.

== October 2019 protests ==
October protests

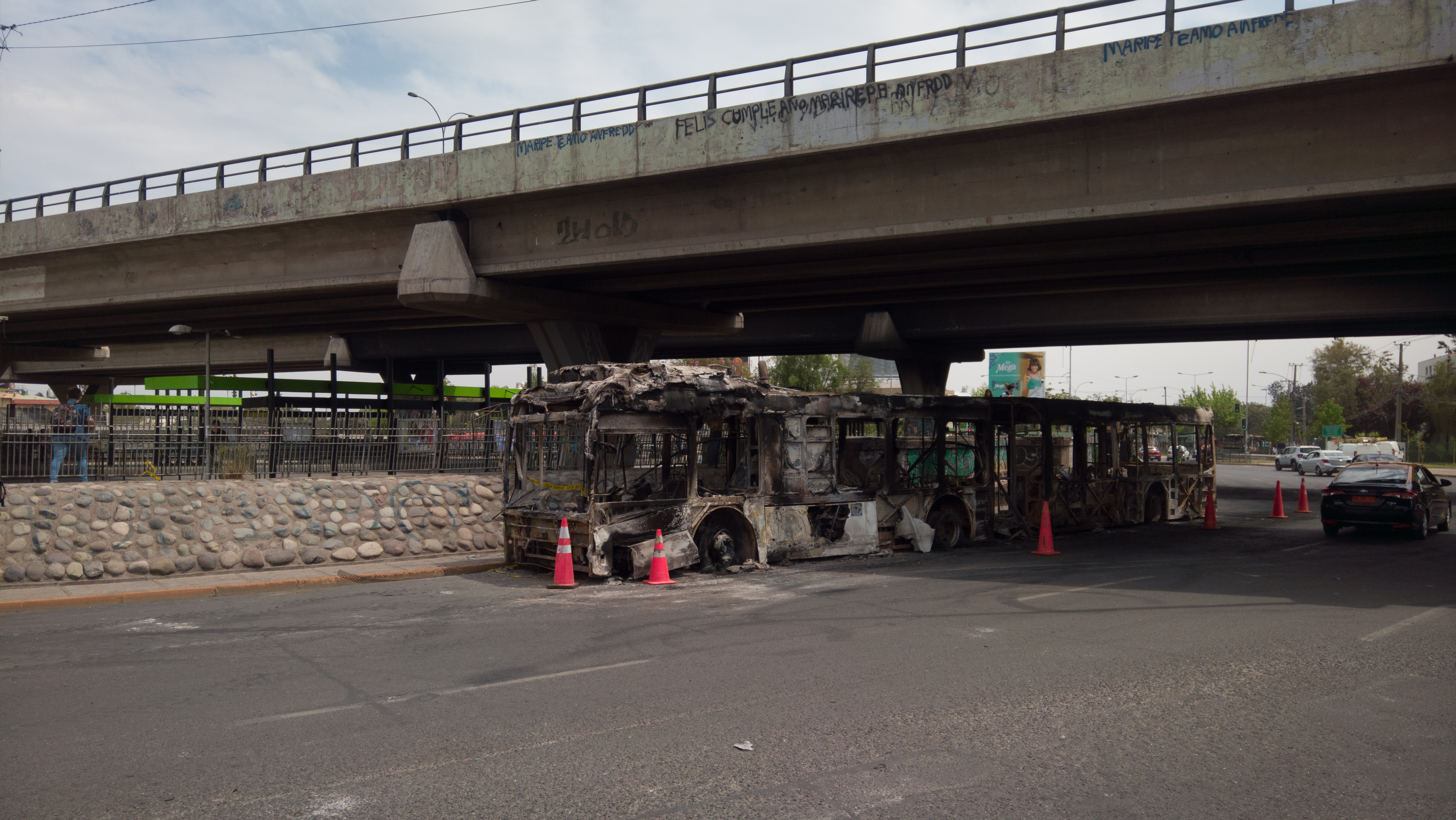
One of the 16 public transport buses that were burned on the night of 18 October

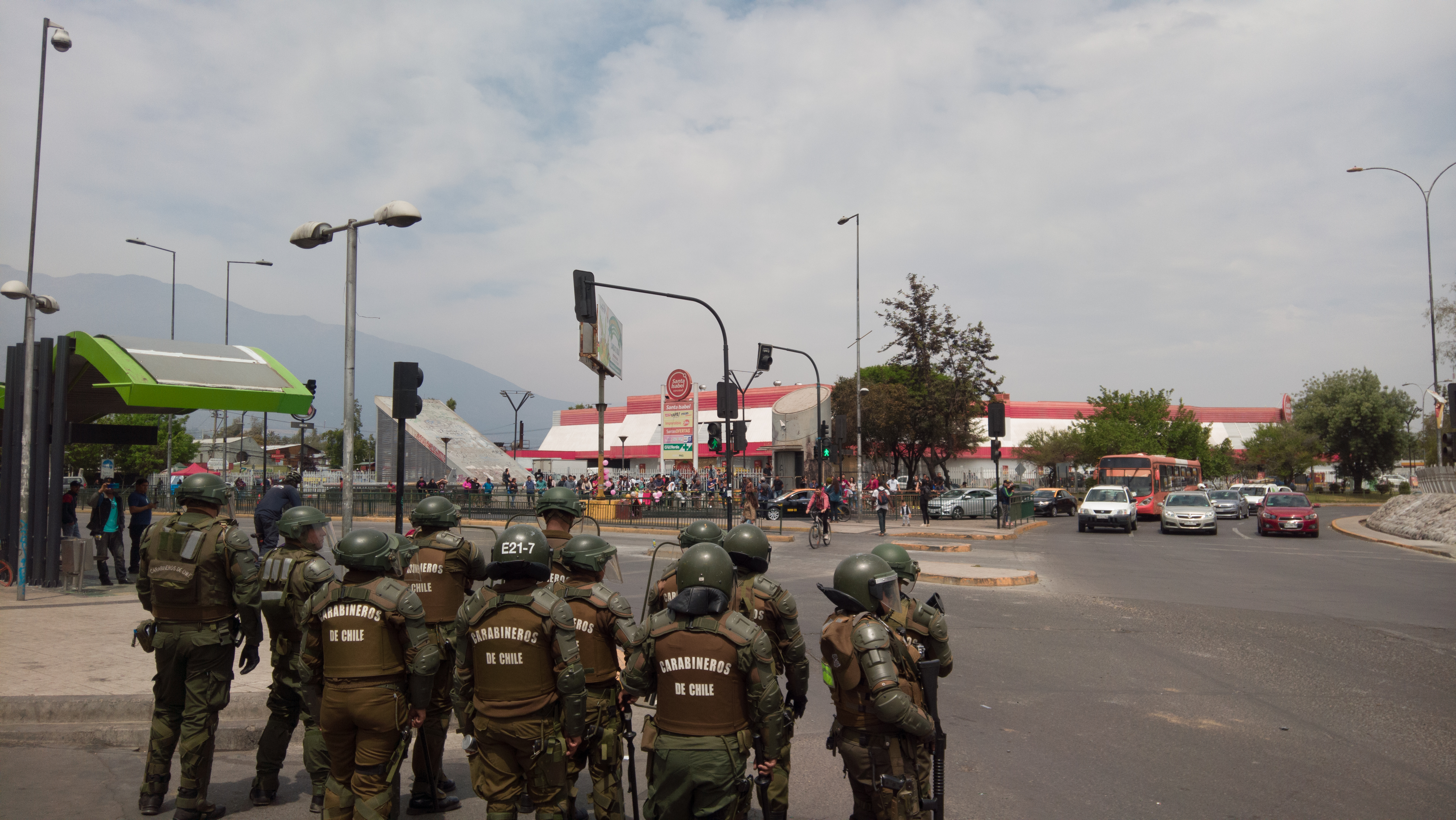
Carabineros Public Order Control officers watching protests on 19 October

The protests against the rise in public transportation costs in Santiago, Chile, were marked by a series of mass fare evasions initiated by students from prominent high schools in downtown Santiago, including Liceo n.º 1 Javiera Carrera, Instituto Nacional General José Miguel Carrera, and Internado Nacional Barros Arana.Under the slogan ¡Evade! ("evade"), the fare-dodging campaign continued and grew over the remainder of that week and into the next. Regarding the fees Minister of Economy Juan Andrés Fontaine commented on October 8 that "those who get up early can be helped with a lower rate" causing outrage in the public opinion. The first of these acts of fare evasion took place at the Universidad de Chile metro station on Monday, 7 October, and continued daily at various nearby stations, leading to a significant response from the Metro authorities. The Santiago Metro implemented controlled access at several stations in coordination with the 60th police station of Carabineros de Chile, situated within the Baquedano metro station, and filed a complaint with the North Central Prosecutor's Office in an effort to contain the protests.

In the second week of protests, the acts of fare evasion by school students were recorded at various stations of the metro network, spreading rapidly on social media and leading to an increase in stations with controlled access. By Tuesday, 15 October, Metro lines 1, 3, and 5 faced interruptions in their service due to the high number of protesters.

The National Intelligence Agency had issued a warning on 8 October, suggesting an increase in security measures as actions beyond fare evasion were anticipated between 8 and 11 October, hinting at political support for these actions.

As the days passed, the demonstrations continued to grow, involving not only students but other groups as well. On the morning of Wednesday, 16 October, serious incidents occurred inside and outside Santa Ana station between protesters and special forces of the Carabineros. The situation deteriorated further in the afternoon, with a notable incident where hundreds of passengers knocked down the access gate to Plaza de Armas station, which was closed to prevent fare evasions.

Despite the growing acceptance of the protests, they were minimized and criminalized by government authorities and other experts, including the former president of the Metro, Clemente Pérez, who dismissed the protests as "senseless" and "rather foolish".

The protests escalated further on Thursday, 17 October, with more violent clashes occurring at metro stations. The closure of certain stations was compounded by a water main break on Avenida Providencia, worsening transportation issues during peak hours. San Joaquín station saw the destruction of fare validators for the Tarjeta bip!, while stations like San Miguel, Chile España, and Estación Central were closed with no train stops. The Metro estimated the damage at approximately 500 million pesos, around 700,000 US dollars.

On Friday, 18 October, the situation escalated as protests unfolded in downtown Santiago. Barricades were built, to which the police responded with water cannons and tear gas. The entire Metro system was closed after attacks were reported at nearly all its 164 stations, forcing many passengers to walk home. The headquarters of electricity company Enel Generación Chile was damaged in a fire which affected its emergency exit stairwell. Multiple subway stations were burned in Santiago as well as infrastructure throughout the country, severely damaging businesses and public infrastructure.

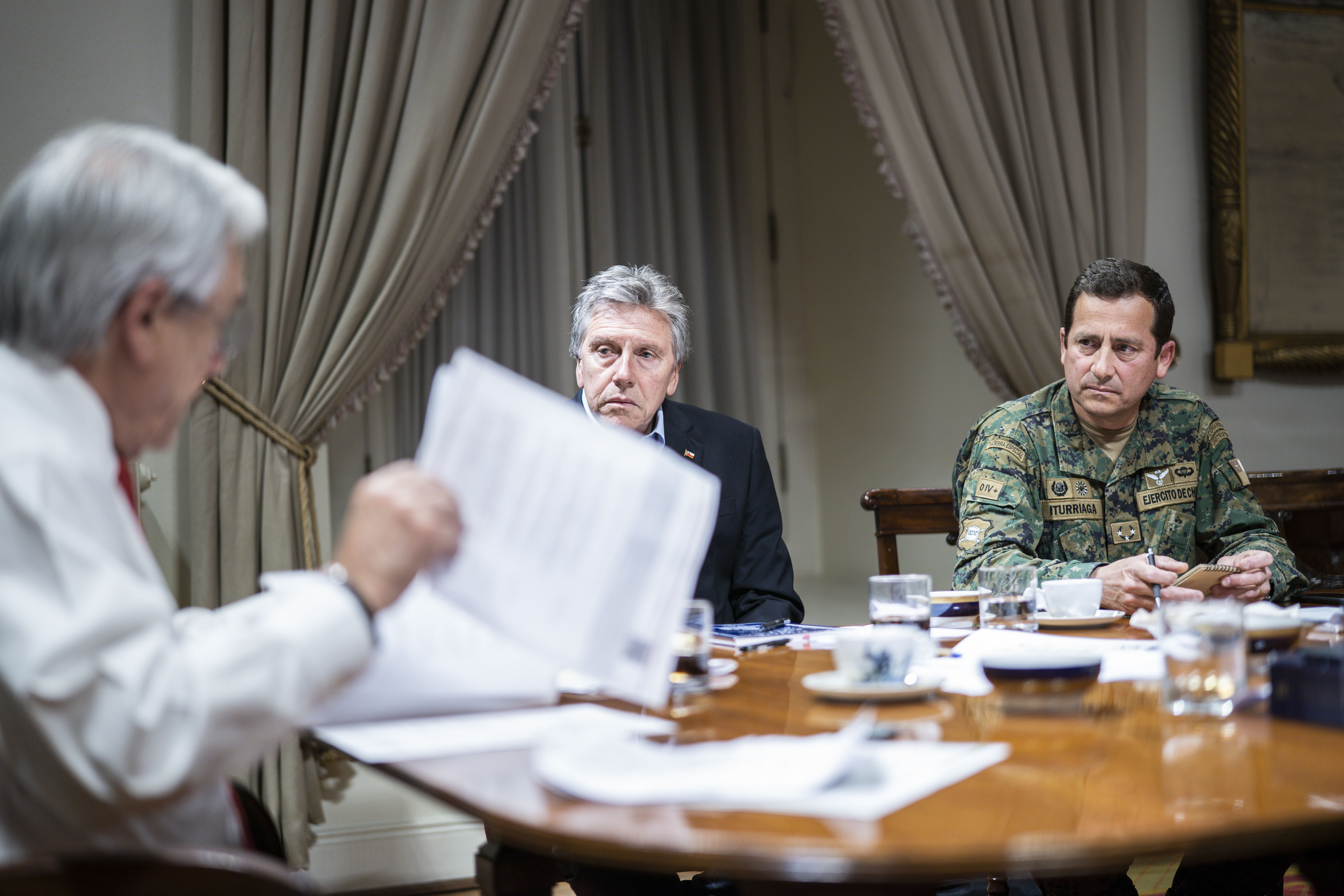
President Piñera with Minister Alberto Espina and the head of National Defense for the Metropolitan Region Javier Iturriaga del Campo.

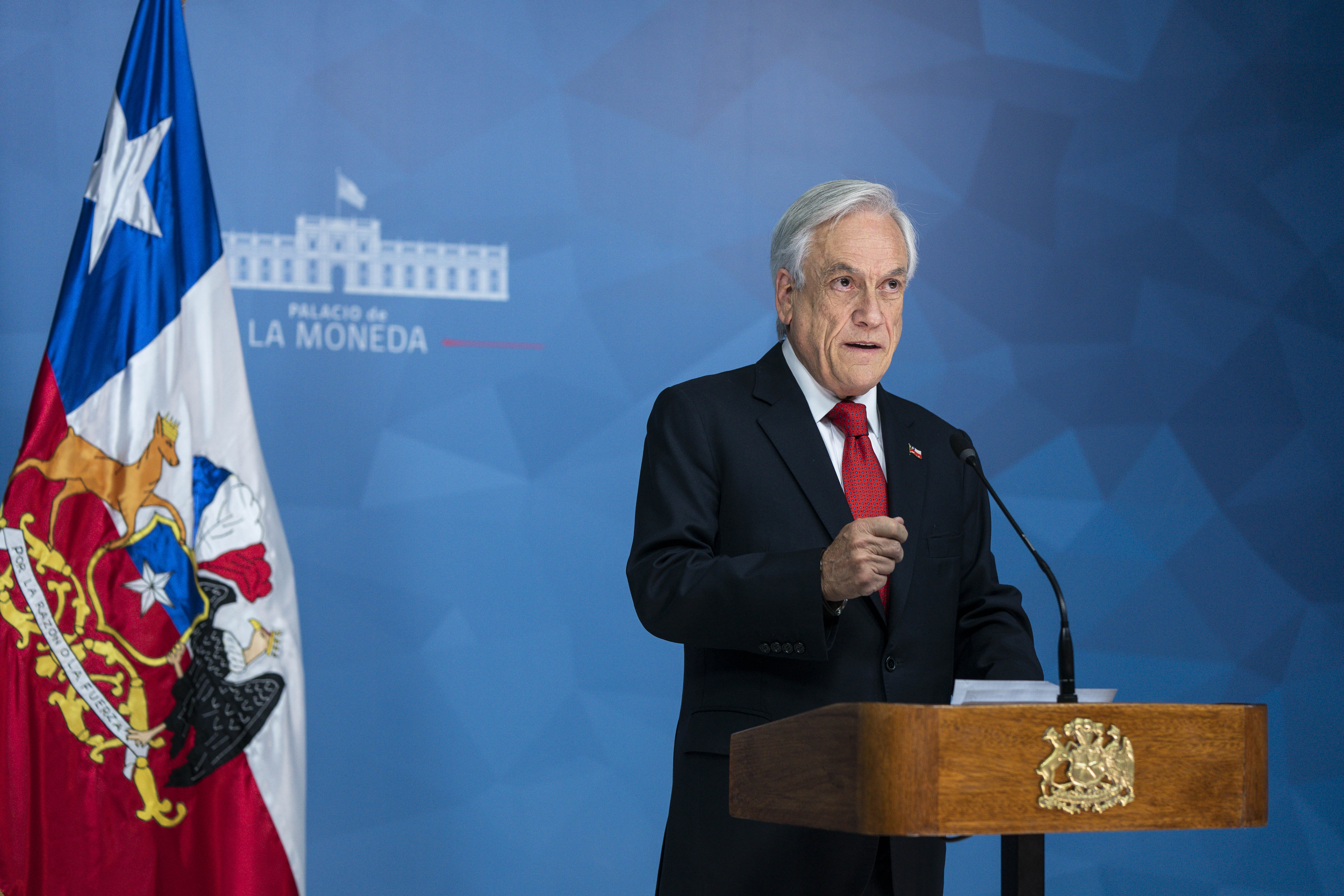
Piñera decreeing a State of Emergency during the political crisis in October 2019.

During the late hours of the day, a photograph circulated on social media showing the President away from La Moneda Palace, attending the birthday of one of his grandchildren. The celebration took place at a restaurant named Romaría, an expensive pizza parlour in the northern district of Vitacura, one of Santiago's wealthiest. Government authorities confirmed the situation, explaining that it was a brief stop while the president was returning to La Moneda to address the crisis. However, the image became an iconic moment, symbolizing the disconnection between the president and his administration and the reality faced by people suffering from the high cost of living and the chaos caused by the protests. Piñera later addressed the nation and announced a 15-day state of emergency in the capital, allowing the armed forces to patrol the city alongside the Carabineros, Chile's militarized national police force.

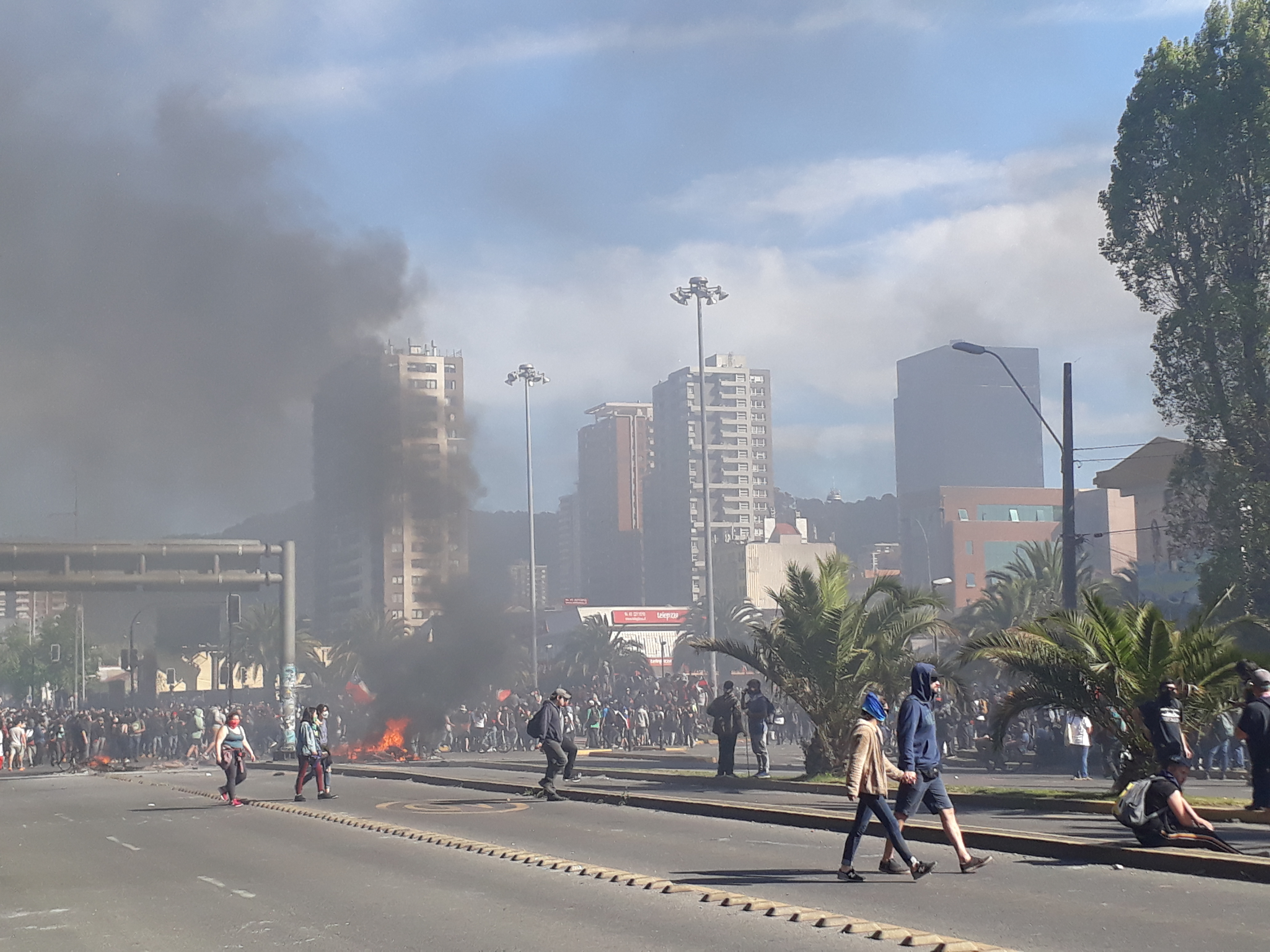
Demonstration and barricades in downtown Concepción on 21 October

The violence continued on 19 October and the Metro remained closed to passengers. Shops were looted, buses were set alight and clashes occurred between demonstrators and the security forces. A curfew was imposed between 22:00 and 07:00 hours. As rioting spread to other parts of the country, states of emergency were declared in the Valparaíso Region and Concepción Province. In an address to the nation in the evening, President Piñera announced the cancellation of the fare increase and the establishment of a dialogue panel, with representatives from across society, to discuss the underlying causes behind the unrest.

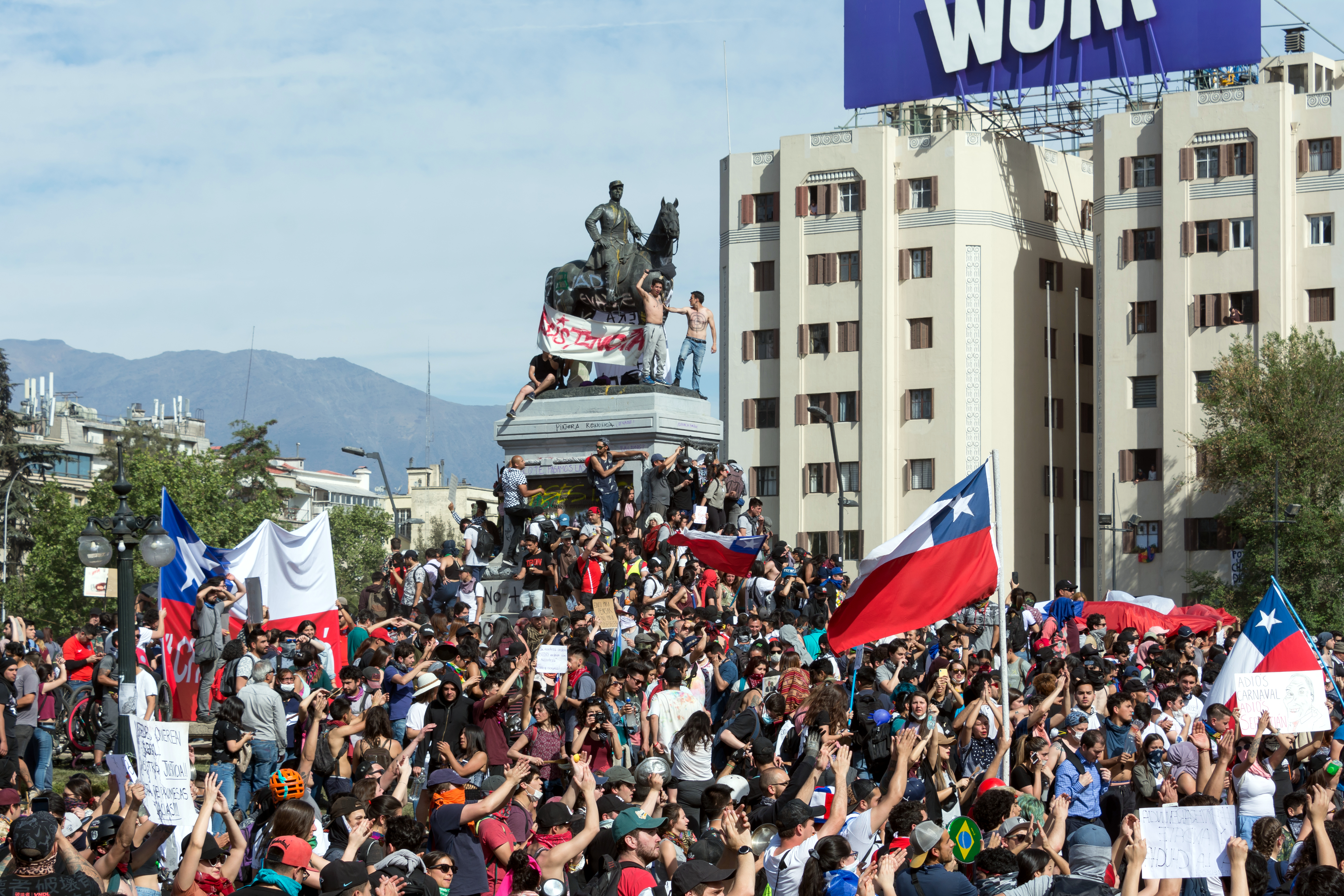
Protesters in Plaza Baquedano on 22 October

On 20 October, many supermarkets, shopping malls and cinemas remained closed as the protests continued. Curfews were imposed for that night in the Santiago Metropolitan Region, and the regions of Valparaíso, Biobío (including the regional capital, Concepción), and Coquimbo; as the curfew began in Santiago, many protesters remained on the street.

Local authorities also announced the closure of schools on 21 October (and some also on 22 October) in 43 of the 52 communes of the Metropolitan Region and across the province of Concepción.

President Piñera again addressed the nation on the evening of 20 October. In his remarks, he said the country was "at war with a powerful and relentless enemy" and announced that the state of emergency, already in effect in the Metropolitan Region and the regions of Valparaíso, Biobío, Coquimbo and O'Higgins, would be extended to the regions of Antofagasta, Maule, Los Ríos, and Magallanes. Some opposition politicians described his rhetoric as "irresponsible", while a Latin America editor for BBC News Online expressed concern about the influence his words would have on the protesters and on the chances for meaningful dialogue. Hours shortly after the President's speech, chief of national defense, General Javier Iturriaga del Campo, spoke against this declaration, asserting that he was "content" and "not at war with anyone".

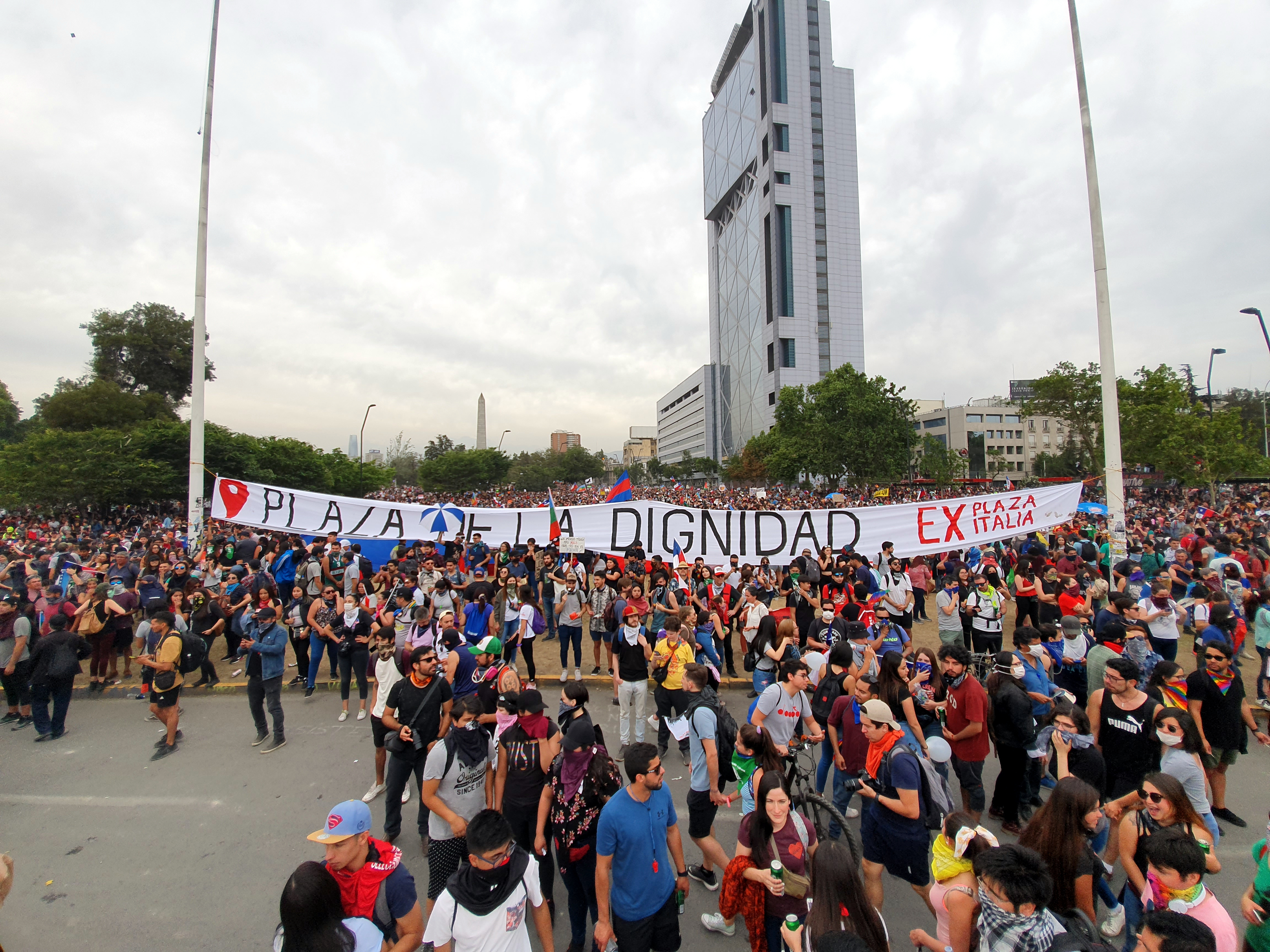
Protesters in Plaza Baquedano on 8 November

Some incidents of unrest were reported on 21 October in Santiago, Concepción, and other cities. The Santiago Metro remained closed, except for a portion of Line 1, as did all the nation's universities and institutes of higher education. The intendant of the Metropolitan Region announced that schools would remain closed on 22 October in 48 of the region's communes. Michelle Bachelet, a former president then serving as the United Nations High Commissioner for Human Rights, issued a call for open, sincere and immediate dialogue and warned that "the use of inflammatory rhetoric will only serve to further aggravate the situation".

On 25 October, over a million people took to the streets in Santiago, and thousands more throughout Chile, to protest against President Piñera, demanding his resignation.

By 26 October 2019 19 people had died, nearly 2,500 were injured, and 2,840 arrested.

On 26 October, President Piñera requested all of his cabinet ministers to resign; however, he accepted 8 resignations, including the Interior Minister Andrés Chadwick. Three days later, Piñera withdrew Chile from hosting the APEC Economic Leaders' Meeting scheduled for November and the United Nations Climate Change Conference in December.

According to Bloomberg, the protests are the worst civil unrest having occurred in Chile since the end of Augusto Pinochet's military dictatorship due to of the scale of damage to public infrastructure, the number of protesters, and the measures taken by the government.

On 8 November, approximately 75,000 people took to the streets of Santiago to take part in anti-government protests. During the protests, a Roman Catholic church in Santiago was looted and its religious iconography was burned in the street. A university near Santiago's Plaza Italia square was burned as well.

== History ==
=== Attempts for normalization and the "New Social Agenda" ===
Monday, 21 October, was the first business day after the big riots. The government insisted on working towards normalcy, by encouraging the return to work and school. The Secretary of Labor Nicolás Monckeberg rejected the idea to declare a holiday, despite the fact that he told businesses to give employees more flexible hours due to transportation issues. As for schools, the government gave municipalities the freedom to decide if they would hold classes. In the metropolitan region of Santiago, 43 of the 52 communes suspended activities, in addition to a large number of private institutions. They were joined by the majority of universities and institutions of higher education. Despite the fears of a possible shortage of food and fuel among citizens, due to the closure of shops, this did not occur, even though some people waited in long lines and others started hoarding.

The Santiago Metro partially restarted activity on Monday the 21st, opening certain Line 1 stations with a reduced schedule. In the days following, they increased the number of available stations. Beginning on the 28th, five of the seven lines opened and 53 stations opened (out of a total of 136). In spite of that, low metro capacities, temporary closures of some stations, and traffic diversions due to the demonstrations created long transportation delays for citizens of Santiago, especially in the more peripheral sectors. Additionally, the use of bicycles increased because of long delays on public transportation.

After five days of massive demonstrations, President Sebastián Piñera returned on the night of 22 October to address the country. During this speech, Piñera asked for forgiveness for not recognizing the issues that troubled society and announced a series of steps called the "New Social Agenda". These measures incorporate a series of small and moderate changes that will address different areas of need:

- Pensions: 20% increase in the Basic Solidarity Pension and the Provisional Solidarity Contribution; additional increases in 2021 and 2022 for retirees over the age of 75; fiscal contributions to complement Social Security savings of the middle class and women; contributions of fiscal resources to improve pensions for older adults who are not eligible.
- Health: Fix the government's catastrophic disease insurance project; create a project for medication; expand the agreement from Fansa with pharmacies to reduce the price of medication.
- Wages: Complement, with fiscal funds, the salary of workers until they reach a minimum guaranteed income of 350,000 Bruto (298,800 pesos) for full-time work; for the workers that receive the minimum salary, this is an increase of 49,000 pesos.
- Energy: Creation of a stable mechanism for electric tariffs, that voids the 9.2% rise expected in the coming months.
- Taxes: Creation of a new plan in the supplementary global tax of 40% for incomes over eight million pesos per month.
- Public administration: Reduction in the allowance of parliament and high salaries of the public administration; reduction of the number of members in the parliament and limits on their re-election.

Even though some politicians value concrete proposals, many critique the proposals as insufficient given the scale of the protests, even from the ruling party. Within the opposition, they critique the fact that some of the proposals subsidize or favor private businesses, being only superficial changes.

=== "The Biggest March" ===
After the announcement of the "New Social Agenda", the demonstrations continued and included some new actors. On 24 October a group of truck drivers, taxi drivers and other drivers – organized in the group "no more tolling" – held a protest along Route 68 towards the headquarters of the National Congress in Valparaiso The following day, the group held new demonstrations occupying various urban highways in Santiago as a way about the high cost of electronic tolling.

On Friday the 25th, massive marches were organized in different cities of the country. In the capital of the country, the principal announcement was made in Plaza Baquedano. "The biggest march of them all", as it was called, had an attendance that officially exceeded 1.2 million people becoming the largest recognized in Chile. This exceeded the demonstrations organized by the "No" campaign for plebiscites in 1988. The demonstration, due to its size, covered a large part of Alameda, the main avenue of the city, Forestal Park, Bustamente Park, Balmaceda Park, and other spaces. On that same afternoon, there was a march between Valparaíso and Viña del Mar with an attendance of more than 90,000 people, while in Concepción it reached 50,000 people. During the day there were multiple massive marches in other cities in Chile, between them Rancagua, La Serena, Coquimbo, Concepción, Arica and Punta Arenas, among others.

After the protests, various governmental figures expressed their support of the demonstrations through social media. President Sebastián Piñera referred to the massive march as "transversal" and "without political colors", even though the demands of the protestors include the resignation of the government and himself.

The massive, happy, and calm march today, where the Chileans asked for a more just and supportive Chile, opens grand paths of future and hope. We all have listened to the message. We all have changed. With unity and help from God, we will walk the road to that better Chile for all.

— Sebastián Piñera, President of Chile (Twitter)

On 27 October, the "largest march in the history of the Fifth Region" took place, proceeding along Avenida España from Viña del Mar to the National Congress Building in Valparaíso, with a record attendance of 200,000.

=== The "Agreement for Peace" ===
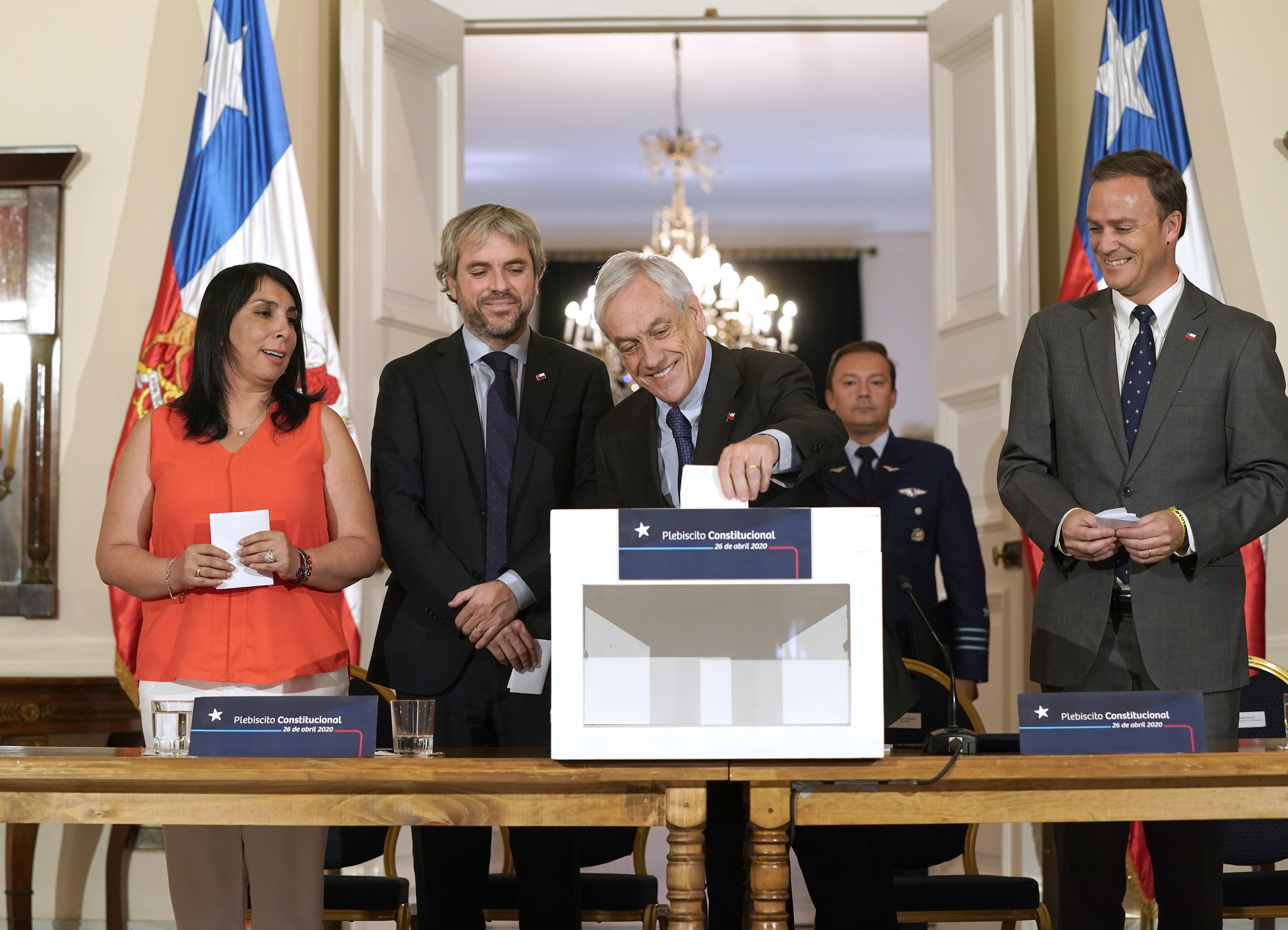
President Piñera summons the Constitutional Plebiscite of 2020.

During this crisis, the president promoted the "Agreement for Peace" that made possible the constitutional plebiscite of 2020 and other reforms to end institutionally and democratically the crisis, not by the use of force.

On 13 and 14 November, the Chile Vamos parties, led by President Piñera, and part of the opposition – excluding the CCP, the PRO, the FRVS, the PH and CS – held a series of negotiations in the building of the former National Congress to determine the beginning of a constituent process and its implementation mechanism. Negotiations came to fruition in the early hours of 15 November, announcing the completion of the plebiscite through a declaration called Agreement for Social Peace and the New Constitution.

== 2020 protests ==
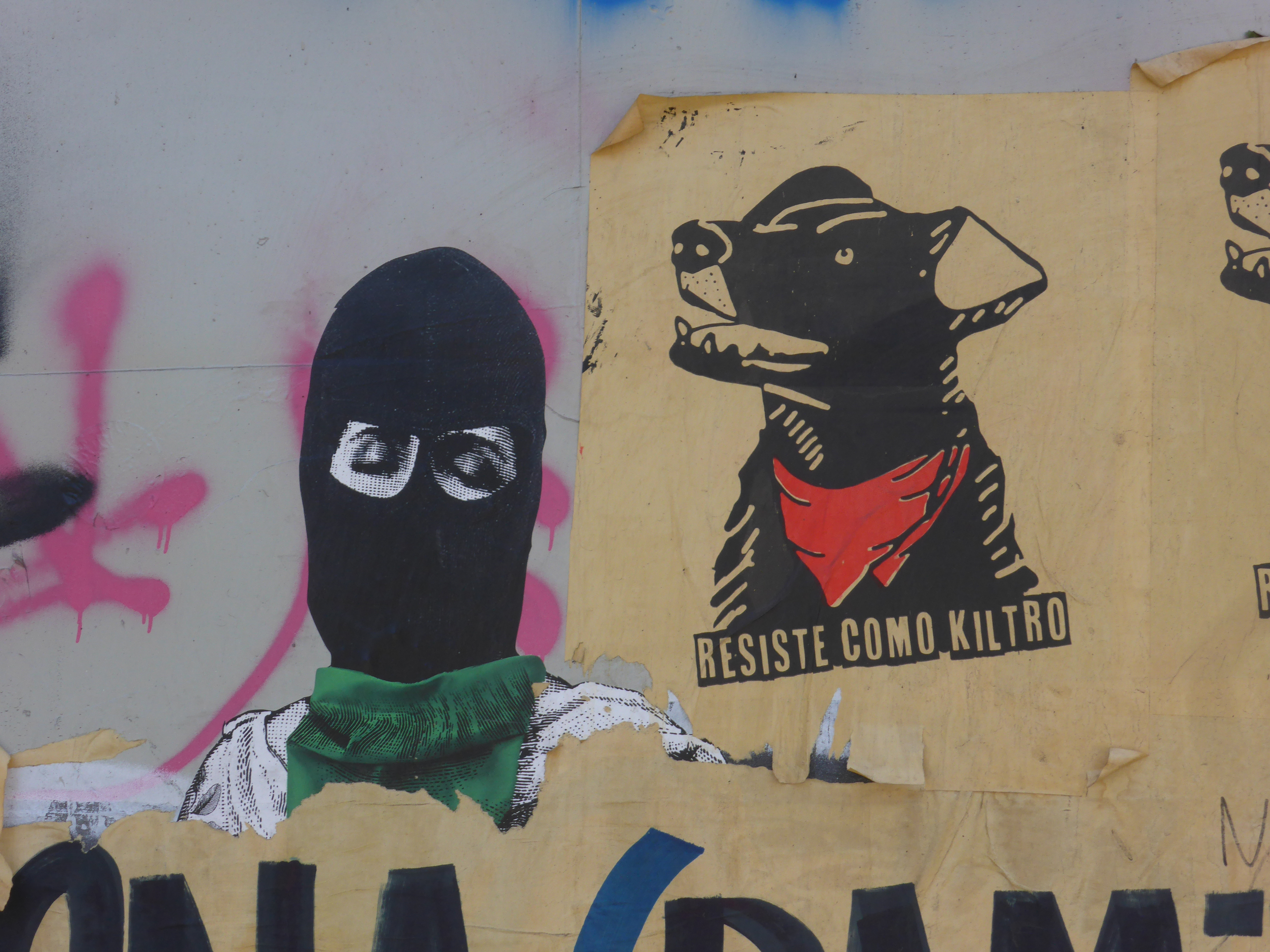
Poster of the Negro Matapacos dog symbol of social protests in Chile.

On 6 January 2020, university entrance exams to be taken by 300,000 students around Chile were disrupted by protests over inequality and elitism, with some students blocking access to test sites and burning exam papers.

At the end of January 2020, the social unrest (which had reduced somewhat during the Chilean summer holidays) resumed again with large demonstrations. The protests were catalysed by incidents such as the death of Jorge Mora, struck by a Carabinero vehicle after a football match. As of February 2020, an estimated 36 people had died. The Office of the UN High Commissioner for Human Rights (OHCHR) denounced the violence of the police and announced that between 18 October and 6 December 2019, 28,000 people had been imprisoned. The Instituto Nacional de Derechos Humanos (INDH) reported at the end of January 2020 that 427 persons had received eye injuries at the hands of the police. The INDH also recorded 697 attacks on lone civilians by state actors between the start of the protests in October and 31 January. Of these, 123 attacks were by Carabineros.

=== COVID-19 pandemic ===
The protests had to come to a halt due to the COVID-19 pandemic and the establishment of several partial lockdowns in Santiago and other cities. Taking advantage of the situation, government agencies erased most of the graffiti and street art in downtown Santiago that was drawn during the protests. On 3 April, President Sebastián Piñera visited an empty Plaza Italia and took some pictures in it, which was considered by many as a way of taunting the protesters under quarantine. Piñera later regretted the situation and mentioned that he was "misinterpreted". Despite the lockdown, some protests appeared during International Workers' Day in Santiago that resulted in the arrest of 57 people by Carabineros. Detained members of the international press were later released without charge. Similar incidents were reported in the port city of Valparaíso.

On 4 September 2020, police and demonstrators clashed at an anti-government protest at Plaza Italia.

On 11 September 2020, the 47th anniversary of the Pinochet coup, protestors clashed with Santiago police at the central Plaza Italia that resulted in over one hundred arrests. Sixteen police officers and two civilians were injured.

In the following weeks, small protests appeared again in Plaza Italia usually on Fridays and were severely repressed by Carabineros. On 2 October, an incident occurred when a police officer pushed a 16-year-old protester off the Pío Nono bridge into the Mapocho river. The minor suffered several fractures and concussion and was rescued by protesters. The situation sparked new protests on Saturday, 3 October near Plaza Italia, being the first time since the start of a national lockdown that the square is taken by protesters. Opposition politicians called for the resignation of General Director Mario Rozas and announce an impeachment to the Ministry of Interior Víctor Pérez. Also, they announce they will reject the annual budget for Carabineros unless changes are implemented. The officer is under arrest and charged with attempted murder by the National Public Prosecutor.

On 18 October 2020, a year after the protests of 18 October 2019, individuals set a fire on the Parroquia de La Asunción in Santiago, resulting in the bell tower collapsing from the fire. One of the five suspects is a Chilean Navy Corporal, which may have been an infiltrator from the Armed Forces, this was denied by the government and the Navy. Corporal Ernesto Osorio was discharged from the Navy, while he is under investigation for his involvement in the arson. Two Catholic churches in Santiago were burned as well.

On 3 November 2020, Interior and Security Minister Víctor Pérez resigned after being suspended from his duties when the Chamber of Deputies voted in favor of an investigation over allegations he failed to stop police abuses during protests.

On 18 November 2020, hundreds demonstrated in the capital demanding President Piñera's resignation with regards to police repression of the protests.

== Incidents and casualties ==
State of emergency and curfew State of emergency

During the protests 36 people have died as of February 2020, and thousands have been injured and arrested. Amnesty International has received hundreds of complaints about serious human rights violations that range from excessive use of force to torture, illegal raids and arbitrary detention. Similar allegations have been received by the National Institute for Human Rights, which also included reports of sexual violence.

On 18 October, President Sebastián Piñera declared a state of emergency, ordering the deployment of military forces across key areas to restore order, prevent the destruction of public property, and try dozens of detainees before a military court. A curfew was also declared on 19 October in the greater Santiago area, the first since 1987, during the final years of dictator Augusto Pinochet's rule.

=== Incidents ===
- 19 October
  - Two women died and one man was seriously injured in a fire inside a supermarket in the southern Santiago suburb of San Bernardo.
  - A Polish teacher was accidentally shot and killed by his father-in-law, who was trying to stop looters in a nearby supermarket.
- 20 October
  - A 38-year-old man died in a supermarket fire on Matucana Avenue, located along the border of Santiago and Quinta Normal.
  - Five people died in a textile factory fire in Renca; three of them were minors.
  - A 21-year-old protester was shot dead by soldiers in La Serena; another was seriously injured.
  - A 23-year-old protester was shot dead inside a La Polar store by soldiers in Coquimbo.
- 21 October
  - Two people, one of them 74 years old, died in a supermarket fire in La Pintana.
  - A 25-year-old man was shot and killed in Curicó, and the investigation indicated, due to the bullet found, that he had been shot by a business-owner's gun, and another three people were seriously injured. (The city was not under a state of emergency.)
  - In the commune of Talcahuano, in the city of Concepción during a period of looting, military forces ran over and killed a 23-year-old man.
  - A man was fatally electrocuted during looting in a Santa Isabel supermarket in a suburb of Santiago.
  - A 39-year-old man died in a hospital from injuries sustained in a beating carried out by policemen in Maipú, western Santiago. (His name was initially not included on the official list of dead; it was added on 23 October.)
- 22 October
  - A man was killed after being shot in the head by a tenant who feared looting.
  - A driver rammed his car into protesters killing two people, including a 4 year old toddler, and wounding 17; this event increased the death toll to 17.
- 10 November 2019 – Reñaca shooting
  - John Cobin opened fire on Chilean demonstrators in Reñaca, wounding Luis Jesús Ahumada Villegas, a 33-year old protester, in the leg.
- 27 December
  - Following the last protest march of the year, a demonstrator called Mauricio Fredes died after falling into a construction hole, whilst being pursued by police.
- 31 January
  - A man who had been shot in the head at a protest outside a police station in Santiago died of his wounds in hospital.
  - The body of a man thought to have died from carbon monoxide poisoning was recovered from a supermarket which had been looted and burnt.

=== Excessive use of force ===
According to the National Institute of Human Rights (INDH), the use of rubber pellets by security forces has left at least 964 injured, including 222 with eye problems. According to the Chilean Ophthalmology Society, this is the highest number of injuries of this type registered during protests or in conflict zones in the world. Bandaged eyes had become so common that they become a symbol for protesters.

Human rights organisations have received several reports of violations conducted against protesters, including torture, sexual abuse and rape. Amnesty International's investigations "allege that state security forces, including both the police and army, deliberately use excessive force against protesters." Amnesty International went on to state that "[the military and police] are using unnecessary and excessive force with the intention of injuring and punishing protesters." According to Erika Guevara-Rosas, the America's director for the human rights group, "the intention of the Chilean security forces is clear: to injure demonstrators in order to discourage protest." Human Rights Watch stated that "indiscriminate and improper use of riot guns and shotguns, abuse of detainees in custody, and poor internal accountability systems gave rise to serious violations of the rights of many Chileans".

=== Other incidents ===
==== 2019 ====
- On 18 October, during riots at the historical Estación Central station, a young woman was gravely injured in the legs by gunfire from Carabineros riot police. The woman was aided by nearby protesters and passers-by as she suffered extensive blood loss before being extracted by emergency services.
- On 19 October, a doctor assaulted by a police officer during a protest indicated that the police officer had signs of being under the influence of drugs.
- On 20 October, President Piñera extended the state of emergency in the north and south of the country and said "we are at war against a powerful enemy that doesn't respect anything or anyone".
- On 8 November, the Pedro Valdivia University was set ablaze. Initial reports suggested this was due to the indiscriminate firing of tear gas canisters by Carabineros into the building. The Roman Catholic church Veronica de Lastarria near the main site of the demonstration at Baquedano Square (commonly referred to as Italia Square) has been looted and a statue of Jesus and furniture from the interior of the church were taken out on the street and burned down.
- On 27 December, in the night, the Cine Arte Alameda, an arts center, was burnt down. An investigation by the Criminal Investigation Brigade (Brigada de Investigación Criminal) is reported to have concluded that no explanation for the fire could be ruled out.

==== 2020 ====
- On 18 January, the tomb of folksinger Víctor Jara was vandalised.
- On 20 January, at a protest following the death of Jorge Mora, a group of Carabineros beat up a young man called Matías Soto. The entire attack was recorded by a security camera. The INDH announced it would sue the Carabineros for torture.
- On 7 February, the Violeta Parra Museum was arson attacked. The chief of the Santiago Fire Department said the causes were not yet established.
- On 28 February, the Violeta Parra Museum was again arson attacked, with eyewitnesses recording that Carabineros shot at least 6 tear gas canisters into the building. Officially, the cause was not ascertained.
- By August 20, 2020, newspaper La Tercera reported that only 0.9 of the legal complaints originating from the protests had so far resulted in convictions.
- On 18 October, a year after the start of the social outbreak, a series of demonstrations took place in which some 25,000 people gathered in various cities of the country. Although the majority were peaceful, within the framework of the Chile national plebiscite of 2020's campaign, there were isolated clashes with police, 580 people being detained, and two severe fires were registered in the Church of San Francisco de Borja and in the Parroquia de la Asunción, two Catholic churches of Santiago.

==== 2021–2022: Aftermath ====
- On 5 February, street artist Francisco Martínez dies after being shot by a police official during an identity check in Panguipulli, Los Ríos Region. His death generated a wave of protests, riots, and vandalism, resulting later that night in the burning of the building that housed various public offices, including Panguipulli's town hall.
- On 12 March, the four-ton statue of General Baquedano was removed from the Plaza Baquedano to be restored by the "National Council of Monuments" after continuous acts of vandalism by protesters. Attempts to burn and tear down the statue were made on 5 and 8 March, respectively, ultimately prompting the authorities to make the decision.
- On 30 May, the headquarters of the right-wing parties National Renewal and Independent Democratic Union were attacked and the Memorial to Jaime Guzmán was vandalized with graffiti.
- On 30 July, new Friday afternoon protests demanding the liberation of the "prisoners of the revolt" ended up with riots and vandalism at Barrio Lastarria, where many pubs and restaurants were heavily damaged by a mob.
- On 10 October, during a demonstration supporting indigenous rights in Santiago, Denisse Cortés was killed by a firework explosion in front of the Catholic University of Chile. She was a 43-year-old law student and human rights activist. The situation is under investigation.
- On 18 October, the second anniversary, around ten thousand people gathered in the surroundings of Plaza Baquedano. Subsequently, fainting and vandalism were recorded, which caused the destruction of the protective barrier at the base of the statue of General Baquedano and its fire. Supermarkets and fast food outlets were looted, and the stairs leading to the Santa Lucía hill were set on fire.
- On Friday April 1, 2022, one public transport bus was torched and one person was rammed by a police vehicle.
- On April 30, 2022, a former candidate for the Constitutional Convention was detained by police while providing protesters tires for building barricades.
- On 18 October 2022, the third anniversary, protests were arranged in Santiago, Concepción, Valparaíso, Antofagasta, Temuco and Valdivia. In Valparaíso secondary students marched along university students and social organizations. The group marched towards the National Congress of Chile. Towards the end of the march some protesters engaged the police. In Santiago and Antofagasta protesters erected barricades. Outside University of La Frontera in Temuco there were clashes between about 15 hooded protesters and police.

=== Government response ===
In late November 2019, security forces announced the suspension of the use of rubber pellets as a crowd control method in the protests.

== Interpretations ==
In the context of contemporary Latin American political thought, interpretations of the 2019–2020 Chilean protests have highlighted the limits of technocratic and structural explanations of political crises. Some authors have emphasised the role of interpretive breakdowns between institutions and society, framing the crisis as one of political understanding rather than solely of economic inequality. This approach is developed in works such as Hugo E. Herrera’s October in Chile: Event and Political Understanding (2019). Other scholars have offered normative analyses to explain such socio-political crisis. In Social Outbursts: A Political Philosophy of Material and Human Deprivation, a book primarily focused on the 2019–2020 Chilean social outburst, Marcello Ferrada de Noli advances the Theory of Objective Material Deprivation (TOMD) as a central explanatory model.

== Reactions ==
=== International reactions ===
==== NGOs ====
Human Rights Watch and Amnesty International both expressed concern over the government's response to the protests, citing "excessive use of force" by the Chilean Police, as well as "possible arbitrary detentions of demonstrators".

==== Solidarity protests ====
In New Zealand's largest city Auckland, hundreds of protesters staged a solidarity march on 27 October 2019.

==== Others ====
Polish party Lewica Razem issued official statement strongly supporting protests.

== Popular culture ==
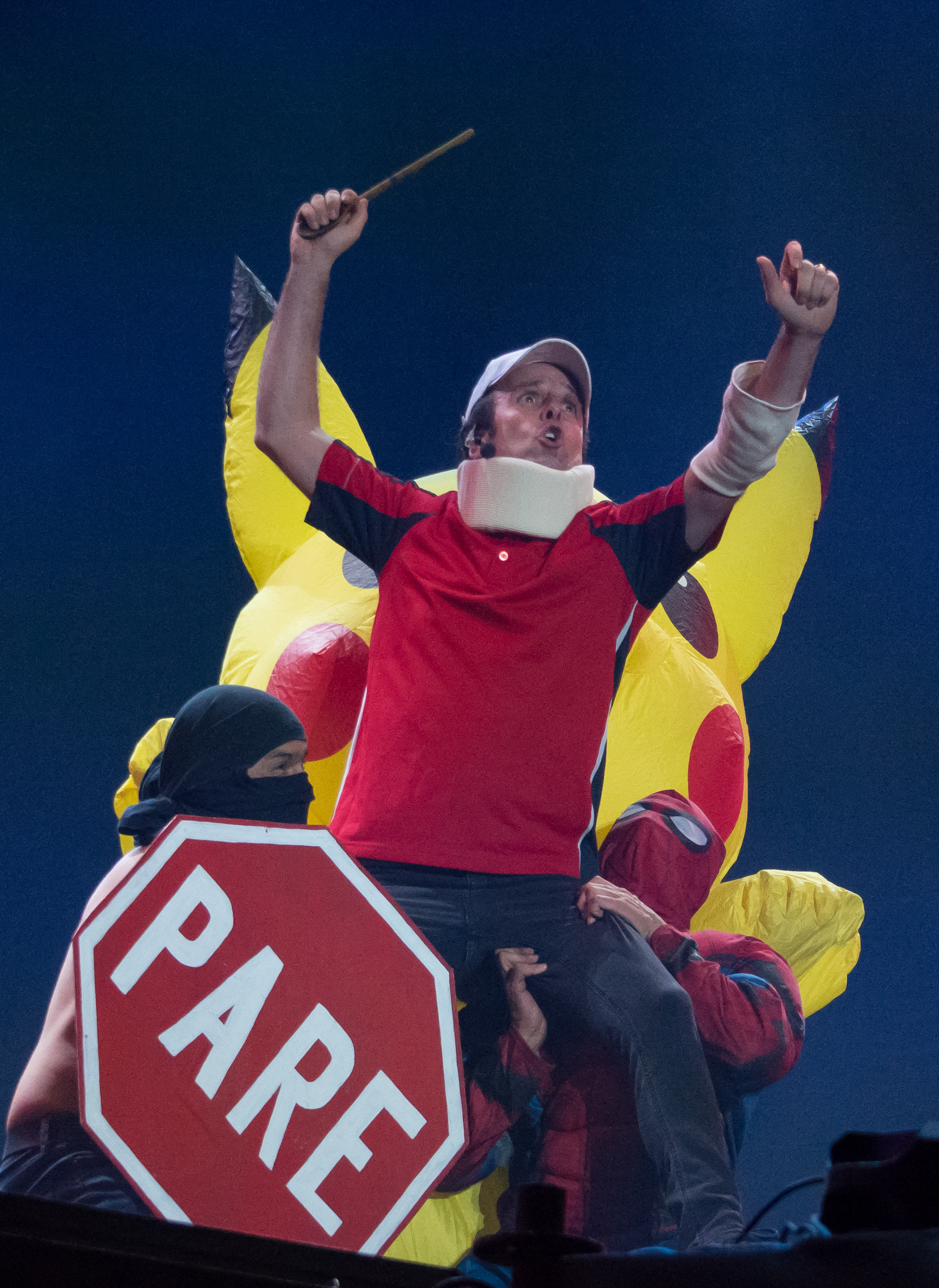
Comedian Stefan Kramer performing the "Primera Línea" at the Festival de Viña 2020, where he was harshly criticized by right-wing politicians for "praising and idealizing" violence.

Some costume-clad protesters have emerged as "superheroes" from among the many demonstrations and protests throughout the country. They have gained significant attention on social media by being captured with particular attitudes or outfits. After going viral, they were colloquially called the "Chilean Avengers", in reference to the superheroes of Marvel Comics. Among them stands out: "Baila Pikachu", "Stupid and sensual Spiderman", "Pareman", the "Dinosaur", "Nalcaman", the "Granny", the "Selknam", "Robin Hood", "Yutakiller" and the dog "Negro Matapacos". On 22 November 2019, some of them held a meeting recreating a scene from the movie The Avengers in Plaza Baquedano, organized by the production company Nano.
