= Anti-Barricade Law =

2019 Chilean law created in response to the protests

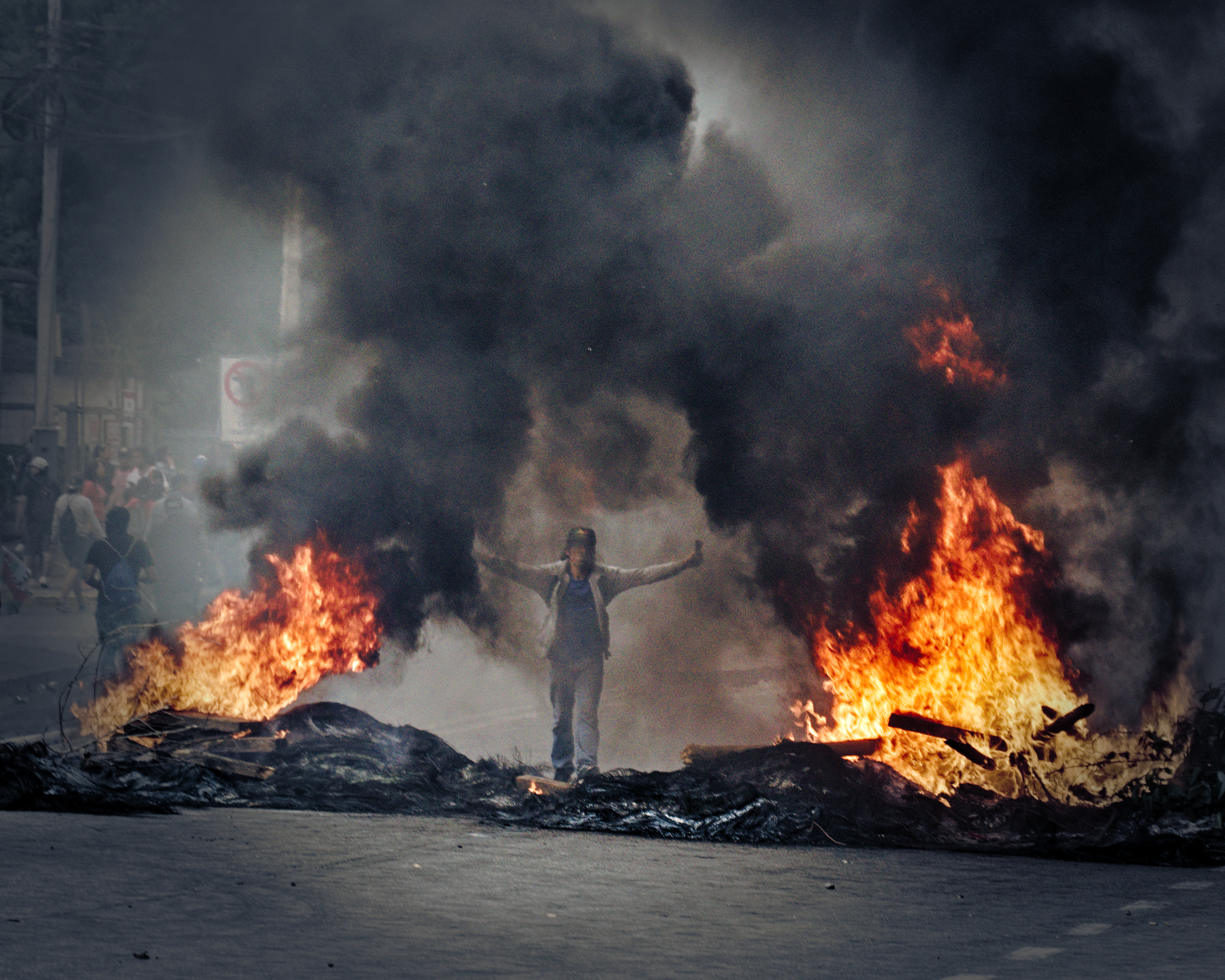
March to San Antonio, Chile, 12/11/19

The Anti-Barricade Law (Spanish: Ley Antibarricadas) is a Chilean law created in the context of the 2019–20 Chilean protests which increases the punishments for setting up barricades, carrying out plunder or throwing objects at people or vehicles. It modifies four articles of the Penal Code of Chile:

- 449 and 450: Penalties for various theft crimes have now no amelioration for first-time offenders. Custodial sentences for crimes committed during a calamity or a state of alteration of public order are increased by one degree.
- 268: Successfully blocking free passage by intimidation, threat of violence or with objects is now punished with no less than imprisonment at its least degree.
- 269: Disturbance of public tranquility motivated by aims judged reprehensible leads now to ordinary imprisonment in its least degree.

On March 3, 2020, a group of Primera Línea was rounded up and detained by Carabineros enforcing the newly drafted law. Subsequently, only one of the 44 detained was kept in preventive prison; the remaining were set free but required to report and sign-in twice a month. During the truck driver's strike of August 2020 in which a series of major roads and highways in Chile were blocked the Anti-Barricade Law was not applied. The President of the Federation of Chilean Industry (SOFOFA) Bernardo Larraín Matte criticized the government for this.
