= Gonzalo Blumel =

Chilean civil engineer and politician (born 1978)

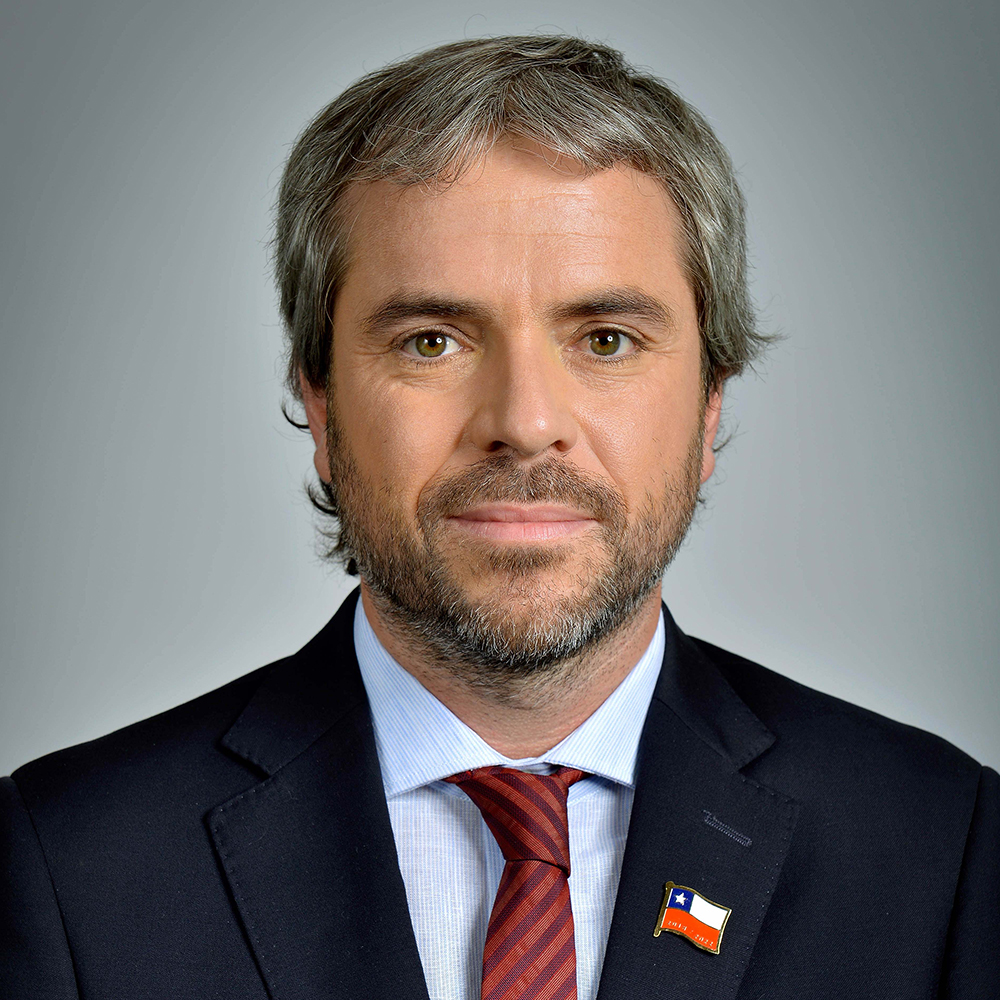

Minister of the Interior and Public Security of Chile
- In office 28 October 2019 – 29 July 2020
- Preceded by: Andrés Chadwick
- Succeeded by: Víctor Pérez Varela

Minister Secretary-General of the Presidency
- In office 11 March 2018 – 28 October 2019

Personal details
- Born: 12 May 1978 (age 48) Santiago, Chile
- Party: Political Evolution (2016–)
- Education: Pontifical Catholic University of Chile; University of Birmingham (Master of Arts in Economics)
- Occupation: Politician
- Profession: Environmental engineer

Gonzalo Fernando Blumel Mac-Iver (born 17 May 1978) is a Chilean politician, civil environmental engineer and economist who served as Minister of the Interior and Public Security of Chile during Sebastián Piñera second government (2018–2022).

== Biography ==
He is the son of Juan Enrique Blumel Méndez – grandson of the German explorer Santiago Blümel and Rosa Ancán, daughter of a Mapuche lonko from Nueva Imperial – and Emma Francisca Mac-Iver Prieto, great-granddaughter of Enrique Mac Iver (politician of Radical Party of Chile's liberal faction) and of Emma Ovalle Gutiérrez, granddaughter of Chilean President José Tomás Ovalle (1830–1831).

== Political career ==
He began his career in 2001 as a researcher at Pontificia Universidad Católica de Chile Center for the Environment of the Department of Industrial Engineering. In 2005, he assumed as planning secretary of the Municipality of Futrono. Later, he worked as a researcher for the environment program of Libertad y Desarrollo, right–wing think tank linked with libertarian conservatism ideas then represented by the party Independent Democratic Union (known in Spanish for his acronym: «UDI»), organization promoted by Augusto Pinochet dictatorship through his ideologist: the lawyer Jaime Guzmán (UDI founder).

He performed in three charges during President Piñera's first government, being – from March to July 2010 – Staff Chief of Cristián Larroulet (UDI), General Secretariat of the Presidency. Later, he was head of Studies Division in the same ministry and, finally, in March 2013, he became the president's chief adviser.

Once finished Piñera's first government, he was the CEO of Avanza Chile Foundation as well as he taught lessons also at PUC, his alma mater, or Universidad del Desarrollo (UDD). In 2016, he was one of founding member of the party Political Evolution, known in Chile for its acronym «Evópoli».

When Piñera returned to the presidency in 2018, Blumel was appointed as Minister Secretary General, the same charge where he collaborated with Larroulet. He served there until 28 October 2019, when he was called by Piñera to take the Ministry of the Interior charge amid 2019–20 riots in Chile commonly known as Estallido Social de Chile.
