= Mario Ríos Santander =

Chilean politician

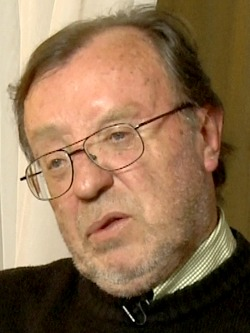

Member of the Senate of Chile
- In office 11 March 1990 – 11 March 2006
- Preceded by: District created
- Succeeded by: Víctor Pérez Varela
- Constituency: Bío Bío Region (19th Circumscription)

General Undersecretary of the Presidency
- In office 3 September 1977 – 1 June 1979
- Appointed by: Augusto Pinochet
- Preceded by: Hernán Brantes
- Succeeded by: Jovino Novoa

Mayor of Pudahuel
- In office 22 July 1977 – 2 January 1978
- Preceded by: Juan Deichler
- Succeeded by: Santiago Gajardo

Member of the Chamber of Deputies
- In office 15 May 1969 – 21 September 1973
- Succeeded by: 1973 coup d'état
- Constituency: Bío-Bío Province

Mayor of Los Ángeles
- In office 1966–1969

Personal details
- Born: 17 January 1945 (age 81) Santiago, Chile
- Party: United Conservative Party (1964–1966); National Party (1966–1973); Renovación Nacional (1987–present)
- Spouse(s): Patricia Peñafiel (div.); Sara Saavedra
- Children: Five
- Parent(s): Mario Ríos Padilla; María Santander
- Education: Pontifical Catholic University of Chile
- Occupation: Politician
- Profession: Philosopher

Mario Enrique Ríos Santander (17 January 1945) is a Chilean politician who served as a Senator and deputy.

He served as Senator for the 13th Southern Constituency, Biobío Region, for two consecutive terms between 1990 and 2006. He was Deputy for the 19th Departmental Grouping —La Laja, Nacimiento and Mulchén— for two consecutive terms between 1969 and 1977.

He also served as Undersecretary at the Ministry General Secretariat of Government between 1977 and 1979, and as Mayor of Los Ángeles and Pudahuel.

== Biography ==
=== Family and youth ===
He was born in Los Ángeles on 17 January 1945. He is the son of Mario Ríos Padilla and María Santander Gibs. He comes from a family closely linked to agricultural, public, and political activity; both his father and his grandfather, Víctor Ríos Ruiz, held legislative positions representing the Conservative Party.

He married Patricia Peñafiel, and in a second marriage, Sara Saavedra. He has five children.

=== Professional career ===
He completed his secondary education at Colegio San Ignacio in Santiago. After finishing school, he entered the Carlos Casanueva Institute, where he pursued courses in Philosophy, which he left unfinished in order to travel to France in 1963, where he came into contact with Parisian theatrical activity. In 1964, he attended as an auditing student courses in Art and Philosophy at the Pontifical Catholic University of Chile, where he simultaneously served for two years as Director of the Theatre Company of the Faculty of Law.

He obtained a degree in Philosophy and later worked as a professor in this field at the University of Concepción and at other Chilean and foreign institutions of higher education.

In the private sphere, from an early age and following the death of his father in 1964, he devoted himself to agricultural activities on the Campo Lindo and Campo Nuevo estates, located near the city of Los Ángeles in the Biobío Region, specializing in berry cultivation. In 1985, he received the distinction of “Best Beet Producer” and continues to engage in agricultural activities.

Among his multiple interests, his participation in cultural and philosophical activity also stands out, as a playwright, contributor to national media outlets, and scholar of religious institutional frameworks, becoming a worldwide reference in this field. He has been invited to give lectures and talks in Europe, Asia, and South America.

== Political career ==
He began his political career as a member of the Conservative Party and in 1967 joined the National Party. He was elected president of the party’s Youth in the Province of Biobío for one year. He served as provincial director of the party in 1969, later becoming a member of its General Board.

In 1966, he was elected municipal councilor (regidor) of the commune of Los Ángeles, representing the National Party, serving until 1969. He was one of its co-founders and participated in the drafting of the doctrinal document La Nueva República.

In 1974, he was appointed Mayor of Los Ángeles, and in 1976 he chaired the Chilean delegation to the Ibero-American Congress of Mayors. One year later, he was appointed Mayor of the commune of Pudahuel. In 1978, he served as President of Chile Films. In parallel, he acted as advisor to the Ministers of Health and Finance.

On 3 December 1977, he was appointed Undersecretary at the Ministry General Secretariat of Government, a position he held until 1 June 1979. During this period, he played a relevant role in coordinating agreements to avoid war with Argentina and served in an advisory capacity to General Augusto Pinochet.

In the field of public health administration, between 1979 and 1980 he served as Executive Director of the Health Area and Administrator of Hospitals of the National Corporation for Social Development, a position he assumed again in 1986. He promoted and presented a bill on the regionalization of health, which was approved by the respective ministry and the National Planning Office (ODEPLAN).

In 1987, he joined the National Renewal Party. In September 2002, he was elected regional president of the party in the Biobío Region with the highest majority, a position he held until 2006. In December 2005, he ran as a candidate for Senator for the 13th Senatorial Constituency for the 2006–2014 term, but was not elected.

He served as a member (minister) of the Electoral Qualification Tribunal (TRICEL) for the 2012–2016 term. In 2023, he ran as an independent candidate for the Constitutional Council on behalf of National Renewal, within the Chile Seguro list in the Ñuble Region. He was not elected, placing second within the pact with 6.05% of the vote.
