= Primera Línea =

Group of Chilean protesters

Flag used by the Primera Línea

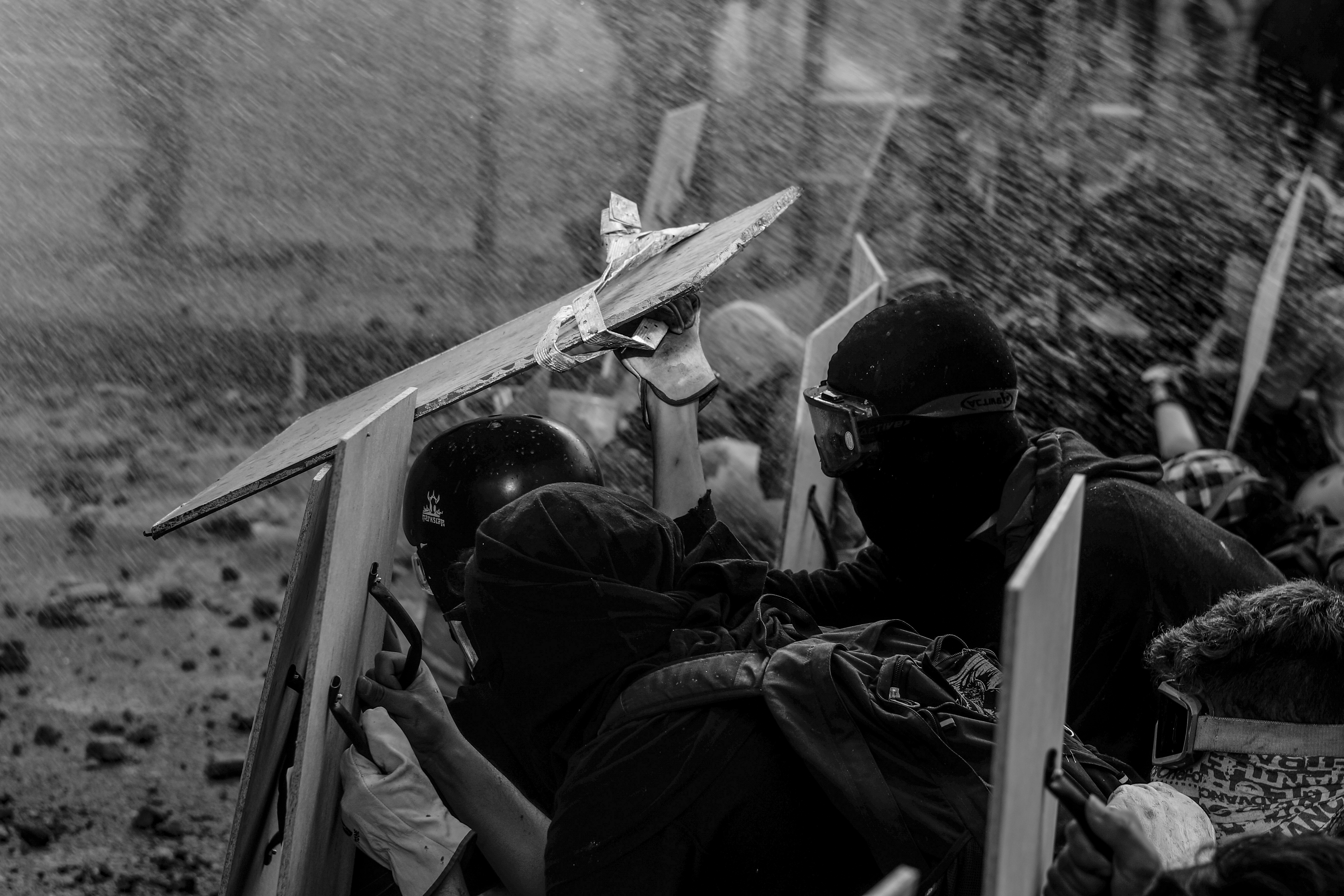
Shield-bearers hooded protesters

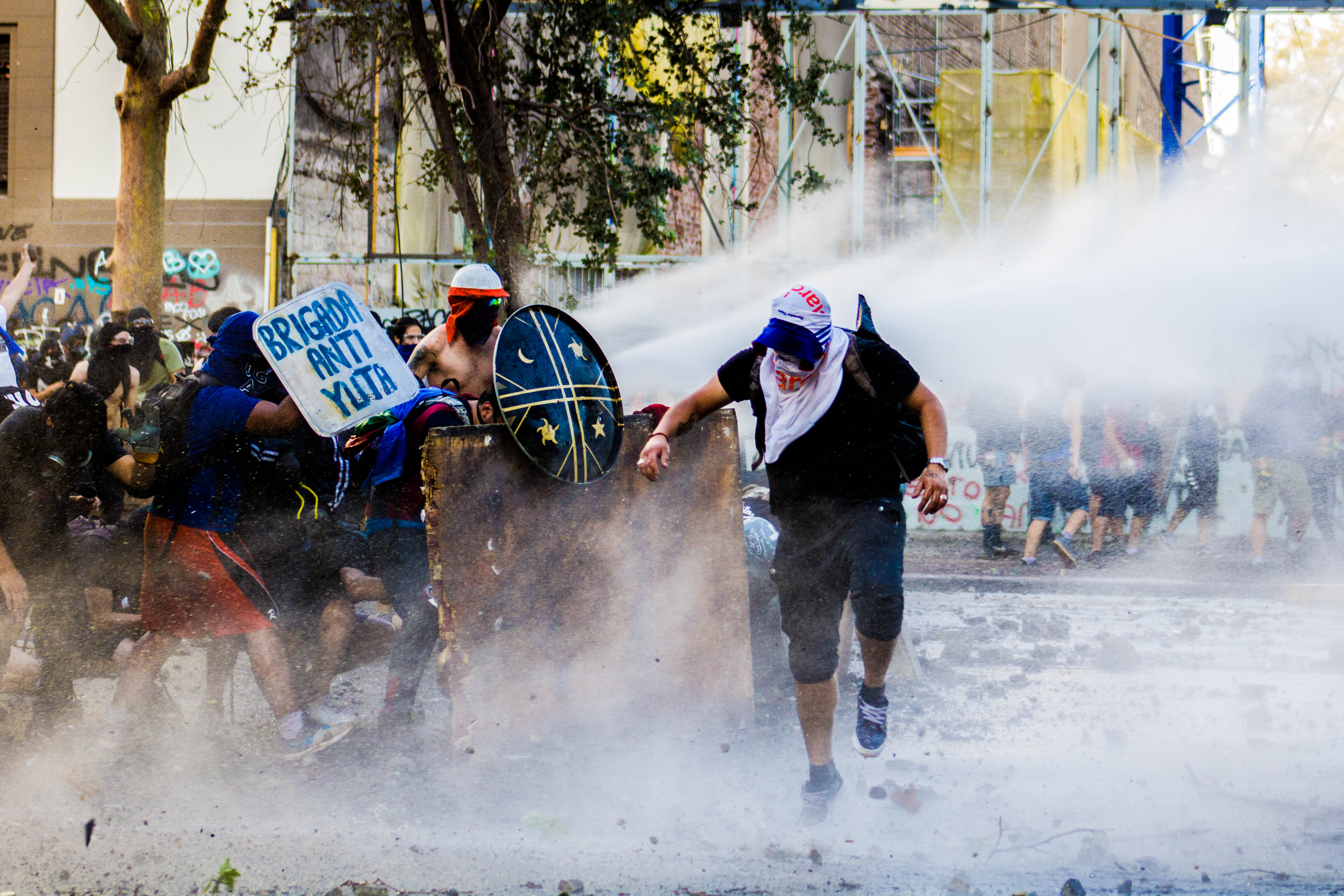
Group of protesters confronting Carabineros in 2019. The shield says "Brigada anti-yuta" (Chilean Spanish slang for "Anti-cop brigade")

Primera Línea (lit. 'First Line' or 'Frontline') is the name for a loose collective of protesters dedicated to physically confronting Chilean riot police, that is, through acts of civil disobedience, in the context of the 2019–2022 Chilean protests. In the words of a member "it's about contesting [state] power". The Primera Línea is made up of an assortment of individual citizens and grassroots organizations called "clans", lacking central authority. A wide range of sympathetic organizations support Primera Línea providing them with aid, food and legal advice. Members are of diverse backgrounds, including laborers, immigrants, university students and sports fans. In addition, 16 hooded minors identified as part of this strike force have been detained. They have subsequently been placed at the disposal of the National Service for Minors (Sename).

== Description ==
Members of Primera Línea tend to assume distinct roles, such as shield-bearers, stone-throwers, tear gas grenade extinguishers, slingers, laser pointers, and tear gas medics. Among these the laser pointers are the most numerous, their role consisting in disrupting police sight, yet there are cases where surveillance drones have been downed by the laser pointers. Although they do not have a homogeneous political and ideological position, it can be determined that they are members of the opposition to the government of Sebastián Piñera and have acquired an increasingly violent rivalry against Carabineros de Chile. They have frequently been associated with the anarchist movement of Chile and some of them recognize it explicitly.

Investigative journalist Santiago Pavlovic described them as "frustrated youth, homeless people, anarchists with a tendency to pyromania, delinquents taking advantage of disorder, kids with unleashed adrenaline, and some who saw a revolutionary opportunity", in the TVN Informe Especial report about the Estallido social broadcast in October 2020.

Primera Línea has been accused by authorities as a "member" of Antifa and some mass media of being behind many misdemeanor, yet other people recognize their contributions to shield ordinary protesters from police violence.

Members of Primera Línea are mostly hooded or with partially covered faces, being known in Chilean Spanish as "capuchas" (hooded men).

== Prosecution of its members ==
On March 3, 2020, a group of Primera Línea was rounded up and detained by Carabineros enforcing a newly drafted law against barricades. Subsequently, only one of the 44 detained was kept in preventive detention, the remaining people were set free but required to report and sign-in twice a month. In this context, the president of the Supreme Court of Chile, Guillermo Silva and National Prosecutor Jorge Abbott, have both declared that being part of Primera Línea does not constitute a crime in itself. Among the 44 detained, four had criminal records: two for theft, one for robbery and one with an extensive criminal record including previous sentences for drug dealing, domestic violence, carrying butterfly knives in public, street fighting and causing minor injuries. Despite the fact that when incarcerated they are classified as "political prisoners" by the protesters, and some left wing politicians such as Camila Vallejo, Tomás Hirsch and Claudia Mix, both the Government of Chile and Human Rights Watch Director José Miguel Vivanco, dismissed these accusations, the latter asserting in December 2020 that "there are no political prisoners in Chile". University of Chile's law professor Claudio Nash Rojas disagrees with this assessment. According to him some members of Primera Línea have been subject to political prison as they were put into preventive prison and declared "danger to society" (Spanish: peligro para la sociedad) without a case-by-case analysis. Chilean court's indiscriminate use of the highest level of precautionary measure (Spanish: medida cautelar) to members of Primera Línea may be understood as a political measure.

== Criticism ==
From different sectors, especially from the social-conservative sphere, this group has been criticized for its actions, as well as those who support or admire them, being considered as a "romanticization of violence", in addition to transgressing many social liberties such as freedom of expression, of movement, with the alteration of public order and social peace, creating a caricature of "superheroes" for their actions. On the other hand, for the Chilean columnist and constitutional conventionalist, Teresa Marinovic, has been publicly shown as skeptical of the "spontaneous" nature attributed to the formation of this group, alluding to its organizational capacity and "combat" tactics, which suggest a premeditation or prior organization to serve particular political interests.

== See also ==
- Eye injury in the 2019–2020 Chilean protests
- The biggest march of Chile
