= Milicogate =

Milicogate is a corruption scandal that implicates Chilean Army officers and funds. This scheme involves fraud and the misappropriation of public funds designated by the Secret Copper Law. The scandal was brought to light in 2015 through a story published by journalist Mauricio Weibel in The Clinic. As of March 2019, investigations conducted by prosecutors revealed that at least 6.1 billion Chilean pesos had been embezzled.
