= Víctor Pérez Varela =

Chilean politician

Víctor Pérez
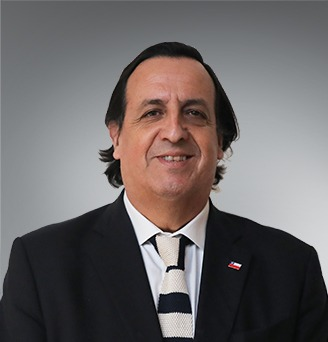
- Official portrait (2020)

Minister of the Interior and Public Security
- In office 28 July 2020 – 4 December 2020
- Preceded by: Gonzalo Blumel
- Succeeded by: Rodrigo Delgado

Member of the Senate
- In office 11 March 2006 – 28 July 2020
- Preceded by: Mario Ríos Santander
- Succeeded by: Claudio Alvarado
- Constituency: 13th Circunscription

Member of the Chamber of Deputies
- In office 11 March 1990 – 11 March 2006
- Preceded by: Creation of the district
- Succeeded by: Juan Lobos Krause
- Constituency: 47th District

Mayor of Los Ángeles
- In office 1981–1987
- Preceded by: Almiro Díaz Boggiano
- Succeeded by: Ricardo Acuña Casas

Personal details
- Born: 18 October 1954 (age 71) Santiago, Chile
- Party: Unión Demócrata Independiente (1993–)
- Spouse: Ana María Sierra (1980–)
- Children: Four
- Parent(s): Claudio Pérez; Julieta Varela
- Education: Universidad de Concepción
- Occupation: Politician
- Profession: Lawyer

Víctor Claudio José Pérez Varela (born 18 October 1954) is a Chilean lawyer and politician who has served as minister and parliamentary.

A Chilean lawyer and politician affiliated with the Independent Democratic Union (UDI), he served as a member of the Senate of Chile for the 10th Senatorial District (Biobío and Ñuble Regions) between 2014 and 2020, and for the 13th Senatorial District (Biobío Region) during the periods 2006–2014 and 2014–2018.

He previously served as a member of the Chamber of Deputies of Chile for District No. 47 (Biobío Region) for four consecutive terms between 1990 and 2006. He was Mayor of Los Ángeles between 1981 and 1987. From 28 July 2020 to 3 November 2020, he served as Minister of the Interior and Public Security in the government of President Sebastián Piñera.

== Biography ==
He was born on 18 October 1954 in Santiago, Chile. He is the son of Claudio Renato Pérez Arriagada and Julieta Inés Varela Carter. He has four children.

He completed his secondary education at the Liceo José Victorino Lastarria and the Liceo de Hombres de Concepción. After finishing secondary school, he entered the Faculty of Law at the University of Concepción.

He qualified as a lawyer from the University of Concepción on 8 June 1981. In professional terms, he has practiced law independently.

== Political career ==
He began his political activity during his university years, when he was elected class delegate to the Student Council of the School of Law.

From 1972, he was a member of the youth wing of the National Party, participating in mobilizations opposing the government of President Salvador Allende.

Following the military coup, around 1974–1975 he became politically associated with Jaime Guzmán. In the late 1970s, after completing his law studies, he worked at the Los Ángeles office of the National Youth Secretariat (SNJ).

In 1981, he was appointed Mayor of Los Ángeles, a position he held until 1987. In September 1983, he was one of the founders of the Independent Democratic Union in the commune of Los Ángeles.

During the 1988 national plebiscite, he served as the Biobío regional delegate for the Yes campaign supporting the continuation of Augusto Pinochet as President of the Republic.

He served as a deputy and senator for a total of thirty years. From 28 July 2020 until 3 November 2020, when he submitted his resignation, he served as Minister of the Interior and Public Security under President Sebastián Piñera.

On 8 October 2020, a group of members of the Chamber of Deputies filed an impeachment against him. It was declared admissible by the Chamber of Deputies on 3 November 2020 and advanced to the Senate, where it was rejected on 16 November 2020.

On 12 December 2020, he ran for the presidency of the UDI, but was defeated by the list led by Deputy Javier Macaya.
