= Rodrigo Delgado =

Chilean politician

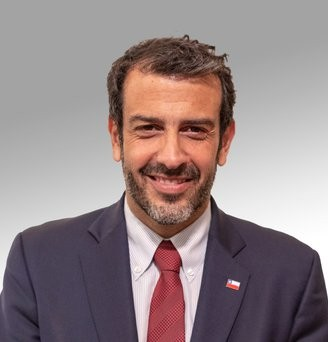
- Official portrait, 2020

Interior and Public Security Minister
- In office 4 November 2020 – 11 March 2022
- President: Sebastián Piñera
- Preceded by: Víctor Pérez Varela
- Succeeded by: Izkia Siches

Mayor of Estación Central
- In office 6 December 2008 – 4 November 2020
- Preceded by: Gustavo Hasbún
- Succeeded by: Miguel Abdo

Personal details
- Born: Rodrigo Javier Delgado Mocarquer; 13 June 1974 (age 52) La Ligua, Chile
- Party: Independent Democrat Union
- Spouse: Nicole Nef (m. 2014)
- Children: 3
- Education: Andrés Bello University
- Profession: Psychologist

Rodrigo Javier Delgado Mocarquer (born 13 June 1974) is a Chilean psychologist and politician, member of the Independent Democrat Union (UDI) party. From 4 November 2020 until 11 March 2022, he served as Minister of the Interior and Public Security of Chile, under the second administration of Sebastián Piñera.

Previously, between 2008 and 2020, he was mayor of the Estación Central commune.

== Biography ==
=== Personal life ===
Son of Jorge Delgado Toro Mazote and Eliana Mocarquer Mucarquer, he lived his childhood with his family in La Ligua, in the Valparaíso Region. He is of Palestinian descent through his mother.

Since 19 October 2014, he has been married to Nicole Nef, daughter of former soccer player Adolfo Nef. The couple has 3 children, including twins. As of 27 March 2026, they're expecting a fourth child.

=== Studies and professional career ===
He attended high school at the Arab School of Santiago, and studied psychology at Andrés Bello National University, graduating as a psychologist in 1999. He also has certifications in Corporate Social Responsibility from the University of Chile, and certifications in Excellence in Municipal Services and Management of Local Governments from the University for Development (UDD).

He practiced psychology at the Option Youth Center of Cerro Navia. Later he worked at the Lampa Youth Center.

In 2000 he became director of Community Development of the Municipality of Estacion Central, under mayor Gustavo Hasbún, where he remained for eight years.

== Political career ==
He was elected mayor of Estación Central, part of Greater Santiago, in the 2008 municipal elections for the 2008–2012 period. He was reelected in the municipal elections of 2012 and 2016, serving three terms in total, for which he was unable to seek reelection for a fourth term after the entry into force of Law 21,238. Since 2019 he was vice president of the Chilean Association of Municipalities (AMUCh), and in April 2020, he became president of the association, succeeding José Miguel Arellano, mayor of Padre Hurtado.

On 4 November 2020, he resigned as mayor of Estación Central, so he could become the Minister of the Interior and Public Security in the second government of President Sebastián Piñera, after the resignation of Víctor Pérez Varela from that position the day before.

At the end of 2020, he was invited by the Ministry of Health (Minsal) to join the COVID-19 task force.

During his tenure, the Municipality of Estación Central granted building permits to the real estate company Placilla SpA, which were declared illegal by the Constitutional Court, since they contravene the regulations of the Ministry of Housing and Urbanism that make "continuous building" impossible in an area that has no height limit.

== Election history ==
=== Municipal elections of 2008 ===
- 2008 municipal elections for mayor of Estacion Central

Candidate	Coalition	Political party	Votes	%	Outcome
Guillermo Flores Contreras	Por un Chile Limpio	ILA - Independent	6734	11.40	
Nestor Santander Moreno	Concertacion Democratica	PDC - Christian Democratic Party (Chile)	12 343	20.90	
Hugo Gutierrez Galvez	Juntos Podemos Mas	PC - Communist Party of Chile	18 567	31.44	
Rodrigo Delgado Mocarquer	Alianza por Chile	UDI - Independent Democratic Union	21 404	36.25	Mayor

=== 2012 municipal elections ===
- 2012 municipal elections for mayor of Estacion Central

Candidate	Coalition	Political party	Votes	%	Outcome
René Osorio Serrano	Regionalistas e Independientes	PRI - Independent Regionalist Party	1948	4.08	
Camilo Ballesteros Briones	Por un Chile Justo	PC - Communist Party of Chile	21 548	45.21	
Rodrigo Delgado Mocarquer	Coalicion	UDI - Independent Democratic Union	22 170	46.51	Mayor

=== 2016 municipal elections ===
- 2016 municipal elections for mayor of Estacion Central

Candidate	Coalition	Political party	Votes	%	Outcome
Angelica Cid Venegas	Nueva Mayoria	PS - Socialist Party of Chile	12 400	39.08	
Rodrigo Delgado Mocarquer	Chile Vamos	UDI - Independent Democratic Union	15 431	48.63	Mayor
Doris González Lemunao	Pueblo Unido	ILM - Independent	2605	8.21	
Mauricio Santander Videla	Independientes (Fuera de pacto)	IND - Independent	1294	4.08	
