= José Miguel Vivanco =

American human rights activist

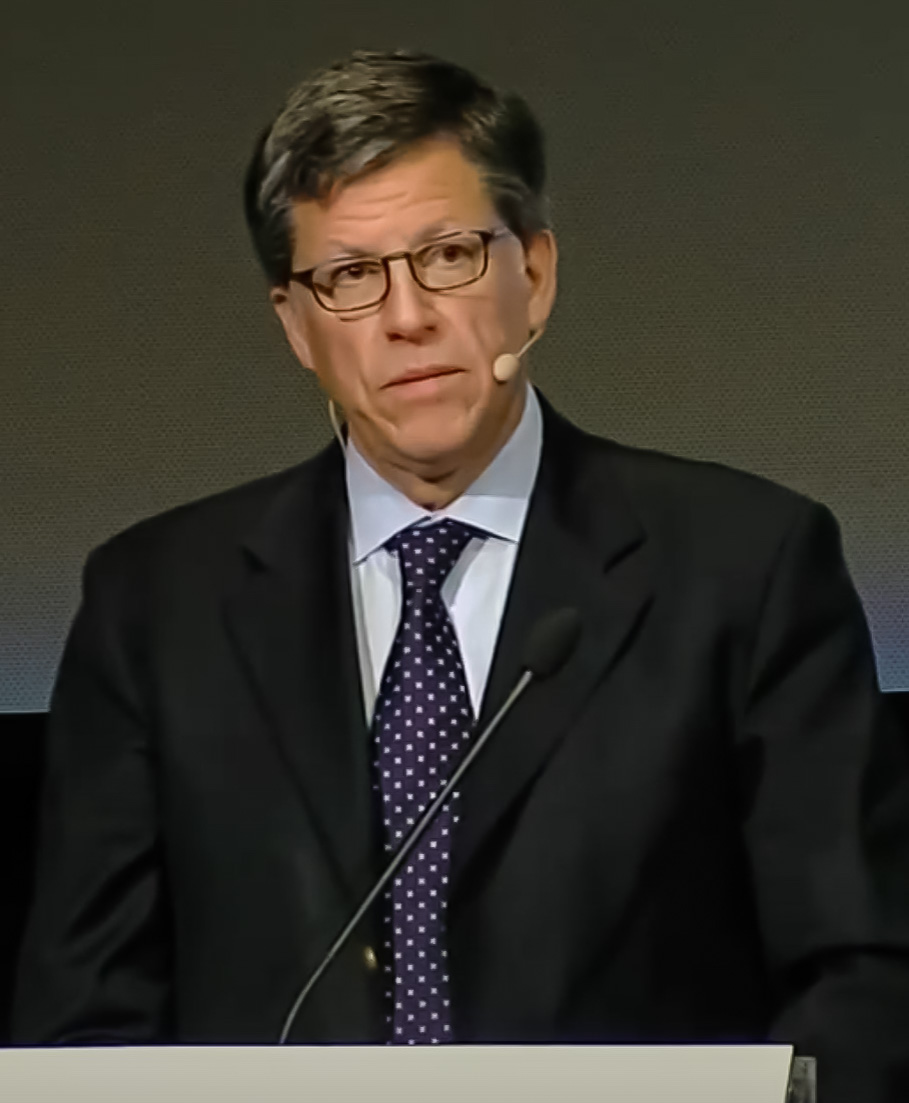
- Vivanco in 2014
- Born: January 3, 1961 (age 65); Chile
- Education: University of Chile, Harvard Law School
- Occupation: Lawyer
- Known for: former executive director of the Americas Division of Human Rights Watch

José Miguel Vivanco Inostroza (born January 3, 1961) is a Chilean human rights lawyer, and the former executive director of the Americas Division of Human Rights Watch. He is now an Adjunct Senior Fellow at the Council on Foreign Relations.

== Biography ==
Vivanco graduated as a lawyer from the University of Chile and later studied for a master's degree in law from Harvard. After graduating from his master's degree, he worked at the Inter-American Commission on Human Rights of the Organization of American States (OAS), first as a legal advisor and then as a lawyer. In 1990 he founded the Center for Justice and International Law (Cejil), a non-governmental organization that presents complaints about the region to international human rights organizations.

In 1994 Vivanco began serving as executive director of the Americas Division of Human Rights Watch. He has also been an adjunct professor of law at Georgetown University Law Center, American University Washington College of Law, and the School of Advanced International Studies at Johns Hopkins University.
