= Highway Technologies =

US construction company

Highway Technologies, Inc. was a large, Houston-based US construction company with offices in 33 cities that filed for bankruptcy in May 2013, laying off 740 of its 825 employees. The company was founded 30 years ago.

The company supplied "highway barriers, traffic control devices and rent[ed] barriers for detours and emergency closures".

Liquidation of company assets began in June 2013 and continued through November 2013, with some local branches sold in their entirety to new owners.

== Locations ==
The company operated in over 30 US cities, with as many as 50 to 80 employees at some locations:

- Flagstaff, Arizona
- Fort Mohave, Arizona
- Prescott, Arizona (reopened as part of Trafficade Work Zone Services)
- Tempe, Arizona
- Tucson, Arizona
- San Jose, California
- Ventura, California
- Denver, Colorado, reopened as Colorado Barricade in August 2013.
- Loveland, Colorado
- Clearwater, Florida
- Fort Myers, Florida
- Jacksonville, Florida
- Jupiter, Florida
- Orlando, Florida
- Bloomington, Illinois
- Carbondale, Illinois
- East St. Louis, Illinois, reopened as Warning Lites of Southern Illinois, LLC in August 2013
- Springfield, Illinois
- Villa Park, Illinois
- Baton Rouge, Louisiana
- Minneapolis, Minnesota
- Springfield, Missouri
- Missoula, Montana
- Richland, New Jersey
- North Las Vegas, Nevada
- Portland, Oregon
- Austin, Texas
- Corpus Christi, Texas
- Fort Worth, Texas
- Houston, Texas
- San Antonio, Texas

== Company bankruptcy ==
The Houston-based company laid off 740 employees, of 825 total, on May 17, 2013, and filed for bankruptcy on May 22. The bankruptcy filing indicated that company assets were between $50 and $100 million while liabilities were between $100 and $500 million.

=== Disruptions ===
Event disruptions occurred as a result of the suspension of operations in a number of cities. In Denver, the Colfax Marathon and the American Ninja Warrior competition lost the contracted support services for the provision of traffic barricades for the event. Fifteen active projects were shut down in Montana by the closure of the Missoula office, where 180 employees lost their jobs.

=== Liquidation ===
"Bankruptcy was seen as the best option to protect the company's assets for its creditors". At the May 23, 2013, bankruptcy court hearing, approval was given "to start to sell any assets below $200,000. The company pursued the sale of its assets both piecemeal and on a turnkey — intact branches — basis through private sales and auctions"

Some Highway Technologies local enterprises were sold in their entirety to new owners. In early August, the Denver branch emerged from bankruptcy as Colorado Barricade, sold at a price of US$775,000 plus assumption of certain liabilities pertaining solely to the existing operation, and hired back some 20 of the 50-plus employees of Highway Technologies Denver operation within the first week of operation.

Over 60,000 remaining assets were sold off in auctions held between August and November 2013, including 4700 items sold at one two-day auction in Texas in late August.
