= Barricade =

Structure that creates a barrier or obstacle

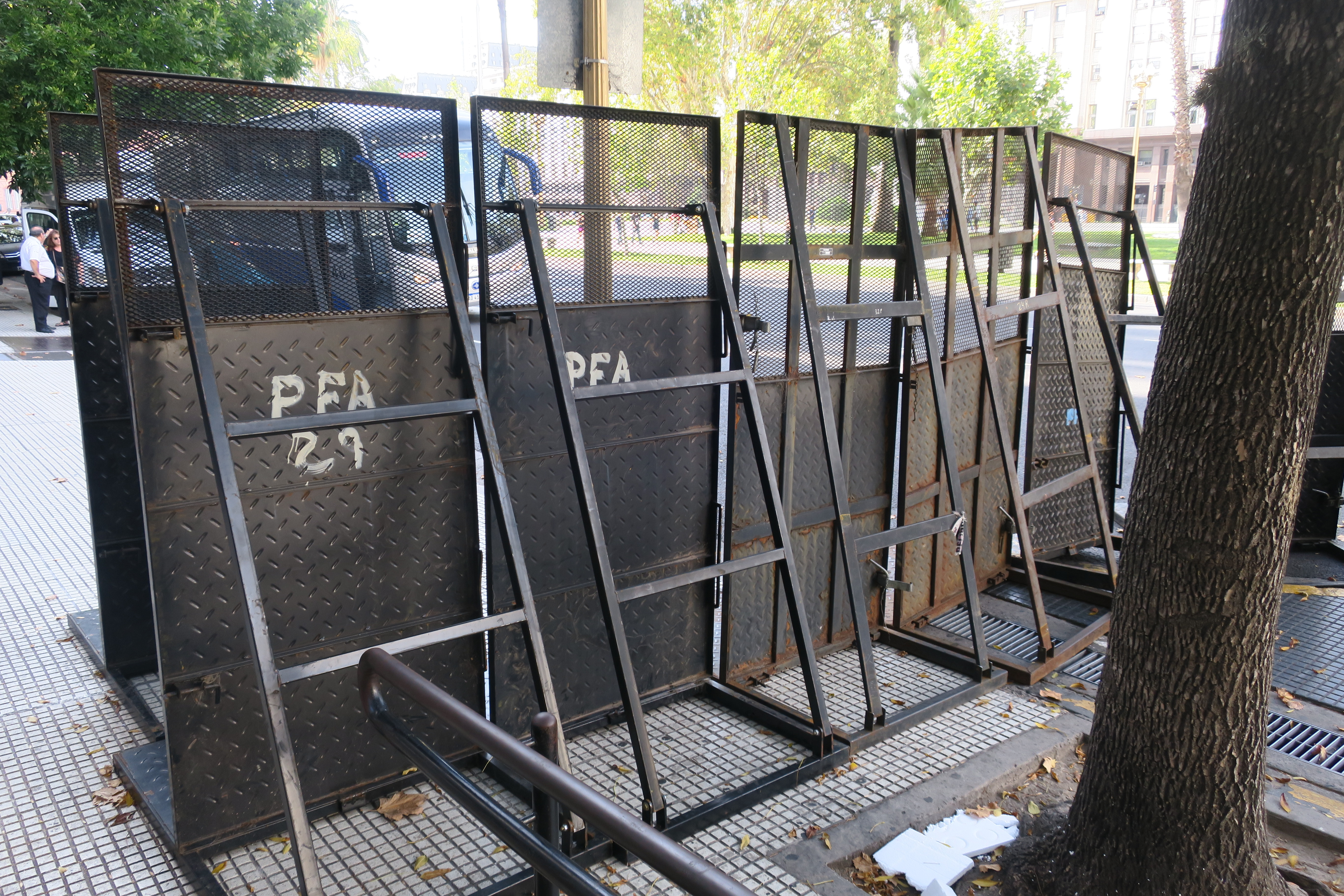
Police barricades in Buenos Aires, Argentina (2020)

Barricade (from French barrique 'barrel') is any object or structure that creates a barrier or obstacle to control, block passage or force the flow of traffic in the desired direction. Adopted as a military term, a barricade denotes any improvised field fortification, such as on city streets during urban warfare. These may also include crowd control devices—like temporary traffic barricades, pedestrian barricades, and anti-vehicle barriers—all of which have also been used in the course of urban protests, and counterinsurgency operations.

== Origins ==
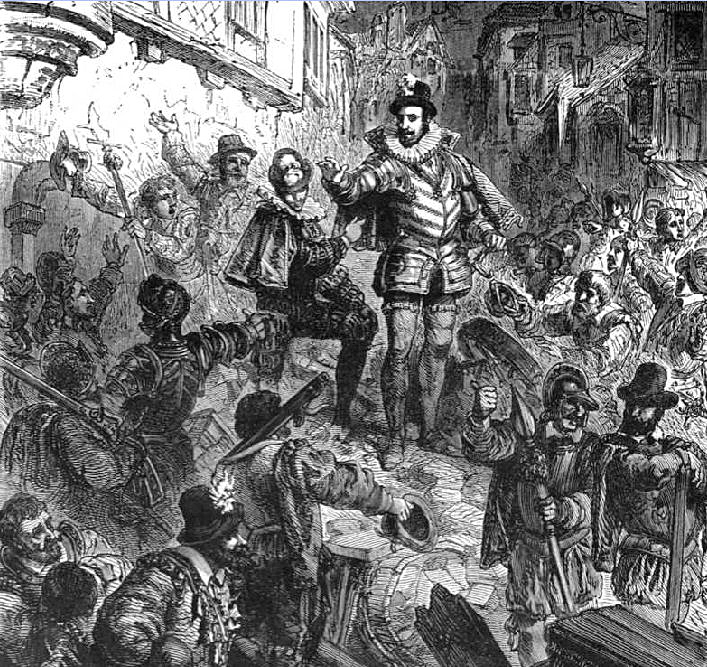
The Duc de Guise during the 'First Day of the Barricades'. Paul Lehugeur, 19th century

The origins of the barricade are often erroneously traced to the "First Day of the Barricades," a confrontation that occurred in Paris on 12 May 1588 in which supporters of the Duke of Guise and the ultra-Catholic Holy League successfully challenged the authority of King Henri III during the French Wars of Religion. Then, barrels were fundamental to the Holy League's defenses. They were filled with stone and earth to create effective fortifications, while chains were stretched across intersections to block passage. The League planned how to place these materials to obstruct Parisian streets as efficiently as possible. This severely hindered the movement of royal troops, who were unable to bypass the barricade structures placed throughout the city.

...Parisians from every social level rushed to support the League in what they feared might be another royal massacre. At this, everyone took up arms to safeguard the streets and neighbourhoods and made barricades by stretching chains across the street corners.

Although barricades gained widespread public awareness as a result of the 1588 1st Day of the Barricades (and because they were also used during the Fronde), they were neither exclusively French nor exclusively modern in origin. In ancient history, barricades were used as defensive fortifications, primarily in cities defending against foreign invaders. During the Persian sack of Athens from 480 to 479 BCE, the last remaining Greek soldiers defended the Acropolis of Athens against Persian invaders using barricade-like structures in a final stand against the approaching army. Similarly, during the Theban siege of Plataea from 429 to 427 BCE, the Plataeans placed "wagons in the streets as barricades" after they realized the Thebans had infiltrated the city.

Improvised fortifications like these were also used elsewhere on the planet. In the ancient Maya city of Chunchucmil, located in the Yucatán Peninsula of Mexico, barricades made out of rubble from nearby houses were used to complement existing city walls when the local population attempted to defend itself against neighboring Maya invaders. This invasion and subsequent abandonment of the city occurred within the Classic Maya period (250-900 CE). Later examples of the use of barricades in the Americas include Tacky's Revolt in Jamaica in 1760-61, in the course of which slaves rebelling against European masters built barricaded strongholds throughout the Island.

== Modern barricade ==
In Europe, barricade construction developed in France in the sixteenth century and remained a predominantly French practice for two centuries. During the nineteenth century, the barricade became the preeminent symbol of a revolutionary tradition. Parisian uprisings from 1830 to 1871 lent the barricade political significance as workers and the bourgeoisie used them to halt armies and assert republican intentions. In 1848, the barricade appeared throughout Europe (Milan, Vienna, Berlin), where citizens adapted barricades to local urban landscapes to challenge imperial authority. In colonial settings, the tactic was sometimes reversed: European powers deployed barricades to defend themselves against popular revolts by colonized peoples. Consequently, the barricade became a revolutionary emblem: it marked the threshold between state authority and popular resistance in ways that would echo across subsequent global movements.

=== Barricade in European revolutionary struggles ===
==== Paris: 1830, 1848, 1871 ====
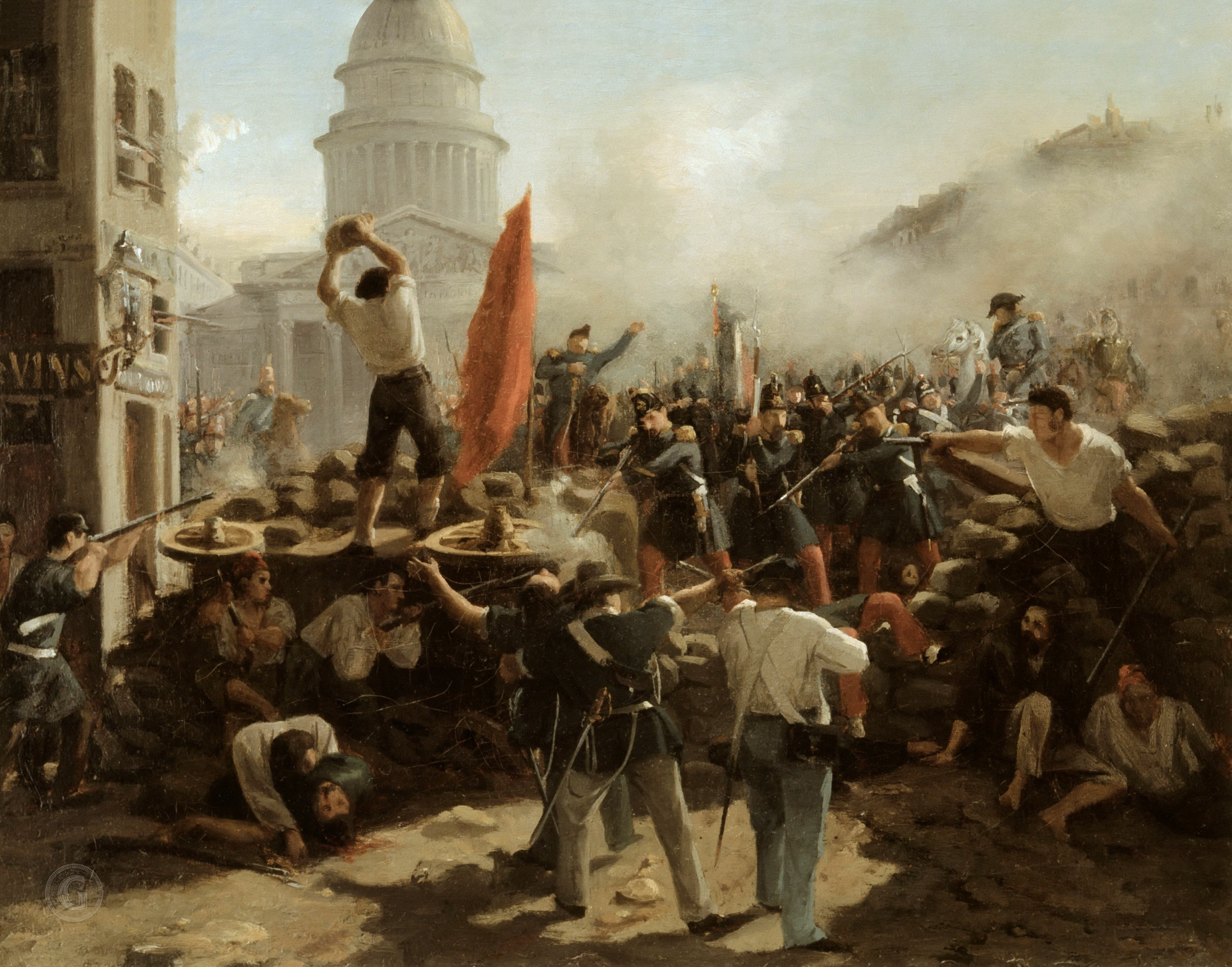
Street Fighting on Rue Soufflot, Paris, June 25, 1848

Barricades were a highly visible and consequential element in many of the insurrections that occurred in France throughout the nineteenth century. French citizens constructed them during three successive periods of urban rebellions against their own governments: first against the Bourbon Monarchy in 1830, then against the July Monarchy and the Second Republic in 1848, and finally against the emerging Third Republic during the Paris Commune of 1871. Although each uprising had its own triggers, they were all primarily driven by urban workers, artisans, and students who rose against governments they felt were illegitimate, repressive, or unresponsive to their pleas for social and political reform. Beginning with the July Revolution in 1830, barricades were used to dissuade aggressors from gaining access to certain areas. As Traugott highlights, "The July Revolution in Paris stands as the largest barricade event ever documented... for, if contemporary estimates are to be credited, some 4,000 were built in all." Using their knowledge of the urban landscape of Paris, residents of the city rapidly assembled barricades out of makeshift materials, such as stones, furniture, and other debris found in the streets. Citizens used barricades to isolate sections of the July Monarchy's forces to prevent them from receiving reinforcements, ultimately making it easier for the insurgents to corral and defeat them. According to Harsin and Traugott, barricades were constructed in large numbers to cut off the army, enabling revolutionaries to control key streets and impede movement. Likewise, Jill Harsin cites barricades' tactical use during 1848, saying: "...barricades were constructed during the evening and night to stop reinforcements from reaching the city."

During the short-lived Paris Commune in 1871, the barricade continued to serve a tactical function, allowing Communard defenders to manipulate the advance of opposing forces. However, due to the process of Haussmannization initiated two decades earlier, the broad boulevards of Paris were too wide to barricade effectively. John Merriman notes that "It was more difficult to barricade boulevards than narrow workers quartiers... The Army of Versailles could blast away at these major arteries while outflanking the defensive impediments." Although these structural changes to the city reduced the barricades' tactical effectiveness, their propaganda function grew. In some instances, barricades were constructed "expressly" for the purpose of their photographic reproduction and dissemination.

==== Milan, Berlin, Vienna: 1848 ====
The barricade played a significant role in the Belgian Revolution of 1830, but it was only in the course of the upheavals of 1848 that it became truly continental in scope. The barricade's diffusion was aided by the circulation of students, political refugees, and itinerant workers through the French capital, where many gained first-hand experience of one or another tactics of Parisian insurrection. The French Revolution of 1848 sparked a revolutionary wave across Europe from 1848 to 1849, which became known as the 'Springtime of the Peoples' and the 'Springtime of Nations.' Working-class people and the continent's bourgeoisie participated in mass demonstrations against their own autocratic governments, periodically forming citizen militias and constructing barricades in key urban centers throughout Europe. During this period, the barricade emerged as a powerful artifact of urban unrest and figured prominently in popular struggles against European monarchies that continued into the late 19th century. As Dennis Bos indicates:

"News of the successful rising in Paris in February 1848 was followed by the building of barricades in capital cities across Europe. Revolutionary claims were underscored by the first-time appearance of barricades in such widely scattered places as Berlin, Frankfurt and Dresden, Vienna, Milan and Naples, Krakow, Prague and Budapest."

==== Milan ====
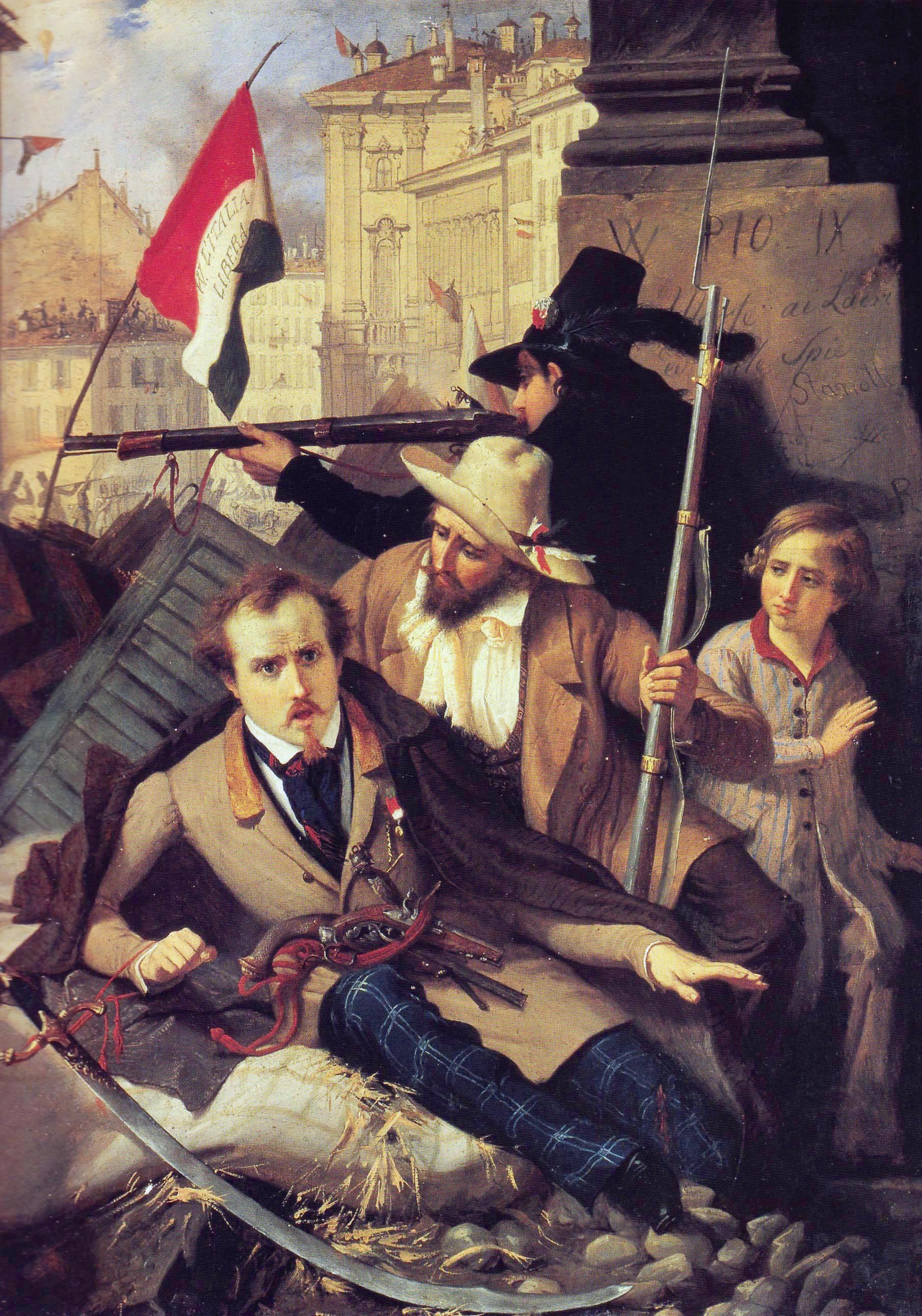
Baldassare Verazzi, Episodio delle cinque giornate (1886)

The Kingdom of Lombardy-Venetia, a constituent crown land of the Austrian Empire, existed from its establishment in 1815 until the beginning of the "Springtime of Nations" in 1848. On March 18, 1848, citizens of Milan rebelled against Austro-Hungarian rule for five continuous days, an event which later became known as the Five Days of Milan. During that period, insurgents constructed an estimated 1,700 barricades, dividing the city into defensible segments and functionally restricting the mobility of Austrian infantry, artillery, and cavalry. This fragmentation of Austrian troops enabled civilians to coordinate attacks from sheltered positions, serving to gradually undermine the Austrian army's control over the city. Through the construction of barricades, insurgents made it untenable for the Austrian army to remain in Milan, directly resulting in the withdrawal of approximately 12,000 Austrian troops from the city.

==== Berlin ====
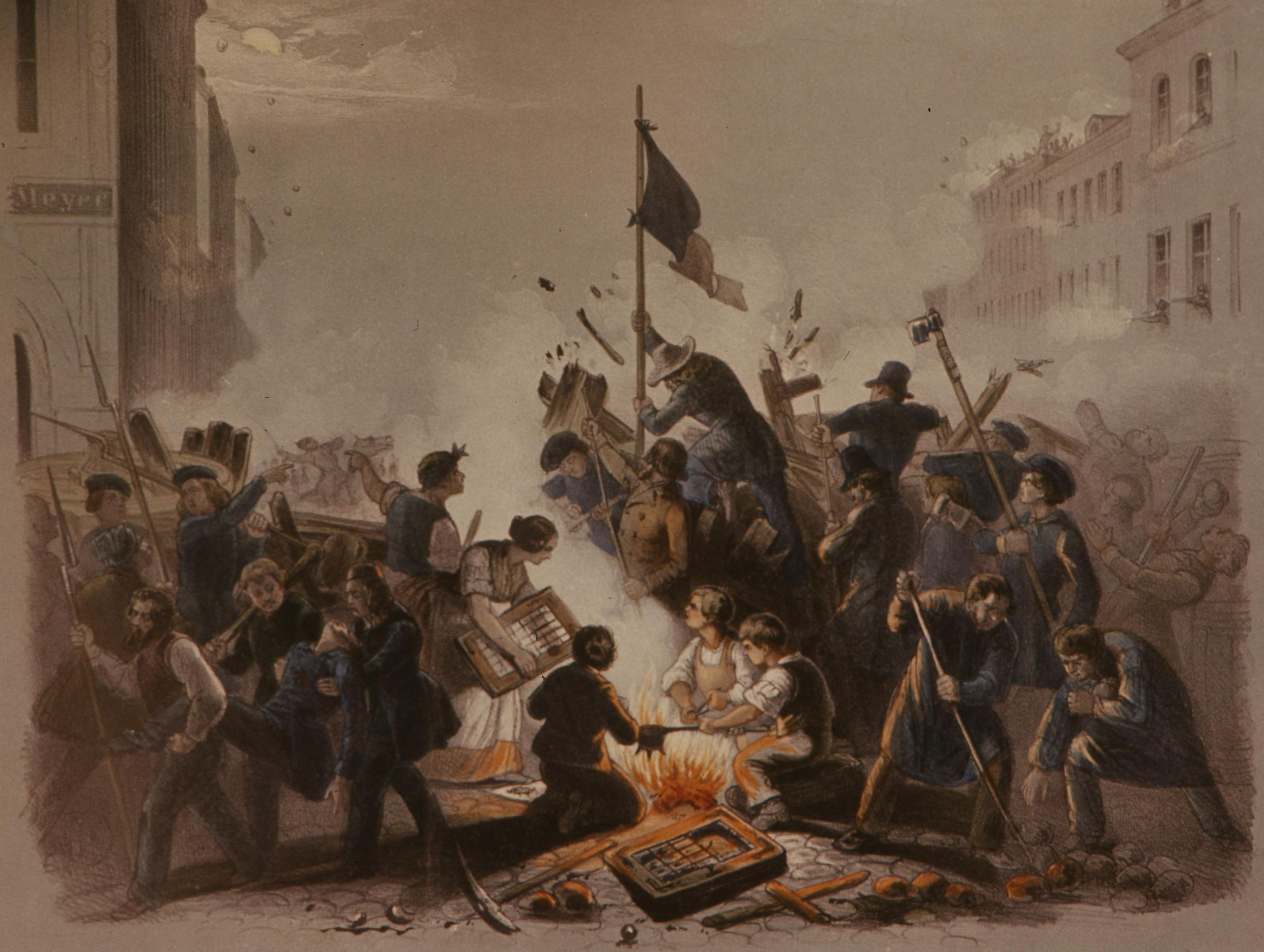
The barricades on Kronenstraße and Friedrichsstrasse on March 18, 1848, as seen by an eyewitness.

Inspired by the French Revolution of 1848, the Bürgerwehren took part in numerous confrontations with Prussian soldiers between March 13 and 17, 1848. However, the events of March 18 marked the beginning of a broader revolutionary movement. The Bürgerwehren erected a dense belt of barricades across Friedrichstadt, engaging in a series of battles with the Prussian army that later came to be known as the Märzrevolution. Barricades in Berlin were constructed to hold key tactical positions and control important neighborhoods, heavily restricting Prussian army movements. Barricades also empowered coordinated civilian resistance, forcing prolonged, negotiated standoffs with the Prussian army. In his firsthand account, August Brass describes being on the Kronenstraße and Friedrichstraße barricades, recalling:

"There, a lot of citizens equipped with rifles stood on the flat roof of one of the houses. From behind the barricade and from the windows of the other houses, guns were fired, too. And in the course of this attack, one of the general staff officers-we don't know whether it was the colonel himself or one of the battalion commanders was shot down from his horse when he attacked at the head of the columns. The repeated charges against these barricades were beaten back by the citizens with such energy that it instilled respect and admiration in the brave troops."

==== Vienna ====
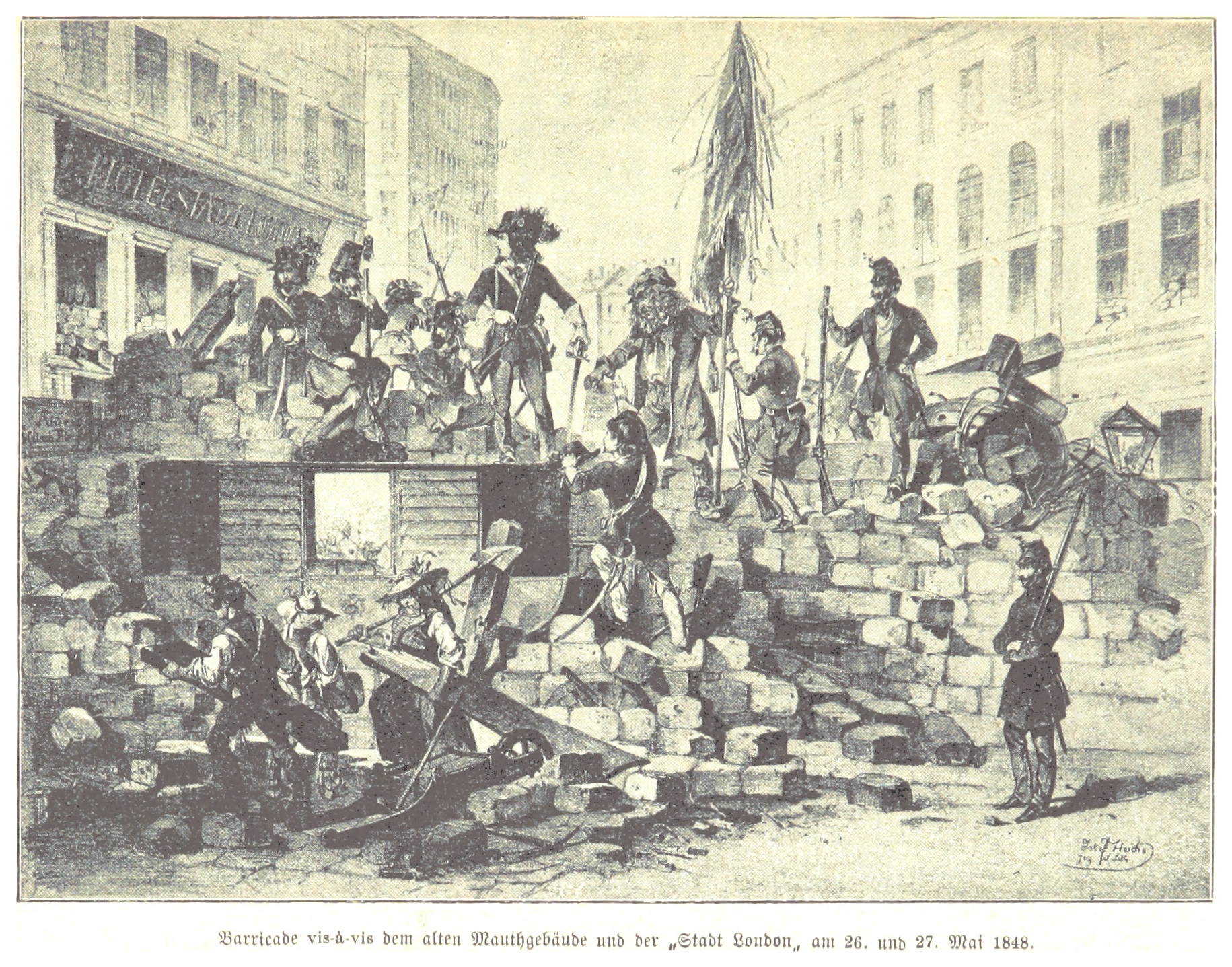
The Akademische Legion on barricades near the old toll building in Postgasse during the 1848 revolution in Vienna, 19th-century lithograph by Maximilian Bach

On March 13, 1848, the city of Vienna rebelled against the conservative policies of Emperor Ferdinand I, with citizens calling for liberal reforms. The Akademische Legion and other groups constructed barricades throughout the city, deliberately surrounding major government buildings including Rathausplatz, Taborstraße, and the Hofburg. These barricades shifted the balance of power so that, rather than suppress the rebellion, the Habsburg government was forced to negotiate with its citizens. As a result of these negotiations, Emperor Ferdinand I granted his citizens limited liberal concessions, resulting in a temporary pause to the rebellion.

=== Barricade in anti-colonial struggles: India and China ===
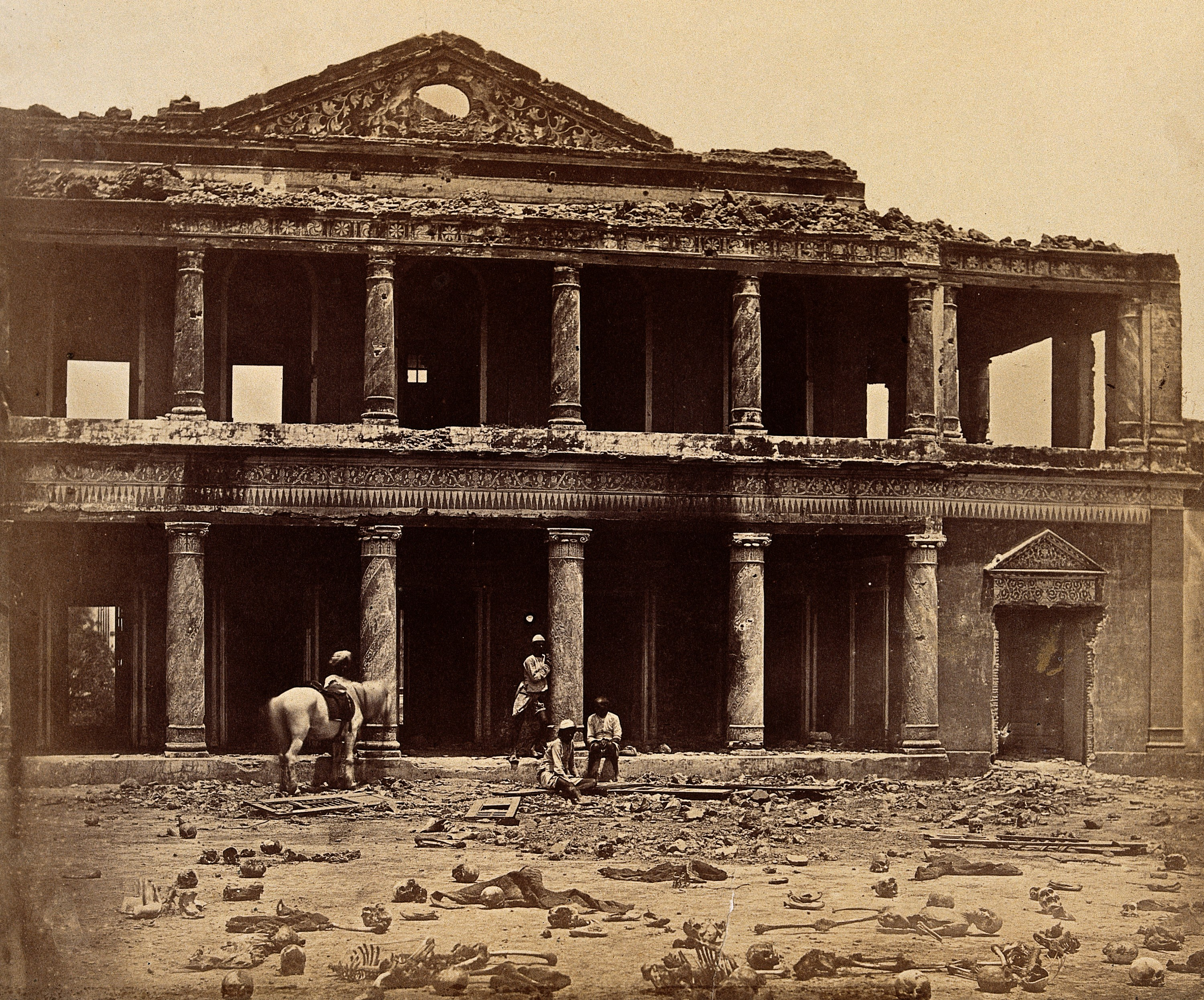
The Sikandar Bagh, garden outside of Lucknow, after the siege. The bones of Indian mutineers are arranged out front.

The Indian Rebellion of 1857 pitted Sepoys of the Bengal Army against the East India Company, which discriminated against and exploited the native troops. This revolt also witnessed the use of barricades. However, in this instance the barricades defied traditional class roles. They were used to protect the European colonial establishment rather than to aid popular resistance against it. The Sepoys besieged Lucknow in 1857, which was defended by a garrison of Company soldiers and their families. The British set up improvised barricades to defend the Lucknow Residency, attempting to convert the civilian housing for Europeans into a stronghold. At the time of siege, the walls of the barricades had only been half completed; in fact, one major wall contained little more than firewood hastily covered in a mound of dirt, which was inadvertently set on fire during the early days of siege. The defenders occupied the civilian buildings of the town and used the roofs to barrage the advancing sepoys with rifle fire from all angles. As British soldier L E Ruutz Rees frankly stated, "our defences were by no means strong, and that our chief ones rather consisted in the number of our guns and the quantity of our ammunition, than the strength of our earth-works and batteries". After 6 months, the siege ended when British relief forces routed the rebel warriors. After the event, depictions of it in British culture such as Tennyson's "Defense of Lucknow" allowed the U.K. to paint their colonialism as glorious and prideful for the country, rather than displaying the brutality of their imperial system.

As a result of the Opium Wars, China's long-held policy of isolationism had caved to a new race for trade exploitation there by the western powers, bringing wanton economic disruption. In 1899, major famine caused by drought further increased tensions, and the Boxer movement emerged as a radical anti-foreign response to the regions' struggles. The Boxers besieged the Diplomatic legations in Beijing, where the European ambassadors to China resided. The legations had high walls surrounding them, affording the Western forces relative safety from the advances of the Boxers. As a result, the Boxers built an improvised mobile barricade which allowed them to advance towards the walls without being cut down by an American enfilade. The Boxer barricade stretched up to the American wall, connecting with a tower that breached it. According to Nigel Oliphant, British diplomat in Beijing, "The tower was so close that one could touch it with a stick from the south end of the American barricade, and six Chinese with rifles could have commanded the place and killed everyone in it." However, a surprise attack led by British and American forces destroyed the tower and ended the use of barricades in the conflict. Eventually, European coalition forces from Tianjin reached the city and defeated the Boxer resistance. Nevertheless, this case shows that, by 1900, the barricade was already established as an artefact of urban revolutionary struggle throughout the globe.

=== Barricade as revolutionary emblem ===
Delacroix, Liberty Leading the People (1830)

In nineteenth-century France, the barricade served not only as a tactical device, but also as a potent visual symbol of popular power during periods of revolutionary unrest. The July Revolution of 1830 established the barricade's prominence in visual culture, most notably in Eugène Delacroix's Liberty Leading the People (1830), which portrayed it as a site of unity and heroism. Later depictions, such as Honoré Daumier's lithographs of the 1848 uprisings, shifted this imagery toward disillusionment, reflecting the fatigue and hardship of rebellion. In Victor Hugo's 1862 novel, Les Misérables, the barricade appears as both a physical site of combat and a literary metaphor for moral struggle. By the time of the Paris Commune (1871), early photography introduced a new form of representation. Photographs of ruined barricades and destroyed streets circulated internationally, turning these short-lived structures into long-lasting emblems of popular defiance of both popular defiance and state violence.

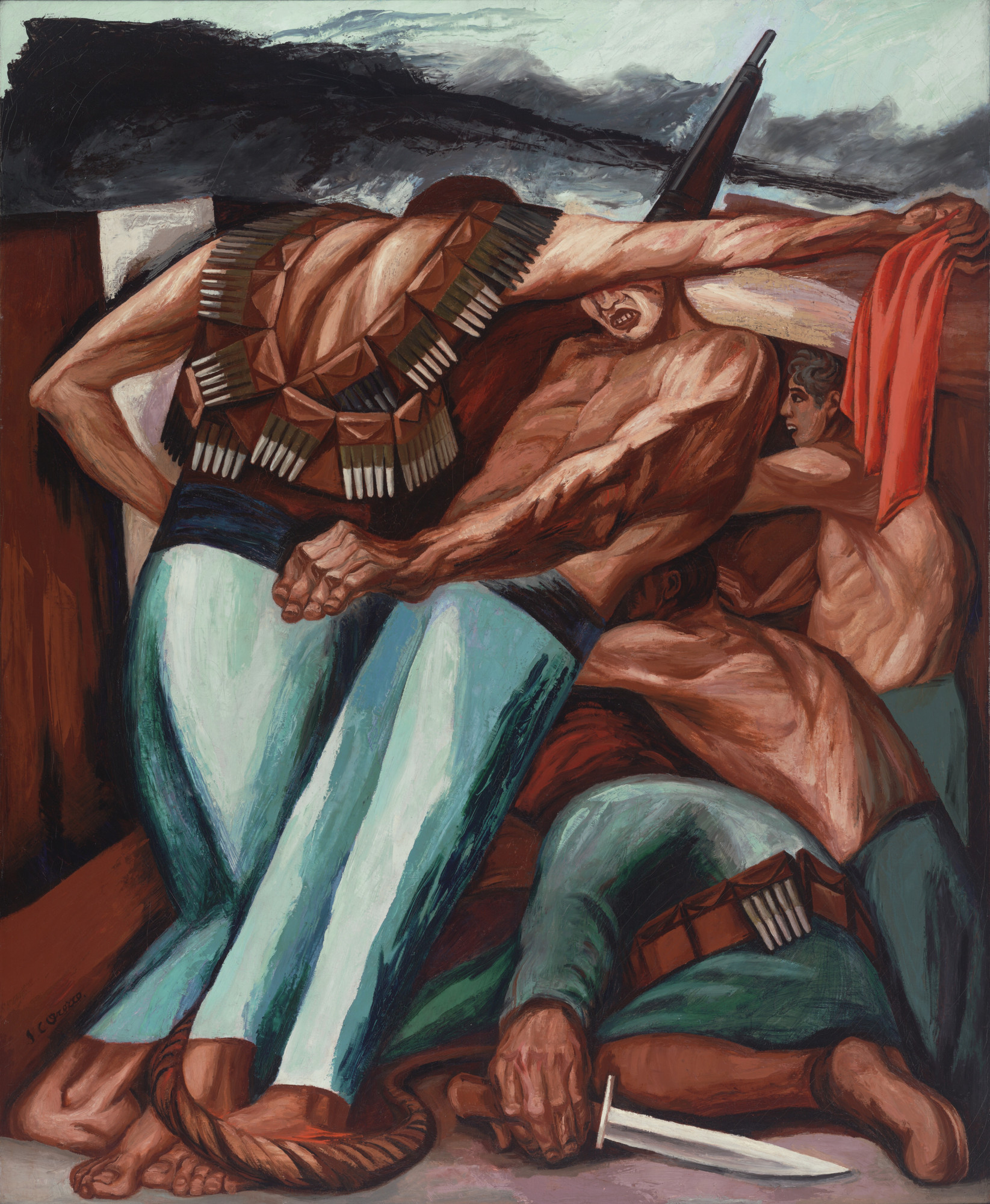
Jose Clemente Orozco. Barricade.

After 1917, Soviet artists and thinkers revived the barricade motif as an emblem of global liberation, extending its revolutionary import beyond Paris. This transnational adaptation aligns with historian Dennis Bos's argument that "[t]he image of the barricade was highly useful for illustrating that there was (or should be) a gap dividing the socialist party and people of a different persuasion, spatially distinguishing oppressors from revolutionaries, capitalists from workers."^{.} Barricade references appear in many colloquial expressions and are used, often metaphorically, in poems and songs celebrating radical social movements. Ivan Vladimirov depicted barricades in scenes of the Russian Revolution to show ordinary Petrograd residents transforming their city streets into sites of intense turmoil and urban conflict. José Clemente Orozco's muralistic works during the Mexican Revolution adapted the imagery of barricades to modern Latin American contexts, connecting them to broader themes of social conflict and collective action. The representation of the barricade as an emblem of insurrection or protest has continued into contemporary history. Police barricades turned into protest art in Philadelphia (Bar None, 2025) illustrate the continued resonance of the barricade as a visual and cultural form of public expression.

== Barricade in modern warfare ==
In the decades following the Age of Revolutions, increased nationalism, militarism, and political instability heightened tensions between European states that led to the outbreak of World War I. As the global conflict spread between 1914 and 1918, barricades were used to great effect in both the war itself and the revolutions that took place during and after it. The world wars of the twentieth century witnessed the emergence of several new types of barricades, including the trench, the rail barricade, the rubble barricade, and others.

=== World War I ===
==== The trench as barricade ====
Typical World War I trench fortified by sandbags, timber, and overhead cover.

During World War I, European armies developed trench systems as defensive barricades against new technology, such as rapid-fire machine guns. The trenches of World War I were vast underground defensive systems that stretched about 450 miles across the Western Front. The danger soldiers faced charging through heavy fire in no-man's-land between the Central and Allied powers led armies to construct trench lines that were roughly 4–6 feet wide and 8 feet deep. These trenches were often covered in barbed wire, sandbags, and overhead cover, with their layout described by a British officer as "elbowed, zig-zagged". Some scholars have argued that World War I trenches were barricades because their zig-zag structure and defensive obstacles create protected barriers. Others have suggested that trenches were responses to the battle environment rather than conventional defensive barricades, and would be better characterized as defensive breastworks.

==== Insurgent barricades during WWI: Dublin ====
The Easter Rising was a 1916 revolt in Dublin waged by Irish Republicans fighting against British occupation. Irish Republicans achieved limited success during the revolt, utilizing barricades to hinder the British advance into parts of the city held by Irish forces. These barricades were built from stolen cars, trolleys, and materials from nearby buildings, including bricks, wood, and flour sacks. The Irish barricades faced threats from both British forces and other Dublin residents, who sometimes tried to tear them down. On occasion, Irish fighters beat residents with the butts of their rifles to protect the barricades from sustaining damage. One especially violent confrontation near the Shelbourne Hotel saw a young Irish Republican shoot an "elderly man who had been warned several times to stop trying to remove his lorry from a barricade". The Dublin barricades had limited success, with Peadar Kearney, co-founder of the Irish Volunteers, calling them "a futile business". Most barricaded positions were abandoned in favor of using buildings as defensive positions. Although the Easter Rising and its barricades were a tactical failure, the image of an Irish Republican fighting back against the oppression of the British Army continued onward, motivating in part the subsequent Irish War of Independence.

==== Revolutionary barricades at the close of WWI: USSR and Germany ====
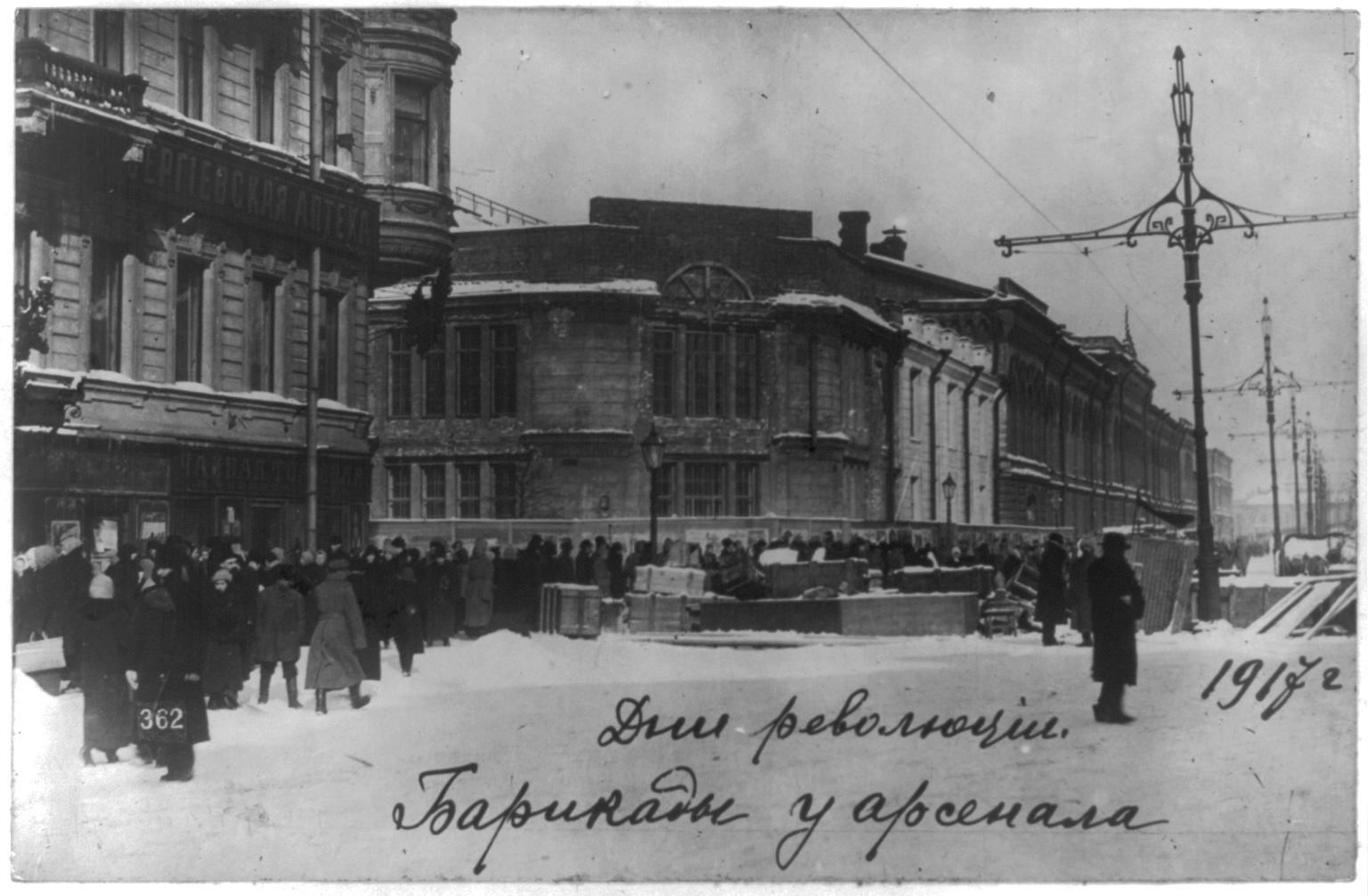
People in front of a barricade on a street in Saint Petersburg during the February Revolution

The Russian Revolution was a period of social and political change that began as a bourgeois-democratic revolution in February 1917 that abolished the Russian monarchy and culminated in a Marxist revolution in October. It established the Soviet Union as the first proletarian state. Revolutionaries and counterrevolutionaries alike used barricades throughout this period. Near the start of the February Revolution, on 25 February Old Style (10 March New Style), revolutionaries on the Vyborg Side of Petrograd (now Saint Petersburg) established a "liberated section" erecting barricades made from tram wagons and telephone poles. Inside the liberated section, the Bolshevik Petersburg Committee distributed revolutionary leaflets declaring that workers "[demanded] the destruction of the autocratic regime, the perpetrator of spilling the blood of the people, the perpetrator of hunger, who [was] bringing [their] wives, children, mothers and brothers to ruin" and advised revolutionaries to build more barricades. On 27 February O.S. (12 March N.S.) at 1:00 a.m., armed defectors from the Petrograd garrison marched on the Trinity Bridge and erected barricades there. During the dual power period, Soviet rail workers built barricades made from torn-up train tracks from 28 to 31 August O.S. (10–13 September N.S.) to hinder troop transportation ordered by General Lavr Kornilov as part of the Kornilov affair. Following the outbreak of the October Revolution, Russian Republic soldiers barricaded themselves inside the Saratov city council building against Soviet forces for three days, using boxes of quinces as the barricades' building materials.

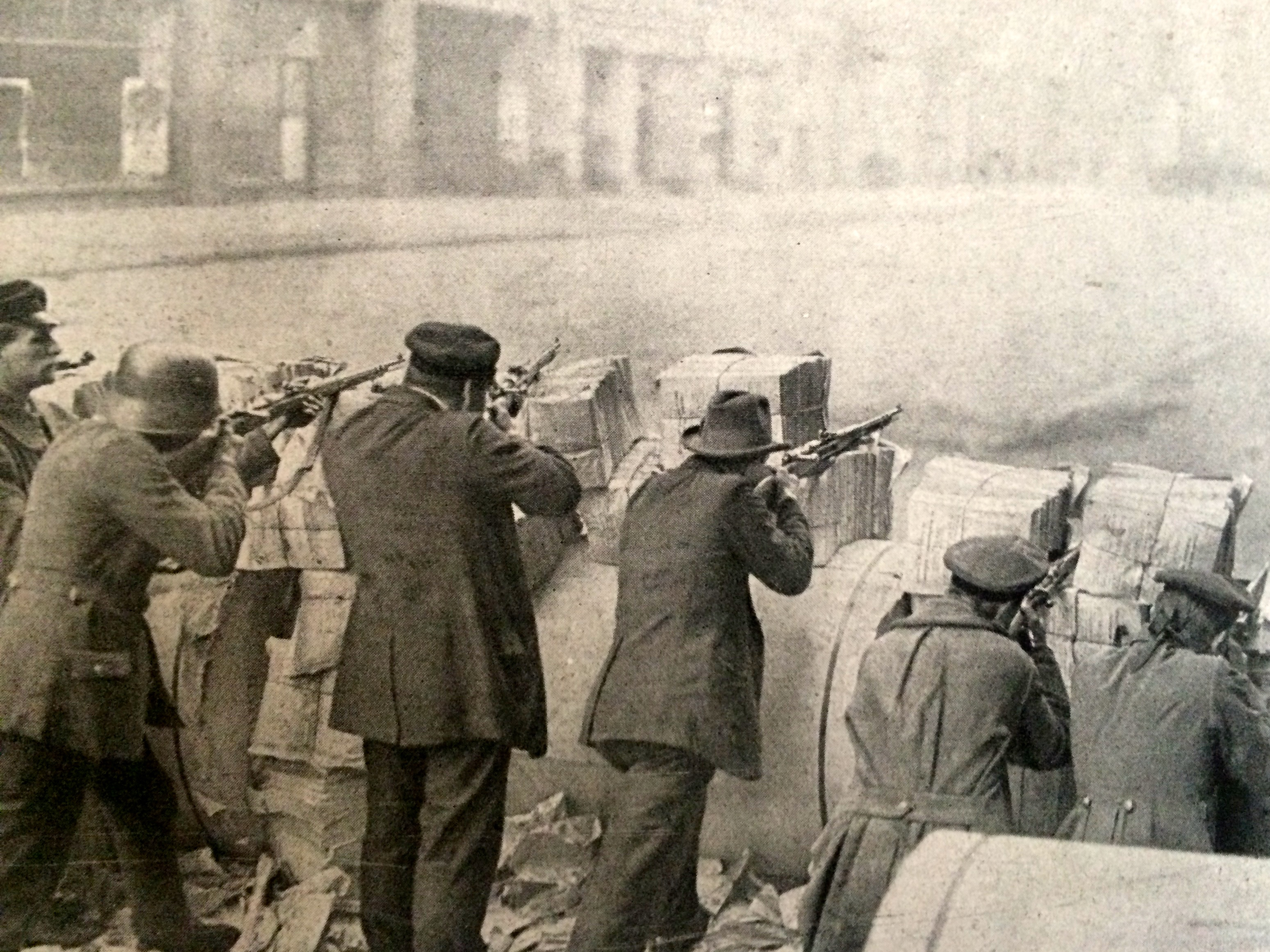
Spartacus Uprising Barricade

The Russian Revolution's success and Germany's defeat in World War I inspired the German Revolution of 1918–1919, a popular uprising that contributed to the abdication of Emperor Wilhelm II, the establishment of the Weimar Republic, and long-lasting political instability in Germany. The Kiel mutiny incited the revolution on 3 November. Left-wing groups like the Spartacus League, the Social Democratic Party of Germany, the People's Navy Division, and others rose to prominence following the mutiny at Kiel. These armed groups often fought both the new Weimar Republic and one another. Weimar Republic soldiers surrounded the barricaded headquarters of the People's Navy Division, the Neuer Marstall, on 24 December to prevent the group from advancing revolutionary intentions. Citizens paid great attention to the affair, and "[t]housands of working people came out to support the sailors barricaded in the Marstall." During the Spartacus uprising in January 1919, multiple clashes between the Spartacus League and the paramilitary group the Freikorps broke out on the barricaded streets of Berlin.

=== World War II ===
==== Barricades during the Siege of Stalingrad and the Fall of Berlin ====
The Battle of Stalingrad lasted from 23 August 1942 to 2 February 1943, during which the German army laid siege to the Soviet city of Stalingrad. In the early part of the battle, barricades became a ubiquitous feature of Stalingrad's landscape. German bombardment of Stalingrad reduced the city to rubble. Civilians and Red Army soldiers built a complex network of barricades from the collapsed buildings, vehicles, and industrial debris. This carefully organized network of barricades played a significant role in the Red Army's victory at Stalingrad. The barricades hindered Germany's armored advances, created chokepoints, funneled advancing troops into vulnerable positions, and sheltered the Soviet defenders. The barricades served as more than a tactical construction for the Soviets; they were part of daily life within the city. Civilians established food distribution, medical aid, and evacuation routes with barricades in mind. The barricades restructured Stalingrad, transforming the city into a dense maze with a brand new functional urban grid. The Soviet victory at Stalingrad came when Soviet forces encircled the German 6th Army and trapped them inside the city. The 6th Army, unfamiliar with Stalingrad's barricaded terrain, suffered heavy casualties until the last soldiers surrendered on 2 February 1943.

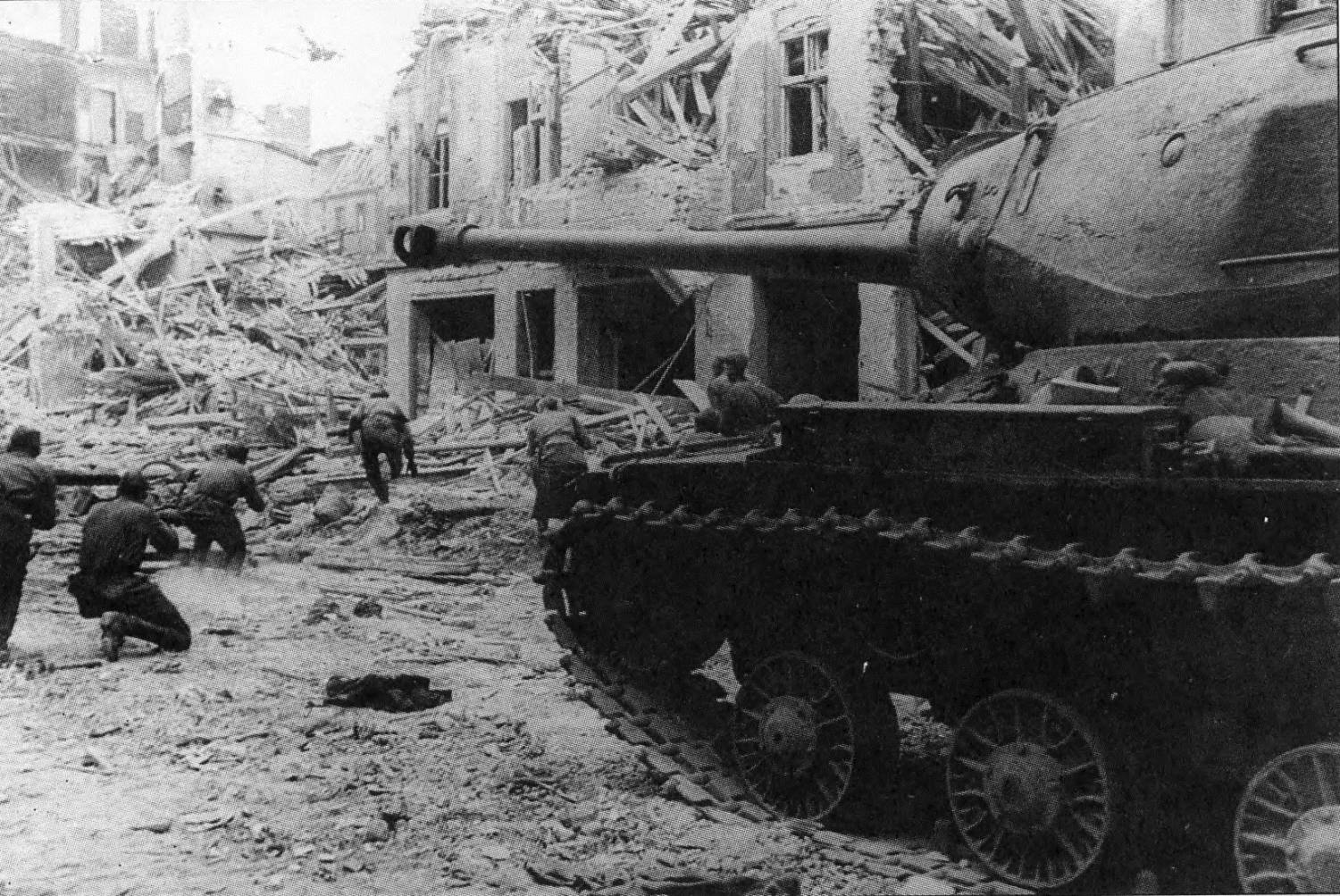
IS-2 tank supports infantry in the streets of Berlin. April 1945 (Public Domain of Russia)

During the Battle of Berlin, also known as the Fall of Berlin, the construction of barricades became an organized city-wide part of Nazi Germany's urban defense strategy for the capital. The battle, which lasted from 16 April 1945 to 2 May 1945, started with the Red Army's encirclement of the capital. As forces of the USSR began to make their way through the outskirts of the city, Nazi authorities ordered all Berliners, both soldiers and civilians, to construct barricades across key roadways. Indeed, Antony Beevor writes, "Berliners were ordered to build barricades in every main street." These were erected from vehicles, furniture, and rubble from ruined buildings. The barricades weren't effective in preventing the rapid soviet advance. Most of them were "smashed aside by tanks or simply bypassed". To the contrary, the barricades constructed in Berlin actually prevented many civilians, trapped in isolated pockets of urban ruin, from gaining access to food and water during the final weeks of the war. After Berlin's surrender, Soviet and Allied troops cleared the barricaded streets to begin reconstruction and offer aid.

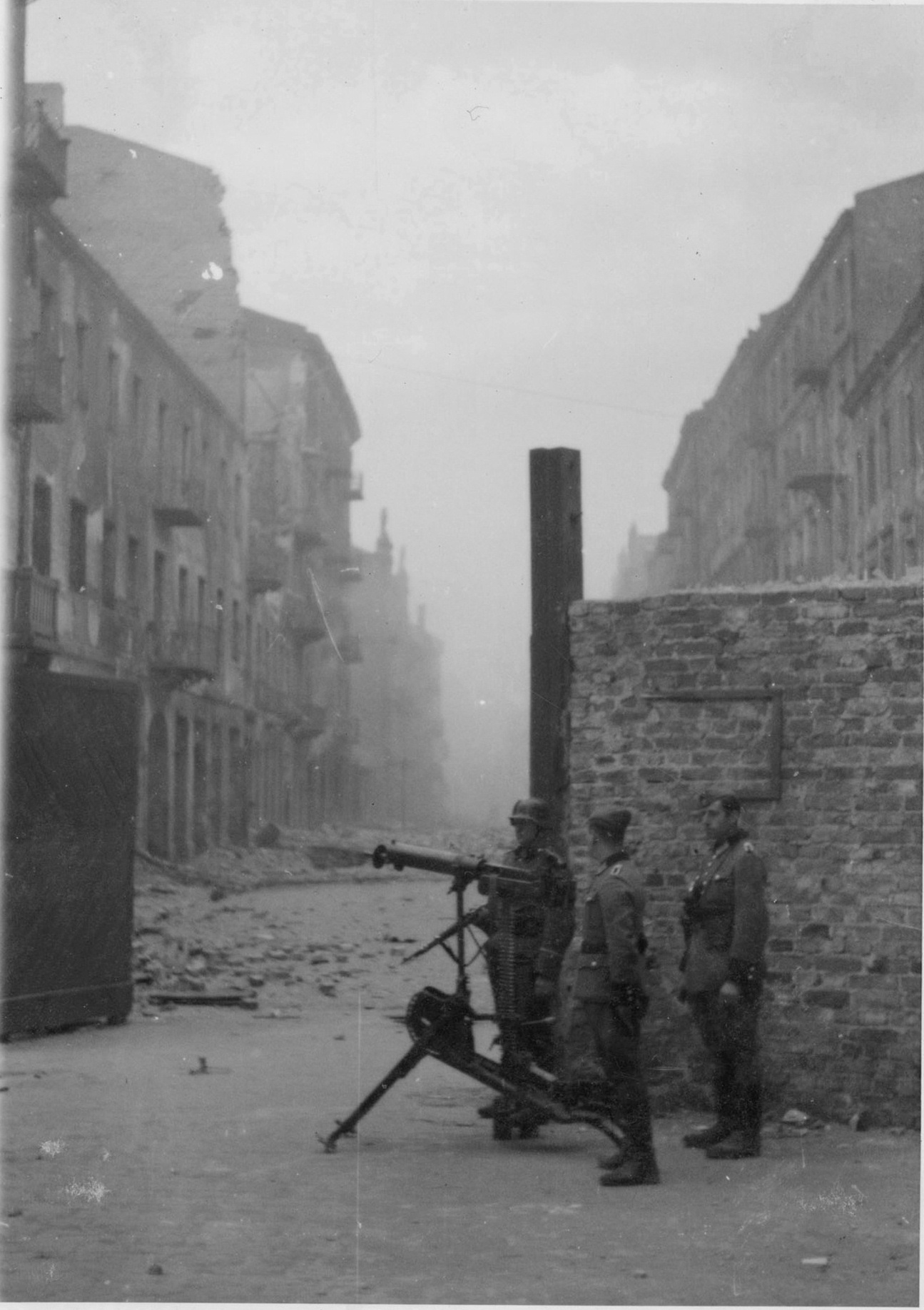
German Sentries. Warsaw Ghetto Uprising. 1943

==== Barricade during the Warsaw Ghetto Uprising ====
The Warsaw Ghetto Uprising in 1943 was the first large-scale urban revolt against Nazi Germany during World War II. The German Civil Occupation Authority of the General Government began the construction of the Warsaw Ghetto in April 1941, transporting 20,000 Jews into the Warsaw Ghetto by November 4. The number reached 460,000 later that year. The concentration of the Jewish population in the closed ghetto of Warsaw was meant to be a preparation for the deportation of the victims to extermination camps. Two main rebel groups formed shortly after the German conquest of Warsaw: the Jewish Fighting Organization (ŻOB) and the Jewish Military Organization (ŻZW). The Jewish fighting groups made extensive use of underground hideouts, bunkers, tunnels, and sewer systems within the urban landscape to organize resistance against the Germans. One of the main strategies was to launch discrete attacks on the Germans and then retreat to the underground bunkers they had built for safety. Controlling the attics and rooftops of the ghetto by forming barricades on them was also a preferred tactic. A ZOB fighter recalled that "They [the Z ̇ OB] used to rip off the stairs so that if someone wanted to come up high, he had to sort of crawl up the concrete instead of walk on the stairs." During its First Battle, which was triggered by the second deportation of Warsaw Jews to Treblinka, the ŻOB decided to move to an indoor defense of civilians, fighting Nazis in the dark. This skillful utilization of the indoor landscape resulted in the Nazis temporarily giving up on deporting 3000 more Jews. The Nazis changed their tactics after they realized that they weren't able to infiltrate the network of underground systems and barricades, then proceeded to burn and destroy the entirety of the Warsaw Ghetto.

== Postwar barricade ==
During the global political unrest that followed World War II, the use of barricades was common. Barricades became a core part of anti-colonial struggles in Palestine (1948), Algeria (1954-1962), and South Africa (1976). In addition, barricades were everywhere in major urban protests in Paris and Chicago in 1968, and in Los Angeles in 1992. Lastly, barricades were a characteristic of Cold War-era uprisings in Hungary (1956) and Czechoslovakia (1968). In many of these cases, civilians used barricades not only to control the streets, but, in some instances, to challenge or even oppose the authority of the state.

=== Barricade in decolonization struggles ===
==== Palestine ====
During the final years of the British Mandate over Palestine (1920-1948), the cities of Jerusalem and Haifa contained fortified zones known as Bevingrads, a term that condensed the name of Britain's foreign minister, Ernest Bevin, with the besieged city of Stalingrad during WWII. Jerusalem's 'Bevingrad' included a barricaded district that encompassed "...the central post office, the 'Russian Compound' police fort and court buildings, as well as the Notre Dame monastery—French Hospital complex overlooking the Old City's northern wall, the YMCA and the King David Hotel." The Haganah, a Zionist militia, later captured these strongpoints during Operation Pitchfork. This signaled the end of British control over the city. The Bevingrads were not the only barricaded areas in urban Palestine during the 1948 War. Walid Khalidi highlights that Palestinian civilians built improvised defenses to protect their homes as the fighting between Zionist and Palestinian militias intensified. In particular, barricades in Jerusalem's neighborhoods represented attempts at civilian self-organization as the authority of the mandatory power collapsed at the beginning of the 1948 Palestine War.

==== Algeria ====
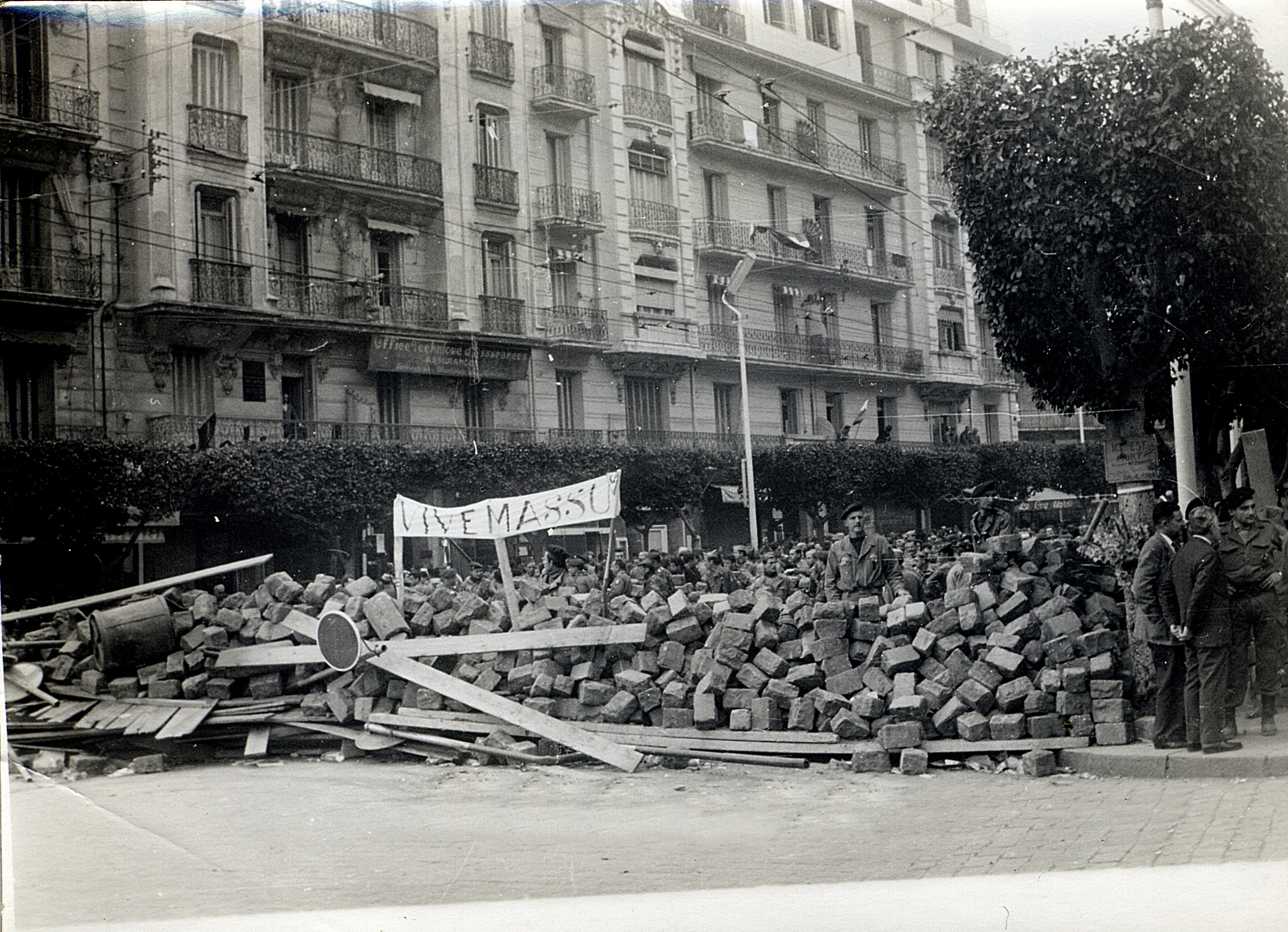
Barricade in Algiers. The banner reads: "Vive Massu" (Long live Massu).

During the Algerian War of Independence against France (1954-1962), barricades were used by both sides in the conflict. French troops constructed barriers and checkpoints across Algiers to isolate the Casbah, and to restrict movement by the Front de Libération Nationale (FLN). This strategy followed counter-insurgency training at a military base in Arzew that emphasized "psychological warfare, the destruction of the rebel infrastructure, and winning back the population for France." These fortifications created zones of control that fragmented the city along racial/ethnic and political lines. Physical barriers and checkpoints divided colonial and nationalist zones. By 1960, European settlers in Algeria, known as pieds-noirs, erected their own barricades in the city of Algiers to protest President Charles de Gaulle's acceptance of Algerian self-determination. Several historians have interpreted these settler barricades as a desperate attempt to preserve France's sovereignty over Algeria as independence became inevitable.

==== South Africa ====
In the fight against apartheid in South Africa, resistance was mainly carried out by the African National Congress (ANC), the Pan Africanist Congress (PAC), and the South African Communist Party (SACP). In 1976, when the apartheid government put into effect new Afrikaans-language education mandates, it directly heightened tensions in Black townships. This further sparked the Soweto Uprising. During the uprising, students and young activists used tactics of urban enclosure, building barricades out of rubble, furniture, and burned-out vehicles to block police entry into townships. These barriers turned into powerful symbols of resistance and solidarity in the successful struggle against apartheid.

=== Barricade in postwar European and American politics ===
==== Barricade in 1968: Paris and Chicago ====
The protests in Paris of May 68 showcased barricades that were largely makeshift, made of rubble and any other scraps protesters could gather. Scholars view the barricades of the events of May 68 as a "cultural rebellion" of Parisian students against the French government, during which student protesters called for "democratic decision-making and participation". The Parisian students' identification with the Vietnamese people at the time of the Vietnam War further intensified these protests.

Barricades in the United States also reflected political tensions between citizens and the state. Throughout the Civil Rights era in the 1960s policing became more aggressive in African American communities, sparking considerable social unrest within them. In Decatur, Illinois, aggrieved African American protesters used cars as barricades to trap a police car after an officer had used excessive force to arrest African American teens the previous night. Following the assassination of Martin Luther King Jr. in April 1968, more "rebellions" across the nation ensued, according to historian Elizabeth Hinton. This, combined with opposition to United States involvement in the Vietnam War, led to widespread protests during the 1968 Democratic National Convention. In these protests, both protesters and the Chicago police used barricades. While protesters used barricades to protect themselves, police erected barricades to "deny access to certain areas" near the convention.

Barricade in 1992: Los Angeles

A generation later, a jury acquitted three Los Angeles Police Department officers of beating an unarmed African-American motorist named Rodney King, sparking the 1992 Los Angeles riots. Scholars such as Hinton view these uprisings as "a reaction to systemic injustice rather than a direct response to police violence", with the officers' acquittals being "just the trigger". Studies indicate that areas of Los Angeles that saw higher rates of immigration and poverty prior to the riots also experienced higher rates of violence and barricade use during the violence. Amid the riots, the LAPD set defensive perimeters around wealthy neighborhoods within the city, leaving areas like Koreatown defenseless.

==== Barricade and the Cold War: Budapest and Prague ====
Following World War II, Eastern Europe fell under the hegemony of the Soviet Union in a geopolitical contest with the U.S. known as the Cold War. This struggle soon defined the postwar order. The Iron Curtain became the common name of this divide, marking the boundary between Soviet-dominated Eastern Europe and the West. This arrangement was further set into place through the Warsaw Pact, which bound Eastern European nations into a Soviet-led military and political bloc. Hungary was part of the Soviet bloc. However, in 1956 the Hungarian Uprising erupted in protest against the country's subordination to the Soviet Union. The rebellion was defined by the rapid construction of barricades across Budapest, as civilians piled furniture, buses, stones and debris into positions to block Soviet military vehicles and defend key intersections. Although the rebellion was eventually suppressed, these improvised barricades were at the core of the revolution's urban warfare, temporarily enabling zones of control, and symbolizing an attempt to reclaim the city from Soviet rule.

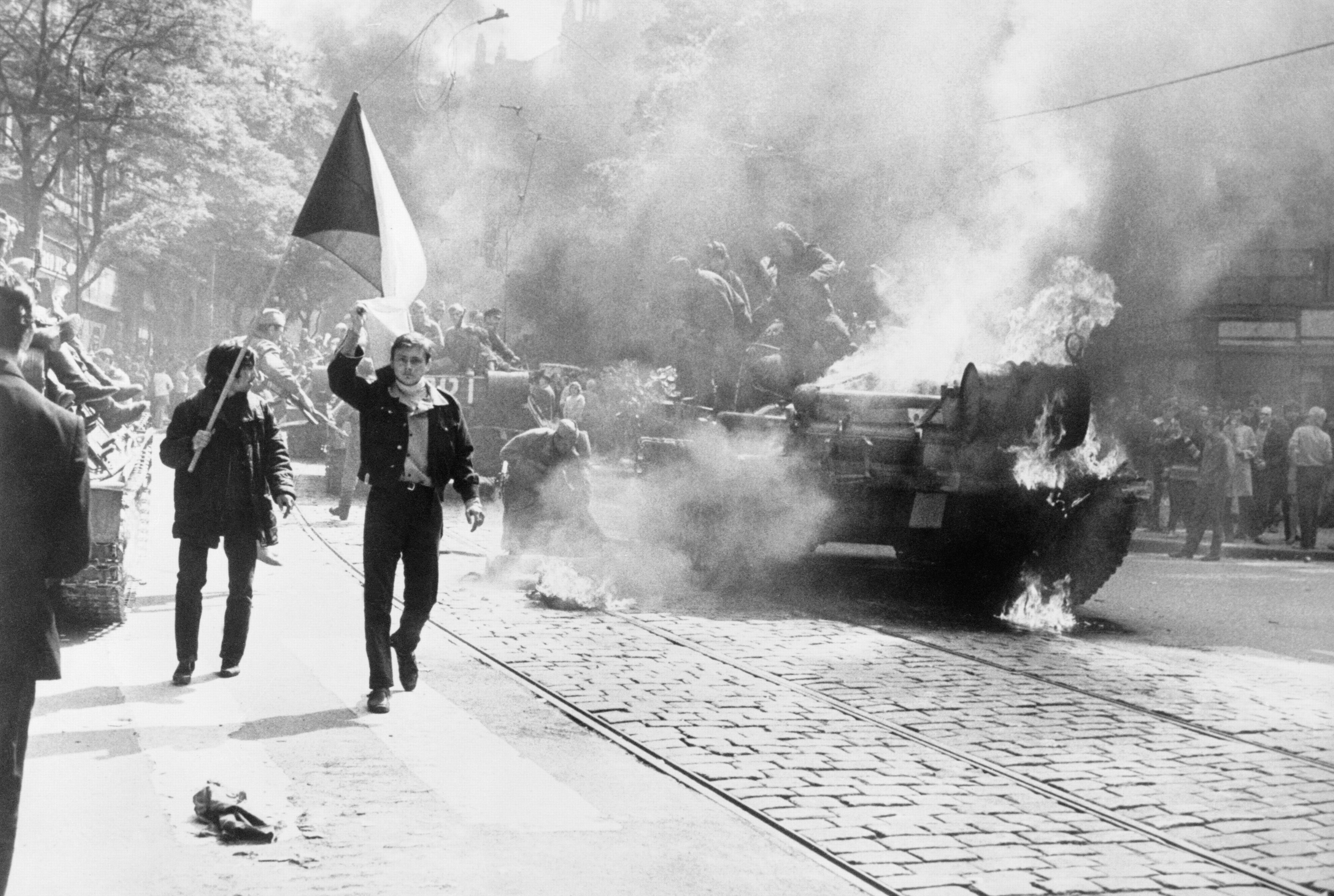
Soviet tank stopped by barricade in Prague Spring, 1968 now burning. Photo from "CIA Analysis of the Warsaw Pact Forces: The Importance of Clandestine Reporting"

Similarly, during the Prague Spring that took place in Czechoslovakia in 1968 the emergence of a reform movement there occasioned a Soviet-led invasion. This, in turn, prompted residents to create barricades in Prague's streets, using cars, construction materials and trolleybuses, to slow the soviet's progress and interfere with the movement of tanks. According to one account, "the most serious violence of occupation occurred on the first day, when people built barricades and set fire to at least three Russian tanks." Together, these uprisings illustrate how barricades persisted as strong instruments of popular resistance behind the Iron Curtain during the Cold War.

== Barricade in contemporary history ==
Contemporary militaries have increasingly treated barricades as technical problems to be solved through engineering and doctrine. In asymmetric conflicts, technologically advanced forces, including the United States Army and the Israel Defense Forces (IDF), have developed precision-guided munitions, infantry weapons systems, and bespoke field tactics to destroy or bypass improvised fortified positions. Militaries have also used crowd control devices to contend with both protest and counter insurgency. After the September 11 attacks, planners in the United States began to merge military defense logics with urban planning, and barricades became commonplace. In the twenty-first century, barricades have also evolved from objects employed for securitization to contested sites of civic resistance.

=== Securitization of the barricade since 9/11 ===
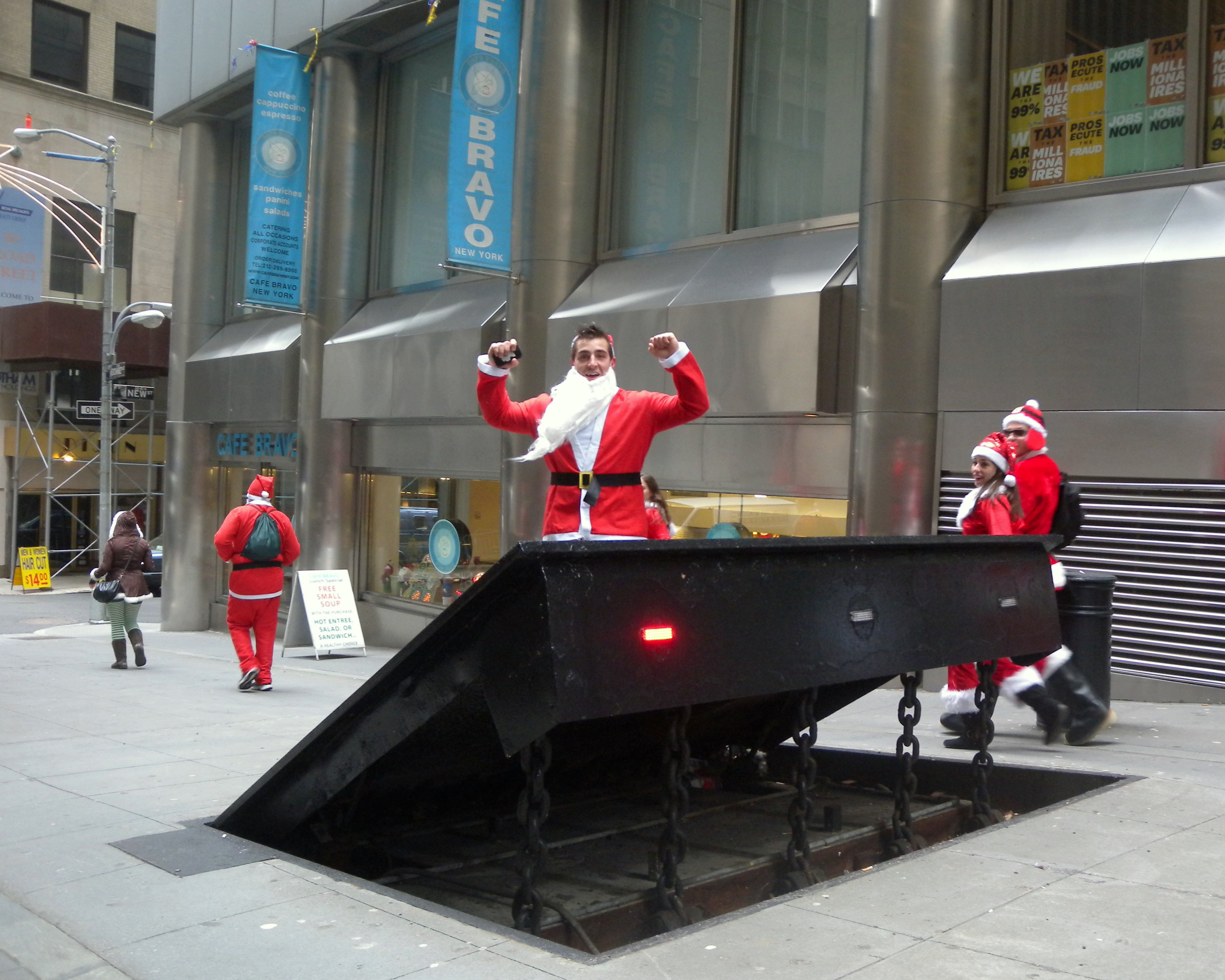
Hydraulic barricade, in 2011, defends Wall Street, in New York City

Since 9/11 cities worldwide have adopted and embedded barricade technologies into the public domain through design techniques that protect and regulate movement and activity in cities. Anti-vehicle barriers and retractable bollards have shifted from temporary emergency measures to permanent, universal design standards. This shift reflects a broader global process of securitization in which risk management principles and architectural defenses influence urban form. Yet even as these systems aim to safeguard populations, they also illustrate how securitization develops through institution-driven practices rather than broad ideological shifts. For example, after the 2007 Glasgow Airport attack, the U.K. Home Office adopted crash-rated bollards as part of long-term streetscape plans, embedding counterterror architecture into routine planning procedures. In Washington, D.C., the National Capital Planning Commission's post-9/11 Interagency Security Criteria formalized temporary barriers into standard perimeter rules across federal agencies. Gradually, these measures became permanent fixtures through repeated policy renewals and updated design guidelines. A Global Cultural Districts Network report surveys multiple international case studies illustrating how various forms of security "furniture" have been integrated into metropolitan environments, such as planters and removable barriers to mitigate vehicular threats. Fear-driven security measures have introduced securitized controls, as seen in London's ring of steel and the implementation of the extensive network of CCTV cameras, mitigating the threat of terrorism through constant surveillance. Prior to 9/11, barricades in the United States were typically used as temporary equipment for managing protests and controlling pedestrian traffic. As these post-9/11 barricades became normalized as features of urban design, their role expanded beyond counter-terror protection to include the regulation of public assembly. During the George Floyd protests, police departments in multiple cities used barricades to establish perimeters and organize the flow of crowds.

=== Militaries against the barricade ===
In contemporary history, militaries have treated barricades as tactical obstacles that need to be overcome to control an urban space. The 1968 Battle of Hue during the Vietnam War highlighted the difficulty of fighting house-to-house in cities with barricades and rubble. This prompted the development of new doctrines, such as FM 3-34.2 Combined-Arms Breaching Operations, to codify how United States infantry should function in urban environments. Mouse-holing, the practice of creating openings through interior walls to move between buildings, is another example of doctrinal adaptation for breaching. Similar ideas informed the Israel Defense Forces (IDF)'s tactic of "walking through walls", in which street-level barricades were rendered irrelevant by turning private interior spaces into corridors for troop movement. This tactic was used during the Second Intifada, particularly in the cities of Nablus and Jenin, during Operation Defensive Shield in April 2002 against Palestinian militants who had a constructed a defensive network of barricades to try and direct IDF troop movement and strike at it.

=== Barricade in contemporary protests in the U.S. ===
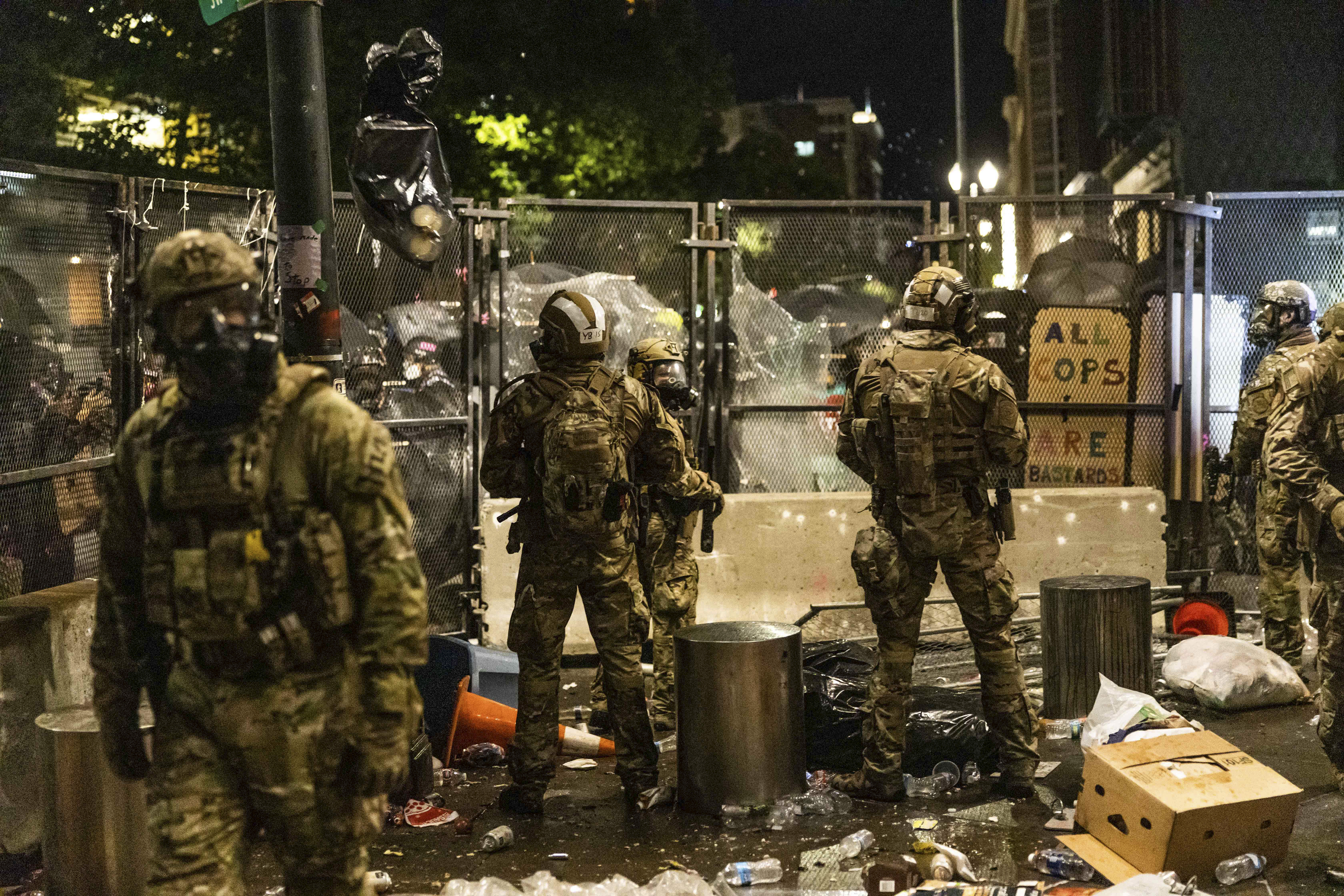
Fencing utilized as barricade during BLM protest

Barricades have become a common feature of many contemporary protests in the United States. During the 2020 George Floyd demonstrations, protestor-built barricades were erected to protect memorial sites and block police from entering areas like during the George Floyd Square occupied protest in Minneapolis. In this way, the square maintained a "cop-free four block zone" for over a year. In response to these types of spatial appropriations, police also used barricades and crowd control tactics such as kettling, a strategy where police box a group of people and contain them within a small, enclosed area to prevent protestors from leaving. Protestors in Minneapolis faced ultimate injury as "rubber bullets were fired at the crowd[s] indiscriminately," after which officers already surrounded protestors in a confined area of the street. Kettling is designed to maximize physical harm and prevent escape. Across major United States cities, barricades, both those built by protestors and those imposed by police to contain them, emerged as prominent features shaping sites of urban contestation. These barricade areas often appeared in neighborhoods with pervasive racial and socioeconomic inequality, where police interactions with residents, including the use of force, are more common. [6]

Portland Bicycle Protest

On January 6, 2021, rioters breached the United States Capitol after dismantling temporary federal barricades that had been erected around the building by Capitol police forces. The breach allowed the rioters to access restricted areas and attempt to interrupt the certification of the 2020 presidential election results. The event was "a broadcasted collapse of the United States government security" where the rules and measures designed to keep the Capitol building safe failed. In October 2025, in Portland, Oregon, a markedly different form of protest took place. Nude cyclists gathered by moving in masses rather than erecting barriers, thereby creating a form of a living barricade to oppose the deployment of the National Guard to the city. One participant described the demonstration as "quintessentially Portland," emphasizing the city's distinct style of activism.

== Gallery ==
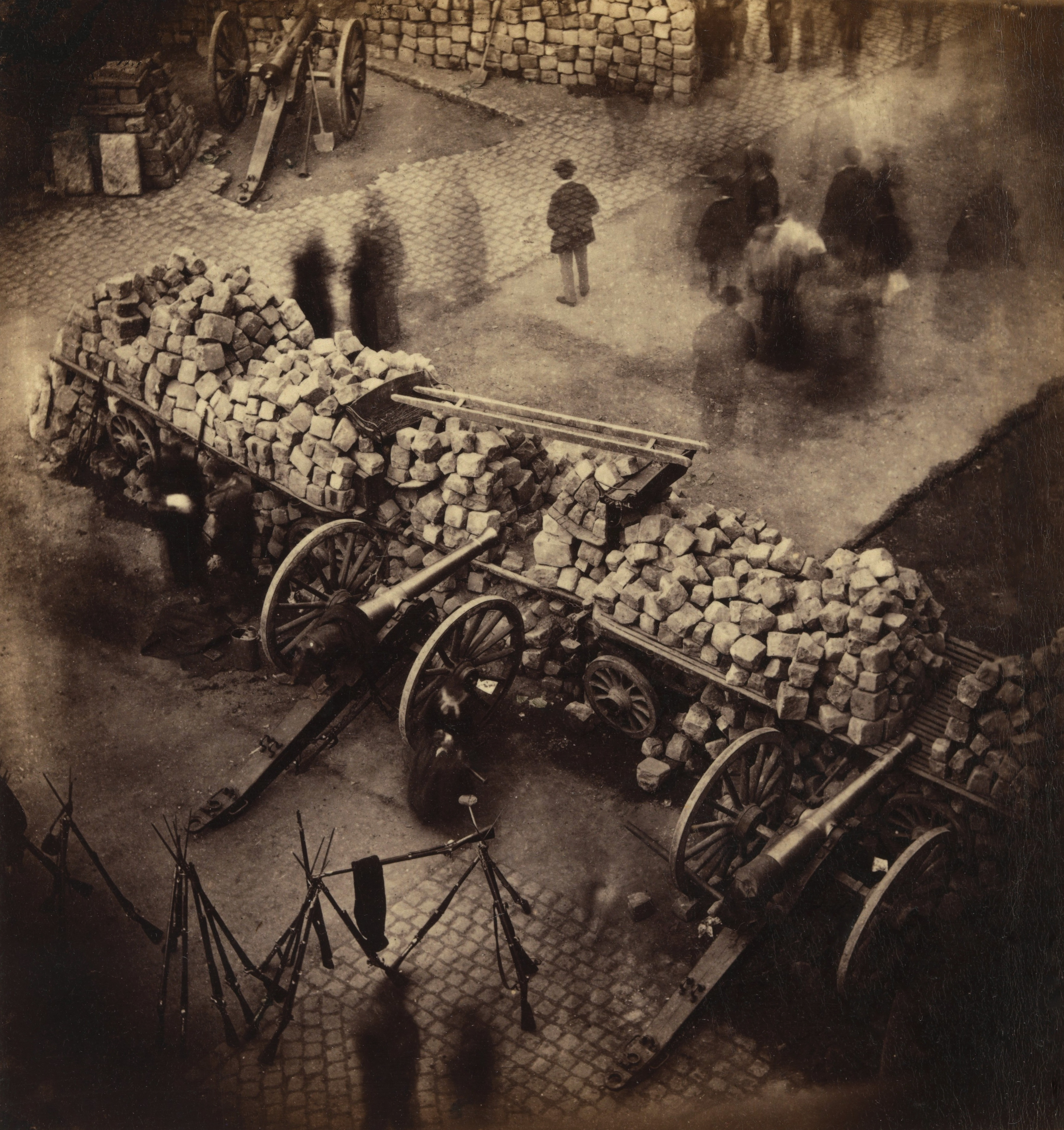
Paving blocks in a barricade, Paris 1871

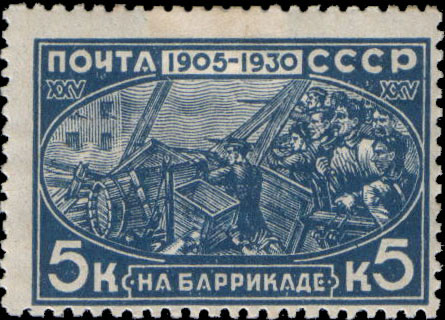
"At The Barricade": 1930 Soviet Union stamp commemorating the 1905 Russian Revolution

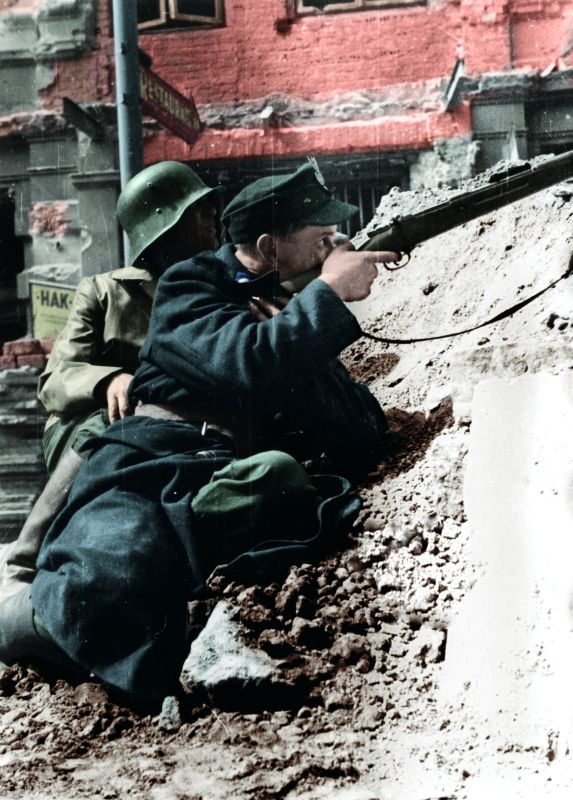
Earthen barricade during the Warsaw Uprising

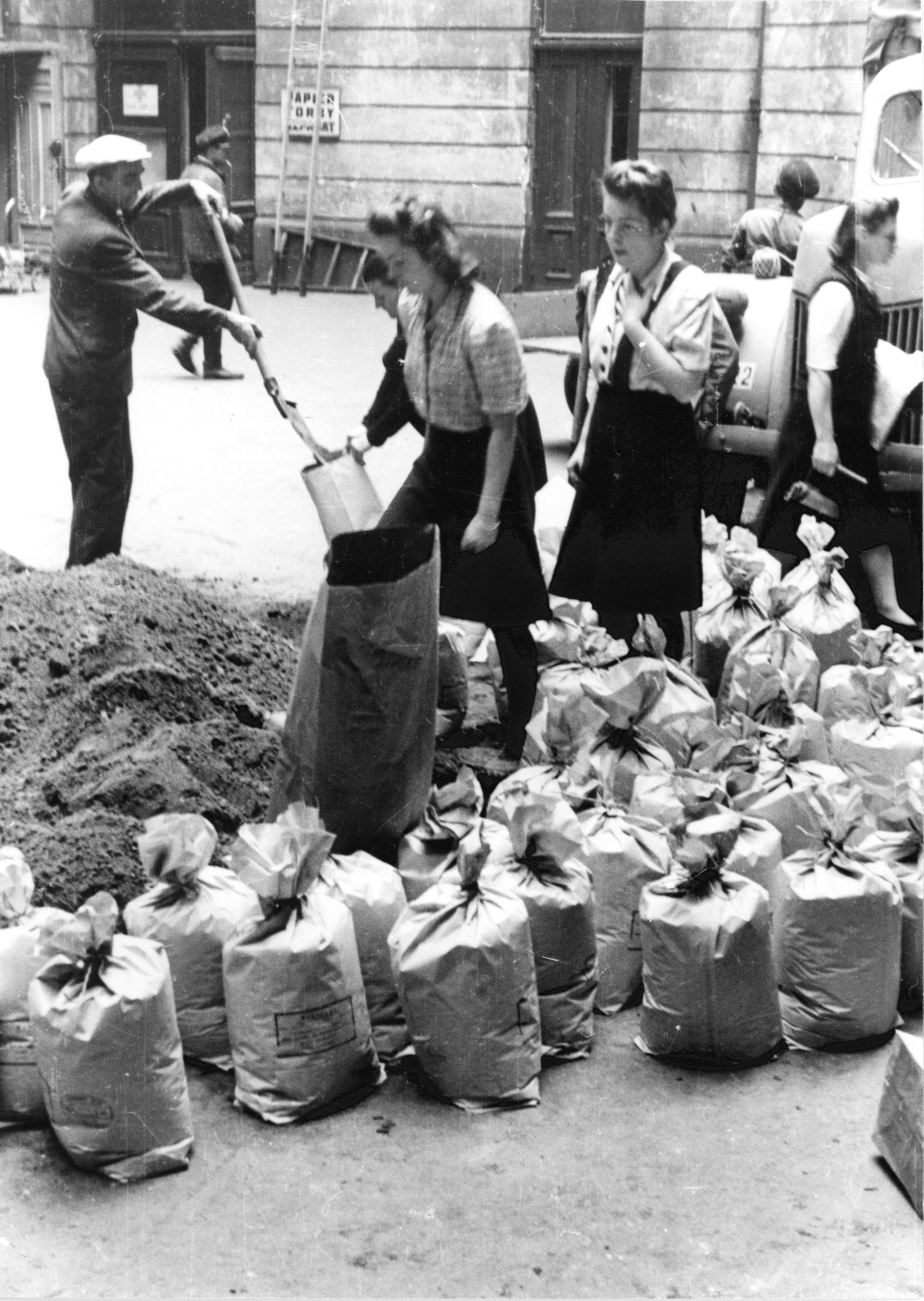
Among the materials frequently used for barricade construction are sandbags, pavement slabs and large vehicles

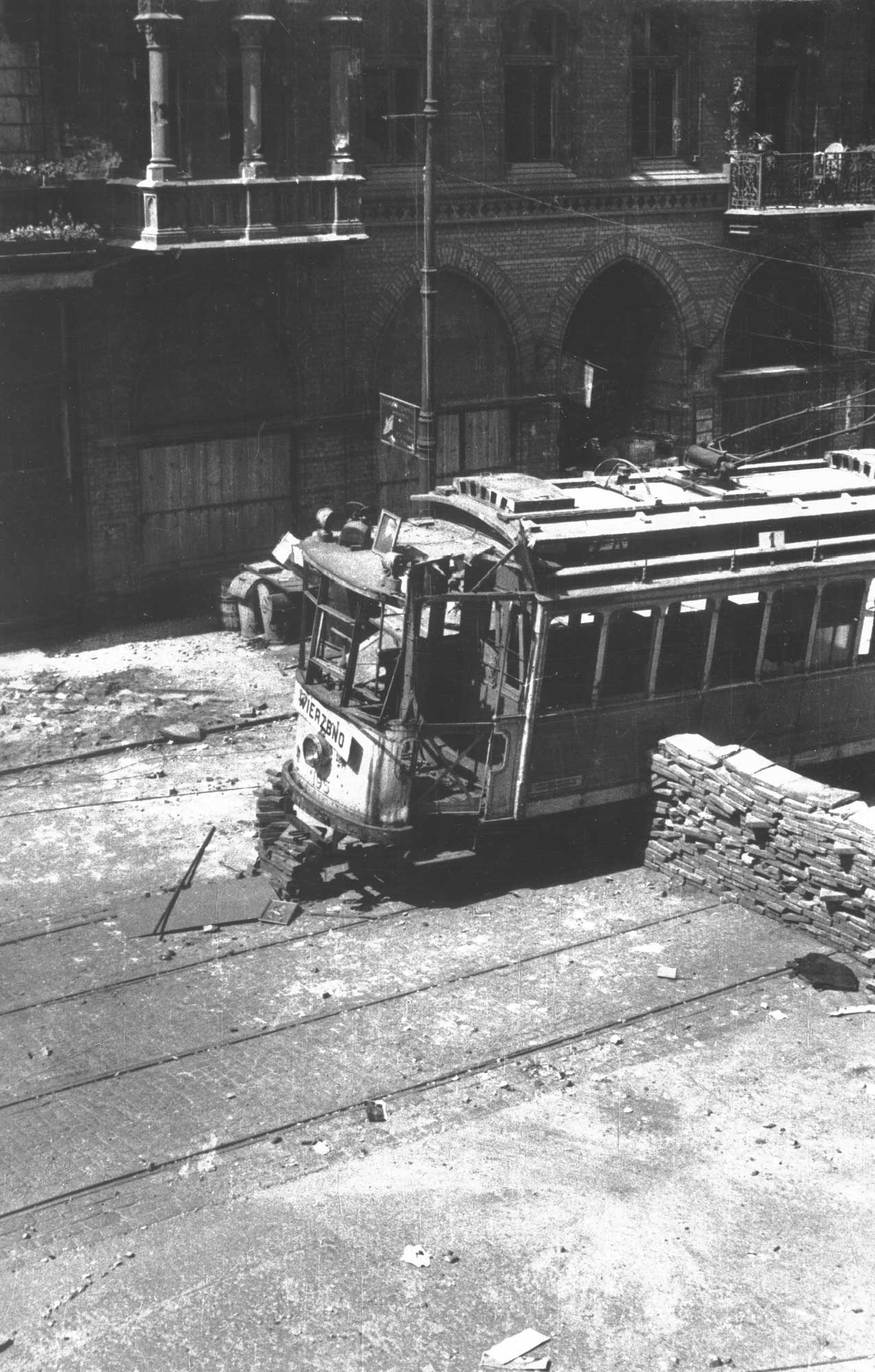
Streetcar as part of a barricade

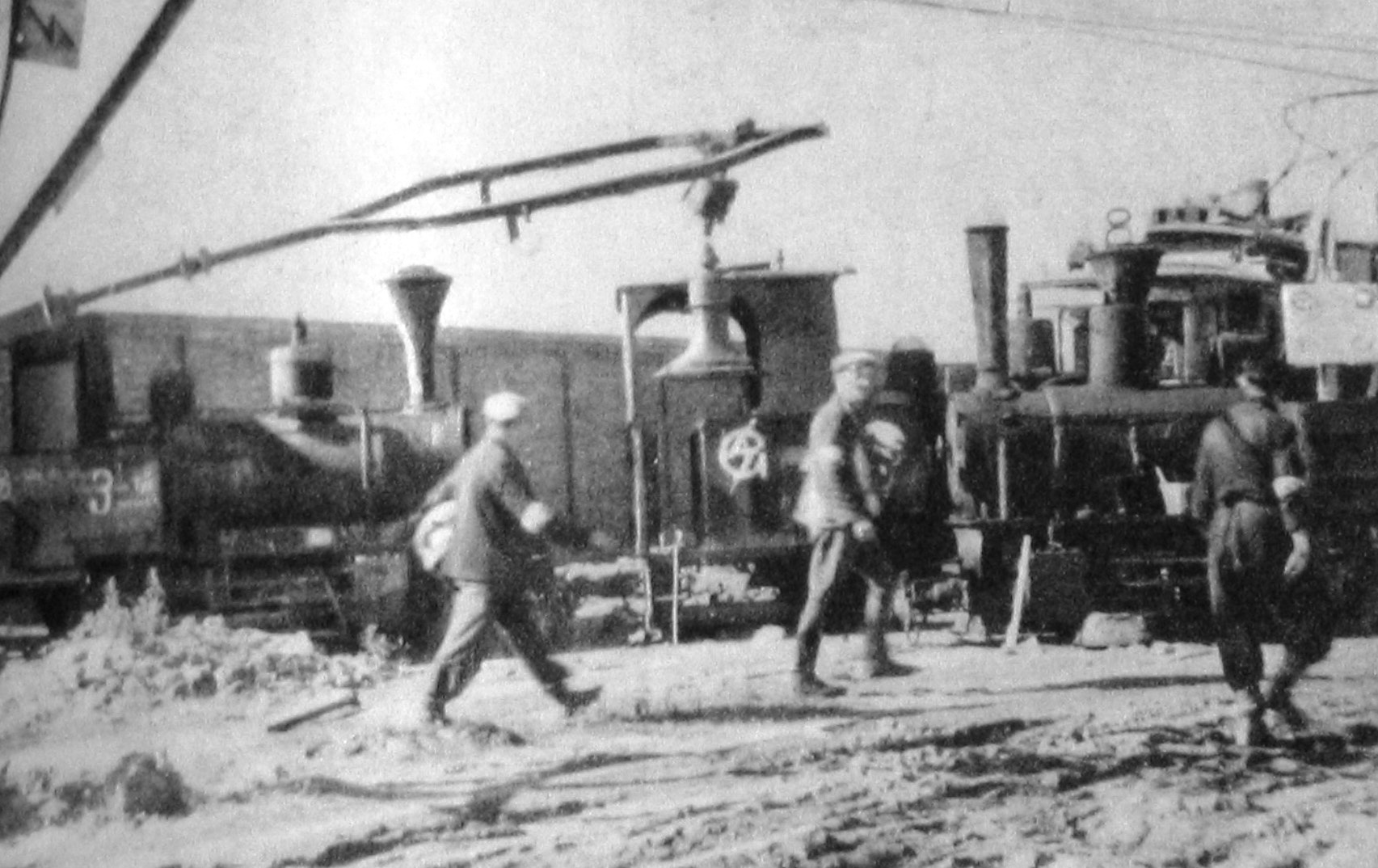
Improvised barricade made of train engines

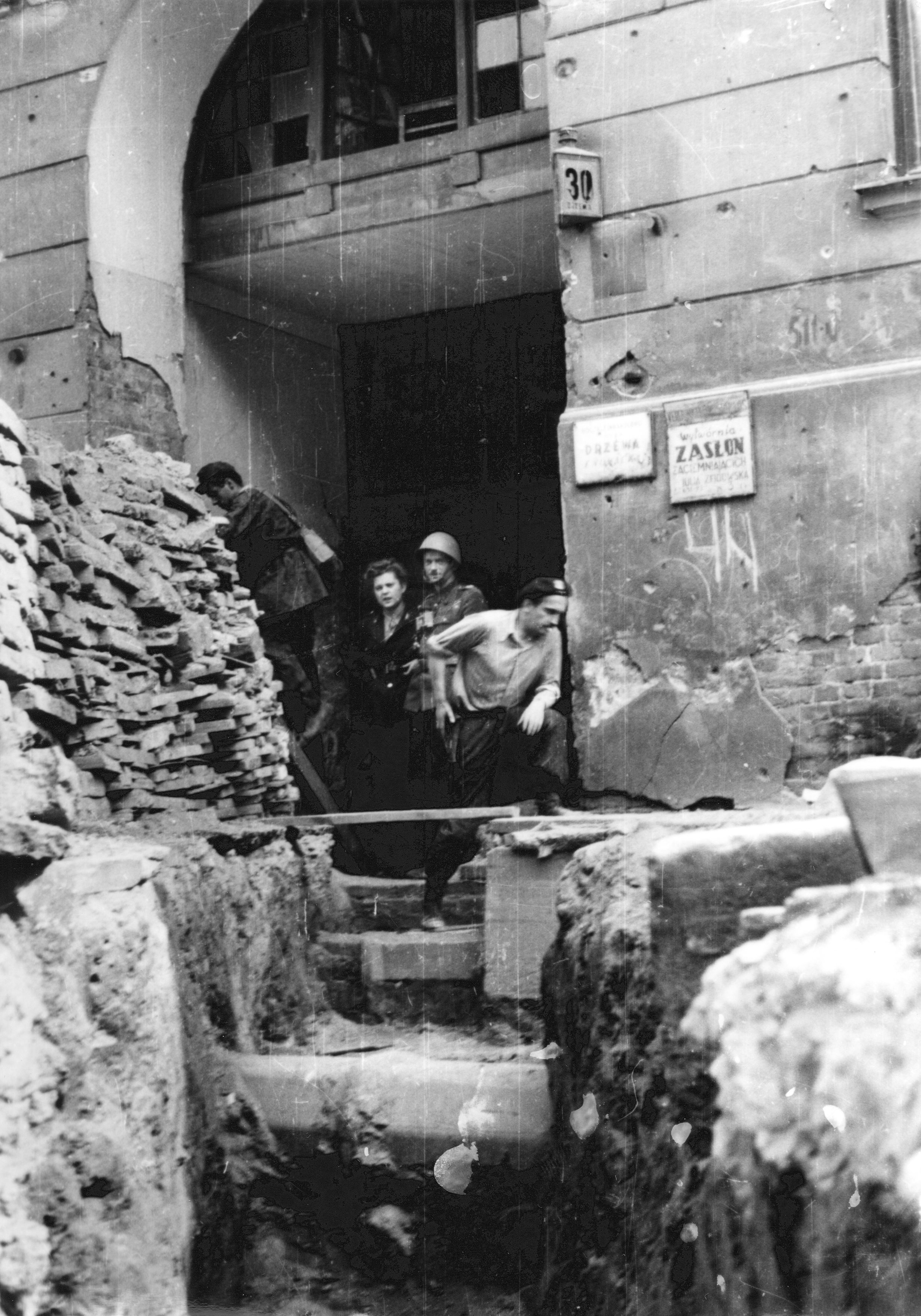
Pavement slabs barricade and a trench behind it during the Warsaw Uprising

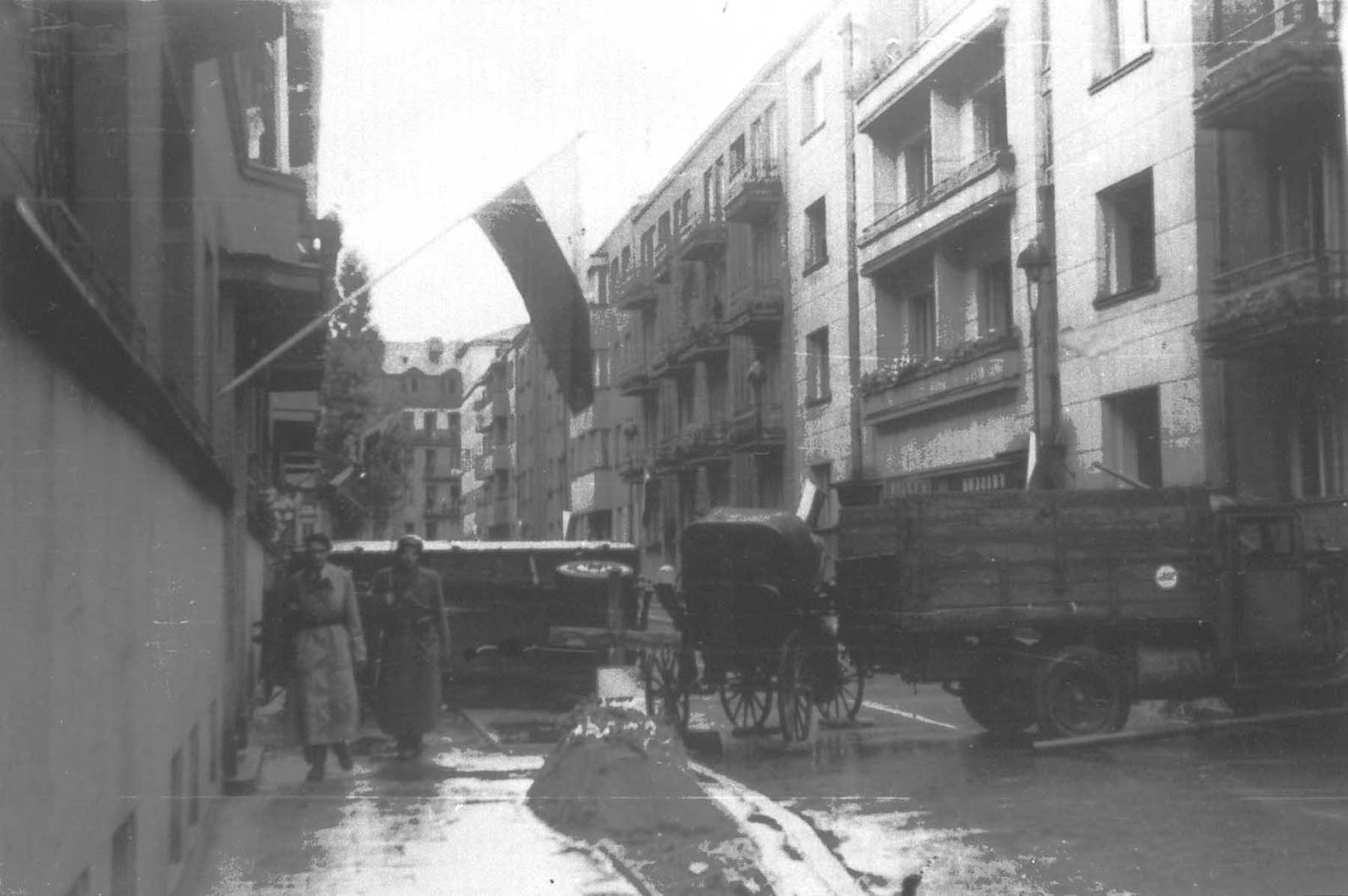
Improvised barricade built with vehicles

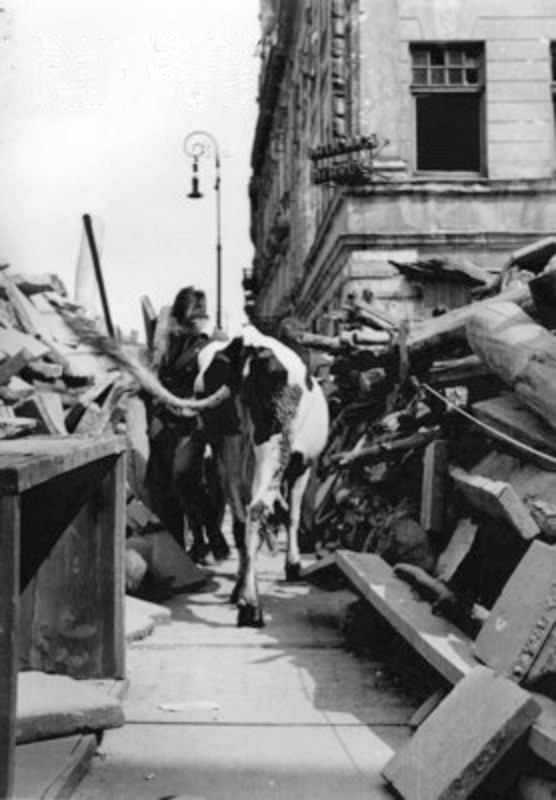
A barricade in Warsaw protecting civilians from enemy fire when crossing a street

Revolutionary barricades during the 1848 May Uprising in Dresden

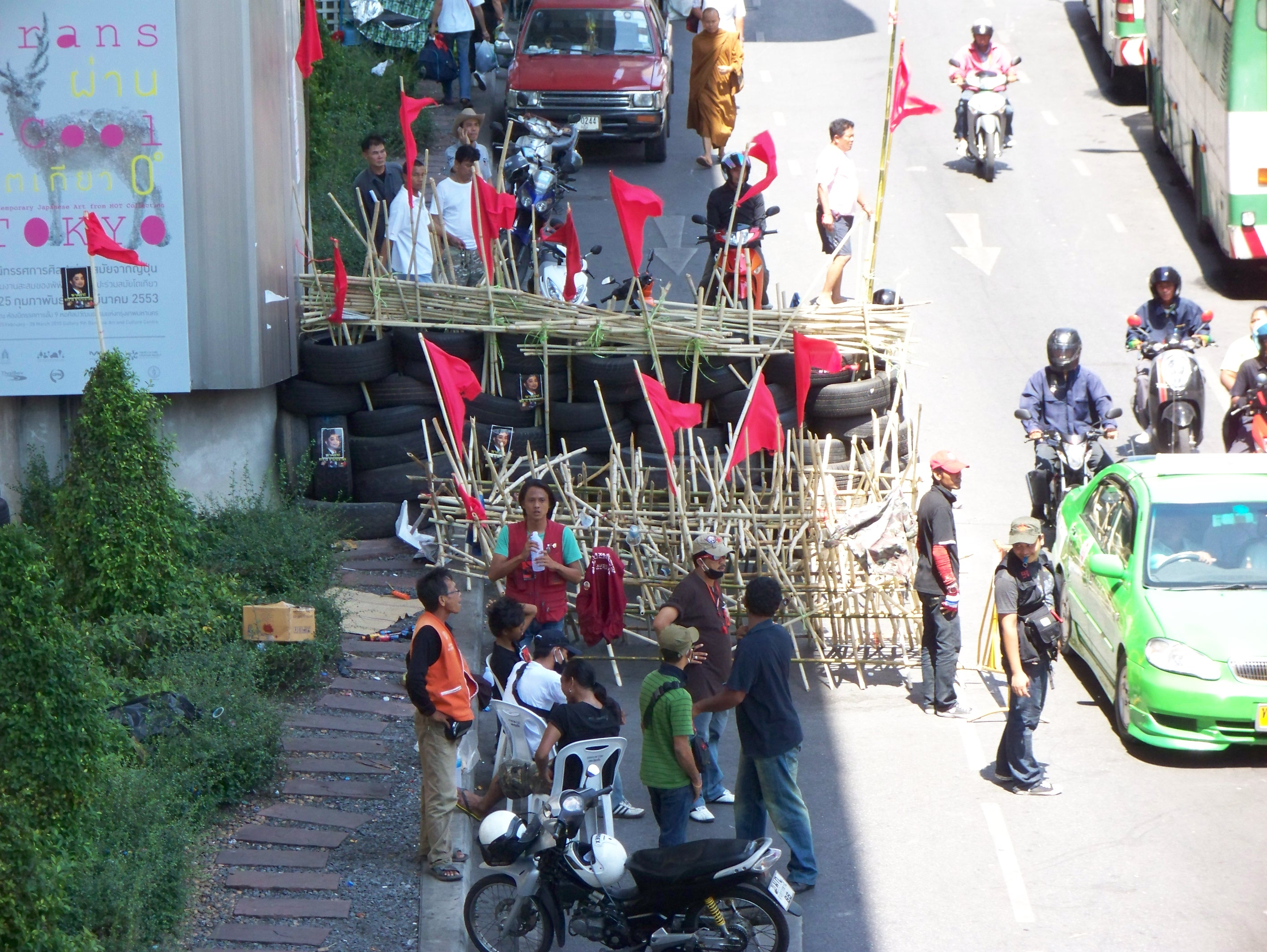
Barricades made of old tyres and bamboo during the 2010 Thai political protests

== See also ==
- The Barricades
- Bulwark
- Border barrier
- Rampart
- Ley Anti Barricadas
- Jersey barrier
- A las Barricadas ('To the Barricades')
