= Traffic barricade =

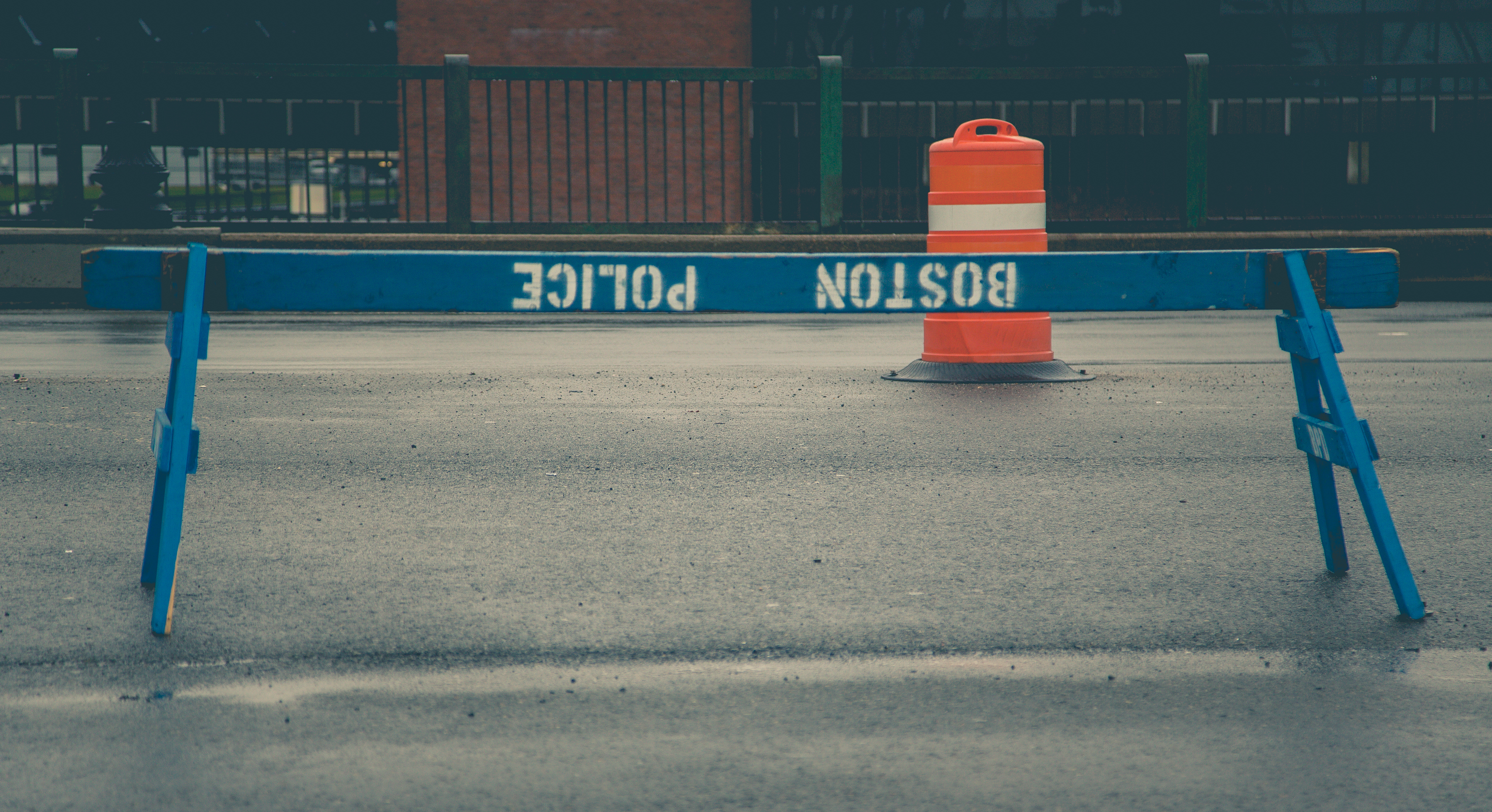
An A-frame traffic barricade used by the Boston Police Department

A traffic barricade is a type of barricade used to control the flow of traffic or block access to an area, generally for safety purposes. Traditionally made of wood, or wood and steel, many now have structural members made wholly of plastic or composite materials, and may be fitted with flashing lights.

The obstruction that necessitates the use of a traffic barricade may be excavations, construction, roadblocks, debris, crime scenes, restricted areas, or other hazards.

== Types of barricades ==
- The A-frame barricade or parade barricade resembles a sawhorse with a brightly painted top rail.
- The Type I (or II) barricade also known as a waffle-board barricade resembles a sawhorse that can be folded flat. Type I indicates sheeting on top; Type II has sheeting on top and bottom.
- The Type III barricade has multiple rails supported by two end posts.

Type I, II and III barricades are commonly used for road detours and closings where vehicles are present. A-frame barricades are more typically seen where pedestrian traffic control is needed or used on low speed roads.

In addition to the more traditional traffic barricades mentioned above, there are several other categories of barricades that get used regularly for traffic channelization, including Jersey barriers, traffic barrels, and vertical panels. Depending on space and need, all of these categories are listed as acceptable barricade devices in the Manual on Uniform Traffic Control Devices.

== See also ==
- Barricade tape
- Traffic cone
