= La marcha más grande de Chile =

2019 Chilean peaceful protest

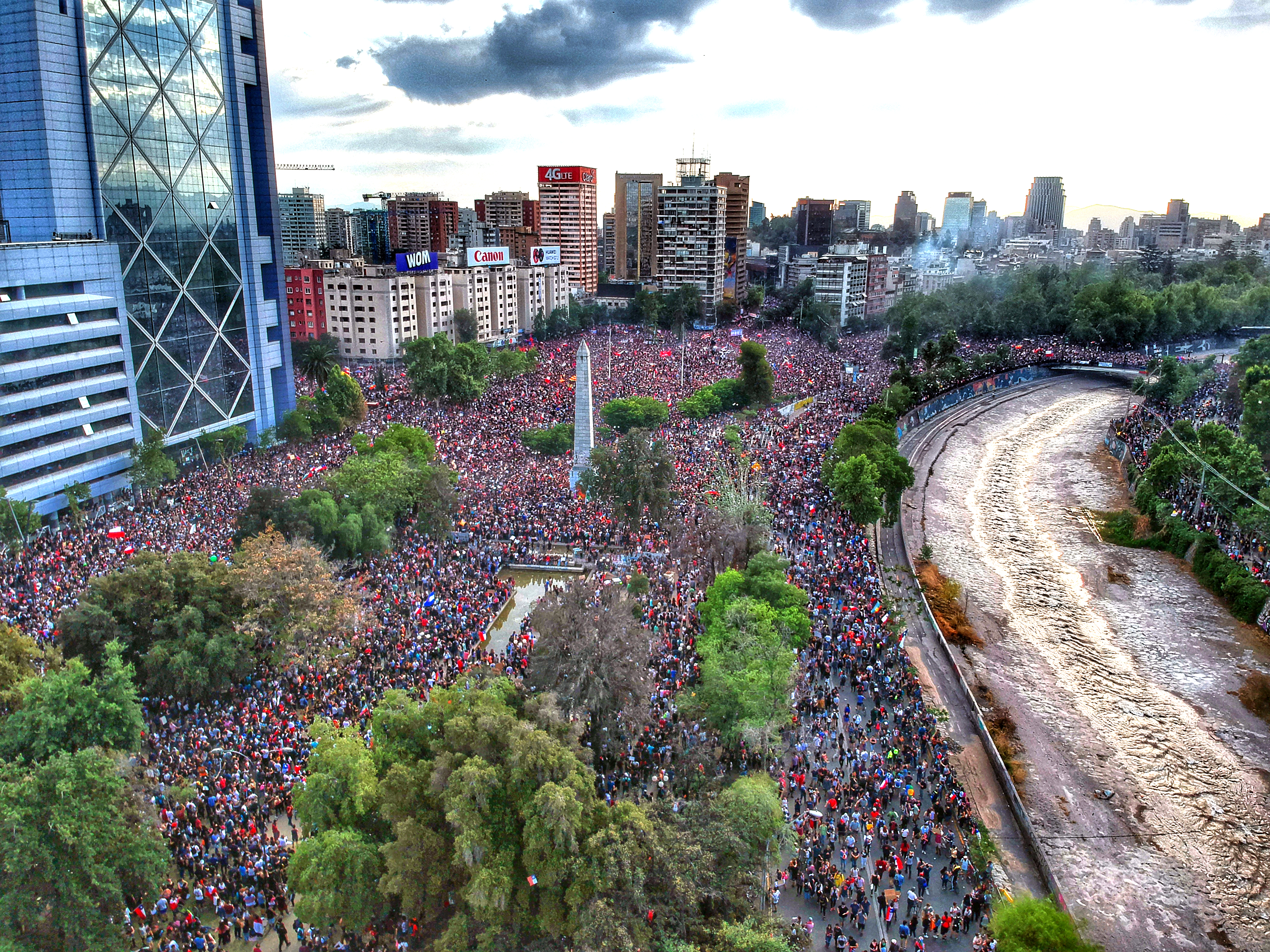
Partial view of the march from Providencia.

360 degrees view of the march

La marcha más grande de Chile (literally The biggest march of Chile) was a demonstration that took place in Santiago de Chile on October 25, 2019, as part of the 2019–2021 Chilean protests. It was considered a "peaceful concentration" by local authorities and by the national and international press. In Santiago alone, more than 1.2 million people participated, the biggest protest concentration in Chile's modern history, surpassing the record settled in 1988, by the closing rally of the "No" option in the 1988 national plebiscite. In total, it is believed that more than 3 million people across the country participated in the protest.

== Reasons for the march ==
The march took place without any personal or political leadership, and included the presence and involvement of people from all walks of life. The protesters gathered with the central hope for a "new" Chile, one which would be more equitable and representing of all people. Although the march's organization did not have a political leader or the presence of a party or political movement, various social movements converged in favor of social justice. The organizers were against neoliberal policies present in the country's economy such as: the privatization of basic services (electricity, drinking water and sanitation, etc.), income inequality, concentration of wealth, as well as monopolies and collusion. The deployment of the Chilean army in the streets of Santiago and the curfew imposed by president Sebastián Piñera on October 19, reminded civilians of Pinochet's dictatorship in the 1973–1990 period thus encouraging the march.

== Development ==
The protesters began to gather at the Plaza Baquedano in the limit of Providencia and Santiago commune, the center of the massive concentrations in the Chilean capital. It had the presence of various units of Carabineros to protect public order, citizen security, and military personnel from the Army who were guarding the city. The march included cacerolazos, cheers, songs, dances, and other artistic and cultural expressions. One of the emblematic songs that were sung in unison by protesters was "El Baile de los que Sobran" by Los Prisioneros.

According to the authorities' estimates, the march was attended by approximately 1.2 million people, making it the largest demonstration in the history of Chile, surpassing the protests against the 1988 national plebiscite, which began the process of transition to democracy. Although dubbed as a "march", it was a 3 km long assemblage of people stretching from Providencia Avenue with Eliodoro Yáñez Avenue at east, to La Moneda Palace in Alameda. As it grew the overflowing tide of people spread to surrounding parks such as Forestal, Bustamante, Balmaceda, San Borja and neighborhoods such as Bellavista, Lastarria and others. At the end of the march, the presence of the Primea Línea was reported. However, they were dispersed by the Carabineros de Chile's anti-riot police units.

== Government response ==
As a result of this massive demonstration, the following day the Government of Chile announced a series of measures framed within the so-called "New Social Agenda," which included freezing the prices of some services and changes in the country's social security norms. These included salary improvements and the reduction of the parliamentarians' salaries of the National Congress and the highest positions in the country. The former, however, was not exempt from criticism as it was being considered insufficient. More relevantly, Piñera called for a Constitutional referendum to determine if the public agrees to initiate a constituent process and determine its mechanism. Exactly one year later, the referendum was held and the alternative to approving the drafting of a new constitution won by 78.28%, and a Constitutional Convention as the mechanism to do it with a 79.00%. The Constitutional Convention election was held on 16 May 2021.
