= Church of the Divine Providence =

Church of the Divine Providence may refer to:

- Iglesia de la Divina Providencia
- Our Lady of Divine Providence Church, Providenciales
- Cathedral of Divine Providence, Chișinău
