= Germán Bannen =

Chilean engineer and politician (1928–2019)

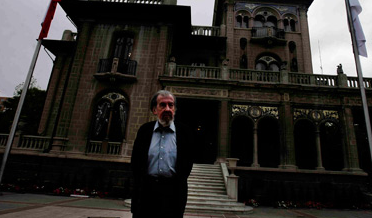

Personal details
- Born: 28 May 1928 Talagante, Chile
- Died: 14 October 2019 (aged 91) Santiago, Chile
- Spouse: Liliana Lanata Macchi
- Education: Pontifical Catholic University of Valparaíso (BA); University of Chile (MA)
- Profession: Architect

Germán Bannen Lay (25 May 1928−14 October 2019) was a Chilean engineer and politician. He was Urbanism National Prize in 2003.

Bannen developed well part of his professional trajectory as an urban advisor for the Municipality of Providencia, a middle-high class commune of Santiago, the capital city of Chile. He taught lessons at the Pontifical Catholic University School of Architecture and Urbanism, where he trained a large number of generations of architects together with his wife Liliana Lanata Macchi.

== Biography ==
Bannen entered the Pontifical Catholic University of Chile (PUC) to study a BA in architecture, a career that ended at the Pontifical Catholic University of Valparaíso (PUCV), where he obtained his degree in 1956. At the PUCV, he was part of its first generation of architects. Later, Bannen specialized his acknowledgments in Urban Development at the Center for Ekistic Studies in Athens, Greece (1972).

From 1962 to 1988, Bannen was an urban planner and director of the Department of Urban Development of the Municipality of Providencia. Similarly, from 1973 to the 2010s, he was director of the CORMU Providencia Society. On the other hand, Bannen also was the national director of the College of Architects of Chile (1992−1996) and advisor on urban areas matters of the aforementioned municipality (1989−2015).

In the scholar sphere, Bannen began as a workshop professor at his second alma mater, the PUCV (1956−1958). Then, in 1974, he was hired by the PUC to taught lessons. In 2001, he taught at the University of La Serena and the Federico Santa María Technical University, also from Valparaíso.

After a lifetime of contributions to urbanism, the training of other professionals, and various achievements, Bannen died on 14 October 2019 aged 91.

== Urban works ==
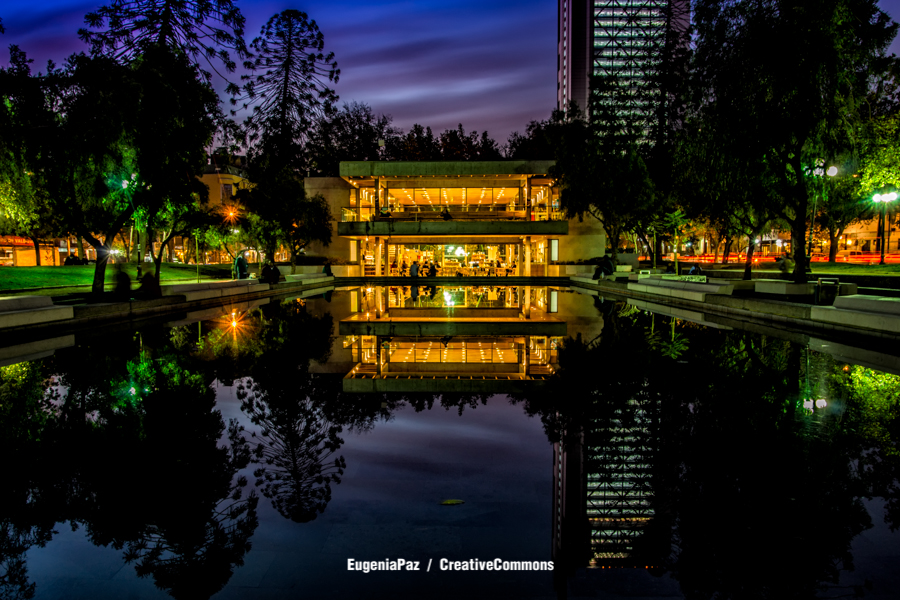
Back view of the Balmaceda Park Literary cafe.

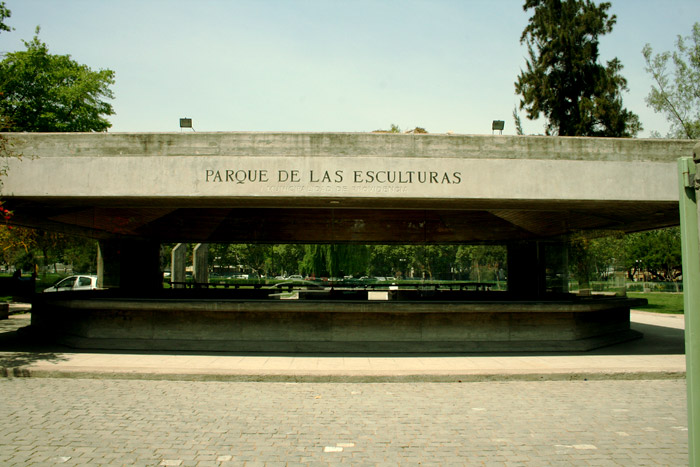
Frontis Pavilion of the Park of the Escultures.

- Park of the Escultures.
- Nueva Providencia Avenue.
- Balmaceda Park Literary cafe.
- Bustamante Park Literary cafe.
- Club Providencia.
- Remodelation of Pocuro Avenue.
- Pedro de Valdivia Square.

== Awards ==
- Award from the 1974 College of Architects for the Nueva Providencia project.
- Award from the 1980 Ministry of Housing and Urban Planning to the Municipality of Providencia for his work in the field of urban development.
- 1995 Alfredo Johnson Award (awarded by the College of Architects).
- 1997 Pan American Federation of Architects Award.
- Appointment as Emeritus Professor of the Pontifical Catholic University of Chile (1998).
- 2003 National Urbanism Award.
