= Iglesia de la Divina Providencia =

Sisters of Providence church in Santiago, Chile

Coordinates: 33°25′39.08″S 70°36′58.68″W

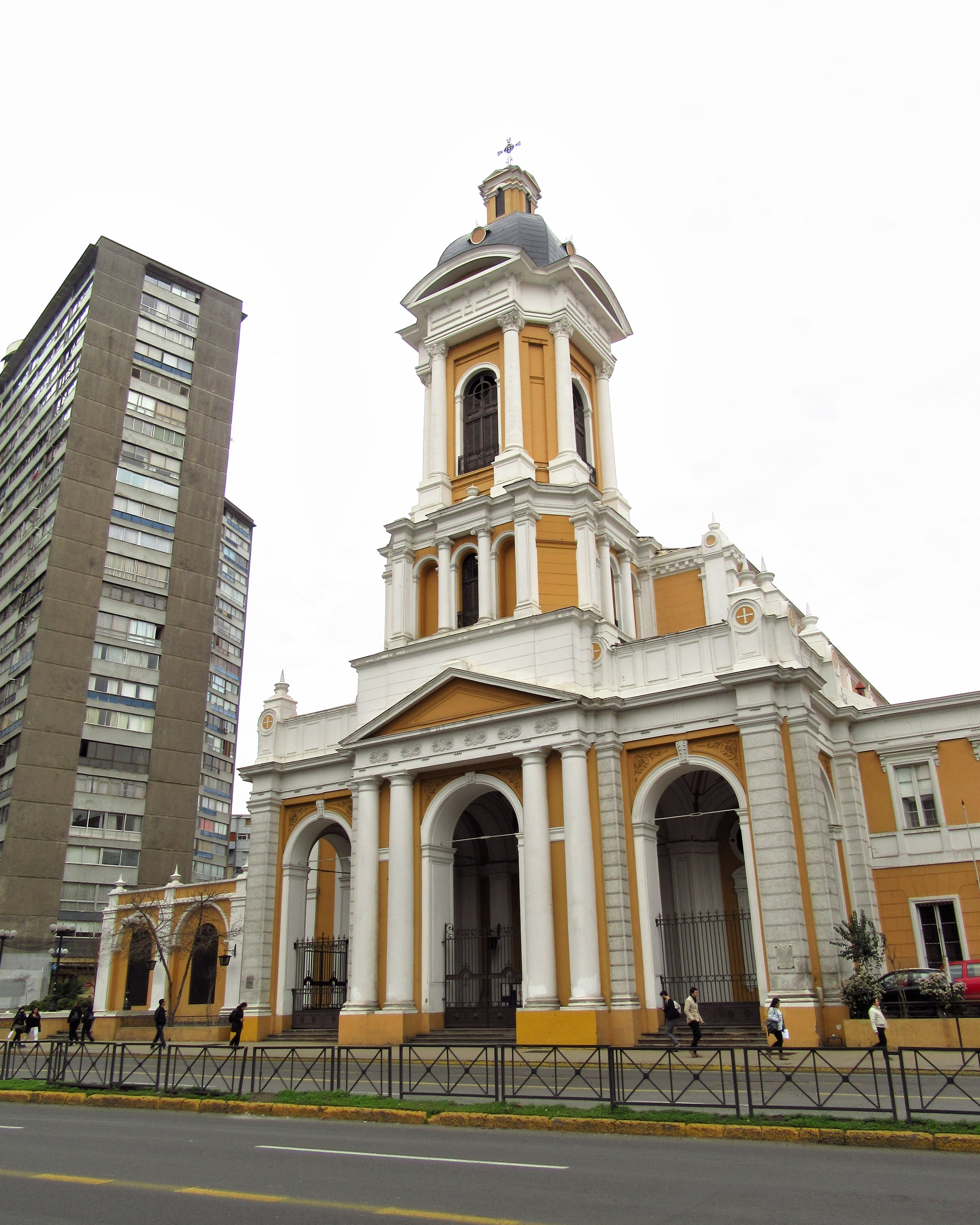
Avenida Providencia

The Iglesia de la Divina Providencia (English: Church of the Divine Providence) is a church managed by the Sisters of Providence, in Santiago, Chile. It gives its name to the district of Providencia and also to Avenida Providencia. The church was originally declared as a National Monument in 1975, but this designation was revoked and again designated as a national monument in 1989.

== History ==
In 1854, the land where the church stands was acquired to build an orphan asylum for the purpose of replacing the old asylum located on the current Huérfanos Street. Its operation was given to the Sisters of Providence by the then minister Antonio Varas.Several years later, Domingo Santa María approved the construction of a church for the orphanage. Designed by architect Eduardo Provasoli, the church was built between 1881 and 1890 in Neo-Renaissance style.

The orphanage was run by the Sisters of Providence until 1941. Its closure was in 1955 and the orphans were relocated to the Ciudad del Niño Presidente Juan Antonio Ríos. The orphanage facility was demolished with the exclusion of the church and other minor constructions.

The top of its bell tower was destroyed by the 2010 Chile earthquake.
