= Bustamante Park =

Urban park in Providencia, Santiago de Chile

Coordinates: 33°26′27″S 70°37′56″W

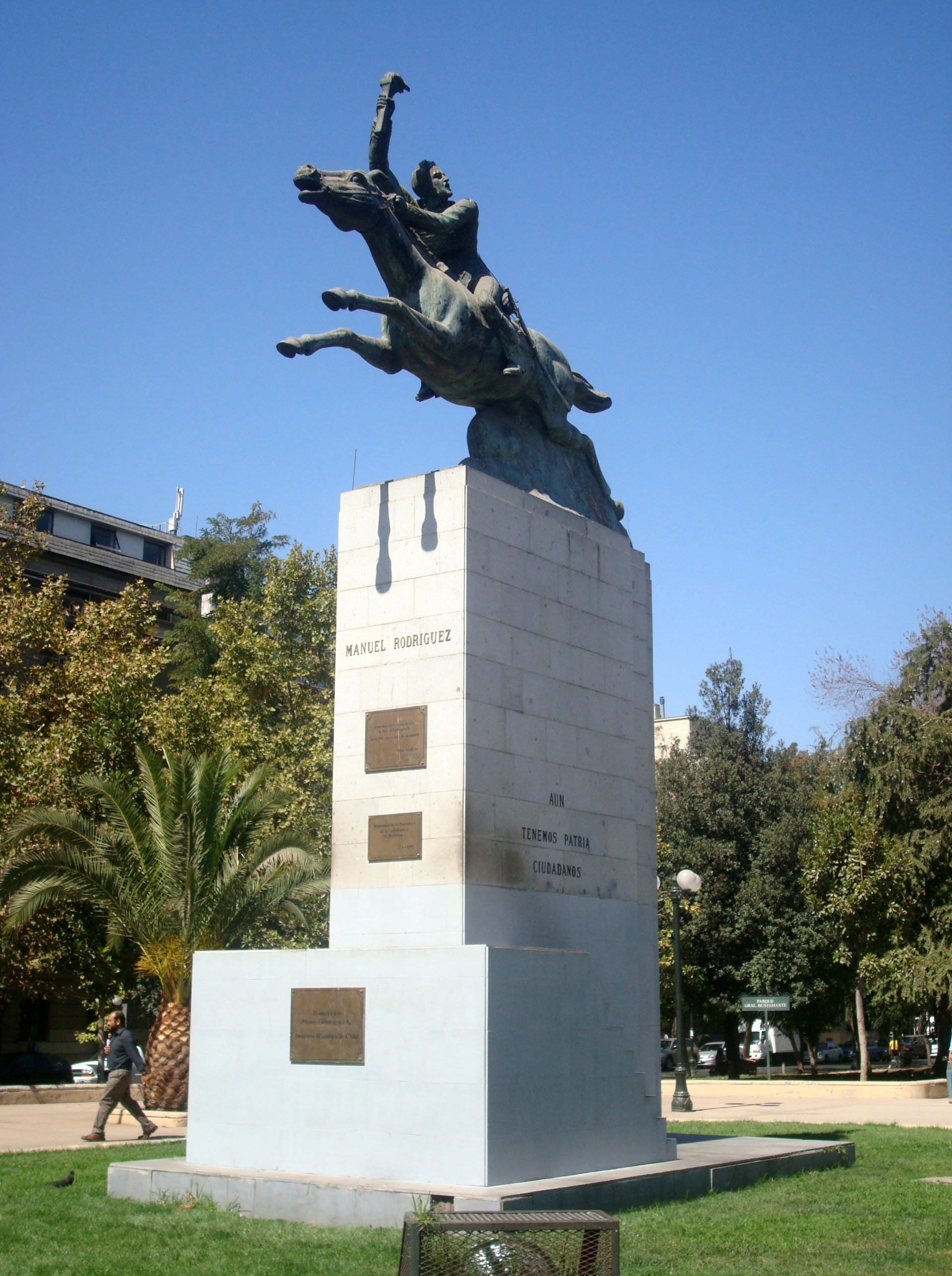
- Monument to Manuel Rodríguez Erdoíza
- Interactive map of Bustamante Park
- Type: Urban park
- Location: Santiago, Chile
- Status: Open all year

Bustamante Park is an urban park in Providencia, Santiago de Chile. It is built on the former site of Pirque railroad station and adjacent classification yard. The park is bounded by Providencia Avenue on the north, just south of Plaza Baquedano, and Marín Street on the south.

== Features ==
Bustamante Park features bicykle paths, exercise equipment, a literary café, skatepark, monuments and water feature. In recent years a number of new cafés and restaurants have opened around the park. Bustamante Park has also become a popular location for outdoor entertainment, with the Providencia Theatre Festival held there annually.

Line 5 of the Santiago Metro runs under the entire length of the park, stopping at Baquedano and Parque Bustamante metro stations. Valdivieso advertising sign is located on one of the buildings that line the park.

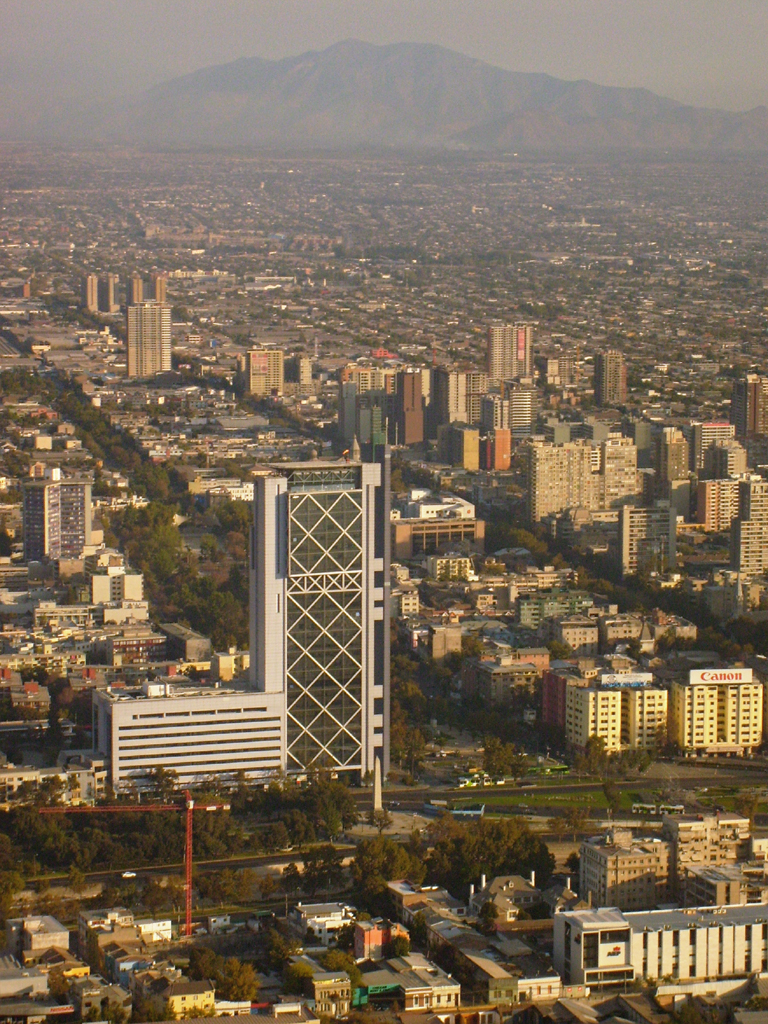
Complete extension of the Bustamente Park. From Avenida Providencia between the former Telefónica Tower and the Turri Buildings, to the Jofré street in the so-called Parquecito Playground behind the Amphitheater and in front of the Church of Pompeya.

== Origins and development ==
Both the park and the avenue bordering it to the east take their name from José Antonio Bustamante, who fought in the battles of Chacabuco and Maipú.

In the 19th century, located in the area where the park now stands was an avenue running parallel to Vicuña Mackenna Avenue. This disappeared in 1894 to make way for a railway joining Santiago with Puente Alto, which was then otherwise isolated from the city, through Pirque railroad station (built facing Providencia Avenue between 1905 and 1911, today the location of Metro Baquedano).

In the early 1940s, the stretch of rail between Pirque railroad station and Ñuñoa railroad station was dismantled, with the Pirque railroad station demolished by 1943, leaving space for the park to take shape.

On December 27, 1947, at the northern end of the park towards Plaza Baquedano, the Monument to Manuel Rodríguez was installed. In May 2008, the project of the architect Germán Bannen was inaugurated; a two-story Literary Café "Café Literario" with a cafeteria, small library and reading spaces, as well as views of the park with a water mirror included. Some time later, a skatepark was opened between Avenida Rancagua and Avenida Francisco Bilbao.

== Gallery ==
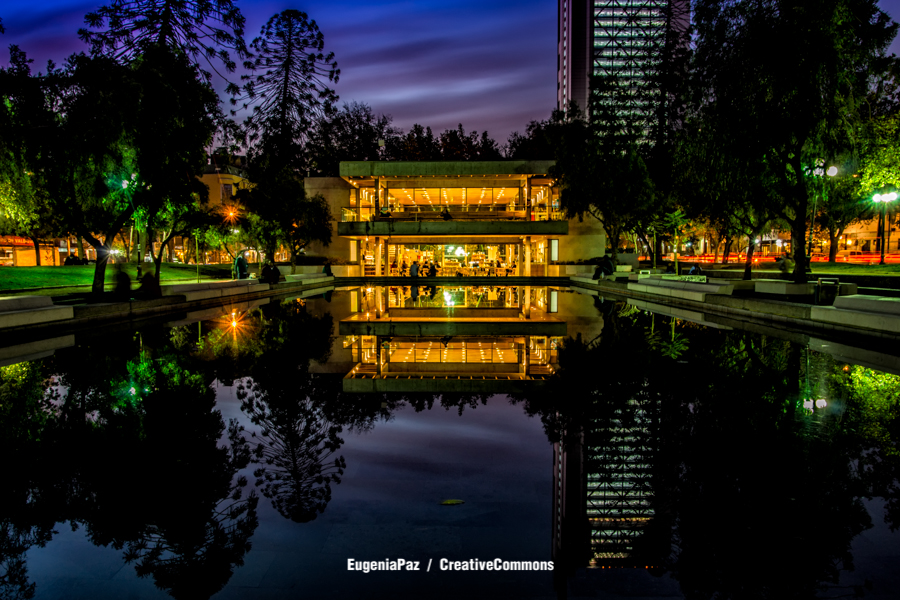
Café Literario, Bustamente Park

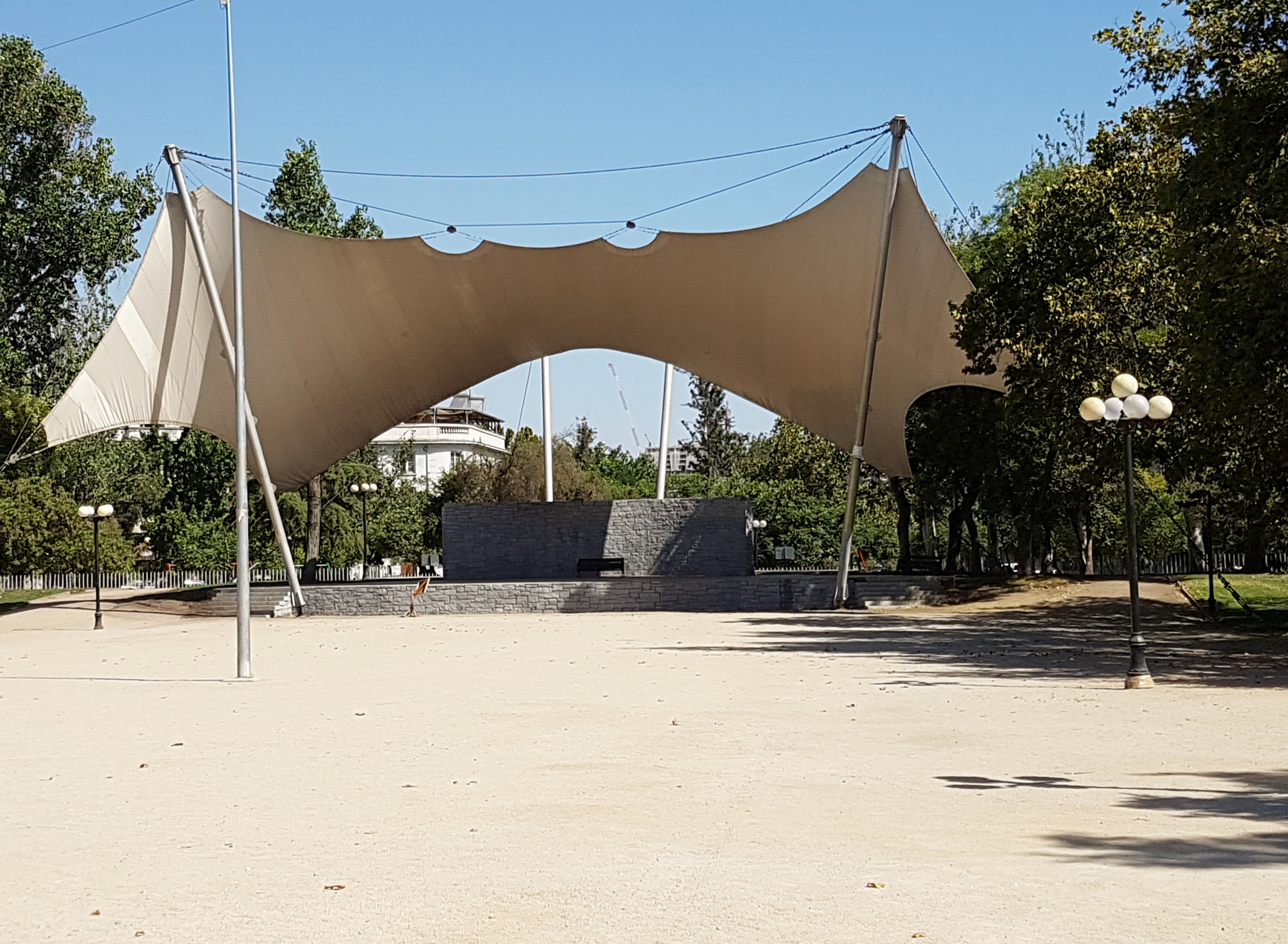
Anfiteatro, Bustamante Park

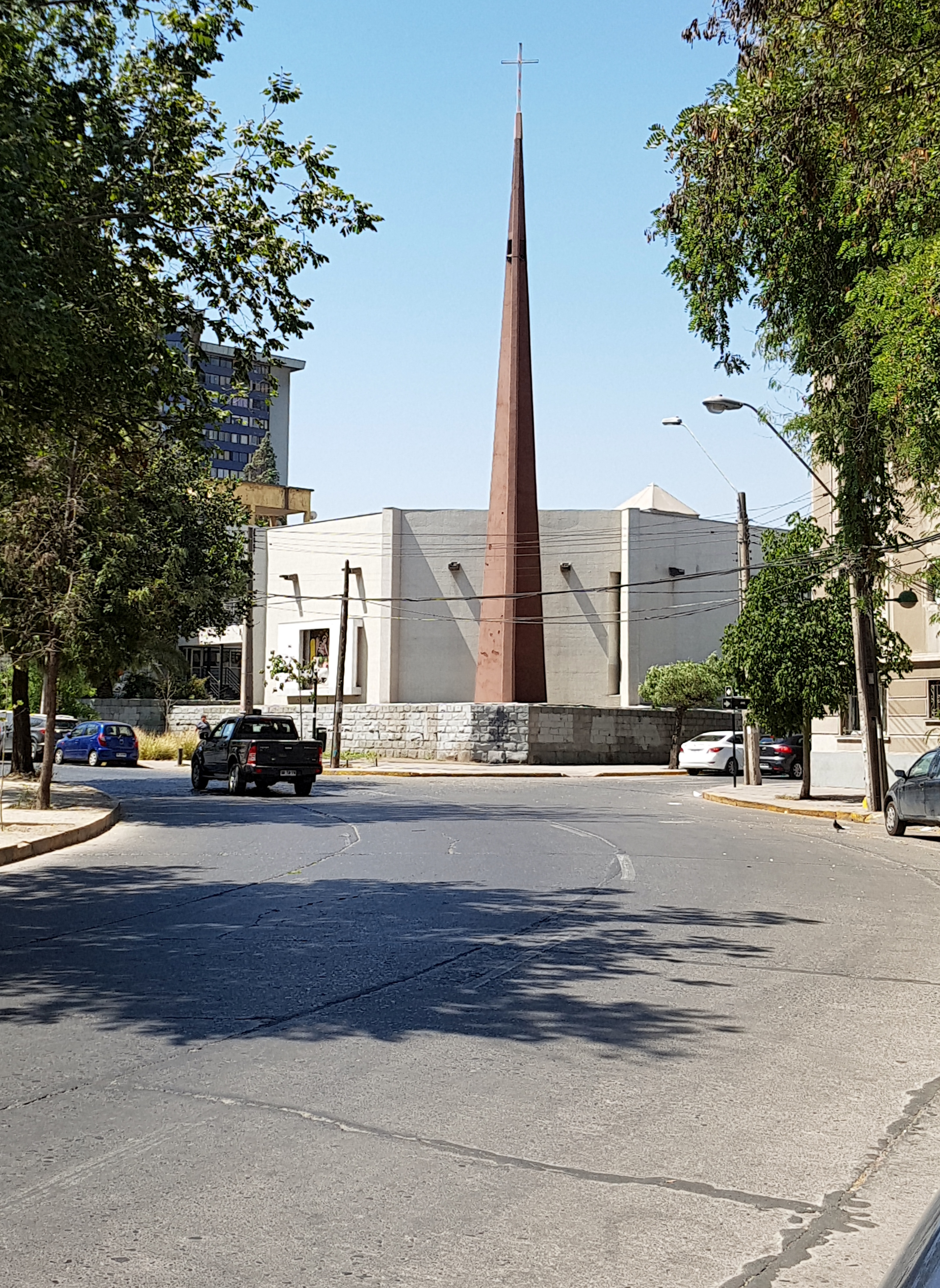
Nuestra Señora de Pompeya Church, Bustamante Park

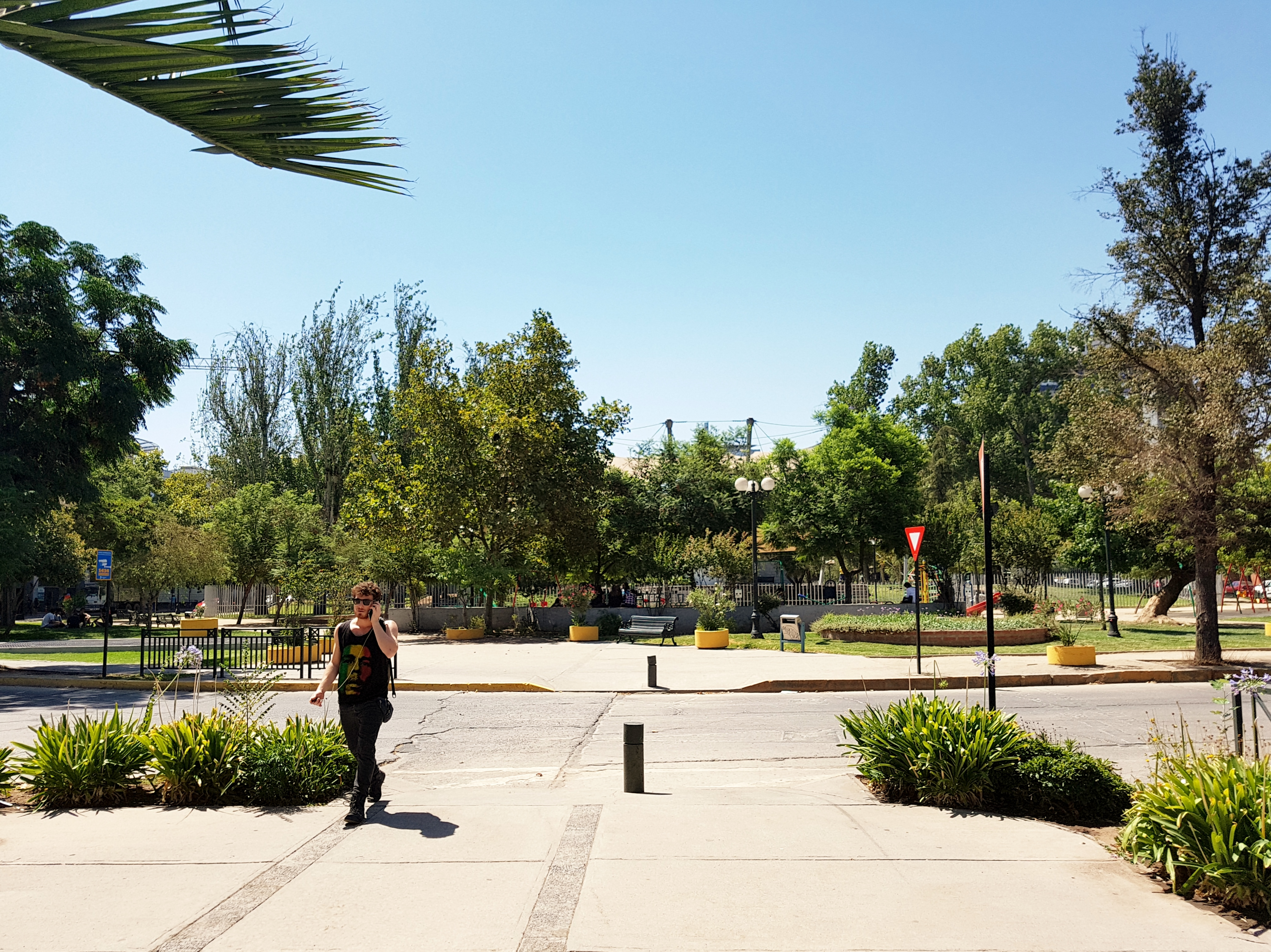
Final stretch Bustamente Park
