= Balmaceda Park =

Urban park in Providencia, Santiago, Chile

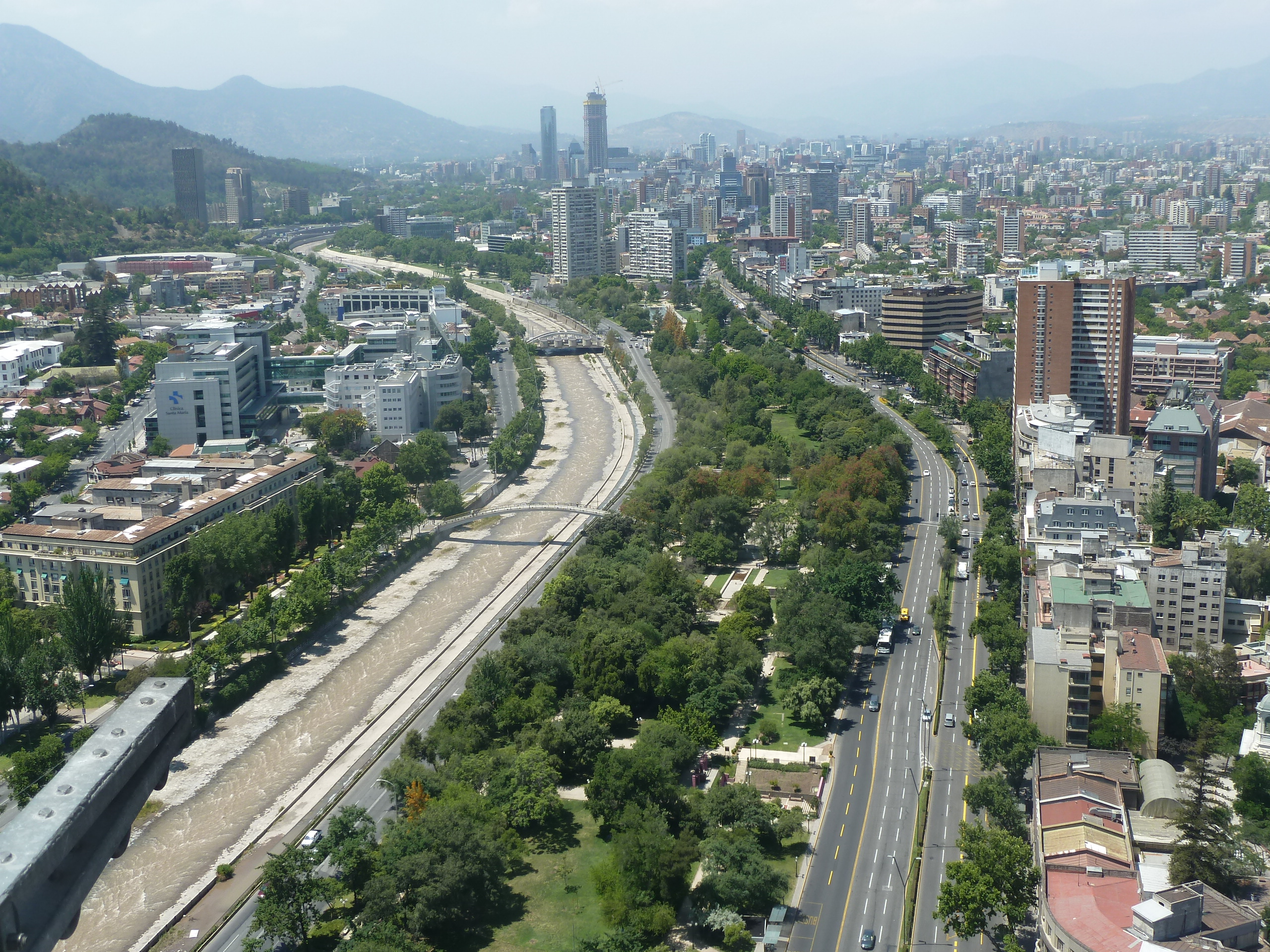
- Avenida Providencia
- Interactive map of Balmaceda Park
- Type: Urban park
- Location: Santiago, Chile
- Coordinates: 33°26′03.56″S 70°37′40.98″W
- Created: 1930
- Status: Open all year

Balmaceda Park is an urban park along the Mapocho River in Providencia, Santiago de Chile. It was originally created under the name of Parque Providencia in 1930, but it was called Parque Japonés (Japanese Park) because of the gardens inside of it. When Chile joined the Allies during the World War II, in 1943 its name was changed to Parque Gran Bretaña (Great Britain Park). Afterwards, the name was changed to its current name.

The park is adjacent to Plaza Baquedano. Toward the west, the park continues into Santiago as Parque Forestal. On the opposite bank of the river is the Barrio Bellavista.
