= La Vega Central Market =

Coordinates: 33.4302°S 70.6497°W

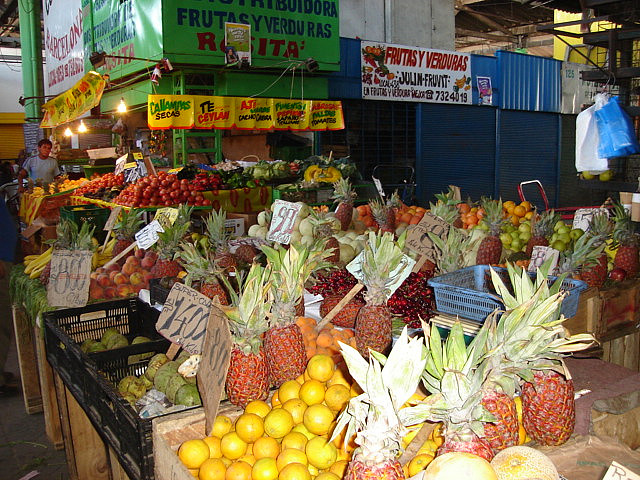
Produce at La Vega Central

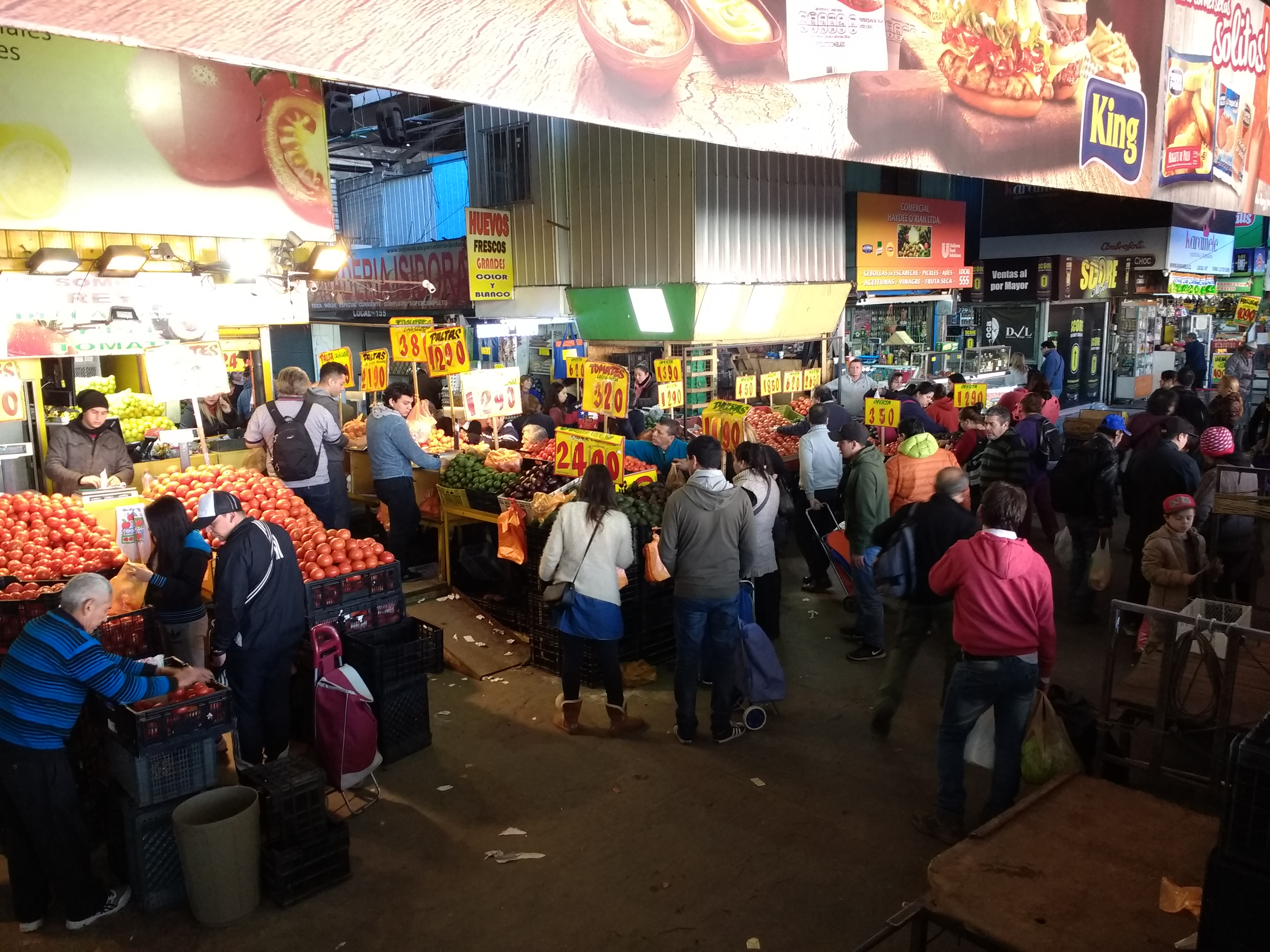
La Vega Central

La Vega Central, also known as the Feria Mapocho (Mapocho market), is a market located at the far south of Recoleta commune in Santiago de Chile, near the north bank of the Mapocho River. A wide variety of products are sold in its surrounds, principally fresh fruit and vegetables from the Chilean Central Valley. La Vega Central is also home to over 500 dairy, meat, goods and merchandise stores, and offers a variety of Chilean cuisine. The market covers 60,000 square meters and sees thousands of visitors pass through its stalls each day.

La Vega Central has achieved iconic status in Chile's capital. A long-time vendor at the market was quoted as saying, “Markets nowadays compete (for customers) by using marketing, but La Vega has never had to resort to this. It subsists on its own creation and that is its magic.”

== History ==
From the colonial era, farmers gathered in La Chimba area to sell their products. In the 18th century, with the construction of the Puente de Calicanto, a large number of vendors and merchants began to set up in its vicinity. In the 19th century, when the area was known as La Vega del Mapocho (the Mapocho market), the land was officially designated for the sale and consumption of produce, making use of the newly channeled Mapocho River. New storage facilities were also constructed for the loading and sale of produce. In 1895, an initiative by Agustín Gómez García led to the establishment of La Vega Central, with the inauguration of solid-material warehouses in 1916.
