= Parque Forestal =

Park in Santiago, Chile

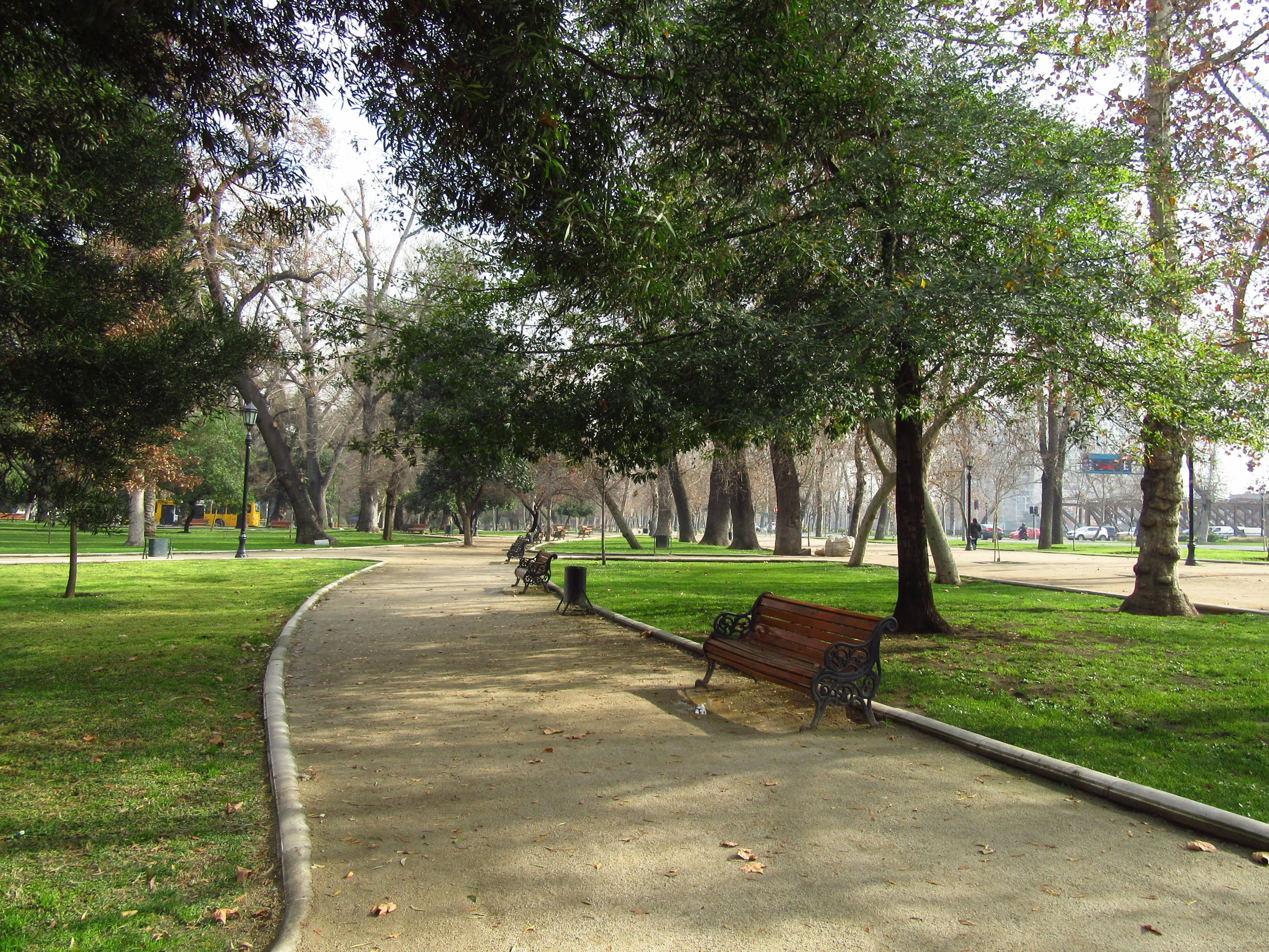
- Interactive map of Parque Forestal
- Type: Urban park
- Location: Santiago, Chile
- Coordinates: 33°26′09″S 70°38′28″W
- Created: 1905
- Status: Open all year

Parque Forestal is an urban park in the city of Santiago, Chile. The park was created on reclaimed land from the Mapocho River and is located in the historical downtown of Santiago, west of Plaza Baquedano and east of Estación Mapocho. It is bordered on the north by Santa María Avenue, on the south by Merced Street and Ismael Valdés Vergara Street. At its eastern end, the park becomes Balmaceda Park, forming an almost unbroken stretch of greenery along the Mapocho River.

The park contains the Chilean National Museum of Fine Arts, which is housed in the same building as the Santiago Museum of Contemporary Art. Palacio Bruna is opposite the park on Merced Street.

Distinctive features of the park are its three lines of platanus orientalis trees.
