= Providencia Avenue =

Avenue in Santiago, Chile

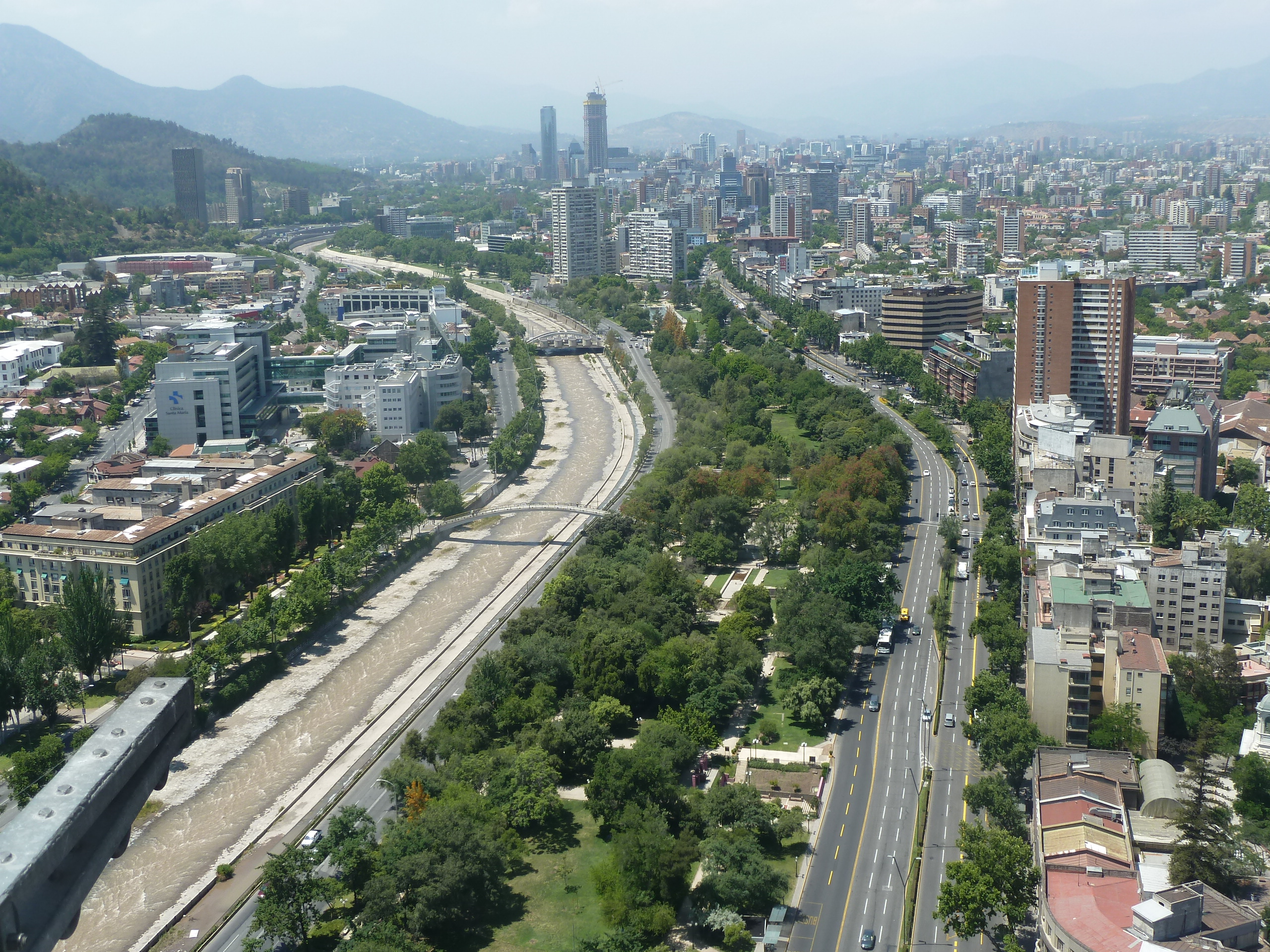
Providencia Avenue and Mapocho River

Avenida Providencia is a major thoroughfare in Santiago, Chile. It runs along the commune of Providencia.

== Description ==
Providencia begins at the northern terminus of Vicuña Mackenna Avenue as a continuation of Alameda Avenue. Immediately, the opposite traffic lanes are divided by the Plaza Baquedano. The two northernmost lanes of Providencia Avenue split from the westbound lanes and continue westward as Merced Street. The northern side of the avenue is occupied by Balmaceda Park.

Just east of José Miguel Claro Avenue, Providencia splits into two one-way streets. Westbound continues under the name Providencia, and the eastbound becomes Nueva Providencia Avenue (formerly known as 11 de Septiembre Avenue), which came into existence in 1980 as a measure to reduce traffic congestion on Providencia Avenue and was part of a dual project that also included the eastward extension of the Line 1 of the Santiago Metro. The former name of the street was an allusion to the date of the 1973 Chilean coup d'état. Its present name was given in 2013, though Nueva Providencia was the proposed name for the street when it was originally planned.

The streets rejoin just past Antonio Varas Avenue. This segment is home to the Iglesia de la Divina Providencia, which gives its name to the avenue. The avenue forks again and passes through the commercial heart of Providencia. The fork to the south is also called Nueva Providencia, which merges with Providencia Avenue east of Los Leones Avenue. Here Vitacura Avenue terminates, with its westernmost segment being one-way westbound, which continues as Providencia Avenue. That stretch of Vitacura Avenue is fronted by Costanera Center. East of Los Leones Avenue, motor traffic is one-way eastbound until Tobalaba Avenue, the eastern terminus of Providencia Avenue, where the avenue becomes Apoquindo Avenue.
