= Our Lady of Divine Providence Church, Providenciales =

Our Lady of Divine Providence
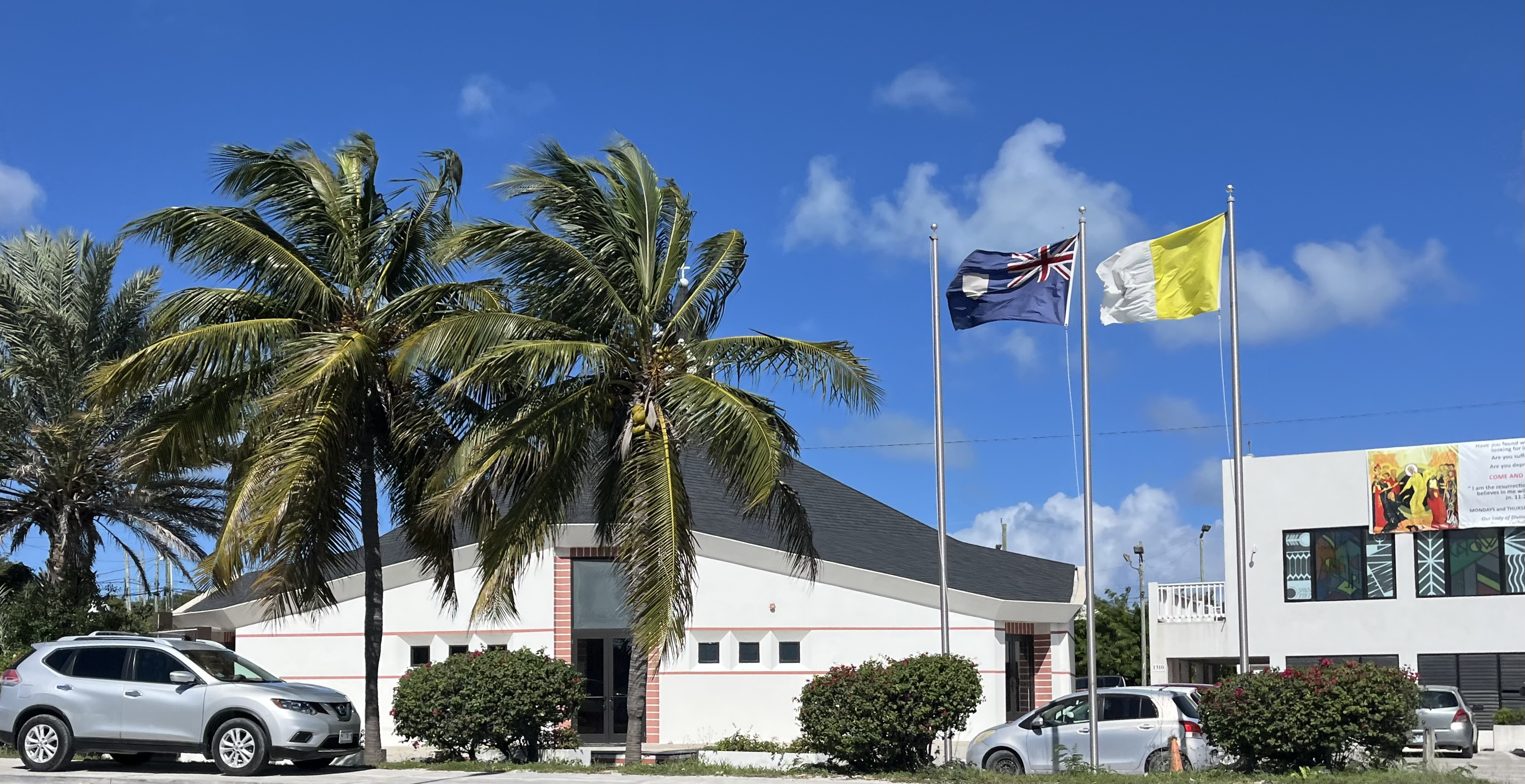
- Our Lady of Divine Providence
- 21°46′55″N 72°15′10″W
- Location: Providenciales
- Country: Turks and Caicos Islands; United Kingdom
- Denomination: Roman Catholic Church

The Our Lady of Divine Providence Church, Providenciales is a Catholic place of worship on Providenciales, an island of Turks and Caicos in the Caribbean.

== Description ==
It follows the Roman or Latin rite and depends on the mission sui iuris of the Turks and Caicos Islands (Missio Sui Iuris Turcensium et Caicensium).

Religious services in the church are given in English and additionally in Spanish and Haitian Creole.

The interior of the church has paintings that depict the life of Jesus Christ.

The original building was replaced in 2011, due to an increase in membership

== See also ==
- Our Lady of Divine Providence
- TCIFA National Academy
