= Ciudad del Niño Presidente Juan Antonio Ríos =

Coordinates: 33.41786°S 70.60264°W

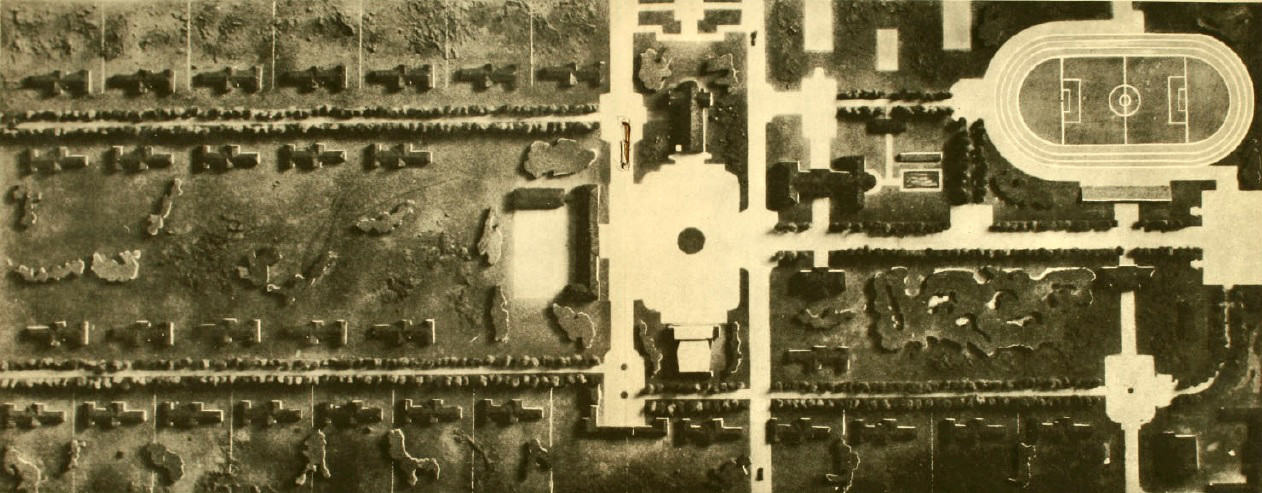
Aerial view of the future Children's City, 1943

The Ciudad del Niño Presidente Juan Antonio Ríos (City of the Child President Juan Antonio Rios), known as Ciudad del Niño Presidente Ríos or only as a City of the Child was a shelter for abandoned children that was established by the Council for Defense of the Child on 23 December 1943 as a proposal of Minister of state and chairman of the Defense of Children Oscar Gajardo Villarroel, was a boarding school with, policlinico, theater, athletic fields, plazas and gardens similar to a city that only children, the proposal was sent to then-President Juan Antonio Rios and was accepted and sponsored by the First Lady Marta Ide Rios. The city was completed in 1943 and was named in honor of the President of Chile at that time not only for being the President if not for that by Provide support to create the Work, the work was supported by several countries that lent support in various Plena World War II as the United States, Britain, Venezuela, Canada, Brazil, Uruguay, Mexico, Ecuador, Colombia, Panama and Paraguay.

Then in 1979 the late President Rivers precisely 33 years ago because the play did not have the same interest in the decades of the 1940s, 1950s and 1960s, and since mid-1990, the Council for Defense of the Child on Sename and decide to sell more land City and fail to manage as it did not support the internización of minors under the law of 2002.

Today the workshops are located in Santiago's Metro Line 2 Metro Station of Santiago de Lo Ovalle near the Barrio Mena, near the station there is City of the Child.

Today on their land are a high school and there is nothing left of the characteristic facade of the City of the Child that today would be located at the height of the whereabouts 16 ¹ / ² of the Gran Avenida José Miguel Carrera.

== Bibliography ==
- García Valenzuela, Hernán. 1943. Ciudad del Niño Presidente Ríos: ellos serán felices. Libro o Archivo de la Biblioteca Nacional sobre el Proyecto, la Inauguración y las personas que ayudaron a crear la Ciudad del Niño Presidente Ríos . Editorial Zig-Zag S.A.. Santiago.

http://www.memoriachilena.cl/temas/documento_detalle.asp?id=MC0030488 (Spanish)

== See also ==
- Juan Antonio Ríos
- Sename
- Consejo de Defensa del Niño
