= Mapocho River =

River in Chile

River Mapocho
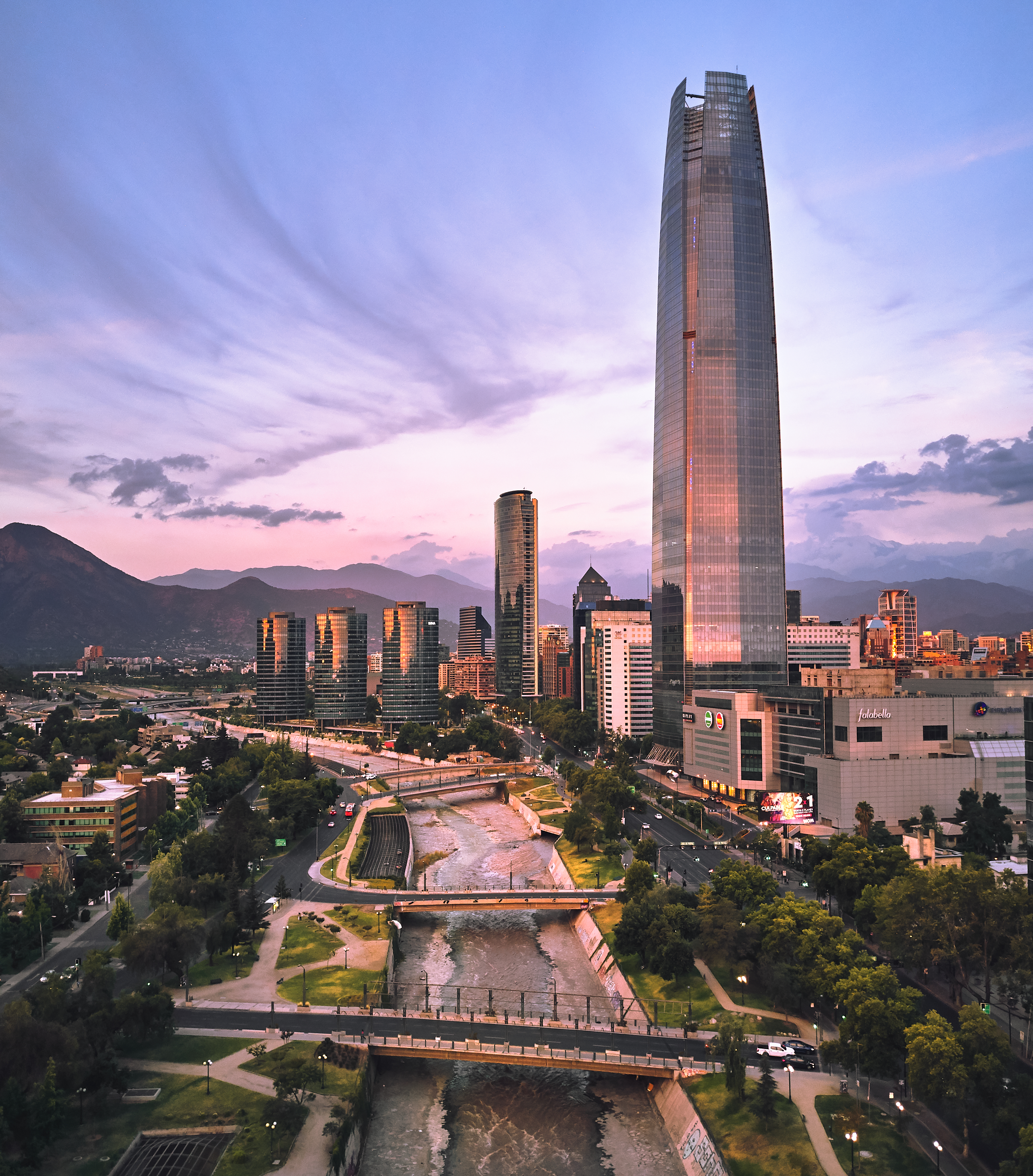
- The Mapocho crossing Providencia district (looking east)

Location
- Country: Chile

Physical characteristics
- Source
  - coordinates: 33°22′25″S 70°23′49″W
  - elevation: 1,200 to 252 m (3,937 to 827 ft)
- Mouth
  - location: Maipo River
  - coordinates: 33°26′37″S 70°49′26″W
- Length: 110 km (68 mi)
- Basin size: 4,230 km^{2} (1,630 sq mi)

The River Mapocho (Spanish: Río Mapocho) (Mapudungun: Mapu chuco, "water that penetrates the land") is a river in Chile. It flows from its source in the Andes mountains onto the west and divides Chile's capital Santiago in two.

== Course ==
The Mapocho begins at the confluence of the San Francisco River and Molina River in the Andes. The main tributary of the former is Yerba Loca Creek, which drains the protected area that bears its same name. Molina River is fed by Iver Glacier, which lies on Cerro El Plomo. A few kilometres westward from its source, the Mapocho receives the waters of the Arrayán Creek and enters to the urban area of Santiago.

The last western spurs of the Andes in this area force a change in the direction of the river, making that it begin to flow toward the south. In the vicinity of Cerro San Cristóbal and just to the side of the Costanera Center project, the river collects the waters of the Canal San Carlos. From here, the river flows in a generally southwesterly direction to Plaza Baquedano area, which is a focal point of the city and the site where formerly the Mapocho split into two branches. The southern branch was turned into a promenade during the early years of the republic, and is now the Avenida Libertador General Bernardo O'Higgins avenue.

The river then turns northwest. In this portion of its course, some of the most meaningful landmarks of the city, arose along its southern bank. Those include the Parque Forestal, the Museo Nacional de Bellas Artes, the Mercado Central and the Estación Mapocho. Farther northwest, two highway bridges connect the north and south sides of the river, which are part of the two branches of the Autopista Central.

Approximately at the longitude of the summit of Cerro Renca, the Mapocho changes its northwesterly flow to a southwesterly direction. From the southern portion of Arturo Merino Benítez International Airport, the river turns south, to its outfall into the Maipo River.

== Cultural role ==
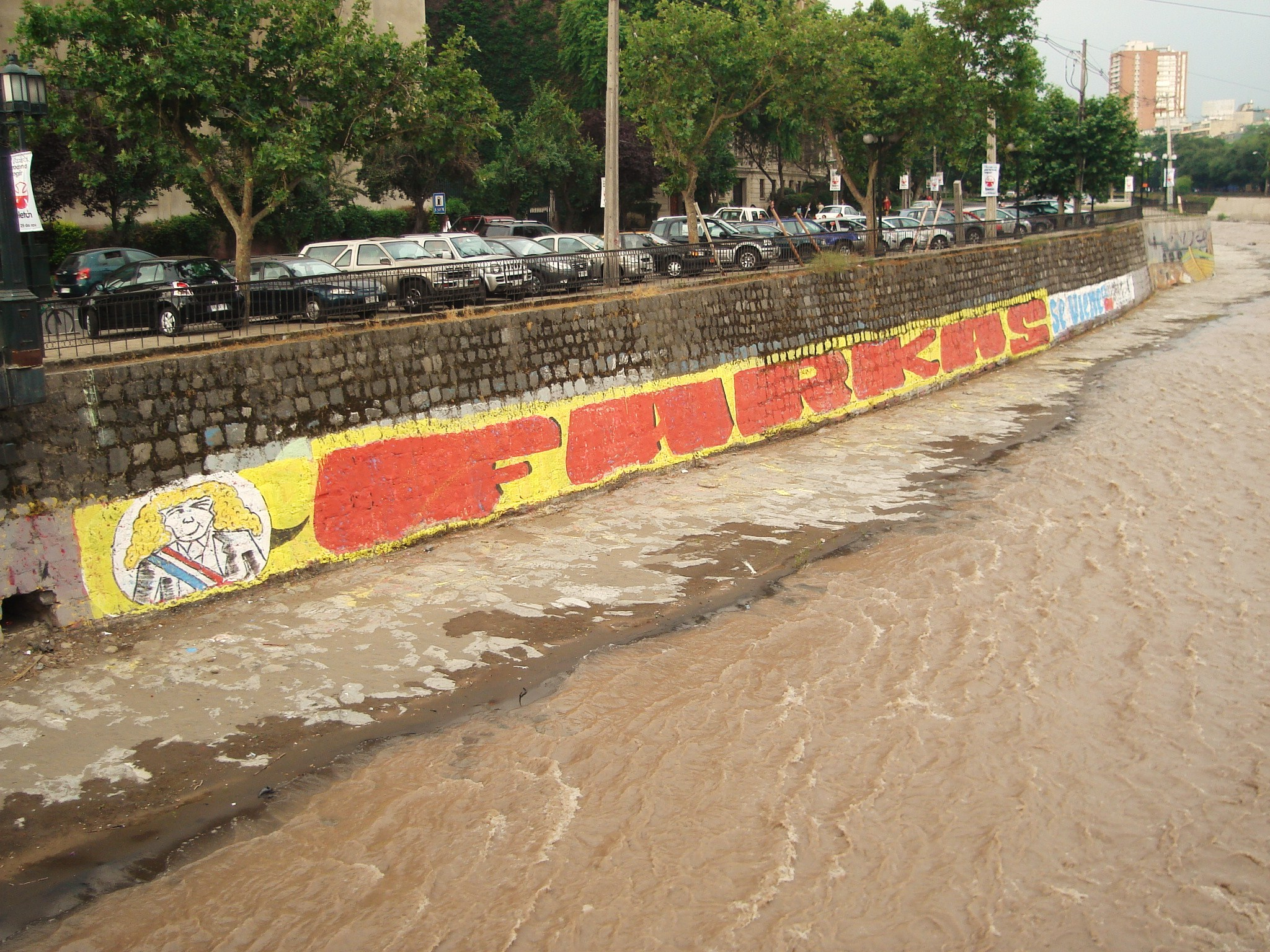
Political propaganda on the walls of the river, in this case a failed presidential candidate Leonardo Farkas

Until the 19th century, the river was the north border of Santiago, hence it was the arrival place for trains from north Chile, at the Estación Mapocho, later also the bus station to the north. Also the Vega Central, the main business place for provisioning Santiago with foods as well as the Mercado Central. Until the first half of the 20th century the (channeled) riverbed was meeting point of homeless people and petty criminals.

Since the 1970s the walls of the "channel" in Santiago, seen daily by thousands "Santiaguinos" have been used for political propaganda. Every year a Hazing Regatta sails the river downwards during the celebrations of the beginning of the year at the University of Chile.

== Pollution ==
In March 2009, only 68% of the wastewater in Santiago was treated, though this increased to 81% by the end of the year.

The Mapocho remains contaminated by household, agricultural and industrial sewage, and by upstream copper-mining waste (from the several copper mines in the Andes, east of Santiago), being dumped unfiltered into the river. Laws force industry and local governments to process all their wastewater, but are loosely enforced. There are now a number of large wastewater processing and recycling plants under construction. There are ongoing plans to decontaminate the river and make it navigable.

== Floods ==
In April 2016, following heavy rain, the swollen river flooded property in Santiago and contaminated the drinking water supply for millions of people.
