= Plaza Baquedano =

Urban square in Santiago, Chile

Coordinates: 33°26′13.20″S 70°38′3.88″W

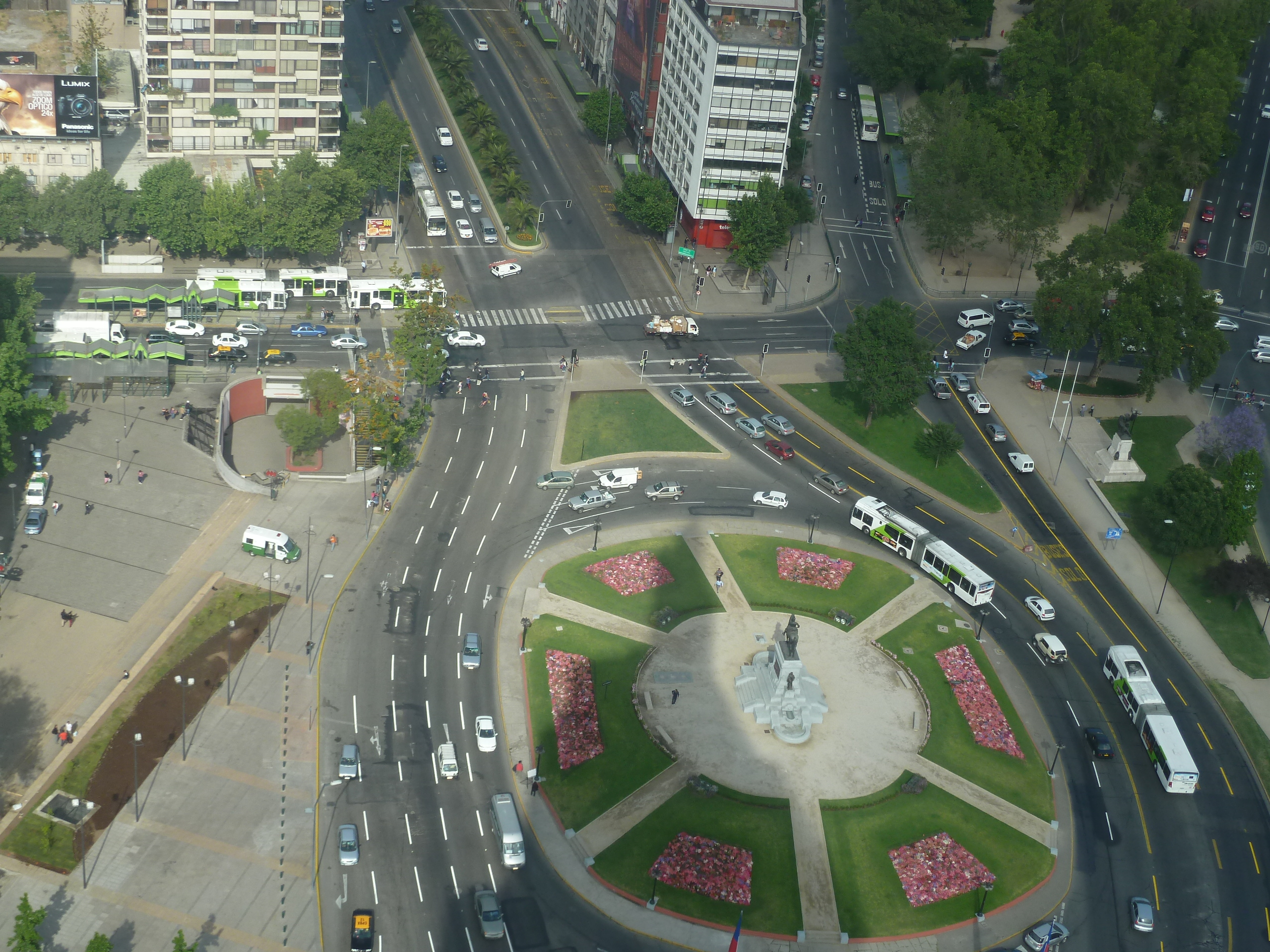
Plaza Baquedano in 2010

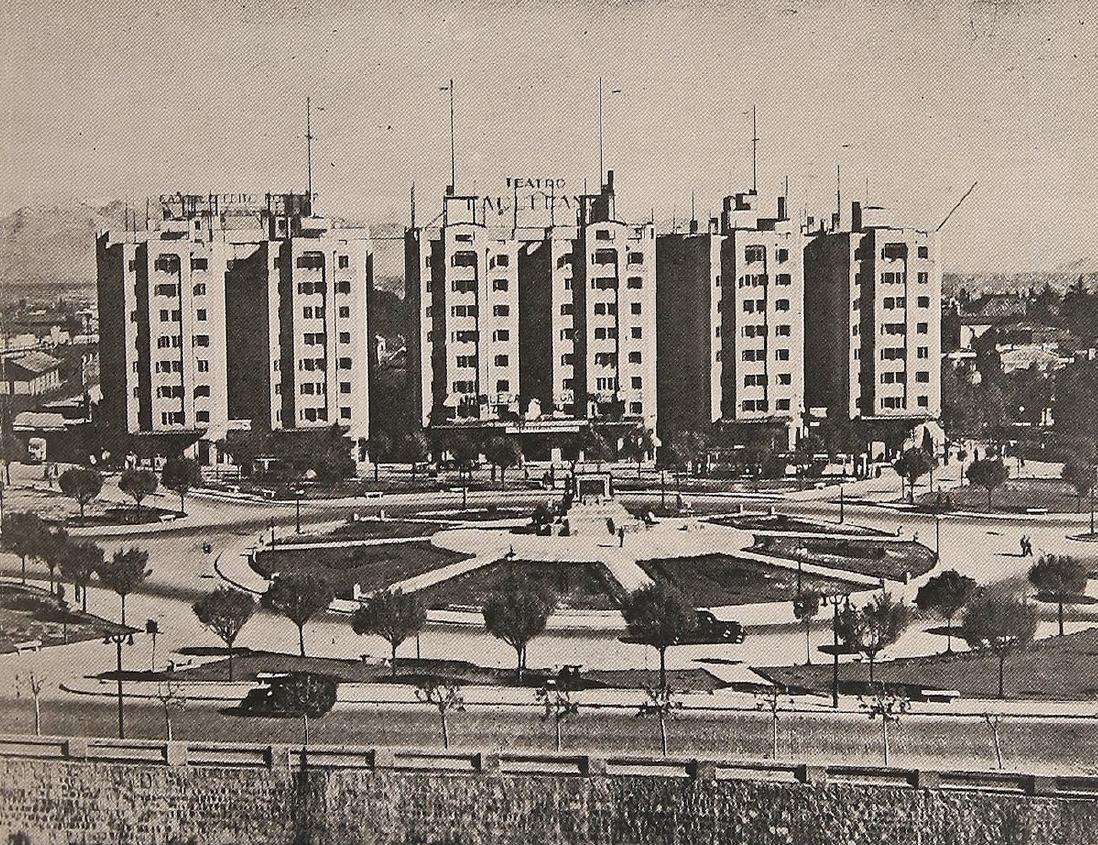
Plaza Baquedano in 1938

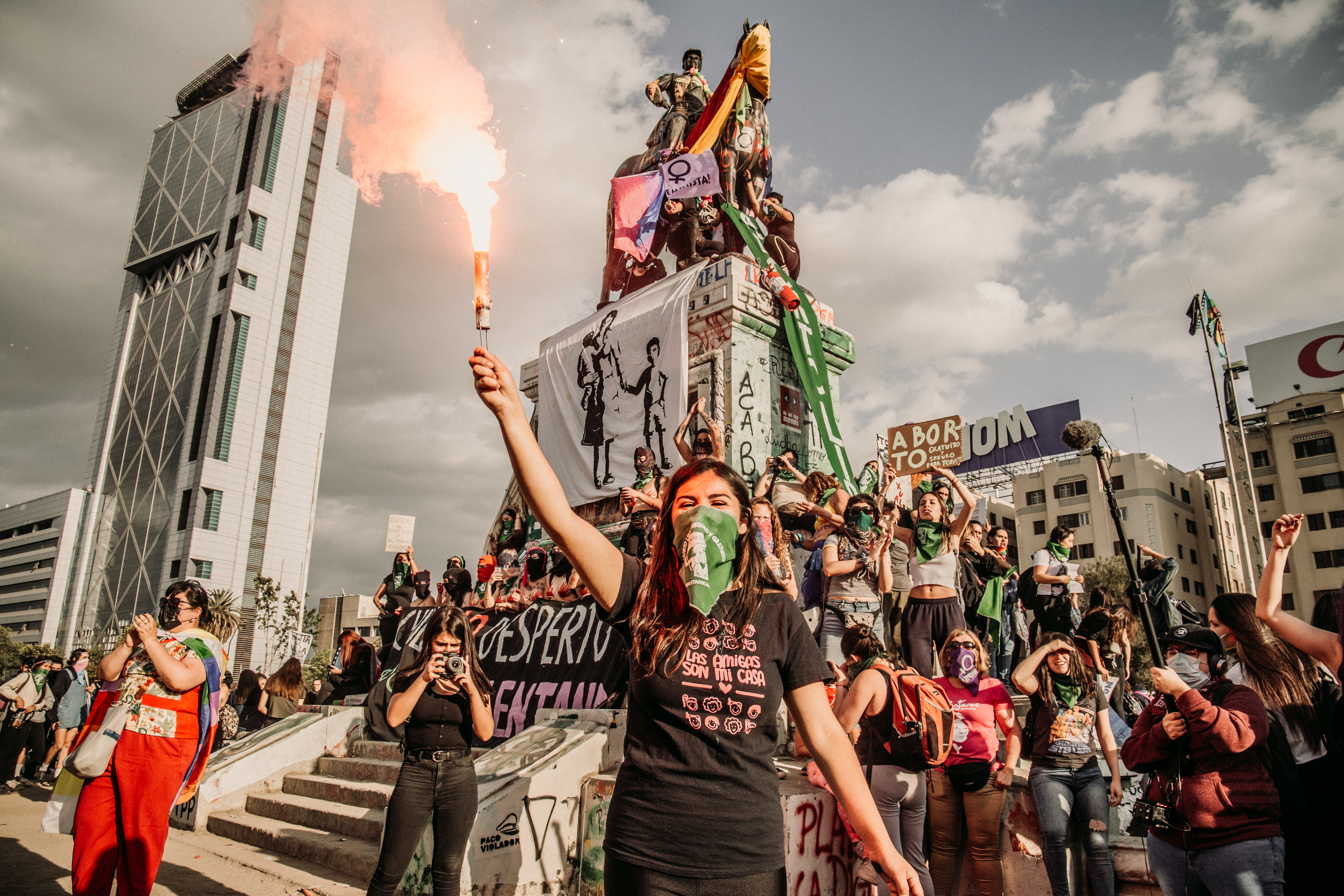
Plaza Baquedano demonstration to commemorate the International Women's Day in 2020.

Plaza Baquedano, commonly known as Plaza Italia, is a major landmark in Santiago, Chile.

The plaza was inaugurated in 1928, being crowned by a monument made by Chilean sculptor Virgínio Arias and featuring General Manuel Baquedano, giving the current name to the urban landmark. It is located where formerly the Mapocho River used to fork. The oval-shaped plaza is the focal point of celebrations and riots in the city. The area also serves as a hub for Santiago's street network. Some of the main streets of Santiago intersect in the area, including Providencia Avenue, Libertador General Bernardo O'Higgins Avenue (best known as Alameda) and Vicuña Mackenna Avenue. A tunnel entrance to the Costanera Norte Highway is close to Plaza Baquedano. Parque Forestal, Balmaceda Park and Bustamante Park converge here.

== History ==
It was established in 1875 as Plaza La Serena and adopted its current name in 1928 to honor Manuel Baquedano. It was originally a traffic circle but its geometric design and functionality have changed since then.

Baquedano metro station is named after Plaza Baquedano.

In the context of the 2019–2021 protests, the protesters dubbed the square as Plaza de la Dignidad (Dignity Square). On March 12, 2021, the four-ton statue of General Baquedano was removed to be restored by the National Council of Monuments, after continuous acts of vandalism by protesters. Attempts to burn and tear down the statue were made on March 5 and 8 respectively, ultimately prompting the authorities to make the decision.
