= Providencia, Chile =

Commune in Santiago, Chile

Providencia
- Commune
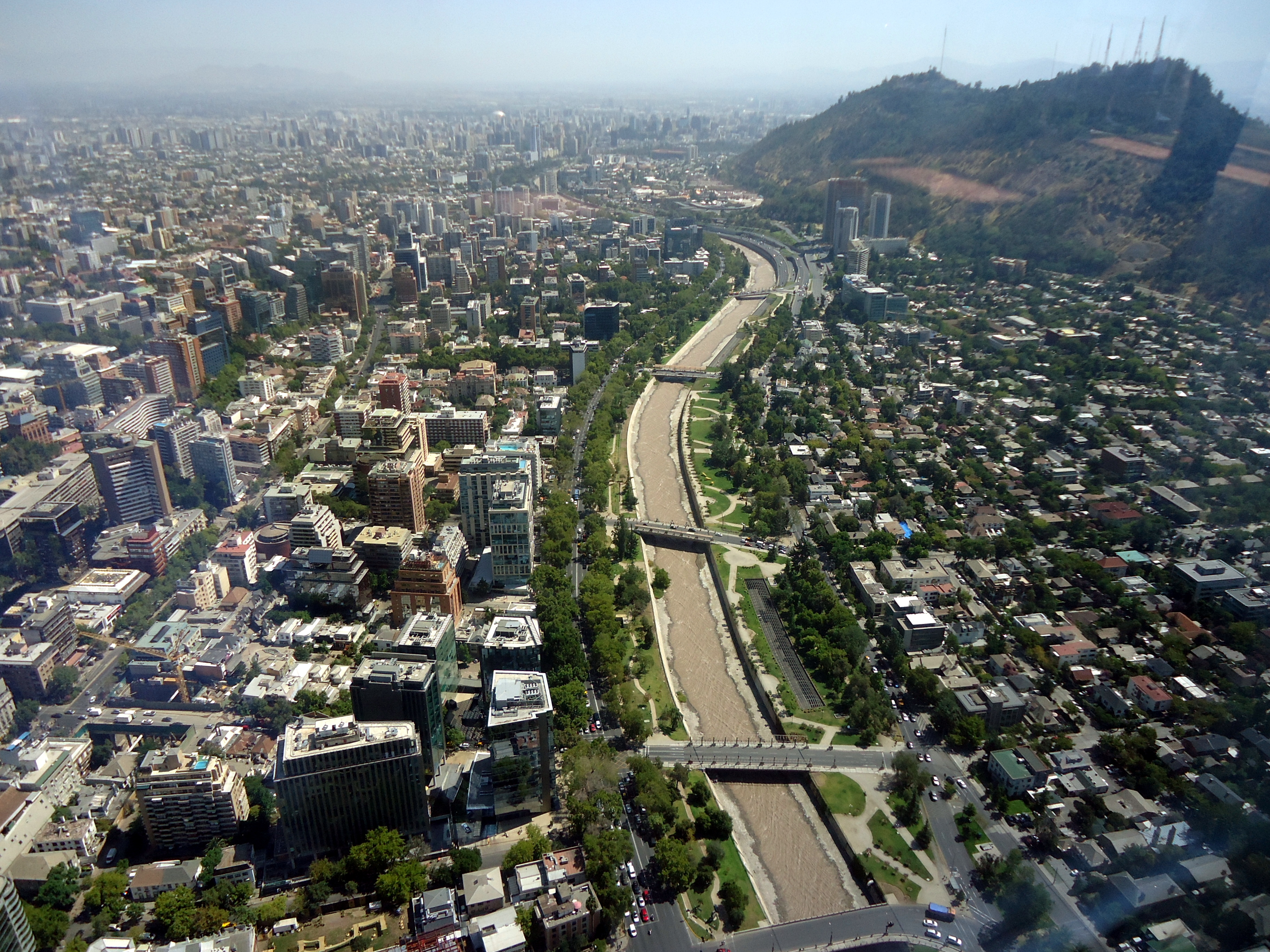
- Mapocho River in Providencia

- Coat of arms Location of Providencia within Greater Santiago Location in Chile
- Coordinates (city): 33°26′S 70°37′W
- Country: Chile
- Region: Santiago Metropolitan
- Province: Santiago
- Established: 25 February 1897

Government
  - Type: Municipality
  - Mayor: Jaime Bellolio (UDI)

Area
  - Total: 14.4 km^{2} (5.6 sq mi)

Population (2024)
  - Total: 143,974
  - Density: 10,000/km^{2} (25,900/sq mi)
- Time zone: UTC-4 (CLT)
  - Summer (DST): UTC-3 (CLST)
- Postal Code: 7500000
- Area code: 56 +
- Website: Municipality of Providencia

Providencia (Spanish pronunciation: [pɾoβiˈðensja], Spanish for "providence") is a commune in the Northeastern zone of Santiago, in Santiago Province in the Santiago Metropolitan Region in Chile. It is bordered by the communes of Santiago to the west, Recoleta to the northwest, Las Condes and Vitacura to the northeast, La Reina to the east, and Ñuñoa to the south. It has 143,974 inhabitants. Providencia is home to a large upper-middle to upper-class population. It contains many high-rise apartment buildings as well as a significant portion of Santiago's commerce. It is notable for its large, old, and elegant houses, once inhabited by the Santiago elite and now mostly used as offices. The municipality is also home to many embassies, including those of Canada, Poland, Hungary, Italy, France, Egypt, Russia, Japan, China, and Uruguay. Providencia has one of the highest human development indexes of any city in Latin America.

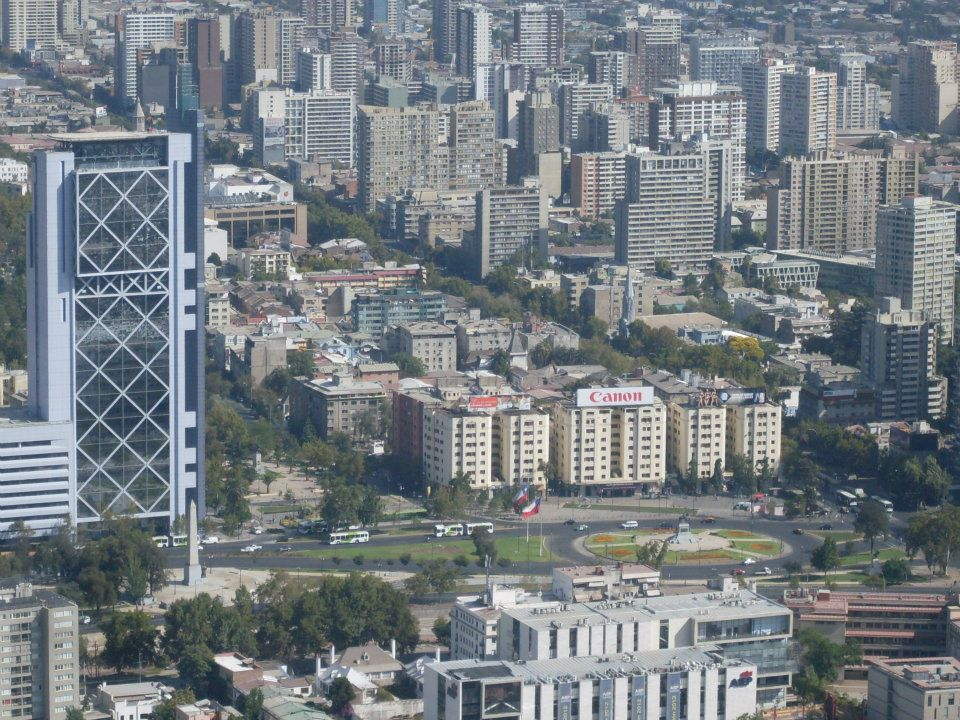
Torre Telefónica Chile and Plaza Baquedano

== Administration ==
As a commune, Providencia is a third-level administrative division of Chile administered by a municipal council, headed by a mayor who is directly elected every four years. The 2024–2028 mayor is Jaime Bellolio (UDI), while the municipal council has the following members:

- María Eugenia Pino García (FA)
- Cristóbal Lagos González (FA)
- Isabel Labbé Martínez (UDI)
- María Carolina Plaza Guzmán (Ind/UDI)
- Valentina Alarcón Chávez (Evópoli)
- María Fernanda Maquieira Borgoño (RN)
- Mauricio Labbé Barría (RN)
- María Antonieta Saa Díaz (PPD)
- Rodrigo Valenzuela Báez (REP)
- Solange Wolleter Dávila (REP)

Providencia belongs to Electoral District No. 10, with Santiago, Ñuñoa, La Granja, Macul and San Joaquín, and to the 7th (Senatorial) District (Santiago Metropolitan Region). It is represented in the Chamber of Deputies of the National Congress by the deputies Gonzalo Winter (CS), Jorge Alessandri Vergara (UDI), Johannes Kaiser (REP), María Luisa Cordero (IND), Lorena Fries (IND), Helia Molina (PPD), Alejandra Placencia (PC) and Emilia Schneider (COM).

The Directorate General of Civil Aviation has its headquarters in Providencia.

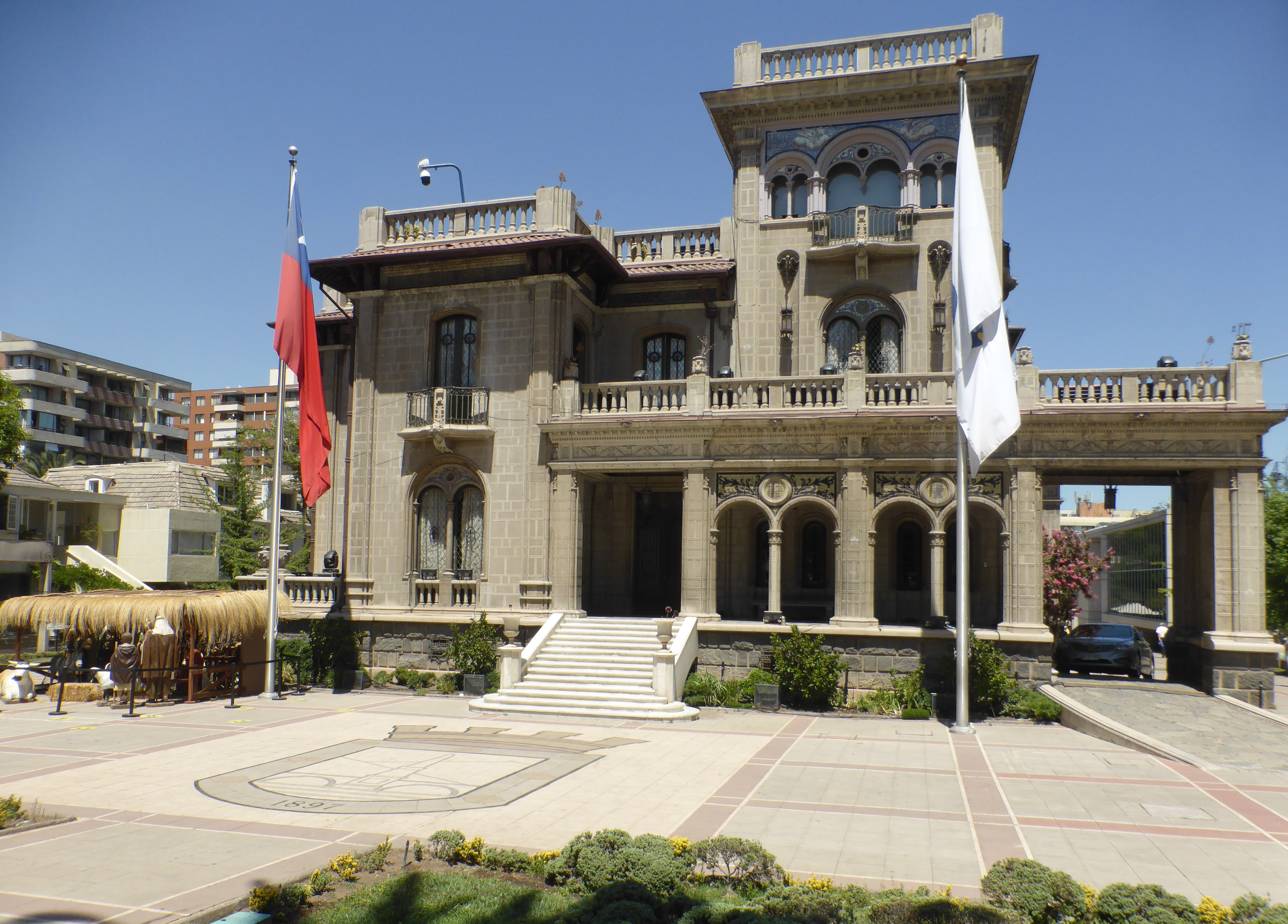
Palacio Falabella, city hall.

== Demographics ==
Historical population
| Year | Pop. | ±% p.a. |
|---|---|---|
| 1875 | 8,006 | — |
| 1885 | 11,408 | +3.60% |
| 1895 | 9,930 | −1.38% |
| 1907 | 8,920 | −0.89% |
| 1920 | 18,708 | +5.86% |
| 1930 | 34,305 | +6.25% |
| 1940 | 51,671 | +4.18% |
| 1952 | 61,642 | +1.48% |
| 1970 | 121,437 | +3.84% |
| 1982 | 115,449 | −0.42% |
| 1992 | 111,182 | −0.38% |
| 2002 | 120,874 | +0.84% |
| 2017 | 142,079 | +1.08% |
| 2024 | 143,974 | +0.19% |
Source: INE, Memoria Chilena

As of the 2024 census, the population is 236,478, of which 48.3% are males, and 51.7% are females. People aged under 15 years old make up 17.0% of the population, and people aged 65 years old and over make up 13.3%. 100% of the population is urban.

- Average annual household income: US$53,767 (PPP, 2006)
- Population below poverty line: 3.5% (2006)
- Regional quality of life index: 83.01, high, 5 out of 52 (2005)
- Human Development Index: 0.911, 4 out of 341 (2003)

=== Ethnic groups ===
As of the 2024 census, Indigenous peoples make up 3.2% of the population, and Afro-Chileans make up 0.7%.

=== Religion ===
As of the 2024 census, 54.0% of the population over 15 years old are Christians (47.6% Catholics, 3.4% Evangelicals or Protestants, and 3.0% other branches), 0.6% are Jews, 0.1% are Muslims, 0.6% are Buddhists, 0.1% are Hinduists, 1.1% are adrehents of other religions, and 43.4% are irreligious.

=== Immigration ===
As of the 2024 census, immigrants make up 11.2% of the population – 7.6% are from South America, 1.1% from North America, 1.8% from Europe, 0.5% from Asia, 0.05% from Africa, and 0.1% from Oceania.

== Sights ==
Providencia is home to Barrio Bellavista, a bohemian neighborhood known for its vibrant community of artists and performers. Barrio Bellavista lies in the shadow of Cerro San Cristóbal, a prominent hill in the city topped by a 22m statue of the Virgin Mary. The northern part of Providencia serves as its financial and commercial hub, centered around Providencia and Nueva Providencia (formerly 11 de Septiembre) avenues, while the rest of the commune features high-end residential developments.

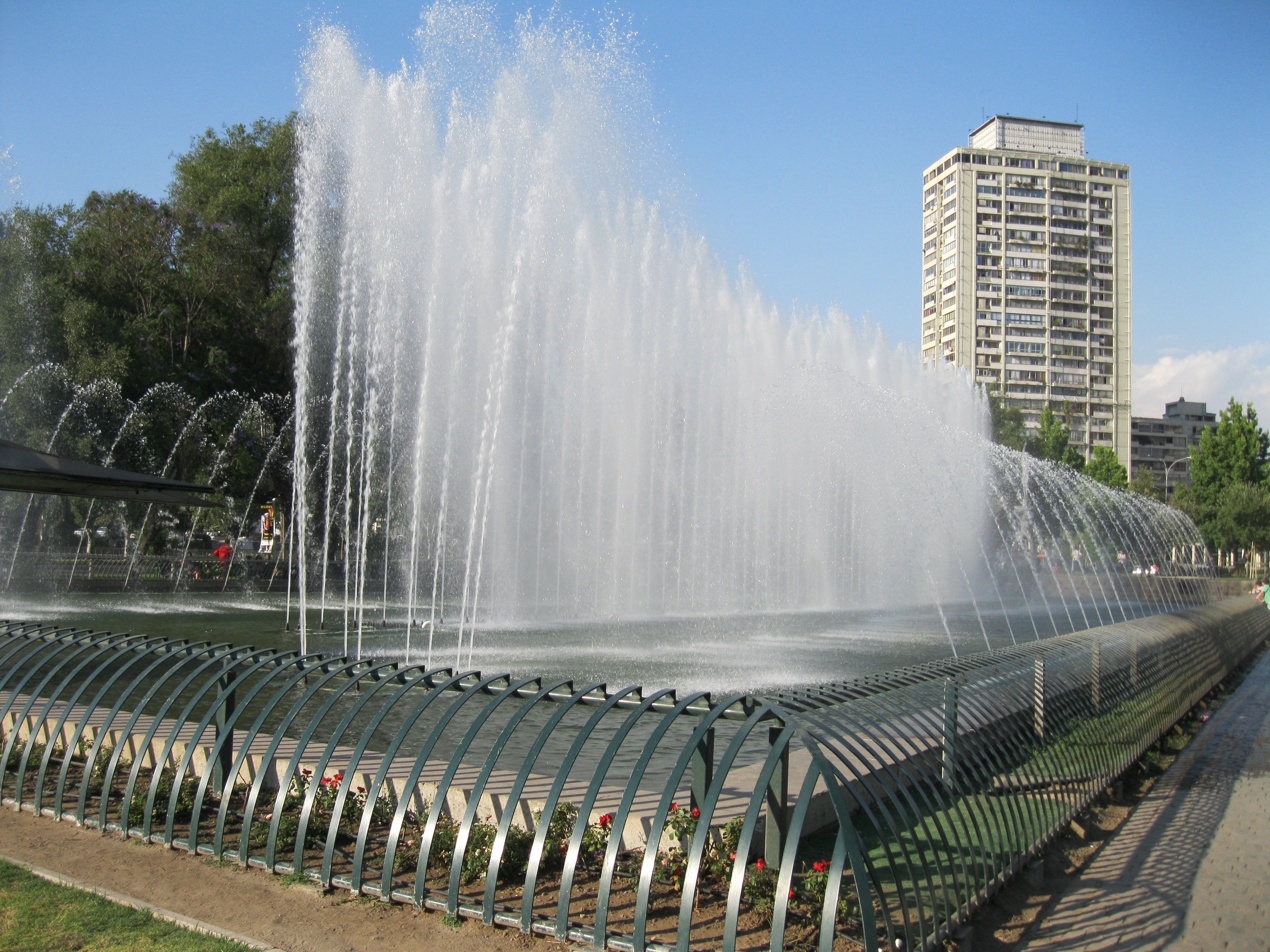
Aviation Fountain, Providencia Square

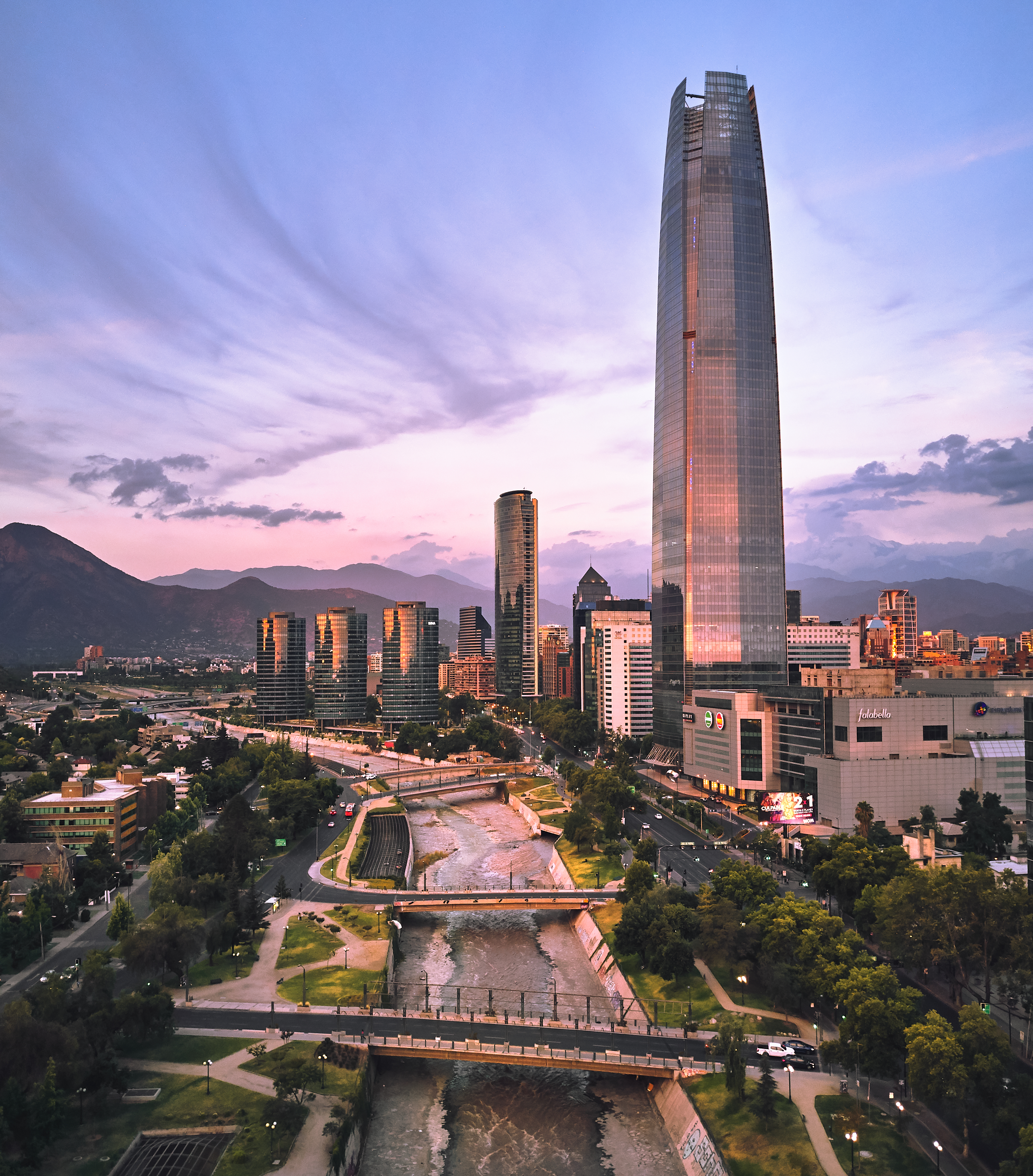
Gran Torre Costanera and Mapocho river in Uruguay Park.

Other notable areas of interest in Providencia include the Metropolitan Zoo; the Teleférico, an aerial gondola that transports passengers from Pedro de Valdivia Norte Street to the top of Cerro San Cristóbal; and the headquarters of several television networks and Radio Cooperativa.

== Transport ==
Line 1 and the planned Line 8 of the Santiago Metro serve Providencia.

== International relations ==
=== International organizations ===
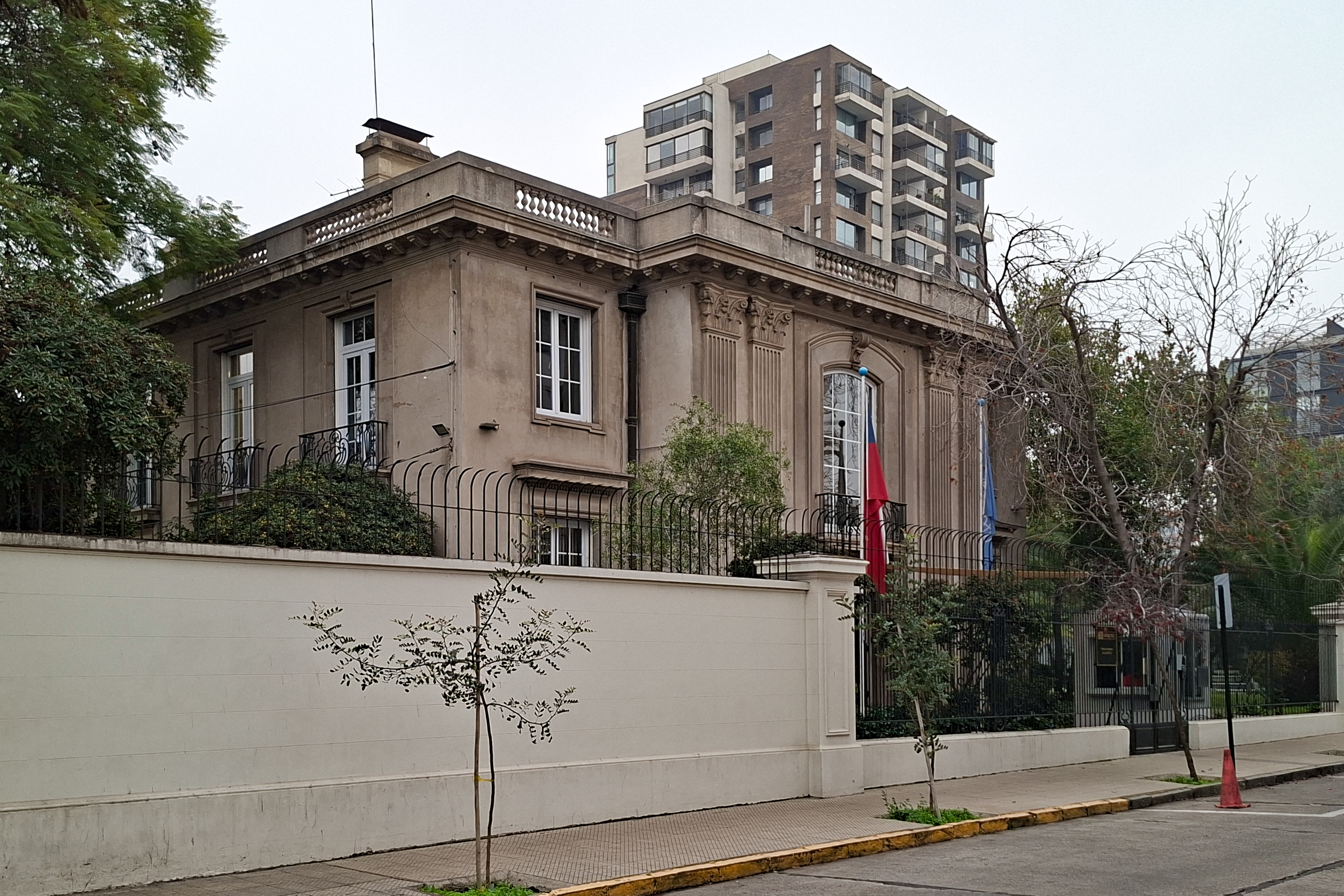
Regional Office for Latin America and the Caribbean of the United Nations Educational, Scientific and Cultural Organization (UNESCO).

The commune hosts the national and Latin American regional headquarters of several international organizations associated with the United Nations, such as the Regional Office for Latin America and the Caribbean of the United Nations Educational, Scientific and Cultural Organization (UNESCO), and the national office of the International Organization for Migration (IOM Chile). Likewise, organizations associated with the Organization of American States, such as the headquarters of the Justice Studies Center of the Americas (JSCA), and the national office of the Inter-American Institute for Cooperation on Agriculture (IICA). In addition to the Technical Program Office of the Organization of Ibero-American States (OEI), and the national offices of the Inter-American Development Bank and CAF - Development Bank of Latin America and the Caribbean.

=== International trade and investment ===
In the field of international trade and investment, the principal actors in Providencia are the chambers of commerce: the Chilean-Argentine Chamber of Commerce, the Chilean-Belgian-Luxembourg Chamber of Commerce (BELGOLUX), the Chilean-Ecuadorian Chamber of Commerce (CAMCHEC), the Spanish Chamber of Commerce (CAMACOES), the Chilean-Finnish Chamber of Commerce, the Chilean-Hungarian Chamber of Commerce, the Franco-Chilean Chamber of Commerce, the Chilean-Polish Chamber of Commerce, the Chilean-South African Chamber of Industry, Commerce and Tourism, and the Chile-Vietnam Chamber of Commerce.

In addition to the international trade and investment promotion agencies: Flanders Investment and Trade (FIT), Hong Kong Trade Development Council (HKTDC Chile Office), Pro Ecuador, the Economic and Commercial Office of Spain in Chile (ICEX), Catalonia Trade and Investment, Andalucia Trade, the Italian Trade Agency (ICE), the Polish Investment and Trade Agency in Santiago (PAIH), and the Vietnam Trade Office.

=== Migration management ===
In matters of international relations and migration management, the commune is home to the Migrant Office of the Municipality of Providencia.

=== Internationalization in higher education ===
In the field of international relations and higher education, the principal actors within Providencia are the Directorate of International Relations of the University of Chile Faculty of Law, the Confucius Institute of the Pontifical Catholic University of Chile, the Directorate of International Relations of Universidad Mayor, the Directorate of International Relations of the Autonomous University of Chile, the Office of International Relations of Finis Terrae University, the Directorate of International Affairs of San Sebastián University, the Directorate of Outreach and International Relations of Gabriela Mistral University, the Subdirectorate of International Relations of Universidad de Las Américas, the International Relations Unit of SEK University, the Student Mobility Program of the Academy of Christian Humanism University, and the Subdirectorate of Internationalization and Institutional Integration of Duoc UC. In addition to the Chilean representations of foreign universities, such as the Center for Mexican Studies of the National Autonomous University of Mexico (UNAM) - Latin America, the Heidelberg Center for Latin America (HCLA), the UC Davis Life Sciences Innovation Center, and the Stanford Program in Santiago.

The commune is home to Chile’s principal national institutions dedicated to research and training in International Relations, such as the Institute of International Studies of the University of Chile, the National Academy of Political and Strategic Studies (ANEPE), the Institute for Advanced Studies of the University of Santiago de Chile, and the Observatory of International Affairs of Finis Terrae University.

=== International cooperation and cultural diplomacy ===
In the field of international cooperation, the principal actors within the commune are the German Agency for International Cooperation (GIZ Chile), and the French Regional Delegation for International Cooperation for South America (DRC). Providencia is also characterized as the national headquarters of binational cultural institutions, such as the French Institute of Chile, the Chinese Cultural Center, the Spanish Cultural Center in Santiago, the Goethe-Institut, the Italian Institute of Culture, the British Council, the Chilean-Swedish Cultural Institute, and the Chilean-Japanese Cultural Institute. In addition to international education agencies such as EducationUSA, the German Academic Exchange Service (DAAD), and Campus France.

=== Embassies ===
- Austria (Embassy)
- Belgium (Embassy)
- China (Embassy)
- Croatia (Embassy)
- Cuba (Embassy)
- Ecuador (Embassy)
- Egypt (Embassy)
- El Salvador (Embassy)
- Spain (Embassy)
- France (Embassy)
- Hungary (Embassy)
- Indonesia (Embassy)
- Italy (Embassy)
- Japan (Embassy)
- Peru (Embassy)
- Poland (Embassy)
- Turkey (Embassy)
- Uruguay (Embassy)

== Notable people ==
- Patricio Aylwin, former president
- Ricardo Lagos, former president
- Gabriel Valdés, former senator
