= Katherine Martorell =

Chilean politician (born 1982)

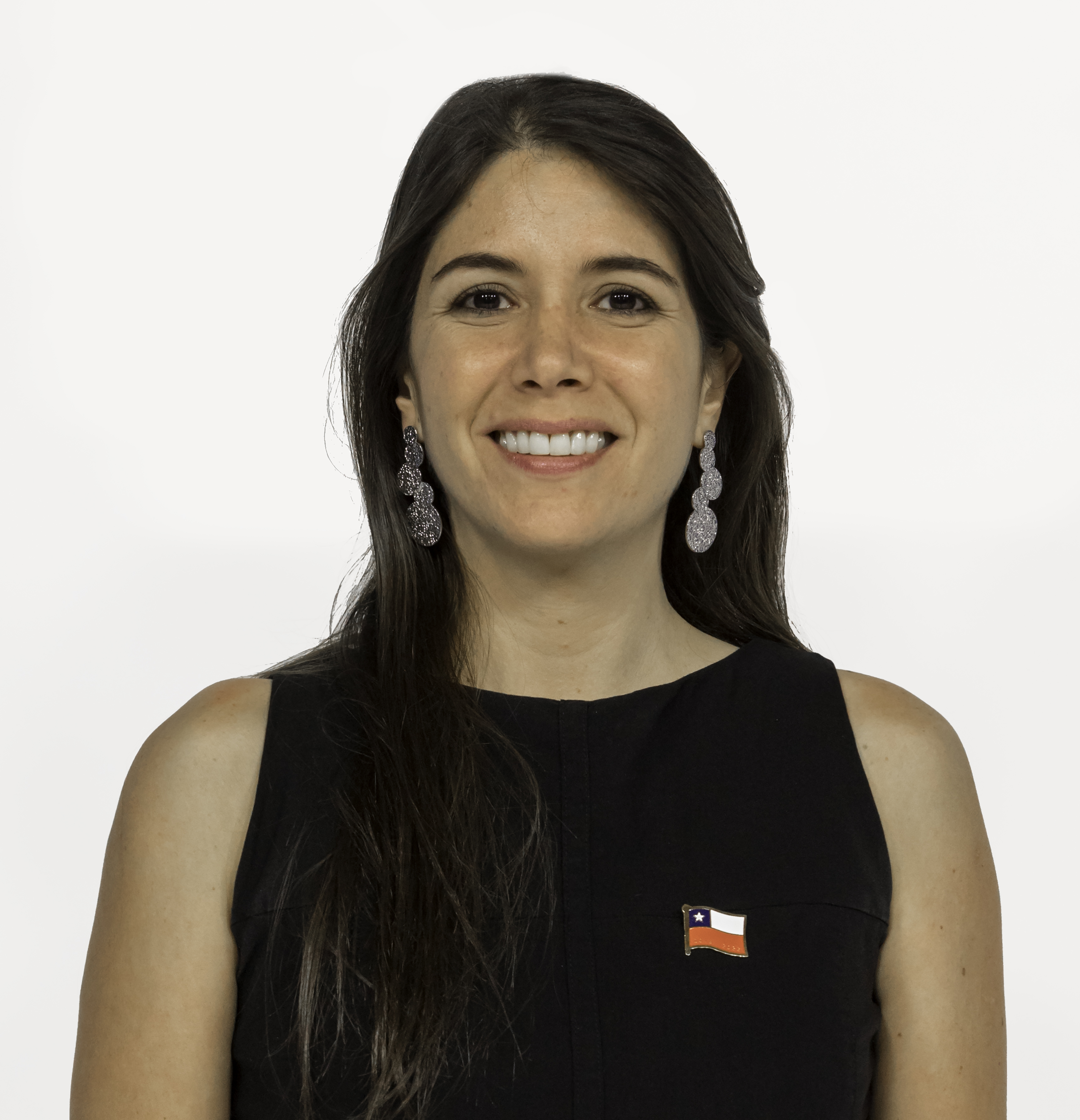

Expert Commissioner of the Constitutional Council
- In office 6 March 2023 – 7 November 2023

Undersecretary for Crime Prevention
- In office 11 March 2018 – 17 August 2021
- Appointed by: Sebastián Piñera
- Preceded by: Oscar Carrasco
- Succeeded by: María José Gómez

Councilwoman of Quinta Normal
- In office 6 December 2012 – 6 December 2016

Personal details
- Born: 18 January 1982 (age 44) Santiago, Chile
- Party: National Renewal
- Spouse: Claudio Pontillo
- Education: Universidad Central de Chile (LL.B); Pontifical Catholic University of Chile (LL.M)
- Occupation: Politician
- Profession: Lawyer

Katherine Denisse Martorell Awad (Santiago, 18 January 1982) is a lawyer and politician from Chile, affiliated with Renovación Nacional (RN). She served as Undersecretary for Crime Prevention during the second administration of President Sebastián Piñera from 2018 to 2021, and was previously a councillor for Quinta Normal between 2012 and 2016.

She has served on the board of the party’s policy institute, the Instituto Libertad, and currently presides over RN’s Supreme Tribunal, the body responsible for upholding internal statutes and party discipline. In that capacity, she announced the formal nomination of Evelyn Matthei as the party’s presidential candidate in January 2025.

The Chilean press often places her within the party’s liberal wing — associated with a pragmatic economic outlook and moderate social stance. This identification has been reinforced by her close political relationship with former President Piñera.

== Family and education ==
Her maternal family is of Arab descent; her grandparents, children of Syrian immigrants, met within the Arab community of Quinta Normal, married, and founded the “Grandes Almacenes Awad.” She was born in Santiago de Chile, daughter of Agustín Manuel Martorell Correa, of Catalan descent, and Angeli del Carmen Awad Awad. Her parents met while working at Codelco and separated when she was eight years old.

She completed her primary studies at Colegio Universitario Inglés and her secondary education at Colegio Carmen Teresiano, both in Santiago.

She read law at the Universidad Central de Chile (UCEN), later earning a master’s degree in regulatory law from the Pontifical Catholic University of Chile.

On 25 June 2022 she married Claudio Pontillo, a public administrator and law graduate.

== Political career ==
Martorell began her public service as legal director and head of community development (DIDECO) at the Municipality of Conchalí. She later served as councillor for Quinta Normal between 2012 and 2016, and ran for parliament in the 2017 parliamentary elections for District 9 of the Santiago Metropolitan Region.

From 2011 to 2014 — during the first Piñera administration — she served as head of the Territorial Management Unit at the Undersecretariat of Telecommunications (Subtel), where she coordinated cross-government programmes on gender, decentralisation, disability, and indigenous affairs.

Between 2015 and 2017 she worked in the private sector as Director of Sustainability and Communities at the telecommunications company Entel.

=== Undersecretary (2018–2021) ===
On 11 March 2018, under the second Piñera administration, she was appointed Undersecretary for Crime Prevention, becoming the first woman to hold the post.

During her tenure she oversaw the creation of the Comisaría Virtual (Virtual Police Station), a digital platform enabling citizens to process administrative matters with Carabineros without attending a police station in person. The platform, launched in 2019, was part of a modernisation drive to digitise public safety services.

At the onset of the COVID-19 pandemic in 2020, the platform became a central instrument of national coordination: all movement permits during lockdown were issued through Comisaría Virtual. Within months it evolved from a bureaucratic tool into one of the State’s most widely used online interfaces, registering millions of daily transactions.

=== Public profile: 2021– ===
Martorell resigned her post on 17 August 2021 to join the presidential campaign of Sebastián Sichel as spokesperson for the Chile Vamos coalition. Following the first-round results, she later joined the José Antonio Kast campaign team in the area of public security.

Between April 2022 and December 2024, she served in the administration of Providencia Mayor Evelyn Matthei, advising on legal and public safety matters. Known for her composed and pragmatic style, she has remained a visible public figure, frequently appearing as a commentator on security and governance.

On 25 January 2023, she was appointed by the Senate as a member of the xpert Commission, tasked with advising the Constitutional Council in drafting a new constitutional text. Within the commission she focused on public security, institutional order, and strengthening autonomous bodies.
