= Nolli =

Nolli is an Italian-language surname. People with the surname include:

- Giambattista Nolli (1701–1756), Italian architect and surveyor
- Italo Nolli (1942–2011), Chilean businessman, fence, and arms dealer
- Rudolfo Nolli (1888–1963), Italian sculptor and stonework contractor who worked mainly in Southeast Asia during the first half of the 20th century
