= Chilean Gendarmerie =

Chilean Gendarmerie Gendarmería de Chile
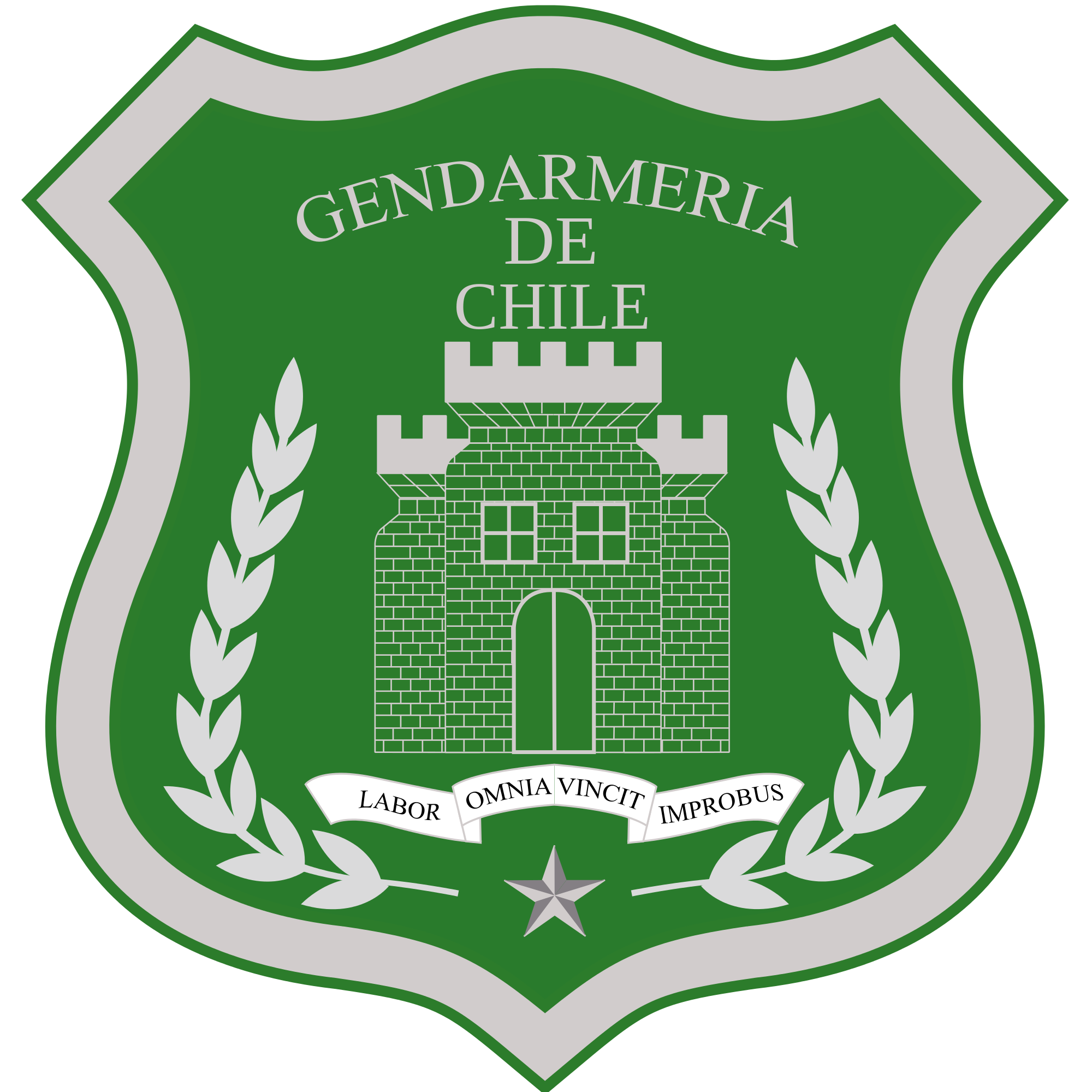

- Abbreviation: GENCHI
- Motto: Labor Omnia Vincit. Deus Patria Lex; Work conquers everything. God, Country, Law

Agency overview
- Formed: November 30, 1929
- Preceding agency: Cuerpo de Gendarmería de Prisiones

Jurisdictional structure
- National agency (Operations jurisdiction): Chile
- Operations jurisdiction: Chile
- Legal jurisdiction: As per operations jurisdiction
- General nature: Gendarmerie; Civilian police

Operational structure
- Overseen by: Dirección Nacional
- Headquarters: Santiago de Chile
- Agency executive: Sebastián Urrua Palma, National Director of the Gendarmerie

Website
- http://www.gendarmeria.cl

The Chilean Gendarmerie (Spanish: Gendarmería de Chile), (abbreviated to GENCHI) is the title of Chile's uniformed national prison service military. The service evolved when Chilean Army units were given police and prison duties under president Carlos Ibáñez del Campo, a move that also created the Carabineros de Chile police force.

Chilean Gendermerie is an armed service under the Ministry of Justice. It has two mottoes, "Labor Omnia Vincit" ("Work conquers everything"), and "Deus Patria Lex" (God, Country, Law). Its symbol consists of a keep with merlons on its roof with two towers to its side.

The service is currently led by Director General Sebastián Urru Palma, appointed to this role by president Gabriel Boric in April 2022.

== Early history ==
Chilean Army units were used for policing and guarding prisons from the time of Chile's independence. Chile's first "professional" prison was built in Santiago in 1843. In 1871 the "Special Guard" was created (Guardia Especial) which was Chile's first prison service separate from the army.

A Gendarme battalion, the Bulnes Battalion, fought as part of the Chilean Army during the War of the Pacific.

In 1892, under the government of Admiral Jorge Montt, the service was called "Special Guards of the Prisons of Chile" (Guardias Especiales de las Prisiones de Chile) and was responsible for prisons, executions, and prisoner transport.

== Modern history ==
In 1911, under the government of Ramón Barros Luco, the Special Guards experienced some reforms and the title "Prison Gendarmerie Corps" was adopted (Cuerpo de Gendarmería de Prisiones). It had the additional duty of guarding prisoners in court. The vast majority of members of this new service were seconded from the Army, including officers and other ranks - the very reason for the current military heritage of today's organization. A law was passed in 1921, Law N° 3.815, concerning the organization of the service. (From 1930 until today November 30 - the day the law took effect after its approval - is considered to be the anniversary of the Gendarmerie.)

A Prison Gendarmerie School was established in 1928 to train personnel, and from 1944 onward, became the officer training school of the service.

From 1929 until 1931, the service was part of the Carabiniers of Chile, the national Gendarmerie proper. During this time, it was known within the carabiniers as the Prison Service, and its members were "Prison Carabiniers". From 1931, the title "Prison Service" was used, and the service regained its independence.

In 1944 an academy was founded, called the Penitentiary School of Chile, which in 1954 became the Technical School of Prison Security Services.

During the dictatorship of General Augusto Pinochet Ugarte, the current title of "Gendarmería de Chile" was adopted, and a new grey-green uniform was adopted which was inspired by German army uniforms of World War II. The Gendarmerie's Penological Education Academy, the staff college of the service for all junior officers, was established in 1997.

== Organizational Structure ==
GENCHI is made up of various departments and units including:

- National Director
  - Sub-Directorate of Administration and Finance
    - Department of Accounting and Budget
    - IT Department
    - Infrastructure Department
    - Logistics Department
    - People Management Department
    - Department of Social Welfare and Quality of Life
    - Department of Health
  - Sub-Directorate of Social Recognition
    - Open System Department
    - Closed System Department
    - Post-Penitentiary Department
    - Department of Statistics and Penitentiary Studies
    - Telematics Monitoring Department
    - Department for the Protection and Promotion of Human Rights
    - Management and Development Unit of the Productive Activity of the Education and Work Centers (CET, Centros de Educación y Trabajo)
  - Operational Sub-Directorate
    - Operational Inspectorate
    - Department of Prison Security
    - Penitentiary Intelligence Department
    - Criminal Investigation Department
    - Department of Prison Control
    - Department of Penitentiary Technologies
  - Gendarmerie School of Chile of General Manuel Bulnes Prieto (Escuela de Gendarmería de Chile del General Manuel Bulnes Prieto)
  - Regional Directorates

Some other units they have include the Special Anti-Riot Group (Spanish: Grupo Especial Antimotines, GEAM), Tactical Operations Section (Spanish: Sección de Operaciones Tácticas, SOT), the High-Risk Transfer Group (Spanish: Equipo de Traslado de Alto Riesgo, TAR), and Special Penitentiary Services Unit (Spanish: Unidad de Servicios Especiales Penitenciarios, USEP)

=== Ranks of the Gendarmerie ===
The Chilean Gendarmerie is a service which is influenced by and actively maintains its historic links with the Chilean army. As a result, it is an armed uniformed service of a military character, and it is organized on a military basis using ranks. However the rank of Director General can be filled by either a veteran officer of the force in either case under the appointment and confidence of the President. The current rank system dates from 2010 and is based on the historical ranks of the service. It is a military institution that since its inception has provided security to the country.

Gendarmes of the ranks
Gendarms of the ranks are those that graduate from the "Gendarme Alex Villagrán Pañinao" Gendarmerie's Penitentiary Formation School.

- Gendarme Alumno - Student Gendarme
- Gendarme - Gendarme
- Gendarme Segundo - Gendarme 2nd Class
- Gendarme Primero - Gendarme 1st Class
- Cabo - Lance Corporal
- Cabo Segundo - Corporal
- Cabo Primero - Corporal First Class
- Sargento Segundo - Sergeant
- Sargento Primero - Staff Sergeant
- Suboficial - Sub-Officer
- Suboficial Mayor - Senior Sub-Officer

Officers
All future officers study at the "Pres. Gen. Manuel Bulnes Prieto" Gendarmerie Academy in Santiago de Chile and upon graduation are commissioned as sub-lieutenants.

- Aspirante a Oficial - Aspirant
- Subteniente - Sub-lieutenant
- Teniente Segundo - Second Lieutenant
- Teniente Primero - First Lieutenant
- Capitan - Captain
- Mayor - Major
- Teniente Coronel - Lieutenant Colonel
- Coronel - Colonel
- Subdirector Operativo - Operational Sub-director (Brigadier of the Gendarmerie)
- Director National - National Director (General of the Gendarmerie)

The Gendarmiere also maintains a civilian technical and administrative corps, and although they report to both officers and gendarmes, they wear no uniforms at all.

=== Rank insignia ===
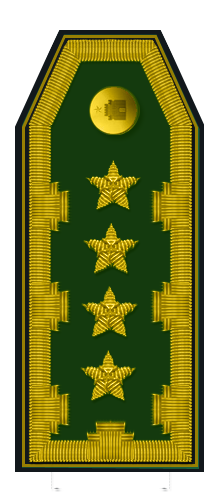
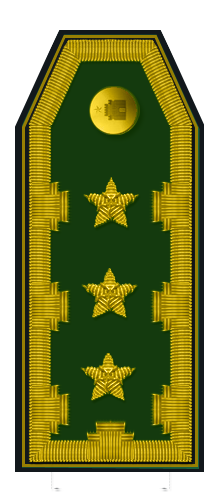
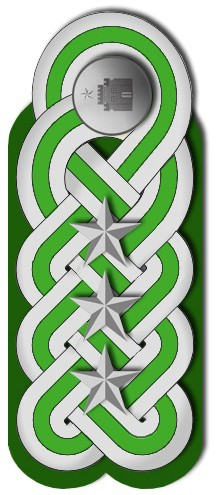
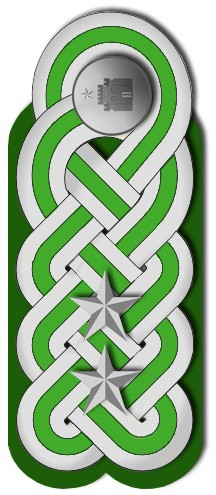
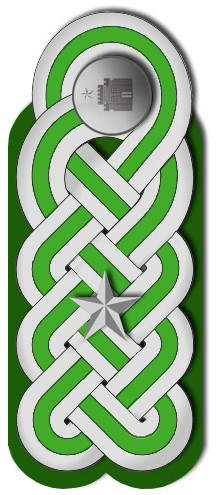
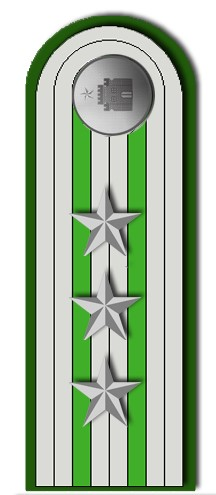
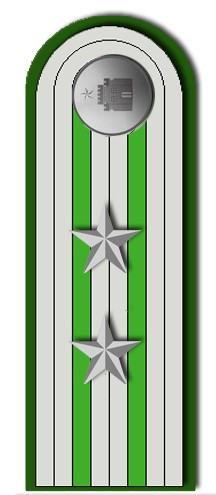
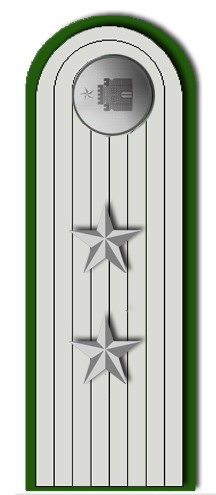
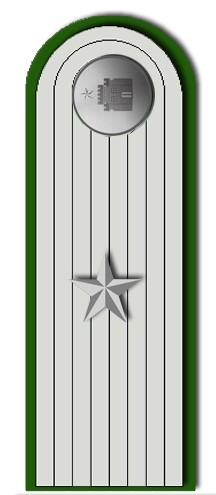
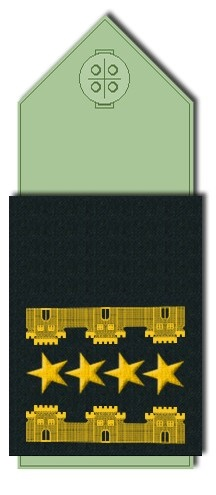
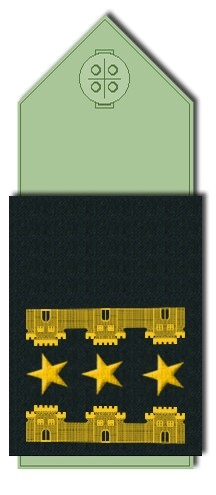
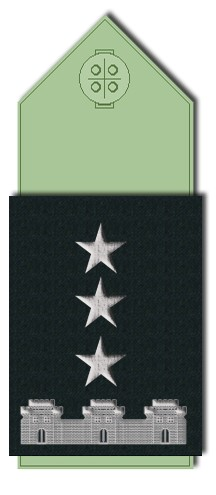
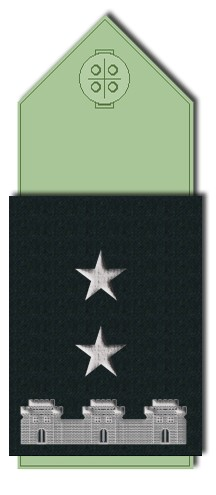
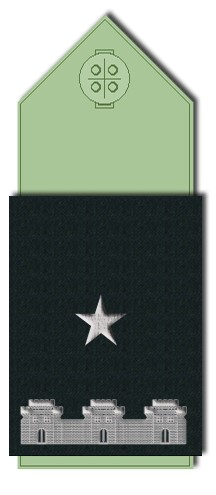
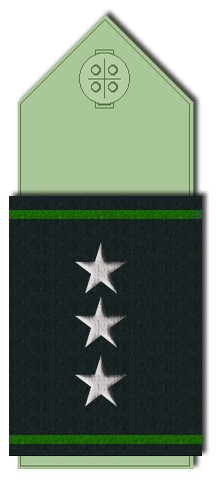
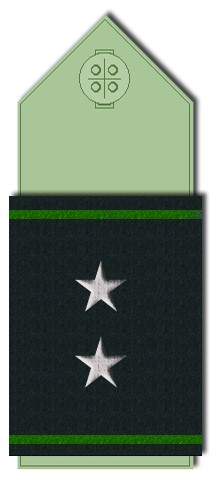
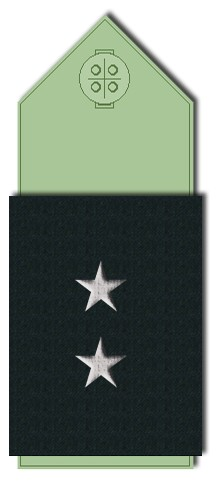
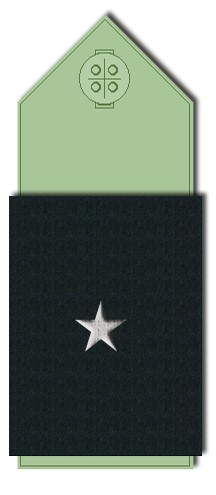
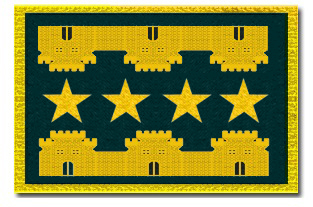
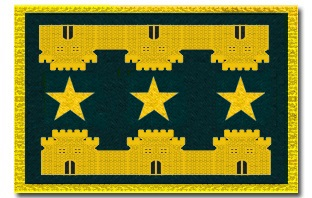
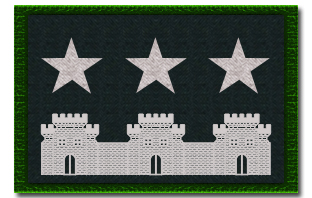
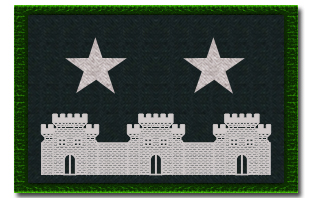
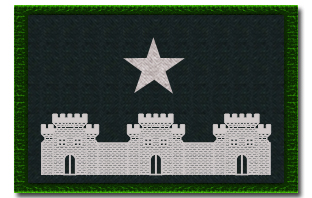
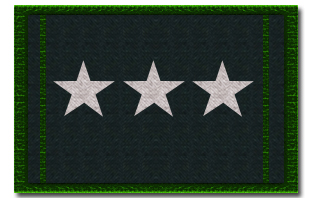
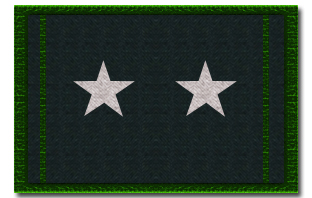
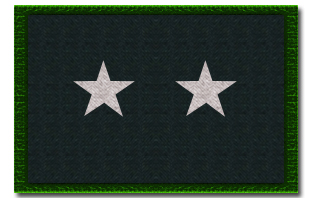
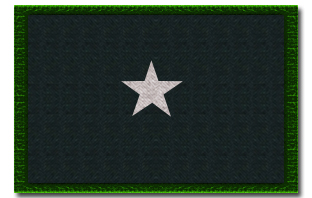
Dress	High Command		Senior officers	Head officers		Junior officers				Student officers
Uniform coat
Shirt; Raincoat; Parka
Inside
Ranks	Director nacional	Subdirector operativo	Coronel	Teniente coronel	Mayor	Capitán	Teniente 1°	Teniente 2°	Subteniente	Aspirante a oficial
Abbreviation	DIREC NAC	SDO	CRNL	TTE CRNL	MAY	CAP	TTE 1°	TTE 2°	SUB TTE	A.A.O.O

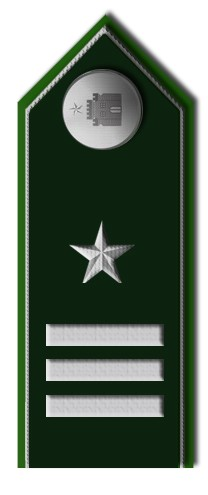
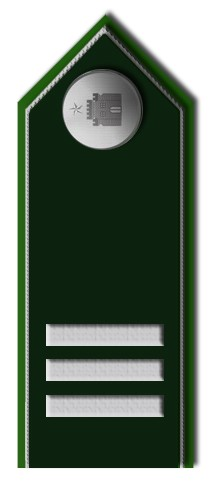
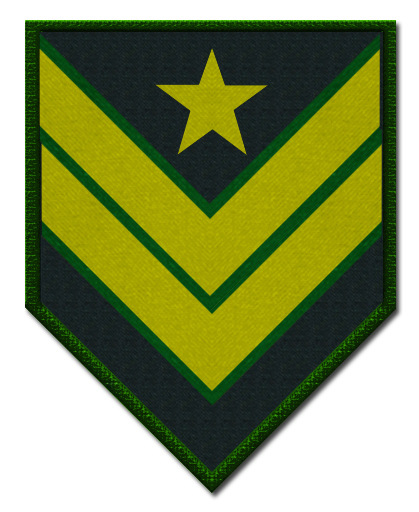
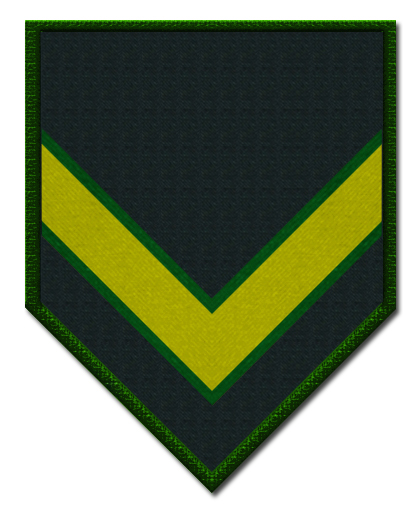
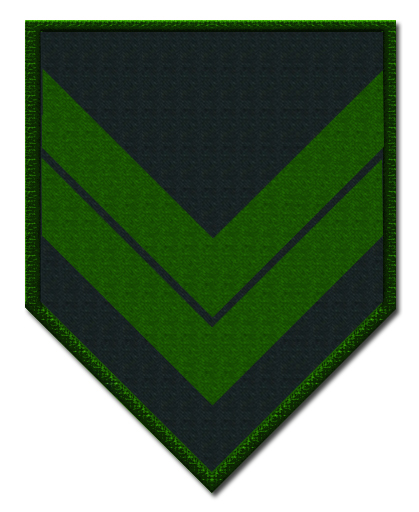
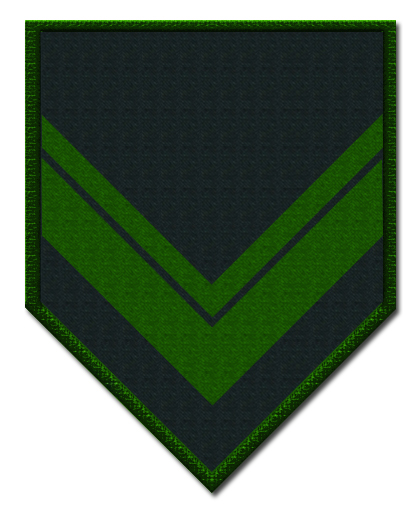
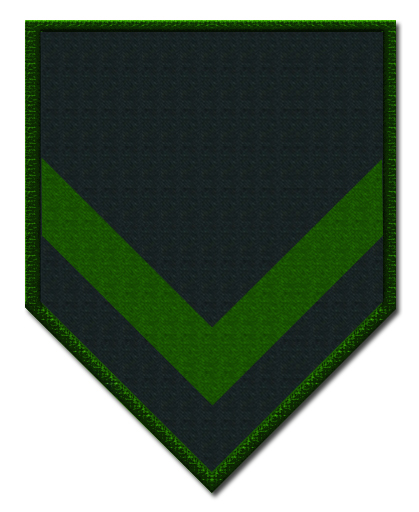
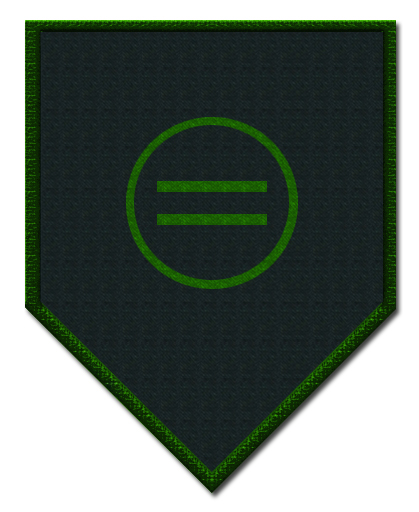
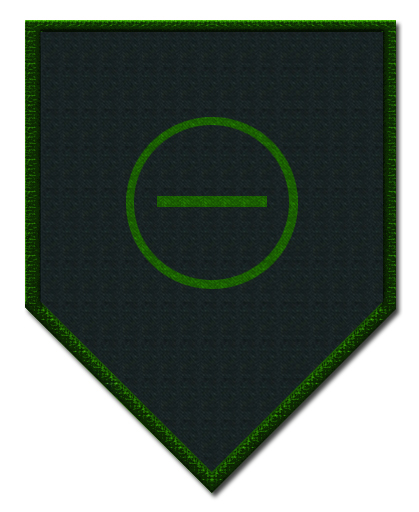
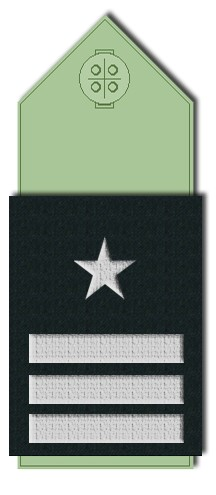
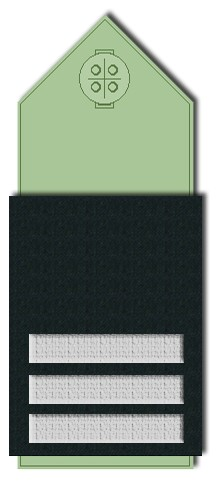
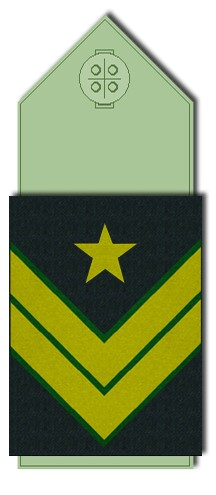
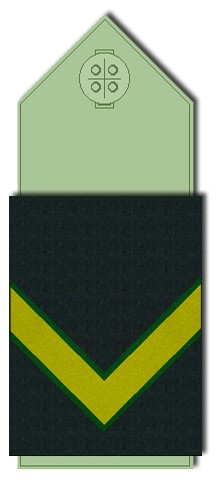
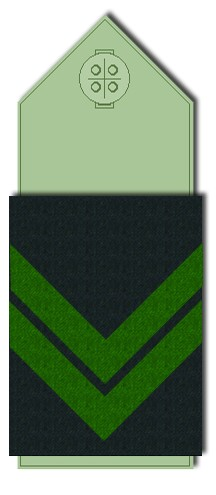
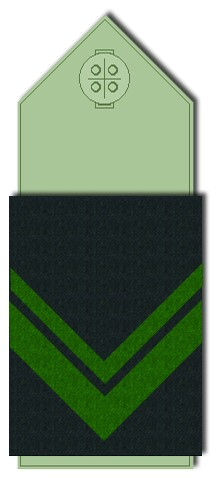
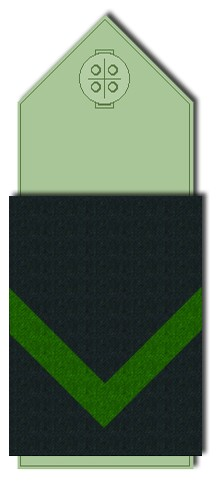
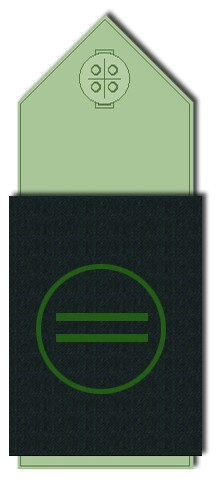
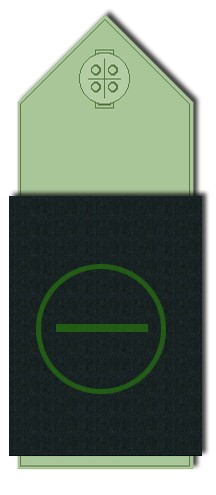
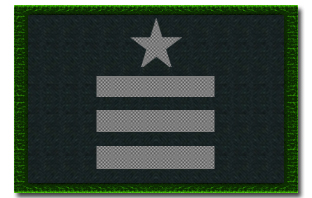
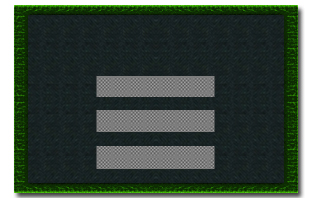
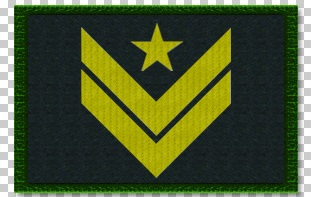
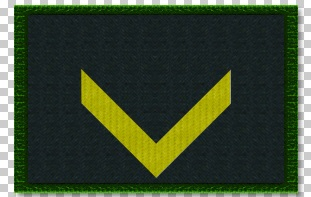
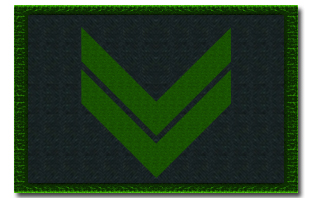
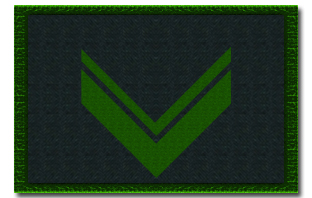
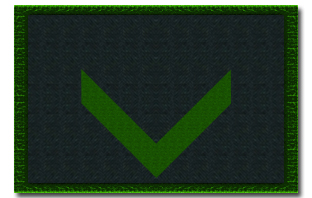
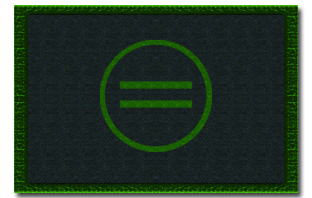
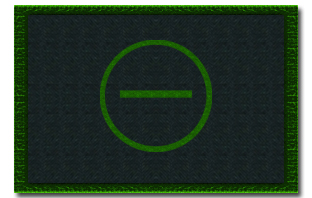
Dress	Warrant Officer	NCOs			Corporals			Gendarms			Students
Uniform coat
Shirt; Raincoat; Parka
Inside
Ranks	Suboficial Mayor	Suboficial	Sargento 1°	Sargento 2°	Cabo 1º	Cabo 2º	Cabo	Gendarme 1°	Gendarme 2°	Gendarme	Gendarme Alumno

== See also ==
- Carabineros de Chile
- Investigations Police of Chile
- Crime in Chile
