= Carabineros de Chile =

Gendarmerie of Chile

Carabiniers of Chile Carabineros de Chile

- Common name: Carabineros
- Motto: Orden y Patria "Order and Fatherland"

Agency overview
- Formed: 27 April 1927; 99 years ago
- Preceding agencies: Cuerpo de Carabineros; Policía Fiscal; Policía Rural
- Employees: 51,728
- Annual budget: US$1.6 billion

Jurisdictional structure
- National agency: Chile
- Operations jurisdiction: Chile
- General nature: Gendarmerie

Operational structure
- Overseen by: Dirección General
- Headquarters: Alameda 1196; Santiago Centro, Santiago
- Agency executive: Ricardo Yáñez, General Director
- Parent agency: Ministry of the Interior and Public Security

Website
- www.carabineros.cl

The Carabineros de Chile (lit. 'Carabiniers of Chile') are the Chilean national gendarmerie, who have jurisdiction over the entire national territory of the Republic of Chile. Created in 1927, their mission is to maintain order and enforce the laws of Chile. They reported to the Ministry of National Defense through the Undersecretary of Carabineros until 2011 when the Ministry of the Interior and Public Security gained full control over them. They are in practice separated fully from the three other military branches by department but still are considered part of the armed forces. Chile also has an investigative police force, the Investigations Police of Chile, also under the Interior and Public Security Ministry; a Maritime Police also exists for patrol of Chile's coastline.

== History ==
The origins of the Carabiniers can be traced back to night watchmen such as the Dragones de la Reina (Queen's Dragoons) (created in 1758 and later renamed the Dragoons of Chile in 1812) and other organizations that fulfilled functions such as the watch and local policing.

Later, cities such as Santiago and Valparaíso created their own city police forces. In 1881 the Rural Police (Policía Rural) was created for the rural areas of the country. However, the main problem with these police services was that they were dependent on local authorities for day-to-day decision making. This led to local officials abusing this power for their own political ends. In 1896 the Fiscal Police (Policía Fiscal) was created to serve the cities.

The first policing organization with the name "Carabiniers" was the Corps of Carabineros, in Spanish Cuerpo de Carabineros (with similar meaning as the Italian Carabinieri), formed in 1903 to bring law and order to the conflictive Araucanía region of Southern Chile (then much larger than today's region), formerly the Gendarme Corps, which would later be merged with the Army's 5th Carabineros Regiment and the Rural Police. The Carabinier Regiment was then a Chilean Army unit, thus the reason why the Carabineros of today sport military ranks and insignia. In 1908 the Carabineros' School (Escuela de Carabineros, currently located in Providencia) was created, which until 1935 trained all officers and non-commissioned sworn personnel.

=== Carabineros de Chile (1927) ===
On April 27, 1927, President Carlos Ibáñez del Campo merged the Fiscal Police, the Rural Police, and the existing Corps of Carabineros to form the Carabineros de Chile, one unified, paramilitary and national security institution under the direction of the national government. The organization still carries the name given to it by Ibáñez, who became the Carabineros' first Director General. In 1929 its official coat of arms – two white crossed carbines in a green shield – was formally adopted. The service in 1930 became one of the pioneer mobile police forces in Latin America. By 1933 the Investigations Police of Chile was created in the basis of the investigations service. The roots of today's NCO School began in 1934 when in Santiago's Macul commune, the service's mounted command began training NCOs and enlisted personnel independently. In 1939 the service received its own staff college, the Police Sciences Academy, and its own equestrian demonstration unit, the Cuadro Verde, and the mounted training squadron began the present day NCO School in 1951.

The Air Operations Prefecture, the air arm of the service, was raised in 1960.

In 1962 it became the first Chilean uniformed service to include women in its ranks. The next year, the Children and Fatherland Foundation was formed as its social responsibility arm for troubled kids and preteens.

=== Military dictatorship of Chile (1973–1990) ===
In 1973, the Carabineros, headed by General Cesar Mendoza, later appointed Director General, joined the Chilean coup of 1973 under the lead of the Army, Navy and Air Force leaders, that overthrew President Salvador Allende. As such, the Carabineros' commander was a formal member of the Military Government Junta, as well as members of the institution taking on administrative roles, such as being in charge of the Ministry of Education.

In 1974, formal command of the service was handed over to the Chilean Ministry of National Defense, and it was integrated into the ranks and traditions of the Chilean Armed Forces as a result. Until 2011, this was the case for the service, from that year onward it is a part of the Ministry of the Interior and Public Security.

The Basic Training Center, which trains future personnel of the other ranks, was created in 1979.

In April 1989, the Glory and Victory (Gloria y Victoria) monument was inaugurated on the Alameda during a ceremony presided over by Director General Rodolfo Stange. The monument serves as a memorial to uniformed Carabineros who lost their lives in the line of duty, honoring their service and sacrifice in maintaining public safety.

=== Transition to democracy (1990s) ===
During the period of transition to democracy, Carabineros left power in 1990 and began a process of institutional modernization and adaptation to a democratic framework. The force shifted its focus from the political role it had assumed during the military regime to functions centered on public order, crime prevention, and community-oriented policing. This period also marked the beginning of reforms in training, accountability, and transparency, alongside efforts to strengthen relations with civil society and improve the public image of the institution.

==== Creation of O.S.10 ====
In 1994, Carabineros de Chile established the Department of Private Security, Arms and Explosives Control (Departamento de Seguridad Privada, Control de Armas y Explosivos), known as O.S.10, with the purpose of regulating and overseeing private security services, as well as controlling the use and possession of firearms and explosives in the country. The unit’s functions include authorizing and supervising private security companies, approving training programs for security personnel, and ensuring compliance with legal standards regarding security operations. It also carries out inspections, applies sanctions when necessary, and works in coordination with other state institutions to maintain public safety and prevent the misuse of weapons.

==== Preventive Security Quadrant Plan ====
The Preventive Security Quadrant Plan (Plan Cuadrante de Seguridad Preventiva) was launched in 1998 as a community-oriented policing strategy aimed at improving citizen security through territorial organization and increased police presence. Under the plan, urban areas are divided into geographic "quadrants," each assigned a fixed number of officers and patrol vehicles to respond to emergencies and engage in preventive patrols. The initiative emphasizes direct contact between police officers and residents, allowing for better identification of local security needs and fostering trust between the community and Carabineros. Over the years, the plan has expanded to multiple regions of Chile and has been adapted to address changing patterns of crime.

=== Launch of the Virtual Police Station ===
In 2019, the Carabineros de Chile launched the Virtual Police Station (Comisaría Virtual) as part of the Safe Streets program during the second administration of President Sebastián Piñera. The platform allows citizens to report crimes, request certificates, obtain safe-conduct permits, submit anonymous information, and initiate family reunification processes, providing a centralized and secure online interface for accessing Carabineros' services.

=== 2019–2020 protests ===
The role of Carabineros during the 2019 Chilean protests has been the subject of several reports by human rights organizations due to their alleged use of deliberate excessive force. These organizations have also received reports of torture, sexual abuse and rape. The National Institute of Human Rights (INDH) reported a total of 232 eye injuries by the 25th of November, 163 as a result of rubber bullets. Regarding the use of rubber bullets Sergio Micco, the director of the INDH, said that the organization had observed over 161 demonstrations in which they were used despite it being against protocol because of a lack of physical danger to carabineros.

On March 2026, José Antonio Kast then President of Chile, proposed a legislation that would pardon members of the Carabineros de Chile indicted for violence against protesters in the Social Outburst. The suggested measure would decrease access to justice and strengthen the suppression of dissent.

== Mission ==
The Carabineros' mission is to maintain or re-establish order and security in Chilean society through civic education, service to the community, police work, and in a war situation, to act as a military force (all their members have military training). Under the current Chilean Constitution the Carabineros are integrated directly into the Armed Forces in a state of emergency to better guarantee the public order.

There is also an Elite Corps in charge of security in La Moneda Palace and for the President – the Presidential Guard Group whose cavalry troop is one of two horse guards units of the Republic, the latter having been raised recently and also serves as the youngest, and also sports a foot guards infantry battalion.

The National Band of the Carabineros, the premiere representative marching band of the service (created in 1929), occasionally performs on state occasions and during the Guard Mounting at the La Moneda Palace and Citizenry Square on selected days with the Guard Group.

== Emergencies ==
The emergency number of the police is 133 which is connected to the Central Communications (CENCO), closest to the nearest location of a police station.

This number will provide medical help, police or fire support. If one would need to communicate directly with any of these services this list of numbers will be useful:

- 132: This number connects directly to the Fire Station closest to the residence concerned, under the Chilean National Firefighters Council's constituent fire services
- 131: This number connects to the Emergency Medical Care Service or SAMU
- 134: This number connects to the Investigations Police of Chile or PDI
- 137: This number connects to the Maritime Rescue Unit (Navy)

Additional phone numbers are also designated to Central Communications for specific queries:

- 135: drugs
- 139: general information, weather and traffic
- 147: child abuse and other related crimes
- 149: family-related crimes

== Equipment ==
=== Firearms ===
Model	Type	Origin
FAMAE revolver	Revolver	Chile
Taurus Model 82	Revolver	Brazil
Ruger P90	Semi-automatic pistol	United States
SIG Sauer P220	Semi-automatic pistol	Switzerland
Glock	Semi-automatic pistol	Austria
Heckler & Koch MP5	Submachine gun	Germany
Uzi	Submachine gun	Israel
FAMAE SAF	Submachine gun	Chile
Benelli M4	Shotgun	Italy
Hatsan Escort	Shotgun	Turkey
IWI Galil ACE	Assault rifle	Chile
M4 carbine	Assault rifle	United States
Heckler & Koch MSG90	Sniper rifle	Germany
Blaser R93	Sniper rifle	Germany
SIG Sauer SSG 3000	Sniper rifle	Switzerland
Barrett M82	Sniper rifle	United States

=== Aircraft inventory ===
Carabineros de Chile operate 35 aircraft in support of their operations, including 18 helicopters. Recently, 5 Augusta A109E have been acquired.

==== In service ====
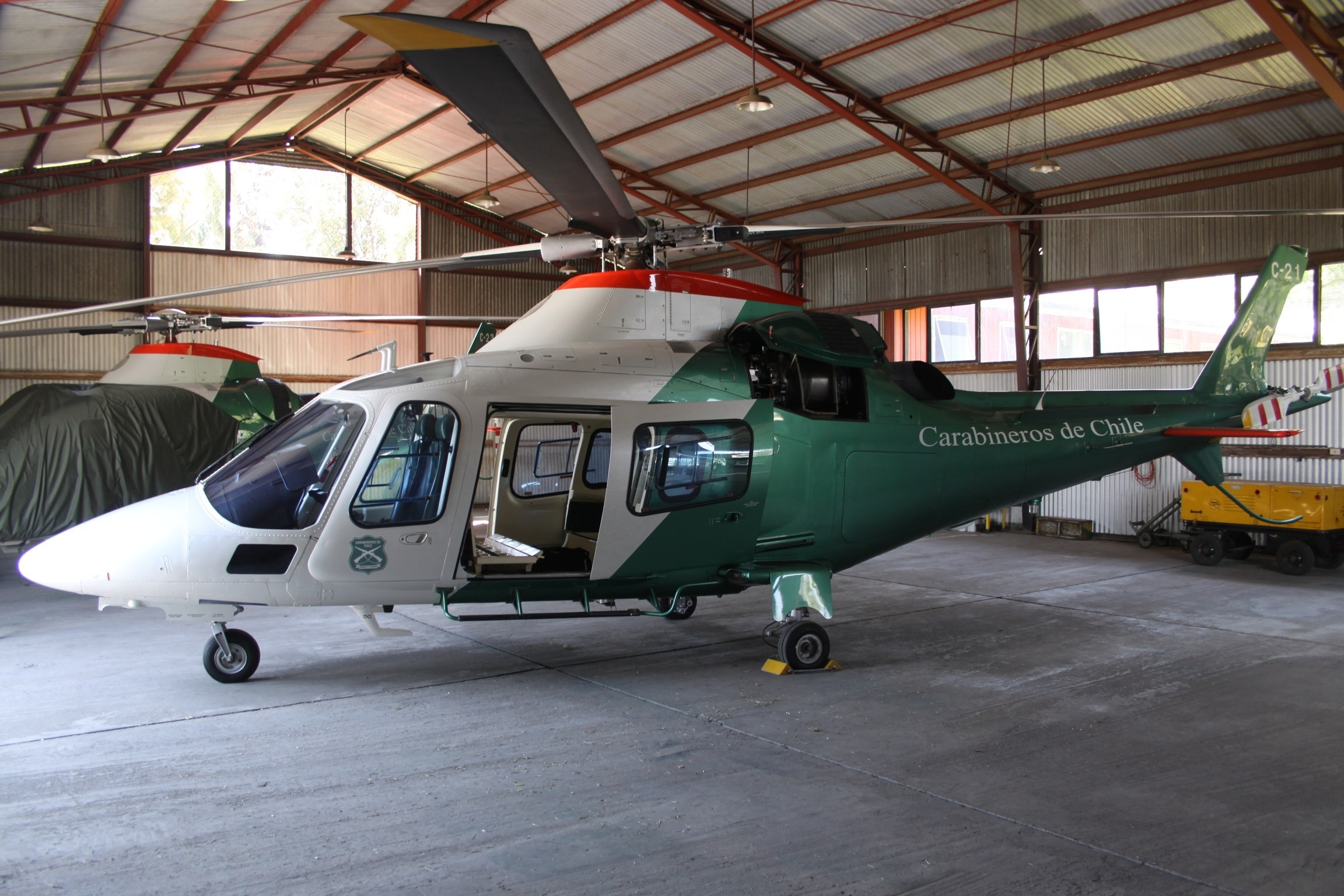
C-21 Agusta A109 Chilean Police

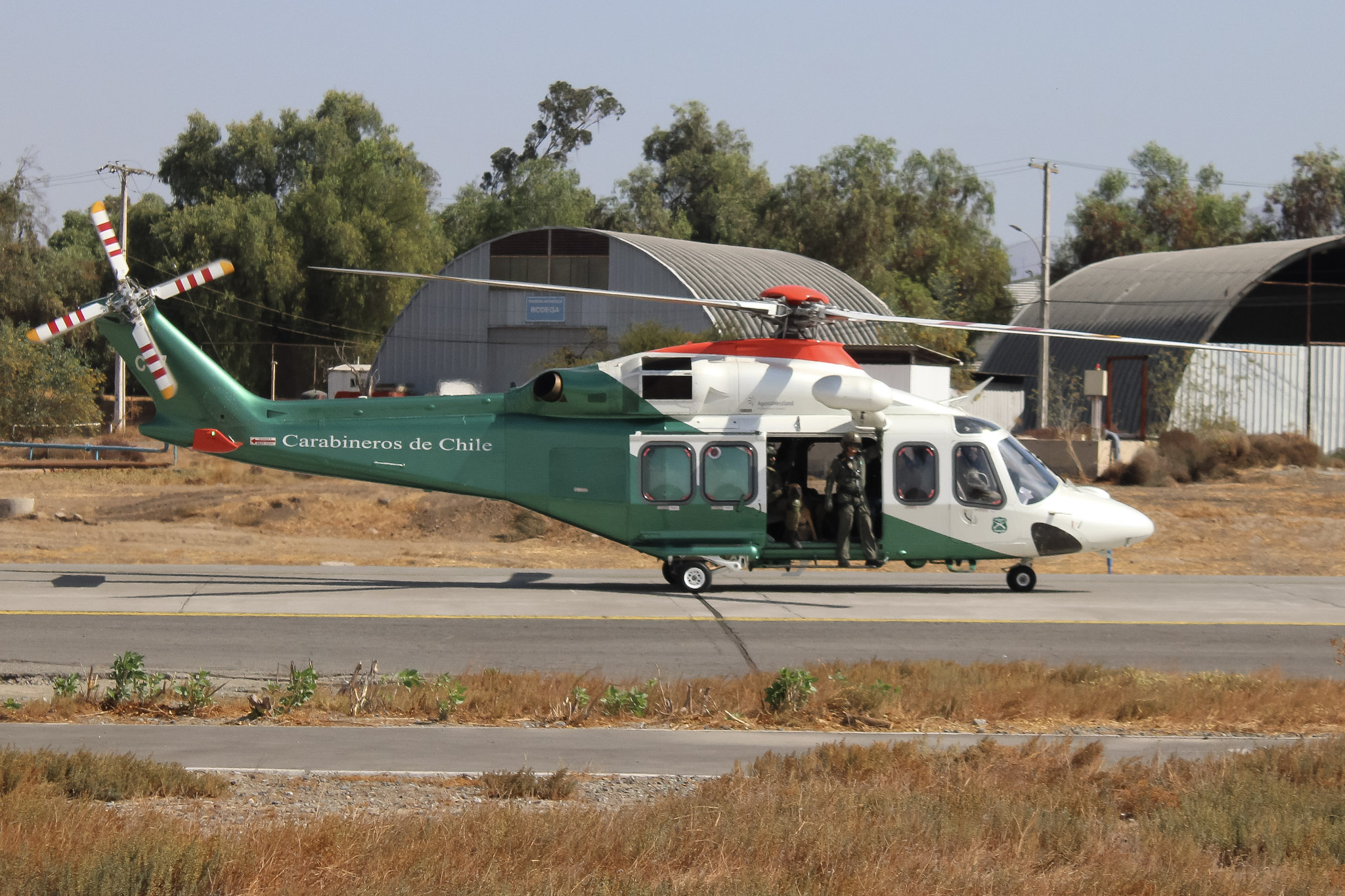
Agusta Westland AW139 (registration C-27) of the Carabineros de Chile.

Aircraft	Origin	Type	Versions	In service
Agusta A109	Italy	Utility transport	Agusta A109E	5
AgustaWestland AW139	Italy	Utility transport	Agusta AW139	1
Bell 206	United States	Utility helicopter	206B	2
Cessna 182	United States	Utility helicopter	182Q	5
Cessna 206	United States	Utility helicopter		3
Cessna 208	United States	Utility helicopter		1
Cessna 210	United States	Utility helicopter		5
Cessna Citation	United States	VIP transport	550 Citation II	2
Eurocopter Bo 105	Germany	Utility helicopter	Bo 105C; Bo 105LSA-3	3; 2
Eurocopter EC 135	Germany	Utility helicopter	EC 135 T1	2
MBB/Kawasaki BK 117	Germany; Japan	Utility helicopter	BK117B-1	3
Piper PA-31 Navajo	United States	Utility transport	PA-31; PA-31T Cheyenne	

== Vehicles ==
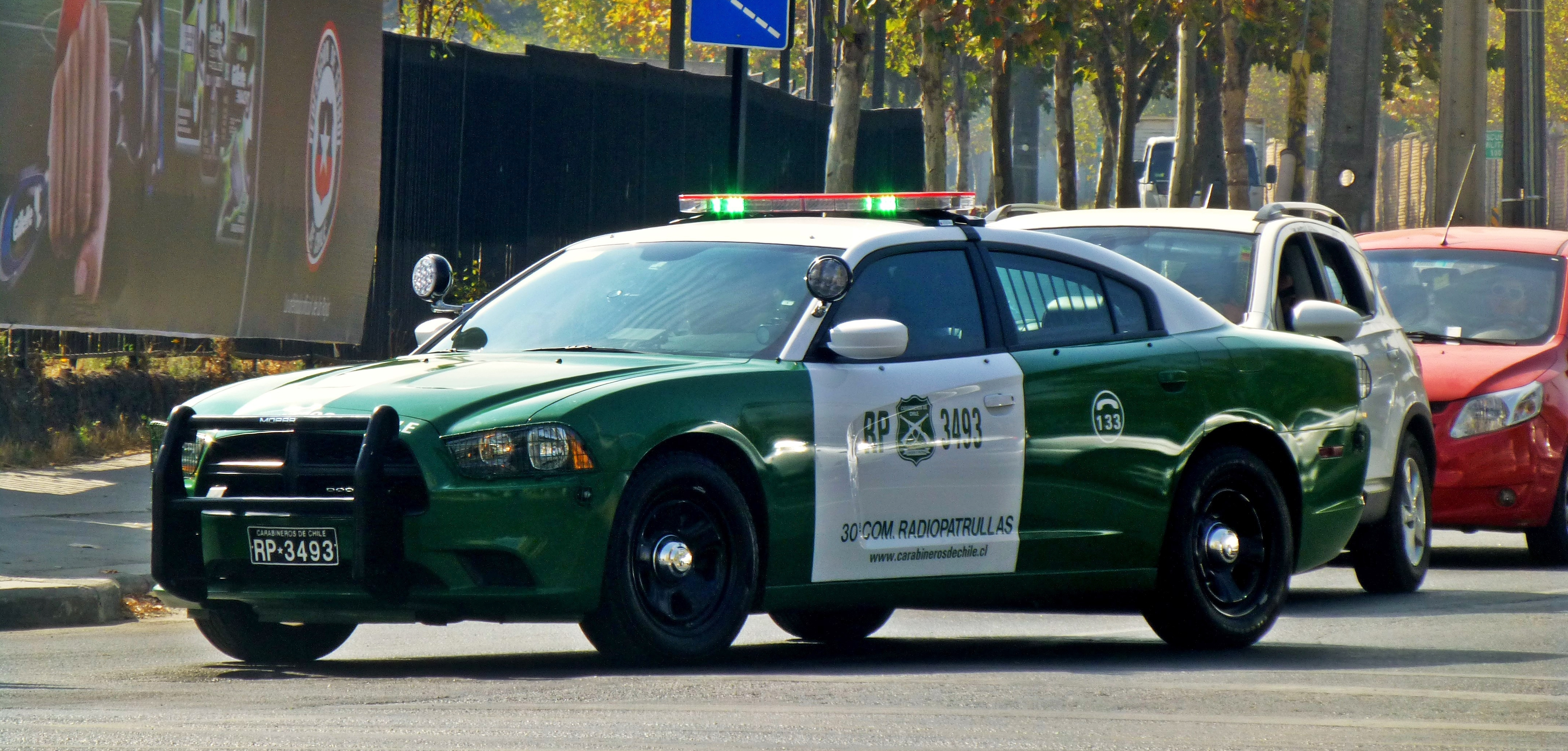
Dodge Charger 2014 of the Chilean Police

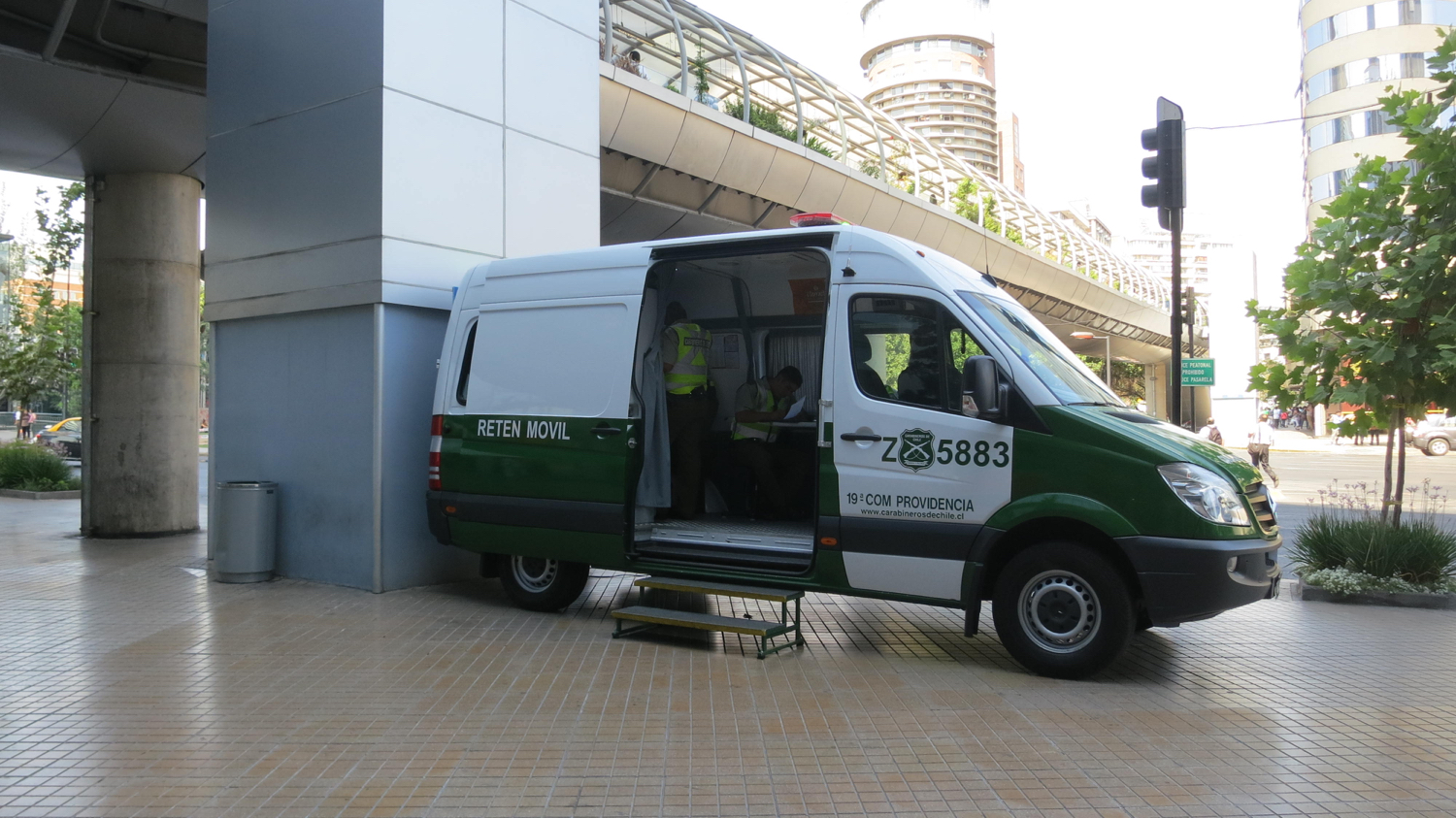
Carabineros work out of a Sprinter Mobile Command Station in Santiago

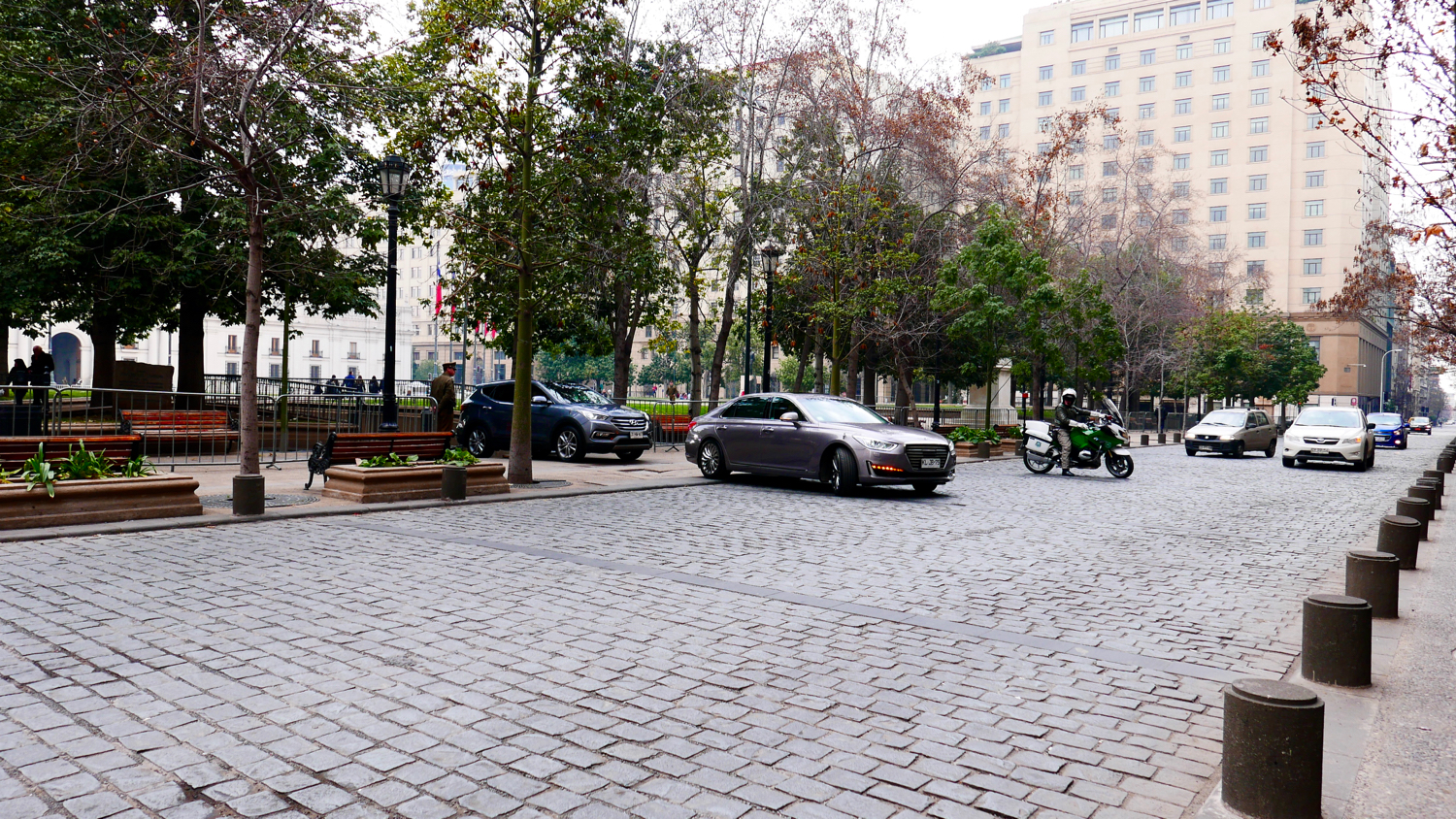
Carabineros escort a VIP leaving La Moneda Palace

=== Patrol cars ===
Vehicle Make and Model	Country of origin	Primary Function
Dodge Charger Pursuit 2006 - 2014 - 2016-19	United States	City/HW Patrol and Traffic Enforcement
Dodge Durango Pursuit 2016-18	United States	City/HW Patrol and Traffic Enforcement
Ford Ranger	United States	Rural Patrol and Traffic Enforcement
Dodge Ram 1500	United States	Rural Patrol and Traffic Enforcement
Nissan Terrano 4x4 Pickup 2009-13	Japan	Rural Patrol, Traffic Enforcement, Mobile Command and Emergency Services
Nissan Navara 2023	Japan	Rural Patrol, Traffic Enforcement, Mobile Command and Emergency Services
Chevrolet Optra 2009	United States	Traffic Enforcement
Chevrolet Cruze LS 2009	United States	Traffic Enforcement
Hyundai Elantra 2009	Republic of Korea	Traffic Enforcement
Chevrolet Express	United States	Mobile Command
Mercedes Benz Sprinter	Germany	City Patrol and Mobile Command
Fiat Cronos	Italy	City Patrol and Traffic Enforcement
Nissan Sentra	Japan	City Patrol and Traffic Enforcement
Toyota Corolla	Japan	City Patrol and Traffic Enforcement
Nissan X-Trail 2019	Japan	City/HW Patrol and Traffic Enforcement
Toyota Corolla Cross 2021	Japan	City/HW Patrol and Traffic Enforcement
Hyundai Santa Fe 2021	Republic of Korea	City/HW Patrol and Traffic Enforcement

=== Motorcycles ===
Vehicle	Origin	Function
BMW R-1200 RT	Germany	Highway Patrol and Traffic enforcement
BMW F-700 GS	Germany	Highway Patrol and Traffic enforcement
Honda XR250 Tornado	Japan	Highway Patrol and Traffic enforcement

=== Special operations (Grupo de Operaciones Policiales Especiales) ===
Vehicle	Origin	Function
Hunter TR-12	Colombia	Infantry mobility vehicle
Sherpa Light	France	Armored vehicle
Mahindra Marksman	India	Light Armored vehicle
Chevrolet Tahoe	United States	Transport Unit / First response
Chevrolet Suburban	United States	Transport Unit / First response
Hyundai H1	South Korea	Transport Unit / First response

=== Chile Border Patrol ===
Vehicle	Origin	Function
Toyota Tundra	United States	Border Patrol
Ram Pickup 3500	United States	North Chilean Desert Border Patrol
Ram Pickup 1500	United States	Border Patrol
Dodge Durango 4x4	United States	Border Patrol
Can-Am Commander	Canada	North Chilean Desert Border Patrol
Mercedes-Benz Zetros	Germany	North Chilean Desert Border Patrol

== Ranks of the Chilean Carabineros ==
=== Enlisted personnel and non-commissioned officers ===
Chilean and foreign NCOs enter the service through enrollment at the Carabineros Formation School and receive further training as corporals at the Carabineros NCO Academy, both located in the Santiago Metropolitan Region, and some of them have later training at the various service schools of the Carabineros specializing in frontier defense, horsemanship and K-9 training and handling skills.

- Carabinero alumno (Student Carabinier)
- Carabinero (Carabinier)
- Cabo Segundo (Second Corporal)
- Cabo Primero (First Corporal)
- Sargento Segundo (Sergeant)
- Sargento Primero (First Sergeant)
- Suboficial (Sub-officer)
- Suboficial Mayor (Subofficer Major)

Ranks	Warrant Officers	NCOs		Enlisted
Shirt; Cape; Carabinero shirt
Raincoat; Parka
Smock
Operational shirt
Ranks	Suboficial Mayor	Suboficial	Sargento 1º	Sargento 2°	Cabo 1º	Cabo 2°	Carabinero	Carabinero alumno
Abbreviation	(SOM)	(SuboF)	(SG1)	(SG2)	(CBO1)	(CBO2)	(Carab)

=== Commissioned officers ===
Officers of the Carabiners, native born or foreign officers having scholarships, start out as officer aspirants at the Carabinier Officers School "Pres. Gen. Carlos Ibanez del Campo" in Santiago, and after graduating become sublieutenants either in Chile or in their home countries. Later training is provided by the Police Sciences Academy also in Santiago, and in the aforementioned specialty schools of the force.

Ranks	General officers			Senior officers	Head officers		Junior officers
Uniform coat General officers' cape
Shirt; Raincoat; Parka
Cape
Smock
Operational shirt
Ranks	General Director	General Inspector	General	Coronel	Teniente Coronel	Mayor	Capitán	Teniente	Subteniente	Aspirante a oficial
Abbreviation	GNRL DIR	GNRL INS	GNRL	CRNL	TTE CRNL	MAY	CAP	TTE	SUB TTE

== See also ==
- La Moneda Palace Guard
- Chilean Army
- Chilean Navy
- Chilean Air Force
- Investigations Police of Chile
- Chilean Gendarmerie
- Crime in Chile
