= Virtual Police Station =

Virtual Police Station of Carabineros de Chile
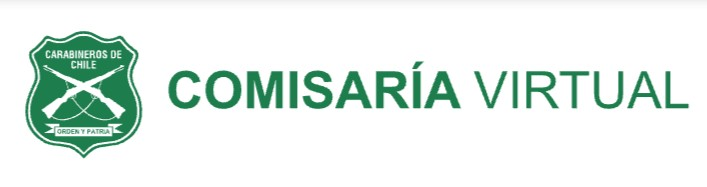
- Official logo
- Native name: Comisaría Virtual
- Company type: Government agency
- Website type: Online government portal
- Available in: 1 languages
- List of languages Spanish
- Founded: 11 June 2019
- Headquarters: {{{location_country}}}
- Country of origin: Chile
- Area served: National
- Owner: Carabineros de Chile
- Key people: Lieutenant Colonel Jorge Cárcamo Oyarzún (Chief)
- Industry: Law enforcement / Public service
- Services: Online reporting, safe-conduct permits, certificates, anonymous information, family reunification
- Parent: Ministry of the Interior and Public Security (Chile)
- Website: www.comisariavirtual.cl
- Commercial: No
- Launched: 11 June 2019
- Current status: Active

The Virtual Police Station (Spanish Comisaría Virtual) is a digital citizen service platform launched in 2019 by the Chilean Carabineros (national police force). It aims to provide a range of police services through an online interface, facilitating easier and more efficient access for the public. The platform aligns with Chile's broader public policies promoting a paperless administration and digital government initiatives, which seek to modernize state institutions and enhance operational efficiency. It also enables individuals who may feel hesitant or fearful to report illegal activities in person to do so securely and conveniently through a centralized platform with nationwide coverage, available 24 hours a day. All services are offered free of charge as a public service, supporting community welfare and citizen security.

== History ==
=== Launching ===
The website was launched as part of the "Safe Street Plan" program, developed by the Ministry of the Interior during Sebastián Piñera’s second administration, aimed at strengthening security measures to reduce crime levels on Chilean streets.

=== COVID-19 pandemic ===
During the COVID-19 pandemic, Chilean health authorities implemented strict restrictions on free movement and quarantines to control the spread of the virus. To facilitate compliance with these measures while allowing essential activities, the government introduced into the Comisaría Virtual system, an online service for issuing electronic safe-conduct permits (permiso de desplazamiento). This digital system enabled citizens to request and obtain authorization to leave their homes during quarantine periods without the need for physical paperwork or in-person visits to police stations.

The Comisaría Virtual featured a centralized database and integrated security measures that effectively prevented counterfeiting and fraud, ensuring that only valid and authorized permits were recognized by law enforcement. This secure design enhanced public trust and enforcement efficiency.

The system was recognized worldwide as an exemplary model of digital public service for its rapid deployment, accessibility, and effectiveness during a health crisis. By replacing traditional paper permits with electronic authorizations, it also contributed to reducing paper consumption and minimizing physical contact, supporting both environmental sustainability and public health objectives.

== Technical challenges and adaptations ==
During the COVID-19 pandemic in Chile, the digital platform Comisaría Virtual of Carabineros became the most visited website in the country, serving as the primary portal for obtaining safe-conduct permits (salvoconductos) and other essential online services. However, the surge in traffic exposed several technical limitations affecting its performance.

=== Technical problems ===
In May 2020, the platform experienced multiple outages due to technical failures, preventing users from accessing the permits needed to travel during quarantine periods. Carabineros reported via social media that the website was down and that support personnel were working to restore service.

Additionally, the Office of the Comptroller General of the Republic detected irregularities in the system, such as the issuance of over 2,000 permits to individuals with positive COVID-19 diagnoses between March and May 2020. This was due to a lack of interoperability with databases from the Ministry of Health, the National Civil Registry, and Gendarmería, allowing personal data to be validated without mobility restrictions.

=== Adaptations and innovations ===
To address these challenges, several technical improvements were implemented. The platform was scaled using cloud computing technologies, deploying multiple EC2 virtual machines in parallel to handle the growing demand. At its peak, the system ran on 300 virtual machines hosting over 3,000 containers with Comisaría Virtual operating simultaneously, ensuring sufficient capacity and system stability.

These measures improved the platform’s reliability and availability, allowing citizens to complete online procedures efficiently during the restrictions imposed by the pandemic.

== Current services ==
The website provides a range of services offered by the Chilean uniformed police, organized into six categories: reporting (complaints), issuing safe-conduct permits, submitting anonymous complaints, registering records of events, filing complaints or commendations, and facilitating family reunions for individuals who have lost contact with immediate relatives for personal or emotional reasons, distinct from missing person cases. Except for submitting anonymous information, users must first register on the website through one of two methods: an internal registration managed by the Carabineros de Chile police force or via the ClaveÚnica, Chile’s unified digital authentication system that allows access to all government online services across state institutions and agencies.

=== Complaints ===
Through this virtual platform, citizens can file written complaints regarding various legal infractions. The platform covers the following types of offenses:

- Simple theft
- Theft of vehicle accessories
- Surprise robbery
- Fraud
- Theft of found property
- Aggravated theft
- Damage to private property
- Animal cruelty
- Embezzlement

=== Anonymous information ===
The Comisaría Virtual platform allows users to anonymously report information to Carabineros without requiring personal identification or authentication. This feature is designed to encourage community participation in public safety by protecting the identity of informants. Anonymous reports can be submitted regarding:

- Organized crime: Users can provide tips or intelligence on criminal groups or activities affecting public order.
- Vehicle-related crimes: Information about stolen vehicles, illegal modifications, or other motor vehicle offenses can be reported.
- Drug-related offenses: Citizens can anonymously report on drug trafficking, sales, or related illegal activities.

This anonymous reporting mechanism aims to enhance law enforcement’s ability to investigate and prevent crime while ensuring user privacy and security.

=== Certificates ===
The Comisaría Virtual allows citizens to formally register specific incidents with Carabineros, which serve as official records for various legal and administrative purposes:

- Certificates for injured firefighters: These documents certify injuries sustained by firefighters during duty and are required for presenting claims before the Financial Market Commission (Comisión para el Mercado Financiero), supporting access to compensation or benefits.
- Labor-related certificates: Employers or employees can document breaches of employment contracts or labor agreements, providing official proof for disputes or legal claims under Chilean labor law.
- Reports of abandonment of the home: This allows individuals to formally notify authorities about a family member’s voluntary departure from the household, which can have implications in family and civil law.
- Records of unpaid child support: Citizens can leave official evidence regarding failure to pay legally mandated child support (pensión de alimentos), facilitating judicial or administrative follow-up.
- Loss of official documents: This includes reports of lost identity cards (cédula de identidad), passports, or other essential documents, a necessary step for requesting replacements and preventing identity fraud.
- Loss of mobile phones: Reporting lost mobile devices helps in theft investigations and may be required for insurance claims or blocking services.
- Loss or duplicate requests for vehicle license plates: Citizens can report lost license plates or apply for duplicates, in accordance with vehicle registration regulations.
- Violations of visitation rights: Parents or guardians can document non-compliance with court-ordered visitation schedules, supporting legal enforcement of family rights.
- Loss of permanent residence certificates: Foreign residents legally residing in Chile can report lost certificates of permanent residency, which are essential for maintaining legal status and accessing public services.

=== Family reunification ===
Citizens may voluntarily request assistance in re-establishing contact with relatives with whom communication has been lost for personal or emotional reasons (not to be confused with missing persons cases). Carabineros officials then initiate an administrative search for humanitarian and support purposes.

== Other services ==
- The platform has also functioned as a virtual condolence book, enabling citizens to express messages of sympathy and remembrance for Carabineros personnel killed in the line of duty.
- The platform also provides an electronic system for submitting excuses for voters located more than 200 km (approximately 124 miles) from their polling station, offering a faster alternative to manual registration at police stations, which can result in long queues. As a result, an electronic document is sent to the voter via email, which must be presented in person at any police station so that the voter’s identity can be verified and a police officer can act as an official witness. This exempts voters from being sanctioned by a Chilean court in cases of compulsory voting.
