= Suicide by cop =

Intentional provocation of a lethal response from law enforcement

Suicide by cop, also known as suicide by police or law-enforcement-assisted suicide, is used to define a death, intended as suicide, for which a person attempts to provoke police. The phenomenon, as described in some sources, involves an allegedly suicidal person deliberately behaving in a threatening manner with intent to provoke law enforcement to kill them. The concept arose in the United States. The terminology has now spread to other places such as Canada and Australia.

== Overview ==
There are two broad categories of "suicide by cop". The first is when someone has committed a crime and is being pursued by the police and decides that they would rather die than be arrested. These people may not otherwise be suicidal but may simply decide that life is not worth living if they are incarcerated and thus will provoke police to kill them. The second version involves people who are already contemplating suicide and who decide to provoke law enforcement into killing them. These individuals may commit a crime with the specific intention of provoking a law enforcement response.

This designation hinges on the person's state of mind, and their desire to end their own life, which can be difficult to determine post-mortem.

== History ==
Many modern cases that pre-date the formal recognition of the phenomenon have been identified or speculated by historians as matching the pattern now known as suicide by cop. According to authors Mark Lindsay and David Lester, Houston McCoy, one of the two Austin Police Department officers who shot and killed Charles Whitman, the "Texas Tower Sniper", believed that Whitman could have shot him and fellow officer Ramiro Martinez, but "he was waiting for them, and wanted to be shot." The 1976 death of Mal Evans, road manager, assistant, and a friend of the Beatles, who aimed an air gun at police and refused to put it down, was theorized as a possible example of this phenomenon. Some historians believe that Giuseppe Zangara, the man who killed Chicago mayor Anton Cermak in a possible attempt to assassinate then President-elect Franklin D. Roosevelt, might have been attempting suicide by police.

== Recognition and research ==
The phenomenon has been described in news accounts from 1981, and scientific journals since 1985. The phrase has appeared in news headlines since at least 1987. It did not become common until the early 2000s. The phrase seems to have originated in the United States, but has also appeared in the UK, where a jury first determined someone died by suicide by cop in 2003.

Some of the first research into suicide by cop was completed by Sgt. Rick Parent of the Delta Police Department in 2004. Parent's research of 843 police shootings determined that about 50% were victim-precipitated homicide. Police defined victim-precipitated homicide as "an incident in which an individual bent on self-destruction, engages in life threatening and criminal behavior to force law enforcement officers to kill them."

The first formally labeled "Suicide by Cop" case in English legal history was a judgment made on May 9, 2003, by the Reverend Dr. William Dolman while serving as a London coroner between 1993 and 2007. It set a legal precedent and the judgment, as a cause of death, has been a part of English law since.

A 2009 study in the United States of the profiles of 268 people who died by suicide by cop found that:

- 95% were male and 5% were female
- the mean age was 35 for men
- 41% of men were Caucasian, 26% Hispanic and 16% African American
- 37% of men were single
- 29% of men had children
- 54% of men were unemployed
- 29% of men did not have housing
- 62% of men had confirmed or probable histories of mental health issues
- 80% of men were armed – of these, 60% possessed firearms (of which 86% were loaded) and 26% possessed knives
- 19% feigned or simulated weapon possession
- 87% of individuals made suicidal communications prior to or during the incident
- 36% were under the influence of alcohol.

A study of five years (2010–2015) of LAPD data on 419 attempted suicides by cop found that officers used lethal force seven times, killing five of the subjects. Less-lethal force was used 71 times. No force was used the other 341 times, or 81 percent. LAPD's Mental Evaluation Unit has specially trained officers, paired with mental health clinicians, to handle such incidents who are on call 24 hours a day.

In the US, the Police Executive Research Forum developed a protocol for dealing with incidents, in which officers do not aim their weapon at the person, move a safe distance away and engage the person in conversation rather than shouting commands at them. Such deescalation tactics were deployed when blogger Perez Hilton self-harmed on-line in early August 2026.

== Examples ==
- According to the Beatles researcher Kenneth Womack, the death of the band's roadie Mal Evans in 1976 was a suicide by cop, as Evans had written a will the night before.
- In the Aramoana massacre, a spree shooting that occurred on 13 November 1990 in New Zealand, police shot the suspect dead as he came out of a house firing from the hip and screaming "Kill me!"
- On 5 May 2005, Peggy Jo Tallas, a bank robber, engaged in a shootout while armed with a toy pistol.
- In December 2008, 15-year-old Tyler Cassidy was shot and killed by three Victoria Police officers after he threatened them with two large knives and ordered them to shoot him.
- During March 2011, Chilean businessman and organized criminal Italo Nolli was shot and killed by police after shooting dead two investigative police detectives and hurting another five. He had previously stated to his wife and son that he believed dying in a police shootout would be "dignifying" and that he "would not return to prison".
- Myron May, a 31-year-old man believing he was a victim of government covert electronic harassment on the line of Cold War era MKUltra and COINTELPRO clandestine US government programs, died by suicide by cop on 20 November 2014 after recording his intentions on tape.
- On 4 January 2015, a 32-year-old San Francisco man, Matthew Hoffman, staged a standoff with police in the parking lot of an SFPD station. When he brandished the gun, two officers shot him a total of three times. He left a message for the officers on his cell phone, saying: "You did nothing wrong. You ended the life of a man who was too much of a coward to do it himself ... I provoked you. I threatened your life as well as the lives of those around me."
- In June 2015, 21-year-old Trepierre Hummons, a known gangster with a history of weapons violations, posted his intent to die by suicide by cop on Facebook on the same day he was accused of a sexual offense. He called 9-1-1 and reported he had seen a man acting erratically with a gun. He then shot the responding officer multiple times, mortally wounding him. The next officer to arrive on the scene shot Hummons. Both Hummons and the wounded policeman later died in the hospital.
- On 22 October 2015, Anton Lundin Pettersson, the perpetrator of the Trollhättan school stabbing, wrote a message to an online friend an hour before the attack, where he states “I hope those fucking cops aim straight, because I really don't want to survive my rampage." He also wrote that he expected to be dead within one or two hours and that he hated himself. Pettersson had a history of mental illness, and a book about the attack with interviews of many people around him states that "during the period before the attack, he wavered between several options; to seek professional help, to kill himself 'normally' or to attack people around him to get killed."
- On 25 June 2016, Dylan Mark Noble, a 19-year-old unarmed white man with mental health problems, was fatally shot by Fresno police. Noble fled from a traffic stop but refused to listen to commands. He reached for his waistband continuously, resulting in two officers fatally shooting him. Noble can be heard on the bodycam footage saying, "I fucking hate my life, fuck it!" The shooting sparked massive outrage and protests across Fresno and the surrounding area, including White Lives Matter banners being flown by support.
- On 28 May 2017, a man named Willie Godbolt in Mississippi who murdered seven of his family members and a police officer told a journalist that by shooting towards police, "Suicide by cop was my intention. I ain't fit to live. Not after what I've done."
- On 15 September 2017, a 15-year-old Virginia boy, Ruben Urbina, called police and was shot twice after threatening an officer with a crowbar. After calling 911, he made threats of a bomb, hostages, knives and guns, none of which were real. "I called the police… so they can kill me."
- On August 30, 2018, American actress Vanessa Marquez pleaded with police officers to kill her while pointing a replica gun at them. Officers were unaware the gun was a replica, and they shot her to death in self-defense.
- In 2018, Alek Minassian, the perpetrator of the Toronto van attack, claimed to have attempted suicide by cop when apprehended by police after his attack, requesting to be killed and claiming he was armed with a gun, a declaration which was false.
- In July 2021, a 16-year-old boy in Singapore killed a 13-year-old schoolmate with an axe in the River Valley High School attack. Media reported from the killer's trial that he had planned to kill others in school so that the police would kill him.
- On May 15, 2023, the perpetrator of the 2023 Farmington, New Mexico shooting, Beau Wilson, shouted "come kill me" repeatedly while shooting at bystanders and police with a handgun. Farmington Police Chief Steve Hebbe said he believed Wilson "made the decision that he is going to stand and fight it out until he is killed." Wilson was shot and killed by police during the incident.

== In popular culture ==
In To Kill a Mockingbird, Tom Robinson, a despondent Black man who is on death row for a rape he did not commit, is shot 17 times and killed while trying to escape from the prison in front of the prison guards.

In The Outsiders, Dallas Winston, a juvenile delinquent, aims an unloaded handgun at police officers with the intent of them shooting him; he is shot dead.

In Falling Down, William Foster, a man who goes on a spree of crime out of anger towards society, draws a water gun when confronted by a cop, and is subsequently shot due to the cop believing him to be drawing a real gun.

== See also ==
- Banzai charge
- Circumcellions
- Consensual homicide
- Lists of killings by law enforcement officers
- Police brutality
- Running amok
- Samaritans (charity)
- Suicide attack
- Suicide crisis
- Suicide intervention
- Suicide prevention
