= La Moneda Palace Guard =

Palace Guard
- Guardia de Palacio
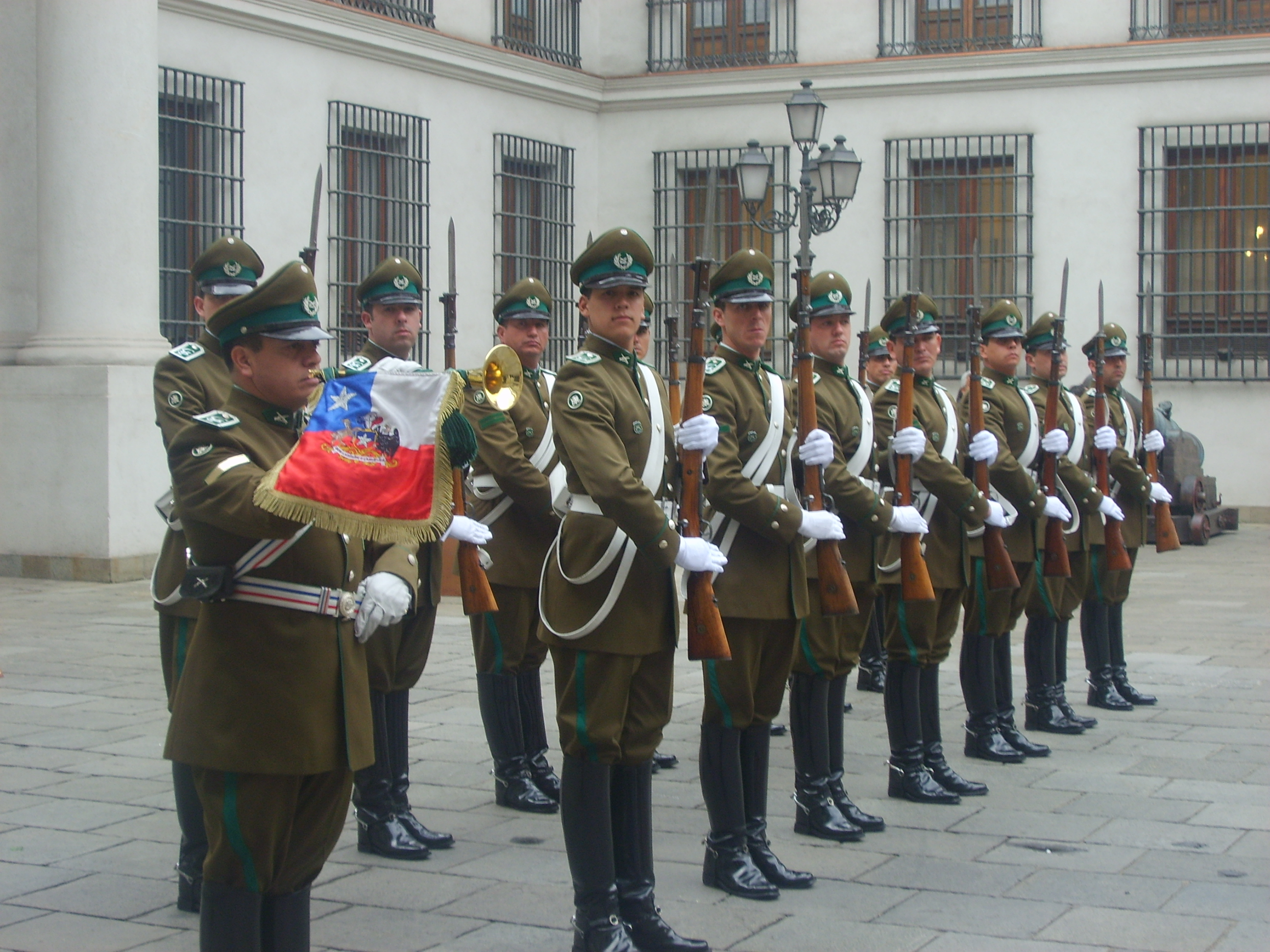
- Palace Guard in 2007
- Active: 1932–present
- Allegiance: Chile
- Branch: Carabineros de Chile
- Type: presidential guard
- Role: public duties, physical security
- Garrison/HQ: Santiago

La Moneda Palace Guard (Spanish: Guardia de Palacio de la Moneda) is the ceremonial escort to the president of Chile and also assists with physical security at La Moneda Palace. It is an operational component of the Carabineros de Chile.

== History ==
The earliest recorded instance of a force of guards for the executive residence was during the government of Manuel Bulnes in 1851. The Carabineros became responsible for defense of La Moneda in 1932 and the guard contingent at the palace assumed its current name, the Palace Guard, in 1996.

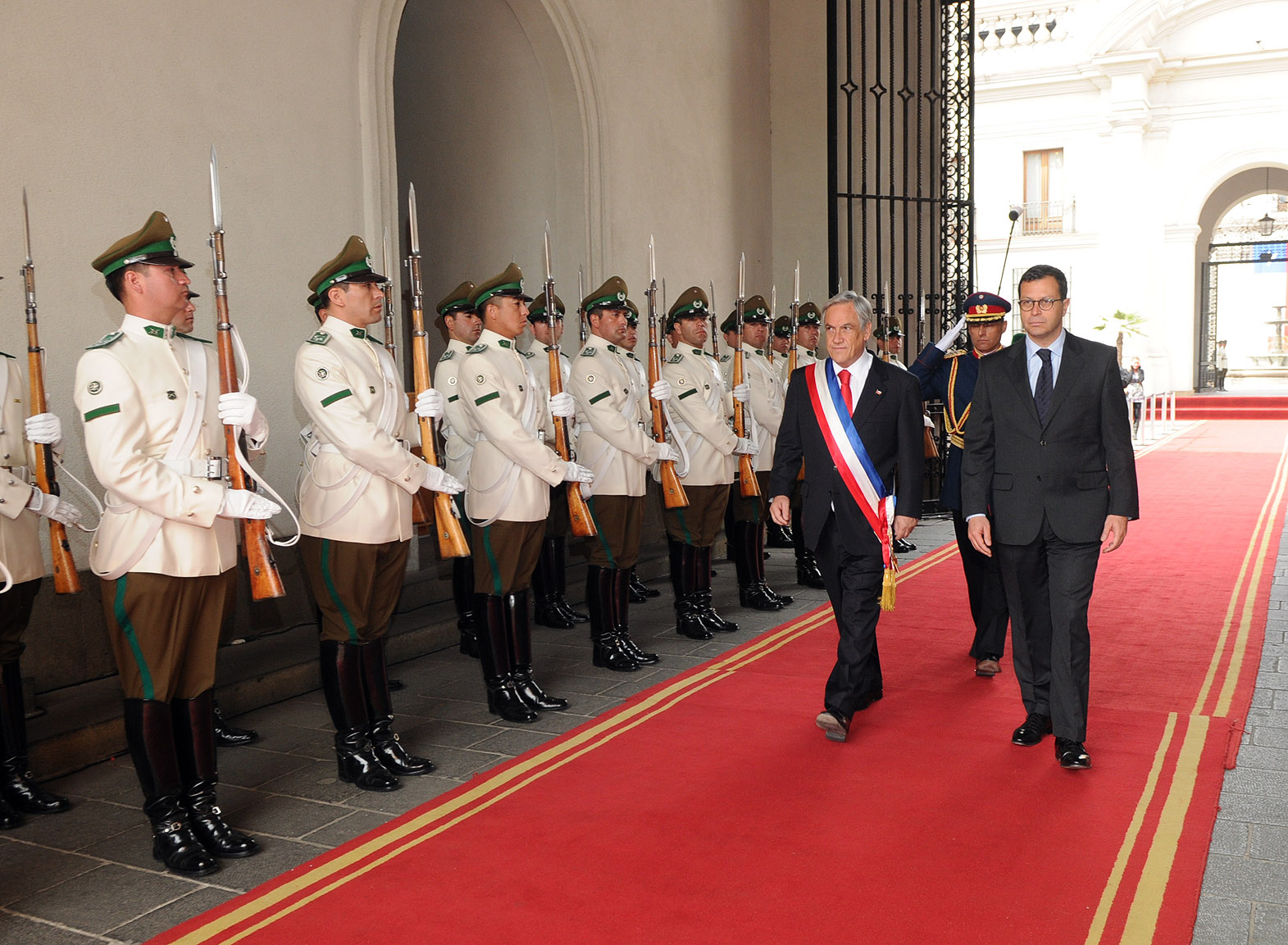
A cordon of the Palace Guard in summer white uniform in 2010

In addition to public duties, the Palace Guard also has practical security responsibilities for the defense of La Moneda. In 2016 Carabineros assigned to the Palace Guard physically detained a group of student protesters who stormed the courtyard of the palace before its gates could be sealed. During the 1973 Chilean coup d'état, a 300-man force of the then-named Presidential Guard, and other carabineros, fortified the perimeter of La Moneda against the Chilean Army. They remained at their posts until 9:00 a.m. the day of the putsch, withdrawing after being informed that Gen. César Mendoza had thrown his support to the newly declared junta.

Female carabineros joined the Palace Guard for the first time in December 2001.

The Guard Group, since 2012, also has a full horse guards troop, carrying lances in state ceremonies.

The Guard Group reports to the Directorate of Special Services and Border Security of the Carabineros, and a specialized company is assigned to secure the Palace of Cerro Castillo in Viña del Mar.

== Drill and ceremony ==
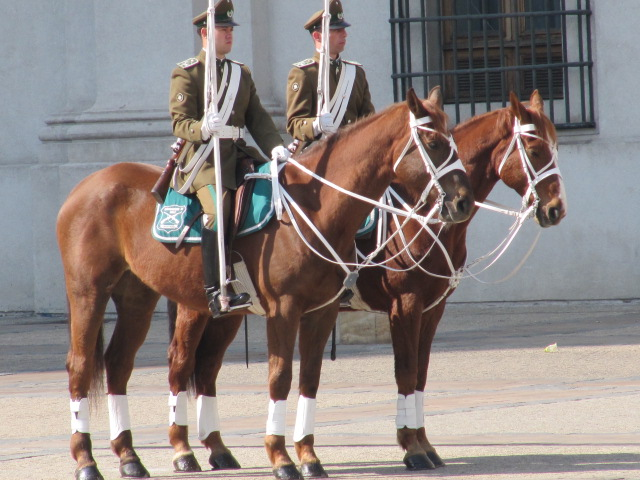
Mounted Guards

A changing of the guard ceremony occurs every 48 hours at 10:00 a.m. During it, two Carabineros mounted units and the Central Band of the Carabineros escort the incoming guard detachment to La Moneda, and the outgoing detachment from it. The current drill for the changing of the guard was instituted in 1936. Both the old and new guard detachments have an infantry company and a cavalry platoon, with two buglers, while the old guard detachment has a drummer attached.

Each Monday since its inception the guard has provided two, ten-man squads, a drummer and a bugler to form a cordon of honor for the entrance of the president of Chile into La Moneda at the start of the work week. If the president is outside the capital, the drill is performed instead for the vice president. The guard of honor platoon is made up of infantrymen from the guard's infantry component.
