= Investigations Police of Chile =

Civilian police of Chile

Investigations Police of Chile Policía de Investigaciones de Chile
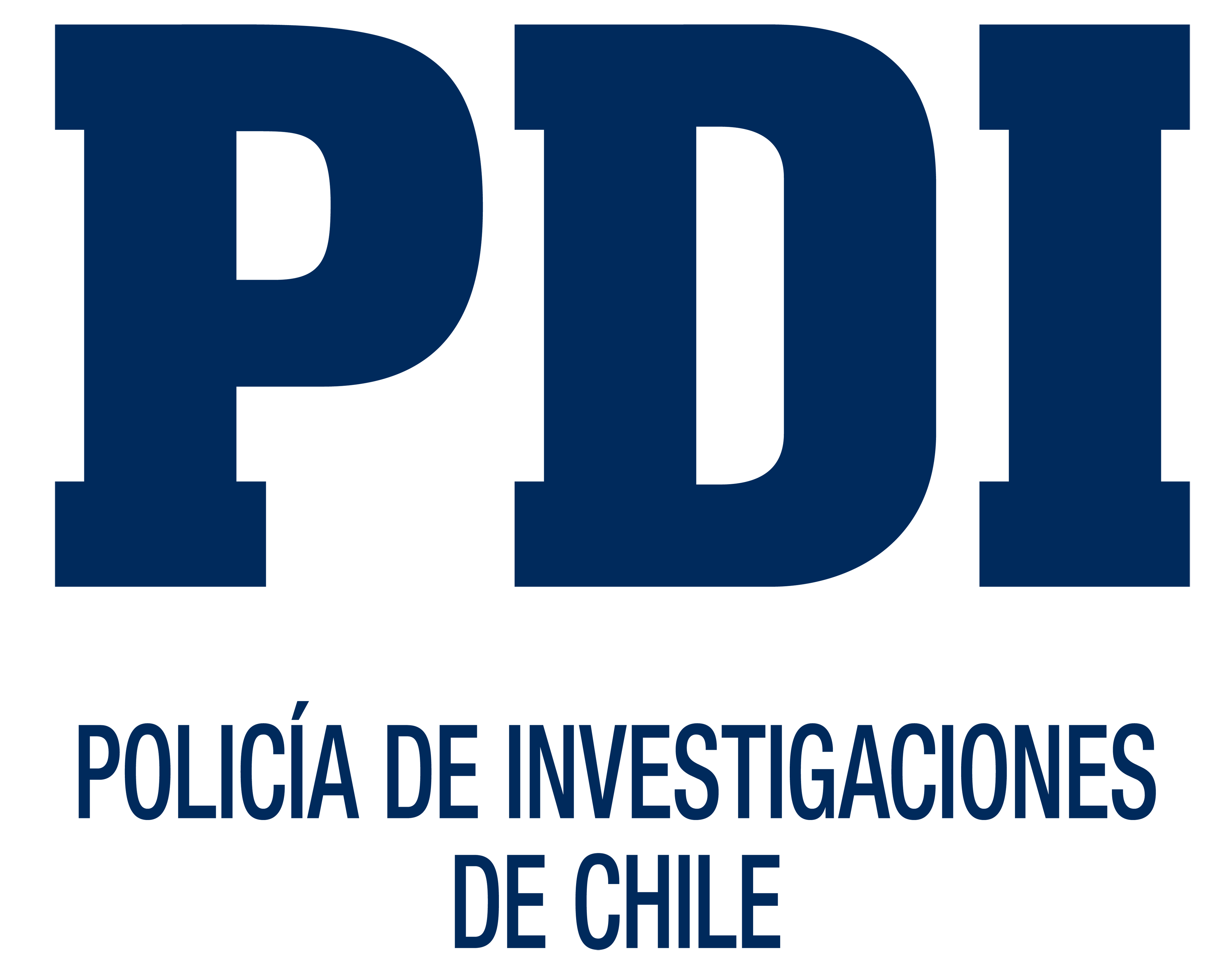
- Logo

- Flag
- Abbreviation: PDI
- Motto: Honor, Disciplina y Lealtad; Honour, Discipline and Loyalty

Agency overview
- Formed: June 19, 1933

Jurisdictional structure
- National agency (Operations jurisdiction): Chile
- Operations jurisdiction: Chile
- Population: 18,191,884
- Legal jurisdiction: As per operations jurisdiction
- General nature: Civilian police

Operational structure
- Overseen by: Dirección General
- Headquarters: Santiago de Chile
- Sworn members: 5,478 (2010)
- Agency executive: Eduardo Cerna Lozano, Director General

Facilities
- Stations: 128

Website
- policia.cl (in Spanish)

Investigations Police of Chile (Spanish: Policía de Investigaciones de Chile, PDI) are the civilian investigative police force of Chile. Founded in 1933, it is one of two Chilean police bodies, along with the Carabineros de Chile. The PDI is the principal law enforcement arm of the Public Prosecutor's Office of Chile in criminal investigation.

== History ==
=== 19th century ===
The first reference to police work in Chile is in the Police Regulation of 1803, where the terms "high police" and "public security" are used. Then, in 1830, the Vigilantes and Serenos Corps of Santiago were created, whose work was followed throughout the country. In 1852 the Brigada de Policía was created in Santiago, where the Vigilantes and Serenos Corps were merged.

In the 1870s, the mayor of the city of Santiago, Benjamín Vicuña Mackenna proposed modelling the Brigada de Policía on the Agent de la Sûrete in Paris, France, which was based on the administrative structure of the police force. Ranks of Inspector, Comisario, and Prefecto (based on the French ranks of Inspecteur, Commissaire, and Préfet) were implemented, and that are still used today.

=== 20th century ===
The modern Investigations Police was established in 1933 as a separate organization of civil police, independent from the control of the militarized Carabineros de Chile.

In March 2011, fence and arms dealer Italo Nolli shot and killed PDI detectives Marcelo Morales and Kiram Gallardo, the latter of which thus became the first female PDI member killed in the line of duty.

== Organization ==
The Investigative Police divides its investigation areas according to the crime investigated, counting with it several specialized units of police investigation, which have Detectives specialists, experts and experts in the respective areas.

=== National Headquarters of Crimes Against Human Rights and People ===
(Jefatura Nacional de delitos contra los Derechos Humanos y las Personas, JENADEP)

- Homicide Brigade (Brigada de Homicidios, BH)
- Missing Persons Brigade (Brigada de Ubicación de Personas, BRIUP)
- Investigative Brigade of Crimes against Human Rights (Brigada Investigadora de Delitos contra los Derechos Humanos, BRIDEHU)
- Department of Forensic Medicine (Departamento de Medicina Criminalística, DEMECRI)

=== National Headquarters of Immigration and International Policing ===
(Jefatura Nacional de Extranjería y Policía Internacional, JENAEX)

- Department of Immigration and International Police (Departamento de Extranjería y Policía Internacional, POLINT)
- Department of Immigration and International Airport Police (Departamento de Extranjería y Policía Internacional Aeropuerto, POLINT AEROPUERTO)
- Department of Secondary Airport Inspection (Departamento de Inspección Secundaria Aeropuerto, DEINSA)
- Investigative Brigade of Human Trafficking (Brigada Investigadora de Trata de Personas, BRITRAP)

=== National Headquarters against Robberies and Criminal Areas ===
(Jefatura Nacional contra Robos y Focos Criminales, JENACROF)

- Robbery Investigative Brigade (Brigada Investigadora de Robos, BIRO)
- Brigade of Criminal Investigation and Police Intervention (Brigada de Investigación Criminal e Intervención Policial, BICRIMPOL)

=== National Headquarters of Crimes against the family ===
(Jefatura Nacional de delitos contra la Familia, JENAFAM)

- Investigative Brigade of Sexual and Minor Crimes (Brigada Investigadora de Delitos Sexuales y Menores, BRISEXME)
- Institute of Criminology (Instituto de Criminología, INSCRIM)
- Community Support and Action Department (Departamento de Apoyo y Acción Comunitaria, DACOM)

=== National Headquarters of Police Intelligence ===
(Jefatura Nacional de Inteligencia Policial, JENAIPOL)

- Police Intelligence Brigade (Brigada de Inteligencia Policial, BIP)
- Special Police Investigations Brigade (Brigada de Investigaciones Policiales Especiales, BIPE)

=== National Headquarters of Economic and Environmental Crimes ===
(Jefatura Nacional de Delitos Económicos y Medioambiente, JENADEM)

- Investigative Brigade of Economic Crimes (Brigada Investigadora de Delitos Económicos, BRIDEC)
- Cybercrime Investigative Brigade (Brigada Investigadora del Cibercrimen, BRICIB)
- Investigative Brigade of Crimes against the Environment and Cultural Heritage (Brigada Investigadora de Delitos contra el Medioambiente y Patrimonio Cultural, BIDEMA)
- Investigative Brigade of Official Crimes (Brigada Investigadora de Delitos Funcionarios, BRIDEF)
- Investigative Brigade of Intellectual Property Crimes (Brigada Investigadora de Delitos de Propiedad Intelectual, BRIDEPI)
- Investigative Brigade of Crimes in Port Premises (Brigada Investigadora de Delitos en Recintos Portuarios, BRIDERPO)

=== National Headquarters of Counternarcotics and Anti-Organized Crime ===
(Jefatura Nacional Antinarcóticos y contra el Crimen Organizado, JENANCO)

- Anti-Narcotics Brigade (Brigada Antinarcóticos, BRIANT) in Santiago, and Anti-Narcotics and Anti-Organized Crime Brigades (Brigadas Antinarcóticos y contra el Crimen Organizado, BRIANCO) in Regions
- Investigative Brigade of Organized Crime (Brigada Investigadora del Crimen Organizado, BRICO)
- Investigating Brigade of Money Laundering (Brigada Investigadora de Lavado de Activos, BRILAC)
- Canine Training Brigade (Brigada de Adiestramiento Canino, BRIACAN)
- Air Policing Brigade (Brigada Aeropolicial, BAP)
- Metropolitan Tactical Reaction Brigade (Brigada de Reacción Táctica Metropolitana, BRTM), and Tactical Reaction Teams (Equipos de Reacción Táctica, ERTA) in Regions
  - Underwater Operations Team (Equipo de Operaciones Subacuaticas, EOS)
  - High Risk Vertical Work Team (Equipo de Trabajos Verticales de Alto Riesgo, ETVAR)

=== National Headquarters of Criminalistics ===
(Jefatura Nacional de Criminalística, JENACRIM)

- Criminalistics Laboratory (Laboratorio de Criminalística, LACRIM)
- Technical Advisory Department (Departamento de Asesoría Técnica, ASETEC)

=== Criminal Investigation Brigades and others ===
- Criminal Investigation Brigades (Brigadas de Investigación Criminal, BICRIM)
  - Zero Microtrace Equipment (Equipos Microtráfico Cero, MT0)
- National Center for Criminal Analysis (Centro Nacional de Análisis Criminal, CENACRIM)
  - Criminal Analysis Offices (Oficinas de Análisis Criminal, OFAN)
- Police Information Center (Central de Informaciones Policiales, CIPOL)
- Interpol National Central Office (Oficina Central Nacional Interpol, OCN INTERPOL)
- Department of Protection of Important Persons (Departamento de Protección de Personas Importantes, DPPI)
- National Congress Brigade (Brigada Congreso Nacional, BRICONA)
- Presidential Brigade La Moneda (Brigada Presidencial La Moneda, BRIPEMO)

== See also ==
- Carabineros de Chile
- Chilean Gendarmerie
- Crime in Chile
