= Italo Nolli =

Chilean arms dealer (1942–2011)

- Born: Italo Jorge Nolli Olivan; 27 May 1942; Santiago, Chile
- Died: 23 March 2011 (68 years); Santiago, Chile
- Cause of death: Gunshot wounds (suicide by cop)
- Occupations: Businessman, fence, mercenary, and arms dealer
- Years active: 1960s–2011

Details
- Date: 23 March 2011
- Target: Members of the Investigations Police of Chile
- Killed: 2
- Injured: 6

Italo Jorge Nolli Olivan (27 May 1942 – 23 March 2011) was a Chilean businessman, fence, arms dealer and spree killer. He was a mercenary in the Vietnam War, where he gained a fondness for firearms, which ended with his well-known "day of rage" in March 2011, when he shot and killed two members of the Investigations Police of Chile (Policía de Investigaciones, PDI) in San Bernardo, a commune located in Santiago, and spent the rest of the day in a city-wide persecution, injuring six more policemen before being killed by police fire. Given his actions, there is a notable cult of personality around him in Chile, with him being given several nicknames, including the "Chilean Rambo" and the "King of junk".

== Biography ==
His father was an Italian immigrant characterized by his coldness and often abusive behaviour, which Nolli would go on to replicate in both of his failed marriages. He moved to the United States during the 1960s, where a family member gifted him an automatic weapon which he would take to Vietnam to work as a mercenary during the ongoing war.

In one notable instance, he faked his second wife's death to collect life insurance, but he was quickly found out and imprisoned for 200 days. After police raided his home and found an illegal arsenal of weapons, he was sentenced to an additional 10 years in prison.

After being released, he became involved in organized crime, often acting as a fence for stolen copper wires. According to one of his associates, he received immunity from corrupt police officers, who refused to detain him even though there was a warrant for his arrest for 11 years. On 23 March 2011, he went to San Bernardo to drop off a shipment of stolen copper to one of his associates. On the way back, he was confronted by two detectives from the Investigations Police (Policía de Investigaciones, PDI), Karim Gallardo and Marcelo Morales, who requested to see his identity documents. Nolli refused, and instead shot Morales dead before turning the gun on Gallardo and killing her while she was trying to get away. He also shot at the other two detectives in the PDI's vehicle, but they managed to escape.

After this, he escaped to his house to look for all the weapons he had. He loaded up with four guns and 885 cartridges and spent the rest of the day driving through Central Santiago, shooting and wounding several police officers before ending up dead as the result of return bullet fire from police forces.

According to his partner at the time, he knew he would die that day and wanted to die while shooting. Karim Gallardo gained posthumous fame for being the first female martyr of the PDI.
