= Access to Justice =

Nigeria-focused human rights organization based in Lagos

- Abbreviation: AJ
- Formation: 1999
- Headquarters: Lagos

Access to Justice (AJ) is a Nigeria-focused human rights organization based in Lagos. According to their website, "it is a justice advocacy group working to defend the rights of equal and non-discriminatory access to courts of law, expand access of marginalized people to equal and impartial justice, attack corruption in justice administration, support legal struggles for human dignity and disseminate legal resources that help achieve these purposes." Founded in 1999, AJ pursues their goals through three related programs: Judicial Integrity and Independence Programme; Legal Access Programme; and Legal Resources Programme. They publish books, journals, and articles in support of their work.

== Partnerships ==
Access to Justice has frequently partnered with other human rights organizations in pursuit of specific issues. In June 2010, Access to Justice joined with Amnesty International, Human Rights Watch, and several other Nigerian human rights organizations in calling on state governments not to resume the execution of prisoners. In April 2009, they joined Amnesty International and many other Africa-based NGOs in issuing a statement, calling on the government of Sudan "to stop harassing and intimidating human rights defenders and staff of national and international aid and human rights organizations."

== Awards and recognition ==
Access to Justice was one of the winners of the 2009 MacArthur Award for Creative & Effective Institutions. This award is granted to small organizations who bring fresh approaches to long standing problems. The award by MacArthur Foundation was in recognition of access to justice's work towards reviving the coroner system in the Nigerian legal system, investigating suspicious deaths.

Access to Justice was also the winner of the 2010 Gani Fawehinmi prize for Human Rights and Social Justice. The Nigerian Bar Association, who sponsored the prize, praised Access to Justice for providing legal representation, and for their litigation and advocacy work.

== See also ==
- Human rights in Nigeria
