= Crime in Chile =

Numerous factors have caused the immensely crime rates in Latin America. Two significant factors that have been influencing violence are high poverty rates and consistently high amounts of drug trafficking. Note the relatively low poverty rate in Chile and the low amounts of drug seizure. Data: UNODC, 2012.

Crime in Chile is investigated by the Chilean police. However, unlike the majority of Latin America, criminal activity in Chile is low, making Chile one of the most stable and safest nations in the region. Various analysts and politicians concur that in the 2020s crime in Chile is on the rise to levels similar to the rest of Latin America. Increased murder rates and illegal drug trade are attributed by some to illegal immigration, others attribute the rise of crime more generally as the result of increased globalization.

== Crime by type ==
=== Murder ===
In 2012, Chile had a murder rate of 3.1 per 100,000 population. There were a total of 550 murders in Chile in 2012. In 2017, the United Nations Office on Drugs and Crime informed a rate of 4.3 intentional homicide rate per 100,000 population.

=== Corruption ===
As of 2006, there were isolated reports of government corruption in Chile. Transparency International's annual Corruption Index recorded that the Chilean public perceived the country as relatively free of corruption.

=== Domestic violence ===
Violence against women was prevalent across all classes of Chilean society until 1994. As of the early 1990s, it was reported that domestic violence affects about fifty percent of the women in Chile. The Intrafamily Violence Law passed in 1994 was the first political measure to address violence in the home, but because the law would not pass without being accepted by both sides, the law was weak in the way it addressed victim protection and punishment for abusers. The law was later reformed in 2005. In 2019, amid the ongoing Catholic sex abuse crisis in Chile, non-retroactive legislation was passed removing the statute of limitations for trying people for committing sex abuse against children in Chile.

=== Theft of ore ===
Theft of ore from mines have occurred on different scales in Chile. Theft of copper cathode has been carried out both during its transport by train and inside the properties of the mining companies. Theft of copper cathode and gold concentrate have since the mid-2010s been done increasingly by means of robbery. Most illegal mining in Chile is deemed equivalent to small-scale theft of ore from prospects or closed mines.

An instance of systematic large-scale theft occurred between 2011 and 2014 when an estimated US$10.4 million (as of 2016) worth of copper concentrate were unloaded during transport and replaced by tailings and concrete debris. The ore concentrate loads originated from Escondida mine and were destined to Potrerillos copper smelter following an agreement between Minera Escondida and Codelco. The companies Confinor, Minex and ENAMI were investiaged for possession of stolen goods related to the disappeared ore.

== Historical crime ==
=== Banditry and piracy ===
During the 19th and early 20th century banditry was widespread in Araucanía and Central Chile.
