= List of general directors of Carabineros de Chile =

General Director of Carabineros de Chile
- Director General de Carabineros de Chile
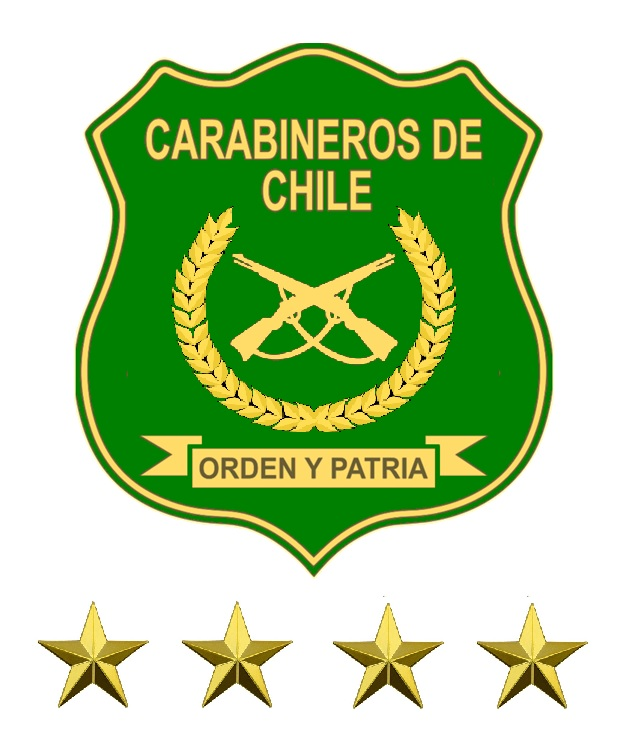
- Emblem of the General Director

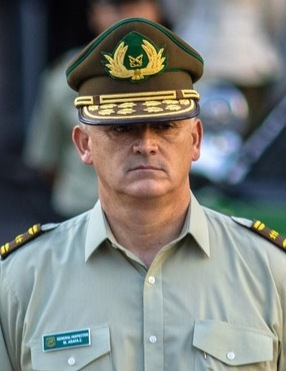
- Incumbent; General Marcelo Araya Zapata since 27 September 2024
- Carabineros de Chile
- Reports to: Minister of the Interior and Public Security
- Appointer: President of Chile
- Term length: 4 years
- Formation: 27 February 1924
- First holder: Carlos Ibáñez del Campo
- Salary: CL$4,584,068

This article lists the general directors of Carabineros de Chile. Carabineros de Chile (transl. Carabiniers of Chile) are the Chilean national police force, who have jurisdiction over the entire national territory of Chile, and dates back to 1927.

The current General Director is General Marcelo Araya Zapata. He was appointed by former President Gabriel Boric on 27 September 2024.

== List ==
=== Cuerpo de Carabineros General Commander (1924–1927) ===
Portrait	Rank	Name	Took office	Left office
	Lieutenant Colonel	Carlos Ibáñez del Campo	27 February 1924	21 July 1927

=== Cuerpo de Carabineros General Director (1927–1931) ===
Portrait	Rank	Name	Took office	Left office
	Brigadier General	Aníbal Parada Pacheco	1927	1928
	Army Colonel	Julio Olivares Mengolar	1928	1929
	Brigadier General	Agustín Moreno Ladrón de Guevara	1929	1929
	Brigadier General	Fernando Sepúlveda Onfray	1929	1930
	Brigadier General	Ambrosio Viaux Aguilar	1930	1931

=== Carabineros de Chile General Director (1931–present) ===
Portrait	Rank	Name	Took office	Left office
	General	Manuel Concha Pedregal	1931	1932
	General	Humberto Arriagada Valdivieso	1932	1938
	General	Oscar Reeves Leiva	1938	1942
	General	Pedro Silva Calderón	1942	1944
	General	Eduardo Maldonado Mercado	1944	1947
	General	Reynaldo Espinoza Castro	1947	1950
	General	Humberto Meneses Madrid	1950	1952
	General	Jorge Ardiles Galdames	1952	1958
	General	Arturo Queirolo Fernández	1958	1964
	General	Vicente Huerta Celis	1964	1970
	General	José María Sepúlveda	1970	11 September 1973 (deposed)
	General	César Mendoza Durán	11 September 1973	2 August 1985 (resigned)
	General	Rodolfo Stange Oelckers	2 October 1985	16 October 1995
	General	Fernando Cordero Rusque	16 October 1995	27 November 1997
	General	Manuel Ugarte Soto	27 November 1997	27 November 2001
	General	Alberto Cienfuegos Becerra	27 November 2001	27 November 2005
	General	José Alejandro Bernales	27 November 2005	29 May 2008
	General	Eduardo Gordon Valcárcel	29 May 2008	2 September 2011
	General	Gustavo González Jure	8 September 2011	8 September 2015
	General	Bruno Villalobos Krumm	8 September 2015	12 March 2018
	General	Hermes Soto Isla	29 March 2018	22 December 2018
	General	Mario Rozas Córdova	22 December 2018	19 November 2020
	General	Ricardo Yáñez Reveco	19 November 2020	27 September 2024
	General	Marcelo Araya Zapata	27 September 2024	Incumbent

== See also ==
- Carabineros de Chile
  - La Moneda Palace Guard
- Ministry of National Defense (Chile)
- Ministry of the Interior and Public Security (Chile)
