= Dorothy Pérez =

Chilean lawyer, jurist and academic

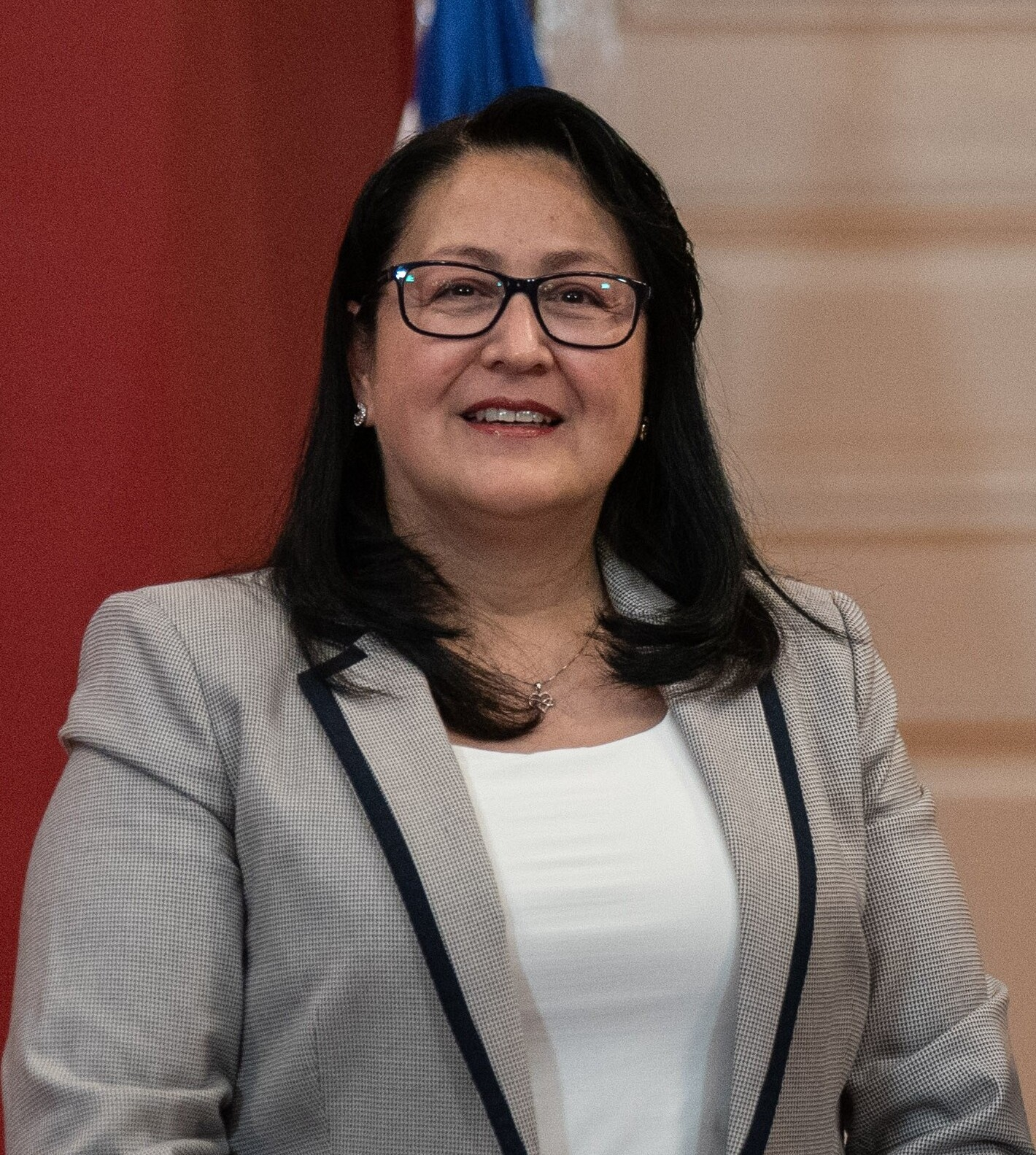

Comptroller General of the Republic of Chile
- Incumbent
- Assumed office November 6, 2024
- President: Gabriel Boric Font
- Preceded by: Jorge Bermúdez Soto

Deputy Comptroller General of the Republic of Chile
- In office December 3, 2018 – November 18, 2023
- President: Sebastián Piñera (2018–2022); Gabriel Boric Font (2022–2023)
- Preceded by: María Soledad Frindt
- Succeeded by: Víctor Merino Rojas
- In office September 12, 2016 – August 22, 2018
- President: Michelle Bachelet (2016–2018); Sebastián Piñera (2018–2018)
- Preceded by: Patricia Arriagada Villouta
- Succeeded by: María Soledad Frindt

Personal details
- Born: Dorothy Aurora Pérez Gutiérrez; March 3, 1976 (age 50) Santiago, Santiago Metropolitan Region, Chile
- Spouse: Fabián López Paredes
- Children: 2
- Education: Liceo Miguel de Cervantes y Saavedra
- Alma mater: University of Chile
- Profession: Lawyer

Dorothy Aurora Pérez Gutiérrez (born March 3, 1976) is a Chilean lawyer, jurist, and academic who has served as Comptroller General of the Republic of Chile since November 6, 2024. She is the first woman to hold the position since its establishment in 1927. Pérez has spent most of her career within the Comptroller General's Office, where she previously served twice as Deputy Comptroller General and as Acting Comptroller General between 2023 and 2024. Her tenure has been marked by efforts to modernize the institution and by the large-scale investigation into misuse of medical leave within the public sector, known as the Sick Leave Case (Caso Licencias Médicas).

== Early life and education ==
Pérez was born on March 3, 1976, in Santiago. She attended the Liceo Miguel de Cervantes y Saavedra in the capital, graduating in 1992.

She went on to study law at the University of Chile from 1993 to 1997. Her undergraduate thesis, which focused on creating a jurisprudential database using rulings from the Comptroller General of the Republic and Chile's telecommunications regulator, earned the highest possible grade of 7. She graduated with the highest distinction from her law program and was admitted to the bar in April 2004.

Pérez furthered her education with a series of specialized postgraduate degrees. She earned a Master's in Management with a focus on Control from the Pontifical Catholic University of Valparaíso (1996) and a Master's in Management and Public Policy from the Adolfo Ibáñez University (1998). She also completed postgraduate diplomas in Economic Administrative Law from the Pontifical Catholic University of Chile, with specializations in regulation, public services, and environmental law (2002–2003), followed by diplomas in Artificial Intelligence from the same university and in Fraud Prevention, Detection, and Investigation from her alma mater, the University of Chile.

== Career ==
=== Early career and rise in the Comptroller's Office (2000s–2015) ===
In addition to her work in public service, Pérez has taught law as a lecturer at several leading Chilean universities, including the University of Chile, the Pontifical Catholic University of Chile, and the Diego Portales University.

Pérez's professional career is deeply rooted in the Comptroller General's Office, where she first joined as a reporting lawyer. In this role, she provided legal analysis and drafted rulings for Committee 3, which was then part of the Division of Housing, Urban Development, Public Works, and Transport (since reorganized as the Division of Infrastructure and Regulation).

She gained regional experience between 2005 and 2006, serving as a reporting lawyer at the Regional Comptroller's Office for the remote Magallanes and Chilean Antarctica Region. In 2007, she was appointed head of the Toma de Razón and Registry Unit in the Valparaíso regional office, a key role involving the legal review and approval of government decrees. Her performance led to her appointment as Regional Comptroller of Valparaíso in December 2007, a senior executive position she held until 2010. She then returned to the central office in Santiago, where she was promoted to Deputy Head of the Administrative Audit Division and later to Head of the Corporate Committee within the Legal Division.

From March 2014 to December 2015, Pérez took on a role outside the Comptroller's Office, serving as Head of the Legal Division at the Ministry of Education during the second administration of President Michelle Bachelet. In this capacity, she led the ministry's legal team and on several occasions served as the acting Undersecretary of Education, temporarily stepping in for Valentina Quiroga.

=== First term as Deputy Comptroller General (2016–2018) ===
Pérez returned to the Comptroller's Office in January 2016 as Chief of Staff to the Comptroller General, a strategic role that positioned her at the center of the institution's operations. Her rapid ascent continued when she was appointed Deputy Comptroller General and Judge of Accounts on September 12 of that year, making her the second-highest-ranking official in the agency. Her portfolio included coordinating institutional protocol, managing official communications, and supervising related reporting functions.

Tensions within the Comptroller's Office surfaced publicly in 2018, culminating in disagreements with Comptroller General Jorge Bermúdez over administrative matters. These included disputes regarding the institution's social media strategy and a cartoon mascot named "Contralorito," which Pérez argued raised concerns over its content and potential copyright infringement. According to her subsequent court testimony, Bermúdez also expressed frustration that senior government officials were bypassing him to communicate directly with her.

=== Dismissal and reinstatement (2018) ===
The internal conflict culminated in August 2018, when Comptroller General Bermúdez requested her resignation. This came shortly after it was revealed that Pérez had been summoned as a witness by prosecutors investigating the "Pacogate" scandal, a major fraud case within the Carabineros de Chile (the national police force). The Comptroller's Office had indirect oversight of the police through a unit that Pérez had previously led.

Challenging her dismissal as arbitrary, Pérez, represented by lawyer Ciro Colombara, filed a constitutional protection appeal. She won a significant legal victory when the Court of Appeals ruled in her favor, a decision that was later upheld by the Supreme Court, which ordered her immediate reinstatement.

=== Second term as Deputy and Acting Comptroller (2018–2024) ===
Following her reinstatement, Pérez's responsibilities were scaled back, focusing primarily on her judicial duties as a Judge of Accounts. In a move to avoid any potential conflict of interest, she formally recused herself from matters involving the Carabineros in her 2022 public interest disclosure, citing her husband's former career as an officer in the institution.

Her career reached a new pinnacle when she was appointed Acting Comptroller General from December 18, 2023, to November 4, 2024, steering the office after the previous comptroller's term ended.

== Comptroller General (2024–present) ==
Pérez was sworn in as Comptroller General of the Republic on November 6, 2024, following her nomination by President Gabriel Boric and confirmation by the Senate. Her appointment to the nine-year term (2024–2032) marked a historic milestone, making her the first woman to lead the institution since its founding in 1927. Her confirmation was welcomed by prominent figures like former President Bachelet, who praised Pérez's professional record and commitment to transparency.

=== Tenure and priorities ===
Upon taking office, Pérez outlined a reform agenda centered on three key pillars: modernizing the institution, strengthening preventive oversight, and increasing scrutiny of high-priority sectors such as healthcare, education, and local governments. In her inaugural address, she emphasized the need to align the Comptroller's Office with contemporary standards of transparency and efficiency in public administration.

=== Sick Leave Case (Caso Licencias Médicas) ===
A defining initiative of Pérez's tenure has been a high-profile investigation into the systemic abuse of sick leave by government employees, a scandal that became known as the "Caso Licencias Médicas." The probe revealed that between 2023 and 2024, more than 25,000 public officials had left Chile while on approved medical leave. The findings triggered 6,600 administrative investigations and led to roughly 1,100 resignations, including several senior officials.

The investigation employed large-scale data analytics, cross-referencing over five million sick leave records from the Social Security Superintendency (Suseso) with more than one million international travel records from the Investigative Police (PDI).

Before the Senate, Pérez advocated for expanding her office's legal authority to strengthen its audit capabilities, a proposal that ignited debate among lawmakers and legal experts. The collected evidence was forwarded to the Public Ministry and the Council for the Defense of the State (CDE) for potential criminal prosecution and civil liability actions.

In a second phase launched in June 2025, the investigation widened to include other data sources, revealing officials on sick leave had visited casinos, toured national parks, and received traffic fines in regions far from their declared place of medical rest.

Testifying before the Chamber of Deputies, Pérez stated these measures were necessary to "deter public officials" from fraud, noting specific cases where individuals engaged in activities like gambling and long-distance travel that were inconsistent with their claimed medical conditions.

=== Participation in Enade 2025 ===
On October 14, 2025, the comptroller was invited as a keynote speaker at the National Business Meeting (Enade), in a presentation considered unprecedented for an auditing authority. From the outset, her participation attracted significant media attention and was met with a standing ovation from the audience, marking a milestone in the public visibility of the Office of the Comptroller General of the Republic.

During her presentation, Pérez reported on the results of several audits and investigations, highlighting the detection of more than 25,000 public employees who left the country while on medical leave. She also noted a 32.4% decrease in the issuance of sick leaves for mental health reasons since May 2025, attributed to stronger administrative controls. Additionally, she criticized delays in public procedures, citing, for example, 704 pending permits at the National Monuments Council and administrative processes taking over 800 days.

In her speech, she incorporated cultural and symbolic elements, such as a reference to the poem The Pleasure of Serving by Gabriela Mistral, and used metaphorical imagery — such as “ants united floating on a lake” — to emphasize the importance of interinstitutional collaboration. In a rare moment for this type of event, she also referred to a joke by Chilean comedian Bombo Fica, in the context of discrepancies found in the weighing of seized narcotics, prompting laughter and a lighter moment in the audience.

Subsequently, some of the data presented by the comptroller became controversial. The National Monuments Council publicly denied the figure of 704 pending permits, clarifying that there were no outstanding requests at the time of the presentation. This incident sparked debate regarding the accuracy of oversight information and the use of public statistics in high-profile settings.

Pérez's presentation was widely discussed in the media and by political analysts, who highlighted the unusual nature of her participation in a high-profile business forum, as well as the balance she struck between technical content, clear communication, and institutional positioning. Her appearance was considered a key moment in establishing a new leadership style within the Office of the Comptroller General.

=== Request for personal data of transgender minors ===
In January 2026, the Comptroller General's Office sent an official request to the Ministry of Health (Minsal) seeking information related to minors enrolled in gender identity support programs. The request included data such as national identification number (RUT), social and legal name, gender identity, date of birth, program entry and exit dates, hospital where they receive care, and the status of the respective programs.

After reviewing the request, Minsal decided not to submit the requested information, arguing considerations related to personal data protection and existing regulations. Subsequently, the Comptroller reiterated the request and warned that, if non-compliance persisted, it could exercise its legal powers to impose administrative sanctions, including fines or the suspension of the responsible authority.

In parallel, the Children's Ombudsperson sent a confidential document to the Comptroller's Office urging the agency to adjust its actions to national and international legislation on the protection of children's rights, in a position similar to that adopted by Minsal.

Additionally, a user of the Gender Identity Support Program and the Minsal Trans Health Program filed an Action of Rights Protection against the request, arguing that it violated the Personal Data Protection Law and affected the right to privacy. The appeal was admitted for processing by the San Miguel Court of Appeals.

== Personal life ==
Pérez has been married to Fabián López Paredes since 2001. Her husband is a retired Major from the Carabineros de Chile and formerly served as a helicopter pilot. The couple has two children.
