= Pacogate =

Police corruption scandal involving Carabineros de Chile

Pacogate is corruption scandal involving Carabineros de Chile, Chile's main police force. The scandal revolves around a scheme for misappropriation of public funds. Pacogate begun to be investigated in 2016 while the actions investigated occurred between 2006 and 2017.

== Background ==
In 2015, BancoEstado identified irregular movements in a current account belonging to Carabineros de Chile. The bank reported this on December 9 of that year to General Flavio Echeverría, head of Finance for the Carabineros. Echeverría claimed at the time that it was a "calculation system error" and that an internal investigation would be conducted to clarify the situation. However, the warning was ignored and the investigation was never carried out.

At the end of 2015, Banco Falabella issued a warning to the Financial Analysis Unit (UAF) of the Ministry of Finance after detecting suspicious activity in the account of Captain Felipe Ávila. Despite having a salary of approximately 2 million pesos, his bank account showed transactions amounting to hundreds of millions of pesos. He kept 10% of the funds, while the rest was distributed among other officers. The alert to the UAF ultimately led, in October 2016, to the opening of an investigation by the Regional Prosecutor’s Office of the Magallanes Region, initiated by Regional Prosecutor Eugenio Campos.

On March 6, 2017, the General Director of Carabineros, Bruno Villalobos, acknowledged the existence of a "major fiscal fraud" within the institution and announced the dismissal of nine officers (including Flavio Echeverría), some as direct participants and others due to command responsibility. On March 15, the case was transferred to the Seventh Court of Guarantee in Santiago, after the court in Punta Arenas declared itself incompetent, as requested by Prosecutor Campos.

== Investigation and Sentences ==
On March 1, 2018, formal charges were filed against the highest-ranking officer involved in the case, former General Director of Carabineros Eduardo Gordon, for the crime of embezzlement of public funds totaling more than 21 billion Chilean pesos. It was the first time a former General Director of Carabineros had been formally charged since the criminal procedure reform in Chile. At that time, Gordon was placed under precautionary measures, including monthly reporting and a travel ban within Chile.

Gordon was later re-indicted in September 2019, this time for the alleged misuse of approximately 70 million pesos. Along with former General Jorge Serrano, he was accused of using institutional funds to purchase personal gifts and of reporting supposed gifts that were never actually given.

In November 2018, former Comptroller General Ramiro Mendoza stated that he had been aware of possible financial irregularities within Carabineros since 2010. However, he decided to annul an internal audit that had been initiated, following a conversation with Eduardo Gordon, who assured him that an internal investigation would be conducted.

According to the Public Prosecutor’s Office, evidence suggests that the fraud began in 2006. Key figures in the alleged criminal network include General Flavio Echeverría, Commander Héctor Nail Bravo, Colonel Jaime Paz Meneses, and Captain Francisco Estrada Castro. In total, 180 individuals were investigated by the Prosecutor's Office, including both uniformed personnel and civilians; 136 of them were formally charged.

The fraud was carried out using three main mechanisms:

- Salary funds: Deposits were made into the personal bank accounts of certain officers, who would then withdraw the money in cash and distribute it among other participants, keeping 10% for themselves. This was the method that triggered the initial alert at Banco Falabella.
- Severance funds: Transfers were made from severance accounts to salary accounts in order to cover deficits caused by the operation.
- Allowance funds: Excess funds were deposited into the accounts of unsuspecting personnel, who were then instructed to return the surplus through a supposed reimbursement procedure. In reality, they were told to deposit the funds into a private account associated with the criminal network, under the impression that it belonged to Carabineros.

The first convictions in the Pacogate case were issued in May 2019, involving five former Carabineros and one civilian. All six had served as account holders, allowing their personal bank accounts to be used for the deposit of illicit funds. By October 2019, more than 50 individuals who acted as account holders had been convicted for their involvement in the fraud.

In a separate but related part of the investigation, preparations began in September 2019 for the trial of 31 individuals identified as the leaders of the criminal organization. These were officers who allegedly designed and organized the fraud scheme. They faced charges of embezzlement of public funds, money laundering, and participation in a criminal association.

== Possible New Irregularities ==
In June 2018, Comptroller General Jorge Bermúdez Soto raised concerns about a possible new case of accounting irregularities within Carabineros, this time involving the Directorate of Welfare and an amount exceeding 23 billion Chilean pesos. Initial indications included the absence of accounting records and the destruction of documents by fire. The then-head of the Welfare Directorate, Mario Rozas, responded that the missing documents had been destroyed in accordance with the institution’s internal protocols.

== Consequences and Reactions ==
The case had a negative impact on public perception of the police force. According to the Cadem survey, Carabineros' positive approval rating fell from 77% in February 2017 to 52% in July of the same year. Meanwhile, the CEP survey reported a decline in positive evaluation from 54% in January 2017 to 37% in June 2017. From 2018 onward, the institution’s image continued to deteriorate, further affected by the Operación Huracán scandal.

As a result of the Pacogate case and the Operación Huracán, and the resulting crisis within Carabineros, a restructuring of the high command was carried out in March 2018. In total, 15 generals were retired by decision of General Director Hermes Soto.

General Director Mario Rozas — who took office following the removal of Hermes Soto after the killing of Camilo Catrillanca — stated in January 2019 that the crisis occurred "because we failed to control, to observe what was happening in our environment. Because we believed ourselves self-sufficient and ignored what was happening around us", and that "the only way out of this crisis is by listening to criticism and taking responsibility, because we must acknowledge that we were arrogant as an institution".
