= Manuel Ugarte =

Manuel Ugarte may refer to:

- Manuel Ugarte (writer) (1875–1951), Argentine writer
- Manuel Ugarte Soto (born 1940), Chilean police officer and lawyer
- Manuel Ugarte (footballer) (born 2001), Uruguayan footballer
