= José Alejandro Bernales =

General Director José Alejandro Bernales
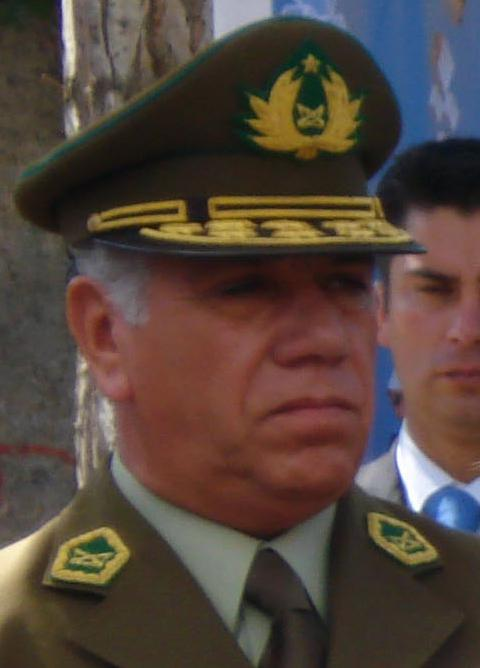

General Director of Carabineros de Chile
- In office 27 November 2005 – 29 May 2008
- President: Ricardo Lagos; Michelle Bachelet
- Preceded by: Alberto Cienfuegos
- Succeeded by: Eduardo Gordon

Personal details
- Born: 29 January 1949 Santiago, Chile
- Died: 29 May 2008 (aged 59) Panama City, Panama
- Education: Carabineros School

Military service
- Allegiance: Chile
- Branch/service: Carabineros de Chile
- Rank: General Director
- Commands: Carabineros de Chile

José Alejandro Bernales Ramírez (29 January 1949 – 29 May 2008) was a Chilean police officer who served as General Director of Carabineros de Chile from 2005 until his death in 2008. He was appointed by President Ricardo Lagos, succeeding Alberto Cienfuegos, and remained in office during the first presidency of Michelle Bachelet.

== Early life and education ==
Bernales was born in Santiago, Chile, on 29 January 1949, the son of José Bernales Muñoz and Yolanda Ramírez Baeza. He completed his primary education at Escuela N.º 8 in Santiago and his secondary education at Liceo Guillermo Labarca Hubertson.

Bernales entered the Carabineros School on 16 March 1970 and graduated on 16 January 1972 as a second lieutenant of Order and Security. He subsequently attended the Academy of Police Sciences, qualifying as a graduate officer and institutional instructor. He obtained a master's degree in Police Sciences and Public Security and specialised in police intelligence and mountain and border policing. He also completed courses in effective leadership and organisational leadership at the Pontifical Catholic University of Chile.

In 1975, he married Teresa Bianchini Frost, with whom he had three sons.

== Police career ==
Following his graduation, Bernales was assigned to the 7th Police Station in Valparaíso, and later served at the 3rd Police Station in the same city and at the Carabineros training unit in Los Andes. After his promotion to lieutenant in 1973, he continued serving in Los Andes before assignments to the Highway Police, Special Forces and the institution's Intelligence Directorate.

As a captain, Bernales held a number of positions between 1980 and 1988, including assignments within the General Deputy Directorate. He subsequently entered the Academy of Police Sciences. He was promoted to major in December 1988 and spent much of the following years working in specialised police intelligence.

Following his promotion to lieutenant colonel in 1993, Bernales served as academic deputy director of the Academy of Police Sciences and later as deputy director and director of the Carabineros Non-Commissioned Officers School. He was promoted to colonel in 1997 and, in October 1998, was appointed director of the Carabineros School.

Bernales was promoted to general in November 1999. As a general officer, he commanded the VII Carabineros Zone in the Maule Region and subsequently the IX Zone in the Araucanía Region. In December 2003, he was promoted to General Inspector and appointed director of the National Intelligence Directorate, a position he held until becoming General Director.

== General Director of Carabineros ==
On 27 November 2005, Bernales assumed office as General Director of Carabineros following his appointment by President Ricardo Lagos, succeeding Alberto Cienfuegos.

During his tenure, Carabineros implemented its Bicentennial Strategic Plan for 2006–2009, which established institutional priorities in areas including police operations, management and community relations. His administration also oversaw improvements to police stations and infrastructure and an expansion of the training capacity of the institution.

Bernales became known for maintaining a visible public profile and for emphasising closer relations between Carabineros and the civilian population. His leadership and public presence contributed to his becoming one of the institution's most widely recognised figures during the period.

== Death ==
On 29 May 2008, Bernales died at the age of 59 in a helicopter crash in Panama City, while participating in an official visit to Panama. His wife, Teresa Bianchini, and several members of the Chilean delegation were also killed in the accident.

Following his death, General Inspector Eduardo Gordon, then General Deputy Director of Carabineros, assumed command of the institution on an acting basis and was subsequently appointed as Bernales's permanent successor.
