= Fernando Cordero Rusque =

Chilean military officer (died 2020)

Fernando Cordero
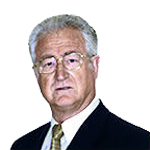

Member of the Senate of Chile
- In office 11 March 1998 – 11 March 2006
- Preceded by: Vicente Huerta Celis
- Succeeded by: End of Appointed Senators
- Constituency: Appointed Senador

Commander-in-Chief of Carabineros
- In office 16 October 1995 – 27 November 1997
- President: Eduardo Frei Ruiz-Tagle
- Preceded by: Rodolfo Stange
- Succeeded by: Manuel Ugarte Soto

Personal details
- Born: 28 April 1939 Valparaíso, Chile
- Died: 24 January 2020 (aged 80) Santiago, Chile
- Spouse: Evita Steiner
- Children: 3

Fernando Cordero Rusque (28 April 1939 – 24 January 2020) was a Chilean military officer and politician who served as the General Director of Carabineros and as a Senator.

He served as General Director of Carabineros de Chile from 1995 to 1997, and later as an institutional senator for the period 1998–2006.

== Early life and family ==
Cordero was born in Valparaíso on 28 April 1939. He married Eva Rita Steiner Schwartz, with whom he had three children.

== Professional career ==
He completed his studies at the Conciliar Seminary of La Serena and later entered the Carlos Ibáñez del Campos School of Carabineros on 16 March 1959 as an officer cadet. He graduated on 16 December 1960 with the rank of Second Lieutenant of Order and Security. He subsequently joined the Academy of Police Sciences, where he graduated as an officer of Carabineros of Chile.

After graduation, he served as an institutional instructor at various Carabineros training institutions, teaching courses in Criminalistics, Command Psychology, Police Tactics, Law Enforcement, Professional Ethics, National Defense, Sociability, Ceremonial and Protocol, Police Instruction, and Weapons and Firearms Training.

He served in various cities and localities throughout Chile, both in the south and the north of the country, including La Serena, Los Ángeles, Mulchén, Palena, Futaleufú, Viña del Mar, Tierra del Fuego, and Santiago. During his career, he was promoted on multiple occasions.

== Public career ==
In 1989, he was promoted to the rank of General, serving as Director of Education and later as Director of Information Technology and Telecommunications. In 1993, he was appointed General Inspector, serving as Director of Logistics and Inspector of Carabineros. The following year, he was appointed Deputy Director General of Carabineros, and between 1995 and 1997 he served as General Director of Carabineros of Chile.

He carried out various missions representing Chile and Carabineros abroad, including in Brazil, the United States, Panama, Ecuador, Argentina, Uruguay, Israel, Italy, France, and Egypt.

In 1997, he was appointed an institutional senator by the National Security Council, in his capacity as former Director General of Carabineros of Chile, in accordance with the Constitution then in force, serving for the 1998–2006 term.

In the 2005 parliamentary elections, he ran as a candidate for the Chamber of Deputies for District No. 8 (Coquimbo, Ovalle, and Río Hurtado) in the Coquimbo Region, representing the Independent Democratic Union. He obtained the second-highest vote total with 18,648 votes (18.02% of the valid votes cast) but was not elected due to the Concertación coalition’s doubling of the list.

Cordero died in Santiago on 24 January 2020.
