= José María Sepúlveda =

Chilean police officer and politician

General Director of Carabineros de Chile
- In office 3 November 1970 – 11 September 1973
- President: Salvador Allende
- Preceded by: Vicente Huerta
- Succeeded by: César Mendoza

Minister of Lands and Colonization
- In office 9 August 1973 – 11 September 1973
- President: Salvador Allende
- Preceded by: Roberto Cuéllar
- Succeeded by: Diego Barba Valdés

Personal details
- Born: 25 August 1917 Curicó, Chile
- Died: 9 October 1988 (aged 71) Santiago, Chile
- Party: API

José María Sepúlveda Galindo (25 August 1917 – 9 October 1988) was a Chilean police officer and politician. A member of the Independent Popular Action, he served as general director of Carabineros de Chile from 1970 to 1973 and as minister of lands and colonization of Chile in 1973.
