= César Mendoza =

Chilean general

Cesar Mendoza Durán
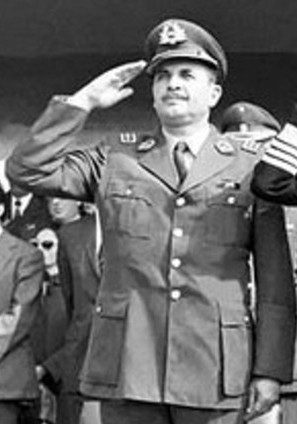
- Mendoza in the mid-1970s

General Director of Carabineros de Chile
- In office 11 September 1973 – 2 August 1985
- Preceded by: José María Sepúlveda
- Succeeded by: Rodolfo Stange

Member of the Government Junta of Chile
- In office 11 September 1973 – 2 August 1985

Personal details
- Born: 11 September 1918 Santiago, Chile
- Died: 13 September 1996 (aged 78) Santiago, Chile
- Party: Independent
- Spouse: Alicia Godoy (m. 1948)
- Children: 2

Military service
- Allegiance: Chile
- Branch/service: Carabineros de Chile
- Years of service: 1941–1987
- Rank: General Director

César Mendoza
Medal record

Representing Chile

Equestrian

Olympic Games
Silver medal – second place	1952 Helsinki	Team Jumping

Pan American Games
Gold medal – first place	1951 Buenos Aires	Team Jumping
Gold medal – first place	1959 Chicago	Team Dressage
Bronze medal – third place	1959 Chicago	Individual Dressage

General César Leonidas Mendoza Durán (September 11, 1918 – September 13, 1996) was a member of the Government Junta which ruled Chile from 1973 to 1990, representing the country-wide police force, the Carabineros de Chile.

Mendoza was born in Santiago, the youngest of the eleven children of Atilio Mendoza Valdebenito, a science teacher and first mayor of La Cisterna, and Amalia Durán, a pianist. In 1938, young César Mendoza began his compulsory military service. In 1940, he matriculated at the Carabineros' School, from which he graduated as a second lieutenant the following year. Mendoza worked in different cities during his police career, starting in 1942 as a lieutenant at Molina, Talca, and the Carabineros' School. He was promoted to captain in 1953, to major in 1959, to lieutenant colonel in 1965, to colonel in 1968, to general in 1970, and to general inspector in 1972. On 10 September 1973 Mendoza was the eighth in rank in the Chilean Police Corps, a professional military body which could have stood up to the army in defense of the Allende government. He agreed to join the coup leaders who promoted him to General Director. In this position, he eventually formed part of the Government Junta that came into power in the September 11 1973 coup d'état (which coincidentally happened on Mendoza's birthday). Of the four members of the Junta (who represented the Chilean Army, Air Force, Navy and Carabineros or National Police), Mendoza was widely considered the one who held the least power and influence, even being derisively referred to as Mendocita.

Mendoza served in the Government Junta until August 2, 1985, where the public outcry from Caso Degollados led to his forced resignation. He was replaced by Rodolfo Stange Oelckers.

A noted horseman, Mendoza won a silver medal in the XV Olympic Games of 1952 at Helsinki as a member of the show jumping team in the equestrian event.

Political offices
Preceded by None	Member of Government Junta; 1973–1985	Succeeded by Rodolfo Stange
Police appointments
Preceded by José María Sepúlveda	General Director of Carabineros; 1973–1985	Succeeded by Rodolfo Stange
