= Rodolfo Stange =

Chilean politician (1925–2023)

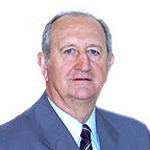

Member of the Senate of Chile
- In office 11 March 1998 – 11 March 2006
- Preceded by: Bruno Siebert
- Succeeded by: Carlos Kuschel
- Constituency: 17th Circusmcriptioon

Commander-in-Chief of Carabineros
- In office 2 August 1985 – 16 October 1995
- President: Augusto Pinochet; Patricio Aylwin; Eduardo Frei Ruiz-Tagle
- Preceded by: César Mendoza
- Succeeded by: Fernando Cordero Rusque

Member of the Military Junta
- In office 2 August 1985 – 11 March 1990
- President: Augusto Pinochet
- Preceded by: César Mendoza
- Succeeded by: Office abolished

Personal details
- Born: 30 September 1925 Santiago, Chile
- Died: 26 November 2023 (aged 98) Santiago, Chile
- Party: UDI (2003–2023)
- Spouse: Liliana Toro
- Children: 3
- Parent(s): Guillermo Stange; Filipine Oelckers

Rodolfo Stange Oelckers (30 September 1925 – 26 November 2023) was a Chilean politician who served as a Senator. He was a member of the Government Junta that ruled Chile during the dictatorship period from 1973 to 1990, representing the police force (Carabineros de Chile). He was elected Senator in 1998, finishing his term in 2005.

== Biography ==
Stange was born in Puerto Montt, in southern Chile. He was the son of Osvaldo Stange and Ina Oelckers, of German ancestry, and was a Lutheran. Because of his heritage, he studied at the German Institute of Puerto Montt and later in the Liceo de Hombres. He joined the Military in 1945 and the Carabineros two years later. Thanks to a scholarship, Stange was able to continue his university studies in West Germany and upon his return he became a teacher of Police Sciences and Police Administration.

Stange was married to Liliana Toro Oelckers, with whom he had three children, Sergio, Sonia, and Carolina. According the former Minister of the Interior, Enrique Krauss, Stange was supporter of Colo-Colo.

Rodolfo Stange died on 26 November 2023, at the age of 98.

== Career ==
In 1970, Stange was named Administrative Chief of the School of Carabineros. Later, he was appointed the Coronel Director of the Superior Institute of Carabineros. In 1977, after the 1973 Chilean coup d'état, he became President of the Mining Company of Vallenar. During the dictatorship of Augusto Pinochet, Stange rose through the ranks until becoming General Subdirector of the police force in June 1982.

Following the political fallout of the Caso Degollados ("Case of the slit throats"), when it was learned that Carabineros were responsible for beheading three communist political dissidents, General Director of the Police César Mendoza Durán resigned from his post. On 2 August 1985, Stange was appointed to the post, serving ex officio as a member of the four-member military junta. In 1989, he presided over the inauguration of the Glory and Victory monument, dedicated to the fallen members of the Carabineros. Stange continued serving as General Director after Pinochet's dictatorship ended in 1990.

After finishing his term as General Director of Carabineros in 1995, Stange continued in politics. He joined the Independent Democratic Union and in 1997 was elected to the 17th Senatorial Circumscription (South Los Lagos). While in the Senate, from 1998 to 2006, Stange initially participated in the Commission of the Environment and the Commission of Maritime Issues, Fishing, and Aquaculture. He later joined the Commission of Government, Decentralization and Regionalization, the Commission of Public Works, and the Special Commission of Security. Besides his membership in the Senate, Stange was involved in agriculture and had an import/export business.

== Pinochet regime ==
The general was accused of several human rights cases of abuse, including obstruction of justice charges in the Caso Degollados and the murder of Julio Verne Acosta and Carlos Bezmalinovic, both members of the Revolutionary Left Movement, by high-ranking members of DIPOLCAR (Dirección de Inteligencia de Carabineros de Chile, the police intelligence unit). Nevertheless, his involvement was not proven and he was never convicted of any crimes.

Stange was noted as a "champion" of Colonia Dignidad, a secretive religious enclave with ties to Nazism. The compound, protected by cameras, barbed wire and walls, served as a site for the torture and execution of political dissidents during the Pinochet regime. Leaders of the sect were also accused of extensive child sexual abuse. Stange was reportedly received warmly as a visitor to the Colonia during the dictatorship.

In 2020, the public learned from a leaked document that the Chilean Police planned to rename the Police Sciences Academy after Stange. After public outcry and political controversy over the decision, due to Stange's role in the dictatorship, the administration withdrew the proposed name change.

=== 1988 plebiscite ===
On the night of the 1988 plebiscite which resulted in the victory of the democratic camp and ended Pinochet's rule, Stange, Navy Chief José Toribio Merino, and Air Force Chief Fernando Matthei pushed back against Pinochet's plans to overturn the result of the vote and extend his rule, thus allowing the Chilean transition to democracy to take place as planned.
