= Bruno Siebert =

Chilean Army general (1933–2024)

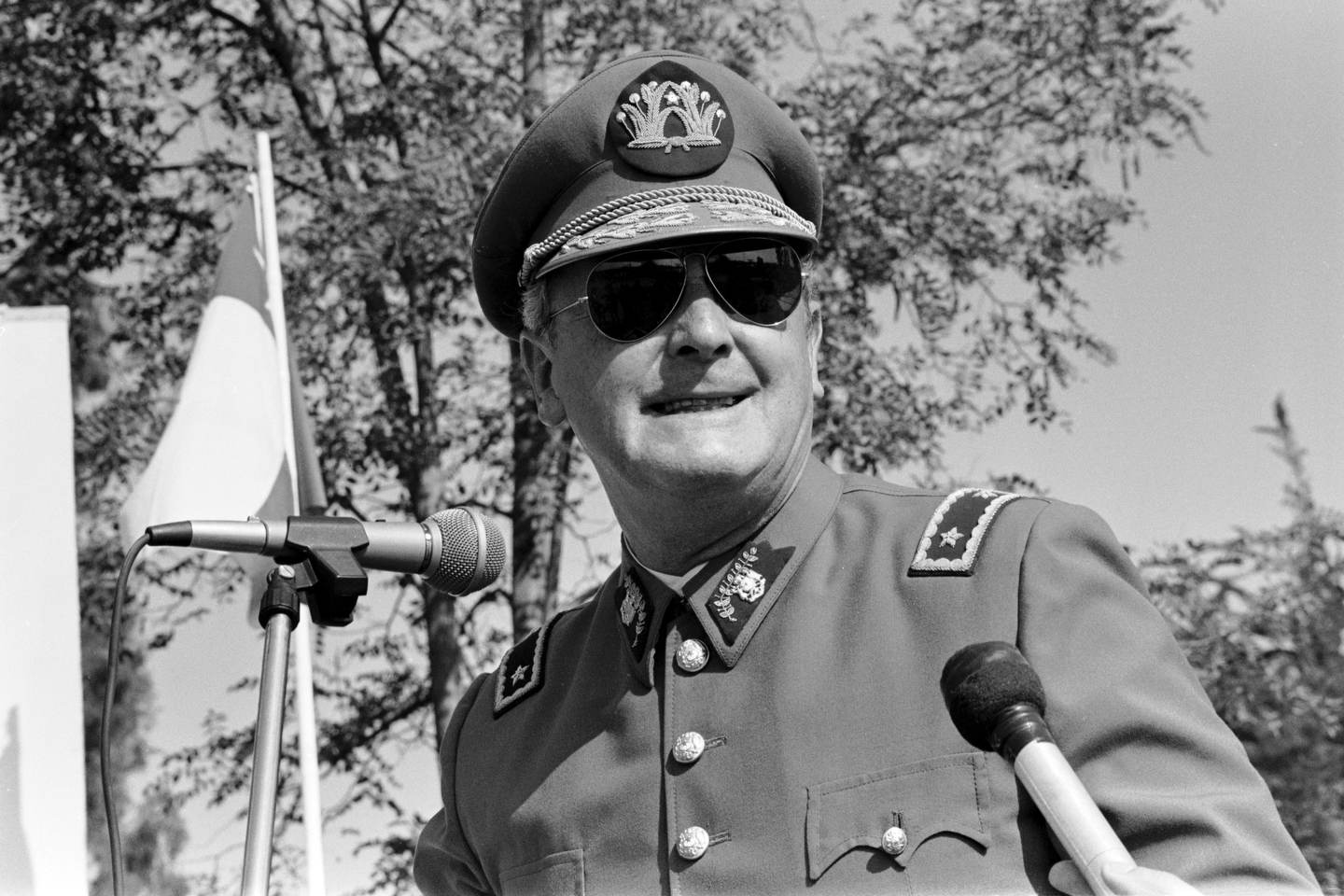

Member of the Senate
- In office 11 March 1990 – 11 March 1998
- Preceded by: District created
- Succeeded by: Rodolfo Stange

Minister of Public Works
- In office 22 April 1982 – 5 June 1989
- President: Augusto Pinochet
- Preceded by: Patricio Torres Rojas
- Succeeded by: Hernán Abad

Military Attaché of Chile to Germany
- In office 1981–1982
- Appointed by: Augusto Pinochet
- Chancellor: René Rojas Galdames

Intendant of Osorno Province
- In office 1974 – 1 January 1976
- Appointed by: Augusto Pinochet

Personal details
- Born: 13 March 1933 Puerto Octay, Chile
- Died: 19 May 2024 (aged 91) Santiago, Chile
- Party: Renovación Nacional (RN) (1990–1998)
- Spouse: Gesa Wendt
- Children: Three
- Education: Bernardo O'Higgins Military Academy

Bruno Guillermo Siebert Held (13 March 1933 – 19 May 2024) was a Chilean Army general, who served as Minister of Public Works (1982–1989) and as a member of the Senate (1990–1998).

From 1980 to 1982 he also served as the military attaché at Chile's embassy in Bonn, Federal Republic of Germany. Siebert died on 19 May 2024, at the age of 91.

== Biography ==
=== Family and youth ===
He was born in Puerto Octay on 13 March 1933. He was the son of Johann Siebert Sprenger and Erna Amalie Held Winkler. He married Gesa Wendt Zickermann, and they had three children. He died in Santiago on 19 May 2024.

=== Professional career ===
He completed his primary and secondary education at the German School of Frutillar and Osorno. In 1949, he entered the Chilean Military Academy, graduating as an officer in 1952. He joined the Corps of Engineers and obtained the qualification of General Staff Officer.

Between 1966 and 1968, he studied at the Chilean War Academy. In 1971, he traveled to the Federal Republic of Germany to attend the Armed Forces Command and Leadership Academy, where he completed Command and General Staff courses. He remained in Germany until 1972.

Upon his return to Chile, in 1974, he was appointed commander of the Arauco Regiment. In 1977, he joined the Presidential General Staff, and the following year served on the Advisory Committee of the Military Government Junta, where he was appointed deputy head.

In 1980, he was appointed Military, Naval, and Air Attaché at the Chilean Embassy in Bonn, Federal Republic of Germany, as well as Air Attaché and concurrent attaché to Switzerland. He held this position until 1982, when he was appointed Commander of Army Engineers and Director of Planning with the rank of Brigadier General.

He also served as a professor of Military History and Strategy at the War Academy. He retired from the Chilean Army in 1988 with the rank of Major General.

== Political career ==
During Augusto Pinochet regime, Siebert served as Provincial Governor and Intendant of Osorno (1974–1976). Then, he was appointed Minister of Public Works, holding office from 22 April 1982 until 5 June 1989.

In the parliamentary elections of December 1989, he ran as an independent candidate for the Senate of Chile within the Democracy and Progress Pact. He was elected senator for the 17th Senatorial District, Los Lagos Region, for the 1990–1998 term, obtaining 66,326 votes (31.12% of valid votes).

Although elected as an independent, on 19 December 1990 he joined National Renewal, resigning from the party in June 1998. He did not seek re-election in the 1998 parliamentary elections.

== Sources ==
- BCN Profile
