= Ricardo Yáñez =

Chilean police officer (born 1966)

General Director (R) Ricardo Yáñez
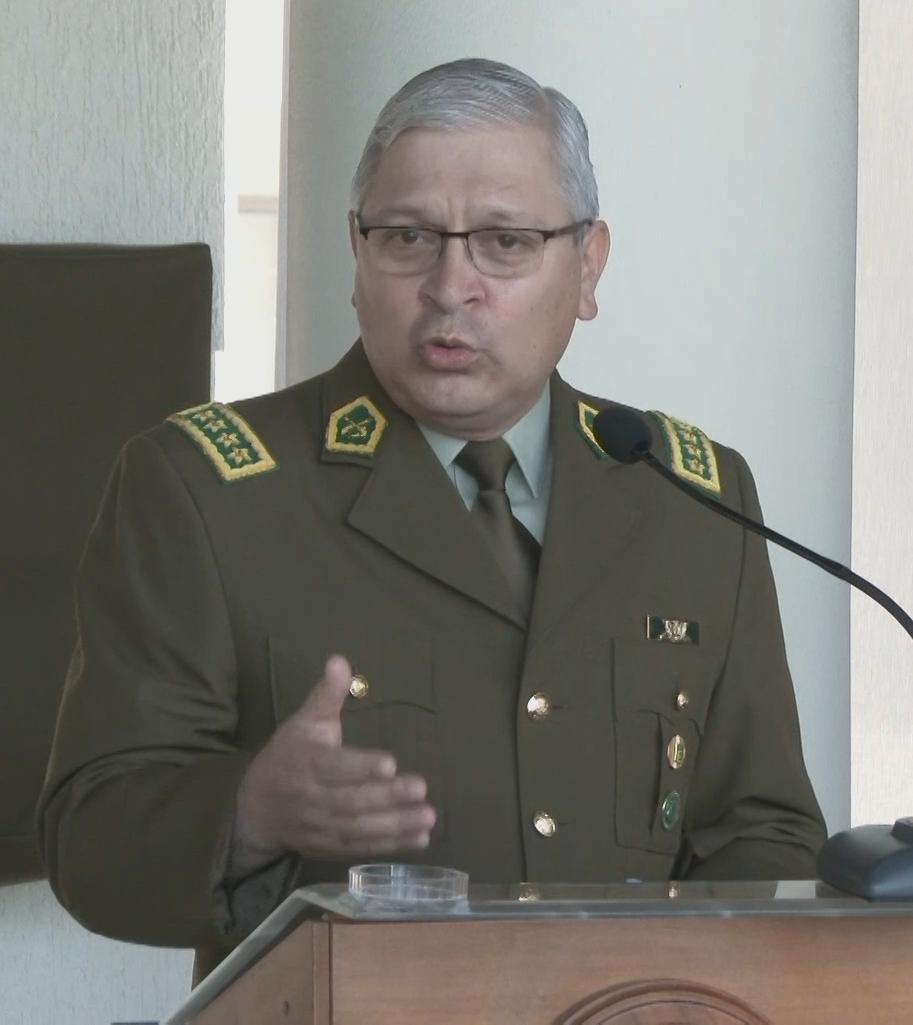

General Director of Carabineros de Chile
- In office 19 November 2020 – 27 September 2024
- President: Sebastián Piñera; Gabriel Boric
- Preceded by: Mario Rozas
- Succeeded by: Marcelo Araya

Personal details
- Born: 27 September 1966 (age 60) San Fernando, Chile
- Education: Carabineros School

Military service
- Allegiance: Chile
- Branch/service: Carabineros de Chile
- Rank: General Director
- Commands: Carabineros de Chile

Ricardo Yáñez Reveco (born 27 September 1966) is a retired Chilean police officer who served as General Director of Carabineros de Chile from 2020 to 2024. He was appointed to the position by President Sebastián Piñera following the resignation of General Mario Rozas.

== Early life and education ==
Yáñez was born in San Fernando, Chile, on 27 September 1966. He entered the Carabineros School in 1985 and graduated as a second lieutenant in 1988.

During his career, he undertook specialised studies in traffic and road safety and qualified as a graduate officer in Police Sciences. He also completed studies in strategic management and senior police administration.

== Police career ==
Yáñez served in a variety of operational and administrative appointments during his career. His early assignments included police units in Santiago and other parts of the country, before he progressively assumed command and staff responsibilities.

He specialised in traffic and road safety and held several posts related to that field. Among his senior appointments, he served as head of the Traffic, Highways and Road Safety Department and later as prefect of the Santiago Oriente Prefecture.

After his promotion to general, Yáñez served as head of the VI Carabineros Zone in the O'Higgins Region. He subsequently became National Director of Order and Security, one of the institution's principal operational commands.

In 2018, he was promoted to General Inspector and appointed National Director of Order and Security. In that capacity, he was responsible for the planning, coordination and supervision of preventive and operational police services throughout Chile.

== General Director of Carabineros ==
On 19 November 2020, President Sebastián Piñera appointed Yáñez General Director of Carabineros following the resignation of General Mario Rozas. He assumed leadership of the institution during a period of organisational reform and modernisation following the 2019–2020 Chilean protests.

During his tenure, Carabineros continued a programme of institutional modernisation that included changes to police training, operational procedures, accountability mechanisms and the incorporation of new technologies. His administration also promoted measures intended to strengthen territorial policing and the institution's operational capabilities.

Yáñez remained General Director following the inauguration of President Gabriel Boric in March 2022. His command subsequently focused on public-order operations, organised crime, border security and the strengthening of police capabilities amid increased government attention to security policy.

On 27 September 2024, Yáñez resigned as General Director shortly before the end of his statutory term. President Boric accepted his resignation and appointed General Inspector Marcelo Araya Zapata as his successor.
