= Glory and Victory =

Monument in Santiago, Chile

- Gloria y Victoria
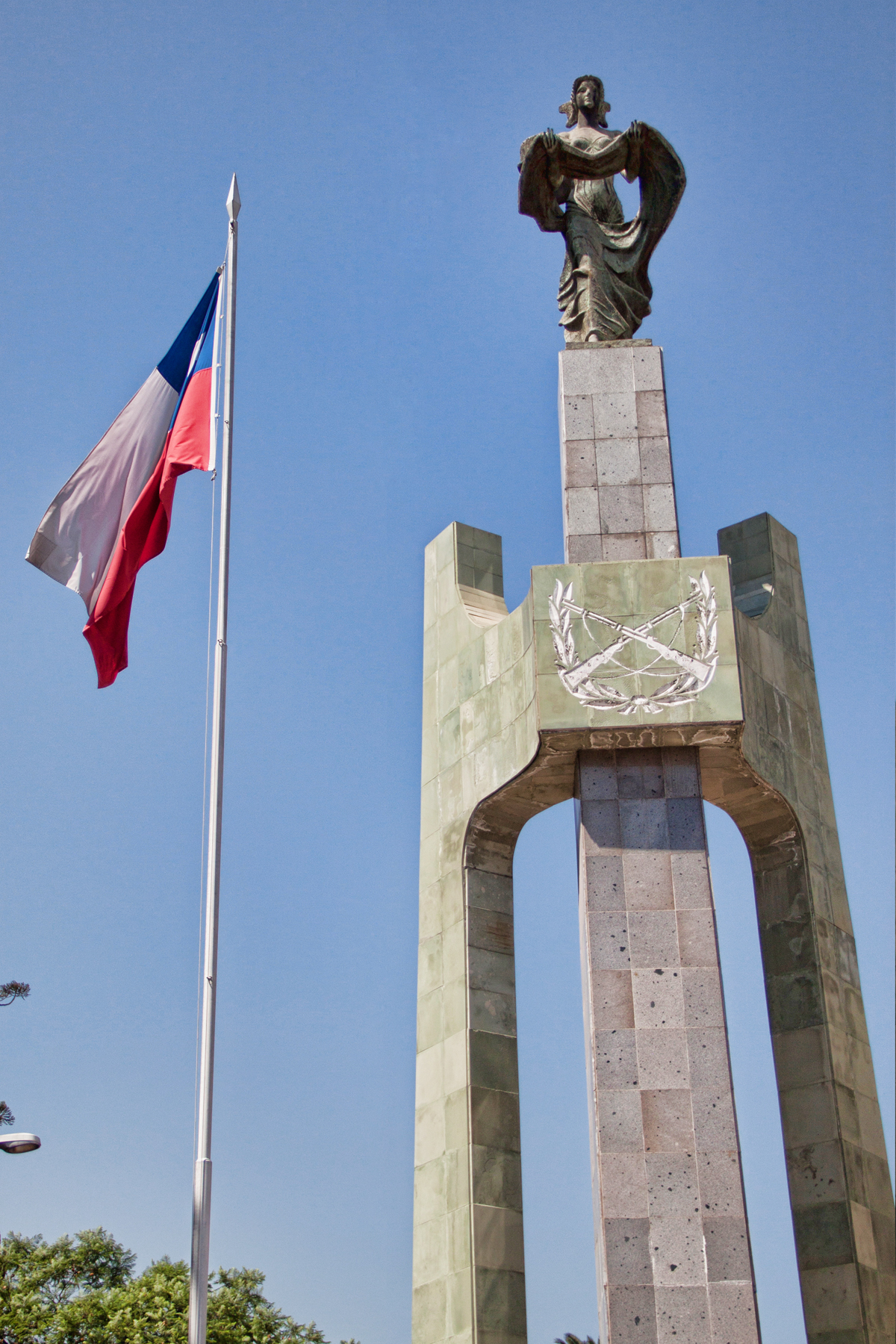
- Monument in 2015
- Interactive map of Glory and Victory
- Location: Santiago, Chile
- Opening date: 26 April 1989
- Dedicated to: Fallen officers of the Carabineros de Chile

Glory and Victory (Spanish Gloria y Victoria) is the name of the memorial dedicated to the fallen members of the Carabineros de Chile, the Chilean uniformed police, who died in the line of duty. Located along Libertador General Bernardo O'Higgins Avenue at approximately the 200 block in Santiago, the capital of Chile, the monument is constructed of concrete covered with stone slabs and stands 23 m (75 ft) tall. The work was created by Chilean sculptor Héctor Román Latorre.

== History ==
The creation of the monument was authorized under Law No. 18,614, enacted on 27 April 1986, with the sponsorship of the then general director of Carabineros, Rodolfo Stange Oelckers. Its purpose is to commemorate and honor the police officers who have died in the line of duty while serving the State of Chile, from the founding of the institution in 1927 to the present day. The monument was formally inaugurated during a solemn ceremony on 26 April 1989, one day before the commemoration of the institution's 62nd anniversary.

In November and December 2019, during the protest movement associated with the social unrest, the monument—located near Plaza Baquedano—was attacked by hooded individuals and sustained graffiti and other damage.

== Iconography ==
The monument is composed of three columns, with the two lateral ones partially enclosing the central shaft and supporting the emblem of the Carabineros de Chile. At the top of the central column—taller than the flanking elements—stands a female figure, an allegorical representation of the “glory” and “victory” attained by the police officers who died in the line of duty. She holds the shrouds of the fallen officers in gratitude for the sacrifice of their lives.
