= Mario Rozas =

Chilean police officer (born 1967)

General Director (R) Mario Rozas
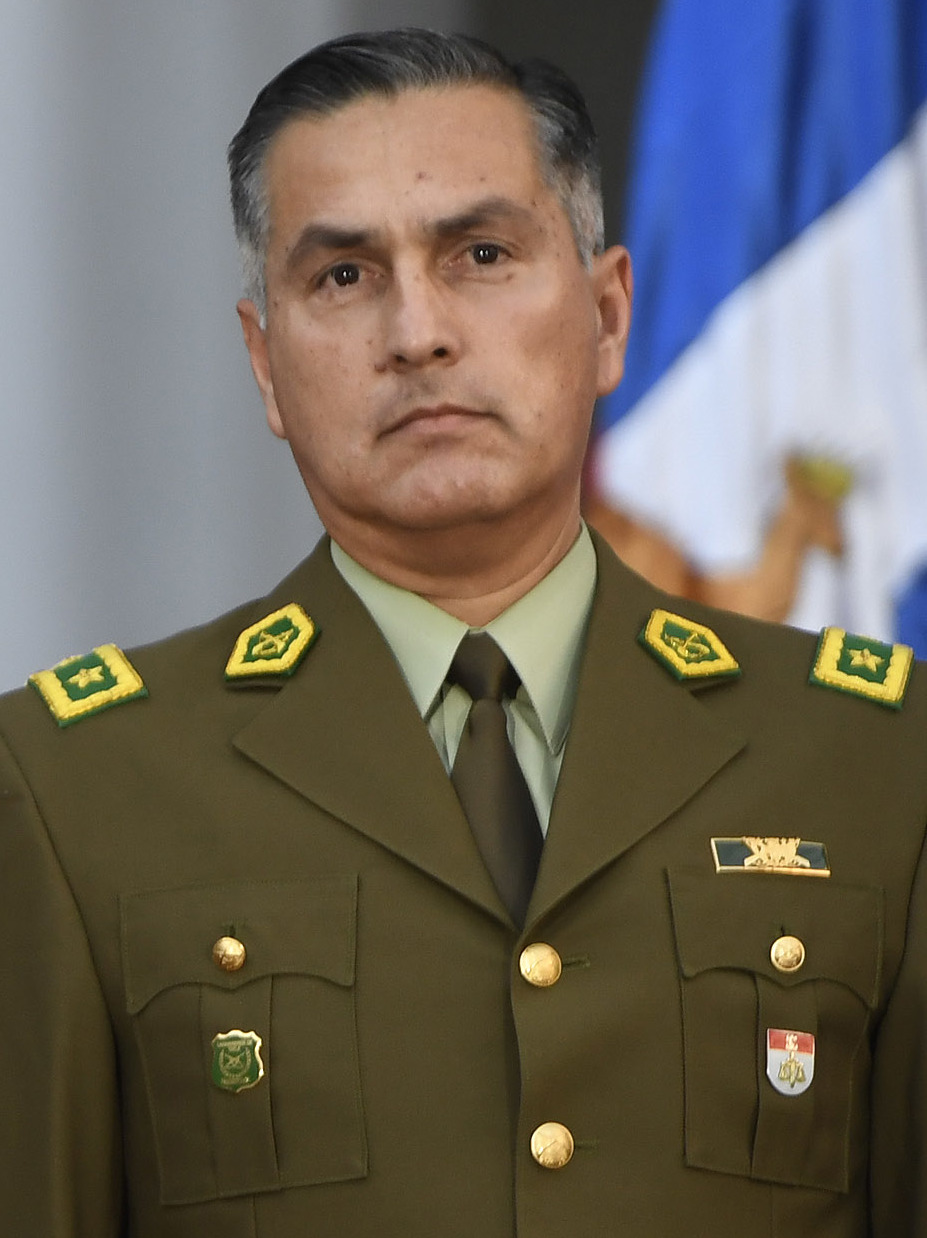

General Director of Carabineros de Chile
- In office 22 December 2018 – 19 November 2020
- President: Sebastián Piñera
- Preceded by: Hermes Soto
- Succeeded by: Ricardo Yáñez

Personal details
- Born: 2 February 1967 (age 59) Linares, Chile
- Spouse: Carola Ajenjo
- Children: 2
- Education: Carabineros School; Universidad del Desarrollo

Military service
- Allegiance: Chile
- Branch/service: Carabineros de Chile
- Rank: General Director
- Commands: Carabineros de Chile

Mario Alberto Rozas Córdova (born 2 February 1967) is a retired Chilean police officer and journalist who served as General Director of Carabineros de Chile from 2018 to 2020. He was appointed by President Sebastián Piñera in December 2018, succeeding General Hermes Soto, and led the institution during the 2019–2020 Chilean protests.

== Early life and education ==
Rozas was born in Linares, Chile, on 2 February 1967. He comes from a family closely associated with Carabineros: his father, Mario Rozas Ortiz, was a major warrant officer in the institution, while two of his brothers also joined the police. He is married to Carola Ajenjo, an officer of Carabineros, with whom he has two children.

He graduated from the Carabineros School in 1987. Rozas later studied journalism at the Universidad del Desarrollo and obtained a master's degree in communications.

== Police career ==
During his career, Rozas held operational and territorial assignments in different parts of Chile and developed experience in specialised areas including traffic, highways, road safety and institutional communications.

Among his assignments, he served in the Communications Department of Carabineros and later as police attaché at the Chilean embassy in Spain. During the first presidency of Sebastián Piñera, from 2010 to 2014, he served as a presidential aide-de-camp.

Rozas was promoted to general as part of the Carabineros high command for 2018, approved under President Michelle Bachelet.

In March 2018, he was appointed director of Welfare of Carabineros, a position responsible for institutional welfare services and programmes for police personnel and their families.

== General Director of Carabineros ==
In December 2018, President Sebastián Piñera requested the removal of General Director Hermes Soto amid the institutional crisis that followed the killing of Camilo Catrillanca. On 21 December, Piñera announced Rozas as Soto's successor, and he assumed office the following day. At the time of his appointment, Rozas was serving as director of Welfare.

Upon his appointment, the government tasked Rozas with continuing the modernisation and reform of Carabineros. He stated that the institution would continue implementing its modernisation plans while maintaining its focus on crime prevention and public service.

Rozas's tenure was dominated by the 2019–2020 Chilean protests, which began in October 2019. Carabineros conducted extensive public-order operations during the demonstrations. The Office of the United Nations High Commissioner for Human Rights subsequently reported cases of unnecessary and disproportionate use of less-lethal weapons by police, resulting in numerous injuries, and recommended strengthening training and protocols concerning the policing of demonstrations.

On 19 November 2020, following a police operation at the Carlos Macera children's home in Talcahuano in which two minors were wounded, Rozas submitted his resignation to President Piñera, who accepted it. Piñera subsequently appointed General Ricardo Yáñez as the new General Director of Carabineros.
