= Manuel Ugarte Soto =

Chilean police officer (1940–2024)

General Director (R) Manuel Ugarte

General Director of Carabineros de Chile
- In office 27 November 1997 – 27 November 2001
- President: Eduardo Frei Ruiz-Tagle; Ricardo Lagos
- Preceded by: Fernando Cordero Rusque
- Succeeded by: Alberto Cienfuegos

Personal details
- Born: 29 July 1940 Santiago, Chile
- Died: 19 February 2024 (aged 83) Santiago, Chile
- Education: Carabineros School; Pontifical Catholic University of Valparaíso (LL.B)

Military service
- Allegiance: Chile
- Branch/service: Carabineros de Chile
- Rank: General Director
- Commands: Carabineros de Chile

Manuel Heriberto Ugarte Soto (29 July 1940 – 19 February 2024) was a Chilean police officer who served as General Director of Carabineros de Chile from 1997 to 2001, during the presidencies of Eduardo Frei Ruiz-Tagle and Ricardo Lagos. During his tenure, Carabineros implemented the Plan Cuadrante de Seguridad Preventiva, while Mireya Pérez Videla became the first woman to attain the rank of general in the institution.

== Early life and education ==
Ugarte was born in Santiago, Chile, on 29 July 1940. He completed his primary and secondary education at Liceo Manuel Barros Borgoño before entering the Carabineros School as an officer candidate on 16 March 1959.

He graduated from the Carabineros School in December 1960 as a second lieutenant of Order and Security and was assigned to the 1st Police Station of Viña del Mar.

During his career, Ugarte also studied law at the Pontifical Catholic University of Valparaíso. He graduated in Police Sciences and specialised in mountain and border services.

== Police career ==
Ugarte spent the early part of his career in the Valparaíso Region, where he remained until 1977. That year, with the rank of captain, he was transferred to the 4th Police Station of the Arica Prefecture. In 1979, he entered the Higher Institute of Carabineros as a student.

He subsequently held assignments in different parts of Chile, including Arica, Curicó, Linares and Santiago. His professional career included both operational and senior administrative responsibilities within Carabineros.

In March 1987, Ugarte was promoted to colonel and appointed head of the Carabineros cabinet attached to the Government Junta, where he was associated with its Third Legislative Commission. He was promoted to general in 1989.

Ugarte continued to rise through the senior command during the 1990s. He was promoted to General Inspector in 1993, became Director of Personnel in 1994 and, by 1995, was the second-ranking officer in Carabineros.

== General Director of Carabineros ==
On 27 November 1997, Ugarte became General Director of Carabineros, succeeding General Fernando Cordero Rusque. He headed the institution for four years, serving under Presidents Eduardo Frei Ruiz-Tagle and Ricardo Lagos.

One of the principal institutional initiatives of his tenure was the implementation of the Plan Cuadrante de Seguridad Preventiva. Introduced initially as a pilot programme in 1998, the model divided police jurisdictions into defined sectors and sought to improve preventive policing through the allocation of personnel and resources according to the characteristics and policing requirements of each area.

Carabineros also implemented changes in institutional management during Ugarte's command. According to the institution, improvements in its budget and the outsourcing of some support functions were intended to reduce administrative burdens and make more police personnel available for operational duties.

In 1998, Colonel Mireya Pérez Videla was promoted to general during Ugarte's tenure, becoming the first woman to attain that rank in the history of Carabineros and the first woman in Latin America to hold the rank of general in a uniformed police force.

The final years of Ugarte's command coincided with several high-profile criminal investigations, including the Jorge Matute Johns case and the crimes committed in Alto Hospicio. Before leaving office, he publicly acknowledged institutional shortcomings in the handling of some cases and expressed frustration over unresolved human-rights issues.

Ugarte completed his term and retired from active service on 27 November 2001. He was succeeded as General Director by Alberto Cienfuegos.

== Later life and death ==
Ugarte published Por los verdes senderos del deber in 2001, a work concerning his experiences and career in Carabineros.

Ugarte died at Clínica Alemana de Santiago on 19 February 2024, aged 83, after suffering a stroke. His wake was held at the Carabineros School.

== Works ==
- Por los verdes senderos del deber (2001)
