= Jorge Bermúdez Soto =

Chilean comptroller (born 1969)

Jorge Bermúdez
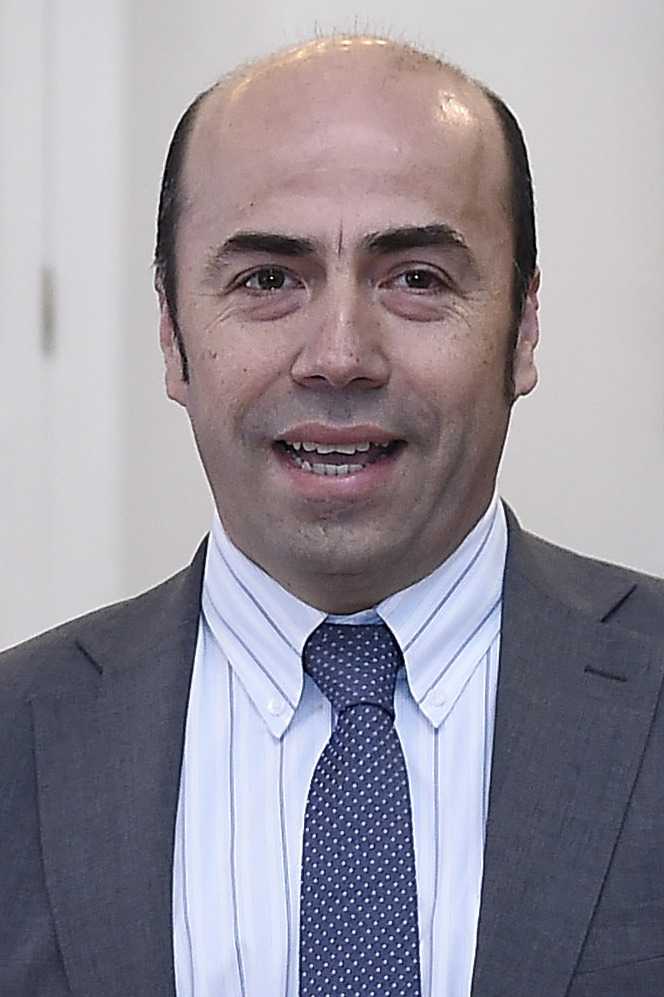

Comptroller General of Chile
- In office 17 December 2015 – 3 November 2024
- President: Michelle Bachelet (2014−2018); Sebastián Piñera (2018−2022); Gabriel Boric (2022–2024)
- Preceded by: Ramiro Mendoza
- Succeeded by: Dorothy Pérez Gutiérrez

Personal details
- Born: 8 July 1969 (age 57) Santiago, Chile
- Education: Pontifical Catholic University of Valparaíso (BA); Autonomous University of Madrid (MA and PhD); University of Giessen (Post-doctorate); Heidelberg University (Post-doctorate)
- Profession: Lawyer

Jorge Bermúdez Soto (born 8 July 1969) is a Chilean lawyer and former General Comptroller of Chile.

== Early life ==
He completed his whole education at the Salesianos de Valparaíso School, from where he graduated in 1986.

Bermúdez studied law at the Pontificia Universidad Católica de Valparaíso, where he was the independent president of the Centro de Alumnos de Derecho along with socialist activists during the 1990−93 period. He obtained his BA in 1993.

== Career ==
Bermúdez was a lawyer for the Valparaíso Region National Forestry Corporation (1995) and for the Environment Unit of the State Defense Council (1998−99).

During the Concertación governments, he was a lawyer for the legal division of the Undersecretariat of Fisheries (2001−02), advisor on environmental regulation issues of the Undersecretariat of Fisheries (2003−11), consultant in the project CONAMA−GEF «Proposal for homologation and expansion of management and protection categories for the conservation of marine and coastal areas» and legal advisor on environmental issues of ENAP (2008−10).

In his status of expert, Bermúdez defended to the ministers of education Yasna Provoste (2008) and Harald Beyer (2013) in their respective impeachments.

In 2008, he was a member of the advisory council of experts that promoted the «institutional strengthening of the Office of the Comptroller General of the Republic in its role of promoting transparency and probity in public management in Chile», which pursued alternatives to strengthen transparency, to seek to modernize the State Administration and to control of corruption.

In 2012, Bermúdez performed as head of the Legal Department of the Cabinet of the Minister of National with the specific goal to eliminate the 10% reserved contribution to the Chilean Army. In 2013, he worked as an advisor on administrative and environmental regulation issues of the Environmental Assessment Service. In 2014, he advised the Superintendency of the Environment.

On 16 December 2015, he was unanimously ratified by the Senate as the new Comptroller General of the Republic.
