= Vicente Huerta =

Chilean Army general (1913–2008)

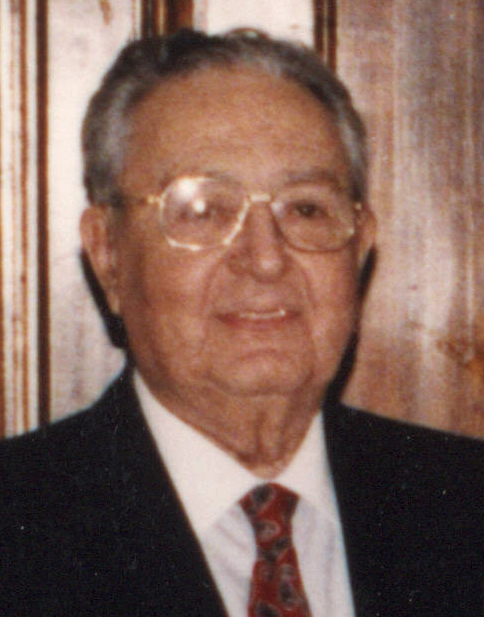

Designed Senator
- In office 11 March 1994 – 11 March 1998

General Director of Carabineros de Chile
- In office 3 November 1964 – 3 November 1970
- President: Eduardo Frei Montalva
- Preceded by: Arturo Queirolo
- Succeeded by: José María Sepúlveda

Personal details
- Born: 15 December 1913 Santiago, Chile
- Died: 8 November 2008 (aged 94) Santiago, Chile
- Spouse: Patricia Leighton
- Children: Four
- Parent(s): Enrique Huerta; Berta Celis
- Education: School of Carabineros de Chile
- Profession: Police Officer

Vicente Huerta Celis (15 December 1913 – 8 November 2008) was a Chilean Army general. He joined the Carabineros de Chile in 1935 and afterwards became a professor at the training academy. In 1971 he moved to the United States to serve as a professor of criminology at the University of California.

Celis returned to Chile in 1973, shortly after the military coup, and from 1976 served on the Council of State. He helped to draft the Chilean Constitution of 1980 and from 1989 served on the National Security Council and, from 1990 to 1998, as a designated senator.

== Biography ==
=== Family and youth ===
He was born in Santiago, Chile, on 15 December 1913. In 1948, he married Patricia Leighton Kirkwood, with whom he had four daughters. He died in Santiago on 8 November 2008.

=== Professional career ===
He completed his primary and secondary education at the Marist Brothers School in Quillota. In 1935, he entered the School of Carabineros, where he was a classmate of Óscar Cristi Gallo. His first assignment took place in 1936 at the General Prefecture of Santiago.

In 1943, he obtained the rank of riding instructor and also became a private aviation pilot. He served as a professor at the School of Carabineros, teaching subjects such as Weapons Knowledge, Automotive Mechanics, Command School, Police Technique, and Command Psychology.

He later became deputy director of the Higher Institute of Carabineros, currently the Academy of Police Sciences, from which he graduated in 1954. The following year, he served as commissioner of the 12th Police Station of San Miguel and was subsequently appointed group chief of the School of Non-Commissioned Officers.

In 1961, he was assigned to Antofagasta, where he served as acting prefect for four years. In 1964, he was transferred to the General Staff of the Northern Inspection Zone, promoted to the rank of General, and appointed Zone Commander. That same year, during the administration of President Eduardo Frei Montalva, he was promoted to Director General of Carabineros of Chile. He voluntarily retired from the institution in 1970.

In 1971, he moved to the United States, where he was hired as a professor of Criminology at the University of California.

== Political career ==
After serving as a professor at the University of California, he returned to Chile in October 1973, one month after the military coup. In 1976, he joined the Council of State in his capacity as former Director General of Carabineros. In May 1988, his appointment to the Council of State was renewed until 1990. As a member of the Council, he participated in the study of the draft of the 1980 Constitution of Chile.

On 19 December 1989, he was appointed by the National Security Council, in accordance with the provisions of the 1980 Constitution then in force, as a designated Senator, in his capacity as former Director General of Carabineros, for the 1990–1998 term.

Among other activities, he authored several study manuals on topics related to his professional specialty, which became mandatory reference texts at the School of Carabineros.
