= Valentina Quiroga =

Chilean engineer, politician (b. 1982)

Valentina Karina Quiroga Canahuate
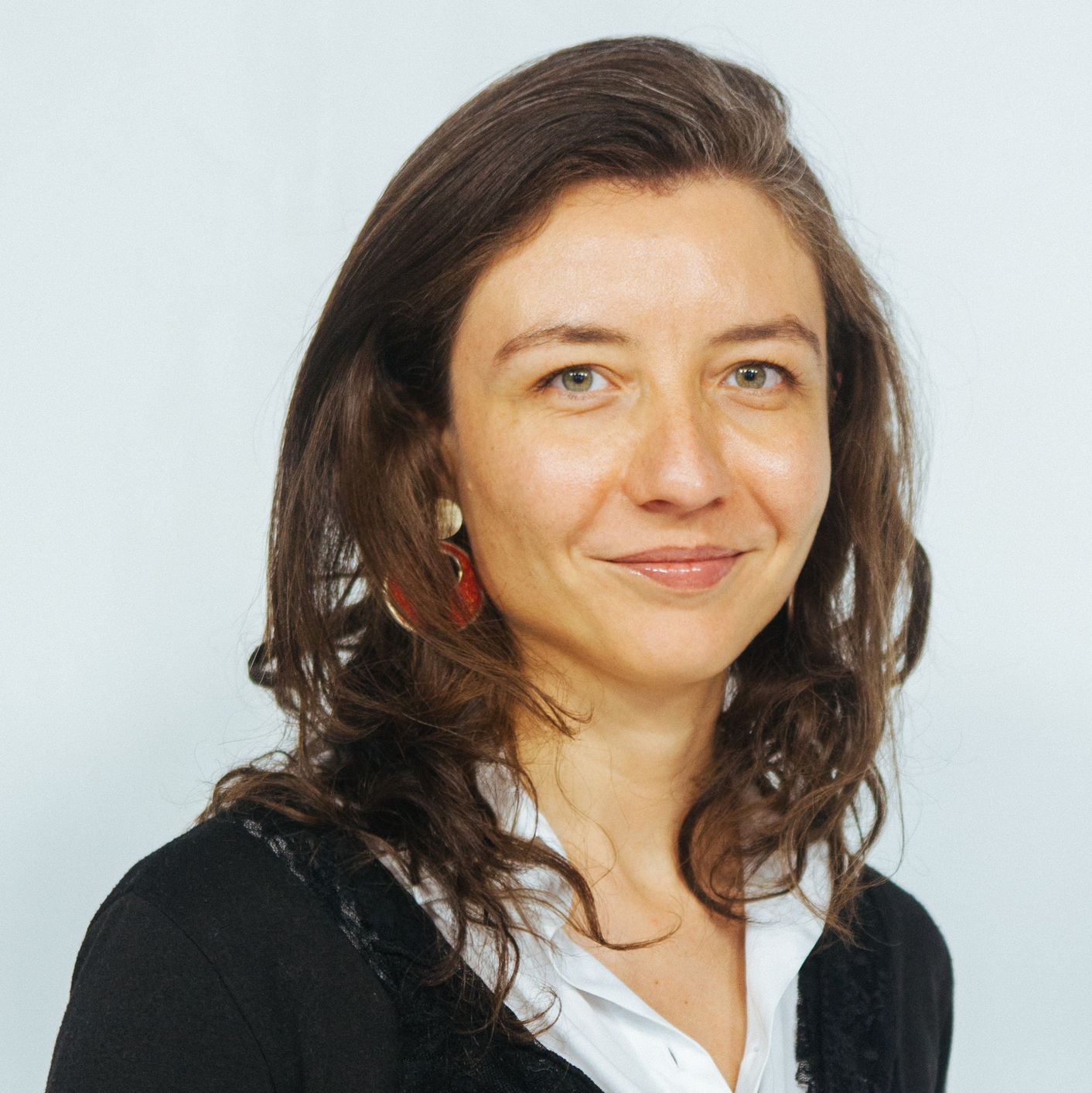
- Valentina Quiroga in 2017
- Born: 3 February 1982 (age 44); Viña del Mar
- Education: University of Chile
- Occupations: Civil engineer, Education undersecretary (2014–2018)
- Known for: one of the founders of the 2008 movement called Education 2020
- Parents: Yanet Patricia Canahuate Eistrup (father); Víctor Hugo Quiroga Villalón (mother)

Valentina Karina Quiroga Canahuate (born Viña del Mar, 3 February 1982) is a Chilean civil engineer and politician. She served as Undersecretary of Education (2014–2018) during the second government of President Michelle Bachelet. Since September 2018 she has been director of the Horizonte Ciudadano Foundation, created by Bachelet.

== Biography ==
She was born the daughter of Víctor Hugo Quiroga Villalón and Yanet Patricia Canahuate Eistrup, both commercial engineers. Valentina Quiroga lived her childhood in Colina and studied at the María Inmaculada de Providencia School, where she was president of the student center. She later entered the civil engineering career with a bachelor's degree earned at the University of Chile. In 2010 she obtained a master's degree in applied economics from the same university, with the thesis The effect of mothers' employment on their children's school performance.

With Mario Waissbluth and others, she was one of the founders of the 2008 movement called Education 2020, for which she served as director of educational policy until 2011. She also served as executive director of the Foundation Public Space.

In 2013 she was in charge of the Education Area of the Government Program for Michelle Bachelet's presidential candidacy. On 4 February 2014, she was appointed as Undersecretary of Education of the elected President Bachelet, replacing Claudia Peirano, who decided not to assume the position when facing questions for her statements against free education and alleged commercial links with private schools.

Quiroga's initial goals as undersecretary included "sending the Educational Reform Bill to Congress, initiating a program to ensure access to higher education for the most vulnerable young people, and signing the first five agreements with universities for the creation of public technical training centers."
