= Bombo Fica =

Chilean humorist

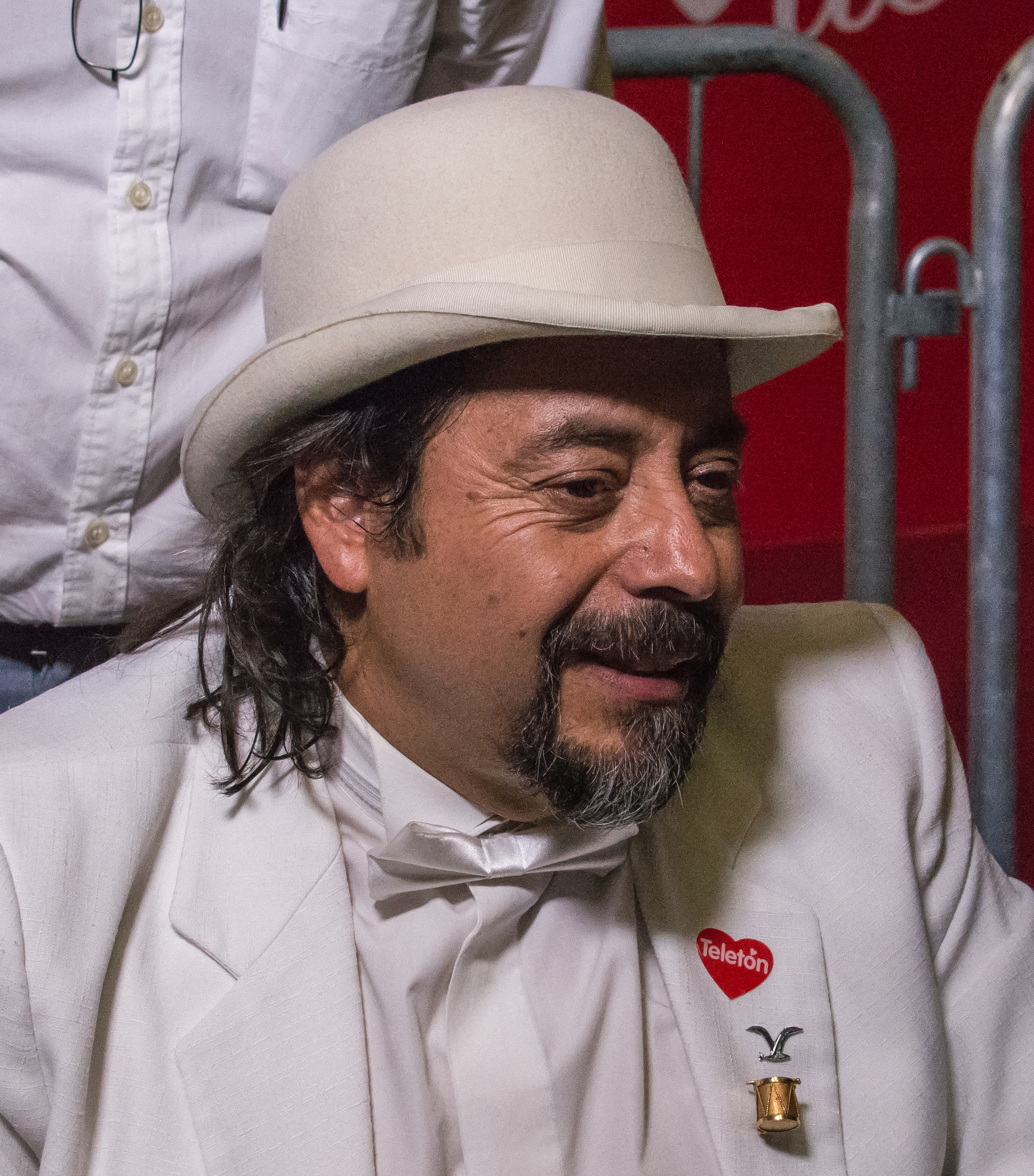
- Born: Daniel Haroldo Fica Roa; September 4, 1963 (age 62); Purén, Chile
- Occupations: Humorist, comedian, actor
- Years active: 1986–present
- Political party: Communist Party of Chile
- Children: Daniela Paz, Sebastián Andrés, Maria Luz Catalina y Mia Patricia

Daniel Haroldo Fica Roa, better known by his artistic name Bombo Fica (born 4 September 1963), is a Chilean humorist, comedian and actor.

== Life and career ==
Daniel Haroldo Fica Roa was born in Purén on September 4, 1963. Fica became known as a comedian in 1986, when he appeared on Éxito and on the "Alegría 86" contest on Sábados gigantes, both programs on Canal 13. Later, he began to participate in a series of television programs, such as Noche de ronda, Viva el lunes, Venga conmigo and in various editions of Teletón, a television marathon broadcast on the national chain. During the 2000s, he integrated his son Sebastián into her routines, whom she introduced as "Bombito".

Within the political area, he has been a member of the Communist Party of Chile since 1990 and re-registered in the party in 2017. That same year he participated in the political interview program Candidato, llegó tu hora arrived on TVN.

In 2009, he performed at the Festival del Huaso de Olmué. On February 24, 2010, he performed for the first time at the Viña del Mar International Song Festival, obtaining the three prizes awarded by the public. During the 2010 World Cup in South Africa, he participated in the Tonka Tanka program on Canal 13. On February 27, 2012, he performed for the second time at the Viña Festival, obtaining four awards and the peak rating of the entire contest.

In 2014, he joined Locos por el Mundial, a Chilevisión program broadcast during that year's FIFA World Cup, held in Brazil. On January 10, 2015, he premiered his program El bar del Bombo y los chistositos, on the same channel, where he was accompanied by other comedians such as Marcos "Charola" Pizarro, Willy Benítez, Jorge "Chino" Navarrete, Óscar Gangas, among others. At the end of that year, he celebrated his three decades of career with the show Como bombo en fiesta, and he also produced and starred in a film with the same name, which was released in 2016.

Bombo Fica was developing through his presentations a type of comedy with contingent humor, caricaturing the national idiosyncrasy, telling fast stories marking a particular, own and recognizable style in the public. His main characteristic in his performances is to be dressed completely in white; In addition, he was originally accompanied by a bass drum, the reason for his stage name. Fica defines his own style as a "contingent, everyday, simple humor".

In November 2017, his third performance was confirmed at the Viña Festival, which he performed on February 20, 2018, after Spanish singer Miguel Bosé. On the occasion he was accompanied by the comedian Willy Benítez, to whom he gave the "silver seagull" delivered by the public, and the singer Mariela Montero.

In July 2019, a wax statue with his figure was presented in the comedian sector of the Las Condes Wax Museum. In 2023 he was presented again in the 52nd version of the Festival del Huaso de Olmué.
