= Eduardo Gordon Valcárcel =

Chilean police officer

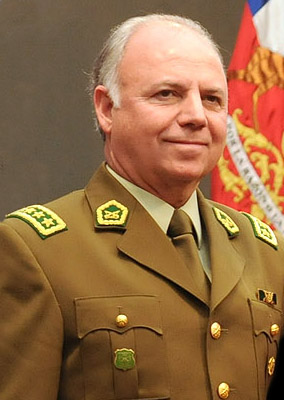

Eduardo Gordon Valcárcel is a Chilean former police officer. He served as general director of Carabineros de Chile from 2008 to 2011.
