= Hermes Soto =

Chilean police officer

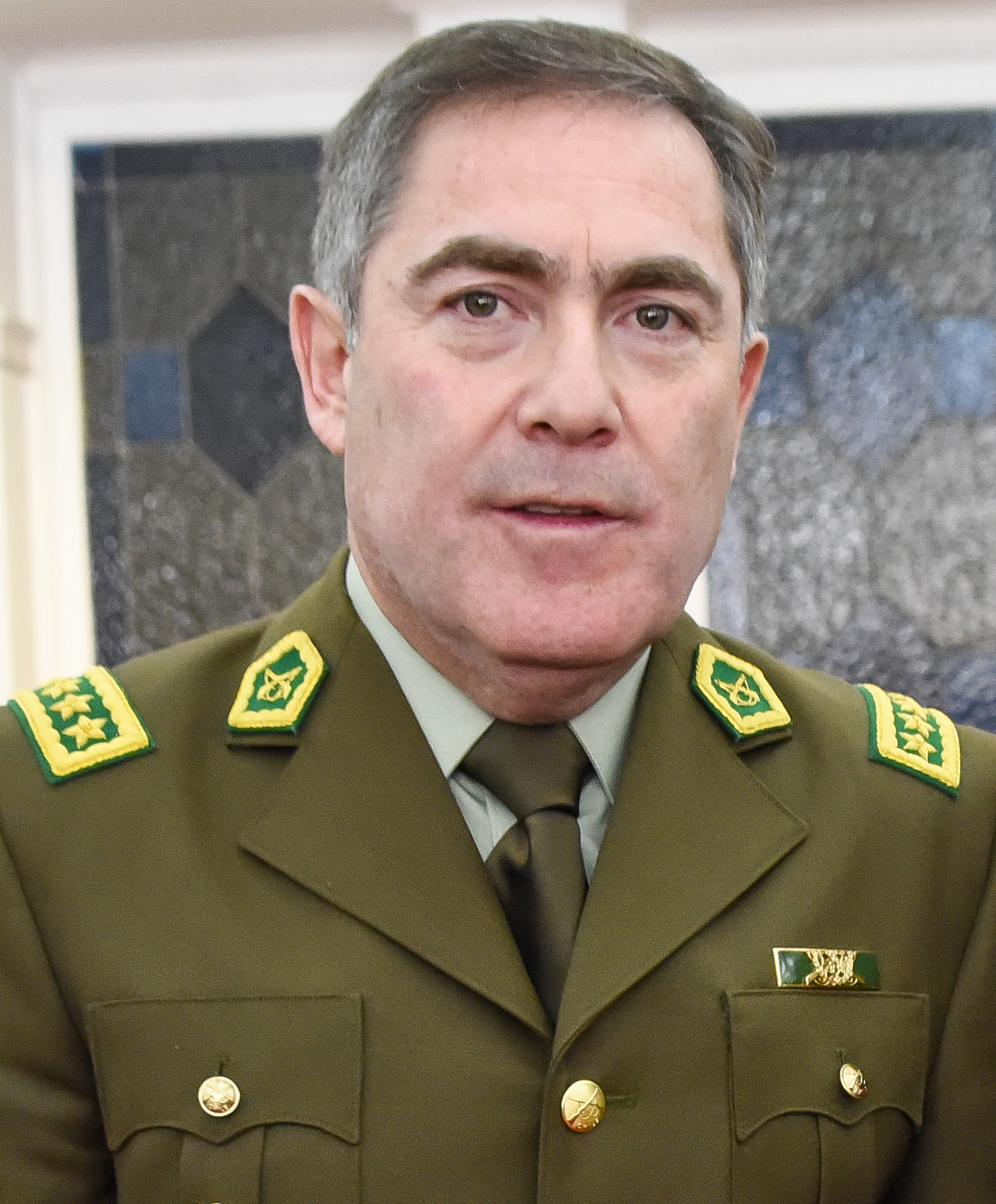

Hermes Soto Chilean former police officer. He served general director of Carabineros de Chile in 2018.
