= Carabineros de Chile School =

Police School in Chile

Carabineros School "General Carlos Ibáñez del Campo"
- Escuela de Carabineros "General Carlos Ibáñez del Campo"
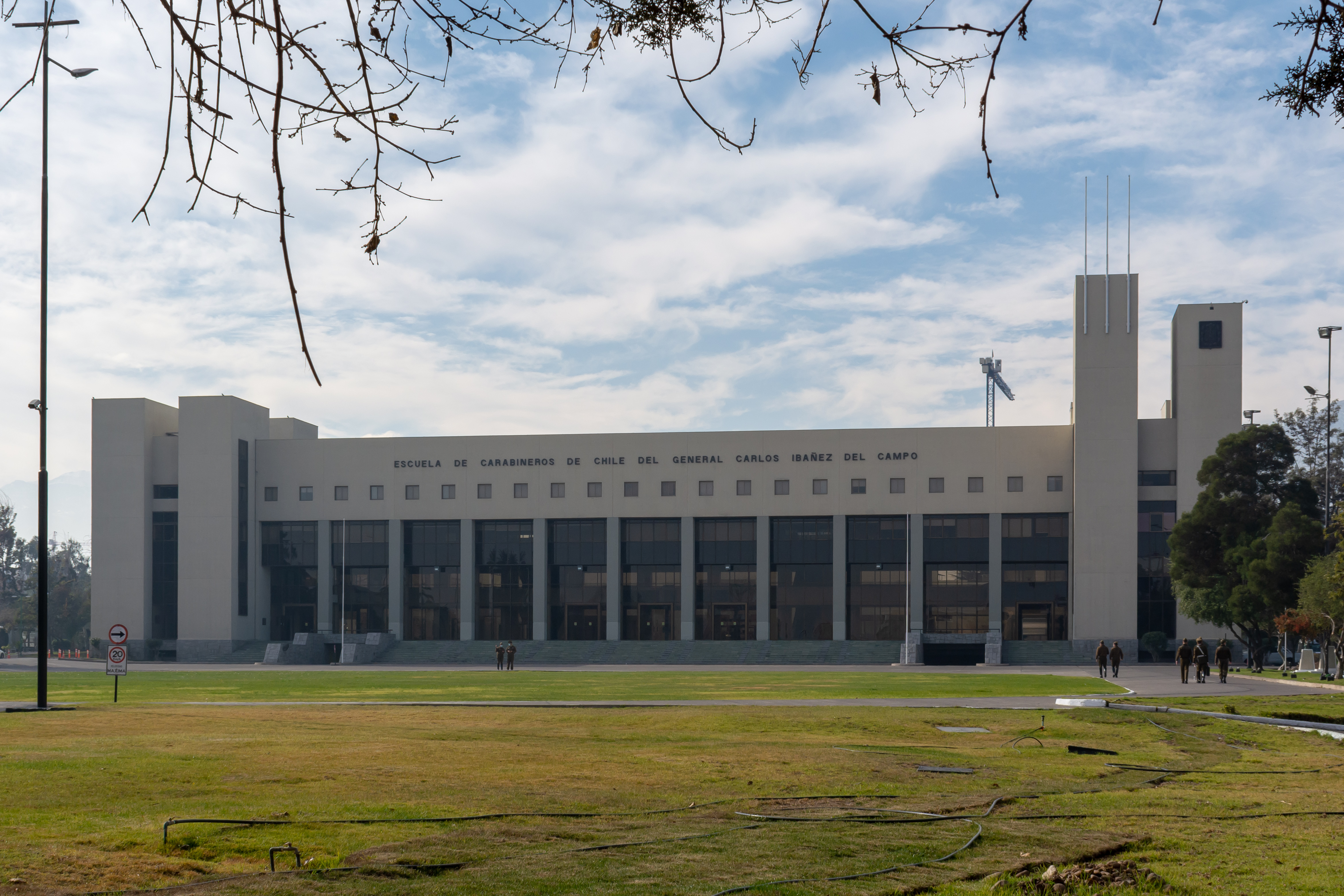
- Carabineros School
- Active: 19 December 1908 – present
- Country: Chile
- Allegiance: Carabineros de Chile
- Branch: Carabineros de Chile
- Type: Higher Education Institution of the Forces of Order and Security
- Role: Officer training
- Headquarters: Providencia, Santiago, Chile
- March: Himno de la Escuela de Carabineros
- Anniversaries: 19 December
- Website: www.escuelacarabineros.cl

Commanders
- Current commander: Colonel Cristian Acevedo Yáñez

The Carabineros School "General Carlos Ibáñez del Campo" is a higher education, police and military institution. Its primary mission is the design, development, and implementation of the initial educational training process for Officers of the institution.

== History ==
The Carabineros School was created by Supreme Decree on December 19, 1908, thanks to the efforts of Commander Roberto Dávila Baeza, under the name "School of Army Carabineros" (Escuela de Carabineros del Ejército). Its mission was to train Non-Commissioned Officers, Corporals, and Troops of the "Cuerpo de Carabineros", a group of regiments and cavalry squadrons of the Chilean Army under the command of the Ministry of the Interior, mainly dedicated to securing roads, railways, and rural areas. The corps gradually gained prestige and autonomy. The following year, a course for Officer Candidates was created.

Eleven years later, in 1919, the first Organic Law of the Carabineros Corps was enacted. It defined the corps as "a military institution tasked with maintaining order throughout the territory of the Republic, particularly in the countryside and public roads", dependent on the Ministry of the Interior and henceforth independent from the Army.

Its first director was Cavalry Major Francisco Flores Ruiz, who also wrote the lyrics of the Carabineros of Chile Anthem and was the father of composer Francisco Flores del Campo.

Following the merger of the Carabineros Corps (military) with the fiscal and municipal police (civil), which gave rise to Carabineros de Chile, the school became responsible for training and advancing the officers of the new institution.

In 1968, through Law No. 16.811 of the Republic, approved by the Senate on April 10, the name was officially changed to Carabineros School of General Carlos Ibáñez del Campo, in memory of the two-time President of the Republic and founder of the institution, General Carlos Ibáñez del Campo, who also served as the school's director during the 1920s while holding the rank of Major of Cavalry.

== Academic training ==
Students at the school receive the rank of "Aspirant to Officer", different from the Cadets of the Chilean Armed Forces.

The school trains both Officers of Public Order and Security (Administrator of Public Security) and Officers of Logistics and Finance (Administrator of Public Accounting and Finance).

The Officer training program lasts eight academic semesters. The first six are conducted in boarding school mode, during which students—while holding the rank of Officer Aspirant—receive instruction in various academic areas, including Institutional, Legal, Psychosocial-Communicational, and Physical-Sports fundamentals.

Upon completing the eighth semester, students graduate with the rank of Second Lieutenant of Carabineros and begin a non-residential period, which includes Professional Practice in Carabineros Operational Units and completion of a thesis to obtain an academic degree.

== Institutional career ==
The following table outlines the career path of Aspirants and Officers of Carabineros de Chile during their military career:

Years of study	Grade	Rank
1st – 4th year at the School	Officer Aspirant	-

Years of service	Grade	Rank
5th – 7th year	Second Lieutenant	Junior Officer
8th – 10th year	Lieutenant	Junior Officer
11th – 18th year	Captain	Junior Officer
19th – 24th year	Major	Senior Officer
22nd – 25th year	Lieutenant Colonel	Senior Officer
26th – 30th year	Colonel	Senior Officer
---	General	General Officer
---	Inspector General	General Officer
---	General Director	General Officer

== Location ==
The Carabineros School has a modern campus located at 1842 Antonio Varas Avenue, in the Providencia district of Santiago. It occupies a 13.57-hectare site, the same on which it was originally founded.
