= List of universities in Chile =

Location of Chile

This is a list of universities and other higher education institutions in Chile, namely Professional Institutes (IP) and Technical Training Centers (CFT).

== Universities ==
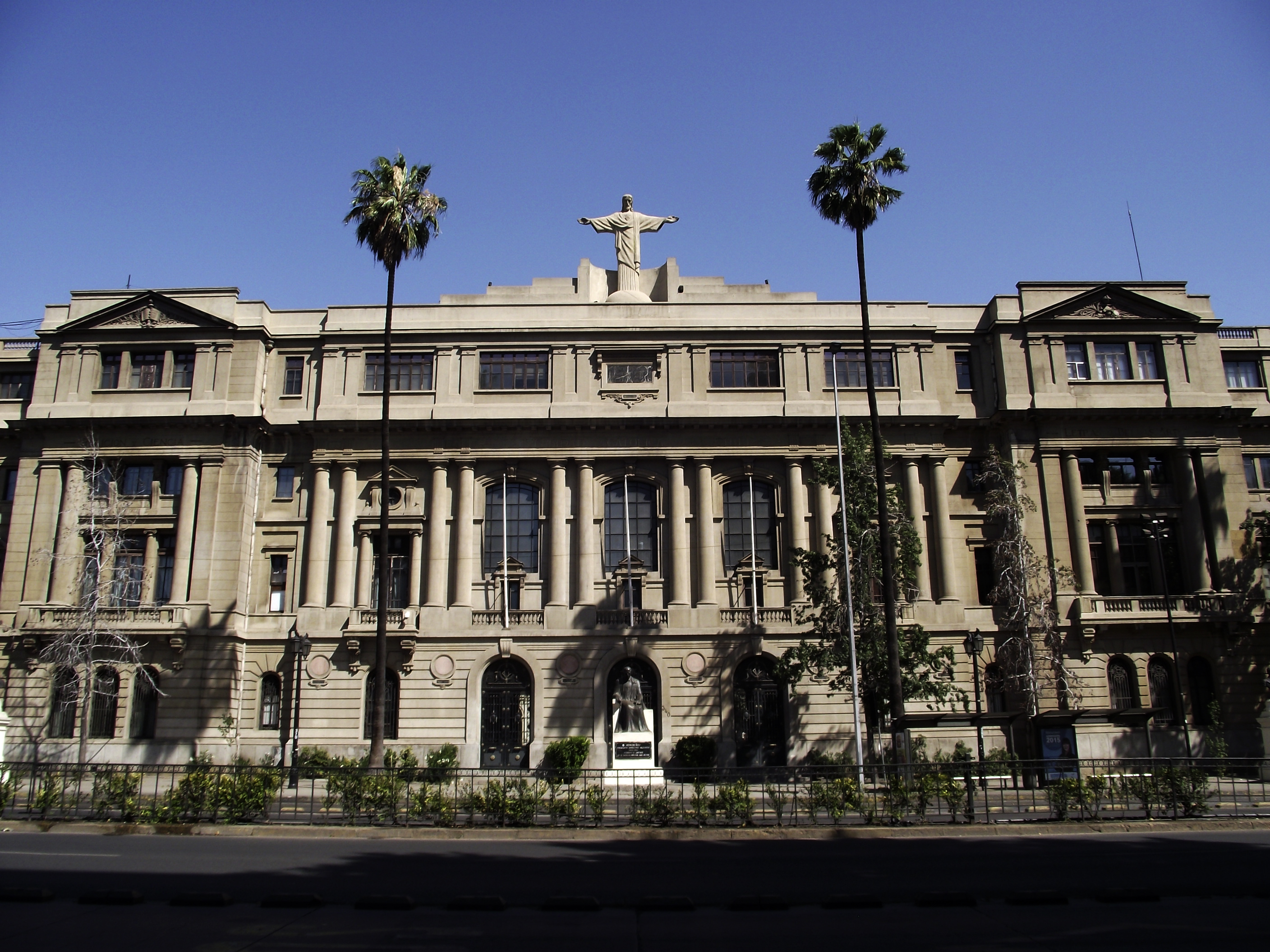
Pontificial Catholic University of Chile

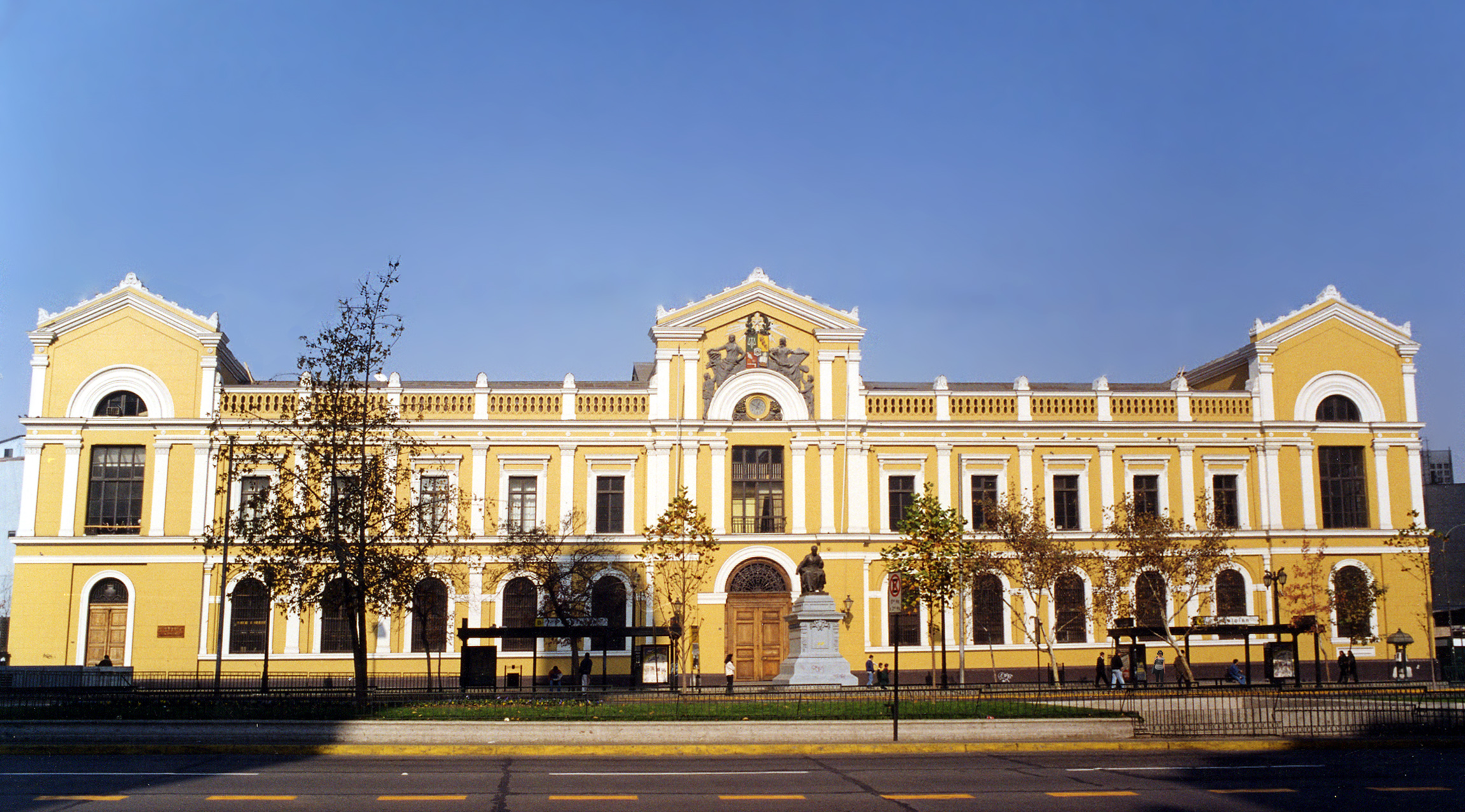
University of Chile

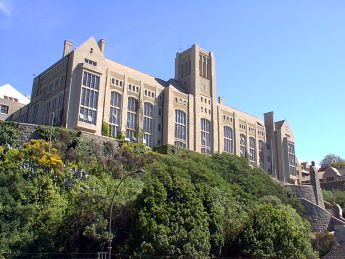
Federico Santa Maria Technical University

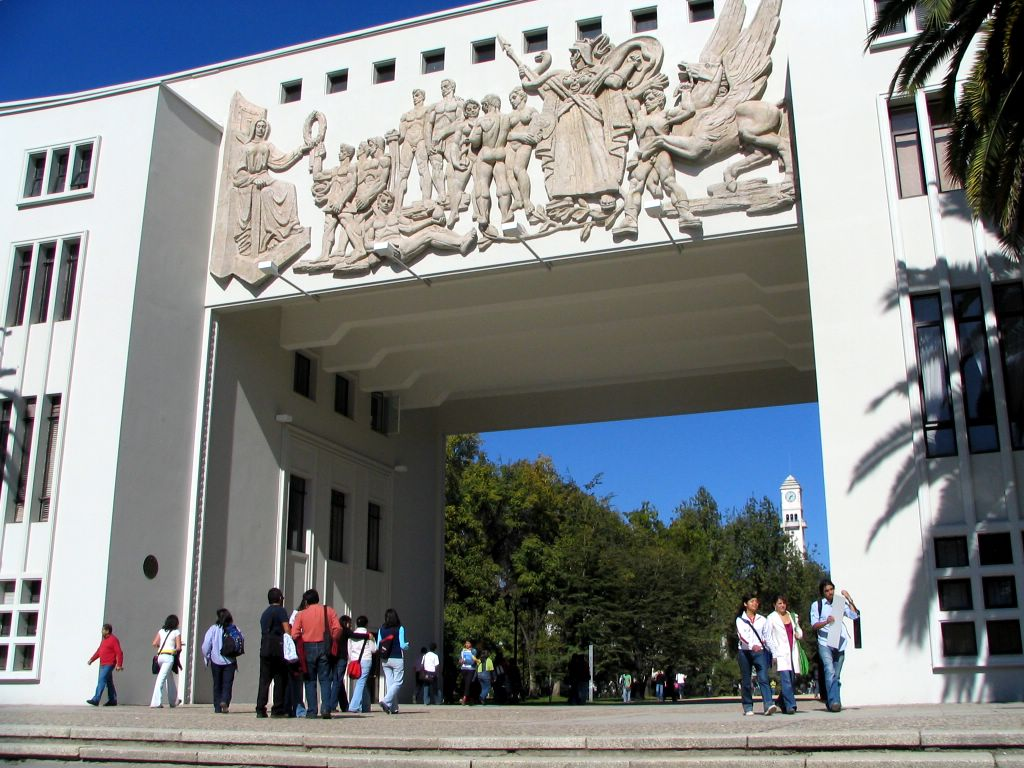
University of Concepcion

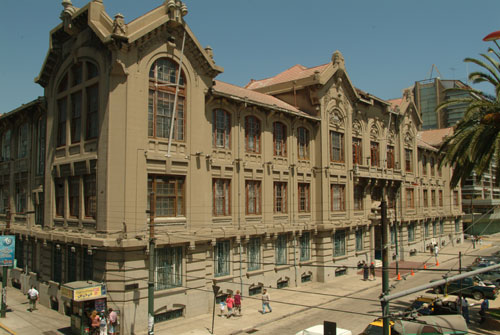
Pontificial Catholic University of Valparaiso

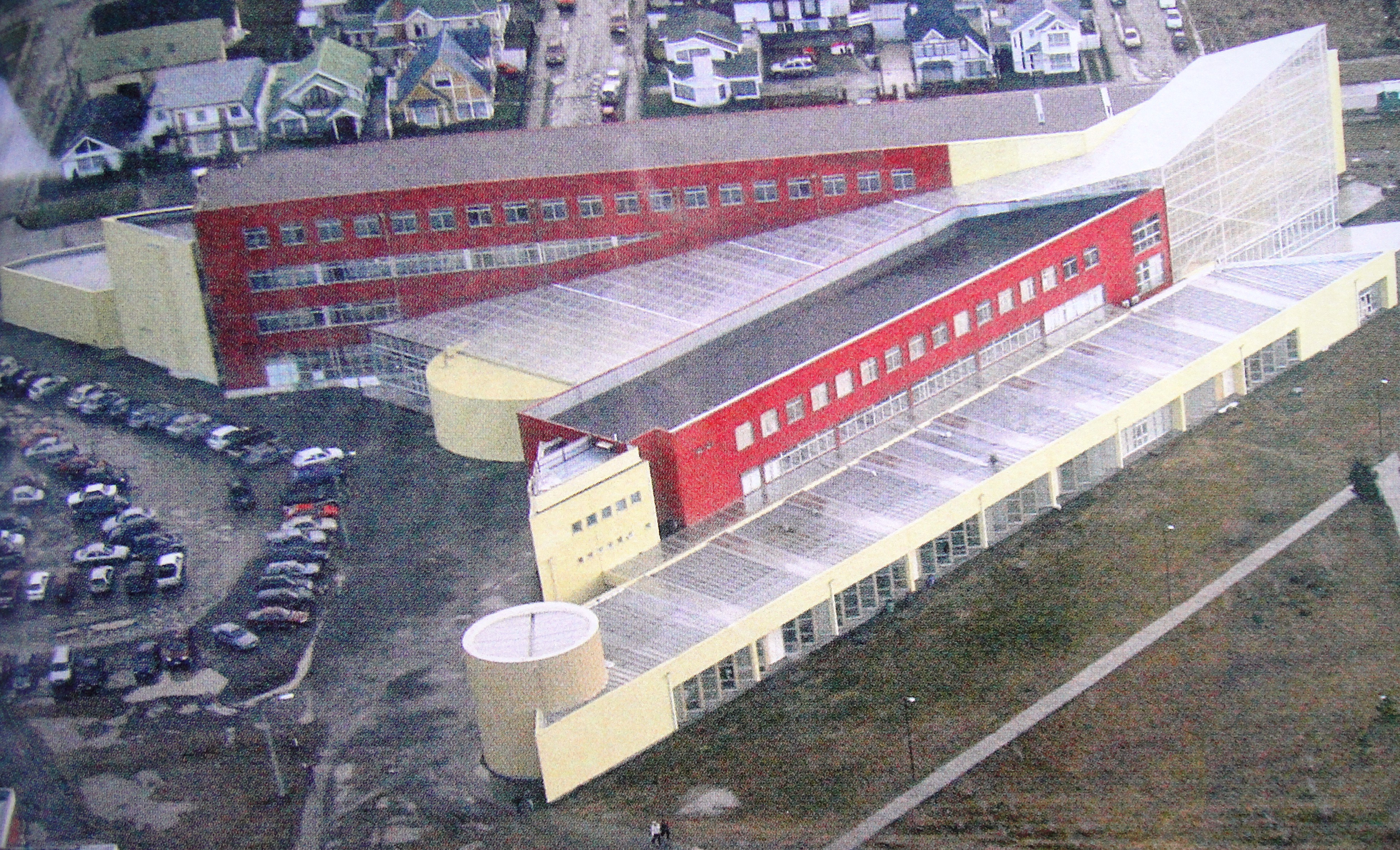
University of Magallanes

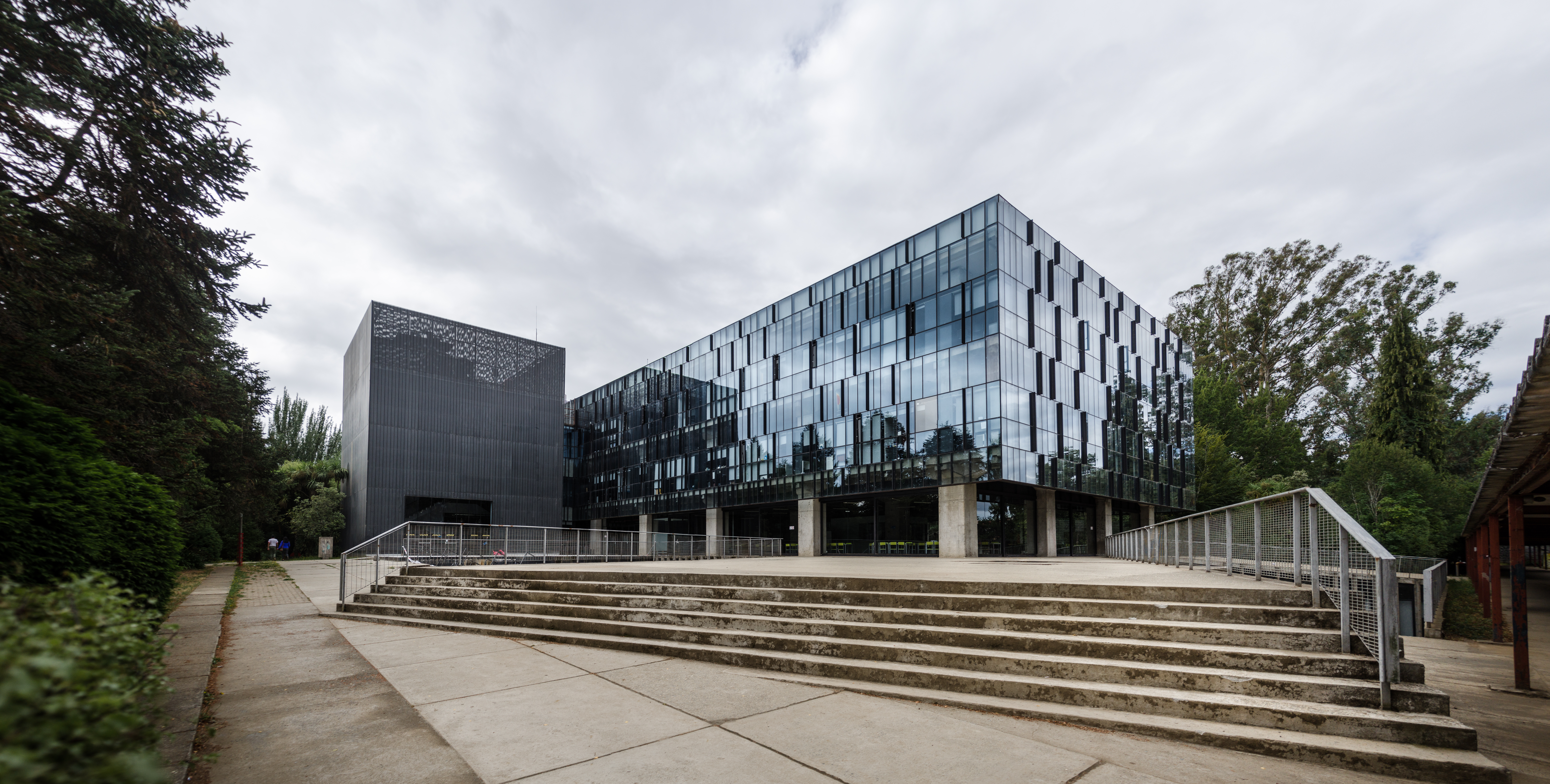
Austral University of Chile

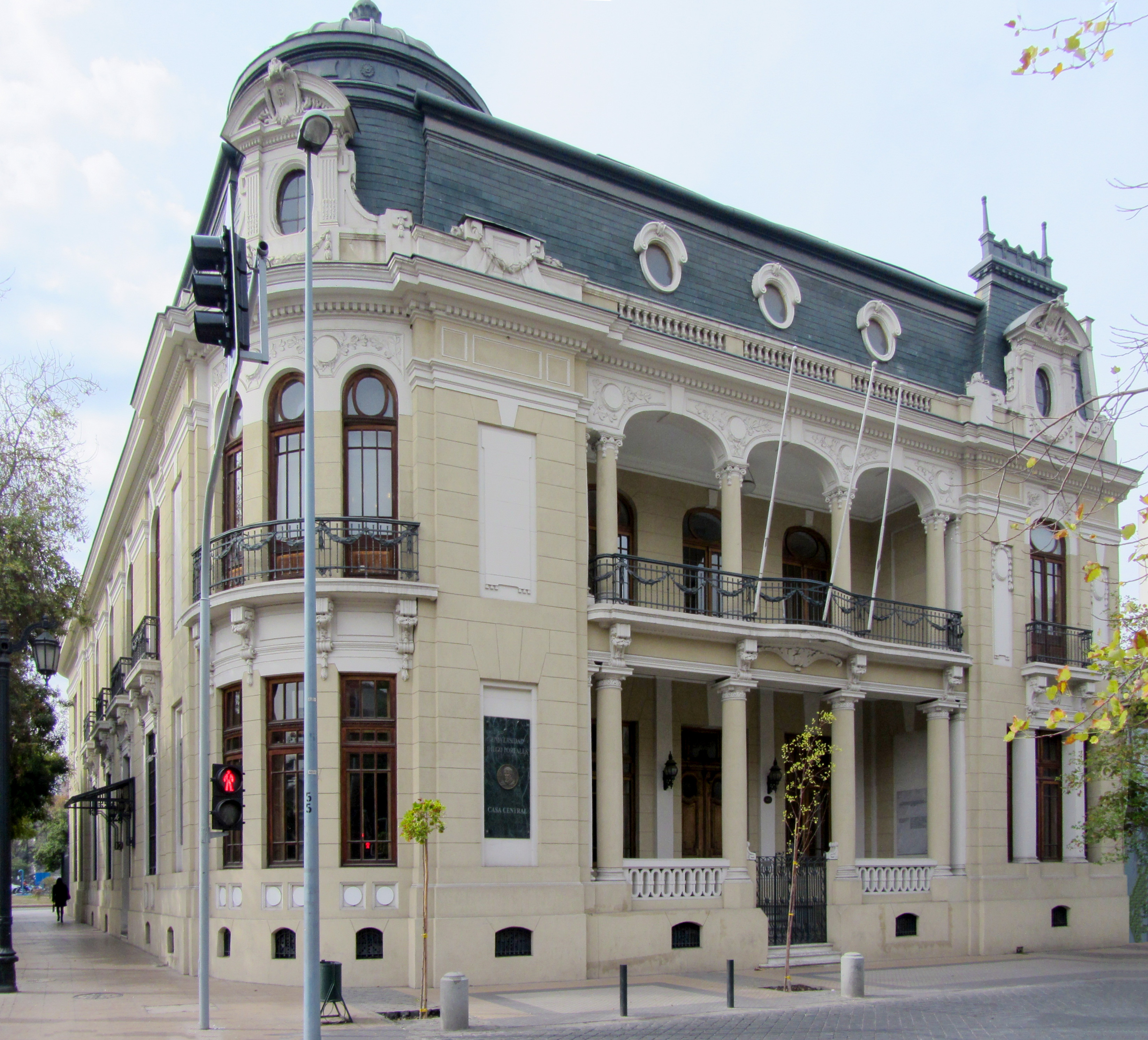
Diego Portales University

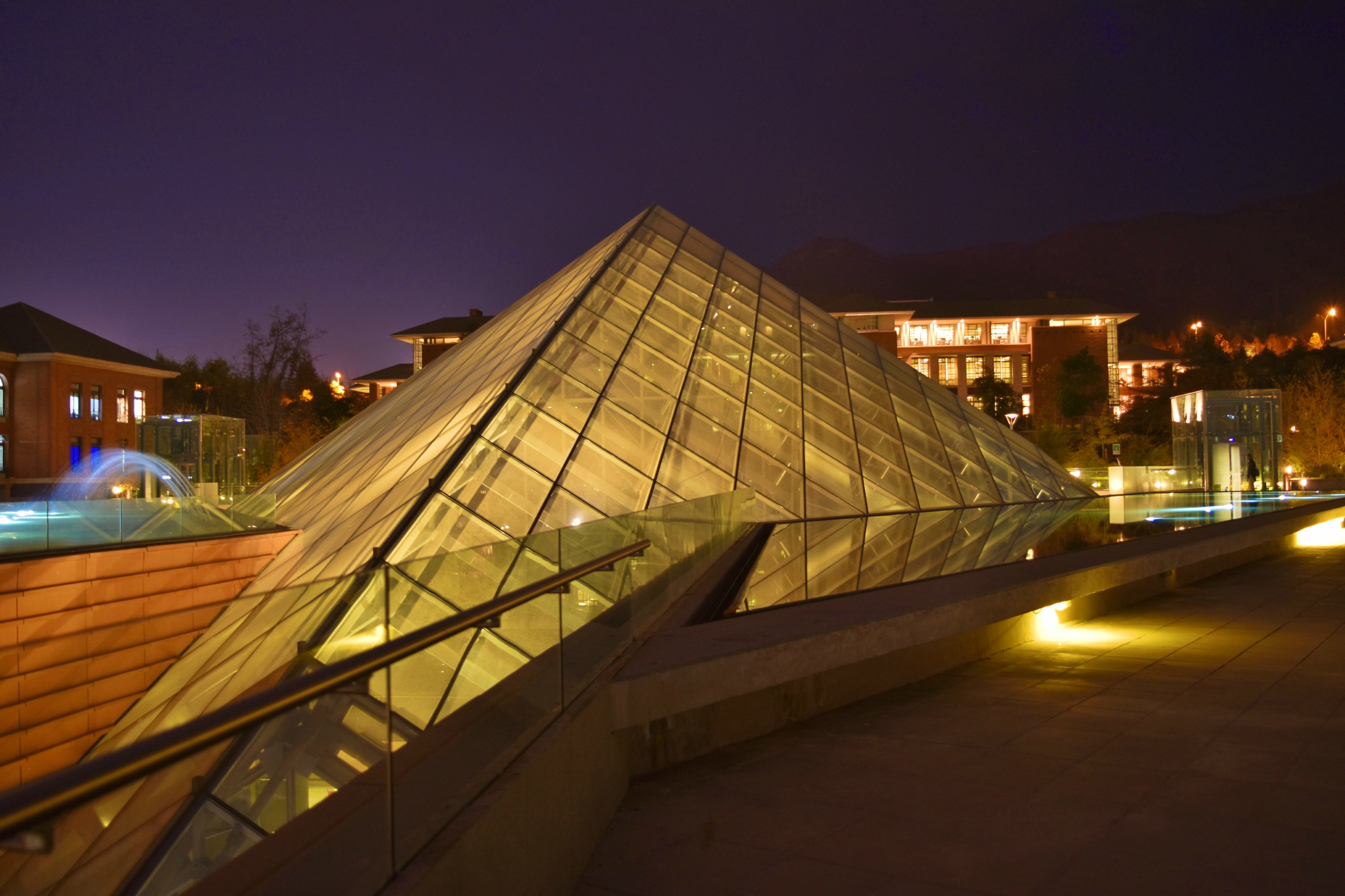
University of the Andes

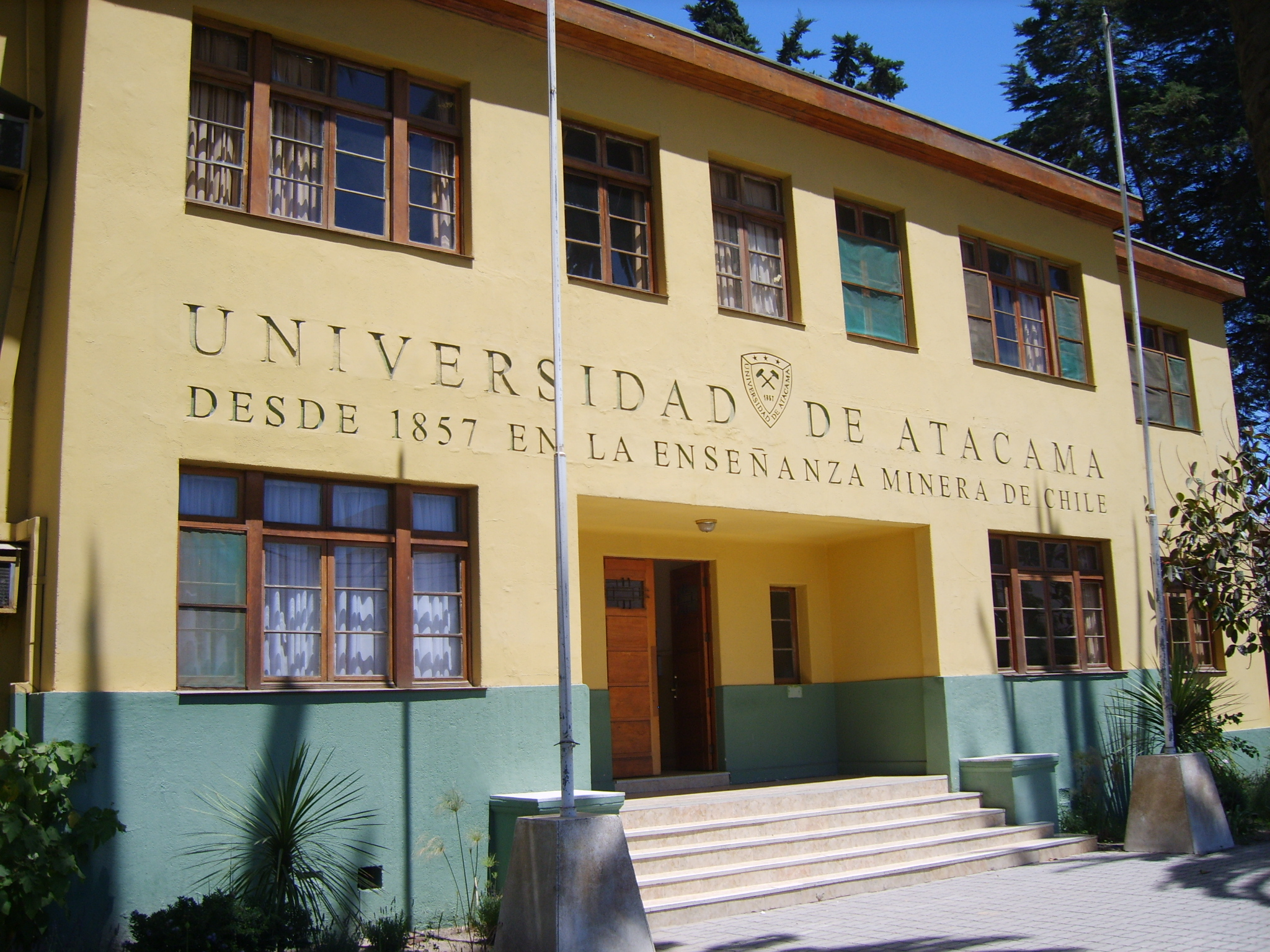
University of Atacama

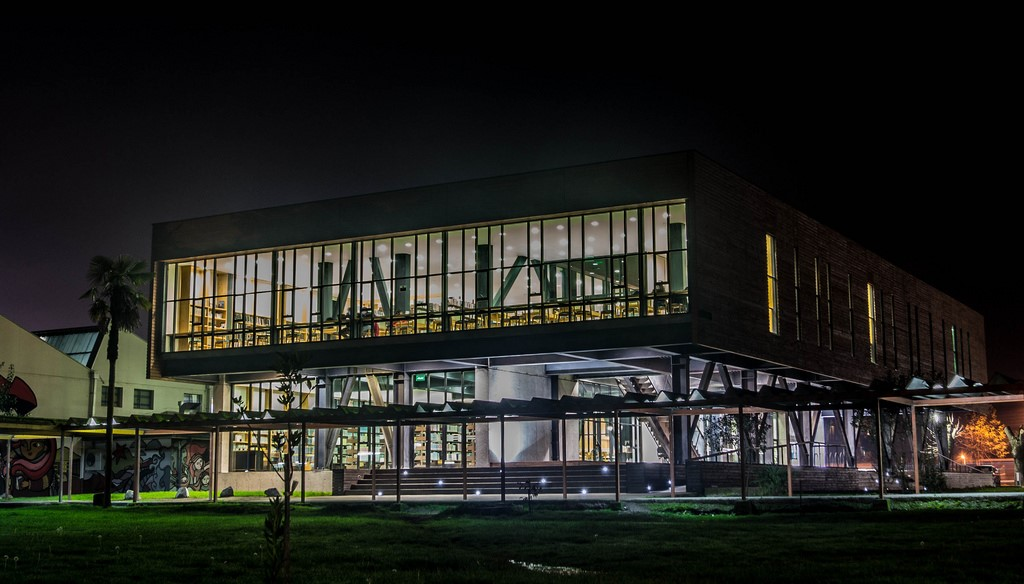
University of Bío-Bío

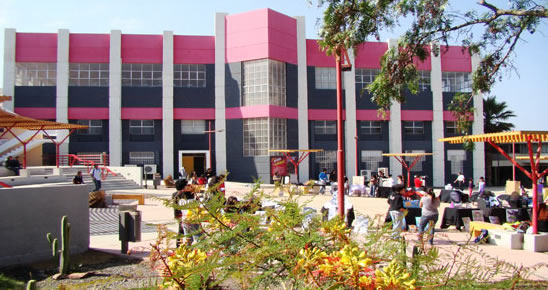
University of Antofagasta

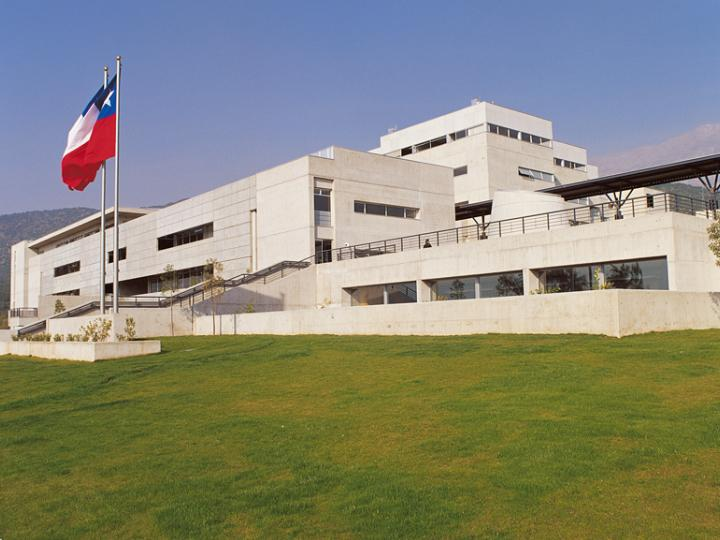
Universidad del Desarrollo

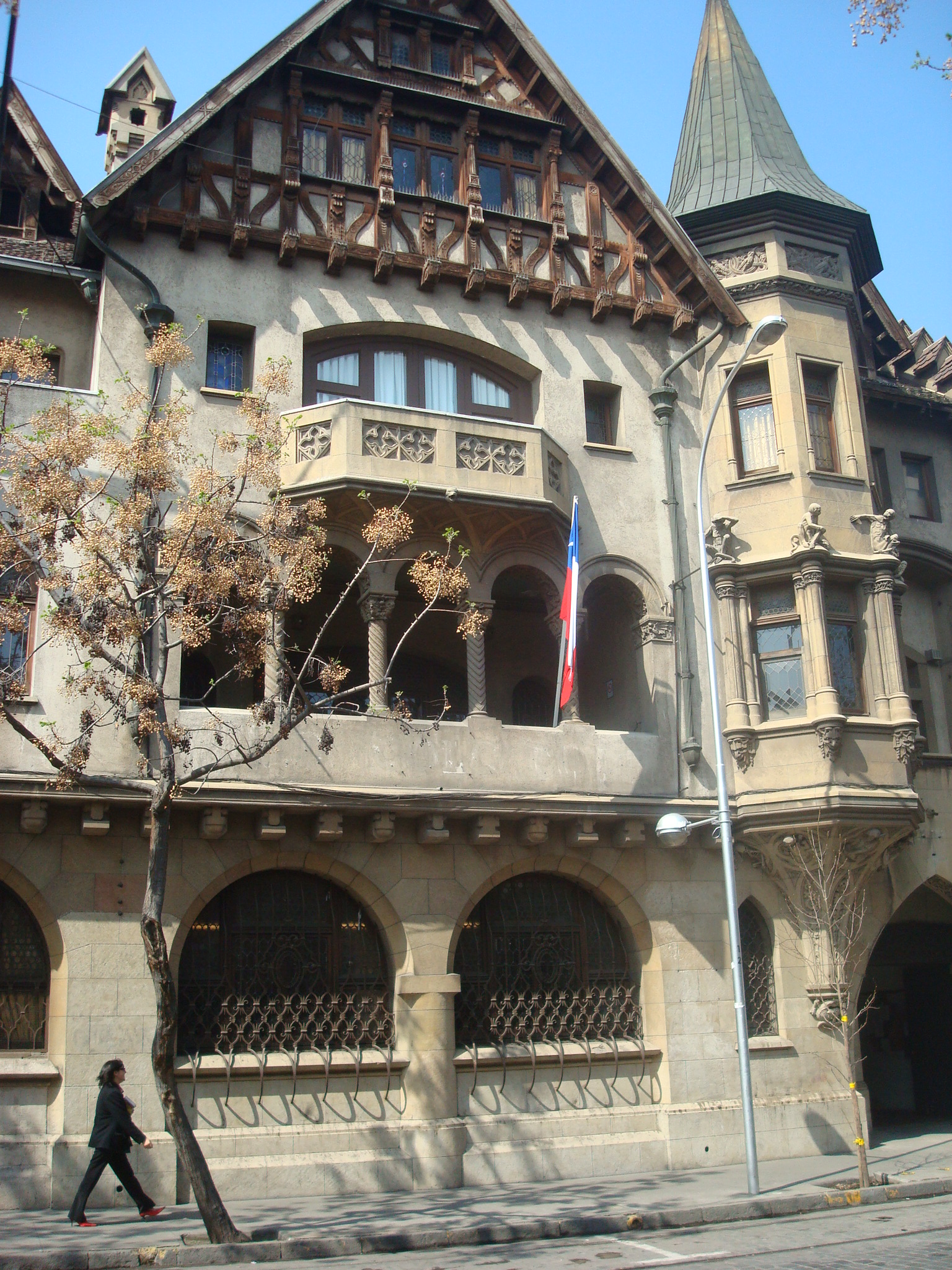
Alberto Hurtado University

In the Chilean higher education system, there are 61 universities, with over 750.000 students. Of these, 46 are accredited by the Chilean National Accreditation Commission, representing 94% of the total student registration.

Universities founded before 1981, or which can be traced before that year, are known as Traditional Universities. Two Universities, Universidad de O'Higgins and Universidad de Aysén, are two public universities created in 2015, receiving their first students in 2017.

Institution	Foundation	Type	Ownership	Cities (headquarters in bold)	Enrollment (2014)
Universidad de Chile	1842	Traditional university	Public	Santiago	37,521
Universidad de Santiago de Chile	1981/ 1849 (Note: Year of the foundation of the School of crafts, "Escuela de Artes y Oficios (EAO).)	Traditional university	Public	Santiago	23,895
Universidad de Valparaíso	1981	Traditional university	Public	San Felipe, Santiago, **Valparaíso**	15,814
Universidad Arturo Prat	1984	Traditional university	Public	Antofagasta, Arica, Calama, Copiapó, **Iquique**, Santiago, Victoria, Villarrica	14,207
Universidad del Bío-Bío	1947	Traditional university	Public	Chillán, **Concepción**	12,614
Universidad de Talca	1981	Traditional university	Public	Curicó, Linares, Santa Cruz, Santiago, **Talca**	10,523
Universidad de Tarapacá	1981	Traditional university	Public	**Arica**, Iquique	9,809
Universidad de La Frontera	1981	Traditional university	Public	Pucón, **Temuco**	9,790
Universidad de Los Lagos	1993	Traditional university	Public	Ancud, Castro, **Osorno**, Puerto Montt, Santiago	9,707
Universidad de Playa Ancha de Ciencias de la Educación	1948	Traditional university	Public	San Felipe, **Valparaíso**	8,164
Universidad de Antofagasta	1981	Traditional university	Public	Antofagasta	7,900
Universidad de La Serena	1981	Traditional university	Public	**La Serena**, Ovalle	7,245
Universidad Tecnológica Metropolitana	1993	Traditional university	Public	San Fernando, **Santiago**	7,139
Universidad de Atacama	1981 / 1857 (Note: Year of the foundation of the School of Mining of Copiapo.)	Traditional university	Public	**Copiapó**, Vallenar	5,397
Universidad Metropolitana de Ciencias de la Educación	1889	Traditional university	Public	Graneros, **Santiago**	4,791
Universidad de Magallanes	1961	Traditional university	Public	Coihaique, Porvenir, Puerto Natales, **Punta Arenas**	4,049
Pontificia Universidad Católica de Chile	1888	Traditional university	Private	**Santiago**, Villarrica	29,485
Universidad de Concepción	1919	Traditional university	Private	Chillán, **Concepción**, Los Ángeles	26,399
Universidad Técnica Federico Santa María	1926	Traditional university	Private	Hualpén, Rancagua, Santiago, **Valparaíso**, Viña del Mar	19,669
Pontificia Universidad Católica de Valparaíso	1928	Traditional university	Private	Valparaíso	14,573
Universidad Austral de Chile	1954	Traditional university	Private	Coihaique, Puerto Montt, **Valdivia**	13,588
Universidad Católica de la Santísima Concepción	1991	Traditional university	Private	Cañete, Chillán, **Concepción**, Los Ángeles, Talcahuano	13,317
Universidad Católica del Norte	1956	Traditional university	Private	**Antofagasta**, Coquimbo	10,976
Universidad Católica de Temuco	1991	Traditional university	Private	Temuco	9,446
Universidad Católica del Maule	1991	Traditional university	Private	Curicó, **Talca**	7,531
Universidad de O'Higgins	2015	University	Public	**Rancagua**, San Fernando	
Universidad de Aysén	2015	University	Public	**Coyhaique**	
Universidad Andrés Bello	1988	University	Private	Concepción, Rancagua, **Santiago**, Viña del Mar	48,255
Universidad Tecnológica de Chile Inacap	1966	University	Private	Antofagasta, Arica, Calama, Chillán, Copiapó, Coihaique, Curicó, Iquique, La Serena, Los Ángeles, Osorno, Puerto Montt, Punta Arenas, Rancagua, **Santiago**, Talca, Talcahuano, Temuco, Valdivia, Valparaíso	34,227
Universidad de Las Américas	1988	University	Private	Concepción, **Santiago**, Viña del Mar	30,026
Universidad Santo Tomás	1988	University	Private	Antofagasta, Arica, Concepción, Copiapó, Iquique, La Serena, Los Ángeles, Osorno, Puerto Montt, **Santiago**, Talca, Temuco, Valdivia, Viña del Mar	29,596
Universidad San Sebastián	1989	University	Private	Concepción, Osorno, Puerto Montt, **Santiago**, Valdivia	27,493
Universidad Mayor	1988	University	Private	**Santiago**, Temuco	21,321
Universidad Autónoma de Chile	1989	University	Private	Santiago, Talca, **Temuco**	20,539
Universidad Diego Portales	1982	University	Private	Santiago	17,937
Universidad del Desarrollo	1990	University	Private	**Concepción**, Santiago, Valdivia	17,162
Universidad Central de Chile	1982	University	Private	Antofagasta, La Serena, **Santiago**	13,306
Universidad Adolfo Ibáñez	1953	University	Private	**Santiago**, Viña del Mar	10,657
Universidad de Aconcagua		University	Private	Ancud, Calama, Chillán, Concepción, Illapel, La Ligua, La Serena, Linares, Los Andes, Machalí, Puerto Montt, Rancagua, San Antonio, San Felipe, Santiago, Temuco, Tocopilla, Valdivia, Vallenar, **Viña del Mar**	9,790
Universidad de Los Andes	1989	University	Private	Santiago	8,603
Universidad de Viña del Mar	1988	University	Private	San Felipe, **Viña del Mar**	8,216
Universidad Pedro de Valdivia		University	Private	Antofagasta, Chillán, Concepción, La Serena, **Santiago**	8,172
Universidad Alberto Hurtado		University	Private	Santiago	6,938
Universidad del Pacífico		University	Private	Santiago	6,546
Universidad Finis Terrae		University	Private	Santiago	6,514
Universidad Católica Silva Henríquez		University	Private	Santiago	5,557
Universidad Bolivariana		University	Private	Cauquenes, Chillán, Concepción, Iquique, La Serena, Linares, Los Ángeles, Ovalle, Parral, **Santiago**, Talca	4,893
Universidad Bernardo O'Higgins		University	Private	Santiago	4,608
Universidad Sek		University	Private	Santiago	4,380
Universidad La República		University	Private	Antofagasta, Arica, Calama, Chillán, Concepción, Coquimbo, Illapel, Los Ángeles, Rancagua, San Fernando, **Santiago**, Talca	4,233
Universidad de Artes, Ciencias y Comunicacion - Uniacc		University	Private	Santiago	3,831
Universidad Ucinf		University	Private	Santiago	3,707
Universidad Academia de Humanismo Cristiano	1975	University	Private	Santiago	3,476
Universidad Iberoamericana de Ciencias y Tecnología, Unicyt		University	Private	Santiago	3,429
Universidad de Arte y Ciencias Sociales Arcis		University	Private	Castro, Concepción, **Santiago**, Valparaíso	3,357
Universidad Los Leones		University	Private	Santiago	1,945
Universidad Miguel de Cervantes	1996	University	Private	Santiago	1,891
Universidad Adventista de Chile		University	Private	Chillán	1,878
Universidad Gabriela Mistral	1981	University	Private	Puerto Varas, **Santiago**	1,690
Universidad del Mar	1989 - 2019	University	Private	Antofagasta, Arica, Calama, Iquique, La Serena, Quillota, San Fernando, Santiago, Talca, Temuco, **Viña del Mar**	1,469
Universidad Chileno Británica de Cultura		University	Private	Santiago	428
Universidad La Araucana		University	Private	Santiago	235

== Professional Institutes ==
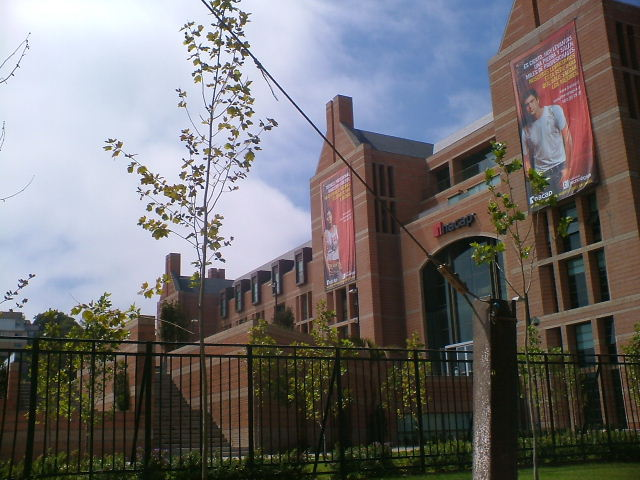
IP Inacap

Institution	Foundation	Type	Ownership	Cities (headquarters in bold)	Enrollment (2014)
IP Aiep		Professional institute	Private	Antofagasta, Calama, Concepción, Curicó, La Serena, Los Ángeles, Osorno, Puerto Montt, Rancagua, San Felipe, San Fernando, Santiago, Talca, Temuco, Valparaíso, Viña del Mar	84,675
IP Duoc UC	1968	Professional institute	Private	Concepción, Santiago, Valparaíso, Viña del Mar	80,141
IP Inacap		Professional institute	Private	Antofagasta, Arica, Calama, Chillán, Copiapó, Coihaique, Curicó, Iquique, La Serena, Los Ángeles, Osorno, Puerto Montt, Punta Arenas, Rancagua, Santiago, Talca, Talcahuano, Temuco, Valdivia, Valparaíso	36,058
IP de Chile		Professional institute	Private	La Serena, Rancagua, Santiago, Temuco	23,776
IP Santo Tomás		Professional institute	Private	Antofagasta, Arica, Chillán, Concepción, Copiapó, Curicó, Iquique, La Serena, Los Ángeles, Osorno, Ovalle, Puerto Montt, Punta Arenas, Rancagua, Santiago, Talca, Temuco, Valdivia, Viña del Mar	21,313
IP La Araucana		Professional institute	Private	Castro, Concepción, Curicó, La Serena, Los Ángeles, Osorno, Puerto Montt, San Antonio, Santiago, Temuco, Viña del Mar	17,387
IP Los Leones		Professional institute	Private	Santiago, Viña del Mar	13,966
IP Latinoamericano de Comercio Exterior		Professional institute	Private	Copiapó, Punta Arenas, Santiago, Talca, Valparaíso	12,067
IP Dr. Virginio Gómez G.		Professional institute	Private	Chillán, Concepción, Los Ángeles	10,146
IP del Valle Central		Professional institute	Private	Antofagasta, Chillán, Concepción, Constitución, Curicó, La Serena, Los Ángeles, Ovalle, Puerto Montt, Santiago, Talca	9,639
IP Providencia		Professional institute	Private	Concepción, La Serena, Santiago, Temuco, Viña del Mar	7,615
IP Los Lagos		Professional institute	Private	Antofagasta, Calama, Concepción, Coihaique, Los Ángeles, Quillota, Rancagua, San Antonio, San Fernando, Santiago, Talca, Temuco, Valdivia, Valparaíso	7,261
IP Instituto Superior de Artes y Ciencias de la Comunicación		Professional institute	Private	Santiago	5,205
IP Diego Portales		Professional institute	Private	Chillán, Concepción, Santiago, Viña del Mar	4,482
IP Instituto Profesional IPG		Professional institute	Private	Arauco, Concepción, Panguipulli, Rancagua	4,211
IP Instituto de Estudios Bancarios Guillermo Subercaseaux		Professional institute	Private	Concepción, Rancagua, Santiago, Temuco, Viña del Mar	3,301
IP Esucomex		Professional institute	Private	Santiago	2,849
IP de Arte y Comunicación Arcos		Professional institute	Private	Santiago, Viña del Mar	1,779
IP Escuela de Contadores Auditores de Santiago		Professional institute	Private	Santiago	1,653
IP Carlos Casanueva		Professional institute	Private	Santiago	1,219
IP Ciisa		Professional institute	Private	Santiago	1,180
IP Instituto Internacional de Artes Culinarias y Servicios		Professional institute	Private	Santiago, Viña del Mar	875
IP Instituto Nacional del Fútbol		Professional institute	Private	Santiago	818
IP de Los Ángeles		Professional institute	Private	Los Ángeles	798
IP Eatri Instituto Profesional		Professional institute	Private	Santiago	739
IP Libertador de Los Andes		Professional institute	Private	Los Andes	684
IP Escuela Moderna de Música		Professional institute	Private	Santiago, Viña del Mar	676
IP Instituto Profesional del Comercio		Professional institute	Private	Chillán, Santiago	545
IP Chileno-Británico de Cultura		Professional institute	Private	Santiago	415
IP Projazz		Professional institute	Private	Santiago	383
IP Chileno Norteamericano		Professional institute	Private	Santiago	355
IP Agrario Adolfo Matthei		Professional institute	Private	Osorno	279
IP Hogar Catequístico		Professional institute	Private	Puerto Montt, Rancagua, Santiago	257
IP de Ciencias y Educación Helen Keller		Professional institute	Private	Valparaíso	254
IP Vertical		Professional institute	Private	Santiago	141
IP de Ciencias y Artes Incacea		Professional institute	Private	Santiago	119
IP de Ciencias de la Computación Acuario Data		Professional institute	Private	Santiago	105
IP Escuela de Cine de Chile		Professional institute	Private	Santiago	103
IP Alemán Wilhelm Von Humboldt		Professional institute	Private	Santiago	48
IP Adventista		Professional institute	Private	Chillán	39
IP de Artes Escénicas Karen Connolly		Professional institute	Private	Santiago	18
IP Mar Futuro		Professional institute	Private	Valparaíso	11

== Technical Training Centers ==
Institution	Foundation	Type	Ownership	Cities (headquarters in bold)	Enrollment (2014)
CFT Inacap		Technical schooling center	Private	Antofagasta, Arica, Calama, Chillán, Copiapó, Coihaique, Curicó, Iquique, La Serena, Los Ángeles, Osorno, Puerto Montt, Punta Arenas, Rancagua, Santiago, Talca, Talcahuano, Temuco, Valdivia, Valparaíso	50,159
CFT Santo Tomás		Technical schooling center	Private	Antofagasta, Arica, Chillán, Concepción, Copiapó, Curicó, Iquique, La Serena, Los Ángeles, Osorno, Ovalle, Puerto Montt, Punta Arenas, Rancagua, Santiago, Talca, Temuco, Valdivia, Viña del Mar	35,970
CFT Duoc UC		Technical schooling center	Private	Santiago	7,842
CFT Icel		Technical schooling center	Private	Santiago	6,278
CFT Instituto Tecnológico de Chile - I.T.C.		Technical schooling center	Private	Santiago	4,245
CFT de Enac		Technical schooling center	Private	Santiago	3,108
CFT San Agustín de Talca		Technical schooling center	Private	Cauquenes, Linares, Talca	3,043
CFT Proandes		Technical schooling center	Private	La Ligua, Los Andes, San Felipe, Santiago, Talcahuano	2,468
CFT La Araucana		Technical schooling center	Private	San Antonio	2,246
CFT Ceduc - UCN		Technical schooling center	Private	Antofagasta, Coquimbo, Lebu	2,236
CFT Simón Bolívar		Technical schooling center	Private	Santiago	2,234
CFT de Tarapacá		Technical schooling center	Private	Arica, Iquique	2,060
CFT Cámara de Comercio de Santiago		Technical schooling center	Private	Santiago	1,963
CFT Andrés Bello		Technical schooling center	Private	Angol, Temuco	1,926
CFT Lota-Arauco		Technical schooling center	Private	Cañete, Lota	1,782
CFT del Medio Ambiente		Technical schooling center	Private	Santiago	1,651
CFT Los Lagos		Technical schooling center	Private	Antofagasta, Calama, Concepción, Coihaique, Los Ángeles, Quillota, Rancagua, San Antonio, San Fernando, Talca, Temuco, Valdivia, Valparaíso	1,431
CFT Manpower		Technical schooling center	Private	Concepción, Santiago	1,379
CFT Instituto Superior de Estudios Jurídicos Canon		Technical schooling center	Private	Curarrehue, Futrono, La Unión, Lanco, Los Vilos, Máfil, Mariquina, Nueva Imperial, Paillaco, Saavedra, Santiago, Vilcún, Villarrica	1,327
CFT Ucevalpo		Technical schooling center	Private	La Calera, Valparaíso, Viña del Mar	1,224
CFT Juan Bohon		Technical schooling center	Private	La Serena	1,138
CFT Uda		Technical schooling center	Private	Copiapó, Vallenar	957
CFT Magnos		Technical schooling center	Private	Santiago, Temuco	867
CFT U.Valpo.		Technical schooling center	Private	Viña del Mar	866
CFT Teodoro Wickel Kluwen		Technical schooling center	Private	Angol, Temuco	816
CFT Iprosec		Technical schooling center	Private	Osorno	799
CFT Los Leones		Technical schooling center	Private	Santiago	766
CFT Massachusetts		Technical schooling center	Private	Linares, Talca	692
CFT Prodata		Technical schooling center	Private	Copiapó, La Calera, Osorno, Santa Cruz, Vallenar, Valparaíso	666
CFT Educap		Technical schooling center	Private	Quillota	664
CFT Instituto Central de Capacitación Educacional ICCE		Technical schooling center	Private	Casablanca, La Serena, Los Andes, Punta Arenas, San Antonio, Santiago, Talca, Viña del Mar	563
CFT Cenco		Technical schooling center	Private	Los Andes, Quillota, San Antonio, San Felipe, Santiago, Viña del Mar	555
CFT Crecic		Technical schooling center	Private	Cabrero, Concepción, Curanilahue	532
CFT Esane del Norte		Technical schooling center	Private	Antofagasta	437
CFT Instituto de Secretariado Insec		Technical schooling center	Private	Santiago, Viña del Mar	417
CFT Alpes		Technical schooling center	Private	Los Álamos, Santiago	343
CFT Ceitec		Technical schooling center	Private	Santiago	307
CFT Luis Alberto Vera		Technical schooling center	Private	Illapel	288
CFT Cepa de la III Región		Technical schooling center	Private	Copiapó	197
CFT Escuela Culinaria Francesa - Ecole		Technical schooling center	Private	Santiago	178
CFT Profasoc		Technical schooling center	Private	Río Bueno	161
CFT Fontanar		Technical schooling center	Private	Santiago	140
CFT Estudio Profesor Valero		Technical schooling center	Private	Santiago	137
CFT de la Industria Grafica - Ingraf		Technical schooling center	Private	Santiago	131
CFT Diego Portales		Technical schooling center	Private	Chillán, Concepción, Santiago, Viña del Mar	130
CFT Protec		Technical schooling center	Private	Temuco	107
CFT de Enseñanza de Alta Costura Paulina Diard		Technical schooling center	Private	Santiago	83
CFT Escuela de Artes Aplicadas Oficios del Fuego		Technical schooling center	Private	Santiago	80
CFT Centro Tecnológico Superior Infomed		Technical schooling center	Private	Santiago	71
CFT Finning		Technical schooling center	Private	Antofagasta	59
CFT Crownliet		Technical schooling center	Private	Santiago	57
CFT Laplace		Technical schooling center	Private	Santiago	42
CFT Alfa		Technical schooling center	Private	Constitución	39
CFT Barros Arana		Technical schooling center	Private	Cauquenes, Concepción	36
CFT Ceponal		Technical schooling center	Private	Valparaíso	32
CFT Instituto Superior Alemán de Comercio Insalco		Technical schooling center	Private	Santiago	26
CFT Escuela de Intérpretes Inceni		Technical schooling center	Private	Santiago	22
CFT Osorno		Technical schooling center	Private	Osorno	11

== See also ==
- List of colleges and universities by country
- List of colleges and universities
