= Council of Rectors of Chilean Universities =

Chilean organization

Council of Rectors
- Council of Rectors of Chilean Universities
- Consejo de Rectores de las Universidades Chilenas
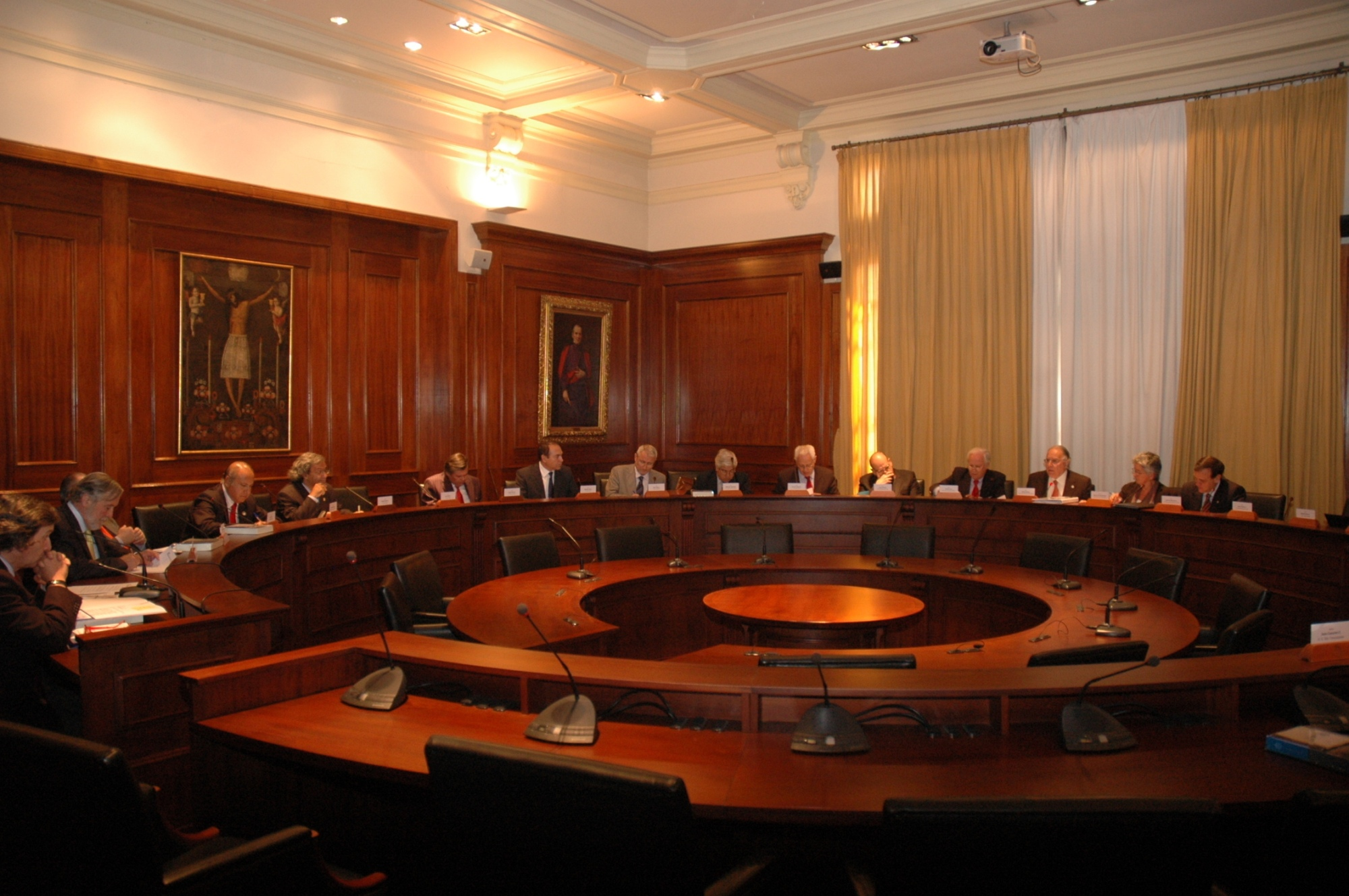
- 2010 meeting of the Council of Rectors of Chilean Universities
- Abbreviation: CRUCH
- Formation: August 14, 1954; 72 years ago
- Legal status: Organization with legal personhood
- Headquarters: Alameda 1371
- Location: Santiago, Chile
- Field: Academia
- Members: 30 (2019)
- President: Nicolás Cataldo Astorga
- Executive vicepresident: Emilio Rodríguez Ponce
- Alternate executive vicepresident: Carlos Saavedra Rubilar
- Main organ: Council
- Parent organization: Ministry of Education
- Funding: State
- Website: consejoderectores.cl

The Council of Rectors of Chilean Universities (Spanish: Consejo de Rectores de las Universidades Chilenas) (Cruch) or simply the Council of Rectors is an organization and legal entity that reunites the rectors of thirty Chilean universities, both public and private with the goal of coordinating the academic efforts in the country and bettering the quality of university education.

The council was created by law in 1954 and given legal personhood in 1964. The members of this organization are the rectors of public and private universities founded before 1981 or derived from those founded before then, and those created by law.

Only universities belonging to Cruch have the right to direct financial support from the state, and the amount of the Solidarity Fund of University Credit (Spanish: Fondo Solidario de Crédito Universitario) assigned by institution since 1994, which replaced the Fiscal University Credit.

The universities grouped under the Council of Rectors are commonly called "traditional universities" (Spanish: universidades tradicionales).

== History ==
The Council of Rectors was founded August 14, 1954 by law number 11575. Its first goal was to prepare coordination plans for technological investigations on a yearly basis according to the budgets of the involved universities. It was first composed by the rectors of seven higher education institutions: the University of Chile, the University of Concepción, the Pontifical Catholic University of Chile, the Pontifical Catholic University of Valparaíso, the Technical University of the Estate and the Federico Santa María Technical University.

It was given legal personhood in February 4, 1964 by law number 15561, in which it was also given the function of giving proposals for initiatives and solutions destined to coordinate, in general, the activities of the universities and to better the performance and quality of university education.

That same year, the Council of Rectors' first regulations were published through a decree by the Ministry of Education. (Note: The source leads to Decree with force of law 2, which revises the work of Decree 10502, which is referenced in the text.) The original goal of the administration of public investigation funds was maintained until the creation of the National Commission for Scientific and Technological Research in 1967.

Until 1975, the president and legal representative of the Council was the rector of the University of Chile. With the law decree 1287, the president and legal representative of the Council became the current minister of education.

Through decrees in 1984 and 1986, seventeen more higher education institutiones joined the Council of Rectors.

In 2018, the promulgation of law number 21091 eliminated the veto of private universities founded after 1981, with new requirements for their joining of the Council established in the law. With these new requirements, the rectors of the Diego Portales University and Alberto Hurtado University were accepted as members of the Council, being the first private universities founded after 1981 to do so.

In 2019, the rector of the University of the Andes was accepted as a member of the Council, being the latest rector to join it.

== Members ==
List of members of Council of Rectors
| University | Main campus | Established | Type | Rector |
|---|---|---|---|---|
| University of Chile | Santiago | 1842 | State | Rosa Devés |
| Pontifical Catholic University of Chile | Santiago | 1888 | Private | Juan Carlos de la Llera |
| University of Concepción | Concepción | 1919 | Private | Carlos Saavedra |
| Pontifical Catholic University of Valparaíso | Valparaíso | 1928 | Private | Nelson Vásquez |
| Federico Santa María Technical University | Valparaíso | 1931 | Private | Juan Yuz |
| Austral University of Chile | Valdivia | 1954 | Private | Egon Montecinos |
| Catholic University of the North | Antofagasta | 1956 | Private | María Cecilia Hernández |
| University of Valparaíso | Valparaíso | 1981 | State | Osvaldo Corrales |
| University of Antofagasta | Antofagasta | 1981 | State | Marcos Cikutovic |
| University of La Frontera | Temuco | 1981 | State | Juan Manuel Fierro |
| University of La Serena | La Serena | 1981 | State | Luperfina Rojas |
| University of Santiago, Chile | Santiago | 1981 | State | Cristián Muñoz |
| University of Magallanes | Punta Arenas | 1981 | State | José Maripani |
| University of Talca | Talca | 1981 | State | Carlos Torres |
| University of Atacama | Copiapó | 1981 | State | Forlín Aguilera |
| University of Tarapacá | Arica | 1981 | State | Emilio Rodríguez |
| Diego Portales University | Santiago | 1982 | Private | Carlos Peña González |
| Arturo Prat University | Iquique | 1984 | State | Alberto Martinez |
| Metropolitan University of Educational Sciences | Santiago | 1985 | State | Solange Tenorio |
| Playa Ancha University | Valparaíso | 1985 | State | Carlos González |
| University of the Bío Bío | Concepción | 1988 | State | Benito Umaña |
| University of Los Lagos | Osorno | 1993 | State | Óscar Garrido |
| Metropolitan University of Technology | Santiago | 1993 | State | Marisol Durán |
| Catholic University of the Maule | Talca | 1991 | Private | Claudio Rojas |
| Catholic University of the Most Holy Conception | Concepción | 1991 | Private | Christian Mellado |
| Temuco Catholic University | Temuco | 1991 | Private | Marcela Momberg |
| Alberto Hurtado University | Santiago | 1997 | Private | Cristián del Campo |
| University of O'Higgins | Rancagua | 2015 | State | Fernanda Kri |
| University of Aysén | Coyhaique | 2015 | State | Enrique Urra |
| University of the Americas | Santiago | 1988 | Private | José Antonio Guzmán |
