= Consortium of Universities of the State of Chile =

Nonprofit corporation of Chilean public universities

The Consortium of Universities of the State of Chile is a nonprofit corporation that brings together all of Chile's public universities. As Chile is a unitary state, the public university system is centrally coordinated, and the consortium plays a key role in representing the interests of state institutions in matters of public policy, funding, and higher education development.

== History ==
The creation of this institution was part of a process of decentralization of Chilean public higher education, in line with the country's regionalization process. Previously, the University of Chile operated as a centralized organization with various campuses throughout the country.

In 1981, under the military dictatorship led by General Augusto Pinochet, the government initiated a reform of the higher education system, which they described as a "modernization" process. This reform dismantled the national university system, resulting in the division of the regional campuses of the University of Chile and the Universidad Técnica del Estado into separate, autonomous universities in each region. Before the separation, major academic and administrative decisions concerning all regional campuses were made in Santiago, the capital city. This centralized structure limited the autonomy of regional campuses, as decisions on curriculum, faculty appointments, budgeting, and infrastructure were largely controlled by central authorities in the main campus. The lack of regional input in decision-making was one of the main criticisms that led to calls for greater local control and relevance in higher education. From the opposition to the Pinochet regime and various left-wing political sectors, the 1981 separation was interpreted as a deliberate dismemberment of the University of Chile. This action was seen as having a political objective: to weaken the university's historic role as a center of critical thought and intellectual opposition to the authoritarianism.

These new institutions became the public universities of the respective regions and were later integrated into the Consortium of State Universities of Chile. Despite the state's diminished direct role in higher education funding during the following decades, these universities remained public and continued to play a key role in the development of their local communities, while also facing new challenges related to autonomy, financing, and competitiveness in the national education system.

== Members ==
The Consortium of State Universities of Chile is composed of the 18 public universities of Chile, all of which are also members of the Council of Rectors of Chilean Universities (CRUCH).

=== Member universities of the Consortium in order of foundation ===
1. University of Chile, November 19, 1842.
2. University of Valparaíso, February 12, 1981.
3. University of Antofagasta, March 20, 1981.
4. University of La Frontera, March 20, 1981.
5. University of La Serena, March 20, 1981.
6. University of Santiago, Chile, March 21, 1981.
7. University of Atacama, October 26, 1981.
8. University of Magallanes, October 26, 1981.
9. University of Talca, October 26, 1981.
10. University of Tarapacá, December 11, 1981.
11. Arturo Prat University, December 14, 1984.
12. Playa Ancha University, September 4, 1985.
13. Metropolitan University of Educational Sciences, September 4, 1985.
14. University of Bío-Bío, September 29, 1988.
15. University of Los Lagos, August 30, 1993.
16. Metropolitan Technological University, August 30, 1993.
17. University of Aysén, August 7, 2015.
18. University of O'Higgins, August 7, 2015.
