= Claudio Sáez Avaria =

- Born: Chile
- Education: Universidad de Valparaiso; Victoria University of Wellington; University of Plymouth
- Scientific career
- Fields: Marine biology, Environmental biotechnology
- Workplaces: Universidad de Alicante; Universidad de Playa Ancha; Universidad de Santiago de Chile

Claudio Sáez Avaria is a Chilean and Spanish researcher, author, marine biologist and environmental biotechnologist.

== Early life and education ==
Sáez Avaria obtained his degree in Environmental Engineering from the Universidad de Valparaíso in Chile. He completed a Ph.D. in Marine Studies at University of Plymouth in the United Kingdom in 2014 and later joined Universidad de Playa Ancha as a full-time researcher after working as a post-doctoral researcher at the Universidad de Santiago de Chile.

== Career ==
Sáez Avaria was the director of the University of Playa Ancha's Coastal Environmental Research Laboratory and a researcher at the Center for Advanced Studies.

In 2019, he founded the Environmental HUB UPLA.

He is working as an associate professor in Marine Environmental Research and Development at the University of Alicante.

In 2025, Sáez Avaria was awarded the Banco Sabadell Foundation Award for Marine Sustainability IV edition.

=== Selected publications ===
- "Evaluating physico-chemical and biological impacts of brine discharges for a sustainable desalination development on South America's Pacific coast". scholar.google.com.
- Removal of As from Tambo River Using Sodium Alginate from Lessonia trabeculata (Aracanto)
- Beca de Doctorado de Sáez-Avaria, Claudio Alejandro
- "Multi-criteria analysis for sustainable and cost-effective development of desalination plants in Chile". scholar.google.com.
- Desalination brine effects beyond excess salinity: Unravelling specific stress signaling and tolerance responses in the seagrass Posidonia oceanica.
- Mechanisms of Copper Tolerance, Accumulation, and Detoxification in the Marine Macroalga Ulva compressa (Chlorophyta): 20 Years of Research
- "A risk assessment on Zostera chilensis, the last relict of marine angiosperms in the South-East Pacific Ocean, due to the development of the desalination industry in Chile". scholar.google.com.
- "Posidonia oceanica L.(Delile) meadows regression: long-term affection may be induced by multiple impacts". scholar.google.com.
- "Chile: environmental status and future perspectives". scholar.google.com.
- "Mechanisms of metal tolerance in marine macroalgae, with emphasis on copper tolerance in Chlorophyta and Rhodophyta". scholar.google.com.
- "A simple and effective method for high quality co-extraction of genomic DNA and total RNA from low biomass Ectocarpus siliculosus, the model brown alga". scholar.google.com.
- "Variation in patterns of metal accumulation in thallus parts of Lessonia trabeculata (Laminariales; Phaeophyceae): implications for biomonitoring". scholar.google.com.
- Environmental assessment in a shallow subtidal rocky habitat: Approach coupling chemical and ecological tools
