= Malaimagen =

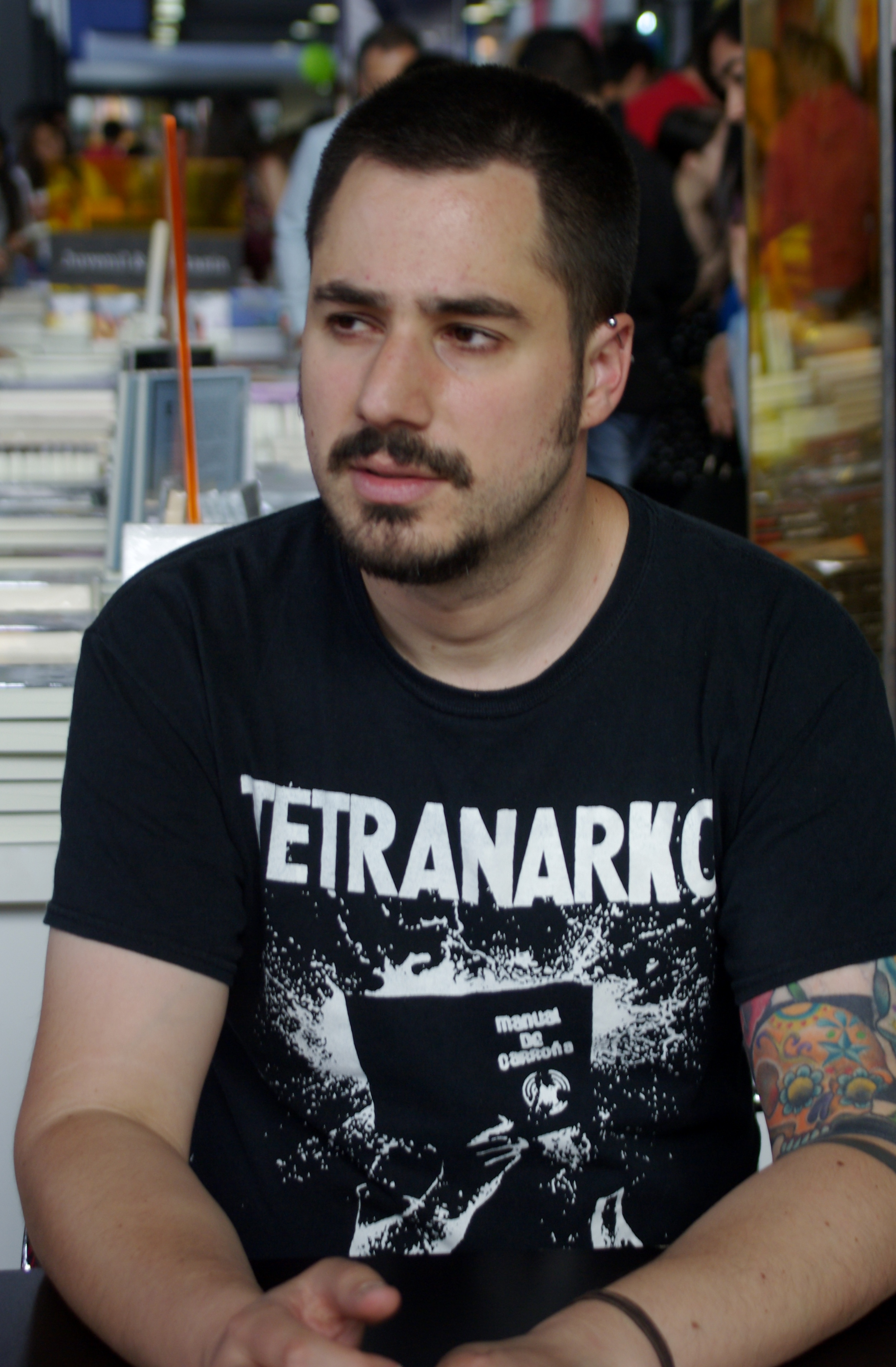
- Malaimagen at FILSA 2016.
- Born: Guillermo Nicolás Galindo Kuscevic; May 1, 1981 (age 45); Santiago, Chile
- Occupations: Illustrator; cartoonist; musician
- Writing career
- Genre: Comedy
- Website: malaimagen.com

Malaimagen (born Guillermo Nicolás Galindo Kuscevic, 1 May 1981, Santiago) is a Chilean cartoonist. He studied Graphic Design at Metropolitan University of Technology (UTEM).

== Career` ==
In 2007, Kuscevic created a blog to publish his cartoons, then adopted the nickname Malaimagen (Bad Image).

In 2008, Malaimagen began to work as an artist for the magazine Cañamo. He worked there until 2012.

In 2011, he began to make cartoon parodies of the political program Tolerancia Cero, which were published in the Chilean magazine The Clinic. These comics became popular across social networks.

In 2014, Malaimagen created an animated video for a song by the singer Anita Tijoux and an exposition together with the draftsman Guillo, one of the most important proponents of graphic humour in Chile.

== Works ==
- La cuenta por favor (2009)
- Abajo las manos (2010)
- Voy saliendo (2011)
- Pase usted (2012)
- 5 segundos (2012)
- Sin tolerancia (2013)
- Pan y circo (2014)
- Boleta o Factura (2016)
- Malditos humanos (2016)
