= Kathleen Whitlock =

Chilean neuroscientist

- Education: University of Washington
- Scientific career
- Thesis: Wings of desire : an analysis of wing sensory axon development in wild-type and mutant Drosophila melanogaster (1993)

Kathleen Whitlock is a Chilean neuroscientist, researcher and academic. She is professor at University of Valparaíso's Interdisciplinary Center for Neuroscience of Valparaiso. Whitlock was the first Latin American president-elect (2023–2024) of the International Zebrafish Society.

== Education and career ==
Whitlock earned a B.S. (1985) and an M.S. (1987) from the State University of New York at Albany. She earned her Ph.D. from the University of Washington in 1993. Following postdoctoral work at the University of Oregon, she was an assistant professor at Cornell University from 1998 until 2006. In 2006 she was named a full professor at the University of Valparaíso, Chile.

== Research ==
Whitlock is known for her research on the development of olfactory systems, which she examines using zebrafish as a model organism. Her work includes investigations into the hormones controlling puberty. Whitlock also helped establish a center in Valparaiso that teaches science in a manner that engages children.

== Selected publications ==
- Whitlock, Kathleen E.; Westerfield, Monte (1998-11-01). "A Transient Population of Neurons Pioneers the Olfactory Pathway in the Zebrafish". The Journal of Neuroscience. 18 (21): 8919–8927. doi:10.1523/JNEUROSCI.18-21-08919.1998. ISSN 0270-6474. PMC 6793523. PMID 9786997.
- Whitlock, Kathleen E.; Westerfield, Monte (2000-09-01). "The olfactory placodes of the zebrafish form by convergence of cellular fields at the edge of the neural plate". Development. 127 (17): 3645–3653. doi:10.1242/dev.127.17.3645. ISSN 0950-1991. PMID 10934010.
- Whitlock, K. E; Wolf, C. D; Boyce, M. L (2003-05-01). "Gonadotropin-releasing hormone (gnrh) cells arise from cranial neural crest and adenohypophyseal regions of the neural plate in the zebrafish, danio rerio". Developmental Biology. 257 (1): 140–152. doi:10.1016/S0012-1606(03)00039-3. ISSN 0012-1606. PMID 12710963.
- Whitlock, Kathleen E. (2005-05-01). "Origin and development of GnRH neurons". Trends in Endocrinology & Metabolism. 16 (4): 145–151. doi:10.1016/j.tem.2005.03.005. ISSN 1043-2760. PMID 15860410.
- Whitlock, Kathleen Elizabeth; Universidad de Valparaíso (Chile). Programa Ciencia al Tiro (2014). La alegría de la ciencia (in Spanish). [Chile: Universidad de Valparaíso]. OCLC 1423721333.
