= Magallania =

- Discipline: Social sciences, humanities
- Language: Spanish
- Edited by: Fabiana María Martin

Publication details
- History: 1970–present
- Publisher: University of Magallanes (Chile)
- Frequency: Biannually
- Open access: yes

Standard abbreviations
- ISO 4: Magallania

Indexing
- ISSN: 0718-0209 (print); 0718-2244 (web)
- OCLC no.: 225866115

Links
- Journal homepage; Online archive

Magallania is an academic journal published by the University of Magallanes. It focuses on articles in the fields of social sciences and humanities related to Patagonia, Tierra del Fuego, and Antarctica. The journal was initially published annually from its establishment in 1970 until 2005 when it transitioned to being issued twice a year.
