= Metropolitan University of Technology =

Public university in Chile

- Universidad Tecnológica Metropolitana
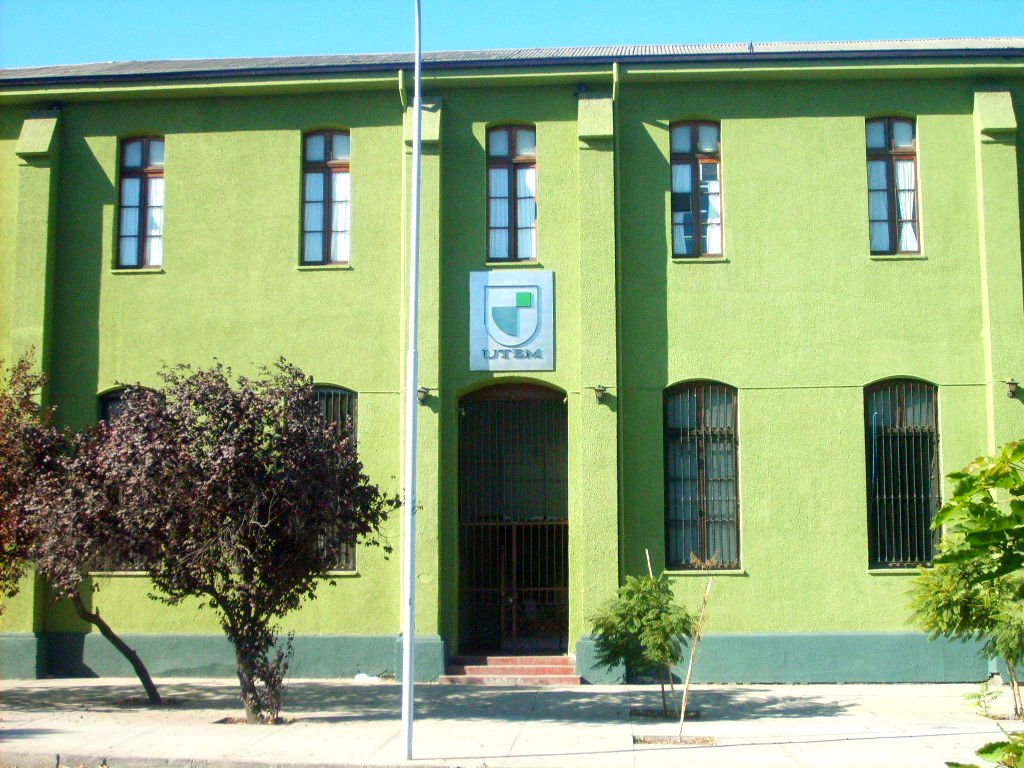
- Type: Public
- Established: 30 August 1993
- President: Luis Pinto Faverio
- Undergraduates: ~8000
- Location: Santiago, Chile; 33.4485°S 70.6580°W
- Campus: Urban
- Campuses: 8
- Website: www.utem.cl

Metropolitan University of Technology (Spanish: Universidad Tecnológica Metropolitana) is a university in Chile. It is part of the Chilean Traditional Universities. The Metropolitan Technological University, better known by its acronym as UTEM, is a state institution of public higher education in Chile. It was founded on August 30, 1993, after the breakup of the University of Chile.

It is one of the sixteen universities of the Consortium of Universities of the State of Chile, and belongs to the Council of Rectors of Chilean Universities.

It has four branches, all located in the Metropolitan Region. Its head office is in the municipality of Santiago, being part of the old houses of Dieciocho street, which was declared a heritage zone by the National Monuments Council of Chile.

The UTEM is currently accredited by the National Accreditation Commission (CNA-Chile) for three years, since its renovation in December 2013 to December 2016.

== History ==
The Metropolitan Technological University (UTEM) was founded from Santiago Professional Institute (IPS), which was formed in 1981 after the military regime dismembered the University of Chile, disappeared from IPUCH (Polytechnic Institute of the University of Chile) and other races that were left out of the University of Chile, such as: Construction, Architecture, Library, Cartography, Social Work and Design. The enactment of Law No. 19,239, was made in a ceremony led by the then rector of this study, and founder Luis Pinto prepulsor Faverio, Patricio Aylwin Azócar and Education Minister Jorge Arrate, at the Palace of La Moneda. On August 30, 1993, was published in the Official Journal of the Republic of Chile, the decree creating the Metropolitan Technological University (UTEM), which constitutes the last of the Universities Council of Rectors.

In the beginning, i.e. from 1993 to 2002, the UTEM starts delivering careers professional area of Engineering and the Social Area, becoming the state university which receives more young people in the first two income quintiles, from schools municipal and subsidized. In 2002, the UTEM begins to dictate the race of Criminology at the levels of technical (expert), graduates (scientists) Degree, which will have a major impact on subsequent attempts of institutional accreditation.

The UTEM is a Chilean state university which receives every year about 1,500 students, has four offices in Santiago, with an area of 58,000 m^{2}. Doctor Honoris Causa

On March 20, 1996, the UTEM delivered its first title Doctor Honoris Causa former President Patricio Aylwin Azócar, in recognition of his outstanding professional and academic career, and her starring role in the history of our country.

In May of that same year, the UTEM awarded its second title Doctor Honoris Causa Edgardo Henriquez Frodden doctor for his professional and academic career.

The third Honoris Causa was awarded to former President Ricardo Lagos Escobar on April 30, 1998, and seven years later, as high honor was awarded to Dr. Gui Bonsiepe, recognized theoretical, industrial designer, international consultant and author required reading numerous texts in the discipline of design. In December 2010, the institution was accredited by CNA-Chile, but due to administrative problems and academic 9 only achieved by a year. However, appeared in the newspaper La Nacion audited annual balance sheet, showing positive number, thus giving clear progress of their term of crisis.

On November 15, 2011, a study by the Council of State of Chile Transparency ranked the UTEM as the state university that best met the Government Transparency Act, a 59.53%. On 29 December that year, the university got reaccreditation, this time for the period 2011 to 2013. Reacreditarse again in December 2013 to December 2015. After an administrative appeal to CNA Chile, accreditation was extended for 3 years (until 29 December 2016). The Metropolitan Technological University has 5 faculties distributed in Santiago, reaching an approximate 58,000 m^{2} of buildings and landscaping area, has 53 Undergraduate Degree, 34 and 19 PSU login evening special income.

His most extensive, and more number of students based, is the Faculty of Engineering which has an enrollment of nearly 4,000 students, ranking in the commune of Providencia, at the intersection of Avenida Greece Avenida José Pedro Alessandri (Though ago few years communal boundaries between Providencia and Macul changed leaving the seat in the municipality of Providencia, it still retains the name of Macul headquarters). In it there recently constructed buildings that blend with the old buildings of the Hebrew Institute, which operated until about 1980.

Likewise, the college acquired property and building in the town of Providence, for the operation of the Faculty of Management and Economics by the Dean, with capacity for over 2,000 students.

Within Headquarters, is the Chapel of Gothic Revival style, located in the second courtyard of a historical Casona Colonial, which is open to the public on Heritage Day in Chile.

Near the Central House are the Faculties of Humanities, Mapping and Architecture, in the municipality of Santiago.
