= University of Santiago, Chile =

Chilean university

Coordinates: 33°27′S 70°41′W

Universidad de Santiago de Chile
- Universidad de Santiago de Chile seal
- Motto: Labor Lætitia Nostra (Latin)
- Motto in English: Work is Our Joy
- Type: Public
- Established: June 21, 1849; 176 years ago (EAO); April 9, 1947 (UTE); March 21, 1981 (USACH)
- Founders: Ignacy Domeyko
- Rector: Rodrigo Vidal Rojas
- Academic staff: 2762
- Students: 21,520
- Undergraduates: 20,546
- Postgraduates: 974
- Location: Santiago, RM, Chile
- Campus: Urban (340,000 m^{2})
- Majors: 55
- Mascot: Lion
- Website: www.usach.cl

The University of Santiago, Chile (Usach) (Spanish: Universidad de Santiago de Chile) is one of the oldest public research universities in Chile. It was founded as Escuela de Artes y Oficios (Spanish: School of Arts and Careers) in 1849 by Ignacy Domeyko, under the government of Manuel Bulnes. It became Universidad Técnica del Estado (Spanish: Technical University of the State) in 1947, with various campuses throughout the country. In 1981, as a consequence of a reform on higher education under the dictatorship of Augusto Pinochet, it became what is now known as Universidad de Santiago de Chile, with all activities centered in a single 340,000 m^{2} campus in the capital Santiago.

== History ==
The University of Santiago of Chile (USACH) started as the School of Arts and Crafts in 1849. It was born in the mid-20th century and it is the fifth oldest university in Chile.

=== Escuela de Artes y Oficios ===
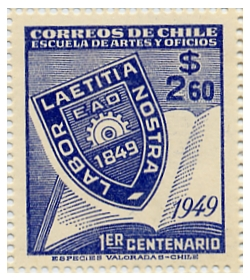
EAO commemorative stamp

The Escuela de Artes y Oficios (EAO) (Spanish School of Arts and Crafts) was founded on July 6, 1849, by Ignacy Domeyko, during the Manuel Bulnes Prieto rule, to improve scientific and technical development in the country. It started with four workshops: Mining, Mechanics, Casting and Carpentry. At the time, students ages ranged between 15 and 18 years old, thus making the EAO not a university, but a secondary education entity. Students were required to read and write and to know basic arithmetic operations. Besides being intensely trained in workshops, students studied algebra, descriptive geometry, trigonometry, technical drawing, industrial mechanics, physics and chemistry, besides Spanish, history and geography. This was a four-year education that later, in 1858, extended to five years. Graduates were called 'apprentices'.

In 1886 the EAO moved to a bigger building, located at Quinta Normal, where it would stay up until now. In 1912 it started to educate 'industrial sub-engineers', later known as 'technicians'. By the time, the EAO was able to grant two education level degrees: Arts and Crafts degrees (secondary education level) and Technician degrees (tertiary education level), and by 1936 it granted Industrial Engineering degrees too.

=== Universidad Técnica del Estado ===
Later during the presidency of Gabriel González Videla through the DFL Decree No. 1831 of April 9, 1947, the School of Arts and Crafts was joined with the School of Mining in Copiapó (1857), La Serena (1887) and Antofagasta (1918), with the Industrial Design Schools (1905) in Temuco (1916) and Valdivia (1934), with the Industrial Engineering Schools in Santiago (1940) and with the Technical Pedagogy Institute. Together these formed the Technical State University (Universidad Técnica del Estado, UTE), resulting in it becoming the best Chilean university in the area of applied engineering and industrial technician training. On February 8, 1952, the first statute that allowed the grouping to begin functioning as a university in legal, administrative and academic terms, was enacted. Its first president was Don Octavio Valenzuela Lazo (March 12, 1952 to March 12, 1953). In 1958, the Teknos, the university's troupe, was founded. Academic activity remained in the hands of the four Faculty Councils under the tuition of the University Council. During the 1960s, the DFL No. 2, 1971, allowed for the enacting of a second organizational statute, which allowed the university to be organized through offices, colleges, departments, and all academic structures that the board would deem appropriate.

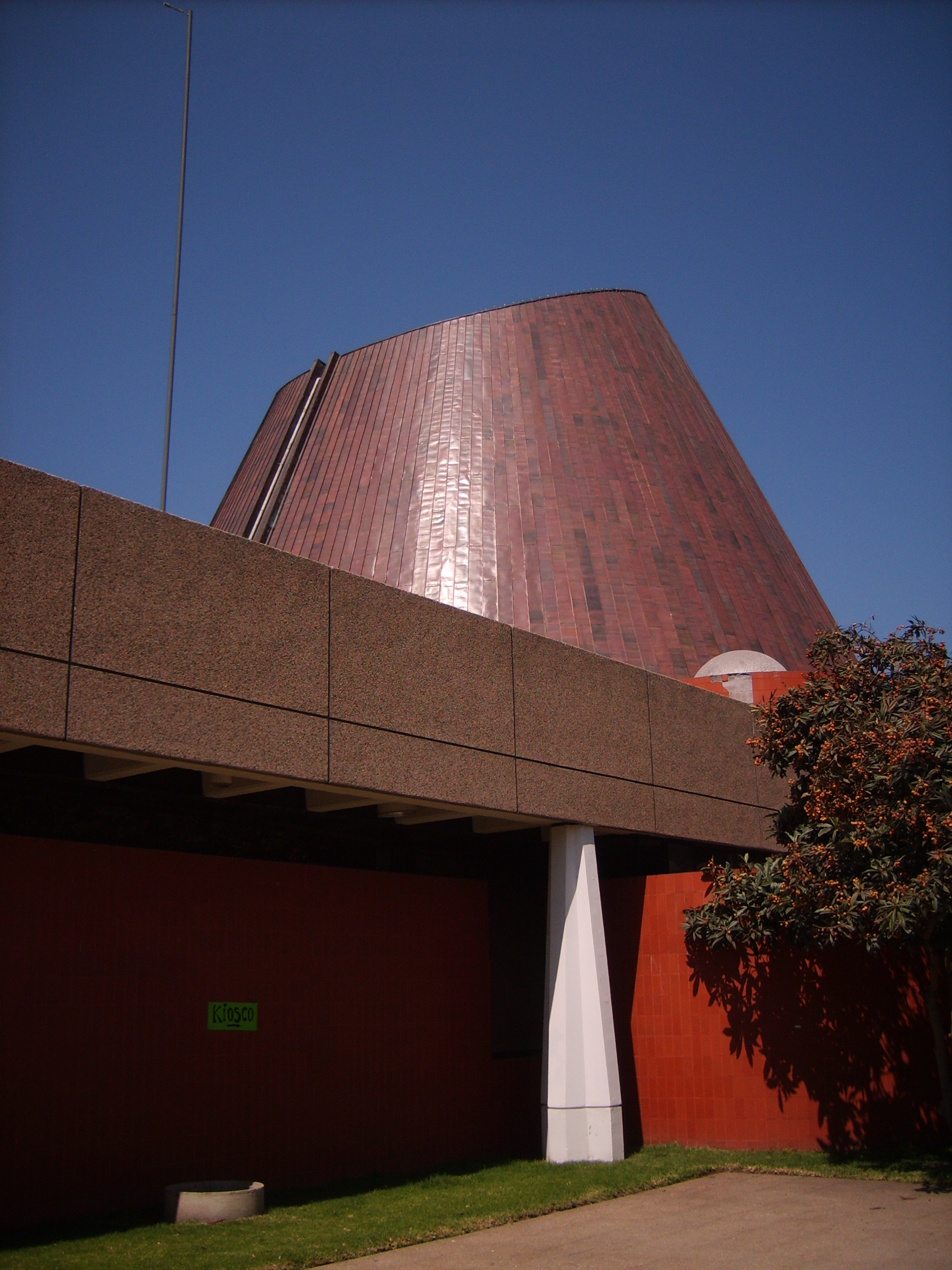
Planetarium.at University de Santiago de Chile

In 1968 due to the University Reform of 1967–1973, Enrique Kirberg Baltiansky assumed the rectory, the only university rector fully elected by faculty and students.

In 1971, during the government of Salvador Allende, Revised Statutes of the Universidad Técnica del Estado were approved. During the 1973 coup, Kirberg was removed from his post and imprisoned by the military regime, the statute previously approved was declared void, and new guidelines were reformulated with appointments done entirely by the military regime.

The musician and poet Víctor Jara, who worked as a professor at the university, was arrested by Pinochet's forces, tortured and murdered days later.

=== Universidad de Santiago de Chile ===
In 1981, the military regime through the DFL Decree No. 23 of March 21, 1981, divided the headquarters of the State Technical University, giving rise to new universities and professional institutes. Steps were taken to form the headquarters into the University of Santiago de Chile. The other sites became separately named universities such as the University of Atacama, the University of Antofagasta, the University of Serena, the Professional Institute of Talca (later transformed into the University of Talca), the University of the Bío-Bío, the University of La Frontera, the Professional Institute of Osorno (subsequently transformed into the University of Los Lagos), the Professional Institute of Valdivia (later integrated in 1988 into the Southern University of Chile) and the Magellan Professional Institute (later transformed into the University of Magallanes). The University of Santiago de Chile, near the University of Atacama and the University of Magallanes are the only heirs of the traditional State Technical University, because at the time of the dissolution and the creation of the new universities in 1981, the headquarters (Santiago), Copiapó and Punta Arenas, were not integrated with other university offices. The headquarters is located where the old School of Arts and Crafts used to be in the municipality of Estación Central. One of its symbols is the planetarium built in the 1980s.

== Departments ==
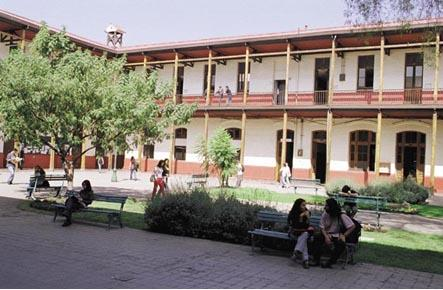
View of the School of Arts and Crafts, Patio de los Héroes.

The university houses over 18,000 undergraduate students in 66 different majors, in the following departments:

- Engineering (Ingeniería),
- Bachelors Program in Arts and Sciences (Bachillerato),
- Business Administration & Economics (Administración y Economía),
- Chemistry & Biology (Química y Biología),
- Medical Sciences (Ciencias Médicas),
- Sciences (Ciencias),
- Humanities (Humanidades),
- School of Architecture (Escuela de Arquitectura), and
- Technology Department (Facultad Tecnológica).

== Independent Organizations ==
=== Feusach ===
The University of Santiago Students Federation (Feusach) is an organization that represents and aims to protect all the students enrolled at University of Santiago in matters relating to the higher education system, i.e. decisions and actions of university, academic and political officials dealing with the public service of the higher education given by the university. It also works as a union bond between the huge number of students and authorities of the university in order to promote the mutual collaboration for the university management, and also seeks to promote the harmonious development of students at the large university campus thus generating and establishing an important space for politics and university management in the country.

=== Afusach ===
The association of servants of the University of Santiago, Chile is an association formed by servants representatives who work for the university. This association, as a union, acts to represent and protect the collective interests of workers before the action of the university officials, and in general before the State political decisions regarding human resources management and civil service. As an association it is ruled by the Administrative Statute and by extract, it is ruled by the Labour Code.

=== University of Santiago Planetarium ===
Planetario Chile is located at the University Campus; it covers 13,380 m^{2}, made up of a building, square, gardens, water mirror and parking for 100 cars. Single in its kind in the country, it's one of the biggest 50 astronomical audiovisual centres in the world. The astronomical dome is 22 m diameter and the stars simulation equipment, a Carl Zeiss projector, model VI, and allows observing the southern and northern night sky.

== Communication Media ==
=== University of Santiago, Chile Radio and Television (1959 to present) ===
In 1959, the Universidad Técnica del Estado radio was launched, local radio station with subsidiaries in towns where UTE was present. After the arrival of television and the cinema development in Chile during the 1960, UTE founded the Cinema and Television Department. During these years, this department develops a series of documentaries that showed the work of the institution in that time.

In 1971, the UTE cinema department released its first production "El Sueldo de Chile" (1971) directed by Fernando Balmaceda. By then, the Universidad Técnica del Estado was planning to open a television signal in Channel 11, whose intentions were finally aborted after the coup d'état in 1973. In 1979, 11 VHF dial of Santiago, Chile was transferred to the known as Universidad de Chile Television, today known as Chilevision.

Due to the university reform in 1981, Universidad Técnica del Estado Radio and its subsidiaries in the country broke up and were replaced by Universidad de Santiago Radio, Universidad de Talca Radio, Universidad del Bio-Bio Radio, Universidad de Atacama Radio, Universidad de Antofagasta Radio, Universidad de La Serena Radio, Universidad de los Lagos Radio, Universidad de Magallanes Radio and Universidad de la Frontera Radio. Universidad de Santiago de Chile Radio assumed the legal continuity of the preceding.

In 1998, students from the informatics career of the aforementioned university led by José Zorrilla, developed a project to transmit the radio via internet and a program transmission system on demand, whose technology would be known six years later as podcasting. At the same time, its web site is launched leading it as the first university radio transmitting via internet with a unique podcasting system in the world.

University of Santiago, Chile radio as well as television contributes to spread local music via cultural programs and hot news such as Escena Viva. Both have their own channel in YouTube. In 2018 the university launched a television channel via signal 48.1 for an on-line open digital television in Santiago, called Santiago Televisión, broadcasting 24 hours.

=== U. de Santiago al Día ===
The university also has a daily newsletter known as "U. de Santiago al Día" that tells about the university events and university scientific news in the field of humanities, sciences and technology.

== Rankings and accreditation ==
University rankings

Global – Overall
- QS World: 490 (2026)
- THE World: 401-500 (2018)

Regional – Overall
- QS Latin America: 14 (2023)

It is currently accredited by the National Accreditation Commission (CNA-Chile) for a period of 7 years (out of a maximum of 7), from February 2021 to February 2028, being one of the 5 universities with maximum accreditation in the country.

The university ranks fourth among Chilean universities according to the CSIC webometric ranking (July 2020). In 2017, Times Higher Education ranked the university within the 401-500 band globally.

According to the QS World University Rankings 2022, the University of Santiago ranked third among Chilean universities and as the second best public higher education institution in the country.

In the QS Latin America University Ranking 2023, the university ranked 4th among Chilean universities and 14th in Latin America.

== Notable people ==
Alumni

- Sergio Campos, journalist, National Prize in Journalism 2011.
- Alicia Herrera Rivera (1928–2013), feminist lawyer; minister of the Court of Appeals of Santiago
- Jeannette Jara, Minister of Labor of Chile.
- Carlos Caszely, former football player. Journalism graduate.

Faculty

- Raquel Olea (born 1944), writer, professor, cultural critic, and researcher

== Stadium ==
Estadio Usach is a multi-use stadium in central Santiago, Chile, named after the Universidad de Santiago de Chile. It is currently used mostly for football matches and until around 2003 was used to host the home matches for Club de Deportes Santiago Morning, which now plays in La Pintana. The stadium holds 3,000 people.
