= University of La Serena =

Coordinates: 29°54′50″S 71°14′29″W

Universidad de La Serena
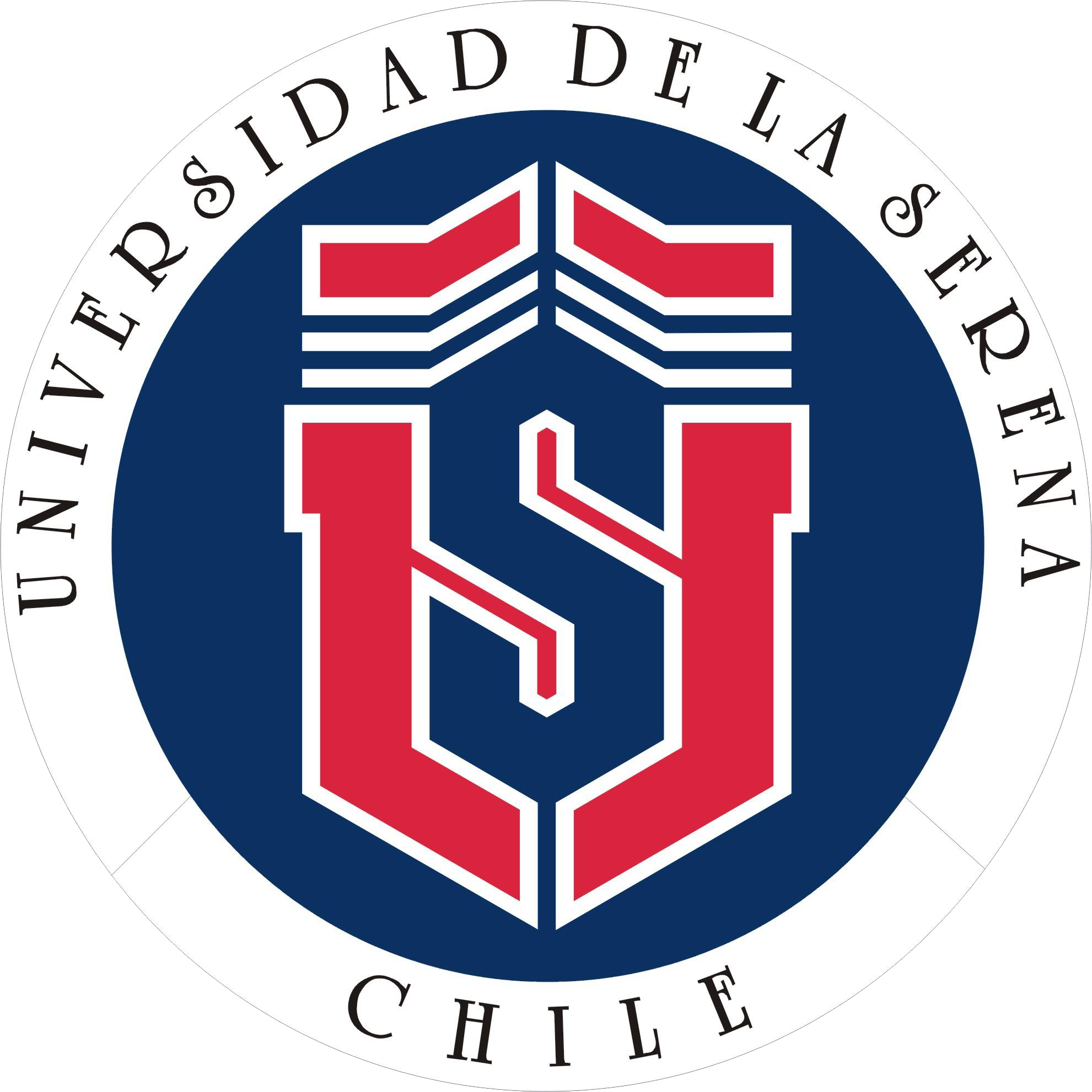
- Motto: Tu Universidad Estatal en la Región Coquimbo (Spanish)
- Motto in English: Your State University in the Coquimbo Region
- Type: Public
- Established: 1981
- Students: 6,799
- Undergraduates: 6,656
- Postgraduates: 143
- Location: La Serena, Coquimbo, Ovalle, Chile
- Website: www.userena.cl

The University of La Serena (Spanish: Universidad de La Serena (ULS)) is a university in Chile. It is part of the Chilean Traditional Universities. It is located 350 miles (460 kilometers) north of Santiago. The university has five campuses: three in La Serena, one in Coquimbo, and one in Ovalle. It was founded in 1981, and approximately 8,000 students are currently enrolled there.

== History ==
The university was formed in 1981 via the fusion of two regional campuses of the nationwide state universities Universidad de Chile and Universidad Técnica del Estado.

The University was founded as an extension of the mining education imparted in the region since the nineteenth century. Its objectives have been to create, promote and divulge the region's scientific, technological, cultural and artistic advancements.

The University consists of a Main Building and 6 campuses located in La Serena, Coquimbo and Ovalle. Ignacio Domeyko arrived from Poland on June 3, 1838 to educate miners, having been hired by the Chilean Government as the Coquimbo Department's Institute of Chemistry and Mineralogy's professor.

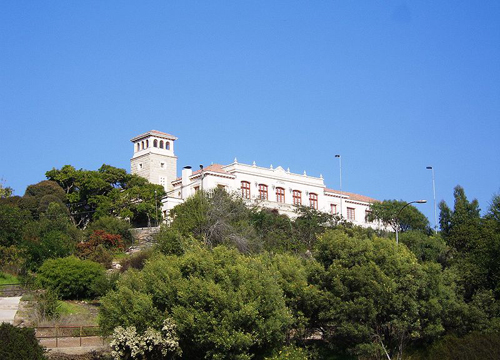
Colina el Pino campus

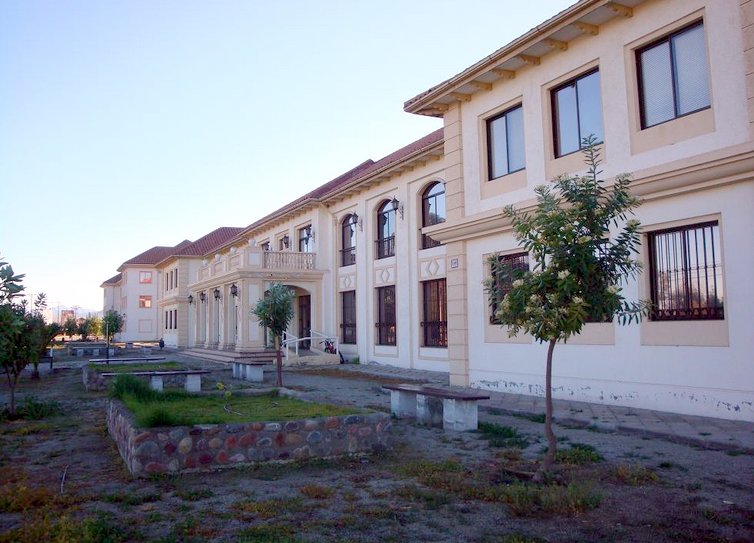
Science Faculty

== See also ==
- List of universities in Chile
