= Alberto Hurtado University =

Jesuit university in Santiago

Coordinates: 33°26′41.34″S 70°39′43.36″W

- Universidad Alberto Hurtado
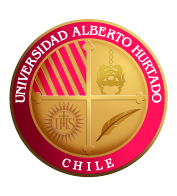
- Motto: The Jesuit University of Chile
- Type: Jesuit
- Established: October 23, 1997; 29 years ago
- President: Cristián del Campo Simonetti
- Rector: Eduardo Silva Arévalo
- Academic staff: 359
- Students: 4300
- Location: Almirante Barroso 6, Santiago, Santiago Metropolitan Region, Chile
- Website: Alberto Hurtado University

Alberto Hurtado University (Spanish: Universidad Alberto Hurtado – UAH) is a Jesuit university located in Santiago, Chile. Established in 1997, the university was created from the merger of three separate institutes: Instituto Latinoamericano de Doctrina y Estudios Sociales (ILADES), the Centro de Investigación, Desarrollo de la Educación (CIDE), and the Fundación Educacional Roberto Bellarmino. The university is named after a famous Chilean Jesuit Saint, Father Alberto Hurtado. UAH is a member of the AUSJAL and of FLACSI.

== Academics ==
The university is composed of six schools: Psychology, Education, Philosophy and Humanities, Law, Economics and Business, and Social Sciences.

The School of Education has its own research Center for Investigation and Development in Education (CIDE). In 2017 the Department of Political Science and International Relations of UAH entered into an agreement with the National Academy of Political and Strategic Studies to join their critical reflection on Chile's relations with South America.

== Social justice ==
UAH has an Interdisciplinary Program on Migration Studies (PRIEM) which links various departments and centers within the university in research, teaching and extension work related to the issue of migrants.

UAH from its interest in assisting the most vulnerable communities extended its educational outreach to the officials of the Municipality of Maipú, for its continuous education and postgraduate programs of the Department of Political Science.

=== Center for Reflection and Social Action ===
The Center for Reflection and Social Action (CREAS) was founded in 1997 at Alberto Hurtado University to foster reflection and social action throughout the university, in pursuit of the Jesuit ideal of educating men and women for others.

CREAS facilitates relations of faculty, students, and administrators with social organizations, and organizes seminars, conferences, and workshops to impact society and public policy. It networks with the Association of Jesuit Universities in Latin America (AUSJAL) in defining the social responsibility of universities and facilitates programs for the university's pastoral department.

CREAS facilitated the founding of the Social Observatory for the monitoring of public policies on social security. It is a member of the Ibero-American Observatory on Human Mobility, migration, and Development.

== See also ==
- List of Jesuit sites
