= University of Magallanes =

University in Punta Arenas, Chile

- Universidad de Magallanes
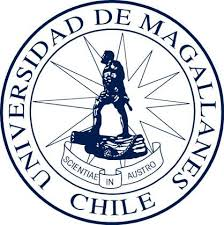
- Former names: Universidad Técnica del Estado
- Motto: Scientiae in Austro
- Motto in English: Knowledge in the South
- Type: Public state university
- Established: 1961; 1981 (UMAG)
- Affiliations: CRUCH, CUE, Agrupación de Universidades Regionales de Chile
- Provost: Dr. Jose Maripani
- Rector: Dr. Juan Oyarzo Perez (2014–2018)
- Students: 3,822 (2020)
- Undergraduates: 3,800
- Postgraduates: 22
- Location: Punta Arenas, Puerto Natales, Porvenir, Puerto Williams, Coyhaique, Región de Magallanes y de la Antártica Chilena, Chile; 53°08′13″S 70°52′47″W
- Colors: Blue and white
- Website: www.umag.cl

University of Magallanes (UMAG) is a university in the southern Chilean city of Punta Arenas. It is a public state university and it is part of the Chilean Traditional Universities. The University of Magallanes was established in 1981 during the neoliberal reforms of the Chile's military regime as the successor of Universidad Técnica del Estado's Punta Arenas section. Universidad Técnica del Estado had established the Punta Arenas section in 1961. The University of Magallanes have campuses in Punta Arenas and Puerto Natales as well as a university centre in Puerto Williams. University of Magallanes publishes the humanities and social sciences journal Magallania twice a year.

== Accreditation ==
The university has full accreditation in all areas and ranks among upper-middle range of universities within the country. In December 2015 the University of Magallanes was notified by the National Accreditation Commission (CNA) of the positive evaluation in all obligatory areas (institutional management and undergraduate teaching) and electives (research, teaching graduate and interaction with medium). The University is accredited by four years until December 2019.

== Faculty and institutes ==
Currently there are five faculties, two autonomous schools and one interdisciplinary institute which perform academic tasks (undergraduate, graduate, research and extension).

- Faculty of Sciences
- Faculty of Engineering
- Faculty of Education and Social Sciences
- Faculty of Health Sciences
- Faculty of Law, Economy and Business
- School of Medicine
- Technological School
- Patagonia Institute

== History ==
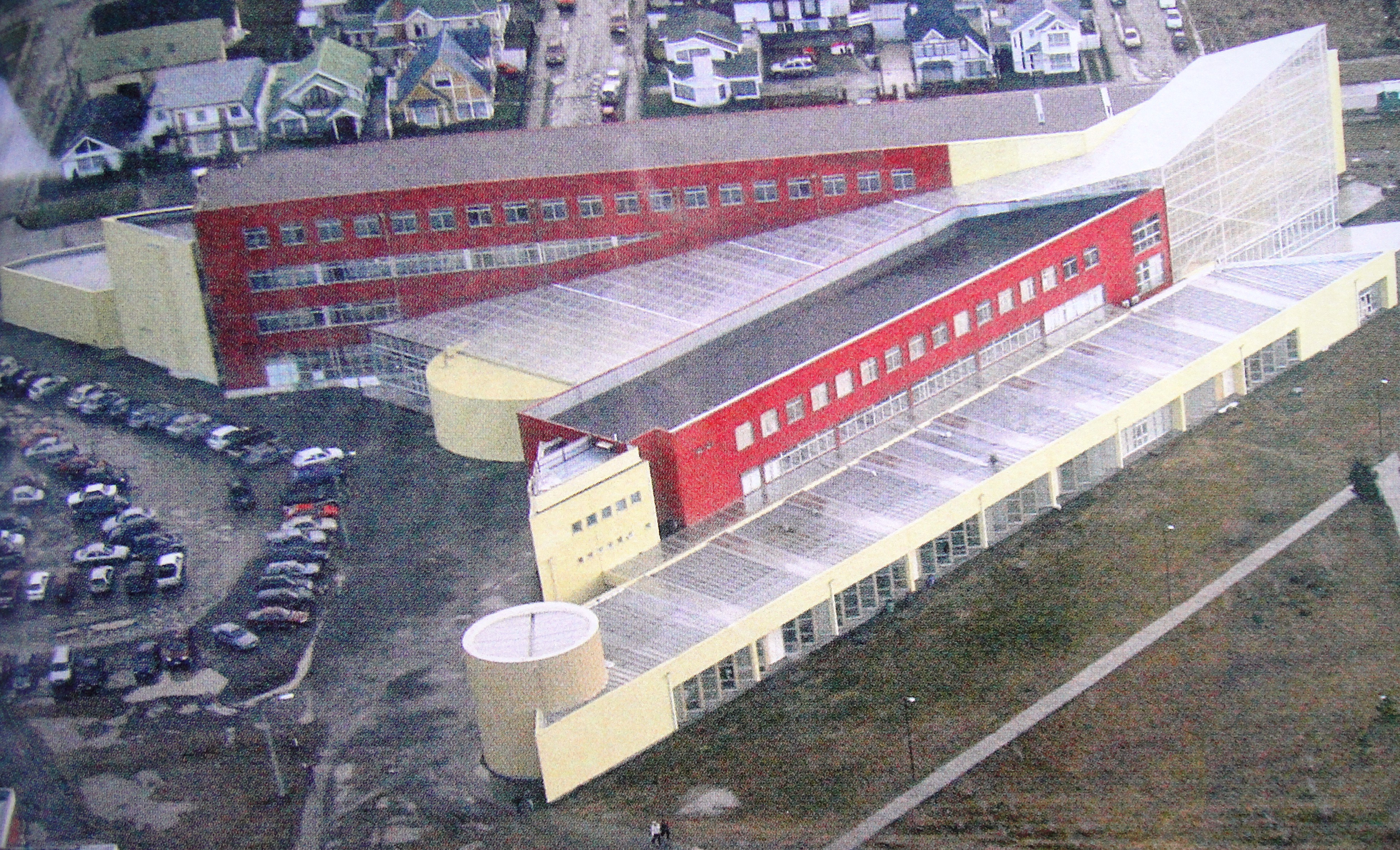
Central Campus in Punta Arenas

University of Magallanes, a member of the Honorable Council of Rectors of Chilean Universities, is a corporation of public law, autonomous, with legal personality and own patrimony.

The university registers its origin in 1961, giving its first courses in Mechanics and Electricity. Through the following 50 years, it developed through various stages and denominations. It was originally created as a campus of the Technical State University. Three years later in 1964 it was denominated University College of Punta Arenas. In March 1981 it became the Magellan Professional Institute and finally on October 3 of the same year it acquired its actual formalization as University of Magallanes. Since then, it legitimizes and consolidates its position as the only state institution of higher education in the Magallanes region, with a strong tradition in the Chilean university system and quality accreditation from the time when universities were summoned to participate in these processes at the country level. The University of Magallanes is a member of the Consortium of Universities of the State of Chile (Consorcio de Universidades del Estado de Chile, CUECH). Through this affiliation, the university actively contributes to strengthening public higher education, with a focus on regional development, scientific research in Antarctic and sub-Antarctic studies, and inclusive education. As part of the consortium, it engages in collaborative efforts to address national challenges and promote equitable access to knowledge across the country.

The Faculty of Engineering was one of the first to be created. The Faculty of Economics and Law was created in late 2002 as a result of academic reorganization of the former Faculty of Humanities and Social Sciences.

More recently, the Faculty of Health Sciences and the Faculty of Education and Social Sciences were created in May 2014, as a result of the reorganization of the former Faculty of Humanities, Social Sciences and Health. The School of Medicine was established in January 2014 being Dr. Marcelo Navarrete Signorile its founding director.

== Curriculum innovation and the Bologna process ==
In 2004 the ALFA Tuning Latin America Project aimed to 'fine tune' the educational structures that exist in Latin America, initiating a debate whose aim were to identify and improve co-operation between higher education institutions, so as to develop excellence, effectiveness, and transparency. This was an independent project, promoted and coordinated by universities in many different countries, both Latin American and European.

Since 2008 to date, the university started a process of curriculum redesign to focus on competences, skills development and learning outcomes. During the redesign process the university ascribed to the Credit Transfer and Accumulation System for its graduate and postgraduate courses. As to 2015 80% of the courses are redesigned and denominated in credits.
