= University of Antofagasta =

Coordinates: 23.6691°S 70.4056°W

- Universidad de Antofagasta
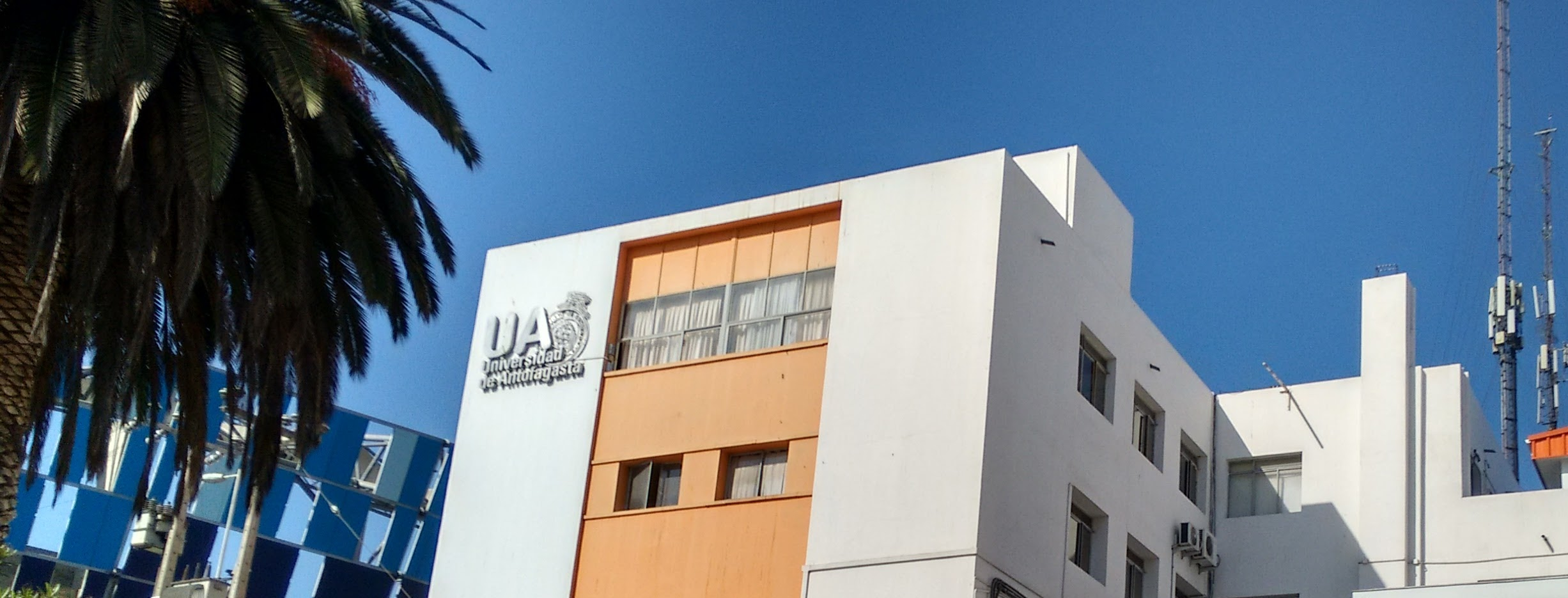
- University of Antofagasta seal
- Motto: Luz y vida en el desierto
- Type: Public
- Established: 20 March 1981; 45 years ago
- Location: Antofagasta, Chile
- Website: http://www.uantof.cl/

The University of Antofagasta (also referred to as UA) is a public research university located in Antofagasta, Chile. It is a derivative university part of the Chilean Traditional Universities.

== History ==
The university was formed in 1981 via the fusion of two regional campuses of the nationwide state universities Universidad de Chile and Universidad Tecnica del Estado.

The University was founded as an extension of the mining education imparted in the region since the nineteenth century. Its objectives have been to create, promote and divulge the region's scientific, technological, cultural and artistical advancements.

The University of Antofagasta is a member of the Consortium of Universities of the State of Chile (Consorcio de Universidades del Estado de Chile, CUECH), a network that brings together the country's public universities. As part of this consortium, the university collaborates in initiatives aimed at strengthening public higher education, promoting academic cooperation, and contributing to national development through research, teaching, and public service.
