= Diego Portales University =

University in Chile

Coordinates: 33.44995°S 70.66168°W

- Other name: UDP
- Motto: "Tradition, Innovation, Pluralism"
- Type: Private
- Established: 1982
- Rector: Carlos Peña
- Faculty: 1,331
- Students: 17,628
- Undergraduates: 16,269
- Postgraduates: 1,359
- Location: Santiago, Chile
- Campus: Urban
- Website: www.udp.cl

Diego Portales University (Spanish: Universidad Diego Portales, UDP) is one of the first private universities founded in Chile and is named after the Chilean statesman Diego Portales.

UDP has campuses in the Barrio Universitario de Santiago and Huechuraba.

== History ==
Universidad Diego Portales (UDP) was founded in 1982. It was an initiative of the founders of the Professional Institute of Sales and Advertising (IPEVE), which had been founded in 1963 and at that time had existed for almost 20 years.

In 1983, the university embarked on its academic programme with the creation of three faculties: the Faculty of Law, the Faculty of Administrative Sciences, and the Faculty of Psychology. In 1989, two new faculties were created: the Faculty of Information and Communications and the Faculty of Engineering Sciences.

In 1991, the university decided to undergo the process of national accreditation with the aim of attaining the status of Autonomous University.

On March 18, 1993, the Superior Council for Education, in plenary session, ratified that Universidad Diego Portales had successfully fulfilled its institutional mission, and designated it as having "Full Institutional Autonomy", authorizing it to bestow all categories of academic degree and title independently. Since 1993, the university has consolidated and expanded its academic programme.

In 1994, degree courses in Advertising and Design were transferred from IPEVE to Universidad Diego Portales, and the Bachelor of Arts degree programme was introduced. In 1999, the Faculty of Architecture, Design and Fine Arts was created and the Faculty of Humanities founded.

In 2002, Universidad Diego Portales created new programs and expanded into two new fields of knowledge: Health and Education. That same year, UDP designed a plan for long-term infrastructure growth, involving the issue of a Security Bond guaranteed by the World Bank for approximately US$25 million; it was the first educational institution to use this type of financing.

In 2004, Universidad Diego Portales became one of the first private universities to achieve institutional accreditation as a university from the National Undergraduate Accreditation Commission (CNAP) in three areas: Institutional Management, Undergraduate Teaching, and Equipment and Infrastructure.

== Academic schools and programs ==
Universidad Diego Portales offers 31 undergraduate programs in daytime and evening formats at its faculties.

- Faculty of Architecture, Art and Design, undergraduate programs in Architecture, Art and Design.
- Faculty of Communications and Letters: Journalism, Advertising and Creative Literature.
- Faculty of Economics and Business: Commercial Engineering, Engineering in Finance, Engineering in Marketing, Business Administration, Management Accounting and Public Accounting.
- Faculty of Engineering and Sciences: Industrial Civil Engineering, Informatics and Telecommunications Civil Engineering, Civil Construction Engineering, Construction Engineering, Informatics and Management Engineering, and Industrial Engineering and Logistics Management.
- Faculty of Health Sciences: Medicine, Odontology, Nursing and Medical Technology.
- Faculty of Humanities and Education: Psychology, Pedagogy in General Primary Education and Pedagogy in Infant Education.
- Faculty of History and Social Sciences: Bachelor of Social Sciences, Sociology, Political Science and History.
- Faculty of Law, the degree in law.

There are 11,877 registered undergraduate students and more than 1,000 graduate students, and the university has more than 16,000 alumni.

Additionally, the university offers postgraduate programmes.

The Faculty of Education and Humanities runs

- Master of Psychology programmes specializing in Social Psychology, Theoretical and Clinical Psychoanalysis, Clinical Psychology specializing in Family and Couples Therapy, and Cognitive Development specializing in Dynamic Learning Propensity Assessment Device; * postgraduate courses in Clinical Psychoanalysis specializing in Adults, Clinical Psychology: Specialist in Transpersonal Humanist Psychotherapy, Psychomotricity, Specialist in Juvenile-Infant Clinical Psychology; specialist programmes in Education (Language and Communication, English as a Foreign Language, Artistic Education, Mathematical Education, Nature Study, Social Studies and Physical Education); and
- diplomas in Juridical and Forensic Psychology and an International Diploma in Sports Psychology.

The Faculty of Health Sciences, in conjunction with the IberoAmerican University Foundation, offers an International master's degree in Nutrition and Dietetics, and a postgraduate degree in Nutrition and Applied Dietetics.

The Faculty of Communications and Letters offers a programme leading to an International master's degree in communication and an International Diploma in Management Communication.

The Faculty of Law offers master's degrees in Infant–Adolescent and Family Law, Constitutional Law and Public Institutions, and Criminal Law and the Penal Process; and postgraduate courses in Family Mediator Training.

Through their Graduate Schools, the Faculties of Economics and Business and the Faculty of Engineering have jointly developed an MBA programme, offered as a dual degree with Universitat Pompeu Fabra, with specializations in Finance, Human Resources, Strategic Communication, Marketing and Quality Control. They also offer a Master in Finance and master's programmes in Educational Management, Organizational Development and Behaviour, Information Technology Management, Systems Administration and Business Administration.

The Humanities Institute offers a master's degree programme in Contemporary Thought and a diploma in Contemporary Thought.

In 2005, there were 9959 registered postgraduate students.

== International relations and agreements ==
UDP has alliances and agreements with universities, research centres, foundations and overseas organizations in more than 25 countries.

UDP maintains agreements with 120 universities from countries such as Argentina, Australia, Belgium, Bolivia, Brazil, Canada, Colombia, Costa Rica, Ecuador, Egypt, El Salvador, Finland, France, Germany, Honduras, Italy, Mexico, Nicaragua, Panama, Paraguay, Peru, Poland, Puerto Rico, Romania, Russia, Spain, the United States, and Venezuela.

== Research and knowledge production ==
UDP has implemented a programme of research and knowledge production oriented towards finding solutions to national problems of high public impact.

The Centre for Juridical Research of the Faculty of Law has contributed to the Penal Procedures Reform implemented throughout the country. Two other centres, the Cognitive Development Centre of the Faculty of Humanities and Education and the Journalism and Advertising Research Centre (CIPP) of the Faculty of Communication and Letters, run programmes of public interest in the areas of cognitive development, community strengthening and the role of the communications media in society.

The Humanities Institute and the Social Sciences Research Institute have also undertaken multidisciplinary research programmes oriented towards national issues.

The university has carried out 21 programmes with external financing from the National Fund for Scientific and Technological Development (FONDECYT), the Fund for the Development of Art and Culture (FONDART), the Bicentennial Programme of the National Council for Science and Technology (CONACYT), the Ministry of Planning and Cooperation (MIDEPLAN), the Ministry of Education (MINEDUC), the United Nations Development Programme and the National Council for Narcotics Control (UNDP-CONACE), and the European Commission's 6th Marco Programme, in the fields of Education, Psychology, Health, Law, Social Sciences, Humanities and Engineering. In addition, more than 25 research projects have been financed internally.

Members of the academic staff published more than 50 articles in ISI-indexed publications from 2005 to June 2006.

An Astronomy Nucleus was formed in 2013 as part of the Faculty of Engineering and Sciences. It performs research in areas ranging from protoplanetary disks and extrasolar planets to supernovae, active galactic nuclei, and high redshift galaxies. The group focuses on observational astronomy, performing observations at X-ray, optical, infrared, and submillimeter/radio wavelengths. Its research programs use telescopes located in the north of Chile as well as space-based observatories.

== Accreditation ==
The university's institutional accreditation from the National Undergraduate Accreditation Committee (CNAP) for 2008 to 2013 covered the following areas:

- Institutional Management
- Undergraduate Teaching
- Infrastructure and Equipment

== Infrastructure ==
Through its Infrastructural Plan, UDP has established a presence in the centre of Santiago, with buildings covering an area of 94,582 square metres that serve its university community.

The project was designed by a team of architects from the academic staff of the university's Faculty of Architecture, Art and Design. With this project, UDP has the largest student infrastructure in the University District of Santiago, designed around the life of its students and supporting their academic, sporting and social activities.

UDP built facilities for its economics faculty and postgraduate programmes in "Ciudad empresarial", a business area in the north of Santiago, as well as a new central library in downtown Santiago.

- Built-up area: 94,582 square metres
- Total land surface area of grounds: 61,341 square metres
- Surface area of laboratories: 5,000 square metres
- Number of laboratories: 28
- Clinical Departments in the Health Faculty: 33
- Surface area of Computation Facilities: 430 square metres
- Number of computers available: 1,396
- Number of undergraduate students: 11,877 (day and night school)
- Places per year in 2008: approximately 2,300
- Alumni network: 29,667 graduates

=== Academic staff ===
- 1,331 professors
- PhDs: 132
- Master's degrees: 389
- Licentiates and technicians: 810

=== Library system ===
- Number of libraries: 11
- Number of library books: 106,114
- Number of texts in libraries: 55,662

=== Scholarships awarded ===
- Total: 1,923
- Internal: 1,835
- External: 88

=== Research ===
- Professors participating in research projects: 149
- Institute for Scientific Information (ISI) Publications (to date): 200
- Scientific Electronic Library Online (SciELO) Publications (to date): 90

==== Projects (2005–2006) ====
- Number of projects financed internally (to date): 131
- Number of projects with external financing (to date): 65
- National Fund for Scientific and Technological Development (FONDECYT) Projects awarded: 37
- Total UDP projects (main institution): 206
