= University of Valparaíso =

University in Chile

- Universidad de Valparaíso
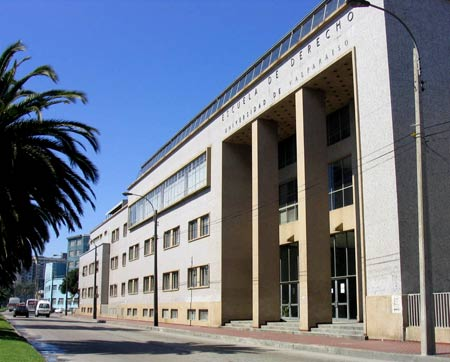
- University of Valparaíso Law School
- Type: Public
- Established: 1981
- Affiliations: CRUCH, CUE
- Rector: Osvaldo Corrales
- Academic staff: 1,210
- Students: 15,994
- Undergraduates: 15,392 (2020)
- Postgraduates: 602
- Location: Valparaíso, Chile; 33°02′38″S 71°37′03″W
- Website: www.uv.cl

The University of Valparaíso (UV) is a state public university in Chile, with its headquarters and the majority of its campuses in the city of Valparaíso. It has several other campuses in the Valparaíso Region and in Santiago, which is 100 km from Valparaiso.

Taking its current name as an autonomous university on February 12, 1981, UV is heir to the most longstanding higher education tradition in Valparaiso and its region.

As the major Pacific port south of San Francisco, Valparaiso was an important centre of business in the nineteenth century. Formal studies in law began there in 1878. By 1911, teaching had evolved into Chile's first regional School of Law, part of the national University of Chile (UCH, which in turn can trace its origins back through two colonial universities to 1622, some 82 years after the Spanish began their colonisation of today's central Chile).

Two private universities would form in Valparaiso in the 1920s and 1930s—what would become Universidad Técnica Federico Santa María (UTFSM, or USM) and Pontificia Universidad Católica de Valparaíso (PUCV, or UCV)—as state-backed higher education was also consolidated under the aegis of the national Universidad de Chile system.

In 1972, public university education in Valparaiso was organized as a Seat (Sede) of UCH; UV inherited all of this except for the Teaching Institute, which would eventually become the basis of the Universidad de Playa Ancha. On February 12, 1981 the University of Valparaiso adopted its present name and autonomous form. The creation of public regional universities was an important component of the economic reforms undertaken under the military rule that lasted until 1990.

UV is one of sixteen members of the Consortium of Universities of the State of Chile. All of these took their more or less current structure following a decision to divide the Universidad de Chile and the State Technical University into autonomous entities. UV and all state universities are among the 25 members of Chile's Council of University Rectors ("CRUCH"); these 25 are often referred to as the "traditional" universities, as opposed to the other "new private" universities. UV is also in the Grouping of Regional Universities of Chile, all of whose members are public and have been discussed (in English) together as public regional universities.

Higher education contributing much to its economy, Valparaiso is Chile's "college town". Three other traditional universities are based in Valparaiso – UTFSM, PUCV and "Universidad de Playa Ancha" (UPLA) – all of these are organized more in a "campus" style than UV, although Católica has departments strewn throughout the city and branch campuses in the region. UV's various faculties and schools form a university quarter the length of the plain (plano) of central Valparaiso, between the main UPLA campus in the south and in the north the main PUVC building.

Since January 2021 the rector of the university has been Osvaldo Corrales.
