= Arturo Prat University =

Coordinates: 20°14′37″S 70°08′29″W

Universidad Arturo Prat
- Motto: La única manera de que el pueblo alcance su libertad es con educación (The only way in which a people reaches its liberty it with education)
- Type: Public
- Established: 1984
- Affiliations: Chilean Traditional Universities, es:Consorcio de Universidades Estatales de Chile (CUE)
- Rector: Alberto Martinez
- Students: 11,985
- Undergraduates: 10,987
- Postgraduates: 908
- Location: Avenida Arturo Prat #2120, Iquique, Chile
- Website: www.unap.cl

Universidad Arturo Prat is a university in Chile. It is a derivative university part of the Chilean Traditional Universities.

The university was created in 1981 from the former campus of the University of Chile in Iquique. It also has campuses in Arica, Calama, Santiago and Victoria
