= University of Aysén =

Public university in Chile

- Universidad de Aysén
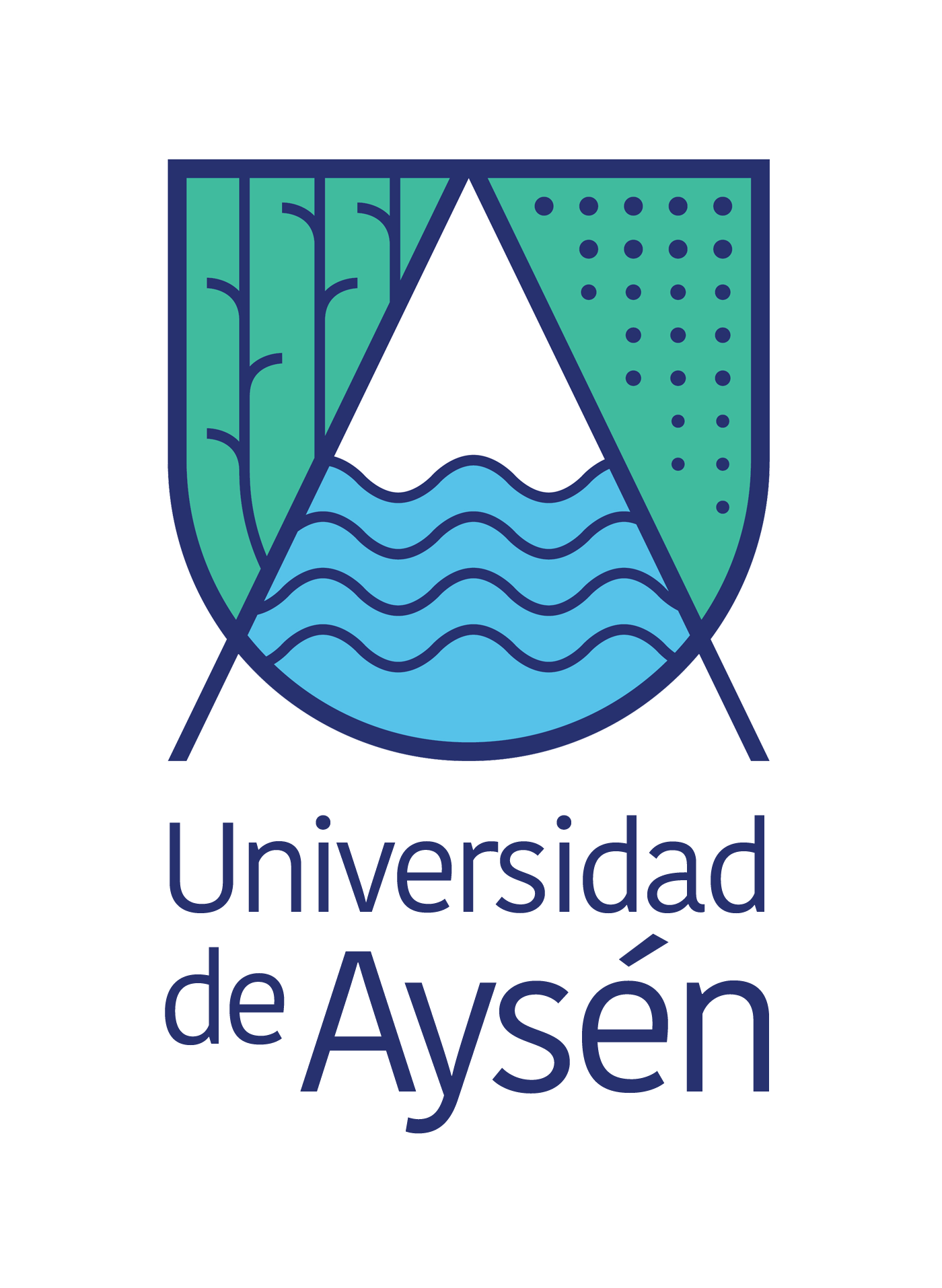
- Type: Public
- Established: 2015; 11 years ago
- Affiliations: Chilean Traditional Universities, es:Consorcio de Universidades Estatales de Chile (CUE)
- Rector: Enrique Urra
- Location: Coyhaique, Region of Aysén, Chile; 45.5707°S 72.0756°W
- Website: uaysen.cl

The University of Aysén (Universidad de Aysén) is a Chilean state university, created by law in 2015, during the second government of President Michelle Bachelet, along with the University of O'Higgins. It is located in the Aysén Region. It began its operations in March 2017.

Along with the University of O'Higgins, it is the first state university to be created in Chile in more than two decades, the last created in 1993. O'Higgins and Aysén were the only Chilean regions where no campuses of University of Chile or the Technical State University (UTE) were created, which were converted to "regional universities" beginning in 1981, and they were until 2015 the only regions without their own state universities.
