= University of O'Higgins =

Public university in Chile

- Universidad de O'Higgins
- Type: Public
- Established: 2015
- Affiliations: Chilean Traditional Universities, es:Consorcio de Universidades Estatales de Chile (CUE)
- Rector: Fernanda Kri Amar
- Students: 5,030 (2022)
- Location: Av. Libertador Bernardo O'Higgins 611, Rancagua, Region of O'Higgins, Chile; 34.1645°S 70.7417°W
- Website: uoh.cl

The University of O'Higgins (UOH) (Universidad de O'Higgins) is a Chilean state university, created by law in 2015, during the second government of President Michelle Bachelet, along with the University of Aysén. It is located in the Region of Libertador General Bernardo O'Higgins. It began its operations in March 2017.

Along with the University of Aysén, it is the first state university to be created in Chile in more than two decades, the last created in 1993. O'Higgins and Aysén were the only Chilean regions where no campuses of University of Chile or the Technical State University (UTE) were created, which were converted to "regional universities" beginning in 1981, and so were until 2015 the only regions without their own state universities.
