= University of Talca =

University based in Talca, Chile

Coordinates: 35.4054°S 71.6331°W

- Universidad de Talca
- Type: Public
- Established: October 1981
- Rector: Carlos Torres Fuchslocher
- Academic staff: 721 (2018)
- Administrative staff: 379 (2018)
- Students: 11,573 (2020)
- Undergraduates: 10,529
- Postgraduates: 1,044
- Location: Talca, Region del Maule, Chile
- Campuses: 5 (Talca, Curicó, Santiago, Linares, Santa Cruz)
- Colours: Crimson
- Nicknames: Utal; UTalca
- Website: www.utalca.cl

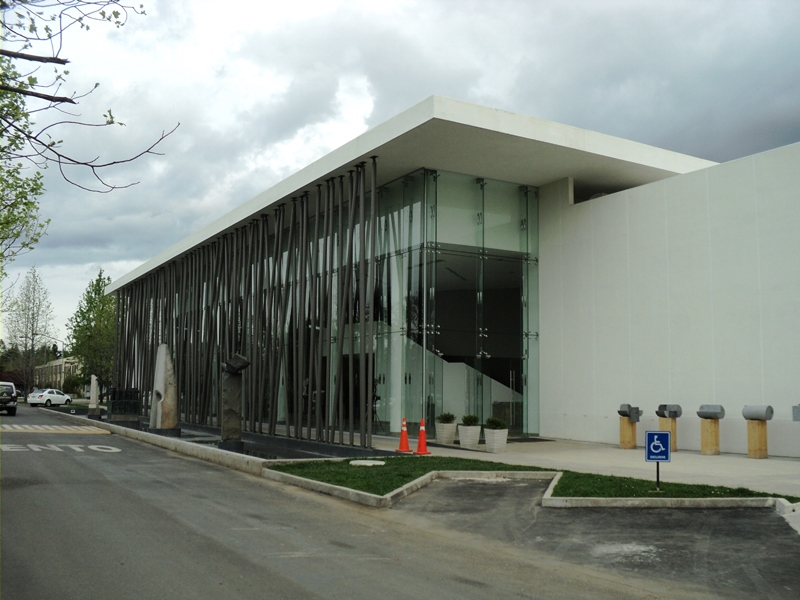
National museum of sculpture. Campus Talca, University of Talca.

The University of Talca (Spanish: Universidad de Talca) is a Chilean university. It has five campuses, located in Talca, Curicó, Linares, Santa Cruz and Santiago. The Talca campus is the university's headquarters and largest campus. It is part of the Chilean Traditional Universities, the Consortium of Universities of the State of Chile and the Group of Regional Universities of Chile.

University of Talca is considered as the best public university outside Santiago by various rankings. It offers ten PhD programs and 27 Master programs. It was accredited for five years (2014-2019) by the Comisión Nacional de Acreditación (National Accreditation Commission).

== History ==
The Universidad de Talca was founded in 1981, upon the fusion of the seats in Talca of the Universidad de Chile and the Universidad Técnica del Estado. For this reason it is known in the Chilean system as a "derivative university". In 1998, the Faculty of Engineering was founded and established in the city of Curicó, 60 km north of Talca. The university has expanded to other cities in recent years: Santiago in 2005, where a new campus was inaugurated in 2013, a Technological Institute in Santa Cruz in 2007, and a campus in Linares, in 2017.

== Campuses ==
The university has five campuses.

=== Talca ===
Located in northern Talca, it is the largest university campus, with an extension of more than 90 hectares. It hosts the buildings of the faculties of Health Sciences, Agricultural Sciences, Economics and Business Sciences and Law and Social Sciences. Other Institutes, Schools, Vice-Presidencies, Technological Centers and various other agencies and administrative services are distributed in the campus as well. Here are also found a Sculptures Park, including part of the National Museum of Sculpture, and the Botanical Garden (6.5 hectares).

=== Curicó ===
It is located in the Los Niches sector, to the South-East of the city of Curicó, 50 km north of Talca, and concentrates the programs of the Department of Engineering: Industrial Civil Engineering (day and evening), Computer Sciences Civil Engineering, Mechanical Technical Engineering, Mechatronics Engineering, Construction Engineering and Civil Engineering in Mines. Postgraduate programs are also offered.

=== Santiago ===
The Santiago Campus emerged as a space to promote the development of graduate programs of academic excellence and to train highly qualified human resources. In its building at 415 Quebec Street, Providencia district, are located the study premises attached to the Department of Law and Social Sciences and to the Business School, various graduate programs are taught and an exhibition gallery operates. On the new campus building at 2222 Santa Elena, the undergraduate programs are concentrated: Auditing and Control Management Engineering, Business Engineering, Law and Political Sciences and Public Administration.

=== Santa Cruz ===
It is located in the city of Santa Cruz and was created by the joint effort of a group of businessmen from the O'Higgins Region and the Universidad de Talca to develop a project linked to the needs of regional development. It is an academic unit devoted to training Professional Technicians, continuing education for professional and research and development for the regional and national productive sector in strategic areas related to the wine industry.

=== Linares ===
It was inaugurated in 2017 and it host the Faculty of Education Sciences and offers also the undergraduate program on Public Auditor-Accountant. Its facilities span an area of 6,300 square meters.

== Faculties and schools ==
The university has nine faculties, three schools and six institutes.

=== Faculties ===
- Faculty of Architecture, Design and Music
- Faculty of Forest Sciences
- Faculty of Agricultural Sciences
- Faculty of Economics and Business
- Faculty of Education Sciences
- Faculty of Health Sciences
- Faculty of Law and Social Sciences
- Faculty of Engineering
- Faculty of Psychology

=== Schools ===
- School of Architecture, created by Juan Román Pérez in 1998. He founded an innovating pedagogy, connecting architecture and territory, awarded a Global Award for Sustainable Architecture in 2015.
- School of Design
- School of German Pedagogy
- School of Music

=== Institutes ===
- Institute of Cell Biology and Biotechnology
- Institute of Mathematics
- Institute of Educational Research and Development
- Institute of Chemistry of Natural Resources
- Institute of Humanist Studies "Juan Ignacio Molina"
- Technological Institute Colchagua

== Rankings ==
University rankings

Global – Overall
- QS World: 801-1000
- THE World: 801-1000

In 2017, Times Higher Education ranked the university within the 801-1000 band globally and 31-35 in Latin America.

In the 2018 QS World University Rankings is ranked 801-1000 globally, 101-150 for under 50 universities and 79 in Latin America.
