= University of Los Lagos =

Public university in Chile

Coordinates: 40°35′13.8″S 73°05′20.99″W

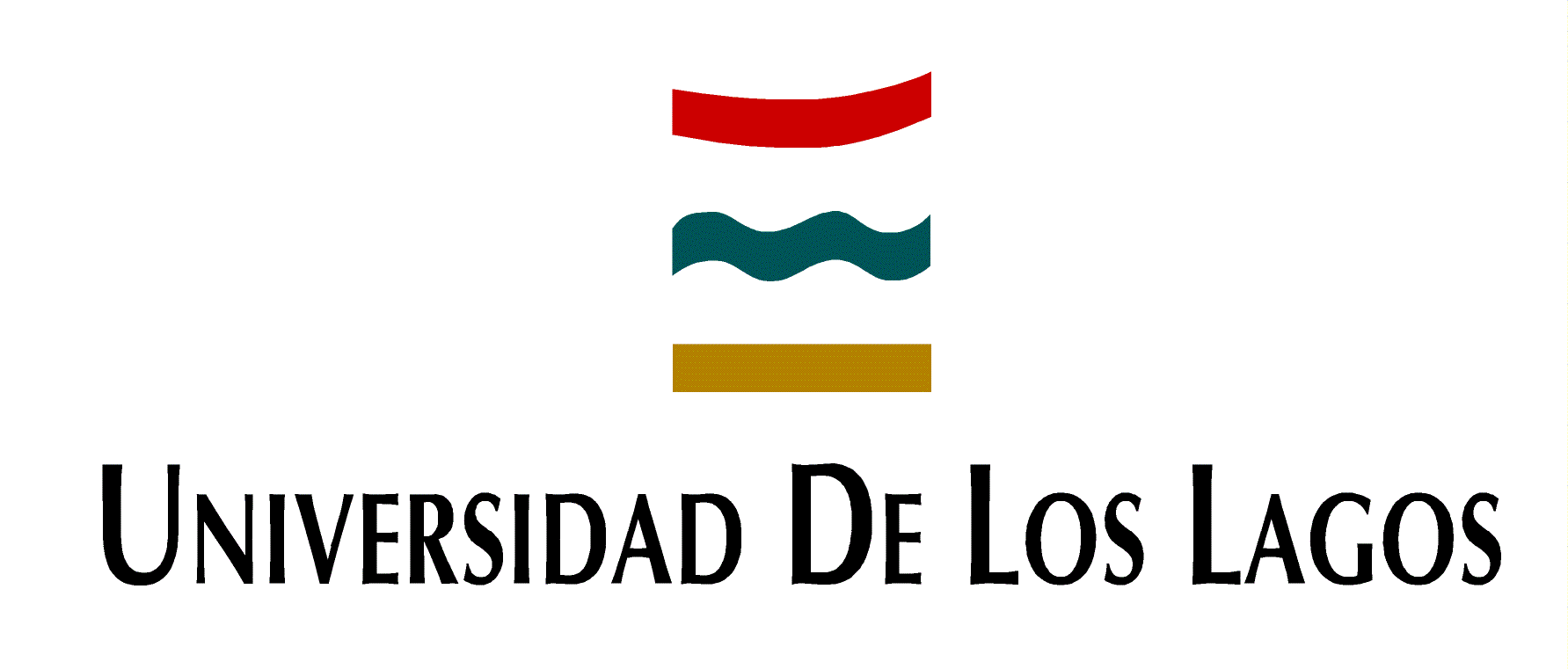

The University of Los Lagos (Spanish: Universidad de Los Lagos) is a university in Chile. It is a derivative university part of the Chilean Traditional Universities. It currently operates various campuses: the main campus in Osorno and others in Ancud, Castro and Puerto Montt.
