= University of Atacama =

University in Copiapó, Atacama, Chile

Coordinates: 27°21′24″S 70°21′09″W

- Universidad de Atacama
- Type: Public
- Established: October 26, 1981 (44 years ago) (Escuela de Minas de Copiapó founded in 1857)
- President: Celso Arias Mora
- Faculty: 194 (2013)
- Students: 6,805
- Undergraduates: 6,661 (2020)
- Postgraduates: 144
- Location: Copiapó, Chile
- Campus: Campus Cordillera Campus Paulino del Barrio Campus Rómulo J. Peña Campus Medicina
- Website: www.uda.cl

University of Atacama (Spanish: Universidad de Atacama) or UDA is a university in Chile. It is part of the Chilean Traditional Universities. UDA is in Copiapó, in the Third Region, Atacama.

The university was created in 1981, as a fusion of the old Mines School of Copiapo, founded in 1857 and very prestigious in the mineral industries. This school was integrated in 1947 in early founded Universidad Técnica del Estado, being the new U.T.E. until 1981 the most important Chilean university in applied sciences and the Normal School of Copiapó, founded in 1905.

UDA has four faculties: Humanities and Education, Law, Engineering, and Natural Sciences, as well as five institutes: the Technological Institute, the Language Institute, the Center for Technical Education (CFT), the Institute for Scientific and Technological Research (IDITEC), and INSAMIN.

The University of Atacama campus houses several historical monuments, including the first steam engine to traverse Chile, between Copiapó and the port city of Caldera, in 1851.
