= Order of precedence =

Sequential hierarchy of nominal importance of persons

An order of precedence is a sequential hierarchy of importance applied to individuals, groups, or organizations. For individuals, it is most often used for diplomats in attendance at very formal occasions. It can also be used in the context of medals, decorations, and awards.

A person's position in an order of precedence is not necessarily an indication of functional importance, but rather an indication of ceremonial or historical relevance; for instance, it may dictate where dignitaries are seated at formal dinners. The term is occasionally used to mean the order of succession—to determine who replaces the head of state in the event they are removed from office or incapacitated—as this order often correlates with importance.

Universities and the professions often have their own rules of precedence applying locally, based (for example) on university or professional rank, each rank then being ordered within itself on the basis of seniority (i.e. date of attaining that rank). Within an institution, the officials of that institution are likely to rank much higher in the order than in a general order of precedence—the chancellor or president of a university may well precede anyone except a head of state, for example. The same might be true for a mayor in their own city.

== Orders of precedence by country ==
What follows are the general orders of precedence for different countries for state purposes, such as diplomatic dinners. These are made under the assumption that such functions are held in the capital; when they are held in another city or region, local officials such as governors would be much higher up the order. There may also be more specific and local orders of precedence, for particular occasions or within particular institutions.

=== People ===
- Argentine order of precedence
- Australian order of precedence
- Barbadian order of precedence
- Belgian order of precedence
- Bangladesh order of precedence
- Brazilian order of precedence
- Canadian order of precedence
- Catholic Church order of precedence
- Chilean order of precedence
- Chinese order of precedence
  - Hong Kong order of precedence
- Colombian order of precedence
- Danish order of precedence
- French order of precedence
- German order of precedence
- Greek order of precedence
- Indian order of precedence
- Indonesian order of precedence
- Republic of Ireland order of precedence
- Israeli order of precedence
- Italian order of precedence
- Jamaican order of precedence
- Kazakh order of precedence
- Liechtenstein order of precedence
- Japanese order of precedence
- Malaysian order of precedence
- New Zealand order of precedence
- Nepalese order of precedence
- Norwegian order of precedence
- Philippine order of precedence
- Polish order of precedence
- Portuguese order of precedence
- Romanian order of precedence
- Singapore order of precedence
- Spanish order of precedence
- South Korean order of precedence
- Sri Lankan order of precedence
- Swedish order of precedence
- Swiss order of precedence
- Thai order of precedence
- Turkish order of precedence
- United Kingdom order of precedence
  - England and Wales order of precedence
  - Scottish order of precedence
- United States order of precedence

=== Decorations and medals ===
- Australian honours order of wearing
- Belgian honours order of wearing
- Canadian honours order of wearing
- German honours order of wearing
- Indian military decorations order of wearing
- New Zealand honours order of wearing
- Pakistan military decorations order of wearing
- Polish honours order of wearing
- South African military decorations order of wearing
- United Kingdom honours order of wearing
- United States military decorations order of wearing
  - Texas military decorations order of wearing

== See also ==
- List of heads of state by diplomatic precedence
- Order of succession
- Precedence of Livery Companies in the City of London (UK)
- Protocol
- Style
- Precedence among European monarchies
- Kamiza – in the case of Japan
