= Pruna (surname) =

Pruna is a surname. Notable people with the surname include:

- Aldo Pruna Díaz (born 1983), Cuban canoeist
- Anna Pruna i Grivé (born 1968), Spanish sports executive and athlete
- Antoni Pruna López (born 1958), Spanish basketball player
- Domènec Pruna i Ozerans (born 1907–1974), Spanish filmmaker
- Pere Pruna i Ocerans (1904–1977), Spanish painter
- Ricard Pruna i Grivé (born 1964), Spanish physician and surgeon

== See also ==
- Cristina Mădălina Prună (born 1984), Romanian politician
