= Standing Bureau of the Chamber of Deputies of Romania =

The Standing Bureau of the Chamber of Deputies (Romanian: Biroul Permanent al Camerei Deputaţilor) consists of the President of the Chamber of Deputies, four vice-presidents, four secretaries, and four quaestors. The President of the Standing Bureau also serves as the President of the Chamber of Deputies. The President is elected, by secret ballot, for the duration of the legislative period. All the other members are elected at the beginning of each parliamentary session.

The functions are distributed through the political groups, respecting the proportions of the political composition of the Chamber.

At the moment, both Chambers of Parliament are constituted (the seats are validated, the Standing Bureau is elected, and the political groups elect their Bureaus). Until the procedures are completed, the session is conducted by the eldest Deputy (as President), aided by the two youngest Deputies (as Secretaries).

== Members ==
Last election of the leadership of the Chamber president: November 2021

Function	Name	Group	period
President	Marcel Ciolacu	PNL	23 November 2021–present
Vice-Presidents	Cristina Prună	USR-PLUS	21 December 2020–present
Vice-Presidents		PNL	21 December 2020–present
Vice-Presidents		PSD	21 December 2020–present
Vice-Presidents		PSD	21 December 2020–present
Secretaries	Oana Murariu	USR-PLUS	21 December 2020–present
Secretaries		PNL	21 December 2020–present
Secretaries		PSD	21 December 2020–present
Secretaries	Ovidiu Ganț	National Minorities	21 December 2020–present
Quaestors		PNL	21 December 2020–present
Quaestors	Sereș Deneș	UDMR	21 December 2020–present
Quaestors		PSD	21 December 2020–present
Quaestors		AUR	21 December 2020–present

== Political Groups Leaders ==
Although the leaders of the political groups are not members of the Standing Bureau, they have a key part in the leadership of the Chamber.

Political group	Constituent parties	Leader	Leader since - until
USR-PLUS	USR PLUS
PSD	Social Democratic Party
PNL	National Liberal Party
UDMR/RMDSZ	Democratic Alliance of Hungarians in Romania
National minorities	PR - "PE"; FDGR/DFDR; FCER; UDSCR; UBBR; UAR; UDDTR; USR; RO.AS.IT; UDTR; UUR; CRLR; UCR; UER; ALAR
AUR	AUR
