= Klaus Iohannis =

President of Romania from 2014 to 2025

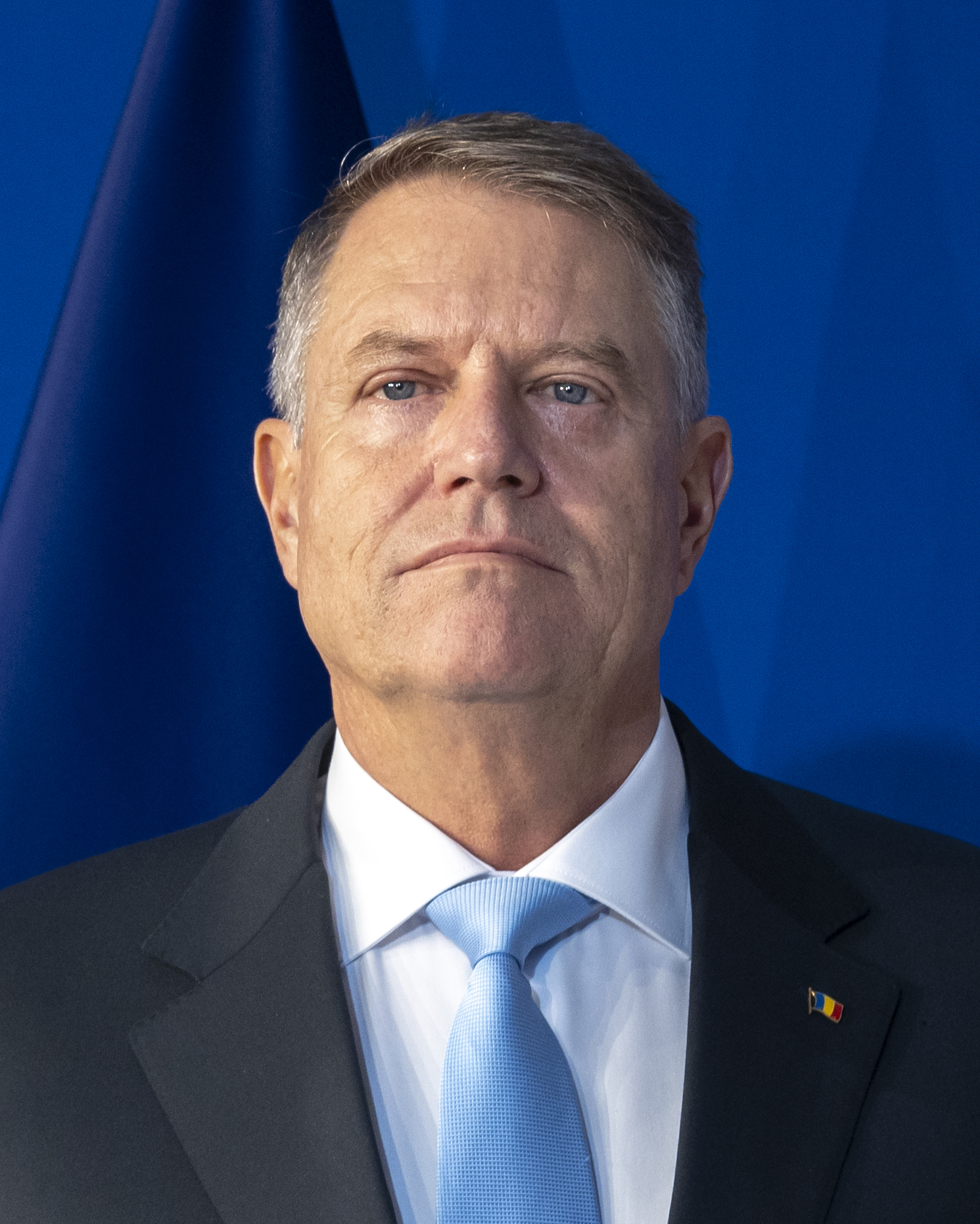
- Iohannis in 2024

President of Romania
- In office 21 December 2014 – 12 February 2025
- Prime Minister: See list: Victor Ponta Gabriel Oprea (acting) Sorin Cîmpeanu (acting) Dacian Cioloș Sorin Grindeanu Mihai Tudose Mihai Fifor (acting) Viorica Dăncilă Ludovic Orban Nicolae Ciucă (acting) Florin Cîțu Nicolae Ciucă Cătălin Predoiu (acting) Marcel Ciolacu
- Preceded by: Traian Băsescu
- Succeeded by: Nicușor Dan

Mayor of Sibiu
- In office 30 June 2000 – 2 December 2014
- Preceded by: Dan Condurat
- Succeeded by: Astrid Fodor

Leader of the National Liberal Party
- In office 28 June 2014 – 18 December 2014
- Preceded by: Crin Antonescu
- Succeeded by: Alina Gorghiu; Vasile Blaga

Leader of the Democratic Forum of Germans in Romania
- In office 2002–2013
- Preceded by: Eberhard Wolfgang Wittstock
- Succeeded by: Paul-Jürgen Porr

Personal details
- Born: Klaus Werner Iohannis; 13 June 1959 (age 67) Sibiu, Romanian People's Republic
- Party: Independent (since 2014)
- Other political affiliations: Democratic Forum of Germans in Romania (1990–2013); National Liberal Party (2013–2014)
- Spouse: Carmen Lăzurcă (m. 1989)
- Education: Babeș-Bolyai University (BSc)
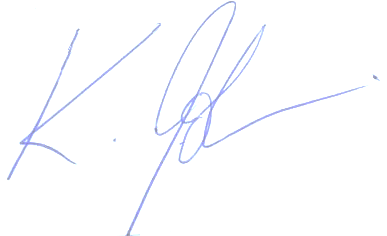
- Signature

Klaus Werner Iohannis (Note: Romanian pronunciation: [ˈkla.us ˈvernər joˈhanis]; German pronunciation: [ˈklaʊ̯s ˈvɛʁnɐ joˈhanɪs].) (born 13 June 1959) is a Romanian politician, physicist, and former teacher who served as the president of Romania from 2014 until his resignation in 2025. Prior to entering national politics, Iohannis was a physics teacher at the Samuel von Brukenthal National College in his native Sibiu where he eventually served as mayor from 2000 to 2014 before ascending to the presidency.

Iohannis was first elected the mayor of the Romanian town of Sibiu in 2000, on behalf of the Democratic Forum of Germans in Romania (FDGR/DFDR). Although the Transylvanian Saxon population of Sibiu had declined to a tiny minority by the early 2000s, he won a surprise victory and was re-elected by landslides in 2004, 2008, and 2012. He is credited with turning his home town into one of Romania's most popular tourist destinations. Sibiu was named the European Capital of Culture in 2007 alongside Luxembourg City.

In October 2009, four of the five political groups in the Parliament of Romania, excluding the Democratic Liberal Party (PDL) of then President Traian Băsescu, proposed Iohannis as a candidate for the office of Prime Minister of Romania; however, Băsescu refused to nominate him, despite Parliament's adoption of a declaration supporting his candidacy. He was again the candidate for Prime Minister of the PNL and the PSD in the elections in the same year. In February 2013, he became a member of the National Liberal Party (PNL), accepting an invitation from then liberal leader Crin Antonescu, and was immediately elected the party's first vice-president, eventually becoming the PNL president during the following year. Iohannis became the president of the National Liberal Party (PNL) in 2014, after previously serving as the leader of the Democratic Forum of Germans in Romania (FDGR/DFDR) between 2002 and 2013. He was elected president in that year's election, and then subsequently re-elected by a landslide in 2019.

Iohannis's second term was marked by democratic backsliding as well as a slight shift towards illiberalism and a more authoritarian style of government, especially after the 2021 political crisis and the formation of the National Coalition for Romania (CNR). He faced allegations of suppression of freedom of speech and press freedom. Furthermore, his approval ratings declined from April 2021 onwards as the electorate showed increasing disapproval of his political behaviour, favouring the Social Democratic Party (PSD) and rebuffing his former political allies (albeit several of them being solely conjunctural in the past) in the process. A survey from June 2023 showed that over 90% of Romanians did not trust Iohannis, with only 8% having a positive opinion on him. In 2023, the Economist Democracy Index ranked Romania last in the European Union (EU) in terms of democracy, even behind Viktor Orbán's Hungary. His term was extended due to the annulment of the 2024 presidential election, but he resigned in February 2025.

Ideologically a conservative, Iohannis is the first Romanian president belonging to an ethnic minority, as he is a Transylvanian Saxon, part of Romania's German minority, which settled in Transylvania from the High Middle Ages onward.

== Early life and professional career ==
Born in the old city centre of Sibiu to a Transylvanian Saxon family, Klaus Iohannis is the eldest child of Gustav Heinz and Susanne Johannis. He has a younger sister, Krista Johannis (born 1964). His father worked as a technician at a state-owned company, while his mother was a nurse. Both his parents as well as his sister emigrated from their native Sibiu/Hermannstadt to Würzburg, Bavaria in Germany in 1992, acquiring citizenship there under the right of return granted by the German nationality law, as most other Transylvanian Saxons after the fall of the Iron Curtain. However, he chose to live and work in Romania.

After graduating from the Faculty of Physics of the Babeș-Bolyai University (UBB) in Cluj-Napoca in 1983, Iohannis worked as a high school physics teacher at various schools and colleges in his native Sibiu, including, from 1989 to 1997, at the Samuel von Brukenthal National College, the oldest German-speaking school in Romania. From 1997 to 1999, he was Deputy General School Inspector of Sibiu County, and from 1999 until his election as mayor in 2000, he was the General School Inspector, head of public schools in the county.

== Political career ==
He joined the Democratic Forum of Germans in Romania (FDGR/DFDR) in 1990, and served as a member of its board of education in Transylvania from 1997, and a member of the local party board in Sibiu from 1998. In 2001, he was elected President of the Democratic Forum of Germans in Romania (FDGR/DFDR), succeeding former president Eberhard Wolfgang Wittstock.

=== Mayor of Sibiu ===
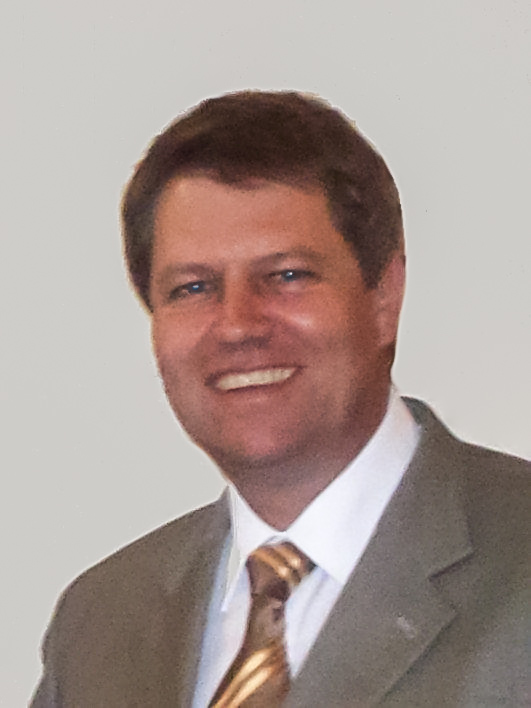
Iohannis as Mayor of Sibiu in May 2005

In 2000, the Democratic Forum of Germans in Romania in Sibiu (FDGS), the local chapter of the Democratic Forum of Germans (FDGR/DFDR), decided to back him as a candidate for mayor. While initially not wanting anything else than to represent the forum through a local candidate and to obtain a certain degree of local political visibility at that time, the leadership of FDGR/DFDR was surprised for his subsequent victory.

Despite the fact that Sibiu's German minority (represented, more specifically, by Transylvanian Saxons) had shrunken to a mere 1.6%, Iohannis was elected with 69.18% of the votes and has won three re-elections in a row, getting some of the largest electoral scores in the country: 88.69% of the vote in 2004, and 83.26% in 2008. Consequently, he became the third ethnic German mayor of a Romanian city since Albert Dörr and Hans Jung (who briefly served in 1941 in Timișoara), the former who had also served in Sibiu from 1906/07 to 1918 (the first was Otto Helmut Mayerhoffer, who served as elected mayor of the town of Roman in Neamț County, between 1992 and 1996).

Throughout his tenure as mayor, he has worked to restore the town's infrastructure and to tighten the local administration. Iohannis is also widely credited with turning his hometown into one of Romania's most popular tourist destinations thanks to the extensive renovation of the old downtown. During his first term, Iohannis worked with a town council which was formed by PDSR/PSD, FDGR/DFDR, PD, CDR, and PRM. Since 2004, during his second and third terms, his own party, FDGR/DFDR, had the majority. Between 2008 and 2012, FDGR/DFDR had 14 out of 23 councillors, PDL 4, PSD 3, and PNL only 2.

Iohannis established contacts with foreign officials and investors. Sibiu was declared the European Capital of Culture of 2007, along with Luxembourg (the bearer of the distinction in 1995). Luxembourg chose to share this honourable status with Sibiu due to the fact that many of the Transylvanian Saxons emigrated in the 12th century to Transylvania from the area where Luxembourg is today. Sibiu which was mainly built by the Transylvanian Saxons as early as the Middle Ages, was for many centuries the cultural centre of the German ethnic group in Transylvania, and was a predominantly German-speaking town until the mid 20th century. Subsequently, many Germans left the town after World War II, and especially in 1990, within months of the fall of the Iron Curtain.

On 7 November 2005, Iohannis was nominated as the "Personality of the Year for a European Romania" (Romanian: Personalitatea anului pentru o Românie europeană) by the Eurolink – House of Europe organisation.

=== Candidacy for Prime Minister, with PSD support ===
On 14 October 2009, the leaders of the opposition parliamentary groups (the National Liberal Party (PNL), the Social Democratic Party (PSD), the Democratic Alliance of Hungarians in Romania (UMR), the Conservative Party (PC) led by Dan Voiculescu, and the group of smaller ethnic minorities), proposed Iohannis as a candidate for the post of Prime Minister, after the government of PM Emil Boc fell a day before as a result of a motion of no confidence in the Parliament. Coming from outside the national-level politics of Romania, Iohannis had an image of an independent politician, although his party (i.e. the FDGR/DFDR) consistently allied itself with, and Iohannis campaigned in the prior European Parliament elections for, the National Liberals (PNL).

Subsequently, the PNL, PSD, UDMR, and the small ethnic minorities group in the Parliament presented Iohannis as their common candidate for Prime Minister of an interim government. On 14 October, Iohannis confirmed acceptance of his candidacy. However, on 15 October, President Traian Băsescu nominated Lucian Croitoru, a top Romanian economist, as prime minister, and charged the latter with forming the country's next government.

After the second round of negotiations, a day before Croitoru's nomination, Băsescu noted: "Some parties have proposed Klaus Iohannis. I would like you to know that I have not rejected the possibility for him to become Prime Minister, while my options would rather envisage other [national unity government] solutions. But I have rejected such a proposal because it comes from PSD or another party [PNL]", referring to the alleged legal constraint of only considering a proposal presented by the largest parliamentary faction, at the time the Liberal Democratic Party (PDL), a constraint disputed by the other parties, along with insisting that given the financial and economic crisis at that time, a PM needs to have experience in that field. The opposition criticised the President for not designating Iohannis. Social Democrat leader Mircea Geoană accused Băsescu of trying to influence the upcoming presidential elections by having them organised by a sympathetic government. Crin Antonescu, the leader of the National Liberals, vowed his party would derail other nominations but Iohannis's. After the nomination of Croitoru, Antonescu, a candidate in the presidential election, stated that he would nominate Iohannis as prime minister if elected president. Three days later, on 18 October, Geoană suggested Antonescu was trying to use Iohannis as an "electoral agent" for Antonescu's bid for president. In response, Antonescu told the press that Iohannis "is not the type of person that would let himself be used". Geoană and PSD leadership has held a second meeting with Iohannis in Bucharest in the evening of 18 October. UDMR, which the previous day announced it would also attend, declared in the morning that all their leaders were not in the city. PNL was present at the meeting with lower level representatives, after Antonescu announced in the morning that he was campaigning in Cluj On 21 October the Parliament adopted with 252 votes in favour (PSD, PNL, UDMR, and minorities groups) and 2 against a declaration requesting the President to nominate Iohannis as prime minister.

=== In the National Liberal Party (PNL) ===
On 20 February 2013, Iohannis joined the PNL, announcing this during a press conference with Crin Antonescu. At a PNL extraordinary congress, he was elected First Vice President of the Party. In the meeting of 28 June 2014, he was elected President of the PNL with 95% of the votes.

=== Candidacy for the President of Romania ===
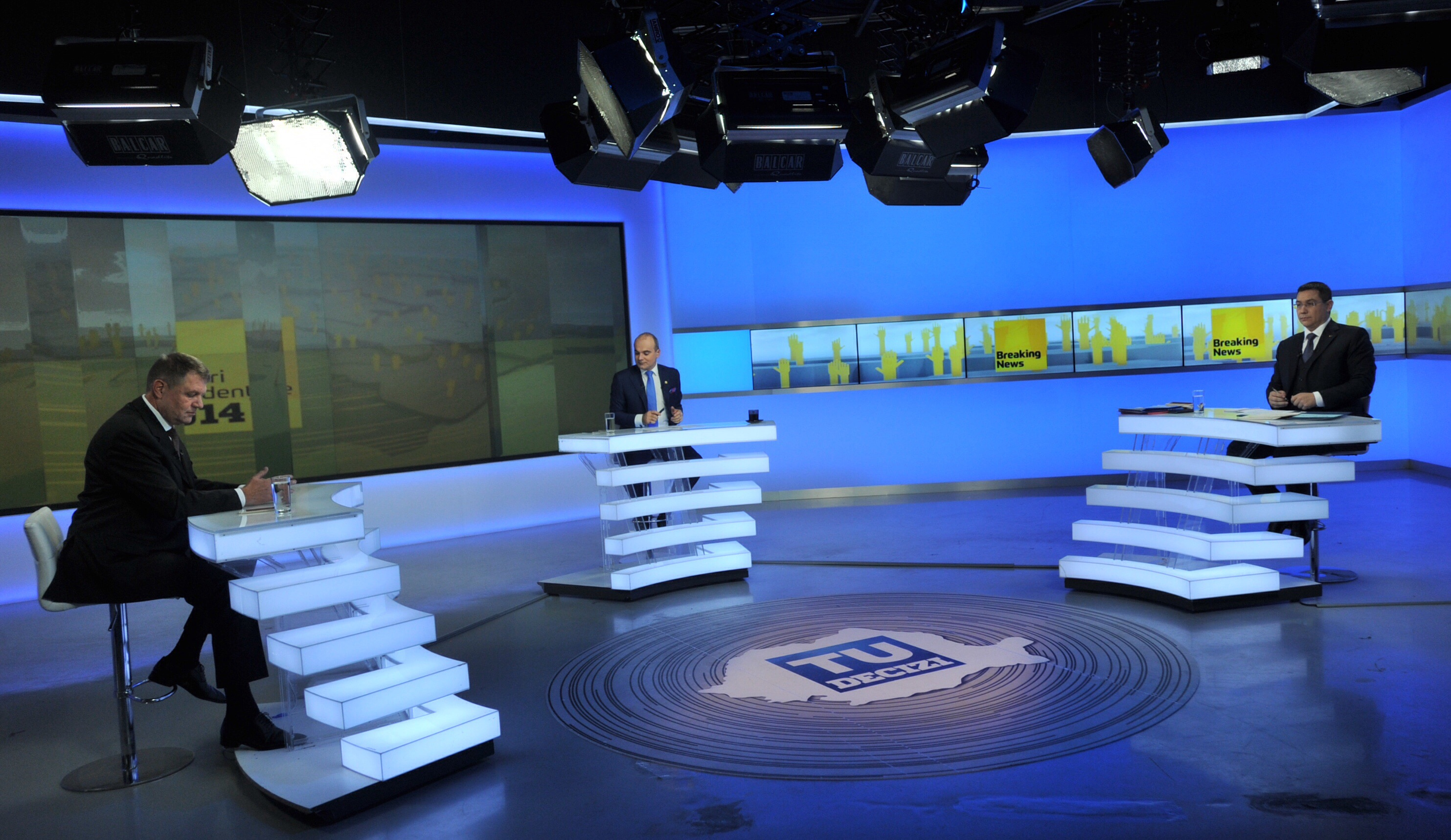
Iohannis and his PSD opponent (and former USL ally) Victor Ponta at a TV debate on Realitatea TV, 11 November 2014

In 2009, Iohannis had stated that he might possibly run for the office of President of Romania, although not in that year. In addition, former Prime Minister Călin Popescu-Tăriceanu also stated on 27 October 2009 and again on 23 April 2010 that he would like to see Iohannis become either Prime Minister or President of Romania sometime in the future.

PNL and PDL started in the summer of 2014 procedures to strengthen the political right. The two parties will eventually merge under the name PNL, but went for elections in an alliance: the Christian Liberal Alliance (Romanian: Alianța Creștin-Liberală). On 11 August the alliance chose Iohannis as its candidate for the presidential election in November and so he was registered as an official presidential candidate. In a late August 2014 interview, Iohannis described himself as a politruk who candidates for the presidency of Romania. He subsequently received 30.37% of the votes in the first round, finishing second and consequently qualifying for the second round. In the second round on 16 November he was elected President of Romania with 54.43% of the cast ballots.

== Presidency (2014–2025) ==
Presidential styles of Klaus Iohannis
- Reference style: Președintele (President)
- Spoken style: Președintele (President)
- Alternative style: Domnia Sa/Excelența Sa (His Excellency)

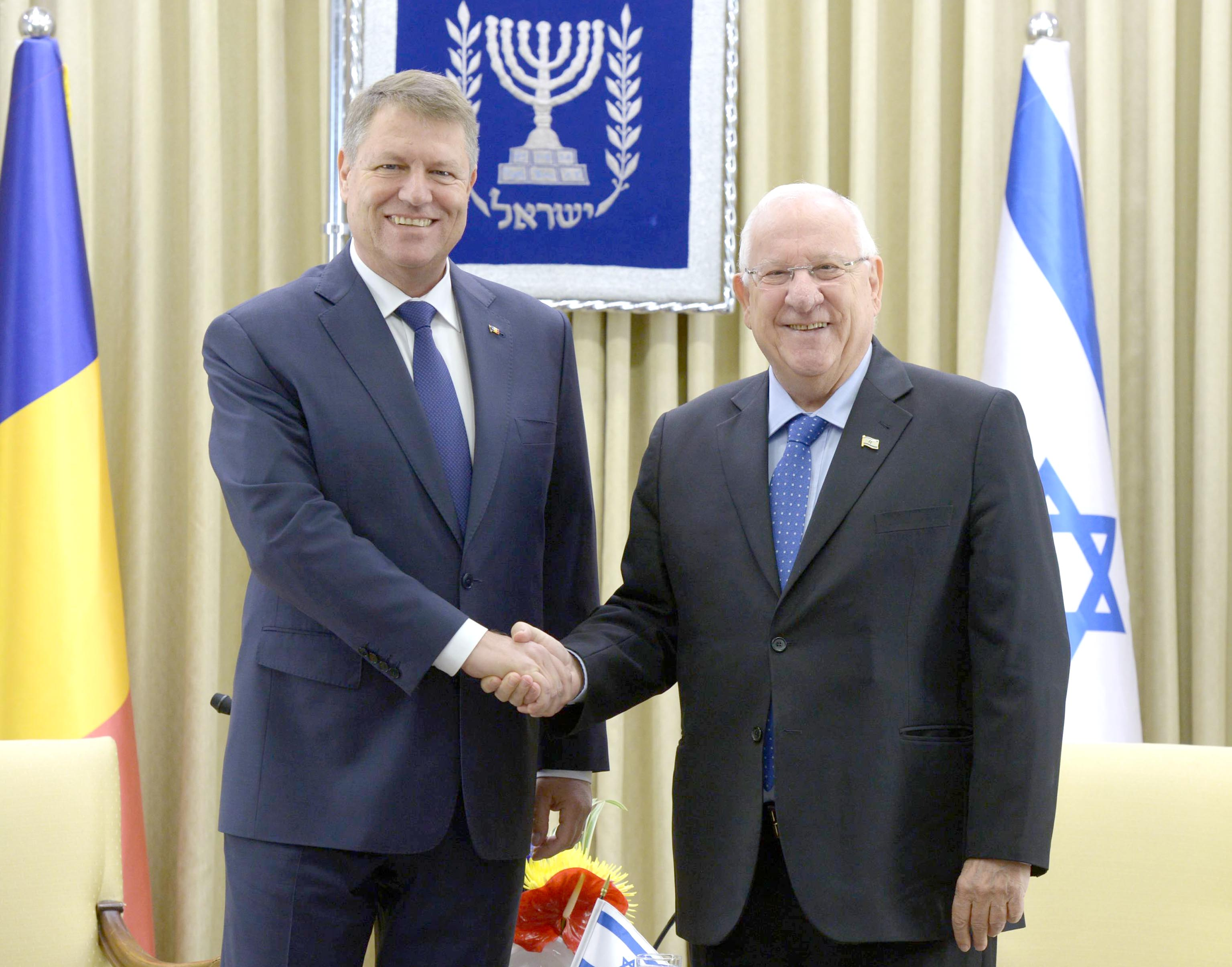
Iohannis with Israeli President Reuven Rivlin in March 2016

U.S. Secretary of State Rex Tillerson and Iohannis before their bilateral meeting at the U.S. Department of State in Washington, D.C., on 9 June 2017

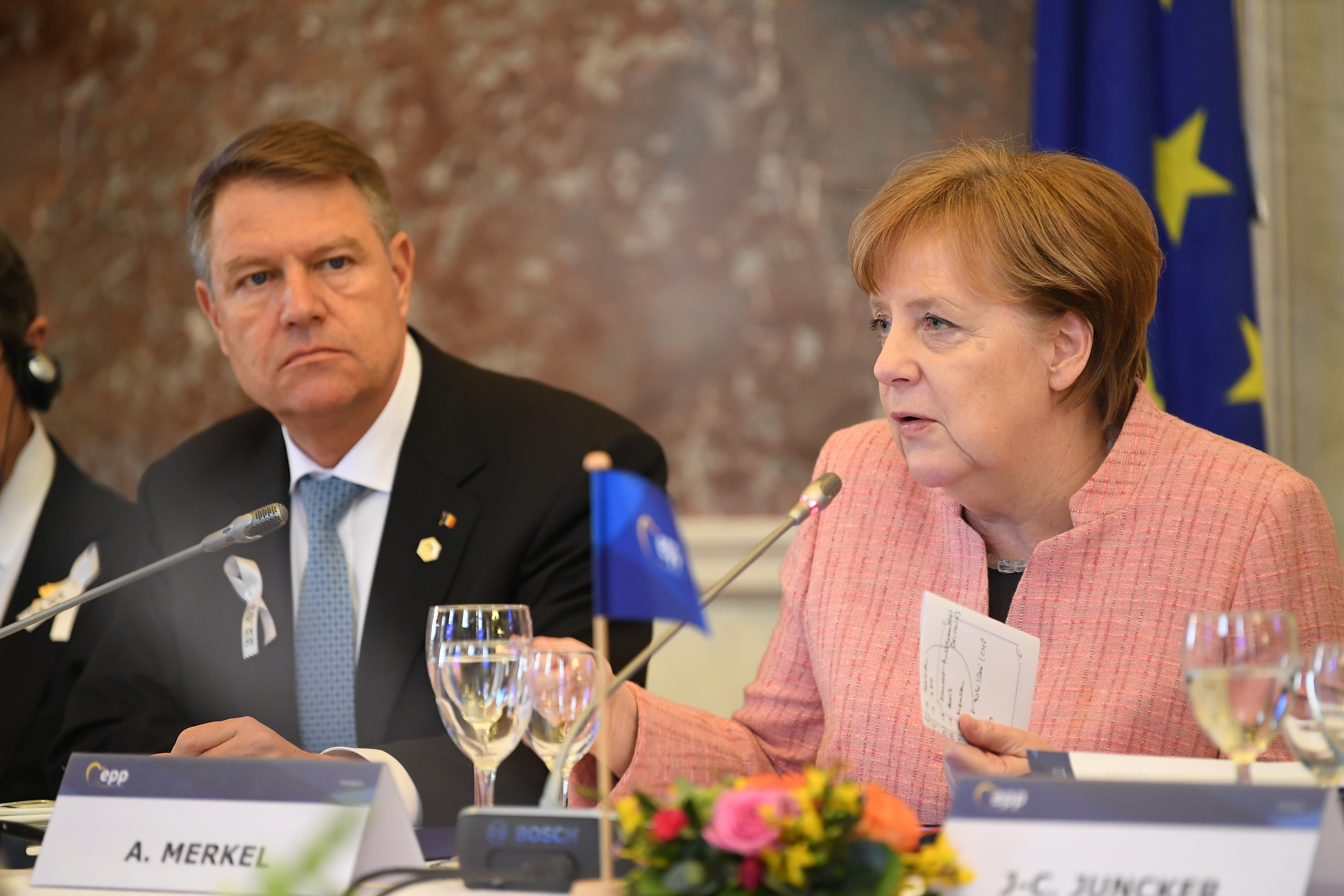
Iohannis with German Chancellor Angela Merkel in March 2018

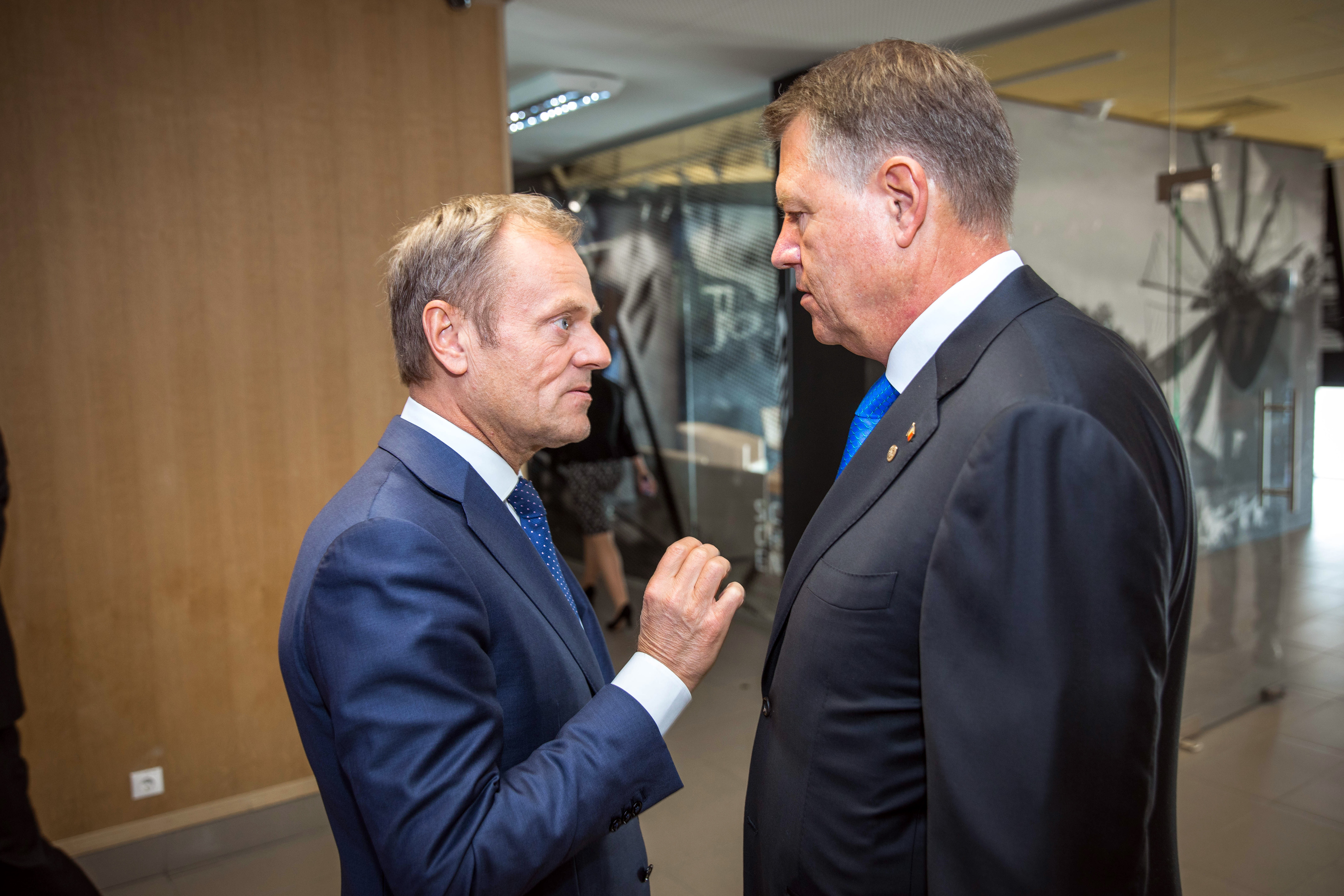
Iohannis with President of the European Council Donald Tusk in May 2019

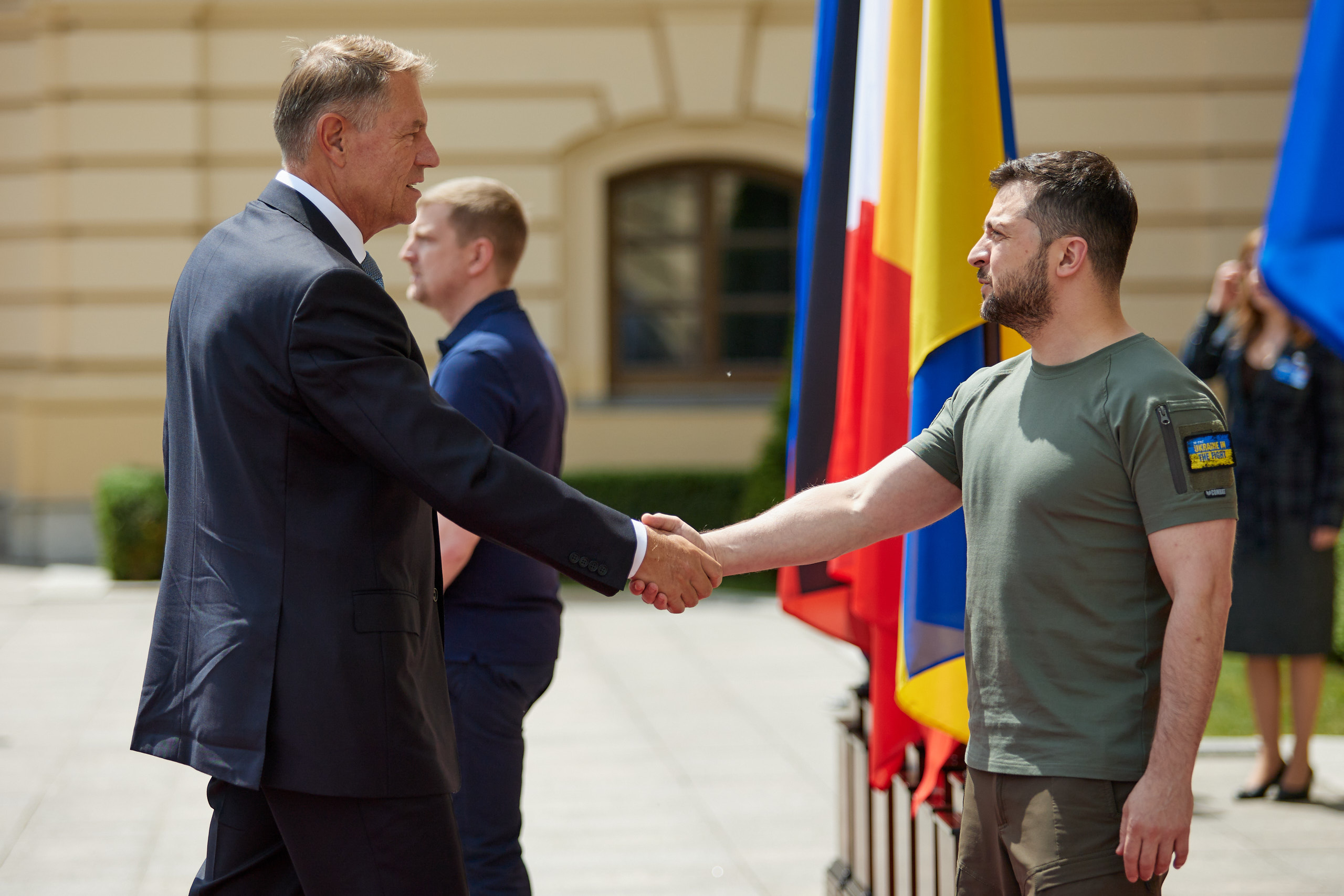
Iohannis with Ukrainian President Volodymyr Zelenskyy in May 2022

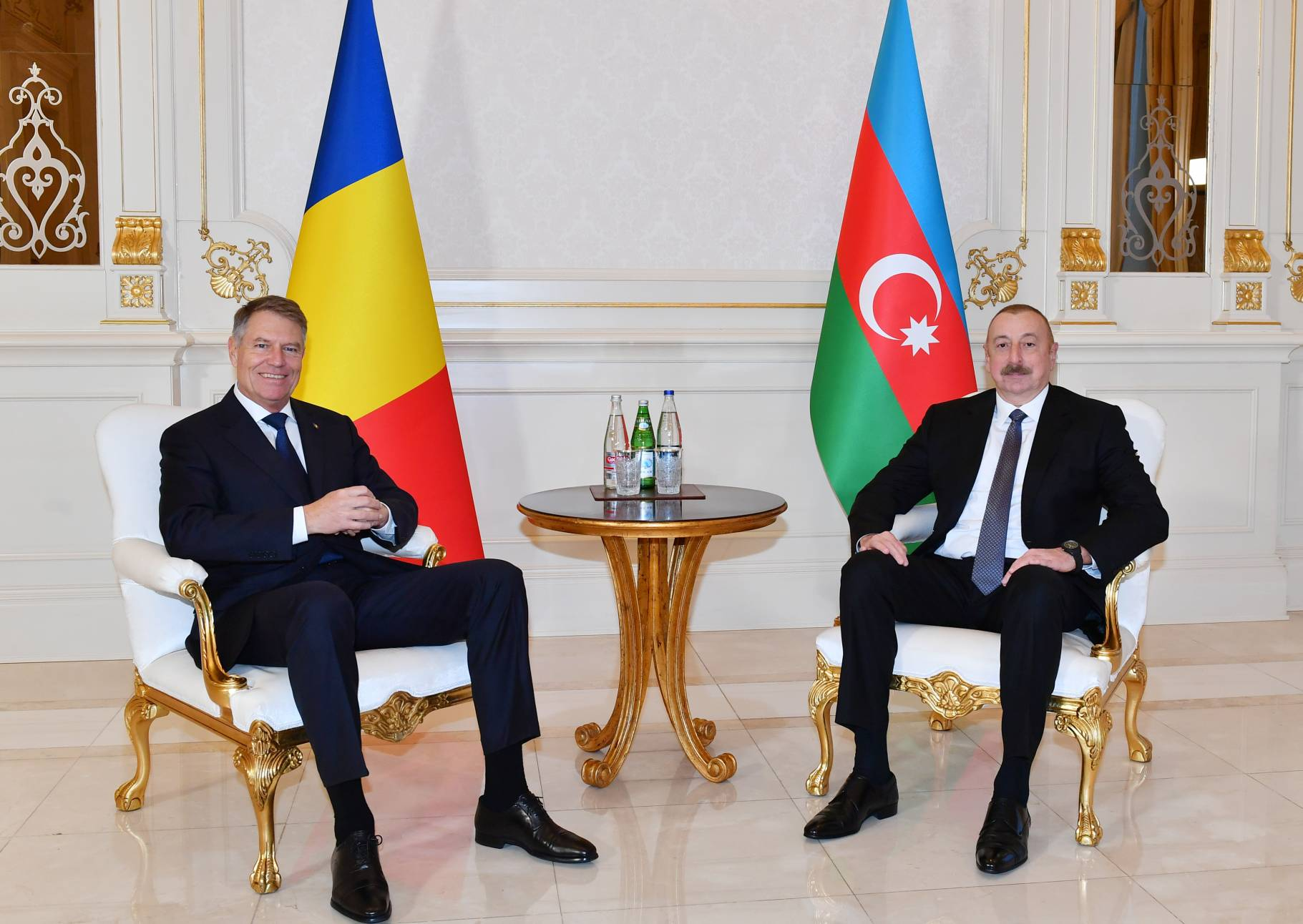
Iohannis with Azerbaijani President Ilham Aliyev in February 2023

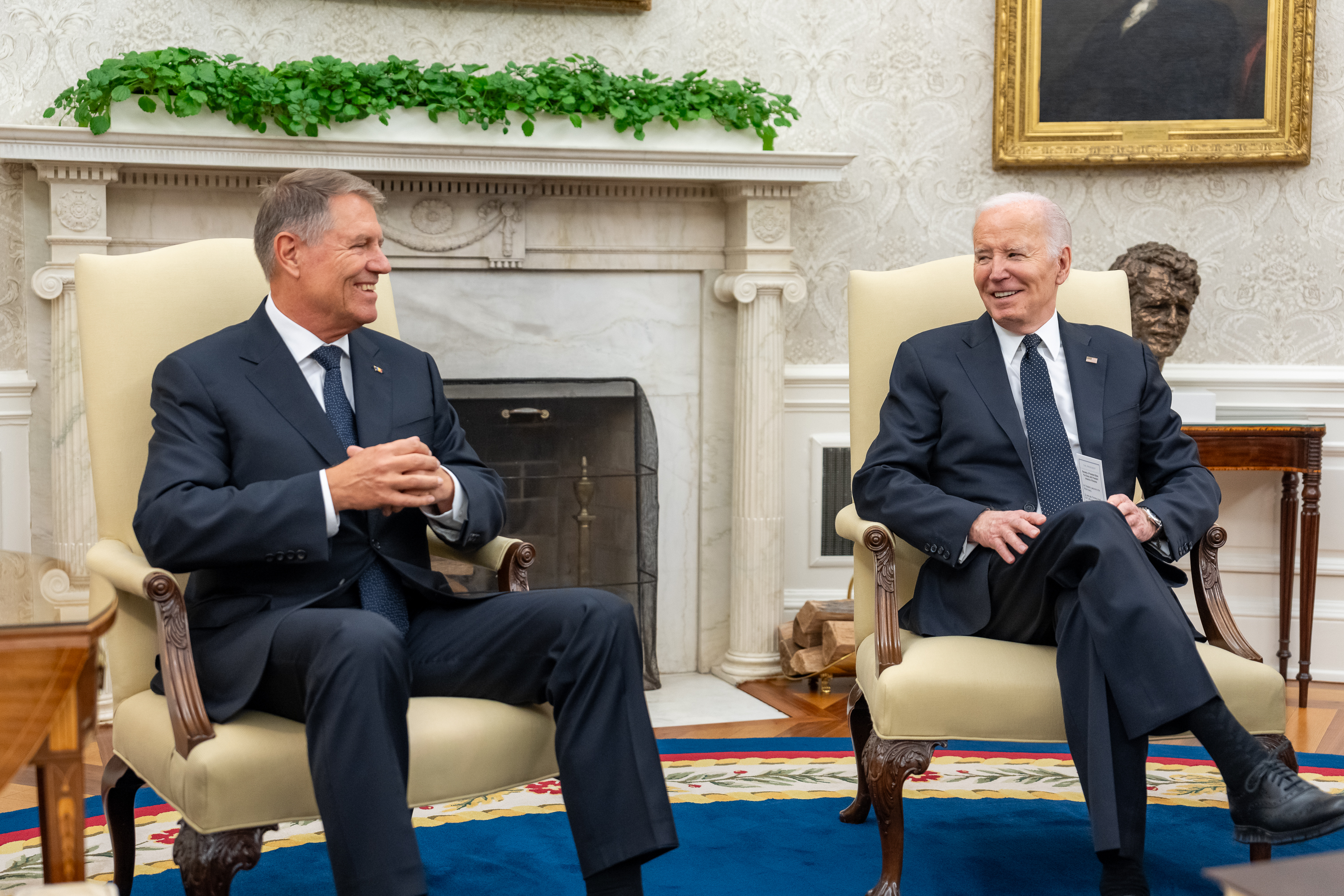
Iohannis with U.S. President Joe Biden in May 2024

Iohannis took office on 21 December 2014, when Traian Băsescu's term ended. His presidential campaign focused on fighting corruption and on improving the justice system. Iohannis is also a supporter of a strongly pro-Western foreign policy. Regarding the unification of the Republic of Moldova with Romania, much discussed in the electoral campaign, Iohannis stated that "is something that only Bucharest can offer and only Chișinău can accept", and this "special relationship must be cultivated and enhanced especially by us [the Romanian state]". Upon taking office, Iohannis suspended his membership within the National Liberal Party (PNL); the Romanian constitution does not allow the president to be a formal member of a political party during his tenure.

A heavily disputed draft law proposed by Nicolae Păun, leader of the Party of the Roma, regarding the amnesty of some misdemeanors and the pardoning of certain penalties was rejected by the Chamber of Deputies at the initiative of Iohannis and the party he led, after PNL asked the Judiciary Committee 17 times to reject the draft law.

The collaboration with socialist Prime Minister Victor Ponta was praised by both sides at the start of the mandate, but deteriorated thereafter once with foreign visits of the Head of the Executive, without informing the President, but especially with the criminal prosecution of Victor Ponta for 22 alleged corruption charges, prompting Iohannis to demand his resignation from the head of the Government. Relations with Parliament went similarly. Iohannis criticised the Parliament for defending MPs by rejecting the requests of the National Anticorruption Directorate for lifting their immunity, as in the case of PSD senator Dan Șova or Prime Minister Victor Ponta. Regarding the judicial system, Iohannis pleads for a sustained fight against corruption. Likewise, Iohannis expressed dissatisfaction with attempted amendments to the Penal Code. In the context of foreign policy, Iohannis and Andrzej Duda, the President of Poland, created Bucharest Nine during a meeting between both in Bucharest on 4 November 2015. The Russian annexation of Ukrainian Crimea and the country's intervention in the east of Ukraine are the main reason for the creation of the organisation. It has nine members, Bulgaria, the Czech Republic, Estonia, Hungary, Latvia, Lithuania, Poland, Romania and Slovakia.

As President, Iohannis made it a habit to hold consultations with parliamentary parties. The first round of consultations, on 12 January 2015, sought a political agreement among all parties that would ensure, by 2017, a minimum threshold of 2% of GDP for the Ministry of Defence. The second round of consultations focused on the legislative priorities of the parliamentary session: voting in diaspora, financing electoral campaigns and parties, and lifting parliamentary immunity. Because Parliament had not implemented the commitments made on 28 January, Iohannis organised another series of consultations on the state of electoral laws and on the rejection of Justice requests for approval of arresting or prosecuting of MPs. Other meetings between the president and parties focused on the Big Brother law package and the national defence strategy.

In February 2016, the National Agency for Fiscal Administration (ANAF) sent a notice of evacuation of the headquarters of two TV stations owned by Dan Voiculescu, sentenced in August 2014 to 10 years imprisonment in a corruption case with 60 million euros worth of prejudice. In this context, Iohannis stated that ANAF approach in Antena TV Group case is "hasty", "inappropriate" and that "freedom of expression in media can not be suppressed for trivial administrative reasons". His position was met with a wave of criticism from supporters and public figures. On the same note, Iohannis stated that union with Moldova is "a less serious approach" in the context of the Transnistria conflict, of differences between Romania and Moldova regarding economic stability and fighting corruption, and can be discussed when things are stable in both countries. The statement sparked indignation among unionists who accused him of demagogy, considering that during the electoral campaign of 2014 he expressed a favourable position on the issue. In March 2018, at the 100th anniversary of the Union of Bessarabia with Romania, he was absent from a plenary vote regarding the issue.

President Iohannis is considered the person primarily responsible for the 2021 Romanian political crisis, with 35% of respondents in a November 2021 CURS opinion poll calling him the main culprit for the crisis. Critics blame him for excluding the USR from the government during late 2021 and thereby allowing the PSD back to power, as happened on 25 November 2021, when the National Coalition for Romania was founded and the Ciucă Cabinet was sworn in. Two months later, Iohannis praised the new coalition, stating that "the Romanian political class has shown democratic maturity". Iohannis was faulted because he had previously criticised the PSD during the 2017–2019 PSD-ALDE coalition. At the 2020 legislative elections, he called the electorate to vote, promising to get rid of the PSD. Some public figures in Romania, who had previously expressed support for Iohannis, complained of his double standard and lack of proper governance. These critics include Vladimir Tismăneanu, Tudor Chirilă, Radu Paraschivescu, Mircea Cărtărescu, Andrei Oișteanu, Ada Solomon, Marius Manole, Cristian Tudor Popescu, and Gabriel Liiceanu. The coalition's rule has been described as being authoritarian, illiberal, kleptocratic and corrupt.

Despite the fact that, officially, the President of Romania is not affiliated with any political party, Iohannis was regarded as the de facto leader of the National Liberal Party (PNL).

On 12 June 2023, according to the protocol of the CNR, Nicolae Ciucă resigned. The next day, President Iohannis designated Marcel Ciolacu to be the next prime-minister. Ciucă became the President of the Romanian Senate on 13 June 2023. UDMR also withdrew from the coalition, after the National Liberals decided to take the Minister of Development, Public Works and Administration, which was held by UDMR in the Ciucă Cabinet. On 15 June 2023, the Parliament of Romania voted through the Ciolacu Cabinet. Iohannis praised the PSD-PNL coalition again, saying that this new model implemented in Romanian politics, the government rotation, "has worked very well so far". He also declared that "the fact that today we are here to formalise the rotation of the prime ministers shows a new level of seriousness of the coalition". During the late part of Iohannis's presidency, especially during Ciucă's premiership, the freedom of the press in Romania declined, according to World Press Freedom Index (from 75.09 in 2021 to 69.04 in 2023). Under Ciucă's premiership, Romania experienced democratic backsliding, with The Economist ranking it last in the European Union in terms of democracy, even behind Viktor Orbán's Hungary. The Economist's Democracy Index also consistently placed Romania behind the African country of Botswana, which Iohannis had sarcastically lamented in a 2014 presidential campaign interview (at the time, Romania was 60th to Botswana's 20th) and which prompted him to stress the need to "consolidate democracy".

On 12 March 2024, Iohannis announced his candidacy for the post of Secretary General of NATO, promising a "renewal of perspective" for the alliance and citing Romania's "deep understanding" of the situation created by the Russian invasion of Ukraine. He was expected to compete against outgoing Dutch prime minister Mark Rutte. Iohannis withdrew his candidacy on 20 June 2024. Following the annulment of the 2024 Romanian presidential election in December, Iohannis was allowed to stay on as president by the Constitutional Court until his successor could be elected. However, on 10 February 2025, Iohannis announced his resignation as President of Romania in order to "not create a divided Romania". This followed a motion filed by opposition MPs calling for Iohannis's suspension, with his resignation becoming effective on 12 February 2025. He was succeeded by Senate president Ilie Bolojan, who served as acting president until the 2025 Romanian presidential election.

== Political positions ==
=== Unification of Moldova and Romania ===
Regarding the unification of Moldova and Romania, Iohannis declared during the 2014 presidential campaign that the unification is something that only Bucharest can provide and only Chișinău can accept. "If Moldovan citizens want the unification with Romania, then nobody can stop them", stated Klaus Iohannis. After election, his position mitigated, stressing that, at the moment, Romania should support Moldova to consolidate its pro-European path. President Klaus Iohannis said that a possible unification of Romania and Moldova could be discussed at the moment things are going well and stable in the two countries.

=== Székely autonomy ===
In March 2017, a sub-group of the ethnically Hungarian Székely community in southeastern Transylvania launched a petition demanding autonomy for their region, arguing for political and administrative self-rule, their own elected president and flag, as well as the recognition of Hungarian as an official language next to Romanian. Iohannis, on a visit to the region in July, cautioned against decentralisation and the creation of regions based on the ethnic origin of residents. He argued for more and improved cooperation between Romanians and Hungarians "as the only solution for us" instead, stressing local administrative reforms and developing the region.

On 28 April 2020, a draft legislation favouring the autonomy of Székely Land, submitted by two deputies of the Democratic Alliance of Hungarians in Romania (UDMR/RMDSZ) in December 2019, was tacitly adopted by the Chamber of Deputies, the lower house of the Parliament of Romania, in which the Social Democratic Party (PSD) held a plurality of seats and all whilst the National Liberal Party (PNL) led a minority government. The draft bill was automatically adopted after it exceeded the 45-day deadline for debate. On 29 April, Iohannis criticised the draft's adoption in a television speech, stating "as we ... fight the coronavirus pandemic, ... the PSD ... fights in the secret offices of the parliament to give Transylvania to the Hungarians". In his speech, he used Hungarian language in a mocking manner: Bună ziua ['good day' in Romanian], dear Romanians; jó napot kívánok ['good day' in Hungarian], PSD". On the same day, the draft was rejected in the Senate, with both PNL's and PSD's senators voting in favour of the rejection.

The president's speech was met with widespread criticism. Hungarian Minister of Foreign Affairs and Trade Péter Szijjártó described the statements of Iohannis as "particularly uncivilised and suitable for inciting hatred" and asked the Romanian president to show "more respect to Hungarians". In turn, Romanian Minister of Foreign Affairs Bogdan Aurescu called Szijjártó's statements "provocative and inadequate". In a radio interview, Hungarian Prime Minister Viktor Orbán also reacted to the speech, saying "we have never heard such remarks from Romania, not even in the worst, most antidemocratic, tumultuous times". The president's comments were also criticised by members of the Romanian opposition parties PSD and ALDE, but also by the confidence and supply USR (which has been supporting the PNL minority government since 2019). Iohannis was fined RON 5,000 by the National Council for Combating Discrimination (CNCD) for discrimination and ethnicity/nationality-based violation of the right to dignity.

=== Romanian minority rights in Ukraine ===
Iohannis criticised Ukraine's 2017 education law, which makes Ukrainian the only language of education in state schools, and cancelled his visit to Kyiv in October 2017. Iohannis said that Ukraine's new education law "will drastically limit the access of minorities to education in their native language. We are deeply hurt by this. We have many Romanians in Ukraine".

=== Anti-corruption ===
Iohannis is a supporter of the fight against corruption in Romania. Since coming to power in November 2014, has sent several messages of support to prosecutors investigating sensitive cases against politicians accused of corruption. Making one of its important position was on 25 February 2016 at the annual meeting of the National Anticorruption Directorate: "From year to year the work of the National Anticorruption Directorate has become more effective as the number of cases investigated and complexity, as well as final decisions on confiscation and recovery of property from crime. You are a model of functional institution and created a performance standard. Through the work and achievements, you've earned the appreciation of the Romanian citizens who want to live in a just society, in a country without corruption, the institutions, elect to represent them and those who perform public functions are actually serving the people. The results obtained by you in fighting corruption, appreciated and beyond Romania's borders are a guarantee that the process of strengthening democracy and the rule of law in Romania are on track. I am convinced that we will be increasingly more powerful in applying the constitutional principle that nobody is above the law and to align our established practice in countries with democracies that put the citizen at the centere of any policy", Iohannis stated.

He has rejected demands for the suspension of the head of Romania's National Anticorruption Directorate (DNA), Laura Codruța Kövesi.

=== LGBT rights ===
In terms of LGBT rights and recognition of same-sex unions in Romania, Iohannis has not stated clearly his opinion:

Romanian society is not yet ready for a definite answer. I won't give an answer but as a president I am willing to open up the issue for discussion. We have to accept that any minority has rights and that a majority is strong when they protect the minority.

— Iohannis in a 2014 debate with bloggers

However, he is pleading for the acceptance of differences and diversity: "nobody should be persecuted because they belong to a different group or they are different".

Regarding the initiative to amend Article 48 of the Constitution (prohibition of gay marriage) started by the Coalition for Family (Romanian: Coaliția pentru Familie), Iohannis reiterated the concepts of tolerance and accepting one another. "It is wrong to give obedience or walk the path of religious fanaticism and ultimatum solicitations. I do not believe in them and do not support them. I believe in tolerance, trust and openness to other", said Iohannis in a press conference. Thus, Iohannis is the first top official in the country to open the discussion about same-sex marriages. His reaction was praised by international media, including The Washington Post, while religious and conservative organisations in Romania have criticised his position on LGBT rights.

=== Migration ===
Iohannis has said that migration "has to be controlled" and "it affects Romanian habits" and has supported stronger external European borders. Iohannis accepted the migration quota set for his country by the EU, but said he is still opposed to mandatory quotas being set by the Commission.

== Personal life ==
Alongside his mother tongue, German, and the language of the majority, the Romanian language, Iohannis is also fluent in English and can speak French to a certain degree. The original German spelling of his name is Johannis, but the name was registered by a Romanian official as Iohannis on his birth certificate and he has used both spellings interchangeably ever since.

In 1989, he married ethnic Romanian Carmen Lăzurcă, an English teacher at the Gheorghe Lazăr National College in Sibiu. They have no children.

Iohannis is a member of the Evangelical Church of the Augsburg Confession in Romania, the German-speaking Lutheran church, mainly of the Transylvanian Saxons, with a lesser presence in other parts of Romania.

As of 2014, his parents, sister and a niece live in Würzburg.

Iohannis has stated that his family settled in Transylvania in present-day Romania 650 years ago, more specifically around 1500 in the small town of Cisnădie (German: Heltau), Sibiu County.

== Honours ==
=== International and National Awards ===
- 2023 – (Germany) German Civic Award, conferred by the Bad Harzburg Civic Foundation
- 2023 – Franz Werfel Award for Human Rights, granted by the Centre against Expulsions in Bonn, the Federal Republic of Germany
- 2020 – European Charles IV Prize of the Sudeten German Homeland Association, the Federal Republic of Germany
- 2020/2021 – Charlemagne Prize, awarded by the City of Aachen, the Federal Republic of Germany
- 2020 – The Kaiser Otto Prize, awarded by the City of Magdeburg, the Federal Republic of Germany
- 2020 – (European Union) European Prize Coudenhove-Kalergi, European Society Coudenhove-Kalergi
- 2019 – Medal of Honour (Goldene Ehrennadel), the Democratic Forum of Germans in Romania, Sibiu
- 2018 – Franz Josef Strauss award, Hanns Seidel Foundation, Munich, the Federal Republic of Germany
- 2017 – Light Unto the Nations award, American Jewish Committee, Washington, D.C., United States of America
- 2017 – Semper Opera Ball Dresden Medal of St. George, the Federal Republic of Germany
- 2016 – Hermann Ehlers award, Hermann Ehlers Foundation, Kiel, the Federal Republic of Germany
- 2016 – Martin Buber-Plaque, EURIADE Foundation, Kerkrade, the Kingdom of the Netherlands
- 2010 – Friend of the Jewish Communities in Romania Medal of Honour, Sibiu, Romania
- 2010 – (Germany) The German Expatriates Association Plaque of Honour

=== State honorary distinctions ===
- 2023 – (Portugal) Grand Collar of the Order of Liberty of the Portuguese Republic
- 2022 – Grand Cross of the Order for Merits to Lithuania
- 2022 – Order of the Three Stars – Commander Grand Cross (1st class) – Republic of Latvia
- 2022 – Grand Collar of the State of Palestine
- 2021 – Collar of the Order of the Cross of Terra Mariana of the Republic of Estonia
- 2019 – (Romania) Emblem of Honour of Romanian Army
- 2017 – Grand Order of King Tomislav with Sash and Grand Star of the Republic of Croatia
- 2016 – (Slovakia) Order (First Class) of the White Double Cross of the Slovak Republic
- 2016 – (France) Grand Cross of the Legion of Honour of the French Republic
- 2016 – Order of the White Eagle of the Republic of Poland
- 2016 – Grand Cross (Special Class) of the Order of Merit of the Federal Republic of Germany
- 2016 – Order Stara Planina with Ribbon of the Republic of Bulgaria
- 2016 – (Italy) Knight Grand Cross of the Order of Merit of the Italian Republic
- 2016 – Order of the Gold Lion of the House of Nassau, the Grand Duchy of Luxembourg
- 2016 – Collar (First Class) of the Order of Vytautas the Great, the Republic of Lithuania
- 2016 – Order of the Holy Sepulchre of the Patriarchate of the Holy City of Jerusalem and all Palestine and Israel
- 2016 – Order of the Republic of Moldova
- 2015 – (Portugal) Grand Collar of the Order of the Infante D. Henrique of the Portuguese Republic
- 2014 – Officer's Cross of the Order of Merit of the Federal Republic of Germany
- 2011 – Knight of the National Order for Merit of Romania
- 2009 – Officer of the Order of the Crown of the Kingdom of Belgium
- 2009 – Grand Cross Order of Merit, the Republic of Austria
- 2009 – Officer of the Order of Merit of the Grand Duchy of Luxembourg
- 2008 – (Italy) Commander of the Order of the Star of Italian Solidarity of the Italian Republic
- 2007 – Knight of the National Order of the Star of Romania
- 2006 – Cross of the Order of Merit of the Federal Republic of Germany

== Books ==
Klaus Johannis published three books with a main focus on politics as follows:

- 2014 – Step by step (Romanian: Pas cu pas, German: Schritt für Schritt, ISBN 978-606-588-756-5), autobiographical volume and bestseller in the history of Gaudeamus International Book and Education Fair, detailing his political career as mayor of his native Sibiu (German: Hermannstadt).
- 2015 – First step (Romanian: Primul pas, German: Erster Schritt, ISBN 978-606-588-831-9), a continuation of the volume "Step by step" which was published in 2014. The volume describes his future plans as president.
- 2019 – EU.RO – un dialog deschis despre Europa (EU.RO – an open dialog on Europe, German: Ein offener Dialog über Europa), an introductory and statistical volume on the European Union (EU)

== Electoral history ==
=== Local elections (Mayor of Sibiu) ===
Election	Affiliation	First round			Second round		
Election	Affiliation	Votes	Percentage	Position	Votes	Percentage	Position
2000	FDGR/DFDR	20,629	33.10%	1st	46,286	69.18%	1st
2004	FDGR/DFDR	73,621	88.69%	1st			
2008	FDGR/DFDR	50,107	83.26%	1st			
2012	FDGR/DFDR	53,281	77.89%	1st			

=== Presidential elections ===
Election	Affiliation	First round			Second round		
Election	Affiliation	Votes	Percentage	Position	Votes	Percentage	Position
2014	ACL (also supported by FDGR/DFDR)	2,881,406	30.37%	2nd	6,288,769	54.43%	1st
2019	PNL (also supported by FDGR/DFDR)	3,485,292	37.82%	1st	6,509,135	66.09%	1st

== Notes ==
Political offices
Preceded by Dan Condurat	Mayor of Sibiu; 2000–2014	Succeeded by Astrid Fodor
Preceded by Traian Băsescu	President of Romania; 2014–2025	Succeeded by Ilie Bolojan; Acting
Party political offices
Preceded by Wolfgang Wittstock	Leader of the Democratic Forum of Germans in Romania; 2002–2013	Succeeded by Paul-Jürgen Porr
Preceded by Crin Antonescu	Leader of the National Liberal Party; 2014	Succeeded by Vasile Blaga
Preceded by Crin Antonescu	Leader of the National Liberal Party; 2014	Succeeded by Alina Gorghiu
Order of precedence
First	Order of precedence in Romania; President	Succeeded by Nicolae Ciucă as President of the Senate
