= Order of precedence in the Polish–Lithuanian Commonwealth =

Relative preeminence of officials for ceremonial purposes

The order of precedence for members of the Sejm (parliament) of the Polish–Lithuanian Commonwealth was created at the same time as the Commonwealth itself – at the Lublin Sejm in 1569. The Commonwealth was a union, in existence from 1569 to 1795, of two constituent nations: the Crown of the Kingdom of Poland (commonly known as Korona, or "the Crown") and the Grand Duchy of Lithuania. The union's legislative power was vested in a diet (assembly) known as the Sejm which consisted of the three Estates of the Sejm: the monarch, holding the titles of King of Poland and Grand Duke of Lithuania; the Senate; and the House of Deputies.

The order of precedence indicated where senators and deputies would sit during parliamentary sessions and in what order they cast their votes. The order was also followed at other formal occasions, such as royal coronations. The order of precedence remained almost unchanged from its inception in 1569 until the ultimate partition of Poland in 1795. The only changes were made to reflect the addition of new territories as the Commonwealth expanded eastwards during the 16th and 17th centuries. Territitorial losses incurred during Poland's decline in the second half of the 17th and throughout the 18th century had less bearing on the composition of the Sejm, as titular senators and deputies continued to sit in the parliament despite the loss of the lands they officially represented.

== Senators ==
The Senate traced its roots to the royal privy council and consisted of individuals appointed by the king to specified senatorial offices. The senatorial offices may be divided into three types:

- ecclesiastical, that is the entire Roman Catholic episcopate (all bishops and archbishops) of the Commonwealth;
- territorial, that is voivodes, or regional governors, and castellans, or caretakers of castles;
- ministers of the royal and grand-ducal cabinets, for the Crown and for Lithuania respectively.

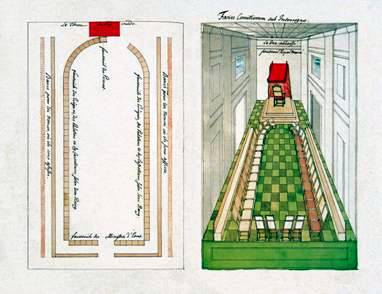
Arrangement of seats in the Senate, 1732

Bishops, voivodes and castellans of major cities were considered greater senators (senatorowie więksi), or chair senators (senatorowie krzesłowi) as they were entitled to sit in designated armchairs during the Senate's sessions. The remaining lesser senators (senatorowie mniejsi) were also known as bench senators (senatorowie drążkowi) as they were sitting wherever they could find a place behind the chair senators.

The Archbishop of Gniezno, Poland's first capital city until 1038, also holding the title of Primate of Poland, was the highest ranking senator who also served as an interrex (an acting king) during a vacancy of the royal throne. The Castellan of Kraków, Poland's capital until 1596, was the highest ranking secular senator. His precedence before the Voivode of Kraków dated back to a rebellion led by Voivode Skarbimir in 1117, for which Duke Boleslaus the Wrymouth punished him by blinding and by making his office inferior to that of the local castellan.

Color coding
Ecclesiastical	Greater territorial	Lesser territorial	Cabinet ministers

#	English title	Polish title	Type	Rank	Voivodeship	Notes
1	Archbishop of Gniezno	Arcybiskup gnieźnieński	ecclesiastical	greater	Kalisz	Primate of Poland; in Gniezno Voivodeship from 1768
2	Archbishop of Lviv	Arcybiskup lwowski	ecclesiastical	greater	Ruthenia	
3	Bishop of Kraków	Biskup krakowski	ecclesiastical	greater	Kraków	
4	Bishop of Kuyavia	Biskup kujawski	ecclesiastical	greater	Brześć Kujawski	
5–6	Bishop of Vilnius	Biskup wileński	ecclesiastical	greater	Vilnius	Alternating with the bishop of Poznań
5–6	Bishop of Poznań	Biskup poznański	ecclesiastical	greater	Poznań	Alternating with the bishop of Vilnius
7–8	Bishop of Płock	Biskup płocki	ecclesiastical	greater	Płock	Alternating with the bishop of Warmia
7–8	Bishop of Warmia	Biskup warmiński	ecclesiastical	greater	Warmia	Alternating with the bishop of Płock
9	Bishop of Lutsk	Biskup łucki	ecclesiastical	greater	Volhynia	
10	Bishop of Przemyśl	Biskup przemyski	ecclesiastical	greater	Ruthenia	
11	Bishop of Samogitia	Biskup żmudzki	ecclesiastical	greater	Samogitia	
12	Bishop of Chełmno	Biskup chełmiński	ecclesiastical	greater	Chełmno	
13	Bishop of Chełm	Biskup chełmski	ecclesiastical	greater	Ruthenia	
14	Bishop of Kiev	Biskup kijowski	ecclesiastical	greater	Kiev	
15	Bishop of Kamianets-Podilskyi	Biskup kamieniecki	ecclesiastical	greater	Podolia	
16	Bishop of Livonia	Biskup inflancki	ecclesiastical	greater	Livonia	After 1677
17	Bishop of Smolensk	Biskup smoleński	ecclesiastical	greater	Smolensk	
18	Castellan of Kraków	Kasztelan krakowski	territorial	greater	Kraków	
19	Voivode of Kraków	Wojewoda krakowski	territorial	greater	Kraków	
20	Voivode of Poznań	Wojewoda poznański	territorial	greater	Poznań	
21	Voivode of Vilnius	Wojewoda wileński	territorial	greater	Vilnius	
22	Voivode of Sandomierz	Wojewoda sandomierski	territorial	greater	Sandomierz	
23	Castellan of Vilnius	Kasztelan wileński	territorial	greater	Vilnius	
24	Voivode of Kalisz	Wojewoda kaliski	territorial	greater	Kalisz	
25	Voivode of Trakai	Wojewoda trocki	territorial	greater	Trakai	
26	Voivode of Sieradz	Wojewoda sieradzki	territorial	greater	Sieradz	
27	Castellan of Trakai	Kasztelan trocki	territorial	greater	Trakai	
28	Voivode of Łęczyca	Wojewoda łęczycki	territorial	greater	Łęczyca	
29	Elder of Samogitia	Starosta żmudzki	territorial	greater	Samogitia	
30	Voivode of Brześć Kujawski	Wojewoda brzesko-kujawski	territorial	greater	Brześć Kujawski	
31	Voivode of Kiev	Wojewoda kijowski	territorial	greater	Kiev	
32	Voivode of Inowrocław	Wojewoda inowrocławski	territorial	greater	Inowrocław	
33	Voivode of Ruthenia	Wojewoda ruski	territorial	greater	Ruthenia	
34	Voivode of Volhynia	Wojewoda wołyński	territorial	greater	Volhynia	
35	Voivode of Podolia	Wojewoda podolski	territorial	greater	Podolia	
36	Voivode of Smolensk	Wojewoda smoleński	territorial	greater	Smoleńsk	
37	Voivode of Lublin	Wojewoda lubelski	territorial	greater	Lublin	
38	Voivode of Polatsk	Wojewoda połocki	territorial	greater	Polatsk	
39	Voivode of Belz	Wojewoda bełski	territorial	greater	Belz	
40	Voivode of Navahrudak	Wojewoda nowogródzki	territorial	greater	Navahrudak	
41	Voivode of Płock	Wojewoda płocki	territorial	greater	Płock	
42	Voivode of Vitsebsk	Wojewoda witebski	territorial	greater	Vitsebsk	
43	Voivode of Masovia	Wojewoda mazowiecki	territorial	greater	Masovia	
44	Voivode of Podlachia	Wojewoda podlaski	territorial	greater	Podlachia	
45	Voivode of Rawa Mazowiecka	Wojewoda rawski	territorial	greater	Rawa Mazowiecka	
46	Voivode of Brest-Litovsk	Wojewoda brzesko-litewski	territorial	greater	Brest-Litovsk	
47	Voivode of Chełmno	Wojewoda chełmiński	territorial	greater	Chełmno	
48	Voivode of Mstsislau	Wojewoda mścisławski	territorial	greater	Mstsislau	
49	Voivode of Malbork	Wojewoda malborski	territorial	greater	Malbork	
50	Voivode of Bratslav	Wojewoda bracławski	territorial	greater	Bratslav	
51	Voivode of Pomerania	Wojewoda pomorski	territorial	greater	Pomerania	
52	Voivode of Minsk	Wojewoda miński	territorial	greater	Minsk	
53	Voivode of Livonia	Wojewoda inflancki	territorial	greater	Livonia	After 1677
54	Voivode of Chernihiv	Wojewoda czernihowski	territorial	greater	Chernihiv	After 1635
55	Castellan of Poznań	Kasztelan poznański	territorial	greater	Poznań	
56	Castellan of Sandomierz	Kasztelan sandomierski	territorial	greater	Sandomierz	
57	Castellan of Kalisz	Kasztelan kaliski	territorial	greater	Kalisz	
58	Castellan of Wojnicz	Kasztelan wojnicki	territorial	greater	Kraków	
59	Castellan of Gniezno	Kasztelan gnieźnieński	territorial	greater	Kalisz	In Gniezno Voivodeship from 1768
60	Castellan of Sieradz	Kasztelan sieradzki	territorial	greater	Sieradz	
61	Castellan of Łęczyca	Kasztelan łęczycki	territorial	greater	Łęczyca	
62	Castellan of Samogitia	Kasztelan żmudzki	territorial	greater	Samogitia	
63	Castellan of Brześć Kujawski	Kasztelan brzesko-kujawski	territorial	greater	Brześć Kujawski	
64	Castellan of Kiev	Kasztelan kijowski	territorial	greater	Kiev	
65	Castellan of Inowrocław	Kasztelan inowrocławski	territorial	greater	Inowrocław	
66	Castellan of Lviv	Kasztelan lwowski	territorial	greater	Ruthenia	
67	Castellan of Volhynia	Kasztelan wołyński	territorial	greater	Volhynia	
68	Castellan of Kamianets-Podilskyi	Kasztelan kamieniecki	territorial	greater	Podolia	
69	Castellan of Smolensk	Kasztelan smoleński	territorial	greater	Smolensk	
70	Castellan of Lublin	Kasztelan lubelski	territorial	greater	Lublin	
71	Castellan of Polatsk	Kasztelan połocki	territorial	greater	Polatsk	
72	Castellan of Belz	Kasztelan bełski	territorial	greater	Belz	
73	Castellan of Navahrudak	Kasztelan nowogródzki	territorial	greater	Navahrudak	
74	Castellan of Płock	Kasztelan płocki	territorial	greater	Płock	
75	Castellan of Vitsebsk	Kasztelan witebski	territorial	greater	Vitsebsk	
76	Castellan of Czersk	Kasztelan czerski	territorial	greater	Masovia	
77	Castellan of Podlachia	Kasztelan podlaski	territorial	greater	Podlachia	
78	Castellan of Rawa Mazowiecka	Kasztelan rawski	territorial	greater	Rawa Mazowiecka	
79	Castellan of Brest-Litovsk	Kasztelan brzesko-litewski	territorial	greater	Brest-Litovsk	
80	Castellan of Chełmno	Kasztelan chełmiński	territorial	greater	Chełmno	
81	Castellan of Mstsislau	Kasztelan mścisławski	territorial	greater	Mstsislau	
82	Castellan of Elbląg	Kasztelan elbląski	territorial	greater	Malbork	
83	Castellan of Bratslav	Kasztelan bracławski	territorial	greater	Bratslav	
84	Castellan of Gdańsk	Kasztelan gdański	territorial	greater	Pomerania	
85	Castellan of Minsk	Kasztelan miński	territorial	greater	Minsk	
86	Castellan of Livonia	Kasztelan inflancki	territorial	greater	Livonia	
87	Castellan of Chernihiv	Kasztelan czernihowski	territorial	greater	Chernihiv	
88	Castellan of Nowy Sącz	Kasztelan sądecki	territorial	lesser	Kraków	
89	Castellan of Międzyrzecz	Kasztelan międzyrzecki	territorial	lesser	Poznań	
90	Castellan of Wiślica	Kasztelan wiślicki	territorial	lesser	Sandomierz	
91	Castellan of Biecz	Kasztelan biecki	territorial	lesser	Kraków	
92	Castellan of Rogoźno	Kasztelan rogoziński	territorial	lesser	Poznań	
93	Castellan of Radom	Kasztelan radomski	territorial	lesser	Sandomierz	
94	Castellan of Zawichost	Kasztelan zawichojski	territorial	lesser	Sandomierz	
95	Castellan of Ląd	Kasztelan lądzki	territorial	lesser	Kalisz	
96	Castellan of Śrem	Kasztelan śremski	territorial	lesser	Poznań	
97	Castellan of Żarnów	Kasztelan żarnowski	territorial	lesser	Sandomierz	
98	Castellan of Małogoszcz	Kasztelan małogoski	territorial	lesser	Sandomierz	
99	Castellan of Wieluń	Kasztelan wieluński	territorial	lesser	Sieradz	
100	Castellan of Przemyśl	Kasztelan przemyski	territorial	lesser	Ruthenia	
101	Castellan of Halych	Kasztelan halicki	territorial	lesser	Ruthenia	
102	Castellan of Sanok	Kasztelan sanocki	territorial	lesser	Ruthenia	
103	Castellan of Chełm	Kasztelan chełmski	territorial	lesser	Ruthenia	
104	Castellan of Dobrzyń	Kasztelan dobrzyński	territorial	lesser	Brześć Kujawski	
105	Castellan of Połaniec	Kasztelan połaniecki	territorial	lesser	Sandomierz	
106	Castellan of Przemęt	Kasztelan przemęcki	territorial	lesser	Poznań	
107	Castellan of Krzywiń	Kasztelan krzywiński	territorial	lesser	Poznań	
108	Castellan of Czchów	Kasztelan czchowski	territorial	lesser	Sandomierz	
109	Castellan of Nakło nad Notecią	Kasztelan nakielski	territorial	lesser	Kalisz	In Gniezno Voivodeship from 1768
110	Castellan of Rozprza	Kasztelan rospierski	territorial	lesser	Sieradz	
111	Castellan of Biechów	Kasztelan biechowski	territorial	lesser	Kalisz	
112	Castellan of Bydgoszcz	Kasztelan bydgoski	territorial	lesser	Inowrocław	
113	Castellan of Brzeziny	Kasztelan brzeziński	territorial	lesser	Łęczyca	
114	Castellan of Kruszwica	Kasztelan kruszwicki	territorial	lesser	Brześć Kujawski	
115	Castellan of Oświęcim	Kasztelan oświęcimski	territorial	lesser	Kraków	
116	Castellan of Kamieńsk	Kasztelan kamieński	territorial	lesser	Kalisz	In Gniezno Voivodeship from 1768
117	Castellan of Spycimierz	Kasztelan spycimierski	territorial	lesser	Sieradz	
118	Castellan of Inowłódz	Kasztelan inowłodzki	territorial	lesser	Łęczyca	
119	Castellan of Kowal	Kasztelan kowalski	territorial	lesser	Łęczyca	
120	Castellan of Santok	Kasztelan santocki	territorial	lesser	Poznań	
121	Castellan of Sochaczew	Kasztelan sochaczewski	territorial	lesser	Rawa Mazowiecka	
122	Castellan of Warsaw	Kasztelan warszawski	territorial	lesser	Masovia	
123	Castellan of Gostynin	Kasztelan gostyński	territorial	lesser	Rawa Mazowiecka	
124	Castellan of Wizna	Kasztelan wiski	territorial	lesser	Masovia	
125	Castellan of Raciąż	Kasztelan raciąski	territorial	lesser	Płock	
126	Castellan of Sierpc	Kasztelan sierpski	territorial	lesser	Płock	
127	Castellan of Wyszogród	Kasztelan wyszogrodzki	territorial	lesser	Masovia	
128	Castellan of Rypin	Kasztelan rypiński	territorial	lesser	Brześć Kujawski	
129	Castellan of Zakroczym	Kasztelan zakroczymski	territorial	lesser	Masovia	
130	Castellan of Ciechanów	Kasztelan ciechanowski	territorial	lesser	Masovia	
131	Castellan of Liw	Kasztelan liwski	territorial	lesser	Masovia	
132	Castellan of Lipno	Kasztelan lipnowski	territorial	lesser	Brześć Kujawski	
133	Castellan of Lubaczów	Kasztelan lubaczowski	territorial	lesser	Belz	
134	Equerry castellan of the Sieradz Voivodeship	Kasztelan konarski z woj. sieradzkiego	territorial	lesser	Sieradz	
135	Equerry castellan of the Łęczyca Voivodeship	Kasztelan konarski z woj. łęczyckiego	territorial	lesser	Łęczyca	
136	Equerry castellan of the Brześć Kujawski Voivodeship	Kasztelan konarski z woj. brzesko-kujawskiego	territorial	lesser	Brześć Kujawski	
137	Grand Marshal of the Crown	Marszałek wielki koronny	cabinet	lesser		
138	Grand Marshal of Lithuania	Marszałek wielki litewski	cabinet	lesser		
139	Grand Chancellor of the Crown	Kanclerz wielki koronny	cabinet	lesser		
140	Grand Chancellor of Lithuania	Kanclerz wielki litewski	cabinet	lesser		
141	Under-Chancellor of the Crown	Podkanclerzy koronny	cabinet	lesser		
142	Under-Chancellor of Lithuania	Podkanclerzy litewski	cabinet	lesser		
143	Treasurer of the Crown	Podskarbi koronny	cabinet	lesser		
144	Treasurer of Lithuania	Podskarbi litewski	cabinet	lesser		
145	Court Marshal of the Crown	Marszałek nadworny koronny	cabinet	lesser		
146	Court Marshal of Lithuania	Marszałek nadworny litewski	cabinet	lesser		

== Deputies ==
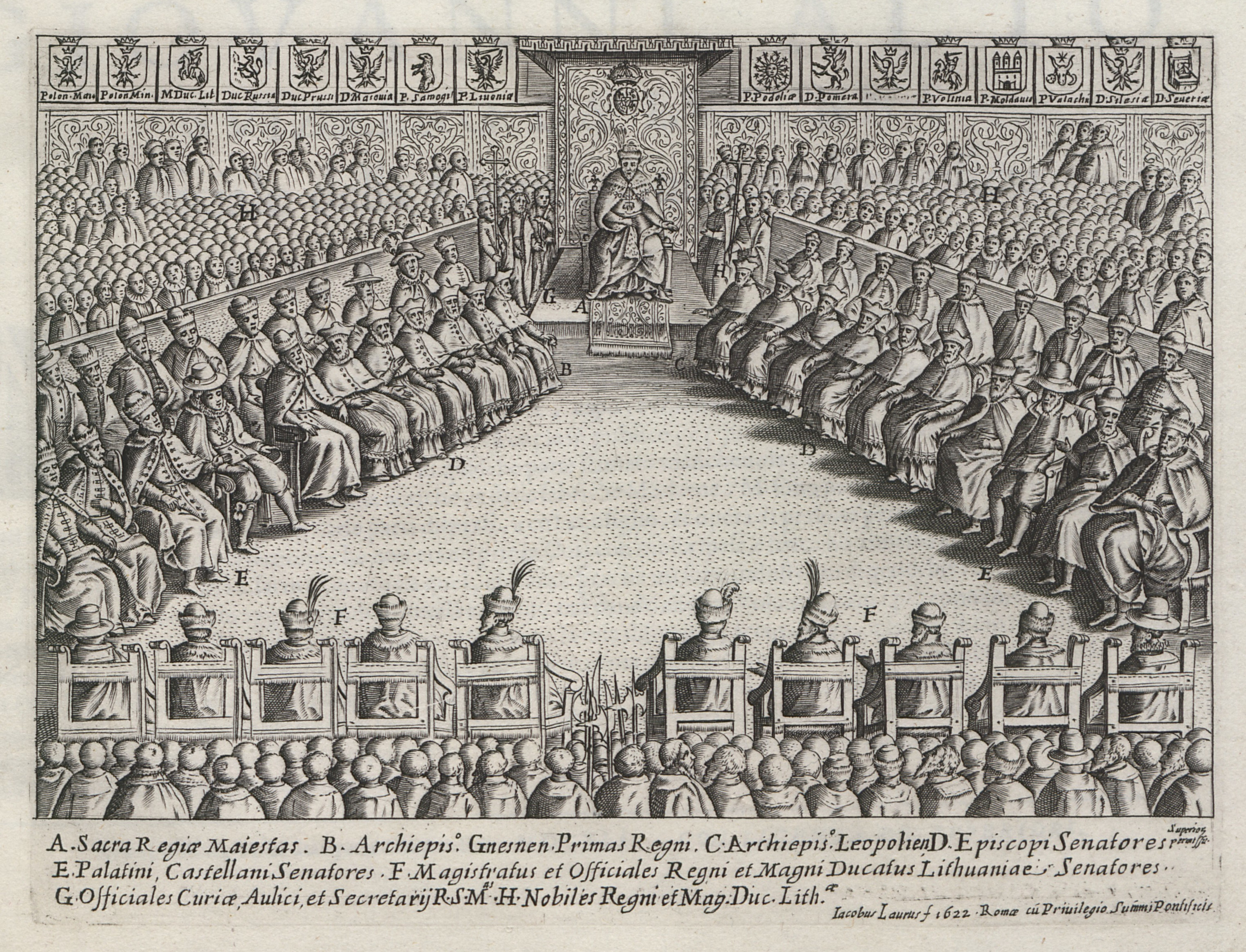
The Sejm in session, 1622

Deputies elected in local sejmiks.

#	Constituency	Voivodeship	Deputies
1	Kraków	Kraków	6
2	Poznań	Poznań	6
3	Oświęcim–Zator	Kraków	2
4	Vilnius	Vilnius	2
5	Ashmyany	Vilnius	2
6	Lida	Vilnius	2
7	Vilkmergė	Vilnius	2
8	Braslaw	Vilnius	2
9	Sandomierz	Sandomierz	7
10	Kalisz	Kalisz	6
11	Trakai	Trakai	2
12	Hrodna	Trakai	2
13	Kaunas	Trakai	2
14	Upytė	Trakai	2
15	Sieradz	Sieradz	4
16	Wieluń	Sieradz	2
17	Łęczyca	Łęczyca	4
18	Samogitia	Samogitia	2
19	Brześć Kujawski	Brześć Kujawski	2
20	Dobrzyń	Brześć Kujawski	2
21	Kiev	Kiev	6
22	Inowrocław	Inowrocław	2
23	Lviv	Ruthenia	2
24	Przemyśl	Ruthenia	2
25	Sanok	Ruthenia	2
26	Halych	Ruthenia	2
27	Chełm	Ruthenia	2
28	Volhynia	Volhynia	6
29	Podolia	Podolia	6
30	Smolensk	Smolensk	2
31	Starodub	Smolensk	2
32	Lublin	Lublin	3
33	Polatsk	Polatsk	2
34	Belz	Belz	4
35	Navahrudak	Navahrudak	2
36	Slonim	Navahrudak	2
37	Vawkavysk	Navahrudak	2
38	Płock	Płock	2
39	Vitebsk	Vitebsk	2
40	Orsha	Vitebsk	2
41	Czersk	Masovia	2
42	Warsaw	Masovia	2
43	Wizna	Masovia	2
44	Wyszogród	Masovia	2
45	Zakroczym	Masovia	2
46	Ciechanów	Masovia	2
47	Łomża	Masovia	2
48	Różan	Masovia	2
49	Liw	Masovia	2
50	Nur	Masovia	2
51	Drohiczyn	Podlachia	2
52	Bielsk Podlaski	Podlachia	2
53	Mielnik	Podlachia	2
54	Rawa Mazowiecka	Rawa Mazowiecka	2
55	Sochaczew	Rawa Mazowiecka	2
56	Gostynin	Rawa Mazowiecka	2
57	Brest-Litovsk	Brest-Litovsk	2
58	Pinsk	Brest-Litovsk	2
59	Chełmno	Chełmno	2
60	Mstsislau	Mstsislau	2
61	Malbork	Malbork	2
62	Bratslav	Bratslav	6
63	Gdańsk	Pomerania	2
64	Minsk	Minsk	2
65	Mazyr	Minsk	2
66	Rechytsa	Minsk	2
67	Livonia	Livonia	6
68	Chernihiv	Chernihiv	4

== See also ==
- Administrative division of the Polish–Lithuanian Commonwealth
- Offices in the Polish–Lithuanian Commonwealth
- Polish order of precedence
