= Prime Minister of South Korea =

Deputy head of government of South Korea

Prime Minister of the Republic of Korea
- Emblem of the prime minister

- Standard of the prime minister

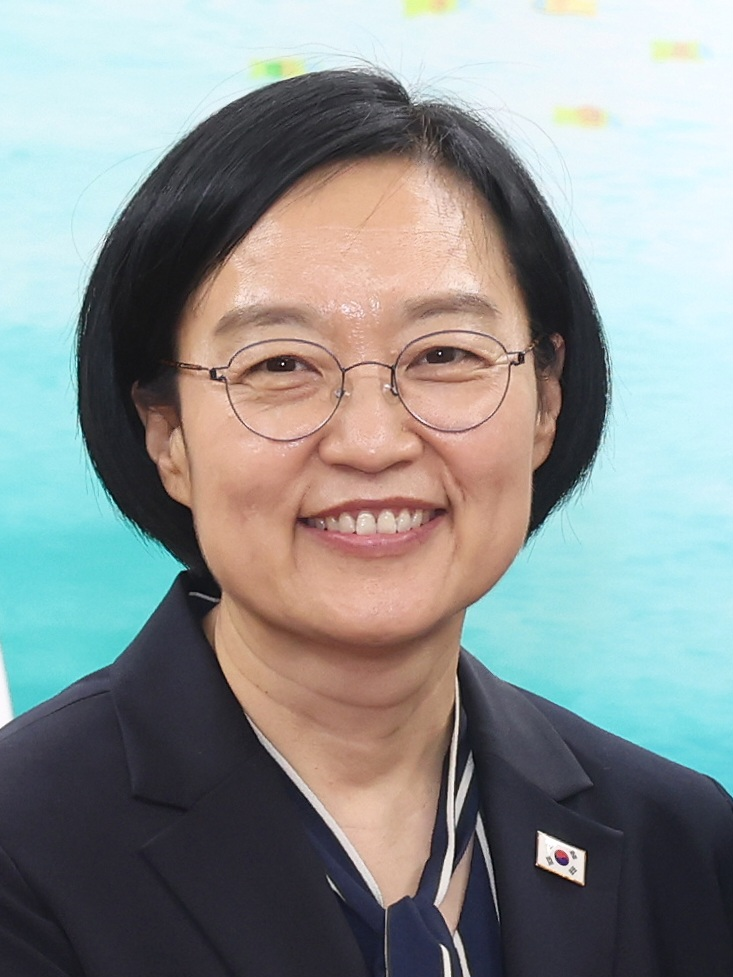
- Incumbent; Han Seong-sook since 1 July 2026
- Executive branch of the Government of South Korea; Prime Minister's Office
- Style: Ms Prime Minister (informal); The Honourable (formal); Her Excellency (diplomatic)
- Status: Deputy head of government
- Member of: State Council; National Security Council
- Residence: Chongni Gonggwan
- Seat: Sejong City
- Nominator: President
- Appointer: President (Subject to the National Assembly's approval)
- Term length: At the president's pleasure
- Constituting instrument: Constitution of South Korea
- Precursor: Prime Minister of the Provisional Government of the Republic of Korea
- Inaugural holder: Lee Beom-seok
- Formation: 31 July 1948; 78 years ago
- Unofficial names: Prime Minister of South Korea
- Deputy: Deputy Prime Minister
- Salary: ₩191,000,000 annually
- Website: Official website (in English); Official website (in Korean)

Korean name
- Hangul: 국무총리
- Hanja: 國務總理
- RR: Gungmuchongni
- MR: Kungmuch'ongni

The prime minister of the Republic of Korea (Korean: 국무총리) is the deputy head of government and the second highest political office of South Korea. The prime minister is appointed by the president of the Republic of Korea, with the National Assembly's approval. The prime minister may be a member of the National Assembly, but this is not required to hold the office.

Unlike prime ministers of parliamentary democracies, the prime minister of South Korea is not the head of government of South Korea but a senior member of the cabinet, since the president is both the head of state and head of government in the country. The prime minister is the principal executive assistant to the president, and is first in the order of succession; the prime minister assumes the presidency in acting capacity, upon the removal or incapacitation of the sitting president.

The current prime minister is Han Seong-sook, having taken office on 30 June 2026 after being appointed by President Lee Jae Myung.

== Nomenclature ==
The Sino-Korean word gungmu (국무; 國務) means "state affairs" and chongni (총리; 總理) means "prime minister", "premier" or "chancellor", so the full title in Korean means literally "Prime Minister for State Affairs", though is not used as its official English title. The short title in Korean is simply Chongni.

== History ==
The position was created on 31 July 1948, two weeks before the government of South Korea was founded, and was held by Lee Beom-seok until 1950. During the Second Republic, a parliamentary system was established and the prime minister became the most powerful position, with the president reduced to a figurehead. Chang Myon was the only prime minister elected under this system before the military coup of 1961. The office was assigned the title Chief Cabinet Minister from 1961 until 1963. The role of prime minister returned with the start of the Third Republic.

On 27 April 2014, Prime Minister Chung Hong-won announced his desire to resign. However, due to unsuccessful nominations, Chung remained in office until February 2015.

On 23 January 2015, President Park Geun-hye named Saenuri's Floor Leader Lee Wan-koo as the new prime minister. Lee was confirmed by the National Assembly as Prime Minister on 16 February 2015. However, on April 20 of the same year, he offered his resignation to the president during a bribery scandal.

== Functions ==
The prime minister is the principal executive assistant to the president, with the president being the actual head of government. The prime minister holds the second position after the president in the State Council of South Korea, which is the nominal cabinet of South Korea. The prime minister assists the president by supervising ministries, making recommendations for ministers, and serves as the vice-chairperson of the Cabinet. The prime minister is the first in the order of succession to discharge the duties of the office of the president as the acting president should the president be unable to discharge their office. The most recent prime minister to have served as Acting President is Han Duck-soo, during the suspension of Yoon Suk Yeol due to his impeachment on 14 December 2024. The role of the prime minister is more akin to the Vice President of the United States than it is to the prime ministers of parliamentary democracies.

A prime minister who has been appointed by the president but not yet confirmed by the National Assembly is informally called the acting prime minister. The term may also be applied to a prime minister who has resigned but, in the interim, remains in office in a caretaker role.

The prime minister is supported by two deputy prime ministers, one of whom acts for the prime minister in the event of an impeachment or vacancy. The prime minister of South Korea sometimes holds some professional or technological knowledge, whereas the president is always a politician.

== Removal ==
The procedure for impeachment is set out in the 10th Constitution of South Korea in 1987. And according to Article 65 Clause 1, if the president, prime minister, or other state council members violate the Constitution or other laws of official duty, the National Assembly can impeach them.

Clause 2 states the impeachment bill must be proposed by one-third and approved by a majority of members of the National Assembly for passage. This article also states that any person against whom a motion for impeachment has been passed shall be suspended from exercising their power until the impeachment has been adjudicated by the Constitutional Court of Korea, and a decision on impeachment shall not extend further than removal from public office. However, impeachment shall not exempt the person impeached from civil or criminal liability for such violations.

By the Constitutional Court Act of 1988, the Constitutional Court must make a final decision within 180 days after it receives any case for adjudication, including impeachment cases. If the respondent has already left office before the pronouncement of the decision, the case is dismissed.

In Han Duck-soo's case, the Constitutional Court of South Korea dismissed the case, thus automatically restoring him to both the prime ministership and the acting presidency.

== Prime Minister's Office ==
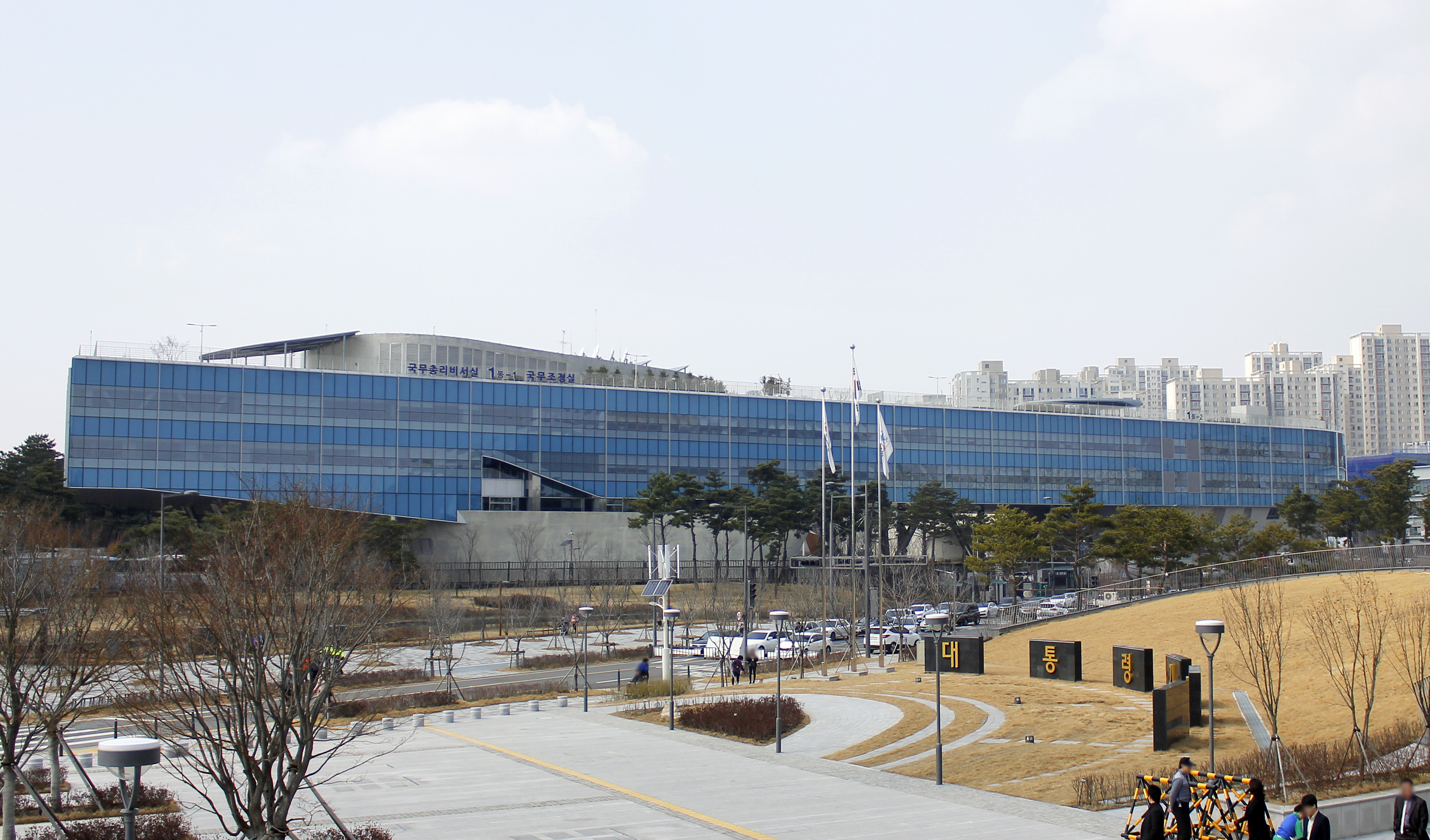
Office of the Prime Minister in Sejong City

The Prime Minister's Office consists of two organisations – the Office for Government Policy Coordination and the Prime Minister's Secretariat, which are led by a ministerial-level minister for government policy coordination and a vice-ministerial-level chief of staff to the prime minister, respectively.

Office for Government Policy Coordination assists the prime minister with:

- various tasks, responsible for directing, adjusting and overseeing central administrative authorities underneath the Prime Minister's Office;
- planning and adjusting key national policies;
- managing, analyzing and assessing policies regarding social risks, conflicts and pending problems;
- implementing regulatory reform;
- and doing other tasks specifically delegated by the prime minister.

Prime Minister's Secretariat assists the prime minister with:

- activities related to the National Assembly, responsible for matters regarding collaboration between the executive branch and the majority party in the legislature;
- providing PM with counsel on state affairs;
- matters regarding key information and situations, both domestic and international;
- management and arbitration of civil complaints;
- supporting and collaborating with civil groups;
- promoting PM's activities about state affairs;
- drafting PM's remarks and statements;
- supporting the promotion of activities by the Office for Government Policy Coordination;
- protocols and armed escort regarding PM and receiving VIPs;
- maintaining the official residence of the PM;
- and handling other matters as instructed by PM.

== Salary ==
The prime minister has a salary of US$163,000 as set by the National Assembly, along with a lifelong pension that is always given to former prime ministers.

== Residence ==
The prime minister's residence is Chongni Gonggwan. It is owned and operated by the South Korean government, and has served as the residence of the prime minister since the early 1990s, after construction was concluded and was completed around the same time as the Presidential Blue House.

== Post-premiership ==
All former prime ministers are given a lifelong pension and a Presidential Security Service detail but do not have to accept the protection if they so wish. Prime ministers, when they die, usually have a state funeral so the public and government officials, both past and present, can pay their respects.

== See also ==
- Politics of South Korea
- Premier of North Korea
- Prime Minister of the Korean Empire
- Vice President of South Korea
