= Astrid Fodor =

Romanian politician (born 1953)

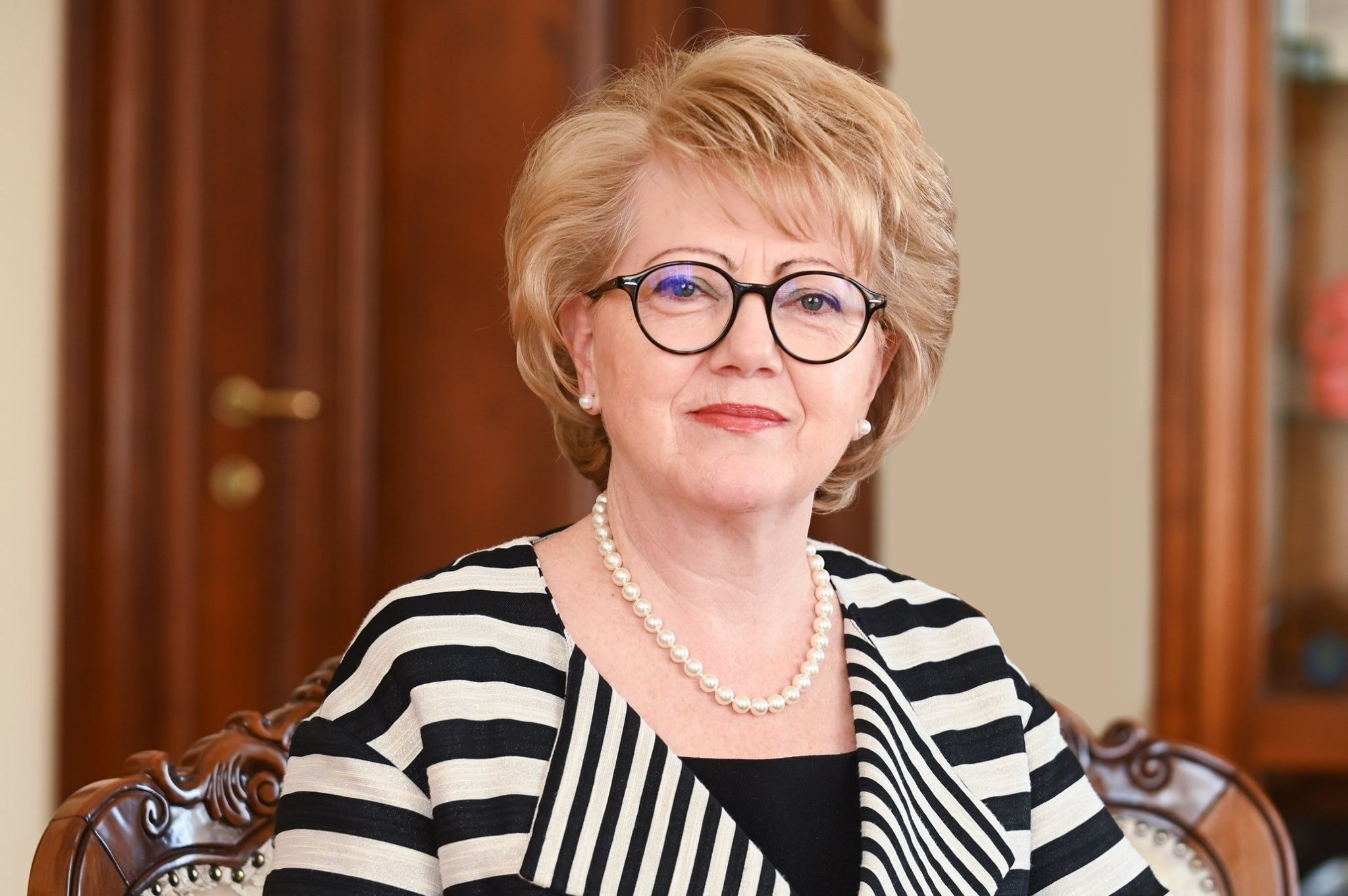
- Fodor in 2021

Mayor of Sibiu
- Incumbent
- Assumed office 2 December 2014
- Preceded by: Klaus Iohannis

Personal details
- Born: 6 November 1953 (age 72) Sibiu, Sibiu County, Socialist Republic of Romania
- Party: Democratic Forum of Germans in Romania (FDGR/DFDR)
- Spouse: Ioan Fodor
- Children: 2

Astrid Cora Fodor (born 6 November 1953) is a Romanian politician. Between 2008 and 2014, she was the Deputy Mayor of Sibiu (German: Hermannstadt), and since 2 December 2014 she has been the mayor of the town, initially ad interim as Klaus Iohannis left office for the Romanian presidency after winning the 2014 Romanian presidential election, then elected by the vast majority of the municipal councillors in 2014, and subsequently by popular vote at the 2016 and 2020 Romanian local elections.

== Education and professional activity ==
Of Transylvanian Saxon ethnicity, Fodor is a graduate of the Faculty of Administrative Law in Sibiu (German: Hermannstadt). From 1978 to 2000 she worked at the "Libertatea" fabric factory, where she performed various functions, eventually that of the commercial manager. From 2002 to 2008 she was the economic director of the Evangelical Church of the Augsburg Confession in Romania (German: Evangelische Kirche A.B. [Augsburgischen Bekenntnisses] in Rumänien).

== Political career ==
At the Romanian local elections in 2008, Fodor was elected municipal councillor on behalf of the Democratic Forum of Germans in Romania (FDGR/DFDR). Although at that time the FDGR/FDR held the absolute majority in the Sibiu Municipal Council (14 of the 23 mandates), following a meeting with the National Liberal Party (PNL), one of the two positions of deputy mayor was taken by the PNL representative while the other was ascribed to Fodor from the FDGR/DFDR. On 2 December 2014, she was elected mayor of Sibiu/Hermannstadt, with 21 votes out of the total of 23 (91%) of municipal councillors. At the local elections in 2016, Fodor was elected mayor, with 57.13% of the votes.

== Personal life ==
Fodor has two sons. She was married to Ioan Fodor (born in 1949, in Mediaș), a Romanian Orthodox priest from Cornățel village, who died of kidney failure on 1 January 2001.
