= Order of precedence in Poland =

Relative preeminence of officials for ceremonial purposes

There is no official document specifying the order of precedence in Poland. In practice, the precedence of officials in Poland is based on an outdated informal instruction dating back to 1992. Polish civil servants responsible for the protocol often need to make ad hoc decisions based on tradition, general rules of etiquette and common sense.

An official order of precedence existed during the Communist era, but it was rendered obsolete by the transition to democracy that started in 1989. In 1992, a new guideline was prepared by Prime Minister Hanna Suchocka, Foreign Minister Krzysztof Skubiszewski, and Janusz Ziółkowski, the chief of the President's chancellery. The new document, however, was never formally adopted as legally binding. Furthermore, the adoption of the current Constitution of Poland in 1997, the territorial administration reform of 1999, Poland's entry into the European Union in 2004, and other events have rendered this guideline obsolete as well.

The lack of an official regulation in this matter leaves so much ambiguity that the only office whose position in the order of precedence is generally accepted is that of the President of the Republic. In everyday usage, the precedence is often based on such criteria as: source of power (elected officials take precedence before appointed ones), position of the given office in the constitution, as well as a person's seniority and salary (better paid officials are assumed to be also more important). Many questions remain unresolved though. The marshals (speakers) of both chambers of parliament are usually considered to take precedence before the prime minister based on their position in the line of presidential succession. Opponents of this view argue that the prime minister is constitutionally more powerful and therefore should be treated as Poland's second top official. The precedence of individual ministers, as well as chiefs of chancelleries, is uncertain, as is the question of MPs' and senators' precedence before secretaries of State.

The territorial administration reform has raised the question of whether the voivode, the national government's representative in a voivodeship (region), takes precedence before the voivodeship marshal, a popularly elected head of a voivodeship, or vice versa. Similarly, with Poland's integration into the European Union, came the problem of Polish members of the European Parliament's position in the order of precedence. Another bone of contention is the position of ecclesiastical officials vis-à-vis secular ones. Traditionally, Roman Catholic clergymen are treated with great reverence in Poland and are often assigned very high – even if undue from the protocolar point of view – positions in the order of precedence.

The list below is taken from the official website of Prime Minister's Chancellery. It is based on the unofficial instruction of 1992 with later addition of several new offices created after that date. Offices that no longer exist, but are included in the list, are marked in italics.

Color key
Legislative power	Executive power	Judicial power	Other

#	English title	Polish title	Current office holders As of 6 August 2025
1.	President of the Republic of Poland	Prezydent Rzeczypospolitej Polskiej	Karol Nawrocki
2.	Marshal of the Sejm (Speaker of the lower house of parliament)	Marszałek Sejmu	Szymon Hołownia
3.	Marshal of the Senate (Speaker of the upper house of parliament)	Marszałek Senatu	Małgorzata Kidawa-Błońska
4.	President of the Council of Ministers (Prime Minister)	Prezes Rady Ministrów (Premier)	Donald Tusk
5.	Deputy Presidents of the Council of Ministers (Deputy prime ministers)	Wiceprezesi Rady Ministrów (Wicepremierzy)	Władysław Kosiniak-Kamysz; Krzysztof Gawkowski
6.	Deputy Marshals of the Sejm (Deputy speakers of the lower house of parliament)	Wicemarszałkowie Sejmu	Monika Wielichowska; Dorota Niedziela; Piotr Zgorzelski; Włodzimierz Czarzasty; Krzysztof Bosak
7.	Deputy Marshals of the Senate (Deputy speakers of the upper house of parliament)	Wicemarszałkowie Senatu	Rafał Grupiński; Magdalena Biejat; Maciej Żywno; Michał Kamiński
8.	Ministers – members of the Council of Ministers	Ministrowie – członkowie Rady Ministrów	
9.	President of the Constitutional Tribunal	Prezes Trybunału Konstytucyjnego	Bogdan Święczkowski
10.	First President of the Supreme Court (Chief Justice)	Pierwszy Prezes Sądu Najwyższego	Małgorzata Manowska
11.	President of the Supreme Administrative Court	Prezes Naczelnego Sądu Administracyjnego	Jacek Chlebny
12.	President of the Supreme Audit Office	Prezes Najwyższej Izby Kontroli	Marian Banaś
13.	Commissioner for Civil Rights Protection (Ombudsman)	Rzecznik Praw Obywatelskich	Marcin Wiącek
14.	Commissioner for Children Rights Protection (Ombudsman for Children)	Rzecznik Praw Dziecka	Monika Horna-Cieślak
15.	President of Institute of National Remembrance	Prezes Instytutu Pamięci Narodowej	Karol Nawrocki
16.	Chairpersons of Sejm committees	Przewodniczący komisji sejmowych	
17.	Chairpersons of Senate committees	Przewodniczący komisji senackich	
18.	Members of Sejm	Posłowie na Sejm	
19.	Senators	Senatorowie	
20.	Secretaries of State	Sekretarze Stanu	
21.	Chief of the Chancellery of the President of the Republic of Poland	Szef Kancelarii Prezydenta Rzeczypospolitej Polskiej	Halina Szymańska
22.	Chief of the Chancellery of the President of the Council of Ministers	Szef Kancelarii Prezesa Rady Ministrów	Jan Grabiec
23.	Chiefs of the Chancelleries of the Sejm and of the Senate	Szefowie Kancelarii Sejmu i Senatu	Jacek Cichocki (Sejm); Adam Niemczewski (Senate)
24.	Presidents of the Supreme Court	Prezesi Sądu Najwyższego	
25.	Chief of the General Staff and commanders of the branches of the Armed Forces	Szef Sztabu Generalnego i dowódcy wojsk	Wiesław Kukuła
26.	Undersecretaries of State	Podsekretarze Stanu	
27.	Voivodes (Governors)	Wojewodowie	
28.	Polish ambassadors	Polscy ambasadorowie	
29.	Presidents and chairpersons of national-level administrative offices and committees	Prezesi i przewodniczący urzędów, komitetów i komisji sprawujących funkcje naczelnych lub centralnych organów administracji państwowej	
30.	Deputy presidents and chairpersons of national-level administrative offices and committees	Zastępcy prezesów i przewodniczących urzędów, komitetów i komisji sprawujących funkcje naczelnych lub centralnych organów administracji państwowej	
31.	Directors General	Dyrektorzy generalni	
32.	Directors	Dyrektorzy	

== See also ==
- Order of precedence in the Polish–Lithuanian Commonwealth
