= 2000 Romanian elections =

2000 Romanian elections may refer to:

- 2000 Romanian general election
- 2000 Romanian local elections
