= 2021 President of the Chamber of Deputies of Romania election =

2021 election of the president of the Chamber of Deputies
- 23 November 2021
- Turnout: 90.30%
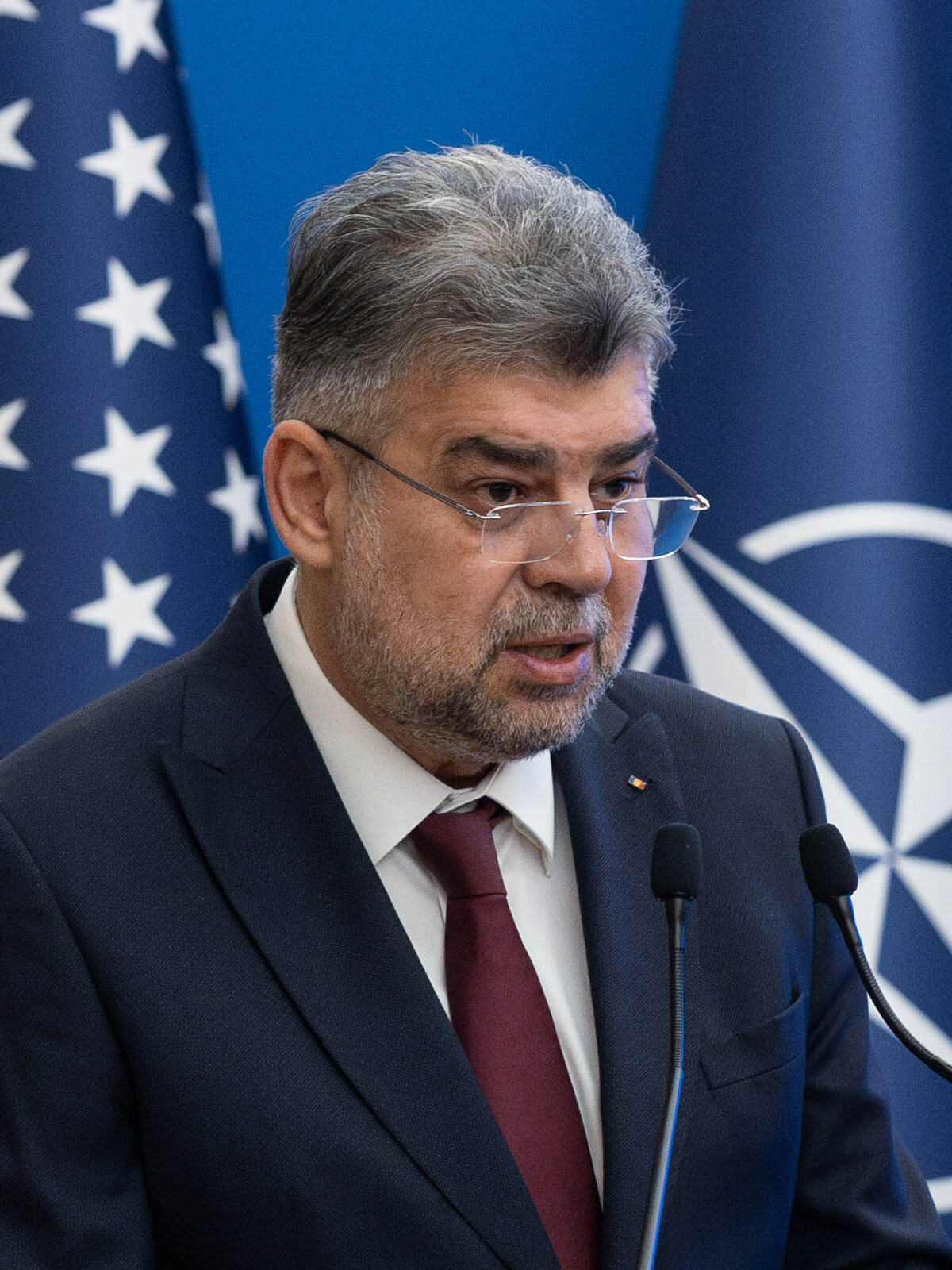

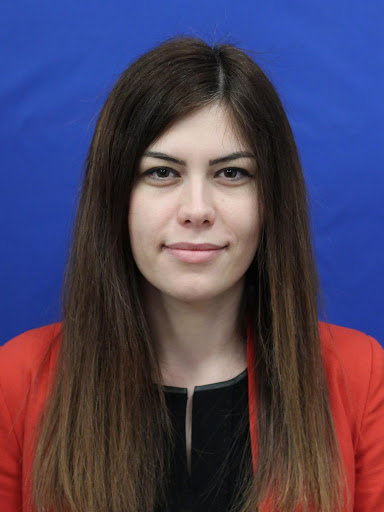
Nominee	Marcel Ciolacu	Cristina Prună
Party	PSD (supported by PNL and UDMR/RMDSZ)	USR (supported by FD)
Popular vote	216	77
Percentage	73.73%	26.27%
President before election
Ludovic Orban (before October 2021)
PNL
Elected President
Marcel Ciolacu
PSD

Elections for the president of the Chamber of Deputies of Romania took place on 23 November 2021. The previous president, Ludovic Orban, elected in 2020, resigned on 13 October 2021 after losing the presidency of the PNL to Florin Cîțu, in the midst of the 2021 Romanian political crisis.

The PSD candidate Marcel Ciolacu, supported by the PNL and the UDMR/RMDSZ as part of the then-new parliamentary majority, became the new Chamber president.

== Electoral system ==
The president of the Chamber of Deputies is elected by secret ballot with the majority of votes of the deputies. If none of the candidates receives the absolute majority of votes, the first two compete again in a second ballot, and the one with most of the votes wins.

== Results ==
Candidate	Party	Support	Votes	%
Marcel Ciolacu	PSD	PNL, UDMR/RMDSZ	216	65.46%
Cristina Prună	USR	FD	77	23.34%
Abstentions	AUR	-	32	9.69%
Did not vote	—N/a	-	5	1.51%
Total			330	100.00%
