= Order of precedence in Romania =

Relative preeminence of officials for ceremonial purposes

The order of precedence in Romania is a symbolic hierarchy of officials in Romania used to direct protocol. It is written in Article 98 of the Romanian Constitution.

1. President (Nicușor Dan)
2. President of the Senate (Mircea Abrudean)
3. President of the Chamber of Deputies (Sorin Grindeanu)
4. Prime Minister (Ilie Bolojan)

The two presidents of the Houses of Parliament are seconded by their vice-presidents.

During the time the President of the Senate, or the President of the Chamber of Deputies if that case appears, holds ad interim the office of President, it is customary for one of the Vice-presidents of the respective House of Parliament to perform the duties of the President of that house. This does not mean that the Vice-president holds the office interim, as the seat is not vacant. Such "acting" Vice-president was for the Senate Doru Ioan Tărăcilă in April - May 2007, and Petru Filip in July - August 2012.
