= Order of precedence in South Korea =

Relative preeminence of officials for ceremonial purposes

The Republic of Korea has no officially recognized South Korean order of precedence, yet the Office of the President (EOP) once officially declared order of precedence among the chiefs of 6 highest constitutional institutions in year 2006 as following:

1. the President of the Republic of Korea, as both head of state and leader of government
2. the Speaker of the National Assembly, as leader of legislature
3. the Chief Justice of the Supreme Court and the President of the Constitutional Court, as co-leader of the judiciary
4. the Prime Minister, as deputy leader of government
5. the Chairperson of the National Election Commission, as leader of the constitutionally independent agency for national election administration

== History ==
Before democratization in 1987, South Korea traditionally maintained a term Sambuyoin (Korean: 삼부요인; Hanja: 三府要人; lit. 'VIPs from three branches of the government') which depicts the Speaker of the National Assembly, the Chief Justice of the Supreme Court and the Prime Minister, as symbol for tripartite separation of powers. This term was usually used when the President of the Republic of Korea invites Sambu-Yoin to important national ceremonies, regarding the President of the Republic of Korea as a somewhat higher office distinguished from each three branches of the government, which is represented by the Sambu-Yoin.

After democratization, South Korea established the Constitutional Court of Korea as constitutional court independent from the old Supreme Court. Yet the exact position of the President of the Constitutional Court inside the order of precedence among Sambu-Yoin remained as potential question. Some of writers tried to call chiefs of highest constitutional institutions other than the President of the Republic of Korea, including the Constitutional Court and the National Election Committee (NEC), as Sabuyoin (사부요인; lit. 'VIPs from four branches of the government') or Obuyoin (오부요인; lit. 'VIPs from five branches of the government'), as regarding the Constitutional Court as fourth branch and the National Election Committee as fifth branch of the government, even though South Korea had never regarded the Constitutional Court and the National Election Committee as separated branch of government. This continued disorder got escalated when the EOP tried to demote protocol rank of the President of the Constitutional Court under the Prime Minister, when the Constitutional Court made several decisions nullifying policies of the national President around 2004-2006. The President of the Constitutional Court boycotted some of national ceremonies to oppose such demotion, and the EOP had no choice but to restore the rank of the constitutional court President over the Prime Minister.

So in 2006, EOP declared that 5 chiefs of highest constitutional institutions other than the national President as following order: the Speaker comes first as leader of legislature, and both of the supreme court Chief and the constitutional court President comes second as co-leader of judiciary. Following rank was given to the Prime Minister as deputy leader of executive branch, and the Chair of NEC got the bottom rank as head of constitutionally independent agency. An also at the same time, EOP declared that Sabuyoin or Obuyoin is not a legally correct term, since South Korea is a country with a tripartite system of power separation by the Constitution, not a Five-Power Constitution as Taiwan. The EOP suggested using term 'Sambuyoin plus the head of constitutional institution' (삼부요인 및 헌법기관장).

== Current office holders of highest constitutional institutions ==
No.	Office	Image	Incumbent	In office since	Political role
1st	President of the Republic of Korea		Lee Jae-myung	4 June 2025	The head of state and the leader of executive branch
2nd	Speaker of the National Assembly		Cho Jeong-sik	5 June 2026	Sambu-Yoin representing the leader of legislature
3rd	Chief Justice of the Supreme Court		Cho Hee-dae	8 December 2023	Sambu-Yoin representing the co-leader of judiciary
3rd	President of the Constitutional Court		Kim Sanghwan	24 July 2025	Sambu-Yoin representing the co-leader of judiciary
4th	Prime Minister of the Republic of Korea		Han Seong-sook	1 July 2026	Sambu-Yoin representing the deputy leader of executive branch
5th	Chairperson of the National Election Commission		Rho Tae-ak	17 May 2022	leader of constitutionally independent agency for election administration

== Detailed order ==
The following list is not an officially recognized South Korean order of precedence, yet conventionally used by writers and reporters.

1. President of the Republic of Korea
2. Speaker of the National Assembly
3. Chief Justice of the Supreme Court and President of the Constitutional Court
4. Prime Minister
5. Chairperson of the National Election Commission
6. Chair of the Board of Audit and Inspection
7. Leaders of the parties represented in the National Assembly
  1. Leader of the ruling party
  2. Leaders of the oppositions
8. Deputy Speakers of the National Assembly (2)
9. Cabinet ministers (17)
  1. Deputy Prime Ministers (2)
    1. Minister of Economy and Finance (Deputy Prime Minister of Economy ex officio)
    2. Minister of Education (Deputy Prime Minister of Social Affairs ex officio)
  2. Other ministers of the Cabinet (15)
    1. Minister of Foreign Affairs
    2. Minister of Reunification of Korea
    3. Minister of Justice
    4. Minister of National Defense
    5. Minister of Interior and Safety
    6. Minister of Culture, Sports and Tourism
    7. Minister of Agriculture, Food and Rural Affairs
    8. Minister of Trade, Industry and Energy
    9. Minister of Health and Welfare
    10. Minister of Environment
    11. Minister of Employment and Labor
    12. Minister of Gender Equality and Family
    13. Minister of Land, Infrastructure and Transport
    14. Minister of Oceans and Fisheries
    15. Minister of Small Businesses and Startups
10. Floor leaders in the National Assembly
  1. Floor leader of the ruling party
  2. Floor leaders of the oppositions
11. Chairs of the standing committees of the National Assembly (18)
  1. Chair of the House Steering Committee
  2. Chair of the Legislation and Judiciary Committee
  3. Chair of the National Policy Committee
  4. Chair of the National Strategy and Finance Committee
  5. Chair of the Education Committee
  6. Chair of the Science, Technology, Broadcasting and Communications Committee
  7. Chair of the Foreign Affairs and Reunification Committee
  8. Chair of the National Defense Committee
  9. Chair of the Public Administration and Security Committee
  10. Chair of the Culture, Sports and Tourism Committee
  11. Chair of the Agriculture, Food, Rural Affairs, Oceans and Fisheries Committee
  12. Chair of the Trade, Industry, Energy, Small Businesses and Startups Committee
  13. Chair of the Health and Welfare Committee
  14. Chair of the Environment and Labor Committee
  15. Chair of the Land, Infrastructure and Transport Committee
  16. Chair of the Intelligence Committee
  17. Chair of the Gender Equality and Family Committee
  18. Chair of the Special Committee on Budget and Accounts
12. Justices of the Supreme Court () and Justices of the Constitutional Court (8) (each In seniority of tenure)
13. Chiefs of agencies reporting to the Presidents (5)
  1. Director of the National Intelligence Service
  2. Chief Presidential Secretary
  3. Chair of the National Security Council
  4. Commissioner of the Broadcasting and Telecommunication
  5. Chief of the Presidential Security Service
14. Prosecutor General
15. Chief of the National Assembly Secretariat
16. Chiefs of agencies reporting to the Prime Minister (9)
17. Chair of the Joint Chiefs of Staff ()
18. Chief of Staff of the Armed Forces (3)
  1. Chief of Staff of the Army ()
  2. Chief of Staff of the Navy ()
  3. Chief of Staff of the Air Force ()
19. Operation commanders (In seniority of tenure)
  1. Deputy Commander of ROK-US Combined Forces Command
  2. Ground Operations Commander
  3. Second Operations Commander
20. Commander of the Marine Corps ()
21. Members of the National Assembly (In seniority of tenure)

== See also ==
- Constitution of South Korea
- Politics of South Korea
- Order of precedence
- Constitutional institution
