= Order of precedence in Singapore =

Relative preeminence of officials for ceremonial purposes

The Singapore order of precedence is a nominal and symbolic hierarchy of important positions within the Government of Singapore. It has no legal standing but is used to dictate ceremonial protocol at events of a national nature. The official list was gazetted in 1967.

== Order of precedence ==
Rank	Position	Name
1	President	Tharman Shanmugaratnam
2	Prime Minister	Lawrence Wong
3	Former Prime Minister Senior Minister	Lee Hsien Loong
4	Deputy Prime Minister	Gan Kim Yong
5	Chief Justice	Sundaresh Menon
6	Speaker of Parliament	Seah Kian Peng
7	Former Presidents	Tony Tan Halimah Yacob
8	Former Prime Minister	Goh Chok Tong
9	Cabinet Ministers	see here
9A	Senior Ministers of State	see here
9B	Ministers of State	see here
9C	Senior Parliamentary Secretaries	see here
10	Foreign High Commissioners and Ambassadors to Singapore	see here
10A	Singapore High Commissioners and Ambassadors	see here
10B	Chargés d'affaires	see here
11	Awardees of the Order of Temasek	
12	Attorney-General	Lucien Wong
13	Chairman of the Public Service Commission	Lee Tzu Yang
14	Supreme Court Judges	see here
14A	State Court Judges	see here
15	Deputy Speaker of Parliament	see here
16	Parliamentary Secretaries	see here
17	Members of Parliament	see here
