= Order of precedence in Jamaica =

Relative preeminence of officials for ceremonial purposes

The Jamaican order of precedence is as follows:

1. Charles III, King of Jamaica
2. Governor-General of Jamaica (Sir Patrick Allen)
3. Prime Minister of Jamaica (Andrew Holness)
4. Deputy Prime Minister of Jamaica (Horace Chang)
5. Leader of the Opposition (Mark Golding)

Members of the Cabinet and Ministers of State

1. President of the Senate (Tom Tavares-Finson, KC)
2. Speaker of the House of Representatives (Juliet Holness)
3. Chief Justice of Jamaica, Bryan Sykes; President of the Court of Appeal
4. President of the Jamaica Council of Churches
5. Attorney General (Derrick McKoy)
6. Head of the Civil Service, Head of the Foreign Service, Ambassadors, High Commissioners, Head of the European Union delegation, Ministers, Envoys
7. Parliamentary Secretaries
8. Members of the Privy Council
9. Judges of the Court of Appeal and the Supreme Court
10. Deputy President of the Senate
11. Deputy Speaker of the House of Representatives
12. Members of the Senate
13. Members of the House of Representatives
14. Mayors and Chairmen of Parish Councils (except on municipal occasions, when they take precedence immediately after the Prime Minister)
15. Chief of Staff of the Jamaica Defence Force; Commissioner of Police
16. Custodes of Parishes
17. Governor of the Bank of Jamaica, Financial Secretary, Auditor General, Permanent Secretaries, Director of Public Prosecutions, Solicitor General, Chairman of the Public Service Commission
18. Heads of International Organisations
19. Vice-Chancellor of the University of the West Indies
20. Chairman and Secretaries of the Political Parties having representation in Parliament

A slightly different version of the Order of Precedence is given on the website of the Office of the Prime Minister of Jamaica:

1. Governor-General of Jamaica (Sir Patrick Allen)
2. Prime Minister of Jamaica (Andrew Holness)
3. Deputy Prime Minister (Horace Chang)
4. Leader of the Opposition (Peter Phillips)
5. Members of the Cabinet; President of the Senate; Speaker of the House of Representatives
6. Former Governors-General and former Prime Ministers
7. Chief Justice of Jamaica; President of the Court of Appeal
8. Ministers of State
9. President of the Jamaica Council of Churches
10. Widows and Widowers of National Heroes; Widows and Widowers of former Governors-General; Widows and Widowers of former Heads of Government
11. Attorney-General (Derrick McKoy)
12. Cabinet Secretary (Head of the Civil Service)
13. Head of the Foreign Service; Dean of the Diplomatic Corps; Ambassadors and High Commissioners; Head of Delegation of the European Union; Secretary-General of the International Seabed Authority
14. Members of the Privy Council
15. Deputy President of the Senate
16. Deputy Speaker of the House of Representatives
17. Members of the Senate; Members of the House of Representatives
18. Judges of the Court of Appeal; Judges of the Supreme Court
19. Chairman of the Public Service Commission
20. Chief of Staff of the Jamaica Defence Force; Commissioner of Police
21. Mayors and Chairmen of Parish Councils (except on municipal occasions, when they take precedence immediately after the Prime Minister)
22. Custodes of Parishes
23. Chief of State Protocol
24. Resident Representative or Resident Coordinator of the United Nations Development Programme; Heads of Offices of International Organisations; Consuls-General; Members of the Consular Corps
25. Vice-Chancellor of the University of the West Indies
26. Chairman and Secretaries of the Political Parties having representation in Parliament
