= Order of precedence in Chile =

Relative preeminence of officials for ceremonial purposes

The Chilean order of precedence is currently prescribed by the Public Ceremonial and Protocol Regulation. This regulation establishes the order of precedence of national official activities as well as common regulations to activities organized by provinces and regions. The general order established by the decree is modified if the event takes place elsewhere in Chile instead of in Santiago Metropolitan Region.

== Order of precedence in the Metropolitan Region ==
1. The President of the Republic (Gabriel Boric)
2. The President of the Senate (José García Ruminot)
3. The President of the Supreme Court (Ricardo Blanco Herrera)
4. The President of the Chamber of Deputies (Karol Cariola)
5. The former presidents of Chile
  1. Eduardo Frei Ruiz-Tagle
  2. Ricardo Lagos Escobar
  3. Michelle Bachelet Jeria
6. The Archbishop of Santiago (Fernando Chomalí Garib)
7. The President of the Episcopal Conference (René Rebolledo Salinas)
8. The Cardinals of the Catholic Church
  1. Francisco Javier Errázuriz Ossa
  2. Ricardo Ezzati Andrello
  3. Celestino Aós Braco
9. A high representative of the Evangelical Churches (Alfred Cooper Rickards)
10. The President of the Constitutional Court of Chile (Daniela Marzi Muñoz)
11. The Comptroller General of the Republic (Dorothy Pérez Gutiérrez)
12. The National Prosecutor of the Public Ministry (Ángel Valencia Vásquez)
13. The President of the Central Bank (Rosanna Costa Costa)
14. The President of the Election Qualifying Court (Arturo Prado Puga)
15. The President of the Directive Council of the Electoral Service (Andrés Tagle Domínguez)
16. The Minister of the Interior and Public Security (Carolina Tohá Morales)
17. The Minister of Foreign Affairs (Alberto van Klaveren Stork)
18. The Minister of National Defense (Maya Fernández Allende)
19. The Minister of Finance (Mario Marcel Cullell)
20. The Minister General Secretariat of the Presidency (Álvaro Elizalde Soto)
21. The Minister General Secretariat of Government (Camila Vallejo Dowling)
22. The Minister of Economy, Development and Tourism (Nicolás Grau Veloso)
23. The Minister of Social Development and Family (Javiera Toro Cáceres)
24. The Minister of Education (Nicolás Cataldo)
25. The Minister of Justice and Human Rights (Jaime Gajardo Falcón)
26. The Minister of Labor and Social Provision (Jeannette Jara Román)
27. The Minister of Public Works (Jessica López Saffie)
28. The Minister of Health (Ximena Aguilera Sanhueza)
29. The Minister of Housing and Urbanism (Carlos Montes Cisternas)
30. The Minister of Agriculture (Esteban Valenzuela Van Treek)
31. The Minister of Mining (Aurora Williams)
32. The Minister of Transport and Telecommunications (Juan Carlos Muñoz)
33. The Minister of National Assets (Francisco Figueroa Cerda)
34. The Minister of Energy (Diego Pardow Lorenzo)
35. The Minister for the Environment (Maisa Rojas Corradi)
36. The Minister of Sports (Jaime Pizarro Herrera)
37. The Minister of Women and Gender Equality (Antonia Orellana Guarello)
38. The Minister of Cultures, Arts and Heritage (Carolina Arredondo)
39. The Minister of Science, Technology, Knowledge and Innovation (Aisén Etcheverry)
40. The Dean of the Diplomatic Corps (The Apostolic Nuncio actually vacant)
41. Foreign ambassadors (by order of precedence)
42. The Commander-in-chief of the Chilean Army (Javier Iturriaga del Campo)
43. The Commander-in-chief of the Chilean Navy (Juan Andrés de la Maza Larraín)
44. The Commander-in-chief of the Chilean Air Force (Hugo Rodríguez González)
45. The General Director of Carabineros de Chile (Marcelo Araya Zapata)
46. The Director General of the Investigations Police of Chile (Eduardo Cerna Lozano)
47. The Chief of the Joint Chiefs of Defence (Pablo Niemann Figari)
48. The Vice President of the Senate (Matías Walker)
49. The Vice Presidents of the Chamber of Deputies
  1. The First Vice President (Gaspar Rivas)
  2. The Second Vice President (Eric Aedo)
50. The Senators (by alphabetical order)
51. The Members and the Prosecutor of the Supreme Court
52. The Members of the Constitutional Court
