= 2020 President of the Chamber of Deputies of Romania election =

2020 election of the president of the Chamber of Deputies
- 22 December 2020
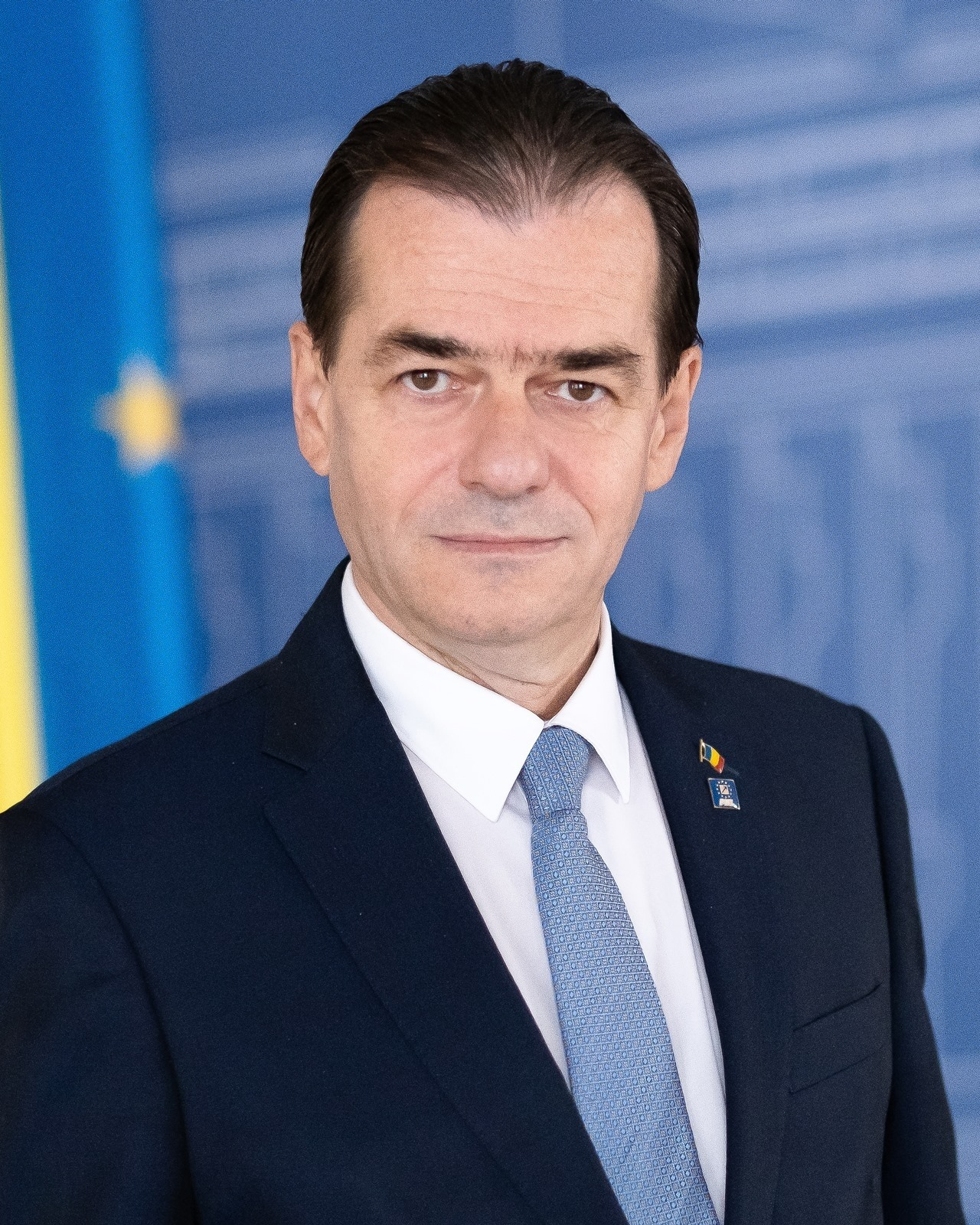

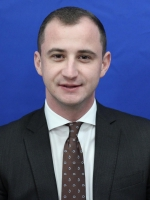
Nominee	Ludovic Orban	Alfred Simonis
Party	PNL	PSD
Popular vote	179	110
Percentage	61.93%	38.07%
President of the Chamber of Deputies of Romania before election
Marcel Ciolacu
PSD
Elected President of the Chamber of Deputies of Romania
Ludovic Orban
PNL

Elections for the president of the Chamber of Deputies of Romania took place on 22 December 2020. The PNL candidate Ludovic Orban was elected with 179 votes, while his PSD opponent Alfred Simonis received 110 votes.

== Electoral system ==
The president of the Chamber of Deputies is elected by secret ballot with the majority of votes of the deputies. If none of the candidates receives the absolute majority of votes, the first two compete again in a second ballot, and the one with most of the votes wins.
