= Order of precedence in Japan (Imperial family) =

Relative preeminence of officials for ceremonial purposes

Order of precedence in Japan as of 2026:

The order of precedence in Japan is mostly for the Imperial Family. According to the Imperial Household Agency, there is no specific rules regulating the order of precedence. On occasions when most adult members of the Imperial Family need to attend, the order of precedence is decided according to previous customs and the regulations before WWII.

The Imperial Household Law published in 1889 regulated the order of precedence according to the titles held by Imperial Family members. According to the law, the order of precedence was as follows:

1. The Empress (皇后, kōgō)
  1. Empress Masako
2. The Grand Empress Dowager (太皇太后, tai-kōtaigō)
  1. N/A
3. The Empress Dowager (皇太后, kōtaigō)
  1. Equivalence: Michiko, Empress Emerita
    (special case as she is not an empress dowager but an empress emerita 上皇后, jōkōgō)
4. The Crown Prince (皇太子, kōtaishi)
  1. Equivalence: Fumihito, The Crown Prince Akishino (holds the title kōshi, 皇嗣 rather than kōtaishi as the brother of the emperor)
5. The Crown Princess (皇太子妃, kōtaishihi)
  1. Equivalence: Kiko, The Crown Princess Akishino (holds the title kōshihi, 皇嗣妃)
6. the heir apparent to the throne who is the grandson of the Emperor (皇太孫, kōtaisōn)
  1. N/A
7. the consort to the previous member (皇太孫妃, kōtaisōnhi)
  1. N/A
8. princes who are the sons and grandsons of an emperor (親王, shinnō), princesses consort to the previous princes (親王妃, shinnōhi ), blood princess who are the daughters and granddaughters of an emperor (内親王, naishinnō), princes who are the great-grandsons of an emperor or farther down the lineage (王, ō), princesses consort to the previous princes (王妃, ōhi), and blood princesses who are the great-granddaughters of an emperor or farther down the lineage (女王, joō)
  1. Prince (親王, shinnō) (Excluded: Crown Prince Akishino, who holds the title shinnō, listed above)
    1. Prince Hisahito of Akishino
    2. Masahito, The Prince Hitachi
  2. Princess (親王妃, shinnōhi ) (Excluded: Crown Princess Akishino, who holds the title shinnōhi, listed above)
    1. Hanako, The Princess Hitachi
    2. Nobuko, Princess Tomohito of Mikasa
    3. Hisako, The Princess Takamado
  3. Princess (内親王, naishinnō)
    1. Aiko, The Princess Toshi
    2. Princess Kako of Akishino
  4. Prince (王, ō)
    1. N/A
  5. Princess (王妃, ōhi)
    1. N/A
  6. Princess (女王, joō)
    1. Princess Akiko of Mikasa
    2. Princess Yoko of Mikasa
    3. Princess Tsuguko of Takamado

This regulation targeted 皇族 (Kōzoku), which translated to English as members of the Imperial Family. In Japanese, the range of Kōzoku are the members of the Imperial Family that exclude the Emperor. According to the Emperor Abdication Law, the range of 皇族 exclude the Emperor Emeritus (上皇, jōkō) and include the Empress Emerita Empress Emerita (上皇后, jōkōgō). The Empress Emerita is seen as equivalent to the Empress Dowager, thus ranking below the Empress.

The order of precedence in Japan does not list male and female members separately.

The Imperial Household Law (1889) did not make specific regulations regarding the order of precedence of princes and princesses. However, according to custom, the princes are ranked in accordance with their positions in the line of succession to the throne. The consorts rank behind their husbands. The blood princesses are ranked as if they are princes and siblings are ranked in terms of seniority.
