= Cristina Prună =

Romanian politician (born 1984)

- Cristina Prună outside the Parliament in 2017

Member of the Chamber of Deputies
- Incumbent
- Assumed office 21 December 2016
- Constituency: Bucharest

Personal details
- Born: 11 December 1984 (age 41)
- Party: Save Romania Union

Cristina-Mădălina Prună (born 11 December 1984) is a Romanian politician of the Save Romania Union serving as a member of the Chamber of Deputies. She was first elected in the 2016 election, and was re-elected in 2020. In October 2021, she was proposed as minister of energy in the rejected cabinet of Dacian Cioloș. She was the candidate of the Save Romania Union for president of the Chamber of Deputies in the 2021 election.
