= 2023 Atacama Region teachers' strike =

Education strike in Chile

The 2023 Atacama Region teachers' strike was a major education strike compromising public education workers in Chile's Atacama Region. At its height it left 30,000 students without classes and lasted from early September to late November 2023, almost three months. Students were however without classes since August 29 due to prior but brief nation-wide teachers' strike. The strike ended following a prolonged period of negotiations between teachers' union and the Ministry of Education.

== Course of events ==
On September 4, 2023 teachers' union of Atacama Region in Chile decided to go on strike over complains about the financing and infrastructure of the newly established Local Public Education Service (Spanish: Servicio Local de Educación or SLEP). In total, 46 schools were affected by the strike. About 30,000 students were left without classes as result of the strike.

On November 9, following negotiations with the Ministry of Education the teachers' union of Atacama decided to end the strike Minister of education Nicolás Cataldo visited a series of localities of Atacama Region on November 13 to meet teachers which was of the demands agreed upon. However, on November 17 teachers declared that the strike would continue as the Ministry of Education had not fulfilled all the points of the previous agreements. Finally, the teachers' union decided to end the strike on November 20 with the return to classes occurring next few days.

The strike lasted a total of 87 days.

As a result of the strike, the end of the school year was postponed to December 31, 2023, while the school year of 2024 was proposed to begin with an additional academic term aimed at recovering subjects that could not be taught in 2023. Some education academics such as José Joaquín Brunner expressed concern for the damage the strike caused to the education in Atacama Region.

Atacama Region was the region whose students averaged the lowest score in the Chilean college admission test in 2023.
