= National Environment Commission (Chile) =

- Comisión Nacional del Medio Ambiente

Agency overview
- Formed: March 9, 1994
- Dissolved: October 1, 2010; 15 years ago
- Superseding agencies: Superintendence of the Environment (SMA); Ministry for the Environment (MMA); Environmental Assessment Service (SEA)
- Headquarters: Santiago, Chile
- Parent department: Ministry General Secretariat of the Presidency

The National Environment Commission (Spanish: Comisión Nacional del Medio Ambiente, Conama) was created on 9 March 1994 after the releasing of the Law N°19,300 under the government of Patricio Aylwin. Its first CEO was José Goñi.

On 1 October 2010, President Sebastián Piñera transformed the commission in the Ministry for the Environment.

== List of representatives ==
Minister	Party	Term start	Term end	President
Ana Lya Uriarte	PS	26 March 2007	11 March 2010	Michelle Bachelet
María Ignacia Benítez	UDI	11 March 2010	1 October 2010	Sebastián Piñera
