= Marco Cariola =

Chilean lawyer and politician (1932–2020)

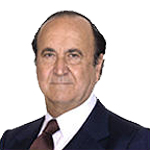

Member of the Senate of Chile
- In office 11 March 1998 – 11 March 2006
- Preceded by: Enrique Larre
- Succeeded by: Andrés Allamand
- Constituency: 16th Circumscription

Personal details
- Born: 2 January 1929 Santiago, Chile
- Died: 6 September 2020 (aged 91) Santiago, Chile
- Party: Independent Democratic Union
- Spouse: María Mónica Cubillos
- Children: Three
- Parent(s): Carlos Guillermo Cariola; Mimí Barroilhet
- Education: University of Chile (LLB)
- Occupation: Politician
- Profession: Lawyer

Marco Antonio Juan Andrés Cariola Barroilhet (2 November 1932 – 6 September 2020) was a Chilean lawyer and politician who served as a Senator.

A politician of the Independent Democratic Union, he served as senator for the Seventeenth Senatorial District, Northern Los Lagos Region, for the period 1998–2006.

== Early life and family ==
Cariola was born in Viña del Mar on 2 November 1932. He was the son of Carlos Guillermo Cariola and Mimí Barroilhet.

He married Mónica Cubillos Sallato, with whom he had three children.

He was the uncle of Marcela Cubillos, former member of the Chamber of Deputies, former Minister of Education and Environment, former constitutional convention delegate, and later a candidate for mayor of Las Condes.

== Professional career ==
He completed his primary and secondary education at The Grange School and Saint George's College. After finishing school, he entered the University of Chile, where he qualified as a lawyer in 1960.

He practiced law independently in Santiago and promoted the creation of the firm Abogados Cariola y Cía., contributing as a principal partner to the development of the firm Sargent and Krahn, patent and trademark attorneys. He later served as president and manager of the economic group Inversiones Pathfinder S.A.

He also served as controlling shareholder and president of several companies, including Masisa S.A., Forestal Tornagaleones S.A., Portuaria Corral, Pesquera Elcomar, Campo Chileno, Iansagro S.A., Agrofruta S.A., Empresas IANSA, Gasco S.A., Carrefour S.A., and Nestlé S.A., among others.

In addition, he was engaged in agricultural activities on his livestock properties in the Los Lagos Region.

== Political career ==
During the military regime led by Augusto Pinochet, Cariola served as president of the Commission for Debureaucratization. Subsequently, during the governments of Patricio Aylwin and Eduardo Frei Ruiz-Tagle, he joined the Joint Commission on International Relations.

In 1998, when Pinochet was detained in London, he traveled to the city on several occasions to support the legal defense efforts and to coordinate actions aimed at British public opinion.

Cariola died in Santiago on 6 September 2020.
