= Harald Beyer =

Harald Beyer may refer to:

- Harald Beyer (literary historian) (1891–1960), Norwegian literary historian
- Harald Beyer (politician) (born 1964), Chilean politician
