= 55th Munich Security Conference =

The 55th Munich Security Conference (MSC 2019) took place from 15 to 17 February 2019 at the Hotel Bayerischer Hof in Munich. Among the 600 participants were heads of state and government from more than 35 countries, 50 foreign and 30 defence ministers, other representatives from the fields of politics, the military, the arms industry, business and science, as well as members of international intergovernmental and civil society organizations.

== Welcome ==
The chairman of the conference Wolfgang Ischinger opened the event with the motto "The Great Puzzle: Who Will Pick Up the Pieces?" The question was also discussed in the "Munich Security Report," the annual publication accompanying the event. Ischinger described "a reorganization of central building blocks of the international order," characterized by a new era of Great Power rivalries between the USA, China and Russia as well as a certain leadership vacuum in the "liberal world order." Prior to this, he had emphasized the importance of multilateralism in today's world and described the European Union in this context as "alive and kicking."

== Opening statements ==
Federal Defence Minister Ursula von der Leyen and British Defence Minister Gavin Williamson spoke at the opening. Both politicians advocated greater European cooperation in defence. Williamson highlighted the growing global threats and stressed the importance of the continued close cooperation of NATO partners despite Brexit, as NATO is indispensable for the protection of citizens. Von der Leyen spoke of "the Great Powers returning to rivalry," which also affected Germany and Europe. She declared that she would continue to support closer military cooperation between the EU and the United Kingdom even after Brexit.

Among the main topics of the conference were "the self-assertion of the European Union, transatlantic cooperation and the possible effects of a new era of competition between major powers." When discussing European security, the European NATO members' defence budgets were also discussed. Other topics included the security situation in the Sahel, Eastern Europe, Southeastern Europe, the Middle East and Syria, and non-proliferation of nuclear weapons and trade barriers.

== International cooperation ==
During a panel discussion on the future of defence alliances, Japanese Foreign Minister Tarō Kōno called for greater international cooperation for the protection of the international order: "If the U.S. can no longer act alone as a policeman, Japan, Europe and other like-minded countries will have to increase burden-sharing." Other participants in the discussion, however, expressed doubts as to whether cooperating Central Powers would be able to stand their ground against competing goals of the Great Powers.

Iranian Foreign Minister Mohammad Javad Zarif criticized the USA's demand to the Europeans to withdraw from the nuclear agreement with Iran and urged the European states to make a greater effort to preserve the agreement.

== Intermediate-Range Nuclear Forces Treaty (INF) ==
Another focus of the conference was the INF Treaty. The speeches of Vice President of the United States Mike Pence and Russian Foreign Minister Sergey Lavrov made it clear that the failure of the INF Treaty could hardly be prevented. NATO Secretary General Jens Stoltenberg described the consequences of a failure of the INF Treaty as "very serious." In order to save the treaty, some participants expressed the hope that China would participate in the negotiations on medium-range nuclear systems, but this was rejected by foreign chief of the Chinese Communist Party (CCP) Yang Jiechi, as China rejects a "multilateralisation of the INF Treaty for the Asia-Pacific region." India expressed similar sentiments. Chancellor Merkel warned against "blind rearmament" should the INF Treaty fail.

== Transatlantic relations ==
When discussing transatlantic relations, observers described "rifts between the USA and Germany." These were also evident in the speech by Vice President Mike Pence, who defended US policy and called on European states to give the US more support in conflicts with Iran or the Nord Stream 2 gas pipeline project. NATO Secretary General Stoltenberg emphasized the importance of multilateral structures and transatlantic cooperation in his speech. German Chancellor Angela Merkel also emphasized the importance of international cooperation: "We must not break this up." Within the US delegation, opinions were divided. Former US Vice President Joe Biden, for example, was very critical of the current president's policies: "This will pass! We'll be back!"

== Climate change and security ==
For the first time since the conference was founded, a panel discussion on the topic of "Climate Change and Security" was included in the conference's main programme. The German climate researcher Hans Joachim Schellnhuber warned sternly about the consequences of climate change. Bunny McDiarmid, co-managing director of Greenpeace, explained the European Fridays for Future movement to the audience and said: "We have schoolchildren marching in the streets because they don't believe that politicians act fast enough." Amnesty International Secretary-General Kumi Naidoo warned: "Nature does not negotiate." Representatives of the US government did not take part in the discussion. However, former US Secretary of State John Kerry sat in the audience and declared politics as being in the process of committing "consensual suicide of our planet."

== Participants ==
Among the heads of state and government attending the event were German Chancellor Angela Merkel, Ukraine President Petro Poroshenko, Egyptian president Abdel Fattah el-Sisi, President of Afghanistan Ashraf Ghani, President of Romania Klaus Iohannis, as well as Prime Minister of Bangladesh Hasina Wajed, and Emir of Qatar Tamim bin Hamad Al Thani.

The US delegation included US Vice President Mike Pence, Speaker of the United States House of Representatives Nancy Pelosi, the daughter of the US president, Ivanka Trump, and her husband Jared Kushner.

Other guests included Russian Foreign Minister Sergey Lavrov, EU Foreign Affairs Commissioner Federica Mogherini, NATO Secretary General Jens Stoltenberg, IMF Director Christine Lagarde, Iranian Foreign Minister Mohammad Javad Zarif, Iraqi Foreign Minister Mohamed Ali Alhakim, British Minister of Defence Gavin Williamson and his French counterpart Florence Parly, Yang Jiechi, as a member of the CCP Politburo responsible for foreign policy, and the Nobel Peace Prize winners Tawakkol Karman and Beatrice Fihn.

On behalf of the German Federal Government, in addition to Chancellor Merkel and Defence Minister von der Leyen, Foreign Minister Heiko Maas, Vice-Chancellor and Finance Minister Olaf Scholz, Economics Minister Peter Altmaier, Health Minister Jens Spahn and Agriculture Minister Julia Klöckner attended the conference.

French President Emmanuel Macron, as well as Israeli Prime Minister Benjamin Netanyahu cancelled their visits.

== Award ceremonies ==
This year, the annual Ewald von Kleist Preis was awarded to the Greek Prime Minister Alexis Tsipras and Northern Macedonian Prime Minister Zoran Zaev for their agreement over the naming dispute between the two countries. For the first time during the conference, the John McCain Dissertation Award for outstanding research on security-political issues was presented to two political scientists, Abigail Post and Ulrike Franke.

== Side events ==
In addition to the main conference, there were numerous side events, including the Munich Young Leaders Program organized by the MSC and the Körber Foundation, and other events on climate change and security hosted by the United Nations Environment Programme, energy security, cyber security, health security and international threats.

== Evaluation ==
According to conference chairman Wolfgang Ischinger, it was one of the most important conferences of recent years, as it had become clear that the international system was under extreme threat. By far the most important speech, in his opinion, came from Angela Merkel. As a negative tendency, it could be observed that although conflict parties used the conference to present their position, they did not want to discuss with each other what had originally been the strength of the conference.
