= Carmen Barros =

Chilean actress and singer (1925–2023)

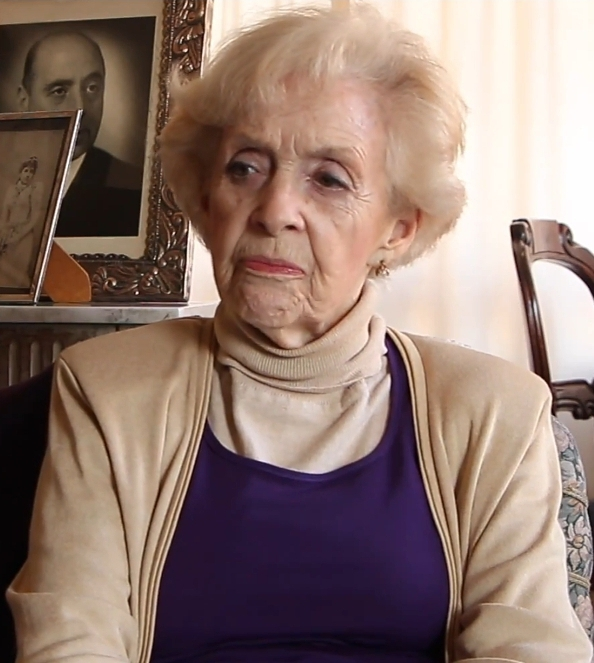
- Barros in 2016
- Born: Carmen Aída Barros Alfonso; 7 January 1925; Santiago, Chile
- Died: 21 December 2023 (aged 98)
- Other name: Marianela
- Occupations: Actress, singer, professor, theater director
- Spouse: Jaime Amunátegui Silva
- Children: Jaime Amunátegui Barros; Loreto Amunátegui Barros
- Father: Tobías Barros
- Awards: APES Award (2010); Caleuche Award (2017)

Carmen Aída Barros Alfonso (7 January 1925 – 21 December 2023) was a Chilean actress and singer of jazz, popular music, and opera. In addition, she was a professor of acting perception, diction, and vocal projection, and a theater and opera director. She was known for being the first to portray the character Carmela in the Isidora Aguirre play La pérgola de las flores in 1960.

== Biography ==
Carmen Barros was the elder of two siblings. Because of her father's military profession, which caused him to be sent on missions in Germany, as well as to different garrisons in the country, Carmen never stayed more than seven months at one school. She lived between Santiago, other cities of the country, Peru, and Europe, and learned to speak German before Spanish.

However, she attended the French Nuns, a women's college where she was the "wild card" of the course for any artistic competition involving dancing or acting.

When she was 14, her father, Tobías Barros, was assigned as Chilean ambassador to Germany, and that change marked her life. It was 1940, and World War II was in full development. A lot of people Barros' age that she met on this trip she never saw again; they joined Hitler's army to colonize Europe and fell out of contact. As a counterpoint, the cultural opportunities of Berlin influenced her future career: concerts, opera, theater; despite the horror of the war, that never changed. She tried to resume her basic education, in a German school, but could not stand being in a co-educational one, so she chose to retire and take private classes at home. However, she never finished her studies.

At age 19, Barros returned to Chile, but everything had changed. Santiago del Campo offered to let her sing on the radio and gave her the pseudonym Marianela. She had begun her career as a singer. She worked at Radio Agricultura, Corporación, and Minería. In 1946, when a company of New York's Metropolitan Opera House came to Chile with the Beethoven opera Fidelio, Barros was invited to participate. It was one of the great successes of the Municipal Theater. She was even invited to go to New York, but did not dare; she had been outside the country for too long.

Her brother was the one who spurred her interest in theater. He was an actor and creator of the Pocket Theater, and invited her to participate in the play Carlos y Ana, which she starred in. She also worked with Luis Alberto Heiremans, combining her talents for singing and the theater. This continued until her father was named ambassador to Italy, and the dream vanished. She went to Italy with her husband and three children to see what happened there. She continued with her "operatic" work, went to live in Vienna, and was invited to take a leading role in the Opera of Brussels, Belgium. However, her father was named chancellor and had to return home. She could never reconcile her dreams with distance. Although she endured another year without seeing her children, finally, and although her prospects were favorable, she returned to Chile in 1957.

Barros had the opportunity to become an international opera star. She entered the Trial Theater of the Catholic University and was invited to participate in Esta Señorita Trini, which was the prelude to La pérgola de las flores. She shared the stage with Silvia Piñeiro, Ana González, and many other actors, and starred as the first Carmela. Also in 1965 she had a musical group, Los Gatos, which was very successful. After the 1973 Chilean coup d'état, she went to Kenya and worked as a UN official for nine years. Then she returned to Chile and began appearing on television. Her first series was Los títeres (1984), which together with her role on El amor está de moda (1995) was her greatest pride.

In 2010, she received the APES Award for her artistic career.

In 2015, she starred alongside Gloria Münchmeyer, Ana Reeves, and Consuelo Holzapfel in the television series Los años dorados, directed by Ricardo Vicuña. This role earned her a nomination at the Caleuche Awards for Best Leading Actress in a TV Series in 2016.

In 2017, she received the Caleuche Award for her career from the Minister of Culture, Ernesto Ottone, and Chileactores. In March of the same year, she was honored as a Distinguished Public Person by the Municipality of Providencia.

== Personal life ==
Her son Jaime Amunátegui Barros married Jacqueline Pinochet Hiriart on 24 January 1984 in Cerro Castillo, and the couple had two children: Sofía and Jaime Augusto Amunátegui Pinochet. In 2016, Barros told CNN Chile that Pinochet Hiriart "believed that I was a communist for being an artist."

Barros' daughter, Loreto Amunátegui Barros, was governor of Chacabuco Province from 2000 to 2006.

Carmen Barros defined herself as a Bacheletista – a supporter of President Michelle Bachelet. She died on 21 December 2023, at the age of 98.

== Filmography ==
=== Film ===
- Bajo un cielo de gloria (1944)
- Música en tu corazón (1946)
- La casa en que vivimos (1970)
- La Fiebre del Loco (2001)
- La chupilca del diablo (2012)
- The Guest (La Visita) (2014) Chile-Argentina
- El huésped (2014)
- Perla (2015)
- Viejos amores (2016)

=== Television ===
Year	Title	Role	Channel
1969	La Señora	Marianela	Canal 13
1984	Los títeres	Tuca Chica Leyton	Canal 13
1985	Matrimonio de papel	Marcela Dellany	Canal 13
1986	Secreto de familia	Señora Ovalle	Canal 13
1989	La intrusa	Mercedes "Memé"	Canal 13
1990	Acércate más	Delfina Rosado	Canal 13
1995	El amor está de moda	Aurora Zañartu	Canal 13
2001	Piel canela	Titania Conejo	Canal 13
2004	Hippie	Leonor Errázuriz	Canal 13
2007	Papi Ricky	Julita Merino	Canal 13
2010	Volver a mí	Conchita	Canal 13
2013	Soltera otra vez 2	Mireya Vásquez	Canal 13
2015	Los años dorados	Carmen Ortiz	UCV
2016	Lo que callamos las mujeres	Mirta	Chilevisión
2016	Preciosas	Adelaida Undurraga	Canal 13
2017	Vidas en Riesgo	Dolores	Chilevisión

== Theatre ==
- Esta señorita Trini – Trinidad
- La pérgola de las flores – Carmela de San Rosendo
- Javiera y su fantasma
- Como en la gran ciudad
- The boy friend
- Les Précieuses ridicules
- Anatole
- Mi Marilyn Monroe (2011) – Marilyn Monroe
- The Obscene Bird of Night (2012)
- El marinero (2015)

== Awards and nominations ==
=== APES Awards ===
Year	Category	Work	Result
2010	Artistic Career		Winner

=== Caleuche Awards ===
Year	Category	Work	Result
2016	Best Leading Actress – Series or Miniseries	Los años dorados	Nominated
2017	Artistic Career		Winner
