= Javier Naranjo Solano =

Chilean lawyer and politician

Javier Naranjo
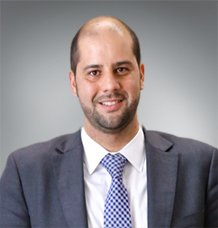

Minister for the Environment
- In office 22 November 2021 – 11 March 2022
- President: Sebastián Piñera
- Preceded by: Carolina Schmidt
- Succeeded by: Maisa Rojas

Undersecretary for the Environment
- In office 11 February 2020 – 22 November 2021
- President: Sebastián Piñera
- Preceded by: Marcelo Fernández Gómez
- Succeeded by: Felipe Riesco

Personal details
- Born: 10 June 1983 (age 43) Santiago, Chile
- Education: Andrés Bello National University (LL.B); Pontifical Catholic University of Chile (LL.M)
- Profession: Lawyer

Javier Naranjo Solano (born 10 June 1983) is a Chilean lawyer and former Minister for the Environment.

From 22 November 2021 to 11 March 2022, he served as Minister of the Environment under the second administration of President Sebastián Piñera.

Previously, from 10 February 2020 to 22 November 2021, he served as Undersecretary of the Environment.

== Family and education ==
He is the son of Eduardo Naranjo León and Roxana Solano.

He graduated as a lawyer from the Andrés Bello National University (UNAB) and later obtained a Master of Laws (LL.M) in Regulatory Law from the Pontifical Catholic University of Chile.

== Political career ==
Between 2011 and 2014, during the first administration of President Sebastián Piñera, he served as legal chief of the Ministry of the Interior and Public Security in the Aysén Region.

From 2014 to 2017, he worked as head of the Department of Litigation and Administrative Appeals at the Ministry of the Environment (MMA). He subsequently served as head of the Legal Division of the Environmental Assessment Service (SEA) from 2018 to 2020.

Between late 2017 and early 2018, he was an associate lawyer at the law firm Jara del Favero (JDF), where he specialized in administrative, environmental, and natural resources law.

On 11 February 2020, he was appointed Undersecretary of the Environment by President Sebastián Piñera, following the resignation of Felipe Riesco Eyzaguirre.

He remained in that position until 22 November 2021, when, following the resignation of Carolina Schmidt as Minister of the Environment, he was appointed by the President as Minister of the Environment.
