= Ministry for the Environment (Chile) =

Government ministry of Chile

- Ministerio de Medio Ambiente
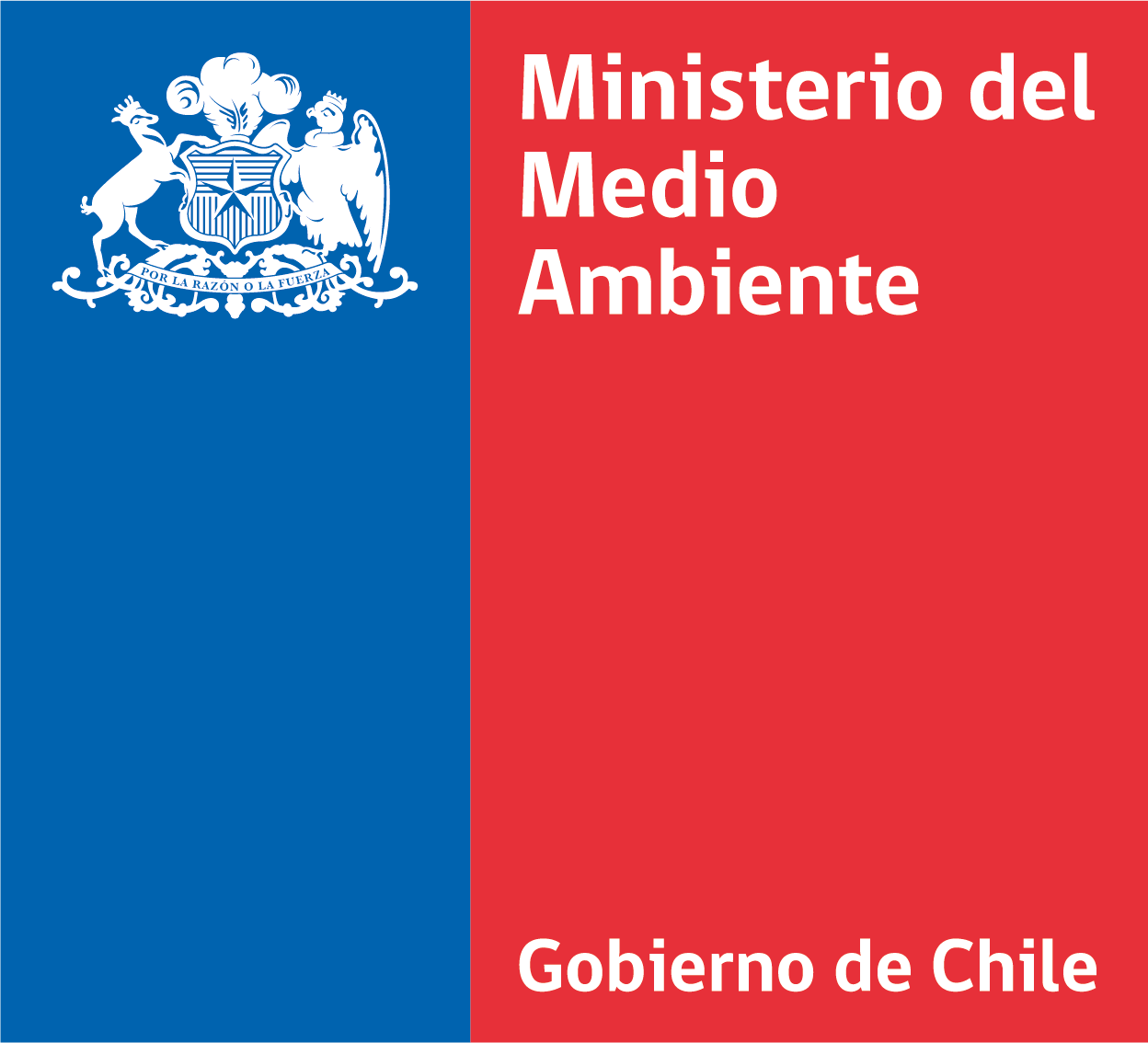

State agency overview
- Formed: 12 January 2010
- Preceding State agency: Comisión Nacional del Medio Ambiente, CONAMA
- Minister responsible: Francisca Toledo
- Deputy Minister responsible: José Ignacio Vial Barros, Undersecretary
- Website: Ministry for the Environment

The Ministry of Environment (Spanish: Ministerio de Medio Ambiente) is a ministry of the State of Chile that is in charge of collaborating with the President of the Republic in the design and application of policies, plans and programs in environmental matters, as well as in the protection and conservation of biological diversity and of renewable and hydric natural resources, promoting sustainable development, the integrity of the environmental policy and its normative regulation.

This ministry was created in January 2010 to replace the National Environment Commission (Comisión Nacional del Medio Ambiente, CONAMA). The new ministry became operational on October 1 of that year.

Francisca Toledo has served as minister since 11 March 2026, while José Ignacio Vial Barros serves as Undersecretary.

== Background ==
From December 1990 to March 1994, the highest environmental authority was the Technical Secretariat of the National Environment Commission of the Ministry of National Assets, which would later become the National Environment Commission. The highest position of that Secretariat was held in all the period by Rafael Asenjo.

In March 1994, it was created the National Environmental Commission (CONAMA) through the Law on General Bases of the Environment (Law No. 19,300), being José Goñi its first CEO.

In 2007, it was created the position of President of the National Environmental Commission, granting him the rank of Minister of State. Thus, Ana Lya Uriarte was the first Minister President of that Commission.

== List of representatives ==
Minister	Party	Term start	Term end	President
María Ignacia Benítez	UDI	1 October 2010	14 March 2014	Sebastián Piñera
Pablo Badenier	DC	11 March 2014	20 March 2017	Michelle Bachelet
Marcelo Mena	Independent	20 March 2017	11 March 2018	Michelle Bachelet
Marcela Cubillos	UDI	11 March 2018	9 August 2018	Sebastián Piñera
Carolina Schmidt	Independent	9 August 2018	22 November 2021	Sebastián Piñera
Javier Naranjo Solano	Independent	22 November 2021	11 March 2022	Sebastián Piñera
Maisa Rojas Corradi	Independent	11 March 2022	11 March 2026	Gabriel Boric
Francisca Toledo	Ind.	11 March 2026	Incumbent	José Antonio Kast
