= Felipe Bulnes =

Chilean politician (born 1969)

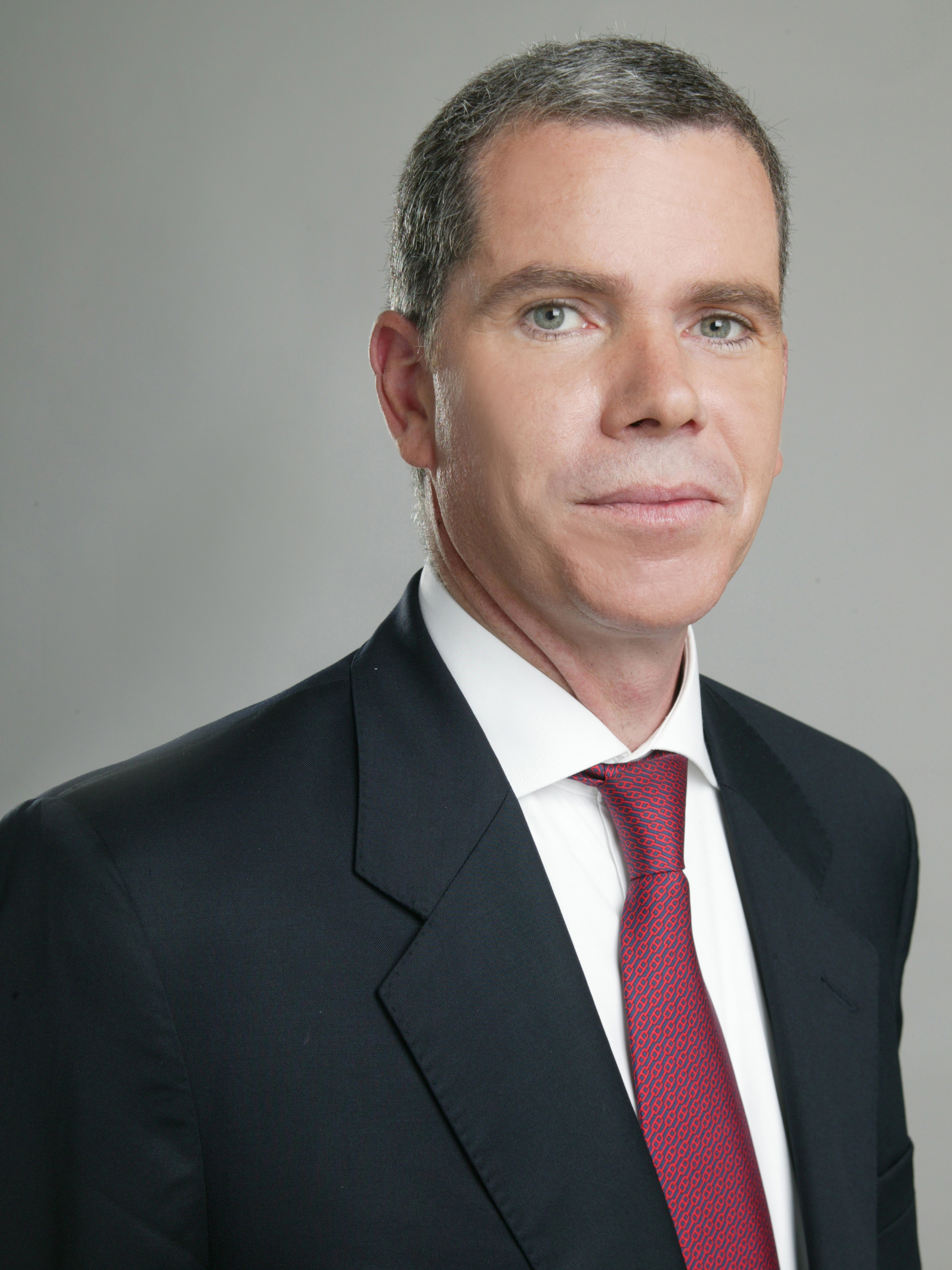

Ambassador of Chile to the United States
- In office March 2012 – April 2014
- President: Sebastián Pinera; Michelle Bachelet
- Preceded by: Arturo Fermandois
- Succeeded by: Juan Gabriel Valdés

Minister of Education
- In office 18 July 2011 – 29 December 2011
- President: Sebastián Pinera
- Preceded by: Joaquín Lavín
- Succeeded by: Harald Beyer

Minister of Justice
- In office 11 March 2010 – 18 July 2011
- President: Sebastián Pinera
- Preceded by: Carlos Maldonado
- Succeeded by: Teodoro Ribera

Personal details
- Born: 27 May 1969 (age 57) Santiago, Chile
- Party: Renovación Nacional (RN)
- Spouses: Mónica Pellegrini; Carolina De Moras (2022–present)
- Children: One
- Parent(s): María Teresa Serrano; Francisco Bulnes Ripamonti
- Relatives: Manuel Bulnes; Francisco Bulnes
- Education: Pontifical Catholic University of Chile (LL.B); Harvard University (Ph.D)
- Occupation: Politician
- Profession: Lawyer

Felipe Bulnes Serrano (born May 27, 1969) is a Chilean lawyer and member of the party National Renewal. He was first Minister of Justice and then he assumed office as Minister of Education following a cabinet shuffle on July 18 amidst the ongoing 2011 Chilean student protests but renounced about six months later on December 29 explaining that he left because a "cycle has finished" and not because he would be fired.

In 2012, Bulnes was appointed by the government of Sebastián Piñera as ambassador to the United States, handing his credentials to President Barack Obama on May 1, 2012. During his tenure, Chile was admitted to the Visa Waiver Program.

He was afterwards Chile's representative at the La Haya International Court, after being renewed in that post by the government of President Bachelet. On November 23, 2015 he resigned this position and was replaced by former Minister José Miguel Insulza.

He graduated from Pontifical Catholic University of Chile and Harvard Law School.

== Family and education ==
He is the son of lawyer Francisco Bulnes Ripamonti (who died when he was fourteen years old) and journalist María Teresa Serrano. His paternal grandfather was lawyer and Conservative senator Francisco Bulnes Sanfuentes. Through this lineage, he is a direct descendant of Mateo de Toro y Zambrano and of Chilean presidents Francisco Antonio Pinto, Manuel Bulnes, Aníbal Pinto, and Juan Luis Sanfuentes.

He studied at Tabancura School in Santiago and, from 1987 onward, at the Pontifical Catholic University of Chile, where he graduated as a lawyer with highest distinction.

He was previously married to Mónica Pellegrini Vial, with whom he has one son, Mariano. Since 2018, he has been in a relationship with journalist Carolina de Moras. The couple married in November 2022.

== Professional career ==
His first legal position was in 1989 as a court clerk while in his third year of law school at the Central Bank of Chile. He later worked at the law firm Cariola y Compañía and, in 1993, joined the firm Ortúzar y Águila at the invitation of Álvaro Ortúzar.

In 1995, he took a one-year professional hiatus to study in Boston, United States, earning a Master of Laws (LL.M.) degree from Harvard University. Upon returning to Chile, he rejoined the firm, becoming a partner in 1997 (the firm later became Ortúzar, Águila y Bulnes).

Among the most notable cases of his career are the lawsuit filed by the Bank of Chile against the Central Bank of Chile over subordinated debt, the entry and consolidation of Endesa in Chile, litigation between Coca-Cola and Cadbury Schweppes, and the merger of Santander and Santiago Bank.

He has served as professor of law and economics and civil law at the Pontifical Catholic University of Chile and as professor of law and economics at the Adolfo Ibáñez University.

He was a board member of the Chilean Bar Association between 2001 and 2005 and, in 2006, founded the law firm Bulnes, Pellegrini & Urrutia.

== Political career ==
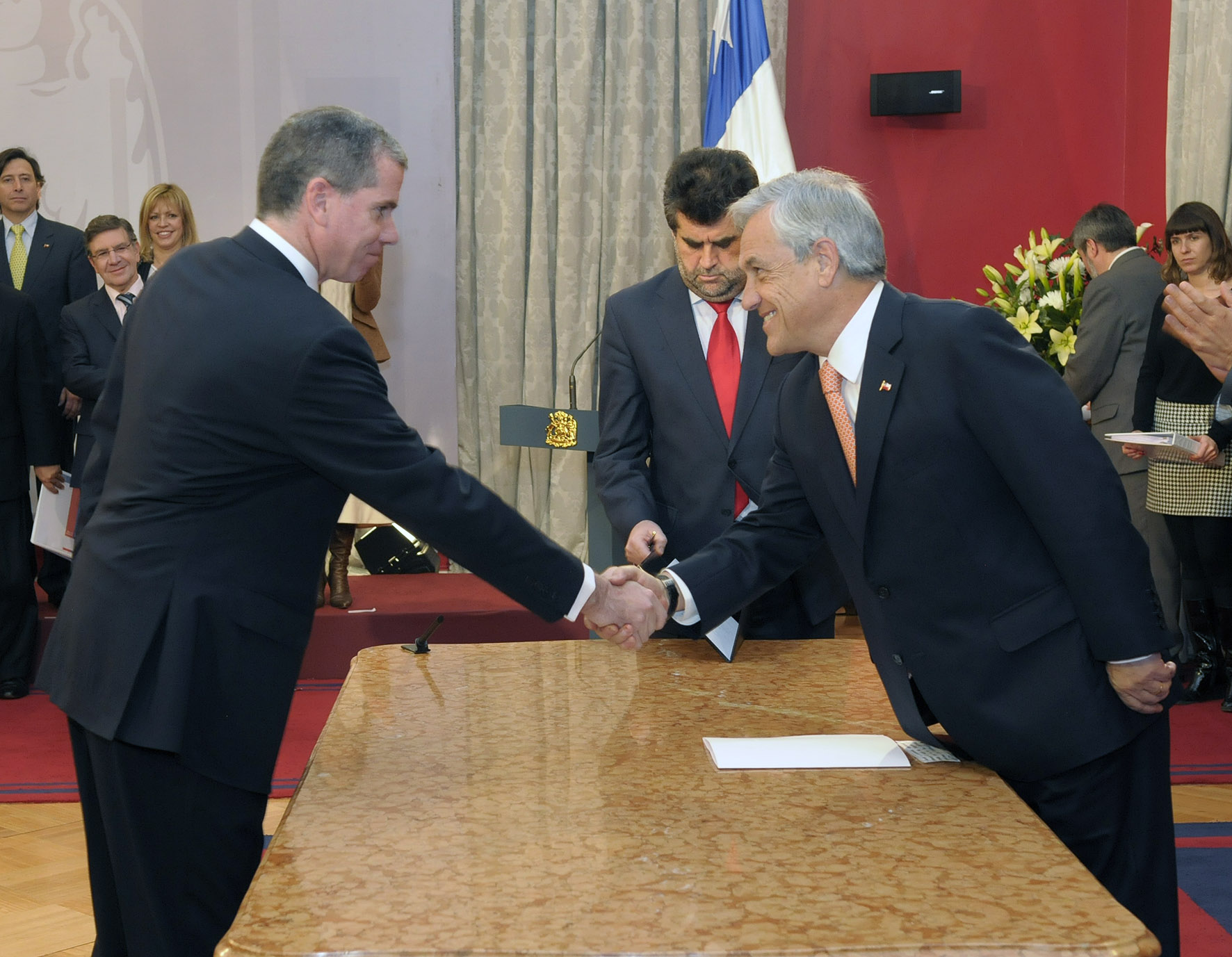
Felipe Bulnes taking the oath of office as Minister of Education before President Sebastián Piñera.

He was a member of his party’s Political Commission, coordinator of the Civil Justice Commission, and a member of the Public Security Commission of the so-called Tantauco group.

In February 2010, President-elect Sebastián Piñera nominated him as Minister of Justice, a position he assumed on 11 March 2010. During his first year in office, he faced the aftermath of the San Miguel prison fire, which resulted in more than 80 inmate deaths and became the deadliest prison tragedy in Chilean history.

On 18 July 2011, he left the Ministry of Justice to assume office as Minister of Education. He took office amid the 2011–2013 Chilean student protests, which demanded reforms to the education system. The political strain associated with the crisis ultimately led to his resignation on 29 December 2011, after which he was succeeded by Harald Beyer.

On 6 May 2013, he was appointed Chile’s agent before the International Court of Justice in response to Bolivia’s claim seeking sovereign access to the Pacific Ocean.

In March 2014, President Michelle Bachelet confirmed him in that role prior to the start of her second administration. On 23 November 2015, he resigned as Chile’s agent before The Hague and was replaced by José Miguel Insulza.

He ceased serving as ambassador to the US in April 2014 and was succeeded by Juan Gabriel Valdés.
