= Enrique Larre =

Chilean politician (1933–2024)

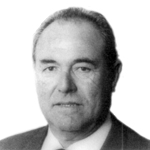
- Larre, c. 1990

Member of the Senate of Chile
- In office 11 March 1990 – 11 March 1998
- Preceded by: District created
- Succeeded by: Marco Cariola
- Constituency: Los Lagos Region

Intendant of Los Lagos Region
- In office 12 December 1988 – 10 March 1989
- President: Augusto Pinochet
- Preceded by: Jorge Iturriaga Moreira
- Succeeded by: Julio Maiers

Mayor of La Unión
- In office 1974 – 12 December 1988
- Appointed by: Augusto Pinochet
- In office 1963–1973

Member of the Chamber of Deputies
- In office 15 May 1973 – 21 September 1973
- Succeeded by: Dissolution of the Office (1973 coup d'etat)

Personal details
- Born: 22 February 1933 Angol, Chile
- Died: 16 October 2024 (aged 91)
- Party: National Party (1966–1973); National Renewal (since 1990)
- Spouse: Elena Buschmann
- Children: 2
- Parent(s): Enrique Larre; Emma Asenjo
- Education: University of Chile
- Occupation: Politician
- Profession: Engineer

Enrique Larre Asenjo (22 February 1933 – 16 October 2024) was a Chilean parliamentarian, who also served as a mayor of La Unión in southern Chile. Larre died on 16 October 2024, at the age of 91.

== Biography ==
He was born in La Unión on 22 February 1933. He was the son of Enrique Larre Duhalde and Emma Graciela Asenjo Garín. He married Elena Buschmann Aubel, with whom he had two children. He died in La Unión on 16 October 2024.

=== Professional career ===
He completed his primary education at the German School of La Unión and his secondary education at the Carlos Andwanter German Institute and the Liceo de Hombres of Valdivia. After completing his schooling, he moved to Santiago, where he obtained the degree of Agricultural Engineer from the University of Chile.

In 1982, he received a Special Award from the Chilean Association of Agricultural Engineers. In 2000, he founded the Northern Los Lagos Region Livestock Breeders Trade Association, serving as its president until December 2002.

He served as a full member of the board of directors of the Austral University of Chile between 2007 and 2011, after which he chose to retire from public life.

He devoted himself to agricultural activities as a silvo-agricultural entrepreneur, specializing in dairy production, cattle raising, and the cultivation of wheat, sugar beet, and maize.

== Political career ==
In 1962, he was appointed acting governor of La Unión, and from the following year until 1973, he served as mayor of the same city.

In 1974, he was appointed mayor of La Unión, a position he held until 1988.

He served as Chile’s official delegate to the Ibero-American Congress of Municipalities, held in Santiago and Montevideo.

Between 1982 and 1984, he was a member of the Advisory Committee to the Minister of the Interior, Sergio Onofre Jarpa.

In 1988, he was appointed Intendant of the Los Lagos Region.

In 1989, after being elected Senator as an independent candidate within the Democracy and Progress pact, he joined Renovación Nacional on 13 March 1990.
