= Andrés Allamand =

Chilean politician

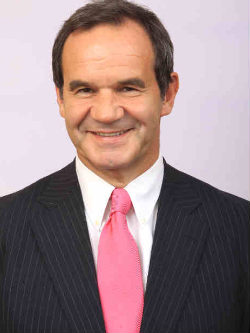

Minister of Foreign Affairs
- In office 28 July 2020 – 6 February 2022
- President: Sebastián Piñera
- Preceded by: Teodoro Ribera
- Succeeded by: Carolina Valdivia

Minister of National Defense
- In office 16 January 2011 – 5 November 2012
- President: Sebastián Piñera
- Preceded by: Jaime Ravinet
- Succeeded by: Rodrigo Hinzpeter

Member of the Senate of Chile
- In office 11 March 2014 – 28 August 2020
- Preceded by: Jovino Novoa
- Succeeded by: Marcela Sabat
- Constituency: Santiago Metropolitan Region
- In office 11 March 2006 – 16 January 2011
- Preceded by: Marco Cariola
- Succeeded by: Carlos Larraín
- Constituency: Los Rios Region

Personal details
- Born: 7 February 1956 (age 70) Santiago, Chile
- Party: National Party (1970−1973); National Union Movement (1983−1987); Renovación Nacional (1987−present)
- Spouse(s): Bárbara Lyon; Marcela Cubillos (2012−present)
- Children: Four (Among them, Ignacia)
- Parent(s): Miguel Allamand; Margarita Zavala
- Education: University of Chile (LL.B)
- Occupation: Politician
- Profession: Lawyer

Andrés Allamand Zavala (born February 7, 1956), a Chilean politician, is the founder and one of the past leaders of Renovación Nacional. He is of French, and Basque descent.

In early 2011, Allamand was named Minister of Defense by president Sebastián Piñera. He was sworn in on January 16th and left office on November 5, 2012.

In 2021, he again was appointed minister by Piñera, now as Minister of Foreign Affairs following a Cabinet reshuffle on July 28th, resigning the Senate seat he had held since 2014. Allamand is a member of the Inter-American Dialogue.

== Early life and family ==
He was born on 7 February 1956 in Santiago, Chile. He is the son of Andrés Allamand Madaune and María Zavala.

He is married to Marcela Cubillos and is the father of four children: Olivia, Ignacia, Raimundo, and Juan Andrés.

== Professional career ==
He completed his secondary education at Saint George’s College and at the Liceo José Victorino Lastarria, graduating in 1973. He later entered the Faculty of Law at the University of Chile, where he obtained a degree in Legal and Social Sciences. His undergraduate thesis was titled El sistema de Tiempo Propio: un caso de aplicación práctica. He qualified as a lawyer on 31 January 1983.

In his professional career, he worked as a legal officer at Banco de Chile and practiced law independently at the firm Allamand, Barros, Mayol, Varela y Wagner Abogados Asociados. Between 1976 and 1983, he was a member of the Chilean national rugby team.

From 1996 to 1998, he served as president of the Instituto Libertad, a political think tank linked to his party Renovación Nacional (RN). From 1998 to 2000, he worked as a consultant for the Inter-American Development Bank (IDB) in Washington, D.C., United States, and served as a visiting professor at Georgetown University.

In 2001, he joined Adolfo Ibáñez University. Between 2002 and 2007, he served as Director of Development and was the founding Dean of the School of Government.

He has published books and articles on contemporary politics and related subjects and has also written novels. He was a columnist for Diario Austral de Valdivia and Diario de Osorno.

== Political career ==
He began his political activity in 1972 as a candidate for the Federation of Secondary Students of Santiago (FESES), representing the youth wing of the National Party. In 1973, he served as president of the party’s student youth organization.

In 1983, he was one of the founders of the National Union Movement, serving as its secretary general until 1984 and as its president from 1984 to 1986. In that role, he signed the 1985 National Accord for the Full Transition to Democracy.

In 1987, he participated in the founding of RN, following a call for unity among center-right political forces. Within the party, he served as vice president until 1988 and as secretary general from 1988 to 1990. He was subsequently elected party president for three consecutive terms: 1990–1992, 1992–1994, and 1994–1996.

In parallel with his political leadership, he was invited to international forums and conferences and attended meetings of the Democratic and Republican parties in the US, as well as sessions of the European Parliament in Brussels. He also participated in meetings of the Pacific Democratic Union and the Foreign Affairs Committee of the International Democracy Union.

In 1997, he ran for a seat in the Senate representing the 8th Electoral Circumscription (Santiago Oriente), but was not elected.

In 2009, he joined the Strategic Committee of Sebastián Piñera’s presidential campaign. On 16 January 2011, President Piñera appointed him Minister of National Defense, replacing Jaime Ravinet. He served in that position until 5 November 2012.

He was a pre-candidate for the presidency of Chile on behalf of RN during the 2013 primary elections and later supported Pablo Longueira as the candidate of the Alliance for Chile.

On 28 July 2020, he was appointed Minister of Foreign Affairs during the second government of Sebastián Piñera, serving until 6 February 2022.

On 26 November 2021, he was elected Secretary-General of the Ibero-American General Secretariat during the meeting of Ibero-American Ministers of Foreign Affairs held in Santo Domingo, Dominican Republic. He assumed office on 8 February 2022 after resigning as Minister of Foreign Affairs.
