= Carolina Schmidt =

Chilean politician and businesswoman

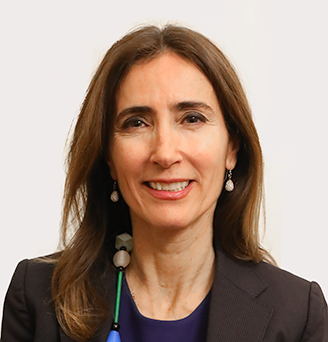

Minister for the Environment
- In office 9 August 2018 – 22 November 2021
- President: Sebastián Piñera
- Preceded by: Marcela Cubillos
- Succeeded by: Javier Naranjo Solano

Minister of Education of Chile
- In office 22 April 2013 – 11 March 2014
- President: Sebastián Piñera
- Preceded by: Harald Beyer
- Succeeded by: Nicolás Eyzaguirre

Personal details
- Born: September 9, 1967 (age 59) Santiago
- Party: Independent
- Education: Pontifical Catholic University of Chile

María Carolina Schmidt Zaldívar (born 9 September 1967) is a Chilean politician and businesswoman who was the Minister of the Environment between August 2018 and November 2021, in the second government of Sebastián Piñera. She also served as the Minister of Education from April 2013 to March 2014.

== Education and early career ==
She graduated from the Pontifical Catholic University of Chile with a degree in commercial engineering, and also studied a short non-degree specialization course in Marketing at New York University. After finishing her studies, Schmidt worked as a saleswomen in the United Kingdom under entrepreneur Alfonso Swett. After ten years, she became general manager of the Chilean branch of Nine West Holdings, focusing on expanding the brand to Latin American countries.

== Political career ==
In 2000, Schmidt was named general manager of the magazine Capital, serving in that role for eight years, and was later appointed by President Michelle Bachelet to the President’s Advisory Council, where Schmidt focused on children and women's work, specifically the "Chile Grows With You" program. In March 2010, President Sebastián Piñera appointed her Minister-Director of the National Women's Service. Her primary accomplishment during her time as Minister-Director was extending parental leave from three to six months.

In April 2013, Minister of Education Harald Beyer was impeached for "having failed to investigate complaints against universities allegedly engaged in profit-making"; Schmidt was highly regarded in Piñera's cabinet, and as a result she was appointed to the position, serving until Piñera's term ended on 11 March 2014. In August 2017, Schmidt was named general manager of media at Copesa.

Representing the original host country, Schmidt served as President of the 2019 United Nations Climate Change Conference (COP25) held in Madrid, Spain.
