= Carolina Valdivia =

Chilean politician (1978–2024)

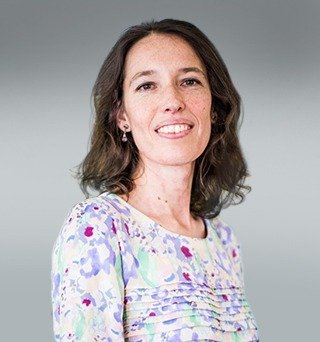
- Official portrait, 2022

Minister of Foreign Affairs
- In office 6 February 2022 – 11 March 2022
- President: Sebastián Piñera
- Preceded by: Andrés Allamand
- Succeeded by: Antonia Urrejola

Undersecretary of Foreign Affairs
- In office 18 August 2018 – 6 February 2022
- Preceded by: Alfonso Silva Navarro
- Succeeded by: Gloria Navarrete Pinto

Personal details
- Born: 7 March 1978 Santiago, Chile
- Died: 11 November 2024 (aged 46)
- Party: Independent
- Children: 1
- Parent(s): Ernesto Valdivia Angermeyer; María Pilar Torres
- Education: Pontifical Catholic University of Chile (LL.B); Complutense University of Madrid (LL.M)
- Occupation: Politician
- Profession: Lawyer

Carolina Valdivia Torres (7 March 1978 – 11 November 2024) was a Chilean lawyer who served as caretaker Minister of Foreign Affairs following Andrés Allamand's resignation.

== Education ==
Valdivia held a law degree from the Pontifical Catholic University of Chile, a master’s degree in Law and Economics from the Instituto Ortega y Gasset (Complutense University of Madrid), and was a graduate of the Diplomatic Academy of Chile.

== Career ==
Valdivia served as Director General of Legal Affairs at the Ministry of Foreign Affairs and coordinated the Chilean delegation before the International Court of Justice in The Hague, including the case concerning the obligation to negotiate access to the Pacific Ocean brought by Bolivia. She was later appointed as Chile’s co-agent before the Court in the case concerning the status and use of the Silala River, following the dispute with Bolivia over the origin and shared use of its waters.

Valdivia served as Undersecretary of Foreign Affairs during the second term of Sebastián Piñera's presidency. Following the resignation of Andrés Allamand, she also served as Acting Minister of Foreign Affairs.

In addition to her diplomatic career, she worked as a researcher at the Centro de Estudios Públicos and as a columnist for La Tercera.

== Death ==
Valdivia died from pancreatic cancer on 11 November 2024, at the age of 46.
