= Maisa Rojas =

Chilean politician

Minister for the Environment
- In office 11 March 2022 – 11 March 2026
- President: Gabriel Boric
- Preceded by: Javier Naranjo Solano
- Succeeded by: Francisca Toledo

Personal details
- Born: 10 August 1972 (age 54) Rengo, Chile
- Party: Independent
- Education: University of Chile (BA, 1991−1995); Oxford University (Ph.D., 1996−2000)
- Occupation: Politician
- Profession: Physicist

María Heloísa Juana Rojas Corradi (born 10 August 1972), known as Maisa Rojas is a Chilean politician, physicist, and climatologist who has been serving as Minister for the Environment since 2022.

== Early life and education ==
Rojas received her undergraduate degree in physics from the University of Chile and her Ph.D. in atmospheric physics from Lincoln College, Oxford.

== Career ==
=== Career in academia ===
Rojas was a postdoctoral fellow at the International Research Institute for Climate and Society at Columbia University in 2001. She then returned to the Universidad de Chile as a postdoctoral fellow, researcher, and later as a professor of geophysics.

During that time, Rojas became an internationally leading climate change scientist. She was the lead author of the Paleoclimate chapter for the UN Intergovernmental Panel on Climate Change's (IPCC) fifth report (AR5) and was also a coordinating lead author for the IPCC report (AR6). She has served on various presidential councils and committees on climate change.

=== Career in government ===
In 2022, Chilean President Gabriel Boric named Rojas Minister for the Environment in his cabinet.

Rojas, along with Jennifer Morgan, led the working group at the 2022 United Nations Climate Change Conference that developed an agreement on loss and damage finance.

In a mid-2023 interview, following one year as environment minister, Rojas stated that a major reason for entering politics was to prevent noted climate denier José Antonio Kast from becoming president. Rojas also does not believe that present government institutions are equipped to deal with the scale of the climate emergency we face. Nonetheless, Rojas believes that a just transition to net-zero is a necessity.
