= Jennifer Morgan (activist) =

American German environmental activist

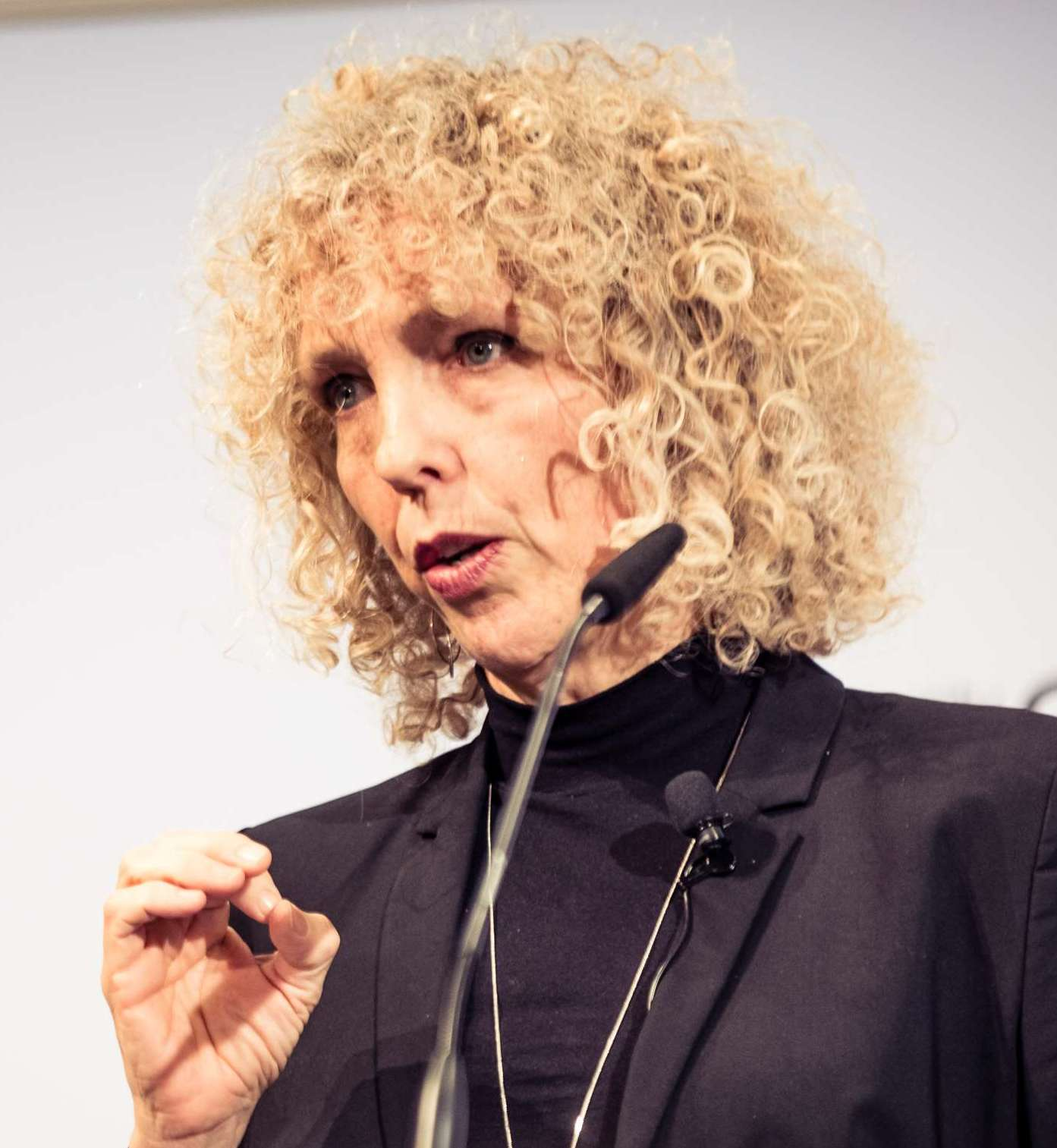
- Morgan in 2020

Special representative for International climate policy, German Federal Foreign Office
- In office 2022–2025
- Appointed by: Annalena Baerbock
- Chancellor: Olaf Scholz
- Preceded by: Office established
- Succeeded by: Office discontinued

Personal details
- Born: Jennifer Morgan; April 21, 1966 (age 60) Ridgewood, New Jersey, U.S.
- Education: Indiana University Bloomington
- Occupation: Environmental activist

Jennifer Morgan (born April 21, 1966) is an American German environmental activist specializing in climate change policy.

From 2022 to 2025 she served as special representative for international climate policy of the Federal Foreign Office in Germany under minister Annalena Baerbock.

From 2016 to 2022 Morgan led the environmental protection organization Greenpeace International together with Bunny McDiarmid.

== Early life and education ==
Morgan was born to a bank clerk and a nurse in Ridgewood, New Jersey. After school she studied political science and German from 1988 at Indiana University Bloomington. She graduated with a Bachelor of Arts degree. She then transferred to the School of International Service at American University in Washington, D.C. and studied International Relations there. She received a Master of Arts.

== Career ==
=== Early beginnings ===
From 1994 to 1996 Morgan served as coordinator for the US section of the Climate Action Network. She then directed WWF's Global Climate Change Program from 1998 to 2006. She then worked as Global Climate Change Director for the think tank E3G (Third Generation Environmentalism) from 2006 to 2009. From 2009 to 2016, she worked as Global Director of the Climate Program at the World Resources Institute.

=== Greenpeace, 2016–2022 ===
From April 2016 Morgan served as executive director of Greenpeace International, together with Bunny McDiarmid.

In addition to these full-time tasks, Morgan worked during the German EU Council Presidency in 2007 in the advisory board of the Federal Government under the direction of the climate researcher Hans Joachim Schellnhuber and supported the Breaking the Climate Deadlock initiative of the former British Prime Minister Tony Blair since 2008. She also worked as a review editor on a chapter of the IPCC's Fifth Assessment Report and was a member of the German government's Council for Sustainable Development (Rat für Nachhaltige Entwicklung). From 2010 to 2017 she was a member of the Scientific Advisory Board of the Potsdam Institute for Climate Impact Research and is an honorary member of Germanwatch.

During that time, Morgan was a regular participant at United Nations Climate Change conferences.

=== Germany climate envoy, 2022–2025 ===
On February 8, 2022, it was announced that Morgan was to be appointed to the Federal Republic of Germany's Federal Foreign Office as a special representative for international climate policy. To do this, however, she had to acquire German citizenship, which she did on February 28, 2022. Her superior, Minister for Foreign Affairs Annalena Baerbock, said of her appointment in February 2022 that "as the helmsman, Jennifer Morgan will steer our climate foreign policy, expand partnerships with other countries around the world and conduct dialogue with civil society worldwide."

Morgan, along with Maisa Rojas, led the working group at the 2022 United Nations Climate Change Conference that came up with an agreement on loss and damage finance.

She left this position with the end of the governing "traffic-light coalition" in Germany.

== Bibliography ==
=== Selected articles ===
- Jennifer L. Morgan, Claudio Maretti, Giulio Volpi. Tropical deforestation in the context of the post-2012 Climate Change Regime. pp. 101–110 In: Paulo Moutinho & Stephan Schwartzman (Hrsg.): Tropical Deforestation and Climate Change. Belém: IPAM/Washington DC, Environmental Defense, 2005. ISBN 858782712X https://cmapspublic3.ihmc.us/rid=1H42JRS7V-275MYTJ-F3N/4930_TropicalDeforestation_and_ClimateChange.pdf#page=101
- Jennifer Morgan. Ensuring a secure climate and energy future: Views from Civil Society. London: Chatham House (Royal Institute of International Affairs), September 2006. https://e3g.org/wp-content/uploads/Gleneagles_Views_from_Civil_Society_Sept06.pdf
- Jennifer L. Morgan, Rebecca Bertram. Changing Business and Political Climates in the US and Europe: Where is Japan? London: Third Generation Environmentalism Ltd., 2007.
- Stefan Rahmstorf, Jennifer Morgan, Anders Levermann, and Karsten Sach. Scientific understanding of climate change and consequences for a global deal. In: Hans Joachim Schellnhuber et al. (eds.): Global Sustainability: A Nobel Cause. Cambridge University Press, 2010. (pp. 67–80)
- Lutz Weischer, Jennifer Morgan, Milap Patel. Climate Clubs: Can Small Groups of Countries make a Big Difference in Addressing Climate Change? In: Review of European Community & International Environmental Law (RECIEL), Vol. 21, No. 3 (November 2012), pp. 177–192.
- Jennifer Morgan, Kevin Kennedy. First Take: Looking at President Obama’s Climate Action Plan. Washington, D.C.: World Resources Institute. June 25, 2013.
- Jennifer Margan. Volle Wende voraus. In: The European. June 2, 2013.
- Jennifer Morgan, Lutz Weischer. The World Needs More Energiewende. Washington, D.C.: World Resources Institute, July 30, 2013.
- Jennifer Morgan, David Waskow. A new look at climate equity in the UNFCCC. In: Climate Policy, Vol. 14, No. 1 (October 2013), pp. 17–22.
- Jennifer Morgan. 6 Functions for the International Climate Agreement. Washington, D.C.: World Resources Institute, March 17, 2014
- Michael I. Westphal, Pascal Canfin, Athena Ballesteros and Jennifer Morgan. Getting to $100 Billion: Climate Finance Scenarios and Projections to 2020. In: Working Paper. Washington, DC: World Resources Institute, May 2015
- Jennifer Morgan, Eliza Northrop. Will the Paris Agreement accelerate the pace of change? In: WIREs, Vol. 8, No. 5 (September/October 2017),
