= Eliodoro Domínguez =

Chilean politician

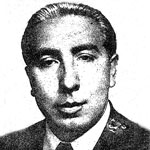

Eliodoro Domínguez (11 September 1898 – 12 April 1992) was a Chilean politician. A member of the Radical Party, he served in the Senate of Chile, and as minister of public education of Chile.
