= Gerardo Varela =

Chilean lawyer and politician

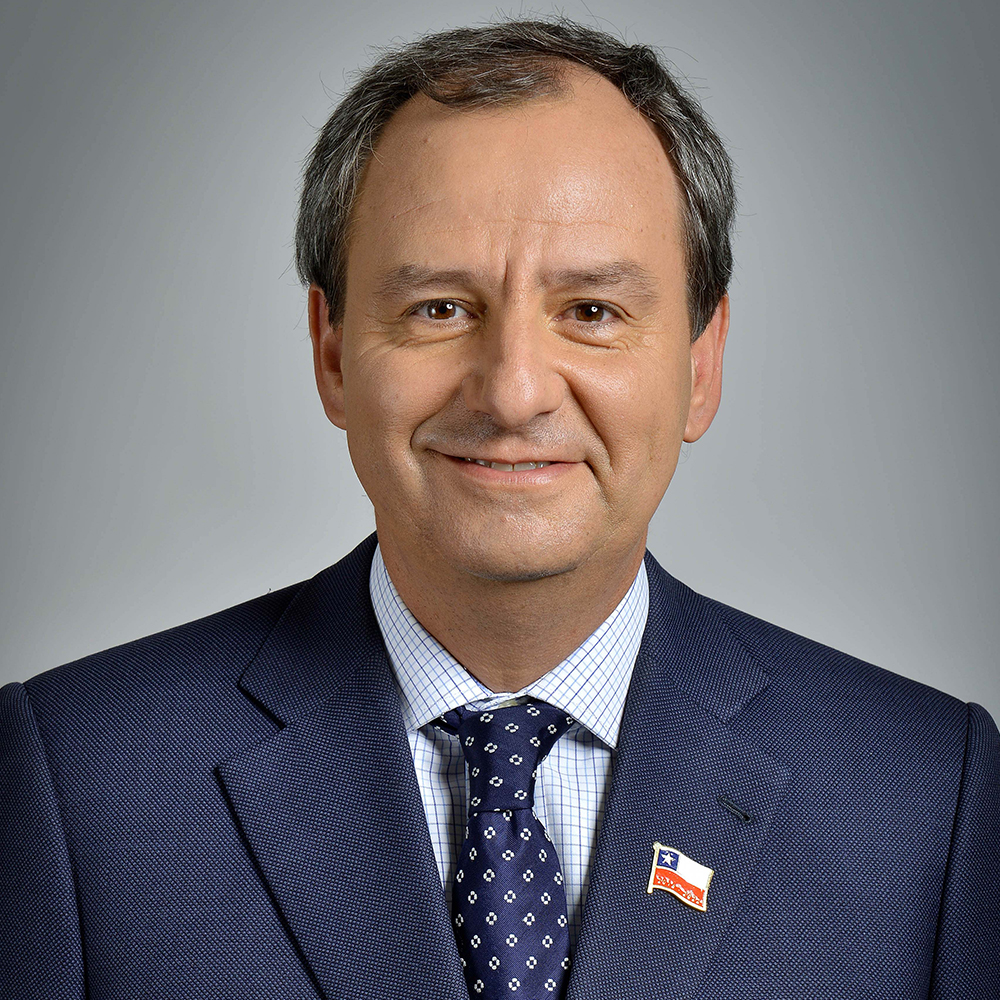
- Official portrait (2018)

Minister of Education
- In office 11 March 2018 – 9 August 2018
- President: Sebastián Piñera
- Preceded by: Adriana Delpiano
- Succeeded by: Marcela Cubillos

Personal details
- Born: 15 June 1963 (age 63) Santiago, Chile
- Spouse: Elena Barros
- Children: Four
- Parent: Esperanza Alfonso (mother)
- Relatives: Pedro Enrique Alfonso (grandfather)
- Education: University of Chile (LL.B)
- Occupation: Politician
- Profession: Lawyer

Gerardo Victorino Varela Alfonso (born 15 June 1963) is a Chilean politician and lawyer who served as minister of State in his country.

On his mother's side, Esperanza Alfonso, he is the grandson of Pedro Enrique Alfonso, who served as Minister of State and was a presidential candidate of the Radical Party.

He is panelist at El Líbero alongside Pepe Auth.

== Biography ==
Varela completed his primary and secondary education at Saint George's College in Santiago and later enrolled in the law program at the University of Chile. He qualified as a lawyer in 1990 and has since been part of the law firm Cariola, Diez, Pérez-Cotapos & Cía., becoming a partner in 1996.

He is married to Elena Barros and is the father of four children: Elena, Gerardo, Lucas and Sara.

== Public life ==
He has served as director of the Fundación para el Progreso, Fundación Emplea of the Hogar de Cristo, EducaUC, and the Observatorio Judicial. In 2010, he assumed the presidency of Soprole.

He was appointed by President Sebastián Piñera as Minister of Education during his second administration, assuming office on 11 March 2018.

On 9 August 2018, it was reported that he would be removed from office, which occurred later that day, being succeeded by Marcela Cubillos.

This occurred days after the president stated, “We are not going to carry out a cabinet reshuffle over a word more or less,” in reference to controversies surrounding Varela’s statements.

In 2019, a criminal complaint was filed against five directors of Prolesur, including Varela, alleging the unlawful cancellation of a debt owed by its sister company Soprole.

The complaint was later withdrawn after authorities determined that no criminal offense had occurred. The directors were fully and definitively acquitted on 2 December 2019.
