= Raúl Figueroa =

Chilean lawyer and politician (born 1975)

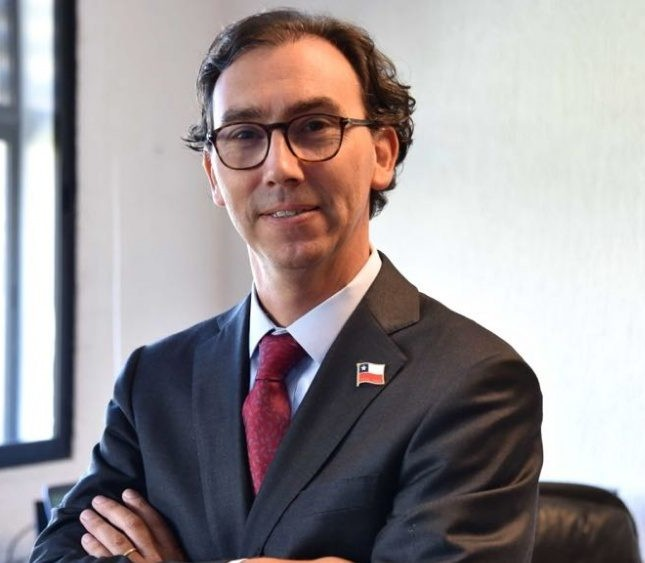
- Raúl Figueroa in 2021.

Minister of Education
- In office 28 February 2020 – 22 March 2022
- President: Sebastián Piñera
- Preceded by: Marcela Cubillos
- Succeeded by: Marco Antonio Ávila

Undersecretary of Education
- In office 11 March 2018 – 28 October 2019
- Preceded by: Valentina Quiroga
- Succeeded by: Jorge Poblete Aedo

Personal details
- Born: 21 March 1975 (age 51) Santiago, Chile
- Spouse: Paulina Campos
- Children: Five
- Parent(s): Luis Figueroa del Río; María Eugenia Salas
- Education: Pontifical Catholic University of Chile (LL.B); Universidad de Los Andes (LL.M)
- Occupation: Politician
- Profession: Lawyer

Raúl Eugenio Figueroa Salas (born 21 March 1975) is a Chilean lawyer and politician. Between February 2020 and March 2022, he served as Minister of Education under the second administration of President Sebastián Piñera.

From March 2018 to February 2020, he served as Undersecretary of Education in the same government.

== Biography ==
=== Family ===
He is the son of María Eugenia Salas Richaud and Luis Simón Figueroa del Río, a politician who served as undersecretary of state under Augusto Pinochet in the ministries of the Interior, National Assets, and Agriculture, as well as ambassador and minister.

In 2000 he married fellow lawyer Paulina Campos, who had been his classmate at the Pontificia Universidad Católica (PUC) and his first girlfriend. They have five children.

=== Professional career ===
He studied at Colegio Tabancura, a school associated with the religious congregation of Opus Dei. According to those close to him, while Figueroa holds the Catholic movement in esteem, he does not maintain a close relationship with it. During his school years he briefly represented his institution in interscholastic athletics competitions.

He later studied law at the Pontificia Universidad Católica (PUC) and obtained a master's degree in corporate law from the University of the Andes.

He was admitted to the bar in 1999 and worked alongside his father as a partner at the law firm "Figueroa y Asociados," where he focused primarily on civil, commercial, and water law matters.

He has served as a professor at the Pontificia Universidad Católica de Chile Faculty of Law and at the Andrés Bello University. At the latter, he also served as academic secretary and director of postgraduate studies at the law faculty. After completing his term as minister of state in March 2022, he returned to teaching at Andrés Bello University.

== Political career ==
He worked in the Ministry of Education during the entire first government of Sebastián Piñera (2010-2014), first as head of the Legal Division and then as head of advisers to the ministry. During Sebastián Piñera's campaign (2017), he was coordinator of the educational program.

In March 2018, he became Undersecretary of Education. On February 28, 2020, he was appointed as Minister of Education of the second government of Sebastián Piñera.
