= Marcelo Mena =

Chilean politician

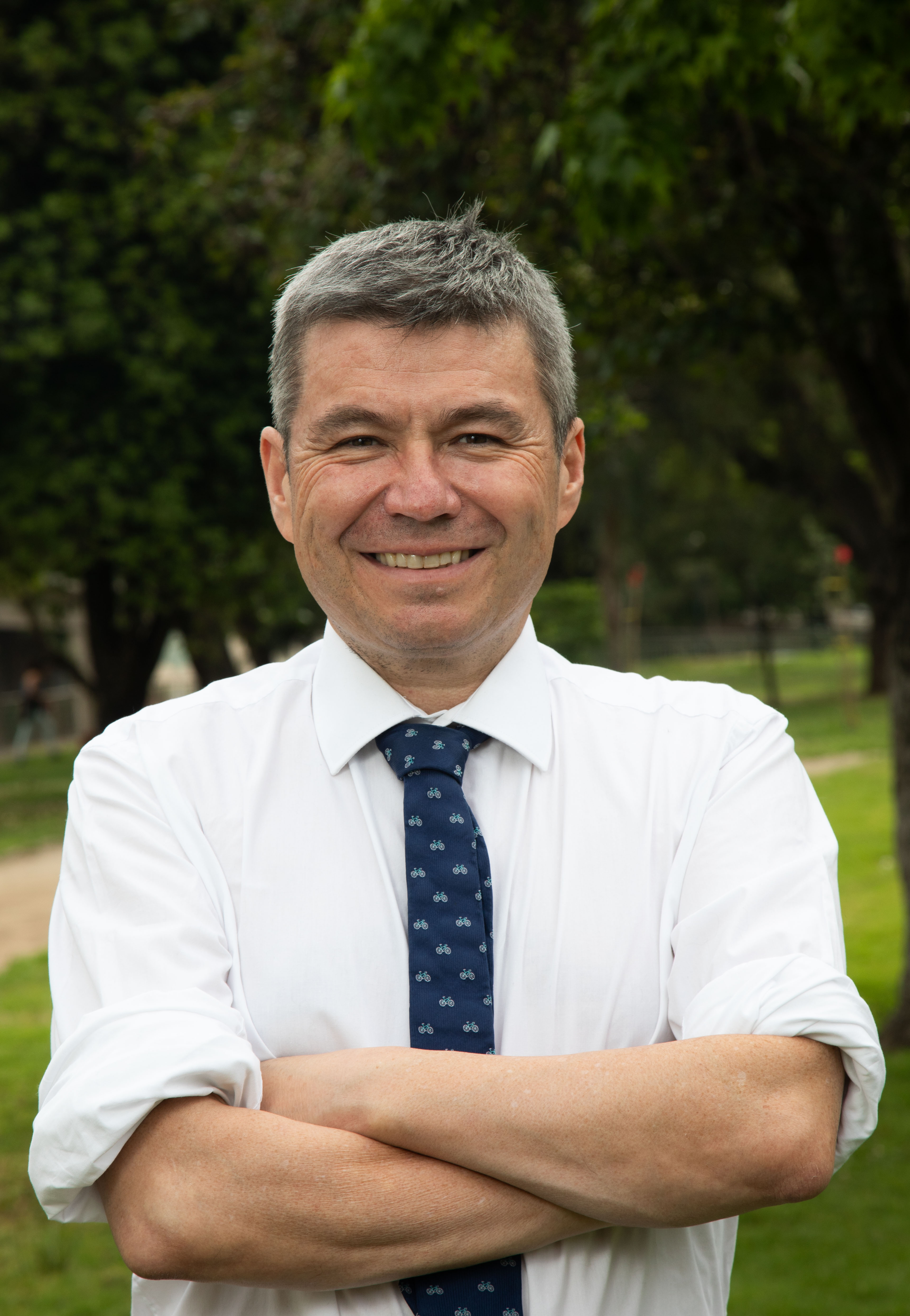

Minister for the Environment
- In office 20 March 2017 – 11 March 2018
- Preceded by: Pablo Badenier
- Succeeded by: Marcela Cubillos

Undersecretary for the Environment
- In office 11 March 2014 – 20 March 2017
- Preceded by: Rodrigo Benítez Ureta
- Succeeded by: Cristián Gutiérrez Pangui

Personal details
- Born: 20 March 1975 (age 51) Santiago, Chile
- Party: Independent
- Spouse: Loreto Stambuk
- Relatives: Javiera Mena (cousin)
- Education: Pontifical Catholic University of Valparaíso (BA); Iowa State University (MA) (PhD)
- Occupation: Politician
- Profession: Biochemical engineer

Marcelo Mena Carrasco (born 20 March 1975) is a Chilean biochemical engineer and politician.

He was minister of the second government of Michelle Bachelet (2014−2018).

== Professional career ==
Between 2007 and 2014, Mena served as director of the School of Environmental Engineering and director of the Sustainability Research Center at Andrés Bello University (UNAB). He also worked as an energy and climate consultant for Fundación Chile. On 11 March 2014, he was appointed Undersecretary of the Environment. On 20 March 2017, he was appointed Minister of the Environment, serving until 2018.

Until May 2019, Mena was manager for climate change research and analytics at the World Bank, where he contributed to the creation of the Coalition of Finance Ministers for Climate Action and the World Bank Climate Adaptation Plan. He subsequently served as adviser on climate change and the circular economy to Kristalina Georgieva and Axel van Trotsenburg until March 2020.

In March 2020, he returned as director of the Climate Action Center at the Pontifical Catholic University of Valparaíso. He also serves as a director of the Meri Foundation and is a member of the Green Hydrogen Advisory Council of the Ministry of Energy.

Mena has published extensively on environmental science, energy, and climate change in scientific journals including Nature Climate Change, Science, Atmospheric Environment, Environmental Science & Technology, Science of the Total Environment, and Atmospheric Chemistry and Physics, among others.

=== Honours and awards ===
Mena received NASA's Group Achievement Award in 2005 for his contributions to the agency's INTEX-A air-quality forecasting project. He was named a Young Leader by El Mercurio in 2008, received the Jóvenes con Éxito award from Diario Financiero in 2009, and was named Environmental Figure of the Year by the Ministry of the Environment in 2011.

In 2012, he was recognized as a Distinguished Alumnus of the University of Iowa and received the university's International Impact Award. In 2017, he received the Climate and Clean Air Award for Individual Achievement from the Climate and Clean Air Coalition of UN Environment. That same year, he accepted the Champions of the Earth award on behalf of President Michelle Bachelet. In 2018, he received recognition from the National Geographic Society in connection with Bachelet's Planetary Leadership Award.

In 2022, Mena was selected as one of the world's 30 leading climate leaders, and in 2023 was included among the 100 Latinos most committed to climate action by Time magazine.

== Political career ==
Mena's first involvement in politics came in 2013, when he joined Andrés Velasco's campaign team during the 2013 Nueva Mayoría presidential primary.

On 11 March 2014, President Michelle Bachelet appointed Mena as Undersecretary of the Environment as part of her second administration. After serving in that position for three years, he was appointed Minister of the Environment on 3 March 2017, succeeding Pablo Badenier. He remained in office until 11 March 2018.

As undersecretary and later minister, Mena oversaw the development of 14 air pollution control plans, including the Santiago Respira programme, and worked with the Ministry of Finance on the design and implementation of environmental taxes on large industrial emitters and motor vehicles.

During his tenure as minister, Mena and Nivia Palma oversaw the creation of the Patagonia National Parks Network, including Patgonia National Park, Pumalín Douglas Tompkins National Park, and Kawésqar National Park. Together with expansions to existing protected areas, the initiative added more than 4.5 million hectares to Chile's conservation system. The project was carried out in partnership with Tompkins Conservation, which donated large tracts of land to the Chilean state.

In marine conservation, Mena led the establishment of protected marine areas around Rapa Nui, the Juan Fernández Islands, Cape Horn, Almirantazgo Sound, and Caleta Tortel. During his time in government, marine protection increased from approximately 4% to 43% of Chile's exclusive economic zone. He also promoted legislation banning plastic bags, the first nationwide law of its kind in the Americas.

Mena was also involved in the controversy surrounding the rejection of the Dominga mine project by the Committee of Ministers in 2017, a decision that contributed to the resignation of the ministers of finance and economy, as well as the undersecretary of finance.
