= Pablo Badenier =

Chilean politician (born 1973)

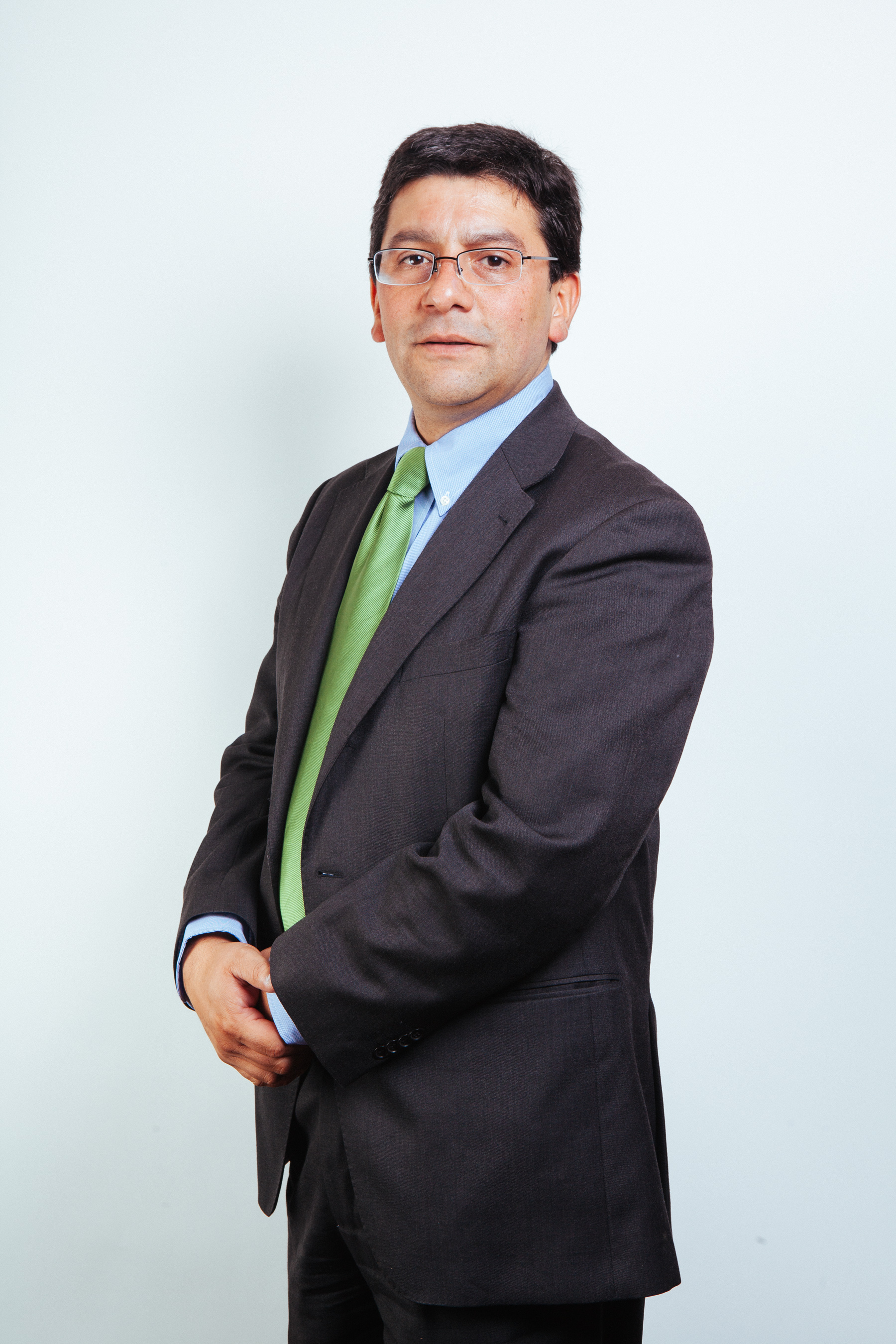

Minister for the Environment
- In office 11 March 2014 – 20 March 2017
- Preceded by: María Ignacia Benítez
- Succeeded by: Marcelo Mena

President of the University of Valparaíso Students Federation
- In office 1995–1996
- Preceded by: Hugo Eduardo Herrera
- Succeeded by: Christian Cofré Villagrán

Personal details
- Born: 6 September 1973 (age 52) Santiago, Chile
- Party: Christian Democratic Party
- Spouse: Cecilia Paz
- Education: University of Valparaíso (BA); University of Chile (MA)
- Occupation: Politician
- Profession: Marine biologist

Pablo Esteban Badenier Martínez (born 6 September 1973) is a Chilean biochemical engineer and politician who was minister of the second government of Michelle Bachelet (2014−2018).

Badenier studied marine biology at the University of Valparaíso (UV) and has a master's degree in management and public policies at the University of Chile. An UV scholar, he has published on Environmental Institutionality and Environmental Project Management.

In the professional field, Badenier has served as regional director of the National Environmental Commission (CONAMA) of the Santiago Metropolitan Region (2003), as executive secretary of the Environment and Territory of the Ministry of Public Works and as associate researcher of the «Centro de Estudios para el dessarrollo» (Center for Development Studies). Likewise, he has been coordinator of the Environment and Energy Matrix Commission of the «Center for Democracy and Community» (CDC).

== Political career ==
In 1995, he was president of the Student Federation of the University of Valparaíso. Similarly, Badenier was national president of the Christian Democratic Youth (2000−2003). Due to his performance in that position, he was elected president of the Christian Democrat Organization of America (CDOA) in 2002.

=== Bachelet's second term ===
In 2013, he was the territorial coordinator of Michelle Bachelet's presidential campaign.

In January 2014, Badenier was appointed by the now elected Bachelet as Minister for the Environment, in which he assumed on 11 March. Then, he resigned from office on 20 March 2017 to take over as campaign manager for Carolina Goic, who run in the 2017 general elections.

On 8 July 2017, he renounced to Goic's political command.
