= Marco Antonio Ávila =

Chilean politician

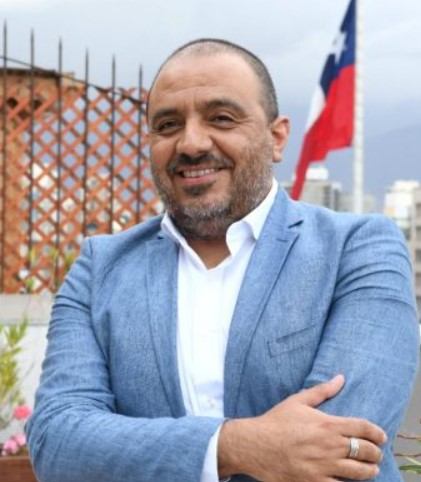

Minister of Education
- In office 11 March 2022 – 16 August 2023
- President: Gabriel Boric
- Preceded by: Raúl Figueroa
- Succeeded by: Nicolás Cataldo

Personal details
- Born: 30 August 1977 (age 49) Santiago, Chile
- Party: Democratic Revolution
- Parent(s): Enrique Ávila; Marta Lavanal
- Education: Cardinal Silva Henríquez Catholic University (BA) (MA)
- Occupation: Politician
- Profession: Teacher of Spanish language

Marco Antonio Ávila Lavanal (born 30 August 1977) is a Chilean politician and teacher who served as Chile's Minister of Education from 11 March 2022 to 16 August 2023.

He is openly gay.

== Biography ==
Marco Antonio Ávila was born in Santiago, the son of Enrique Benito Ávila Hernández and Marta Eugenia Lavanal Araya.

He completed his secondary education at the Andrés Bello High School in San Miguel, and his higher education at the Silva Henríquez Catholic University, where he earned a degree in pedagogy with a specialisation in Spanish language and literature. He later completed a master's degree in education and innovation at the same university.

=== Career ===
He served as head of the Technical-Pedagogical Unit (UTP) and as a school principal in various educational institutions.

Between 2001 and 2008, he worked as a teacher of language and communication at the Belén Educa Foundation. He later served as principal of a school belonging to the Emprender Educational Corporation between 2013 and 2015. During the same period, he was coordinator of the Diploma in Tools for Technical-Pedagogical Management at the Diego Portales University. Likewise, he served as national coordinator of secondary education at the Ministry of Education between 2015 and 2018, during the second government of Michelle Bachelet. He has also worked as content coordinator for EducarChile.

He also served as head of projects at Fundación Chile.

=== Political life ===
A member of the Democratic Revolution (RD) party, on 21 January 2022 he was appointed Minister of Education by then president-elect Gabriel Boric. He assumed office on 11 March of that year, becoming the first holder of the ministry with a teaching background in fourteen years, as well as the first openly homosexual Minister of State in the history of Chile, together with Alexandra Benado at the Ministry of Sports.
