= María Paz Arzola =

Chilean politician (born 1986)

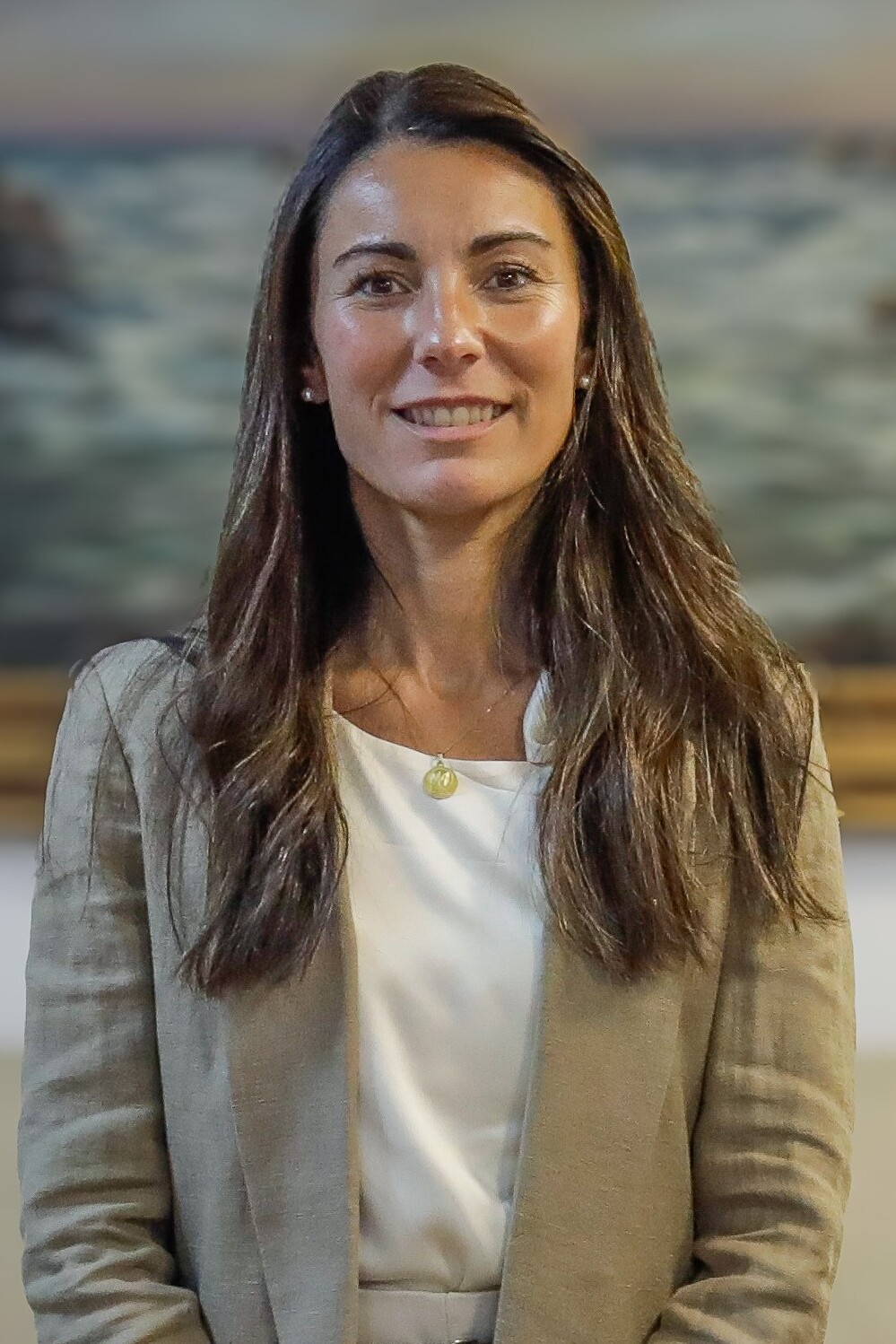

Minister of Education
- Incumbent
- Assumed office 11 March 2026
- President: José Antonio Kast
- Preceded by: Nicolás Cataldo

Personal details
- Born: 5 December 1986 (age 39) Valparaíso, Chile
- Party: Independent
- Education: Pontifical Catholic University of Chile (B.Sc) (M.Sc)
- Occupation: Economist • Professor • Politician

María Paz Arzola González (Santiago, 5 December 1986) is a Chilean economist and politician. In January 2026, she was announced as the next Minister of Education by president-elect José Antonio Kast. She became the Minister of Education of Chile on 11 March 2026.

== Early life and education ==
Paz Arzola was born in Santiago, Chile on 5 December 1986.

She obtained a bachelors degree in business administration from the Catholic University of Chile in 2010 and a masters in economics from the university in 2011. She later also obtained a master's degree in political philosophy and ethics from Adolfo Ibáñez University.

== Career ==
Paz Arzola worked as a researcher and manager at the think tank Libertad y Desarrollo. She was also, for 7 years, an adjunct lecturer at the Catholic University. Paz Arzola also served a government committee to consider Chile's centralised school admission system.
