= Tobías Barros =

Chilean politician (1894-1995)

Minister of Education
- In office 17 August 1955 – 18 April 1956
- President: Carlos Ibáñez del Campo
- Succeeded by: René Vidal Merino
- In office 24 April 1955 – 6 April 1955
- President: Carlos Ibáñez del Campo
- Succeeded by: Kaare Olsen

Minister of National Defense
- In office 25 February 1955 – 13 May 1955
- President: Carlos Ibáñez del Campo
- Preceded by: Enrique Franco
- Succeeded by: Raúl Araya Stiglich
- In office 5 June 1954 – 19 January 1955
- President: Carlos Ibáñez del Campo
- Preceded by: Abdón Parra
- Succeeded by: Enrique Franco Hidalgo

Minister of Foreign Affairs
- In office 15 January 1954 – 5 January 1954
- President: Carlos Ibáñez del Campo
- Preceded by: Oscar Fenner
- Succeeded by: Roberto Aldunate

Ambassador of Chile to Italy
- In office 1952–1953
- President: Carlos Ibáñez del Campo
- Preceded by: Alfredo Rosende
- Succeeded by: Hernán Cuevas

Ambassador of Chile to Germany
- In office 20 July 1940 – 20 January 1943
- President: Pedro Aguirre Cerda; Juan Antonio Ríos
- Preceded by: Luis Varnhagen
- Succeeded by: Hans Frölicher

Personal details
- Born: 15 September 1894 Santiago, Chile
- Died: 25 August 1995 (aged 100) Santiago, Chile

Tobías Barros Ortíz (15 October 1894 – 25 August 1995) was a Chilean politician.
