= Ana Lya Uriarte =

Chilean politician and academic (born 1962)

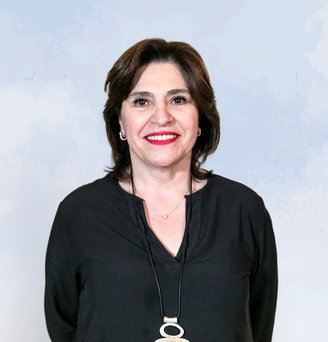
- Uriarte in 2022

Minister Secretary-General of the Presidency
- In office 6 September 2022 – 19 April 2023
- President: Gabriel Boric
- Preceded by: Giorgio Jackson
- Succeeded by: Álvaro Elizalde

Personal details
- Born: 17 July 1962 (age 64) Santiago, Chile
- Party: Socialist Party of Chile
- Children: 3
- Education: University of Chile
- Occupation: Lawyer
- Known for: First Minister of the Environment and former Chief of the Cabinet of The Presidency

Ana Lya del Carmen Uriarte Rodriguez (born 17 July 1962) is a Chilean politician and academic. In 2014, during Michelle Bachelet's second presidential period, Uriarte served as the Chief of the Cabinet of The Presidency. She was also the Minister for the Environment for Chile from 2007 to 2010 and the Secretary General of the Presidency in 2023.

== Early life ==
Uriarte was born in Santiago on 17 July 1962, she was the only child of a lower middle class family. Uriarte became a mother when she was thirteen and her mother and grandmother had to support her. Her father died that same year. She says that the family savings were spent on buying her a caesarian operation. She had to leave her school because it was prohibited for teen mothers to continue studying, so she continued studying in a night school. After two years and when her son was old enough to be care in the day by her grandmother, she returned to high school in another area, where nobody knew her, hiding the fact that she was a teen mother. After a difficult time at school facing discrimination as a single and teen mother, Uriarte continued to succeed due to her hard work. She studied law at the University of Chile and worked part-time at the same time to support her family. She went on to be a student political activist during the 1980s building up the Student Federation of the University of Chile into an important organisation.

She trained as a lawyer and was called to the bar in 1988 in Chile.

== Career ==
When the Catholic church founded the Vicariate of Solidarity to support work in defence of human rights, she worked with Alfonso Insunza helping the victims of General Pinochet as a lawyer. Early in the 1990s she went to Germany for two years where her then-husband was studying International law at Heidelberg University.

Uriarte returned to the University of Chile where she became a Professor of Environmental Law. She taught on the Masters course in Environmental Law. She worked on a human rights programme for the government from 1993 to 2003. She became the Minister of the Environment for Chile in March 2007 and she served until March 2010 under President Michelle Bachelet. One of the controversies that were debated during her ministry was a proposal to dam rivers to flood land and create hydroelectric power. She replaced by María Ignacia Benítez.

In 2012 she was a partner in a Chilean Law firm still specialising in the Environment.

In 2021, she became an Associate Professor of Environmental Law at the University of Chile.

She then returned to politics, serving as Minister Secretary General of the Presidency; she stepped down from this post in April 2023 citing health issues.
