= Ministry of Education (Chile) =

Government ministry of Chile

Logo of the Ministry of Education of Chile

The Ministry of Education (Spanish: Ministerio de Educación, MINEDUC) is the Ministry of State responsible for promoting the development of education at all levels, to assure all people access to basic education, to stimulate scientific and technological research and artistic creation, and the protection and enhancement of cultural heritage of the nation of Chile.

The current Minister of Education since 11 March 2026 is María Paz Arzola, under José Antonio Kast's presidency.

== History ==
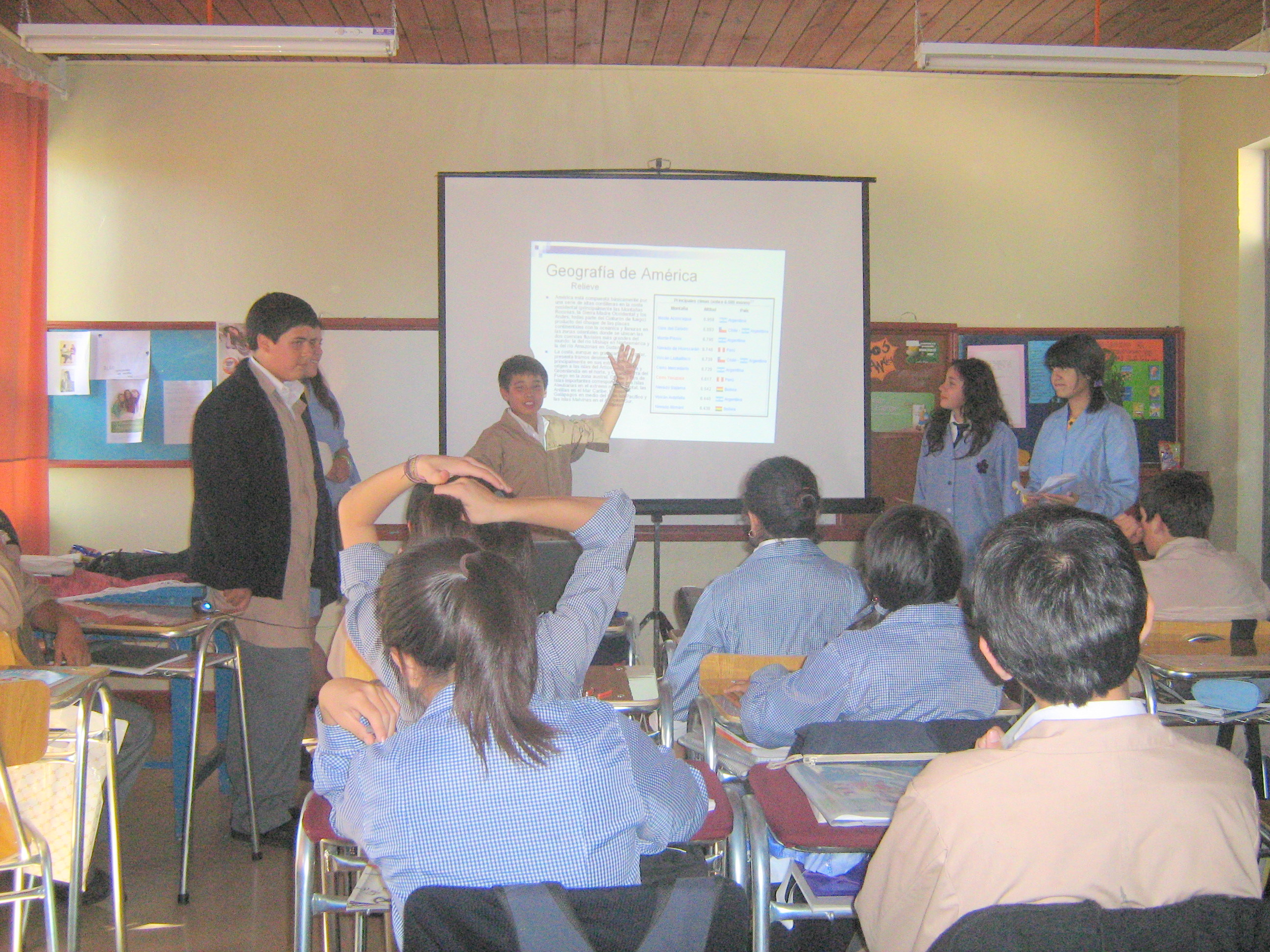
Chilean students in 2008.

The ministry began in 1837 as part of the Ministry of Justice and Religious Instruction. In those years the ministry was responsible for overseeing educational institutions such as the Instituto Nacional de Chile and Universidad de Chile. Since 1887 it was named Ministry of Justice and Public Instruction.

The Ministry of Education was separated from the Ministry of Justice in 1927, and became responsible for primary education, secondary education, vocational education, libraries, archives and museums.

During the government of Eduardo Frei Montalva, the following institutions were created under Ministry of Education:

- Junta Nacional de Auxilio Escolar y Becas/National Board of School Assistance and Scholarships (JUNAEB)
- Centro de Perfeccionamiento, Experimentación e Investigaciones Pedagógicas/Center for Improvement, Educational Research and Experimentation (CPEIP)
- Junta Nacional de Jardines Infantiles/National Board of Daycare (JUNJI)

== List of ministers of education ==
Picture	Name	Entered office	Exited office	Party	Appointed by
	Eduardo Barrios Hudtwalcker	17 November 1927	17 October 1928	Ind	Carlos Ibáñez del Campo
	Pablo Ramírez Rodríguez	17 October 1928	11 March 1929	PR	Carlos Ibáñez del Campo
	Mariano Navarrete	11 March 1929	5 August 1930	Militar	Carlos Ibáñez del Campo
	Bartolomé Blanche Espejo	5 August 1930	26 October 1930	Militar	Carlos Ibáñez del Campo
	Alberto Edwards Vives	26 October 1930	28 April 1931	PN	Carlos Ibáñez del Campo
	Gustavo Lira Manso	28 April 1931	13 July 1931	Ind	Carlos Ibáñez del Campo
	José Manuel Ríos	13 July 1931	22 July 1931	PL	Carlos Ibáñez del Campo
	Miguel Letelier	22 July 1931	23 July 1931	PN	Carlos Ibáñez del Campo
	Gustavo Lira Manso	23 July 1931	26 July 1931	PN	Carlos Ibáñez del Campo
	Pedro Godoy Pérez	26 July 1931	27 July 1931	Ind	Pedro Opazo
	Pedro Godoy Pérez	27 July 1931	20 August 1931	Ind	Juan Esteban Montero
	Pedro Godoy Pérez	20 August 1931	3 September 1931	Ind	Manuel Trucco
	Leonardo Guzmán Cortés	3 September 1931	15 November 1931	PR	Manuel Trucco
	Santiago Labarca Labarca	15 November 1931	7 April 1932	PR	Juan Esteban Montero
	Alfredo Bravo Zamora	7 April 1932	5 June 1932	PR	Juan Esteban Montero
	Eugenio González Rojas	5 June 1932	17 June 1932	Ind	Socialist Junta
	Carlos Soto Rengifo	17 June 1932	8 July 1932		Socialist Junta
	Carlos Soto Rengifo	8 July 1932	1 August 1932		Carlos Dávila
	Luis Cruz Ocampo	1 August 1932	14 September 1932	Ind	Carlos Dávila
	Luis Cruz Ocampo	14 September 1932	4 October 1932	Ind	Bartolomé Blanche
	Alberto Coddou Ortiz	4 October 1932	24 December 1932	Ind	Abraham Oyanedel
	Domingo Durán	24 December 1932	19 April 1934	PR	Arturo Alessandri
	Osvaldo Vial	19 April 1934	26 August 1935	PL	Arturo Alessandri
	Francisco Garcés Gana	26 August 1935	24 March 1937	PL	Arturo Alessandri
	Guillermo Correa	24 March 1937	24 December 1938	PL	Arturo Alessandri
	Rudecindo Ortega	24 December 1938	8 February 1940	PR	Pedro Aguirre Cerda
	Juan Antonio Iribarren	8 February 1940	10 June 1941	PR	Pedro Aguirre Cerda
	Raimundo del Río	10 June 1941	6 October 1941	PL	Pedro Aguirre Cerda
	Ulises Vergara	6 October 1941	10 October 1941	PR	Pedro Aguirre Cerda
	Ulises Vergara	10 October 1941	2 April 1942	PR	Jerónimo Méndez
	Oscar Bustos Aburto	2 April 1942	21 October 1942	PR	Juan Antonio Ríos
	Benjamín Claro Velasco	21 October 1942	7 June 1943	PR	Juan Antonio Ríos
	Enrique Marshall Herrera	7 June 1943	1 September 1943	Ind	Juan Antonio Ríos
	Benjamín Claro Velasco	1 September 1943	6 October 1944	PR	Juan Antonio Ríos
	Enrique Marshall Herrera	6 October 1944	14 May 1945	Ind	Juan Antonio Ríos
	Juan Antonio Iribarren Cabezas	14 May 1945	3 February 1946	PR	Juan Antonio Ríos
	Benjamín Claro Velasco	3 February 1946	6 September 1946	PR	Juan Antonio Ríos
	Humberto Enríquez	6 September 1946	3 November 1946	PR	Alfredo Duhalde
	Alejandro Ríos Valdivia	3 November 1946	2 August 1947	PR	Gabriel González Videla
	Enrique Molina Garmendia	2 August 1947	7 July 1948	Ind	Gabriel González Videla
	Ulises Vergara	7 July 1948	22 July 1948	PR	Gabriel González Videla
	Armando Mallet	22 July 1948	7 February 1950	PSA	Gabriel González Videla
	Manuel Rodríguez Valenzuela	7 February 1950	27 February 1950	Ind	Gabriel González Videla
	Bernardo Leighton Guzmán	27 February 1950	4 February 1952	FN	Gabriel González Videla
	Eliodoro Domínguez	4 February 1952	29 July 1952	PSA	Gabriel González Videla
	Luis Cruz Ocampo	29 July 1952	3 November 1952	Ind	Gabriel González Videla
	María Teresa del Canto Molina	3 November 1952	1 April 1953	PF	Carlos Ibáñez del Campo
	Juan Gómez Millas	1 April 1953	14 August 1953	PAL	Carlos Ibáñez del Campo
	Oscar Fenner	14 August 1953	14 October 1953	Militar	Carlos Ibáñez del Campo
	Eduardo Barrios Hudtwalcker	14 October 1953	5 June 1954	Ind	Carlos Ibáñez del Campo
	Oscar Herrera Palacios	5 June 1954	24 March 1955	Ind	Carlos Ibáñez del Campo
	Tobías Barros	24 March 1955	6 April 1955	Militar	Carlos Ibáñez del Campo
	Kaare Olsen	6 April 1955	2 June 1955	Militar	Carlos Ibáñez del Campo
	Oscar Herrera Palacios	2 June 1955	17 August 1955	Ind	Carlos Ibáñez del Campo
	Tobías Barros	17 August 1955	18 April 1956	Militar	Carlos Ibáñez del Campo
	René Vidal Merino	18 April 1956	27 August 1956	Ind	Carlos Ibáñez del Campo
	Francisco Bórquez	27 August 1956	23 April 1957	Ind	Carlos Ibáñez del Campo
	Manuel Quintana Oyarzún	23 April 1957	28 October 1957	Ind	Carlos Ibáñez del Campo
	Diego Barros Ortiz	28 October 1957	3 November 1958	Militar	Carlos Ibáñez del Campo
	Francisco Cereceda Cisternas	3 November 1958	15 September 1960	PL	Jorge Alessandri
	Eduardo Moore Montero	15 September 1960	5 October 1961	PL	Jorge Alessandri
	Patricio Barros Alemparte	5 October 1961	26 September 1963	PL	Jorge Alessandri
	Alejandro Garretón Silva	26 September 1963	3 November 1964	Ind	Jorge Alessandri
	Juan Gómez Millas	3 November 1964	17 February 1968	Ind	Eduardo Frei Montalva
	William Thayer Arteaga	17 February 1968	4 March 1968	PDC	Eduardo Frei Montalva
	Máximo Pacheco Gómez	4 March 1968	3 November 1970	PDC	Eduardo Frei Montalva
	Mario Astorga	3 November 1970	28 January 1972	PR	Salvador Allende
	Alejandro Ríos Valdivia	28 January 1972	17 June 1972	PR	Salvador Allende
	Aníbal Palma	17 June 1972	2 November 1972	PR	Salvador Allende
	Jorge Tapia Valdés	2 November 1972	5 July 1973	PR	Salvador Allende
	Edgardo Enríquez Frodden	5 July 1973	11 September 1973	PR	Salvador Allende
	José Navarro Tobar	12 September 1973	27 September 1973	IND	Augusto Pinochet
	Hugo Castro Jiménez	27 September 1973	16 May 1975	IND	Augusto Pinochet
	Arturo Troncoso	16 May 1975	3 December 1976	IND	Augusto Pinochet
	Luis Niemann	3 December 1976	26 December 1978	IND	Augusto Pinochet
	Gonzalo Vial Correa	26 December 1978	14 December 1979	IND	Augusto Pinochet
	Alfredo Prieto Bafalluy	14 December 1979	22 April 1982	IND	Augusto Pinochet
	Álvaro Arriagada Norambuena	22 April 1982	14 February 1983	IND	Augusto Pinochet
	Mónica Madariaga	14 February 1983	19 October 1983	IND	Augusto Pinochet
	Horacio Aránguiz Donoso	19 October 1983	29 July 1985	IND	Augusto Pinochet
	Sergio Gaete	29 July 1985	11 July 1987	IND	Augusto Pinochet
	Juan Antonio Guzmán	11 July 1987	5 June 1989	IND	Augusto Pinochet
	René Salamé	5 June 1989	11 March 1990	Militar	Augusto Pinochet
	Ricardo Lagos	11 March 1990	28 September 1992	PS	Patricio Aylwin
	Jorge Arrate	28 September 1992	11 March 1994	PS	Patricio Aylwin
	Ernesto Schiefelbein	11 March 1994	20 September 1994	DC	Eduardo Frei Ruiz-Tagle
	Sergio Molina	20 September 1994	28 September 1996	PPD	Eduardo Frei Ruiz-Tagle
	José Pablo Arellano	28 September 1996	11 March 2000	DC	Eduardo Frei Ruiz-Tagle
	Mariana Aylwin	11 March 2000	3 March 2003	DC	Ricardo Lagos
	Sergio Bitar	3 March 2003	14 December 2005	PPD	Ricardo Lagos
	Marigen Hornkohl	14 December 2005	13 March 2006	DC	Ricardo Lagos
	Martín Zilic	11 March 2006	14 June 2006	DC	Michelle Bachelet
	Yasna Provoste	14 June 2006	17 April 2008	DC	Michelle Bachelet
	Mónica Jiménez	14 April 2008	13 March 2010	DC	Michelle Bachelet
	Joaquín Lavín	11 March 2010	18 July 2011	UDI	Sebastián Piñera
	Felipe Bulnes	18 July 2011	29 December 2011	RN	Sebastián Piñera
	Harald Beyer	29 December 2011	22 April 2013	IND	Sebastián Piñera
	Carolina Schmidt	22 April 2013	11 March 2014	IND	Sebastián Piñera
	Nicolás Eyzaguirre	11 March 2014	27 June 2015	PPD	Michelle Bachelet
	Adriana Delpiano	27 June 2015	11 March 2018	PPD	Michelle Bachelet
	Gerardo Varela	11 March 2018	9 August 2018	IND	Sebastián Piñera
	Marcela Cubillos	9 August 2018	28 February 2020	UDI	Sebastián Piñera
	Raúl Figueroa	28 February 2020	11 March 2022	IND	Sebastián Piñera
	Marco Antonio Ávila	11 March 2022	16 August 2023	Democratic Revolution	Gabriel Boric
	Nicolás Cataldo	16 August 2023	11 March 2026	Communist	Gabriel Boric
	María Paz Arzola	11 March 2026	Incumbent	Ind.	José Antonio Kast

PR – Partido Radical
PS – Partido Socialista
PDC – Partido Democrata Cristiano
PL – Partido Liberal
Ind – Independent
PAL – Partido Agrario Laborista
PF – Partido Femenino de Chile
PSA – Partido Socialista Auténtico
FN – Falange Nacional
PN – Partido Nacional
UDI – Unión Demócrata Independiente
RN – Renovación Nacional
PPD – Partido por la Democracia

== See also ==
- Education in Chile
