= María Ignacia Benítez =

Chilean Minister of the Environment (1958–2019)

María Ignacia Benítez Pereira
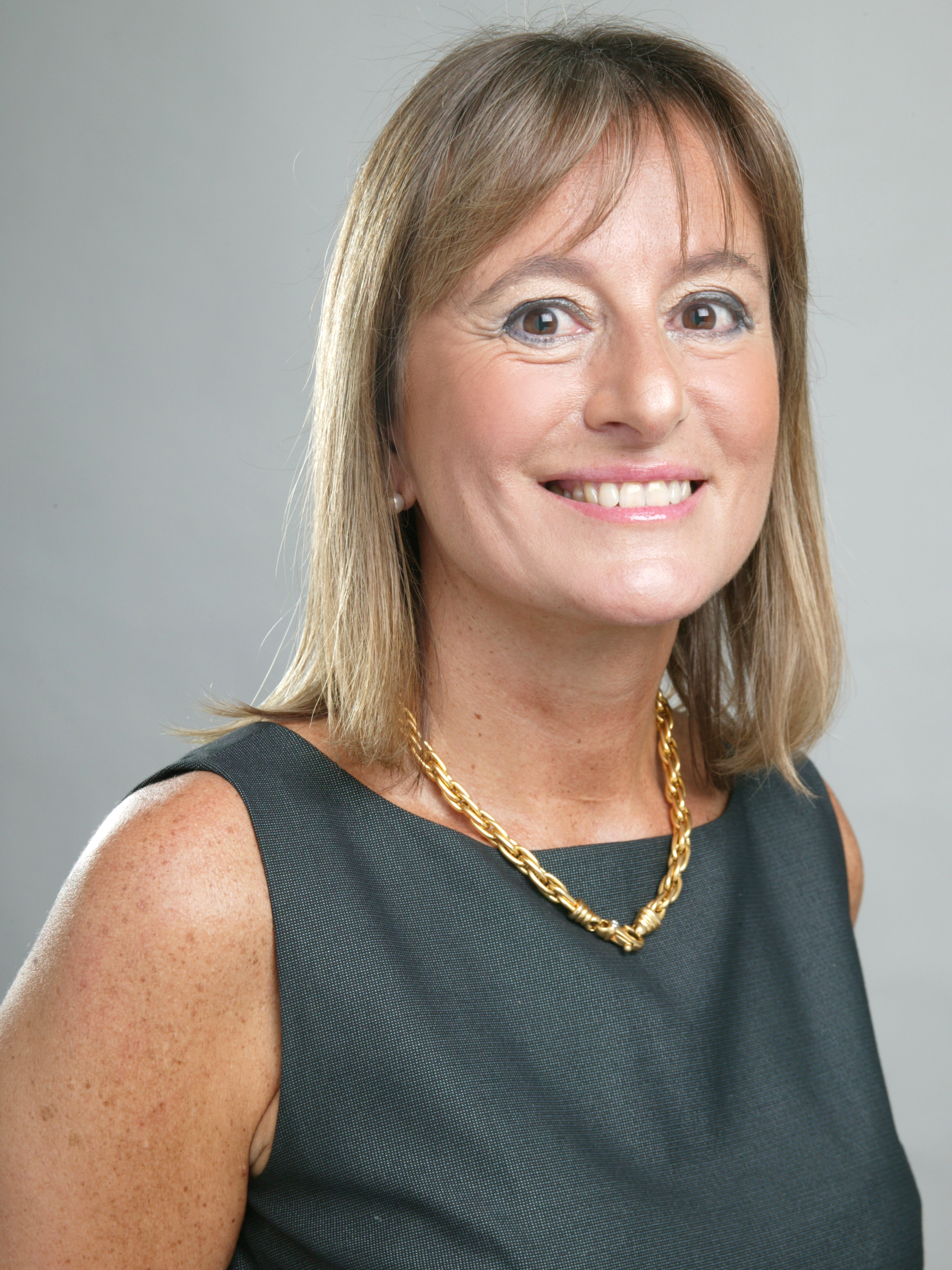

Minister for the Environment
- In office 9 October 2010 – 11 March 2014
- President: Sebastián Pinera
- Preceded by: Position established
- Succeeded by: Pablo Badenier

Personal details
- Born: María Ignacia Benítez; 1 August 1958 Viña del Mar
- Died: 28 February 2019 (aged 60) Santiago, Chile
- Party: Independent Democratic Union

María Ignacia Benítez (1 August 1958 – 28 February 2019) was the Chilean Minister of the Environment, between 2010 and 2014.

== Biography ==
Benítez was born in Viña del Mar in Chile. She was the oldest of five children. She went to school locally before studying civil engineering at the University of Chile.

She served under General Pinochet before leaving to be a consultant.

In March 2010, she was appointed to be the Minister of the Environment by the President of Chile Sebastián Piñera despite conflicts of interest with her business interests. The previous minister was Ana Lya Uriarte.

In 2012, she had a public row with the Supreme Court who were holding up a contract she was interested in. Accusations of "improper and unacceptable interference" were made against her.

In 2018 she joined the board of the Barrick Gold Corporation.

== Private life and death ==
Benítez was married and had three children. She died of pancreatic cancer in February 2019.
