= Bunny McDiarmid =

New Zealand activist (born 1957/1958)

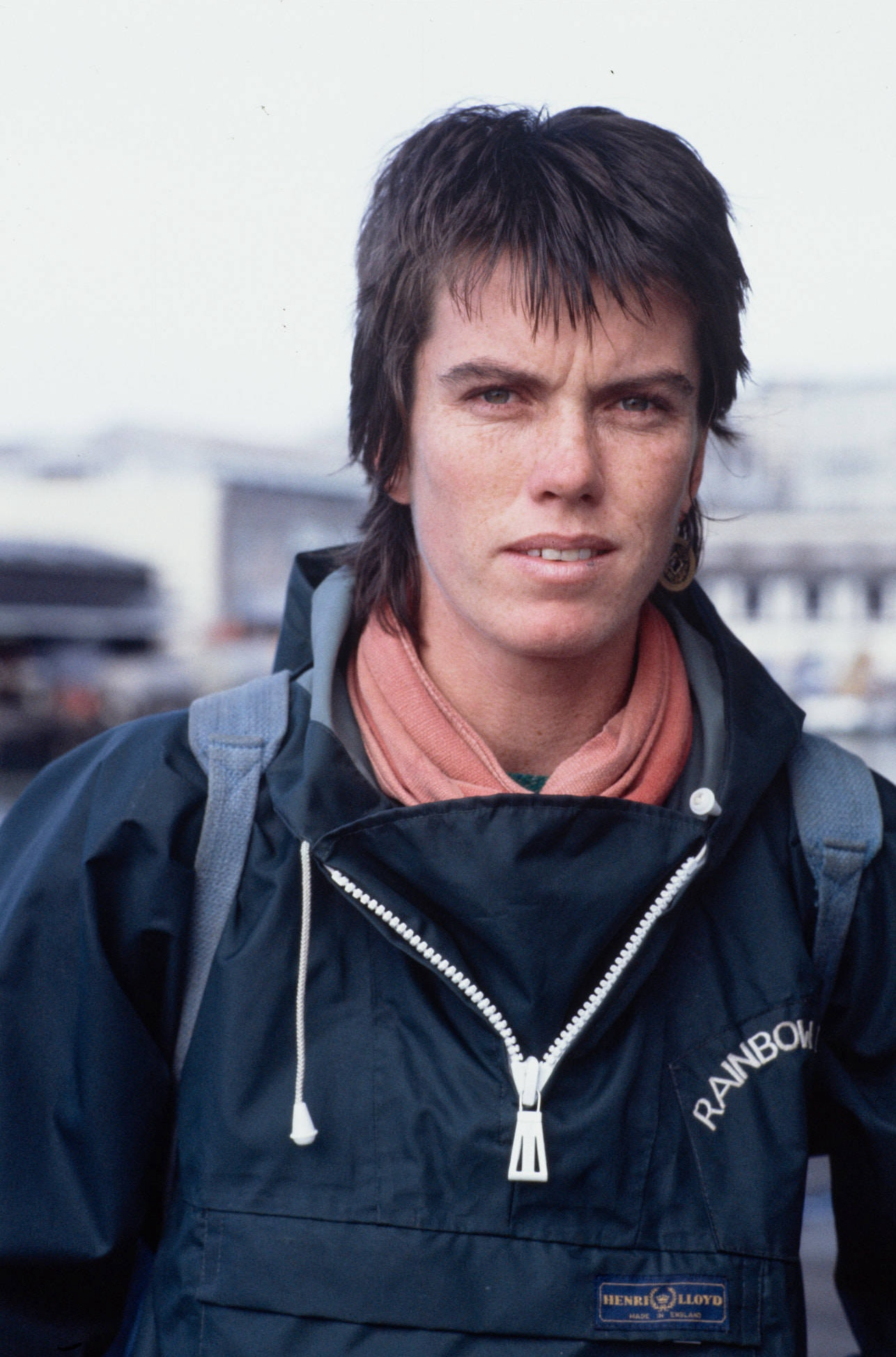
- McDiarmid in 1985
- Born: 1957 or 1958; Christchurch, New Zealand
- Occupation: Environmental activist
- Known for: Executive director, Greenpeace New Zealand

Bunny McDiarmid (born 1957 or 1958 in Christchurch) is an environmental activist from New Zealand, who has been co-Executive Director of the non-governmental organization Greenpeace International since 2016. She has been an activist for more than 30 years, leading national and international campaigns. McDiarmid was a volunteer on the Rainbow Warrior in 1984, and established a regional office in the Pacific working on climate, forests and oceans. She also coordinated the international nuclear and deep sea work for several years.

== Life ==
Bunny McDiarmid is an environmental activist from New Zealand, she has been, (with Jennifer Morgan) Executive Director of the Greenpeace International since April 4, 2016. She has been an activist for more than 30 years, leading national and international campaigns including in her native New Zealand. McDiarmid has been based in Amsterdam as well as in New Zealand.

McDiarmid began her career at Greenpeace as a volunteer on the anti-nuclear ship The Fri in the 1980s, and then was a crew member on the Rainbow Warrior in 1984. She continued campaigning against French nuclear testing in the Pacific until it ended in 1996, and was involved in the relocation of the Rongelap people from their contaminated homeland. She established a regional office in the Pacific working on climate, forests and oceans. She also coordinated the international nuclear and deep sea work for several years. She is a shareholder in the Awaawaroa eco-village. McDiarmid was executive director of Greenpeace New Zealand for ten years, resigning in 2015.
