= Nicolás Cataldo =

Chilean politician

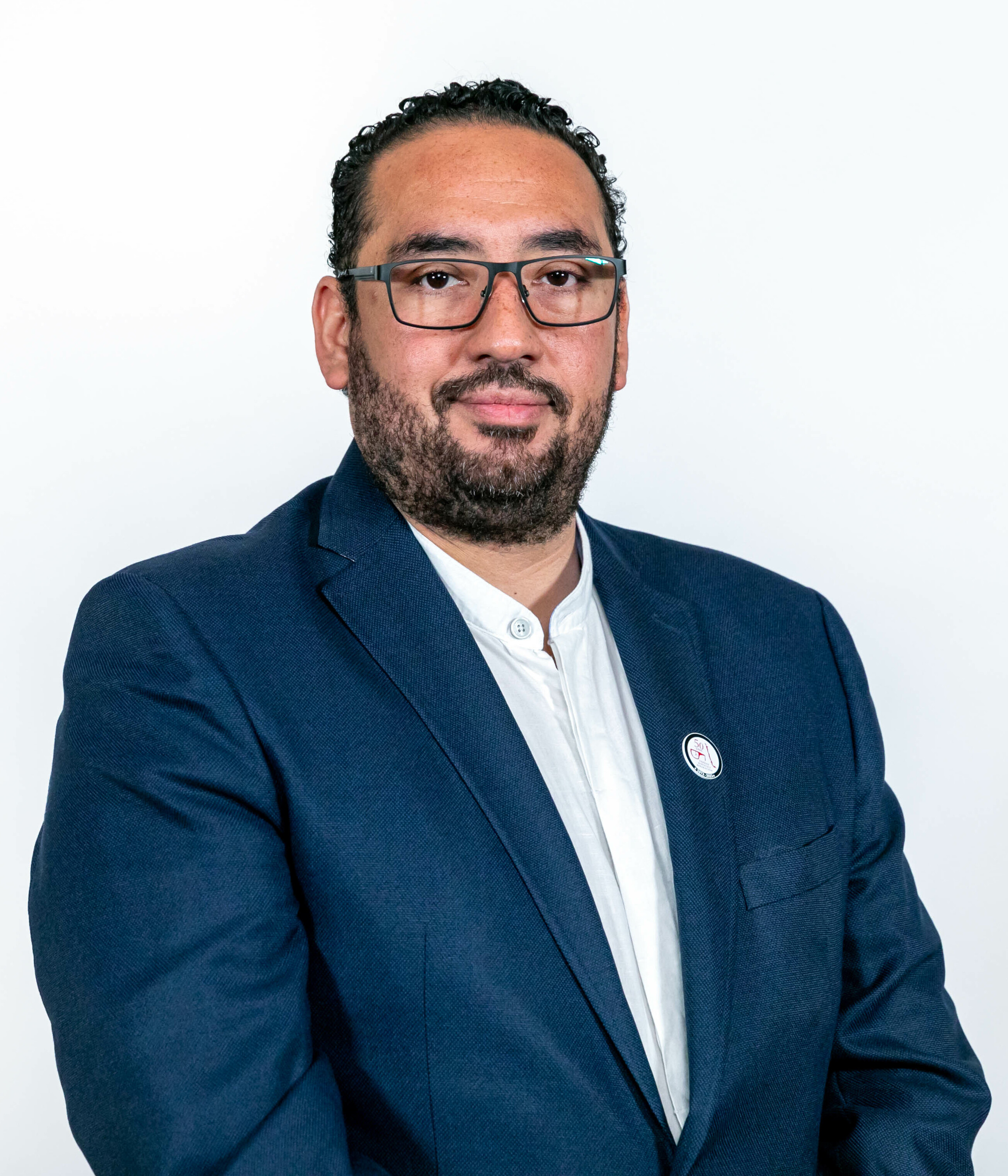
- Nicolás Cataldo in 2023.

Minister of Education
- In office 16 August 2023 – 11 March 2026
- President: Gabriel Boric
- Preceded by: Marco Antonio Ávila
- Succeeded by: María Paz Arzola

Undersecretary of Regional Development
- In office 8 September 2022 – 16 August 2023
- President: Gabriel Boric
- Preceded by: Miguel Crispi
- Succeeded by: Francisca Perales

Undersecretary of Education
- In office 11 March 2022 – 8 September 2022
- President: Gabriel Boric
- Preceded by: Jorge Poblete
- Succeeded by: Gabriel Bosque

Personal details
- Born: 22 June 1984 (age 42) Valparaíso, Chile
- Education: University of Valparaíso; Universidad Mayor (MA)

Nicolás Cataldo Astorga (born 22 June 1984) is a Chilean politician who has been serving as Minister of Education since 16 August 2023. Previously, he served as the Undersecretary of Regional Development and Education between 2022 and 2023.

== Family and education ==
He completed his primary education at School E-282 in Viña del Mar, and continued his secondary education at the Benjamín Vicuña Mackenna High School in the same city and at the Liceo Eduardo de la Barra in Valparaíso. He later pursued higher education in pedagogy in history and social sciences at the University of Valparaíso (UV). Subsequently, he completed postgraduate studies and obtained a master's degree in emotional education at Universidad Mayor.

He is married to feminist activist Danae Prado Carmona, who currently serves as a regional councillor for the Santiago Metropolitan Region. Together, they are the parents of two children: Salvador Antonio and Matilde Violeta.

== Political career ==
He has been a member of the Communist Party of Chile (PCCh) since 1998. During his years as a student, he was active as a secondary and university student leader, joining the Federation of Students of the University of Valparaíso (FEUV).

He has exercised his profession with a specialization in the design of public policy and legislative procedures, working within the public administration at both central and local levels. Between 2010 and 2013, he served as a technical advisor to the Department of Education and Professional Development of the Colegio de Profesores de Chile (CP), and was part of the editorial team of the journal Docencia. In parallel, in 2013, he worked as a legislative advisor on education for the PC parliamentary caucus, and in 2014 he assumed the role of chief of staff and legislative advisor on education to then Communist deputy Camila Vallejo.

During the second government of Michelle Bachelet, between 2015 and 2018, he worked on the legislative team of the Ministry of Education, participating in the processing of bills related to the creation of the “Teacher Professional Development System”, the “New Public Education” framework, “Higher Education”, teacher retirement incentive laws, and serving as head of the bill for the “Statute of Education Assistants”. These initiatives formed part of the education reform promoted by the government at the time.

At the local level, following the enactment of Law No. 21,040, which created the new Public Education System, he also worked in 2018 on the implementation of one of the first Local Public Education Services (SLEP), the Barrancas Local Education Service, which covers the Santiago communes of Cerro Navia, Lo Prado and Pudahuel. Subsequently, and until January 2022, he served as chief of staff at the Municipality of Cerro Navia.

In February 2022, he was appointed by then president-elect Gabriel Boric as head of the Undersecretariat of Education, becoming the first member of the Communist Party to hold the position. He assumed office on 11 March of that year, with the formal start of the administration.

On 6 September 2022, his appointment as Undersecretary of the Interior was announced, replacing Socialist Manuel Monsalve, as part of President Gabriel Boric’s first cabinet reshuffle. However, minutes later, the appointment was not formalized after the disclosure of social media posts he had published on Twitter between 2011 and 2013, in which he criticized the actions of the Carabineros de Chile.

Two days later, Boric implemented changes in six undersecretariats of state, including Education, where he was replaced by fellow Communist Party member Gabriel Bosque. Consequently, he was reassigned within the cabinet as Undersecretary of Regional Development and Administrative Affairs, replacing Miguel Crispi, becoming the first member of the Communist Party to lead that office.
