= Marcela Cubillos =

Chilean lawyer and politician (born 1967)

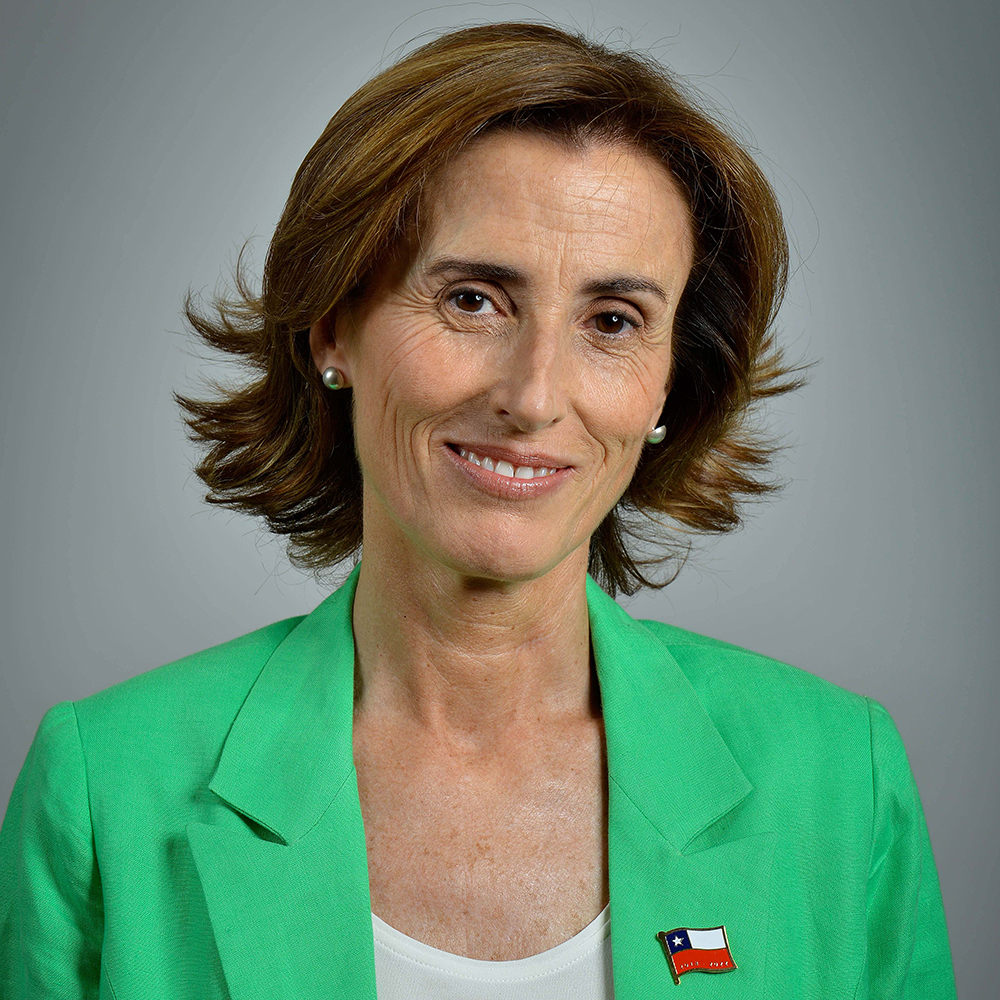
- Official portrait (2018)

Member of the Constitutional Convention
- In office 4 July 2021 – 4 July 2022
- Constituency: 11th District

Minister of Education
- In office 9 August 2018 – 28 February 2020
- President: Sebastián Piñera
- Preceded by: Gerardo Varela
- Succeeded by: Raúl Figueroa

Minister for the Environment
- In office 11 March 2018 – 9 August 2018
- President: Sebastián Piñera
- Preceded by: Marcelo Mena
- Succeeded by: Carolina Schmidt

Member of the Chamber of Deputies
- In office 11 March 2002 – 11 March 2010
- Preceded by: Alberto Espina
- Succeeded by: Marcela Sabat
- Constituency: 21st District

Personal details
- Born: 2 February 1967 (age 59) Santiago, Chile
- Party: Unión Demócrata Independiente (UDI)
- Spouse(s): José Antonio Silva; Andrés Allamand
- Children: Three
- Parent(s): Hernán Cubillos; Marcela Sigall
- Relatives: Felipe Cubillos (brother)
- Education: Pontifical Catholic University of Chile (LL.B)
- Occupation: Politician
- Profession: Lawyer

Marcela Cubillos Sigall (born 2 February 1967) is a Chilean lawyer, politician, and constitutional delegate, widely known for her active role in her country's political and institutional debates over the last two decades.

Previously affiliated with the conservative Independent Democratic Union (UDI), she has held multiple public offices, including Minister for the Environment and Minister of Education during the second administration of President Sebastián Piñera.

In 2021, Cubillos was elected to the Constitutional Convention, becoming one of the most visible voices of the Chilean political right in the body tasked with drafting a new constitution. Known for her firm positions on education policy, environmental management, and national unity, she consistently defended free market principles, traditional institutions, and the unitary state model, often clashing with the more progressive and plurinational proposals advanced by the convention's left-wing majority.

Her presence in both executive and constituent roles has made her one of the leading female figures of Chile's contemporary right, as well as a polarizing figure in public discourse. Following the rejection of the proposed new constitution in the 2022 referendum, she has continued to influence conservative strategy in political and academic spaces.

== Biography ==
Born in Viña del Mar on 2 February 1967, the daughter of Hernán Cubillos, a former naval officer and diplomat, and Marcela Sigall Ortúzar. She completed her secondary education at Colegio La Maisonette in Viña.

She earned a law degree from the Pontifical Catholic University of Chile.

== Political career ==
=== Rising ===
Cubillos began her political involvement in the UDI's youth wing and was later elected deputy for District 21 (2002–2010). She was appointed Minister for the Environment on 11 March 2018, serving until 9 August 2018, when she became Minister of Education, succeeding Gerardo Varela.

As Education Minister, she promoted the controversial «Aula Segura» policy granting schools greater disciplinary authority, which sparked opposition, especially among students and teachers.

She resigned on 28 February 2020 and subsequently joined the Constitutional Convention in mid-2021.

=== Constitutional Convention ===
In the 2021 Constitutional elections, Cubillos successfully ran for District 11 as part of the center-right Chile Vamos coalition. She was among the conservative delegates in a left-leaning assembly, often criticizing the proposed plurinational constitutional drafts—labeling them indigenist—and arguing they undermined national unity.

=== Later developments ===
Following the Convention's rejection of the draft in September 2022, Cubillos continued as a vocal critic of left-leaning proposals and remained active in UDI circles.

In 2024, a legal investigation was launched regarding her monthly salary of approximately 17 million CLP (~USD 18,500) while teaching at Universidad San Sebastián; the Fiscalía Centro Norte of Santiago opened a probe into potential corruption or irregular funding.
