= Harald Beyer (politician) =

Chilean economist and researcher

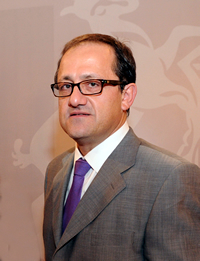

Minister of Education of Chile
- In office 29 December 2011 – 17 April 2013
- President: Sebastián Piñera
- Preceded by: Felipe Bulnes
- Succeeded by: Carolina Schmidt

Personal details
- Born: 2 April 1964 (age 62) Osorno, Chile
- Party: Independent
- Spouse: Silvia Díaz Carmona (1989-)
- Children: 3
- Education: Universidad de Chile (BS); UCLA (MBA)
- Profession: Economist

Harald Ricardo Beyer Burgos (born 2 April 1964) is a Chilean economist and researcher. Former member of the Presidential Advisory Councils of Education under the government of Michelle Bachelet.

He served as Minister of Education of Chile from 29 December 2011 to 17 April 2013, when he was impeached because of his failure to address for-profit activity in universities (which is illegal).

He subsequently became executive director of the Centro de Estudios Públicos, a right-wing think tank in Santiago under the presidency of Eliodoro Matte. He is now vice-chancellor of the Adolfo Ibáñez University.

== Biography ==
He was born in Osorno and completed his primary and secondary education at the German Institute (Instituto Alemán) of his hometown. He later studied business administration at the University of Chile and earned a Ph.D. in economics from the University of California, Los Angeles (UCLA).

He has been noted for his work as a researcher at the Centro de Estudios Públicos (CEP), which he joined in 1987, and where he later served as deputy director. In March 2014, he became director of the CEP, a position he held until January 2018.

In March 2018, he assumed the position of rector of the Adolfo Ibáñez University (UAI), succeeding Andrés Benítez, who had served in that role for 17 years. Although his term was renewed for another five-year period in 2023, in January 2024 Beyer publicly announced his resignation from the university’s board as rector, effective 31 March 2024.

== Political career ==
He was a member of the Presidential Advisory Councils on Education —formed in 2006 following that year's student protests— as well as on Pension Reform and Work and Equity, all convened by President Michelle Bachelet. In 2009, he served as coordinator of the Education area of the "Tantauco" groups, from which the government program for the presidential candidacy of Sebastián Piñera was drafted.

Following Piñera’s inauguration as president in 2010, Beyer joined the Panel of Experts for Quality Education and the Advisory Commission for the Definition of the Minimum Wage, and was appointed presidential representative to the University Council of the University of Chile (2010–2011).

During 2011, he opposed the demand for free education for all, raised by the student movement of that year, although he also stated that for-profit universities “will never be good universities.”

In December 2012, he co-founded the political movement Political Evolution (Evópoli), together with Felipe Kast, Luciano Cruz-Coke, and Juan Sebastián Montes.

=== Minister of Education ===
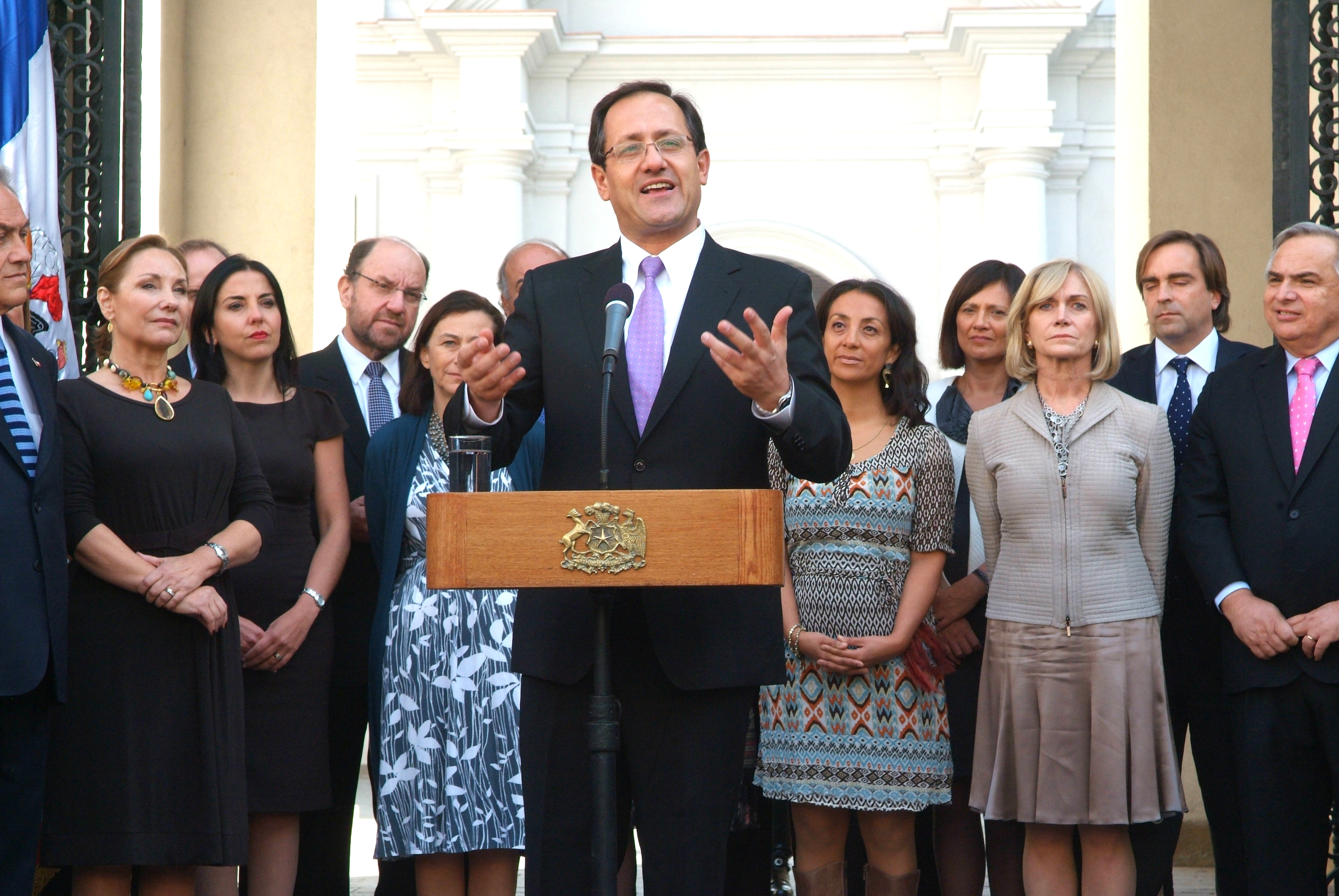
Beyer at La Moneda Palace the day after his dismissal.

On 29 December 2011, he was appointed Minister of Education following the resignation of Felipe Bulnes.

On 4 April 2013, by a vote of 58 to 56, the Chamber of Deputies of Chile approved the admissibility of an impeachment filed against him, alleging that he had failed to supervise the existence of profit-making activities in Chilean universities.

The accusation was controversial, as it was reported that some paragraphs had been copied from a previous accusation referring to duties of a different ministry.

Beyer was suspended from his duties until the Senate of Chile reviewed the accusation, acting as a jury to determine his guilt or innocence.

On 17 April 2013, the Senate found him guilty on one of the three chapters of the constitutional accusation—specifically for failing to oversee the existence of profit in higher education despite complaints, constituting “omission of ministerial duties”—by 20 votes in favor and 18 against. He was consequently removed from office as Minister of Education and barred from holding public office until 2018.
