= Camilo Ballesteros =

Chilean activist

Camilo Ballesteros Briones
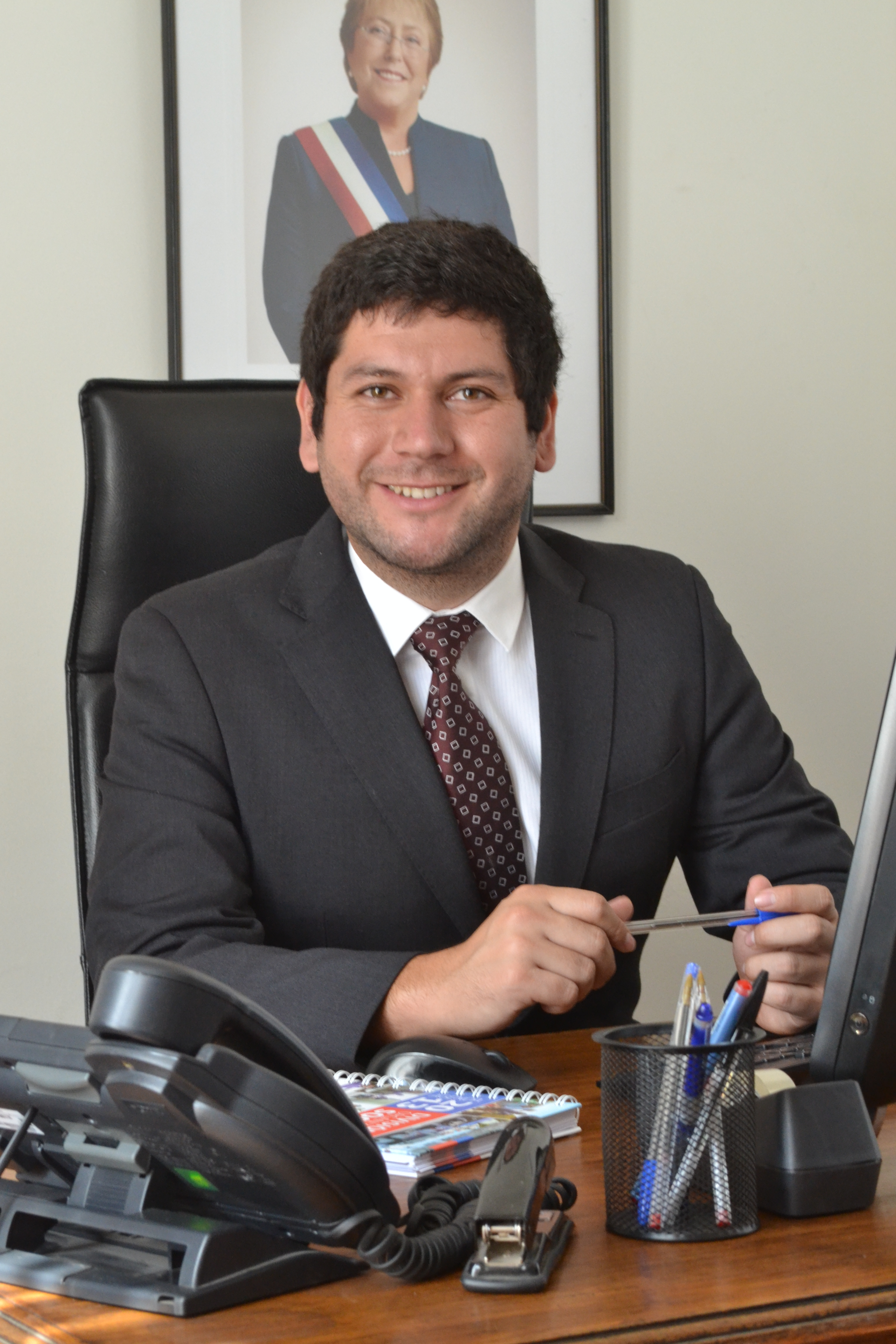
- Ballesteros as the Social Organizations' Division director

President of the University of Santiago Student Federation
- In office 2010–2011
- Preceded by: Pablo Moyano
- Succeeded by: Sebastián Donoso

Member of the Central Committee of the Communist Youth of Chile
- In office 2010–Present

Personal details
- Born: 23 June 1987 (age 39) Santiago, Chile
- Party: Communist Youth of Chile
- Education: University of Santiago, Chile

Camilo Igor Ballesteros Briones (born 23 June 1987 in Santiago) is a Chilean physical education undergraduate student and member of the Chilean Communist Youth. He was the president of the University of Santiago de Chile Student Federation (Feusach) in 2010-2011 and became of the main spokespersons of the Confederation of Chilean Students (Confech) during the movement for better access to quality education.

== Biography ==
Born to working-class parents, Ballesteros lived his childhood in the commune of Independencia, Santiago. He studied in the Saint George school (known for being an elite school for the rich people of Chile), and then in the Colegio Latinoamericano in Providencia. When he was in high school he took part in the 2006 student protests in Chile, joining the Communist Party of his country.

Inside the University of Santiago he started working with a group of students, including Feusach former president Pablo Moyano, to form a leftist student collective called Avanza Usach. They won University elections in the 2009–2010 term and were re-elected in 2010, with Ballesteros as president. During the 2011 student protests he became one of the three most recognized faces of the Confech along with Camila Vallejo from the Fech and Giorgio Jackson from the Feuc.

In January 2012, with the support of the Chilean Communist Party, Ballesteros launched his candidacy for mayor to Estación Central. In the elections he lost by a small percentage against Rodrigo Delgado (UDI). In January 2013 the Communist Party announced his candidacy for deputy.

In 2013, he took part in Michelle Bachelet's presidential campaign as representative of her Youth Branch.

Ballesteros is a Roman Catholic.

== See also ==
- Leaders of the 2011 Chilean protests
- 2011 student protests in Chile
