= Marisol Prado =

Chilean academic

President of the University of Chile Student Federation
- In office 1997–1998
- Preceded by: Rodrigo Roco
- Succeeded by: Ivan Mlynarz

Personal details
- Born: Marisol Rossana Prado Villegas; April 5, 1968 (age 58) Santiago, Chile
- Party: JJ.CC.
- Education: University of Chile
- Profession: Psychiatrist, Academic

Rossana Marisol Prado Villegas (b. Santiago, April 5, 1968), is a Chilean physician, psychiatrist and academic who became the first woman to hold the post of president of the University of Chile Student Federation (abbr. FECH) which was founded in 1906; she was the first and only woman until Camila Vallejo assumed the post in August 2010, followed by Scarlett Mac-Ginty in November 2011.

== Early life and education ==
Prado studied medicine at the University of Chile. She joined the Communist Youth of Chile in 1995. She served as communication and General Secretary of the FECH during the term of Rodrigo Roco and was elected as FECH president with approximately 40% of the votes in 1997. During her tenure and mandate as a principal student leader, Chile experienced one of the most important mass student mobilizations of the 1990s. These were in response to the privatization of tertiary education, which began to take form in March 1990 with the Ley Orgánica Constitucional de Enseñanza (Organic Constitutional Law on Teaching) - the last constitutional law enacted by Augusto Pinochet as head of state.

Prado, who is close to the Catholic Church, participated in the Continental Youth and Young Adult Gathering in 1998. She was one of the founders of the Nueva Izquierda Universitaria (New Left University Movement) – which created a renaissance in left-wing political activism at the University of Chile.

Prado completed post-doctoral studies in psychiatry and clinical psychology at the Autonomous University of Barcelona.

== Career ==
Prado is currently an assistant professor at the Faculty of Medicine of the University of Chile, where she also serves as Directora de Bienestar Estudiantil (Director of Student Welfare).

=== Municipal elections (Chile) 2000 ===
Municipal elections 2000 for the mayor/councillor of Santiago

Candidate	Party	Votes	%	Result
Joaquín Lavín Infante	UDI	73.088	60,99	Mayor
Marta Larraechea Bolívar	PDC	34.993	29,20	Councillor
Marisol Prado Villegas	ILB	2.207	1,84	
Tomás Hirsch Goldschmidt	PH	2.067	1,72	

== See also ==
- University of Chile Student Federation
- Education in Chile
- Communist Youth of Chile
- Communist Party of Chile
