= Leaders of the 2011 Chilean protests =

The 2011 Chilean protests over the education have been primarily led by the CONFECH, the student unions association of Chile's 25 traditional universities, and CONES the student union association of secondary students of Chile. The student union leaders of emblematic universities (e.g. University of Chile and Pontifical Catholic University of Chile) and schools (e.g. Instituto Nacional) account for most of the movements leadership at national level.

== University students' unions leaders ==
=== Giorgio Jackson ===
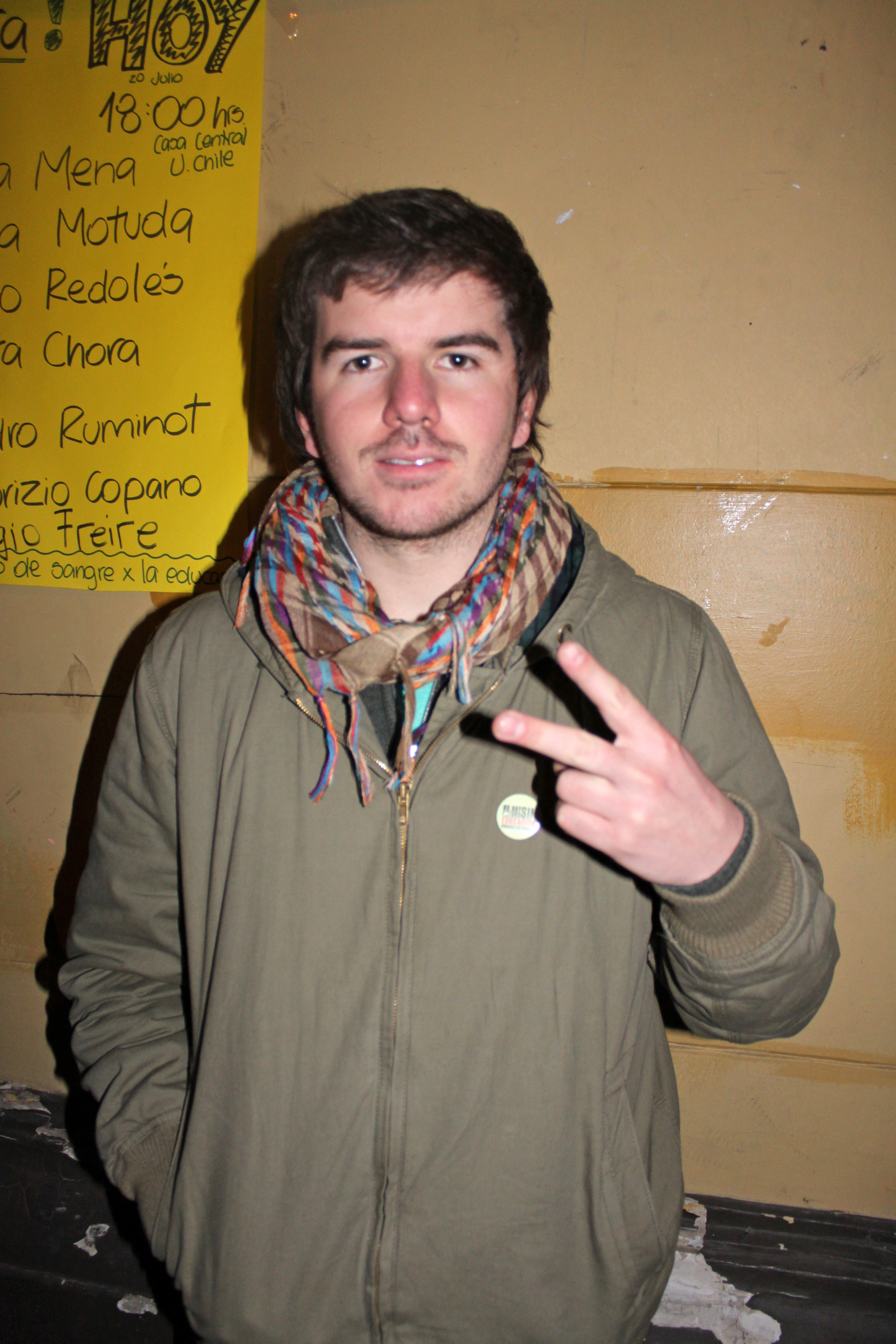
Giorgio Jackson

Kenneth Giorgio Jackson Drago (born Santiago, February 6, 1987) is the president of Federación de Estudiantes de la Universidad Católica de Chile (FEUC) and in that position one of the principal leaders of the 2011 student protests.

=== Camila Vallejo ===
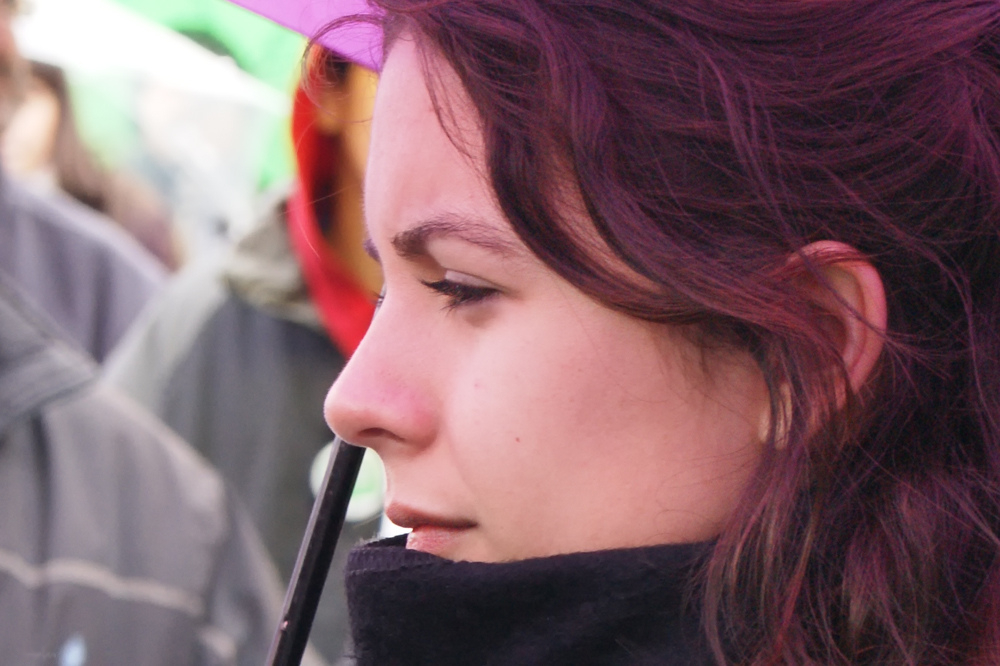
Camila Vallejo in Santiago de Chile, 2011

Camila Antonia Amaranta Vallejo Dowling (born in Santiago, April 28, 1988) is a geography student and a leader of the student movement in Chile. She is a member and activist of the Juventudes Comunistas de Chile (Communist Youth of Chile), and the current president of the Student Federation of the University of Chile, being the second woman to hold this post, after Marisol Prado (1997–1998).

Camila Vallejo is the daughter of Reinaldo Vallejo and Mariela Dowling, former members of Chilean Communist Party during the 1970s.

Vallejo lived her childhood between the communes of Macul and La Florida, and she studied in Colegio Raimapu, a mixed-private school in La Florida. In 2006, Vallejo entered the University of Chile to study geography, where she started forming ties with leftist students and getting involved in politics, which led her to join the Chilean Communist Youth the next year. She was counselor of the FECh in 2008. In November 2010 she was chosen as the president of the FECh.

She has acquired public attention as a leading spokesperson and leader of the 2011 student protests in Chile, alongside other student leaders: Giorgio Jackson from the Student Federation of the Catholic University of Chile and Camilo Ballesteros from the Student Federation of the University of Santiago de Chile.

In August 2011, the Supreme Court of Chile ordered police protection for Camila Vallejo because of the death threats she received.

== Secondary students' unions ==
=== Rodrigo Rivera ===
Leader of Federación de Estudiantes Secundarios de Copiapó (Copiapó Federation of High School Students - FESCO) and nacional spokesperson of the high school organization Cones (National Coordinator of High School Students).

=== Roberto Toledo ===
President of Federación de Estudiantes Secundarios de Concepción (Concepción Federation of High School Students - FESEC) and national spokesperson of the high school organization Cones (National Coordinator of High School Students).

== Indigenous student organizations ==
=== José Ancalao ===
José Ancalao (also spelled Ankalao) is a representative of the Mapuche Student Federation (Spanish: Federación Mapuche de Estudiantes or FEMAE) a nationwide student union for indigenous Mapuche students.

== See also ==
- Education in Chile
- 2011 Chilean protests
