= Wainer =

Wainer is a surname. Notable people with the surname include:

- Alejandro Rojas Wainer (1945–2018), Chilean-Canadian academic
- Bertram Wainer (1928–1987), Australian physician
- Cherry Wainer (1935–2014), South African musician
- Howard Wainer (born 1943), American statistician and writer
- Samuel Wainer (1910–1980), Brazilian journalist and writer
- Zoe Wainer, Australian doctor and public health executive, head of the Australian Centre for Disease Control

== See also ==
- Rachel Wainer Apter (born 1980/1981), New Jersey lawyer
- Wainer Lusoli (born 1974), Italian academic
