= Camila Vallejo =

Chilean communist politician and former student activist

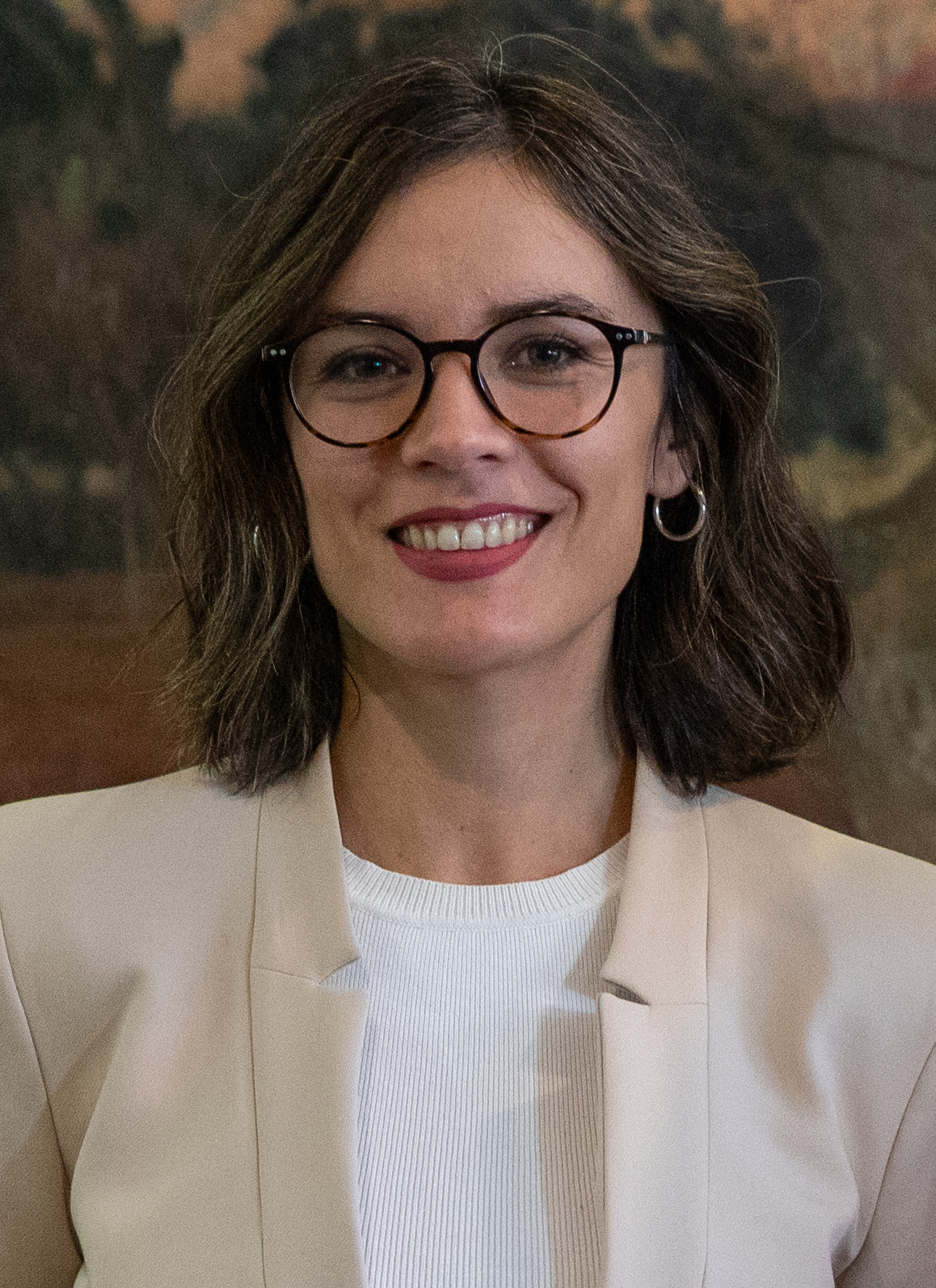
- Vallejo in 2024

Minister General Secretariat of Government
- In office 9 July 2025 – 11 March 2026
- President: Gabriel Boric
- Preceded by: Aisén Etcheverry
- Succeeded by: Mara Sedini
- In office 11 March 2022 – 23 December 2024
- President: Gabriel Boric
- Preceded by: Jaime Bellolio
- Succeeded by: Aisén Etcheverry (acting) (Note: On pre- and postnatal leave from December 2024 to July 2025.)

Member of the Chamber of Deputies of Chile
- In office 11 March 2018 – 11 March 2022
- Preceded by: District established
- Succeeded by: Daniela Serrano
- Constituency: District 12
- In office 11 March 2014 – 11 March 2018
- Preceded by: Carlos Montes Cisternas
- Succeeded by: District dissolved
- Constituency: District 26 of the Santiago Metropolitan Region

President of the University of Chile Student Federation
- In office 24 November 2010 – 16 November 2011
- Preceded by: Julio Sarmiento
- Succeeded by: Scarlett Mac-Ginty (acting); Gabriel Boric

Personal details
- Born: 28 April 1988 (age 38) Santiago, Chile
- Party: Communist
- Spouse: Abel Zicavo (m. 2023)
- Domestic partner: Julio Sarmiento (2011–2016)
- Children: 2
- Education: University of Chile
- Profession: Geographer

Camila Antonia Amaranta Vallejo Dowling (Spanish: [kaˈmila anˈtonja amaˈɾanta βaˈʝexo ˈðawlin]; born 28 April 1988) is a Chilean geographer, politician, and former student leader. A prominent member of the Communist Party of Chile, she served as the Minister General Secretariat of Government under President Gabriel Boric, a role held from March 2022 to March 2026. She previously served as a member of the Chamber of Deputies for District 26 (2014–2018) and later District 12 (2018–2022).

Vallejo rose to national prominence as a leading figure in the 2011 student protests, during which she served as president of the University of Chile Student Federation (FECh) and spokesperson for the Confederation of Chilean Students (Confech). Her role in the protests earned her international recognition, with The New York Times Magazine dubbing her "the world's most glamorous revolutionary". She is widely regarded as one of the most influential communist figures in 21st-century Chile and is often seen as the symbolic successor to the late communist leader Gladys Marín.

== Early life and education ==
Camila Vallejo was born in Santiago to Reinaldo Vallejo and Mariela Dowling, both committed members of the Communist Party of Chile and activists who opposed the military dictatorship of Augusto Pinochet. Her father worked as an actor and independently sold and installed heating appliances, while her mother was a homemaker. Vallejo has notable political ancestry; she is the great-great-grandniece of Marmaduke Grove Vallejo, a socialist military officer and politician, and the great-granddaughter of Jorge Dowling Desmadryl, who served as a deputy.

Raised in the communes of Macul and La Florida, where she still lives, Vallejo attended the private Colegio Raimapu in La Florida. She enrolled at the University of Chile in 2006 to study geography, graduating in July 2013 with a thesis titled Social Construction of Vulnerable Territories: The Social Geography of Risk in Concepción, Talcahuano, Hualpén and San Pedro de la Paz, which received the highest distinction. During her university years, she became involved in leftist politics and joined the Communist Youth of Chile in 2007. In 2021, she commenced a master's degree in government, public policy, and territories at the University Alberto Hurtado, which she put on hold upon her appointment as a minister in March 2022.

== Student activism and rise to prominence ==
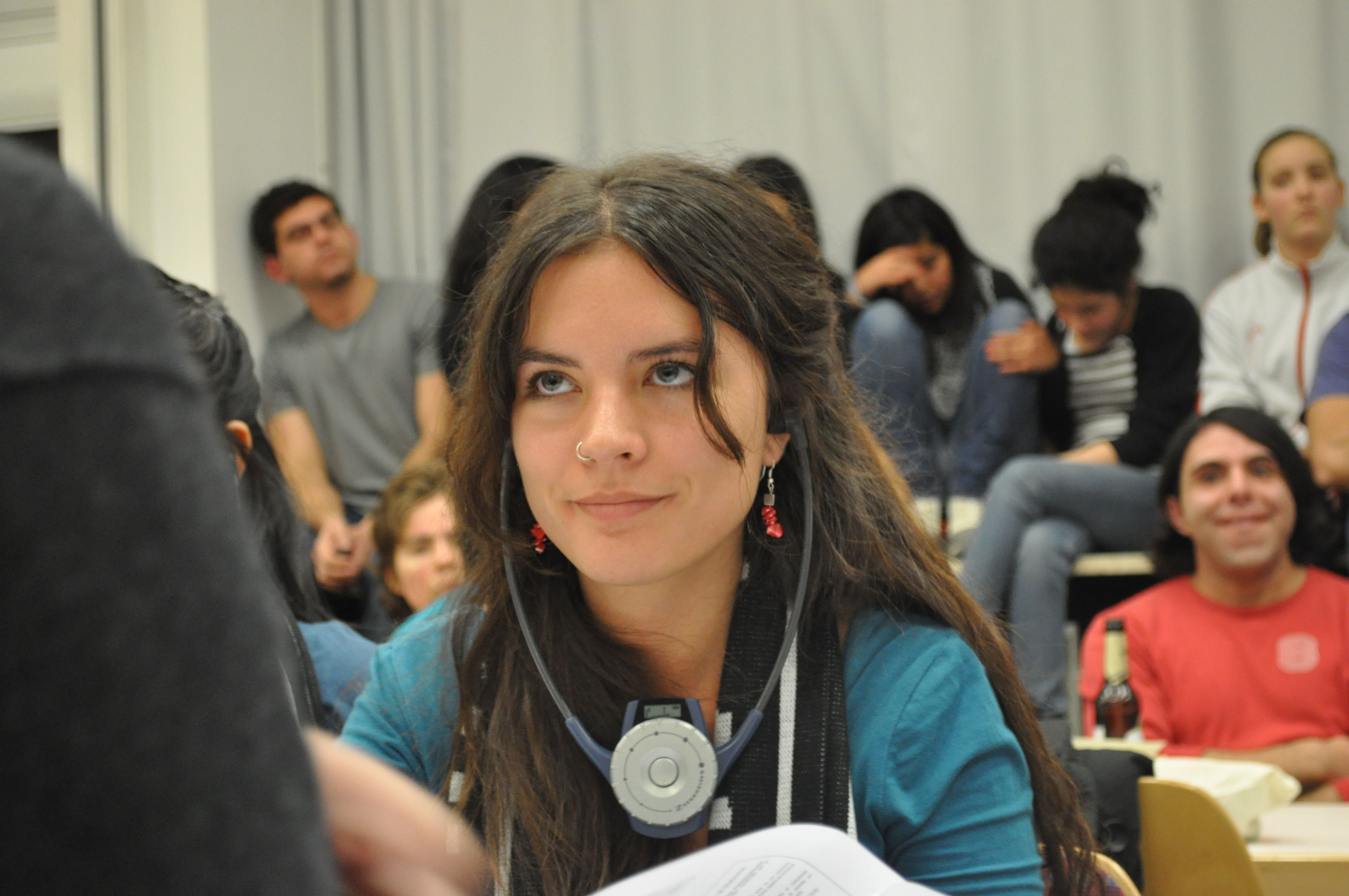
Vallejo as a student leader in 2012

Vallejo's political career began in student governance. She served as a counselor for the University of Chile Student Federation (FECh) in 2008 and as vice-president of the Geography Student Center. In November 2010, she was elected president of the FECh, becoming only the second woman to lead the 105-year-old student union.

She emerged as a national figure and a leading spokesperson during the widespread 2011 student protests, which demanded profound reforms to Chile's education system. Alongside other leaders like Giorgio Jackson and Gabriel Boric, she became a face of the movement, articulating its critique of education as a commodity and advocating for its recognition as a social right. Her high profile also made her a target; in August 2011, the Supreme Court of Chile ordered police protection for her after she received death threats.

In December 2011, she lost her re-election bid for the FECh presidency to Gabriel Boric but, as the most-voted candidate on her list, assumed the vice-presidency until November 2012.

== Parliamentary career (2014–2022) ==
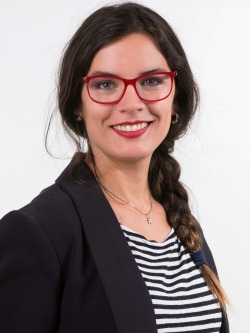
Official portrait as deputy (2018)

In November 2012, the Communist Party nominated Vallejo as a candidate for the Chamber of Deputies in the 2013 general election. Despite earlier reservations about campaigning for Michelle Bachelet, she later supported the Socialist candidate after the Communist Party aligned with her coalition.

She was elected in a landslide, representing District 26 of La Florida with over 43% of the vote, becoming the youngest member of parliament. She was part of a group of former student leaders in Congress, known as the "student bench" (bancada estudiantil), which included Boric, Jackson, and Karol Cariola, and was instrumental in debates on educational reform.

During her first term, she served on the permanent commissions for Environment and Natural Resources; Science and Technology; and Education, later becoming president of the Education Commission in March 2015.

In 2016, she was implicated in a scandal involving plagiarized parliamentary advisory reports paid to a Communist Party think tank. Vallejo condemned the lack of rigor, terminated the contract, and became the only parliamentarian to commit to repaying the funds, stating she felt "betrayed" and would take responsibility.

Vallejo has been vocal in her criticism of Israel, which she has described as "a terrorist State that seeks the displacement and extermination of Palestinians," framing the conflict as a "genocide" rather than a war.

She was re-elected in the 2017 general election for the new District 12. As a deputy, she focused on education, gender equality, and was a key proponent of legislation to reduce the working week to 40 hours.

During the 2021 presidential election, Vallejo initially served as a spokesperson for Communist Party nominee Daniel Jadue in the primary race. After Jadue lost the primary to Gabriel Boric, she became a key figure in Boric's successful general election campaign. In August 2021, she announced she would not seek a third term as deputy.

== Minister of Government (2022–2026) ==
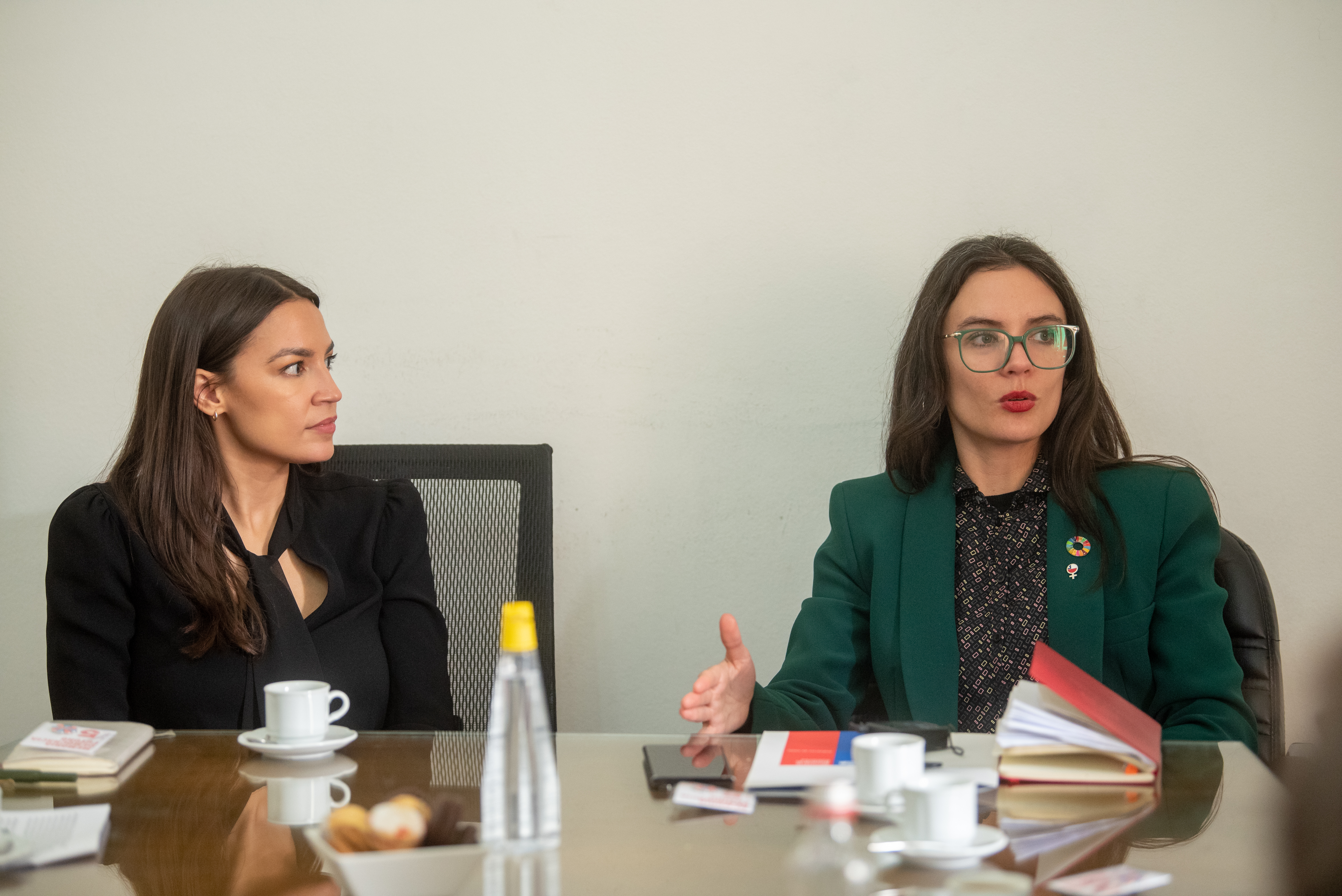
Vallejo with Alexandria Ocasio-Cortez during a meeting with US Democratic members of Congress

Following Gabriel Boric's election victory, Vallejo was appointed Minister General Secretariat of Government in January 2022, becoming the official spokesperson for his administration and the first member of the Communist Party to hold this portfolio. She assumed office on 11 March 2022.

As government spokeswoman, she has been a staunch defender of the administration's agenda, including its social recovery plans, pension reform, tax reform, and security policies. She campaigned for the approval of a new progressive constitution in the 2022 referendum, though the proposal was rejected by voters.

In August 2023, she met with a visiting delegation of U.S. Democratic congressmembers, including Alexandria Ocasio-Cortez, and joined calls for the U.S. government to apologize for its role in the 1973 coup that brought General Pinochet to power.

Her tenure has involved navigating internal coalition tensions and opposition criticism. In 2024, she publicly criticized companies Enel and Huachipato, stating that "some companies have left much to be desired" in terms of their social and environmental responsibility.

== Prenatal leave and return ==
In August 2024, Vallejo announced her second pregnancy. She began her prenatal leave on 30 December 2024, with her duties subrogated to the Minister of Science, Aisén Etcheverry. She gave birth to a son in February 2025 and returned to her role as government spokesperson on 2 July 2025.

== Political profile and public image ==
Vallejo identifies as an atheist. She is frequently described in the media as the most significant Communist personality in 21st-century Chile and a symbolic successor to Gladys Marín.

Her prominence during the 2011 protests garnered international media attention. She was featured on the cover of the German weekly Die Zeit, and was voted "Person of the Year" in a 2011 readers' poll by The Guardian. She was included in Time magazine's "100 People Who Mattered" list in 2011 and Newsweek's "150 Fearless Women" in 2012. In 2012, a collection of her writings, Podemos Cambiar el Mundo ("We Can Change the World"), was published.

Not all assessments have been positive. Historian Gabriel Salazar controversially suggested she should leave the Communist Party if she were "intelligent enough" and referred to her as the new caudillo of the party.

== Personal life ==
In April 2013, Vallejo announced she was expecting her first child with Julio Sarmiento, a fellow Communist Youth leader and her partner since 2011. Their daughter was born on 6 October 2013.

Vallejo and Sarmiento separated in 2016. She later began a relationship with musician Abel Zicavo, whom she married in 2023. In August 2024, the couple announced they were expecting their second child, a son, who was born on 5 February 2025.

== Published works ==
- Vallejo, Camila. Podemos cambiar el mundo. 2012. ISBN 9781921700477.

== In popular culture ==
In 2013, the American punk band Desaparecidos, fronted by Conor Oberst, released the song "Te amo Camilla Vallejo" in tribute to her role in the student movement. The track was included on their 2015 album Payola.

== Awards and recognition ==
- Person of the Year by readers of The Guardian, 2011.
- World Student Leader in the Defense of Human Rights 2011 by Amnesty International, Norway, March 2012.
- Letelier-Moffitt Human Rights Award by the Institute for Policy Studies, United States, October 2012 (awarded to the Confederation of Chilean Students).
- Honorary member of the Universidad Nacional de La Plata, Argentina, June 2013.
- Named one of the 10 people of the year by Agence France-Presse (AFP), December 2013.
- Ranked among the top 20 international young leaders in politics by the British think tank Apolitical, December 2018.
- Recognized among the "100 Women Leaders" of Chile by Mujeres Empresarias and El Mercurio, November 2022.
- Featured in the 2022 list of 30 powerful women nationally by Forbes Chile.

== See also ==
- Leaders of the 2011 Chilean protests
- 2011–2013 Chilean student protests
- Education in Chile
- Communist Youth of Chile
