= Alejandro Rojas Wainer =

Chilean-Canadian academic (1945–2018)

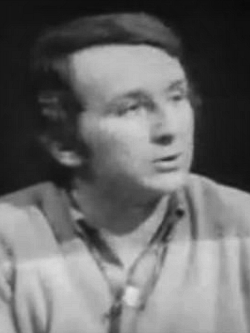

Member of the Chamber of Deputies of Chile
- In office 15 May 1973 – 11 September 1973
- Succeeded by: National Congress dissolved
- Constituency: 7th Provincial Group

Presidnent of the University of Chile Student Federation
- In office 1970–1973
- Preceded by: Jaime Ravinet
- Succeeded by: Yerko Ljubetic

Personal details
- Born: 31 January 1945 Santiago, Chile
- Died: 16 April 2018 (aged 73) Vancouver, Canada
- Party: Communist Party (PC)
- Spouse: Elena Orrego
- Education: University of Chile
- Occupation: Politician
- Profession: Biologist

Alejandro Rojas Wainer (31 January 1945 – 16 April 2018) was a Chilean-Canadian academic. He was elected to the Chamber of Deputies of Chile for Popular Unity in 1973, but left office after the coup d'état. Subsequently, he moved to Canada, and taught at the University of British Columbia.

== Biography ==
Rojas Wainer was born in Santiago on 31 January 1945. He attended the Manuel de Salas Experimental School affiliated with the University of Chile. Upon graduation, he was accepted into the University of Chile Dental School. Rojas Wainer became the first person elected to three terms as leader the University of Chile Student Federation, serving between from 1970 to 1973.

While in college, he was active with the Communist Youth of Chile. Rojas Wainer was elected to the Chamber of Deputies for the Popular Unity political coalition in 1973, while still president of the student federation. After the coup d'état forced Salvador Allende out of power, Rojas Wainer left Chile to pursue graduate studies at the University of Geneva and York University.

He remained in Canada, teaching at the University of British Columbia. Rojas Wainer died of cancer at the age of 73 on 16 April 2018 in Vancouver.
