= Political positions of Sebastián Piñera =

Chilean president Sebastián Piñera declared his position on many political issues through his public comments and legislative record. While he belonged to the right-wing party Renovación Nacional, Piñera himself said he was "almost" a Christian Democrat.

== Social issues ==
=== Abortion ===
Piñera supports Chile's abortion laws, which outlaw the practice in all circumstances. In 2013, he praised as "brave and mature" a pregnant 11-year-old rape victim who said she was happy to have the child.

In 2018, Piñera promised to oppose efforts to expand abortion in the country, saying he will do “everything that is necessary to defend life.”.

=== LGBT issues ===
In June 2021, Piñera said he will expedite a bill legalising same-sex marriage which had stalled in the National Congress of Chile, saying "I think the time for equal marriage has come in our country", and "all people, regardless of their sexual orientation, will be able to live, love and form a family with all the protection and dignity they need and deserve".

== Education ==
With respect to the massive 2011–2012 Chilean student protests, Piñera defended for-profit activity in education and proposed to legalize it, rejecting the students' demands for the public ownership of educational establishments. Piñera considers education a consumer good.

== Foreign policy ==
As president, Piñera expressed support for the Argentine claim on the Falkland Islands, as "the unrenounceable rights of Argentina on the islands."

After the death of Hugo Chávez, the left-wing president of Venezuela, it was known that on 4 May 2010, during a Unasur summit, Piñera agreed with him a verbal and previously unreleased personal non-aggression pact.

== Pinochet's dictatorship ==
Piñera has declared he voted No in the 1988 plebiscite on whether Augusto Pinochet should stay on power until 1997. In 1998, Piñera opposed the arrest and detention of Pinochet in London, initiated by Baltasar Garzón, arguing that it was an attack on the sovereignty and dignity of Chile.
