= Ricardo Solari =

Chilean minister

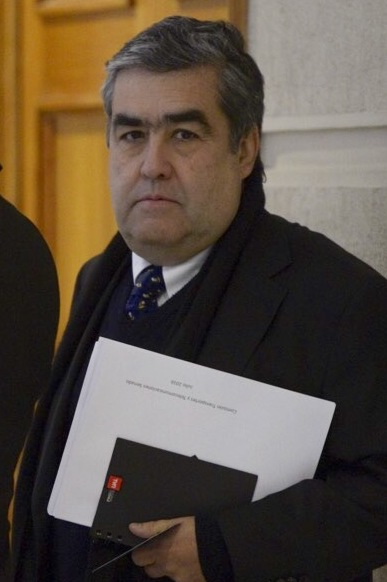

President of Televisión Nacional de Chile
- In office 11 March 2014 – 11 March 2018
- President: Michelle Bachelet
- Preceded by: Mikel Uriarte
- Succeeded by: Francisco Orrego Bauzá

Minister of Labor and Social Provision
- In office 11 March 2000 – 22 April 2005
- President: Ricardo Lagos
- Preceded by: Germán Molina Valdivieso
- Succeeded by: Yerko Ljubetic

General Undercretariat of Government
- In office 11 March 1990 – 11 March 1994
- President: Patricio Aylwin
- Preceded by: Creation of the position
- Succeeded by: Ángel Flisflisch

Personal details
- Born: 1 October 1954 (age 72) Santiago, Chile
- Party: Partido de Izquierda Amplia Socialista (PAIS) (1988−1990); Socialist Party (1990−present)
- Spouse: Milena Vodanovic
- Children: Three
- Education: University of Chile (BA)
- Occupation: Politician
- Profession: Economist

Ricardo Alejandro Solari Saavedra (born 1 October 1954) is a Chilean economist and politician who served as leader during the governments of Patricio Aylwin (1990−1994), Ricardo Lagos (2000–2006) and Michelle Bachelet (2014−2018).

== Biography ==
=== Early life ===
A member of the Socialist Party (PS) since he was 15, his first political position was as leader of the Federation of Secondary Students of Santiago (FESES), the organization of secondary students, from 1971 to 1972. Solari was a member of the Central Committee of the PS since 1976, holding the vice presidency from 1994 to 2000. He actively participated in the No campaign as well as in the 1990 presidential election of the Christian-democratic candidate Patricio Aylwin (DC), who resulted elected.

In early 1990, Solari was appointed undersecretary of the Ministry General Secretariat of the Presidency, holding the position until 1994. During the Government of the also DC, Eduardo Frei Ruiz-Tagle, Solari was director of the Banco Estado.

=== Rising ===
In March 2000, Solari became Minister of Labor and Social Welfare of President Ricardo Lagos. During his administration, he managed to carry out two emblematic bills for the Government: the Labor Reform, and the Unemployment Insurance. Similarly, Solari also had to face poor results in the creation of new jobs, maintaining high unemployment although decreasing.

In April 2005, he presented his resignation from the portfolio to join the presidential command of Michelle Bachelet, whom he had known since his youth. Solari was one of the key figures in the first round, but Bachelet's poor result (45.96%), the lowest presidential vote of the Concertación in a presidential election until then) relegated him to a secondary level in the second round. His role was mainly occupied by the Christian-democratic Andrés Zaldívar and Sergio Bitar, from the Party for Democracy.

In August 2007, he was invited to join the Presidential Advisory Council for Labor and Equity created during the Bachelet's first government. The goal of this entity was to present proposals to the Executive power to promote the development of the Chilean labor world in a more equitable manner.

=== Consultant and president of TVN ===
In late 2008, Solari was appointed as the new electoral chief of the PS as vice president of the party.

In April 2010, he was summoned by the government of President Sebastián Piñera to join the presidential commission on Women, Work, and Motherhood.

From then on, Solari was a regular columnist for Capital magazine and La Segunda newspaper. In addition, he collaborated with the Center for Public Studies (CEP) and has served as a consultant for ECLAC and the Inter-American Development Bank (IDB) on issues of public policies.

In 2014, within the framework of Bachelet's second government, he was appointed president of the board of directors of Televisión Nacional de Chile (TVN).
