= Yerko Ljubetic =

Chilean politician

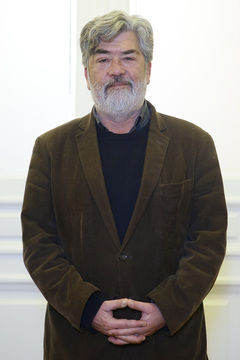

Member of the Constitutional Council
- In office 7 June 2023 – 7 November 2023

Minister of Labor and Social Provision
- In office 22 April 2005 – 11 March 2006
- President: Ricardo Lagos
- Preceded by: Ricardo Solari
- Succeeded by: Osvaldo Andrade

Undersecretary of Labor
- In office 11 March 2000 – 22 April 2005
- President: Ricardo Lagos
- Preceded by: Julio Valladares
- Succeeded by: Cristóbal Pascal

President of the University of Chile Student Federation
- In office 1984–1985
- Preceded by: Dissolution of the federation
- Succeeded by: Humberto Burotto

Personal details
- Born: 22 August 1960 (age 66) Vallenar, Chile
- Party: Christian Democratic Party (1984–2013); Social Convergence (2019–present)
- Other political affiliations: Autonomous Left (2013–2016); Autonomist Movement (2016–2018)
- Spouse: Silvia Godoy
- Children: One
- Education: University of Chile (LL.B)
- Occupation: Politician
- Profession: Lawyer

Yerko Antonio Ljubetic Godoy (born 20 August 1960) is a Chilean lawyer and politician. He served as the Minister of Labor from 2005 to 2006 during the presidency of Ricardo Lagos. Previously, he held the position of Undersecretary of Labor of Chile from 2000 to 2005. In 2023, he was a member of the Constitutional Council entrusted with the task of drafting a new constitution.

Ljubetic graduated from Colegio Seminario Pontificio Menor and later attended the Faculty of Law at the University of Chile. In 1984, he became the president of the university's student federation, leading protests against the military dictatorship of General Augusto Pinochet.

== Personal life ==
Born in Vallenar, Ljubetic is the son of Jerónimo Vladimir Ljubetic Vargas and Silvia Alicia Godoy Mueller, a lawyer.

He has been married to María Cecilia Grez Jordan, a psychologist, since 1992, and they have a daughter named Carla, who is also a psychologist and was the vice president of FEUC, the student federation at the Pontifical Catholic University of Chile, in 2016.

== Political career ==
As a member of the Christian Democratic Party (PDC), Ljubetic coordinated the Youth Movement for the "No" campaign in the 1988 plebiscite. He later participated in the campaign of fellow PDC member Patricio Aylwin for the presidency.

Ljubetic worked as a legal advisor for the Teachers' Association and the Central Workers' Union (1988–1990), as a lawyer for the Center for Research and Trade Union Consultancy (1991–1994), as head of the Department of Trade Union Organizations at the Labor Directorate (1994–1995), and as head of the Inspection Department at the Labor Directorate (1996–2000). He became the Undersecretary of Labor in 2000.

After the resignation of the Minister of Labor and Social Security, Ricardo Solari, to support the presidential campaign of socialist Michelle Bachelet in 2005, Ljubetic was appointed Minister by President Ricardo Lagos. He assumed office on 25 April 2005, and left the government along with Lagos on 11 March 2006.

Ljubetic then became the director of the ProyectAmérica Corporation and, at the request of Bachelet, became a member of the Commission for Social Equity.

In December 2009, Ljubetic lost the Congressional election to represent District 31 in the Chamber of Deputies.

Ljubetic resigned from the Christian Democratic Party in November 2013 to support the candidacy of former student leader Francisco Figueroa, from the Autonomous Left, for deputy of the Ñuñoa-Providencia district. After the dissolution of that organization, he joined the Autonomist Movement, which later merged into the Social Convergence party. Ljubetic served as the president of its Supreme Court from 2020 to 2022.

Currently, Ljubetic is teaching Labor Law at the Central University of Chile. Additionally, he is a member of the Constitutional Council entrusted with the task of drafting a new constitution, after winning a seat in the May 2023 election.
