= Wainer Lusoli =

Italian political scientist (born 1974)

- Born: March 1, 1974 (age 52); Sassuolo, Modena, Italy
- Occupations: Policy Officer, European Commission
- Website: be.linkedin.com/in/lusoli

Wainer Lusoli (born March 1, 1974) is an Italian academic, trained as a political scientist and policy analyst. He has worked on policy areas including science policy, open science, science in society, political participation, electronic democracy, digital identity, social computing and cloud computing.

From 2012 he has been a policy officer at the European Commission, DG Research and Innovation, working on the European Open Science Cloud and on Responsible Research and Innovation. From 2008 until 2012 he was a Scientific Officer and Senior Scientist at the Joint Research Centre (European Commission), Institute for Prospective Technological Studies and an honorary visiting research fellow at the University of Chester. Previously, he was a senior lecturer at the University of Chester and a research fellow at the University of Salford and at the London School of Economics and Political Science.

== Early life and education ==
Born in Sassuolo, Italy, Lusoli grew up in Fiorano Modenese, Italy. He earned a Laurea in Political Science from the University of Bologna, a Master's degree in European Political Systems and Cultures from the University of Bologna and the Network Europaeum, and a PhD from the London School of Economics and Political Science. His thesis, dated 2006, was titled Voice and e-quality: The state of electronic democracy in Britain.

== Career in academia ==
On aggregate, Lusoli has an h-index score of 20, and a g-index score of 27. His publications fall mainly in the areas of policy studies, e-government, electronic democracy and digital identity.

Between 1999 and 2006, Lusoli published extensively in peer-reviewed journals on topics related to electronic democracy and e-participation. Especially, he contributed to literature the use of web services by political parties, by political party members, by political representatives, by trade unions, by various political organisations, and by citizens in several countries. In his overall work on electronic democracy, he arrives at the sobering conclusion that electronic media may have little to offer in terms of democratic engagement.

In relation to Internet and politics, he worked on several research projects funded by the Economic and Social Research Council and other funding bodies, mainly in collaboration with Rachel K. Gibson and Stephen J. Ward. These include the ‘Virtual Observatory for Online Networks: New Forms of Collective Action on the WWW’ (July 2006 – July 2008); DEMO-net: The eParticipation Network, as affiliated expert (December 2006 – December 2008); ESRC - The Internet in the 2005 general election (March 2005 – December 2005); the Internet & Elections Project (March 2004 – June 2006), on the use of the new media by parties, candidates, pressure groups and the media during electoral campaigns in Europe, Asia and America; the ESRC Representation in the Internet Age project (July 2003 – June 2005), about the import of new media for representative democracy in Britain and Australia; and the ESRC Democracy and Participation Programme: The Internet, political organisations and participation project (August 2001 – June 2003), about the use of new media by British political organisation and citizens.

From 2007 to 2012, he contributed to the policy debate and to the academic literature on digital identity. He has researched digital natives's attitudes and behaviours regarding personal identity data disclosure; he has written on the policy and regulatory aspects of digital identity in Europe; he has written on the economics of identity markets. He has conducted research on the market and the economics of electronic identity, the changing infrastructural landscape, the structure of service provision based on digital identity and relevant policy issues in relation to the Digital Agenda for Europe. In this study and in related work, he and his co-authors argue that usability, minimum disclosure and portability, which are essential features of future digital identity systems, are at the margin of the market and that cross-country/cross-sector systems for business and public services are only in their infancy. And that in economic terms, the utility functions of users and service providers in relation to digital identity data are divergent. This generates a market asymmetry, as service providers are able to extract value from user data via opaque value propositions. From 2008, he has contributed to the debate on social computing and identity, mainly arguing that the way personal identity data is monetised in the digital market in unclear and unregulated, both in Europe and elsewhere.

== Conferences, public speaking and the media ==
Lusoli was relatively active in public fora and academic conferences for about a decade, presenting his work to academics and policy-makers in several countries. He is not a public figure, as his work has not received broadcast media attention, exception made for a few references in the British press in relation to academic-related work.

== See also ==
- digital identity
- electronic democracy
