= Communist Youth of Chile =

Political party in Chile

Communist Youth of Chile Juventudes Comunistas de Chile
- President: Catalina Lufín
- Founded: September 5, 1932
- Headquarters: Pasaje Reñaca 16, Piso 3, Oficina 1, Santiago
- Membership: 5,300 (15 years ago)
- Ideology: Communism; Marxism-Leninism
- Mother party: Communist Party of Chile
- International affiliation: World Federation of Democratic Youth

The Communist Youth of Chile (Spanish: Juventudes Comunistas de Chile, JJ.CC. / La Jota) is the youth wing of the Communist Party of Chile. It was founded on September 5, 1932, and it incorporates young communist activists between the ages of 14 and 28. The JJ.CC has political representation at the local and national level and its members have played a prominent role in the student organizations in Chile. The youth wing of the communist party in 2011 had 5,300 members.

== Principles ==
The Communist Youth of Chile (JJ.CC.) state that they constitute a diverse group of young people, that have acknowledge that to effectuate social change there is a fundamental need to organize politically. They state that there are urgent problems in Chilean society that will not be solved by the isolated acts of individuals; that therefore, they have chosen to give up part of their individual autonomy in order to be part of a collective and great movement.

The Communist Youth of Chile is a broad youth political organization which is composed of people from all walks of life: blue-collar workers, indigenous people, professionals, intellectuals, students, athletes and artists. It forms the youth wing of the Communist Party of Chile which applies and develops its political programme and movement among Chilean youth. It claims to struggle for the sovereignty, the political, economic, social and cultural liberation of the Chilean people; for democracy in its broadest possible expression.

The political programme of the JJ.CC. is based on the materialist conception of history and scientific socialism developed by Karl Marx, Friedrich Engels, V. I. Lenin and Luis Emilio Recabarren among other Marxist and progressive thinkers from Chile, Latin America and the world.

The JJ.CC. is organized to contribute, from various areas, to a fundamental change to society – to the political system and the economic model in Chile. From minor areas that strengthen the organizations, such as the plight for the welfare of students, for the improvement of the living condition of workers and residents from the marginalized areas of society, to those that enable the communist youth to contend political power.

== Notable members (past and present) ==
- Alejandro Rojas Wainer, academic, expert in climate change and sustainable agriculture.
- Camila Vallejo, student and vice president of the Student Federation of the University of Chile.
- Francisco Coloane, novelist.
- Gladys Marin, former president and secretary of the Communist Party of Chile.
- Julieta Campusano, Chilean senator.
- Karol Cariola, current general secretary of the Communist Youth of Chile.
- Luis Corvalán, educator, secretary and president of the Communist Party of Chile.
- María Jesús Sanhueza, penguin revolution 2006 leader/spokesperson.
- Marisol Prado, former president of the Student Federation of the University of Chile.
- Pablo Neruda, poet and nobel laureate.
- Rodolfo Parada, composer, musician.
- Sergio Ortega, composer and pianist.
- Sola Sierra, human rights activist.
- Víctor Jara, theatre director, poet and singer-songwriter.
- Violeta Parra, singer, poet, ethnomusicologist and visual artist.
- Volodia Teitelboim, lawyer, writer.
- Lorena Delgado Varas,Swedish member of parlament, activist.
