= Confederation of Chilean Students =

Student organization in Chile

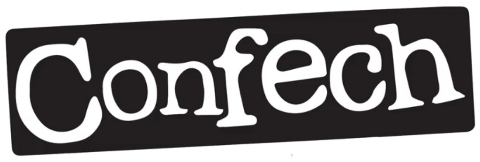
Official logo of CONFECH

The Confederation of Chilean Students (Spanish: Confederación de Estudiantes de Chile, CONFECH) is a student organization in Chile that congregates the student federations of universities in Chile.

It was established on October 23, 1984, in Valparaiso. In 2012, CONFECH called for a march on the streets of Santiago in response to a government commissions that seven Chilean universities had been pocketing profits; over 100,000 Chilean students participated in the march. CONFECH also organized student demonstrations against proposed government higher education reforms.

Former CONFECH leader Gabriel Boric became president of Chile in 2022.

== Structure ==
The CONFECH brings together students from the universities in Chile, which are organized in democratically elected federations. It is the only student organization with a national character and it has been in existence for over ten years.

== Member federations ==
The independent federations that form part of CONFECH include:

=== State universities ===
- Feut (Universidad de Tarapacá)
- Fedeunap (Universidad Arturo Prat)
- Feua (Universidad de Antofagasta)
- Feuda (Universidad de Atacama)
- Feuls (Universidad de La Serena)
- Feuv (Universidad de Valparaíso)
- Feupla (Universidad de Playa Ancha)
- FECH (Universidad de Chile)
- Feusach (Universidad de Santiago de Chile)
- Fep (Universidad Metropolitana de Ciencias de la Educación)
- Feutem (Universidad Tecnológica Metropolitana)
- Fedeut (Universidad de Talca)
- Feubb (Universidad del Bío-Bío)
- Feufro (Universidad de La Frontera)
- Feula (Universidad de Los Lagos)
- Feum (Universidad de Magallanes)

=== Private universities ===
- Feucn (Universidad Católica del Norte)
- Fepucv (Pontificia Universidad Católica de Valparaíso)
- Feutfsm (Universidad Técnica Federico Santa María)
- Feuc (Pontificia Universidad Católica de Chile)
- Feucen (Universidad Central de Chile)
- Feucm (Universidad Católica del Maule)
- Fec (Universidad de Concepción)
- Feucsc (Universidad Católica de la Santísima Concepción)
- Feuach (Universidad Austral de Chile)
- Feudd (Universidad del Desarrollo)
- Feuah (Universidad Alberto Hurtado)

=== Indigenous ===
- FEMAE (Mapuche Student Federation)

== See also ==
- Education in Chile
- 2011 Chilean protests
