= 2011–2013 Chilean student protests =

Student-led movement for restructuring education

2011–2013 Chilean protests
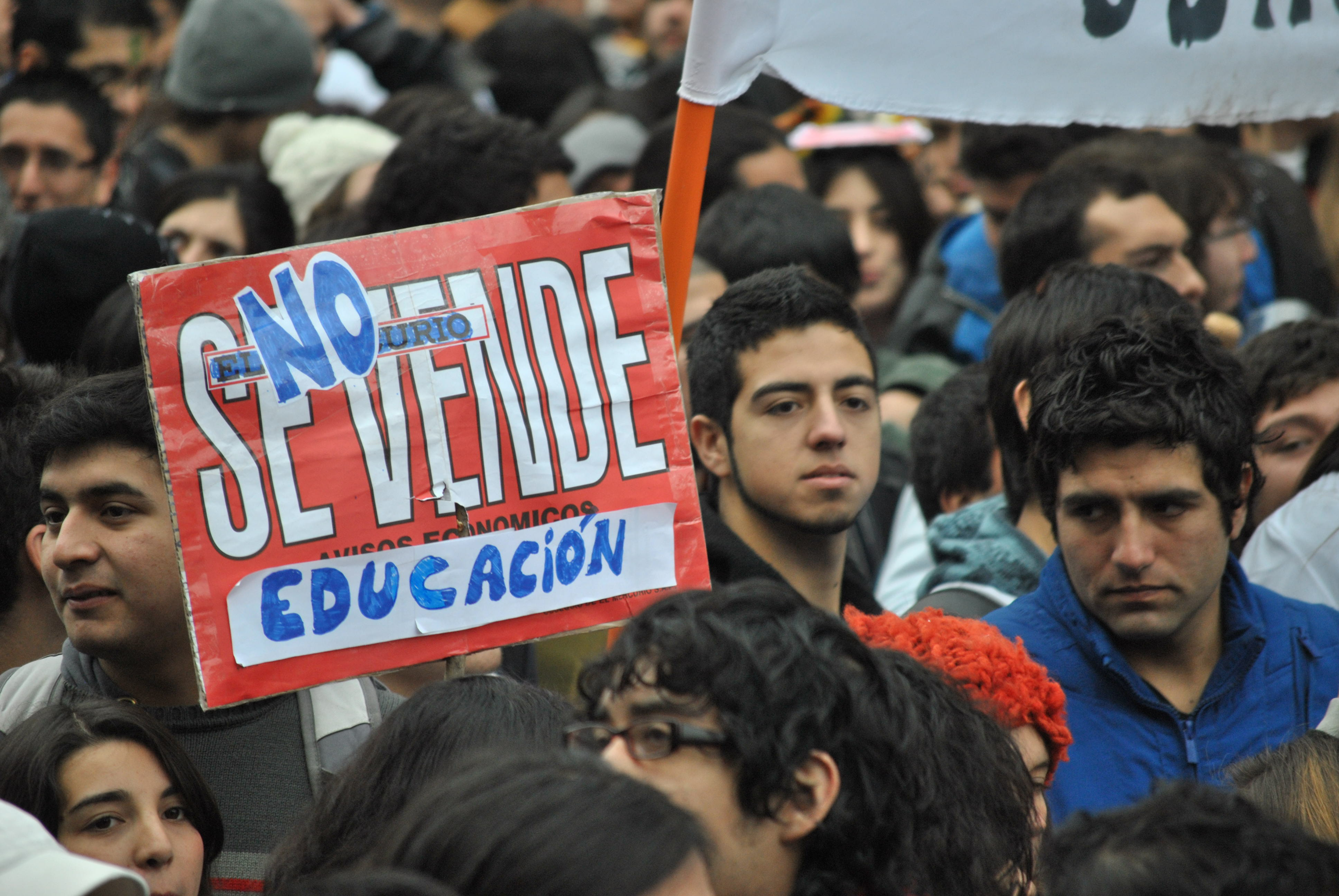
- Sign reading "Education is not for sale" during a Chilean student protest in June 2011
- Date: May 2011–2013
- Location: Chile
- Goals: The end of the Chilean school voucher system, its replacement by a public education system managed by the state. The end of for-profit education. Changes to tax code to better finance education.
- Methods: Demonstrations; Occupations; National strikes; Flash mobs; Online activism; Hunger strikes; Barricades
- Result: Protests quelled

Casualties
- Death: One student protester (Manuel Gutierrez Reinoso)
- Injuries: Several hundred protesters 500+ police officers
- Arrested: ~1800 students

The 2011–2013 Chilean protests – known as the Chilean Winter (in particular reference to the massive protests of August 2011) or the Chilean Education Conflict (as labelled in Chilean media) – were a series of student-led protests across Chile, demanding a new framework for education in the country, including more direct state participation in secondary education and an end to the existence of profit in higher education. Currently in Chile, only 45% of high school students study in traditional public schools and most universities are also private. No new public universities have been built since the end of the Chilean transition to democracy in 1990, even though the number of university students has increased.

Beyond the specific demands regarding education, there was a feeling that the protests reflected a "deep discontent" among some parts of society with Chile's high level of inequality. Protests included massive non-violent marches, but also a considerable amount of violence on the part of a side of protestors as well as riot police.

The first clear government response to the protests was a proposal for a new education fund and a cabinet shuffle which replaced Minister of Education Joaquín Lavín and was seen as not fundamentally addressing student movement concerns. Other government proposals were also rejected.

Student protestors did not achieve all their objectives, but they contributed to a dramatic fall in Sebastián Piñera's approval rating, which was measured at 26–30% in August 2011 polls by respected Chilean pollsters and had not increased by January 2012.

== Background ==
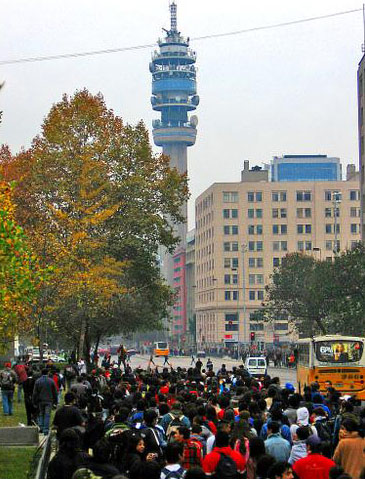
Protest march in Santiago during the 2006 Penguin Revolution

The onset of the 2011 Chilean protests have been attributed to several causes. The Economist explained the protests as being the result of "one of world’s lowest levels of public funding for higher education, some of the longest degrees and no comprehensive system of student grants or subsidized loans" and a flat job market as the detonant. Historian Gabriel Salazar describes the student conflict as being the continuation of a long strife between popular citizen movements and civic and military dictatorships. BBC have attributed "students' anger" to "a perception that Chile's education system is grossly unfair – that it gives rich students access to some of the best schooling in Latin America while dumping poor pupils in shabby, under-funded state schools."

Many newspapers and analysts have traced the protests back to the 2006 Penguin Revolution that occurred during the government of Michelle Bachelet, some claiming that these are the same secondary students who headed the 2006 movement that when in university are heading the 2011 student protests. Bachelet has defended the legacy of her government and said that in the aftermath of the Penguin Revolution the right-wing opposition prevented them from eliminating for-profit activity in education. Right-wing politician Cristián Monckeberg responded to this by saying that if Bachelet had solved the problem in 2006, the students would not be protesting now. On June 5 it was noted in the Chilean TV discussion show Tolerancia Cero that the Chilean students protests followed a cyclic pattern with major protests every 5 or 7 years.

Víctor Lobos, intendant of Biobío Region attributed the protests to the increasing number of children born outside matrimony claiming that this condition made them susceptible to "anarchism".

== Demands ==
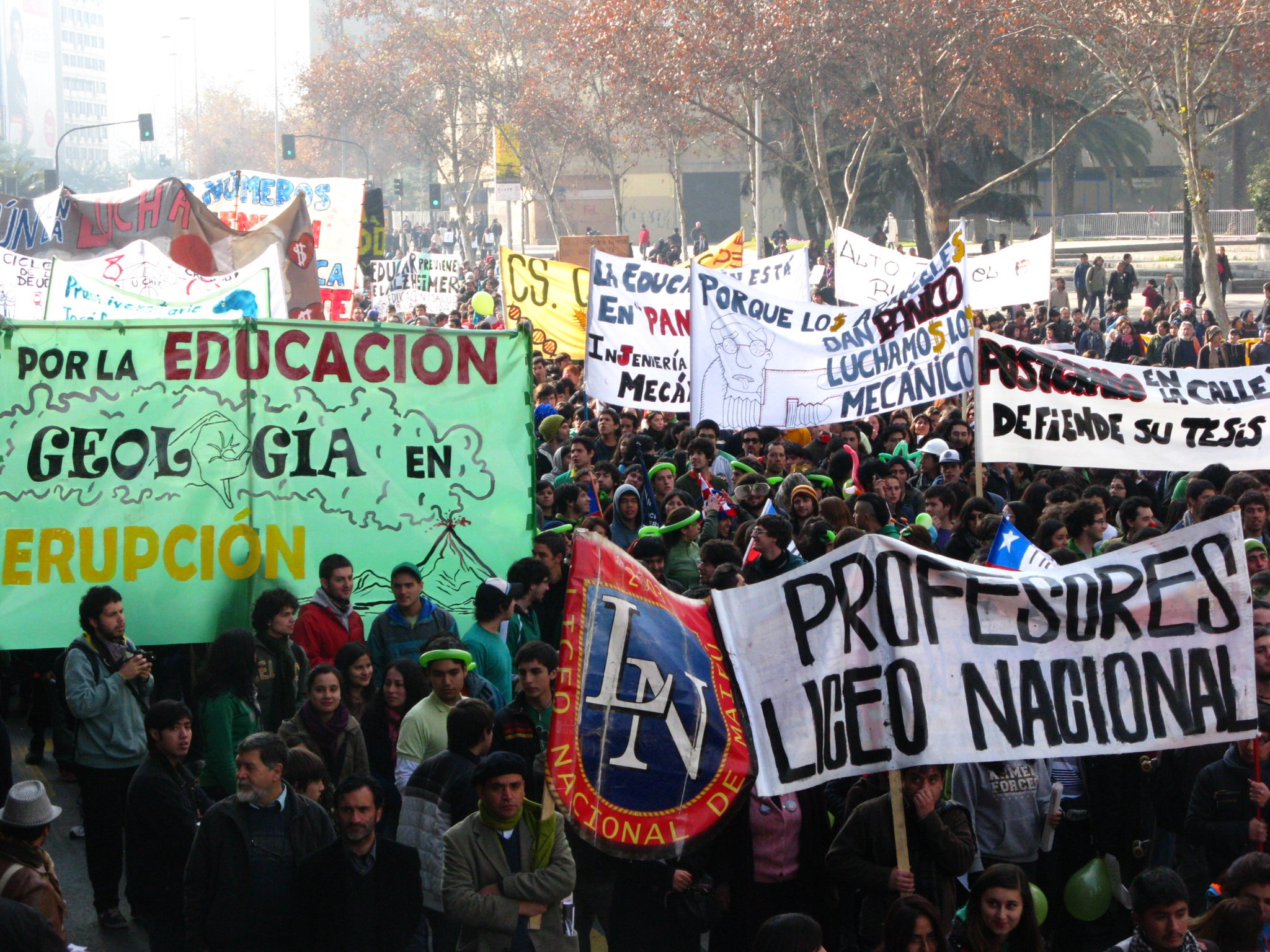
Protest march in Santiago, 14 July 2011

=== University students ===
University students are represented by CONFECH, the Confederation of Chilean Student Federations, a national body made up of student governments at Chilean universities and led by Camila Vallejo of the University of Chile and Giorgio Jackson of the Pontifical Catholic University of Chile. The CONFECH's proposal, known as the "Social Agreement for Chilean Education" (Acuerdo Social por la Educación Chilena), demands:

- Increased state support for public universities, which currently finance their activities mostly through tuition
- More equitable admissions process to prestigious universities, with less emphasis on the Prueba de Selección Universitaria standardized test
- Free public education, so access to higher education doesn't depend on families' economic situation.
- Creation of a government agency to apply the law against profit in higher education and prosecute those universities that are allegedly using loopholes to profit. The students oppose direct (fellowship and voucher) and indirect government aid (government-backed loans) to for-profit schools.
- A more serious accreditation process to improve quality and end indirect state support for poor quality institutions
- Creation of an "intercultural university" that meets the unique demands of Mapuche students
- Repeal of laws forbidding student participation in university governance

=== High school students ===
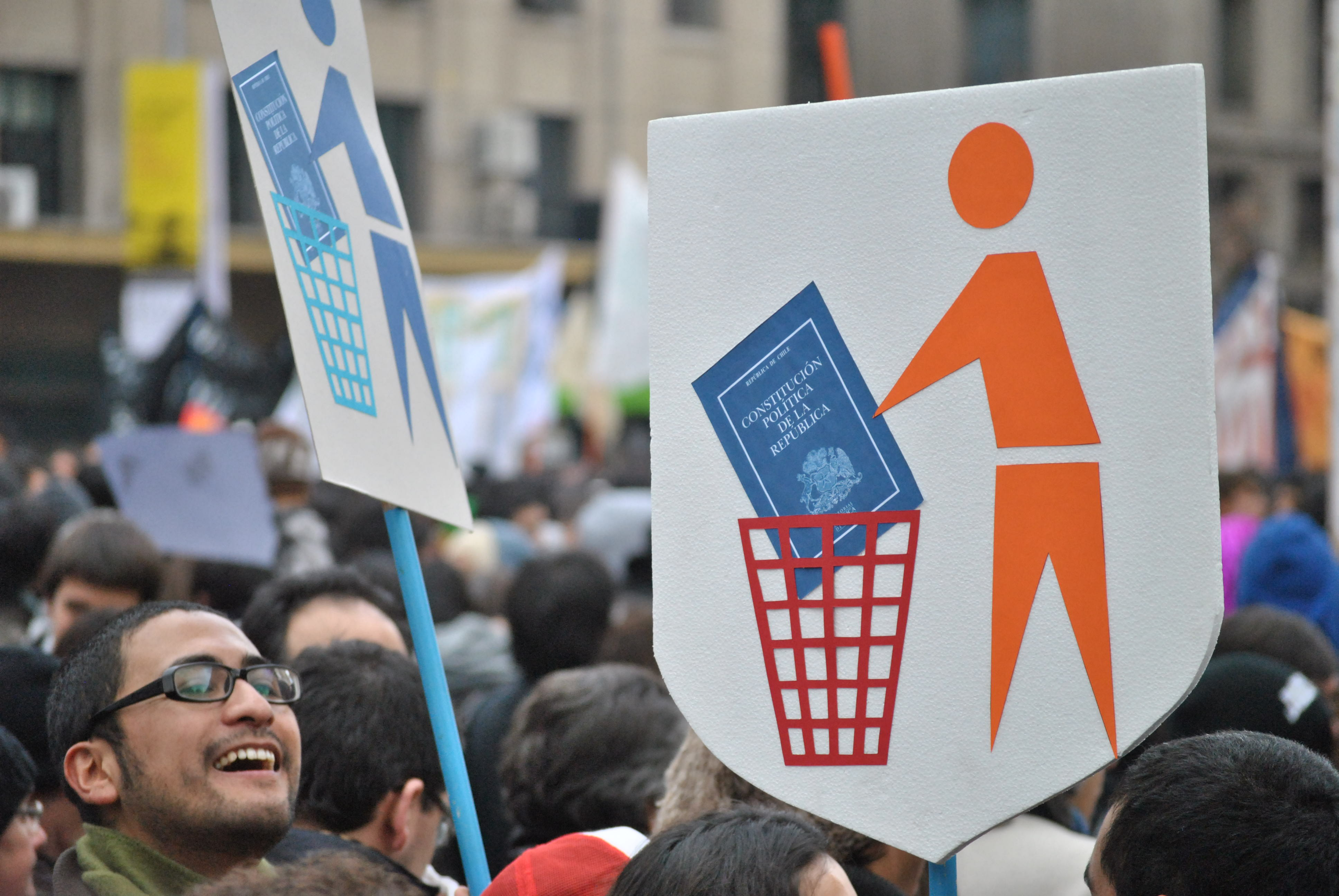
One of the most radical demands includes a profound reform of the current Constitution, approved in the controversial 1980 Plebiscite during the military dictatorship.

High school students are more loosely organized than the university students, with no national federation. However, their demands have also been included in CONFECH's proposal and include:

- Central government control over secondary and primary public schools, to replace the current system of municipal control which allegedly leads to inequalities
- The application of Chile's school voucher system in pre-school, primary and secondary levels be applicable only to nonprofit schools. The Chilean system, although defended by researchers linked to The Heritage Foundation, is criticized by researchers like Martin Carnoy, blaming it for the tremendous inequalities across all the Chilean educational system, measured by OECD's standards.
- Increases in state spending. Chile only spends 4.4% of GDP on education, compared to the 7% of GDP recommended by the UN for developed nations. Additionally, Chile ranks behind only Peru in educational segregation among the 65 countries that take the PISA test. Prominent Chilean education researcher Mario Waissbluth has called the Chilean system "educational apartheid"
- Use of student bus pass throughout the year
- Development of more vocational high schools
- Reconstruction of schools damaged during the 2010 Chilean earthquake
- Moratorium on the creation of new voucher/charter schools
- Higher pay for teachers and a national plan to attract the best talent to the profession and raise its social stature.

Additionally, some segments of the student movement have called for additional changes, such as a constitutional amendment guaranteeing quality education, an increase in the tax rate of higher earners (which is low in comparison to OECD countries), higher taxes for foreign extractors of or renationalization of Chile's copper resources.

== First wave of protests ==
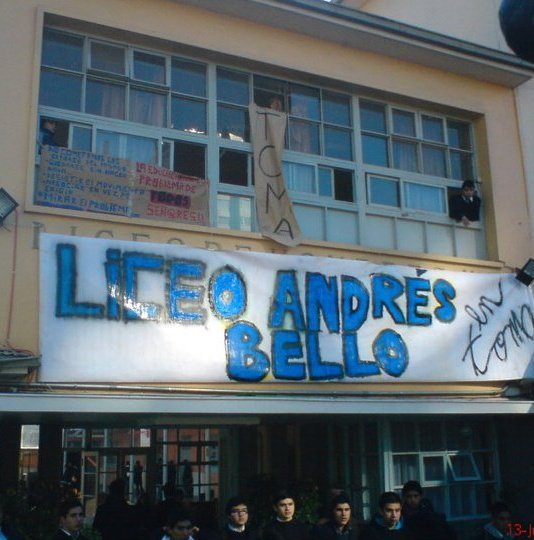
Liceo Andres Bello currently occupied by students, commune of San Miguel, Chile, from on June 13, 2011.

The 2011 student protests in Chile began gradually in May, and can be traced to the so-called "penguin revolution", or 2006 student protests in Chile. It is also important to note that the student protests began on the heels of other national protests, over the HidroAysén dam project and gas prices in Magallanes Province. The protests are commonly portrayed as a new social movement loosely based on Spain's 15-M Movement or even the Arab Spring.

The protests were triggered in part by the initiative of the then-Minister of Education Joaquín Lavín to increase government funding of non-traditional Universities. Although, officially nonprofit, some of these institutions were known to use legal loopholes to turn profits. Lavín had invested in several firms that render services to Universidad del Desarrollo.

According to students cited by El Mercurio on June 13, there were 100 schools being occupied by students as a form of protest, of which 80 were in the Santiago Metropolitan Region Sources differ; Chilean police listed on June 13 only 50 schools as occupied.

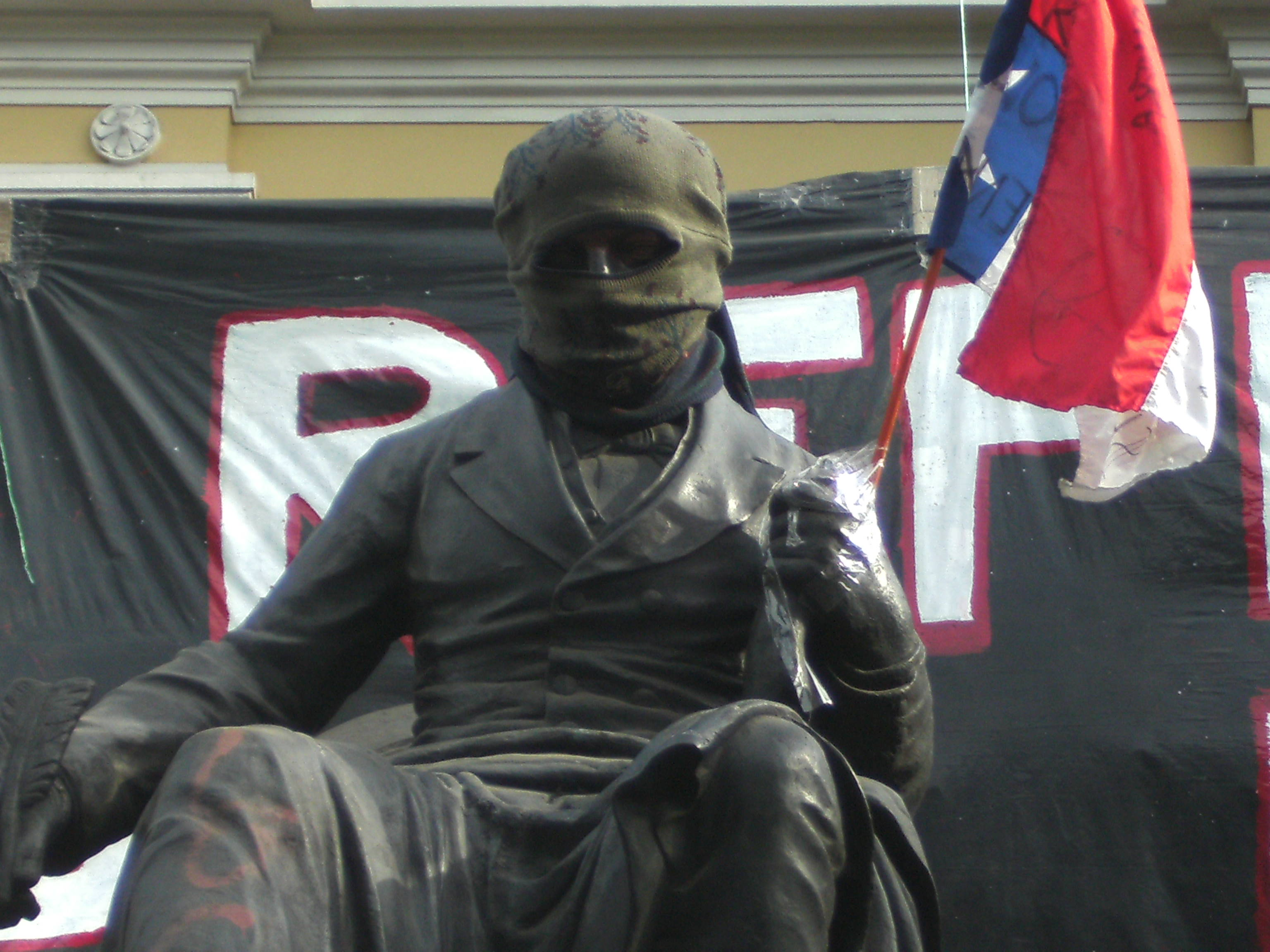
The statue of Andrés Bello in the middle of Alameda Avenue remained hooded for months, in response to the criticism that treats all protesters as "hooded."

On June 30, there was a massive demonstration that mobilized between one hundred and two hundred thousand demonstrators.

The student protests have included several creative acts which received foreign media attention, such as flash mobs and kiss-ins.

== July 2011 government proposal ==
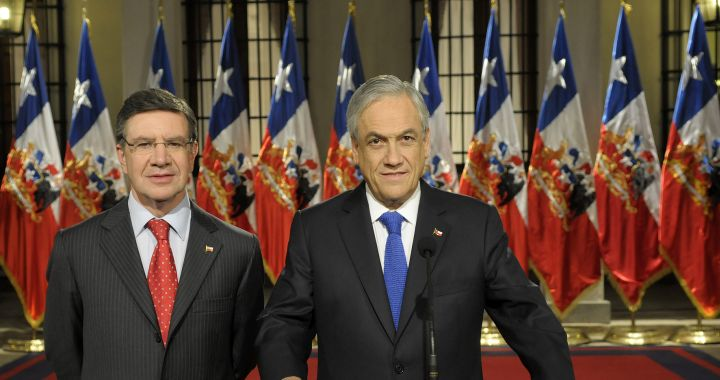
Chilean president Sebastián Piñera announcing with then- Education Minister Joaquín Lavín a series of proposals in a televised speech

On July 5 Chilean President Sebastián Piñera announced in a televised speech educational reforms that his government planned to enact in order to satisfy the student demands. The plans announced revolved mainly around a project labelled "GANE" (Spanish acronym for Grand National Accord of Education, forming the Spanish word for win), which would cost 4 billion dollars. The project is to be, if implemented, financed from the Funds of Economical and Social Stabilization (Fondo de Estabilización Económica y Social or FEES) with which a fund named Fund for the Education (Fondo por la Educación) will be created from which the dividends and interest (under 300 million dollars) will be used annually to support public education.

Piñera also announced the shaping of a new legal framework for universities which will allow higher education providers to legally engage in for-profit activity and rejected the public ownership of education proposed by students as a "serious mistake and something that damages deeply the quality as well as the freedom of education".

The announcement was received with skepticism by students, some of whom criticized harshly the announcements. Camila Vallejo, one of the movement's spokespersons and the president of the University of Chile student federation said that the presidential discourse "was a great disappointment and a backward step" and emphasized that the proposal to legalize for-profit activity in education, which is currently illegal but widely practised in private institutions, goes against the Chilean state of law and that the government rejected categorically the main point presented by the secondary students which was to place public secondary and primary education under state management instead of being under municipalities.

Additionally, some opposition senators from the center-left Concertación criticized the speech, signaling that the proposal was not "in tune with the student movement" After the televised speech students of the University of Chile went out from the university to protest against the proposal blocking transit in Avenida Libertador General Bernardo O'Higgins before confrontations with special forces of the police.

== Continued protests ==
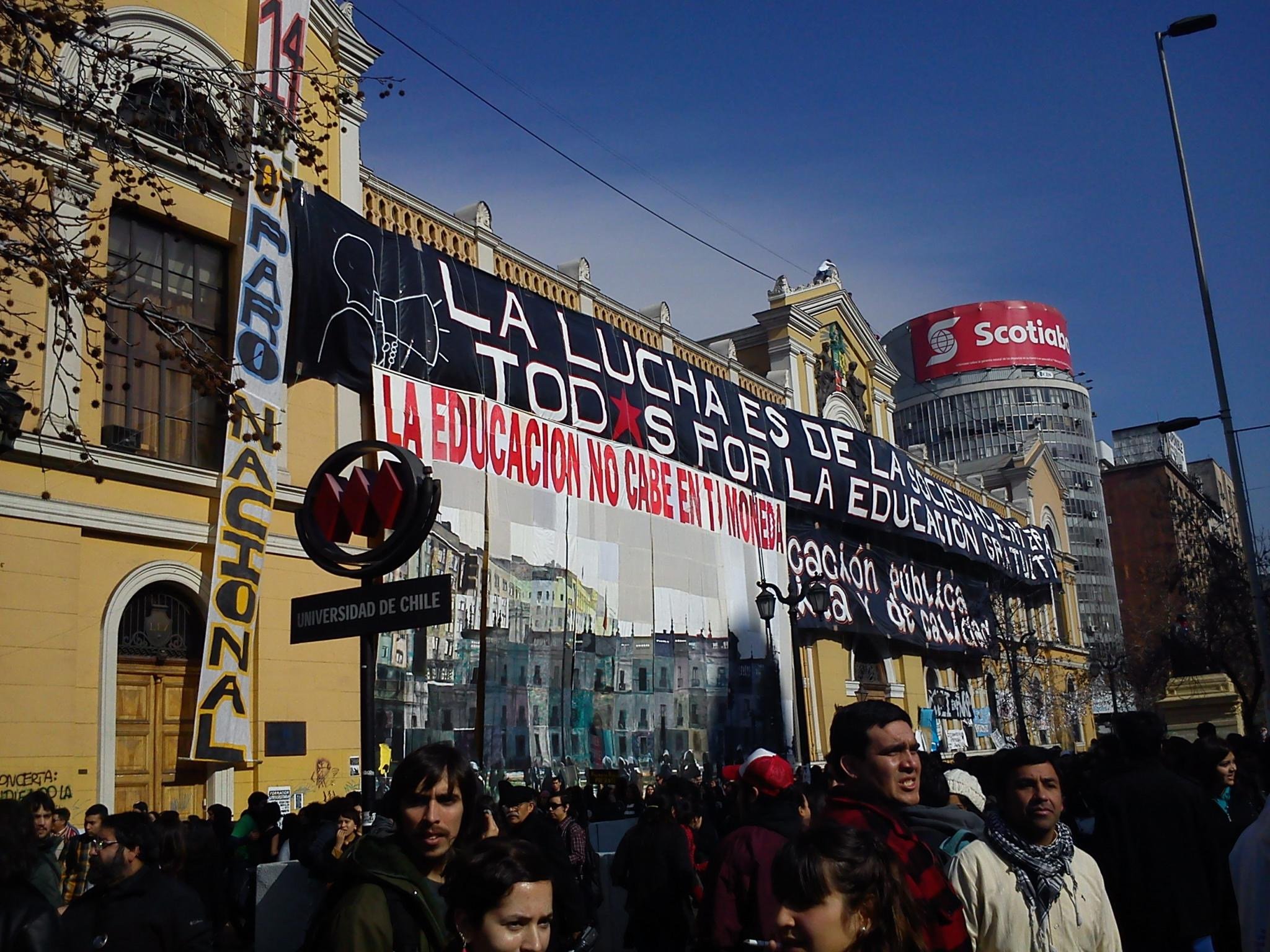
The front of the University of Chile, which is currently occupied by students. The sign reads La lucha es de la sociedad entera / Todos por la educación gratuita, which means "The fight is of the whole society / Everybody for free education".

Students marched on July 14 together with contractors from El Teniente mine that were on strike in one of the largest protests since the return to democracy in Chile two decades prior. Although the protests were downplayed by the Chilean government, they were described as a complete success by the organizers. On July 18, Chilean Minister of Education Joaquín Lavín was replaced by Felipe Bulnes, as President Sebastián Piñera opted for a cabinet shuffle in response to the months of protest. The change came two weeks without any clear movement on the issues, Lavín received a new ministerial role as Minister of Development and Planning. Meanwhile, the Chilean student federation insists that it will continue its occupations and other mobilizations, as well as attempt to broaden the movement into other political areas. On July 19, La Tercera reported that 148 high schools remained occupied, but some universities such as the Universidad Austral de Chile and the Universidad de Santiago de Chile were ending their occupations.

== August 2011 government proposal and subsequent protest ==
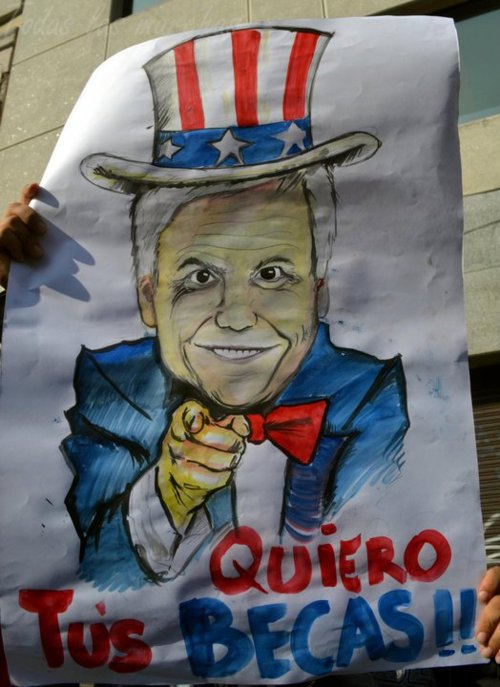
An allegory of Uncle Sam represented by Sebastián Piñera, asking for student grants at street protests.

On August 1, the government of Sebastian Piñera introduced a new 21-point proposal to reorganize Chilean education from pre-school to higher education and thus reach an agreement with the student movement. The proposal included many of the students' demands, such as:

- a constitutional guarantee to a quality education
- allowing student participation in university governance
- the end of local control over public secondary education
- increase university scholarships and provide help for people with unpayable student debt

However, student leaders did not accept the proposal and signalled that the student mobilizations would continue with a national strike and march on August 4 and an official written response on August 5. In interviews, they noted that the proposal did not criminalize profiteering in education, did not seek to provide free or equitable access to higher education, and was not specific. Using the same language that was used to describe the July proposal, the August proposal was called "a backward step" and "a band-aid solution."

The protests of August 4 were the most confrontational of the movement to date. 874 protestors were detained, and the center of Santiago was called a "state of siege" by University of Chile student federation president Camila Vallejo. Police cordoned off the streets and used tear gas. Protesters destroyed signs and set small fires in the street. Additionally, 90 carabineros (militarized police) were injured and a La Polar department store was burnt down. The evening saw a cacerolazo protest, where protesters bang pots and pans, often from their homes.

== Third government proposal ==
On August 18, the government offered a third proposal for ending the conflict; primary among the new means was a reduction of government-backed student loan rates to 2% APR. However, this proposal still has not placated the students, who held a massive march (100,000 marchers) on that date and another massive (estimates of attendance from 100,000 to 1,000,000) concert/protest on August 21.

=== August 24–25 protests ===
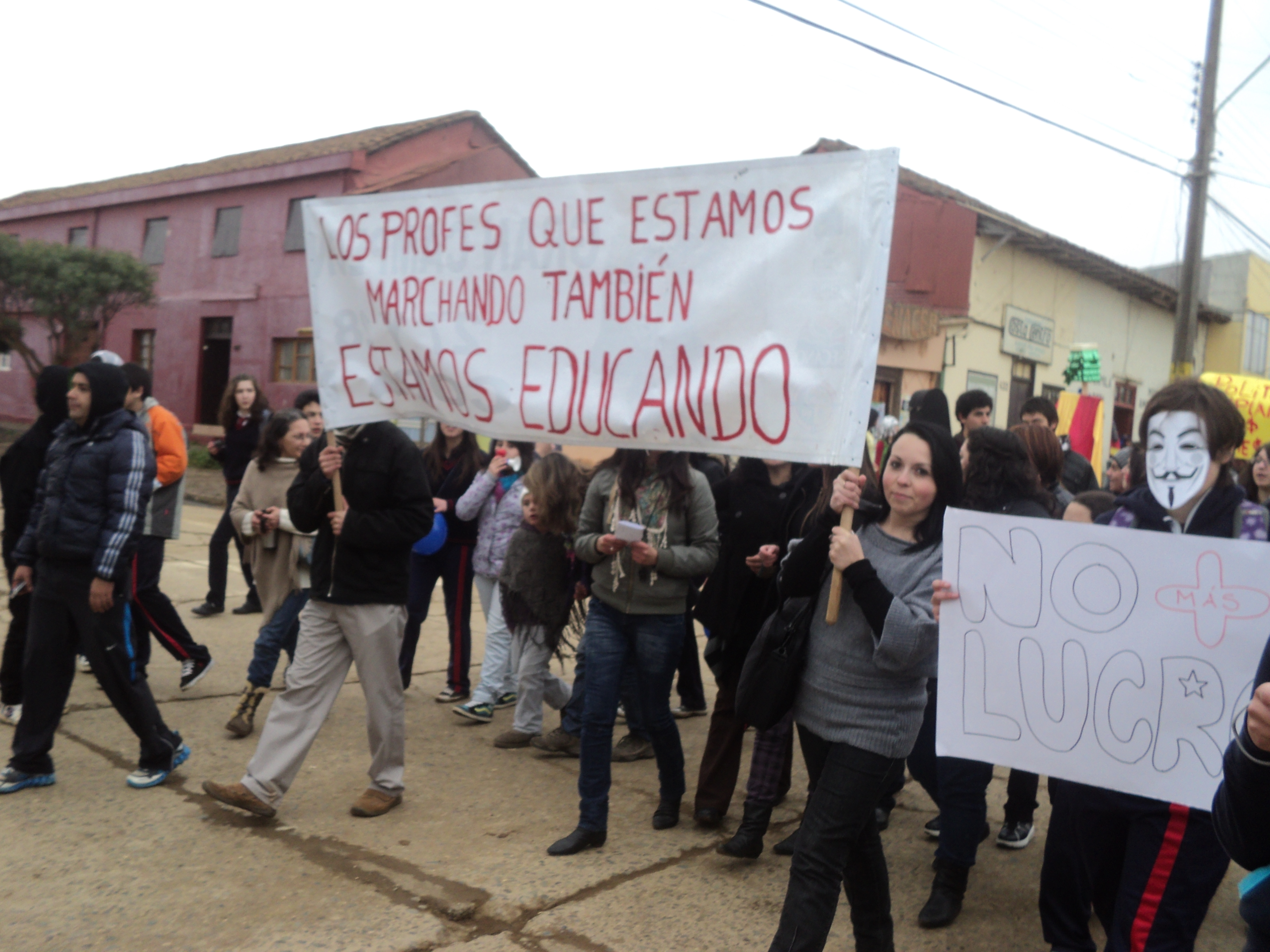
March for free education in Pichilemu on August 25. Large sign says "We teachers that are marching, are also educating." Sign at the right says "No more profit [in education]"

The Workers' United Center of Chile organized a nationwide two-day strike on August 24 and 25. During the strike, four separate marches took place in Santiago, as well as additional protests across the country. According to union officials, a total of about 600,000 people were involved in protests. On the 24th, upwards of three hundred people were arrested, with six police officers wounded in Santiago, where protesters constructed roadblocks and damaged cars and buildings. On the 25th, another 450 people were arrested with several dozen reported injured. In Santiago, police forces used tear gas and water cannons on protesters at the end of the demonstrations; earlier, some protesters had thrown stones and started fires. One person, 16-year-old Manuel Gutierrez Reinoso, later died from gunshot wounds to the chest; witnesses claim that he was shot by a police officer.

According to Claudio Urrutia, an official at the Workers' United Center of Chile, said that the Chilean government "is a right-wing government that has demonized social demonstrations [...] This government doesn't seek dialogue. We have to change the tax regime in this country." According to Labor Minister Evelyn Matthei, unions had refused to begin discussions with the government, and she was "working actively trying to resolve problems [...] in education and in labor and many problems that come from the past."

On August 31, the Education Committee of the Chilean Senate approved 4-1 a bill that would prohibit indirect or direct state support of for-profit educational institutions, a fundamental demand of the student movement.

== Pinochet coup anniversary protests ==
On the 38th anniversary of Augusto Pinochet's 1973 coup d'état against socialist president Salvador Allende on September 11, 2011, police arrested around 280 people in protests in Santiago. One 15-year-old girl suffered a bullet wound. "There were more than 350 places with barricades and blocked streets, and 130,000 homes suffered power cuts," said Deputy Interior Minister Rodrigo Ubilla.

A day later on September 12, 2011, 30 people stormed the headquarters of the Communist Party of Chile Central Committee assaulting party workers, and destroying computers and furniture. Carabineros attempted to storm the building on August 4.

== October breakdown of negotiations ==
In October the student representatives engaged in negotiations with government representatives headed by education minister Felipe Bulnes. The students withdrew from negotiations October 5 citing that the government had in their words only proposed an improved version of their "GANE" proposal from July, something students considered a "provocation". Camila Vallejo said that it was government that broke the negotiations by lacking "political will" and "capacity to attend the demands of the majority of the country". Students reported that minister Felipe Bulnes attacked David Urrea during the negotiations saying to him "you came here to break the negotiations, you are in a hostile position". In a meeting held in the Isla Teja Campus of the Southern University of Chile the Chilean university students union (CONFECH) representative David Urrea made a call to radicalize the movement and to "prepare for harsh times".

Government spokesman Andrés Chadwick blamed "the ultras" and "the intransigents" in the student movement as responsible for the breakdown of negotiations. Giorgio Jackson said of these comments that the label "ultra" form part of a strategy aimed to divide the student movement, a strategy Jackson said the government have been using since the beginning of the conflict.

== Second cabinet shuffle ==
In December 2011 Education Minister Felipe Bulnes was replaced by Harald Beyer, an analyst with the Center for Public Studies.

== Leadership changes ==
=== 2012 ===
In April 2012 Education Minister Harald Beyer proposed a new university funding plan, which would remove private sector banks from the process of granting student loans and reduce interest rates on loans from six to two percent. Gabriel Boric, president of the University of Chile Student Federation, rejected the plan, stating: "We don't want to trade debt for debt, which is what the government is offering us".

A national student strike was organised for 28 June. The strike was marked with a march in Santiago which was attended by 150,000, according to the demonstration's organisers.

In August 2012 a number of schools and universities including Instituto Nacional, Liceo José Victorino Lastarria and Universidad de Chile were occupied by students. The UNESCO seat in Santiago was also occupied by secondary students aiming to speak against the Hinzpeter Law at the UN. Government spokesman Andrés Chadwick rejected the demands of the students.

=== 2013 ===
Michelle Bachelet, member of the Chilean Socialist Party and candidate for a broad center-left coalition, won the presidential elections of 2013 stating that a principal objective of the New Majority coalition will be to achieve and establish a system of universal and free access to higher education within a time frame of six years. Meanwhile, in the elections for the Chilean parliament two ex main leaders of the protests, Camila Vallejo and Gabriel Boric became elected as members of parliament, one for the Chilean Communist Party and the other for the Autonomous Left party respectively. While this happened, the position of president of the University of Chile Student Federation, held previously by Vallejo and Boric, is now held by a member of an anarchist student organization (the Libertarian Students Federation), Melissa Sepulveda, who is a medical student.

=== 2015 ===
On October 14, 2015, members of CONFECH gathered at Plaza Italia in downtown Santiago and marched down Bernardo O'Higgins until they reached Echaurren Street. Due to increasing tuition and decreasing salaries, students and educators alike were advocating for structural changes surrounding Chile's for-profit education system that originated during the Pinochet Era. According to the Council of Hemispheric Affairs, Chile's current education system is "stratified" by socioeconomic status, making access to affordable education a contentious issue for today's youth. The U.S. Department of State's Overseas Security Advisory Council (OSAC) released an official warning to American companies based in Chile about potential violence between the student protesters and the militarized police force.

As predicted, clashes between students and the carabineros gradually ensued. Known for retaliating harshly, the metropolitan police responded to paint bombs being thrown at their armored vehicles with water cannons against protesters. As mentioned in "Take Back the Streets: Repression and Criminalization of Protest Around the World," Chilean law enforcement officers using "less-than lethal" weapons against demonstrators exemplifies the publication's proposal to increase regulation of less-lethal weapons, whether they be water cannons or tear gas.

In accordance to Brooke Gladstone views on mainstream media bias in "The Influence Machine," Chilean journalists have been criticized for their minimal coverage surrounding the ongoing student protests and cases of police brutality. For example, the 2015 Freedom of the Press Index declared that self-censorship and political bias is common in Chile where the media tends to promote governmental economic interests in addition to what some may call "infotainment."

== See also ==
- 2006 student protests in Chile
- 2008 student protests in Chile
- 2011 Magallanes protests
- Leaders of the 2011 Chilean protests
- List of protests in the 21st century
