= University of Chile Student Federation =

Coordinates: 33°26′28″S 70°38′7″W

- University of Chile Student Federation
- Federación de Estudiantes de la Universidad de Chile (FECh)
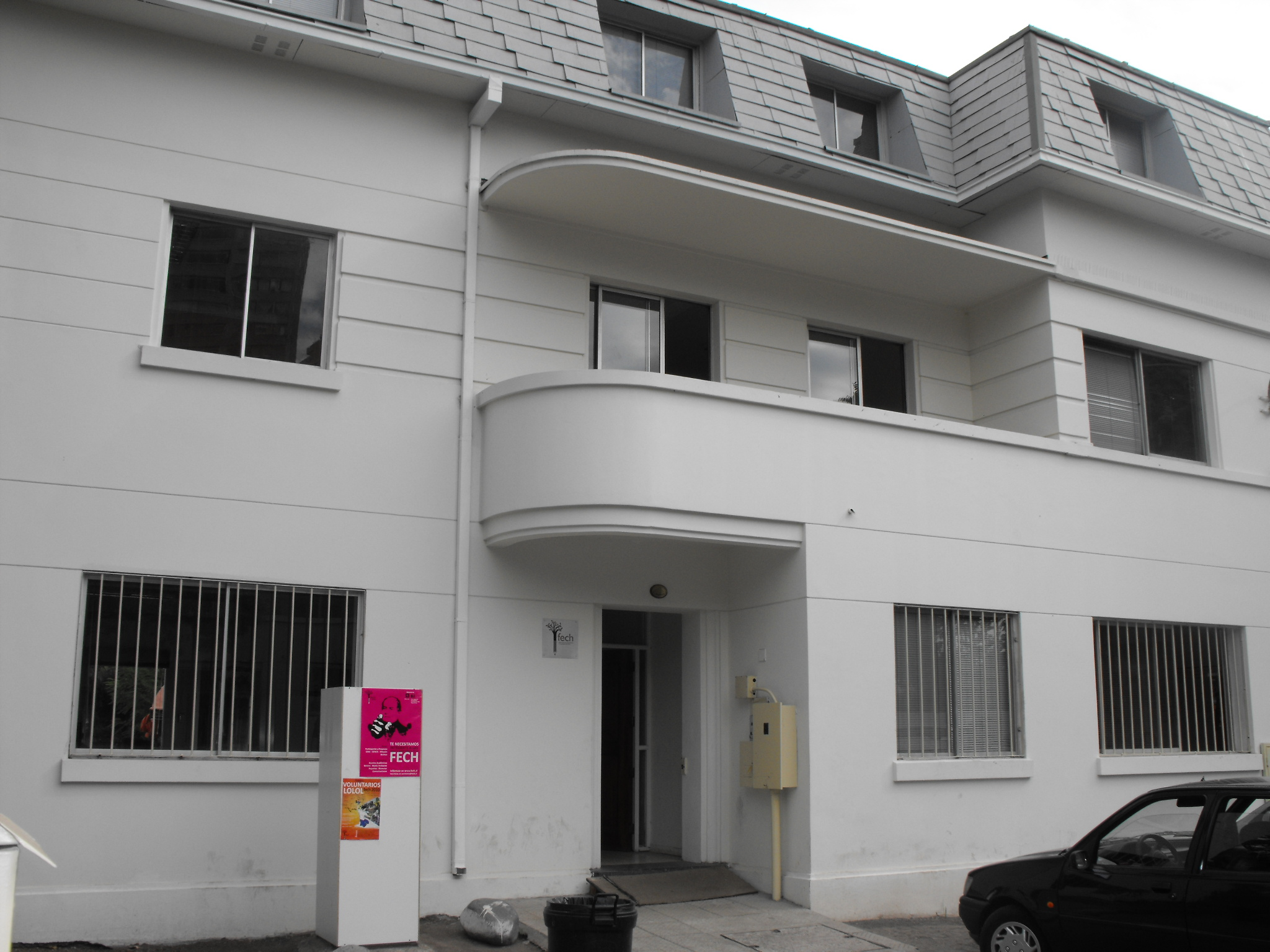
- Founded: 1906
- Headquarters: Santiago de Chile
- Location: Chile
- Key people: President vacant
- Website: fech.cl

The University of Chile Student Federation (Spanish: Federación de Estudiantes de la Universidad de Chile, abbreviated as FECh) is an organization that represents all students enrolled in both undergraduate and postgraduate programs at the University of Chile. FECh includes the student associations from various undergraduate programs. At a national level, it is connected to the Confederation of Chilean Students (Spanish: Confederación de Estudiantes de Chile, CONFECH).

Established in 1906, it stands as one of the earliest student organizations of its kind on the continent. Throughout its existence, FECh has played a significant role in Chile's political and social history, notably taking part in events such as the overthrow of the dictatorship of Carlos Ibáñez del Campo, the university reform movement that began at the Pontifical Catholic University of Valparaíso around 1967, protests against the military dictatorship of Augusto Pinochet, and various student movements since the restoration of democracy in 1990.

Throughout its history, several prominent figures have presided it, including Gabriel Boric, former President of Chile; Jose Tohá, a minister under Salvador Allende; Luis Maira; Jaime Ravinet; Yerko Ljubetic; Álvaro Elizalde; Nicolás Grau; Camila Vallejo; and Emilia Schneider, the country's first transgender woman to enter Congress.

== History ==
=== Founding ===
The FECh was founded on October 21, 1906, after a group of medical students sought to protest the seating of the ceremony held to honor their fight against smallpox, the FECh was founded the next day with the unconditional support of the Radical Party politician and University of Chile law professor Valentin Letelier – who served as rector of the university from 1906 until 1913. Letelier was one of the most prominent political and social thinkers of the time. As the rector of the university his support meant the federation had the support from the entire university and could make great impacts in uniting students past their classrooms. This began as reading groups and after school meetings.

The goal of the organization was to defend the rights and opinions of the student body of the University of Chile by being the main advocate for social and political rights for students, including better educational standards. Another goal was to grant social assistance to workers and the dispossessed. This included providing them with education launching programs to aid workers and those involved with the organizations activities.

=== Early-Mid 20th century ===
The FECh became the first federation in Chile and first student organization of its type in the Latin American. The FECh is one of the oldest and most influential student organizations in Chile, known for its involvement in various social and political movements throughout the country's history.

Following the rise of the middle class by the 1910s, the social hierarchy of the state began to fracture. As education rose so did the polarization of the wealthy conservative upper class and the poor working class. Soon social group's emerged aligning themselves with the poorer working class creating social programs and welfares for those in need. The FECh became a common meeting place for leaders of the AOAN, FOCh and IWW to discuses the organization of protests and other mobilization efforts. Leaders and members of the FECh followed the ideologies of Marxism, Socialism and Anarchism making them a threat to the nationalistic conservative "white guard" who often made threats outside the FECh headquarters even attacking prominent leaders Juan Gandulfo and Santiago Labarca.

On July 21, 1920, a group of conservative youth entered the federation's headquarters with force throwing books and furniture into the streets and burned them. The club was responsible for supporting underground print shops as well as the creation of pamphlets that members would pass around at protests, in the streets, and the university. Soon many printing presses and meeting places were raided and destroyed by Don Ladislao's secret police. Anyone involved with the social movement from strong activist to bystanders were targets to the authorities. Because of their involvement, many members of the FECh were imprisoned. There they were beaten and tortured in the penitentiary and jail. After facing consistent malnourishment and torture, the death of José Domingo Gomez Rojas, an aspiring poet as well as the student chairmen of the FECh, became a symbol of the injustice and mistreatment that many people endured during Don Ladislao's War. The impact of the student organization is still felt today as many recount the bravery of those student organizers of the 1920s laying done the foundation of the federation's beliefs and student action of today

Throughout its history the FECh has played a notable role in the social and political history of Chile. By 1931, the FECh had a prominent role in creating political action, and student strikes playing a significant role in the fall of the Carlos Ibáñez del Campo dictatorship in the 1950s. After feeling the weight of Campo's increasing repression couped with the world economic crisis, the FECh was a large contender in eliminating his dictatorship organizing large protest that would solidifying their role as an important organization in Chilean politics. The FECh also had a large hand in university reform processes initiated at the Catholic University of Valparaiso in 1967. By the 1960s university enrollment began to skyrocket, the FECh membership total began to increase. Broad educational reform spread throughout Chile by the mid-1960s.

The FECh became a large supporting group for Salvador Allende campaign by the late 1960s, this came after many political actors realized the significance of these student organizations being influential mechanisms that were largely politicalized. The night Allende had won the popular vote and became president, he gave his victory speech on the balcony of the clubs headquarters. His speech inspired many young leftists as he gave a special tribute to the youth in Chile for his success. The president had been an FECh activist and member in his youth. In an interview in 1971, he called upon the youth in Chile to keep revolutionary spirits high and keep up the enthusiasm to band together in times of need through Chilean fork lore and poetry.

=== Cold War Dictatorship ===
After the military coup d'état on September 11, 1973 the new military dictatorship under Augusto Pinochet sought to eliminate any form of political ideologies or organizations that did not conformed to what the regime wanted including many left-leaning political views. Universities were one of the hardest hit by this elimination. Many social and political organizations were destroyed as a result including the FECh. Any and all student social activities were proscribed and many of the FECh leaders were subjected to persecution. Pinochet also introduced a neoliberal system that evolved Chiles educational model subsidizing schools and private educations. This only increased the quantity of students needing education not the quality of the educators. The right to public education was diminished. This directly caused a large disparity between each level of education and social education inequality became prevalent in Chile.

Pinochet's goals with Chilean education sought to limit higher education and those who had access to universities. This included removing large amounts of funding to universities many having to shut down or increase tuition immensely to combat the loss of state funding, making the universities in Chile the most expensive in Latin America. The privatization of public education and the limit to higher education left a large gap of education inequality in the country that was felt even after the dictatorships was demolished. Those who were poor stayed uneducated and poor while those wealthy enough to afford higher education did so, with strict educational standards supporting the regime that could not be deviated from.

Between 1978 and 1981 the FECh was replaced by a new right-wing student federation, the Federación de centros de estudiantes de la Universidad de Chile (a.k.a., FeCECh), this quasi- student federation was directly controlled by non-academic actors appointed by the military government of Pinochet. FeCECh disbanded itself in 1984. During the 1980s the FECh played a leading role in student mobilizations in opposition to the military regime, and built themselves back up with the return of democracy in Chile in 1990.

=== Early 2000's ===
By the early 2000s, even after the rise of democracy, The class system Pinochet had instituted was not easily broken, neoliberal inequality dominated the education system. Even after the dissipation of the regime, education remained privatized. Even so, the gap between those who had access to higher education began to slowly shrink as new universities immerged. The requirements set by Pinochet to create places of higher education were reduced after democracy was put back into place. Soon by the late 1990s, 30 new universities were established and by 2010, a little over 1 million students were enrolled in private universities.

A new generation immerged of political involved students often called the "fearless generation" sought to engage in stronger political movements as the countries began to rebuild democracy. In this new generation of post-dictatorship youth, still feeling the left over effects of Pinochet's regime which were still deeply rooted even 20 years, often joined political organizations utilizing this as a reason to increase there involvement in the anti-neoliberal and social movements without the fear that democracy would be demolished. Student protest involving the FECh saw a significant increase between 2006 and 2011.

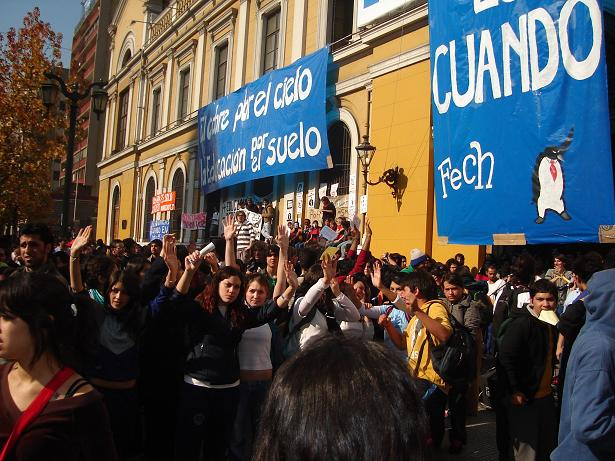
FECh takes over the Central House at the University of Chile during the Penguin Revolution.

In April 2006, the Penguin Revolution emerged as the first protest demanding better education and social reforms. Students felt the cost of education and transportation and entrance exams to unfair and limited many peoples access to higher education. Peaceful protests and nation strikes emerged with the support of the FECh The result of the 2006 student protests in Chile would leave a lasting impact and would directly influence the 2011 student protests in Chile.

The disparity in the education system led many students to rise in protests demanding change. In May 2011, student organization protest were on the rise. The CONFECH sought to organize and discuss a movement to mobilize education seeking to shape the nations political agenda, provide more state funding to more public universities, and overall better accuse to higher education. By July 5, 2011, President Piñera gave a speech that proposed a "new deal" reform which failed to uphold the students demands for better education, as a result the mobilization effect increased dramatically. Young adults ranging from high school to university students engaged and organized mass protests, huger strikes, class room walk outs and numerous marches across many Chilean cities.

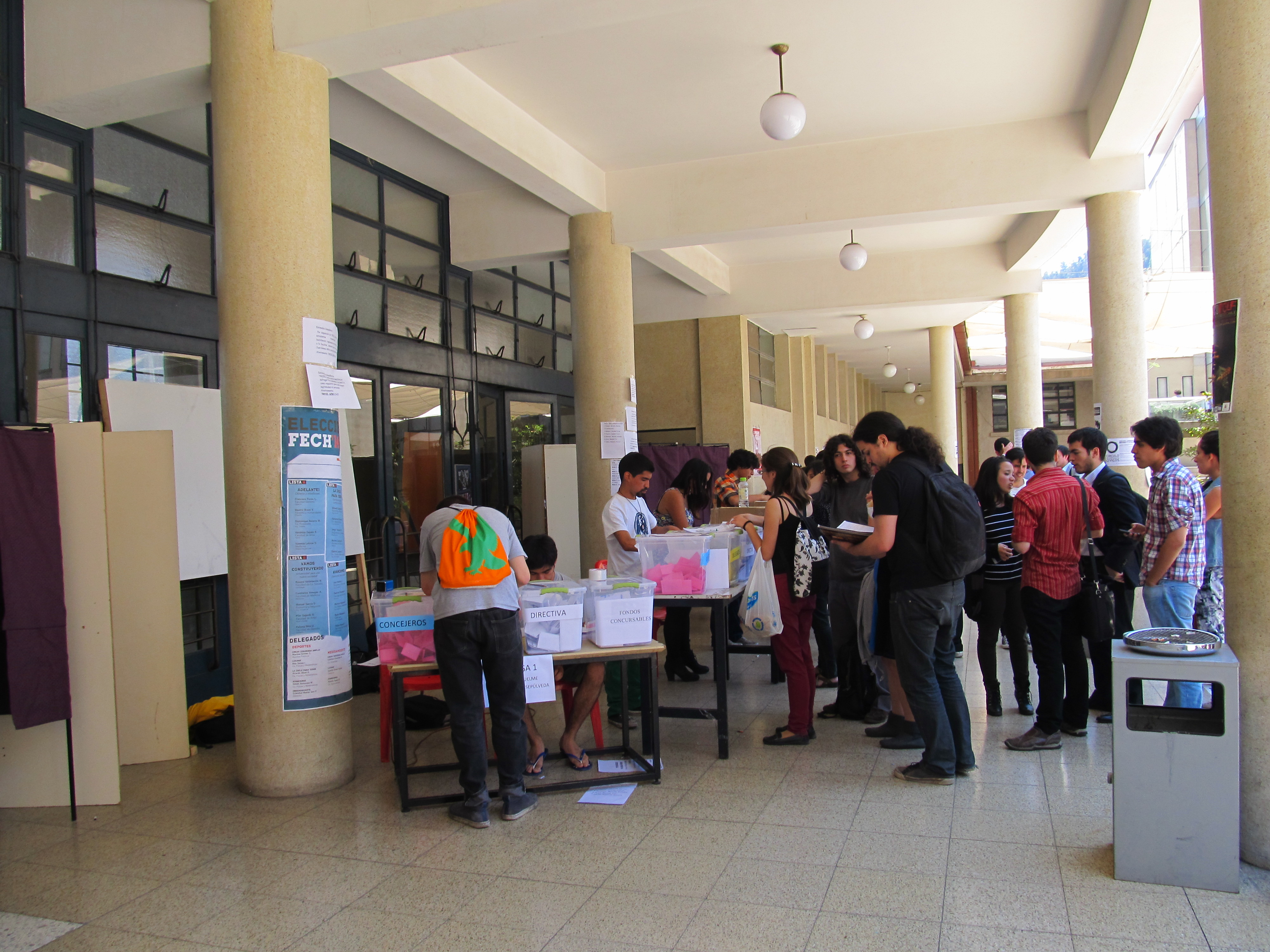
Election booth for the 2013 FECh elections

The FECh, along with many student organization in Chile, participated in the 2011-2013 Chilean Student Protests. The demand for better educational standards including increased state support, a more adequate admissions process valuing more fairness, and free public education. Back and forth proposals between the minister of education and the president against the CONFECH took place, often these proposals would not uphold the students demands. As a result, the CONFECH continued to protest in numerous ways including mass marches with over 600,000 people attending in August 2011. Camila Vallejo led the student protest as president of the FECh and spokesperson of the CONFECH. By late August the once peaceful protests became violent. Riots soon emerged with police using water canons mounted on police vehicles and tear gas being launched into crowd injuring over 250 students who took place in the march. Student led protests continued in 2012 and by 2013 with the presidential election Michelle Bachelet, the new president promised universal access to free education. By 2013, many students still felt as if the countries inequality distribution of wealth was the reason for the continuous disparity in education. The wealthy's unwellness to contribute in growing education in Chile fueled further grievances students were not able to resolve during the protests.

== See also ==
- Education in Chile
- 2011 Chilean protests
