= Education in Chile =

Ministry of Education
- Minister Undersecretary: Nicolás Cataldo; Alejandra Arratia

National education budget (2022)
- Budget: US$14.4 billion

General details
- Primary languages: Spanish

Literacy (2015)
- Total: 96.9%^{1}

Enrollment (2014)
- Total: 4.75 million

Attainment (2022)
- Secondary diploma: 68%^{2}
- Post-secondary diploma: 41.2%^{2}
- ^{1} Population 15 and over.^{2} Population 19 and over.

Education in Chile is divided in preschool, primary school, secondary school, and technical or higher education (university).The levels of education in Chile are:

- Pre-school: For children up to 5 years old.
- Primary school: (Enseñanza básica) for children aged 6–13 years old, divided into 8 grades.
- Secondary school: (Enseñanza media) for teenagers aged 14–18 years old, divided into 4 grades. Schools are divided by curriculum into:
  1. "Scientific-humanities". Geared to prepare students to enter university. From 11th grade (Tercero Medio), students can choose a subject in either science (math, physics, chemistry, biology), or humanities (literature, history, philosophy), for more advanced lessons.
  2. "Technical-professional". Designed to allow students to quickly enter the workforce after secondary education. Students are taught practical lessons in technical areas, such as electricity, mechanics, metal assembly, etc.
- Higher education:
  - University (universidad): These are divided between "traditional" universities (public and private universities created (mostly) before the 1981 reform) and private institutions.
  - Professional Institute (Instituto Profesional, IP): Private institutions offering professional degrees, except for those given exclusively by universities. They were created in 1981.
  - Technical Schooling Center (Centro de Formación Técnica, CFT): Also created in 1981, they are private institutions offering technical degrees only.

== Pre-school ==
Levels:

- Sala Cuna Menor: children between 85 days of age to one year of age
- Sala Cuna Mayor: children between one and two years of age
- Nivel Medio Menor: children between two and three years of age
- Nivel Medio Mayor: children between three and four years of age
- Primer Nivel Transición or Pre-Kinder: children between four and five years of age
- Segundo Nivel de Transición or Kinder: children between five and six years of age

The law establishes free access to the last two levels of pre-school. A constitutional reform in 2013 called for the law to extend free access to four levels, and make the last one mandatory and a prerequisite to enter primary school.

The coverage for pre-school in 2009 was 37.42% (for children aged 0 to 5) and 44.96% (for persons of any age).

== Primary and secondary education ==
The law makes primary and secondary school mandatory for all Chileans.

The Chilean state provides an extensive system of education vouchers that covers about 93% of primary and secondary students (the other 7% attend non-subsidized private schools). The system is based on a direct payment to the schools based on daily attendance.

Schools are either public (nearly all owned by the municipality of the commune in which the school is located) or private, which may receive government subsidies.

Private schools (subsidized or not) may be organized as either for or non-profit. In order to receive public funding, private schools must reserve 15% of seats in each class to students classified as "vulnerable" (based on family income and mother's level of education). Schools receive extra funding for each "vulnerable" student they enroll.

=== Primary ===
The 1965 reform established primary education as the initial cycle of schooling. Before that, by 1920, Chilean legislation had established four years of minimum mandatory education. By 1929 the minimum had been increased to six years. Since 1965, the primary level has been obligatory, with a current duration of 8 years in total divided into 2 cycles and 8 grades:

- 1st Cycle: 1st grade (age 6-7), 2nd grade (age 7-8), 3rd grade (age 8-9), 4th grade (age 9-10).
- 2nd Cycle: 5th grade (age 10-11), 6th grade (age 11-12), 7th grade (age 12-13), 8th grade (age 13-14).

=== Secondary ===
Secondary education is divided between Scientific-Humanist (regular), Technical-Professional (vocational) and Artistic, all lasting four years. The first two years are the same for the three kinds of schooling, while the third and fourth year are differentiated according to the orientation of the school.

The schools offering Technical-Professional programs are denominated:

- Industrial Schools: electricity, mechanics, electronics, informatics, among others.
- Commercial Schools: management, accountancy, secretary and similar.
- Technical Schools: fashion, culinary, nursery and the like.
- Polyvalent Schools: offering careers of more than one of those listed above.

Most of the students choosing the vocational branch come from disadvantaged socioeconomic background. Private school with subscribing-fees gathers less than 1% of the students.

Compulsory education only covered the eight years of primary school, but in 2003 a constitutional reform established in principle free and compulsory secondary education for all Chileans up to 21 years of age. This ensured twelve years of compulsory schooling, which was an unprecedented milestone in Latin America at the time.

=== Coverage ===
The net enrollment ratio (covering students of school age) in 2009 was 93.19% in primary, and 70.70% in secondary, while the gross enrollment ratio (covering students of any age) was 106.24% in primary and 94.68% in secondary.

Type of school dependency	Pupils (2014)	%
Delegated Administration	46,880	1.33
Private, non-subsidized	270,085	7.64
Private, subsidized	1,913,838	54.13
Municipal (public)	1,305,032	36.91
Total	3,535,835	100.00

=== Costs ===
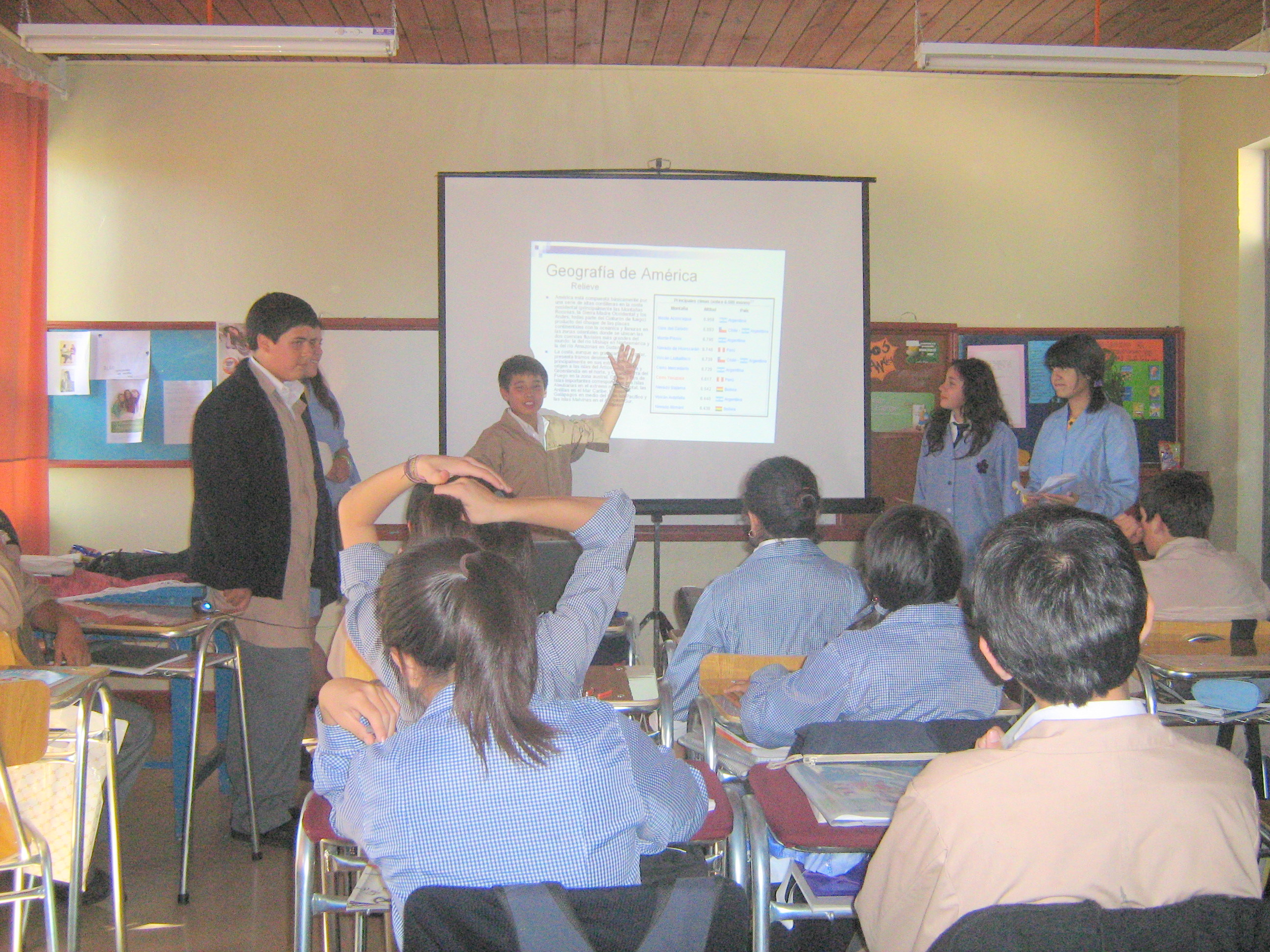
Chilean students presenting a PowerPoint about America, in Escuela Barreales, 2008.

Voluntary tuition
Public schools and subsidized private schools may charge a fee for the selection process, an annual price of enrollment (which, as of 2011, cannot be higher than CLP$3,500, or about US$7) and a monthly tuition fee (financiamiento compartido or "shared funding", also known as copago or "copayment"), which is voluntary for the parent. Enrollment and tuition fees are forbidden in pre-primary and primary school in these institutions. A fee to the Parents Center (Centro de Padres) is voluntary and cannot be higher than 0.5 UTM (Unidad Tributaria Mensual or "Monthly Tax Unit") a year (payable in up to ten installments), which was CLP$19,143 (about US$40) in 2011.

Mandatory tuition
Public schools and subsidized private schools have the same selection and annual enrollment costs as in schools with voluntary tuition, but they are allowed to charge a mandatory monthly tuition, which cannot be higher than 4 USE (Unidad de Subvención Educacional or "Education Subsidy Unit"). This was equal to CLP$72,763 in 2011 (about US$150) in both primary and secondary school. A Parents Center fee is the same as in schools with voluntary tuition.

Non-subsidized private schools are free to set the price, which may include enrollment and tuition costs, as well as a fee for applying to the school (paid once) and one for being admitted to the school (also paid once, and can be quite high in some exclusive schools). There may be other payments, such as to the Parents Center or for school materials, which may be included as part of the tuition fee.

There is a third type of public school, the Delegated Administration schools, which are owned by the State but managed and financed by private corporations. These cannot charge a selection fee. The annual enrollment cost is voluntary and the same as in schools with voluntary tuition. They are allowed to charge for tuition, but it is up to the parent to decide how much to pay. The maximum cost is 1.5 UTM annually, which was CLP$57,430 (about US$119) in 2011. A Parents Center fee is voluntary.

There is a fourth type of public school, administered by the Ministry of Education and completely financed by the State. Currently, there is only one such school: Escuela Villa Las Estrellas in Antártica.

== Higher education ==
=== Admission ===
==== University ====
Students can choose between 16 public universities and 43 private . Used to be 60 Universities, but Universidad del Mar went into bankruptcy and will be no longer providing education.

All public universities and 23 private ones use a single admission system called PSU (Prueba de Selección Universitaria, "University Selection Test"), designed and evaluated by the University of Chile, and consisting of two mandatory exams, one in Mathematics and one in Language. There are also two additional specific exams, Sciences (including Chemistry, Physics and Biology fields) and History, which may be required by some undergraduate programs. The cumulative grade point average achieved during secondary school is also taken into account in the final admission score, as well as the student's relative position in his class and two previous promotions. Every university assigns different weightings to the results of the various exams for the various programs offered. Some universities may require additional (non-PSU) tests or personal interviews for admission to some programs.

There is a gap on the PSU test scores regarding secondary education among public schools and private schools. This is almost 130 points difference in favor of private schools.

In 2014, a total of 247,291 people took both mandatory PSU tests (nearly 71 thousand were from previous promotions).

The drop out rate is 30% from first year students. The main factors are economic problems, vocational and psychological aspects.

==== IPs and CFTs ====
Professional Institutes (PI) and Technical Schooling Centers (CFT) require a secondary education license only for admission.

=== Coverage ===
The net enrollment ratio (covering students between 18 and 24 years) in 2009 was 28.88%, while the gross enrollment ratio (covering students of any age) was 38.73%.

Classification	Students (2016)	%
"Traditional" public universities	191,847	15.4
"Traditional" private universities	154,017	12.3
Non-"traditional" private universities	374,884	30.1
Professional Institutes^{a}	384,667	30.8
Technical Schooling Centers^{a}	141,720	11.4
Total	1,247,135	100.0

^{a} All are privately owned.

=== Costs ===
Since 1999 till 2012 the budgets for public education have increased from 3,8% of the GDP till 4.5% of the GDP in public spending. Evidence shows that Chile is spending almost 40% more of its GDP in higher education compare to the average OECD countries, from 2.4% of the GDP in Chile compare to the 1.7% of the GDP in the average OECD

Note: This section is outdated. Starting in 2016, 30 public and private universities are now free of charge for students belonging to the poorest 50% of the population.

All universities, institutes and technical schools in Chile charge enrollment and tuition costs. There are, however, several government scholarship programs granted to students based on merit or need. Socioeconomically disadvantaged students from any type of officially recognized educational institution may seek loans through private banks with the State acting as guarantee ("Crédito con Aval del Estado", CAE). There are also loan programs offered by the government exclusively to socioeconomically disadvantaged students of "traditional" universities ("Fondo Solidario de Crédito Universitario", FSCU). These loans —private and public— have a fixed interest rate of 2% and must be paid back by the student after graduation. For CAE loans, the payment is equal to 10% of the former student's annual wage, and 5% for FSCU loans. The debt is written off after 15 years for CAE loans, and 12 for FSCU loans. Most scholarships and loan programs offered by the government only cover a "reference" annual tuition cost calculated by the government for each program. The gap between the reference and the real tuition cost can be substantial at some private (and even public) educational institutions. Students are required to maintain a certain level of academic achievement to keep the benefit, which may vary from institution to institution.

There are also government-funded programs giving students: a monthly stipend, a debit card to buy food, and a student card to pay for cheaper transportation. All programs (except transportation) are based on merit, need, indigenous background or geographical residence.

In 2012 947,063 students were enrolled in tertiary education programs. Of these, 548,119 (58%) received either scholarships or loans by the government. Of the totality of programs awarded during 2012 (623,086; students may benefit from more than one program), scholarships represented 35% and loans 65% (14% FSCU and 51% CAE).

== School year ==
The school year is divided into semesters. The first semester runs from late February or early March to early July. Following a two-week winter break school resumes and lasts until late November or early December, followed by summer vacations.

The dates are set by the Ministry of Education in each Region. For example, in 2014 the start of classes is 5 March for regular students in the Santiago Metropolitan Region; a winter break runs from 14 to 25 July, with the second semester starting at 28 July; classes end at either 5, 12 or 19 December, depending on the program's length in weeks (38 to 40); students graduating from high school (fourth level of secondary education) end classes on 14 November, giving them time to prepare for the university admission test (PSU).

== Education reform ==
Chile as of 2014 is undergoing a significant reform to its publicly funded education system. Among the first proposals sent to Congress were the banning of mandatory co-payments, the removal of existing selection processes, and the conversion of for-profit schools into non-profit organizations. Another proposal (announced, but yet to be sent to Congress) is to provide free tertiary education to students in the poorest 60% of the population; this would apply to students of "traditional" universities and of "accredited" and non-profit technical schooling centers and professional institutes.

== See also ==
- 2006 student protests in Chile
- 2011 student protests in Chile
- Chilean university reform
- Ministry of Education of Chile
- Ranked lists of Chilean regions#By net enrollment ratio in education
- Ranked lists of Chilean regions#By gross enrollment ratio in education
