= Radical Governments of Chile =

The Radical Governments of Chile were in power during the Presidential Republic from 1938 to 1952.

The Radical Party's ideology found its roots in the principles of the 1789 French Revolution, upholding the values of liberty, equality, solidarity, participation and well-being. It had been created in the middle of the 19th century as a response to the conservative liberals then at power, and mainly represented the middle classes. It finally succeeded in being in power due to the Popular Front left-wing coalition, although its cabinets were fragilized by constant parliamentary instability.

== Pedro Aguirre Cerda (1938-1941) ==
The first Radical President, Pedro Aguirre Cerda, was a teacher and lawyer of the University of Chile, a perfect example of the socio-economical categories supporting the Radical Party. He was elected in 1938 as a candidate of the Popular Front, under the slogan "Gobernar es educar" ("to educate is to rule"). He narrowly defeated the conservative candidate Gustavo Ross, mostly because of the political backlash caused by the Seguro Obrero Massacre which followed an attempted coup d'état by the National Socialist Movement of Chile (MNS), intended to take down the rightwing government of Arturo Alessandri and place Ibáñez in power. The fascist MNS had merged in the Alianza Popular Libertadora coalition supporting Carlos Ibáñez, but after the attempted coup, Ibáñez opposed Ross, lending indirect support to Cerda.

Pedro Aguirre Cerda promoted the development of the technical-industrial schools as a means to promote the formation of technicians for the nascent industrialization of the country. He also created thousands of new regular schools and the growth of the university system to cover the whole of the country.

A strong earthquake shook Chile on January 24, 1939, killing more than 30,000 people and destroying much of the infrastructure. Aguirre's cabinet thereafter created the Corporación de Fomento de la Producción (CORFO) to encourage with subsidies and direct investments an ambitious program of import substitution industrialization as well as launching important public works. In the same time, the Empresa Nacional del Petróleo (ENAP) oil state company was created, as well as ENDESA electricity company, the Compañía de Acero del Pacífico (CAP) steel holding and the Industria Azucarera Nacional (IANSA) sugar company. This was the basis for the industrialization of Chile.

The German-Soviet Non Aggression Pact of 1939 during the Second World War led to the dismantling of the left-wing coalitions, as the Comintern then denounced the Popular Front strategy. However, following the invasion of the Soviet Union by Nazi Germany, the Chilean Communist Party joined again the government.

During his first year he had to face the military opposition to his plans, that boiled over with the Ariostazo in August 1939, led by General Ariosto Herera and Ibáñez. The leaders of the attempted putsch, in particular General Herera, was strongly influenced by Italian fascism, where he had been military attaché in the 1930s.

Furthermore, Aguirre also campaigned for a Nobel Prize for Gabriela Mistral, which only came to fruition under his successor, Juan Antonio Ríos. On September 3, 1939, 2,200 Spanish Republican refugees landed in Valparaíso on board of an old cargo ship, the Winnipeg, which journey had been organized by the Special consul for Spanish emigration in Paris, the poet Pablo Neruda.

In 1941 due to his rapidly escalating illness, Aguirre appointed his minister of the Interior, Jerónimo Méndez as vice-president, and died soon after, on November 25, 1941.

Aguirre Cerda Government:

He began his Government in very unfavorable conditions due to the January 1939 earthquake that devastated the provinces of Linares, Maule, Ñuble and Concepción. To mitigate the effects he created the Reconstruction and Relief Corporation.

One of his most fruitful initiatives was the creation of the Corporation for the Promotion of Production, Corfo, a technical body that marked the beginning of the industrialization process in the country. Corfo is responsible for the installation of numerous infrastructure works that allowed better quality for citizens.

Another of the pillars of his administration was education. Not in vain had he himself coined the phrase “Governing is educating”. To him is due the construction of more than 500 schools and numerous others aimed at professional education.

He had to face the international problems generated by World War II and the end of the Spanish Civil War. He also set the limits of the Chilean Antarctic Territory.

After almost three years of government, he died on November 24, 1941, victim of a serious illness. In accordance with the constitutional requirements, Jerónimo Méndez assumed the vice-presidency.

== Juan Antonio Ríos (1941-1946) ==
The left-wings' coalition remained intact after President Aguirre's death, united by a common opponent, General Carlos Ibáñez del Campo. The Democratic Alliance (Alianza Democrática) chose as candidate a member of the conservative wing of the Radical Party, Juan Antonio Ríos, who defeated Ibáñez in the February 1942 election, obtaining 55,7% of the votes. Ríos' presidency was marked by parliamentary instability, caused by rivalries between different political tendencies in his cabinet, and renewed influence of the Congress. The Chilean Communist Party opposed Ríos who had initially chosen neutrality and refused to break off diplomatic relations with the Axis powers, while the right-wing accused him of complacency with the Left. At the same time, the Chilean Socialist Party accused him of being too light on large firms and to abstain from passing labour legislation protecting workers'.

In 1944, the Radical Party itself presented to Ríos a serie of propositions which he deemed unacceptable. Those included the break-off of relations with Francoist Spain — diplomatic and especially economic pressure had caused him to finally break off relations with the Axis Powers in January 1943 — the recognition of the USSR and a cabinet exclusively composed of Radicals.

By breaking off relations with the Axis, President Ríos made Chile eligible for the United States' Lend-Lease program, and obtained loans necessary to help achieve an economic recovery. The close relations that emerged with the United States were, however, problematic for him at home. Furthermore, his refusal to implement the Radical Party's propositions (made in 1944) caused the resignation of all of the Radical ministers, leaving the President without a party. These internal divisions partly explained the right-wing success' during the 1945 legislative elections, which were a debacle for the Socialists and the Communists, who obtained close to no seats in Parliament. The Radicals themselves lost a number of seats.

Furthermore, the repression of riots on Plaza Bulnes in Santiago, leading to several deaths, gave another reason for criticisms against the President, and led to the resignation of part of the cabinet. Finally, shortly after the war, in October 1945, his entire cabinet resigned in protest of a state visit he made to Washington, D.C. Economically, he faced labor unrest at home, brought about, in large part, by the drop in copper prices worldwide. Faced with a cancer in terminal stage, he gave up his presidential powers in January, 1946, to his Minister of the Interior, Alfredo Duhalde Vásquez, who acted as vice-president until his death on June 27, 1946.

== González Videla (1946-1952) ==
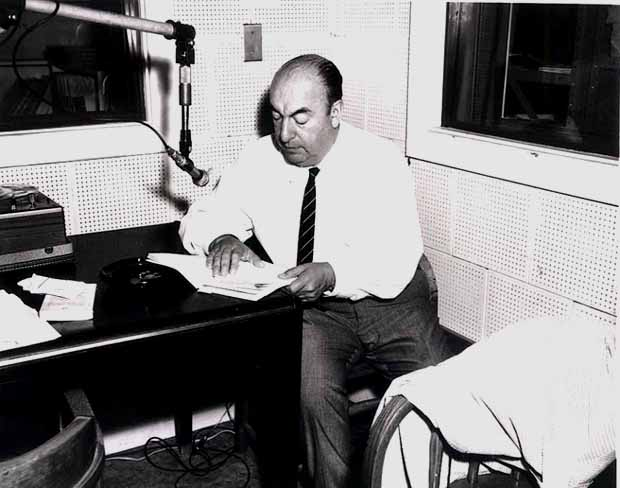
Then senator Pablo Neruda.

For the second times in five years, a presidential election was held on September 4, 1946, opposing the Radical candidate Gabriel González Videla to the physician Eduardo Cruz-Coke as representative of the Conservative Party, Bernardo Ibáñez for the Socialist Party and Fernando Alessandri Rodríguez for the Liberal Party. The Radicals, who had chosen as candidate a member of its left-wing, did not succeed in reviving the Democratic Alliance left-wings' coalition, as the Socialist Party decided to go alone for the elections. However, the Radicals did ally themselves with the Communists, the poet and Communist senator Pablo Neruda leading González's electoral campaign.

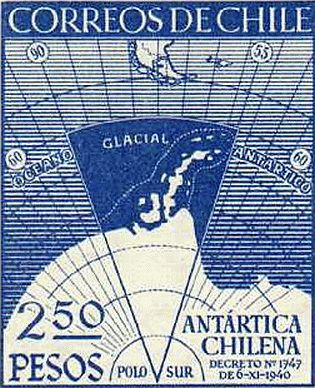
Commemorative stamp on the Declaration on the Antártica Chilena Province.

González was elected with 40% of the votes against 29% for the conservative candidate, Cruz Coke, and 27% for the liberal candidate Alessandri Rodríguez. Since González did not reach the necessary 50%, he had to be confirmed by Congress. He was duly confirmed on October 24 that year, following various negotiations between the parties, which led to the creation of a composite cabinet, including liberals, radicals and communists.

Once in the presidency, González had a fallout with the communists. Following the municipal elections, during which the Communist Party highly increased its representation, the PCC demanded more cabinet seats, which González refused to grant. On the other hand, afraid of the successes of the PCC, the Liberal Party withdrew from the cabinet. In June 1947, incidents during a strike affecting the public transports in Santiago led to several casualties and the proclamation of a state of siege in the capital. In August and October 1947, various strikes struck the carbon mines in the South, jeopardizing the government. Finally, President González's travel to the region succeeded in bringing back tranquility. A few days afterwards, the miners of Chuquicamata initiated another strike, prompting González to make increasing use of emergency laws.

Finally, under the pressure of the United States, González enacted a Law of Permanent Defense of the Democracy (Ley de Defensa Permanente de la Democracia, a.k.a. known as Cursed Law, Ley Maldita) which outlawed the Communist Party and banned more than 20,000 persons from the electoral lists. The detention center in Pisagua, used during Ibañez's dictatorship (and which would also be used during Pinochet's dictatorship), was re-opened to imprison Communists, Anarchists and revolutionaries, although no detainee was executed this time. Prominent Communists, such as the senator Pablo Neruda, fled into exile. He also broke relations with the Soviet Union and Warsaw Pact states. A pro-communist miners' strike in Lota was brutally suppressed. Demonstrations against what the communists called la ley maldita ("the damned law") led to the declaration of martial law, but were successfully repressed.

González's new supporters, which approved of his anti-communist stance, were the two right-wing parties, the conservatives and the liberals. He constructed a new cabinet made up of conservatives, liberals, radicals, some socialists, and members of the small Democratic Party.

González's tough stance against social movements led to protest demonstrations, allegedly in an intent to repeat the events of the Bogotazo in Colombia. However, these were quickly repressed, while González's government also had to confront itself, on the right-wing, to an attempted military coup which aimed at bringing back to power Carlos Ibáñez, the Pig trotters' conspiracy (complot de las patitas de chancho), thus named because the coup leaders met in a restaurant which specialized on this Chilean dish. He immediately ordered an investigation and the arrest of the coup leaders, including the head of the operation, General Ramón Vergara. Ibáñez, however, was absolved of all responsibility.

In the parliamentary elections of 1949, the pro-government parties triumphed. However, the unity between right-wing parties and radicals and socialists did not last long. Radicals were unhappy with the economic policies of the right-wing Finance Minister, Jorge Alessandri, no matter how successful they were in controlling inflation. When a protest by government employees broke out in 1950, the radicals immediately declared their support for the protesters' demands. The right-wingers responded by resigning from González's cabinet.

By losing the liberal and conservative support, González lost the pro-government majority in Congress. He was of course unable to achieve much thereafter, but he did manage to do significant improvements for women's rights. González's cabinet had the first woman minister, he appointed the first woman ambassador, and created the Oficina de la Mujer.

Despite this political, social and economical instability, González's government did manage some important successes, including the complete integration of women to political life, the remodeling of the city of La Serena, the development of an Antarctic policy with the creation of the Antártica Chilena Province — González was the first chief of state of any nation to visit Antarctica, and the Gonzalez Videla Antarctic Base was named after him — and the determination along with Peru and Ecuador of the 200 nautical miles (370 km) of the Exclusive Economic Zone.

== See also ==
- Presidential Republic Era
