= Presidential Republic (1925–1973) =

Chilean historical period

Republic of Chile República de Chile
- 1925–1973
- Flag Coat of arms

- Capital: Santiago
- Common languages: Spanish
- Demonym: Chilean
- Government: Unitary presidential constitutional republic
- President
  - 1925: Arturo Alessandri Palma (first)
  - 1970–1973: Salvador Allende Gossens (last)
- History
  - Constitution of 1925: 18 September 1925
  - Coup d'état: 11 September 1973
- Currency: Chilean peso (1925–1960); Chilean escudo (1960–1973)
Preceded by	Succeeded by
Parliamentary Republic; Socialist Republic of Chile	Military dictatorship of Chile

The Presidential Republic (Spanish: República Presidencial) is the period in the history of Chile spanning from the approval of the 1925 Constitution on 18 September 1925, under the government of Arturo Alessandri Palma, to the overthrow of the Popular Unity government headed by the President Salvador Allende on 11 September 1973. The period is concurrent with the "Inward Development" (Desarrollo hacia adentro) period in Chilean economic history.

== Carlos Ibáñez and Arturo Alessandri Palma ==
Headed by Colonel Marmaduque Grove, left-wing troops deposed the September Junta in the 1925 coup, and handed power to General Pedro Dartnell as interim president, with the hope of recalling Arturo Alessandri Palma from exile. Dartnell, however, decided to form another junta, the January Junta, which ended with Alessandri's return on March 20, 1925. Alessandri had a new Constitution drafted, and approved in a referendum by 134,421 voters on August 30. The Constitution, which was promulgated on September 18, 1925, reinforced presidential powers over the legislature. Furthermore, Alessandri created a Central Bank, initiating the first rupture with classical liberalism's laissez faire policies.

Alessandri's second government began with the support of left-wing and radical groups. However, this second group began to distance itself from the President. In March 1925, Alessandri's government repressed a demonstration, leading to the Marusia massacre (500 deaths), soon followed by La Coruña massacre on June 5, 1925.

Henceforth, Alessandri encountered opposition from his own Minister of Defence, Colonel Carlos Ibáñez del Campo who had also participated to the January 1925 coup and also enjoyed support from the masses. Alessandri wanted to run only one official candidate in the presidential election — himself — while Ibáñez gave his support to a manifesto drafted from various political parties which called on him to run as a candidate. This crisis led to the cabinet's resignation.

Ibáñez then published an open letter to the President, recalling him that he could only issue decree through his approbation, as he was the only minister of the cabinet. Alessandri then decided to nominate Luis Barros Borgoño as Minister of Interior, and resigned a second time from the presidency on October 1, 1925.

This break with the working classes caused Alessandri to try to maintain a right-wing-radical alliance until 1937, when it took a turn towards the left.

=== Emiliano Figueroa Larraín (1925–1927) ===
Alessandri's resignation prompted Ibáñez to convince the parties to find a common candidacy, as required by Alessandri. Emiliano Figueroa Larraín, the candidate of the Liberal Democratic Party, was thus chosen as the governmental candidate, and was elected in October 1925 with nearly 72% of the votes, defeating José Santos Salas from the Social Republican Worker's Union. Alessandri had been confronted by increased opposition from his popular Minister of Defence, Ibáñez. Both had struggled over the purging of the justice apparatus, Ibáñez opposing in particular the President of the Supreme Court, Javier Ángel Figueroa Larraín, who was Emiliano's brother.

In February 1927, Ibáñez succeeded in being designated as Minister of Interior (who, in case of a vacancy in the presidency, would be designated Vice President of Chile - in the Chilean context effectively the designated acting president), and in convincing President Figueroa to resign in April 1927. Ibáñez thus took his place as vice president and called for elections. He ran against communist Elías Lafertte, and won in May 1927 with 98% of the vote.

=== Carlos Ibáñez (1927–1931) ===
Carlos Ibáñez's administration remained popular until the outbreak of the Great Depression in 1931. He exercised dictatorial powers and suspended parliamentary elections, instead naming politicians to the Senate and Chamber of Deputies himself. Freedom of press was restricted, 200 politicians were arrested or exiled (among whom were Alessandri and his former ally Marmaduque Grove), the Communist Party was proscribed, and the workers' movement repressed. Before these actions, Congress allowed Ibáñez to rule by decree, finding support in Minister of Finances Pablo Ramírez.

In 1929, Ibáñez requested from Chile's political parties a list of their candidates for the general elections, in order to select for himself which ones would be permitted to campaign. Ibáñez then traveled to the resort town of Termas de Chillán, from where he selected members of both houses. The resulting legislative body which emerged from his choices became known as the “Congreso Termal.”

Ibánez's popularity was buoyed by loans from American banks, which helped to promote a high rate of growth in the country and the launching important public works projects. He ordered the construction of canals, bridges, prisons, ports, the Palace of Cerro Castillo in Viña del Mar, restoration of the façade of La Moneda, and increased public spending.

Ibáñez also reformed the police in 1927, merging the Fiscal Police, the Rural Police, and the Cuerpo de Carabineros into the Carabineros de Chile; he also appointed himself their first Director General. Ibáñez also created the Chilean Air Force, LAN Airlines and the COSACH.

In June 1929, Ibáñez signed the Treaty of Lima with Peru, whereby Chile agreed to return Tacna Province—which had been seized during the War of the Pacific—to Peru in exchange for financial compensation.

Ibáñez's popularity diminished once the effects of the Great Crash started to be felt in Chile at the end of 1930. The prices of saltpeter and copper, on which the Chilean economy depended, plummeted. As a result, all loans were halted and recalled. With no influx of foreign currency and protectionist policies in the United States and Europe, Chile was nearly bankrupt. Tens of thousands of workers in the country's northern mines became unemployed within weeks.

Although Ibáñez's government increased export taxes to 71% and imposed restrictions on exit of devises, he did not the balance of trade, leading to a depletion of Chile's gold reserves. On July 13, 1931, Ibáñez named a "Cabinet of National Salvation" (Gabinete de Salvación Nacional) whose members included Pedro Blanquier and Juan Esteban Montero. Ibáñez's popularity dropped further as Blanquier's revelations on the state of Chile's finances were disseminated widely by Montero's relaxed censorship of the press.

Ibáñez's lavish public spending did not alleviate the situation; his opponents, primarily the exiled Grove and Alessandri, began to plan a comeback. Several conspiracies attempted to remove Ibáñez from power.

Public unrest followed, during which students from the University of Chile and Pontifical Catholic University of Chile protested, later joined by physicians and lawyers. Carabineros killed more than ten people, resulting in Ibáñez's resignation on July 26, 1931, followed by his exile the next day. Before leaving, Ibáñez designated Pedro Opazo as his successor; he, in turn, resigned in favor of Interior Minister Juan Esteban Montero, a member of the Radical Party, who was proclaimed the new president by Congress.

=== The Socialist Republic (1931–1932) ===
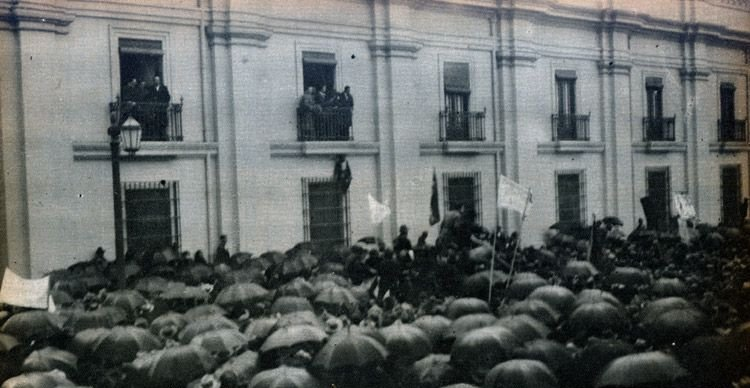
March in support of the proclamation of the Socialist Republic of Chile, in front of La Moneda Palace (June 12, 1932)

Meanwhile, Alessandri had returned to Chile, and the presidential campaign began, with Alessandri running against Juan Montero. The October 1931 Presidential election was this time won by the Radical candidate Montero, elected with 64% of the votes, defeating Alessandri, the candidate of the Liberals (35%).

A short time after his investiture in December 1931, President Montero was confronted by the Escuadra uprising, during which revolutionaries took some military ships and sank them in the Bay of Coquimbo. Although the mutiny was peacefully resolved after the rebels' surrender, the fragility of the new government was exposed to the public. On June 4, 1932, planes from El Bosque Air Base fled over the presidential palace, La Moneda, leading to the resignation of Montero's cabinet. The putsch's leaders, Marmaduque Grove, Carlos Dávila and Eugenio Matte, proclaimed the Socialist Republic of Chile.

The military junta dissolved Congress, ordered to the Caja de Crédito Popular banking institution to return pawned objects to their owners and decreed three days of closure of the banks. The new junta was however deeply divided, and on June 16, 1932, less than two weeks after the coup, Carlos Dávila deposed Grove and Matte and deported them to the Easter Islands. Dávila proclaimed himself "provisional President" on July 8, 1932.

The Armed Forces did not support Dávila. On September 13, 1932, they forced him to cede power to his Minister of Interior, General Guillermo Blanche Espejo, who was a supporter of ex-President Carlos Ibáñez.

General Espejo, who was not keen on organizing elections, and who was in turn threatened with a mutiny from the garrisons of Antofagasta and Concepción, ceded power to the President of the Supreme Court, Abraham Oyanedel, who called for elections. The center-right candidate, Arturo Alessandri, subsequently won 54% of the votes in the October 30, 1932 presidential election, defeating his still-exiled opponent Marmaduque Grove, who obtained 18%.

=== Arturo Alessandri (1932–1938) ===
In order to see off the threats of a coup, Alessandri relied on the republican forces, trusted to repress any revolts and to not get involved in politics. They were created shortly before Alessandri's return, as a consequence of the civil movement. They functioned in secret and then publicly, marching in a great parade May 7, 1933 in front of the President, who saluted them. They disbanded in 1936, having considered their mission complete. The President asked the Parliament on several occasions to vote for a state of constitutional exception, resulting in actions such as the famous burning of the 285th issue of the satirical magazine Topaze, which published a caricature of Alessandri he considered offensive.

Such precautions were not without reason, especially considering the appearance of new violent movements, such as the Nazi-inspired National Socialist Movement of Chile of Jorge González von Marées. In 1934, the rural rebellion of Ranquil was crushed, 477 workers and Mapuches being killed during the Ranquil Massacre in the upper Bio-Bio River, which had recently been opened for Chilean and foreign settlers of the occupation of the Araucania.

In the economic sphere, the recovery from the crisis of 1929 was begun with the work of Treasury Minister Gustavo Ross, a pragmatic liberal who implemented a "development inwards" approach to growth. With respect to nitrates, he dissolved COSACH and created COVENSA (Corporation of Nitrate and Iodine Sale), a multi-faceted distributor rather than a producer. He balanced the fiscal deficit with new taxes and resumed payment of the external debt, with losses for holders of Chilean bonds. When the government achieved a surplus, they focused on public works, most notably the construction of the National Stadium in Santiago, inaugurated in December 1938.

== The Radical Governments (1938–1952) ==
The Radical Party's ideology was rooted in the principles of the 1789 French Revolution, upholding the values of liberty, equality, solidarity, participation and well-being. It had been created in the middle of the 19th century as a response to the conservative liberals then in power, and mainly represented the middle classes. It finally succeeded in gaining power as part of the Popular Front left-wing coalition, although its cabinets were fragile due to constant parliamentary instability.

=== Pedro Aguirre Cerda (1938–1941) ===
The first Radical President, Pedro Aguirre Cerda, was a teacher and lawyer from the University of Chile, a perfect example of the socio-economic classes supporting the Radical Party. He was elected in 1938 as the candidate of the Popular Front, under the slogan "Gobernar es educar" ("to educate is to rule"). He narrowly defeated the conservative candidate Gustavo Ross, mostly because of the political backlash caused by the Seguro Obrero Massacre which followed an attempted coup d'état by the National Socialist Movement of Chile (MNS), intended to take down the rightwing government of Arturo Alessandri and place Ibáñez in power. The fascist MNS had merged into the Alianza Popular Libertadora coalition supporting Carlos Ibáñez, but after the attempted coup, Ibáñez opposed Ross, lending indirect support to Aguirre.

Pedro Aguirre Cerda promoted the development of technical-industrial schools as a means to promote the training of technicians for the nascent industrialization of the country. He also created thousands of new regular schools and the expanded the university system to cover the whole of the country.

A strong earthquake shook Chile on January 24, 1939, killing more than 30,000 people and destroying much of the infrastructure. Aguirre's cabinet thereafter created the Corporación de Fomento de la Producción (CORFO) to encourage an ambitious program of import substitution industrialization through subsidies and direct investments as well as launching important public works. At the same time, the Empresa Nacional del Petróleo (ENAP) oil state company was created, as well as ENDESA electricity company, the Compañía de Acero del Pacífico (CAP) steel holding and the Industria Azucarera Nacional (IANSA) sugar company. This was the basis for the industrialization of Chile.

The German–Soviet Non Aggression Pact of 1939 during the Second World War led to the dismantling of the left-wing coalition, as the Comintern then abandoned the Popular Front strategy and anti-fascism in favour of advocating peace with Germany. However, following the invasion of the Soviet Union by Nazi Germany, the Chilean Communist Party joined again the government.

During Aguirre's first year he had to face the military opposition to his plans, which boiled over with the Ariostazo in August 1939, led by General Ariosto Herera and Ibáñez. The leaders of the attempted putsch, in particular General Herera, were strongly influenced by Italian fascism: Herera had served in Italy as a military attaché in the 1930s.

Aguirre also campaigned for a Nobel Prize for Gabriela Mistral, a campaign which achieved its objective under his successor, Juan Antonio Ríos. On September 3, 1939, 2,200 Spanish Republican refugees landed in Valparaíso on board of an old cargo ship, the Winnipeg, whose journey had been organized by the Special consul for Spanish emigration in Paris, the poet Pablo Neruda.

In 1941 due to his rapidly escalating illness, Aguirre appointed his minister of the Interior, Jerónimo Méndez as vice-president, and died soon after, on November 25, 1941.

=== Juan Antonio Ríos (1942–1946) ===
The left-wing coalition remained intact after President Aguirre's death, united by a common opponent, General Carlos Ibáñez del Campo. The Democratic Alliance (Alianza Democrática) chose as its candidate a member of the conservative wing of the Radical Party, Juan Antonio Ríos, who defeated Ibáñez in the February 1942 election, obtaining 56% of the votes. Ríos' presidency was marked by parliamentary instability, caused by rivalries between different political tendencies in his cabinet, and the renewed influence of Congress. The Chilean Communist Party opposed Ríos who had initially chosen neutrality and refused to break off diplomatic relations with the Axis powers, while the right-wing accused him of complacency regarding the Left. At the same time, the Chilean Socialist Party accused him of being too laissez-faire regarding big business and criticized him for not passing labour legislation to protect workers.

In 1944, the Radical Party presented a series of proposals to Rios, which he deemed unacceptable. Those included the break-off of relations with Francoist Spain – diplomatic and especially economic pressure had caused him to finally break off relations with the Axis Powers in January 1943 – the recognition of the USSR and a cabinet exclusively composed of Radicals.

By breaking off relations with the Axis, President Ríos made Chile eligible for the United States' Lend-Lease program, and obtained loans necessary to help Chile's economic recovery. The close relations that developed with the United States were, however, problematic for him at home. Furthermore, his refusal to implement the Radical Party's propositions caused the resignation of all of the Radical ministers, leaving the President without a party. These internal divisions partly explained the right-wing success during the 1945 legislative elections, which were a debacle for the Socialists and the Communists, who obtained close to no seats in Parliament. The Radicals themselves lost a number of seats.

Furthermore, the repression of riots on Plaza Bulnes in Santiago, leading to several deaths, gave further ammunition to critics of the President, and led to the resignation of members of the cabinet. Finally, shortly after the war, in October 1945, his entire cabinet resigned in protest of a state visit he made to Washington, DC. Economically, he faced labor unrest at home, brought about, in large part, by the drop in copper prices worldwide. Faced with terminal cancer, he gave up his presidential powers in January 1946 in favour of his Minister of the Interior, Alfredo Duhalde Vásquez, who acted as vice-president until his death on June 27, 1946.

=== Gabriel González Videla (1946–1952) ===
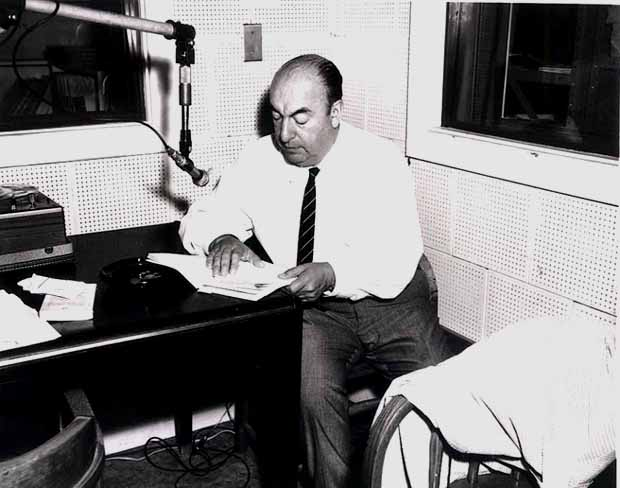
Senator Pablo Neruda

For the second time in five years, a presidential election was held on September 4, 1946, opposing the Radical candidate Gabriel González Videla to the physician Eduardo Cruz-Coke as representative of the Conservative Party, Bernardo Ibáñez for the Socialist Party and Fernando Alessandri Rodríguez for the Liberal Party. The Radicals, who had chosen a member of its left-wing as their candidate, did not succeed in reviving the Democratic Alliance left-wing coalition, as the Socialist Party decided to go it alone for the elections. However, the Radicals did ally themselves with the Communists, with the poet and Communist senator Pablo Neruda leading González's electoral campaign.

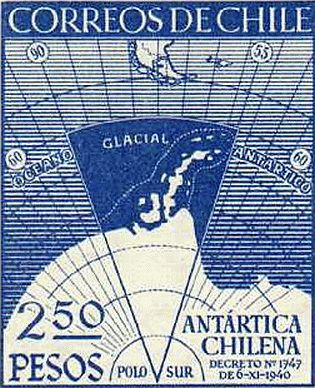
Commemorative stamp on the Declaration on the Antártica Chilena Province

González was elected with 40% of the votes against 29% for the conservative candidate, Cruz Coke, and 27% for the liberal candidate Alessandri Rodríguez. Since González did not reach the necessary 50%, he had to be confirmed by Congress. He was duly confirmed on October 24 that year, following various negotiations between the parties, which led to the creation of a composite cabinet, including liberals, radicals and communists.

Once in the presidency, González had a fallout with the communists. Following the municipal elections, during which the Communist Party greatly increased its representation, the PCC demanded more cabinet seats, which González refused to grant. On the other hand, afraid of the success of the PCC, the Liberal Party withdrew from the cabinet. In June 1947, incidents during a strike affecting public transport in Santiago led to several casualties and the proclamation of a state of siege in the capital. In August and October 1947, various strikes occurred in the coal mines in the South, jeopardizing the government. Finally, President González's travel to the region succeeded in restoring tranquility. A few days afterwards, the miners of Chuquicamata initiated another strike, prompting González to make increasing use of emergency laws.

Finally, under the pressure of the United States, González enacted a Law of Permanent Defense of the Democracy (Ley de Defensa Permanente de la Democracia, aka known as Cursed Law, Ley Maldita) which outlawed the Communist Party and banned more than 20,000 persons from the electoral registers. The detention center in Pisagua, used during Ibañez's dictatorship (and which would also be used during Pinochet's dictatorship), was re-opened to imprison Communists, Anarchists and revolutionaries, although no detainee was executed this time. Prominent Communists, such as senator Pablo Neruda, fled into exile. He also broke off diplomatic relations with the Soviet Union and Warsaw Pact states. A pro-communist miners' strike in Lota was brutally suppressed. Demonstrations against what the communists called la ley maldita ("the damned law") led to the declaration of martial law, but were successfully repressed.

González's new supporters, who approved of his anti-communist stance, were the two right-wing parties, the conservatives and the liberals. He assembled a new cabinet made up of conservatives, liberals, radicals, some socialists, and members of the small Democratic Party.

González's tough stance against social movements led to protests, allegedly in an intent to repeat the events of the Bogotazo in Colombia. However, these were quickly repressed, while González's government also had to confront, from the right, an attempted military coup which aimed at bringing back Carlos Ibáñez to power, the Pig Trotters conspiracy (complot de las patitas de chancho), thus named because the coup leaders met in a restaurant which specialized in this Chilean dish. He immediately ordered an investigation and the arrest of the coup leaders, including the head of the operation, General Ramón Vergara. Ibáñez, however, was absolved of all responsibility.

In the parliamentary elections of 1949, the pro-government parties triumphed. However, the unity between right-wing parties and radicals and socialists did not last long. Radicals were unhappy with the economic policies of the right-wing Finance Minister, Jorge Alessandri, no matter how successful they were in controlling inflation. When a protest by government employees broke out in 1950, the radicals immediately declared their support for the protesters' demands. The right-wingers responded by resigning from González's cabinet.

By losing the liberal and conservative support, González lost the pro-government majority in Congress. He was of course unable to achieve much thereafter, but he did manage to make significant improvements in women's rights. González appointed the first female cabinet minister and the first female ambassador, and created the Oficina de la Mujer.

Despite this political, social and economical instability, González's government did achieve some important successes, including the complete integration of women in political life, the remodeling of the city of La Serena, the development of an Antarctic policy with the creation of the Antártica Chilena Province – González was the first chief of state of any nation to visit Antarctica, and the Gonzalez Videla Antarctic Base was named after him – and the determination along with Peru and Ecuador of the 200 nautical miles (370 km) of the Exclusive Economic Zone.

== Start of mass politics (1952–1964) ==
Chile undertook an important economic transition after World War II. Due to the protectionist policies of the Radical Governments and of their predecessors, a quite diverse, although not that strong, national industry had developed in the country, leading to a deep renewal of the economical and social structure of Chile. For the first time, agriculture ceased to be the primary productive sector, and was replaced by the secondary sector (in particular by mining) and a primitive service sector.

On the other hand, the 1952 presidential election displayed the Chilean political field as divided between three sectors, including the emerging centrist Christian Democrat Party which had the support of a large spectrum of personalities. Furthermore, for the first time, women were granted the right to vote and stand for election.

=== Carlos Ibáñez (1952–1958) ===
Four main candidates ran in the 1952 presidential election. On the right, the Conservative and Liberal parties endorsed the centrist Arturo Matte; the Socialist Party ran Salvador Allende, his first campaign for the presidency, while the Radicals supported Pedro Enrique Alfonso. Finally, General Carlos Ibáñez again ran for the presidency as an independent. He promised to "sweep" out political corruption and bad government with his "broom" and was nicknamed the "General of Hope". Apart from his criticisms of the traditional political parties, he remained vague in his proposals and had no clear position on the political spectrum. He was elected on September 4, 1952, with 47% of the vote, and after Congress' ratification of his election, was invested on December 4, 1952.

Ibáñez's first issue was the 1953 legislative elections, which he hoped would bring him a parliamentary majority. He was mostly supported by the right-wing Partido Agrario Laborista (PAL) and, in a lesser measure, by dissidents of the Socialist Party, who had formed the Popular Socialist Party, and some feminist political unions — the feminist María De la Cruz was his campaign manager, but she then refused a ministerial office. He formed an initial cabinet which included contradictory figures, but despite this initial fragility, managed to win some successes in the 1953 elections. Despite the latter, he was still at the mercy of an unified opposition.

Ibáñez's second term was a very modest success. By that time he was already old and ailing, and he left government mostly to his cabinet. Elected on a program promising to put an end to chronic inflation in the Chilean economy, Ibáñez decided to freeze wages and prices, leading to stagnation of economic growth and in turn a relative increase in civil unrest. Inflation, however, continued, skyrocketing to 71% in 1954 and 83% in 1955. Helped by the Klein-Sacks mission, Ibáñez managed to reduce it to 33% when he left the presidency. During his term, public transport costs rose by 50% and economic growth fell to 2.5%.

Now much more of a centrist politically, Ibáñez won the support of many left-wingers by repealing the Ley de Defensa de la Democracia (Law for the Defense of Democracy), which had banned the Communist Party. However, in 1954, a strike in the copper mines extended itself to all of the country. Ibáñez tried to respond by proclaiming the state of siege, but the Congress not only opposed this executive measure: it put immediately an end to it.

Some Chileans continued to support an Ibáñez dictatorship. These ibañistas, most of whom were young army officers inspired by the Argentine caudillo Juan Domingo Perón, created the Línea Recta (Straight Line) group and the PUMA (Por Un Mañana Auspicioso) to establish a new dictatorship. Ibáñez met with these conspirators, but ultimately his typical lack of trust ended the plans for a self-coup. A scandal rocked the Ibáñez administration and the Armed Forces when the press revealed Ibáñez's meetings with these conspirators.

At the end of his presidency, Ibáñez also clashed with the Federación de Estudiantes de la Universidad de Chile (FECh) students' union because of his decision to increase the public transport fares. 20 people were killed and many more injured during demonstrations in April 1957.

=== Jorge Alessandri (1958–1964) ===
This succession of problems led the Partido Agrario Laborista (PAL) to withdraw from Ibáñez's government, leaving him isolated. On the other hand, the Radicals, Socialists and Communists organized the Frente de Acción Popular (Front for Popular Action), presenting a common candidate to the presidency, Salvador Allende. Obtaining 29% of the votes in the 1958 presidential election, he was narrowly defeated by the former Minister of Finances and son of the former President Arturo Alessandri Palma, Jorge Alessandri Rodríguez, who obtained 32% of the vote. Alessandri's election was narrowly ratified at the Congress by a right-of-center coalition. For the second consecutive time, the President of Chile was not a "traditional politician" figure.

Alessandri's narrow victory made the 1960 municipal elections decisive. Although the liberal-conservative coalition did not win these elections, it succeeded in having a score decent enough to face the left-wing opposition. Alessandri continued to receive their support after the 1961 legislative elections, while the Radical Party entered the governmental coalition, leading the President to have control of both Chambers of Parliament, something which had not occurred in recent times.

Despite these electoral successes, Alessandri's tenure had to face two successive earthquakes, one on May 21, 1960, day of the inauguration of the parliamentary session, and another the following day, known abroad as the Great Chilean earthquake, causing local tsunamis and leading to 2,000 to 5,000 dead. Cities such as Puerto Saavedra, Valdivia, Osorno, Puerto Montt and Ancud were the most affected. Valdivia had to be completely evacuated following landslides threatening to block the outflow of Riñihue Lake, leading to the Riñihuazo damming project.

Thousands of volunteers helped survivors in rebuilding local infrastructures, while the United States, Cuba, Brazil, France, Italy and other countries sent international aid. Chile's situation forced the state to accept the US conditions for the receiving of aid via John F. Kennedy's assistance plan for Latin America, the Alliance for Progress, including the first steps of the Chilean land reform. The disaster led to renewed inflation, and consequently to important strikes during 1961, followed by copper miners, teachers, physicians, banks and ports. Despite this, the country was retained as the host for the 1962 FIFA World Cup, initially awarded to the country in 1956.

In the 1963 municipal elections, the liberal-conservative coalition lost many seats, while the Christian-Democrats and the FRAP (Socialists and Communists) made major gains.

== From the Christian-Democracy to the Popular Unity ==
For the first time in fifty years, a major new party appeared on the Chilean political scene, the Christian Democrat Party. On the right, the liberal-conservative coalition merged into the National Party, opposed to all progressive change within and outside of the political scene.

=== Eduardo Frei Montalva (1964–1970) ===
In the September 1964 presidential election, three candidates stood: Julio Durán on the right, representing the Democratic Front of Chile, a center-right coalition gathering the Liberal Party, the Conservative Party and the United Conservative Party which had participated in Alessandri's cabinet; Eduardo Frei Montalva for the Christian Democrat Party, and finally Salvador Allende for the FRAP left-wing coalition, unifying the Socialist Party and the Communist Party. Fearing a victory of the Marxist candidate Allende, especially in the context of the United States embargo against Cuba decided in 1962, the CIA directly spent three million dollars to support the Christian Democrats during the electoral campaign, mostly through radio and print advertising aimed at raising the "Red Scare" again.

Eduardo Frei Montalva, who had been Minister of Public Works in 1945 in Juan Antonio Ríos's cabinet supported by the left-wing Democratic Alliance, and presidential candidate in 1958, was elected in this atmosphere, six years later, with the slogan "Revolución en Libertad" ("Revolution in Liberty"). He won 56% of the votes, defeating Allende who received 39% of the vote, while the right-wing Liberal-Conservative candidate Julio Durán obtained less than 5%. Frei was sworn in on November 3, 1964.

Frei's administration began many reforms in Chilean society. "Promoción Popular" (Social Promotion), "Reforma Agraria" (agrarian reform), "Reforma Educacional" (education reform), and "Juntas de Vecinos" (neighborhood associations) were some of his main projects. He also took measures to rationalise drug supply.

Furthermore, in 1966, the Rapa Nui of Easter Island gained full Chilean citizenship. Easter Island had been annexed in 1888 by Chile. However, until 1953 the island had been rented to the Williamson-Balfour Company as a sheep-farm, while the surviving Rapanui were confined to the settlement of Hanga Roa and the rest of the island managed by the Chilean Navy, until its opening to the public in 1966.

== See also ==
- Presidents of Chile timeline
