= Democratic Alliance of Chile =

The Democratic Alliance of Chile (Spanish: Alianza Democrática de Chile) was a coalition of left-wing parties from 1942 to 1946, which succeeded to the Popular Front headed by Pedro Aguirre Cerda's government (1938–1941). It included the Radical Party, the Socialist Party, the Communist Party, the Democratic Party, the National Falange and the Workers' Socialist Party (until June 1944, when its members integrated the Communist Party), and was also supported by the Confederación de Trabajadores de Chile (CTCH) trade-union. The coalition initial aim was to stand united before the 1942 presidential election, which were won by the Democratic Alliance's candidate, Juan Antonio Ríos, who formed a cabinet which was supported by the main parties of the Democratic Alliance. The coalition dissolved itself after the communists were outlawed by Gabriel Gonzalez Videla in 1947.

== See also ==
- Presidential Republic Era (1924-1973)
