= Juan Antonio Ríos =

Chilean political figure

Juan Antonio Ríos OMCh
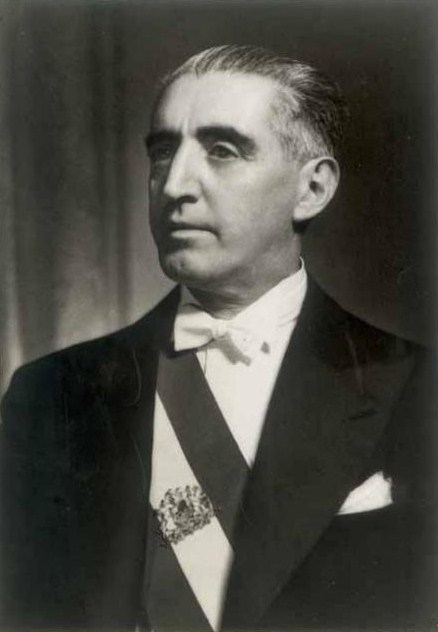
- Official portrait, 1942

24th President of Chile
- In office April 2, 1942 – June 27, 1946
- Preceded by: Jerónimo Méndez
- Succeeded by: Alfredo Duhalde

Member of the Chamber of Deputies for the 18th Departmental Grouping of Arauco y Cañete
- In office May 15, 1933 – May 15, 1937

Minister of Justice
- In office September 14 – October 3, 1932
- President: Bartolomé Blanche Espejo
- Preceded by: Guillermo Bañados Honorato
- Succeeded by: Absalón Valencia

Minister of the Interior
- In office June 17 – July 3, 1932
- President: Carlos Dávila Espinoza
- Preceded by: Arturo Ruiz Maffei
- Succeeded by: Eliseo Peña

Senator of the Republic of Chile for the 8th Provincial Grouping of Arauco, Malleco and Cautín
- In office May 15, 1930 – June 6, 1932
- Succeeded by: Congress dissolved

Member of the Chamber of Deputies for the 18th Departmental Grouping of Arauco, Lebu and Cañete
- In office 1925–1930
- In office May 15, 1924 – September 11, 1924
- Succeeded by: Congress dissolved

Personal details
- Born: November 10, 1888 Cañete, Chile
- Died: June 27, 1946 (aged 57) Santiago, Chile
- Party: Radical
- Spouse: Marta Ide Pereira (m. 1921)

Juan Antonio Ríos Morales (Latin American Spanish: [xwan anˈtonjo ˈri.os]; November 10, 1888 – June 27, 1946) was a Chilean political figure who served as president of Chile from 1942 to 1946, during the height of World War II. He died in office.

== Early life ==
Ríos was born at the Huichicura hacienda, near the town of Cañete, a coal-mining village in the Arauco Province of southern Chile. He was the youngest son of Anselmo Ríos, a rich landowner, and his third wife Lucinda Morales. His father (aged 69 to his young wife's 19 at marriage) died when he was very young so he and his three brothers were raised single-handedly by his mother. He completed his primary studies at the rural school of Cañete, and his secondary studies first at the Liceo of Lebu and later at the one in Concepción, and continued legal studies at the courses given at the annex of his school. Ríos became a lawyer in 1914 with an exposition on the creation and development of the police in Chile.

== Political rise ==
A member of the conservative wing of the Radical Party since his high school days, he was elected local president of the youth branch of that party and later city councillor. During the presidential election of 1920 he campaigned for Arturo Alessandri, being responsible for the southern part of the country. He was rewarded by Alessandri with the appointment of Consul-general and Chargé d'affaires to Panama. On October 21, 1921 he married Marta Ide, and they had three sons: Juan, Carlos, and Fernando.

Ríos returned to Chile in 1924, to run in that year's congressional elections. He was elected as deputy for Arauco, Lebu and Cañete, and was reelected in 1926. After Alessandri's return to power following the Chilean coup of 1925, he participated of the committee charged with drafting a new constitution, that led to the approval and proclamation of the 1925 Chilean Constitution.

In the meantime, Juan Antonio Ríos had become president and one of the principal leaders of the Radical Party. During the administration of colonel Carlos Ibáñez del Campo he was caught between his party's opposition to the government's dictatorial administration and his personal admiration for the government's results. As party president, he participated of the Thermal Congress (an unelected Congress convened by President Ibañez) as a senator for Arauco, Malleco, and Cautín. After the fall of general Ibañez in 1931, Ríos was expelled from his party for his cooperation with the former dictatorship.

The year 1932 was a very turbulent time politically for Ríos. First, he supported the Chilean coup of 1932, a successful coup that toppled President Juan Esteban Montero, and resulted in the proclamation of the Socialist Republic of Chile. Then he went on to become the Minister of the Interior when Carlos Dávila took over as head of state. In turn, after the resignation of Dávila three months later, general Bartolome Blanche became president, and Ríos became his Minister of Justice. Nonetheless, with the election of Arturo Alessandri in the presidential election of 1932 and the return to institutional normality, he was politically shunned.

Ríos ran as an independent in the congressional election of 1933 and was elected as deputy for Arauco and Cañete. That was the beginning of his political comeback. In 1935 he was welcomed back into the Radical fold. In 1937, the Radical Party, the Socialist Party, the Communist Party, the Democratic Party, and the Radical Socialist Party, as well as organizations such as the Confederación de Trabajadores de Chile (CTCH) trade union, the Mapuche movement which unified itself in the Frente Único Araucano, and the feminist Movimiento Pro-Emancipación de las Mujeres de Chile (MEMCh) allied themselves in the Popular Front (Spanish: Frente Popular), with Ríos becoming its first president. Nonetheless, Ríos was defeated in the internal presidential primaries by Pedro Aguirre Cerda, who got the nomination and then went on to win the presidential election of 1938.

During the Aguirre Cerda administration, Ríos was president of Chile's largest bank, the state-owned Caja de Credito Hipotecario, which made mortgage loans to Chilean farmers. He also sought to increase his political influence inside his party. His main political rival was Gabriel González Videla, but soon he managed to have him named ambassador to France, leaving him free to pursue his own political advancement. At the time it was rumored that President Aguirre Cerda had also offered him an ambassadorial position, but that he had answered: ... tell the President that I thank him for his offer, but I am moving up, not down.

=== 1942 presidential campaign ===
In 1941, due to his rapidly escalating illness, President Aguirre Cerda appointed his minister of the Interior, Jerónimo Méndez as vice-president and died soon after, on November 25, 1941. A presidential election was called for February 1, 1942. This was the opportunity Ríos had been waiting for and he immediately started to campaign. Nevertheless, two days before the internal primaries, Gabriel González Videla returned to Chile to oppose him for the nomination. The results were too close to call, so a tribunal of honor (electoral commission) was constituted, and Juan Antonio Ríos was finally proclaimed the candidate of the left-wings' coalition. This Democratic Alliance (Spanish: Alianza Democratica) was formed by the Radical Party, the Socialist Party, the Communist Party, the Democratic Party, and the Workers' Socialist Party.

The left-wings' coalition was united against a common opponent, General Carlos Ibáñez del Campo. Ríos was a member of the conservative wing of the Radical Party and defeated Ibáñez in the 1942 election, portraying himself as a conservative anti-fascist candidate. Ibáñez had the support of Chile's Conservative party, Liberal Party, National Socialist party, Popular Socialist Vanguard and the majority of the independents. Ríos obtained 55.95% of the votes and took office on April 2, 1942.

== Presidency ==
A clip shows the parade and celebration in Santiago as Chile joins the United Nations in 1943 as a member of the Allies.

Ríos' presidency was marked from the very beginning by parliamentary instability, caused by rivalries between the different political tendencies in his cabinet, and the renewed and increased influence of Congress. The Chilean Communist Party opposed Ríos because he had initially chosen neutrality in World War II and had refused to break off diplomatic relations with the Axis powers, while the right-wing accused him of complacency with the left. Economically, he faced labor unrest at home, brought about in large part by a drop in copper prices worldwide, while at the same time, the Chilean Socialist Party accused him of being too soft with big business and of failing to enact labour legislation protecting workers' rights.

=== Domestic affairs ===
Even though Ríos had been elected with the support of the Communist party, he refused the direct participation of this party in the government, thus earning their opposition. Ríos' option instead was to appoint "technical experts" and "personal friends" to cabinet and high-level government positions; this policy allowed him to include not only members of his own party, but also from the Conservative and Liberal opposition.

In 1943, Congress approved and Ríos signed the first constitutional reform to the 1925 constitution. This reform gave constitutional rank to the Comptroller General (Spanish: Contraloría General de la República) and limited the power of the President with respect to public expenditures without congressional approval.

In 1944, the Radical Party itself presented to Ríos a serie of propositions which he deemed unacceptable. Those included breaking-off diplomatic relations with Francoist Spain — diplomatic and especially economic pressure had caused him to finally break off relations with the Axis powers in January 1943 — the recognition of the USSR and a cabinet exclusively composed of Radicals. His refusal to implement the Radical Party's propositions, and the violent repression of riots that took place on Plaza Bulnes in Santiago, leading to several deaths, caused the resignation of all the Radical ministers, leaving the President without a party.

These internal divisions partly explain the right-wing parties success' during the 1945 legislative elections, which were a debacle for the Socialists and the Communists. The Radicals themselves lost a number of seats.

After his return from the United States, and faced with failing health, he transferred his presidential powers to his minister of the Interior Alfredo Duhalde (January 17, 1946) and died of cancer roughly 6 months later, on June 27.

=== Economic development ===
Ríos' administration — continuing the Aguirre Cerda policies — focused on the development of the steel, power and oil industries. To that effect, funds were channeled via the Production Development Corporation (Spanish: Corporación de Fomento de la Producción - CORFO), created under the previous administration.

Thus on January 17, 1944, it was created the National Electricity Company (Spanish: Empresa Nacional de Electricidad (Endesa)); on June 19 of 1950 the National Oil Company (Spanish: Empresa Nacional de Petróleos (ENAP)); and in 1942, the Pacific Steel Company (Spanish: Compañía de Aceros del Pacífico (CAP)), which opened the Huachipato steelworks next to the port of Talcahuano.

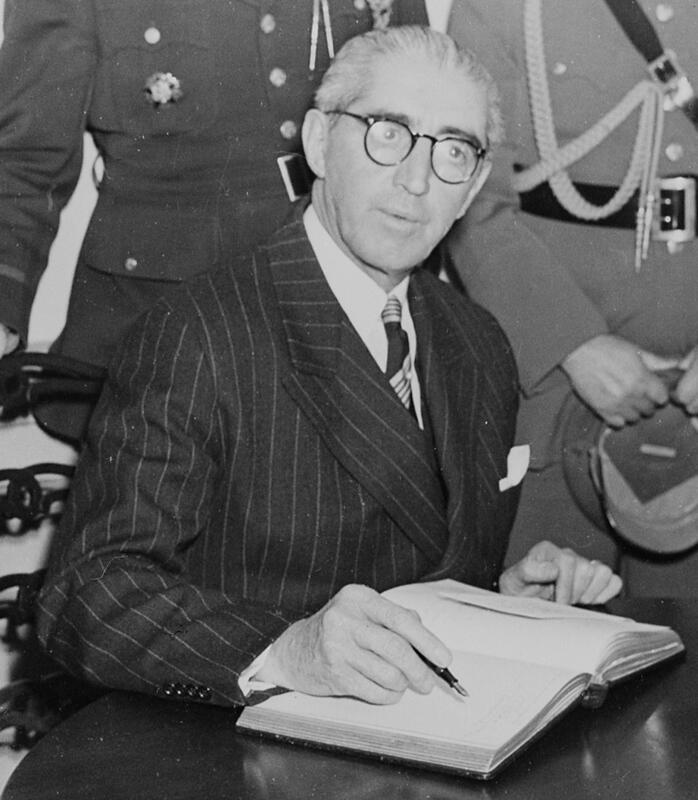
Visit to President Harry S. Truman at the White House, October 11, 1945

=== Foreign relations ===
Up to 1943, Chile and Argentina had declined to sever relations with the Axis powers, and the Chilean election was viewed by many as critical during World War II. A bitter disagreement sprung up between the president and its supporting Democratic Alliance. Initially, Ríos' government was committed to neutrality during the war, but the left-wing parties of his coalition were in favor of an immediate and total rupture with the Axis as well as for the recognition of the USSR, which they saw as their contribution to the world-struggle against fascism. Diplomatic and especially economic pressure from the United States finally caused him to break off relations with the Axis powers on January 20, 1943; however, he only declared war on Germany and Italy, and while beginning to imprison Japanese nationals did not declare war on Japan until 1945. By doing so, he made Chile eligible for the Lend-Lease program, and obtained the necessary loans to help along the economic recovery, and in 1945, Chile belonged to the victorious nations and had thus gained the right to participate in the postwar international conferences.

=== Death ===
President Ríos returned from his state visit and reassumed power on December 3, 1945; but by then he was already terminally ill with cancer. He transferred his presidential powers on January 17, 1946, to his Minister of the Interior, Alfredo Duhalde, who took over as vice-president. Juan Antonio Ríos spent his last days at Villa Paidahue, in La Reina, where he died on June 27, 1946, before the end of his constitutional period.

== See also ==
- 1946 Chilean presidential election
- Ciudad del Niño Presidente Juan Antonio Ríos
- René Ríos

Political offices
Preceded by Arturo Ruiz	Minister of the Interior; 1932	Succeeded by Eliseo Peña
Preceded by Guilermo Bañados Honorato	Minister of Justice; 1932	Succeeded by Absalón Valencia Zavala
Preceded by Jerónimo Méndez	President of Chile; 1942-1946	Succeeded by Alfredo Duhalde
