= Chilean Council of State =

Legislature of Chile (1976)

The Chilean Council of State (Spanish: Consejo de Estado) was a body set up in 1976 by the junta of General Augusto Pinochet in order to legitimise military rule. It produced a constitution which was approved in a 1980 plebiscite that had significant allegations of fraud.

The Council of State was created by Constitutional Act #1 (Spanish: Acta Constitutional No. 1) as a civilian advisory body for the military junta without any executive power. Former President Jorge Alessandri was appointed as its president, and Gabriel González Videla was also a member of the council.

The 1980 Chilean constitution was originally drafted by the Constituent Commission, then modified and ratified by the Council of State before being sent for the plebiscite.

== See also ==
- Politics of Chile
- Constitution of Chile
