= Rosa Markmann =

First Lady of Chile from 1946 to 1952

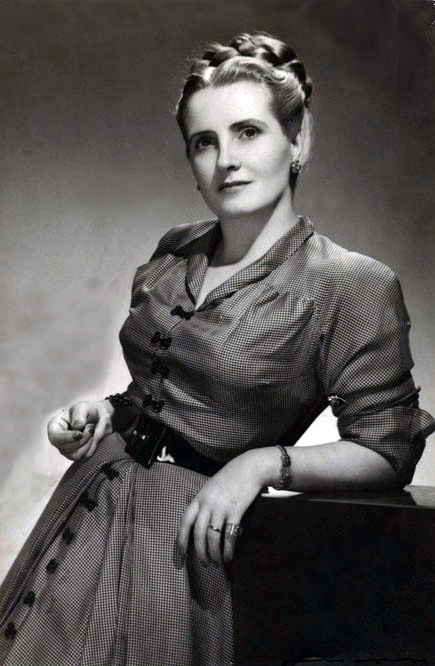

First Lady of Chile
- In role November 3, 1946 – November 3, 1952
- President: Gabriel González Videla
- Preceded by: Marta Ide Pereira
- Succeeded by: Graciela Letelier Velasco

Personal details
- Born: Rosa Markmann Reijer; July 30, 1907 Taltal, Chile
- Died: June 12, 2009 (aged 101) Santiago, Chile
- Spouse: Gabriel González Videla (m. 1926; died 1980)

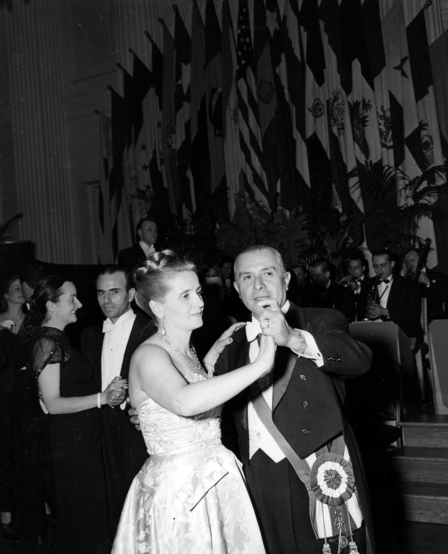
Rosa Markmann and her husband, President Gabriel González Videla.

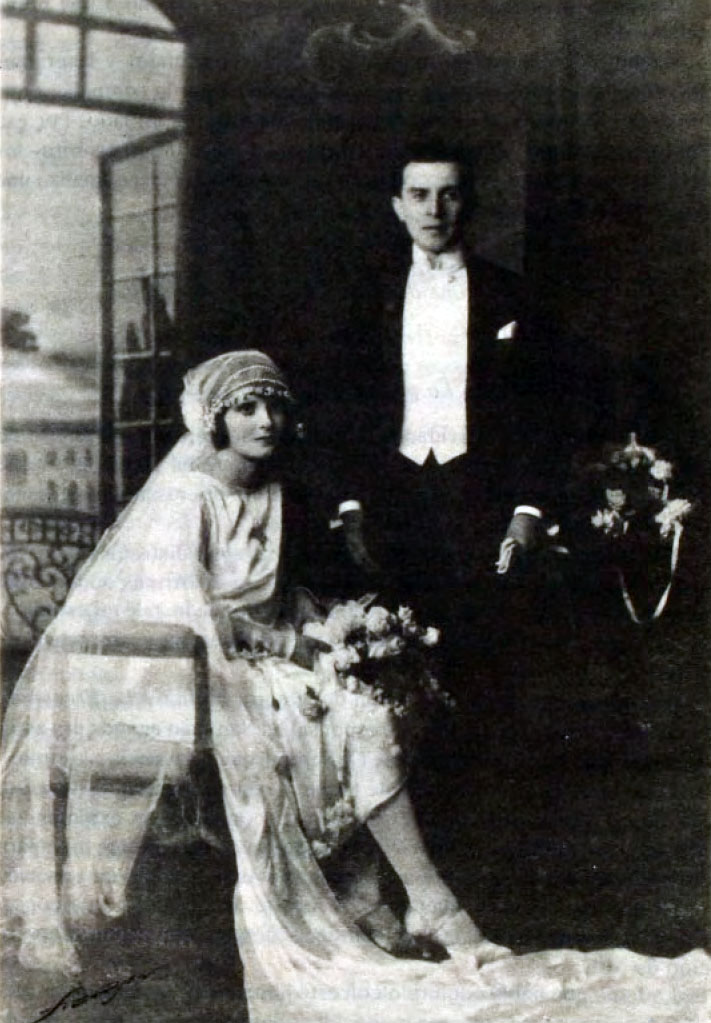
Photograph of Gabriel González Videla and Rosa Markmann's marriage (1926).

Rosa Markmann Reijer (July 30, 1907 – June 12, 2009) was the Chilean First Lady from 1946 to 1952, during the presidency of her husband, Gabriel González Videla.

== Biography ==
Known by her nickname "Mitty", Markmann was born in Taltal, Chile, from German descent, and her parents were the banker Ladislao Markmann and Ana Reijer. Her maternal grandfather was ambassador in Sweden. Rosa's great-grandfather is German.

She was married to González Videla until his death in 1980. During the presidency of her husband, she played a key role in the Chilean women's suffrage movement.

In 1947, Rosa Markmann announced the creation of the National Association of Housewives, whose chief purpose was to prevent speculation in basic subsistence goods among producers, distributors and retailers. Markmann then began to patronize a number of women's organizations and to express her support for female suffrage. In September 1948, she appeared at one of the events of FECHIF's (Chilean Federation of Feminine Institutions) "Pro-Women's Suffrage Week", assuring its participants that the President too favored women's suffrage.

During her husband's presidency, Rosa became a fashion symbol for women all over the country, nicknamed "The Chilean Eva Perón".

She was a passionate supporter of the military government of General Augusto Pinochet.

Markmann died, 101 years old, on June 12, 2009, in her mansion in Las Condes, Santiago de Chile.

== Notes ==
Honorary titles
Preceded by Marta Ide Pereira	First Lady of Chile; 1946—1952	Succeeded by Graciela Letelier Velasco
