= Democratic Party (Chile) =

Democratic Party Partido Democrático
- Founded: 1932
- Dissolved: 1960
- Split from: Democrat Party
- Merged into: National Democratic Party
- Headquarters: Santiago de Chile
- Political position: Centre-left

The Democratic Party (Partido Democrático) of Chile was a Chilean political party created by a left-wing faction of the Democrat Party in 1932. It was created by a leftist faction of the Democrat Party, which opposed the right-wing group that officially supported the government of Arturo Alessandri.

Although they supported the presidential candidacy of Alessandri, eventually became opponents. In 1937, they joined the Popular Front and supported the candidacy of Pedro Aguirre Cerda. In 1941, they merged with the Democrat Party.

In the 1940s again were divided in the Democratic Party of Chile and the People's Democratic Party. Both parties were reunited in 1956. The party was dissolved in 1960, when meeting with other organizations to form the National Democratic Party (PADENA).

== Presidential candidates ==
The following is a list of the presidential candidates supported by the Democratic Party.

- 1932: Arturo Alessandri (won)
- 1938: Pedro Aguirre Cerda (won)
- 1942: Juan Antonio Ríos (won)
- 1946: Gabriel González Videla (won)
- 1952: People's Democratic: Carlos Ibáñez (won), Democratic of Chile: Pedro Alfonso (lost)
- 1958: Salvador Allende (lost)
