= Gabriel González Videla =

Chilean politician (1898–1980)

Gabriel González Videla OMCh
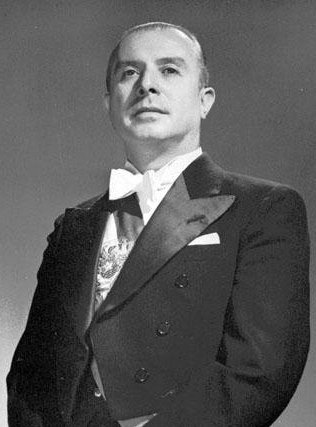
- Official portrait, 1946

25th President of Chile
- In office 3 November 1946 – 3 November 1952
- Preceded by: Juan Antonio Iribarren
- Succeeded by: Carlos Ibáñez del Campo

Senator of the Republic of Chile
- In office 15 May 1945 – 3 November 1946
- Preceded by: Leonardo Guzmán Cortés
- Succeeded by: Ángel Custodio Vásquez
- Constituency: 1st Provincial Grouping

Vice President of the Council of State
- In office 9 January 1976 – 1980

Personal details
- Born: 22 November 1898 La Serena, Chile
- Died: 22 August 1980 (aged 81) Santiago, Chile
- Resting place: Municipal Cemetery of La Serena; La Serena, Chile
- Party: Radical (until 1971)
- Spouse: Rosa Markmann Reijer (m. 1926)
- Children: Silvia; Rosita; Gabriel
- Parent(s): Gabriel González Castillo; Teresa Videla Zepeda
- Relatives: Coco Legrand (nephew); Alfonso Campos Menéndez (son-in-law)
- Education: University of Chile; University of Paris
- Occupation: Politician; lawyer
- Awards: Military Order of Christ, Grand Cross (Portugal); Legion of Honour, Commander (France)
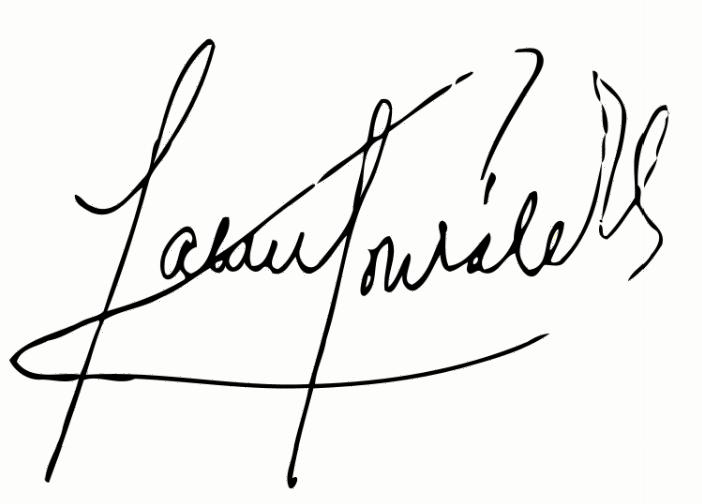
- Signature

Gabriel Enrique González Videla (Latin American Spanish: [ɡaˈβɾjel ɣonˈsales βiˈðela]; 22 November 1898 – 22 August 1980) was a Chilean politician and lawyer who served as the 25th president of Chile from 1946 to 1952. He had previously been a member of the Chamber of Deputies from 1930 to 1941 and senator for Tarapacá and Antofagasta from 1945 to 1946. A long-time member and leader in the Radical Party, he left the party in 1971 over its support for socialist president Salvador Allende. From 1973 until his death in 1980 he became an active participant in the government of Augusto Pinochet, acting as vice president of the Council of State from 1976 onwards. As vice president of the council, he helped draft the current Chilean constitution of 1980.

== Early life ==
González was born in the coastal city of La Serena on 22 November 1898, to parents Gabriel González Castillo and Teresa Videla Zepeda. He was the oldest of eighteen children. After graduating from the Liceo de La Serena, González went on to study law at the University of Chile. He graduated in 1922, the same year his father became paralyzed. As a result of his father's paralysis, González returned to La Serena to help his family. He became a freemason in 1924.

In 1915, González joined the youth wing of the Radical Party, later becoming a member of the Radical Assembly of La Serena. González was involved in protests against the military government established in 1924 by Luis Altamirano. In 1927, he made declarations against President Carlos Ibáñez and had to go into hiding. Once Ibáñez's government fell in 1931, González was able to resume his political activities and was president of the Radical Party from 1931 to 1937.

González was elected deputy for the district comprising La Serena, Coquimbo, Elqui, Ovalle, Combarbalá, and Illapel in 1930. However, the coup led by socialist Marmaduque Grove in 1932 dissolved Congress. González was once again elected deputy for this same area in 1933 and reelected in 1937. In 1939 he resigned because President Pedro Aguirre Cerda named him ambassador to France first, then to Portugal (1940), and finally to Brazil (1942).

=== 1942 presidential campaign ===
In 1941, due to his rapidly escalating illness, President Aguirre Cerda appointed his minister of the Interior, Jerónimo Méndez as vice-president and died soon after, on 25 November 1941. Presidential elections were called for 1 February 1942. Two days before the internal primaries of the Radical Party, Gabriel González Videla, who represented the Radical Party's more leftist faction, returned to Chile to dispute the nomination to Juan Antonio Ríos. The results were too close to call, so a tribunal of honor (electoral commission) was constituted, and Juan Antonio Ríos was finally proclaimed the candidate of the left-wing coalition.

This Democratic Alliance (Spanish: Alianza Democratica) was formed by the Radical Party, the Socialist Party, the Communist Party, the Democratic Party and the Workers' Socialist Party. Ríos went on to win the general election with 56% of the votes and took office on 2 April.

In 1945, González Videla was elected senator for the provinces of Tarapacá and Antofagasta and represented Chile at the United Nations conference in San Francisco.

=== 1946 presidential campaign ===
González Videla finally won the Radical Party primaries in 1946. He attempted to revive the Democratic Alliance that brought Juan Antonio Ríos to power in 1942 but was unsuccessful in this endeavor, as the Socialist Party denounced the offer of alliance, refused to join and the popular front could not be reconstituted. In the end, González only gained a plurality with the support of his own Radical Party and the Communist Party.

In the presidential elections, González won 40% of the vote, defeating right-wing candidates Eduardo Cruz-Coke and Fernando Alessandri and socialist Bernardo Ibáñez. Since González did not reach the necessary 50%, the election went to Congress. He was duly confirmed on October 24 that year.

== Presidency ==
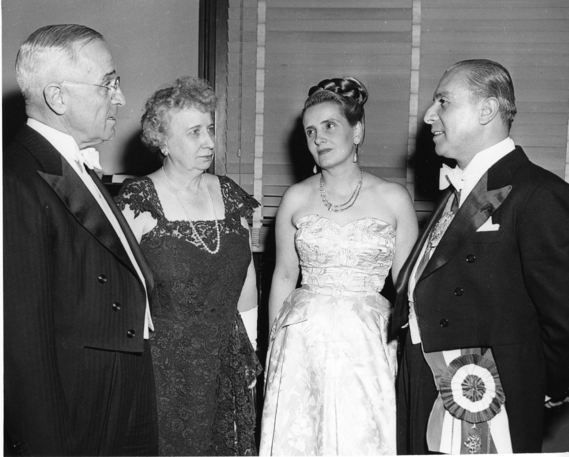
President Gonzalez, with his wife Rosa Markmann and Harry S. Truman and Mrs Truman

Gabriel González Videla's first cabinets, between 1946 and 1948, included Communist ministers; but the international Cold War and Chile's internal troubles soon pushed González Videla toward the right. Chile quickly became enmeshed in the Cold War, as Moscow and especially Washington meddled in its affairs. That friction resulted in the splitting of the CTCh (the Worker's union) in 1946 into Communist and Socialist branches and then the outlawing of the Communist Party. The Socialists were now opposed to the Communists and aligned with the American Federation of Labor-Congress of Industrial Organizations (AFL-CIO) having grown closer to United States labor interests during World War II.

Once in the presidency, González Videla had a fallout with his Communist allies. They demanded more cabinet seats, which González Videla refused to grant. The Communist Party then withdrew their support for him. In response, he first expelled them from his cabinet and then banned them completely under the 1948 Law of Permanent Defense of Democracy (Spanish: Ley de Defensa Permanente de la Democracia), which banned communist and like-minded parties. He also broke relations with the Soviet Union and Warsaw Pact countries. Many key communist figures decided to flee the country, including poet Pablo Neruda, who had decried González Videla on the Senate Floor for "selling out to the United States." The communists that remained were arrested, but were not subjected to torture or execution. A pro-communist miners' strike in Lota was brutally suppressed. Demonstrations against what the communists called la ley maldita ("the damned law") led to the declaration of martial law, but were successfully repressed.

In 1948, González Videla also learned of a plot by some members of the Armed Forces to lead a coup against him and install Carlos Ibáñez as president. He immediately ordered an investigation and the arrest of the coup leaders, including the head of the operation, General Ramón Vergara. Ibáñez, however, was absolved of all responsibility. This plan became known as the Pig trotters' plot (Spanish: Complot de las patitas de chancho), because the coup leaders met in a restaurant which specialized in this Chilean dish.

After outlawing the Communists, he ruled with the support of the two right-wing parties, the conservatives and the liberals, which approved of his anti-communist stance. He constructed a new cabinet made up of conservatives, liberals, radicals, some socialists, and members of the small Democratic Party. The Communist Party remained illegal until 1958.

Controversy still swirls around the reasons for his aboutface. According to González Videla and his sympathizers, the repression of the Communists was necessary to thwart their plots against his government, but no evidence has been found to substantiate that claim. According to the Communists and other critics of González Videla, he acted under pressure from the United States and out of a desire to forge closer economic and military bonds with the dominant superpower. Historians have established that the president wanted to appease the United States, the United States encouraged a crackdown on Chilean Communists, and the US government appreciated González Videla's actions and thereafter expanded the scope of its loans, investments, and technical missions to Chile. The US and Chile also agreed to a military assistance pact while González Videla was president. However, no conclusive evidence has come to light that the US directly pushed him to act.

Although González Videla feared Communist intentions and respected the wishes of the US government, he also turned against the PCCh for other reasons. He hoped to mollify right-wing critics of his government, especially landowners to whom he guaranteed a continuing moratorium on peasant unionization. He sought to remove any ideological justification for a military coup. He also wanted to weaken the labor movement in a time of economic uncertainties, slow growth, and rising inflation while the PCCh was promoting strikes. González Videla's banning of the Communists coincided with his movement away from social reform in favor of the promotion of industrial growth.

Economic links with the United States, which had grown after the economic crisis of the 1930s, were strengthened after World War II; U.S. investments in Chile increased from $414,000,000 in 1945 to $540,000,000 in 1950, largely in copper production. By 1952 the United States had loaned $342,000,000 to the Chilean government. The exchange of technicians and professors helped tighten technical and cultural links between the two countries.

The presidency of González Videla saw the strong political recovery of the right. Between 1940 and 1952, Chile's population rose from 5,000,000 to 6,350,000, with the strongest increase in urban areas, which accounted for 52 percent of the total population in 1940 and 60 percent in 1952. Production rose by a rate very close to the rise in population. Social inequities were not reduced significantly, however, although some reforms were carried out, with social security extended to more Chileans, and women granted the right to vote in 1949.

In the parliamentary elections of 1949, the pro-government parties triumphed. However, the unity between right-wing parties and radicals and socialists did not last long. Radicals were unhappy with the economic policies of the right-wing Finance Minister, Jorge Alessandri, no matter how successful they were in controlling inflation. When a protest by government employees broke out in 1950, the radicals immediately declared their support for the protesters' demands. The right-wingers responded by resigning from González's cabinet.

By losing both liberal and conservative support, González lost the pro-government majority in Congress. He was unable to achieve much thereafter, but he managed to make significant improvements on women's rights. González's cabinet had the first woman minister in Latin America (Adriana Olguín), and he appointed the first woman ambassador and created the Oficina de la Mujer.

In foreign policy, González reinforced Chile's territorial claim to part of Antarctica by becoming the first head of state to visit the continent in February 1948 and by establishing a military base there that same year. The Chilean Gonzalez Videla Antarctic Base is named after him.

== Retirement and death ==
After his term ended in 1952, his name was mentioned in the party primaries in 1958, though he announced he would not seek the presidency. In 1964, he actively campaigned for radical presidential candidate Julio Durán, who was also anti-communist. González's influence in a now more left-leaning Radical Party was decreasing, and in 1971 he resigned from the party, angered by its support for socialist Salvador Allende. González undertook a significant role in the opposition to Allende and supported Augusto Pinochet's 1973 coup which deposed Allende.

González was vice president of the Council of State which drafted a new Constitution of Chile during Pinochet's presidency. When his work there was finished, González completely retired from politics and died of cardiac arrest on 22 August 1980, in Santiago.

Diplomatic posts
New title	Head of the Chilean Delegation to the United Nations; 1945–1946	Succeeded by Hernán Santa Cruz as Permanent Representative
Political offices
Preceded by Juan Antonio Iribarren	President of Chile; 1946–1952	Succeeded by Carlos Ibáñez del Campo
