= Communist Party of Chile =

Communist Party of Chile Partido Comunista de Chile
- Abbreviation: PCCh
- President: Lautaro Carmona Soto
- Secretary-General: Bárbara Figueroa
- Chief of Deputies: Lorena Pizarro
- Chief of Senators: Claudia Pascual
- Founded: 4 June 1912; 114 years ago
- Headquarters: Vicuña Mackenna 31; Santiago
- Newspaper: El Siglo
- Youth wing: Communist Youth of Chile
- Membership (2026): 44,686 (3rd)
- Ideology: Communism; Left-wing populism; Marxism–Leninism
- Political position: Left-wing to far-left
- National affiliation: Unidad por Chile (since 2022) Formerly: Revolutionary Convention (1912–1921); Revolutionary Movement (1921–1924); Socialist-Republican Covenant (1925–1930); Popular Front (1937–1941); Democratic Alliance (1942–1947); People's National Front (1951–1956); Popular Action Front (1956–1969); Popular Unity (1969–1981); People's Democratic Movement (1983–1987); Juntos Podemos Más (2003–2011); New Majority (2013–2018); Unity for Change (2019–2020); Chile Digno (2020–2022); Apruebo Dignidad (2021–2023)
- Regional affiliation: São Paulo Forum
- International affiliation: IMCWP; Comintern (1922–1943)
- Colours: Red; Yellow
- Chamber of Deputies: 10 / 155
- Senate: 2 / 50

Party flag

Website
- www.pcchile.cl

The Communist Party of Chile (Spanish: Partido Comunista de Chile, PCCh) is a Marxist-Leninist party in Chile. It was founded in 1912 as the Socialist Workers' Party (Partido Obrero Socialista) and adopted its current name in 1922. The party established a youth wing, the Communist Youth of Chile (Juventudes Comunistas de Chile, JJ.CC), in 1932.

== History ==
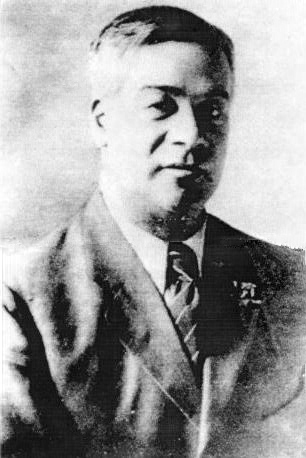
Luis Emilio Recabarren, Communist Party of Chile leader and founder (1912–1924)

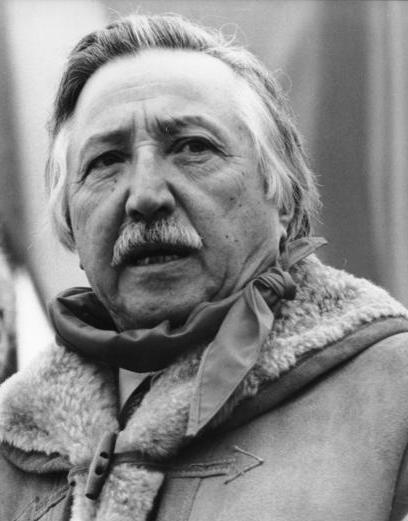
Luis Corvalán, Secretary-General of the PCCh (1958–1990)

The PCCh was founded on 4 June 1912 by Luis Emilio Recabarren, after he left the Democrat Party. The party was initially known as the Socialist Workers' Party, before adopting its current name on 2 January 1922.

It achieved congressional representation shortly thereafter and played a leading role in the development of the Chilean labor movement.

The party was founded as Chile began to industrialize. In the 1920s, the nitrate industry was booming, and many of its workers were among the first communists. The movement then gained momentum within the coal, textile, and port unions.

Closely tied to the Soviet Union and the Third International, the PCCh participated in the Popular Front (Frente Popular) government of 1938, growing rapidly among the unionized working class in the 1940s. It then participated to the Popular Front's successor, the Democratic Alliance.

Concern over the PCCh's success at building a strong electoral base, combined with the onset of the Cold War, led to its being outlawed in 1948 by a Radical government, a status it had to endure for almost a decade until 1958 when it was again legalized. By the 1960s, the party had become a veritable political subculture, with its own symbols and organizations and the support of prominent artists and intellectuals such as Pablo Neruda, the Nobel Prize-winning poet, and Violeta Parra, the songwriter and folk artist. At the time, the U.S. State Department estimated the party membership to be approximately 27,500.

It later came to power along with the Socialist Party in the Unidad Popular ("Popular Unity") coalition in 1970. Within the broad Unidad Popular alliance, the communists sided with Allende, a relative moderate from the Socialist Party, and other more moderate forces of that coalition, supporting more gradual reforms and urging to find a compromise with the Christian Democrats. This line was opposed by more radically leftist factions of the Socialist Party and smaller far-left groups. The party was outlawed after the 1973 coup d'état that deposed President Salvador Allende. Much of the Communist leadership went underground, and for a while the party's moderation continued even after the coup had taken place. Also, it has been argued by Mark Ensalaco that crushing the Communist Party was not a top priority for the military junta. In its first statement after the coup, the party leadership still argued that the coup could succeed because the Unidad Popular was too isolated, due to actions of the 'far-left'. Around 1977, the party changed direction. The Communist Party set up a guerrilla organization, the Manuel Rodríguez Patriotic Front. With the restoration of democracy and the election of a new president in 1990, the Communist Party of Chile was legalized again.

As part of the Popular Unity coalition the PCCh advocated a broad alliance; however, it swung sharply to the left after the 1973 coup, regretting the failure to issue arms to the working class and pursuing an armed struggle against Pinochet's regime. Since the restoration of democracy it has acted independently of its previous partners. Between 1983 and 1987 it was a member of the People's Democratic Movement.

Under Pinochet's regime, around 500 of its members were murdered.

In the 1999/2000 presidential elections, the party announced Gladys Marín as their presidential candidate, becoming Marin as the first female candidate to contest the first round of a presidential election in Chile, alongside Sara Larraín. Marín won 3.2% of the vote in the first round.

At the 2005 legislative election, 11 December 2005, the party won 5.1% of the popular vote, but as a result of Chile's binomial electoral rules, no seats. The small but significant support of the PCCh is believed to have aided in the electoral victories of former socialist president Ricardo Lagos in the 2000 elections, and in the more recent victory of Chile's first female president, the socialist Michelle Bachelet in January 2006, both of whom won in competitive second round runoffs.

From 2013 to 2018, the PCCh was a member of New Majority (Spanish: Nueva Mayoría), a leftist coalition led by Michelle Bachelet.

== Political positioning ==
The Communist Party of Chile is considered a moderate and reformist party compared to some other communist parties. It has never sought to overthrow the Chilean democratic system, nor has it supported insurrectionary movements, nor has it been entirely subordinate to the Soviet Union. It embodies "Chilean-style communism: institutional, orderly, and open to dialogue."

== Controversies ==
The PCCh faced criticism from several parties in Chile after congratulating Venezuelan president Nicolás Maduro on his party's victory in the 2020 parliamentary election. Prominent members of the Party for Democracy, Radical Party, and Socialist Party questioned the PCCh's praise of the election as "flawless", echoing criticisms from opposition parties in Venezuela that the election was neither free nor fair. However, some of its leaders have also publicly condemned the human rights abuses that have taken place in Venezuela under the government of Nicolás Maduro.

== Leaders ==
Leaders of the Communist Party of Chile
General Secretary	Period	President	Period
Ramón Sepúlveda Leal	1922–1924	Non-existent position	
Luis A. González	?–?	Non-existent position	
Galvarino Gil	?–?	Non-existent position	
Maclovio Galdames	?–?	Non-existent position	
José Santos Zavala	?–?	Non-existent position	
Isaias Iriarte	?–1929	Non-existent position	
Carlos Contreras Labarca	1931–1946	Non-existent position	
Ricardo Fonseca	1946–1948	Non-existent position	
Oyarzun Galo González	1948–1958	Non-existent position	
Oyarzun Galo González	1948–1958	Elías Lafertte	1956–1961
Luis Corvalán	1958–1990	Elías Lafertte	1956–1961
Luis Corvalán	1958–1990	Non-existent position	
Volodia Teitelboim	1990–1994	Non-existent position	
Gladys Marín	1994–2002	Non-existent position	
Guillermo Teillier	2002–2005	Gladys Marín	2002–2005
Lautaro Carmona Soto	2005–2023	Guillermo Teillier	2005–2023
Bárbara Figueroa	2023–present	Lautaro Carmona Soto	2023–present

== Election results ==
=== Chamber of Deputies and Senate elections ===
Election	Votes	%	Chamber seats	Votes	%	Senate seats	Status
1918	1,548	0.64%	0 / 118				Extra-parliamentary
1921	4,814	2.16%	2 / 118				Opposition
1924	1,212	0.49%	0 / 118				Extra-parliamentary
1925	as part of USRACh		7 / 132	as part of USRACh		3 / 45	Opposition
1937	17,162	4.16%	6 / 146	7,543	—	1 / 45	Popular Front government
1941	53,114	11.80%	16 / 147	28,449	12.18%	4 / 45	Popular Front government
1945	46,133	10.18%	15 / 147	—		5 / 45	Coalition (1945–1948)
1945	46,133	10.18%	15 / 147	—		5 / 45	Banned (1948-1958)
1949	5,721	1.25%	1 / 147				Opposition
1953	38,371	4.93%	2 / 147				Opposition
1957	as part of FRAP		6 / 147				Opposition
1961	157,572	11.76%	16 / 147	74,838	12.21%	4 / 45	Opposition
1965	290,635	12.73%	18 / 147	142,088	10.73%	6 / 45	Opposition
1969	383,049	16.60%	22 / 150	181,488	18.04%	6 / 50	Opposition (1969–1970)
1969	383,049	16.60%	22 / 150	181,488	18.04%	6 / 50	Coalition (1970–1973)
1973	593,738	16.36%	25 / 150	380,460	17.29%	9 / 50	Coalition
1973 Chilean coup d'état
1989	as part of PAIS		0 / 120	as part of PAIS		0 / 38	Extra-parliamentary
1993	336,034	4.99%	0 / 120	65,073	3.47%	0 / 38	Extra-parliamentary
1997	398,588	6.88%	0 / 120	357,825	8.44%	0 / 38	Extra-parliamentary
2001	320,688	5.22%	0 / 120	45,735	2.64%	0 / 38	Extra-parliamentary
2005	339,547	5.14%	0 / 120	104,687	2.19%	0 / 38	Extra-parliamentary
2009	132,305	2.02%	3 / 120	Did not participate		0 / 38	Opposition
2013	255,242	4.11%	6 / 120	6,423	0.14%	0 / 38	Coalition
Changes to electoral system in 2017
2017	274,935	4.58%	8 / 155	20,217	1.21%	0 / 43	Opposition
2021	464,885	7.35%	12 / 155	335,673	7.21%	2 / 50	Coalition
2025	538,793	5.03%	11 / 155	258,229	8.34%	3 / 50	Opposition

=== Presidential election ===
Keys

- RP = supported a candidate from the Radical Party
- SP = supported a candidate from the Socialist Party
- PU–SP = member of the Popular Unity coalition, supported the candidate from the Socialist Party
- PDC = supported a candidate from the Christian Democratic Party
- Ind = supported an independent candidate
- HP = supported a candidate from the Humanist Party
- NM–SP = member of the New Majority coalition, supported the candidate from the Socialist Party
- NM–Ind = member of the New Majority coalition, supported an independent candidate
- AD-SC = member of the Apruebo Dignidad coalition, supported the candidate from Social Convergence

Presidential
Year	Nominee	No. of votes	% of votes
1920	Luis Emilio Recabarren	681	0.41%
1925	José Santos Salas	74,091	28.4%
1927	None	—	—
1931	Elías Lafertte	2,434	0.9%
1932	Elías Lafertte	4,128	1.2%
1938	Pedro Aguirre Cerda (RP)	222,720	50.5%
1942	Juan Antonio Ríos (RP)	260,034	56.0%
1946	Gabriel González Videla (RP)	192,207	40.2%
1952	Salvador Allende (SP)	51,975	5.5%
1958	Salvador Allende (SP)	356,493	28.9%
1964	Salvador Allende (SP)	977,902	38.9%
1970	Salvador Allende (PU–SP)	1,070,334	36.61%
1989	Patricio Aylwin (PDC)	3,850,571	55.17%
1993	Eugenio Pizarro (Ind)	327,402	4.70%
1999	Gladys Marín	225,224	3.19%
2005	Tomás Hirsch (HP)	375,048	5.40%
2009	Jorge Arrate	433,195	6.21%
2013	Michelle Bachelet (NM–SP)	3,466,358	62.15%
2017	Alejandro Guillier (NM–Ind)	3,157,750	45.42%
2021	Gabriel Boric (AD–SC)	4,620,890	55.87%
2025	Jeannette Jara	5,218,444	41.84%

== See also ==
- Communist Youth of Chile
- Luis Emilio Recabarren
- Popular Unity
- Co-ordinating Committee of Communist Parties in Britain
- Juntos PODEMOS Más
- Norte Grande insurrection
