= Popular Front (Chile) =

Popular Front Frente Popular
- Leader: Pedro Aguirre Cerda
- President: Marmaduke Grove
- Founded: 6 May 1937
- Dissolved: 16 February 1941
- Succeeded by: Democratic Alliance of Chile
- Headquarters: Santiago
- Ideology: Democratic socialism Radicalism; Social democracy Social liberalism Communism; Anti-clericalism; Christian socialism
- Political position: Left-wing; Factions: Centre-left to far-left
- Colours: Red

The Popular Front (Spanish: Frente Popular) in Chile was an electoral and political left-wing coalition from 1937 to February 1941, during the Presidential Republic era (1924–1973). It gathered together the Radical Party, the Socialist Party, the Communist Party, the Democratic Party and the Radical Socialist Party, as well as organizations such as the Confederación de Trabajadores de Chile (CTCH) trade-union, the Mapuche movement which unified itself in the Frente Único Araucano, and the feminist Movimiento Pro-Emancipación de las Mujeres de Chile (MEMCh).

The Popular Front was the first of several centre-left governments that would lead Chile until 1952.

== Formation of the Popular Front ==
Since 1935, the Communist Party advocated a popular front strategy, in agreement with the Comintern's directions and in hope of succeeding in winning elections as in Spain and France. With this aim in mind, the Communist Party toned down its revolutionary discourse, advocating compromise with "bourgeois democracy" and supporting industrial development of the country. On the other hand, the Socialist Party remained skeptical towards such an alliance, and entered the Popular Front only when the electoral victory of the right-wing candidate, Gustavo Ross, seemed inescapable.

The Popular Front presented the Radical Pedro Aguirre Cerda as their common candidate for the 1938 presidential election. He narrowly defeated the right-wing candidate. Following Cerda's death in 1941, the left-wing coalition developed into the Democratic Alliance which united the same parties for the 1942 presidential election.

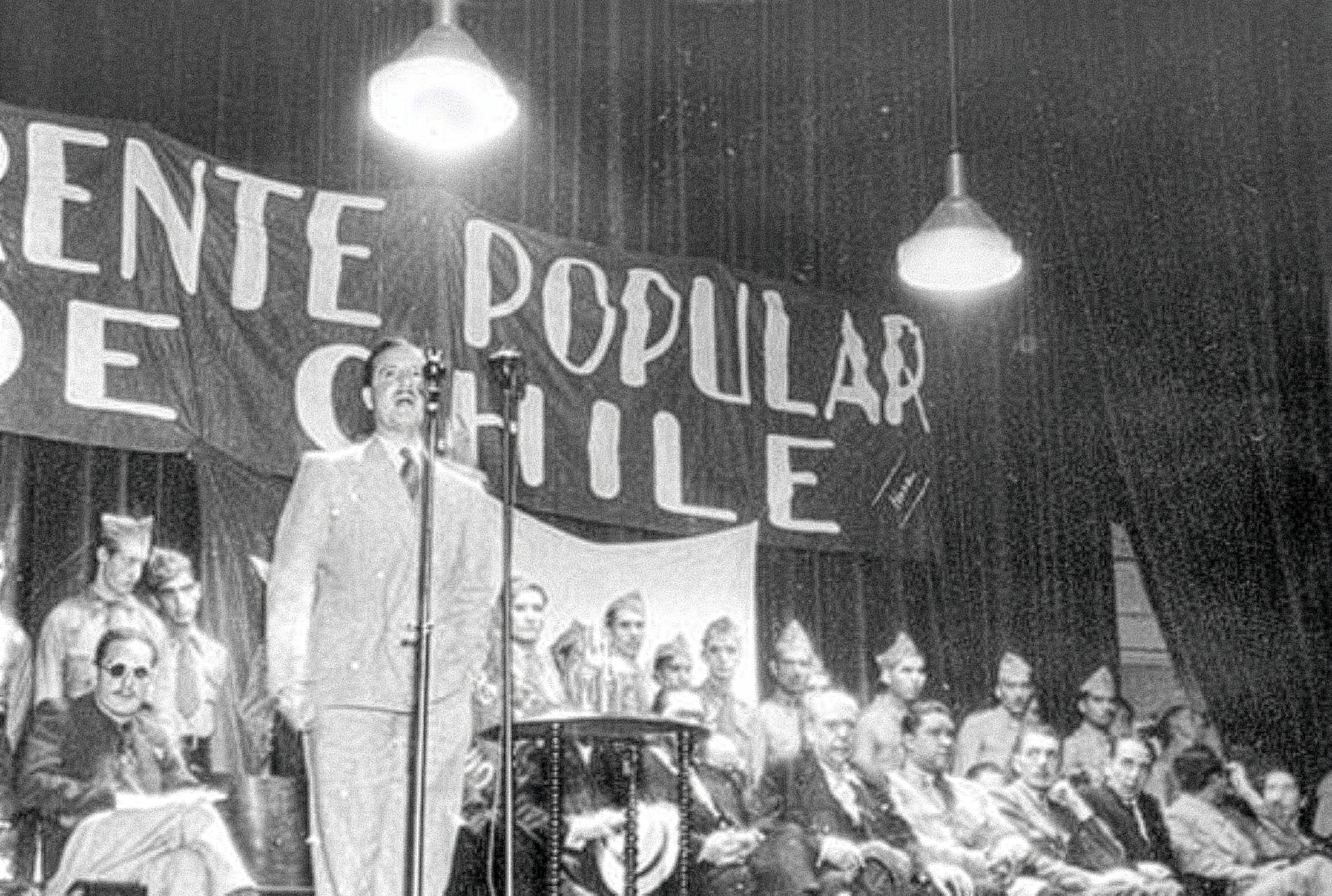
Senator Salvador Allende speaks during the Anniversary of the Popular Front, at the Caupolicán Theater (May 6, 1939)

The presidential candidate for 1938 was designed during the Convención Presidencial de Izquierdas (Presidential Convention of the Left) on 15–17 April 1938 in the National Congress. 400 delegates of the Radical parties, 330 Socialists, 120 Communists, 120 members of the Democratic Party and 60 from the CTCH trade-union attended the convention. Initially, none of the proposed candidates obtained the required majority of 684 votes out of 1,030.

On the first two days, Aguirre Cerda won 520 votes (Radicals and Democrats), Marmaduke Grove 360 (Socialists and parts of the CTCH) and Elías Lafertte 150 (Communists and parts of the CTCH). In the same time, the Extraordinary General Congress of the Socialist Party was being held, during which it was decided to withdraw Marmaduqe Grove's candidacy and to support Aguirre Cerda.

== Government of the Popular Front ==
The Popular Front created the CORFO after the 1939 earthquake, which launched public works schemes, etc. Pedro Aguirre Cerda also nominated Pablo Neruda as Special Consul in Paris for immigration, and the latter organized the journey of the SS Winnipeg, which brought to Chile 2,200 Spanish Republican refugees. The Popular Front also implemented its education program by building 1,000 primary schools and creating 3,000 offices for teachers. Several reforms in other areas were also carried out, such as in social security, public health, education, and worker's rights.

The Popular Front was supported by artists such as Neruda, Gabriela Mistral or the Surrealist collective La Mandrágora, created in 1938 by Teófilo Cid, Enrique Gómez-Correa and Braulio Arenas. The Proletarian Novelist group of the Generation of 1938 also were great supporters of the Popular Front, and included the novelists Nicomedes Guzmán, Óscar Castro, Volodia Teitelboim, Juan Godoy and others.

=== Leaders ===
- President: Pedro Aguirre Cerda
- Minister of Health: Salvador Allende
- President of Popular Front: Marmaduke Grove

== Composition ==
Party	Ideology
Radical Party; Partido Radical	Radicalism
Socialist Party of Chile; Partido Socialista de Chile	Democratic socialism
Communist Party of Chile; Partido Comunista de Chile	Communism
Democratic Party; Partido Democrático	Populism
Socialist Radical Party; Partido Radical Socialista	Democratic socialism

== See also ==
- Popular front
- Popular Unity, the left-wing coalition for the 1970 presidential election.
