= Fernando Alessandri =

Chilean politician

President of the Senate of Chile
- In office 6 September 1950 – 8 April 1958
- Preceded by: Arturo Alessandri Palma
- Succeeded by: Guillermo Pérez de Arce

Member of the Senate
- In office 9 May 1934 – 15 May 1969
- Preceded by: Aurelio Núñez
- Constituency: Tarapacá and Antofagasta Province

Personal details
- Born: 21 May 1897 Santiago, Chile
- Died: 27 March 1982 (aged 84) Santiago, Chile
- Party: Liberal Party (1920−1966)
- Spouse(s): Olga Lyon (div.); Juanita Izquierdo
- Children: 1
- Parent(s): Arturo Alessandri; Rosa Rodríguez
- Education: University of Chile (LL.B)
- Occupation: Politician
- Profession: Lawyer

Fernando Alessandri Rodríguez (21 May 1897 – 28 March 1982) was a Chilean political figure, candidate of the centre-right in Chile's 1946 presidential election.

He was the son of Arturo Alessandri, who was president from 1920 to 1925 and again from 1932 to 1938, and brother of Jorge Alessandri Rodríguez, who was president from 1958 to 1964.

== Biography ==
Alessandri was born in Santiago, the son of Arturo Alessandri Palma and of Rosa Ester Rodríguez. He completed his early studies at the Instituto Nacional, and later graduated as a lawyer from the Universidad de Chile on October 18, 1919.

He became professor of procedural law at the same university in 1922, and in 1924, he married Olga Lyon Vial, with whom he had one son, Fernando, who died at the age of three. After the death of his first wife he married for second time in 1954, to Juanita Izquierdo Huneeus, who survived him.

== Career ==
He joined the Liberal party in 1920, and participated actively in the Chilean presidential election of 1920 that was won by his father, Arturo Alessandri. During this first presidency of his father, he acted as the Secretary of the Presidency. As a lawyer he also drafted the project that eventually became the Organic Code of Chilean Tribunals.

He was always very close to his father, and when he was elected president for a second time in the Chilean presidential election of 1932, he again functioned as his assistant. In 1933, Alessandri was elected deputy for "Tarapacá and Antofagasta", and in January 1934, he was elected a senator to replace Aurelio Núñez, who had been designated Ambassador to Spain. He was reelected in 1937 and 1945. In 1939 he accompanied his father on a tour of Europe.

In 1946, he was proclaimed presidential candidate by the Liberal, Radical Democratic, Agrarian Labor, Democratic, Progressive Liberal and "Authentic" Socialist parties who refused to back the Conservative candidate Eduardo Cruz-Coke. Nonetheless, his split of the right-wing voting base resulted in the triumph of Gabriel González Videla, with him finishing in third place.

After the death of his father, he was elected President of the Senate to replace him on September 6, 1950, position he retained until 1958. He was again reelected as a senator for the 1953–1961 and in 1961–1969 periods. The progressive and almost total loss of sight forced him to leave public life.

In 1966, he abandoned his university classes and in 1969 he declined to run again and slowly withdrew from political life. He concentrated on his law practice and dedicated himself to writing law books and guides. He died in Santiago, on March 28, 1982, at the age of 84, due to renal failure.
