= Empresa Nacional del Petróleo =

National Petroleum Company
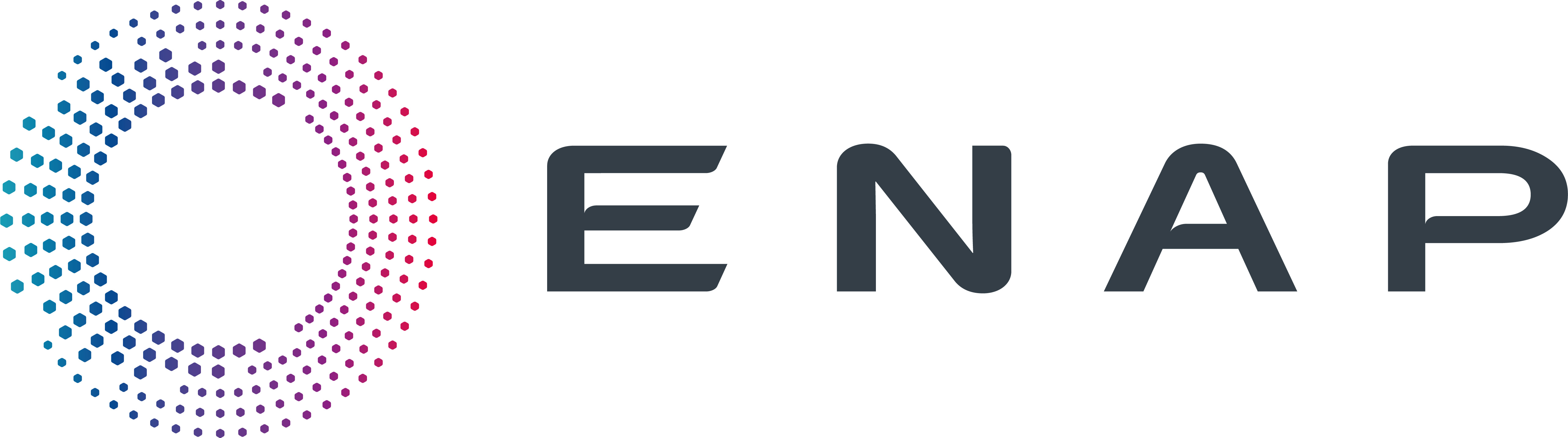
- Native name: Empresa Nacional del Petróleo
- Industry: Oil and gas industry
- Founded: 1950
- Headquarters: Las Condes, Chile
- Key people: Gloria Maldonado, Chairwoman; Julio Friedmann Encina, Chief Executive Officer
- Products: Petroleum
- Revenue: ▲$7.6 billion (2021)
- Net income: ▲$141.5 million (2021)
- Total assets: ▲$6.9 billion (2021)
- Total equity: ▲$1.0 billion (2021)
- Number of employees: 3,312 (2021)
- Website: www.enap.cl

The National Petroleum Company, or (ENAP, from Spanish: Empresa Nacional del Petróleo) is a state-owned company in Chile, based in Las Condes. The company is engaged in the exploration, production, refining, and marketing of hydrocarbons and their derivatives.

== Corporate overview ==
ENAP was created by Law No. 9618 on June 19, 1950. It was initially responsible for prospecting for and exploiting oil in Tierra del Fuego and the Strait of Magellan, where deposits were discovered between 1945 and 1950.

The company's subsidiary, ENAP Refinerías, operates three refineries: Aconcagua, Bío Bío, and Gregorio. Together, they have a total capacity of 238,000 barrels per day (37,800 m^{3}/d), which represents all of Chile's refining capacity. The three refineries supply over 80% of Chile's fuel needs.

ENAP's international exploration and production subsidiary, ENAP Sipetrol ("International Petroleum Company"), was founded in 1990. The company has operations in Argentina, Ecuador, and Egypt. Sipetrol began exploration in Iran in 2001, but had ceased operations there by 2018. Sipetrol had a 49 percent ownership interest in Manu Peru (a gas station chain located in Peru) and Primax Comercial (a gas station chain located in Ecuador), but sold this interest in 2013.
