= 1946 Chilean presidential election =

Election for the president of Chile

- 4 September 1946
- Registered: 631,257
- Turnout: 75.93% (▼4.30pp)
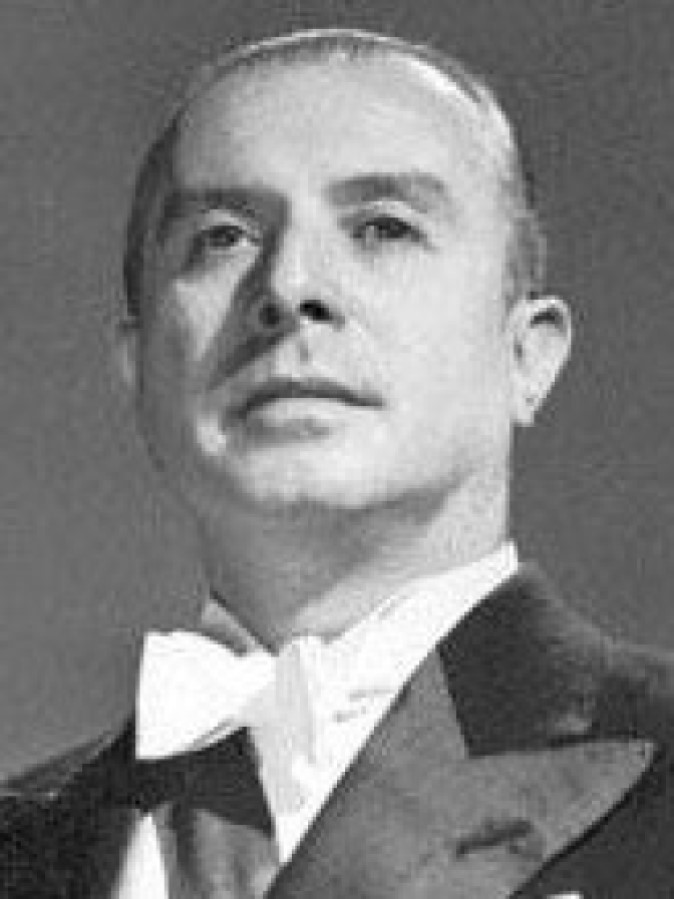

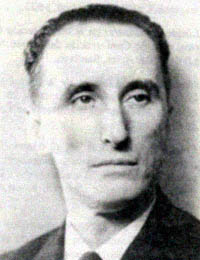

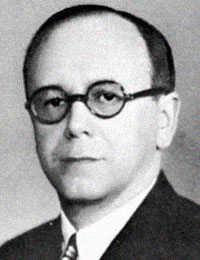
Nominee	Gabriel González Videla	Eduardo Cruz-Coke	Fernando Alessandri
Party	Radical	Conservative	Liberal
Popular vote	192,207	142,441	131,023
Percentage	40.23%	29.81%	27.42%
Congress vote	138	46	–
- Results by commune
President before election
Alfredo Duhalde (acting)
Radical
Elected President
Gabriel González Videla
Radical

Presidential elections were held in Chile on 4 September 1946. The result was a victory for Gabriel González Videla of the Radical Party, who received 40% of the popular vote and 75% of the Congressional vote.

== Electoral system ==
The election was conducted using the absolute majority system, wherein a candidate had to secure more than 50% of the popular vote to be elected. In the event that no candidate obtained the required majority, both houses of the National Congress would convene to vote on the two candidates with the highest number of votes.

== Candidates ==
=== Gabriel González Videla ===
In early 1946, the Radical Party Congress took place in Valdivia from 24 to 27 January, during which the presidential candidate was to be chosen. An internal vote was planned to decide between Gabriel González Videla and Arturo Olavarría, who had the support of the Duhaldista faction. However, shortly before the vote on 28 April, the Duhaldista faction withdrew their backing for Olavarría and abstained. Consequently, he suffered a significant defeat at the hands of his opponent. The final results of the Radical Party's internal plebiscite were as follows:

Candidate	Party	Votes	%
Gabriel González Videla	PR	22,159	84.9%
Arturo Olavarría Bravo	PR	3,938	15.1%
Blank votes		195	
Null votes		14	
Total votes cast		26,306	100%

The Democratic Alliance, the successor of the Popular Front, held a convention on 20 July. The following day, they unanimously decided to support González, disregarding the candidacy of the communist Elías Lafertte. The results of the voting at the convention were as follows:

Candidate	Party	Voting rounds			
Candidate	Party	1st	2nd	3rd	4th
Gabriel González Videla	PR	0	169	176	302
Elías Lafertte Gaviño	PCCh	94	108	123	0
Asdrúbal Pezoa	PSA	29	16	0	0
Jerónimo Méndez Arancibia	PR	165	0	0	0
Total votes cast		288	293	299	302

=== Bernardo Ibáñez ===
In light of González Videla's nomination as the Democratic Alliance candidate, the Socialist Party declared on 11 July that they would not endorse González and would instead field their own candidate. During a plenary session on 18 August, the Socialist Party officially announced the presidential candidacy of labor leader Bernardo Ibáñez.

=== Eduardo Cruz-Coke ===
The right-wing parties held their own convention starting on 6 July. Representatives from the conservative, liberal, and agrarian laborioust factions attended the convention and presented the following candidates:

- Conservatives: Eduardo Cruz-Coke.
- Labor Agrarians: Jaime Larraín.
- Liberals: Arturo Alessandri, José Maza Fernández, and Francisco Bulnes Correa.

However, none of the candidates were able to secure victory in the convention. The election required 65% and then 60% of the delegates' support, but no candidate met these thresholds. As a result, the convention was suspended on 14 July. The voting results from each day of the convention were as follows:

Candidate	Party	7 July						8 July						9 July					
Candidate	Party	1st	2nd	3rd	4th	5th	6th	1st	2nd	3rd	4th	5th	6th	1st	2nd	3rd	4th	5th	6th
Eduardo Cruz-Coke	PCon	0	384	369	406	436	435	383	392	374	396	424	422	377	379	409	415	418	413
Jaime Larraín García-Moreno	PAL	0	222	230	269	0	0	219	226	225	244	0	0	213	228	233	239	0	0
Arturo Alessandri Palma	PL	0	185	200	309	318	322	190	198	191	0	0	0	163	166	22	0	0	0
Francisco Bulnes Correa	PL	0	196	188	0	0	0	5	4	1	0	0	0	207	206	315	313	313	310
José Maza Fernández	PL	0	4	0	0	0	0	180	168	197	332	309	274	1	0	0	0	0	0
Fernando Alessandri Rodríguez	PL	0	0	0	0	0	0	1	1	0	0	0	0	2	0	0	0	0	0
Horacio Walker Larraín	PCon	0	0	0	0	0	0	0	0	0	0	0	0	1	0	0	0	0	0
Ambrosio Barros Moreira	PCon	0	0	0	0	0	0	0	0	0	0	0	0	1	0	0	0	0	0
Joaquín Prieto Concha	PCon	359	0	0	0	0	0	0	0	0	0	0	0	0	0	0	0	0	0
Oscar Urzúa Jaramillo	PL	339	0	0	0	0	0	0	0	0	0	0	0	0	0	0	0	0	0
Eduardo Necochea Nebel	PAL	150	0	0	0	0	0	0	0	0	0	0	0	0	0	0	0	0	0

Candidate	Party	10 July					11 July					12 July					13 July				
Candidate	Party	1ª	2ª	3ª	4ª	5ª	1ª	2ª	3ª	4ª	5ª	1ª	2ª	3ª	4ª	5ª	1ª	2ª	3ª	4ª	5ª
Eduardo Cruz-Coke	PCon	371	378	386	528	526	543	529	516	520	526	400	417	415	429	431	402	395	378	422	435
Jaime Larraín García-Moreno	PAL	270	323	356	412	429	403	434	441	444	434	0	231	231	0	0	255	270	278	0	0
Arturo Alessandri Palma	PL	0	0	0	0	0	0	0	0	0	0	0	323	329	357	363	0	0	0	0	0
Francisco Bulnes Correa	PL	14	0	0	0	0	0	2	0	0	0	0	0	0	0	0	0	0	0	0	0
José Maza Fernández	PL	263	259	223	0	0	0	0	0	0	0	0	0	0	0	0	244	294	313	298	420

Numerous efforts to reach an agreement on a single candidate were unsuccessful, leading to the emergence of two main contenders: Eduardo Cruz-Coke, backed by conservatives, and Arturo Alessandri, supported by liberals and labor agrarians. Eventually, Cruz-Coke became the sole candidate supported by the conservatives, while the liberals, labor agrarians, and a faction of the Radicalism (Democratic Radical Party) continued to support Fernando Alessandri's candidacy. This situation occurred following the resignations of Arturo Alessandri and Vice President Alfredo Duhalde on 11 August and 13 August, respectively.

=== Fernando Alessandri ===
The Democratic Alliance's support for González led to the division of a faction within the radical movement that opposed the communist-radical alliance. This division resulted in the formation of the Democratic Radical Party, led by Julio Durán and Arturo Olavarría. The party endorsed Alfredo Duhalde as their candidate, with additional support from the Authentic Socialist Party. Duhalde accepted the nomination on 3 August, resigning from his position as Vice President of the Republic and handing over power to Vice Admiral Vicente Merino on the same day.

Subsequently, on 11 August, Arturo Alessandri withdrew his candidacy in favor of his son, Fernando Alessandri Rodríguez. Fernando became the representative for the coalition of liberals, democratic radicals, and authentic socialists of Marmaduke Grove. Two days later, on 13 August, Alfredo Duhalde resigned from his candidacy, reclaiming the vice presidency of the Republic that he had left earlier in the month to pursue his political campaign. On the same day, 13 August, the Agrarian Labor Party announced its support for Fernando Alessandri's candidacy.

== Results ==
As none of the presidential candidates obtained an outright majority, as stipulated in the 1925 constitution, the responsibility fell on the Full Congress to choose between the two candidates who garnered the highest relative majorities.

These circumstances prompted the right-wing parties to pursue victory in the Full Congress after failing to achieve it at the ballot box. González Videla accused Eduardo Cruz-Coke of engaging in these maneuvers, which he claimed were aimed at disregarding the triumph of the left-wing candidacy, while simultaneously campaigning to secure the necessary support from different political groups in the Full Congress.

Utilizing his political acumen, González Videla successfully built a broad coalition of support. Following extensive deliberations, both Duhalde's supporters and the democratic radicals (except for Olavarría) decided to lend him their electoral backing. Subsequently, the National Falange joined the coalition, followed immediately by the agrarian and socialist parties, including both Grove and Bernardo Ibáñez factions.

Efforts to obtain support from the conservatives did not succeed. The communists also contributed their votes, and eventually, the liberals, who initially refused, opted to support him.

Candidate	Party	Popular vote		Congress vote	
Candidate	Party	Votes	%	Votes	%
Gabriel González Videla	Radical Party	192,207	40.23	138	75.00
Eduardo Cruz-Coke	Conservative Party	142,441	29.81	46	25.00
Fernando Alessandri	Liberal Party	131,023	27.42		
Bernardo Ibáñez	Socialist Party	12,114	2.54		
Other candidates		16	0.00		
Total		477,801	100.00	184	100.00
Valid votes		477,801	99.69	184	99.46
Invalid/blank votes		1,509	0.31	1	0.54
Total votes		479,310	100.00	185	100.00
Registered voters/turnout		631,257	75.93	192	96.35
Source: Nohlen, Chilean Electoral Database
