= Eduardo Cruz-Coke =

Chilean politician

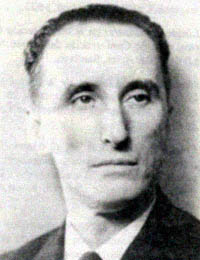
- Born: April 22, 1899; Valparaíso, Chile
- Died: March 18, 1974 (aged 74); Santiago, Chile

Eduardo Cruz-Coke Lassabe (April 22, 1899 – March 18, 1974) was a Chilean political figure, the conservative candidate in Chile's 1946 presidential election and the principal creator of the Chilean health system.

Cruz-Coke was born in Valparaíso, Chile, the son of Ricardo Cruz-Coke and of Celeste Lassabe. He completed his secondary studies at the Padres Franceses in Santiago, and later graduated as a medical doctor from the Universidad de Chile in 1921. While still a student, Cruz-Coke together with classmate Emilio Tizzoni, founded the National Association of Catholic Students (Spanish: Asociación Nacional de Estudiantes Católicos) (ANEC) based on the Catholic social teachings. Cruz-Coke became its first president, and in 1920 he joined the Conservative party.

After working as a microscopy assistant to professor Juan Noé, in 1925 he became professor of physiology and pathology at the same university, a position he retained until 1955. The same year, he travelled to Berlin to a sexology congress and remained in Europe studying for a year. At his return, he founded the Society of Biology of Santiago in 1928. Between 1927 and 1937 he was Chief of Medicine at the San Juan de Dios Hospital.

Between 1937 and 1938 Cruz-Coke served as Minister of Public Health, Social Assistance and Welfare appointed by President Arturo Alessandri. During his tenure, Cruz-Coke implemented a health program based upon a strictly scientific (as opposed to politic) approach to tackle the main health challenges, particularly maternal and infant mortality. He was the force behind Law 6026 (for Mother and Child) and Law 6174 (of Preventive Medicine). He set up a "National Food Council" (Spanish: Consejo Nacional de Alimentación) that defined innovative policies to improve the alimentary weaknesses, particularly among the low-income sectors, and organized the Preventive Medicine Services to diminish labour sickness. The measures had a positive impact in Public Health indexes and were followed by its successors.

In 1941, Cruz-Coke was elected a senator for Santiago and was reelected in 1949. In 1946, he was proclaimed presidential candidate by the Conservative party, but a split of his voting base between him and Fernando Alessandri resulted in the triumph of Gabriel González Videla, with Cruz-Coke finishing in second place. In 1948, Cruz-Coke founded the Social Christian Conservative Party.

After the end of his senatorial term in 1957, he decided not to run for reelection. In 1958 he was named Ambassador to Peru, where he remained until 1960. In 1963 he was named the first president of the newly established National Committee on Atomic Energy (Spanish: Comisión Nacional de Energía Atómica), and in 1965 produced the first plan for the use of nuclear power in the mining industries of the north of Chile. He died in Santiago, in 1974, at the age of 74.

== See also ==
- 1946 Chilean presidential election

Political offices
Preceded by Javier Castro	Minister of Public Health, Social Assistance and Welfare; 1937–1938	Succeeded by Luis Prúnes
