= Law of Permanent Defense of Democracy =

1948 Chilean law

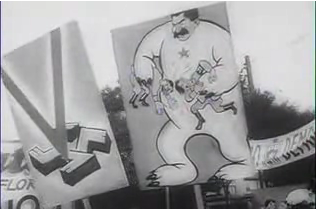
A caricature of Joseph Stalin during a pro-Allied rally in Santiago, 1943

In 1948, on the initiative of Chilean President Gabriel González Videla, the Chilean National Congress enacted the Permanent Defense of Democracy Law (Spanish: Ley de Defensa Permanente de la Democracia, Ley N° 8.987), referred to by many as the Damned Law (Ley Maldita), which outlawed the Communist Party of Chile and banned 26,650 persons from the electoral lists.

The law banned the expression of ideas which appeared to advocate "the implantation in the republic of a regime opposed to democracy or which attack the sovereignty of the country."

The detention center in Pisagua which had been created in the late 1920s during Carlos Ibáñez del Campo's first Presidency and authoritarian rule (and which would later be used under Pinochet) was re-opened to imprison communists, anarchists and various revolutionaries, although on this occasion no detainees were executed. Prominent communists such as the senator and poet Pablo Neruda fled into exile. González Videla also broke relations with the Soviet Union and Warsaw Pact states. Also, on the political basis of the law, pro-communist miners' strike in Lota was brutally suppressed. Demonstrations against the legislation led to the declaration of martial law and were also repressed.

The law was replaced by Law n.º 12.927 on State Security, on 6. August 1958 which ended the prohibition of the Communist Party and lowered penalties for crimes against "state security and public order" to levels comparable with those that existed prior to 1948.

== See also ==
- Neruda (2016 film)
