= Bernardo Ibáñez =

Chilean politician (1902-1983)

Bernardo Ibáñez Águila
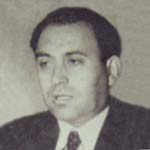
- Born: July 12, 1902; Antuco, Chile
- Died: August 19, 1983 (aged 81); Santiago, Chile

Bernardo Ibáñez Águila (July 12, 1902 in Antuco, Chile – August 19, 1983 in Santiago, Chile) was a Chilean schoolteacher and political figure. He was the Socialist candidate in Chile's 1946 presidential election.

Ibáñez was union leader at the Confederation of Workers of Chile (Spanish: Confederación de Trabajadores de Chile, or CTCH). In 1941, he was elected as deputy for Valparaíso and Quillota. In 1946, he was proclaimed presidential candidate by the Socialist Party and only got 2.53% of votes, because many socialists supported to the radical candidate Gabriel González Videla. He belonged to the anti-communist faction of the Socialist Party.

== Biography ==
Ibáñez taught in Antuco Primary School and Victoria Normal School. As a Teachers' union leader and member of the General Association of Teachers (AGP), becoming Secretary General of it. He was instrumental in the creation of the General Association of Teachers by leading a group of teachers in separating from the PGA. Finally participates in the creation of the Union of Teachers of Chile in 1935.

The representative of normal school teachers in the Confederation of Chilean Workers (Confederación de Trabajadores de Chile) (CTCH). Elected the Secretary General in the CTCH during the First National Congress of Chile (I Congreso Naciona de Chile) in 1939. He led the Socialist faction of CTCH 1946-1953, until the dividing of this union. Subsequent to the creation of the Central Unica de Trabajadores (CUT), to which both factions merged into the CTCH.

His international connections remained with the American Confederation of Workers (Confederación Interamericana de Trabajadores) (CIT). The group would make Ibáñez its first president in 1948 and in 1951, the group then became affiliated with the American Regional Organization of Workers (Organización Regional Interamericana de Trabajadores) (ORIT) founding this in 1951.

Ibáñez was a founding member of Chile's modern Socialist Party (Partido Socialista de Chile) (PS). This party is the current anticommunist-PS which was formed in 1944, in support of President Gabriel Gonzalez Videla. He was the Secretary General of the PS between 1944-1946.

Ibáñez was elected deputy for 6th Departmental district of Valparaiso and Quillota. between the years of 1941-1945. Ibáñez was the PS presidential candidate for the 1946 election, but on gained 12,114 votes (2.53%).

== See also ==
- 1946 Chilean presidential election
