= Elías Lafertte =

Chilean politician (1886-1961)

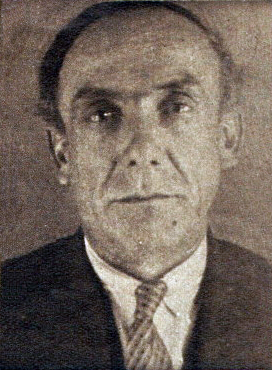
- Elías Lafertte in 1938

Member of the Senate of Chile
- In office 15 May 1937 – 15 May 1953
- Succeeded by: Salvador Allende
- Constituency: Antofagasta

President of the Communist Party of Chile
- In office 2 January 1922 – 17 February 1961
- Preceded by: Position established
- Succeeded by: Volodia Teitelboim

Personal details
- Born: 19 December 1886 Salamanca, Chile
- Died: 17 February 1961 (aged 74) Santiago de Chile, Chile
- Party: Communist Party of Chile
- Occupation: Miner

Elías Lafertte Gaviño (December 19, 1886 – February 17, 1961) was a Chilean worker in saltpeter mining and a communist politician. Lafertte ran in the 1931 and 1932 presidential elections ending in third and fifth place. He was senator from 1937 to 1953.

== Biography ==
Lafertte was born into a working-class family. He started working in a nitrate mine at the age of eleven. In 1911 he met Luis Emilio Recabarren. With him and other members of the Democrat Party, Lafertte founded the Socialist Workers' Party in June 1912, which was renamed the Communist Party of Chile in 1922.

After a strike in Antofagasta in 1914 he was imprisoned for the first time. In 1917 he worked for La Vanguardia (The Vanguard) in Valparaíso. A member of the board since 1923, Lafertte Gaviño was treasurer of the Federación Obrera de Chile (FOCh) trade union from 1924 to 1926, and from 1926 its general secretary (confirmed in 1931 and 1933). In 1929 he was elected to the Central Committee and in 1936 to the Politburo of the Central Committee of the Communist Party of Chile.

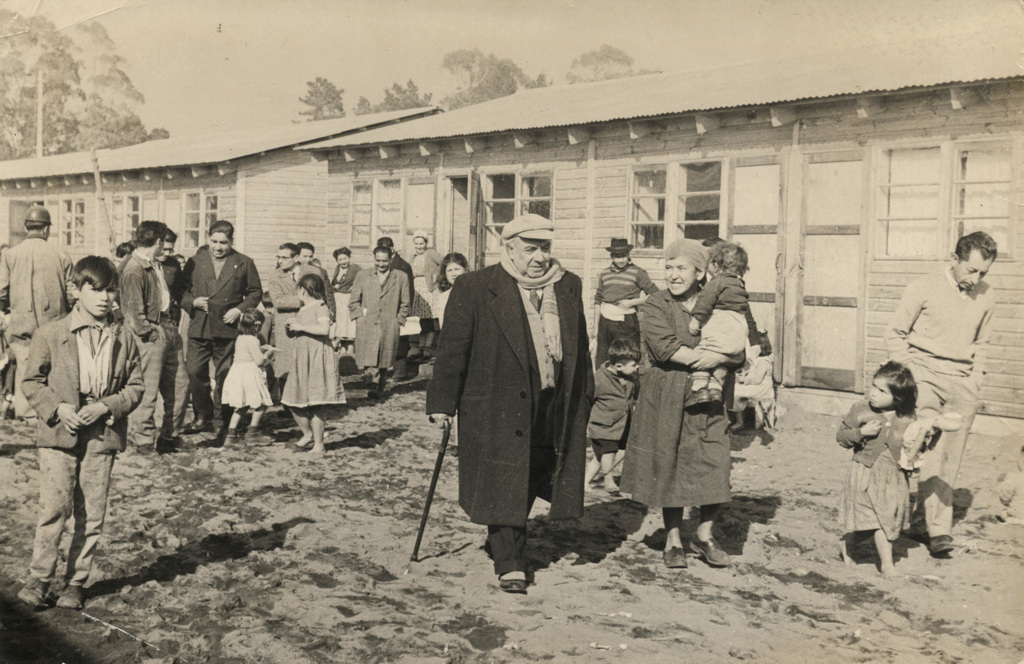
Elías Lafertte walking through a poor neighborhood.

During the dictatorship of Carlos Ibáñez del Campo, Lafertte was arrested and banished several times (1927 to the Isla Más Afuera, 1930 to Easter Island and to the south of the country to Calbuco, Chiloé). In 1927, 1931 and 1932 he was a candidate for the presidency of the Communist Party. From 1939 to 1961 he was chairman of the Central Committee of the Chilean Communist Party. From 1937 to 1953 he was a member of the Senate for Tarapacá and Antofagasta.
