= CORFO =

Chilean governmental agency

Production Development Corporation
- Corporación de Fomento de la Producción

Agency overview
- Formed: 1939
- Headquarters: Moneda 921; Santiago
- Website: Official website (in Spanish)

The Production Development Corporation (CORFO, from Spanish: Corporación de Fomento de la Producción de Chile) is a Chilean governmental organization that was founded in 1939 by President Pedro Aguirre Cerda to promote economic growth in Chile.

Originally, CORFO was responsible for the creation of basic industries during the Presidential Republic Era, namely oil, power, steel, sugar, transportation among many others (see Economy of Chile).

CORFO oversees a variety of programs aimed at generating the economic development of Chile, through the promotion of inward investment and the advocacy of competitiveness for domestic companies. CORFO's main areas are Quality and Productivity, Innovation and Investment Promotion.
