= Jorge Alessandri =

Chilean politician and President (1896–1986)

Jorge Alessandri OMCh
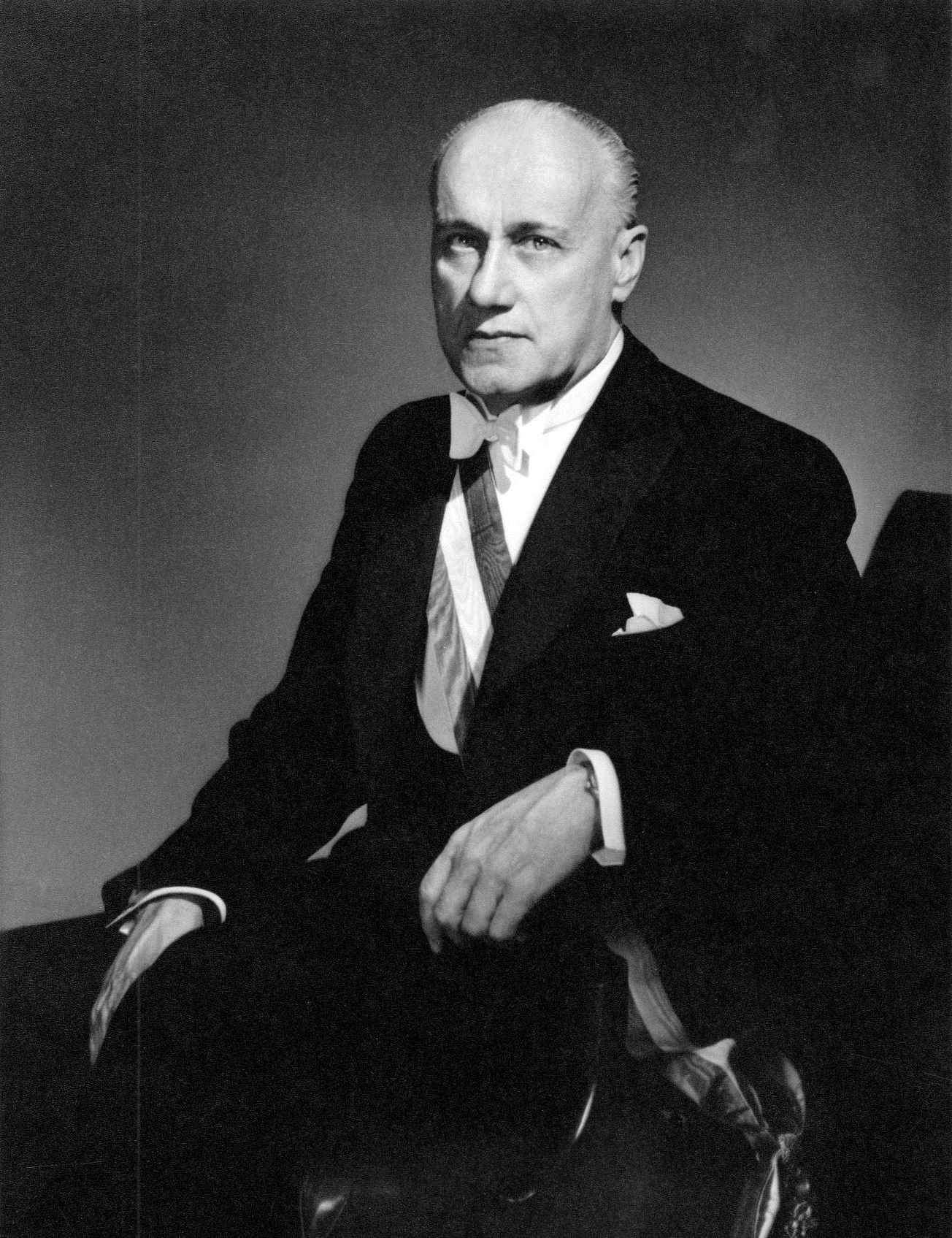
- Official portrait,1958

27th President of Chile
- In office 3 November 1958 – 3 November 1964
- Preceded by: Carlos Ibáñez del Campo
- Succeeded by: Eduardo Frei Montalva

Minister of Finance
- In office 2 August 1947 – 7 February 1950
- President: Gabriel González Videla
- Preceded by: Germán Picó Cañas
- Succeeded by: Arturo Maschke

Senator
- In office 15 May 1957 – 3 November 1958
- Constituency: Santiago

Member of the Chamber of Deputies
- In office 15 May 1926 – 15 May 1930
- Constituency: Santiago

Personal details
- Born: Jorge Alessandri Rodríguez; May 19, 1896 Santiago, Chile
- Died: August 31, 1986 (aged 90) Santiago, Chile
- Resting place: Santiago General Cemetery; Santiago, Chile
- Party: Independent (Note: Although officially independent, Alessandri was nominated by the Liberal Party for his 1957 Senate election.)
- Parent(s): Arturo Alessandri and Rosa Rodríguez
- Education: University of Chile
- Profession: Civil engineer, entrepreneur, politician
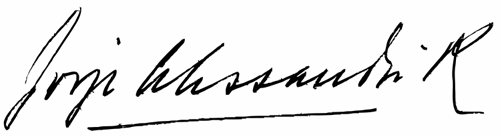
- Signature

Jorge Eduardo Alessandri Rodríguez (Latin American Spanish: [ˈxoɾxe aleˈsandɾi roˈðɾiɣes]; 19 May 1896 – 31 August 1986) was the 27th President of Chile from 1958 to 1964, and was the candidate of the Chilean right in the crucial presidential election of 1970, which he lost to Salvador Allende. He was the son of Arturo Alessandri, who was president from 1920 to 1925 and again from 1932 to 1938.

== Early years ==
Jorge Alessandri was born in Santiago. He studied at Instituto Nacional General José Miguel Carrera, prestigious public high school of Santiago, and University of Chile, and after graduating in 1919 worked there as a lecturer. After the fall of the parliamentary republic, he lived in European exile with his parents from 1924 to 1925, but returned to his native land where he was elected to parliament as an independent from a Santiago constituency in 1926.

He withdrew from public life in 1932 to concentrate on business interests, becoming president of the mortgage bank, Caja de Crédito Hipotecario until 1938 and running the Paper and Cardboard Manufacturing Company. From 1944 to 1947, he was chairman of the Chilean employers' confederation.

== Return to politics ==
The early years of the Presidency of Gabriel González were marked by serious unrest between left and right-wing supporters, and on 2 August 1947 González named a cabinet of military officers and independents in a supposed attempt to depoliticise the situation. Alessandri was named Minister of Finance, where he reordered the system of administration and pursued a rigorous programme of austerity.

By 1950, he had restored order to the public finances and controlled inflation. However, his freezes of public sector remuneration gradually led to greater industrial unrest. Public sector workers came out on strike at the end of January 1950, which rapidly turned into a broad opposition against the government's economic policies. Along with the rest of the cabinet, Alessandri resigned on 3 February, and returned to his role as president of the employers' confederation.

== Senate and presidency ==
In 1956, the Liberal Party selected him as a candidate for a Santiago Senate seat, which he won with a substantial majority in 1957. However, Alessandri was seen as rather conservative by the Liberal Party, and in the end it was the moderate wing of the Conservative Party which secured his position as an independent candidate for the Presidency, with his campaign majoring on his economic expertise.

In March 1958, he edged the united left candidate for the Presidency, Salvador Allende by 32.2% to 28.5%, with Christian Democrat Eduardo Frei Montalva polling 20.5%. In the event of no candidate securing an overall majority of the popular vote, the choice of president fell to Congress, which duly chose Alessandri, who had a coalition of Conservatives, Liberals and Radical Party congressmen behind him.

Alessandri initially focused, unsurprisingly, on economic issues, particularly on controlling inflation and balancing the state budget, and he liberalised Chile's tariff régime. However, he once again froze public sector pay, unleashing widespread industrial unrest.

In May 1960, a strong earthquake struck the densely populated area between Concepción and Puerto Montt, causing more than US$400 million in damage. Reconstruction and relief soon drowned out other issues. The earthquake effectively interrupted and ended Lota's coal miners march on Concepción as they were demanding higher salaries.

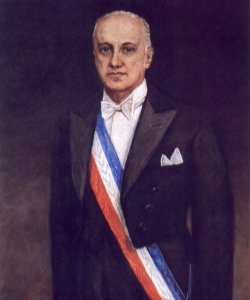
Jorge Alessandri's official portrait

In 1961, elections to Congress saw massive losses for the Conservatives and Liberals, with the Radicals, alone of the coalition parties, doing well. This forced Alessandri to nominate more Ministers from the Radical Party, which in turn moved his government to the left. This tied in with the more activist foreign development policy pursued by John F Kennedy in the wake of the Cuban Revolution of 1959, in the shape of the Alliance for Progress. Together, these unleashed a wave of progressive tax and agricultural reforms. Despite this, distribution of land ownership remained grossly unequal.

Alessandri's period of office ended in 1964, and he was succeeded by his opponent of 1958, the Christian Democrat Eduardo Frei Montalva. Alessandri returned to managing his paper factory.

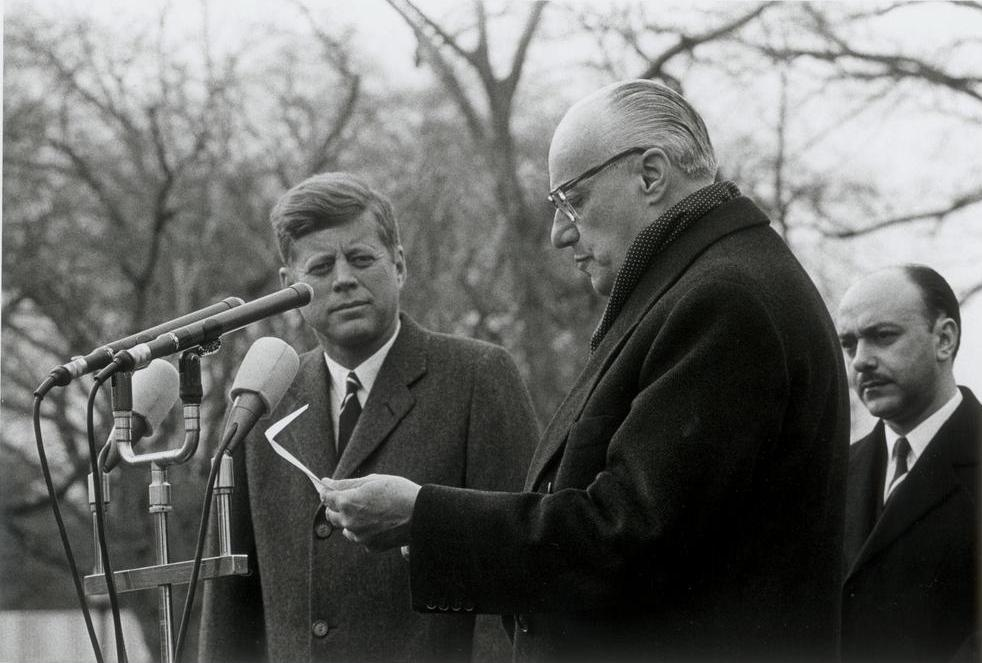
President Jorge Alessandri with President John F. Kennedy (1962)

== Public life after his government ==
On 3 November 1965, in the press published a letter, supported by 900 firms, where directed to Alessandri to analyze the general reality and highlight his public action, thus starting his second presidential candidacy. Publishing in the press in September 1968, a manifesto to the country -subscribed by Guillermo Feliú Cruz, historian; Hugo Galvez Gajardo, former Minister; Adolfo Silva Henríquez, farmer; Jaime Guzmán Errázuriz, university leader; Eduardo Boetsch G. H., engineer; and Jorge Delano Frederick, reporter requested adhesions to promote the presidential candidacy of Jorge Alessandri. Although Alessandri kept a low profile for most of the 1964-1970 period, he never explicitly ruled out a return to politics. On one occasion he said of the Chilean people: "I perceived, and necessarily, the rumor growing tide of discontent, despair and anxiety, inevitable product of just awakened but unsatisfied aspirations."

== Allende's election and Pinochet's dictatorship ==
In 1970, following the end of Frei's period in office, Jorge Alessandri sought election as President once again, with his main opponent Salvador Allende, just as in 1958. After another close contest, Allende emerged in front this time, by the narrow margin of 37.3% to 35.8%, with Christian Democrat Radomiro Tomić polling 27.9% on polling day, 4 September. As in 1958, the election went to Congress, this time on 24 October. Although Congress placed a number of conditions on Allende such as his signature of a Statute of Constitutional Guarantees, promising not to undermine the Chilean Constitution, Alessandri lost the final vote by a decisive 153–35, with Tomic's Christian Democrats supporting Allende.

According to Sergio Riesenberg Alessandri's appearance on TV backfired and cost him the election. On the TV program Decisión 70 directed by Gonzalo Bertrán there were two separate shots that showed him in bad light. In the first Alessandri said that he would be determined and that his "hands would not shake", subsequently the camera focused his hands that were actually shaking. In the second frame he was seen next to a stove warming his legs with a blanket despite being Spring. According to Riesenberg all this gave the public the impression of a man who was not longer "in an adequate age to become president".

After the military coup of 11 September 1973 General Augusto Pinochet seized power and formed a government, and in 1976 Alessandri was named President of a newly formed Council of State, which served as advisor to the Junta in matters of legislation, and which also played a role in the drafting of the new constitution. The Council suggested changes to the draft prepared by the Ortúzar Committee, but many of the most important recommendations were dismissed by the Junta. Alessandri did not agree with some of the Junta's authoritarian amendments and resigned from the council. The constitution was approved in a national plebiscite held in September 1980 and came into force in March 1981. During the campaign, Alessandri declared he would vote "Yes", despite his disagreements with the Junta.

== Final years ==
After this, Jorge Alessandri once more withdrew into private life, now for the last time, living rather peacefully in his apartment in the center of Santiago. He continued to be chairman of the board of a paper factory until his death in Santiago in 1986. He did not live to see the end of the junta and the return of Chile to democracy.

His death had some influence in the attempted assassination of Augusto Pinochet by Manuel Rodríguez Patriotic Front as it made Pinochet travel back to Santiago prematurely changing thus the schedule of the attack.

His nephew Arturo Alessandri Besa stood as presidential candidate for the right-wing Alianza in 1993, losing to the Christian Democrat Eduardo Frei Ruiz-Tagle of the Concertación center-left coalition.

== See also ==
- Alessandri family

Political offices
| Preceded by Carlos Ibáñez | President of Chile; November 3, 1958 - November 3, 1964 | Succeeded by Eduardo Frei Montalva |
