= Pedro Aguirre Cerda =

Chilean politician (1879–1941)

Pedro Aguirre Cerda OMCh
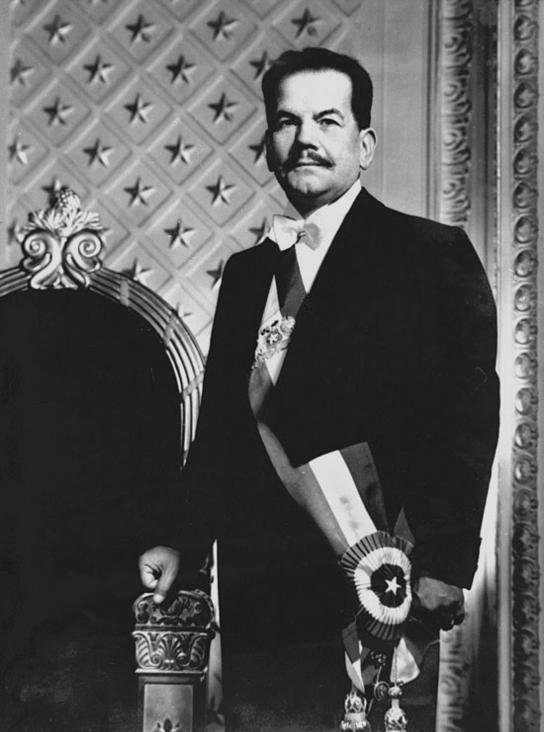

23rd President of Chile
- In office December 25, 1938 – November 25, 1941
- Preceded by: Arturo Alessandri
- Succeeded by: Jerónimo Méndez

Personal details
- Born: February 6, 1879 Pocuro, Chile
- Died: November 25, 1941 (aged 62) Santiago, Chile
- Resting place: Cementerio General de Santiago
- Party: Radical
- Spouse: Juana Rosa Aguirre Luco (m. 1916)
- Education: University of Chile; University of Paris; Collège de France
- Occupation: Politician; educator; lawyer
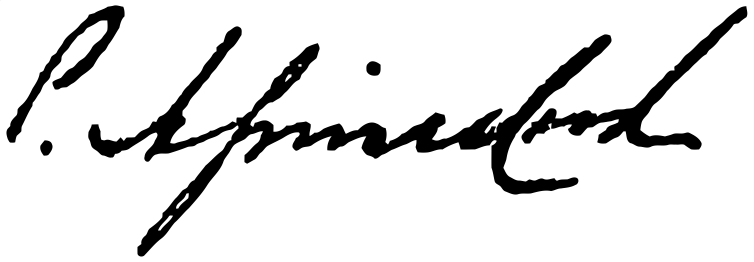
- Signature

Pedro Abelino Aguirre Cerda (Latin American Spanish: [ˈpeðɾo aˈɣire ˈseɾða]; February 6, 1879 – November 25, 1941) was a Chilean political figure, educator, and lawyer who served as the 23rd president of Chile from 1938 until his death in 1941. He was a center left moderate.

A member of the Radical Party since 1906, he was chosen by the left-wing Popular Front coalition as its candidate for the 1938 presidential election and won. He had previously served as deputy for San Felipe, Putaendo and Los Andes from 1915 to 1918, Minister of the Interior from January to September 1918 under president Juan Luis Sanfuentes, deputy for Santiago from 1918 to 1921, Minister of Justice and Public Instruction from 1920 to 1921 under president Arturo Alessandri, and senator for Concepción from 1921 to 1927.

He died two years and eleven months into his presidency on November 25, 1941, at the age of 62, from tuberculosis.

== Early life ==
Pedro Aguirre Cerda was born on February 6, 1879, in Pocuro, a small village near the city of Los Andes, Chile. He was the seventh of eleven children born to parents Juan Bautista Aguirre Campos and Clarisa Cerda Escudero. His father, a farmer, died in 1887 when he was eight years old, leaving his widowed mother to run the farm and raise the eleven children on her own. His family was of Basque descent.

He completed his initial tertiary studies at the Pedagogical Institute of the University of Chile in Santiago, becoming a Spanish teacher. He continued his studies at the university's faculty of law, becoming a lawyer in 1904. In 1910, he received a government grant to study administrative and financial law at the Sorbonne in Paris and political economy and social legislation at the Collège de France. He returned to Chile in 1914 and took a position as a teacher at the Instituto Nacional and was elected as president of the National Society of Teachers. In 1916, he married his first cousin Juana Rosa Aguirre Luco, with whom he had no children.

Aguirre was a very distinguished teacher, attorney, deputy and senator. He was also the first dean of the new school of economy of the University of Chile. As a member of the Radical Party, he was minister of Public Instruction and of the Interior during the administrations of Juan Luis Sanfuentes and Arturo Alessandri. During the period of military domination, he was persecuted and became an active opposition leader to the government of General Carlos Ibáñez del Campo.

He was chosen by the Popular Front coalition of left-wing parties and trade unions as its candidate in the 1938 Chilean presidential election, where he narrowly defeated right-wing candidate Gustavo Ross of the Liberal-Conservative coalition by 4,111 votes.

== Presidency ==
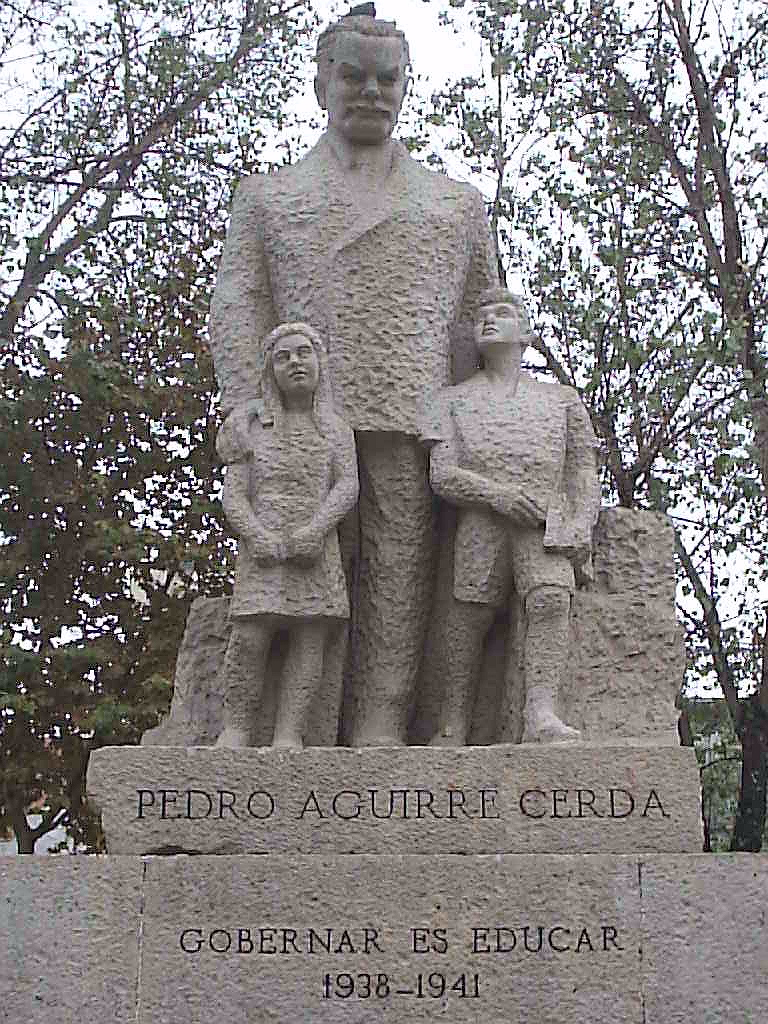
Monument commemorating Pedro Aguirre Cerda in Santiago

Aguirre Cerda assumed his duties as president on December 25, 1938, under the slogan "Gobernar es educar" (to govern is to educate). As a teacher, his priority in government was education. As such, he promoted the development of the technical-industrial schools as a means to promote the formation of technicians for the nascent industrialization of the country. He also created thousands of new regular schools and encouraged the growth of the university system to cover the whole of the country. Aguirre's government also redistributed some land, encouraged the formation of agricultural settlements, built low-cost housing and schools, and integrated the Marxist parties into the political system.

During his first year he had to face military opposition to his plans, which boiled over with the so-called Ariostazo. He also promoted and campaigned for a Nobel Prize for Gabriela Mistral, which only came to fruition under his successor, Juan Antonio Ríos.

On the economic side, and prompted in part by the devastating earthquake of 1939, he created the Production Development Corporation (Corporación de Fomento de la Producción - CORFO) to encourage with subsidies and direct investments an ambitious program of import substitution industrialization. This was the basis for the industrialization of Chile. From there sprung the steel, manufacturing and sugar industries.

In 1941, due to his rapidly escalating illness, he appointed his Minister of the Interior Jerónimo Méndez as vice-president to succeed him. He died soon after on November 25, 1941, in Santiago, Chile, from tuberculosis. Méndez served as acting president until Juan Antonio Rios, elected on February 1, 1942, took office on April 2.

== Legacy ==
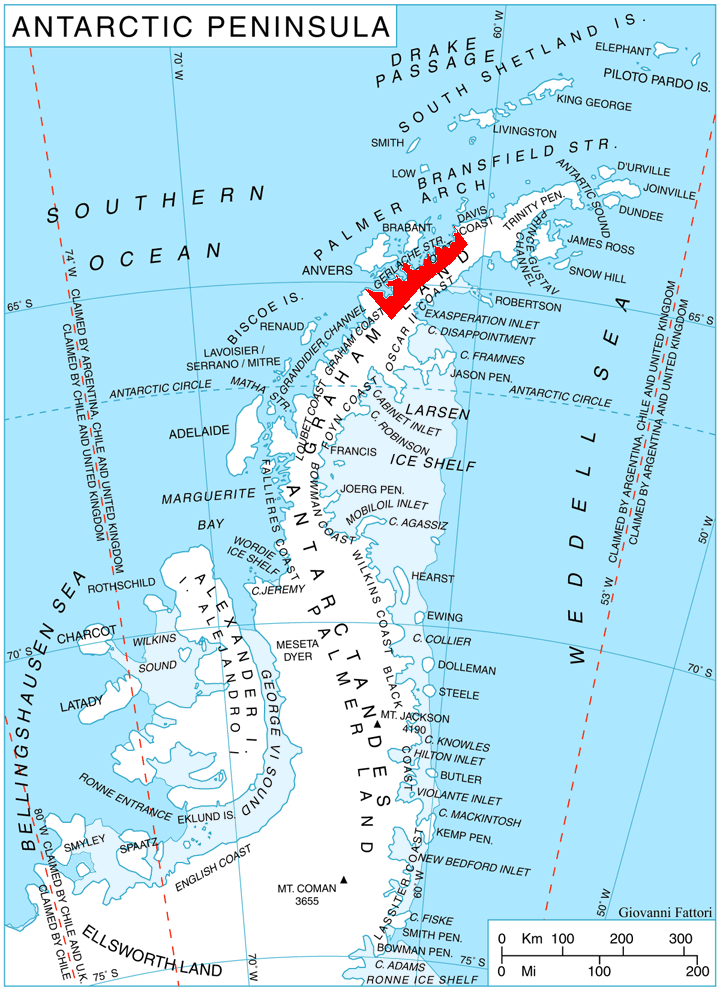
A map highlighting of the Danco Coast near the Aguirre Passage on the Antarctic Peninsula.

In the Chilean Antarctic Expedition in 1950–51, the explorers named the Aguirre Passage between Lemaire Island and Danco Coast after Don Pedro Aguirre Cerda.

Salvador Allende, one of Aguirre Cerda's close associates and Minister of Health under his presidency, would become president in 1970.

On July 3, 2018, another statue of him was inaugurated in the center of Santiago, this time in the Plaza de la Constitución, on the corner of Moneda and Teatinos streets.

== See also ==
- Economic history of Chile
- Ariostazo

Political offices
Preceded by Pedro García de la Huerta	Minister of the Interior; 1920-1921	Succeeded by Héctor Arancibia
Preceded by Domingo Amunátegui	Minister of the Interior; 1924	Succeeded by José Maza
Preceded by Cornelio Saavedra Montt	Minister of the Interior; 1924	Succeeded by Luis Altamirano
Preceded by Arturo Alessandri	President of Chile; 1938-1941	Succeeded by Jerónimo Méndez
