= Ibañismo =

Chilean political ideology

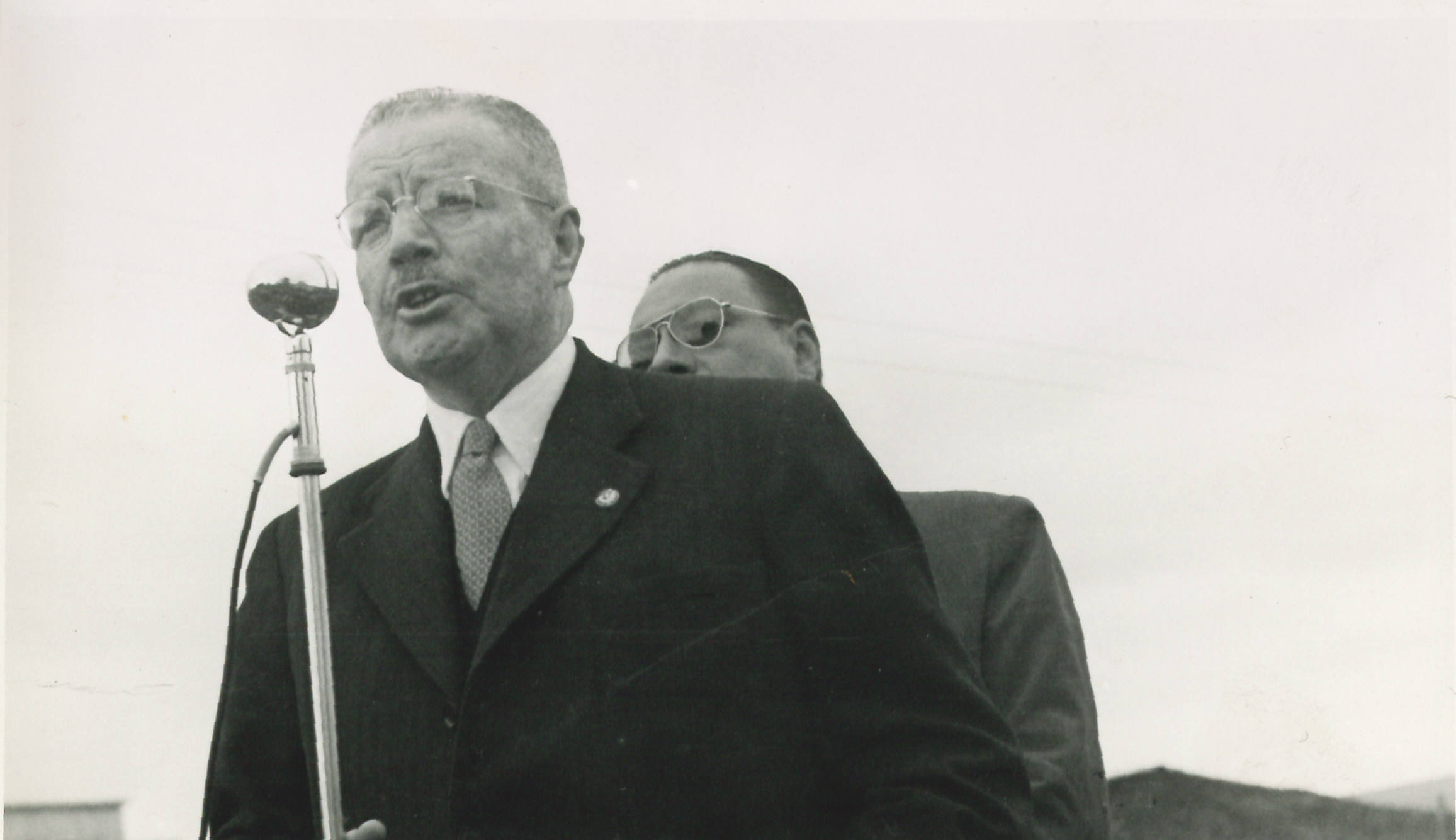
Carlos Ibáñez del Campo during his 1952 presidential election campaign.

Ibañismo is a personalist, populist political movement developed around the figure of General Carlos Ibáñez del Campo, who governed Chile over two periods (1927-1931 and 1952–1958). Although their location within the political spectrum is unclear, given that there were parties and movements of both the right and the left that defined themselves as Ibañistas, common characteristics can be observed that allow them to be grouped within a similar ideology: statism, populism, militarism, authoritarianism, historical socialism, nationalism, presidentialism, proto-fascism, and others.

== History ==
=== Beginning and growth ===
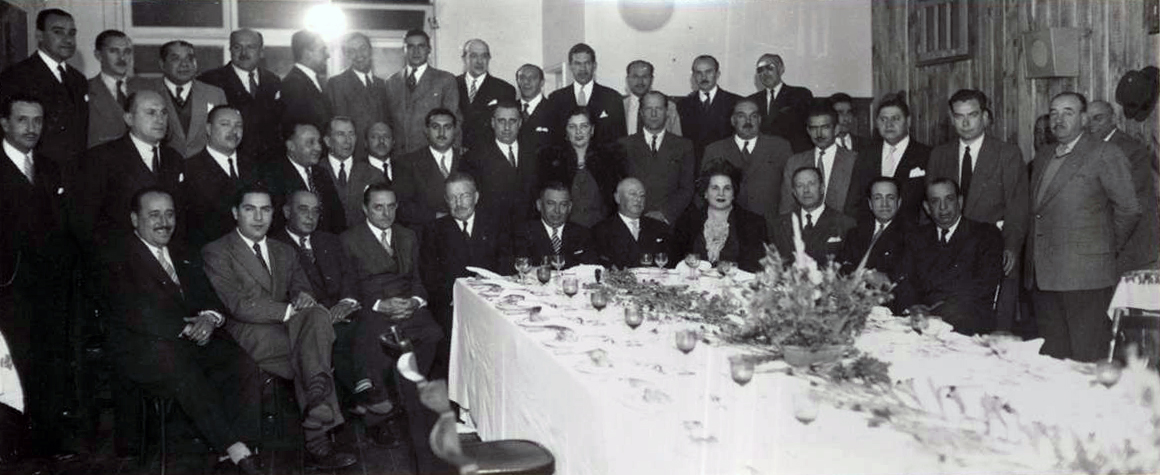
Carlos Ibáñez del Campo with the Agrarian Labor Party (PAL) in 1949.

In the 1930s, the first Ibañist groups appeared, including the Popular Freedom Alliance, which was made up of socialists and nazis. However, until 1952 no more than 12% of the popular subscribed to Ibañismo.

In 1952, Carlos Ibáñez won the presidential election, although he lacked substantial political support, save for the Agrarian Labor Party (PAL) and the Popular Socialist Party (PSP), which account for 12.5% of the electorate and 20 representatives.

The victory of Ibáñez was indicative of dissatisfaction with major political parties and disenchantment with radicalism. In the 1953 parliamentary election, Ibañists obtained 41% of the vote and 62 elected representatives, while traditional parties (Liberal Party, United Conservative Party, and the Radical Party) lost seats and votes.

=== Decline ===
The great problem of Ibañismo was that it was divided into 14 parties, among them the strongest were PSP and PAL, however these parties became increasingly disorderly and in some cases (such as the PSP) even oppositional, which ended with the loss of Ibáñez, who in the 1957 elections obtained only 20 representatives.

In the 1958 presidential election, the Ibañista movements were distributed among the different candidates. The most benefited was the Christian Democrat Eduardo Frei Montalva, who received the support of the PAL. The former PSP, reunited with the Socialist Party since 1957, supported the candidacy of Salvador Allende. The small right-wing groups, meanwhile, gathered in the Popular Command and in the Alliance of Popular Parties and Forces to support the right-wing independent Jorge Alessandri, who was elected as president.

By 1961, there was only one remaining Ibañist group, the National Democratic Party (PADENA), which from 1969 onwards did not obtain representation in the National Congress. The dissolution of Ibañismo benefited the left and Christian Democrats.

== Ibañist groups ==
- Confederación Republicana de Acción Cívica
- Popular Freedom Alliance
- Popular Socialist Vanguard
- Alianza Nacional del Pueblo
- Federación Nacional de Fuerzas Ibañistas
- Movimiento Nacional Ibañista
- Movimiento Nacional del Pueblo
- Movimiento Republicano
- Partido Femenino de Chile
- Partido Progresista Femenino
- Agrarian Labor Party
- Unión Nacional de Independientes
- Labor Party
- Partido Nacional Araucano
- Partido Nacional Cristiano
- Partido Democrático del Pueblo
- Popular Socialist Party (between 1952 and 1954)
- Partido Radical Doctrinario (between 1952 and 1956)
- Agrarian National Party
- Federación Nacional Popular
- National Party (between 1956 and 1958)
- Partido Agrario Laborista Recuperacionista (entre 1957 y 1958)
- Alliance of Popular Parties and Forces
- Popular Command
- National Popular Party (PANAPO)
- National Democratic Party (PADENA)
- National Action

== Bibliography ==
- Joaquín Fernández Abara: El Ibañismo (1937–1952). Un Caso de Populismo en la Política Chilena. Santiago, Historical Institute. Pontifical Catholic University of Chile, 2007.
- Joaquín Fernández Abara: Nacionalistas, antiliberales y reformistas. Las identidades de la militancia ibañista y su trayectoria hacia el populismo (1937–1952), en Ulianova, Olga (Editora): Redes políticas y militancias. La historia política está de vuelta. Santiago. IDEA-USACH/ Ariadna Editores, 2009.
- Gonzalo Vial Correa: Historia de Chile del Siglo XX. Suplemento de Las Últimas Noticias, 2003
