= National Democratic Agreement =

National Democratic Agreement Acuerdo Democrático Nacional
- Founded: 2 July 1984
- Dissolved: 22 June 1985
- Headquarters: Santiago, Chile
- Ideology: Conservatism; Nationalism; Anti-communism
- Political position: Centre-right to right-wing

The National Democratic Agreement (Spanish: Acuerdo Democrático Nacional, ADENA) was a Chilean political coalition existing between 1984 and 1985 that brought together parties, movements and supporters of the military dictatorship led by Augusto Pinochet.

== History ==
=== Grupo de los Ocho ===
In the context of political openness fostered by the Minister of the Interior, Sergio Onofre Jarpa, Government-supporter parties decided to join as a counterpart to the emergence of opposition forces such as the Democratic Alliance (centre-left) and the People's Democratic Movement (revolutionary left).

Originally 8 parties organised -hence its original name, the Group of Eight (Grupo de los Ocho), characterized by their heterogeneity -they range from the nationalist right to democratic socialism- but shared its legitimacy to existing institutions after the enactment of the 1980 Constitution and the defense of the coup of 1973. These parties and movements were:

- Radical Democracy (Democracia Radical, DR)
- National Action Movement (Movimiento de Acción Nacional, MAN)
- National Union Movement (Movimiento de Unión Nacional, MUN)
- Social Christian Movement (Movimiento Social Cristiano, MSC), breakaway faction of the Christian Democratic Party led by Juan de Dios Carmona and William Thayer.
- National Democratic Party (Partido Democrático Nacional, PADENA)
- National Party (Partido Nacional, PN)
- Democratic Socialist Workshops (Talleres Socialistas Democráticos, TSD), former socialist and radical militants under the leadership of Luis Ángel Santibáñez.
- Independent Democratic Union (Unión Demócrata Independiente, UDI)

=== Foundation and development ===
As expected, the lack of cohesion and consensus within the conglomerate led to the UDI, the PADENA and PN withdraw the coalition in July 1984. The remaining five members decided to meet in the National Democratic Agreement, officially constituted on 2 July with the aim of proposing the necessary reforms to allow for a peaceful transition to democracy. They chose Juan de Dios Carmona as chief of their executive committee.

ADENA proposals -also made by the Group of Eight in May of that same year- consisted of:

- Enactment of the Law on Political Parties before 1984 ended.
- Call for a plebiscite in 1985 with the purpose of consulting the public the option to call earlier for parliamentary elections (planned for 1989).
- Conducting parliamentary elections and installation of Congress in 1986.

It had its own newspaper: La Contra, which circulated with just a single trial edition on 5 September 1984. This publication described the ADENA as «a grouping of centre-right, the only party that has submitted to the government some motions designed to expedite the return to democracy through a secure and continuous process peacefully».

On September 28, 1984, the Social Democratic Workers Movement (Movimiento Obrero Socialdemócrata) and a splinter group of the PADENA led by Apollonides Parra joined the ADENA.

The categorical rejection of Pinochet to early elections and its proposed law on political parties -rejected by all sectors- led to the failure of the ADENA, which was dissolved on June 22, 1985, after the authorities lifted the state of siege in the country.
