= National Popular Party (Chile) =

Chilean right-wing political party

National Popular Party Partido Nacional Popular
- Founded: 1958
- Dissolved: 1960^{1} 1963^{2}
- Ideology: Ibañismo; Chilean nationalism Populism
- Political position: Right-wing

The National Popular Party (PANAPO) was a Chilean right-wing political party, with nationalist tendencies, that existed between 1958 and 1963.

== History ==
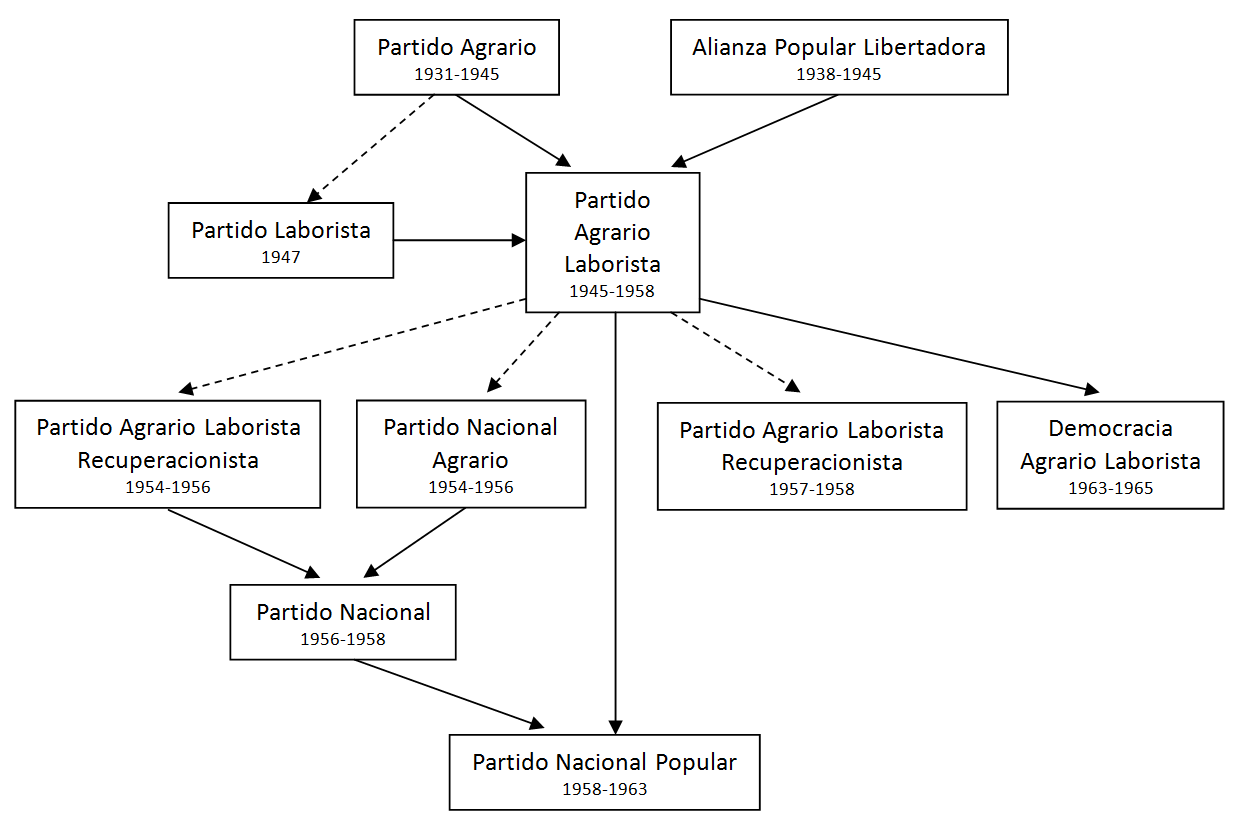
Diagrama showing the historical relationship between the Agrarian-Labor parties.

The party was founded in October 1958 by Ibañist politicians as a result of the merger of the Agrarian Labor Party and the National Party. The principle founders were Julián Echavarri, Orlando Latorre, Mario Hamuy Berr and Sergio Onofre Jarpa.

During the 1960 municipal elections, the party contributed 57 councilors, with 52,843 votes, 4.50% of total votes cast.

In April 1961, the party dissolved, with a small group joining the Christian Democratic Party, while a center-left faction merged with the National Democratic Party (Padena), which made up the left-wing coalition called the Popular Action Front (FRAP) and finally, a third right-wing group that tried to maintain the original unity without success, however the right-wing Panapo faction that supported the government of President Jorge Alessandri remained and kept the name.

In 1963 the National Popular Party dissolved and the majority of its members joined the ranks of the National Action party, founded by Jorge Prat Echaurren and Sergio Onofre Jarpa, with a nationalist and right-wing political tendency.

== Electoral results ==
=== Municipal elections ===
Election	Votes	% of votes	Regidores
1960	52 843		57 / 1,558
