= Manuel Hormazábal González =

Chilean geodesist, colonel, and writer

Chargé d'affaires in the Federal Republic of Germany
- In office 1953–1959
- President: Carlos Ibáñez del Campo

Deputy Director of the Military Geographic Institute
- In office 1930–1939
- President: Carlos Ibáñez del Campo

Personal details
- Born: June 4, 1900 Talcahuano, Chile
- Died: 1987 (aged 86–87) Santiago, Chile
- Party: Agrarian Labor Party
- Spouse: María Alicia Amanda Burotto Urzúa
- Relatives: Guillermo (brother)
- Education: French Army Geographic Service; Prussian Geodetic Institute
- Occupation: Geodesist, soldier, writer, university professor, advisor, and ambassador
- Known for: Works about the Borders of Chile
- Awards: Cross of the Order of Merit of the Federal Republic of Germany Commander of the Order of Vasco Núñez de Balboa

Military service
- Allegiance: Chile
- Branch/service: Chilean Army
- Years of service: 1918-1939
- Rank: Colonel
- Battles/wars: Ariostazo

Manuel Hormazábal González (June 4, 1900 – c. 1987) was a Chilean geodesist, colonel, and writer, known for his contributions to the study of Chile's borders and his involvement with the Agrarian Labor Party and Ibañismo, participating in the Ariostazo. As a colonel in the Chilean Army, he held diplomatic roles, including chargé d'affaires (ambassador) in the Federal Republic of Germany between 1953 and 1959, and advised the governments of Honduras and Panama. He published numerous works on territorial disputes with Argentina and other historical and political topics related to Borders of Chile.

== Career ==
Hormazábal joined the Chilean Army, reaching the rank of colonel. He graduated from the Military Academy in 1918 as a Second Lieutenant in the 1st Infantry Regiment "Buin". Throughout his military career, he served in the Non-Commissioned Officers School, the Military Academy, and the 8th Mountain Detachment "Tucapel", concluding his military service in 1939.

His work focused on the field of Chile's borders, contributing to technical studies on territorial boundaries. Following the Seguro Obrero massacre in 1938, Hormazábal testified to the discontent manifested in both the Military Academy and the General Staff, leading to an open conspiracy. The center of the unrest shifted to the First Division, which was reportedly ready to revolt until the approval of the Army's staffing law, which generated numerous promotions, calmed the revolutionary spirit. All indications suggest that General Fuentes was behind the conspiracy. Apart from Hormazábal González's account, no other testimony remains regarding the agitation within the Army after the massacre.

He served as deputy director of the Military Geographic Institute between 1930 and 1939, during which he held all managerial positions and also taught various technical subjects. For a time, starting on May 13, 1936, he was absent from the country on a study trip to Germany.

He was educated at the French Army Geographic Service and the Prussian Geodetic Institute in Potsdam, where he gained expertise in cartography, photogrammetry, and geodesy, earning the title of geographic engineer upon completing his studies. He was the first Chilean officer sent by the government to specialize in the then-emerging discipline of aerial photogrammetry, which allowed him to further his training in Germany, France, Austria, Italy, and Switzerland. Thanks to his European training, he participated as Chile's official delegate at the International Geodesy Assembly held in Edinburgh, Scotland, in 1936 and the International Photogrammetry Congress held in Berlin, Germany, in 1937. Between September 1935 and 1939, he served as director of the Academy of Topography and Geodesy, as chief technical officer in Geodesy and Topography.

In 1939, he was interrogated as a former officer due to his involvement in the Ariostazo and was sentenced to three years of confinement in Lima, Peru.

Between 1940 and 1942, he worked as an attaché in the Secretariat of War, Navy, and Aviation, served as a military advisor to the government of Honduras, and taught geodesy and astronomy at the National Autonomous University of Honduras in Tegucigalpa. During his stay in Honduras, the National Assembly approved various military organic laws, and the government issued regulations of the same nature, which he was tasked with drafting. He resigned when Honduras declared war on Germany, at a time when Chile still maintained neutrality. In 1943 and 1944, he served as a technical advisor to the arbitrator in the Boundary Commission between Panama and Costa Rica following the Echandi-Fernández treaty between the two countries.

He was a member of the Agrarian Labor Party, serving as president of the party in Las Condes, and supported Ibañismo and Chilean nationalism.

Subsequently, between 1953 and 1959, he served as chargé d'affaires in the Federal Republic of Germany, by which time he was already married.

In 1965, he was appointed Chile's official delegate and member of the Chilean Boundary Commission tasked with studying the Laguna del Desierto dispute, but he resigned from his positions, believing that the instructions given to the Chilean delegation by the Ministry of Foreign Affairs would weaken Chile's stance. For him, the border should have been established without the need for new cartographic studies. He also wrote to President Eduardo Frei Montalva, who had appointed him as a "government delegate," in a letter dated August 20, 1970:

I believe that resolving this controversy will become increasingly difficult, because when it first arose, Chile occupied all the previously indicated territory and exercised sovereignty there. Now, according to my information, things have changed, as our Carabineros have reduced their range of action to the northern part of Laguna del Desierto, near Lake O'Higgins, leaving the rest of that Chilean territory, which Argentina claims, as a no-man's land, along which Argentina's Gendarmerie likely makes surreptitious incursions.

== Works ==
Hormazábal González was a prolific author on topics of territorial history, boundary disputes, and Chilean politics. His works focus on defending Chile's territorial integrity against Argentine claims and analyzing key historical periods.

- El problema del levantamiento aéreo y la organización de los servicios del levantamiento de la carta. (1929)
- Tabla de logaritmos a cinco decimales (con apéndice y explicaciones) (1943)
- El problema del levantamiento de la carta del territorio.
- Berlín, encrucijada del mundo.
- Palena y California. Tierras chilenas. (Estudio técnico de un problema limítrofe.) (1961)
- Palena y California, tierras chilenas. (Second edition.) (1965)
- Chile frente a Argentina en la controversia ya centenaria de sus límites (1968)
- Chile, una patria mutilada. (1969)
- Cuando la sangre regó la tierra visión crítica de la Segunda Guerra Mundial. (1973)
- El Canal de “Beagle” es territorio chileno. (1977)
- ¡Dialogando con Argentina! 1819-1978. (Síntesis histórica de las desmembraciones territoriales de Chile.) (1979)
- Breve historia de los tratados de 1856 y 1881. (1984)
- Por los caminos de la democracia 1920-1940. (1989)

== Honors ==
For his service in the Army and his diplomatic work abroad, he received several distinctions, including the Grand Cross of the Order of Merit of the Federal Republic of Germany and the Commander's Cross of the Order of Vasco Núñez de Balboa, awarded by the Government of Panama.

== See also ==
- Alto Palena–Encuentro River dispute
- Beagle conflict
- Laguna del Desierto dispute
- Borders of Chile
- Corporation for the Defense of Sovereignty
- Ibañismo
- Seguro Obrero massacre
- Military Geographic Institute (Chile)
- California Valley, Chile
