= 1959 Chilean senatorial by-election =

- January 11, 1959
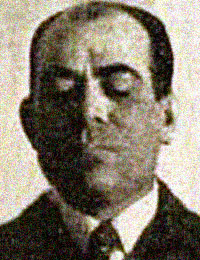

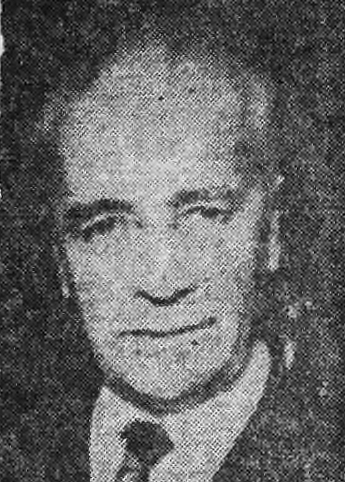
| Candidate | Roberto Wachholtz | Humberto Mewes Bruna |
| Party | Radical | Labour |
| Popular vote | 190,492 | 161,368 |
| Percentage | 52.67% | 44.62% |

A senatorial by-election was held in Chile on January 11, 1959, to fill a vacant Senate seat for the province of Santiago after the incumbent Jorge Alessandri vacated the seat by being elected president. The election was called by a decree publicized on December 2, 1958.

== Candidates ==
The United Conservative Party (PCU) nominated Jaime Egaña Baraona on December 2, 1958, however he declined the nomination. The Alliance of Popular Parties and Forces—made up of the National Agrarian, Radical Doctrinarian, Republic, Social Christian, National People's Movement, Democratic, National Labor Union and Popular Independent Action parties—supported the pre-candidacy of Humberto Pinto Diaz, that did not materialize.

The Popular Action Front (FRAP) initially nominated Clotario Blest, Guillermo del Pedregal and Francisco Cuevas Mackenna. On the morning of December 17 they agreed to nominated Humberto Mewes Bruno as their candidate.

The parties under the "parliamentary center bloc" had a list of precandidates in mid-December 1958:

- Radical Party (PR): Humberto Enríquez, Jacobo Schaulsohn, Juvenal Hernández, Raúl Rettig and Pedro Enrique Alfonso.
- Christian Democratic Party (PDC): Bernardo Leighton
- National Popular Party (PANAPO): Rafael de la Presa, Jaime Sanfuentes, Orlando Latorre, Alejandro Hales and Julio Barrenechea.
- Democratic Party (PDo): Juan Pradenas Muñoz and Luis Minchel
- Democratic Socialist Party (PSD): Juan Garafulic.

The PR insisted on the candidacy of Raúl Rettig, while the PANAPO nominated Rafael de la Presa —who also had the support of the PDC. On December 20, Rettig resigned from the ballot, and the breakup of the center bloc occurred when the PR registered the candidacy of Roberto Wachholtz on December 22, the last day of the legal deadline to submit applications, while Rafael de la Presa resigned his candidacy.

The Liberal Party (PL) nominated Mariano Puga Vega on December 14, who accepted the nomination.

== Campaign ==
On December 24, the director of the Electoral Registry, Óscar Rojas Astaburuaga, drew lots to place the candidates on the single voting card, which was being used for the first time in a parliamentary election, leaving Roberto Wachholtz in first place, followed by Humberto Mewes and Mariano Puga. Around 530,000 citizens were eligible to vote in the election.

On December 26, the Alliance of Popular Parties and Forces agreed to support Wachholtz's candidacy. The Christian Democratic Party agreed to give freedom of action to its members in the election, while the United Conservative Party accused that the liberal candidacy of Mariano Puga Vega found little support in its community, which led to the December 29 Both the PCU and the PL agreed to withdraw their support for Puga's candidacy and give it to Wachholtz's candidacy. Since the ballots had already begun to be printed, it was impossible to eliminate the name of the liberal candidate and it appeared for those who wished to give him their preference.

== Results ==
| Candidate | Party | Votes | % |
|---|---|---|---|
| Roberto Wachholtz | Radical Party | 190,492 | 52.67 |
| Humberto Mewes Bruna | Labour Party | 161,368 | 44.62 |
| Mariano Puga Vega | Liberal Party | 9,781 | 2.70 |
| Total | | 361,641 | 100.00 |
| Valid votes | | 361,641 | 95.04 |
| Invalid votes | | 11,795 | 3.10 |
| Blank votes | | 7,095 | 1.86 |
| Total votes | | 380,531 | 100.00 |
| Registered voters/turnout | | 539,925 | 70.48 |
Source: La Nación

== Aftermath ==
Roberto Wachholtz was inducted as senator on March 11, 1959.
