= Black Nazi =

Black Nazi may refer to:

- Morenazi, a term describing non-white neo-Nazis
- Mark Robinson (American politician), an American politician who identified as a "Black Nazi" and voiced support for Adolf Hitler.
