= 1961 Chilean parliamentary election =

Parliamentary elections were held in Chile on 5 March 1961. The Radical Party remained the largest party in the Chamber of Deputies and also became the largest party in the Senate.

== Electoral system ==
The term length for Senators was eight years, with around half of the Senators elected every four years. This election saw 24 of the 45 Senate seats up for election.

== Results ==
=== Senate ===
Party	Votes	%	Seats	
Party	Votes	%	Won	Total
Radical Party	146,373	23.79	7	13
Liberal Party	103,688	16.85	6	9
Christian Democratic Party	90,211	14.66	1	4
Socialist Party	83,456	13.56	4	7
United Conservative Party	79,303	12.89	2	5
Communist Party	75,123	12.21	3	3
National Democratic Party	17,325	2.82	0	0
National Vanguard of the People	17,299	2.81	1	1
Democrat Party	2,594	0.42	0	0
Independents			–	3
Total	615,372	100.00	24	45
Valid votes	615,372	96.20		
Invalid/blank votes	24,335	3.80		
Total votes	639,707	100.00		
Registered voters/turnout	847,505	75.48		
Source: Nohlen, Whelan

=== Chamber of Deputies ===
Party	Votes	%	Seats	+/–
Radical Party	296,828	22.15	39	+3
Liberal Party	222,485	16.60	28	–2
Christian Democratic Party	213,468	15.93	23	+4
United Conservative Party	198,260	14.80	17	–4
Communist Party	157,572	11.76	16	New
Socialist Party	149,122	11.13	12	+5
National Democratic Party	95,179	7.10	12	New
Labour National Union	3,394	0.25	0	New
Democrat Party	772	0.06	0	–5
Popular Command	96	0.01	0	New
Independents	2,720	0.20	0	–2
Total	1,339,896	100.00	147	0
Valid votes	1,339,896	96.70		
Invalid/blank votes	45,780	3.30		
Total votes	1,385,676	100.00		
Registered voters/turnout	1,858,980	74.54		
Source: Nohlen
