= Víctor García Garzena =

Chilean lawyer (1913–1986)

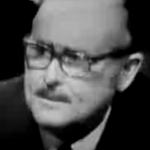
- García Garzena in 1973

Member of the Senate of Chile
- In office 15 June 1969 – 21 September 1973
- Succeeded by: Dissolution of the Congress (1973 military coup)
- Constituency: O'Higgins and Colchagua Province

Personal details
- Born: 22 September 1913 Vina del Mar, Chile
- Died: 13 August 1986 (aged 72) Santiago, Chile
- Party: National Party (1966–1973); National Union Movement (1983)
- Education: Pontifical Catholic University of Chile (LLB)
- Occupation: Politician
- Profession: Lawyer

Víctor Joaquín García Garzena (22 September 1913 – 13 August 1986) was a Chilean lawyer and politician who served as a Senator.

Garzena is well remembered in his country due to a debate he had in 1973 with the then-University of Chile Student Federation president Alejandro Rojas Wainer, who was a member of the Communist Party in 1973. That debate was recorded by Patricio Guzmán's documentary film The Battle of Chile.

== Early life ==
In 1937, Garzena graduated as a lawyer from the Pontifical Catholic University of Chile (PUC). Then, he participated in the elaboration of the Organic Code of Courts.

== Political career ==
Garzena was one of the founders of the National Party in 1966, being its first president (1966−1968).

In 1967, he was a candidate for a seat in the Senate in the 1967 Complementary Elections for O'Higgins and Colchagua Province, but lost the election. However, in 1969, Garzena was elected senator for the same area. During the 1969−1973 period, he was a fierce opponent of Salvador Allende.

In 1983, he was one of the founders of the National Union Movement, the forerunner of the Renovación Nacional party.
