= Populism in Latin America =

Populism refers to a range of political stances that emphasise the idea of "the people" and often juxtapose this group against "the elite". This article focuses on populism in Latin America.

Latin America has been claimed to have the world's "most enduring and prevalent populist tradition" with both left-wing populists and right-wing populists achieving historical and current-day electoral success in many Latin American nations. This has been argued to be because Latin America is a region with a long tradition of democratic governance and free elections, but with high rates of socio-economic inequality, generating widespread resentments that politicians can articulate through populism.

== History ==
=== First Wave (1930s–1960s) ===
The first wave of Latin American populism began at the start of the Great Depression in 1929 and last until the end of the 1960s. The 1973 Chilean coup d'état which overthrew Salvador Allende's socialist government is seen as the end of the populist era. In various countries, politicians took power while emphasising "the people": these included Getúlio Vargas in Brazil, Juan Perón in Argentina, and José María Velasco Ibarra in Ecuador. These relied on the Americanismo ideology, presenting a common identity across Latin America and denouncing any interference from imperialist powers.

Populism has been an important force in Latin American political history, where many charismatic leaders have emerged since the beginning of the 20th century, as the paramountcy of agrarian oligarchies had been dislocated by the onset of industrial capitalism, allowing for the emergence of an industrial bourgeoisie and the activation of an urban working class, causing the emergence of reformist and multi-class nationalist politics, centered on a charismatic leadership, such as Aprismo founded by Víctor Raúl Haya de la Torre, and Juan Velasco Alvarado (1968–1975) in Peru, Germán Busch (1936–1939), Gualberto Villarroel (1943–1946) and the MNR and later Juan José Torres (1970–1971) in Bolivia, the Socialist Party of Chile (before adopting a more Marxist line and distancing from APRA) and the political movements gravitating around Perón (1946–1955, 1973–1974) concentrated in the Justicialist Party in Argentina, Carlos Ibáñez del Campo's movement in Chile (1927–1931, 1952–1958), Getúlio Vargas' Brazilian Labour Party (1930–1945, 1951–1954) and Adhemar de Barros's Social Progressive Party in Brazil, Jorge Eliécer Gaitán's National Leftist Revolutionary Union and Gustavo Rojas Pinilla's National Popular Alliance (1953–1957) in Colombia, Rafael Ángel Calderón Guardia's movement (1940–1944) and José Figueres Ferrer's National Liberation Party (throughout the 1940s and 1970s) in Costa Rica, Ramón Grau's Partido Auténtico in Cuba (1933–1934, 1944–1948), Juan Bosch's Dominican Revolutionary Party (1963), Assad Bucaram's Concentration of People's Forces, Velasco Ibarra's National Velascist Federation (throughout the 1930s to 1960s) and Guillermo Rodríguez (1972–1976) in Ecuador,Revolutionary Action Party in Guatemala (1944–1954), the Institutional Revolutionary Party under Lázaro Cárdenas (1934–1940) and under Luis Echeverría (1970–1976) in Mexico, Omar Torrijos's Democratic Revolutionary Party (1968–1981) in Panama, Rafael Franco (1936–1937) and his Febreristas in Paraguay and Democratic Action under Rómulo Betancourt (1945–1948, 1959–1964) and Carlos Andrés Pérez (1974–1979) in Venezuela. Which parties and movements are "national-populist" remains disputed. Óscar Osorio (1948–1956) created the Revolutionary Party of Democratic Unification in El Salvador modeled after the Mexican PRI but his regime reversed many reforms in face of a "communist threat" and Fulgencio Batista started off populist. Ideologically, Latin American populism, with its emphasis on nation-building under an authoritarian leadership as a prerequisite for technological modernization, betrayed the earlier influence of Comtean positivism. Socially, for many authors—such as Brazil's Octavio Ianni—populism should be understood as the political alliance between an emerging industrial bourgeoisie and a newly organizing urban working class, in which the former accepts social reforming for the latter's sake as long as the working class remains politically subordinated to both a more or less authoritarian State and private enterprise, in a process of controlled inclusion of the "masses" into the political system, a co-opting process some Marxist authors like Brazil's Francisco Weffort ascertain was accepted by the newly urbanized working class given their lack of a previously developed class consciousness. Even though many of these national-populist parties or their successors like Bolivian Revolutionary Left Movement or Brazilian Democratic Labour Party joined the Socialist International they did not define themselves as socialist or social democratic but they were social-reform-oriented. They came to power through coup d'états presented as revolutions like the Mexican Revolution (1911–1920), Brazilian Revolution of 1930, Cuban Revolution of 1933, Paraguayan February Revolution of 1936, Bolivian Socialist Revolution of 1936, 1943 Argentine Revolution, Guatemalan Revolution (1944), Venezuelan October Revolution of 1945, Costa Rican Revolution of 1948, Salvadoran Revolution of 1948, Bolivian National Revolution of 1952, Dominican April Revolution of 1965 (failed), Peruvian Revolution of 1968 and the Panamanian Revolution of 1968.

first wave populist governments

Despite efforts to charter an ideological pedigree to Populism in Latin America, as has been attempted by some, working, e.g., with concepts taken from Perón's Third Position, Latin American countries have not always had a clear and consistent political ideology under populism. Populist practitioners and movements in Latin America usually adapt politically to the prevailing mood of the nation, moving within the ideological spectrum from left to right many times during their political lives. If populist movements in 1930s and 1940s Latin America had apparent fascist overtones and based themselves on authoritarian politics, as was the case of Vargas' Estado Novo dictatorship in Brazil (1937–1945), or of some of Peron's openly expressed sympathies, in the 1950s populism adapted—not without considerable unease from its political leadership—to heightened levels of working-class mobilization. Therefore, it is not surprising that 1960s populism was associated mainly with radical, left-leaning petty-bourgeois nationalism, which emptied the State of its function as a coercive class-rule apparatus and saw it instead as an organ of representation of the Nation as a whole. Such was the case, for instance, of the Goulart government (1961–1964) in Brazil, Goulart being described as a fiery populist who identified—mainly rhetorically—with the dispossessed and tried to foster a reformist agenda through ties to the organized Left. The fact that Goulart was eventually ousted by the military shows that, in the views of some authors, other populist leaders of the time faced a jeopardy: they were reformists who, in the pursuit of their agenda, had to encourage popular mobilization and class conflict they ultimately abhorred. Consequently, populism was eventually identified by the 1970s military dictatorships as "demagogery" and as a risk to the stability of the existing social order.

In some countries, Populism has been fiscally supported in Latin America during periods of growth such as the 1950s and 1960s and during commodity price booms such as in oil and precious metals. Political leaders could gather followers among the popular classes with broad redistributive programs during these boom times. Conversely, in others countries, Populism has been historically associated with countering the relative decline of export agriculture with deficit spending and import-substitution policies aimed at developing an internal market for industrial consumer goods. Populism in Latin America has been sometimes criticized for the fiscal policies of many of its leaders, but has also been defended for having allowed historically weak states to alleviate disorder and achieve a tolerable degree of stability while initiating large-scale industrialization. Though populist fiscal and monetary policies, called macroeconomic populism, has been criticized by economists, who see in it the ultimately dysfunctional subordination of economic policy to political goals, some authors acknowledge populism to have allowed non-radical leaders and parties to co-opt the radical ideas of the masses so as to redirect them in a non-revolutionary direction. It's generally regarded that populists hope "to reform the system, not to overthrow it".

=== Second Wave (1990s) ===
The second wave took place in the early 1990s. In the late 1980s, many Latin American states were experiencing economic crisis and several populist figures were elected by blaming the elites for this situation. Examples include Carlos Menem in Argentina, Fernando Collor de Mello in Brazil, and Alberto Fujimori in Peru. Once in power, these individuals pursued neoliberal economic strategies recommended by the International Monetary Fund (IMF), stabilizing the economy and ending hyperinflation. Unlike the first wave, the second did not include an emphasis on Americanismo or anti-imperialism. They are called neo-populists.

If "left", reformist and nationalist populism never died out altogether during the 1970s Latin American military dictatorships—as offered proof by the prompt and successful return of a populist like Brazil's Leonel Brizola to electoral politics in the early 1980s—a different streak of populism appeared in the post-military dictatorship era. This 1990s populism, in the persons of leaders like Argentina's Carlos Menem or Brazil's Fernando Collor, adapted itself to prevailing neoliberal policies of economic adjustment, setting aside nationalistic reforms and retaining the need for charismatic leadership policies, mass support and a concern for the plight of the "common people".

=== Third Wave (2000s to 2010s) ===
The third wave began in the final years of the 1990s and continued into the 21st century. Like the first wave, the third made heavy use of Americanismo and anti-imperialism, although this time these themes presented alongside an explicitly socialist program that opposed the free market. Prominent examples included Hugo Chávez in Venezuela, Evo Morales in Bolivia, Rafael Correa in Ecuador, Nestor Kirchner and Cristina Fernández de Kirchner in Argentina, and Daniel Ortega in Nicaragua. These socialist populist governments have presented themselves as giving sovereignty "back to the people", in particular through the formation of constituent assemblies that would draw up new constitutions, which could then be ratified via referendums.

In the 1990s and 2000s, with the emergence of Hugo Chávez in Venezuela—albeit Chavez refuses himself to be labelled as "populist"—reformist and nationalism Latin American populism has resurfaced with new patterns, as what is called by some authors socialist populism that appeals to masses of poor by promising redistributive policies and state control of the nation's energy resources—a blueprint that had already appeared, however—albeit with no openly "socialist" rhetoric, viz., in the nationalist policies—including the launch of the State-owned oil-company Petrobrás—that were the hallmark of Vargas' second term as Brazil's democratically elected president (1951–1954) and that led to his eventual suicide.

Often adapting a nationalist vocabulary and rhetorically convincing manner, populism was used to appeal to broad masses while remaining ideologically ambivalent. Notwithstanding, there have been notable exceptions. 21st-century Latin-American populist leaders have had a decidedly—even if mostly rhetorical—socialist bent.

When populists take strong positions on economic philosophies such as capitalism versus socialism, the position sparks strong emotional responses regarding how best to manage the nation's current and future social and economic position. Mexico's 2006 Presidential election was hotly debated among supporters and opponents of populist candidate Andrés Manuel López Obrador.

=== Fourth Wave (2010s and 2020s) ===
In the late 2010s and 2020s, there was a rise of right-wing populist movements. These include Jair Bolsonaro (President of Brazil 2019–2023), Nayib Bukele (President of El Salvador since 2019), Javier Milei (President of Argentina since 2023), José Antonio Kast (President of Chile since 2023), Abelardo de la Espriella (President of Columbia since 2026), and Keiko Fujimori (President of Peru since 2026).

== Inequality ==
Populism in Latin American countries has both an economic and an ideological edge. Populism in Latin America has mostly addressed the problem, not of capitalist economic development as such but rather the problems caused by its lack of inclusiveness, in the backdrop of highly unequal societies in which people are divided between very small groups of wealthy individuals and masses of poor, even in the case of societies such as Argentina, where strong and educated middle classes are a significant segment of the population. Therefore, the key role of the State in Latin American populism, as an institution, is to mediate between traditional elites and the "people" in general. In appealing to the masses of poor people prior to gaining power, populists may promise widely demanded food, housing, employment, basic social services, and income redistribution. Once in political power, they may not always be financially or politically able to fulfill all these promises. However, they are very often successful in providing many broad and basic services in the short term.

== Populist socialism ==
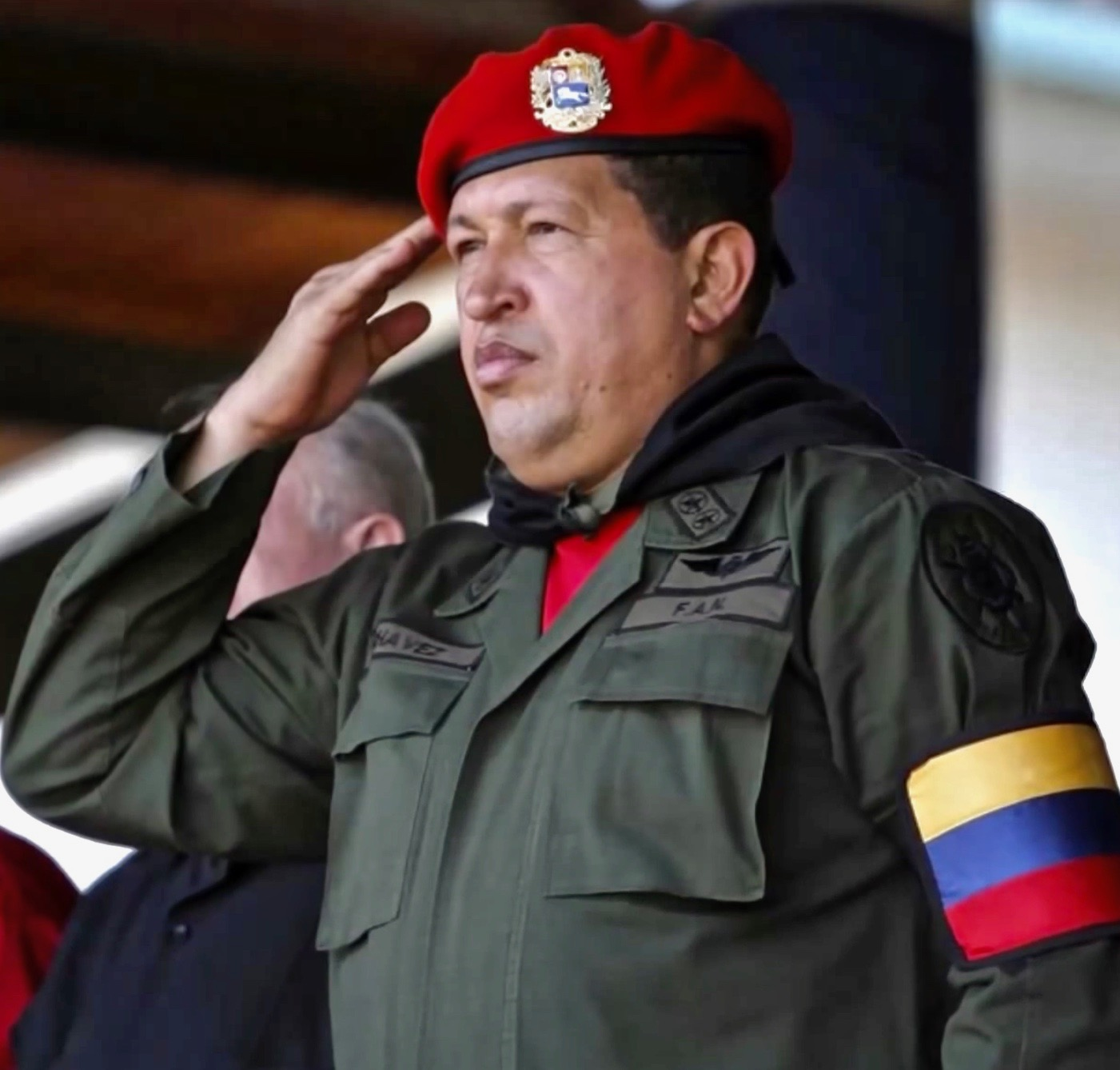
Hugo Chávez, founder of the PSUV and former President of Venezuela

Populism has remained a significant force in Latin America. Populism has recently been reappearing on the left with promises of far-reaching socialist changes as seen in Venezuela under Hugo Chávez, in Bolivia under Evo Morales, and Mexico under Andrés Manuel López Obrador—a process, however, seen by some as contradictory as it tries to meld the populist traditional celebration of folk wisdom and charismatic leadership with doctrinaire socialism. The Venezuelan government often spars verbally with the United States and accuses it of attempting to overthrow Chávez after supporting a failed coup against him. Chávez had been one of the most outspoken and blunt critics of US foreign policy. Nevertheless, a large commodity trade continues between Venezuela and the US because of the economic constraints of oil delivery and the proximity of the two countries.

When Hugo Chávez took power in Venezuela nearly 20 years ago, the leftist populism he championed was supposed to save democracy. Instead, it has led to democracy's implosion in the country...

— The New York Times, April 2017

Because populist tradition ascertains the paramountcy of the "people" (instead of class) as a political subject, it suffices to say that, in the 21st century, the large numbers of voters living in extreme poverty in Latin America has remained a bastion of support for new populist candidates. By early 2008 governments with varying forms of populism and with some form of left leaning (albeit vague) social democratic or democratic socialist platform had come to dominate virtually all Latin American nations with the exceptions of Colombia, El Salvador and Mexico. This political shift includes both more developed nations such as Argentina's Front for Victory and Chile's Socialist Party, and smaller income countries like Bolívia with its Movement towards Socialism and Paraguay with the Patriotic Alliance for Change. Even in middle-income Mexico, a populist candidate like López Obrador, albeit defeated, nevertheless appeared as part of a strong neopopulist reaction. Nevertheless, populist candidates have been more successful in poorer Latin American countries such as Bolivia (under Morales), Ecuador (under Rafael Correa) and Nicaragua (under Daniel Ortega). By the use of broad grassroots movements populist groups have managed to gain power from better organized, funded and entrenched groups such as the Bolivian Nationalist Democratic Action and the Paraguayan Colorado Party. Some people see also parallels with the Workers' Party in Brazil, with President Luiz Inácio Lula da Silva and his successor Dilma Rousseff, that used the state controlled oil company Petrobras to illegally fund their party, big companies, and politicians, while at the same time used populism strategies to get good results on the polls and elections.

Former President Jair Bolsonaro, considered a far-right leader, also has populist tendencies. While there are varying interpretations of Bolsonaro's political motives, one key explanation is the attitude of the people themselves. Brazilians, especially those in lower classes, tend to lean more conservative. Tolerance of social injustice, limited demands, and resistance to ‘political mobilization’ result in the tolerance of these populist tendencies and tones.

Countries in Latin America with high rates of poverty, whose governments maintain and support unpopular privatizations and more orthodox economic policies that do not deliver general societal gains, are under pressure from populist politicians and movements accusing them of benefiting the upper and upper-middle classes and of being allied to foreign and business interests.

== See also ==
- Democracy in Latin America and the Caribbean
- Ethnocacerism
- Morenazi
- Personalismo
