= Social Christian Movement =

Social Christian Movement Movimiento Social Cristiano
- Founded: December 1983
- Dissolved: 29 April 1987
- Merged into: National Renewal
- Headquarters: Santiago de Chile
- Ideology: Christian democracy
- Political position: Centre to Centre-right

Social Christian Movement (Spanish: Movimiento Social Cristiano, MSC) was a Chilean political party existing during the 1980s, formed mainly by dissidents of the Christian Democratic Party (PDC).

== History ==
The first signs of former Christian Democratic militants and leaders meeting to adhere to the military dictatorship of Augusto Pinochet appeared in 1980, when a group of them called to vote favorably on the constitutional referendum of that year.

The movement was founded in December 1983 by Juan de Dios Carmona, after having returned from Spain after serving functions as Chilean ambassador to that country. It also joined William Thayer Arteaga, who had been expelled from PDC for supporting the military regime, as leader of the MSC, and sought to bring together those who followed the Social Christian postulates. Among its founders were also the former deputies Santiago Gajardo, Ana Rodríguez and Blanca Retamal.

In 1984 it joined the Group of Eight, a coalition of parties and movements supporting the government, which on July 2 it became the National Democratic Agreement (ADENA). On January 31, 1986, it constituted the Frente Democrático de Concordia (FREDECO) along with the Social Democracy Party, the Radical Democracy, the National Democratic Party (faction led by Apolonides Parra), the Radical Civic Union, the Social Democratic Labour Movement, the Javiera Carrera Movement and Arturo Matte Civic Center.

On 27 August 1986 the party announced its inclusion in the National Labour Front (FNT) led by former Interior Minister Sergio Onofre Jarpa, which was later one of the founding groups of National Renewal (RN).
