= Francisco Bulnes Sanfuentes =

Chilean politician (1917–1999)

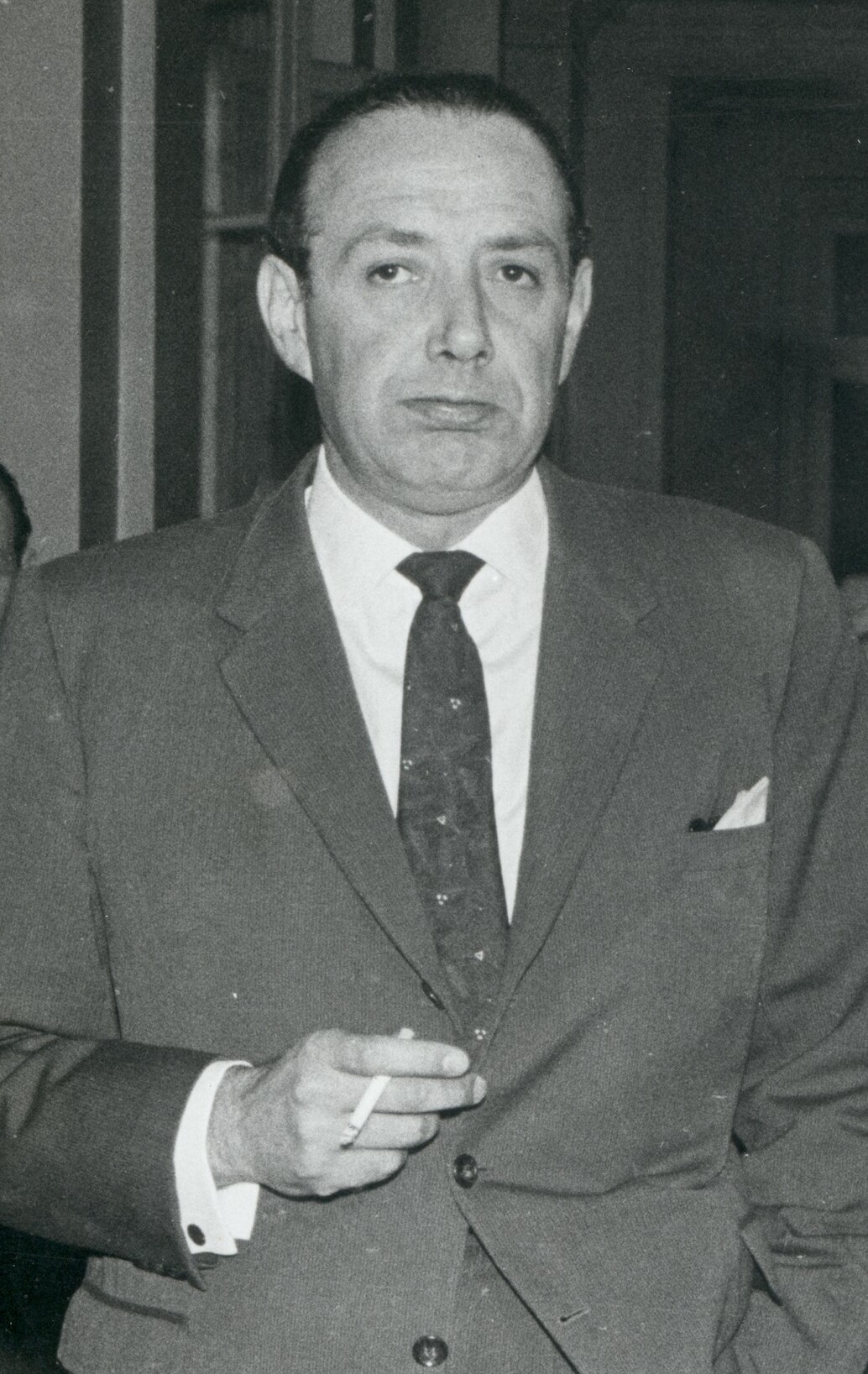

Member of the Senate of Chile
- In office 15 May 1969 – 21 September 1973
- Succeeded by: Dissolution of the Congress (1973 military coup)
- Constituency: 7th Provincial Agrupation (Ñuble, Concepción and Arauco)
- In office 15 May 1953 – 15 May 1969
- Constituency: 5th Provincial Agrupation (O'Higgins and Colchagua Province)

Member of the Chamber of Deputies of Chile
- In office 15 May 1945 – 15 May 1953
- Constituency: 10th Departamental Agrupation (San Fernando and Santa Cruz)

Personal details
- Born: 8 August 1917 Vina del Mar, Chile
- Died: 28 October 1999 (aged 82) Santiago, Chile
- Party: Conservative Party (1935–1949); Traditional Conservative Party (1949–1953); United Conservative Party (1953–1966); National Party (1966–1973); National Union Movement (1984−1987); Renovación Nacional (1987–1999)
- Spouse: Elisa Ripamonti
- Children: Seven
- Parent(s): Francisco Bulnes Correa; Blanca Sanfuentes
- Education: Pontifical Catholic University of Chile (LLB)
- Occupation: Politician
- Profession: Lawyer

Francisco Bulnes Sanfuentes (8 August 1917 – 28 October 1999) was a Chilean lawyer and politician.

He served as Ambassador to Peru in the 1970s, being declared persona non grata by de facto leader Francisco Morales Bermúdez in 1978 following a spying scandal that ended with the execution of Air Force NCO Julio Vargas Garayar in January 1979, being this the last person to be executed in Peru to date.

== Early life and education ==
Francisco Bulnes Sanfuentes was born on 8 August 1917 in Santiago. A member of the Pinto family, Bulnes was the son of deputy Diego Francisco Bulnes Correa and Blanca Sanfuentes Echazarreta, and a grandson and great-grandson of former presidents of Chile. His public profile was frequently linked to this lineage, which connected him to several prominent national figures.

He completed his primary and secondary studies at the German School of Santiago and later enrolled at the Pontifical Catholic University of Chile, where he earned a law degree on 7 December 1939. He was licensed in legal and social sciences by the same university. Before qualifying as a lawyer, he worked at COPEC as assistant secretary in 1936 and later as general secretary. Between 1942 and 1943, he served as an assistant professor at the Faculty of Law of his alma mater while also practising law.

== Political career ==
Bulnes joined the Conservative Party in 1935 and held several internal leadership positions, including president of the Conservative Student Centre in 1937 and later national president of the party’s youth wing between 1941 and 1943. He was elected deputy for the 10th Departmental District (San Fernando and Santa Cruz) in 1945 and re-elected in 1949, serving until 1953. During this period, he participated in commissions dealing with constitutional affairs, foreign relations, finance, and other legislative matters.

In 1953, he was elected senator for the 5th Provincial Group (O’Higgins and Colchagua), a seat he retained through successive re-elections until 1973. As senator, he was active in commissions on constitution, legislation and justice, foreign affairs, public health, education, economy, and other areas, and he represented Chile at several interparliamentary conferences abroad between 1963 and 1969. In 1966, he participated in the founding of the National Party alongside other right-wing leaders.

His parliamentary tenure ended in 1973 with the dissolution of Congress following the military coup. He was later appointed Chilean ambassador to Peru in 1975, serving until tensions between the two countries led to the termination of his mission. Upon returning to Chile, he joined the Council of State and in 1982 acted as an adviser to the Ministry of Foreign Affairs.

In August 1985, he was among the signatories of the National Accord for the Transition to Full Democracy. He later contributed to the creation of the Movimiento de Unión Nacional and became one of the founding members of Renovación Nacional in 1987, remaining active in the party until his death.

Bulnes was elected to the Academia Chilena de Ciencias Sociales, Políticas y Morales on 7 May 1986, delivering an inaugural address titled "El senado en las constituciones de 1925 y 1980". He was regarded as a prominent orator in Parliament and a leading figure within Chilean conservatism.

== Death ==
Bulnes died in Santiago on 28 October 1999. After his death, the Senate convened to pay tribute to him, highlighting his long public service and legislative career. Contemporary commentary described him as one of the most influential figures on the Chilean right during the second half of the twentieth century.
