= 1957 Chilean parliamentary election =

Parliamentary elections were held in Chile on 3 March 1957. The Radical Party emerged as the largest party in the Chamber of Deputies, winning 36 of the 147 seats.

== Results ==
Party	Votes	%	Seats	+/–
Radical Party	188,526	21.47	36	+18
Liberal Party	134,741	15.34	30	+7
United Conservative Party	121,223	13.80	21	–
National Falange	82,710	9.42	17	+14
Agrarian Labor Party	68,602	7.81	10	–16
Popular Socialist Party	55,004	6.26	5	–15
Democratic Party	44,213	5.03	5	+4
Socialist Party	38,783	4.42	7	–2
National Union of Independents	37,975	4.32	7	+2
Social Christian Conservative Party	33,654	3.83	2	–
Labour Party	17,785	2.03	4	New
Republican Movement	10,393	1.18	1	New
Christian National Party	9,085	1.03	0	–4
Laborista Party	8,010	0.91	0	–1
Radical Doctrinaire Party	5,577	0.64	0	–3
Doctrinaire Democratic Party	3,302	0.38	0	New
People's National Movement	1,342	0.15	0	–1
Independents	17,304	1.97	2	New
Total	878,229	100.00	147	0
Registered voters/turnout	1,284,159	–		
Source: Nohlen
