= Alberto Espina =

Chilean lawyer and politician

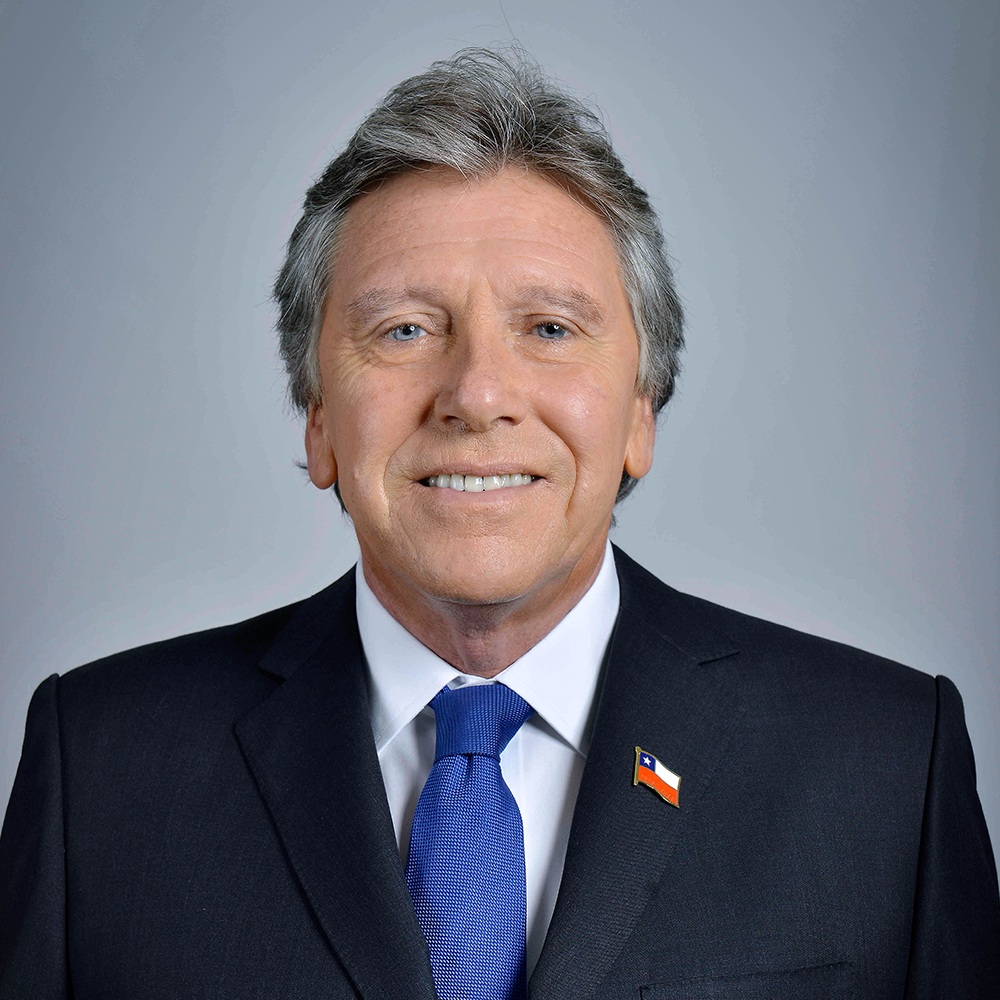
- Official portrait (2018)

Minister of Defense
- In office 11 March 2018 – 28 July 2020
- President: Sebastián Piñera
- Preceded by: José Antonio Gómez
- Succeeded by: Mario Desbordes

Member of the Senate of Chile
- In office 11 March 2002 – 11 March 2018
- Preceded by: Francisco Prat Alemparte
- Succeeded by: Dissolution of the Circumscription
- Constituency: 14th Circunscription

Member of the Chamber of Deputies
- In office 11 March 1990 – 11 March 2002
- Preceded by: Creation of the district
- Succeeded by: Marcela Cubillos
- Constituency: 21st District

Personal details
- Born: 4 December 1956 (age 69) Santiago, Chile
- Party: Movimiento de Unión Nacional (1983–1987); Renovación Nacional (1988–)
- Spouse: María Elena Donoso (1980–)
- Children: Three
- Parent(s): Alberto Espina Barros; María Eliana Otero Donoso
- Relatives: Miguel Otero Lathrop (uncle)
- Education: Universidad de Chile (LL.B)
- Occupation: Politician
- Profession: Lawyer

Alberto Miguel Espina Otero (born 4 December 1956) is a Chilean lawyer and politician who served as a parliamentarian and as a Minister of Defense in the second government of the President Sebastián Piñera (2018–2022).

A member of the National Renewal (RN) party. He served as a Senator for the 14th Senatorial District (North), representing the Araucanía Region, for two consecutive terms between 2002 and 2018.

Espina was a Member of the Chamber of Deputies for District No. 21 in the Metropolitan Region of Santiago, serving three consecutive terms between 1990 and 2002. He also served as president of RN between 25 June 1997 and 22 June 1999.

== Early life and education ==
Espina was born in Santiago on 4 November 1956. He is the son of Alberto Espina Barros and María Eliana Otero Lathrop, and the nephew of former senator Miguel Otero Lathrop, who served between 1991 and 1998 following the death of senator Jaime Guzmán. He is married to María Elena Donoso Peña, a physical education teacher, and has three children: María José, Nicolás, and Francisca.

He completed his primary and secondary education at The Grange School, graduating in 1974. He later studied law at the University of Chile, obtaining his law degree on 30 August 1982.

== Professional career ==
Espina served as a teaching assistant in the departments of Constitutional Law and Procedural Law, and as an adjunct professor of Procedural Law at the Faculty of Law of the University of Chile. He was also a professor at the Carabineros School for 17 years (1985–2002), teaching Criminal Law and General Legal Institutions.

In 1982, he joined the law firm Otero as an associate lawyer, remaining there until 1990. In 1993, he became a partner at the law firm Espina, Hinzpeter, Zepeda y Compañía, from which he withdrew in 2013.

He served as Executive Director of the Office for the Oversight of Crime and Drug Trafficking Complaints (FICED), an initiative created through a municipal agreement in 2000 and later complemented by a private non-profit corporation. The organization provided legal assistance to victims of serious crimes, including drug trafficking, robbery, and sexual abuse, coordinating with law enforcement agencies and the courts. Under his leadership, FICED processed thousands of criminal complaints nationwide and conducted extensive research on public security, drug trafficking, and violent crime in Chile.

== Political career ==
Espina began his political activities as a student leader and president of his high school student council, opposing the government of the Popular Unity coalition. In 1983, he was a founding member of the National Union Movement, serving on its Political Commission and later as president of its youth wing. The movement later subscribed to the National Accord for the Transition to Democracy in August 1985.

He was among the founders of National Renewal and, in 1987, joined the party’s first Political Commission, a position he held until 1990. That same year, he became vice president of the party. In 1988, he was elected president of the Barnechea–Vitacura district and later assumed the presidency of the party in the Metropolitan Region.

Between 25 June 1997 and 22 June 1999, Espina served as president of National Renewal. During that period, he also joined the central campaign team of presidential candidate Joaquín Lavín. In 2005, he served as political coordinator of the presidential campaign of Sebastián Piñera.

On 11 March 2018, Espina was appointed Minister of National Defense by President Piñera. He served in that role until 28 July 2020.

In November 2020, he was appointed Legal Counsel to the Council of State Defense (CDE) by Piñera, becoming a member of its Labor and Environmental Committee.
