= Francisco Prat (politician) =

Chilean politician (1948–2024)

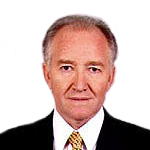
- Prat in 1990

Member of the Senate
- In office 11 March 1990 – 11 March 2002
- Preceded by: Constituency established
- Succeeded by: Alberto Espina
- Constituency: 14th Circumscription

Governor of Malleco Province
- In office 1989 – 11 March 1990
- Succeeded by: Roberto Parant

Personal details
- Born: 26 April 1948 Santiago, Chile
- Died: 27 March 2024 (aged 75) Santiago, Chile
- Party: RN (1987–2001); UDI (2001–2024)
- Education: University of Chile
- Occupation: Businessman

Francisco Javier Prat Alemparte (26 April 1948 – 27 March 2024) was a Chilean businessman and politician. A member of the National Renewal and later the Independent Democratic Union, he served as governor of Malleco Province from 1989 to 1990 and was a member of the Senate from 1990 to 2002.

Prat died in Santiago on 27 March 2024, at the age of 75. He was the son of far-right politician Jorge Prat and grandson of military officer and national hero Arturo Prat.

He served as Senator for the 14th Senatorial Constituency (Araucanía North), between 1990 and 2002, initially representing Renovación Nacional and later UDI.

== Biography ==
=== Family and youth ===
He was born in Santiago, Chile, on 26 April 1948. He was the son of lawyer and politician Jorge Prat Echaurren, one of the founders of the National Party, and María de la Luz Alemparte Pohlhammer. He was the great-grandson of Chilean naval hero Arturo Prat Chacón.

He was married to Patricia Errázuriz Lagos and was the father of nine children.

=== Professional career ===
He completed his secondary education at the Notre Dame School. After finishing school, he entered the Faculty of Physical and Mathematical Sciences of the University of Chile, where he studied Industrial Civil Engineering, graduating in 1971.

In his professional life, he devoted himself mainly to agricultural activities, particularly fruit production and plant nurseries in the city of Angol.

== Political career ==
In 1987, he began his political career as a founding member of Renovación Nacional in the province of Malleco, establishing the party's regional branch.

Two years later, in 1989, he was appointed by the Military Government as Provincial Governor of Malleco.

In the parliamentary elections of 14 December 1989, he ran for the Senate representing Renovación Nacional in the Democracy and Progress electoral pact (List B), for the 14th Senatorial Constituency, corresponding to Araucanía North, for the 1990–1994 term. He was elected with 29,619 votes, equivalent to 21.63% of the validly cast votes.

In 1993, he sought re-election as Senator for the same constituency, representing Renovación Nacional within the Alliance for Chile pact. He was re-elected with the second-highest vote for the 1994–2002 term, obtaining 38,662 votes, corresponding to 27.94% of the valid votes.

In June 1998, he resigned from Renovación Nacional. On 30 November 2000, he joined the UDI, becoming part of the party's Senate caucus.

In 2001, he decided not to seek re-election.

He died in Santiago on 27 March 2024.

== Honours ==
In August 2001, the Independent Democratic Union awarded him the Jaime Guzmán Medal in recognition of his efforts toward unity within the political sector.

In 2010, the Municipality of Angol named him an Illustrious Citizen of the city.

In August 2017, the Angol Chamber of Commerce, Industry and Tourism recognized his business activity in the municipality.
