= National Labour Front (Chile) =

Defunct right-wing political party in Chile

National Labour Front Frente Nacional del Trabajo
- Leader: Sergio Onofre Jarpa
- Founded: 13 December 1985
- Dissolved: 29 April 1987
- Merged into: National Renewal
- Headquarters: Santiago de Chile
- Ideology: Conservatism; Nationalism
- Political position: Right-wing

The National Labour Front (Spanish: Frente Nacional del Trabajo, FNT) was a rightist political party of Chile existent from 1985 to 1987, and led by Sergio Onofre Jarpa.

== History ==
The political movement was publicly presented by the former Interior Minister Sergio Onofre Jarpa on 13 December 1985 at the Feria de Peñuelas (Coquimbo), at which he announced the creation of a "National Workers Front" (Frente Nacional de Trabajadores). Jarpa was a former member of the National Action party and later founder of the National Party, the former Christian Democrats Juan De Dios Carmona and William Thayer Arteaga and the former members of Radical Democracy party, Ángel Faivovich, Germán Picó Cañas and Aquiles Cornejo.

The launch of the new Constitution of 1980 began the constitutional phase of the military dictatorship, in which the political world was rearranged and reorganized in terms of supporting the regime or demanding Pinochet’s immediate ouster, either by way peacefully or by force of arms. In these circumstances, both the Chilean political left and the political right were atomized into various parties and movements, with the National Labour Front as one of them. Its stance was critical of the economic policy of the military regime.

On 7 November 1986, the political committee of the Social Democracy Party decided to merge into the FNT. In August of the same year the Social Christian Movement also decided to join the FNT.

On 9 January 1987, the National Union Movement (MUN) of Andrés Allamand made an appeal to the Independent Democratic Union (UDI) of Jaime Guzmán and the National Labour Front (FNT), led by former Interior Minister Sergio Onofre Jarpa, to form a single right-wing party. Following this, on 8 February proceedings were initiated to form National Renewal (RN), made its definitive legalization concluded on 29 April 1987.
