= Francisco Prat =

Francisco Prat may refer to:

- Francisco Prat (skier)
- Francisco Prat (politician)
