= Capital punishment in Peru =

Capital punishment in Peru was last used in 1979. In the same year, the death penalty was abolished for ordinary crimes. Peru is one of seven countries that has abolished capital punishment for "ordinary crimes only." Peru voted in favor of the United Nations moratorium on the death penalty in 2007, 2008, 2010, 2012, 2014, 2016, 2018, and 2020. Peru is not a signatory to the Second Optional Protocol to the International Covenant on Civil and Political Rights.

== History ==
Peru's final execution took place on January 20, 1979, when Julio Vargas Garayar, a 26-year-old Air Force sergeant, was shot by a firing squad for selling classified political information to Chile, who were then considered political enemies of Peru. Vargas was arrested on October 12, 1978, while trying to enter an air base in Talara; he was accused of attempting to enter the base to collect classified information from it. After a brief trial before a military tribunal, Vargas was convicted of the charges. He was formally ordered to pay 100,000 pesos and simultaneously sentenced to death on December 14, 1978; his appeal to the Supreme Council of Military Justice was rejected the day before his execution, and he was summarily stripped of his honors, dishonorably discharged, and executed at 6:00 AM. Some consider the execution to be controversial to this date; Vargas's daughter and other members of his surviving family claim that Peruvian officials forced a confession from Vargas by using torture.

Later in 1979, Peru abolished the death penalty for crimes committed during peacetime, specifying via an amendment in their Constitution that such executions were therefore abolished. However, the Constitution did not abolish executions for six specific wartime crimes: treason, genocide, crimes against humanity, terrorism, war crimes, and murder.

== Current usage ==
Capital punishment is currently legal only during times of international or civil war, with several restrictions. Death sentences and executions during this time are allowed for specific crimes and may only be imposed by military courts during states of war. Executions are carried out by a firing squad, and the death penalty is still permitted for the same six specific crimes exempted from the Constitution's peacetime abolition.

In spite of the abolition of peacetime capital punishment and the fact that the government has not carried out an official execution since 1979, there have still been some documented extrajudicial and unofficial executions, such as the Barrios Altos massacre in 1991 and the April 22, 1997, executions of paramilitary hostage-takers in Peru's Japanese embassy.

== Modern developments ==
The Constitution of Peru allows for the reinstatement of the death penalty for peacetime terrorism. On August 8, 2006, President Alan García announced that he planned to submit a bill to the Peruvian Congress proposing that the death penalty be restored during peacetime. The announcement attracted condemnation from human rights groups like the International Federation for Human Rights. The IFHR issued a statement later that month stating that reintroducing the death penalty in Peru would be "a setback for human rights." President García submitted the bill later in 2006. On January 10, 2007, the Peruvian Congress rejected the bill in a 48-27 vote.

Earlier, in August 2006, President García proposed reintroducing the death penalty in Peru for rape and child murder, which attracted condemnation from human rights groups like the International Federation for Human Rights. The IFHR issued a statement later that month stating that reintroducing the death penalty in Peru would be "a setback for human rights."

The February 1, 2018, rape and murder of 11-year-old Jimena Vellaneda in Lima reignited the debate concerning the death penalty in Peru. A week after her murder, more than 4,000 Peruvian citizens participated in a march through Lima protesting her murder and calling for her murderer to receive harsh punishment.
