= Nazism in Mexico =

Nazism in Mexico (Spanish: Nazismo) began in the 1930s, before World War II, when the Nazi Party conducted political propaganda in the country to attract militants, whether German immigrants or Mexican nationalists who sympathized with Nazi ideals.

== History ==
When Adolf Hitler became chancellor of Germany in 1933, thousands of Jews began to fear persecution due to the antisemitic rhetoric of the Third Reich and the popularity of Hitler's famous book, Mein Kampf. Thus, German Jews emigrated to Mexico via ships bound to Port of Veracruz. The port authority began accepting Jewish refugees as early as 1937, albeit unofficially, due to the controversial nature of the Jewish question and the rising antisemitism in the politics of Caribbean countries.

However, it was during this period in the 1930s that Nazism began to gain followers in the country. The most notable example was the Revolutionary Mexicanist Action (ARM), colloquially known as the "Gold Shirts," which played an important role in Nazi propaganda and sought the deportation of the Jewish people and called for a boycott of their businesses. Although it was known that the organization had the support of the Mexican bourgeoisie, little was known that the Nazi Party itself also financed them.

In 1936, one night the Gold Shirts raided Jewish businesses, destroying them and attacking their owners. The protests in response were immediate, highlighting those of the US embassy, the Mexican Communist Party and the International Red Aid. The general public described the event as a pogrom.

The year 1942 would mark a turning point in Mexican history. On May 13, the government issued a declaration of war against Germany, Italy, and Japan through the Congress of the Union after two oil tankers were sunk by Nazi submarines. From then on, Mexican sympathy for the Axis countries gradually waned; the country sent 300 soldiers from 201st Fighter Squadron to the Philippines to liberate the country from Japanese occupation, and many more volunteered for Allied troops to fight the Germans and Italians in Europe.

== Neonazism ==
The 21st century saw the rise of neo-Nazism in Mexico, particularly on internet forums and blogs, where they repeat the anti-Semitic claims of Anglo-American or European neo-Nazis. Mexican neo-Nazis are divided into lighter complected Mexicans and darker complected, who are derogatorily referred to as "morenazis."

In the 2010s and 2020s, there have been cases of pro-Nazi rock bands holding clandestine concerts in major Mexican cities, many of which openly displayed associated symbols such as the swastika or Hitler's cult of personality. According to Metal-Archives, at least 28 neo-Nazi black metal bands have been identified in the country, 21 of which are active.
