= Juan de Dios Carmona =

Chilean politician

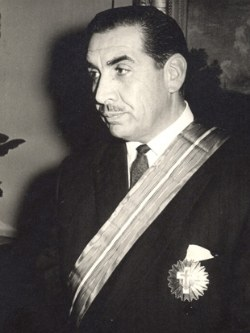

Ambassador of Chile to Spain
- In office 1980–1983
- Appointed by: Augusto Pinochet
- Preceded by: René Rojas Galdames
- Succeeded by: Mariano Fontecilla de Santiago-Concha

Member of the Senate
- In office 15 May 1969 – 11 September 1973
- Succeeded by: Dissolution of the Office
- Constituency: 1st Provincial Agrupation (Tarapacá and Antofgasta)

Minister of Economy, Development and Tourism
- In office 2 May 1968 – 30 September 1968
- President: Eduardo Frei Montalva
- Preceded by: Andrés Zaldívar
- Succeeded by: Enrique Krauss

Ministry of National Defense
- In office 3 November 1968 – 2 May 1968
- President: Eduardo Frei Montalva
- Preceded by: Carlos Vial
- Succeeded by: Tulio Marambio

Head of the Chamber of Deputies
- In office 29 January 1957 – 15 May 1957
- Preceded by: Julio Durán Neumann
- Succeeded by: Héctor Correa

Member of the Chamber of Deputies
- In office 15 May 1949 – 11 May 1961
- Constituency: Antofagasta Region

Mayor of Antofagasta
- In office 1948–1949
- Preceded by: Miguel Rojas Acuña
- Succeeded by: Alberto Salas

Personal details
- Born: 22 December 1916 Antofagasta, Chile
- Died: 29 October 2009 (aged 92) Santiago, Chile
- Party: National Falange (1941–1957); Christian Democratic Party (1957–1976); Social Christian Movement (1983–1987); National Labour Front (1987); National Renewal (1987–2009)
- Spouse: Lidia González
- Children: Four
- Education: University of Chile (LL.B)
- Occupation: Politician
- Profession: Lawyer

Juan de Dios Carmona Peralta (9 December 1916 – 27 October 2009) is a Chilean politician who was a member of the Senate of Chile, and also served as minister and was part of the Ortúzar Commission.
