= Democratic Socialist Party (Chile) =

- President: Florencio Galleguillos
- Founded: October 11, 1959
- Dissolved: September 18, 1960
- Succeeded by: National Democratic Party
- Ideology: Democratic Socialism; Anti-Class war Reformism
- Political position: Left to center-left

The Democratic Socialist Party (Spanish: Partido Socialista Democrático, PSD) was a Chilean political party that existed from 1959 to 1960. It originated as a dissident faction of the Socialist Party of Chile.

== History ==
The collective was founded on October 11, 1959, by Florencio Galleguillos, Socialist representative of the Seventh departamental grouping, second district of Santiago. It defined itself as a moderate left-wing party and rejected the concept of class conflict common in other political parties. Its founders were Galleguillos (president), Enrique Arriagada Saldías (vicepresident) and Belmor Montenegro Godoy (secretary general).

It participated in the 1960 municipal elections, where it gained no representatives. After its electoral defeat, the party combined with other movements to found the National Democratic Party.
