= Julio Vargas Garayar =

Peruvian soldier executed for treason

- Vargas Garayar in the Air Force
- Born: Julio Alfonso Vargas Garayar; 1949; Lima, Peru
- Died: 20 January 1979 (aged 29–30); Lima, Peru
- Status: Executed by firing squad
- Convictions: High treason; Espionage
- Penalty: Death (14 December 1978)
- Military career
- Allegiance: Peru; Chile (alleged by Peru)
- Branch: Peruvian Air Force
- Service years: 1970s–1978
- Rank: Non-commissioned officer

Julio Alfonso Vargas Garayar (1949 – 20 January 1979) was a Peruvian soldier who was the last person to be executed in Peru. Vargas Garayar, a 29-year-old non-commissioned officer of the Peruvian Air Force, was convicted of spying on local military air fields and giving the information to Chilean intelligence. His execution in January 1979 took place amid increasing historical tensions between Peru and Chile.

Since Vargas Garayar's execution, Peru has not applied the death sentence again, becoming an abolitionist country for common crimes, allowing its usage in wartime and for acts of terrorism.

== Background ==
=== Vargas Garayar ===
Little is known about Vargas Garayar's early life. He was born in 1949 in Lima into a severely poor family, being evicted along with his mother when he was 15 days old while suffering from whooping cough and bronchopneumonia. In his adolescence, Vargas Garayar began to work washing cars in front of a movie theater in Lima, dreaming of pursuing a military career. In the 1970s, he enrolled in the Ricardo Palma military school and completed a technical specialization in the Air Force (FAP). He subsequently applied to join the Chorrillos Military School, but he was rejected due to his short stature. As a result, Vargas Garayar was assigned to a military installation in Pisco, where he served long night shifts as a guard. He is said to have been subjected to physical punishments during his time in Pisco, with superiors abusing military discipline against him. He failed an exam for a promotion on two occasions, which made him take the decision of quitting the FAP in 1978 and return to Lima. Back in the capital, Vargas Garayar was employed by the Chilean Embassy to do cleaning and maintenance works in the building.

=== Political ===
Tensions between Peru and Chile date back to the War of the Pacific in the 19th-century, with ensuing border disputes since then. The animosity between both countries worsened in the 1970s, especially after Francisco Morales Bermúdez launched a coup d'état in 1975 and overthrew the government of Juan Velasco Alvarado (who had also reached power via coup).

In October 1978, a Chilean Navy ship docked in Talara, claiming it was short of fuel. Peruvian authorities followed the crew closely, catching the ship's captain and a lieutenant photographing a local air base in Arequipa. The military arrested the Chilean officers, who testified that they had been asked to take those pictures by the Chilean ambassador in Peru, Francisco Bulnes Sanfuentes. When the ship left for Guayaquil, Ecuador, an enraged Morales Bermúdez declared Bulnes persona non grata and ordered him to leave Peru. Bulnes did not contest the decision, but he asked Morales Bermúdez to allow the officers to leave Peru with him. The Peruvian leader conceded the request, and the three men were sent back to Chile following Vargas Garayar's execution in January 1979.

== Arrest and legal proceedings ==
After the arrest of the Chilean officers, Peruvian authorities launched an investigation into possible accomplices within the military. They eventually arrested NCO Julio Vargas Garayar on 12 October 1978, whom prosecutors accused of attempting to flee from Talara to Ecuador and then to Bolivia, where he would request asylum to the Chilean consulate. Under the 1933 Penal Code provisions, the military charged Vargas Garayar with high treason and espionage, putting him on trial in November 1978. The military based the accusation on money and a Kodak camera which they said was given to Vargas Garayar by Chilean intelligence.

Vargas Garayar was found guilty on both counts on 14 December 1978 and sentenced to death. He denied any responsibility and appealed the verdict to different courts, also asking the Council of Ministers to grant him a pardon. On 19 January 1979, the Supreme Council of Military Justice rejected the appeal and upheld Vargas Garayar's death sentence. That same day, his petition to be spared from execution was also denied by the government.

== Execution and aftermath ==
César Lozano, Vargas Garayar's attorney, lobbied for the commutation of his death sentence. On 19 January 1979, Lozano went to the military headquarters in Lima to file an emergency appeal, but he was denied entry and threatened with arrest. As the press arrived, Lozano and Vargas Garayar's parents drove to the Apostolic Nunciature to Peru and asked the nuncio for the intervention of Pope John Paul II to stop the execution. The nuncio promised them an answer from the Pope by 5 p.m. the next day. However, the government was firm in the position that Vargas Garayar had represented a serious security risk to the country and subsequently signed his death warrant. Vargas Garayar was executed by firing squad at 6 a.m. (PET) on 20 January 1979, maintaining that he was an innocent man.

His daughter, María Consuelo Vargas Chávez, was interviewed on ATV in April 2023, where she put into question her father's guilt and claimed that he had been psychologically and physically tortured before and after the trial. Despite his attorney's request for medical records to be released, Vargas Garayar was buried shortly after the execution, with his family not being allowed to claim his body. In a 2022 interview, his attorney recalled that the morning of the execution, he learned of Vargas Garayar's death by the radio and cried, taking the execution as a personal frustration.

In 1993, the Peruvian government modified Article 140 of the Constitution and kept the death penalty as an option only for cases of high treason during wartime and for acts of terrorism.

== See also ==
- List of most recent executions by jurisdiction
