= 1965 Chilean parliamentary election =

- 7 March 1965
- Chamber of Deputies
- All 147 seats in the Chamber of Deputies
Party	Vote %	Seats	+/–
PDC	43.60	82	+59
Radical	13.71	20	−19
Communist	12.74	18	+2
Socialist	10.58	15	+3
Liberal	7.53	6	−22
United Conservative	5.34	3	−14
PADENA	3.27	3	−9
This lists parties that won seats. See the complete results below.
- Senate
- 21 of the 45 seats in the Senate
Party	Seats	+/–
PDC	12	+9
Radical	3	−4
Socialist	3	0
Communist	2	+2
PADENA	1	+1
This lists parties that won seats. See the complete results below.

Parliamentary elections were held in Chile on 7 March 1965. The Christian Democratic Party, led by Eduardo Frei Montalva, won a majority of seats in the Chamber of Deputies, the first time a party had held a majority for several decades. The party also became the largest party in the Senate.

== Electoral system ==
The term length for Senators was eight years, with around half of the Senators elected every four years. This election saw 21 of the 45 Senate seats up for election.

== Results ==
=== Senate ===
Party	Seats		
Party	Won	Total	+/–
Christian Democratic Party	12	13	+9
Radical Party	3	9	–4
Socialist Party	3	7	0
Communist Party	2	5	+2
National Democratic Party	1	1	+1
Liberal Party	0	5	–4
United Conservative Party	0	2	–3
National Vanguard of the People	0	1	0
Independents	0	2	–1
Total	21	45	0
Source: Whelan

=== Chamber of Deputies ===
Party	Votes	%	Seats	+/–
Christian Democratic Party	995,187	43.60	82	+59
Radical Party	312,912	13.71	20	–19
Communist Party	290,635	12.73	18	+2
Socialist Party	241,593	10.58	15	+3
Liberal Party	171,979	7.53	6	–22
United Conservative Party	121,882	5.34	3	–14
National Democratic Party	74,585	3.27	3	–9
Labour Agrarian Democracy	22,552	0.99	0	New
Democratic Party	21,518	0.94	0	0
National Action	15,173	0.66	0	New
National Vanguard of the People	5,637	0.25	0	New
Popular Command	3,121	0.14	0	0
Independents	5,669	0.25	0	0
Total	2,282,443	100.00	147	0
Valid votes	2,282,443	97.00		
Invalid/blank votes	70,680	3.00		
Total votes	2,353,123	100.00		
Registered voters/turnout	2,920,615	80.57		
Source: Nohlen

== See also ==
- XLV Legislative Period of the National Congress of Chile
