= National Union Movement (Chile) =

National Union Movement Movimiento de Unión Nacional
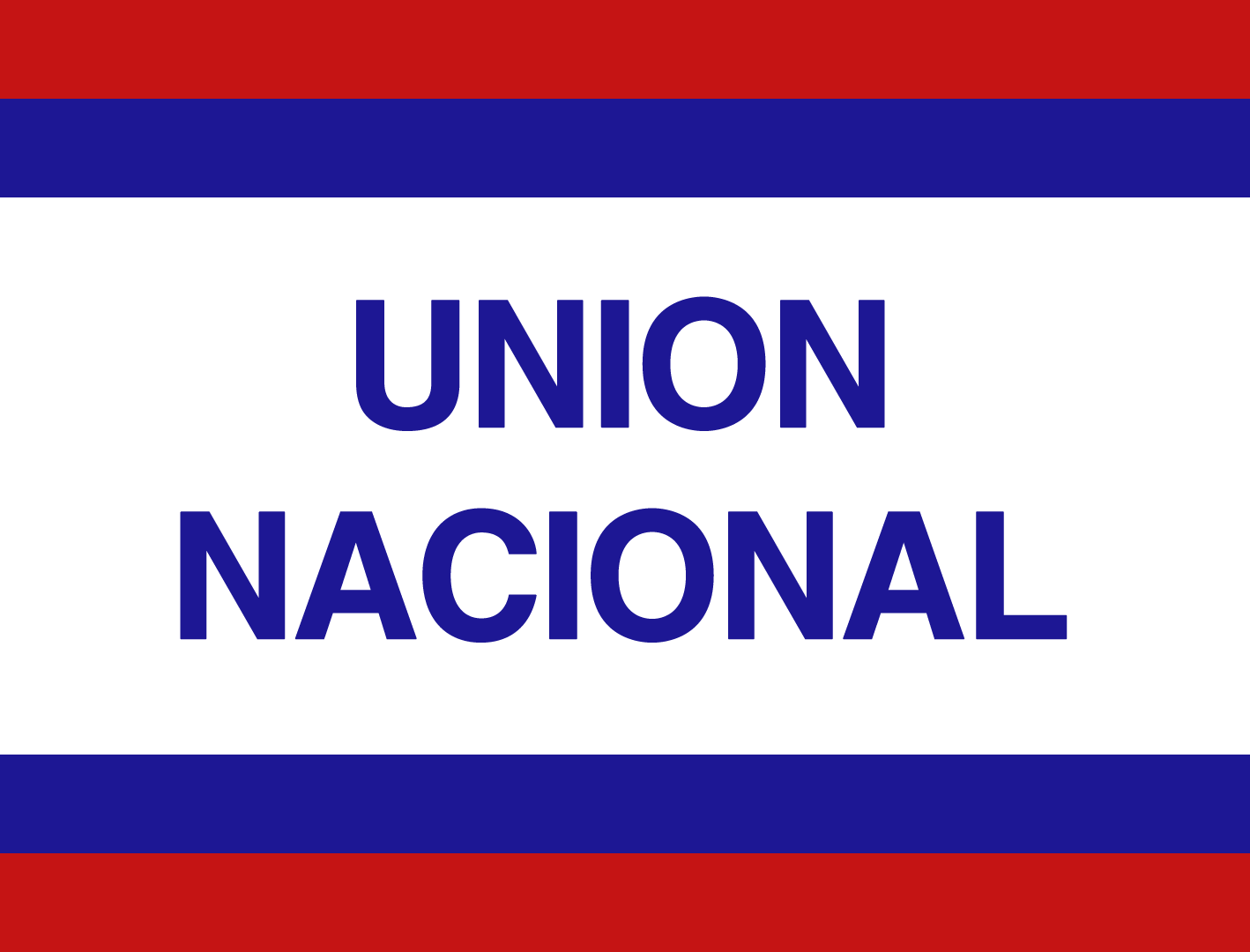
- Founded: 27 November 1983
- Dissolved: 29 April 1987
- Split from: National Party
- Merged into: National Renewal
- Headquarters: Santiago, Chile
- Newspaper: Renovación
- Ideology: Conservatism; Classical liberalism Neoliberalism
- Political position: Centre-right to right-wing
- National affiliation: National Democratic Agreement (1984–85)

The National Union Movement (Spanish: Movimiento de Unión Nacional, MUN) was a Chilean political party that supported the military dictatorship of General Augusto Pinochet, founded on 27 November 1983 by Andrés Allamand, Francisco Bulnes Sanfuentes, Pedro Ibáñez Ojeda and other former members and supporters of the National Party, the Radical Democracy and Christian Democrats expelled from the party. Many members of the National Union Movement occupied public offices and important positions during that regime. The referent defined itself as independent, conservative and liberal.

One of the leaders of the National Union Movement, Andrés Allamand, was elected secretary general of the party in 1983, holding the post until the following year, when he was elected party chairman, a post that he held until 1986. In August 1985, the MUN was one of the signatories of the National Agreement for the Transition to Full Democracy.

It joined with other movements that supported the military dictatorship a coalition known as the Group of Eight (Grupo de los Ocho), which later evolved to the National Democratic Agreement.

On 9 January 1987, the MUN made an appeal to the Independent Democratic Union (UDI) of Jaime Guzmán and the National Labour Front (FNT), led by former Interior Minister Sergio Onofre Jarpa, to form a single right-wing party. Following this, on 8 February proceedings were initiated to form National Renewal (RN), made its definitive legalization concluded on 29 April 1987.
