= Agrarian Labor Party (Chile) =

Agrarian Labor Party Partido Agrario Laborista
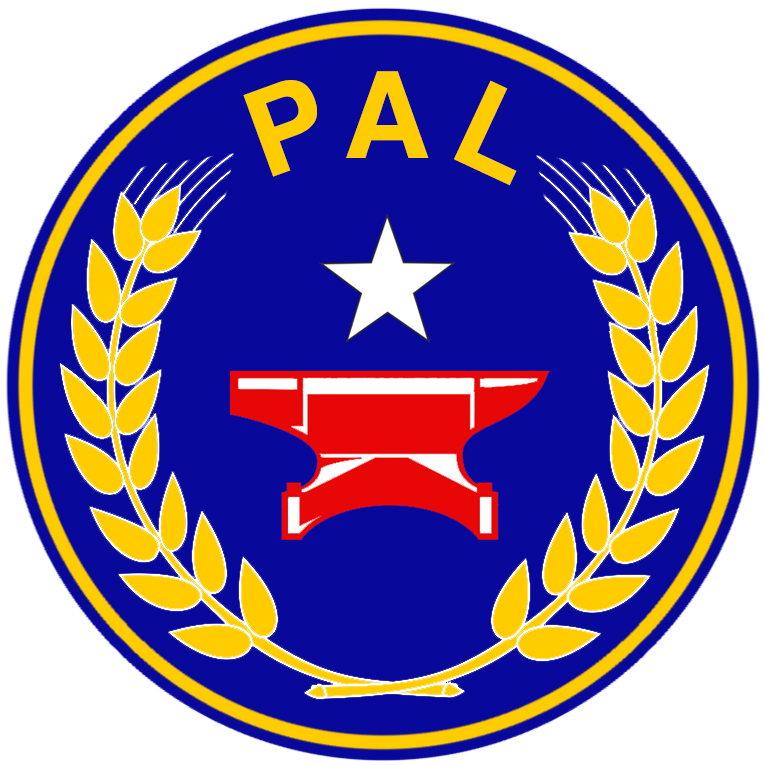
- President: Fernando Alessandri; Rafael Tarud
- Founded: September 7, 1945
- Dissolved: October 1958
- Merger of: Agrarian Party, Popular Freedom Alliance
- Succeeded by: National Popular Party
- Headquarters: Santiago, Chile
- Ideology: Agrarianism; Nationalism; Social corporatism Third Position
- Political position: Right-wing to far-right
- Colors: Blue, Gold, Red

Party flag
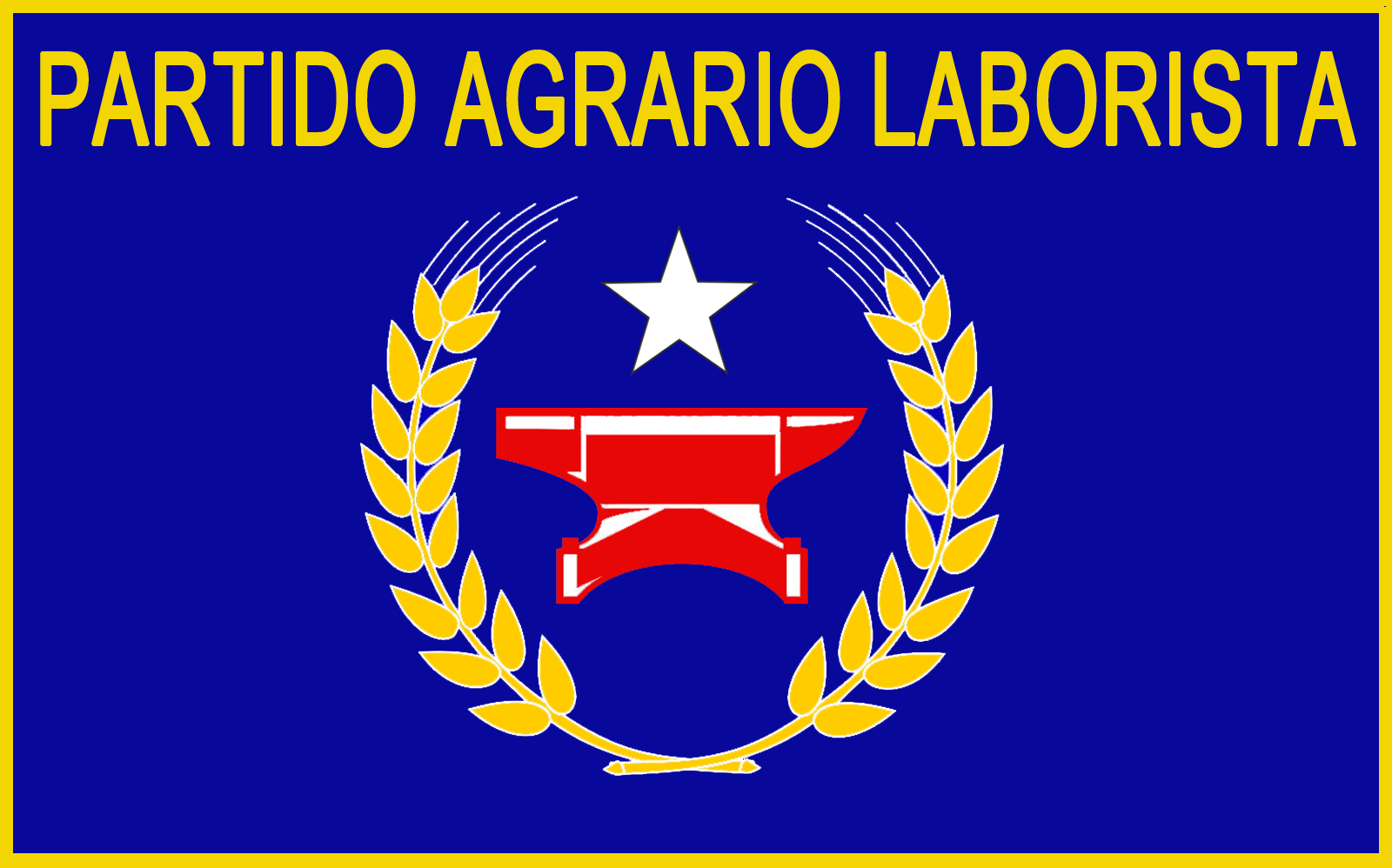

The Agrarian Labor Party (Spanish: Partido Agrario Laborista, PAL) was a Chilean political party supporting the candidacy of Carlos Ibáñez del Campo for the 1952 presidential election. Formed in 1945, it was dissolved in 1958.

It was formed in 1945 from the merger of the Agrarian Party, the Popular Freedom Alliance (an offshoot of the National Socialist Movement of Chile), the Movimiento Nacionalista de Chile and the Unión Nacionalista. Its foundational program, emphasising law and order, asserted the need to "secure public order in the country, on the functional basis that labour has not only obligations but also indisputable civil rights."

In 1951 the PAL proclaimed as its presidential candidate the former dictator Carlos Ibáñez del Campo, who had, since his first term, somehow changed political orientation. After his election in 1952, it took part in his first cabinet, along with the Popular Socialist Party formed of dissidents of the Socialist Party. Starting in 1954, the PAL's influence on Ibáñez's cabinet declined, leading to an internal crisis and to the subsequent use of the PAL label by two different organizations.

Legally, the ownership of the PAL label was among the faction opposing Ibáñez, led by the senator Julio von Mühlenbrock. New divisions split the PAL for the 1958 presidential election, with the official faction supporting the candidate of the Christian Democrat Party, Eduardo Frei Montalva, while activists from Cautín and Biobío and dissidents who formed the Partido Agrario Laborista Recuperacionista (Recover Agrarian Labor Party) supported the right-wing candidate Jorge Alessandri, along with the United Conservative Party and the Liberal Party. The PAL subsequently dissolved itself in October 1958, merging with the National Party to create the PANAPO (Partido Nacional Popular, National People's Party).

The PANAPO itself was dissolved in 1961, a faction joining the Christian Democrats, while another merged with the PADENA (Partido Democrático Nacional, National Democratic Party) which joined the left-wing FRAP coalition. Finally, a third tendency attempted to maintain the original party, without any success.

A group tried to revive the PAL for the 1965 parliamentary election under the label of Partido Democracia Agrario Laborista, but did not manage in obtaining any political representation.

== Electoral results ==
- 1949 (147 deputies in total) 14 deputies elected 38.742 votes 8,3% of the votes
- 1953 (147 deputies in total) 26 deputies elected 118.483 votes 15,2% of the votes
- 1957 (147 deputies in total) 10 deputies elected 68.602 votes 7,8% of the votes
- 1965 (147 deputies in total) 0 deputies elected 23.634 votes 1.0% of the votes

== Presidential candidates ==
The following is a list of the presidential candidates supported by the Agrarian Labor Party. (Information gathered from the Archive of Chilean Elections).

- 1946: Fernando Alessandri (lost)
- 1952: Carlos Ibáñez (won)
- 1958: Eduardo Frei Montalva (lost)

== See also ==
- Chilean Agrarian Party
- Presidential Republic Era
