= 1952 Chilean presidential election =

Election for the president of Chile

- 4 September 1952
- Registered: 1,105,029
- Turnout: 86.61% (▲10.68pp)
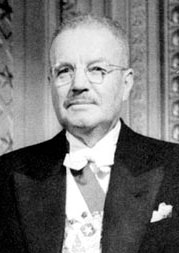

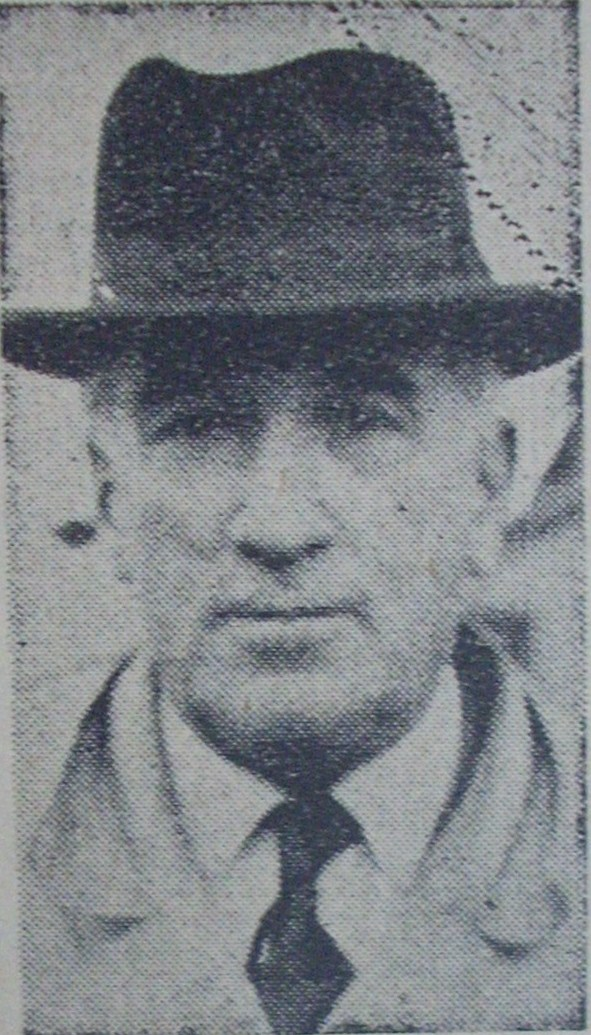

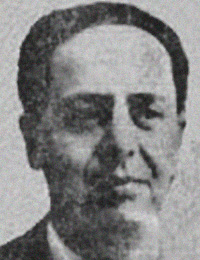

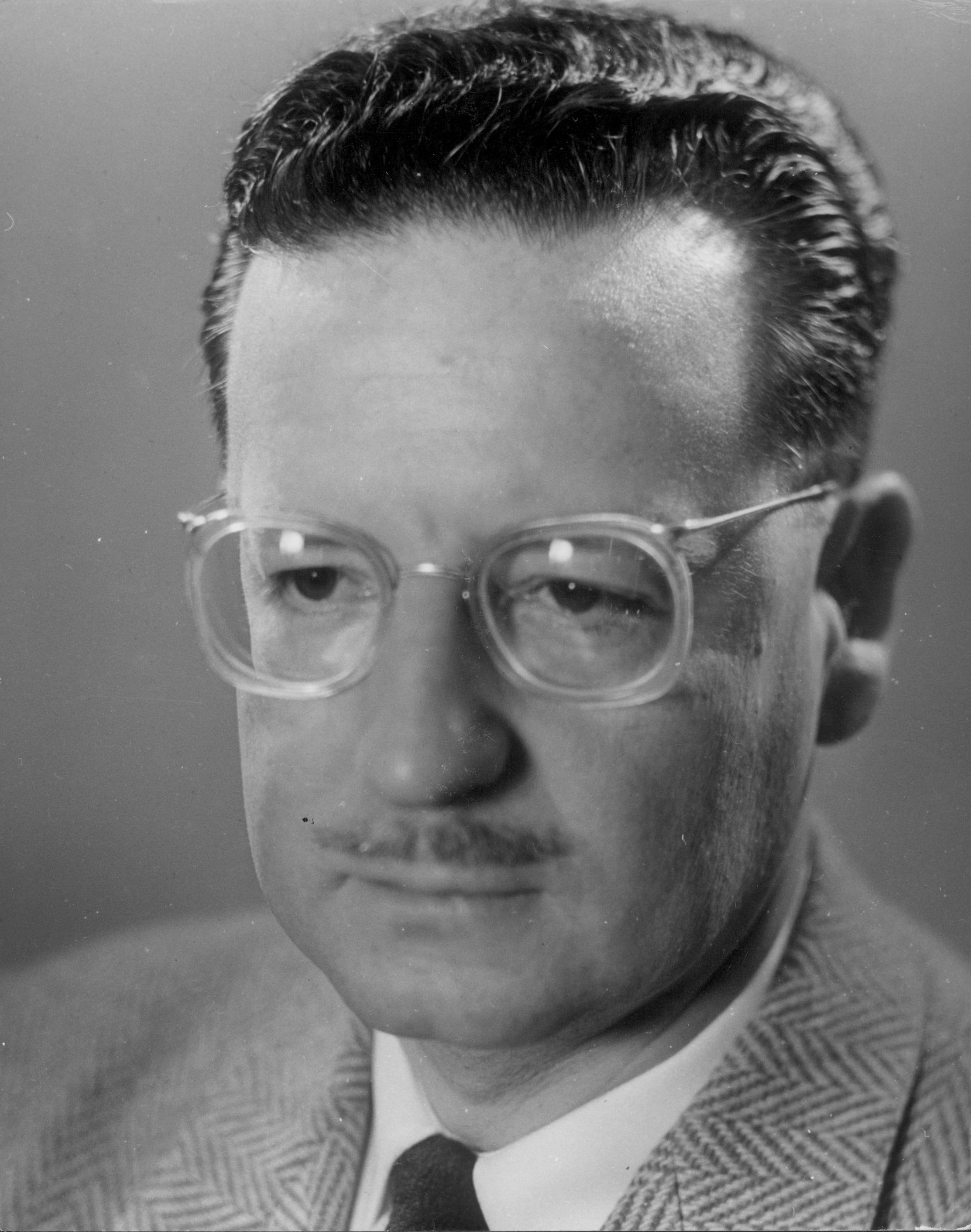
Candidate	Carlos Ibáñez del Campo	Arturo Matte Larraín
Party	Independent	Liberal
Popular vote	446,439	265,357
Percentage	46.79%	27.81%
Congress vote	132	12
Candidate	Pedro Enrique Alfonso	Salvador Allende
Party	Radical	Socialist
Popular vote	190,360	51,975
Percentage	19.95%	5.45%
- Results by commune
President before election
Gabriel González Videla
Radical
Elected President
Carlos Ibáñez del Campo
Independent

Presidential elections were held in Chile on 4 September 1952. The result was a victory for Carlos Ibáñez del Campo, who ran as an independent.

== Electoral system ==
The election was held using the absolute majority system, under which a candidate had to receive over 50% of the popular vote to be elected. If no candidate received over 50% of the vote, both houses of the National Congress would come together to vote on the two candidates who received the most votes.

== Candidates ==
=== Pedro Enrique Alfonso ===
Alfonso was the candidate of the Radical Party, and was also supported by the social democratic parties. His government would have become the fourth consecutive Radical administration, since Pedro Aguirre Cerda was elected president.

=== Salvador Allende ===
Allende, a senator, was the candidate of the Socialist Party, and was running for president for the first time. He had the support of the banned Communist Party. Allende would run three more times, winning in 1970.

=== Carlos Ibáñez del Campo ===
Former president Ibáñez was an independent senator for Santiago, and was attempting to reach the presidency, once again, by popular vote. He had the support of several minor parties, including the Socialist Popular Party and the Agrarian Labor Party.

=== Arturo Matte ===
Matte was a Liberal Party senator supported by the Liberal and Conservative parties. He was finance minister under the administration of Juan Antonio Ríos.

== Results ==
Since none of the candidates received an absolute majority of the popular votes cast on 4 September, in keeping with the 1925 Constitution a plenary session of both houses of Congress was convened to choose between the two leading candidates on 24 October. The members of Congress selected Ibáñez (who had received a greater share of the popular vote) over Matte.

Candidate	Party	Popular vote		Congress vote	
Candidate	Party	Votes	%	Votes	%
Carlos Ibáñez del Campo	Independent	446,439	46.79	132	91.67
Arturo Matte Larraín	Liberal Party	265,357	27.81	12	8.33
Pedro Enrique Alfonso Barrios	Radical Party	190,360	19.95		
Salvador Allende	Socialist Party	51,975	5.45		
Total		954,131	100.00	144	100.00
Valid votes		954,131	99.69	144	82.76
Invalid/blank votes		2,971	0.31	30	17.24
Total votes		957,102	100.00	174	100.00
Registered voters/turnout		1,105,029	86.61	192	90.62
Source: Nohlen, Chilean Electoral Database
