= Morenazi =

Political slur for a non-white Nazi

Morenazi (portmanteau from Spanish moreno—meaning "having tanned or dark skin"—and Nazi) or morenaryan are derogatory terms to describe non-white, or more directly mixed race and black neo-Nazis, who themselves show support or sympathy for Nazism, Nazi Germany, the personality cult of Adolf Hitler, and more directly white supremacism.

== Term ==
The term emerged after World War II, after the discourse of white racial purity managed to creep in with some nationalist movements critical of the republican democratic system in Latin America. Morenazis display the stereotypical ideals of the North American and European branches of neo-Nazism: racist discourses, specifically antisemitic, of the racial superiority of whites, conspiracy theories such as the persecution of whites, and the repudiation of non-white immigrants.

== Arguments in favor of Nazism among non-whites ==
People labeled as morenazis have argued that they sympathize with Nazism because of their "defense" of traditionalism, homeland, historical negationism and antisemitism. In addition to their xenophobic discourse, it has been recorded that morenazi groups, also show homophobia, transphobia and anti-communism, so that for some they are part of the extreme right.

In the early 20th century, Black separatist and Pan-Africanist leader Marcus Garvey met with leaders of the Ku Klux Klan, describing them as having more "honesty of purpose towards the Negro" than the NAACP. During a trial for mail fraud, Garvey expressed antisemitic views towards the judge and district attorney, calling them "damned dirty Jews".

On December 1, 2022, American rapper Kanye West praised Adolf Hitler on InfoWars, saying "every human being has something of value that they brought to the table, especially Hitler", "I love Jewish people but I also love Nazis", "There's a lot of things that I love about Hitler; a lot of things", "I like Hitler", and "I am a Nazi".

In September 2024 during the 2024 North Carolina gubernatorial election, CNN reported that Republican lieutenant governor of North Carolina Mark Robinson used antisemitic slurs on pornographic forums from 2008–2012. In those posts, Robinson identified as a "Black Nazi" and voiced support for Adolf Hitler.

In October 2024 during the 2024 United States Senate election in Minnesota, one of Royce White's tweets from 2022 began circulating, in which he opined that "The bad guys won World War II. There were no 'good guys' in that war. The controlling interests had a jump ball. If you look closely, you see the link between liberalism and communism in the Allied forces. Remember what Gen[eral] Patton said and why they capped him." White was referencing conspiracy theories regarding the death of George Patton. When asked about the tweet, White told Newsweek: "By 'bad guys,' I mean those who benefited from World War II without fighting in it—people who funded the wars, gained political power or institutional prominence," he said. "I'm talking about entities like the United Nations, which I'm not the first to criticize, and organizations like the [International Monetary Fund] and the World Bank. The crony capitalism that spread globally after the war—yes, they won World War II."

When confronted with social media scrutiny, some of these same morenazis have backtracked on their incongruous ideas, disbanded, and expressed that they will engage in self-reflection to correct their errors.

== Critics ==
The Mexican newspaper Enlace Judío made a report called Los morenazis: con la suástica por dentro ("The Morenazis: with the swastika on the inside"), about neo-Nazism in Mexico, where the interviewer of Jewish origin describes the morenazis as totally ignoring the issue of racism in white supremacist neo-Nazi circles:

I tried to visualize that chubby, doe-eyed, dark skinned man on Aryan Propaganda posters or marching in the imposing military parades of the Third Reich (...) I wondered if the guy was unaware of the fact that Mexican immigrants were among the favorite victims of neo-Nazis in the United States.

Civil rights organizer Eric K. Ward has written about how white nationalists have advocated temporary alliances with "the Blacks, the Mexicans, the Orientals" against the "real enemy", which they believe to be the Zionist Occupation Government.

== See also ==
- Neo-fascism
- Populism in Latin America
- Right-wing populism
- Operation Bolívar
- Non-Germans in the German armed forces during World War II
- Honorary Aryan
- Race traitor
- Self-hating Jew
- African American–Jewish relations
- Black conservatism
- Black supremacy
- Black separatism
- Views of Kanye West
- Nick Fuentes
- Groypers
- GypsyCrusader
- Nation of Islam
  - Nation of Islam and antisemitism
- Wehrmacht foreign volunteers and conscripts
- Waffen-SS foreign volunteers and conscripts
