= Jorge Prat =

Chilean politician

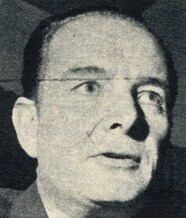
- Born: Jorge Prat Echaurren; April 24, 1918; Santiago, Chile
- Died: December 20, 1971 (aged 53); Curacaví
- Education: Pontifical Catholic University of Chile
- Occupation: Banker
- Employer: Banco del Estado
- Known for: Politician
- Title: Minister of Finance
- Term: 1954-1955
- Political party: National Socialist Movement of Chile; Conservative Party; National Action

Jorge Prat Echaurren (24 April 1918 – 20 December 1971) was a Chilean nationalist politician. Prat was a leading figure on the far right of Chilean politics for several decades, although he also served a brief spell as a cabinet minister in the 1950s.

== Early years ==
Prat was born in Santiago, Chile. He graduated from the Pontifical Catholic University of Chile in 1941 with a law degree and initially practised as a lawyer. He subsequently entered banking and was appointed president of the Caja Nacional de Ahorros in 1952. Under his leadership it changed its name to the Banco del Estado de Chile in 1953.

== Estanqueros ==
A veteran of the nationalist political scene, he was first associated with the National Socialist Movement of Chile or Nacistas, albeit as a low level member. In 1941 he also acted as president of the Conservative Youth of Chile although he split from its parent group, the Conservative Party, in 1947.

During the late 1940s he led his own group, the Estanqueros, based around corporatism and strong support for the regimes of Francisco Franco and António de Oliveira Salazar as well as militant anti-communism. It sought the creation of a highly disciplined hierarchy in society and government with a strong charismatic leader and an elite ruling class in an ideology that Prat called current portalismo after Diego Portales. Roman Catholicism and anti-Americanism were also central features of Estanquero thought. His movement published its own weekly newspaper, Estanquero, between 1946 and 1954, from which the group took its name. The group was associated with the far right Agrarian Labor Party, although Prat himself, unlike many others who were part of his group, never formally became a member of this group. Later the Estanqueros would be subsumed into the Chilean Anti-Communist Action a more militant group associated with rightist former dictator Carlos Ibáñez del Campo.

== Later political career ==
Prat would himself become associated with Ibáñez and served as Minister of Finance in his second government from 1954 to 1955. As Minister Prat endorsed an austerity programme with higher taxes and the suspension of the right to strike, leading to severe opposition from the National Congress of Chile. His governmental career ended soon after this.

Prat then attempted to run for President of Chile in the 1964 election and to this end formed his own party, the National Action, with Sergio Onofre Jarpa in 1963. Prat's campaign did not prove a success however and he withdrew his candidacy before the election. His campaign had largely been run on an anti-Congress platform, calling for a much stronger Presidency and significant increases in military spending. It has since been suggested that United States intelligence services encouraged political leaders to pressure Prat into abandoning his candidacy in case his presence in the election split the vote and allowed Salvador Allende to be elected. His party fell apart soon after, with the bulk of its membership transferring allegiance to the newly established National Party in 1966.

Prat did not become involved in the National Party, and instead concentrated his efforts on largely failed attempts to build a united far-right, anti-democracy party. The most notable of these efforts was the Unión Cívica Democrática, a group he established with Arturo Olavarria and which became noted for its violent opposition to communism.

He died in Curacaví in 1971. His funeral was attended by several far right leaders, with Sergio Onofre Jarpa and National Party leader Mario Arnello amongst the mourners.
