= National Action (Chile) =

Defunct political party in Chile

National Action Acción Nacional
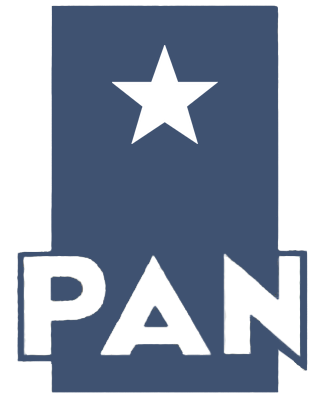
- Founded: 15 November 1963
- Dissolved: 11 May 1966
- Merged into: National Party
- Headquarters: Santiago de Chile
- Ideology: Nationalism; National conservatism Corporatism; Ibañismo
- Political position: Right-wing

The National Action Party, or simply National Action (Spanish: Acción Nacional), was a Chilean right-wing political party of nationalist ideology.

National Action was founded by Jorge Prat Echaurren, Sergio Onofre Jarpa and Tobías Barros on November 15, 1963; their board of directors consisting of Sergio Onofre Jarpa as president and Renato Marino as secretary. The party sought to raise Prat bid for the presidential election of 1964, but this was deposed in April 1964.

Some of the members of National Action were Mario Arnello Romo, Sergio Miranda Carrington, and Hugo Gálvez. The group also included former supporters of defunct President Carlos Ibáñez del Campo (Ibañistas) and former members of the National Syndicalist Revolutionary Movement (Movimiento Revolucionario Nacional Sindicalista, MRNS), that doesn't had legal existence, and therefore had difficulties to compete in elections.

The party presented a list in parliamentary elections in 1965. The list of senators in Santiago got 54,536 votes, which were not enough to choose any senator. Lists of deputies, however, gained only 15,173 votes distributed in the provinces of Tarapacá, Valparaiso, Santiago and Talca, not choosing any parliamentarian. In May 1966 it merged with the Liberal Party and the United Conservative Party to form the National Party.
