= United Conservative Party (Chile) =

United Conservative Party Partido Conservador Unido
- Founded: 15 December 1953
- Dissolved: 11 May 1966
- Merger of: Traditionalist Conservative Party and a faction of the Social Christian Conservative Party
- Merged into: National Party
- Headquarters: Santiago de Chile
- Ideology: Conservatism
- Political position: Right-wing
- Religion: Catholicism

The United Conservative Party (Spanish: Partido Conservador Unido, PCU) was a right-wing Chilean political party founded in December 1953 after the merger of the Traditionalist Conservative Party and a faction of the Social Christian Conservative Party, issued from the Conservative Party. It supported for the 1958 presidential election the candidacy of Jorge Alessandri and participated, along with the Liberal Party and supporters of former president Carlos Ibáñez del Campo, in its government. In 1962, it participated in the Democratic Front of Chile center-right coalition which opposed the left-wings FRAP coalition and supported for the 1964 presidential election Eduardo Frei Montalva (who obtained less than 56% of the votes).

Following the low results obtained at the 1965 parliamentary elections, the United Conservative Party merged in 1966 with the Liberal Party and the National Action (founded in 1963 by Jorge Prat Echaurren, who had been Minister of Finances in 1954 in Carlos Ibáñez del Campo's cabinet), thus creating the National Party.

== Electoral results ==
- 1957 parliamentary election (21 deputies on a total of 147) — 13,8% of the votes
- 1961 parliamentary election (17 deputies on a total of 147) — 14,3% of the votes
- 1965 parliamentary election (03 deputies on a total of 147) — 05,2% of the votes

== Presidential candidates ==
The following is a list of the presidential candidates supported by the United Conservative Party. (Information gathered from the Archive of Chilean Elections).

- 1958: Jorge Alessandri (won)
- 1964: Eduardo Frei Montalva (won)

== See also ==
- Category:United Conservative Party (Chile) politicians
- Conservative Party (Chile)
- Presidential Republic Era
