= Personalismo =

Political ideology

Personalismo is a cult of personality built around Latin American and African political leaders in personalist dictatorships. It often involves subjugating the interests of political parties, ideologies and constitutional government to loyalty to one leader. In personalismo, it is customary for the dictator's personal charisma to be considered as more important than political achievements.

Many political parties in the region have been made up of personal supporters of a particular leader, as is apparent from the colloquial names of their members. In Argentina, for example, the Partido Justicialista's supporters are commonly referred to only as "Peronists", according to Juan Perón, and in Cuba, Fidel Castro's supporters are "Castristas" or "Fidelistas". Although personalismo is quite common throughout Latin American history, it has been a particular part of the political systems of the Dominican Republic and Ecuador.

Personalismo is closely linked to the Latin American caudilismo phenomenon, where states are dominated by leaders (caudillos) whose power leans on violence and, on the other hand, personal charisma. Caudillos were particularly common in the newly independent Latin American states of the early 19th century. However, caudilismo remained a common phenomenon until the 20th century, either as Peronism-like populist movements or as direct military dictatorships.
