= Popular Socialist Party (Chile) =

Defunct political party in Chile

Popular Socialist Party Partido Socialista Popular
- Founded: 1948
- Dissolved: 1957
- Split from: Socialist Party of Chile
- Merged into: Socialist Party of Chile
- Headquarters: Santiago, Chile
- Ideology: Democratic socialism Populism
- Political position: Left-wing

The Popular Socialist Party (Spanish: Partido Socialista Popular, or PSP) was a Chilean left-wing political party that existed between 1948 and 1957. It was the result of the division of the Socialist Party of Chile in 1948 by voting and promulgation of Law No. 8,987 of Defense of Democracy in which the PS was divided in its vote and support among pro-communist and anti-communist.

The anti-communist faction (which were in Bernardo Ibáñez, Oscar Schnake and Juan Bautista Rossetti) supported the law, and the pro-communist (headed by Eugenio González and Raúl Ampuero) refused. The anticommunist group is expelled but makes the Conservative Electoral Registration assign them the name of the Socialist Party of Chile. So the faction led by Ampuero adopted the name Popular Socialist Party.

The party supported the presidential candidacy of Carlos Ibáñez del Campo in 1952. The argument used to support Ibáñez was that it was a popular candidate and needed to drag him from within a truly progressive orientation. When the new government in November 1952, the PSP got the Ministry of Labour with Clodomiro Almeyda. From there, he supported the founding of the Central Workers Union in February 1953. In April 1953, Ibanez reshuffled his cabinet PSP occupying the Ministry of Finance (Felipe Herrera), Labour (Enrique Monti Forno) and Mining (Almeyda). PSP participation in government ends in October 1953.

In 1956, along with other leftist parties, formed the FRAP, which allowed for a rapprochement with the PS. Which led to the 1957 Unity Conference, which reunites the two major factions of Chilean socialism in the Socialist Party of Chile.

== Presidential candidates ==
The following is a list of the presidential candidates supported by the Socialist Party. (Information gathered from the Archive of Chilean Elections).

- 1952: Carlos Ibáñez del Campo (won)

== See also ==
- Socialist Party of Chile

== Bibliography ==
- Cruz-Coke, Ricardo. 1984. Historia electoral de Chile. 1925-1973. Editorial Jurídica de Chile. Santiago
- Fernández Abara, Joaquín. 2007. El Ibañismo (1937–1952). Un Caso de Populismo en la Política Chilena. Instituto de Historia. Pontificia Universidad Católica de Chile. Santiago.
- Fernández Abara, Joaquín . 2009. “Nacionalistas, antiliberales y reformistas. Las identidades de la militancia ibañista y su trayectoria hacia el populismo (1937-1952)”, en Ulianova, Olga (Editora): Redes políticas y militancias. La historia política está de vuelta. IDEA-USACH/ Ariadna Editores. Santiago.
- Fuentes, Jordi y Lia Cortes. 1967. Diccionario político de Chile. Editorial Orbe. Santiago.
- Jobet, Julio César. 1971. El Partido Socialista de Chile Ediciones Prensa Latinoamericana. Santiago.
