= Sergio Onofre Jarpa =

Chilean politician (1921–2020)

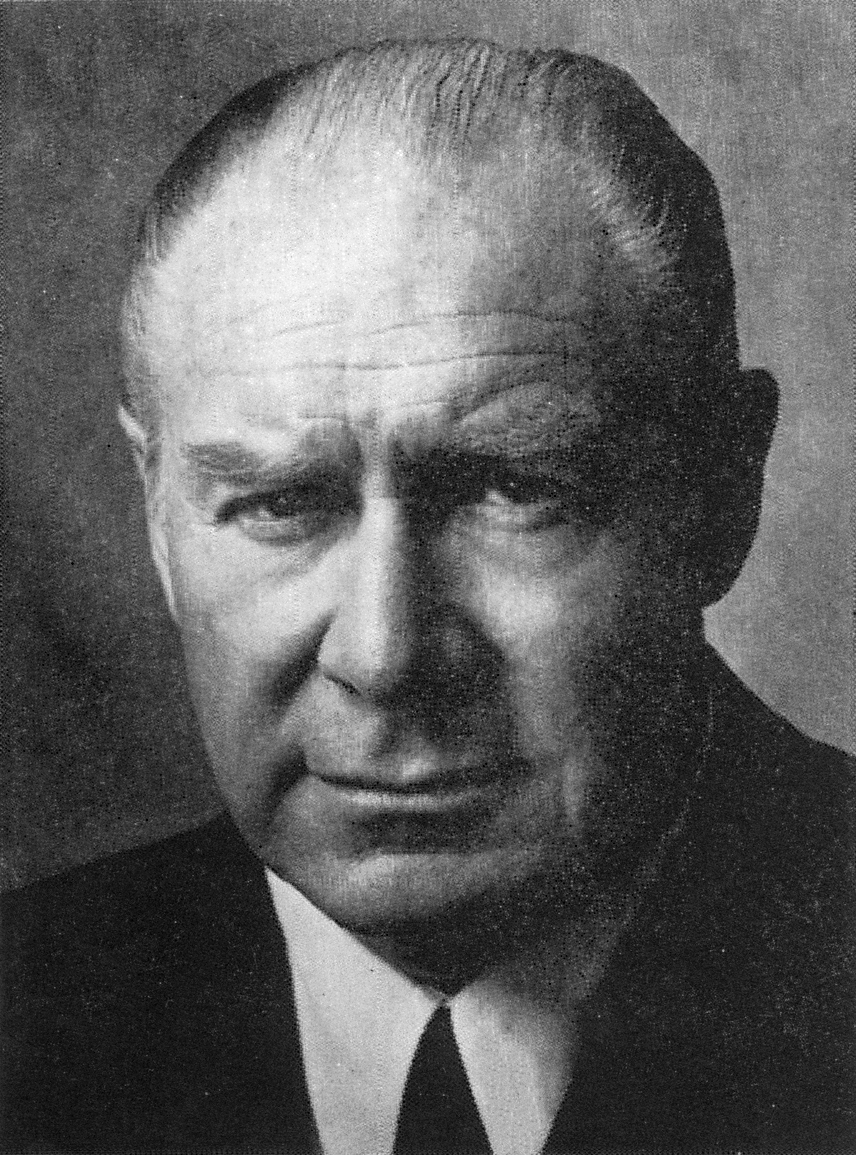

Minister of the Interior
- In office 10 August 1983 – 12 February 1985
- President: Augusto Pinochet
- Preceded by: Enrique Montero Marx
- Succeeded by: Ricardo García Rodríguez

Member of the Senate
- In office 15 May 1973 – 21 September 1973
- Constituency: LIII
- In office 11 March 1990 – 11 March 1994
- Constituency: LV

Personal details
- Born: 8 March 1921 Rengo, Chile
- Died: 19 April 2020 (aged 99) Las Condes
- Party: Popular Freedom Alliance (1938); Popular Socialist Vanguard (1939–1942); Agrarian Labor Party (1950-1958); National Action (1963-1966); National Party (1966-1973); National Labour Front (1985-1987); National Renewal (1987-1997)
- Spouse: Silvia Moreno Andwandter (1950s-1978; her death)
- Domestic partner: Mina Huerta Dunsmore (1980s-present)
- Relations: Onofre Jarpa (ancestor)
- Children: Sergio Jr., Jorge, Francisco, Isabel
- Parent(s): Francisco Javier Jarpa Santa Cruz (father); Raquel Reyes Corona (mother)
- Education: University of Chile
- Occupation: Diplomat, farmer
- Awards: Premio al Mérito Geopolítico (1991)

Sergio Onofre Jarpa Reyes (8 March 1921 – 19 April 2020) was a Chilean right-wing politician who served as one of the founders of the National Renewal party.

== Biography ==
Coming from a rural background, he studied agriculture at the University of Chile. He first became involved in politics in the 1950s, initially with the youth movement of the Agrarian Labor Party before becoming involved in the National Action with Jorge Prat. He was instrumental in the formation of the National Party in 1966 and served as leader of the opposition to the left-wing government and, from 1971, editor of the anti-socialist journal Tribuna.

Elected to the Senate of Chile in the 1973 election, Jarpa became a diplomat following the 1973 Chilean coup d'état, serving as a delegate to the United Nations and before becoming ambassador to Colombia (1976-1978) and then Argentina (1978-1983). Jarpa was appointed Minister of the Interior in 1983 with special orders to open dialogue with the opposition, which had organised under the name Democratic Alliance. This policy of appeasement was quickly abandoned by Pinochet however. He held the post until 1985. He formed his own political movement, the National Labour Front (Frente Nacional del Trabajo), in 1985 and this group was one of the three that formed National Renewal two years later. He returned to the Senate as a representative of this new party in 1990.

Alongside his political career Jarpa was a noted author on socio-political topics and he was awarded the Premio al Mérito Geopolítico by the Chilean Institute of Geopolitics in 1991.

He died from COVID-19 on 19 April 2020, during the COVID-19 pandemic in Chile.
