= National Democratic Party (Chile) =

National Democratic Party Partido Democrático Nacional
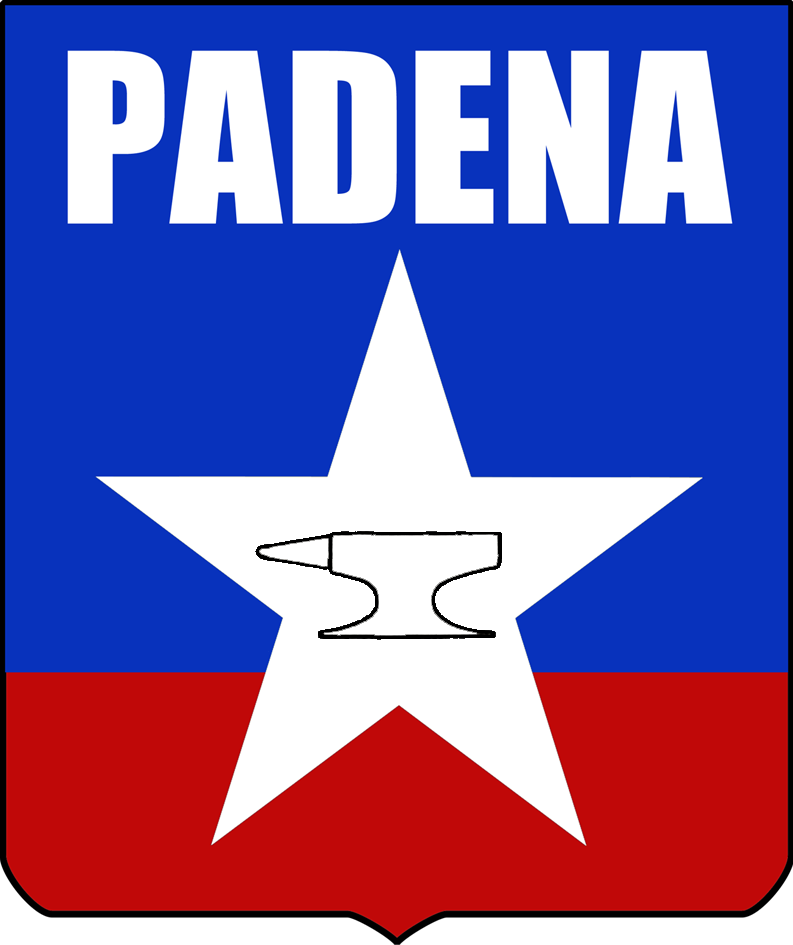
- Founded: 18 September 1960
- Dissolved: 18 May 1999
- Split from: Democratic Party
- Headquarters: Santiago de Chile
- Ideology: Social liberalism Populism
- Political position: Centre

The National Democratic Party (Partido Democrático Nacional), known by its acronym PADENA, was a Chilean political party. This party was one of the last political movements linked to the figure of President Carlos Ibáñez del Campo.

== History ==
It was founded in 1960 by the merger of the Democratic Party, a small faction of the Radical Doctrinal Party, part of the People's National Party (PANAPO), the Democratic Socialist Party and the Social Democratic Party.

It initially participated in the FRAP until Ibáñez' retirement in 1965. The party supported the presidential candidacy of Salvador Allende in 1964, but several parliamentarians withdrew to form the New Democratic Left, which supported Eduardo Frei.

In 1970, the party supported the presidential candidacy of Radomiro Tomic of the Christian Democratic Party in opposition to Allende and Popular Unity. It joined the Confederation of Democracy in 1973.

=== Refoundation, division, and failed legalisation (1983-1999) ===
After the 1973 coup d'état, PADENA entered in political recess and some of its members served in public offices during the military dictatorship. It was refounded in 1983, but two factions were created: one led by Luis Minchel, who opposed the dictatorship, and another led by Apolonides Parra which supported the military regime. Parra's faction in 1984 was part of the Group of Eight and later the National Democratic Agreement.

In 1985, it signed the National Agreement for the Transition to Full Democracy. On 31 January 1986 the faction led by Parra was part of the Frente Democrático de Concordia (FREDECO) along with the Social Democracy Party, the Radical Democracy, the Social Christian Movement, the Radical Civic Union, the Social Democratic Labour Movement, the Javiera Carrera Movement and the Arturo Matte Civic Center.

In 1988, the faction led by Minchel supported the "No" option on the national plebiscite. However, the Parra faction disagreed with Parra and formed the Democratic Party of Chile (PADECH), which supported the "Yes" option and then dissolved and became part of National Renewal. On 2 February 1988, it signed the statement of formation of the Concertación, but it did not get the number of signatures required for its legalisation and was disbanded by the Electoral Service on 12 September of that year.

The PADENA emblem was a rectangular white flag with navy blue trim, and in the center of this a red anvil appeared.

In the 1990s, four attempts were made to legalise PADENA again. These were all unsuccessful due to the refusal of the Electoral Service. The party failed to comply with the legal requirements within the stipulated time frame:

- On 28 June 1991, it was declared a party in formation, and registration was expired on 28 January 1992.
- On 17 February 1994, it was declared a party in formation, and registration was expired on 24 September 1994.
- On 2 October 1997, it presented to the Servel its constitution writing, however this was returned to its authors on 8 October of the same year.
- On 13 October 1998, it was declared a party in formation, and registration was expired on 18 May 1999.

== Presidential candidates ==
Presidential candidates supported by the National Democratic Party.

- 1964: Salvador Allende (lost)
- 1970: Radomiro Tomic (lost)
- 1988: Plebiscite on Augusto Pinochet's presidency: "no" (won)
- 1989: Patricio Aylwin (won)
