= National Party (Chile, 1966) =

National Party Partido Nacional
- President (s): Víctor García Garzena, Sergio Onofre Jarpa, Patricio Phillips, Germán Riesco Zañartu
- Founded: 11 May 1966
- Dissolved: 18 August 1994
- Merger of: United Conservative Party, Liberal Party and National Action
- Merged into: Progressive Union of the Centrist Center
- Headquarters: Santiago de Chile
- Newspaper: Tribuna (1971–1973)
- Paramilitary wing: Rolando Matus Command
- Ideology: National conservatism Economic liberalism Anti-communism
- Political position: Right-wing
- National affiliation: Confederation of Democracy (1972–1973), Alianza (1992–1994)

Party flag

The National Party (Spanish: Partido Nacional, PN) was a Chilean political party formed in 1966 by the union of the United Conservative Party, the Liberal Party and the National Action (founded in 1963 by Jorge Prat Echaurren, who had been Minister of Finances in 1954 in Carlos Ibáñez del Campo's cabinet).

The PN represented the right wing of the Chilean political spectrum, against the centrist Christian Democratic Party and the leftist coalition Popular Unity.

The National Party was created on 11 May 1966 through the merger of the United Conservative Party, the Liberal Party, and National Action. The merger aimed to unite the Chilean right into a single force capable of countering the growing influence of centrist and left-wing movements.

The National Party candidate Jorge Alessandri lost the 1970 presidential election. The party opposed the government of Salvador Allende and his Popular Unity coalition. In August 1973, Three years later, in August 1973, amid intense political polarization, the National Party joined forces with the Christian Democrats in Congress to confront the Allende administration. The following month, newly appointed chief of staff General Augusto Pinochet led the 1973 military coup against Allende.

Following the military coup of 11 September 1973, led by General Augusto Pinochet, the National Party expressed support for the coup and voluntarily dissolved itself on 21 September 1973.

The attempts to reconstitute the National Party from 1983 failed to reunify the Chilean right, whose members instead dispersed among emerging organizations such as National Renewal (RN) and the Independent Democratic Union (UDI). After poor electoral results, the diminished party was formally dissolved in 1994.

== History ==
=== Foundation ===
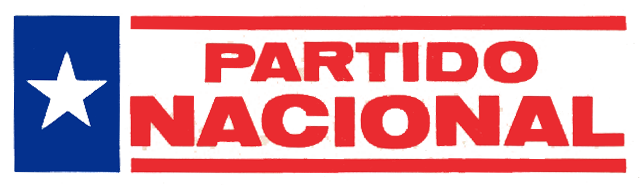
First emblem of the National Party, 1966–1971.

The National Party was created in 1966 following discussions among members of the United Conservative Party, the Liberal Party, National Action and a significant number of independents. Its founders sought to unify the Chilean right into a single organization and attract sectors that had remained outside the traditional parties. The existence of a unified party was also seen as electorally advantageous under a system that favored larger political organizations.

A commission composed of Carlos Ruiz, Jaime Silva Silva, Sergio Onofre Jarpa and Gabriel Cuevas drafted the party statutes, while Víctor García Garzena was chosen by consensus as its first president. The party was formally established on 10 May 1966. For legal purposes, the Liberal Party was renamed as the National Party, while the United Conservative Party was dissolved and its members incorporated into the new organization.

Despite its origins in a merger, the National Party presented itself as a new political organization rather than as a continuation of the Liberal and Conservative parties.

=== Frei era and the 1970 election ===
During the government of Eduardo Frei Montalva, the National Party became a strong opponent of his economic and social reforms. It criticized the expansion of state intervention and bureaucracy, agrarian reform and what it considered the growing leftward orientation of the Christian Democratic Party.

The party also adopted a more confrontational parliamentary strategy than the traditional Chilean right. Internal disputes nevertheless emerged, including the departure of Jorge Prat, while figures such as Sergio Onofre Jarpa and Mario Arnello Romo remained in the organization. The National Party obtained 14.61% of the vote in the 1967 Chilean municipal election and increased its support to 20.82% in the 1969 Chilean parliamentary election.

For the 1970 Chilean presidential election, the party supported former president Jorge Alessandri. During the campaign it developed a political program known as La Nueva República, which proposed strengthening presidential authority, limiting parliamentary intervention in administrative affairs, creating an Economic and Social Council, promoting foreign investment and decentralization, and reforming the pension system.

Alessandri finished second in the election, behind Salvador Allende.

=== Opposition to Salvador Allende ===
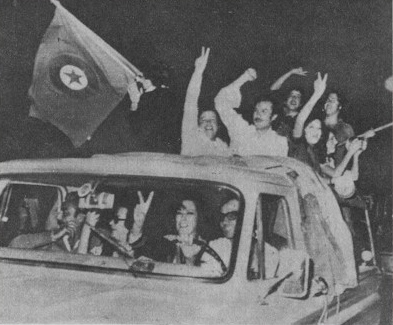
Demonstration in support of the National Party during the 1973 elections.

At the beginning of Allende's government, the National Party initially adopted a relatively open position and supported the nationalization of copper. As political polarization increased, however, it moved toward stronger opposition to the Popular Unity government.

In the 1971 Chilean municipal election, the party received 18.36% of the vote. Following the death of Rolando Matus in that year, the party's youth wing organized the Rolando Matus Command, whose members participated in street confrontations with Popular Unity supporters. The party also intensified its emphasis on nationalism, mass mobilization and cooperation with the Christian Democrats against the government. During this period, the party founded the newspaper Tribuna, which adopted a more aggressive and populist tone than traditional right-wing newspapers.

In 1972, the National Party joined Radical Democracy in the National Federation–Radical Democracy, which became part of the opposition Confederation of Democracy (CODE). The party received 21.5% of the vote in the 1973 Chilean parliamentary election.

During the final months of Allende's presidency, the National Party increasingly called for an early end to the government, supported broader opposition mobilization, opposed negotiations between the Christian Democrats and the government, and rejected granting Allende extraordinary powers following the Tanquetazo. In September 1973, it called for an indefinite national strike aimed at forcing the government from office.

== Presidential candidates ==
The following is a list of the presidential candidates supported by the National Party. (Information gathered from the Archive of Chilean Elections).

- 1970: Jorge Alessandri (lost)
- 1988 plebiscite: In favor of Augusto Pinochet (lost)
- 1989: Francisco Javier Errázuriz (lost)
- 1993: Arturo Alessandri Besa (lost)
