= Presidency of Salvador Allende =

Period of Chilean history from 1970 to 1973

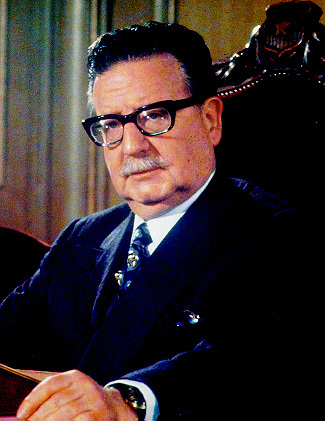
- Official portrait, 1970
- Presidency of Salvador Allende; 3 November 1970 – 11 September 1973
- Party: Popular Unity
- Election: 1970
- Seat: La Moneda Palace, Santiago
- Standard of the President

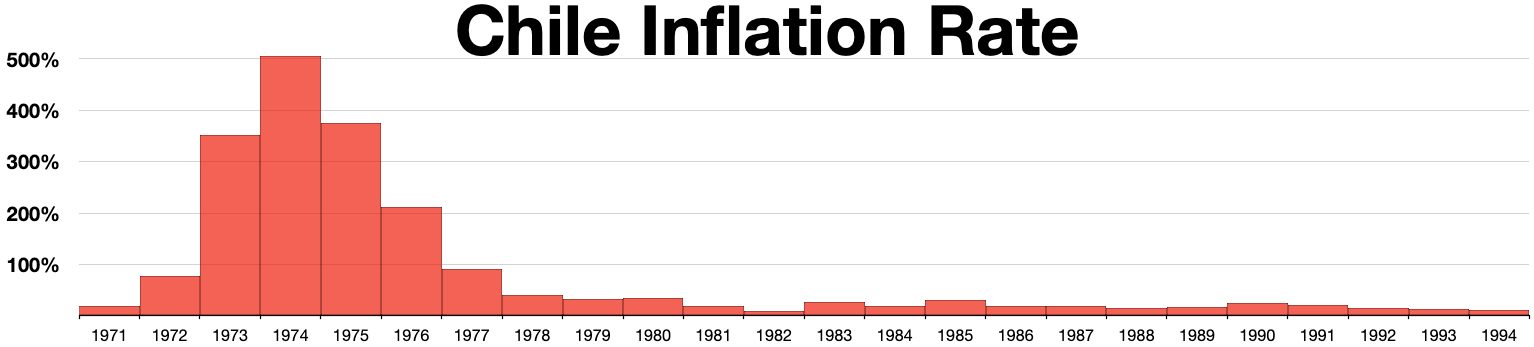
Chile inflation rate 1971–1994

Salvador Allende was the president of Chile from 1970 until his death in 1973, and head of the Popular Unity government; he was a Socialist and the first Marxist elected to the national presidency of a liberal democracy in Latin America. In August 1973, the Chilean Senate declared the Allende administration to be "unlawful", and Allende's presidency was ended by a military coup before the end of his term.

During his tenure, Chilean politics reached a state of civil unrest amid political polarization, hyperinflation, lockouts, economic sanctions, CIA-sponsored interventionism and a failed coup in June 1973. Allende's coalition, Unidad Popular, faced the problem of being a minority in the congress and it was plagued by factionalism.

On 11 September 1973, a successful coup led by General Augusto Pinochet overthrew the government of Allende. During the bombing of the presidential palace by the Chilean Air Force, President Allende, after mounting a brief armed resistance against the military, eventually died by suicide. In Chilean historiography, Allende's presidency is the last one of the period known as the "Presidential Republic" (1925–1973).

== Election and Inauguration ==
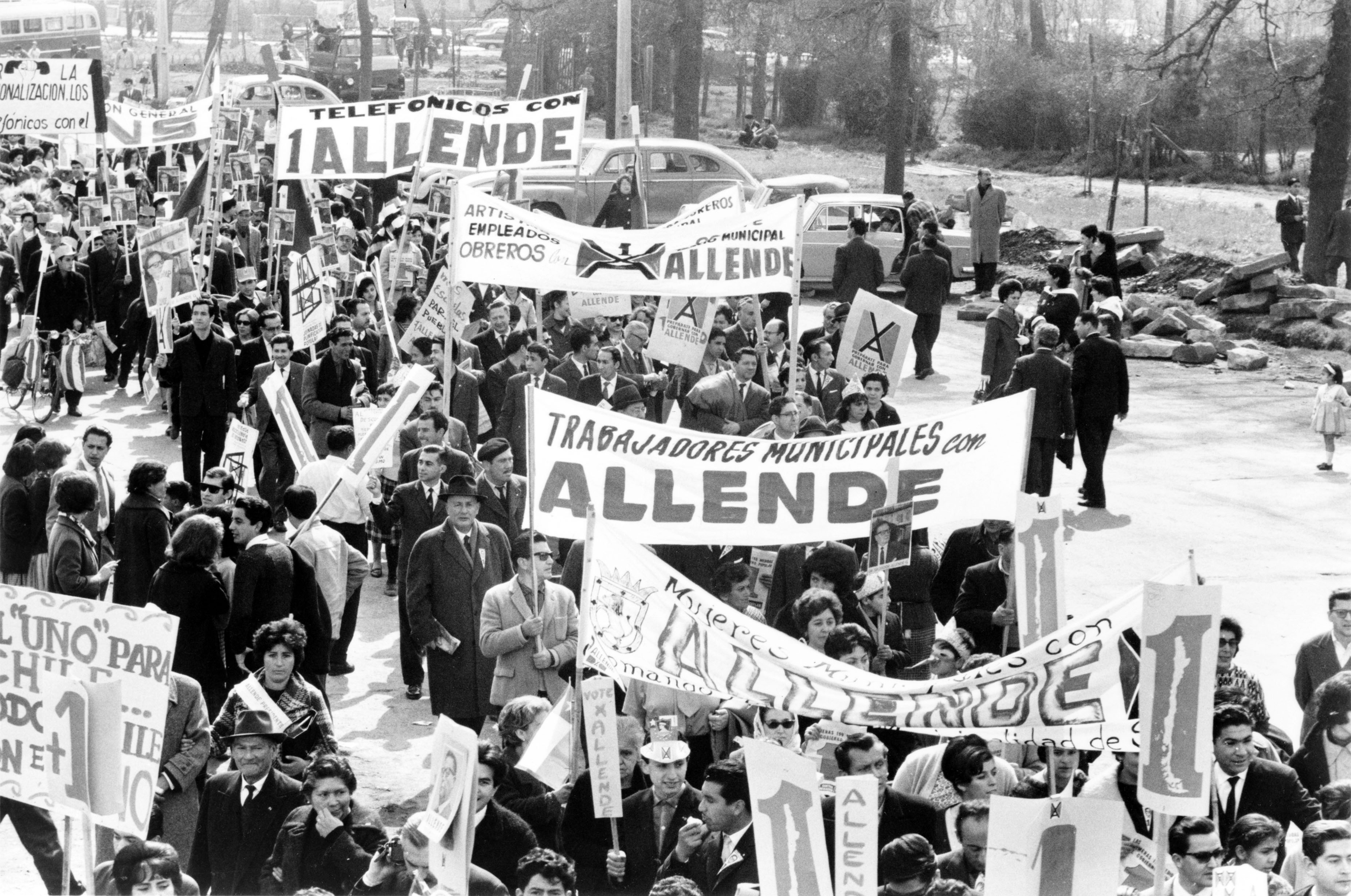
Chileans marching in support of Allende

In the 1970 election, Allende ran with the Unidad Popular (UP or Popular Unity) coalition. Succeeding the FRAP left-wing coalition, Unidad Popular comprised most of the Chilean Left: the Socialist Party, the Communist Party, the Radical Party, the Party of the Radical Left (until 1972), the Social Democratic Party, MAPU (Movimiento de Acción Popular Unitario) (in 1972, a splinter group – MAPU Obrero Campesino – emerged) and since 1971 the Christian Left.

Allende received a plurality with 36.2% of the vote. Christian Democrat Radomiro Tomic won 27.8% with a very similar platform to Allende's. Both Allende and Tomic promised to further nationalize the mineral industry and redistribute land and income among other new policies. Conservative former president Jorge Alessandri, standing for the National Party, received slightly under 34.9% of the vote.

According to the constitution, Congress had to decide between the two candidates who had received the most votes. The precedent set on the three previous occasions this situation had arisen since 1932 was for Congress simply to choose the candidate with the largest number of votes; indeed, former president Alessandri had been elected in 1958 with 31.6% of the popular vote.

In this case, however, there was an active campaign against Allende's confirmation by Congress, including clandestine efforts to prevent him taking office, and his presidency was ratified only after he signed a "Statute of Constitutional Guarantees". This statute was suggested as a means to convince the majority of Christian Democrat senators that favoured Allessandri, as they doubted Allende's allegiance to democracy, or at least the UP's. After signing the statute, members of the Christian Democrat party in the Senate gave their vote in favor of Allende. It has been argued that given that less than the majority of the voters voted for him, Allende did not have a clear "mandate" to embark in the policies put forward on his program; however, it is also true that in the post-World War II period three out of the four previous presidents of Chile had, like Allende, also been elected with less than 50% of the vote, due in part to Chile's multi-party system. Specifically, the winners of the four presidential elections prior to Allende's 1970 election had won with: 56.1% (the 1964 election of Frei), 31.6% (the 1958 election of Alessandri), 46.8% (the 1952 election of Ibáñez) and 40.2% (the 1946 election of Gonzalez Videla). The legality of the 1970 election itself is not in dispute.

On 4 November, Allende assumed the presidency in the National Congress. Afterwards he went to the cathedral to attend the ecumenical Te Deum celebrated by all the churches of Chile.

== "The Chilean Way to Socialism" ==
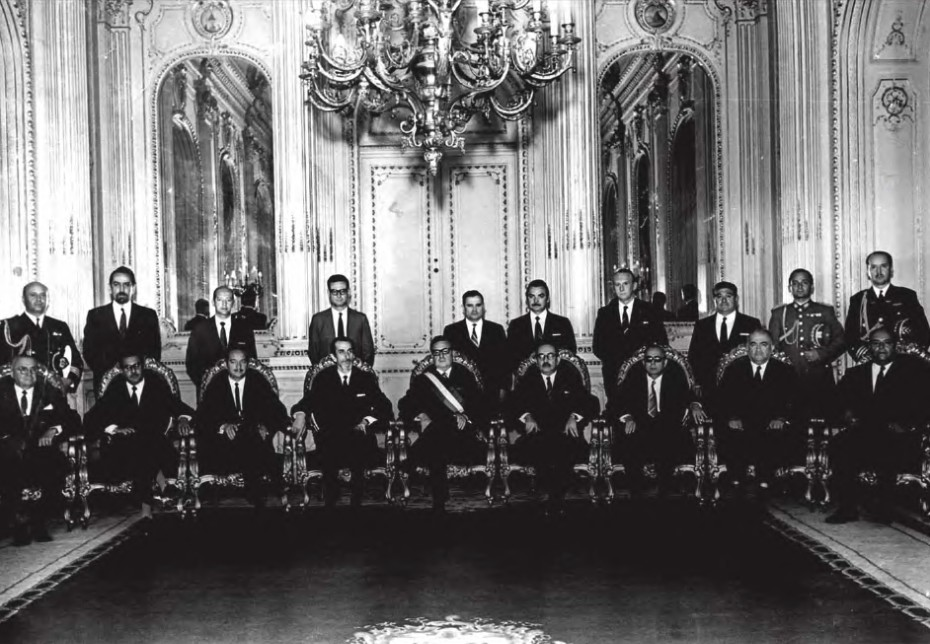
Salvador Allende and his cabinet ministers in 1970.

In office, Allende pursued a policy he called "La vía chilena al socialismo" (Spanish for "The Chilean Way to Socialism"). This included nationalization of certain large-scale industries (notably copper), of the healthcare system, continuation of his predecessor Eduardo Frei Montalva's policies regarding the educational system, a program of free milk for children, and land redistribution. The previous government of Eduardo Frei had already partly nationalised the copper industry by acquiring a 51 percent share in foreign owned mines. The primary U.S. business in Chile at this time was copper mining. The Chilean government sought to fully nationalize U.S. mining operations and the Chilean constitution required "just compensation" to be made according to "minimum international standards." However, the Allende government chose to hold mining companies liable for damages they caused to the state. Subsequently, Chile made significant deductions in computing the amount of compensation due to the North American industries. Such deductions included charges for "loans invested poorly" and "excessive profits" among other reasoning. "Excessive profits" were assessed dating back to the 1950s. Ultimately, deductions for "social and financial malfeasance" when combined with other deductions resulted in the total deductions greatly exceeding the base book values of the mining enterprises. In effect, compensation to three of the five nationalized mines was wholly eliminated by subjective deductions determined by Allende's government. Allende also nationalized coal mining in 1971, a move that was welcomed by the miners of Lota. A system of clinics in working-class neighborhoods on the peripheries of Chile’s major cities was also set up.

The constitutional changes for the transition from capitalism to socialism that the government of Salvador Allende wanted to carry out have been referred to as the “Chilean path to socialism” or as the “peaceful path to socialism”. The Popular Unity Basic Government Program for Salvador Allende's candidacy included proposals organized around several axes. Among them were a new political constitution, the creation of a People's Assembly, the development of a planned economy, the nationalization of basic wealth in the hands of foreign capital and domestic monopolies, and the creation of a Mixed Area, a Private Area and a Social Property Area (APS), among several other points. The character of the “Chilean path to socialism” constituted a global novelty, since up to that point there had been no political experience advocating the development of socialism through electoral means. Although the parties grouped in Popular Unity accepted and submitted themselves to the rules of the electoral path, their goal in winning state power was to create a new institutional framework in accordance with socialist principles. Regarding the state and its role, the Popular Unity government program contemplated three characteristics:

1. A gradual and peaceful transition to socialism
2. Rejection of the notion of the dictatorship of the proletariat as a transitional state form
3. Consolidation of the national character of the branches of the Chilean Armed Forces and their integration into social and economic development tasks

Chilean presidents were allowed a maximum of six years in office, which may explain Allende's haste to restructure the economy. He had a significant restructuring program organized.

At the beginning, there was broad support in Congress to expand the government's already large part of the economy, as the Popular Unity and Christian Democrats together had a clear majority. But the government's efforts to pursue these policies led to strong opposition by landowners, some middle-class sectors, the rightist National Party, financiers, and the Roman Catholic Church (which in 1973 was displeased with the direction of the educational policy). Eventually the Christian Democrats united with the National Party in Congress.

The Popular Unity coalition itself was far from unanimous. Allende himself said he was committed to democracy and represented a more moderate faction of his Socialist Party. He was supported by the Communist Party, that – despite being ultimately less committed to representative democracy – favoured a cautious, gradual approach. For example, the Communists urged to find a compromise with the Christian Democrats and supported the application of reforms through Congress. In contrast, the radical leftist wing of the Socialist Party wanted to smash the capitalist system at once, even if that meant violent actions. If one includes smaller parties, Allende's moderate left-wing line was supported by moderate Socialists, Communists, Radicals (Social Democrats merged with that party in June 1972) and part of the MAPU (later: MAPU/OC), whereas the left-wing Socialists (led by Altamirano), the extremist elements of the MAPU, of the Christian Left and the MIR (not belonging to the Unidad Popular) represented the far-left.

Allende believed in peaceful change, arguing that capitalism could be ended in Chile through democratic means. As he noted in a 1972 speech

My Government maintains that there is another path for the revolutionary process that is not the violent destruction of the current institutional and constitutional regime.

The entities of the State administration act today not at the service of the ruling class, but at the service of the workers and the continuity of the revolutionary process; therefore, one cannot try to destroy what is now an instrument to act, change, and create for the benefit of Chile and its labor masses.

The power of the big bourgeoisie is not based on the Institutional regime, but on its economic resources and on the complex web of social relations linked to the capitalist property system.

We do not see the path of the Chilean revolution in the violent bankruptcy of the state apparatus. What our people have built over several generations of struggle allows them to take advantage of the conditions created by our history to replace the capitalist foundation of the current institutional regime with another that is adapted to the new social reality.

The popular political parties and movements have always affirmed, and this is contained in the Government Program, that ending the capitalist system requires transforming the class content of the State and of the Fundamental Charter itself. But we have also solemnly affirmed our will to carry it out in accordance with the mechanisms that the Political Constitution has expressly established to be modified.

The great question that the revolutionary process has raised, and that will decide the fate of Chile, is whether the current institutional framework can open the way for the transition to socialism. The answer depends on the degree to which it remains open to change and on the social forces that give it its content. Only if the state apparatus can be crossed by the popular social forces, will the institutionality have enough flexibility to tolerate and promote structural transformations without disintegrating.

Such a transcendental problem was posed crudely from September 4, 1970. The anti-capitalist social forces came to the Government through the regular functioning of the institutional regime. If it had been closed, at that moment the institutionality would have broken down and Chile would have been a victim of the violence unleashed.

Allende also saw his government as representing a transition step between capitalism and socialism, stating in a 1973 speech

Hence, then, also informed by comrade Godoy, I can say that with satisfaction we know that the large centers that bring together the workers of the world, are studying the possibility of a meeting aimed fundamentally at drawing the lines of resistance to the penetration of transnational companies, subjecting countries to the political pressure they exert through venal politicians, or using the influence of their governments, or simply deforming their economy based on a development that only seeks their interests, against the general interest of the country in which they invest their capital. For this reason, it is also when this 20th Anniversary is celebrated, as your Comrade President, along with paying tribute to those who fell in the struggle, and highlighting those who with their life and example have given moral strength to the Unified Workers' Centre, I have to point out that this Government, which has faced the most powerful enemies from outside and inside; that this Government, in a country where capitalism exists, has its own path according to our history and tradition; that this Government seeks structural changes in pluralism, democracy and freedom; that this Government is an accelerated transition step between capitalism and socialism. That this Government has to make revolutionary changes within the framework of a bourgeois institutional framework, with an autonomous Judicial Branch, where laws are applied that have already lost their content and meaning; that this Government, which has a majority opposition Parliament; that this Government that respects ideological pluralism, doctrines and ideas; that this Government, which like no other, has been respectful of religious beliefs – the Ecumenical Tedeum demonstrates this –; that this Government, which has respected freedom of information, of the press, of assembly and of association, like no other; than this Government, which has not and will never resort to using repressive forces, not even against its most bitter adversaries.

The land-redistribution that Allende highlighted as one of the central policies of his government had already begun under his predecessor Eduardo Frei Montalva, who had expropriated between one-fifth and one-quarter of all properties liable to takeover. The Allende government's intention was to appropriate all holdings of more than eighty basic irrigated hectares. Allende also intended to improve the socio-economic welfare of Chile's poorest citizens; a key element was to provide employment, either in the new nationalized enterprises or on public works projects.

Towards the end of 1971, Fidel Castro toured Chile extensively during a four-week visit. This gave credence to the belief of those on the right that "The Chilean Way to Socialism" was an effort to put Chile on the same path as Cuba.

Today, The Chilean Way to Socialism is often associated with the democratic road to socialism, a form of democratic socialism emphasizing representative democracy and the development of an organized working class.

=== Mixed Area, Private Area and Social Property Area (APS) ===
According to the parameters established by the government of Salvador Allende, the national economy was to be divided into three areas: the Social Property Area (APS), the Mixed Area and the Private Area. First, the Social Property Area (APS) was to be the dominant sector of the economy, encompassing approximately 200 large monopolistic companies and state-owned enterprises. Second, the Mixed Area included national or foreign private companies with state participation. Third and finally, there was the Private Area, which included a number of small and medium-sized companies. The APS played a crucial role within the government of Salvador Allende, since its objective was to free the country from dependence on foreign capital, orient production to satisfy the needs of the majority of the population, increase employment, control inflation, etc.

In order to carry out one of the measures of the Popular Unity government program called “a new economy to stop inflation”, the government opted to nationalize strategic companies, while the number of companies incorporated into the APS motivated the Allende government to apply a cybernetic management model known as Cybersyn—a system that proved crucial in addressing the effects of the October 1972 strike. Both APS companies and those in the Mixed Area would be managed by CORFO, which would classify its companies into four sectors: consumer goods, light industry, construction materials and heavy industry.

By the end of August 1971, the Allende government had transferred the largest mining companies and 68 of the most important companies in the private sector to the public sector. These measures were part of what was called the “battle for production”, since for the Popular Unity government increasing levels of industrial production was central to the success of Chilean socialism.

=== Agrarian reform ===
According to the statistics mentioned in the Basic Program of Government of Popular Unity, it was stated that 50% of the population under 15 years of age suffered from child malnutrition, a situation that limited their ability to receive education. Using this data, the program argued that the economic system in general and the agricultural system in particular were incapable of feeding the Chilean population. It was also noted that rates of infant mortality and adult mortality, illiteracy and poor sanitary conditions were markedly higher in rural areas than in urban areas. In view of these points, the program linked all of these problems with the existence of the latifundium.

The Popular Unity government relied on Law 16,640 to support its project of agrarian reform. This law had been introduced by Eduardo Frei Montalva in 1967 and was promulgated the same year.

The government of Salvador Allende proposed intensifying the expropriation of estates exceeding the established maximum size (80 hectares of basic irrigated land) within the framework of its own legal mechanisms and planning. Following this approach, the government set out seven directives in its program regarding agrarian reform:

1. Acceleration of the agrarian reform process by expropriating estates exceeding the established maximum size, according to the conditions of the different regions, including fruit, wine-producing and forestry estates, without the owner having preferential rights to select the reserve. Expropriation could include all or part of the assets of the expropriated estates (machinery, tools, animals, etc.).

2. Immediate incorporation into agricultural production of abandoned or poorly exploited state-owned lands.

3. Expropriated lands would preferably be organized into cooperative forms of ownership. Peasants would receive property titles certifying ownership of the house and garden assigned to them and the corresponding rights within the cooperative's indivisible estate. When conditions made it advisable, land would be assigned as personal property to peasants, promoting the organization of work and marketing on the basis of mutual cooperation. Land would also be allocated to create state agricultural enterprises using modern technology.

4. In qualified cases, land would be assigned to small farmers, tenants, sharecroppers and agricultural employees trained in agricultural work.

5. Reorganization of smallholdings through progressively cooperative forms of agricultural work.

6. Incorporation of small and medium-sized peasants into the benefits and services of cooperatives operating in their geographical area.

7. Defense of the integrity, expansion and democratic leadership of indigenous communities threatened by usurpation, ensuring that the Mapuche people and other Indigenous peoples receive sufficient land as well as appropriate technical and credit assistance.

The agrarian reform process in Chile can be divided into three phases: the first under the government of Jorge Alessandri, the second under Eduardo Frei Montalva, and the last during the government of Salvador Allende. However, the implementation of the latter became complex due to the political polarization between sectors supporting the reform and those opposing it. Differences and political rivalries among political parties and movements present in the countryside also influenced the process.

On the one hand, the anti-reform sector was led by entrepreneurs, estate owners and large landowners grouped in the National Agriculture Society (SNA), the National Confederation of Agricultural Employers and the newspaper chain of El Mercurio. On the other hand, the sector aligned with government policy included the Communist Party of Chile, the Radical Party of Chile and a sector of the Socialist Party of Chile.

Another sector comprised political groups forming the so-called “revolutionary pole”, namely the Revolutionary Left Movement (MIR), the Christian Left (IC), the Popular Unitary Action Movement (MAPU) and the Socialist Party led by Carlos Altamirano. The MIR maintained distance from the Popular Unity agrarian reform, demanding in the Linares Declaration that the minimum number of irrigated hectares for expropriation be reduced from 80 to 40, that expropriation be carried out without indemnity, and that all assets belonging to the expropriated hacienda be transferred to guarantee production.

Despite this distance, the Revolutionary Peasant Movement (MCR), the MIR's mass front,

(…) participated in the agrarian reform process promoted by Popular Unity, agreeing on the need to deepen the restitution of usurped lands and accelerate expropriations to eliminate the latifundium, while sharply disagreeing on the methods to achieve these objectives.

In summary, there was a fundamental difference between the Popular Unity government's proposal for an “orderly agrarian reform” and the MCR's preference for extralegal actions and a “revolutionary path” for Chile.

Following this line, peasants and MCR militants continued carrying out land occupations and “fence-moving” actions in Malleco Province and Cautín Province, practices that had begun shortly before Allende assumed office. These actions were partially justified by the principles of Law 16,640, which facilitated expropriation of estates exceeding 80 irrigated hectares that were abandoned or poorly exploited.

A distinction must be made between land occupations and “fence-moving”. While land occupations involved both Mapuche and Chileans, fence-moving actions were carried out by Mapuche communities and aimed to restore “the original boundaries of the títulos de merced on neighboring estates that had usurped Mapuche lands”.

The response from landowner and employer organizations intensified as well. They organized armed groups known as “white guards”, encouraged workers to occupy estates to resist expropriation and expelled peasants from occupied lands. In some cases these actions had fatal consequences for participating peasants. Examples occurred in several localities in southern Chile: in Frutillar three peasants were killed by “white guards” in 1972, in Lautaro the Mapuche peasant Juan Milipán died during a confrontation in the occupation of Fundo Brasil Sur, and in Loncoche the peasant and MIR militant Moisés Huentelaf was killed during the occupation of Fundo Chesque in 1971.

As in the government of Eduardo Frei Montalva, expropriated lands were organized into “settlements”, a transitional form of agricultural organization for managing and exploiting expropriated estates. Because the Popular Unity government could not pass its own agrarian reform law or amend Law 16,640 due to lack of a parliamentary majority, guidelines for settlement organization came from various ideological and political sources.

This situation led to three different expectations regarding settlement land tenure. The first, held by the government, saw them as a transitional stage toward state agricultural enterprises within a planned economy. The second proposed that settlements function as cooperative farms whose land and fixed capital were collectively owned and whose profits were distributed equally. Finally, the third expected settlements eventually to be divided into individual family farms.

=== People's Assembly ===
Within the government's political program was the proposal to create a People's Assembly, a unicameral body where different currents of opinion would converge and which would serve as the supreme organ of power. Under this system there would be mechanisms for consultation and recall of political representatives by those they represented.

=== Remuneration ===
The Popular Unity government program proposed the creation of a system of minimum wages with equal levels for equal work regardless of the enterprise where the work was performed. This policy was intended initially for the state sector but would later be extended to the entire economic system. Similarly, the program sought to implement a wage system that did not discriminate between men and women or according to workers' age.

=== Housing ===
A section of the Popular Unity government program addressed housing policy. First, the program proposed implementing a housing construction plan and the industrialization of construction while limiting the profits of mixed enterprises and private companies operating in the sector. Second, in urgent cases land would be assigned to families so they could build their homes with technical assistance and provision of materials. Third, the central objective of the housing policy was that each family would become the owner of its own home while limiting monthly payments and rents to a maximum of 10% of household income.

== Economics ==
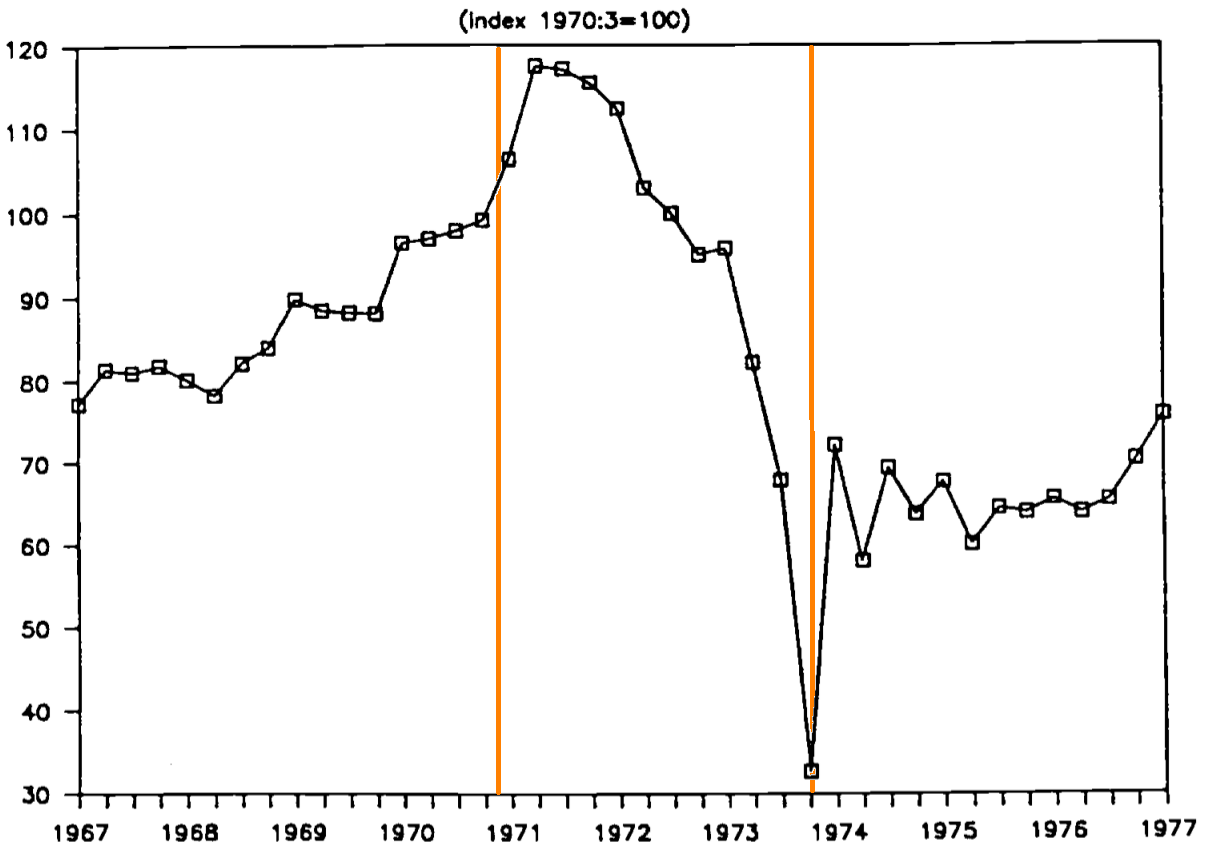
Chile real wages between 1967 and 1977. Orange lines mark the beginning and end of Allende's presidency.

The head of the government's economic policy was Pedro Vuskovic, who would carry out the plan for the transition from capitalism to socialism. These actions combined socialist economic policies with others aimed at achieving rapid economic reactivation following a drastic redistribution of wealth. The plan contained three main pillars: the nationalization of copper, an agrarian reform and the creation of the Social Property Area (APS), which was composed of the principal monopolistic companies in banking, industry and distribution. The nationalization of companies was carried out through the use of certain legal loopholes (Decree Law No. 520 of 1932), which dated back to the Socialist Republic of Chile and had fallen into disuse, although they still retained legal validity. The process consisted of allowing the state to intervene in companies considered key to the economy whenever they halted production so that they would resume operations. The system was judged illegal by the opposition but was ruled legal by the Comptroller General of the Republic.

The nationalization of mining, by contrast, was carried out with the unanimous support of all political sectors, with the law (No. 17,450 promulgated on 15 July) approved unanimously in the National Congress. The mining companies were to be paid compensation, but deducting the “excess profits” they had obtained in previous years due to the low (or nonexistent) taxes they paid, based on what was considered a “reasonable” profitability of 10% from 1955 onward. Under this system, the companies Anaconda and Kennecott did not receive a single peso and ultimately owed the Chilean state millions.

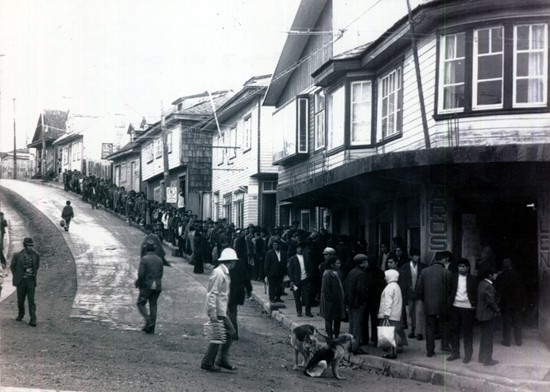
Queues due to shortages of products during the government of Salvador Allende in 1972.

During the first year of the Popular Unity government, the price freeze and wage increases worked: the money supply doubled. Support for the Popular Unity (UP) was also boosted when the national poet Pablo Neruda, a member of the Communist Party, received the Nobel Prize in Literature that same year. In this climate, Popular Unity obtained 49.731% of the vote in the municipal elections. (Note: According to a special feature from the newspaper La Tercera and also, though less precisely, at www.salvador-allende.cl. Other versions, apparently excluding blank and null ballots, report 50.86%; see 1.) A considerable redistribution of income was achieved, unemployment was reduced to 3.8%, and both production and consumption increased. More specifically, industrial production increased by 14% between July 1970 and July 1971, wages rose by 55%, annual inflation fell from 35% to 20%, and gross domestic product increased by 8.3%. Conversely, from the second year of Salvador Allende's term, inflation increased, a situation compounded by external and internal conspiratorial actions, the fall in the price of copper and the decline in overall production due to the state of general mobilization among sectors of Chilean society.

By the end of 1971, the first economic problems appeared. The budget deficit grew rapidly, rising from 3.5% of GDP in 1970 to 9.8% in 1971; monetary policy became uncontrolled as public-sector credit expanded by 124%; the level of international reserves fell from US$394 million (1970) to US$163 million (1971), leading the Popular Unity government to suspend servicing the external debt; the trade balance shifted from a surplus of US$95 million at the beginning of the government to a deficit of US$90 million after the abrupt fall in the price of copper; because of the increase in real wages and price controls, corporate profits contracted; and the first signs of shortages appeared in the second quarter of 1971, culminating in the emergence of a flourishing black market.

In 1972 the Chilean escudo changed 140%. The average Real GDP contracted between 1971 and 1973 at an annual rate of 5.6% ("negative growth"), and the government's fiscal deficit soared while foreign reserves declined. During this time, a shortage in basic commodities led to the rise of black markets which ended in late 1973 after Allende was ousted.

In addition to the earlier-discussed provision of employment, Allende also raised wages on a number of occasions throughout 1970 and 1971. These rises in wages were negated by continuing increases in prices for food. Although price rises had also been high under Frei (27% a year between 1967 and 1970), a basic basket of consumer goods rose by 120% from 190 to 421 escudos in one month alone, August 1972. In the period 1970–72, while Allende was in government, exports fell 24% and imports rose 26%, with imports of food rising an estimated 149%. However, although the acceleration of inflation in 1972 and 1973 eroded part of the initial increase in wages, the real minimum wage still rose (on average) during the 1971–73 period. Another study has asserted that during the last few months of the Popular Unity coalition’s time in office, "real wages were at least equal to, if not higher than, those of 1968–69."

The falls in exports were mostly due to a fall in the price of copper. Chile was at the mercy of international fluctuations in the value of its single most important export. As with almost half of developing countries, more than 50 percent of Chile's export receipts were from a single primary commodity. Adverse fluctuation in the international price of copper negatively affected the Chilean economy throughout 1971-72. The price of copper fell from a peak of $66 per ton in 1970 to only $48–49 in 1971 and 1972. In addition to the hyperinflation, the fall in the value of copper and lack of economic aid would further depress the economy.

Initially, the governing coalition expected the unearned wage increases and the consequent increase in government spending to be corrected once the 'structural changes' like nationalisation and agrarian reforms were completed. However, by June 1972, Allende was beginning to see the economic hazards. The minister of economy was changed and some austerity measures introduced, but to little avail.

Amidst declining economic indicators, Allende's Popular Unity coalition actually increased its vote to 43 percent in the parliamentary elections early in 1973. However, by this point what had started as an informal alliance with the Christian Democrats was anything but that. The Christian Democrats now leagued with the right-wing National Party and other three minor parties to oppose Allende's government, the five parties calling themselves the Confederation of Democracy (CODE). The conflict between the executive and legislature paralyzed initiatives from either side. His economic policies were used by economists Rudi Dornbusch and Sebastian Edwards to coin the term macroeconomic populism.

=== 1973 economic crisis ===
The economic crisis in Chile in 1973 was a severe economic collapse caused by both exogenous and endogenous factors that occurred during the government of Salvador Allende. It was one of the catalysts of the political crisis experienced by the country during the government of Popular Unity and was also one of the most relevant factors that led to the 1973 Chilean coup d'état. This economic crisis was reflected in three-digit inflation–contemporary estimates calculate that it reached 606%, the highest in the history of Chile.

==== Causes ====
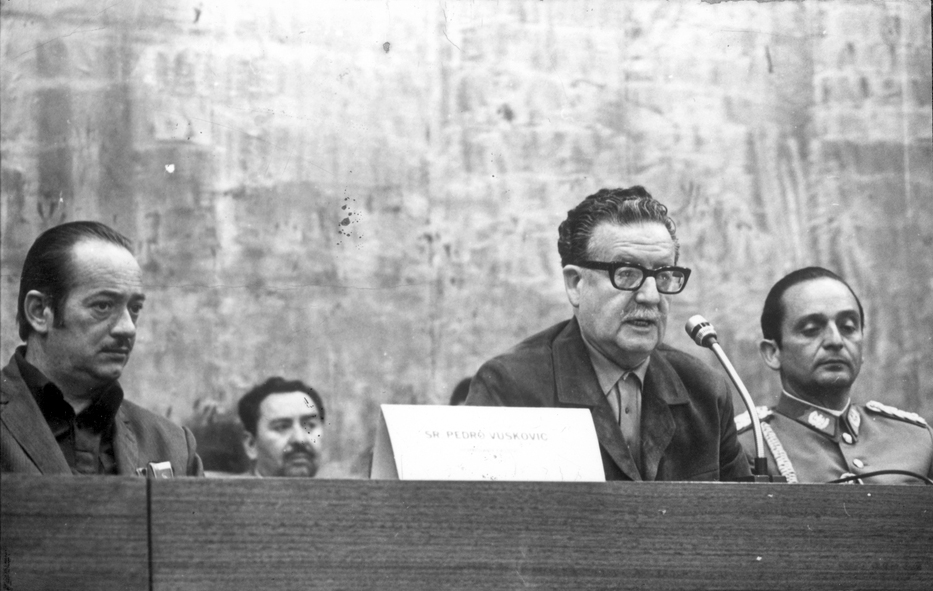
Minister Pedro Vuskovic with President Salvador Allende, architects of the Vuskovic plan.

To date, there are two main lines of interpretation to explain the economic crisis of the government of Salvador Allende. Some emphasize the little importance that the Popular Unity government gave to stabilizing the economy, specifically inflation (CPI), which had been rising since the previous government and reached 36.5% in 1969, in addition to external economic factors such as the international oil crisis.

In the days following Salvador Allende's narrow election as president of Chile on 4 September 1970, Henry Kissinger held a series of urgent telephone conversations on “how to do it” in Chile. “We will not let Chile go down the drain,” Kissinger said in one of those calls to CIA director Richard Helms, who replied, “I’m with you.” On 15 September, during a fifteen-minute meeting at the White House attended by Kissinger, President Nixon instructed CIA director Richard Helms that Allende’s election was unacceptable, ordering the agency to act with his well-known phrase “make the Chilean economy scream,” as Helms recorded in his notes.

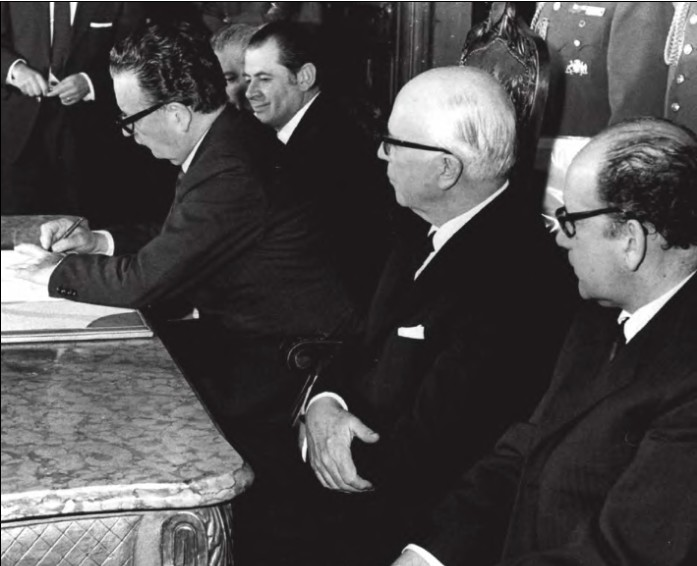
Salvador Allende signs the promulgating decree of the constitutional reform that began the Chilean nationalization of copper.

The first major attempt to carry out a series of reforms to change the system had been made by Eduardo Frei Montalva and the Christian Democrats during his six-year term (1964–1970), with measures such as the agrarian reform, the Chilenization of copper, reduction of inflation, and others, which pointed to a third way between capitalism and communism. The program became known as the Revolution in Liberty.

Another cause was the economic boycott promoted by the opposition to destabilize the government, characterized by business closures, transport strikes, destruction and hoarding of products in order to generate shortages among the population, among other things. There was also the economic embargo imposed by the United States, which cut credit lines, blocked Chilean accounts in the U.S., and pressured financial institutions not to invest in Chile as retaliation for the nationalization of copper. According to the French academic Christian Delois, as a result of U.S. pressure, of the 270 million dollars intended for Chile in 1972, it received only 32.

==== Fiscal deficit and loss of reserves ====
The public sector deficit went from -1.4% of gross domestic product (GDP) in 1970 to -22.9% in 1973.

==== Nationalization of copper ====
The nationalization of mining, by contrast, was carried out with the unanimous support of all political sectors, with the law (No. 17,450 promulgated on 15 July) approved unanimously in the National Congress. Mining companies were to be paid compensation.

The nationalization of mining by the Allende government angered the government of the United States and led Richard Nixon and his Secretary of State, Henry Kissinger, to promote a boycott against the Allende government by denying external credits and seeking an embargo on Chilean copper.

==== Measures implemented ====
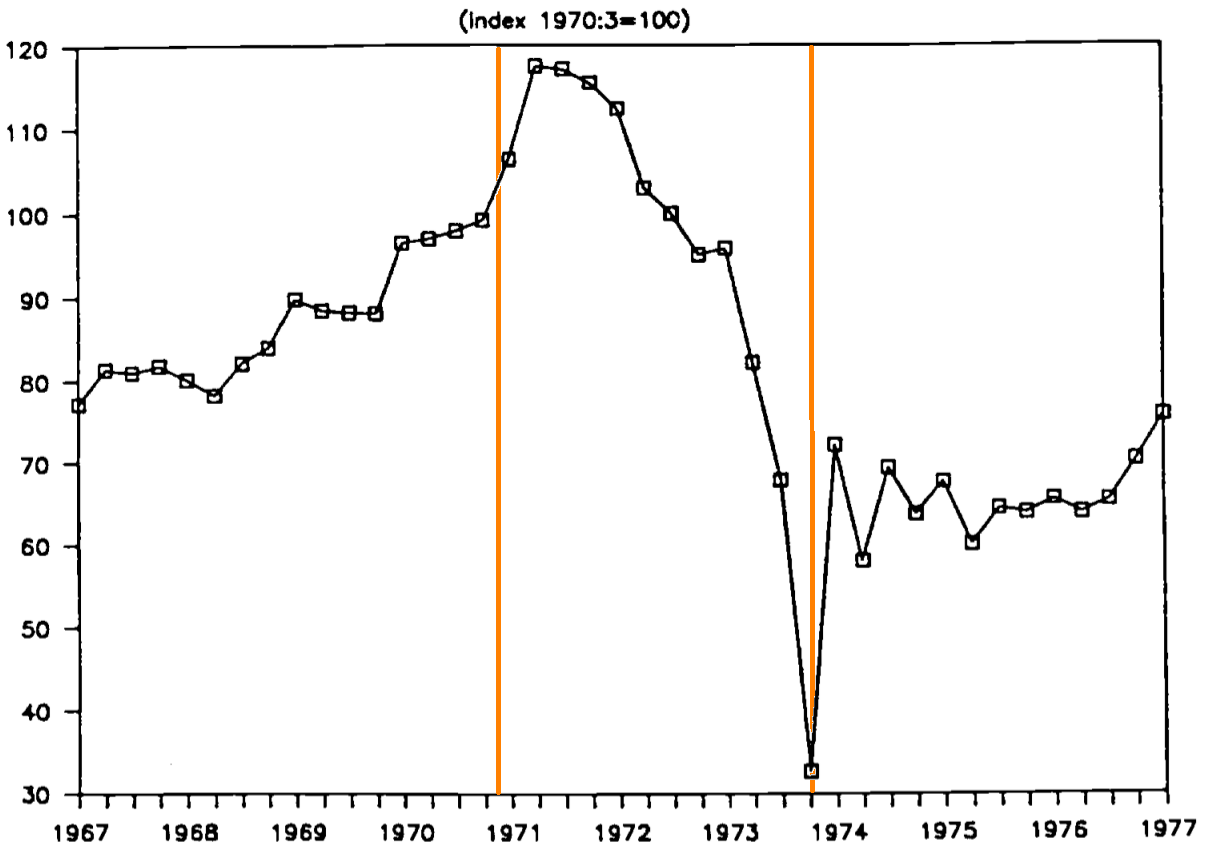
Real wages in Chile between 1967 and 1977. The orange lines mark the beginning and end of Allende's presidency.

The Chilean government favored the engulfment of the national economy by the state, as can be seen in the increase of state participation in mining (from 13% in 1965 to 85% in 1973), in industry (from 3% in 1965 to 40% in 1973), in transport (from 24.3% in 1965 to 70% in 1973), and in the “Product of all sectors” (except agriculture) (from 14.2% in 1965 to 39% in 1973).

=== Development of the industrial cordons ===
In response to the lockout initiated by organizations such as the Chamber of Commerce and the Confederation of Production and Commerce, factory occupations increased significantly. Previously, occupations of productive units had already occurred, but they expanded greatly beginning in October 1972 in order to "ensure the continuity of the productive process under workers' control and the defense of the government". After the lockout, the industrial cordons emerged, which were groupings of factories and companies that coordinated the actions and tasks of workers within the same area. The industrial cordons maintained contact in order to coordinate joint protest actions or to exchange raw materials needed to sustain production.

== Education policy ==
=== Attempt to develop the National Unified School (ENU) ===
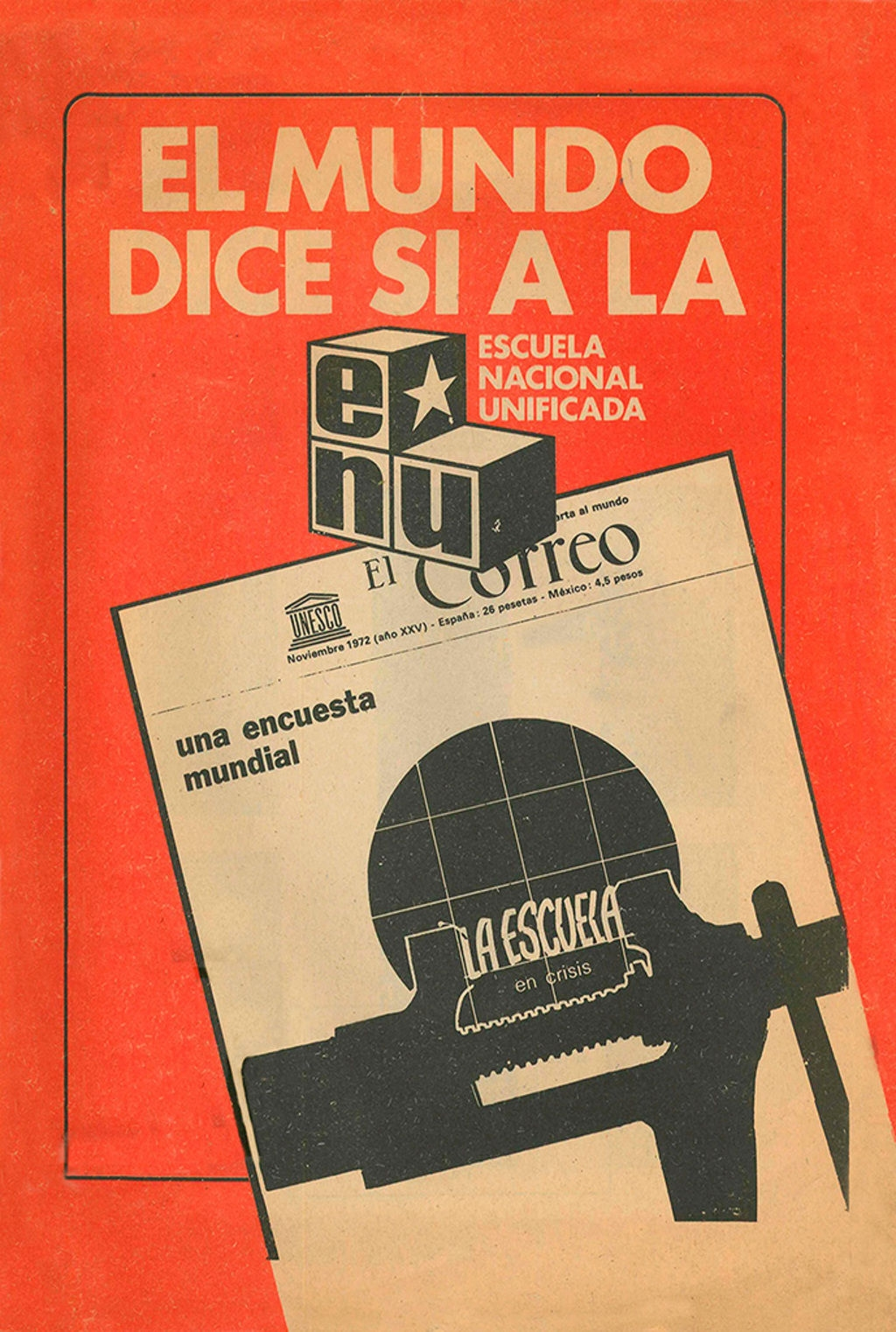
Pamphlet El mundo dice sí a la Escuela Nacional Unificada (1973).

The National Unified School (ENU) was a proposed reform of the educational system of Chile. It was one of the principal emblems of the government of Salvador Allende and Popular Unity from 1971 onward. After reflections that included various actors such as teachers, students, parents, and social organizations, it was concluded that education should be permanent (from the preschool level and throughout life), democratic, participatory, pluralist, and in keeping with the country's economic needs.

The bill and ministerial decrees of the ENU proposed a profound reform of the Chilean education system, with the objective of structuring education according to egalitarian and equitable criteria.

The concept of "National Unified School" arises from the concept of the unified school, established in the Constitution of the Second Spanish Republic of 1931, which in turn derived from the French ecole unique or the German Einheitsschule, and proposed unity in the educational system, far removed from the existing hierarchizations between levels.

==== Characteristics of the reform ====
The ENU specifically meant the integration and consolidation, in a single type of establishment (School Units or Educational Complexes), of preschool, primary, and secondary education, identified respectively as Preschool Education, General Education, and Polytechnic Education. This latter modality would have important differentiating features in its 4 years. Administration would be in the hands of councils made up of the establishment's management, teachers, auxiliary or para-teaching staff, and guardians.

The Sindicato Único de Trabajadores de la Educación, which was the trade-union body of the national teaching profession (both in its Constituent Assembly, held in July 1970, and in the First National Congress, held from 13 to 16 December 1971), indicated the need for a reform, especially within the policies of social transformation being promoted by the recently elected Popular Unity government.

In 1971, a National Congress of Education was convened by the Unified Workers' Centre (CUT) and the Ministry of Education, with delegates from the ministry, the Superintendencia de Educación Pública and its Council, the teaching profession, trade unions, private schools, students, and guardians.

The Congress broadly approved the idea of reforming education, but there was no agreement on the final text of a law. Emphasis was placed on the idea that, independently of the decisions and recommendations, these had to be aligned with the program of transformations being carried out at the state level by Popular Unity. An attempt was also made to strengthen the mechanisms of state control over private education, so that it would adhere to central school planning policies and curricular guidelines. The central goal was the creation of a "socialist, humanitarian society".

In January 1973, the Report on the National Unified School was published by the Superintendency of Public Education of the Ministry of Education, and by Revista de Educación in February 1973, beginning the public discussion about its scope and contents. According to the aforementioned document, the project of the National Unified School (ENU) aligned with the construction of a humanist socialist society under the following objectives:

- Development of the productive forces
- Overcoming economic, technological and cultural dependence
- Establishment of new property relations
- Development of a genuine democracy and social justice guaranteed through the exercise of people's power

This system would offer educational services to the population regardless of age, since "in all phases of individual development there are needs that can and must be satisfied through education", according to the report, under the principle of permanent education. According to the Report on the National Unified School, the ENU would have the following ten characteristics:

1. National in character
2. Unified
3. Diversified
4. Democratic, since it would be created and developed on the basis of community participation, would combat discrimination in access to and permanence in studies, and would be based on Chile’s democratic traditions
5. Pluralist
6. Productive, because it would contribute to eliminating consumerist and individualistic mentalities and to developing a productive and solidaristic outlook
7. Integrated with the community
8. Scientific and technological, considering the importance of the natural sciences and social sciences and technology, prioritizing them in the curriculum
9. Humanist
10. Planned

The publishing house Editora Nacional Quimantú, a project dependent on the government of Salvador Allende, carried out a diagnosis of the Chilean education system a few months before the 1973 Chilean coup d'état, concluding that Chile was experiencing an educational crisis. According to the publisher, the reasons regarding the education system were the following:

1. Anti-democratic in character. Of every 1,000 children of workers entering primary education, only three entered higher education.
2. Unequal in opportunities. Although nearly one million students entered the education system between 1970 and 1973, the vast majority did not complete their studies.
3. Excessively theoretical, where technical education was considered subordinate.
4. Not aligned with productive needs to overcome underdevelopment.
5. Tending toward imbalance in the absorption of graduating professionals.
6. Rigid, as it made reintegration into the system difficult.
7. Conservative, as it did not incorporate scientific-technological advances or the training needs of workers and professionals.
8. Compartmentalized, where subsystems lacked a backbone that articulated them.
9. Individualistic, promoting competitiveness among students through grades based on individual rather than group performance.
10. Authoritarian in educational governance, since communities did not participate.

==== Criticism ====
The project generated resistance among opponents of Salvador Allende's government, as it was suspected that behind it lay the purpose of installing an ideologically socialist type of education.

The proposals generated great polarization and protest and support mobilizations in various organizations, as occurred with student groups gathered in the Federation of Secondary Students of Santiago (FESES). The Catholic Church also, which had an important role in education in Chile, while valuing advances in the integration of the masses into the educational system, requested the postponement of the ENU.

3.- No matter how pluralist the report proclaims itself to be, we do not see highlighted anywhere the human and Christian values that form part of Chile's spiritual heritage.

— Declaration of the Permanent Committee of the Chilean Episcopate on the National Unified School, 27 March 1973.

The opposition parties—grouped in the Confederation of Democracy (CODE)—described the reform as an imminent "brainwashing" of schoolchildren.

Decree 224, promulgated on 6 March 1973 and establishing the creation on an experimental basis of the Education Councils, was repealed after the coup d'etat of 11 September 1973 by Decree 1264 promulgated on 27 September of the same month.

== Failed plebiscite ==
Allende planned to call a plebiscite regarding his continuation in office as President of the Republic. According to one of his personal advisers, the lawyer Joan Garcés, who had been with the president the previous day, slept at the Tomás Moro presidential residence and accompanied him to the La Moneda Palace on the day of the coup d'état, the referendum was to be announced on 11 September 1973 in a speech at the Technical State University, today the University of Santiago, Chile. He also intended to announce a package of emergency economic measures aimed at sustaining his government into 1974.

The plebiscite would have asked Chileans about his mandate, and the president would have resigned if the result had been negative. If the plebiscite result had favored Allende remaining in office, it presumably would have reduced the likelihood of a coup d'état. If the result had been adverse to Allende, he would have stepped down with dignity for leaving office by the decision of the citizenry rather than under opposition pressure.

Gonzalo Vial Correa considers that Allende did indeed intend to call a plebiscite. According to this author, the president’s problem lay with the parties of Popular Unity, which would not have accepted the idea of a plebiscite. The Socialist Party argued that it “would be a renunciation of the achievements attained”; a faction of MAPU and the Christian Left within the committee supported the socialist position, and the MIR was so outraged by the proposal that its members stopped calling him compañero, referring to him thereafter as señor.

== Foreign interference and relations ==
=== Argentina ===
Allende received the 1973 election of Héctor Cámpora, who had previously lived in exile in Chile, as good news. Allende sent in Aniceto Rodríguez to Buenos Aires to work on an alliance between the Socialist Party of Chile and the Justicialism. Later Allende assisted to the presidential inauguration of Cámpora. All of this was seen with good eyes by Juan Perón who came to refer to Allende as "compañero". However Perón also used Allende as a warning example for the most radical of his followers. In September just a few days before the 1973 Chilean coup d'etat he addressed the Tendencia Revolucionaria:

If you want to do as Allende, then look how it goes for Allende. One has to be calm.

— Juan Perón

Perón condemned the 1973 coup as a "fatality for the continent" stating that the coup leader Augusto Pinochet represented interests "well known" to him. He praised Allende for his "valiant attitude" of committing suicide. He took note of the role of the United States in instigating the coup by recalling his familiarity with coup-making processes.

=== Cuba ===
The state visit of Fidel Castro to Chile in 1971 was a landmark event both for Chilean internal politics and for the foreign relations of Cuba. Castro's visit occurred as Chile was experiencing political convulsion amidst the presidency of Allende. For Cuba it was the first state visit of Fidel Castro since he visited Moscow in 1964 and served to break the diplomatic isolation the country was subject to in Latin America. The state visit was unprecedented as Castro stayed 23 days in the country, travelling it from north to south, and commenting on Chilean politics. Upon arrival to each town and city Castro was usually met by crowds of supporters. His visit ended up making Allende uncomfortable while the Chilean right-wing exploited it to discredit the Unidad Popular government.

=== Soviet Union ===
Salvador Allende's predecessor, President Frei, improved relations with the USSR. In February 1970, President Frei's government signed Chile's first cultural and scientific agreement with the Soviet Union.

Allende's Popular Unity government tried to maintain normal relations with the United States, but when Chile nationalized its copper industry, Washington cut off U.S. credits and increased its support to opposition.

According to the former KGB agent, Vasili Mitrokhin, the Soviet Union provided financial support for the election of Salvador Allende, with whom it had had ties since the 1950s, by granting him a "personal subsidy of $500,000," which was approved by the Politburo with the aim of "strengthening confidential relations." It is also reported that $18,000 was paid to a left-wing senator to "persuade him not to run as a candidate." Once elected, the USSR provided $30,000 in October 1971 to "consolidate relations of trust" with the Allende government and another $50,000 requested in February 1973, shortly before the 1973 Chilean parliamentary election. The documents also claim that the Soviet intelligence service sought closer cooperation between Chilean intelligence agencies and the Soviet Union, including a possible reorganization of the Chilean Army and intelligence services, proposals to which Allende allegedly reacted positively. The KGB reportedly viewed the Popular Unity government's situation as increasingly difficult by 1972 and criticized Allende for not using "force" against his opponents. After the 1973 Chilean coup d'état, Soviet intelligence officials reportedly complained that Allende had given little importance to their warnings about the possibility of his overthrow.

Forced to seek alternative sources of trade and finance, Chile obtained commitments from the Soviet Union to invest about $400 million in Chile over the following six years. Despite this, Allende's government was disappointed to have received much less economic assistance from the Soviet Union than it had expected. Trade between the two countries did not increase significantly, and the credits were mainly tied to the purchase of Soviet equipment. In addition, USSR credits were much smaller than those provided by China and the countries of Eastern Europe. When Allende visited the Soviet Union at the end of 1972 in search of further aid and additional lines of credit, he was turned down.

Statements by KGB General Nikolai Leonov, former deputy chief of the First Chief Directorate of the KGB State Security Committee, state that the Soviet Union supported Allende's government economically, politically and militarily. Leonov stated in an interview at the Centro de Estudios Públicos (CEP) that Soviet economic support included more than $100 million in credit, three fishing vessels (which distributed 17,000 tons of frozen fish to the population), factories (as aid after the 1971 Illapel earthquake), 3,100 tractors, 74,000 tons of wheat and more than one million tins of condensed milk. Historian Christopher Andrew states, based on the handwritten notes of alleged KGB archivist Vasili Mitrokhin, that Allende was connected to the KGB.

In mid-1973, the USSR had approved the delivery of weapons (artillery, tanks) to the Chilean Army. However, when news of an attempt from the Army to depose Allende through a coup d'état reached Soviet officials, the shipment was redirected to another country.

=== United States opposition to Allende ===
The United States opposition to Allende started several years before he was elected President of Chile. Declassified documents show that from 1962 through 1964, the CIA spent $3 million in anti-Allende propaganda "to scare voters away from Allende's FRAP coalition", and spent a total of $2.6 million to finance the presidential campaign of Eduardo Frei.

U.S. President Richard Nixon, then embroiled in the Vietnam War and Cold War with the Soviet Union, was openly hostile to the possibility of a second socialist regime (after Cuba) in the Western Hemisphere. There was clandestine support by the U.S. government to prevent Allende from taking office after election: On 16 October 1970, a formal instruction was issued to the CIA base in Chile, saying in part, "It is firm and continuing policy that Allende be overthrown by a coup. It would be much preferable to have this transpire prior to 24 October, but efforts in this regard will continue vigorously beyond this date. We are to continue to generate maximum pressure toward this end, utilizing every appropriate resource. It is imperative that these actions be implemented clandestinely and securely so that the USG and American hand be well hidden".

Regarding the botched attempted-kidnapping and manslaughter of Chilean Army Commander René Schneider on 22 October 1970 (Schneider was a constitutionalist opposed to the idea of a coup preventing Allende from taking office or removing him after the fact), the Church Committee observed: "The CIA attempted, directly, to foment a military coup in Chile. It passed three weapons to a group of Chilean officers who plotted a coup. Beginning with the kidnapping of Chilean Army Commander-in-Chief Rene Schneider. However, those guns were returned. The group which staged the abortive kidnap of Schneider, which resulted in his death, apparently was not the same as the group which received CIA weapons." However, the group which killed Schneider had previously been in contact with the CIA. The agency later paid that group $35,000, according to the Hinchey report, "in an effort to keep the prior contact secret, maintain the good will of the group, and for humanitarian reasons". CIA documents indicate that while the CIA had sought his kidnapping, his killing was never intended. Public outrage over the killing of Schneider cooled sentiments for a coup, and neither the U.S. nor Chilean military attempted other removal actions in the early years of the Allende administration. On 26 October, President Eduardo Frei Montalva (Salvador Allende was inaugurated 3 November) named General Carlos Prats as commander in chief of the army in replacement of René Schneider. Carlos Prats was also a constitutionalist.

With Allende in office, the United States reduced economic aid to the Chilean government.

In 1973, the CIA was notified by contacts of the impending Pinochet coup two days in advance, but contends it "played no direct role" in the coup. After Pinochet assumed power, U.S. Secretary of State Henry Kissinger told Nixon that the United States "didn't do it" (referring to the coup itself) but had "created the conditions as great [sic] as possible".

== Crisis ==
In October 1972, Chile saw the first of what were to be a wave of confrontational strikes led by some of the historically well-off sectors of Chilean society; these received the open support of United States President Richard Nixon. A strike by trucking company owners, which the CIA supported by funding them with US$2 million within the frame of the "September Plan", began on 9 October 1972. The strike was declared by the Confederación Nacional del Transporte, then presided by León Vilarín, one of the leaders of the far-right paramilitary group Fatherland and Liberty. The Confederation, which brought together 165 trucking company business associations, employing 40,000 drivers and 56,000 vehicles, decreed an indefinite strike, paralyzing the country.

It was soon joined by the small businessmen, some (mostly professional) unions, and some student groups. Its leaders (Vilarín, Jaime Guzmán, Rafael Cumsille, Guillermo Elton and Eduardo Arriagada) expected to topple the government through the strike. Other than the inevitable damage to the economy, the chief effect of the 24-day strike was to bring the head of the army, general Carlos Prats, into the government as Interior Minister, as a sign of appeasement. Carlos Prats had succeeded General René Schneider after his assassination on 24 October 1970, by two groups, General Roberto Viaux and General Camilo Valenzuela, who had benefitted from logistical and financial support from the CIA. Prats was a supporter of the legalist Schneider doctrine and refused to involve the military in a coup against Allende.

In March and July 1972, Allende and the Christian Democrats tried to forge a compromise. The moderate Party of the Radical Left, representing the UP coalition in March, held talks with the Christian Democratic Party over regulations of nationalized firms, but ultimately failed, as the minister of economy Pedro Vuskovic boycotted the negotiations and carried out legally dubious expropriations. As a result, the Radical Left also left the UP coalition, hence the coalition lost 5 senators and 7 deputies. In July, the resumed talks were almost going to succeed, until the more conservative elements within the Christian Democrat party managed to break off the negotiations. From that point on, the political life of the country was highly polarized between two opposing camps: the governing left-wing Unidad Popular and the right-wing opposition of Christian Democrats who were allied with the National Party, a vehemently right-wing opposition party.

=== Congressional resolutions ===
On 22 August 1973, the Christian Democrats and the National Party members of the Chamber of Deputies voted 81 to 47, a resolution that asked the authorities, in reference to "The President of the Republic, Ministers of State, and members of the Armed and Police Forces", to "put an immediate end" to "breach[es of] the Constitution...with the goal of redirecting government activity toward the path of Law and ensuring the Constitutional order of our Nation, and the essential underpinnings of democratic co-existence among Chileans". The resolution declared that the Allende Government sought "to conquer absolute power with the obvious purpose of subjecting all citizens to the strictest political and economic control by the state ... [with] the goal of establishing a totalitarian system", claiming it had made "violations of the Constitution...a permanent system of conduct". Finally, the resolution condemned the "creation and development of government-protected [socialist] armed groups, which ... are headed towards a confrontation with the armed forces". President Allende's efforts to re-organize the military and the police forces were characterised as "notorious attempts to use the armed and police forces for partisan ends, destroy their institutional hierarchy, and politically infiltrate their ranks".

Most of the accusations were about the Socialist Government disregarding the separation of powers, and arrogating legislative and judicial prerogatives to the executive branch of government. The resolution was later used by Pinochet a way to justify the coup, which occurred two weeks later. On 24 August 1973, Allende responded point-by point to the accusations. He accused the opposition of trying to incite a military coup by encouraging the armed forces to disobey civilian authorities. He said that Congress was "facilitat[ing] the seditious intention of certain sectors" and promoting a coup or a civil war by "invoking the intervention of the Armed Forces and of Order against a democratically elected government". He observed that the declaration had failed to obtain the required two-thirds majority constitutionally required to bring an accusation against the president and argued that the legislature was trying to usurp the executive role. He wrote that "Chilean democracy is a conquest by all of the people. It is neither the work nor the gift of the exploiting classes, and it will be defended by those who, with sacrifices accumulated over generations, have imposed it...With a tranquil conscience ... I sustain that never before has Chile had a more democratic government than that over which I have the honor to preside". He concluded by calling upon "the workers, all democrats and patriots" to join him in defense of the constitution and of the "revolutionary process".

== Position of the Armed Forces and Police ==
During the years prior to Allende's assumption of office, the thinking of the Armed Forces had been significantly influenced by the National security doctrine, a body of ideas from the field of military studies promoted by the United States that sought to unify the doctrine of the American continent during the Cold War. At the same time, the Army in particular possessed a strong anti-communist tradition that led to friction with the Popular Unity government. This tendency of the Armed Forces, however, can be traced to before Allende's government. Both the mass resignation of around 80 officers from the War Academy of the Chilean Army in 1968 and the Tacnazo of 1969 during the government of Eduardo Frei Montalva are examples of this situation.

Events during Allende's government revealed the existence of two positions within the Chilean Armed Forces. The first was the constitutionalist stance, also known as the "Schneider Doctrine", and the second was the coup-supporting position. Regarding the latter, members of the Army and the Navy, both active and retired, maintained close contacts with the organization Nationalist Front "Fatherland and Liberty", formed in 1971. Former general Roberto Viaux participated in the first public event of this organization, where he was honored. In the same line of collaboration, paramilitary and self-defense training of Patria y Libertad militants was in many cases carried out by former Armed Forces officers.

The policy pursued by the Popular Unity government toward the Armed Forces sought to guarantee them appropriate levels of equipment as well as a system of remunerations, promotions and pensions that would ensure "for officers, non-commissioned officers, enlisted personnel and troops economic security during their service and retirement and an effective possibility for all to advance based solely on personal merit". However, these measures were unable to counter the preexisting politicization within them. At the same time, the lack of a coherent political line directed toward the Armed Forces by the Popular Unity government stemmed from an overestimation of their professional and "apolitical" character. This assessment is reflected in the presidential message of 21 May 1971, where Salvador Allende stated:

The skeptics and the catastrophists will say that it is not possible. They will say that a Parliament that served the dominant classes so well is incapable of transforming itself. Even more, they have emphatically said that the Armed Forces and Carabineros, until now the support of the institutional order that we will surpass, would not accept guaranteeing the popular will determined to build socialism in our country. They forget the patriotic consciousness of our Armed Forces and Carabineros, their professional tradition and their submission to civilian power... I affirm that the Chilean Armed Forces and the Carabineros Corps, remaining faithful to their duty and to their tradition of not interfering in political problems, will support a social order that corresponds to the popular will expressed under the terms established by the Constitution.

=== The Navy ===
In the case of the Navy, the Cofradía Náutica del Pacífico Austral, a secret society formed in 1968, was one of the principal organizations where the 1973 coup d'état was planned. As part of the brotherhood, high-ranking naval officers such as José Toribio Merino, Patricio Carvajal and José Radic Pardo met periodically along with civilians such as Agustín Edwards Eastman, Roberto Kelly and Fernando Léniz. In 1972, Army general Sergio Arellano Stark and Carabineros general Arturo Yovane joined. While the coup was being planned, and beginning in 1972, Navy officers began circulating pro-coup proclamations aboard ships and sounding out the positions of their subordinates regarding Allende's government.

As part of the coup planning by Navy officers, this sector maintained close links with anti-communist political organizations. In 1972, naval officers met with Roberto Thieme, one of the principal leaders of Patria y Libertad, asking that his organization contribute by blowing up railways, pipelines and highways at specific points so that the truckers' strike would not collapse. The Navy itself would indicate the targets and provide explosives. That same year, a Patria y Libertad commando carried out a failed attempt to plant an explosive bomb at the home of Admiral Ismael Huerta, who was suspected of constitutionalist sympathies. Another version claims it was in fact a false-flag attack. As in the previous case, this commando was operationally linked to the Navy. Finally, it is presumed that the murder of Salvador Allende's naval aide-de-camp, Arturo Araya Peeters, was carried out by the Navy itself, since his legalist loyalty to the president might have led him to reveal the coup plans prematurely. Members of Patria y Libertad, according to statements by Roberto Thieme, and members of the Rolando Matus Command of the National Party were also implicated. These actions aimed to weaken perceptions of support for Allende's government and undermine its governability while creating an atmosphere of chaos and disorder to facilitate the coup of 11 September.

On the other hand, in mid-1973 groups of sailors and workers organized in the schools, ships and bases of Valparaíso and Talcahuano to transmit information about coup plans among officers to the authorities of Allende's government and to several left-wing political parties of the time. Representatives of these groups of enlisted sailors met with Carlos Altamirano (PS) and political leaders Óscar Garretón (MAPU) and Miguel Enríquez (MIR) to inform them of the situation and establish lines of action. According to some of the non-commissioned officers who participated in a meeting with Altamirano, their intention was to provoke a mutiny by confining the officers and taking control of the main ships in support of Allende's government to prevent the coup. As a result of this situation, the military prosecutor ordered the arrest of between 200 and 300 crew members, school personnel and civilians between July and August 1973 on charges of subversion and sedition in the Navy. The Almirante Silva Palma Barracks, the War Academy, the Marine Infantry Detachment Fuerte Silva Borgoño and an improvised detention camp in Colliguay were used to interrogate and torture the sailors involved. Eighty-three sailors were sentenced to between two and five years in prison for attempted sedition under the Military Justice Code. The public denunciation was made in August 1973 in a letter signed by 33 tortured sailors titled Carta de los marineros torturados a Salvador Allende y a los trabajadores de Chile.

After serving their sentences in prison or being granted amnesty under the Amnesty Law issued by Augusto Pinochet in 1978, most left Chile, except sailor Ernesto Zúñiga Vergara and former corporal Alberto Salazar Briceño, who later joined the ranks of the MIR during the dictatorship. While the sailors were being detained, and in preparation for the coup, the Navy launched "Plan Cochayuyo" to place the Marine Infantry in barracks and move troops in preparation for the coup without attracting attention from Popular Unity party forces.

=== The Air Force ===
Within the Chilean Air Force (FACH), the so-called "Defense Plan 1-73" was developed in August 1973 for the air base of Cerrillos along with the creation of the Anti-Insurgency Company. In the first case, it envisaged a response to a possible “subversive action by the industrial belts of the area”. Likewise, the first of the operations directed at executing the coup, "Operation Silence", was entrusted to the FACH director of communications Francisco Herrera Latoja together with representatives of the Navy and the Army, and its objective was to silence radio stations supportive of the Popular Unity government and Salvador Allende on the day the coup was carried out.

According to the testimony of then Air Force captain Jorge Silva Ortiz, a plan existed within the FACH to assassinate Salvador Allende before he assumed office.

=== The Army ===
In August 1972 various reports sent by the Central Intelligence Agency station in Santiago, Chile described meetings held between business and military sectors. Among the military figures contacted by the National Front of the Private Sector (FRENAP) was Alfredo Canales, director of training of the Chilean Army. In response to a request by Moisés Guzmán, president of FRENAP, to maintain coordination that “did not depend on political parties”, Canales asked “what the business sector was capable of doing for the military”. The conspiracy led by Canales was discovered and dismantled by the army high command in September 1972 after he mentioned his intentions to a group of admirals at a social gathering.

Another conspiratorial episode involving members of the army against Allende's government occurred on 29 June 1973. On that day Colonel Roberto Souper Onfray of the Armored Battalion No. 2 led the so-called Tanquetazo, the rehearsal for the coup of 11 September. During the uprising, a column of 16 military vehicles and around one hundred soldiers surrounded the La Moneda Palace and the Ministry of Defense and opened fire on the buildings, leaving 22 dead and 32 wounded by gunfire.

On 21 August a demonstration of generals’ wives began in front of the house of Prats, joined by several officers in civilian clothes protesting against him. He was insulted and stoned, and when Carabineros dispersed the demonstration it quickly reorganized.

On 22 August the Chamber of Deputies approved the Agreement on the grave breach of the constitutional and legal order of the Republic, in which it accused the government of various violations such as applying measures of economic and political control to later establish a totalitarian system, violating constitutional guarantees, conducting a campaign of defamation against the Supreme Court, violating freedom of expression, repressing opponents with violence and attempting to politically infiltrate the Armed Forces.

Navy officers met with Altamirano to warn him of coup attempts, after which they were prosecuted by the Navy. Altamirano delivered a speech defending his right to receive information from anyone who denounced conspiracies: “If I could, I would speak with them again [...] If a coup is attempted, Chile will be a second heroic Vietnam".

=== Final coup ===
In early September 1973, Allende floated the idea of resolving the crisis with a referendum. However, the Chilean military seized the initiative of the Chamber of Deputies' 22 August Resolution (which had implored Allende's military removal) to oust Allende on 11 September 1973. As the Presidential Palace was surrounded and bombed, Allende died by suicide.

== See also ==
- Vuskovic plan – UP's economic policy
- Chilean nationalization of copper
- Death of Salvador Allende – controversy regarding his death
- Project Cybersyn
- Allendism – ideologies based on Allende's government
