= Vuskovic Plan =

Chilean Economic Program 1970–1973

The Vuskovic Plan was the basis for the economic policy of the Popular Unity (UP) government of Chilean President Salvador Allende. It was drafted by and named after his first Economics Minister Pedro Vuskovic, who had worked before with the CEPAL. Although good results were obtained in 1970, following massive levels of United States intervention in Chile, hyperinflation made a comeback in 1972. By 1973 inflation was still soaring, the country had no foreign reserves, and GDP was falling.

== Background ==
The overall stated objective of Allende's Popular Unity government was to achieve a transition to socialism by democratic means. This would involve a combined political and economic program aimed at wresting control of the economy out of the hands of business owners and placing it in the hands of the state. It would then be easier to dismantle the various institutions connected with Western capitalism. The key figure in the economic policy of Salvador Allende’s UP government was the first Minister of the Economy, Pedro Vuskovic. In accordance with Keynesian economics, he wanted to implement a massive redistribution of revenue by raising salaries and increasing public expenditure, through which the buying power of the population would increase and accordingly consumption in general. These measures would activate the idle capacity of the Chilean productive apparatus (which was relatively large) and generate a climate of prosperity. If this strategy paid off, it would have had the effect of strengthening the government’s position and allowing it to advance its revolutionary program much faster.

The macroeconomic program was based on several key assumptions, the most important being that the manufacturing sector had ample underutilized capacity. The lack of full utilization was, in turn, attributed to two fundamental factors: the monopolistic nature of the manufacturing industry and the structure of income distribution. Based on this diagnosis, influenced by Keynesian ideas of support to aggregate demand, it was thought that if income were redistributed toward the poorer groups through wage increases and if prices were properly controlled, there would be a significant expansion of demand and output. This provided the theoretical basis for the belief that large fiscal deficits would not necessarily be inflationary. Regarding inflation, the UP program placed blame on structural rigidities (namely, slow or no response of quantity supplied to price increases), bottlenecks, and the role of monopolistic pricing, and it played down the role of fiscal pressures and money creation.

== Application ==
The plan considered the following economic measures as necessary:

- Nationalization of the country’s basic resources.
- Nationalization of large foreign enterprises, which were seen to be draining the wealth out of the country.
- Agrarian reform: the breaking-up of the latifundios (large landed estates) and redistribution of land to the peasants.
- Transferring banks and large businesses into state property in order to obtain control over internal credit and income.
- A massive redistribution of income. These measures were seen as a first phase and, in theory, would form the basis of a popular-social movement. Having gained the popular support of the masses, the government would then be in a position to make a successful transition to a socialist society.

Little attention was paid to the financial sector, given the orientation of the new regime's economic technocrats toward the import substitution, structuralist philosophy of the CEPAL (United Nations Economic Commission for Latin America and the Caribbean). In fact, Allende's Minister of Foreign Affairs and Vice President, Clodomiro Almeyda, relates in his memoirs how in the first postelection meeting of the economic team, these technocrats argued expressly and convincingly that monetary and financial management did not deserve too much attention. Alfonso Inostroza, the Central Bank president, stated in early 1971 that the main objective of the monetary policy was to "transform it into a key instrument . . . to achieve the complete mobilization of productive resources, and their allocation to those areas that the government gives priority to . . . ." This was consistent with the view of inflation of those espousing structuralism.

US President Richard Nixon had made it known that he wanted to "make the (Chilean) economy scream" and this policy was outlined in National Security Decision Memorandum (NSDM) 93 of November 1970: "no new bilateral economic aid commitments be undertaken with the Government of Chile (programs of a humanitarian or private social agency character will be considered on a case by case basis); existing commitments will be fulfilled but ways in which, if the U. S. desires to do so, they could be reduced, delayed or terminated should be examined... bring maximum feasible influence to bear in international financial institutions to limit credit or other financing assistance to Chile. To the extent possible, financial assistance or guarantees to US private investment in Chile would be ended, and US businesses would be made aware of the government's concern and its restrictive policies…"

== Results ==
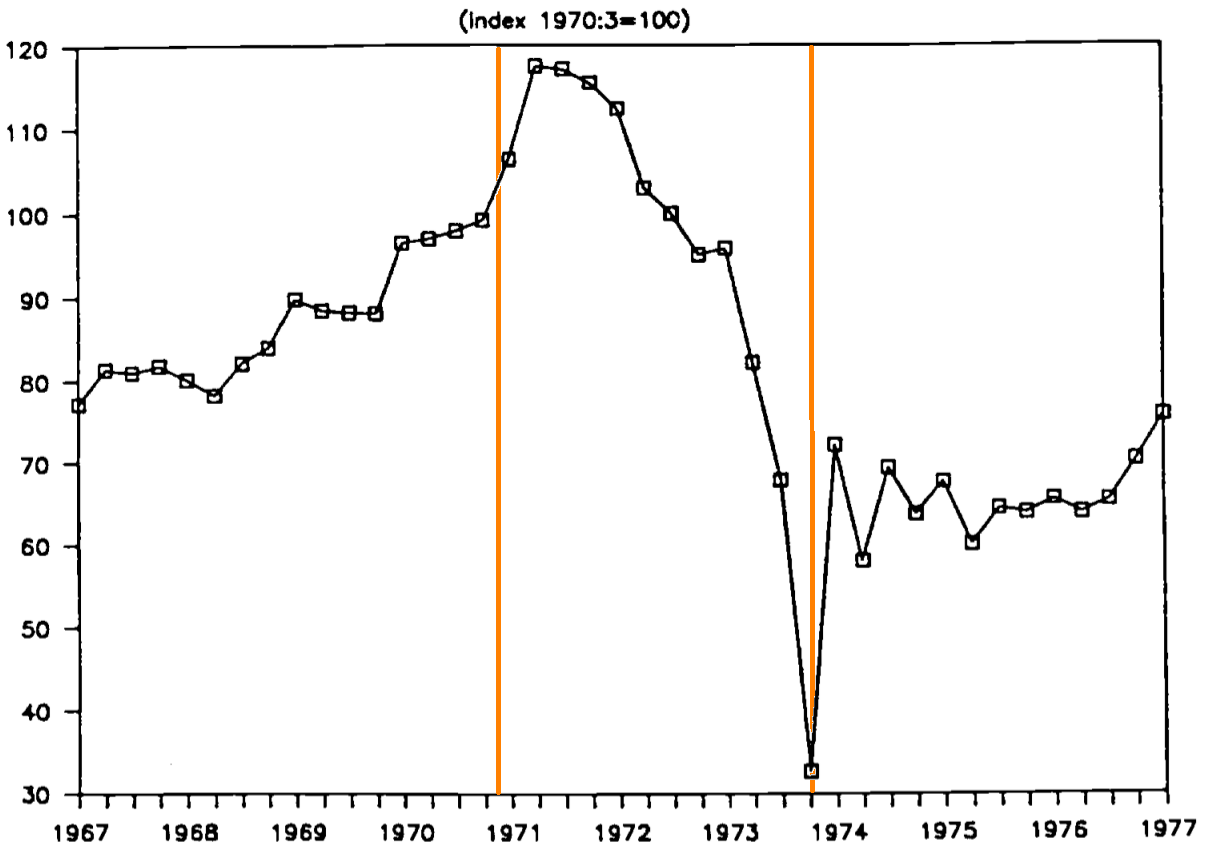
Chile real wages between 1967 and 1977. Orange lines mark the beginning and end of Allende's presidency.

The first year saw 12% industrial growth and an 8.6% increase in GDP, accompanied by major declines in inflation (down from 34.9% to 22.1%) and unemployment (down to 3.8%). In addition to the rise in employment, Allende also raised wages on a number of occasions throughout 1970 and 1971. These rises in wages were negated by continuing increases in prices for food. Although price rises had also been high under president Eduardo Frei Montalva (27% a year between 1967 and 1970), a basic basket of consumer goods rose by 120% from 190 to 421 escudos in one month alone, August 1972. In the period 1970–72, while Allende was in government, exports fell 24% and imports rose 26%, with imports of food rising an estimated 149%.

However, these results were not sustainable. The price of copper took a nose-dive and production also went down, with correspondingly negative results for the economy. A commercial deficit was recorded at the end of 1971 and private investors shied away. In 1972, the Chilean economy took a turn for the worse. Exports fell, imports rose alarmingly and inflation rocketed. The falls in exports were mostly due to a fall in the price of copper, since Chile was at the mercy of international fluctuations in the value of its single most important export. As with almost half of developing countries, more than 50 per cent of Chile's export receipts were from a single primary commodity. Adverse fluctuation in the international price of copper negatively affected the Chilean economy throughout 1971–72. The price of copper fell from a peak of $66 per ton in 1970 to only $48–9 in 1971 and 1972.

In 1972 the escudo had runaway inflation of 140%. From December 1972 to December 1973, the inflation rate was a catastrophic 508% – an example of hyperinflation. The average Real GDP contracted between 1971 and 1973 at an annual rate of 5.6% ("negative growth"), and the government's fiscal deficit soared while foreign reserves declined. Inflation led to the rise of black markets in rice, beans, sugar, and flour, and a "disappearance" of such basic commodities from supermarket shelves. The government attempted to prevent this shortage by creating juntas de Abastecimientos y Precios (JAP, literally "Committees of Supply and Prices"). These were local administrative units essentially functioning as rationing boards, designed to alleviate the chronic shortages.

In addition to the hyperinflation and the fall in the value of copper, the lack of economic aid further depressed the economy. The growth in GDP went from 9% in 1971 to −1.2% in 1972, while the rate of inflation went from 22.1% the previous year to 163.4%. Vuskovic was replaced as Minister of Economy on June 17, 1972, and the Allende government announced it would default on debts owed to international creditors and foreign governments. Allende also froze all prices while raising salaries, but the damage was already done. Chile had entered a major recession, with hyperinflation, a negative growth in GDP, a lack of supplies and spare parts, as well as a state of general political and social disorder. His implementation of these policies led to strong opposition by landowners, some middle-class sectors, the rightist National Party, the Roman Catholic Church (which was displeased with the direction of the educational policy), and eventually the Christian Democrats. By September 1973, inflation had reached 381.1% and the growth in GDP stood at −4.2%. Vuskovic plan's policies were used by economists Rudi Dornbusch and Sebastian Edwards to coin the term macroeconomic populism.

Fidel Castro, though friendly to Allende's government, is said to have been critical of the approach epitomized by the Vuskovic plan. “Marxism," Castro is said to have stated, "is a revolution of production," whereas "Allende's was a revolution of consumption."

== See also ==
- Chile under Allende
- Economic history of Chile
- Chilean nationalization of copper
- Salvador Allende
- Miracle of Chile
- Project Cybersyn

== Bibliography ==
- Ankie Hoogvelt (1997). Globalisation and the postcolonial world, London: Macmillan.
- Alec Nove (1986). Socialism, Economics and Development, London: Allen & Unwin.
