= Allendism =

Political ideology

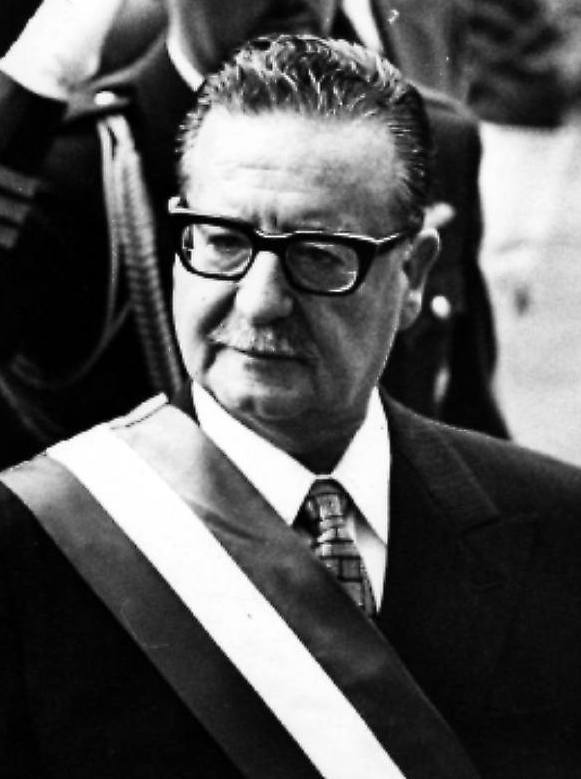
Salvador Allende with the presidential band.

Allendism (Spanish: Allendismo) is an ideological current that bases its positions and lines on the government of Salvador Allende, former president of Chile who, together with the Popular Unity (Unidad Popular, UP), ruled the country until the coup d'état of 1973, headed by Augusto Pinochet. Within the political spectrum, it is located between the left-wing, basing its principles on democratic socialism, institutionalism, and socialist humanism. The followers of this current are called allendistas.

== History ==
Within Allendism, there are mainly two theoretical-historical currents: one led by Salvador Allende himself and followed by the Communist and Radical Party, as well as the MAPU Obrero Campesino and the Independent Popular Action; while the other current, of a more radical nature, led by Carlos Altamirano, was followed by the Socialist Party, the MAPU, and the Christian Left.

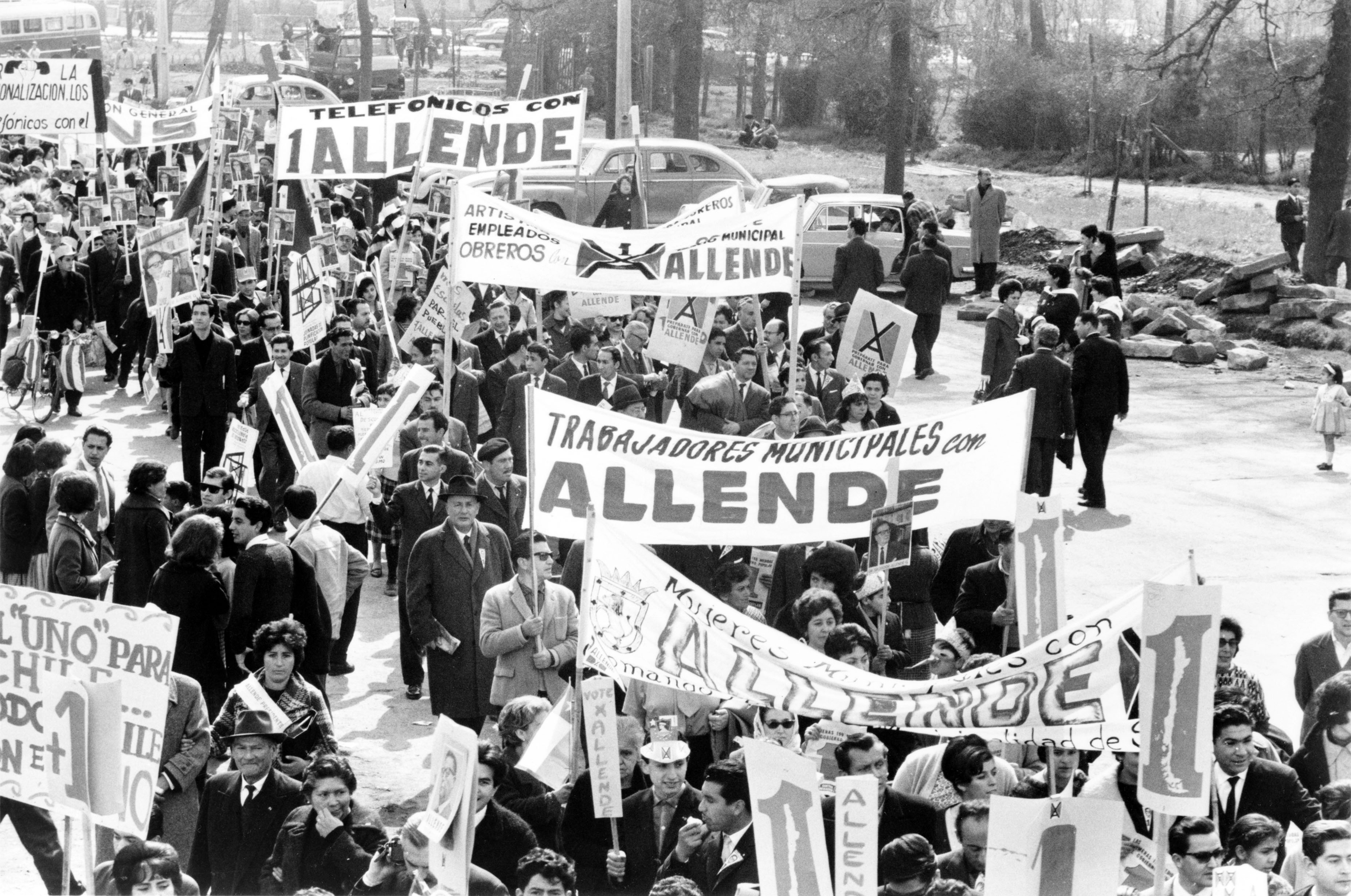
March of supporters of Allende, 1970

Allende's doctrine spoke of structurally reforming the country while at the same time trying to reach agreements with the Christian Democratic Party, the Confederation of Democracy, and the business sectors so as not to increase the internal and social tension that the country was experiencing. The Communist Party, which favored these measures, spoke of "moving forward by consolidating".

Altamirano's thinking, on the contrary, used the motto "move forward without compromising", with which it expressed the refusal to reach any agreements with the business sectors, the center, and the right during the government; it represented the most radical line within the Popular Unity coalition, since, at that time, these sectors viewed the electoral route with distrust. During the coup, Pinochet ordered the immediate assassination of Carlos Altamirano, considering him a possible factor in armed resistance.

After the so-called “socialist renewal”, in which the exiles of the UP in Europe embraced and internalized the institutional framework and social democracy as ideological bases, Allendism adopted a more institutional and conciliatory character concerning the reforms raised by the same current. Currently, experts define Allendism as a feeling of nostalgia for the Popular Unity period, without necessarily wanting to restore or retry the reforms made during that time.

After the Chilean transition to democracy, Allendism as a political ideology was welcomed by different left-wing political parties. On December 9, 1991, the leftist political coalition Movimiento de Izquierda Democrática Allendista was formed. It comprised the Communist Party, the Communist Party (Proletarian Action), MAPU, the Revolutionary Left Movement, and the Christian Left. It was directed by Pedro Vuskovic, former socialist militant and Minister of Economy during the government of Allende, and also included other left-wing personalities among its main figures, such as priest Rafael Maroto and deputy Mario Palestro.

It participated in the 1992 municipal elections, achieving the election of 35 councilors and the appointment of Jorge Soria as mayor of the commune of Iquique. In the 1993 presidential election, it supported the candidacy of priest Eugenio Pizarro and presented candidates for the National Congress in the parliamentary elections of that same year. In the latter, it participated under the Left Democratic Alternative, officially registered with the Electoral Service on July 14. The coalition formally dissolved on May 10, 1993.

On September 28, 2019, Jorge Arrate and Ernesto Águila founded the political party Socialist Platform. In its beginnings, it was a member of Apruebo Dignidad, and since February 2023, it has been from the Broad Front. The Movimiento del Socialismo Allendista emerged in 2021. Its main leader is Esteban Silva Cuadra, who left the Socialist Party. It was also a member of the Allendistas por Jadue commando, whose objective was to "ensure the victory" of the communist politician Daniel Jadue in the presidential primaries on July 18, and rescue Allende's legacy.

== See also ==
- Pinochetism
