= Pedro Vuskovic =

Chilean economist and political figure

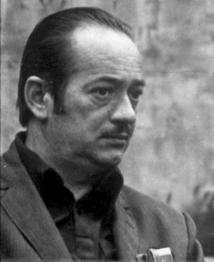
Pedro Vuskovic Bravo

Pedro Vuskovic Bravo (February 25, 1924 – May 10, 1993) was a Chilean economist of Croatian descent, political figure, minister and author of the economic plan implemented by Salvador Allende during his government called the Vuskovic plan. His economic policies were used by economists Rudi Dornbusch and Sebastian Edwards to coin the term macroeconomic populism.

== Life ==
Pedro Vuskovic was born in Antofagasta, and obtained a degree in business administration from the University of Chile. He became a professor of Statistics at the same university, while at the same time working for ECLAC (the United Nations Economic Commission for Latin America and the Caribbean), also known as CEPAL.

Vuskovic joined the ECLAC/FAO in 1950, shortly after its birth as an institution. For nearly 20 years he worked there, with his career in ECLAC culminating in the position of Director of the Development Division, where he played a role in structuring and disseminating the thinking of ECLAC. Concurrently, he served as a professor in ECLAC and ILPES training programmes while at the same time teaching classes at the schools of economics and sociology at the University of Chile and the School of Economics at the University of Concepción, finally becoming the Director of the Institute of Economics of the University of Chile.

He was the author of the economic platform of the Popular Unity (UP) campaign, and on November 3, 1970, he was named Minister of Economic Affairs by President Salvador Allende. He became the key figure in the economic policy of the UP government, and tried to implement a massive redistribution of revenue (Vuskovic plan) by raising salaries and increasing public expenditure, with the goal of increasing the purchasing power of the population, to increase and accordingly consumption in general.

The goal was also associated with the intent of expanding the domestic market, and therefore promoting import substitution via the increase of domestic demand for domestic industrial products, aggressively targetting domestic excess industrial capacity, such that profits would require expanding production (and the creation, and filling, of new capacity).

Issues with the long-term Chilean dependence on the export or primary commodities, copper accounting for 75-80% of foreign currency, and other minerals) (see Dutch disease) made the execution of this intent problematic, as the short-term large increase in domestic consumption (including by those who previously did not have the privilege to share in the existing consumption standards of society) largely contributed to increased imports reliant on continuous trade surplus via commodity export prices. Dollarization of the financial sector and US sanctions put a great strain on the economy's functioning.

Also, the large shortfall in agricultural production put a further strain on the real spending power of workers and increased the reliance on food imports.

He remained as a minister until June 17, 1972, when political pressure forced President Allende to halt his economic plans and replace him in the cabinet. Vuskovic then took over the cabinet-level position of Executive Vice President of the Production Development Corporation (CORFO), where he served until September 1973. After the Chilean Coup of 1973, he was exiled to Mexico.

There he became a professor, first at the Economic Research and Teaching Centre (CIDE), where he directed the Institute of Economic Studies of Latin America, and later at the Centre for Interdisciplinary Research in the Humanities at the National University of Mexico (UNAM), where he was named to the position of Coordinator for a programme on poverty and development options in various countries of Latin America.

After the return to democracy in 1990, he returned to Chile for a short while but moved back to Mexico where he lived his last years and died in 1993.

== Additional information ==
=== See also ===
- History of Chile
- Chile under Allende
- Chilean nationalization of copper
- Chilean nationalization of iron

=== Bibliography ===
- Vuskovic, Pedro; Acusación al imperialismo, Fondo de Cultura Económica, México D.F., 1975
- Vuskovic, Pedro. Los diagnósticos de la pobreza (in Spanish).
