= Tanzi =

Tanzi may refer to:

- Tanzi (surname), Italian surname
- Tanzi di Blevio, Italian aristocratic family
- Tanzi effect
- Tanzi, Taichung, district in Taiwan
- Trafford Tanzi, play by Clare Luckham
