= Death of Salvador Allende =

1973 suicide of Chilean president

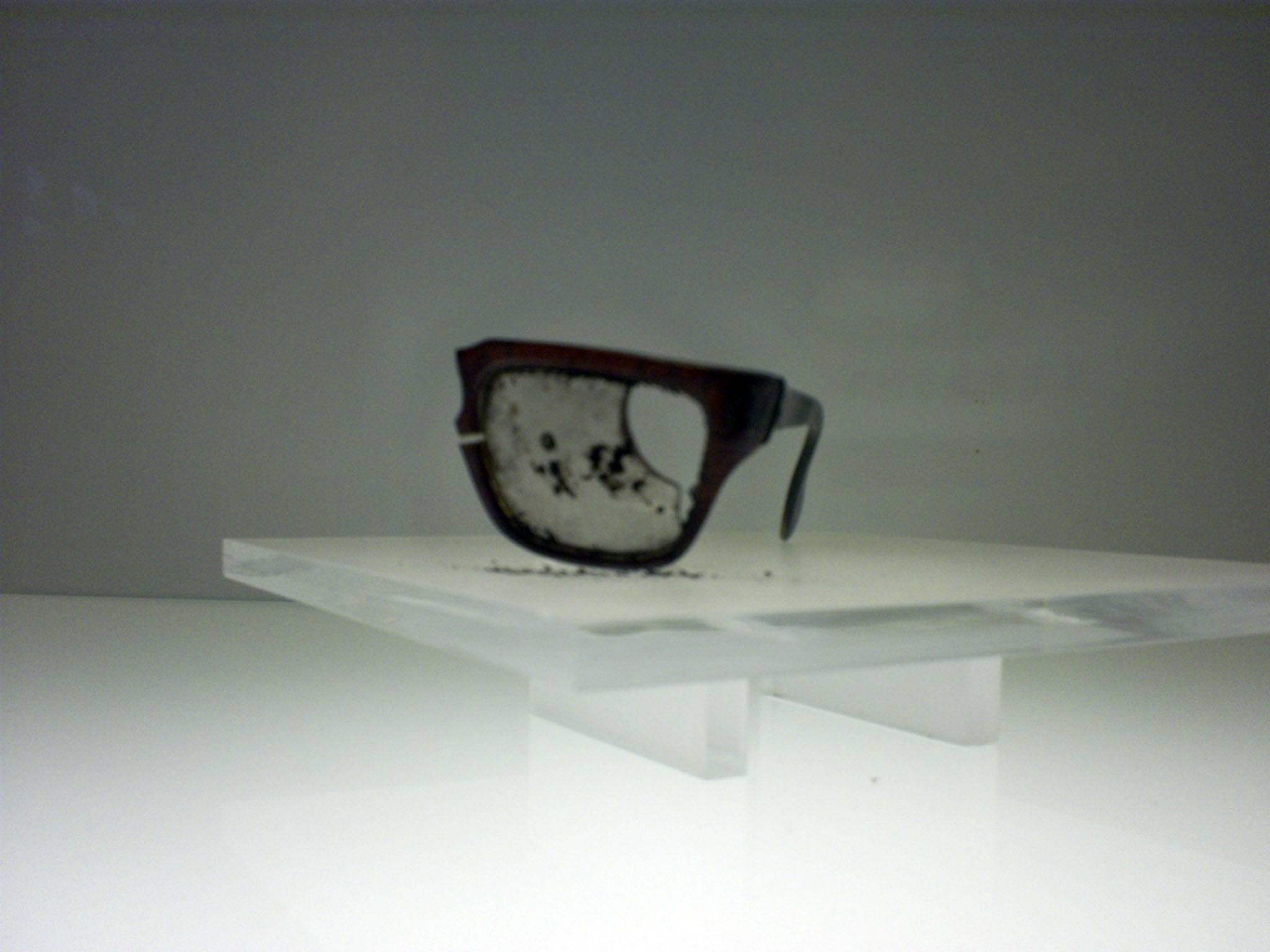
Allende's glasses, found in the Palacio de La Moneda after his death

On September 11, 1973, Salvador Allende, the president of Chile, died by suicide during a coup d'état led by General Augusto Pinochet, commander-in-chief of the Chilean Army. In 2011, after decades of suspicions that Allende might have been assassinated by the Chilean Armed Forces, a Chilean court authorized the exhumation and autopsy of Allende's remains, which confirmed that the wounds were self-inflicted.

Carlos Altamirano, who was close to Allende, recalls that prior to the coup, Allende had dismissed his suggestion to seek refuge in a loyalist regiment and fight back from there.Altamirano also said that Allende had rejected the option "to do as so many dictators and presidents of Latin America, that is to grab a briefcase full of money and take a plane out the country." Allende was an admirer of José Manuel Balmaceda, a Chilean president who died by suicide in face of his defeat in the Chilean Civil War of 1891. According to Altamirano, Allende was "obsessed with the attitude of Balmaceda."

In an interview with David Frost in 2013, Isabel Allende said that at a family lunch nine days before his death, Salvador Allende had said that he would either stay until the end of this term of presidency or he would be taken out feet first.

== Death ==
On September 11, 1973, just prior to the capture of Palacio de La Moneda (the presidential palace) by military units loyal to Pinochet, President Salvador Allende made his farewell speech to Chileans on live radio (Radio Magallanes). He spoke of his love for Chile and of his deep faith in its future. He also stated that, as he was committed to the country, he would not take an easy way out or be used as a propaganda tool by those he called "traitors" (accepting an offer of safe passage, like Carlos Altamirano). The radio address was made while gunfire and explosions were audible in the background.

Shortly afterwards, an official announcement declared that Allende had killed himself with an AK-47 rifle. His corpse was carried out of La Moneda Palace wrapped in a poncho by soldiers and fire fighters.

Allende's body was sent to Hospital Militar arriving about 17:30. Among those present during the autopsy was one of his former classmates in university. The autopsy recorded his death as a suicide.

Allende's weapon (the one he used to kill himself) had been given to him as a gift by Fidel Castro. It bore a golden plate engraved: "To my friend and comrade-in-arms, Fidel Castro."

== Official version ==
At approximately 1:50 p.m. local time, Allende ordered the defenders of La Moneda to surrender. The defenders then formed a line from the second floor, down the stairs and onto the Morande street door. Allende went along this queue, shaking hands and thanking everyone personally for their support. At the end of the queue, he turned toward the Independence salon, located in the north-east side of the Palace's second floor.

At the same time, Patricio Guijón, a member of La Moneda's infirmary staff, decided to return upstairs to recover his gas-mask as a souvenir. He heard a noise, and opened the door of the Independence salon in time to see Allende shoot himself with his AK-47. From the other side of the salon and through an open door, José Quiroga, Arsenio Poupin, a member of the cabinet, Enrique Huerta, a palace functionary, two detectives from the presidential security detail, and some presidential security personnel also saw Allende's death, or arrived a few seconds afterwards, attracted by the noise.

"Workers of my country, I have faith in Chile and its destiny. Other men will overcome this dark and bitter moment when treason seeks to prevail. Keep in mind that, much sooner than later, the great avenues will again be opened through which will pass free men to construct a better society. Long live Chile! Long live the people! Long live the workers!"
President Salvador Allende's farewell speech,
September 11, 1973.

=== Witnesses ===
The following witnesses are believed to have been present:

- Patricio Guijón – member of the Presidential Medical Staff
- José Quiroga – member of the Presidential Medical Staff
- Arsenio Poupin Oissel – Presidential Advisor and member of the cabinet
- Enrique Huerta Corvalán – Palace worker
- David Garrido – Detective (Presidential security detail)
- Ricardo Pincheira – Detective (Presidential security detail)
- Pablo Manuel Zepeda Camillieri – Presidential security detail

Of these witnesses, only Guijón spoke about the events immediately after they happened, and was criticised for doing so. Some sources attribute his declarations to "Allende's personal doctor", Enrique Paris Roa, who was at La Moneda as a member of Allende's cabinet. However, Paris was killed shortly after Allende's death. The other witnesses kept silent until after the restoration of democracy in Chile, as they believed that to corroborate the version of a suicide would in some measure downgrade Allende's sacrifice and lend support to the military regime.

Of the two doctors from the Moneda Palace infirmary who witnessed the suicide, Guijón made a statement at the time. However, Quiroga only confirmed the details in 1999.

== Controversy ==
During the subsequent years of the Pinochet regime, debate continued about whether plotters of the coup d'état had assassinated Allende.

Fidel Castro had given Allende the AK-47 used as the suicide weapon. On 28 September 1973 (two weeks after Allende's death), Castro told a crowd in Havana's Plaza de la Revolución that Allende had died in La Moneda wrapped in a Chilean flag, firing at Pinochet troops with Castro's rifle. Over the coming decades, Castro continued to make public addresses relating this version of events. His public statements formed the basis of Robinson Rojas' 1975 book The murder of Allende and the end of the Chilean way to socialism. Rojas asserted that Allende had been killed by Pinochet's military forces while defending the palace.

With the peaceful transition to democracy in Chile in 1990, the view that Allende died by suicide began to gain popular acceptance as different testimonies confirming the details of the suicide became available. Likewise, members of Allende's immediate family including his wife and his daughter, have never disputed that his death was a suicide.

Chilean doctor Luis Ravanal's 2008 article published in the magazine El Periodista stated that Allende's wounds were "not compatible" with suicide. Asked to comment on Dr. Ravanal's hypothesis, Chilean congresswoman Isabel Allende, the President's daughter, said that the suicide version was the correct one.

In late January 2011, a Chilean judge opened an investigation into Allende's death, along with hundreds of other human rights abuses committed during the 1973 coup. In May, Allende's remains were exhumed by order of a Chilean court as part of a criminal investigation into his death. On May 31, 2011, before the court-ordered autopsy had been completed, Televisión Nacional de Chile (TVN) reported that a top-secret military account of Allende's death had been discovered in the home of a former military justice official. The 300-page document was found when the house was destroyed in the 2010 Chilean earthquake. After reviewing the report, two forensic experts told TVN "that they are inclined to conclude that Allende was assassinated."

Results of the autopsy were officially released in mid-July 2011. The team of Chilean medical experts conducting and reviewing the autopsy results confirmed that Allende had died from self-inflicted gunshot wounds. The autopsy results indicated that he had died after shooting himself with an AK-47 which had been set to automatic fire. The shots tore off the top of his head, killing him instantly. The Guardian, a leading UK newspaper, reported that the "scientific autopsy" had confirmed that "Salvador Allende committed suicide during the 1973 coup that toppled his socialist government." According to The Guardian:

British ballistics expert David Prayer said Allende died of two shots fired from an assault rifle that was held between his legs and under his chin and was set to fire automatically. The bullets blew out the top of his head and killed him instantly. The forensics team's conclusion was unanimous. Spanish expert Francisco Etxeberria said: "We have absolutely no doubt" that Allende committed suicide.
