= Tanzi (surname) =

Tanzi is a surname. Notable people with the surname include:

- Calisto Tanzi (1938–2022), Italian businessman and criminal
- Lia Tanzi (born 1948), Italian actress
- Rudolph E. Tanzi, American professor
- Teresa Tanzi (born 1971), American politician

== See also ==
- Tanzi (disambiguation)
