= Chilean land reform =

The Chilean land reform (Spanish: Reforma agraria chilena) was a process of land ownership restructuring that occurred from 1962 to 1973 in different phases. For much of the 20th century agriculture was one of the most backward sectors of Chilean economy. The land reform was initially supported by Chilean right, centre and left political parties plus the Catholic Church and the United States. After the 1973 Chilean coup d'état the ruling right-wing dictatorship initiated a counter-reform that substantially reverted the reform and directed Chilean agriculture into a "neoliberal" model.

== Pre-reform developments ==
Chilean intellectuals like Camilo Vial (1804-1882) had placed no particular emphasis on agriculture for the development of Chile while others like Francisco Encina (1874-1965) considered Chilean agriculture irrelevant for economic and social development. Encina considered that Chile was ready for industrialization.

Conditions in for early 20th century rural workers was harsh with Tancredo Pinochet denouncing the poor conditions of workers in the hacienda of president Juan Luis Sanfuentes during his presidency (1915-1920). Within a dual sector economic model the 20th century Chilean hacienda has been characterized as a prime example of a primitive and rural component. McBride, a Briton who visited Chile in the 1930s, is reported to have been "astounded" to see haciendas with "agricultural methods that reminds of ancient Egypt, Greece or Palestine."

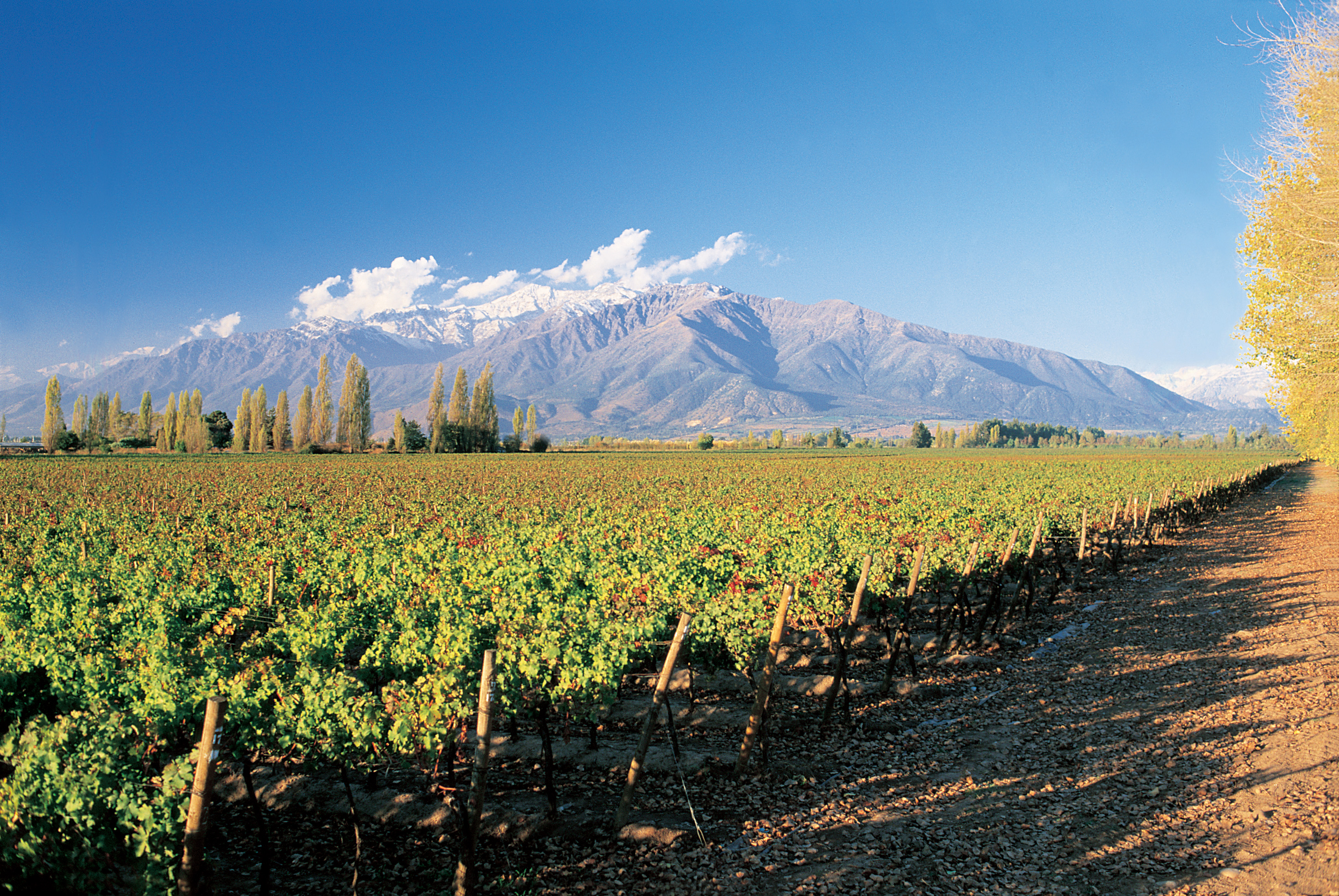
View of a Chilean vineyard. During the 19th century the wine industry was the most developed part of Chilean agriculture. Ownership of vineyards was heavily concentrated.

Demands for a land reform appeared in Chile in the early 20th century and while neglected by the Radical governments (1938–1952) that favoured urban industrialization, in the early 1960s land reform ideas in Chile received support from both the Catholic Church and, through the Alliance for Progress, from the United States. Among Chilean politicians Eduardo Frei Montalva expressed his view in 1958 that both minifundia and latifundia were detrimental for Chilean agriculture.

The agrarian production in Chile contracted from 1950 onwards. A government plan set up in 1954 to address this ended with meager results and in 1958 a new plan was presented. That plan allowed CORFO to develop investments in dairy plants, refrigerated slaughterhouses, sugar refineries and transport infrastructure.

== Land reform ==
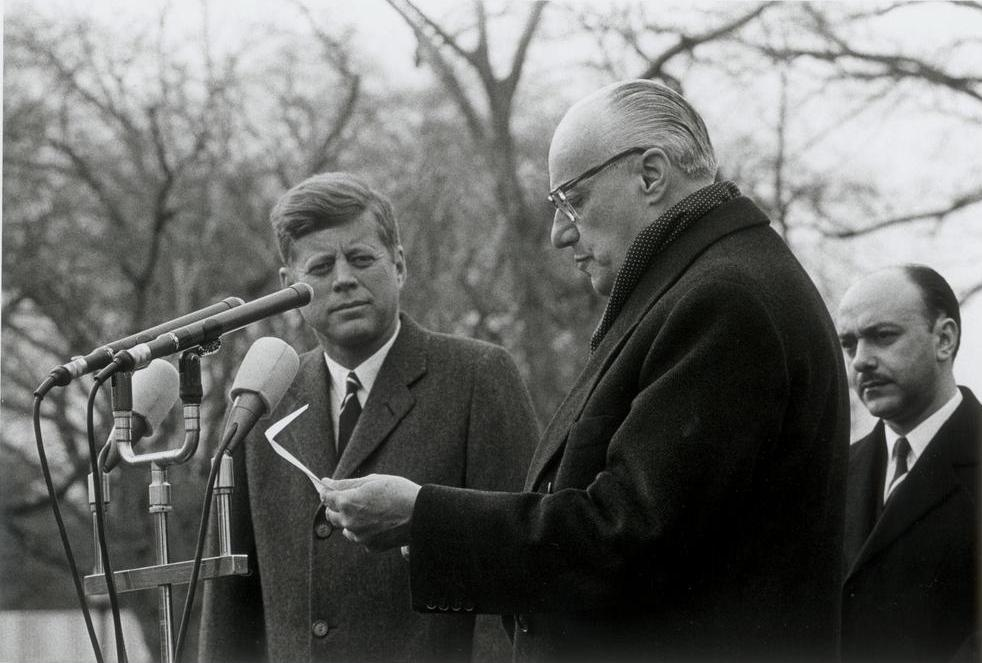
President Jorge Alessandri with President John F. Kennedy in 1962. The administration of both presidents supported the land reform.

=== Alessandri and Frei administrations ===
In 1962, during the government of Jorge Alessandri, the first land reform law was promulgated. This law allowed for the distribution of state-owned land among peasants. The next land reform law was passed in 1967 under the Christian Democrat government of Eduardo Frei Montalva, giving legal status to farmers syndicates. A total of 100 thousand peasants became syndicalized in 400 syndicates. This law served also to expropriate 1,400 land holdings totaling 3,500,000 ha (8,600,000 acres). In the case of the Catholic Church, it began in the 1960s to distribute its lands among peasants.

Besides state reforms in the 1960s, Chilean communists and socialists engaged in the formation of agriculture syndicates through La Frontera and semi-arid Norte Chico. The Christian Democrats did the same around Valparaíso and Aconcagua Valley and in the Central Valley locations of Curicó, Linares and Talca.

=== Unidad Popular years ===
The Popular Unity government led by Salvador Allende that came to power in 1970 continued the land reform and, using the legal tools it inherited, attempted to expropriate all Chilean latifundia (usually known as fundos or estancias). Around 59% of Chile's agricultural lands were redistributed during the Chilean land reform. The hacienda and inquilinaje institutions that characterized large parts of Chilean agriculture were eliminated by land reform.

Economist and Pinochet collaborator José Piñera claims that a "socialist paradigm" was behind the land reform. He adds that the reform evolved into a general attack against property rights and traces the origins of the Chilean nationalization of copper during the Allende years to the Chilean land reform.

== Indigenous involvement ==
The indigenous involvement in the Chilean Land reform that is mostly known about is about the Mapuche-Huilliche communities in the Valdivia province. The Chilean newspaper El Correo de Valdivia communicates that there were at least 19 protests in the form of mobilizations and land redistribution that were made during December of 1970 to August 1973 from indigenous communities with the amount of involvement ranging from 12 to 150 people . Le Bonniec in his article "La participación de las comunidades mapuche-huilliche en el proceso de la Reforma Agraria en la Provincia de Valdivia" mentions the probability that there were many more protests than the 19 mentioned, however the media did not report any of the rest, even so, the pressure of indigenous communities in the land reform is one that existed and that had many effects, especially on indigenous visualization and inclusion.

During this land reform not only did indigenous communities form part of the resistance and the protest movement but they also formed part of the law amendments within Chile, regarding indigenous communities and land. In Historia de la Reforma Agraria en Chile written by José Garrido he writes about the politics of the indigenous land previous to the land reform and compares it to the changes made after the land reform. He mentions a previous law 14.511 in 1961 that recognizes indigenous people as with rights and tax responsibilities, however the goal to incorporate this law was not defined and Garrido describes it as an "increase of restrictions in respect to the indigenous capacity" (Garrido 195). Proving the state's minimal indigenous representation. This was further taken, Garrido writes, when in 1972 the indigenous law 17.729 substituted previous law 14.511 which prevented land titling and increased the necessary paperwork for indigenous people to formally and legally own their land.This remained true until 1979 when laws 2.568 and 2.750 modify it, finally facilitated indigenous ownership of land, through a free and less bureaucratic process. When describing this law Garrido mentions "(...)the policy promoted by the Minister Alfonso Márquez de la Plata and the Vice President of INDAP, Ricardo Hepp, reintroduces the idea of granting the Mapuches the same rights as those enjoyed by the rest of the Chilean nationality, by means of a first step consisting of the delivery of definitive land ownership titles." (Garrido 97) The decrease of a bureaucratic process for the ownership of their land provided integration for indigenous communities to the system. Their intervention in the land reform facilitated further integration.

We can visualize indigenous rights being modified by the comparison Garrido provides from before the land reform and after. Due to an indigenous underrepresentation in Chilean politics at the time, it can be induced that indigenous protests, mobilization and actions taken during the land reform contributed to this change in laws. Evidencing this idea, Article 72, section D of law 16640, the official Land reform law published in Biblioteca del Congreso Nacional de Chile dictates that one of the causes for preference when assigning land will be the provinces where Mapuche indigenous communities possess a land title, provided that they have been personally exploiting this land from November 21, 1965. In other words, if they had worked in any sort of way in the land since 1965, they can claim that land officially their own. This law also allowed for a decrease of exploitation of indigenous free work by landowners. Making a clear statement from these indigenous communities: present in the constitution, present in the country, present in the land reform process, before during and after.

One of the specific examples of the Mapuche-Huilliche involvement during this land reform, Le Bonniec writes, was the conflict of Fundo Malchehue, a property of Leno Monje with the community Dionisio Manquel Chepo. A form of protest of the indigenous community by expropriating land who was originally their ancestors. According to Le Bonniec, medias informed that 36 members of this community had taken over the land the 25th of November of 1971. It was confiscated by the indigenous people in order to form an Agrarian Center Reform. When interviewed, the community simply answered that the property was their ancestor's and it was illegally taken from them. Medias also informed that the indigenous actors were capacitated by what they named "extremists organizations". Le Bonniec writes about the underrepresentation indigenous communities go through when talking about the Chilean Land reform, their participation tends to be forgotten in the media and so, it was of extreme importance when one of their interventions in the land reform ended as a highlight in the media and it contributed to the narrative of their protest. Le Bonniec seems to hint that the importance of the land reform for indigenous communities relied on it being the start of indigenous empowerment, through land ownership.

== Post-coup counter-reform ==
to make Chile not a nation of proletarians, but a nation of proprietors

— Augusto Pinochet

Following the 1973 coup that ousted Allende and brought Pinochet to power individuals and organizations that had benefited from the land reform were oppressed, notably in the first years of dictatorship. In 1974 the military dictatorship begun an agrarian counter-reform. Of the lands expropriated during the land reform about 30% were returned to its former owners during the military dictatorship era, an additional 5% was auctioned. Reformed lands owned by cooperatives were divided into individual properties. The 16½ years of military dictatorship neoliberal economic policies bought a new generation of capitalists to the rural world.

Due to the lack of capital or credit to invest in their lands many peasants sold their lands after the land reform was over. After the land reform there was a process of reconcentration of land ownership so that by 1997 the land ownership was more concentrated than it had been in 1955.

According to scholar Patricio Silva the "neo-liberal" agriculture model implemented by the Pinochet dictatorship was only possible thanks to the land reform.

== See also ==
- Complejo Forestal y Maderero Panguipulli
- Great Drought of 1968–69
