= Macroeconomic populism =

Economic policy

Macroeconomic populism is a term coined by Rudi Dornbusch and Sebastian Edwards in a 1990 paper. The term refers to the policies by many Latin American administrations by which government spending and real wages increase in a non-sustainable way leading to inflation, then stagflation and ultimately an economic collapse that drops real wages to lower than they were before the populist period began. The paper cites as examples Salvador Allende in Chile (1970–1973), and Alan García first term in Peru (1985–1990). In 1991, Dornbusch and Edwards edited a book titled The Macroeconomics of Populism in Latin America which analyzed more cases like Argentina between 1973 and 1976, Mexico between 1970 and 1982, and Brazil.

In 2014, Paul Krugman cited Argentina's policies under Cristina Fernandez de Kirchner and Venezuela as new cases of macroeconomic populism. During a lecture in 2014, he said that he did not endorse the attacks on Argentina nor what it looks to him as a "somewhat out of control fiscal and monetary policy".

== Formal definition ==
The definition of macroeconomic populism in the original paper states as follows: "Macroeconomic populism is an approach to economics that emphasizes growth and income distribution and deemphasizes the risks of inflation and deficit finance, external constraints and the reaction of economic agents to aggressive non-market policies."

== Phases ==
The start of a populist cycle is generally after a stabilization program. The economy has idle capacity and the budget and external balance have room left for an expansionary policy.

1. Phase I includes a high increase in public spending and an increase in real wages and employment. Gross domestic product increases and there is low impact on inflation. Shortages are alleviated by imports. There is a reduction in reserves or debt default.
2. Phase II includes an increase in inflation, although wages keep up. Bottlenecks lead to price and exchange controls. The budget deficit greatly increases as a result of subsidies. The economy runs into stagflation.
3. Phase III is characterized by shortages, extreme acceleration of inflation (possibly hyperinflation), and capital flight. A decline in tax revenue combined with high inflation results in an increase in the budget deficit (Tanzi effect). A stabilization attempt by reducing subsidies and devaluation leads to a drop in real wages. As the paper states "politics become unstable. It becomes clear that the government has lost."
4. Phase IV: A new government implements orthodox policies to stabilize the economy. Once the economy is stabilized real wages will have fallen lower than before Phase I began.
