= Tanzi effect =

Economic situation

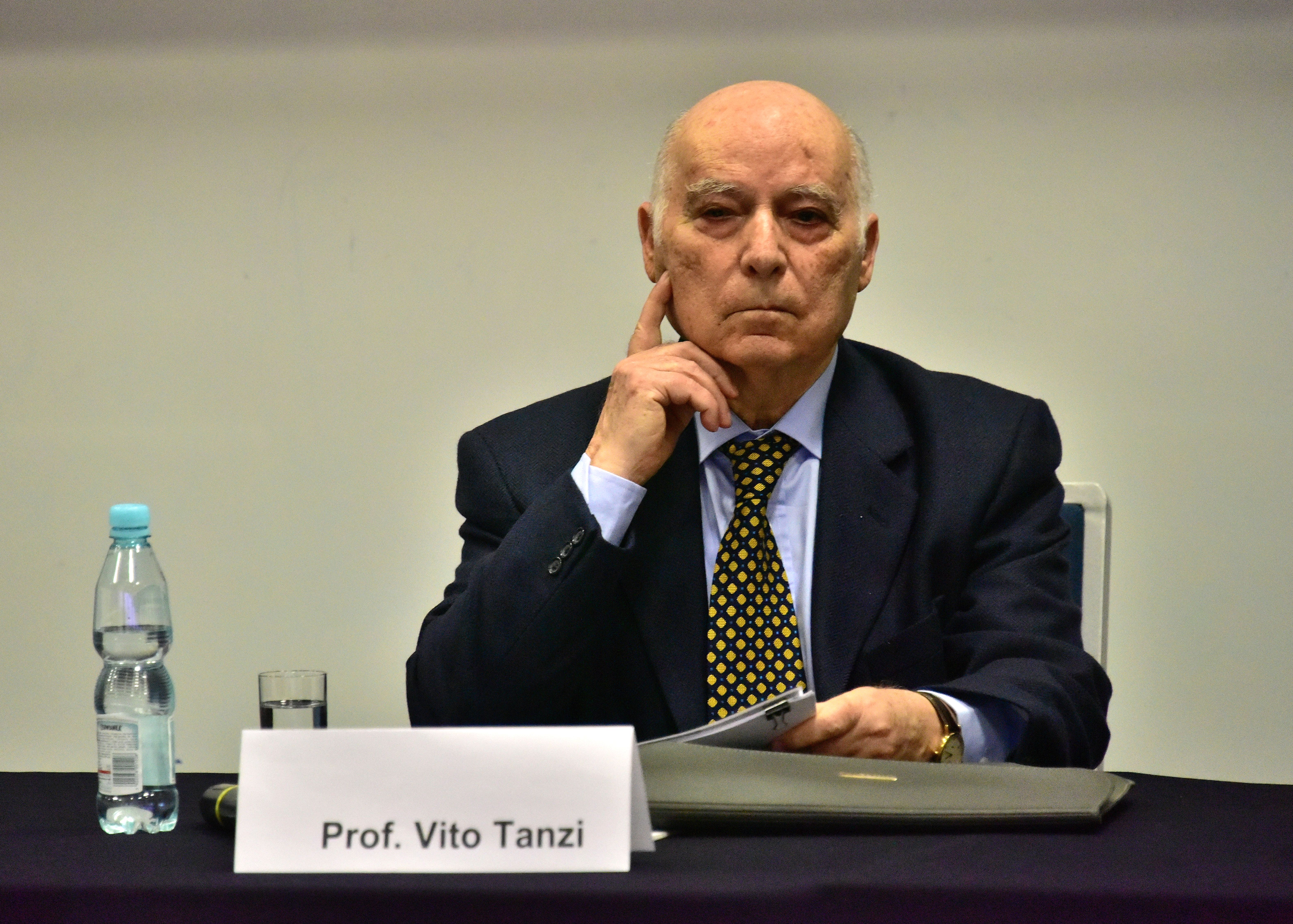
Vito Tanzi (2019).

The Tanzi effect is an economic situation involving a period of high inflation in a country which results in a decline in the volume of tax collection and a deterioration of real tax proceeds being collected by the government of that country. This is due to the time elapsed between the moment the taxable event occurs and the collection of the tax becomes effective. The effect was noticed by economists since the 1920s but it was Italian economist Vito Tanzi that explained the actual causes in a 1977 paper.

== Previous hypothesis ==
The effect has been known since the ending period after World War I. Italian economist Costantino Bresciani Turroni described a similar phenomenon for the German hyperinflation. Previous to the Tanzi paper, a common hypothesis was that the tax administration had somehow become less efficient than before the previous of high inflation. Another hypothesis was that in a period of high inflation people increase their rate of tax evasion. A more sophisticated version of this second hypothesis was that, as inflation rises, banking intermediation shrinks and credit becomes more scarce. In Argentina, the effect is known as the Olivera-Tanzi effect in recognition of Julio H.G. Olivera, who noticed the association between the fall in tax revenue and high inflation. In Tanzi's words "Mr. Olivera had reported the fall but had not provided an explanation for it; instead he had focused on its implications for macroeconomic developments".

== Causes ==
The legal obligation to pay a tax (tax liability) takes place when certain events occur. For example, the obligation to pay a tax on income takes place when income is earned. The obligation to pay a tax on sales occurs when an item subject to the sales tax is sold. The obligation to pay a tax on imports occurs when goods cross the frontier. All these taxable events establish a claim by the government from taxpayers and an obligation by the taxpayers with the government. However, for practical or administrative reasons, the actual tax payments were not being made immediately at the time the taxable event occurred, but some time later. In some cases, much later. For example, taxes on this year's income may not be due until next year. Taxes due on the sale of goods and services may not be paid to the government, by the seller of the goods who withholds the taxes from the consumers (say a shop), until sometime later perhaps 30 or 60 days later. These delays in payment (these collection lags) have little importance when there is no inflation or when the rate of inflation is low. However, the higher the rate of inflation becomes, the lower the real value of the payment received by the government is compared with the value it would have if it had been made immediately after the taxable event; that is, without any delay. Thus, the collection lag becomes a fundamental variable in the determination of real tax revenue in situations of high inflation. When inflation is very high, and a country tries to finance public spending by printing more money, the act of printing more money, by increasing the rate of inflation, could reduce tax revenue by more than the real value of the income from inflationary finance (from the printing of money).

== Consequences ==
A collection lag of two months, which was normal for the payment of sales taxes such as the value-added tax, combined with a monthly rate of inflation of 10%, would lead to a reduction in real tax revenue of about 20%. A monthly inflation rate of 20% would lead to a fall in real tax revenue of about 40%.

== Examples ==
Examples of the Tanzi effect includes all countries with have experienced hyperinflation or very high inflation. Chile under Salvador Allende, Argentina in 1975.

== Solution ==
Although efforts in reducing the collection lag can help, controlling the inflation is the recommended policy. A decrease in inflation will lead to an increase in tax revenue. For example, in 1991, Argentina introduced the convertibility plan that tied the peso to the dollar, abruptly reducing the rate of inflation. The great deceleration in the rate of inflation led to a large increase in real tax revenue. Some countries such as Brazil and Chile went as far as indexing the tax liability for the rate of inflation so as to reduce or neutralize the impact of the tax collection lag on tax revenue.

== See also ==
- Inflation
- Hyperinflation
- Tax revenue

== Bibliography ==
- Tanzi, Vito, "Inflation, Lags in Collection, and the Real Value of Tax Revenue", Staff Papers, vol. 24, March 1977, IMF, 1977, pp. 154–167.
- Tanzi, Vito (2007). Argentina: An Economic Chronicle. How one of the richest countries in the world lost its wealth. Jorge Pinto Books. p. 34. ISBN 978-0979557606.
- Tanzi, Vito (1969). The Individual Income Tax and Economic Growth. Johns Hopkins University Press.
- Tanzi, Vito (1997). Macroeconomics Dimensions of Public Finance. Routledge (UK). ISBN 0-415-14111-7.
- Gerald Turley (2005). Transition, Taxation and the State. Ashgate Publishing, Ltd. ISBN 0-7546-4368-9.
- Julio G. H. Olivera (1967). "Money, Prices and Fiscal Lags: A Note on the Dynamics of Inflation". Quarterly Review. 20. Banca Nazionale del Lavoro: 258–267.
- Felipe Pazos (Spring–Summer 1989). "Need to Design and Apply a More Effective Anti-Inflationary Plan in Latin America". Journal of Interamerican Studies and World Affairs. 31 (1/2, Special Issue: Latin America at the Crossroads: Major Public Policy Issues): 105–123. doi:10.2307/165913. JSTOR 165913.
- Rudiger Dornbusch and Mário Henrique Simonsen (1987). Inflation stabilization with incomes policy support : a review of the experience in Argentina, Brazil, and Israel. New York: Group of Thirty. OCLC 15607804.
