= Julio H.G. Olivera =

Argentine economist

Julio Hipólito Guillermo Olivera (1929–2016) was an Argentine economist, academic, and politician. He is considered one of the progenitors of Latin American structuralism and is credited with developing the so-called "Olivera effect", a non-monetary model of inflation. Olivera was a member of Argentina's Christian Democratic Party. He was nominated for the Nobel Prize in Economics for the years 2000 and 2004.

== Biography ==
Olivera was born on June 11, 1929, in Santiago del Estero, Argentina. He obtained his law degree from the University of Buenos Aires (UBA) in 1951. By 1954, he also completed his doctorate in Law and Social Science with highest distinction at the same institution.

He worked as a professor at UBA and taught within the History of Economic Doctrines and Money, Credit, and Banks departments. He then served as the director of the university’s Institute of Economic Research, which he founded at the Faculty of Economics. In 1962, with the support of Humanist student movement, Olivera was installed as UBA’s rector.

Olivera spent time as a researcher at the Universities of London and Sussex in the United Kingdom. He also became a professor at the Universities of Chicago and Göttingen. In 1967, he taught at Yale University. He was an advisor to the Economic Commission for Latin America (ECLAC) in 1960.

== Economic structuralism ==
In terms of economic structuralism, Olivera did not subscribe to the proposition that since structural inflation is caused by non-financial factors, it can be eliminated through non-financial means. According to him, this was not a necessity and maintained that monetarism cannot ignore the fact that the degree of price flexibility is dependent on the liquidity conditions in the economy.

Olivera wrote about fiscal lags and explained that the real value of tax revenues decreases in high inflation. This became known as the “Olivera effect” and it highlighted the consequence of the time lags in tax collection. The theory, which is also called the "Tanzi effect” in honor of Vito Tanzi who also conceptualized the same phenomenon about the same time, explains that in the case of a time lag, by the time the government receives the money, its purchasing power has already depreciated. This is critical in the theory of structural inflation, because Olivera was able to effectively provide an appropriate analytical framework for the theory.

Olivera was repeatedly consulted by the Swedish government for the selection of Nobel Prize and was, himself, nominated for the Nobel Prize in Economics for the years 2000 and 2004.
