= Carlos Altamirano =

Chilean lawyer and politician (1922–2019)

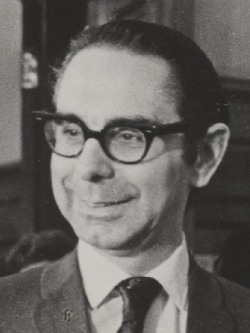

General Secretary of the Chilean Socialist Party
- In office 1971–1979
- Preceded by: Aniceto Rodríguez
- Succeeded by: Clodomiro Almeyda

Member of the Senate of Chile
- In office 15 May 1965 – 21 September 1973

Member of the Chamber of Deputies of Chile
- In office 15 May 1961 – 15 May 1965

Undersecretary of Finances
- In office 1953–1954
- Appointed by: Carlos Ibáñez del Campo
- Preceded by: Eduardo Urzúa Moreno
- Succeeded by: Arturo Fontaine Aldunate

Personal details
- Born: 18 December 1922 Santiago, Chile
- Died: 19 May 2019 (aged 96) Santiago, Chile
- Party: Socialist Party
- Spouse(s): Silvia Celis (divorced) Paulina Violler
- Children: Three
- Parent(s): Carlos Altamirano Rodríguez; Sara Orrego Puelma
- Relatives: Luis Altamirano (uncle-grandfather); Eulogio Altamirano

Carlos Altamirano Orrego (18 December 1922 – 19 May 2019) was a Chilean lawyer and socialist politician. Altamirano was the General Secretary of the Chilean Socialist Party (PS) between 1971 and 1979. Before that, he was deputy from 1961 to 1965 and senator from 1965 to 1973. He fled Chile after Augusto Pinochet's coup d'état in 1973, and was exiled in Cuba, East Germany and France until 1993.

== Biography ==
As a young man, Altamirano won medals in the high jump event at the 1946 and 1947 South American Championships in Athletics. In 1947 he graduated as a lawyer from the University of Chile, where he then served as a professor of public finance and economic law. A member of the Chilean Socialist Party from 1945, he represented the party in the Chamber of Deputies in 1961–1965 and in the Senate in 1965–1973.

A Marxist, Altamirano was one of the most prominent representatives of the left wing of the Socialist Party. On July 26, 1971, having been elected General Secretary of the Socialist Party, he called on President Salvador Allende to dissolve the National Congress. In 1973, sectors of the Chilean Navy tried to convince leaders of the far-right paramilitary organization Patria y Libertad to assassinate him. The plan, however, was not enacted. After the 1973 coup, Altamirano went into exile: after first fleeing to Cuba, he spent the years of Augusto Pinochet's dictatorship in East Berlin (1974–1979) and in Paris (1979–1992). He wrote Dialéctica de una Derrota ("Dialectics of a Defeat") in 1977. During his years in exile, Altamirano would renounce many of his earlier radical political standpoints, instead becoming more of a moderate social democrat. After the beginning of the Chilean transition to democracy in 1990, Altamirano returned to Chile in 1993.

According to lawyer Alun Jones, representative of the Spanish justice during Spain's request to Great Britain for the extradition of Augusto Pinochet, Pinochet had planned an attack against Altamirano just after Francisco Franco's funeral in 1975. A declassified FBI document suggests that Altamirano had become an obsession of DINA director Manuel Contreras, who wanted him assassinated at all cost, but that others within the agency cast doubts, because Altamirano seemed to be a decisive factor among the Chileans living in exile. The same document indicates that the neo-fascists associated with Stefano Delle Chiaie were to assassinate Bernardo Leighton instead.

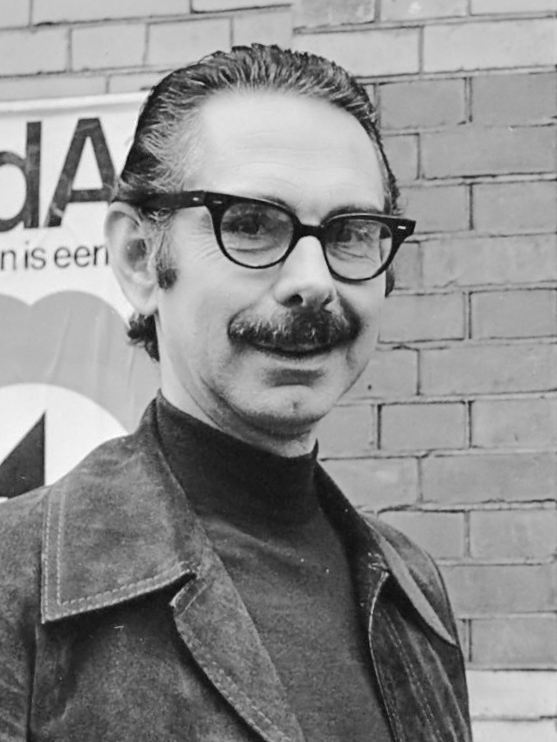
Carlos Altamirano (1974)

== See also ==
- Operation Condor

== Books ==
- Dialéctica de una Derrota (1977) (in Spanish)
- Después de Todo ("After Everything") (in Spanish)
