= Sebastián Edwards =

Chilean economist & professor (born 1953)

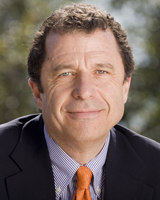
- Born: 16 August 1953 (age 73); Santiago, Chile
- Education: University of Chicago (MA, PhD); Pontifical Catholic University of Chile (Licentiate)
- Occupation: Economist
- Employer: UCLA Anderson School of Management

Sebastián Edwards (born 16 August 1953, Santiago, Chile) is a Chilean-American economist who has served as the Henry Ford II Distinguished Professor of International Economics at the UCLA Anderson School of Management since 2003.

== Early life and career ==
Sebastián Edwards was born in Santiago in 1953, into the Edwards family. He received a licentiate in economics from the Pontifical Catholic University of Chile in 1975, and a PhD in economics from the University of Chicago in 1981. He joined the faculty of the UCLA Anderson School of Management as an assistant professor in 1981, becoming an associate professor in 1985, a full professor in 1988, and a Distinguished Professor in 2003. From 1993 to 1996, Edwards served as Chief Economist for the Latin America and Caribbean Region at the World Bank.

Edwards has been a research associate at the NBER since 1981, and was a co-editor of the Journal of Development Economics from 1991 to 2005. He served as president of the Latin American and Caribbean Economic Association from 2001 to 2003, and has been a member of the Scientific Advisory Council at the Kiel Institute for the World Economy since 2002.

Edwards is the author of more than 200 scientific articles in several academic journals, including the American Economic Review, The Quarterly Journal of Economics, and the Journal of Economic Perspectives.

== Other activities ==
His work and views has been frequently quoted in the media, including The New York Times, the Financial Times, the Los Angeles Times, The Wall Street Journal and The Economist. His op-ed pieces have appeared in the Wall Street Journal, the Financial Times, the Los Angeles Times, the Miami Herald, Newsweek, Time, El País (Madrid), La Vanguardia (Barcelona), La Nación (Argentina), Clarín (Argentina), and La Tercera (Chile). He is also a columnist for Project Syndicate. He is a frequent guest on CNN en Español and other TV and cable news programs.

== Novelist ==
In 2007 he published the novel El Misterio de las Tanias (Alfaguara), a political thriller involving Cuban spies, political kidnappings, and a fabled ransom worth over one billion dollars. The novel was a bestseller in Chile, where it stayed in the Bestseller list for almost 30 weeks. El Misterio de las Tanias was released in Argentina in mid 2008 and in the rest of the Spanish speaking world in 2009.

In May 2011 his second novel Un dia perfecto was published by La otra orilla and Editorial Norma. In Un día perfecto two parallel stories develop during one day—June 10, 1962. On that date Chile's soccer national team unexpectedly defeated the Soviet Union during the World Cup. The first story is a love triangle, while the second one deals with the mysterious disappearance of Lev Yashin, the Soviet famous goalkeeper, known as the "Black Spider". Soon after publication, Un día perfecto joined the list of bestselling novels in Chile. It will be published in the rest of the Spanish speaking world during the second half of 2011.

== Other activities ==
Sebastian Edwards has been a consultant to a number of multilateral institutions, governments and national and international corporations, including the Inter-American Development Bank, the World Bank, the International Monetary Fund, and the Organisation for Economic Co-operation and Development

Professor Edwards has been an expert witness in a number of securities cases that have been litigated in Federal and State courts, and in a number of arbitration cases.

== Books ==
- The Chile Project: The Story of the Chicago Boys and the Downfall of Neoliberalism. Princeton University Press. 2023. ISBN 9780691208626.
- American Default. Princeton University Press. 2018. ISBN 9780691161884.
- Conversación interrumpida (2016)
- Toxic Aid: Economic Collapse and Recovery in Tanzania (2014). Oxford University Press
- Left Behind: Latin America and the False Promise of Populism (2010). University of Chicago Press
- The Decline of Latin American Economies (2007)
- Capital Flows and Capital Controls in Emerging Markets (2007)
- The Economics and Political Transition to an Open Market Economy: Colombia (2001). OECD
- Capital Flows and the Emerging Economies (2000). University of Chicago Press.
- Anatomy of an Emerging-Market Crash: Mexico 1994 (1997). Carnegie Endowment for International Peace
- Labor Markets in Latin America: Combining Social Protection with Market Flexibility (1997). Brookings
- Crisis and Reform in Latin America: From Despair to Hope (1995). Oxford University Press
- Monetarism and Liberalization, The Chilean Experiment (January, 1987), with Alejandra Cox Edwards.
- Exchange Rate Misalignment in Developing Countries (1988)
- Real Exchange Rates, Devaluation and Adjustment: Exchange Rate Policy in Developing Countries (January, 1989)
- Macroeconomics of Populism in Latin America (1989) (coeditor with Rudi Dornbusch).
- Economic Adjustment and Exchange Rates in Developing Countries (1986). University of Chicago Press (coeditor with Liaquat Ahamed)

== Sources ==
- UCLA Anderson School of Management, Faculty webpages
- Sebastián Edwards, Wikipedia español
- Sebastian Edwards' webpage
