= Alberto Baltra =

Chilean politician and economist

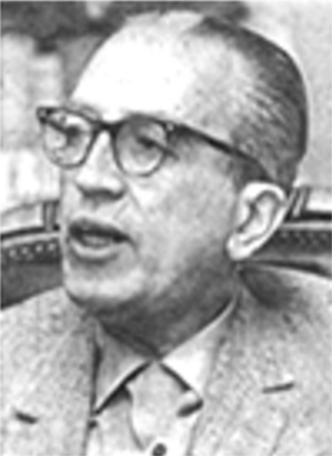

Senator of the Republic of Chile
- In office 1968–1973
- Constituency: Bío Bío, Malleco, and Cautín Circumscription

Minister of Economy, Development and Tourism
- In office 1947–1950
- President: Gabriel González Videla

Personal details
- Born: Alberto Baltra Cortés; 6 January 1912 Traiguén, Chile
- Died: 20 September 1981 (aged 69) Providencia, Chile
- Cause of death: Cardiac arrest
- Party: Radical Party; Radical Left Party
- Spouse: Adriana Olguín
- Children: Luis Alberto Baltra Olguín
- Education: University of Chile
- Occupation: Lawyer, economist, professor, politician
- Awards: Santiago Municipal Literature Award (1960)

Alberto Baltra Cortés (6 January 1912 – 20 September 1981) was a Chilean politician and economist, a member of the Radical Party.

== Biography ==
The son of Luis Baltra Opazo and Luisa Cortés Monroy, Alberto Baltra studied at the Liceo de Traiguén and the National Institute.

He entered the University of Chile, where he received the institution's award for the best graduate in 1935. He obtained his law degree in 1937, with a report entitled Ensayo de una teoría general de los actos inoponibles. As a student, he worked first in the law school library (1930–1932) and later as secretary of the school's director (1932–1934).

Baltra specialized in economics, and in 1935, he became the founder and first director of his alma mater's School of Commerce and Economics. He then taught university and wrote several books on economics.

In 1937, he joined the Radical Party, and under the government of Juan Antonio Ríos, in 1942, he was appointed general director of the Ministry of Economy and Commerce. During the first year of the presidency of Gabriel González Videla, he was appointed undersecretary of Economy and Commerce, and the following year, in 1947, minister of the sector, a position he held until 1950.

In 1948 he became the first president of the United Nations Economic Commission for Latin America and the Caribbean (CEPAL), and led Chile's delegations to the conferences of this organization in Havana (1949), Montevideo (1950), and Mexico (1951). Later he would be a consultant to CEPAL. In 1952 he was appointed vice president of the Saltpeter and Iodine Sales Corporation (COVENSA), and from 1956 to 1958 he was an advisor to the Comptroller General of the Republic. He also became general director of Madeco in 1957.

He held several leading positions in the Radical Party, becoming national president in 1958.

In the complementary elections of 1968 he was elected senator for the eighth provincial group of Bío Bío, Malleco, and Cautín, replacing the late José García González (PDC). Baltra narrowly defeated Jorge Lavandero Eyzaguirre (PADENA), 58,050 votes to 57,284. Miguel Huerta Muñoz (PN) came third with 35,949. For the election, he received the support of the Popular Action Front parties, in what was one of the first rapprochements of radicalism with the rest of the leftist forces.

The following year, he was a candidate for the presidency of Chile for the Radical Party, which was part of Popular Unity, and the latter eventually elected the candidate Salvador Allende.

Baltra, who had been on the left wing of the Radical Party and was president of the Chilean-Soviet Culture Institute, resisted the course his political group was taking during the Allende government. Finally – along with other well-known politicians such as Luis Bossay – he ended up renouncing it on 3 August 1971 and, the same day, forming the Independent Left Radical Movement. Later that year this became the Radical Left Party (PIR). The new group was originally part of Popular Unity, but it later abandoned this alliance and was critical of the Allende government.

For the parliamentary elections of March 1973, the PIR joined with other centre-right opposition parties in the Confederation of Democracy, formed in July 1972, and Baltra ran for Senator for Santiago, but received only 1.92% of the vote.

Baltra wrote several works on economics, some of which were awarded and used as textbooks at the University of Chile. He was a professor there, and among his disciples was the future president Ricardo Lagos, who was his assistant. He was a member of the Chilean Academy of Social, Political, and Moral Sciences.

In 1940 he married the lawyer Adriana Olguín, who would be the first female minister in Latin America to occupy the Justice portfolio under González Videla. The couple had one son, Luis Alberto Baltra Olguín.

Alberto Baltra died on 20 September 1981, the victim of a cardiac arrest while walking down Antonio Varas Street near his house in the district of Providencia.

== Works ==
- Crecimiento económico de América Latina. Problemas Fundamentales, Editorial del Pacífico, Santiago, 1959 (winner of the Santiago Municipal Literature Award)
- Tres países del mundo socialista, Editorial del Pacífico, Santiago, 1962
- Teoría económica, Volume 1, Editorial Andrés Bello, Santiago, 1963
- Otro camino para Chile, Editorial Universitaria, Santiago, 1967
- Gestión económica del Gobierno de la Unidad Popular, Editorial Orbe, Santiago, 1974
