= 1949 Chilean parliamentary election =

Parliamentary elections were held in Chile on 6 March 1949. Although the Social Christian Conservative Party received the most votes in the Senate elections, the Liberal Party won the most seats, whilst the Radical Party remained the largest party in the Chamber of Deputies.

They were the first parliamentary elections with women's suffrage.

== Electoral system ==
The term length for Senators was eight years, with around half of the Senators elected every four years. This election saw 20 of the 45 Senate seats up for election.

== Campaign ==
Having won 15 seats in the Chamber of Deputies in the 1945 elections, the Communist Party was banned in 1948.

== Results ==
=== Senate ===
Party	Votes	%	Seats
Social Christian Conservative Party	55,825	22.28	3
Liberal Party	42,930	17.13	6
Agrarian Labor Party	42,230	16.85	3
Radical Party	42,125	16.81	5
Authentic Socialist Party	15,318	6.11	0
Radical Democracy	10,445	4.17	1
Democratic Party	9,252	3.69	0
Popular Socialist Party	8,772	3.50	1
Radical Doctrinaire Party	8,613	3.44	0
Socialist Party	6,818	2.72	0
Progressive Liberal Party	6,002	2.40	0
National Falange	2,222	0.89	1
Total	250,552	100.00	20
Valid votes	250,552	99.07	
Invalid/blank votes	2,351	0.93	
Total votes	252,903	100.00	
Registered voters/turnout	316,186	79.99	
Source: Nohlen

=== Chamber of Deputies ===
Party	Votes	%	Seats	+/–
Radical Party	100,869	21.70	34	–5
Social Christian Conservative Party	98,118	21.11	31	–5
Liberal Party	83,582	17.98	33	+2
Agrarian Labor Party	38,742	8.33	14	+11
Radical Democracy	23,248	5.00	8	New
Popular Socialist Party	22,631	4.87	6	New
Democratic Party	20,682	4.45	6	0
National Falange	18,221	3.92	3	0
Socialist Party	15,676	3.37	5	–1
People's Democratic Party	8,536	1.84	1	New
Traditionalist Conservative Party	7,485	1.61	2	New
Progressive Liberal Party	6,431	1.38	2	–1
Authentic Socialist Party	5,125	1.10	1	–2
Laborista Party	5,105	1.10	1	–
Radical Doctrinaire Party	4,424	0.95	1	–
Social Christian Movement	2,018	0.43	1	–
Democrat Party	1,994	0.43	0	–1
Chilean Renovating Action	1,985	0.43	0	New
Total	464,872	100.00	147	0
Valid votes	464,872	98.83		
Invalid/blank votes	5,504	1.17		
Total votes	470,376	100.00		
Registered voters/turnout	591,994	79.46		
Source: Nohlen
