= 1953 Chilean parliamentary election =

Parliamentary elections were held in Chile on 1 March 1953. The Agrarian Labor Party emerged as the largest party in the Chamber of Deputies, whilst the Liberal Party won the most seats in the Senate.

== Electoral system ==
The term length for Senators was eight years, with around half of the Senators elected every four years. This election saw 25 of the 45 Senate seats up for election.

== Results ==
=== Senate ===
Party	Votes	%	Seats
Radical Party	59,270	17.62	4
Agrarian Labor Party	55,775	16.58	3
Liberal Party	42,993	12.78	5
Traditionalist Conservative Party	41,278	12.27	4
Popular Socialist Party	31,608	9.40	3
National Ibañista Movement	29,861	8.88	2
Social Christian Conservative Party	19,123	5.69	0
People's Democratic Party	17,138	5.10	1
National Union of Independents	11,342	3.37	1
People's National Movement	10,556	3.14	1
Chilean Renovating Action	6,915	2.06	0
Democratic Party	3,840	1.14	0
National Falange	3,276	0.97	0
Christian National Party	1,931	0.57	0
Radical Doctrinaire Party	1,230	0.37	0
Laborista Party	205	0.06	0
National Movement of Pensioners	18	0.01	0
Total	336,359	100.00	24
Registered voters/turnout	484,064	–	
Source: Nohlen

=== Chamber of Deputies ===
Party	Votes	%	Seats	+/–
Agrarian Labor Party	118,483	15.20	26	+12
Radical Party	103,650	13.29	18	–16
Liberal Party	84,924	10.89	23	–10
Traditionalist Conservative Party	78,833	10.11	16	+14
Popular Socialist Party	68,218	8.75	20	+14
Socialist Party	41,676	5.35	9	+4
National Union of Independents	39,877	5.11	5	New
People's Democratic Party	31,961	4.10	5	+4
Social Christian Conservative Party	33,332	4.28	2	–29
National Ibañista Movement	28,976	3.72	6	New
National Falange	22,353	2.87	3	0
Christian National Party	21,381	2.74	4	New
People's National Movement	19,238	2.47	1	New
Radical Doctrinaire Party	17,882	2.29	3	+3
Democrat Party	11,570	1.48	1	+1
Laborista Party	8,171	1.05	1	+1
Agrarian Party	8,125	1.04	2	New
People's Unity	2,344	0.30	1	New
Other parties	38,627	4.95	1	–
Total	779,621	100.00	147	0
Registered voters/turnout	1,100,027	–		
Source: Nohlen
