= 1949 Chilean senatorial by-election =

- Sunday 26 June 1949
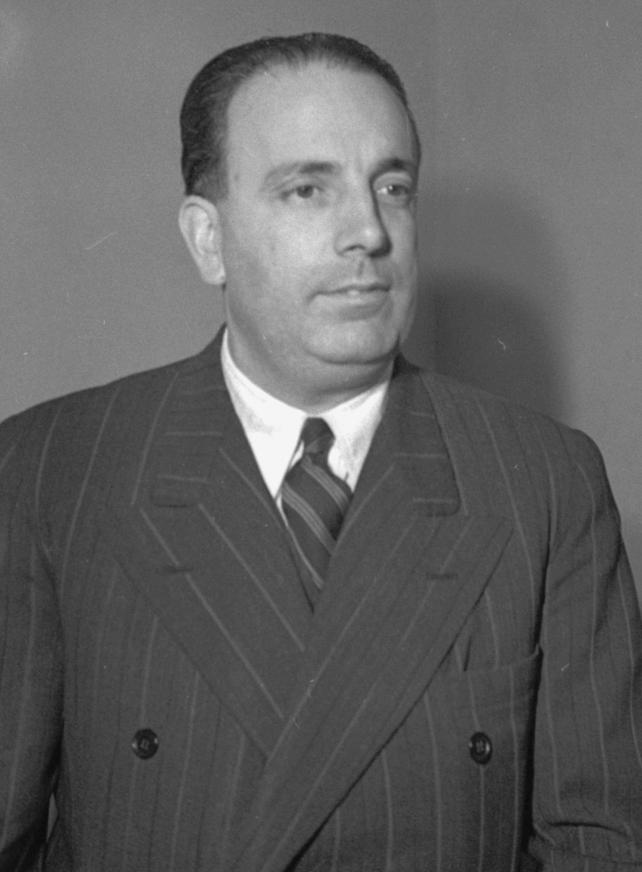

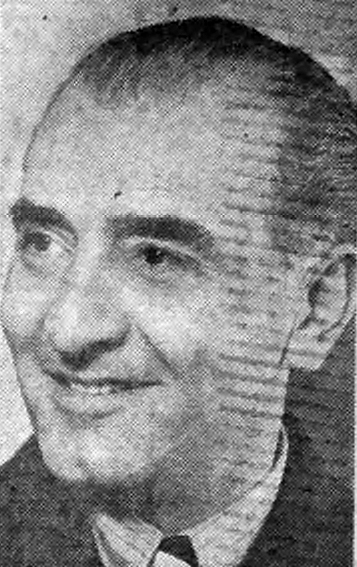
Candidate	Sergio Fernández Larraín	Francisco Labbé
Party	PCT	PCSC
Popular vote	22709	15,202
Percentage	59.90	40.10%

A senatorial by-election was held in Chile on June 26, 1949, to fill the vacant Senate seat for the 5th provincial grouping (O'Higgins and Colchagua) following the death of the incumbent senator Miguel Cruchaga Tocornal (Conservative Party) on May 3.

It was the first parliamentary election in which women could vote, after the implementation of Law 9292 on January 8, 1949, which gave women the right to vote in parliamentary and presidential elections, since previously, they could only vote in council elections. The complementary election was also one of the events that produced the breakup of the Conservative Party into 2 factions: one traditionalist and the other social-Christian.

== Candidates and campaign ==
On May 9, 1949, the Social Christian Conservative Party (PCSC), one of the factions that split from the Conservative Party after the vote on the Law of Permanent Defense of Democracy, rejected to join with the Traditionalist Conservative Party (PCT). The next day, the PCSC nominated Alberto Echenique Domínguez, who rejected in the following days.

On May 11, the decree calling the election for June 26, 1949 was publicized. On May 14, the PCT nominated Sergio Fernández Larraín, and the next day announced their definitive split from the Conservative Party, when the Christian-socialist board of directors (headed by Horacio Walker Larraín) agreed to erase the members of the traditionalist board and their parliamentarians from its records.

On May 17, the PCSC nominated Francisco Javier Labbé Labbé, while the Liberal Party supported the candidacy of Fernández. On May 30, the National Executive Committee of the Radical Party (PR) agreed to decree freedom of action for its militants in the supplementary election.

The candidacy of Fernández was finalized in the Electoral Service on June 10.

== Results ==
Candidate	Party	Votes	%
Sergio Fernández Larraín	Traditionalist Conservative Party	22,709	59.90
Francisco Labbé	Social Christian Conservative Party	15,202	40.10
Total		37,911	100.00
Valid votes		37,911	99.58
Invalid votes		54	0.14
Blank votes		107	0.28
Total votes		38,072	100.00
Registered voters/turnout		49,214	77.36
Source: La Nación

=== Results by commune ===
Commune	Fernández	Labbé	Null	Blank
O'Higgins Province
Rancagua	1603	3003	0	0
Machalí	771	1381	23	0
Graneros	1071	966	0	0
Mostazal	492	227	0	0
Doñihue	747	200	0	0
Coltauco	285	264	0	0
Peumo	799	344	0	5
Las Cabras	573	321	0	4
San Vicente	1907	996	0	0
Pichidegua	712	309	0	0
Rengo	1158	1587	3	27
Requinoa	621	234	4	5
Olivar	266	153	2	0
Malloa	696	524	0	8
Coinco	540	151	0	0
Quinta de Tilcoco	312	461	0	0
Total	12 553	11 121	35	59
Colchagua Province
Santa Cruz	1119	459	0	3
Palmilla	957	195	0	0
Peralillo	615	236	0	0
Marchigüe	290	227	2	1
Rosario	237	60	0	0
Pichilemu	523	216	4	10
Pumanque	405	62	0	0
Chépica	641	184	0	0
Paredones	220	36	1	0
La Estrella	382	113	0	0
San Fernando	2184	1341	12	34
Chimbarongo	1050	575	0	0
Nancagua	871	299	0	0
Placilla	662	78	0	0
Total	10 156	4081	19	48
Source: La Nación.

== Reactions ==
The minister of the Interior, Immanuel Holger, proclaimed that the election occurred peacefully. In the provincial grouping, 49,241 men and women were registered to vote. The winning candidate, Sergio Fernández Larraín, claimed that with the result, "communism was defeated."

Fernández was incorporated into the Senate on August 2, after the Election Certification Court officially named him senator elect.
