= New Democratic Left =

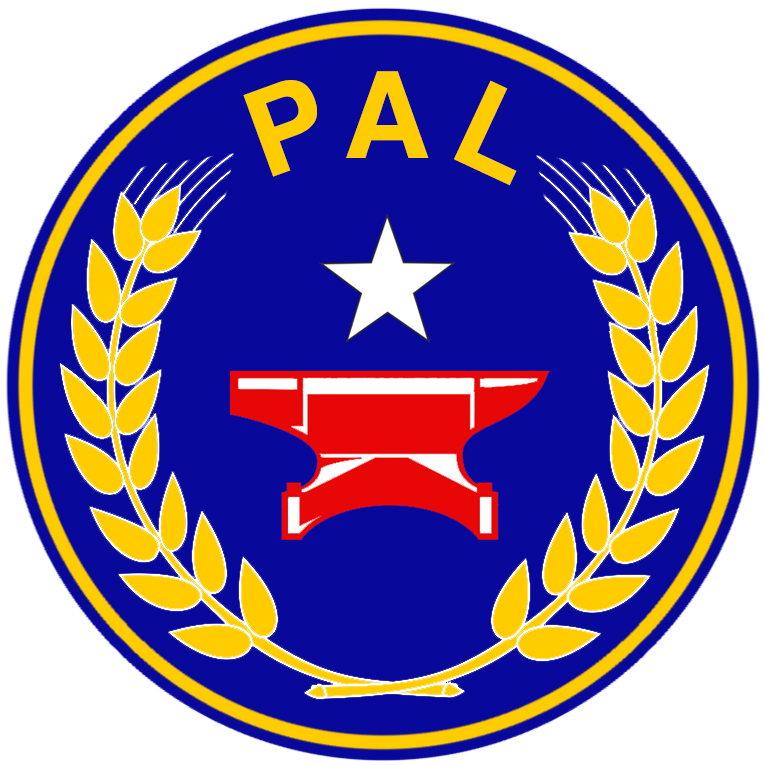
- President: Rafael de la Presa
- Founded: 17 August 1963
- Dissolved: 20 December 1963
- Ideology: Social democracy Populism
- Political position: Centre-left

The New Democratic Left (Spanish: Nueva Izquierda Democrática) was a political party in Chile. It was founded in 1963 by former members of the National Democratic Party (PDN), who had left PDN in protest of the party joining the Popular Action Front (FRAP). FRAP supported Salvador Allende in the 1964 presidential election, whereas NID supported Eduardo Frei. NID was later dissolved, and most of its members joined the Agrarian Labor Democracy.
