= 1973 Chilean parliamentary election =

- 4 March 1973
- Chamber of Deputies
- All 150 seats in the Chamber of Deputies
Party	Vote %	Seats	+/–
Confederation of Democracy (87 seats)
PDC	29.07	50	−6
National	21.51	34	+1
Radical Democracy	1.94	2	New
Radical Left	1.66	1	New
Popular Unity (63 seats)
Socialist	18.70	28	+13
Communist	16.36	25	+3
Radical	3.69	5	−19
MAPU	2.55	2	New
Christian Left	1.15	1	New
API	0.83	2	New
This lists parties that won seats. See the complete results below.
- Senate
- 25 of the 50 seats in the Senate
Party	Vote %	Seats	+/–
Confederation of Democracy (30 seats)
PDC	33.88	19	−3
National	18.97	8	+3
Radical Left	1.56	3	New
Popular Unity (19 seats)
Socialist	17.84	7	+3
Communist	17.29	9	+3
Radical	5.77	2	−7
Christian Left	–	1	New
Other parties (1 seat)
USOPO	–	1	−1
This lists parties that won seats. See the complete results below.

Parliamentary elections were held in Chile on 4 March 1973, They resulted in a victory for the Confederation of Democracy, an opposition alliance led by the National Party and the Christian Democratic Party. However, they were unable to secure the necessary two-thirds majority in the Senate to remove President Salvador Allende from office.

The approval of Law No. 17,284 in 1970 led to a rise in voter participation. These elections marked the implementation of the reform on a nationwide scale, resulting in the highest level of voter engagement within the previous democratic system. Around 80.6% of the electorate (equivalent to 44% of the national population) were registered to vote, and 81% of the registered voters (approximately 3.7 million individuals) exercised their right to vote.

== Background ==
Since the early 1960s, the Chilean economy had experienced sustained inflationary growth, which continued under the Salvador Allende government and was considered a major factor in the economic crisis of 1972. In response to inflation, the government implemented the Vuskovic plan, aiming to increase state control over the economy. Measures included nationalizing companies and setting official prices through central planning. These interventions resulted in low wages, product shortages and the emergence of a black market.

Additionally, the high inflation led to dissatisfaction among the upper and middle classes, as there was a significant expropriation of companies towards the private sector. This dissatisfaction culminated in the October 1972 strike, which aimed to halt expropriations, establish market-adjusted prices, and protect private property. The government faced numerous social demonstrations against its policies and the high cost of living. The right-wing and the Christian Democratic Party largely supported and participated in these mobilizations, aiming to discredit the government's policies, socially isolate them, and pressure for policy changes and the government's resignation.

On another front, the Allende government continued the agrarian reform initiated by previous administrations but on a larger scale. More than six million hectares of land were expropriated and distributed among thousands of peasants and small landowners in rural Chile. This led to increased social and political divisions within the country, as different social groups had contrasting views on the government's measures and progress. The discontent caused by these policies further polarized Chilean society. Ultimately, the country became divided into two major blocs, leading to a tense and polarized political climate.

== Electoral system ==
The term length for Senators was eight years, with around half of the Senators elected every four years. This election saw 25 of the 50 Senate seats up for election.

== Political parties and electoral pacts ==
Before the elections several political parties underwent internal divisions and splintered into smaller factions. While the majority of Christian Democrats led the Freiist faction, other groups formed the Popular Unitary Action Movement (MAPU) and the Christian Left, which later joined the Popular Unity. Dissident radicals from the central leadership divided into two factions, Radical Democracy, a traditional right-wing group, and the Radical Left Party, a moderate social democratic faction that initially supported Allende but later became opposition in 1972.

In anticipation of the elections, the Confederation of Democracy was established in July 1972. It was a coalition comprising center and right-wing parties including the Christian Democrats, National Party, Radical Left Party, Radical Democracy, and the National Democratic Party, all opposed to Popular Unity. Apart from these two primary electoral pacts, the Popular Socialist Union, a small left-wing group that had split from the Socialist Party, also participated in the elections.

== Opinion polls ==
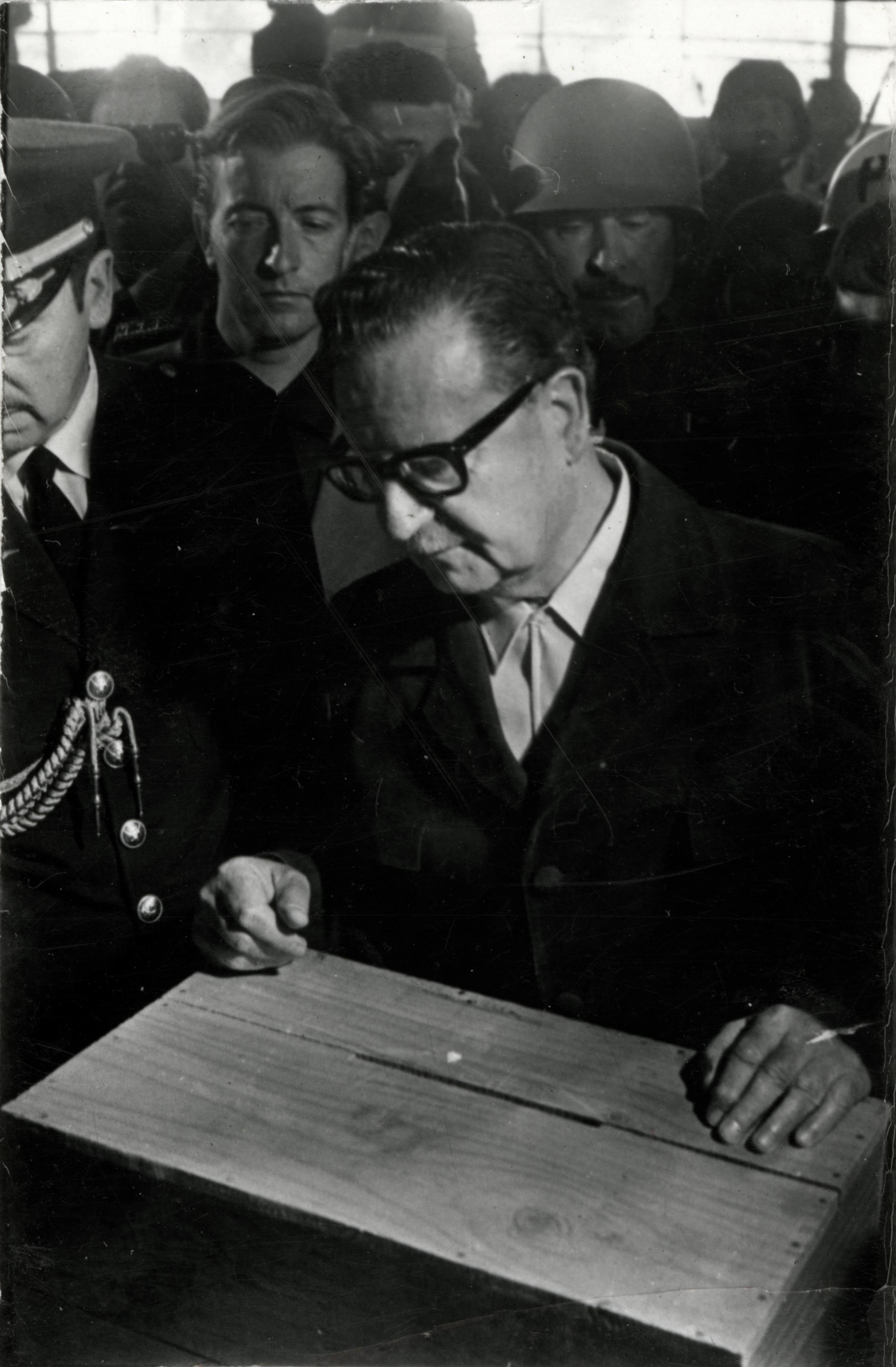
President Salvador Allende voting in the parliamentary elections of 1973.

The political, social, and economic crisis gave an apparent advantage to the opposition. The polls predicted a favorable outcome for them, ranging between 58% and 62%. The election results, therefore, presented a dual scenario: while the opposition retained the majority, the Popular Unity had obtained more votes than expected, reaching 44.03% against the CODE's 55.70%. Despite being referred to as a surprising result, the truth was that the percentage of votes achieved by the left-wing coalition was practically the same as what the same parties had obtained in the parliamentary elections of 1969 (43.84%). The resulting balance of power would prevent the Senate from constitutionally accusing President Allende.

== Conduct ==
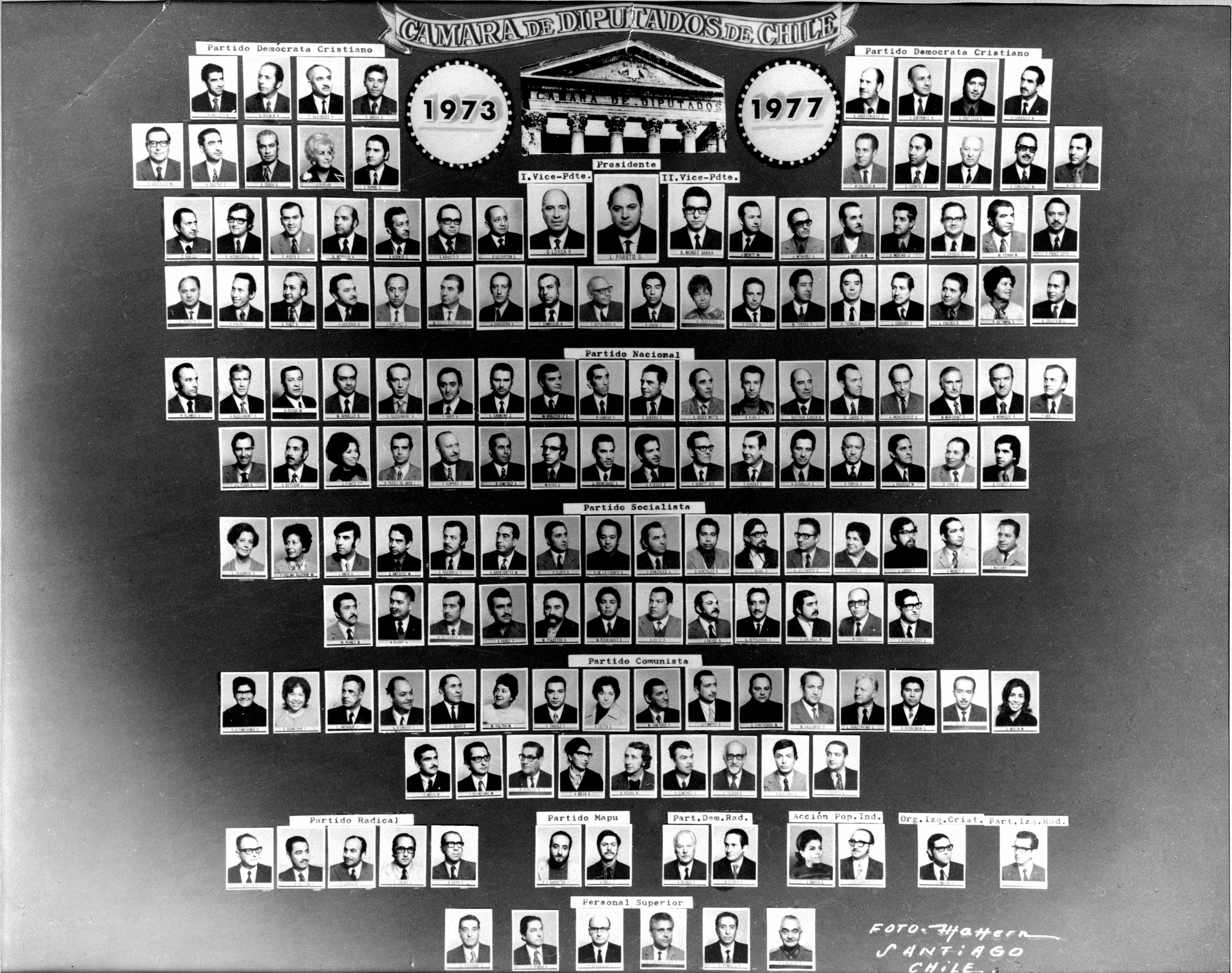
Composition of the Chamber of Deputies for the period 1973–1977.

Following the elections, allegations of electoral fraud emerged. An investigation by the Law School of the Pontifical Catholic University of Chile, led by Jaime del Valle and presented by Canal 13 on the evening of 17 July, established the existence of alleged electoral fraud estimated at 200,000 votes, based on supposed false registrations and manipulation of records.

The director of the Electoral Registry, Andrés Rillón, dismissed the accusations, stating that the complaint itself did not prove the existence of fraud. At the same time, the director of the Civil Registry and Identification Service, Heriberto Benquis, ruled out the alleged fraudulent registration of citizens. The pro-government press reported that Jaime del Valle had manipulated the identification data of some of the voters presented in the investigation, replacing digits in their ID numbers.

The allegations were examined by an Investigative Commission in the Chamber of Deputies, which was established on 24 July but ceased its operations when Congress was dissolved after the 11 September coup d'état. During a session of the Commission for the Study of the New Constitution, it established the practical ineffectiveness of the electoral records and the need of purification. Consequently, the registers were declared void by Decree Law No. 130 on 19 November 1973 and destroyed on 6 July 1974. In October 1986, with the Chilean Electoral Service replacing the former Electoral Registry Directorate, new voter registries were opened.

== Results ==
=== Senate ===
Party or alliance		Votes	%	Seats	
Party or alliance		Votes	%	Won	Total
Confederation of Democracy	Christian Democratic Party	745,274	33.88	10	19
Confederation of Democracy	National Party	417,311	18.97	4	8
Confederation of Democracy	Radical Democracy	47,992	2.18	0	0
Confederation of Democracy	Radical Left Party	34,334	1.56	0	3
Confederation of Democracy	CODE list votes	14,432	0.66	0	0
Confederation of Democracy	Total	1,259,343	57.25	14	30
Popular Unity	Socialist Party	392,469	17.84	5	7
Popular Unity	Communist Party	380,460	17.29	5	9
Popular Unity	Radical Party	126,961	5.77	1	2
Popular Unity	Popular Unitary Action Movement	23,191	1.05	0	0
Popular Unity	Popular Unity list votes	17,431	0.79	0	0
Popular Unity	Christian Left			–	1
Popular Unity	Total	940,512	42.75	11	19
Popular Socialist Union				–	1
Total		2,199,855	100.00	25	50
Registered voters/turnout		4,510,060	–		
Source: Electoral Service, State Department

=== Chamber of Deputies ===
Party or alliance		Votes	%	Seats	+/–
Confederation of Democracy	Christian Democratic Party	1,055,120	29.07	50	–6
Confederation of Democracy	National Party	780,480	21.51	34	+1
Confederation of Democracy	Radical Democracy	70,582	1.94	2	New
Confederation of Democracy	Radical Left Party	60,166	1.66	1	New
Confederation of Democracy	National Democratic Party	13,349	0.37	0	0
Confederation of Democracy	CODE list votes	33,895	0.93	0	–
Confederation of Democracy	Total	2,013,592	55.49	87	–2
Popular Unity	Socialist Party	678,796	18.70	28	+13
Popular Unity	Communist Party	593,738	16.36	25	+3
Popular Unity	Radical Party	133,745	3.69	5	–19
Popular Unity	Popular Unitary Action Movement	92,592	2.55	2	New
Popular Unity	Christian Left	41,589	1.15	1	New
Popular Unity	Independent Popular Action	29,972	0.83	2	New
Popular Unity	Popular Unity list votes	34,738	0.96	0	–
Popular Unity	Total	1,605,170	44.23	63	+2
Popular Socialist Union		10,287	0.28	0	0
Total		3,629,049	100.00	150	0
Valid votes		3,629,049	98.43		
Invalid/blank votes		58,056	1.57		
Total votes		3,687,105	100.00		
Registered voters/turnout		4,510,060	81.75		
Source: Electoral Service
