= Democratic Front of Chile =

The Democratic Front of Chile (Spanish: Frente Democrático de Chile) was a center-right coalition in Chile between 1962 and 1964. It was composed of the United Conservative Party, the Liberal Party and the Radical Party (which had turned rightwards after the Radical Governments period).

Created on October 10, 1962, the Democratic Front presented itself as an alternative to the left-wing FRAP coalition. It presented the Radical Julio Durán for the 1964 presidential election, who obtained less than 5% of the votes. Furthermore, the defeat of the Democratic Front during the Naranjazo on March 15, 1964, led the Radical Party to withdraw itself from the coalition, leading to the dissolution of the Front in March.

Liberals and conservatives decided to support the candidate of the Christian Democrat Party, Eduardo Frei Montalva, for the 1964 presidential election, in the hopes of avoiding the victory of the FRAP candidate Salvador Allende, while the Radical Party re-presented again, but alone, the candidacy of Julio Durán.
