= El Mundo Árabe =

Newspaper in Chile

- Founder: Jorge Sabaj Zurob
- Editor: Elias Sabaj
- Founded: 1931

El Mundo Árabe is a newspaper of Arab culture in Chile.

== History ==
El Mundo Árabe was founded by Jorge Sabaj Zurob, a Palestinian immigrant, in 1931. During World War II, it was banned by the Allied Forces because it published Nazi propaganda. In 1949, it was again accused of stoking anti-semitic sentiment in Chile.

In 2014, the Senate of Chile celebrated its 82nd anniversary, with Eugenio Tuma and Francisco Chahuán, two senators of Palestinian descent, speaking about its founder.
