= Juan Tuma Masso =

Chilean politician

Juan Tuma
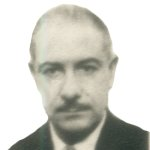
- Official portrait (2014)

Member of the Chamber of Deputies
- In office 15 May 1961 – 15 May 1969
- Constituency: Araucanía Region (21st District)

Personal details
- Born: 24 November 1908 Guayaquil, Ecuador
- Died: 14 July 1972 (aged 63) Santiago, Chile
- Party: Agrarian Labor Party (1946–1958); National Democratic Party (1960–1965); Social Democrat Party (1965–1972)
- Spouse: María Zedán
- Children: Four (among them, Eugenio and Joaquín)
- Parent(s): Simón Tuma; Emilia Masso
- Occupation: Politician; Entrepreneur

Juan Tuma Masso (24 November 1908 – 14 July 1972) was a Chilean politician who served as Deputy for his country.
