= Frente Democrático =

Frente Democrático may refer to:

- Democratic Front of Chile
- Democratic Front (Peru)
