= 1969 Chilean parliamentary election =

- 2 March 1969
- Chamber of Deputies
- All 150 seats in the Chamber of Deputies
Party	Vote %	Seats	+/–
PDC	31.05	56	−26
National	20.82	33	+24
Communist	16.6	22	+4
Radical	13.59	24	+4
Socialist	12.76	15	0
This lists parties that won seats. See the complete results below.
- Senate
- 30 of the 50 seats in the Senate
Party	Vote %	Seats	+/–
PDC	34.32	22	+9
Communist	18.04	6	+1
Radical	17.23	9	0
National	15.99	5	−2
Socialist	11.99	4	−3
USOPO	2.43	2	New
API	–	1	New
Social Democrat	–	1	New
This lists parties that won seats. See the complete results below.

Parliamentary elections were held in Chile on 2 March 1969. The Christian Democratic Party lost their majority in the Chamber of Deputies, but remained the largest party in both houses.

== Electoral system ==
The term length for Senators was eight years, with around half of the Senators elected every four years. This election saw 25 of the 50 Senate seats up for election.

== Results ==
=== Senate ===
Party	Votes	%	Seats		
Party	Votes	%	Won	Total	+/–
Christian Democratic Party	345,248	34.32	12	22	+9
Communist Party	181,488	18.04	3	6	+1
Radical Party	173,386	17.23	5	9	0
National Party	160,875	15.99	5	5	–2
Socialist Party	120,629	11.99	4	4	–3
Popular Socialist Union	24,423	2.43	1	2	New
Independent Popular Action			–	1	New
Social Democrat Party			–	1	New
Total	1,006,049	100.00	30	50	+5
Registered voters/turnout	3,223,892	–			
Source: Nohlen, Whelan

=== Chamber of Deputies ===
Party	Votes	%	Seats	+/–
Christian Democratic Party	716,547	31.05	56	–26
National Party	480,523	20.82	33	+24
Communist Party	383,049	16.60	22	+4
Radical Party	313,559	13.59	24	+4
Socialist Party	294,448	12.76	15	0
Popular Socialist Union	51,904	2.25	0	New
National Democratic Party	44,818	1.94	0	–3
Social Democrat Party	20,560	0.89	0	New
Independents	2,104	0.09	0	0
Total	2,307,512	100.00	150	+3
Valid votes	2,307,512	95.90		
Invalid/blank votes	98,617	4.10		
Total votes	2,406,129	100.00		
Registered voters/turnout	3,244,892	74.15		
Source: Nohlen
