= Adriana Olguín =

Chilean lawyer and politician

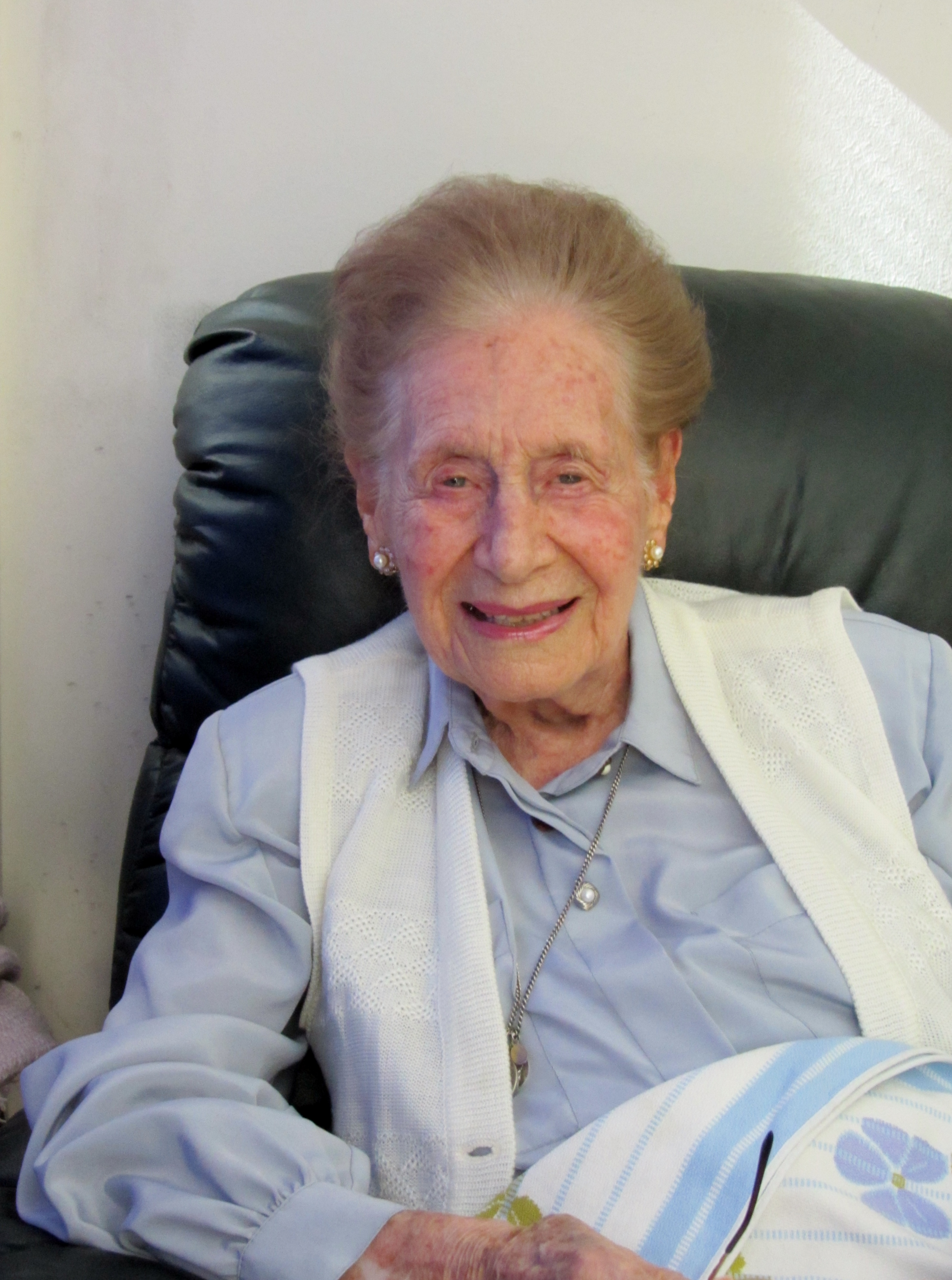
- Adriana Olguín de Baltra in 2012

Minister of Justice
- In office 29 July 1952 – 3 November 1952
- President: Gabriel González Videla
- Preceded by: Humberto Parada Berger
- Succeeded by: Orlando Latorre González

Personal details
- Born: Luz Adriana Margarita Olguín Buche; 18 November 1911 Valparaíso, Chile
- Died: 24 December 2015 (aged 104) Viña del Mar, Chile
- Party: Independent (caucuses with Radical Party)
- Spouse: Alberto Baltra
- Education: University of Chile
- Occupation: lawyer, politician

Adriana Margarita Olguín Büche (born Luz Adriana Margarita Olguín Buche; 18 November 1911 – 24 December 2015) was a Chilean lawyer and politician. She served as Minister of Justice under President Gabriel González Videla, becoming the first female cabinet minister in Latin America.

== Early life and education ==
Adriana Olguín de Baltra was born in Valparaíso in 1911 to Arsenio Olguín and Adela Büche.

After studying in her hometown at the Liceo No 2 de Niñas, she enrolled in the Faculty of Law and Social Sciences at the University of Chile. Olguín completed her thesis in 1936, titled Las lagunas de la ley y el arbitrio judicial («Legal Loopholes and Judicial Discretion»). Two years later, she became a licensed lawyer with «unanimous distinction».

While at university, she met her future husband, Alberto Baltra, with whom she had one son, Luis Alberto.

== Career ==
After graduation, Olguín held several positions, both as a professional attorney for Valparaiso Customs and as a professor of Constitutional and Administrative Law. She was also politically active, being involved in the Federación Chilena de Instituciones Femeninas (Chilean Federation of Women's Institutions, FECHIF). Like her husband, she sympathized with the Radical Party, though she was never an active member.

Between 1946 and 1953, she headed the Oficina de la Mujer (Women’s Office). In July 1952, she was appointed Minister of Justice by President Gabriel González Videla. Though she served only a short period of time, she is credited as being the first woman ever to hold a cabinet post in Latin America. In 1955, she served as the first woman counselor for the Colegio de Abogados.

In 1981, following the approval of the previous year’s constitution, she assumed the position of State Counselor. Two years later, she became the only female full member of the Academia de Ciencias Sociales, Políticas y Morales (Academy of Social, Political, and Moral Sciences), serving as its vice president from 1995 to 2000.
