= Popular Socialist Union (Chile) =

Defunct political party in Chile

Popular Socialist Union Unión Socialista Popular
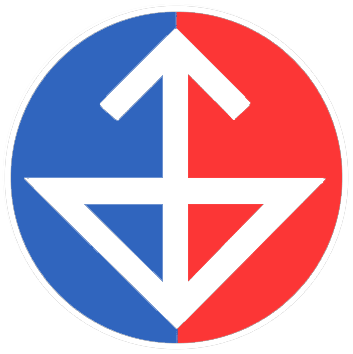
- Founded: 12 October 1967
- Dissolved: January 1990
- Split from: Socialist Party of Chile
- Merged into: Socialist Party of Chile
- Headquarters: Santiago de Chile
- Ideology: Democratic socialism
- Political position: Centre-left to left-wing

The Popular Socialist Union (Spanish: Unión Socialista Popular) was a Chilean centre-left to left-wing political party that existed between 1967 and 1990.

== History ==
The party was founded on October 12, 1967, by a group of dissidents expelled from the Socialist Party of Chile (PS) as a result of the National Plenum of the XXI Party Congress. Its members were Senators Raúl Ampuero and Tomás Chadwick Valdés with Deputies Ramón Silva Ulloa, Eduardo Osorio Pardo, Óscar Naranjo, José Andrés Aravena and Ernesto Guajardo.

The parliamentary elections of 1969 elected Silva Ulloa to the Senate for Tarapaca and Antofagasta. It supported the candidacy of Salvador Allende in the presidential election of 1970, but did not join the Popular Unity, although they supported it. Once elected Tarapaca did not assume government positions, but participated in social fronts. Following the coup d'état of September 11, 1973 decided to dissolve in exile. Many of its former militants then worked for the unity of Socialist Party.

It was rebuilt in 1983, with Silva Ulloa as General Secretary, participating in the Democratic Alliance and later becoming one of the founders of Concertación. Between 22 and 25 January 1990 it participated in the Congress of Unity Salvador Allende, returning to the Socialist Party.
