= Florencio Durán =

Chilean parliamentarian

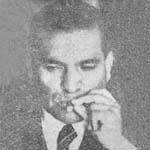

42nd President of the Senate of Chile
- In office 27 May 1941 – 23 May 1944
- Preceded by: Miguel Cruchaga Tocornal
- Succeeded by: Pedro Opaso

Member of the Senate
- In office 15 May 1937 – 15 May 1953
- Constituency: 8th Provincial Grouping

Member of the Chamber of Deputies
- In office 15 March 1930 – 15 May 1937
- Constituency: 8th Departamental Grouping

Personal details
- Born: 11 January 1893 Rancagua, Chile
- Died: 16 March 1978 (aged 85) Santiago, Chile
- Party: Radical Party
- Spouse: Delfina Rubio
- Children: Seven
- Education: University of Chile (LL.B)
- Profession: Lawyer

Florencio Durán Bernales (1893–1978) was a Chilean physician, lawyer, and politician.

As member of the Radical Party of Chile (PR) he served as President of the Senate of Chile from 1941 to 1944. He ran also as pre-candidate for the PR in 1942 but lost to Juan Antonio Ríos, who then won the elections.

== Family and early life ==
He was born in Rancagua on 11 January 1893. He was the son of Benito Durán and Elisa Bernales. Then, he married Delfina Rubio M., and the couple had seven children.

He completed his primary education at the Liceo de Rancagua and later at the Instituto Nacional in Santiago. He pursued higher education at the University of Chile, where he qualified as a physician and surgeon in 1917. His graduation thesis was titled Surgical Tuberculosis.

He worked as a physician for the Seguro Obrero and served for nine years as administrator of the San Juan de Dios Hospital of Rancagua, where he also held the position of director. He later became president of the Association of Hospital Physicians and served as a director of the Caja de Crédito Hipotecario.

== Political career ==
He was a member of the Radical Party of Chile.

In 1939, he served as second vice president of the party and later that same year as first vice president. In 1940, he became president of the Radical Party.

He also served as a municipal councillor (regidor) of the Rancagua.

== Other activities ==
He was editor and owner of the newspapers El Heraldo and La Provincia, published in Rancagua, as well as the newspaper La Voz, published in Colchagua. He contributed to scientific and literary journals and authored works on various topics.

At the time of his death, he was writing a book titled Mares, which remained unfinished.

He was a member and president of the Rotary Club of Santiago, founder and president of the Rotary Club of Rancagua, an honorary member of the Fire Department of Rancagua, and a director of the League of Poor Students.
