= Labor Directorate of Chile =

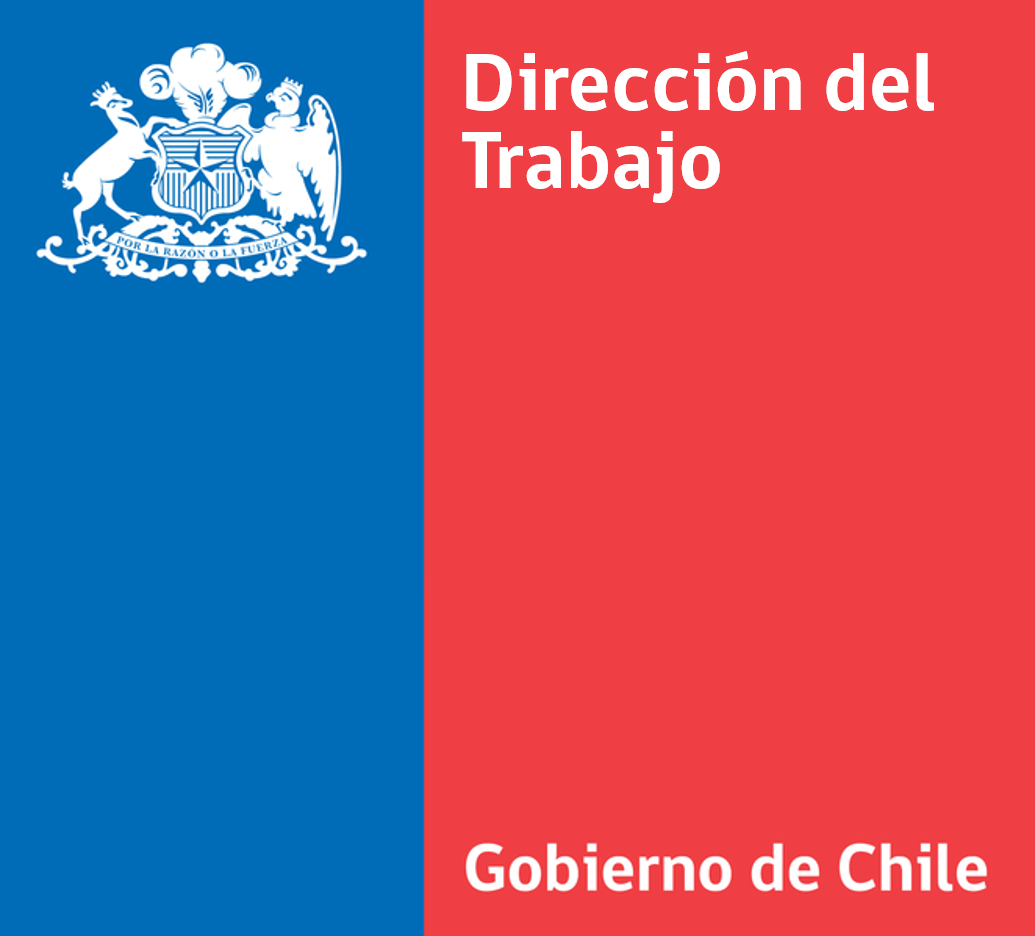
Logo of the Labor Directorate

The Labor Directorate of Chile (Spanish: Dirección del Trabajo de Chile), commonly referred to as the "labor inspection", is a Chilean decentralized public entity under the jurisdiction of the Ministry of Labor and Social Welfare. In accordance with its authority and obligations, it is tasked with supervising the labor relations and ensuring compliance with labor laws and regulations in Chile, as well as enforcing the labor rights in the country.

== History ==
On September 29, 1924, the General Directorate of Labor was established during the administration of Arturo Alessandri Palma. Throughout the 20th century, the organization has implemented a series of reforms and restructurings in response to the introduction of new legislation.

== Functions ==
One of its primary responsibilities is to facilitate labor mediation between employers and employees, guaranteeing the social rights of workers in Chile. In instances where conflicts arise concerning the employment relationship, parties may voluntarily request the assistance of an inspector who is tasked with assessing the situation prior to any potential escalation to a labor court.

An additional key responsibility of inspectors is to provide oversight, similar to that of a labor police in other countries. Article 19 of the Chilean Constitution affirms the principles of freedom of contract and the right to select employment that offers fair and appropriate remuneration. Consequently, this agency is tasked with the responsibility of ensuring adherence to these legal provisions. They possess the authority to impose fines on individuals or entities that violate labor laws. This includes breaches of employment contract clauses, non-compliance with legal and constitutional requirements during the hiring and dismissal processes, the inspection of workplace health and safety conditions, and the failure of employers to remit pension contributions for their employees, among other violations.
