= Joaquín Tuma =

Chilean politician (born 1941)

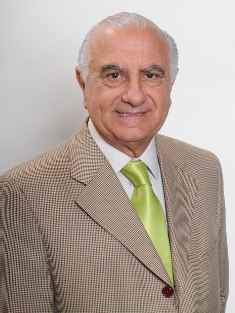

Member of the Chamber of Deputies
- In office 11 March 2010 – 11 March 2018
- Preceded by: Eugenio Tuma
- Succeeded by: District dissolved
- Constituency: 51st Circumscription

Councilman of Temuco
- In office 6 September 2004 – 6 September 2008

Personal details
- Born: 9 July 1941 (age 85) Temuco, Chile
- Party: Party for Democracy; Amarillos por Chile
- Spouse: Jessica Fagrés
- Children: Four
- Parent(s): Juan Tuma Masso; María Zedán
- Relatives: Eugenio Tuma (brother)
- Education: Pontifical Catholic University of Valparaíso (No degree); Pontifical Catholic University of Chile (LL.B)
- Occupation: Politician
- Profession: Lawyer

Joaquín Tuma Zedán (born 29 June 1941) is a Chilean politician who served as a parliamentarian from 2010 to 2018.

== Family and early life ==
Tuma was born on 9 July 1941 in Temuco. He is the son of Juan Tuma Masso and María Zedan Bulos. He is the brother of Eugenio Tuma, senator for the IX Region of La Araucanía.

He is married to Jéssica Fagres and is the father of four children.

=== Professional career ===
He completed his primary education at the Colegio de La Salle in Temuco and his secondary education at the same institution and at the Liceo Pablo Neruda in Temuco. In 1965, he enrolled in the School of Law at the Pontifical Catholic University of Valparaíso.

In 1967, he moved to Santiago and continued his law studies at the Pontifical Catholic University of Chile, where he obtained a Bachelor of Laws degree in 1969. In 1973, he received a scholarship from the International Labour Organization to study at the Professional Development Centre in Turin, Italy, specializing in export marketing.

Between 1971 and 1973, he served as manager of Sociedad de Construcciones y Operaciones Agropecuarias S.A. (Socoagro S.A.). From 1973 to 1976, he chaired the Association of Pig Breeders’ Cooperatives.

In 1981, he became general manager of Flamingo S.A., a position he held until 2009.

Alongside his business activities, between 1996 and 2005 he served as president of the Retail Chamber of Commerce of Temuco, and from 1999 to 2007 as director of CorpAraucanía, a non-profit organization dedicated to promoting productive activity and investment in the La Araucanía Region. In 2005, he became president of the Retail Confederation of La Araucanía, a position he held until being elected deputy.

On 9 October 2015, the Supreme Court of Chile granted him the title of lawyer.

== Political career ==
Regarding his political activity, in 1989 he promoted the founding of the Party for Democracy (PPD) in the La Araucanía Region. In 2007, he became regional vice president of the party.

Between 1993 and 1997, he served as regional councillor of La Araucanía and president of the Commission on Productive Development.

In the 2004 municipal elections, he was elected councillor of the Municipality of Temuco, where he served as president of the Housing and Urban Development Commission of the Municipal Council.
