= Confederation of Democracy =

Confederation of Democracy Confederación de la Democracia
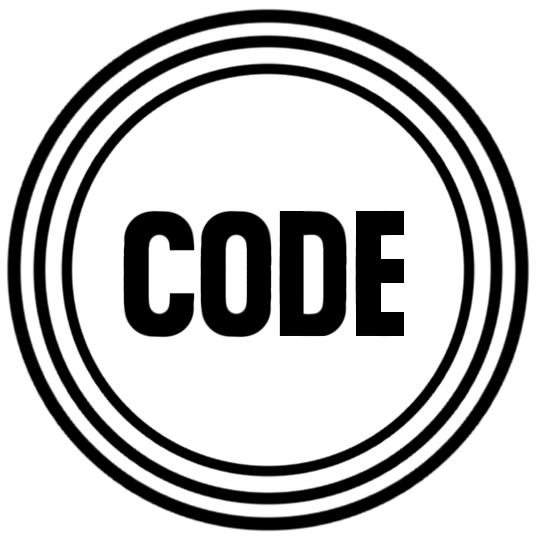
- Leader: Eduardo Frei Montalva; Sergio Onofre Jarpa
- Founded: July 6, 1972
- Legalised: October 6, 1972
- Dissolved: May 20, 1973
- Merger of: National Party; Radical Democracy; Christian Democratic Party; Radical Left Party; National Democratic Party
- Headquarters: Santiago
- Ideology: Christian democracy Social democracy Conservatism; Nationalism; Radicalism
- Political position: Center-right to right-wing Factions: Center-left
- Colours: Blue
- Deputies (1973): 87 / 150
- Senators (1973): 30 / 50

The Confederation of Democracy (Spanish: Confederación de la Democracia, CODE) was an electoral alliance of center-right Chilean political parties formed in July 1972. Its main purpose was to unite all the opposition parties of the Popular Unity government to face the parliamentary elections in March 1973. Its main objective was to optimize the collection of votes and seats, and accomplish the majority of Congress and thus obtain at least two thirds of the deputies.

== History ==
Between the opposition to the Popular Unity government, there were two opposing views. On the one hand the National Party (Spanish: Partido Nacional, PN) and the Radical Democracy (Spanish: Democracia Radical, DR) who saw the CODE as a way to definitively defeat the parties of the Popular Unity (Spanish: Unidad Popular, UP). The Christian Democratic Party (Spanish: Partido Demócrata Cristiano, PDC), together with the Radical Left Party (Spanish: Partido de Izquierda Radical, PIR) and the National Democratic Party (Spanish: Partido Democrático Nacional, PADENA), constituted for them a way of controlling the UP within the legal framework.

To do so, they took advantage of the opinion of the Electoral Court of June 6, 1972, which allowed the creation of electoral coalitions (or federated or confederate parties according to the legislation) in the elections of the National Congress of March 1973. This sentence repealed that of 1962 which prohibited general electoral pacts (only in the case of the election of senators since 1960 were allowed pacts, but these were also prohibited with another reform in 1962).

His first action, albeit unofficial, was in the January 1972 by-elections at Colchagua and O'Higgins Provinces and Linares Department, in which the CODE defeated the UP and gained a senator and a deputy.

This coalition was formed by two federations of parties, both also constituted on 6 July 1972:

- The Democratic Opposition Federation (Spanish: Federación de Oposición Democrática, FOD), made up of the Christian Democratic Party (PDC), the Radical Left Party (PIR) and the National Democratic Party (PADENA). Its first board was composed by Eric Campaña Barrios (president), René Abeliuk (secretary) and Enrique Rodríguez Ballesteros (treasurer). Its symbol was a rhombus with the emblems of the three federated parties: the symbol of the PDC in its apex superior, that of the PIR in the left vertex and that of PADENA in the right, and the initials of the federation in the center. It was legalized by the Direction of the Electoral Register on September 22, 1972.

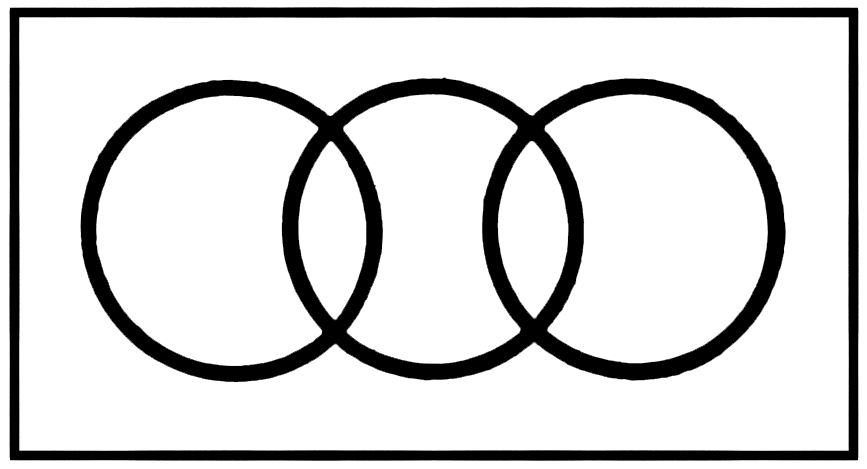
FNDR symbol.

- The National-Radical Democracy Federation (Spanish: Federación Nacional-Democracia Radical, FNDR), made up of the National Party (PN) and Radical Democracy (DR). Its first board was made up of Hernán Figueroa Anguita (president), Fernando Ochagavía Valdés (vice president), Carlos Reymond (secretary) and Diego Portales Frías (treasurer). Its symbol was a chain formed by three circles. It was legalized by the Direction of the Electoral Register on October 2, 1972.

The Confederation of Democracy was legalized by the Direction of the Electoral Register on October 6, 1972.

According to the results in the parliamentary elections of 1973 the CODE won the majority of the Chamber of Deputies, but did not obtain a two-thirds majority (100 deputies) that would have allowed him to block any constitutional reform and conduct an impeachment against President Allende. This last point was the objective of CODE.

After installing the new National Congress the CODE was dissolved, as said in their founding statute, which formally stated May 20, 1973 as the date of the formal dissolution. However, the Electoral Register legally dissolved the CODE on July 5. On August 8 the National-Radical Democracy Federation was also dissolved.

== Program ==
The CODE's goals and program have been based on:

- Liberty and labor rights
- Better freedom of speech and information
- Change of the Chilean Constitution
- Ending of the political violence and law and order policies
- Normalization of the political situation.

== Composition ==
Party	Main ideology
Christian Democratic Party	Christian democracy
National Party	Liberal conservatism
Radical Democracy	Classical liberalism
Radical Left Party	Social democracy
National Democratic Party	Populism

== Electoral results ==
Chamber of Deputies
Election year	# of overall votes	% of overall vote	# of overall seats won	+/–
1973	2,013,592 (#1)	55.49	87 / 150	New

Senate
Election year	# of overall votes	% of overall vote	# of overall seats won	+/–
1973	1,259,343 (#1)	57.25	14 / 25	New
