= José Peña Meza =

Chilean politician

Member of the Chamber of Deputies
- In office 11 March 1990 – 11 March 1994
- Preceded by: District created
- Succeeded by: Eugenio Tuma
- Constituency: Araucanía Region

Personal details
- Born: 5 October 1951 (age 74) Carahue, Chile
- Party: Radical Party
- Spouse: Patricia Durán
- Children: Three
- Education: University of Concepción
- Occupation: Politician

José Apolonio Peña Meza (born 5 October 1951) is a Chilean politician who served in the Chamber of Deputies of Chile.

== Early life and family ==
Peña Meza was born on 5 October 1951 in Carahue. He is the son of Juliana del Carmen Meza Beltrán and Diomedes Peña Díaz. In 1981, he married Patricia Durán Díaz. They have three children: José Manuel, José Esteban, and Consuelo Alejandra.

He completed his primary education at Escuela Granja No. 53 in Tranapuente, near Carahue, and his secondary education at the Normal School of Victoria. He later entered the Faculty of Law at the University of Concepción, graduating in 1978. He earned a degree in Legal Sciences with the thesis El delito de infanticidio en la legislación, doctrina y jurisprudencia and was sworn in as a lawyer on 26 January 1981.

Between 1973 and 1977, he worked as a teacher at School No. 11 in Concepción. From 1981 onward, he practiced law independently and served as substitute notary in Temuco.

In academia, he taught at the University of La Frontera in Temuco between 1994 and 1997, serving as professor of Political Science in the School of Sociology. From 2002, he taught at the School of Law of the Universidad Mayor in Temuco, lecturing in Political Theory, Constitutional Law, and Constitutional Statute of Political Power. As of February 2021, he continued teaching at Universidad Mayor, Temuco campus.

== Political career ==
He began his political activities in 1968 when he joined the Radical Youth. During his university years, he served as president of the Student Center until 1973 and, between 1970 and 1971, as vice president for the southern zone of the Federation of Normalist Students of Chile.

In 1982, he was appointed by the Court of Appeals of Temuco as substitute attorney of the Court of Letters of Carahue, serving until 1988, when he resigned to focus on his duties as regional president of his party. He also served as councilor of the Bar Association of the Ninth Region.

In the 1989 parliamentary elections, he was elected Deputy for District No. 51, Ninth Region (Carahue, Nueva Imperial, Saavedra, Teodoro Schmidt, Freire, and Pitrufquén), for the 1990–1994 term. He obtained the highest vote total in the district with 15,875 votes (25.06% of the validly cast ballots). In 1993, he ran again—this time in District No. 11—obtaining 11,153 votes (16.92%), but was not elected.

After completing his parliamentary term, he was appointed member of the Board of Directors of the University of La Frontera as representative of President Eduardo Frei Ruiz-Tagle, serving from 12 September 1994 until March 2000.

Between 2007 and 2015, he served as Notary and Conservator of Real Estate, Commerce, Mines, and Judicial Archivist of Traiguén. Since November 2015, he has served as Conservator of Real Estate and Judicial Archivist of Villarrica.
