= Silvia Araya =

Chilean intellectual and artist (1930–2021)

Silvia Araya OQ
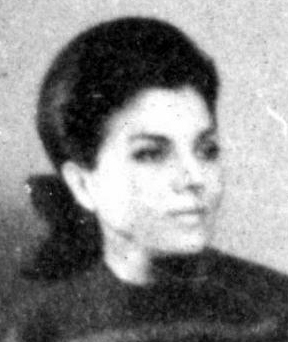
- circa 1973
- Born: Silvia Victoria Araya González; 6 May 1930; Santiago, Chile
- Died: 18 August 2021 (aged 91)
- Other name: Silvia Araya González
- Occupations: painter, art instructor, politician

Silvia Araya OQ (6 May 1930 – 18 August 2021) was a Chilean-born Canadian painter and art instructor. After founding the Chilean-Indian Institute of Culture, she joined the "Grupo Ancoa" and was a co-founder of the Museum of Art and Artisans of Linares, where she has sculptures and paintings in the permanent collection. In the 1970s, she became involved in politics and was elected to the Chamber of Deputies in 1973, representing the then Province of Coquimbo. After the coup d'état, she was imprisoned in the infamous Valparaíso prison, before being exiled to Canada in 1977. Locating in Quebec City, Araya established the Académie des beaux-arts Silvia Araya and taught for twenty-five years. She was honored as a knight of the National Order of Quebec in 2008 for her cultural contributions to the province.

== Early life ==
Silvia Victoria Araya González was born on 6 May 1930 in Santiago, Chile, to Julia González Jorquera and Manuel Araya Vargas. She completed her primary and secondary schooling at the Liceo No. 1 in Santiago and then enrolled in the fine arts program at the Secondary Institute of the University of Chile. She studied the influence of Chinese and Indian philosophy and their effects on Chilean folklore and popular art. While she was in school, she became involved in the leadership of the University of Chile Student Federation and in 1953 was elected to the federation's board to represent the fine arts department. After six years of study, she graduated from the University of Chile and then completed graduate studies in Mexico and Argentina, as well as making study-trips abroad to Europe.

== Career ==
When she finished her education, Araya collaborated with a group of intellectuals to establish the Chilean-Indian Institute of Culture for which they produced a radio program, India al habla (transl. India Speaks). She married Jorge Pinochet Lastra and the couple had five children. After living for several years in Santiago, the family moved to Linares where, in 1959, she was one of the founders of the Grupo Ancoa. The group was a cultural association of artists, musicians and intellectuals, which included Silvia Araya, Hugo Amigo, Julio Amigo, Dr. Miguel Cervantes, Bartolomé Cruces, Mario Dueñas, Temístocles Elgueta, Emilio González, Eliana Ibarra, Inge Linzt, Samuel Maldonado, Manuel Francisco Mesa Seco, Carlos Pinochet Lastra, Jorge Pinochet, Alberto Reyes Lapiedra and Carlos Sepúlveda López. In 1962, the group began working to organize an art museum holding performances and exhibits to raise funds. In 1966, Araya and other members of the group founded the Museum of Art and Artisans of Linares to showcase their works. The following year, an exhibition was hosted for the anniversary of the museum's founding which featured works by Araya, Armando Álvarez, María Esther de Barrientos, Sergio Monje Solar, and Pedro Olmos.

For fifteen years, Araya worked with the Grupo Ancoa, served as a director of the museum and exhibited her art works, participating in over thirty exhibitions. While also founding the Institute of Indo-Chilean culture. In 1970, she joined the Independent Popular Action (Spanish: Acción Popular Independiente, API) movement in Linares and served as the president of the party until 1971. From 1971 to 1973 Araya served as a member of the API's Political Commission, heading the national board of school assistance and scholarships. In 1973, she was elected to serve in the Chamber of Deputies of Chile and was appointed by president Salvador Allende as the only woman delegate to serve on the Permanent Commission of Latin American Integration and served as chair of the committee for Public Education. After the 1973 Chilean coup d'état, she was detained in Valparaíso prison before being exiled to Canada in 1977.

In 1978, Araya established the Académie des beaux-arts Silvia Araya in Quebec City, where she taught art classes for the next twenty-five years, retiring in 2003. In 1984, she opened a studio and art gallery in Les Éboulements, the first gallery in the village, which would later become an artists colony with many other galleries. Known for her portraiture, she painted images of Jean-Paul L'Allier, Gilles Lamontagne, and Jean Pelletier, having many paintings in private collections and adorning public spaces, such as those exhibited in the City Hall of Quebec City. After 1988, when Alain Decaux was appointed as Minister of the Francophonie and International Cultural Relations, Araya was honored by him with the "Alexandre Dumas" Prize for her "invaluable contributions to Quebec's culture". In 2008, she was awarded with Quebec's highest honor, when she was recognized as a knight in the National Order of Quebec. Other awards Silvia has won include the Rotary International Gold Medal and the Canadian House of Commons Distinction Award for her culturally significant contribution to Québec. In addition to having her work displayed accros Quebec, Araya has held more than sixty exhibitions, both in Canada and internationally.

== Death ==
Silvia Araya died on 18 August 2021, at the age of 91.

== Legacy ==
Two of Araya's sons, Christobal and Humberto Pinochet Araya have followed in their mother's footsteps, becoming award-winning painters in Quebec. She has both paintings and sculpture in the permanent collections of the Museum of Art and Artisans in Linares, Chile.
