= Miguel Cruchaga Tocornal =

Chilean politician

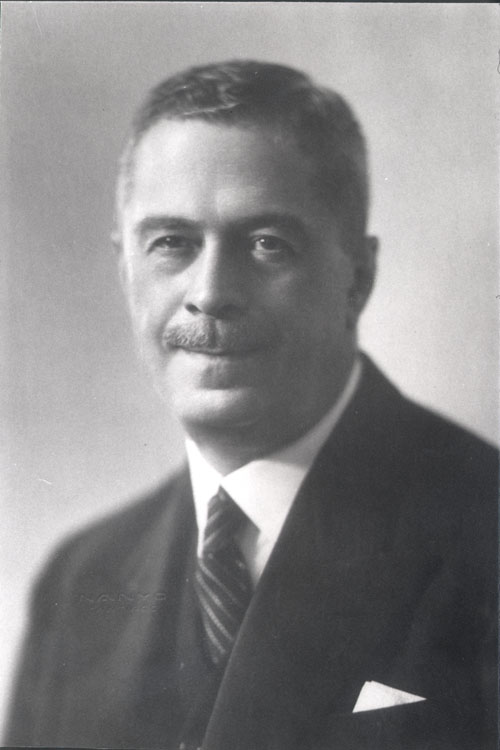

President of the Senate of Chile
- In office 24 May 1937 – 24 May 1941
- Preceded by: José Maza Fernández
- Succeeded by: Florencio Durán

Member of the Senate of Chile
- In office 15 May 1945 – 3 May 1949
- Succeeded by: Sergio Fernández Larraín
- Constituency: 5th Provincial Agrupation (O'Higgins and Colchagua)
- In office 15 May 1937 – 15 May 1945
- Constituency: 23rd Departamental Agrupation (Osorno and Río Negro)

Minister of Foreign Affairs
- In office 24 December 1932 – 16 February 1937
- President: Arturo Alessandri
- Preceded by: Jorge Matte Gormaz
- Succeeded by: José Gutiérrez Alliende

Minister of Interior
- In office 21 October 1905 – 19 March 1906
- President: Germán Riesco
- Preceded by: Juan Antonio Orrego

Minister of Finance
- In office 1 September 1903 – 10 January 1904
- President: Germán Riesco
- Preceded by: Manuel Salinas
- Succeeded by: Ramón Santelices

Member of the Chamber of Deputies
- In office 15 May 1903 – 15 May 1906
- Constituency: La Victoria and Melipilla
- In office 15 May 1900 – 15 May 1903

Personal details
- Born: 4 May 1869 Concepción, Chile
- Died: 3 May 1949 (aged 79) Santiago, Chile
- Party: Conservative Party
- Spouse: Elvira Matte Gormaz
- Children: None
- Relatives: Alberto Hurtado (nephew)
- Education: Sagrados Corazones (LL.B)
- Occupation: Politician
- Profession: Lawyer

Miguel Cruchaga Tocornal (born 4 May 1869 – 3 May 1949) was a Chilean politician and lawyer who served as President of the Senate of Chile. He died whilst incumbent, triggering the 1949 Chilean senatorial by-election.

A member of the Conservative Party, He served as a deputy representing the departments of La Victoria and Melipilla for two consecutive terms from 1900 to 1906. During this period, he also served as a minister of state, holding the Finance and Interior portfolios under President Germán Riesco between 1903 and 1906.

He later served as Minister of Foreign Affairs during the second administration of President Arturo Alessandri from 1932 to 1937. He subsequently served as a senator for the 1st Provincial Grouping of Tarapacá and Antofagasta from 1937 to 1945, and then for the 5th Provincial Grouping of O'Higgins and Colchagua from 1945 until his death in 1949.

== Early life ==
Cruchaga was born in Santiago, Chile, on 4 May 1869, the son of former deputy, economist, and writer Miguel Cruchaga Montt and María del Carmen Tocornal Vergara. His father died when he was very young, and Cruchaga subsequently helped his mother with the upbringing and education of his younger siblings. Through his sister Ana, he was an uncle of Jesuit priest Alberto Hurtado Cruchaga.

He received his secondary education at the Liceo Rafael Valentín Valdivieso and the Instituto Nacional in Santiago. He subsequently studied law at the law school then operated by the Sagrados Corazones in Valparaíso, while also working for the customs service. He qualified as a lawyer in 1889.

He married Elvira Matte Gormaz, a daughter of former deputy Eduardo Matte Pérez and Eloísa Gormaz Araos. The couple had no children.

== Political career ==
=== Early career ===
A member of the Conservative Party, Cruchaga began his public career in 1886 as secretary of the municipality of Viña del Mar.

He was practising law when the civil war of 1891 broke out, and joined the revolutionary forces with the rank of captain. He served as secretary to the Minister of Finance in the field and fought against the government of President José Manuel Balmaceda at the Battle of Concón and the Battle of Placilla. He attained the rank of major in the Army before leaving military service.

From 1891 to 1895, Cruchaga was entrusted with defending the state's legal interests in Santiago, and from 1895 to 1900 he served as a member of the Council for the Defense of the State. At the same time, he pursued an academic career, teaching international law at the Pontifical Catholic University of Chile and the University of Chile.

In 1902, he became a member of the Santiago Board of Charity and the Council of Public Instruction.

=== Diplomatic career ===
In 1908, Cruchaga was appointed Chile's envoy extraordinary and minister plenipotentiary to Argentina and Uruguay, serving until 1913. That year, he was appointed minister plenipotentiary to Germany and the Netherlands, remaining in those posts until 1920. He then served as minister to Brazil from 1920 to 1925, when he was elevated to the rank of ambassador.

The following year, Cruchaga was appointed Chilean ambassador to the United States. He also served as an agent of the government of Chile in matters relating to the Tacna and Arica arbitration in Washington, D.C. He remained at the embassy from 1926 until September 1927, when the new ambassador, Carlos G. Dávila, arrived. Cruchaga briefly returned to Chile, but his opposition to the government of Carlos Ibáñez del Campo led him to return to the United States as an exile. Following Ibáñez's fall in 1931, the government of Juan Esteban Montero reinstated him as ambassador in Washington, where he presided over mixed claims commissions dealing with disputes between the United States and Mexico, and between Germany, Spain, and the United States. In June 1932, he resigned as ambassador following the establishment of the Socialist Republic of Chile, and spent the remainder of the year in New York City.

=== Deputy ===
Cruchaga was first elected to the National Congress in the 1900 parliamentary election, when he won a seat in the Chamber of Deputies representing the departments of La Victoria and Melipilla for the 1900–1903 term. He served on the Permanent Foreign Relations Committee, was a substitute member of the Permanent Finance and Industry Committee, and was a member of the Conservative Commission during the 1901–1902 and 1902–1903 congressional recesses.

In the 1903 parliamentary election, he was re-elected for the 1903–1906 legislative term, serving on the Permanent Foreign Relations Committee and the Permanent Finance Committee.

=== Minister ===
On 1 September 1903, Cruchaga was appointed Minister of Finance in the administration of Liberal President Germán Riesco, serving until 10 January 1904. During the same administration, he served as Minister of the Interior from 21 October 1905 to 19 March 1906. While serving as interior minister, he was also acting Minister of Industry and Public Works from 25 to 26 December 1905.

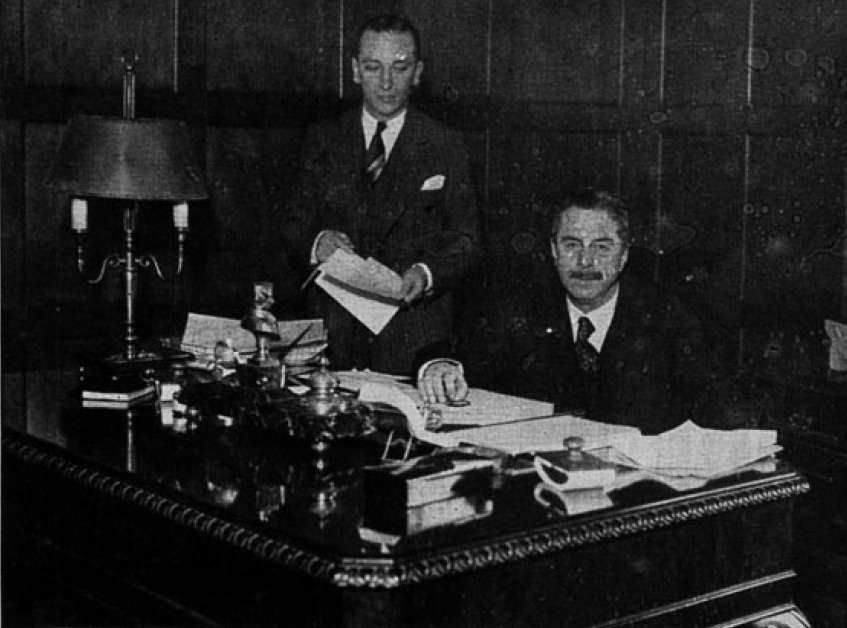
Miguel Cruchaga Tocornal as Minister of Foreign Affairs and Commerce (1936).

On 24 December 1932, at the beginning of the second administration of President Arturo Alessandri, Cruchaga was appointed Minister of Foreign Affairs and Commerce, a position he held until 16 February 1937. Concurrently, from 29 January to 26 August 1935, he served as acting Minister of Public Health. He also briefly served as acting Minister of the Interior from 4 to 14 February 1937.

During his tenure at the Ministry of the Interior, several laws bearing his signature were enacted, including legislation concerning workers' housing, the establishment of pari-mutuel betting at racecourses, the regulation of payments by the fiscal treasuries, a retirement fund for public employees, reform of the electoral law, the creation of a commission to review the credentials of members of the Chamber of Deputies, and the establishment of the government office responsible for stationery and revenue forms.

=== Senator ===
In the 1937 parliamentary election, Cruchaga was elected senator for the 1st Provincial Grouping of Tarapacá and Antofagasta for the 1937–1945 term. During his tenure, he served as President of the Senate from 24 May 1937 to 27 May 1941, when he became provisional president while a president was being elected for the new legislative period. He served on the Permanent Foreign Relations and Commerce Committee and the Permanent Internal Police and Regulations Committee.

In the 1945 parliamentary election, Cruchaga was re-elected to the Senate, this time representing the 5th Provincial Grouping of O'Higgins and Colchagua for the 1945–1953 term. During this term, he was one of the senators who introduced the bill that granted women the right to vote in Chile. He died on 3 May 1949, before completing his senatorial term. Sergio Fernández Larraín, who won the by-election held on 26 June, took his seat on 2 August 1949.
