= Julio Durán =

Chilean lawyer and politician

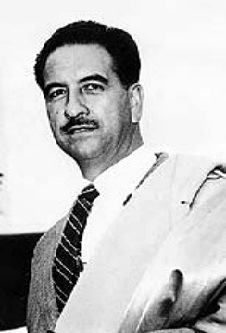

Senator of the Republic
- In office 4 March 1957 – 12 September 1973
- Constituency: Bío Bío, Malleco, Cautín

Deputy of the Republic
- In office 5 March 1945 – 3 March 1957

Personal details
- Born: Julio Antonio Gastón Durán Neumann; 20 March 1918; Santiago, Chile
- Died: 27 November 1990 (aged 72); Richmond, Virginia, United States
- Political party: Radical Party (1938–1969); Radical Democracy (1969–1973; 1989–1990)
- Spouse: María Gertrudis Salazar Navarro
- Children: 2
- Education: University of Chile, Law, 1942
- Profession: Lawyer; businessperson; politician

Julio Antonio Gastón Durán Neumann (20 March 1918 – 27 November 1990), was a Chilean lawyer, businessperson, politician and candidate during the 1964 Chilean presidential election.

== Early life and education ==
Julio Antonio Gastón Durán Neumann was born on 20 March 1918 in Santiago, to Julia Neumann Aravena and Domingo Antonio Durán Morales, a civil engineer, politician and member of the Radical Party. Durán's elder brother was the lawyer, businessperson, politician and national agricultural leader Domingo Durán.

Durán was educated at the Instituto Nacional. In 1944, Durán graduated from the University of Chile with a law degree.

== Career ==
Durán initially practised law in Santiago and Temuco.

Durán was a member of the Radical Democracy Party, which advocated ideas taken from Classical liberalism and Radicalism. Duran was a State Deputy (1945–1957) and State Senator (1957–1973).

In 1964, Durán ran against Eduardo Frei Montalva and Salvador Allende in the Chilean presidential election, and finished third.

From 1976 to 1981 Durán was the president of the Chilean Bar Association.

== Personal life ==
Durán was married to María Gertrudis Salazar Navarro, and together the couple had two children.
