= Eugenio Tuma =

Chilean politician (born 1945)

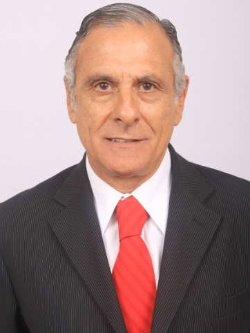
- Official portrait (2014)

Member of the Senate
- In office 11 March 2010 – 11 March 2018
- Preceded by: Guillermo Vásquez
- Succeeded by: Felipe Kast
- Constituency: 17th Circumscription (Araucanía Region)

Member of the Chamber of Deputies
- In office 11 March 1994 – 11 March 2010
- Preceded by: José Peña Meza
- Succeeded by: Joaquín Tuma
- Constituency: 51st District

Personal details
- Born: 29 July 1945 (age 81) Temuco, Chile
- Party: Social Democrat Party (Chile); Party for Democracy; Amarillos por Chile
- Spouse: Saima Zedán
- Children: Four
- Parent(s): Juan Tuma Masso; María Zedán
- Relatives: Joaquín Tuma (brother)
- Education: University of Chile (B.Sc)
- Occupation: Politician
- Profession: Economist

Eugenio Tuma Zedán (born 29 June 1945) is a Chilean politician who served as Senator and Deputy for his country.

He served as a Senator for the Araucanía Region (South) representing the Party for Democracy (PPD). Previously, he was a Member of the Chamber of Deputies for District No. 51 in the Araucanía Region, serving four consecutive terms between 1994 and 2006.

== Early life and education ==
Tuma was born in Temuco on 29 July 1945. He is the son of former deputy Juan Tuma Masso and María Zedan Bulos, and the brother of former deputy Joaquín Tuma Zedán. He is married to Samia Zeidán Zeidán and has four children.

He completed his education at Colegio La Salle of Temuco and at the Captain Ávalos Aviation School. He later studied economics at the University of Chile in Santiago, where he obtained a degree in Economic Sciences and qualified as a Commercial Engineer with a specialization in Business Administration. He also earned a degree as a Public Accountant and Auditor.

== Professional career ==
In 1971, Tuma began his professional career at the Corporation for the Promotion of Production (CORFO), serving as head of the Department of Calculation and Project Evaluation for the metal-mechanics industry. The following year, he became head of the Organization and Methods Department of the Textile Committee and later served as executive secretary of the Sectoral Committee for Leather and Footwear.

In 1990, he was elected chairman of the board of the Araucanía Sanitary Services Company (ESSAR), a position he held until 1993. In parallel, he founded, organized, and managed distribution companies and supermarket businesses in the Araucanía Region, particularly in the city of Temuco.

== Political career ==
Tuma participated in the founding of the Human Rights Committee of the Araucanía Region and, in 1986, joined the Political Committee of the opposition to the military regime in the region. The following year, he joined the Party for Democracy (PPD).

In December 1989, he ran as a candidate for the Chamber of Deputies in the Araucanía Region but was not elected. Between 1990 and 1992, he served as vice president of the PPD in the Araucanía Region and was a member of the party’s Central Directorate until 1994. In 1995, he was appointed head of the party’s parliamentary committee.

He was elected deputy for District No. 51 in the Araucanía Region—covering the municipalities of Carahue, Freire, Nueva Imperial, Pitrufquén, Saavedra, and Teodoro Schmidt—in four consecutive parliamentary elections between 1993 and 2005.

In the 2009 elections, Tuma was elected senator for Southern Araucanía representing the PPD, receiving 74,403 votes (29.07%).

On 29 November 2020, he participated in the primary elections of the Unidad Constituyente pact to select a candidate for Regional Governor of the Araucanía Region, obtaining 10,189 votes (57.48% of valid votes) and becoming the pact’s candidate. In the regional elections held on 15–16 May 2021, he obtained 92,083 votes (30.30%), advancing to the runoff election on 13 June 2021, where he received 50,840 votes (41.79%) but was not elected.

On 23 November 2021, Tuma announced his resignation from the Party for Democracy after 30 years of membership.

He later ran as an independent candidate for the Senate in the 11th Senatorial District (Araucanía Region) on the ticket of the Liberal Party within the Unidad por Chile pact in the parliamentary elections of 16 November 2025. He was not elected, receiving 32,530 votes (4.97%).
