= FRAP (Chile) =

Popular Action Front Frente de Acción Popular
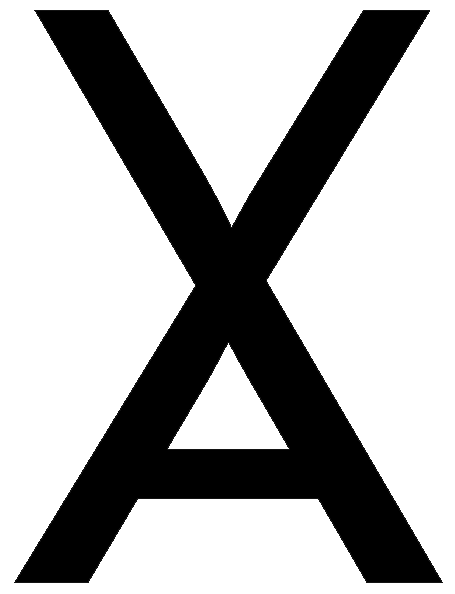
- Abbreviation: FRAP
- Founded: 28 February 1956
- Dissolved: 9 October 1969
- Ideology: Communism; Socialism; Social democracy Democratic socialism
- Political position: Left-wing

Party flag
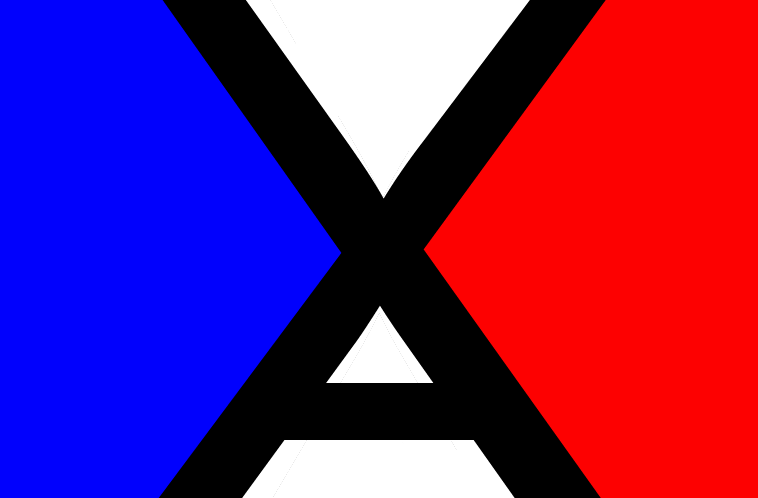

The FRAP (Spanish: Frente de Acción Popular, Popular Action Front) was a Chilean left-wing coalition of parties from 1956 to 1969. It presented twice a common candidate, Salvador Allende, for the 1958 and the 1964 presidential elections. Succeeding to the FRENAP formed the preceding year, the FRAP itself was succeeded by the Popular Unity coalition.

== Composition of the coalition ==
The FRAP succeeded to the FRENAP (Frente Nacional del Pueblo, People's National Front), formed the following year by a coalition of the Socialist Party (PS) and the Communist Party (PCCh). The new coalition, created on February 28, 1956, as a platform of movements struggling for an "anti-imperialist, anti-oligarch and anti-feudal program." Apart from the Socialist and the Communist parties, the FRAP included: the Popular Socialist Party (until its merger in 1957 with the PS); the People's Democratic Party (Partido Democrático del Pueblo), which merged in 1960 with the PS to form the PADENA (which in turn withdrew itself from the FRAP coalition in 1965); the Vanguardia Nacional del Pueblo (National Vanguard of the People), which had been created in 1958 from a merger of minor groups such as the Labour Party (1953) and others; and the Social Democrat, founded in 1965.

== Strategy ==
Despite their alliances, tensions separated the Socialists and the Communists. For the first one, the coalition was a "Workers' Front", formed exclusively of working classes' parties struggling to defend their interests, while for the latter, it was rather a "National Liberation Front," that is a legal means to accede to power through elections, in alliance with "bourgeois parties" such as the Radical Party and the Christian Democrat Party who would united in a common national emancipation program and social and political democratization program.

== See also ==
- Democratic Front of Chile (its right-wing opponent)
- Presidential Republic Era (1924–1973)
