= Labor rights in Chile =

In Chile, workers have the right to form and join unions without prior authorization, and approximately 10% of the total work force is unionized.

The law allows unions to conduct their activities without interference, and the government protects this right in practice. While employees in the private sector have the right to strike, the government regulates this right, and there are some restrictions. The law prohibits forced or compulsory labor, and there have been no reports that such practices occurred. The law restricts child labor, but it is a problem in the informal economy. There are reports that children are trafficked. The minimum wage is set by law and is subject to adjustment annually. The law sets the legal workweek at six days or 45 hours; the maximum workday length is 10 hours. The law establishes occupational safety and health standards.

Workers of companies declared "strategic enterprizes" (Spanish: empresas estratégicas) lack the right to strike. These include the Central Bank of Chile, various water and electric supply companies, kidney dialysis companies as well as many ferry operators in southern Chile.

== Right of association ==
Workers have the right to form and join unions without prior authorization, and approximately 10% of the total work force (estimated at 5.9 million) was unionized in more than 16,000 unions. Police and military personnel may not organize collectively. Members of unions were free to withdraw from union membership. The law prohibits closed union shops.

== Right to organize and bargain collectively ==
The law allows unions to conduct their activities without interference, and the government protected this right in practice. Temporary workers—those in agriculture and construction as well as port workers and entertainers—may form unions, but their right to collective bargaining is limited. Intercompany unions were permitted to bargain collectively only if the individual employers agreed to negotiate under such terms. Collective bargaining in the agricultural sector remained dependent on employers agreeing to negotiate.

While employees in the private sector have the right to strike, the government regulated this right, and there were some restrictions. The law permits replacement of striking workers, subject to the payment of a cash penalty that is distributed among the strikers.

Public employees do not enjoy the right to strike, although government teachers, municipal and health workers, and other government employees have gone on strike in the past. The law proscribes employees of 30 companies—largely providers of such essential services as water and electricity—from striking. It stipulates compulsory arbitration to resolve disputes in these companies. There was no provision for compulsory arbitration in the private sector. Strikes by agricultural workers during the harvest season were prohibited. Employers must show cause and pay severance benefits if they dismiss striking workers.

Labor laws applied in the duty-free zones; there are no export processing zones.

== Prohibition of forced or compulsory labor ==
The law prohibits forced or compulsory labor, and there were no reports that such practices occurred. The Labor Code does not specifically prohibit forced or compulsory labor by children, and child prostitution remained a problem.

== Prohibition of child labor ==
The law restricts child labor, but it was a problem in the informal economy. The law provides that children between the ages of 15 and 18 may work with the express permission of their parents or guardians, but they must attend school; 15-year-old children may perform only light work that does not require hard physical labor or constitute a threat to health and childhood development. Additional provisions in the law protect workers under age 18 by restricting the types of work open to them (for example, they may not work in nightclubs) and by establishing special conditions of work (they may not work more than eight hours in a day). The minimum age to work in an underground mine is 21; special regulations govern the ability of 18- to 21-year-olds to work at other types of mining sites.

Ministry of Labor inspectors enforced these regulations, and while compliance was good in the formal economy, many children were employed in the informal economy. From January through November, the Ministry of Labor imposed some form of sanctions in 93 cases involving violations of child labor laws. There were reports that children were trafficked (see Human trafficking in Chile). A 2004 survey by the Ministry of Labor and the International Labor Organization reported that in 2003 approximately 200,000 children between the ages of five and 17 worked, and 3 percent of all children and adolescents worked under unacceptable conditions. Among working children, those between the ages of five and 14 worked an average of 18.5 hours a week, and adolescents worked an average of 39.5 hours.

In August 2005, the SERVICIO NACIONAL DE MENORES (SENAME) released a report indicating that, as of September 2004, there were 1,123 cases of children and adolescents involved in the worst forms of child labor. Of this number, approximately 68 percent were boys; 75 percent were 15 years or older; and 66 percent did not attend school. Fifty-eight percent of the individuals were involved in hazardous activities such as mining or working with chemicals or toxins, 24 percent in commercial sexual exploitation, and 14 percent in illegal activities.

The government devoted adequate resources and oversight to child labor policies. SENAME, in coordination with labor inspectors, has a system for identifying and assisting children in abusive or dangerous situations. The Ministry of Labor convened regular meetings of a tripartite group (business-labor-government) to monitor progress in eradicating child labor. SENAME operated rehabilitation and reinsertion programs in 75 municipalities for exploited child workers. SENAME also implemented public educational programs to create awareness about child labor and its worst forms.

== Acceptable conditions of work ==
The minimum the Ministry of Labor, was responsible for effectively enforcing minimum wage and other labor laws and regulations.

The law sets the legal workweek at six days or 45 hours. The maximum workday length is 10 hours (including two hours of overtime pay), but positions such as caretakers and domestic servants are exempt. All workers enjoy at least one 24-hour rest period during the workweek, except for workers at high altitudes who may exchange a work-free day each week for several consecutive work-free days every two weeks. The law establishes fines for employers who compel workers to work in excess of 10 hours a day or do not provide adequate rest days. The government effectively enforced these standards.

The law establishes occupational safety and health standards, which were administered by the Ministries of Health and Labor and effectively enforced. Insurance mutual funds provide workers' compensation and occupational safety training for the private and public sectors. The law protects employment of workers who remove themselves from dangerous situations if labor inspectors from the Labor Directorate and occupational safety and health inspectors from the Chilean Safety Association determine conditions that endanger their health or safety exist. Authorities effectively enforced the standards and frequently imposed fines for workplace violations.
