= Independent Popular Action =

Independent Popular Action Acción Popular Independiente
- Founder: Rafael Tarud Siwady
- Founded: 27 April 1968
- Legalised: 27 September 1971
- Dissolved: 8 October 1973
- Headquarters: Santiago, Chile
- Newspaper: Api
- Ideology: Left-wing nationalism Populism
- Political position: Left-wing
- National affiliation: Popular Unity

The Independent Popular Action (Spanish: Acción Popular Independiente, API) was a Chilean political party, created on 27 April 1968, intended to be part of the Popular Unity and support the candidacy of Salvador Allende in the presidential election of 1970. Its main leader was Rafael Tarud.

In 1969, together with the Popular Unitary Action Movement, the Radical Party, the Socialist Party and the Communist Party, it was part of the political agreement called Popular Unity of Marxist ideals, to support the government of Salvador Allende. In the case of API, it was an organization that brought together left-wing independent elements, and less revolutionary than the MAPU and the MIR. The party joined the moderate wing of the UP, maintaining a critical position.

In the parliamentary elections of 1973 the party managed to elect two deputies: Silvia Araya González and Luis Osvaldo Escobar Astaburuaga.

The party was dissolved and banned by Decree Law No. 77 of October 8, 1973, signed by the military Junta. The same situation was repeated for all parties that made up the Popular Unity. API President Rafael Tarud, went into exile, and in 1987 was one of the founders of the Party for Democracy (PPD).
