= Traditionalist Conservative Party =

Traditionalist Conservative Party Partido Conservador Tradicionalista
- Founded: 1948
- Dissolved: 1953
- Preceded by: Conservative Party
- Merged into: United Conservative Party
- Headquarters: Santiago de Chile
- Ideology: Conservatism (Chile); Traditionalism; Anti-communism
- Political position: Right-wing
- Religion: Catholicism

The Traditionalist Conservative Party (Spanish: Partido Conservador Tradicionalista, PCT) was a right-wing political party in Chile founded in 1948 when the Conservative Party split into two factions. It participated in the coalition called National Concentration in the government of President Gabriel González Videla.

From 12 to 15 August 1950, the party held its first and only National Convention. On 15 December 1953 as a result of the merger with a faction of the Social Christian Conservative Party, it was renamed the United Conservative Party.

== Electoral results ==
- 1949 parliamentary election (21 deputies on a total of 147) — 13,8% of the votes
- 1953 parliamentary election (17 deputies on a total of 147) — 14,3% of the votes

== Presidential candidates ==
The following is a list of the presidential candidates supported by the Traditionalist Conservative Party. (Information gathered from the Archive of Chilean Elections).

- 1952: Arturo Matte (lost)
