= Chilean Social Democracy Party =

Chilean Social Democracy Party Partido Socialdemocracia Chilena
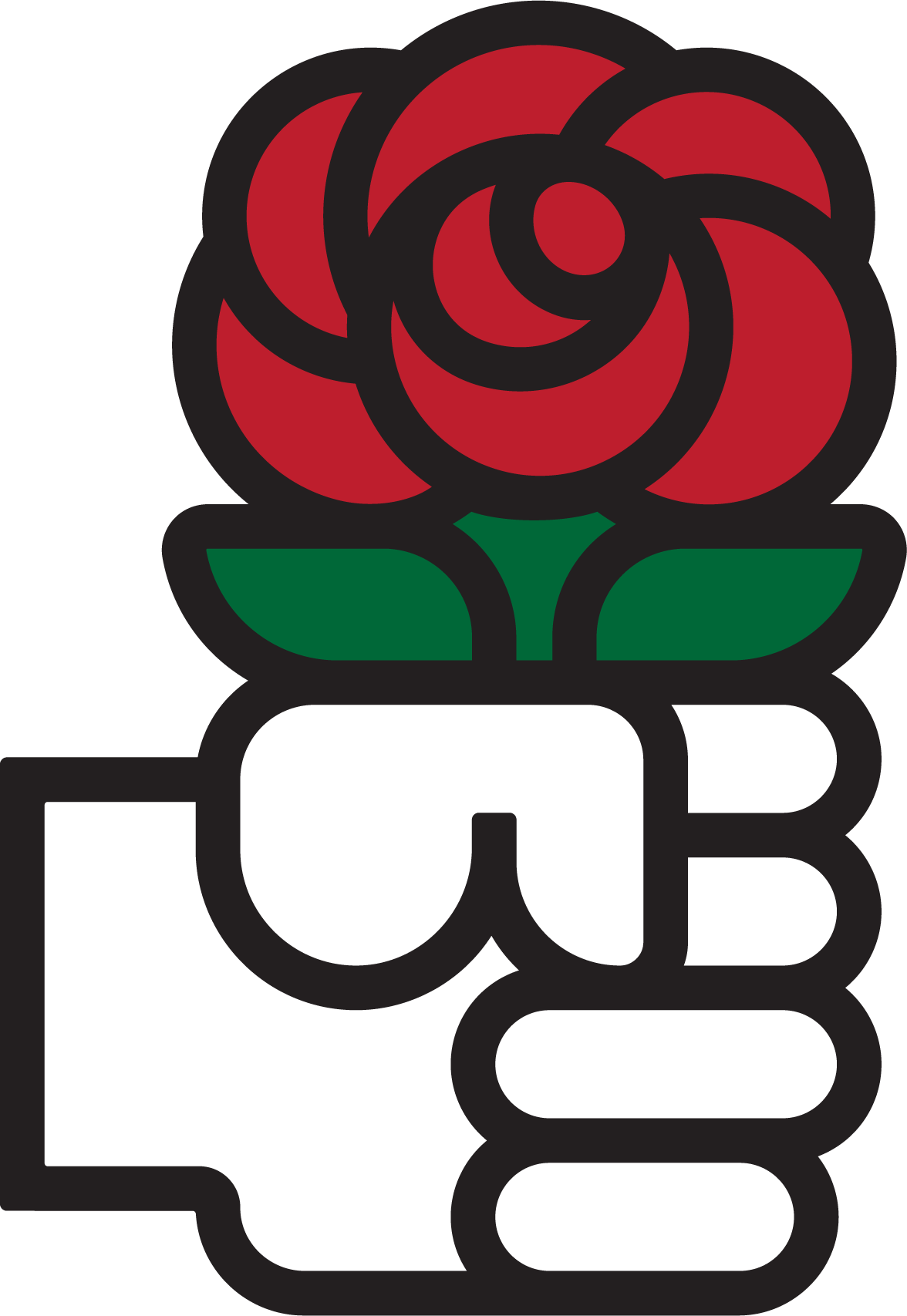
- Logo of the Chilean Social Democracy Party
- Founded: August 3, 1971
- Dissolved: August 18, 1994
- Split from: Radical Party
- Merged into: Social Democrat Radical Party
- Headquarters: Santiago
- Ideology: Radicalism; Social democracy Social liberalism
- Political position: Centre to centre-left
- National affiliation: UP (1971–72), CODE (1972–73), Concertación (1988–94)

The Chilean Social Democracy Party (Spanish: Partido Socialdemocracia Chilena (SDCH), until August 1973 Radical Left Party (Partido Izquierda Radical) was a Chilean political party of centre to centre-left orientation, formed by dissident Radicals in 1971.

== History ==
In its XXV Congress that took place from 31 July to 5 August 1971, the Radical Party confirmed the left-wing line it had taken already in 1967. The congress declared that the Radicals discard bourgeois democracy as an instrument of capitalist domination and the Radical Party is now a socialist party, that subscribes to class struggle and historical materialism. Disquieted by the Marxist influence, on 3 August, the Senators Bossay, Baltra, Acuña, Juliet and Aguirre and deputies Ibáñez, Magalhaes, Naudón, Basso, Clavel, Sharpe and Muñoz Barra left the Radical Party. They founded a new party of radicals with more moderate political views, though paradoxically called Partido Izquierda Radical – Party of Radical Left. The new party initially remained part of the Unidad Popular.

In March 1972, Allende and the Christian Democrats tried to forge a compromise. The Radical Left Party represented the UP coalition in negotiations. The radical minister of justice Manuel Sanhueza held talks with the Christian Democratic Party over regulations of nationalized firms, but ultimately failed, as the socialist minister of economy Pedro Vuskovic boycotted the negotiations and carried out legally dubious expropriations. As a result, the Radical Left quit the UP coalition.

The party then participated in the 1973 election within the centre-right opposition bloc CODE. In 1983, it was a founder of the Democratic Alliance. The party split in 1988. One faction called for a Yes vote on the referendum (for Pinochet), and formed a new ephemeral Chilean Social Democrat Party that soon merged with the Progressive Union of the Centrist Centre. The other faction called for a No vote and joined the opposition cartel Concertación de Partidos por la Democracia, and eventually merged with the Radical Party to form the Social Democrat Radical Party.

== Presidential candidates ==
The following is a list of the presidential candidates supported by the Party of Social Democracy. (Information gathered from the Archive of Chilean Elections).

- 1988 plebiscite: “No” (won)
- 1989: Patricio Aylwin (won)
- 1993: Eduardo Frei Ruiz-Tagle (won)
