= Popular Unity (Chile) =

Political alliance in Chile

Popular Unity Unidad Popular
- Founded: 9 October 1969
- Dissolved: 1981
- Preceded by: Popular Action Front
- Headquarters: Santiago
- Ideology: Socialism; Left-wing nationalism Factions; Democratic socialism Social democracy Radicalism; Christian socialism Communism; Marxism–Leninism; Liberation theology
- Political position: Left-wing; Factions; Centre-left to far-left
- Colors: Red
- Anthem: Venceremos

Popular Unity (Spanish: Unidad Popular, UP) was a left-wing political alliance in Chile that stood behind the successful candidacy of Salvador Allende for the 1970 Chilean presidential election.

== History ==
Successor to the FRAP coalition, Popular Unity originally comprised most of the Chilean Left: the Socialist Party, the Communist Party, the Radical Party, the Social Democrat Party, the Independent Popular Action and MAPU (Movimiento de Acción Popular Unitario). They were later joined in 1971 by the Christian Left and in 1972 by the MAPU Obrero Campesino (a splinter group). Popular Unity also initially included the moderate Party of the Radical Left, but in 1972 it joined the opposition (inside the Confederation of Democracy).

Popular Unity's leader, Salvador Allende, was a Marxist who co-founded Chile's Socialist Party. His slight plurality in the election resulted in his confirmation as president by the National Congress of Chile. The loose and conditional support from the Christian Democratic Party that made this confirmation possible soon disintegrated, as did centrism of any viable kind in an atmosphere of increasing political polarization. The Revolutionary Left Movement clashed with the conservative and establishment forces, while armed right-wing elements plotted to destabilize the government with support from the Nixon administration. The Unidad Popular coalition itself experienced political conflicts. Generally, the Communist Party, the Radical Party and later MAPU/OC advocated more cautious policies, whereas a part of the Socialist Party supported more radical changes and was often supported by MAPU and Christian Left.

The Pact of Popular Unity was signed on 26 December 1969 in Santiago by following representatives of political parties:

- Luis Corvalán, General Secretary of the Communist Party
- Aniceto Rodríguez, General Secretary of the Socialist Party
- Carlos Morales, President of the Radical Party
- Esteban Leyton, General Secretary of the Social Democratic Party
- Jaime Gazmuri, General Secretary of the Popular Unitary Action Movement
- Alfonso David Lebón, President of the Independent Popular Action

In a basic program adopted by Popular Unity on 17 December 1969, the alliance attacked the existing economic system in Chile, arguing that

What has failed in Chile is a system that doesn't respond to the needs of our time. Chile is a capitalist country, dependent on imperialism, dominated by sectors of the bourgeoisie structurally linked to foreign capital, who are unable to solve the country's fundamental problems, which stem precisely from their class privileges, which they will never voluntarily relinquish. Furthermore, as a consequence of the development of global capitalism, the subservience of the national monopoly bourgeoisie to imperialism is progressively increasing, and its role as junior partner of foreign capital is becoming increasingly more important. For a few, selling a piece of Chile every day is big business. Deciding for others is what they do every day. For the vast majority, however, selling their effort, intelligence, and work on a daily basis is a terrible business, and deciding their own destiny is a right that, to a large extent, they are still deprived of.

In August 1973 the Christian Democrats cooperated with the right-wing National Party in the congressional protest that set the stage for the Chilean coup of 1973, the effective end of the UP government and —for 17 years— of democracy in Chile.

== Allende's administration ==
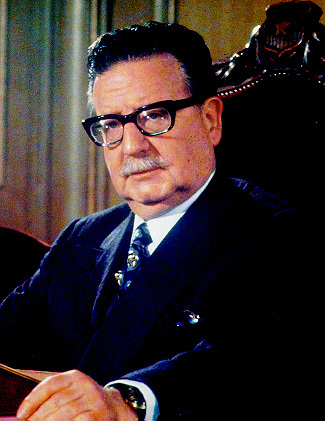
President Salvador Allende

Salvador Allende's election in 1970 represented several important developments internationally and domestically. He was the first democratically elected socialist leader in Latin America. In contrast with Fidel Castro's armed people's revolution, Allende proposed a peaceful and legal transition to socialism respecting the constitutional order. Popular Unity had the support of the plurality of Chileans, and initially this support continued to grow. Allende was elected with 36% of the popular vote in 1970. Five months into his presidency, his approval rating had grown to 49%. This was where his support peaked. Following severe inflation and food shortages Allende's popularity started to dip. With 44%., Popular Unity progressed in the 1973 legislative election but did not win the majority. The country was plunged into a political crisis on top of the economic crisis. The left-wing government and the right-wing opposition in Congress were unable to reach a compromise on economic policy. The political violence exploded during 1973 with a first attempted coup d'Etat on 29 June and the assassination of Arturo Araya Peeters, aide-de-camp of Allende, the 27 July. Finally, anti-socialist elements in the military, with support from US intelligence agencies, orchestrated a successful coup d'état on 11 September 1973. The leader of the coup, Augusto Pinochet, seized power and assassinated the leaders of the Popular Unity.

The UP's early economic success was short lived. Despite winning the presidential election, the legislative and judicial powers were still held by the opposition, making it difficult for the government to legislate. The United States, under the Nixon administration, prevented the renegotiation of national debt and placed an embargo on goods from nationalized companies. In response to these efforts, Allende expanded the money supply, and inflation skyrocketed. By the end of 1971, fiscal expenditure went up by over 70% in nominal terms, while between 1970 and 1973 government expenditures increased in global terms from 22,100 million escudos to 277,800 million escudos. Nominal expenditures rose in real terms by 35% in 1971 and by 10% in 1972, but fell by 17% in 1973. The government spent money instead of increasing taxes to pay for its programs; a course taken due to Congress rejecting tax reform proposals put forward by Popular Unity. Food shortages worsened as the embargo limited imports and hoarding in the black-market limited access to food. Inexpensive foodstuffs were, however, distributed to those in need by price control and supply committees.

The economy was also hit by a truck owner’s strike in October 1972 which was precipitated by a government plan to establish a state-run truck driver’s association. Shortages were exacerbated while inflation increased. The truck drivers were supported by various small business owners and self-employed workers, along with the opposition parties and the strike involved between 600,00 and 700,000 participants. Other strikes took place during Popular Unity’s term, including ones by Santiago shopkeepers, copper workers, and health professionals; the latter of which Allende tried without success to mediate towards the end of his presidency.

== Platform ==
The UP promoted the peaceful transition to socialism. This primarily involved the nationalizing of certain industries and agrarian reform. The UP intended to nationalize basic sources of wealth held by foreign companies and internal monopolies. This included mining of copper, nitrate, iodine, iron, and coal; the country's financial system, especially private banks and insurance companies; foreign trade; production and distribution of electricity; air, rail, and maritime transportation; all petroleum-based goods; iron, steel, cement, and paper. Agrarian reform would include the expropriation of latifundios, or large holdings of land. In addition to these policies, the UP promoted improved social security and public health, an improved and expanded housing sector, gender equality, the extension of the right to organize unions, fixed rents, free hospital treatment, universal student scholarships, tax reform, and the prevention of unjustified dismissals.

== Policies ==
Various social and economic reforms were carried out by the Popular Unity government during its time in office. A policy of nationalization was pursued, with the expropriation of the first company, a textile factory, announced on December 2, 1970. Others followed over the next several months, and the opposition congress unanimously approved a constitutional reform for the nationalization of copper and other resources, expropriating large foreign companies without compensation. Only the banks resisted Popular Unity's attempts to nationalize them. Spending on health, housing and social assistance was greatly increased, a mandatory minimum wage was set up, the right to social security was extended to all part-time workers, and free milk for certain groups was introduced. A redistributive economy strategy was carried out, which led to the share of domestic income allocated to labor rising by 11% in 1971. The building of a subway in Santiago was also rescheduled to ensure that blue collar neighbourhoods would be the first to benefit and rents were lowered. Legal recognition was bestowed upon the Central Confederation of Workers, a leading labor organization. Following a labor agreement, workers were provided with representational rights on the funding board of a Social Planning Ministry. More workers also became entitled to a particular holiday benefit. Earnings were sharply increased, while the real value of the minimum wage by 1973 was nearly twice as high as it was in 1970. Exemptions from taxation for those on lower incomes were raised, and improvements in social security benefits were made. Minimum old age and disability pensions, for instance, were increased to 100% of the level of the minimum industrial wage while family allowances for those living the countryside were made the same as for those living in cities. A decree was signed that provided for the extension of a Law on Workplace Accidents and Occupational Diseases to cover 2.5 million students, while a constitutional amendment made social security a fundamental right. A law was passed aimed at ensuring the continuation of mortgage operations for those experiencing unemployment, and illiterates were given the right to vote. A National Secretariat of Women was set up, which was aimed at supporting female workers through services such as communal laundries and food programs. Domestic employees were provided with legal status as workers, and an independent social security fund was set up to provide coverage for various groups such as the self-employed.

Various educational initiatives were carried out, including an anti-illiteracy campaign, free meals at school, free college education, new adult secondary schools, the provision of breakfasts to elementary school students, an expansion of scholarships for Mapuche children, a holiday camp programme, a law that aimed to provide help with transporting students in need to higher education centers, a National Board of Pre-Schools, which was intended to provide children under the age of five with educational and other services, and big increases in the distribution of various school supplies like free textbooks. Agreements were also made with the State Technical University and University of Chile that enabled many workers to access higher education. A state publishing house called Editora Nacional Quimantú was established, which printed books at low prices. A number of programs were launched to improve service provision for those on lower incomes, while tourism was encouraged, with 16 state resorts set up that provided workers with leisure, cultural activities, and sport. Extra maternity clinics, hospitals, and neighborhood health-centers were also constructed, a successful campaign aimed at preventing childhood diarrhea and bronchopneumonia was launched, and volunteers were sent to southern Chile to provide medical care to a neglected segment of society. Housing construction was encouraged, with tens of thousands of new homes built, and families living in camps or squatter settlements given priority. Social infrastructure projects were launched and sanitary units built while grassroots organizations involving residents were encouraged. A volunteer campaign (partly coordinated with student federations) was launched that focused on providing basic services like electricity and water in low-income areas together with urban improvement plans. An extension of housing loans to poor individuals was also carried out. Irrigation and urban sanitation programs were carried out and nutritional support for children and pregnant women was expanded, and the level of malnutrition amongst children fell. In addition, dental and medical services were expanded, and infant mortality fell by 90% during the first two years of Allende's presidency. In general terms, fiscal expenditure increased between 1971 and 1973 by 8.4%. This allocation of resources led to positive outcomes, including an increase in the quantity of milk delivered together with BCG, influenza and polio vaccinations.

A Land Reform program was initiated; which built on the previous land reform programme of Allende's predecessor Frei. During the Popular Unity’s time in office, roughly 100,000 peasant families became property owners as a result of land redistribution. Courses in bookkeeping, tractor driving and farming techniques were introduced, and the amount of credits provided to smallholders was greatly increased; with the number of beneficiaries increasing from nearly 39,000 in 1970 to over 90,000 in 1972. Loans were also provided to members of cooperatives, and interest rates on loans to farmers were reduced. The main beneficiaries of the Frei and Allende land reforms were the peasants already working the land. The process was similar to that of sharecropping, in which the owners of the land pay people to work the land. The peasants working the land keep a percentage of the profit, while the rest goes to the owner. The reform policies rarely addressed the small land holders, turning them against the Allende government. Although the UP did not gain full power of the government with Allende’s election, it did gain the administrative and economic ability to limit the power of business owners through expropriations and strengthen the urban working classes and rural peasantry. One large difference between Christian Democrat and Popular Unity governments was their reactions to tomas, or seizures of land by the peasants. Frei’s government would not expropriate any land that had been seized, but Allende accelerated expropriations. This led to a massive movement to seize land. In 1967, there were 9 seizures, but in 1971, there were 1,278. Half of these seizures occurred on farms below the land limit of expropriation. The government established peasant councils that were supposed to represent peasant interests. Their failure in doing this played a large role in Allende’s loss of favor among the peasantry. A series of programs, including pay equality, resulted in diminishing incentives to work, and productivity fell. More positively, the agrarian reform under Popular Unity resulted in a significant rise in the peasant standard of living, an increase in peasant political awareness and activity, and the expropriation of all latifundios. However, it was not as extensive, or as successful, as it was expected to be, and Allende lost their potential support.

== Composition (1969–1973) ==
Party	Main ideology
Socialist Party of Chile	Marxism, democratic socialism
Communist Party of Chile	Communism, Marxism–Leninism
Radical Party	Radicalism
Radical Left Party (1971–1972)	Social democracy
Social Democratic Party	Social democracy, Social liberalism
Popular Unitary Action Movement	Marxism, Liberation theology
MAPU Obrero Campesino	Christian socialism, Liberation theology
Christian Left Party of Chile	Christian socialism, Christian left
Independent Popular Action	Left-wing nationalism, Populism

== Electoral results ==
Chamber of Deputies
Election year	# of overall votes	% of overall vote	# of overall seats won	+/–
1973	1,605,170 (#2)	44.23	63 / 150	New

Senate
Election year	# of overall votes	% of overall vote	# of overall seats won	+/–
1973	940,512 (#2)	42.75	11 / 25	New

== Symbols ==
1969–1972

1972–1973

1973

== See also ==
- Popular Front (Chile)
- Democratic Alliance (Chile)
