= Social Democratic Party (Chile) =

Defunct political party in Chile

Social Democrat Party Partido Social Demócrata
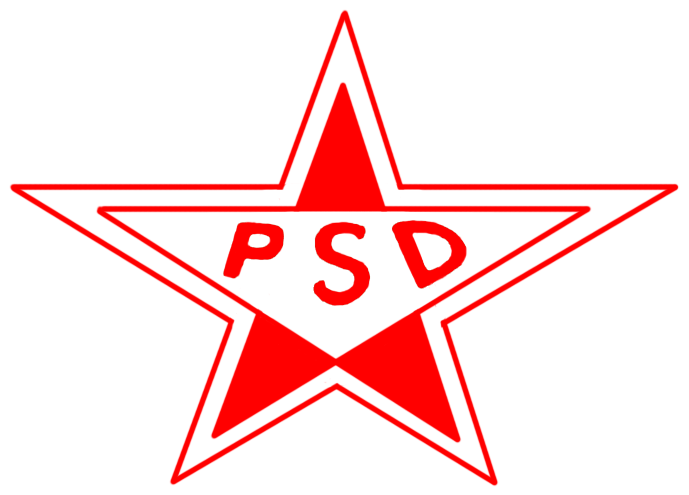
- Founded: 11 September 1967
- Dissolved: 11 August 1972
- Split from: National Democratic Party
- Merged into: Radical Party
- Headquarters: Santiago, Chile
- Ideology: Social liberalism Social democracy Progressivism
- Political position: Centre-left
- National affiliation: Popular Unity

The Social Democrat Party (Spanish: Partido Social Demócrata, PSD) was a political party of Chile founded on 11 September 1967 by the Senator Luis Fernando Luengo and the Deputy Patricio Hurtado Pereira.

== History ==
Luis Fernando Luengo was a member of the National Democratic Party and Patricio Hurtado, had renounced his membership in the Christian Democratic Party to create the Movement of National Rebellion (Spanish: Movimiento de Rebeldía Nacional, MORENA) in 1964. The party was one deputy and one senator. For the 1969 elections the party elected one senator but had no deputies. In the presidential elections of 1970 the party supported Salvador Allende and on 11 August 1972 the party was dissolved and its members moved to the Radical Party.

Among its leaders were Lautaro Ojeda, Plácido Contreras, Juan Tuma, Eugenio Tuma, Humberto Martones Morales, Enrique Martones Morales, Gabriel Luengo, Hernán Giles, Manuel Yáñez, the doctor Óscar Jiménez Pinochet, Uberlinda Lagos Reyes, Luis Urra Muena, Francisco González and Manuel González.
