= National Falange =

National Falange Falange Nacional
- Founded: 13 October 1935
- Dissolved: 28 July 1957
- Split from: Conservative Party
- Merged into: Christian Democratic Party
- Headquarters: Santiago de Chile
- Ideology: Catholic social teaching Progressive Christianity
- Political position: Centre

The National Falange (Spanish: Falange Nacional, FN) was a Chilean Christian political party that existed between 1935 and 1957. It was the basis of the Christian Democratic Party (PDC); still it is customary to use the expressions "Falange" and "Falangista" to refer to members and activities of the Christian Democrats and the same party, respectively.

== History ==
In 1935 a group of younger social-Christians split from the Conservative Party to form the National Falange. Despite its name this group was largely made up of progressive and reformist Catholics, and bore little resemblance to Spanish Falangism. In its early years it imitated elements of fascist movements with some of its members wearing uniforms and undergoing paramilitary training. With its progressive economic program (creating an alternative to capitalism, "redeeming" the proletariat) it was in open conflict with the Catholic high clergy who accused it of disrespecting the Church's leadership and siding with communists. Despite its aim to be a centrist alternative to the left and the right, and relatively great public attention, it never received more than 4 percent of the votes. Later it supported the administration of Juan Antonio Ríos (1942–46) and in 1957 merged with the Social Christian Conservative Party into the Christian Democratic Party. One of its former members, Eduardo Frei Montalva, became President of Chile in 1964. Other notable members include Radomiro Tomic and Bernardo Leighton.

== Presidential candidates ==
The following is a list of the presidential candidates supported by the National Falange. (Information gathered from the Archive of Chilean Elections).

- 1942: Juan Antonio Ríos (won)
- 1946: Eduardo Cruz-Coke (lost)
- 1952: Pedro Alfonso (lost)
