= People's Democratic Party (Chile) =

People's Democratic Party Partido Democrático del Pueblo
- Founded: 1948
- Dissolved: 1956
- Merged into: Democratic Party
- Headquarters: Santiago, Chile
- Ideology: Social liberalism Social democracy Populism

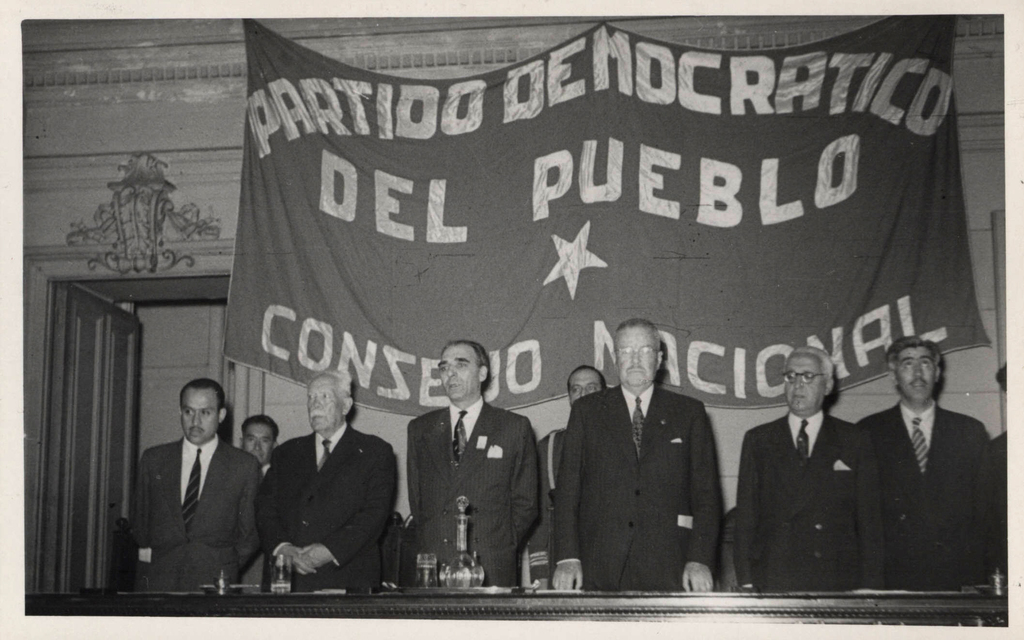
National Council of the People's Democratic Party.

The People's Democratic Party (Spanish: Partido Democrático del Pueblo) was a political party in Chile. It was founded through a split in the Democratic Party. PDP was part of the 1952 People's Alliance that supported Carlos Ibáñez del Campo in the 1952 presidential election. In 1956 the PDP joined the Popular Action Front (FRAP). In 1956 PDP merged again into the Democratic Party.
