= 1964 Chilean presidential election =

Election for the president of Chile

- 4 September 1964
- Registered: 2,915,121
- Turnout: 86.81% (▲3.31pp)
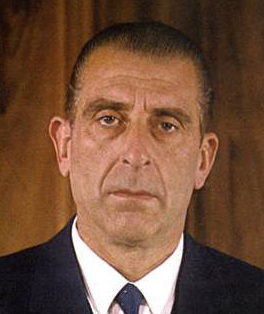

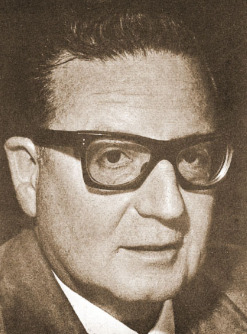
Nominee	Eduardo Frei Montalva	Salvador Allende
Party	PDC	Socialist
Popular vote	1,409,012	977,902
Percentage	56.09%	38.93%
- Results by commune
President before election
Jorge Alessandri
Independent
Elected President
Eduardo Frei Montalva
PDC

The 1964 Chilean presidential elections were held on 4 September. As the constitution prevented presidents from serving two consecutive terms, incumbent president Jorge Alessandri was ineligible. The result was a victory for Eduardo Frei Montalva of the Christian Democratic Party, who received 56% of the vote.

== Electoral system ==
The elections were held using the absolute majority system, under which a candidate had to receive over 50% of the popular vote to be elected. If no candidate received over 50% of the vote, both houses of the National Congress would come together to vote on the two candidates who received the most votes. This affected each candidate's strategy, as if nobody received a majority, it was tradition for Congress to elect the candidate who received the most votes, although this was not a constitutional requirement. In a television interview on 3 May Frei upheld this tradition, by stating that if no candidate earned a majority, Congress should elect the candidate who received the most votes.

== Campaign ==
A fundamental question of the election was whether to radically transform economic and political institutions or whether to reform them. The Christian Democrats supported further agrarian reform, which had begun under the Alessandri administration and exerting greater state control over the dominant copper industry. FRAP called for more drastic action, advocating the nationalization of copper, nitrate and iron mining, and eventually petroleum companies as well. For agricultural reform, Salvador Allende advocated further transformation, creating a new system based upon a mix of state, collective, and private farms, while urging that no more than 35% of the arable land would be collectivized.

Frei strongly advocated reform of politics, and in substance often differed little from FRAP's detailed proposals. But Frei took a more moderate tone, emphasizing a "Revolution in Liberty," which would transform Chilean society through democratic rather than totalitarian means, implying that Allende's election would lead to a dictatorship. This was part of a major anti-communist publicity campaign by the PDC, which was assisted substantially by the United States, to scare voters away from Allende.

== Conduct ==
The elections took place during the Cold War, at a time when the United States was especially alarmed by the success of communist movements in Latin America. In August the Alessandri government bowed under pressure from the U.S. and broke off relations with Cuba, following the 1959 revolution. The move was opposed by FRAP, but had little direct effect on the presidential campaign. For the White House, State Department and Central Intelligence Agency the democratic election of a Marxist candidate in the Western hemisphere would be a "shocking blow to the hegemonic position of the United States."

The Church Committee of the US Senate revealed in 1975 that the CIA interfered substantially with the elections to prevent Allende winning. The CIA secretly funded more than half of Frei's campaign and supported an array of pro-Christian Democratic groups. Two other political parties were funded as well in an attempt to spread the vote. The CIA's assistance to Frei took the form of polling, voter registration and get out the vote drives, in addition to covert propaganda.

While the exact total of funds provided to Allende by the Soviets is unknown, records indicate he received $200,000 in 1963 and $275,000 in 1965. It was also believed by CIA Director John McCone that the Cuban government had given Allende up to $1 million, but there are no records proving this amount was paid by Cuba. In total the CIA spent $3 million in the 1964 elections, more money than Lyndon B. Johnson spent on his 1964 presidential campaign.

== Results ==
Candidate	Party	Votes	%
Eduardo Frei Montalva	Christian Democratic Party	1,409,012	56.09
Salvador Allende	Socialist Party	977,902	38.93
Julio Durán	Radical Party	125,233	4.99
Total		2,512,147	100.00
Valid votes		2,512,147	99.27
Invalid/blank votes		18,550	0.73
Total votes		2,530,697	100.00
Registered voters/turnout		2,915,121	86.81
Source: Nohlen
