= Social Christian Conservative Party =

Social Christian Conservative Party Partido Conservador Social Cristiano
- Abbreviation: PCSC
- Leader: Eduardo Cruz-Coke
- Founded: 1948
- Dissolved: 28 July 1957
- Split from: Conservative Party
- Merged into: Christian Democratic Party
- Headquarters: Santiago
- Ideology: Christian democracy; Christian humanism
- Political position: Centre

The Social Christian Conservative Party (Spanish: Partido Conservador Social Cristiano, PCSC) was a centrist and Christian democratic political party in Chile.

It was founded in 1949 when the Conservative Party split into two factions. For electoral purposes, one of the factions was named the Social Christian Conservative Party (the other being called the Traditionalist Conservative Party). Some of the Social Christian Conservatives later returned to form in together with the 'Traditionals' the United Conservative Party (1953), whereas others participated in the Social Christian Federation with the National Falange from 1955 to 1957. In July 1957 the Social Christian Conservative Party merged with the Chilean National Falange to form the Christian Democratic Party of Chile.

== Presidential candidates ==
The following is a list of the presidential candidates supported by the Social Christian Conservative Party. (Information gathered from the Archive of Chilean Elections).

- 1952: Pedro Alfonso (lost)

== Election results ==
Year (number of all deputies)	Number of deputies	Votes received	Percentage
1949 (147)	31	98.221	21,1
1953 (147)	2	33.332	4,3
1957 (147)	2	33.654	3,8

Source: Cruz-Coke 1984

== Bibliography ==
- Cruz-Coke, Ricardo. 1984. Historia electoral de Chile. 1925-1973. Editorial Jurídica de Chile. Santiago
- Pereira, Teresa. 1994. El Partido Conservador: 1930-1965, ideas, figuras y actitudes. Editorial Universitaria. Santiago de Chile.
- Sanfuentes Carrión, Marcial. 1957. El Partido Conservador. Editorial Universitaria. Santiago
