= August 1924 =

Month of 1924

<<	August 1924					>>
Su	Mo	Tu	We	Th	Fr	Sa
					1	2
3	4	5	6	7	8	9
10	11	12	13	14	15	16
17	18	19	20	21	22	23
24	25	26	27	28	29	30
31

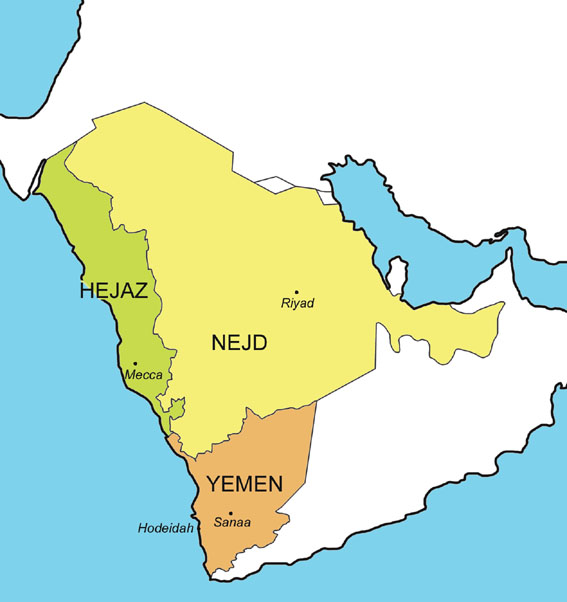
August 29, 1924: On the Arabian Peninsula, Nejd, led by the House of Saud, launches attack on neighboring Hejaz

Flags of Nejd and Hejaz

The following events occurred in August 1924:

== August 1, 1924 (Friday) ==
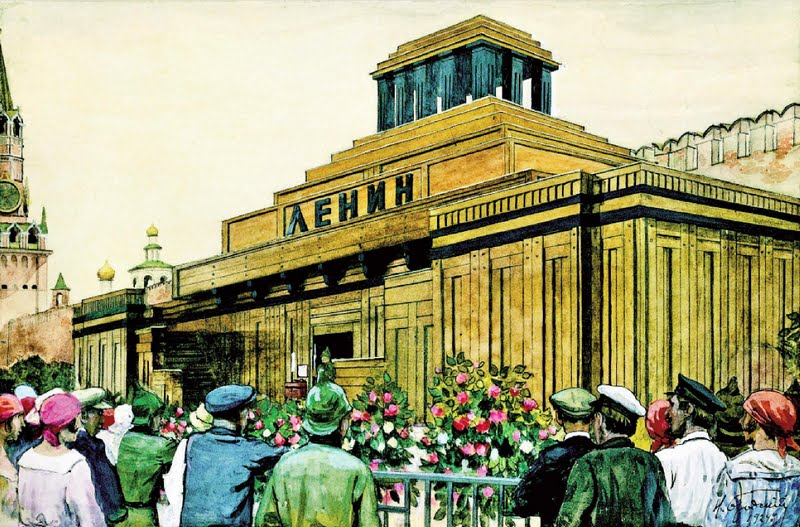
Lenin's second mausoleum

- A larger, more elaborate housing for Lenin's Mausoleum, built from wood, was opened to the public in Moscow. Previously, a temporary structure had housed Lenin's body. The new structure would serve as Lenin's resting place until the opening of the permanent mausoleum in October 1930.
- A boiler fire on the French battleship Courbet killed three people and injured 10 others.
- Koshien Stadium opened near Kobe, Japan.
- Born:
  - Abdullah bin Abdulaziz Al Saud, King of Saudi Arabia from 2005 to 2015; in Riyadh (d. 2015)
  - Michael Stewart, American playwright, winner of the Tony Award for Best Book of a Musical in 1964 for Hello, Dolly!; in New York City (d. 1987)
  - Georges Charpak, Polish-born French physicist and 1992 Nobel Prize in Physics laureate for his development of particle detectors and invention of the multiwire proportional chamber; in Dąbrowica (now Durbrovytsia in Ukraine) (d. 2010)
  - John Clive Ward, British-born Australian physicist who made significant contributions to quantum field theory and quantum electrodynamics, and for whom the Ward–Takahashi identity is named; in East Ham, London (d. 2000)
  - Åke W. Sjöberg, Swedish expert on Assyriology, specialist in Sumerian literature; in Sala (d. 2014)

== August 2, 1924 (Saturday) ==
- Another entrant in the first round-the-world flight attempt dropped out of the race as, the airplane Boston was forced to make an emergency landing in the Atlantic Ocean and sank while being towed for repairs. The crew was rescued, but only two airplanes remained in the race.
- The Allied Powers agreed in principle to the Dawes Plan and invited Germany to the London conference.
- The city of Boca Raton, Florida, was incorporated, initially with the name "Bocaratone". The name would be changed to Boca Raton on May 26, 1925.
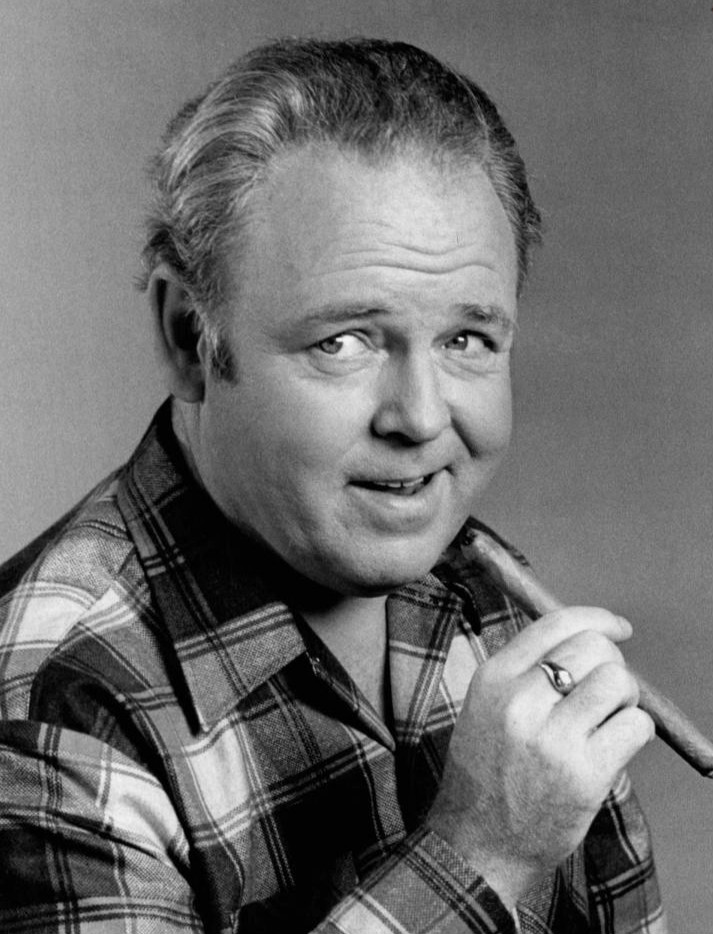
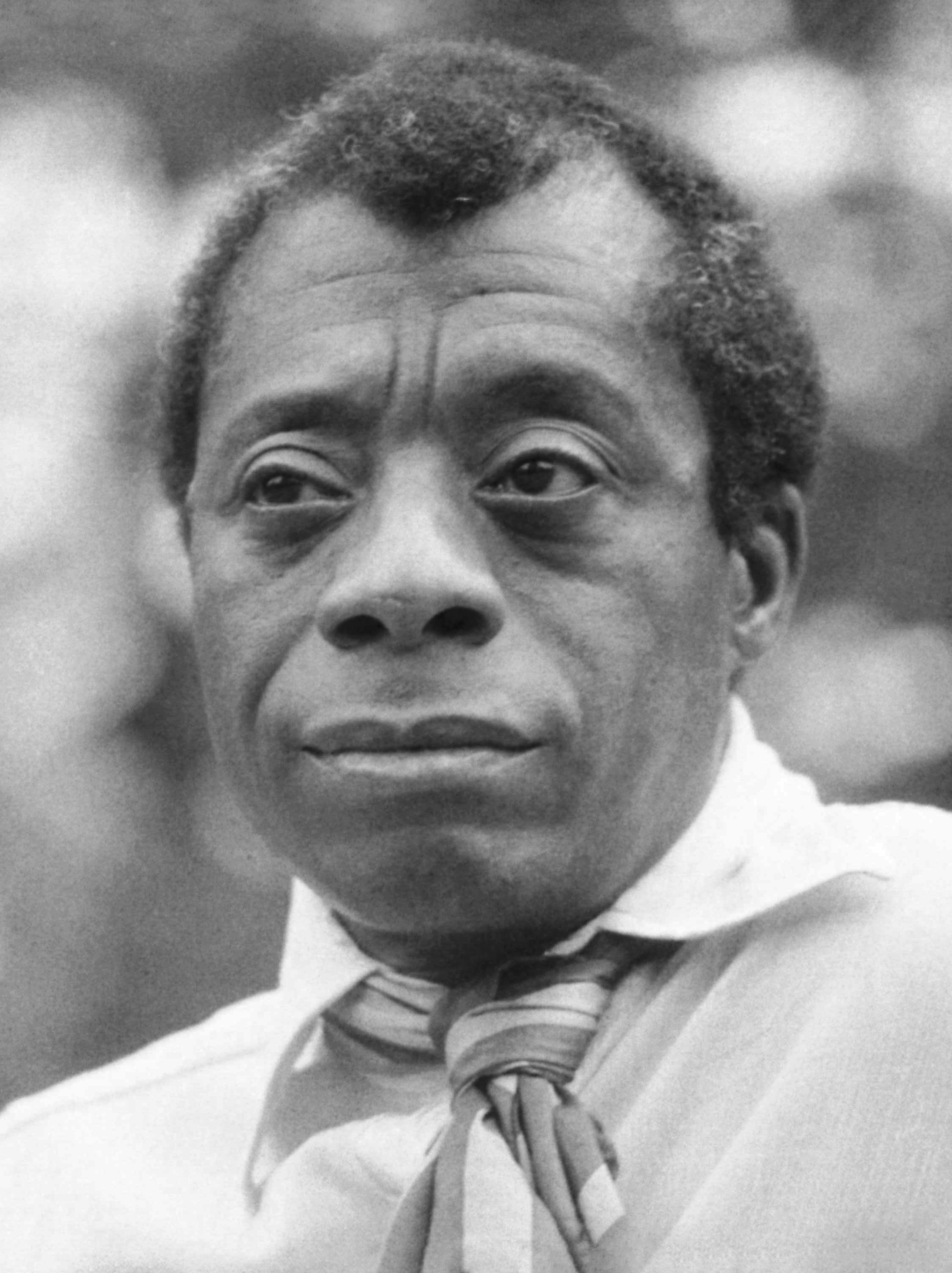
Carroll O'Connor and James Baldwin
- Born:
  - Carroll O'Connor (John Carroll O'Connor), American TV actor known for portraying Queens resident Archie Bunker in the situation comedy All in the Family, and as Mississippi police chief Bill Gillespie in the TV drama In the Heat of the Night; winner of four Emmy Awards for outstanding lead actor in a comedy series, and one Emmy for outstanding lead actor in a drama series; in Manhattan, New York City (d. 2001)
  - James Baldwin, American novelist, non-fiction author and playwright known for the novel Go Tell It on the Mountain (1953), and the book Notes of a Native Son (1955); in Harlem, New York City (d. 1987)
  - Alan Abel, American hoaxster known for his pranks that fooled The New York Times into publishing his obituary, and The Today Show into a report on a fake organization to clothe all unclothed animals; in Zanesville, Ohio (d. 2018)
  - Berty Gunathilake, Sri Lankan actor and comedian on film and TV; in Ampitiya, British Ceylon (d. 2022)
  - William D. Halyburton Jr., U.S. Navy hospital corpsman and posthumous recipient of the Medal of Honor for his heroism during the Battle of Okinawa; in Canton, North Carolina. (killed in action, 1945) The U.S. Navy frigate USS Halyburton is named in his honor.

== August 3, 1924 (Sunday) ==
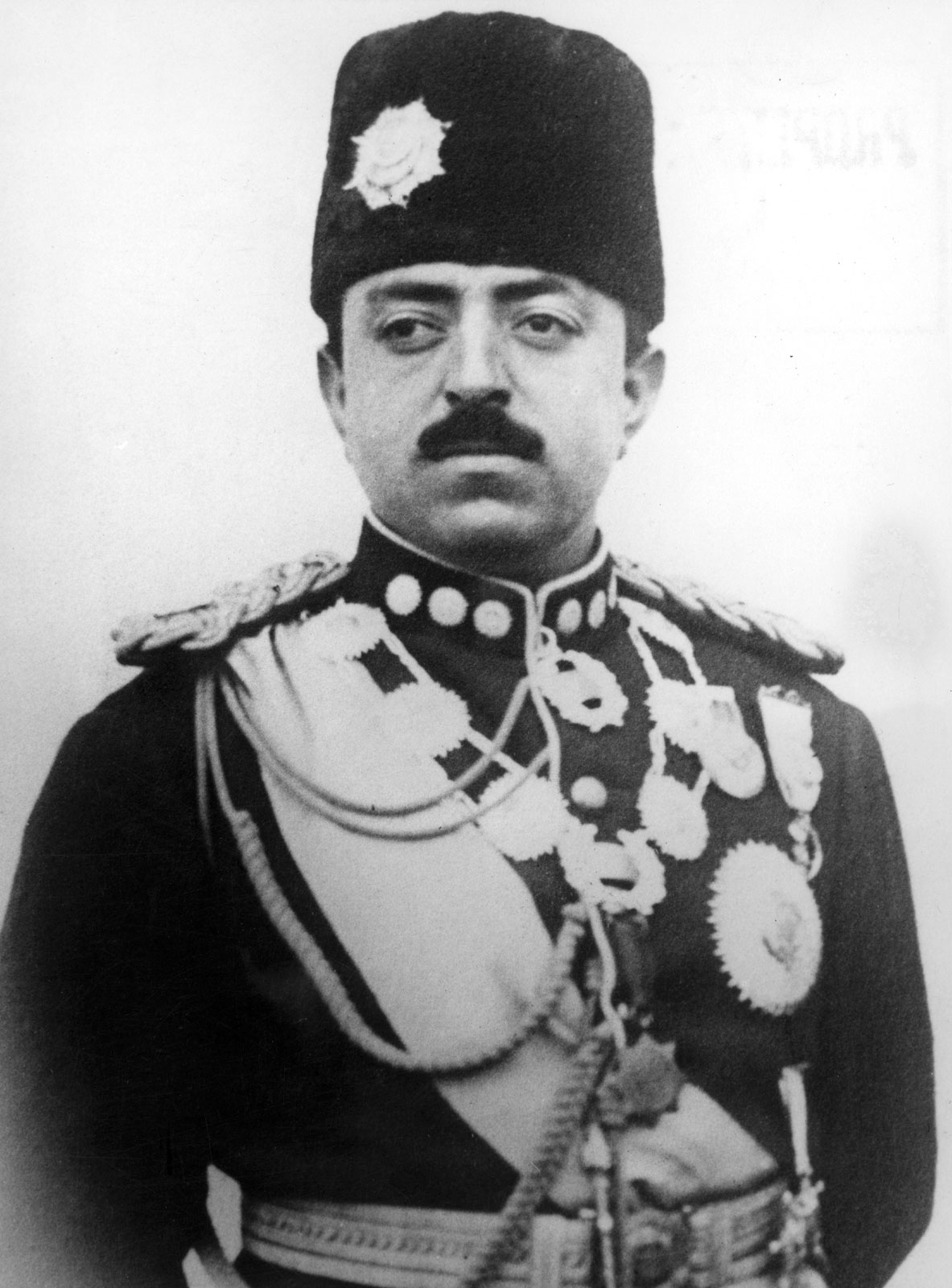
King Amanullah of Afghanistan

- Amanullah Khan, King of Afghanistan, declared a jihad war against six tribes who had commenced the Khost rebellion, led by Abd-al Karim in southeastern Afghanistan.
- Ja'far al-Askari resigned as Prime Minister of Iraq after the new nation's Constituent Assembly voted to ratify the Anglo-Iraqi Treaty approving the terms of the Mandate for Mesopotamia and making Iraq a British protectorate.
- On the tenth anniversary of its declaration of war against France, Germany observed its first memorial day, with a ceremony outside the Reichstag and two minutes of silence at noon. Communists disrupted the moment of silence, and police moved in with their clubs to restore order.
- Berlin Jews held a separate service for Jewish soldiers, as a Jewish preacher was forbidden from delivering a prayer in the Reichstag ceremony.
- A group of 150 Soviet troops crossed the border into Poland and attacked the town of Stołpce (now Stowbtsy in Belarus) in a mission to free two jailed members of the Communist Party of Western Belarus, who had been seeking to reclaim territory lost in the Polish-Soviet War in 1921. Seven policemen in Stołpce were killed and three wounded, but the attackers failed to free the two prisoners.
- Giuseppe Campari of Italy won the French Grand Prix, driving an Alfa Romeo P2 and finishing first among 22 drivers, more than one minute ahead of Albert Divo of France.
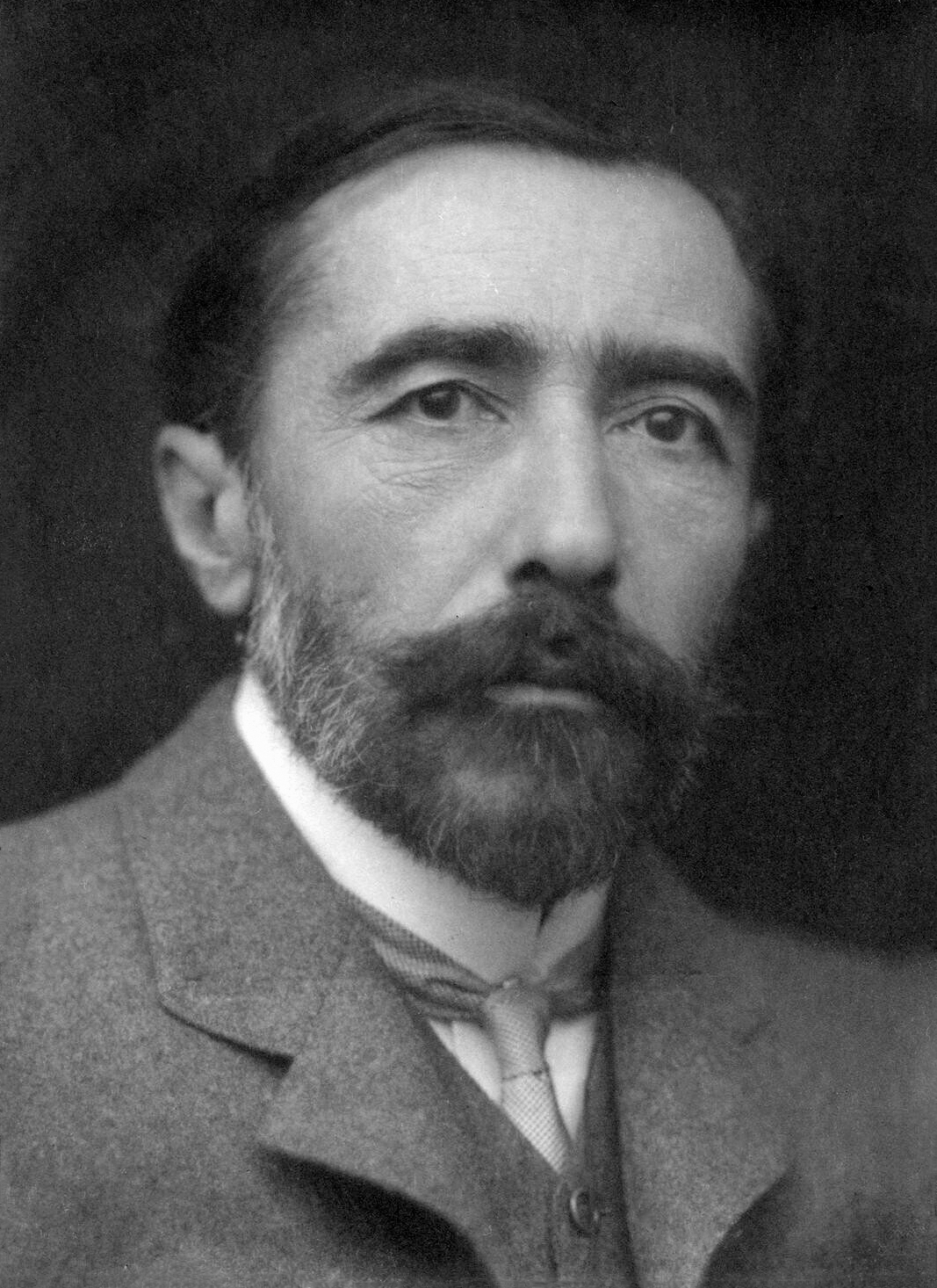
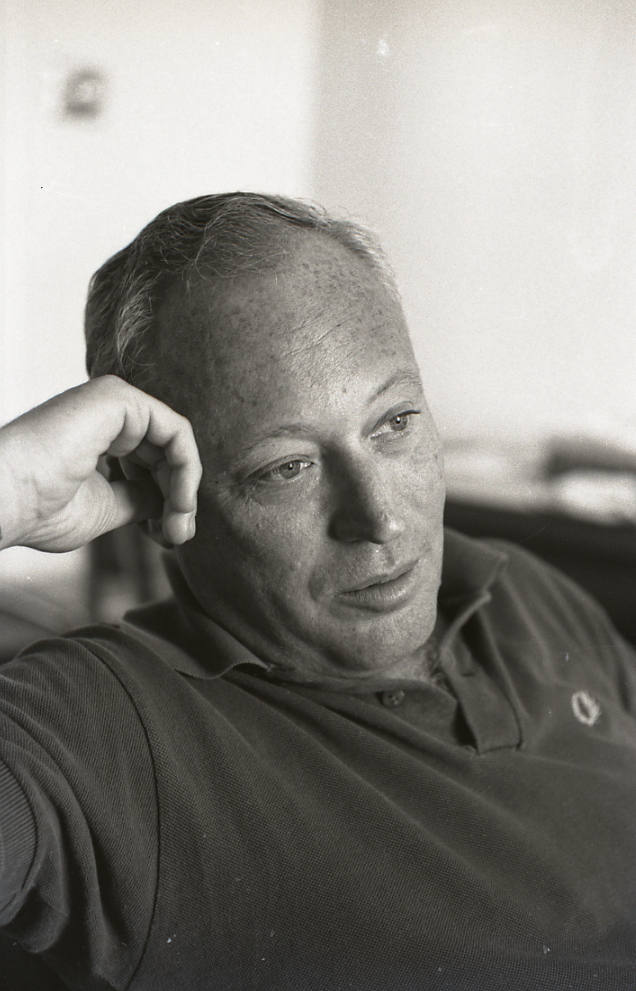
Joseph Conrad (d.8/3/1924), Leon Uris (b.8/3/1924)
- Born:
  - Leon Uris, U.S. novelist known for Exodus; in Baltimore (d. 2003)
  - Connie Converse, American songwriter and singer; in Laconia, New Hampshire (disappeared, 1974)
- Died: Joseph Conrad (pen name for Józef Konrad Korzeniowski), 66, Polish-born British novelist known for Lord Jim and other works

== August 4, 1924 (Monday) ==
- The first Women's International and British Games, also called the "Women's Olympiad", was held in London with women from six European nations (Belgium, Czechoslovakia, France, Italy, Switzerland at the UK) competing. Track and field athletics events at the Summer Olympics had been limited to men only. The events staged were the 100-yard dash, races at 250 metres and 1000 metres, two relay races (4 x 110 yards and 4 x 220 yards), hurdling (120 yards), racewalking (1000 metres), and competition in the high jump, long jump, discus throw, shot put and javelin. Exhibition events (which including women from the U.S. and Canada) were held for in cycling (two-thirds of a mile bicycle sprint) netball, and gymnastics.
- Jamaican-born political leader Marcus Garvey was indicted by a grand jury for filing an allegedly fraudulent income tax return for 1921.
- The British flying team of navigator Archibald Stuart-MacLaren, pilot W. N. Plenderleith, and flight engineer Sergeant W. H. Andrews ended their round-the-world flight attempt when their amphibious plane had to make a forced landing in the Bering Sea and was badly damaged. They were rescued from Bering Island by the Royal Navy ship HMCS Thiepval.

== August 5, 1924 (Tuesday) ==
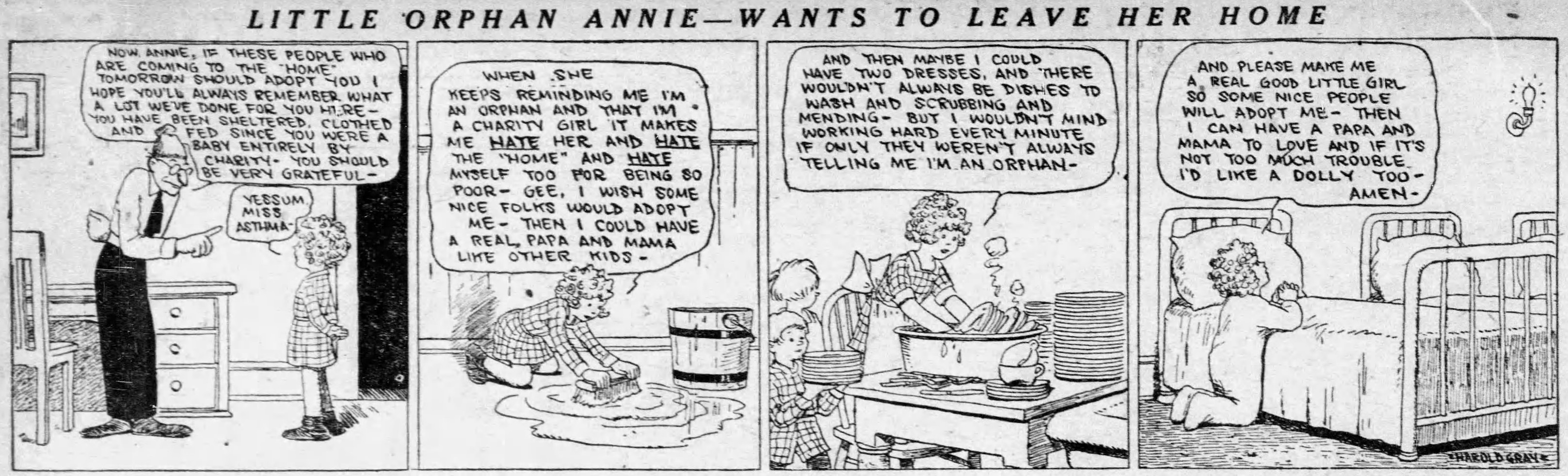
The first appearance of Annie

- The American newspaper comic strip Little Orphan Annie, created by Harold Gray and syndicated by New York's Daily News, made its first appearance. Named for James Whitcomb Riley's 1885 poem "Little Orphant Annie", but not related to the well-known verse, the popular feature would be adapted to an NBC Radio show on the Blue Network from in 1931 to 1942, to two films (in 1932 and 1938) and to the successful Broadway musical Annie in 1977. After Gray's death in 1968, Little Orphan Annie was continued by other artists but would finally cease on June 13, 2010.
- The German delegation, including Chancellor Wilhelm Marx and Foreign Minister Gustav Stresemann, joined the London reparations conference.
- John Ross Campbell was charged under the Incitement to Mutiny Act 1797 for the July 25 editorial in Workers' Weekly. The British public became bitterly split on what was known as the Campbell Case, as conservatives wanted Campbell locked up while liberals said that rights to free speech were being suppressed.
- The film Janice Meredith premiered at the Cosmopolitan Theatre in New York City.
- Born:
  - Kéba Mbaye, Senegalese judge who served on the International Court of Justice, the International Commission of Jurists, and the International Olympic Committee; in Kaolack, French Senegal (d. 2007)
  - Billie Hayes (stage name for Billie Armstrong Brosch), American comedian, TV and stage actress known for portraying "Witchiepoo" on the H.R. Pufnstuf series, and "Mammy Yokum" in the 1956 Broadway musical Li'l Abner; in Du Quoin, Illinois (d. 2021)
- Died: Harold Albert Kullberg, 27, American World War One flying ace who had 19 aerial victories with the Royal Air Force and for Canada's Royal Flying Corps, was killed in a plane crash while instructing a student.

== August 6, 1924 (Wednesday) ==
- The Treaty of Lausanne, a peace treaty between Turkey and the Allied Powers signed on July 24, 1923, went into effect, thus completing the restoration of peace following the First World War.
- Con artist Charles Ponzi, known for the "Ponzi scheme", was released from prison in Plymouth, Massachusetts after serving less than four years of a five year federal sentence. He then reported to the District Attorney in Boston, where he faced 10 indictments by the Commonwealth of Massachusetts and was arrested again. A benefactor from West Roxbury put up his bond of $14,000 and Ponzi was freed until a trial date could be set.
- Born: Ella Jenkins, U.S. folk singer; in St. Louis (d. 2024)

== August 7, 1924 (Thursday) ==
- The Convention for the Suppression of the Circulation of and Traffic in Obscene Publications, signed by 34 nations on September 12, 1923, took effect 30 days after ratification by two nations.
- Japan and the Soviet Union began negotiations to bring about a normalization of relations.
- Born: Kenneth Kendall, British broadcaster; in British India (d. 2012)
- Died: Bruce Grit (John Edward Bruce), 68, African-American newspaper publisher, journalist, historian and writer. Born as a slave in Maryland in 1856, he grew up to help create the Argus Weekly (Washington DC); the Sunday Item and the Republican (Norfolk, Virginia).

== August 8, 1924 (Friday) ==
- The United Kingdom signed the General Treaty and the Treaty of Commerce and Navigation with the Soviet Union, giving British exports most favoured nation status in exchange for the granting of a loan to the Soviet government.
- Grand Duke Kirill Vladimirovich of Russia, a first cousin of the late Tsar Nicholas II, declared himself as "Guardian of the Throne" for the Russian Empire.
- The Fortune Theatre opened for West End stage productions in Westminster, London.
- The Opera Nazionale Montessori opened in Rome.
- Born:
  - Gene Deitch, American film and TV animator, and creative director for Terrytoons; in Chicago (d. 2020)
  - Berislav Klobučar, Yugoslavian Croatian-born conductor of the Vienna State Opera; in Zagreb (d. 2014)
- Died: Karansinhji II Vajirajji, 78, the Thakur of the princely state of Lakhtar for 78 years, the sixth longest of any ruler in world history. He was succeeded by his son Balvirsinhji Karansinhji.

== August 9, 1924 (Saturday) ==
- In the first boxing match ever staged at Wembley Stadium, light heavyweight boxer Tommy Gibbons of the U.S. knocked out Jack Bloomfield in the third round of a non-title bout staged as part of the British Empire Exhibition. Bloomfield was knocked out in the 3rd round, and never fought again.
- The second World Scout Jamboree opened in Denmark at Ermelunden with thousands of Scouts from around the world, and closed on August 17.
- Born: Pat Maloney Sr., American trial lawyer for personal injury lawsuits; in San Antonio, Texas (d. 2005)

== August 10, 1924 (Sunday) ==
- The Canton Merchants' Corps Uprising began in the Republic of China as the British freighter Harvard arrived in Canton (now Guangzhou) with guns and ammunition that had been purchased by the merchants. Before the cargo could be unloaded, the city's police seized the shipment. The merchant's corps then called a strike across all of the Guangdong Province, and violence over the next two months claimed 2,000 casualties.
- Austrian police said they had uncovered a Soviet slush fund used for stirring up unrest and revolt in the Balkans.
- Born:
  - Nancy Buckingham, English Gothic and romance novelist; in Bristol (d. 2022)
  - Eric Liddell, Australian-born lawn bowler who led Hong Kong to world outdoor championships in 1972 and 1980; in Bairnsdale, Victoria (d. 1991)
- Died:
  - General Arcadio Maxílom, 61, officer in the Philippine Revolution who was one of the last commanders to surrender to the United States in 1901.
  - Robert Francis Peel, 50, British Army colonel and Governor of Saint Helena since 1920

== August 11, 1924 (Monday) ==
- Lee de Forest filmed U.S. President Calvin Coolidge on the White House lawn using his experimental Phonofilm sound-on-film process, resulting in the earliest sound film footage of an American president.
- Britain and Turkey agreed to submit their territorial dispute over the Mosul question to the League of Nations. This concerned the border between Turkey and the British mandate for Iraq and which side should take possession of the mostly Kurdish territory of the Ottoman Empire's former Mosul Vilayet.
- Anti-British riots broke out in Atbarah in Sudan. British troops fired on rioting Egyptian railway labourers, killing 10 of them.
- In the Hyderabad State of British India, rioting injured 400 people and killed at least 10 in Gulbarga (now Kalaburagi in Karnataka state). The date coincided with the Ashura holiday on the Islamic calendar and with a practice by Hindus in Hyderabad to carry a holy idol from the Sharana Basaveshwara Temple in a procession through the streets on Mondays. The riots then spread during the week to throughout British India and Burma.
- Andrew S. Anderson, who had won the Democratic Party nomination for the South Dakota election for Governor, was killed on his farm near Beresford, South Dakota, when he was gored by a bull.
- The historical drama film Monsieur Beaucaire, starring Rudolph Valentino and Bebe Daniels, was released.

== August 12, 1924 (Tuesday) ==
- The Paris newspaper Le Journal claimed to have indisputable proof that the Soviet Union had established a secret tribunal assigned with the task of creating revolutionary activity in European colonies.
- Retired boxer Kid McCoy, who held the world middleweight title from 1896 to 1899, came home drunk to his Los Angeles apartment and shot his lover, Teresa Mors, after she told him what her friends thought of him. The next day, McCoy went to an antique shop owned by the estranged husband of Mors, looking to kill him as well, and took 11 hostages while waiting for his intended target. After a while, McCoy fled until police apprehended him. Later convicted of manslaughter instead of murder, McCoy would serve eight years in prison until his parole in 1932.
- Born:
  - Muhammad Zia-ul-Haq, President of Pakistan from 1978 to 1988; in Jalandhar, British India (d. 1988)
  - Derek Shackleton, English cricketer in first-class cricket and seven Test cricket matches, leading wicket-taker in four seasons from 1962 to 1965; in Todmorden, Yorkshire (d. 2007)
  - Jimmy Doyle (ring name for James Delaney), American welterweight boxer who was fatally injured in a 1947 fight against Sugar Ray Robinson for the world welterweight title; in Los Angeles (d. 1947)

== August 13, 1924 (Wednesday) ==
- A mutiny charge against John Ross Campbell was dropped when Travers Humphreys, prosecutor for the Crown, informed the court that "Since process has been issued in this case it has been represented that the object and intention of the article in question was not to endeavour to seduce men in the fighting forces from their duty and allegiance, or to induce them to disobey lawful orders, but that it was comment upon armed military force being used by the State for the suppression of industrial disputes." Humphreys said that he had been instructed not to offer any evidence upon the charge, and so Campbell was freed. Sir Patrick Hastings, the Attorney General, had stopped the prosecution after learning that Campbell was an injured war veteran, and that prosecution was opposed by Labour government. He concluded that a trial before a jury was likely to fail.
- Born:
  - Yuri Orlov, Soviet physicist and dissident who founded the Moscow Helsinki Group; in Moscow (d. 2020)
  - Monica Clare, Aboriginal Australian political activist and the first indigenous woman to have a novel (Karobran: The Story of an Aboriginal Girl) published; in Dareel, Queensland (d. 1973)
  - Jackie Worthington, American rodeo rider who founded the Women's Professional Rodeo Association, originally as the Girl's Rodeo Association; in Jacksboro, Texas (d. 1987)
  - Trude Feldman, American journalist and member of the White House Press Corps; in Los Angeles (d. 2022)

== August 14, 1924 (Thursday) ==
- As many as 14,000 people were reported dead in flooding in the Zhili and Hunan provinces of China.
- U.S. President Calvin Coolidge formally accepted the nomination for re-election in a speech at the Memorial Continental Hall in Washington, saying the people wanted "a government of common sense."
- Born:
  - Holger Juul Hansen, Danish TV and film actor, known for the show Matador; in Nyborg (d. 2013)
  - Eduardo Fajardo, Spanish film, stage and TV actor who appeared in 183 films, 75 plays, and over 2,000 TV episodes in a 55-year career; in Meis (d. 2019)
  - Emmanuel Oyedele (E. O.) Ashamu, Nigerian tribal leader and owner of Industrial Chemists Ltd., as well as Oke Afa farms, Premier Farms and Oyo Feeds; in Oyo (d. 1992)
  - Dr. Maeve Hillery, English-born Irish anesthesiologist who was First Lady of Ireland from 1976 to 1990 during the presidency of Patrick Hillery; as Mary Beatrice Finnegan, in Sheffield, Yorkshire (d. 2015)
- Died: L. Rogers Lytton (stage name for Oscar Legare Rogers), American stage and silent film actor who appeared in 90 films for Vitagraph Studios between 1912 and 1924; in New Orleans

== August 15, 1924 (Friday) ==
- Eligio Ayala was reinstalled as President of Paraguay, after having resigned on March 17 in favor of Luis Alberto Riart. Ayala resumed office after being confirmed in a popular vote without any opposition.
- Misericordia University was founded in Dallas, Pennsylvania.
- Born:
  - S. Daniel Abraham, American billionaire and founder of Thompson Medical Company, later acquired by Unilever; in Long Beach, New York (d. 2025)
  - Robert Bolt, English playwright and screenwriter, winner of two Academy Awards (for Doctor Zhivago and for A Man for All Seasons; in Sale, Cheshire (d. 1995)
  - Phyllis Schlafly, American lawyer, anti-feminist activist and author who successfully lobbied against the ratification of the Equal Rights Amendment to the U.S. Constitution; as Phyllis McAlpin Stewart, in St. Louis, Missouri (d. 2016)
  - Petrus Kastenman, Swedish equestrian and 1956 Olympic gold medalist; in Bälinge, Södermanland (d. 2013)
  - Werner Abrolat, German film and TV actor; in Tilsit, East Prussia (now Sovetsk in Russia) (d. 1997)
- Died: Francis Knollys, 1st Viscount Knollys, 87, British Private Secretary to King Edward VII

== August 16, 1924 (Saturday) ==
- The body of Italian opposition leader Giacomo Matteotti, who had been kidnapped on June 10 after making speeches against Fascist Prime Minister Benito Mussolini, was found in a shallow ditch about 14 miles (23 km) outside of Rome. Three members of the Fascist Party— Amerigo Dumini of the Fascist secret police, the Ceka; Giuseppe Viola, and Amleto Poveromo would be convicted of Matteotti's murder, and be released from prison 11 months later by a general amnesty proclaimed by King Victor Emmanuel III.
- Boris Savinkov, a Russian terrorist with the paramilitary wing of the outlawed Socialist Revolutionary Party, was arrested in Minsk by the Soviet secret police agency OGPU after being tricked into returning to the Soviet Union by a police agent.
- An agreement to enact the Dawes Plan was signed in London by the European powers, pending formal ratification by the respective parliaments of the countries concerned. The French and Belgians agreed to end their occupation of the Ruhr in one year's time.
- Died: Roy Daugherty, 54, former Western outlaw, was killed in a gunfight with lawmen.

== August 17, 1924 (Sunday) ==
- Anthropologist Margaret Mead arrived in American Samoa and began work on her 1928 landmark book, Coming of Age in Samoa: A Psychological Study of Primitive Youth for Western Civilisation.
- Two priests and two policemen were reported killed and many injured in rioting in Mandalay, Burma, that occurred over the course of a political procession led by a Buddhist priest associated with a movement for home rule.
- Born:
  - Evan S. Connell, American novelist known for his 1959 book Mrs. Bridge, later adapted, along with its sequel, to the 1990 film Mr. & Mrs. Bridge; in Kansas City, Missouri (d. 2013)
  - Idris II, Sultan of Perak, ruler of the Malay State of Perak from 1963 to 1984; in Kuala Kangsar, Federated Malay States (d. 1984)
- Died: Pavel Urysohn, 26, Russian mathematician and topology theorist, drowned while on vacation in Brittany in France, when he went swimming in the ocean while visiting a beach at Batz-sur-Mer. During his brief career, Urysohn developed Urysohn's metrization theorem and Urysohn's lemma. He also postulated Urysohn universal space, and was co-developer of Menger–Urysohn dimension and Fréchet–Urysohn space.

== August 18, 1924 (Monday) ==
- The occupied German towns of Offenburg and Appenweier were evacuated by French troops as a gesture of good faith on France's part to enact the London pact.
- The remaining two planes attempting to fly around the world were damaged attempting to take off from Reykjavík to Greenland because they were too loaded down with gasoline.
- Died: LeBaron B. Colt, 78, U.S. Senator for Rhode Island since 1913 and former federal judge

== August 19, 1924 (Tuesday) ==
- The state began its closing arguments in the Leopold and Loeb trial.
- Charles G. Dawes formally accepted the U.S. vice presidential nomination in a speech on the lawn of his Evanston, Illinois home.
- The first ascent of the 2,603 metres (8,540 ft) Mount Fitzsimmons, in British Columbia was made by a party of Canadian mountaineers from the British Columbia Mountaineering Club.
- Born: Willard Boyle, Canadian physicist and 2009 Nobel Prize in Physics laureate for "the invention of an imaging semiconductor circuit – the CCD sensor, which has become an electronic eye in almost all areas of photography"; in Amherst, Nova Scotia (d. 2011)

== August 20, 1924 (Wednesday) ==
- The Victoria-Vélez Treaty was signed by the Foreign Ministers of Panama (Nicolás Victoria Jaén) and Colombia (Jorge Vélez) and setting a permanent boundary between the two nations. Panama had formerly been part of Colombia as the Departamento del Istmo and the border was based on the separation of Istmo from the Chocó Department of Colombia.
- Britain and Turkey reached agreement on the Mosul Question concerning the border of the British mandate for Iraq.
- In the U.S. state of South Dakota, Doane Robinson of the state historical society invited sculptor Gutzon Borglum to come to the Black Hills region in the western part of the state to consider being hired to sculpt a monument on the side of a mountain. Robinson had initially approached Lorado Taft about carving liknesses of Lewis and Clark, Red Cloud, and Crazy Horse on another rock formation, "The Needles". Borglum came to the state on September 24 to meet Robinson and would eventually create a different concept in a different site in the Black Hills, Mount Rushmore.
- U.S. Senator Nathaniel B. Dial and his challenger for the Democratic Party's nomination, John J. McMahan, were both arrested for disorderly conduct in Gaffney, South Carolina after a campaign meeting broke up amid threats of violence. Dial approached McMahan brandishing a chair after he charged that McMahan had called him a "dirty liar".
- Victor Herbert's final production, the operetta The Dream Girl, opened at the Ambassador Theatre in New York.
- Born:
  - Ray Wijewardene, Sri Lankan engineer and agricultural specialist who invented a two-wheel walking tractor to increase production of farmers in the Third World; in Colombo, British Ceylon (d. 2010)
  - Jorge Abraham Hazoury, Dominican Republic educator and physician who founded the Universidad Iberoamericana (UNIBE) in 1982; in Santa Cruz de Barahona (d. 2004)

== August 21, 1924 (Thursday) ==
- The world flyers, U.S. Army Lieutenants Lowell Smith and Erik Nelson landed in Greenland at Frederiksdal, 12 hours after departing Reykjavík in Iceland. The only other competitors, a crew of three commanded by Antonio Locatelli of Italy, went down in the sea in Greenland, where they were rescued later by the USS Richmond (CL-9).
- U.S. President Coolidge made public a letter he wrote to the National Negro Business League, praising the African-American population for "the assumption of a full and honorable part in the economic life of the nation" and his belief in equal rights for all races, though not with any assistance from the federal government. Coolidge wrote, "it may fairly said that the colored people themselves have already substantially solved these phases of their problem," and added that "If they will but go forward along the lines of their progress in recent decades... their future would be well cared for." Commenting that "Our constitution guarantees equal rights to all our citizens without discrimination on account of race or color. I have taken my oath to support that constitution," he praised the "economic emancipation being splendidly wrought out by the colored people for themselves; so I believe their full political rights will be won through the inevitable logic of their position and rightfulness of their claims."

== August 22, 1924 (Friday) ==
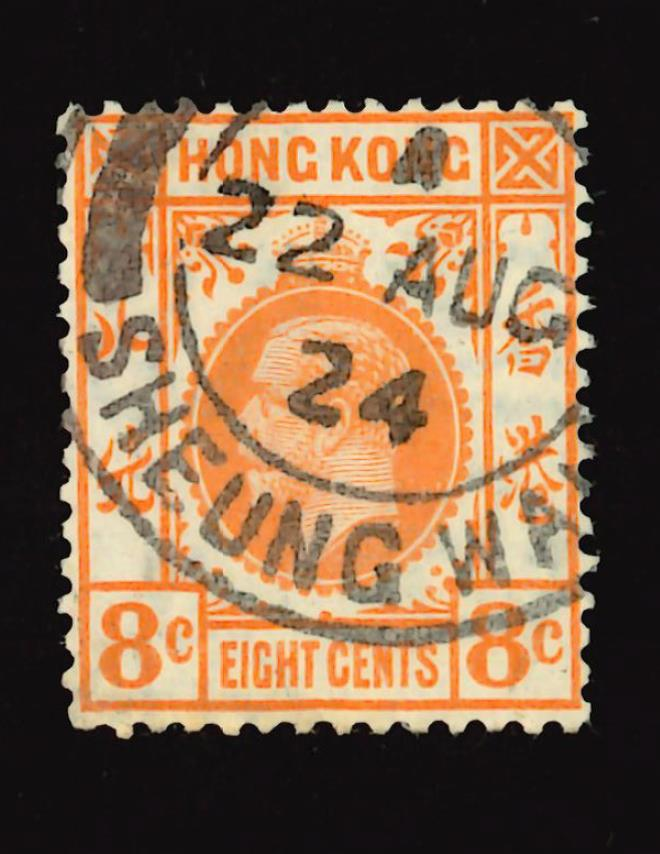
A timepiece created in Sheung Wan Victoria Hong Kong on 22 August 1924

- Clarence Darrow presented his closing argument in the Leopold and Loeb case.
- U.S. presidential candidate John W. Davis condemned the Ku Klux Klan by name in a speech in Sea Girt, New Jersey, reviving an issue that had badly split the Democratic Party at the National Convention. Davis called on President Coolidge to do the same.
- The Agatha Christie novel The Man in the Brown Suit was published.
- Communists in the Reichstag filibustered Chancellor Wilhelm Marx by causing a loud disturbance of hoots and jeers when he tried to speak on the London conference ahead of a vote on the matter. The session was suspended and police were called in, but no clause could be found by which to arrest those who were causing the disturbance and the Reichstag adjourned for the day.
- As Mars was making its closest approach to Earth, radio stations heard what were believed to be "signals which apparently were operated by some intelligent force, yet which could be identified with no earthly telegraph code" on their receivers. Engineers pointed out after the reports that the radio receiving technology available on Earth at the time would not be able to pick up a telegraph signal from more than 10,000 miles (16,000 km) away and that acquiring signals from 34 million miles away would be "highly improbable, if not impossible."
- Born:
  - Pat O'Connor, New Zealand-born professional wrestler, world heavyweight champion in both the National Wrestling Alliance and the American Wrestling Association; in Raetihi (d. 1990)
  - Sinforiano Garcia, Paraguayan footballer and goalkeeper with 20 caps for the Paraguay national team; in Puerto Pinasco (d. 1992)
  - Ada Jafri, Pakistani poet and the first major female Urdu language poet; in Badaun, United Provinces, British India (d. 2015)
  - Frances M. Gage, Canadian sculptor; in Windsor, Ontario (d. 2017)

== August 23, 1924 (Saturday) ==
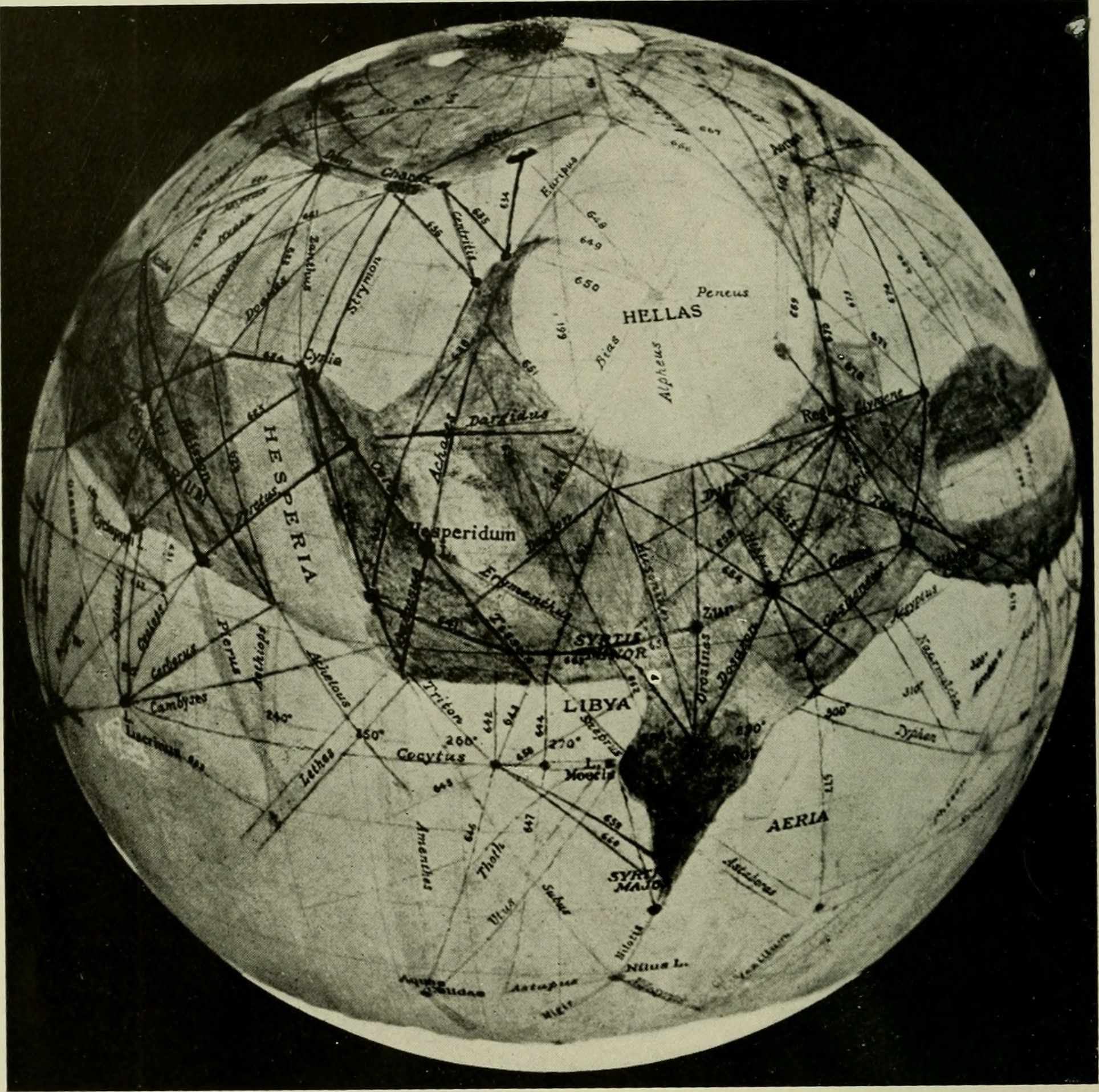
Percival Lowell's 1909 sketches of the "canals" of Mars

- The planets Mars and Earth were the closest they had been since August 18, 1845, and the closest since high-power telescopes had been constructed, coming within 0.373 astronomical units of each other, equivalent to 34,630,000 miles (55,730,000 km), at about 0100 UTC. Mars and Earth would not be as close as 0.373 au again until August 28, 2003.
- The earliest recorded goal from a corner kick in a soccer football game, a rule change approved by FIFA on June 14, was made by Billy Alston of St Bernard's F.C. in a Scottish League Second Division game in a match against Albion Rovers F.C. which St Bernard's won, 2 to 1. The role of Alston is acknowledged by FIFA, which lists the game as having been on August 21.

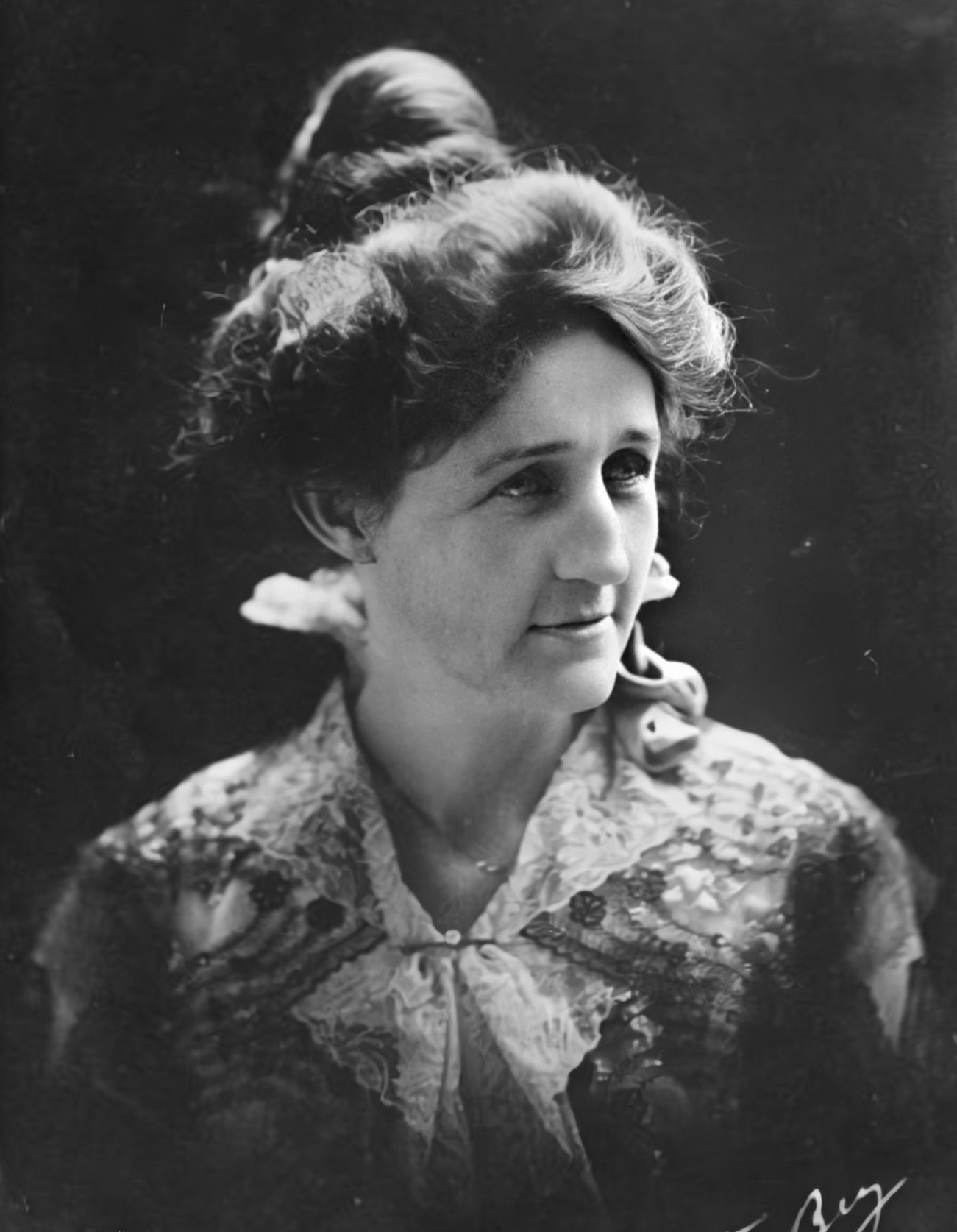
Miriam Ferguson, first woman to be nominated by a major party for state governor

- Miriam A. "Ma" Ferguson won the runoff election for the Democratic Party nomination for Governor of Texas, defeating Felix D. Robertson after the two candidates had received the highest plurality of votes in the July 26 primary without either receiving a majority. Ferguson's win in the heavily Democrat U.S. state virtually guaranteed that she would become the first woman to be elected governor of a U.S. state, with the general election set for November 4.
- In a speech in Maine, U.S. vice presidential candidate Charles G. Dawes responded to John W. Davis' challenge of the previous day by also denouncing the Ku Klux Klan by name. He then said that the issue had "no proper place in this or any other campaign."
- The Prince of Wales boarded the ocean liner RMS Berengaria at Ryde at England's Isle of Wight, to begin his journey to North America for a tour of the United States and Canada.
- Born:
  - Robert Solow, American economist and 1987 Nobel Prize in Economic Sciences laureate, known for the Solow–Swan model of long term economic growth; in Brooklyn, New York City (d. 2023)
  - Ephraim Kishon, Hungarian-born Israeli author, screenwriter and film director; as Ferenc Hoffmann in Budapest (d. 2005)
  - Brien S. Wygle, American test pilot who made the first Boeing 737 flight (as pilot) and the first Boeing 747 flight (as co-pilot); in Seattle (d. 2020)
  - David Boyd, Australian artist; in Murrumbeena, Victoria (d. 2011)
  - Sherm Lollar (John Sherman Lollar), U.S. baseball catcher and 9-time all-star during the 1950s; in Durham, Arkansas (d. 1977)
- Died: Heinrich Berté, 66, Austro-Hungarian composer

== August 24, 1924 (Sunday) ==
- Yasin al-Hashimi was appointed as the Prime Minister of Iraq by King Faisal I.
- The drama film Lily of the Dust, starring Pola Negri, was released.
- The accident at the center of the famous torts case Palsgraf v. Long Island Railroad took place in Brooklyn New York.
- Born:
  - Ahmadou Ahidjo, the first President of Cameroon, from 1960 to 1982; in Garoua, British Cameroon (d. 1989)
  - Bob Thompson, U.S. composer and orchestra leader; in San Jose, California (d. 2013)
- Died: Elizabeth Avery Colton, 51, American educator, author and advocate for women's colleges, died of a spinal tumor.

== August 25, 1924 (Monday) ==
- German Chancellor Wilhelm Marx told the Reichstag that he would ratify the London agreement whether the Reichstag approved it or not, even if it caused a dissolution of parliament and lead to new elections.
- The drama film The Enemy Sex starring Betty Compson was released.
- Turkey and the League of Nations reached an agreement on the Mosul issue.
- Born: Samuel Bowers, American white supremacist and convicted murderer known for the 1966 murder of Vernon Dahmer and for conspiracy in the 1964 Mississippi Burning murders; in New Orleans (d. 2006)
- Died:
  - Mariano Álvarez, 106, Filipino revolutionary and General in the war against Spain. The Philippine city of General Mariano Alvarez, created in 1981 from Carmona, Cavite, is named in his honor.
  - John Owen, 63, American sprinter who held the world record for the 100-yard dash (9.8 seconds) in 1890, was killed in a horseback riding accident.

== August 26, 1924 (Tuesday) ==
- The Montreal Star published an interview with Henry Ford in which he was quoted as saying that the Ku Klux Klan was "a victim of lying propaganda" and "if the truth were known about it, it would be looked up to as a body of patriots."
- Died: Eugène Py, 65, French film pioneer

== August 27, 1924 (Wednesday) ==
- Built for the U.S. Navy, paid for by the German government and constructed by the Zeppelin Company as part of World War I reparations, the dirigible USS Los Angeles made its first flight.
- The American Telephone and Telegraph Company announced that a color photograph had been successfully transmitted from Chicago to New York. The process took less than an hour and was done by separating the colors at the point of sending and then reassembling them when received.
- Born:
  - Sirilal Kodikara, Sri Lankan Sinhalese novelist (d. 2021)
  - R. A. Chandrasena, Sri Lankan Tamil musician; in Mahanuvara (d. 1980)
  - Paulette Cherici-Porello, Monaco-born Monégasque dialect author; in Monte Carlo (d. 2018)
- Died: Edson J. Chamberlin, 72, American-born Canadian businessman and former president of the Grand Trunk Railway.

== August 28, 1924 (Thursday) ==
- The August Uprising, an attempt by Georgian independence activists to overthrow the Soviet Communist government of the Georgian Soviet Socialist Republic, began a day earlier than planned when activists in the mining town of Chiatura rose up against the local Communists. Nearby units of the Soviet Red Army went on alert with the element of surprise no longer available to the Georgians.
- The John Ford-directed Western film The Iron Horse premiered in New York City.
- Born:
  - Berislav Klobučar, Yugoslavian Croatian-born conductor of the Vienna State Opera; in Zagreb (d. 2014)
  - Peggy Ryan, American dancer and actress, co-star with Donald O'Connor in Patrick the Great and with O'Connor and Gloria Jean in Get Hep to Love and When Johnny Comes Marching Home; in Long Beach, California (d. 2004)

== August 29, 1924 (Friday) ==
- The German Reichstag voted, 314 to 117, to accept the London protocol on the Dawes report. The vote was not expected to pass so easily but moderate right-wing factions gave it their support, giving rise to rumors that they had extracted concessions of cabinet posts in exchange for their vote. Erich Ludendorff marched out after the vote and called it "infamous".
- The collision of two Indian railway trains killed 107 passengers and two employees, near Harappa in the Punjab Province in what is now Pakistan.
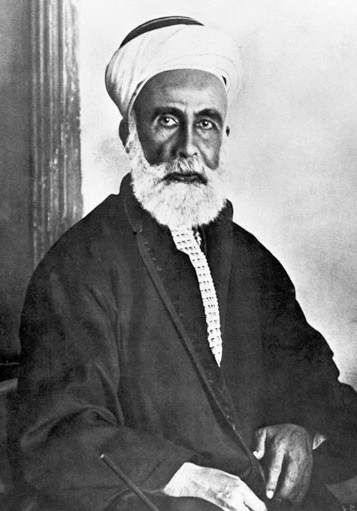
King Hussein bin Ali of Hejaz
- The Sultanate of Nejd, led by King Abdulaziz ibn Saud, launched an attack on the neighboring Kingdom of Hejaz, ruled by King Hussein bin Ali and the location of both the holy city of Mecca and the city of Jeddah. The mission of conquest came after citizens of Nejd had been barred by the King of Hejaz from making the pilgrimage to Mecca. Troops from Nejd, commanded by Sultan bin Bajad al-Otaybi, proceeded into the Hejaz city of Taif and captured it in a few days, then carried out a massacre of the outnumbered defenders. Hejaz would be conquered within three months, and Nejd would annex the kingdom to create the kingdom of Saudi Arabia.
- Edward, Prince of Wales arrived in New York City aboard the RMS Berengaria and began his visit to the United States and Canada.
- KOMZET (Komitet po zemelnomu ustroystvu yevreyskikh trudyashchikhsya), the Soviet Union's "Committee for the Settlement of Jewish Workers", was established to forcibly relocate Jewish people in Russia and the other Soviet republics.

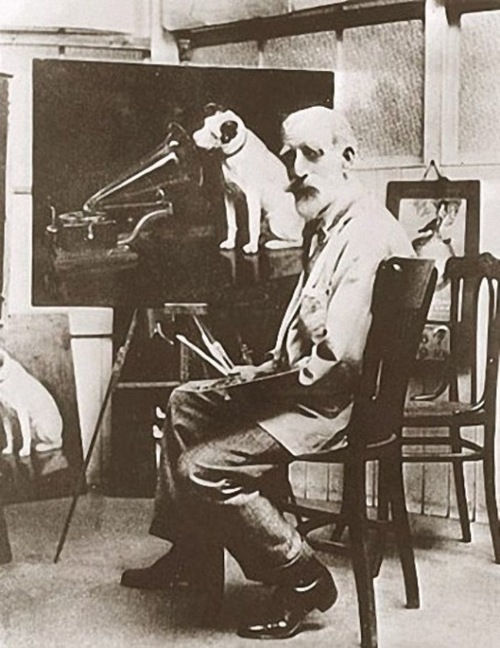
Barraud and the picture of his dog Nipper

- Died:
  - Francis Barraud, 68, English painter best known for creating His Master's Voice in 1899, the widely-reproduced image of a dog listening to a gramophone record player
  - Jenny Dufau, 46, German-Alsatian opera singer

== August 30, 1924 (Saturday) ==
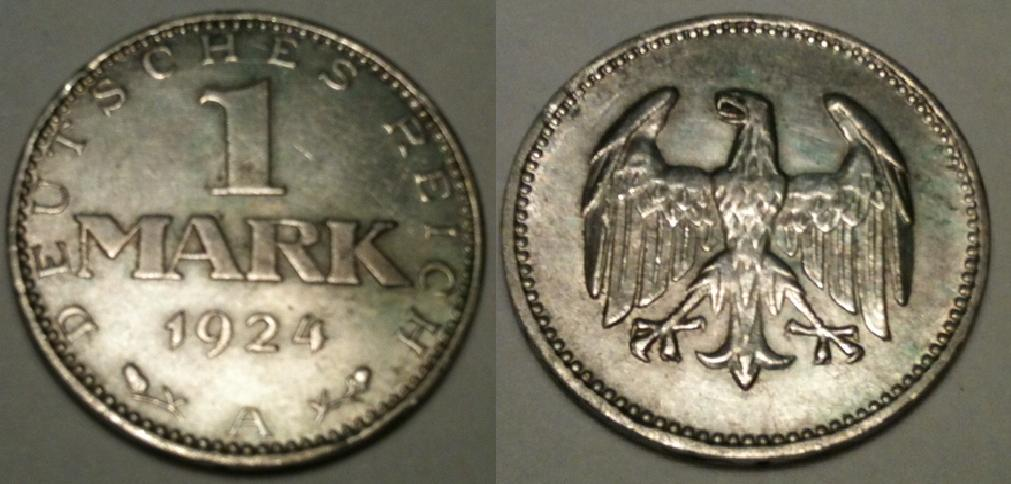
The 1924 Reichsmark coin

- With hyperinflation in Germany out of control in the Weimar Republic, the almost worthless German papiermark was finally taken out of circulation. The Reichsbank replaced the Rentenmark of 1923 (whose value had fallen by two-thirds in one year) with the new Reichsmark coin, which was exchanged at 1:1 ratio with the Rentenmark and at a 1,000,000,000,000:1 (one trillion to 1) with the papiermark.
- The Dawes Plan was formally put into effect with a signing in London by diplomatic representatives of Germany and the United Kingdom, Belgium, France, Greece, Italy, Japan, Portugal and Yugoslavia.
- In accordance with its agreement to the Dawes Plan, Germany created the government-owned Deutsche Reichsbahn-Gesellschaft to operate Germany's railways and to use its profits to contribute to paying off the nation's war reparations.
- Six people were killed in clashes with the Ku Klux Klan in Herrin, Illinois.
- The Prince of Wales met with President Coolidge and his family at the White House in an informal two-hour visit.
- Lebanese citizenship was legally created by decree of France's High Commissioner of the Levant for the French Mandate of Lebanon and Syria, Maxime Weygand. Citing Article 30 of the Treaty of Lausanne clause with respect for former territories of the Ottoman Empire, based in Turkey, Weygand declared "any person who was a Turkish subject and who resided in the territories of Lebanon on August 30, 1924, is confirmed as a Lebanese subject and is henceforth considered to have lost Turkish citizenship."
- Born:
  - Geoffrey Beene, American fashion designer; as Samuel Bozeman Jr. in Haynesville, Louisiana (d. 2004)
  - Sir Peter Parker, British businessman and Chairman of the British Railways Board from 1976 to 1983 (d. 2002)
- Died:
  - Waldemar Jungner, 55, Swedish engineer who invented the Nickel–cadmium battery (1898), the nickel–iron battery (1899) and the rechargeable silver–cadmium battery (1900), died of pneumonia.
  - Valiko Jugheli, 37, Georgian revolutionary, was executed by the Soviet Cheka after his role in the unsuccessful August Uprising.

== August 31, 1924 (Sunday) ==
- Paavo Nurmi set a new world record for the 10,000 metre race, running a time of 30:06.2. Finnish officials had not allowed Nurmi to compete in the 10,000m in the Paris Olympics in July, due to fears for his health.

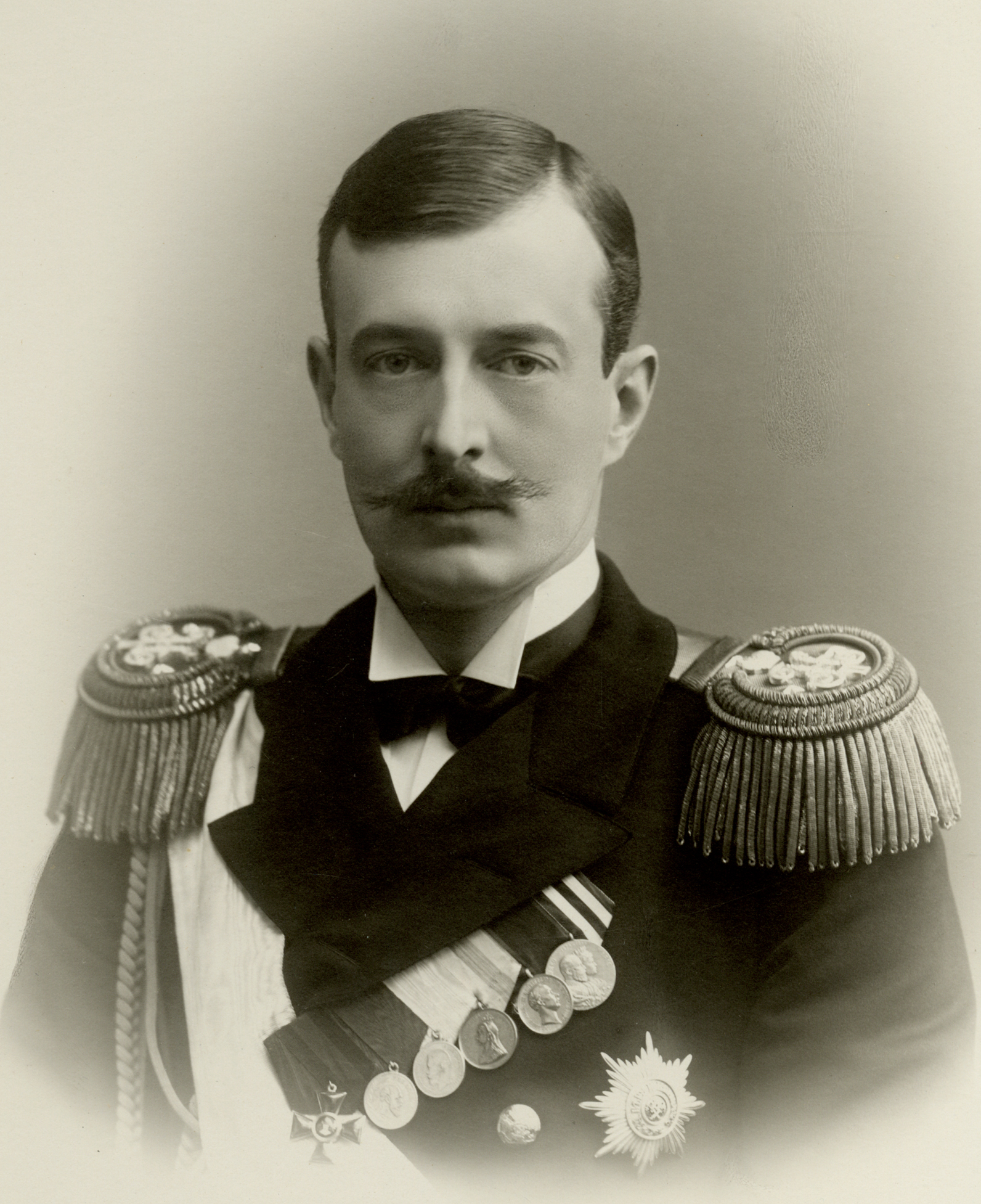
Grand Duke Kirill of Russia

- Grand Duke Kirill Vladimirovich of Russia, a former officer of the Imperial Russian Navy, first cousin to the late Tsar Nicholas II of the Russian Empire and grandson of the Tsar Alexander II, proclaimed himself to be the Tsar of all the Russias as the closest living heir to the Tsar Nicholas.
- The round-the-world flyers reached continental North America again when they landed at Indian Harbour, Labrador.
- John W. Davis, the Democratic Party nominee for U.S. president, followed the example of President and Republican Party nominee Calvin Coolidge and recorded a brief address on Phonofilm to be played for film audiences.
- The melodrama film Wine, starring Clara Bow in her first lead role, was released.
- Born: Buddy Hackett (stage name for Leonard Hacker), American film and TV comedian; in Brooklyn, New York (d. 2003)
- Died: Todor Aleksandrov, 43, leader of the Internal Macedonian Revolutionary Organisation (IMRO), was assassinated a little more than month after the Communist organization Comintern had published IMRO's secret "May Manifesto" following Aleksandrov's refusal to join Comintern. Aleksandrov was shot in the back, along with his bodyguard Panzo Zafirov.
