= UFM =

UFM may refer to:

- UFM100.3, a Mandarin radio station in Singapore
- Ultrasonic force microscopy
- Unidad Falangista Montañesa, a Spanish political party
- Union des Femmes Monégasques, a women's organization in Monaco
- Union for the Mediterranean, an intergovernmental organisation
- United Farmers of Manitoba, an agrarian political movement
- Universidad Francisco Marroquin, a private, secular university in Guatemala City, Guatemala
- University of Finance and Management in Warsaw, the former name of VIZJA University, Poland
