= Brien S. Wygle =

American pilot (1924–2020)

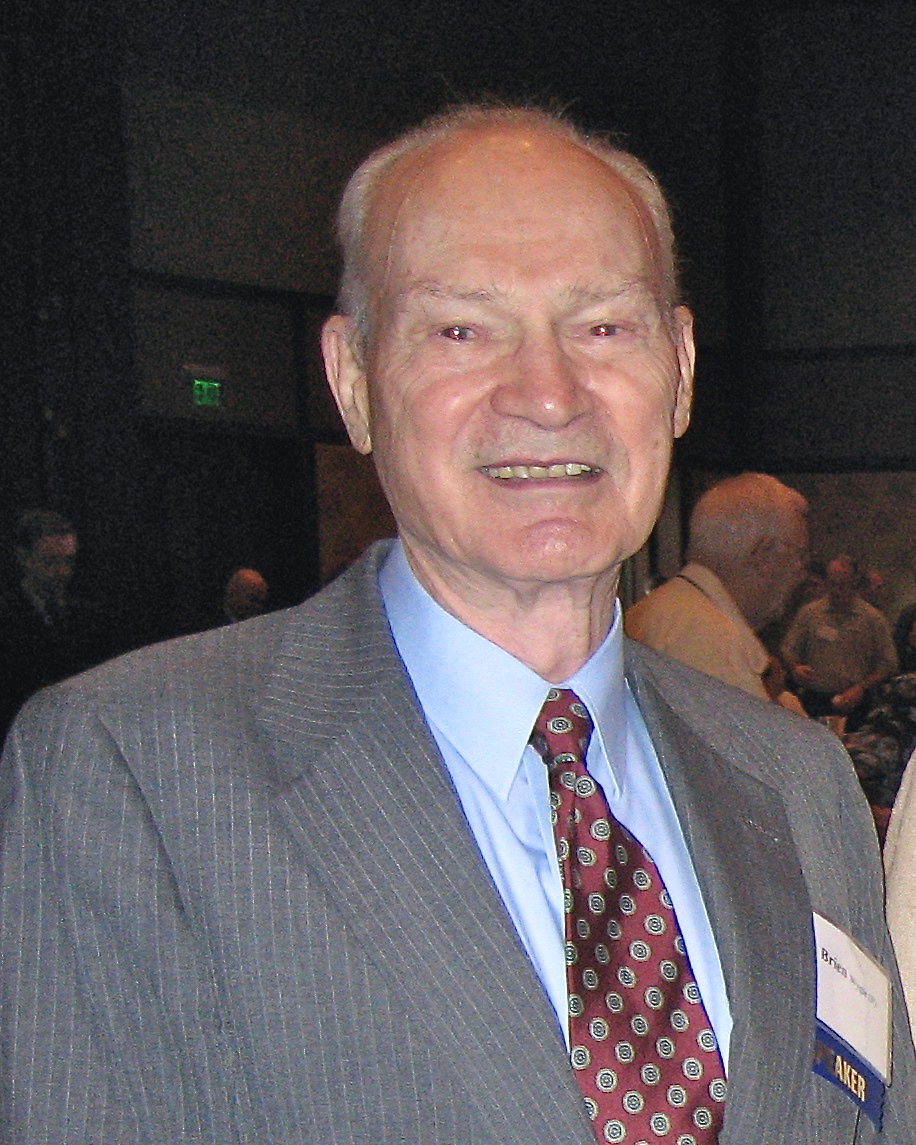
- Wygle in 2009
- Born: August 23, 1924; Seattle, Washington US
- Died: September 15, 2020 (aged 96); Bellevue, Washington, US
- Occupation: Test pilot
- Spouse: Norma Renton (m. 1947; died 2003)
- Children: 4

Brien Singleton Wygle (August 23, 1924 – September 15, 2020) was an American pilot from Seattle, Washington. Wygle was a test pilot for Boeing.

== Early life ==
On August 23, 1924. Wygle was born as Brien Singleton Wygle in Seattle, Washington. Wygle's brothers are Hugh Wygle and Monte Wygle. In 1927, Wygle and his family moved to Canada. Wygle grew up in a farm near Calgary, Alberta, Canada. In 1942, Wygle graduated from Kathryn High School in Canada.

== Education ==
In 1951, Wygle earned a Bachelor of Science mechanical engineering degree with aeronautics from University of British Columbia in Vancouver, Canada. In 1953, Wygle graduated from United States Air Force Test Pilot School.

== Career ==
In 1942, at age 18, Wygle joined the Royal Canadian Air Force. During World War II, Wygle became a pilot for the Royal Canadian Air Force. Wygle flew the Douglas C-47 Skytrain as a combat cargo pilot.

In 1948, Wygle flew bombing missions for Israel.

In 1951, Wygle became a test pilot for Boeing in Wichita, Kansas. In 1951, Wygle's first assignment was flying the B-47 bomber. After transferring to Seattle, Washington, Wygle flew the Boeing B-52 Stratofortress bomber as a lead project pilot. In 1957, Wygle performed flight testing as a pilot for the Boeing 707 airliner. In 1967, Wygle flew the first Boeing 737 flight as a test pilot.

Wygle was the co-pilot of the first Boeing 747 flight that took place on February 9, 1969, in Everett, Washington. For the first flight, he flew as co-pilot with the pilot in command Jack Waddell and the Flight engineer Jesse Wallick. During this flight, they experienced minor problems with the wing flaps and decided to cut the flight short.

In 1970, Wygle became a Director of flight tests at Boeing.

In January 1990, Wygle retired from Boeing as the Vice President of flight operations.

== Awards ==
- 1945 Distinguished Flying Cross for valor

== Personal life ==
In May 1947, Wygle married Norma Renton. They have four daughters.

In August 2020, Wygle developed pneumonia. On September 15, 2020, Wygle died in Bellevue, Washington with his family in attendance. Wygle was 96.

== See also ==
- Suzanna Darcy-Henneman
- Alvin M. Johnston
