= July 1924 =

Month of 1924

<<	July 1924					>>
Su	Mo	Tu	We	Th	Fr	Sa
		1	2	3	4	5
6	7	8	9	10	11	12
13	14	15	16	17	18	19
20	21	22	23	24	25	26
27	28	29	30	31

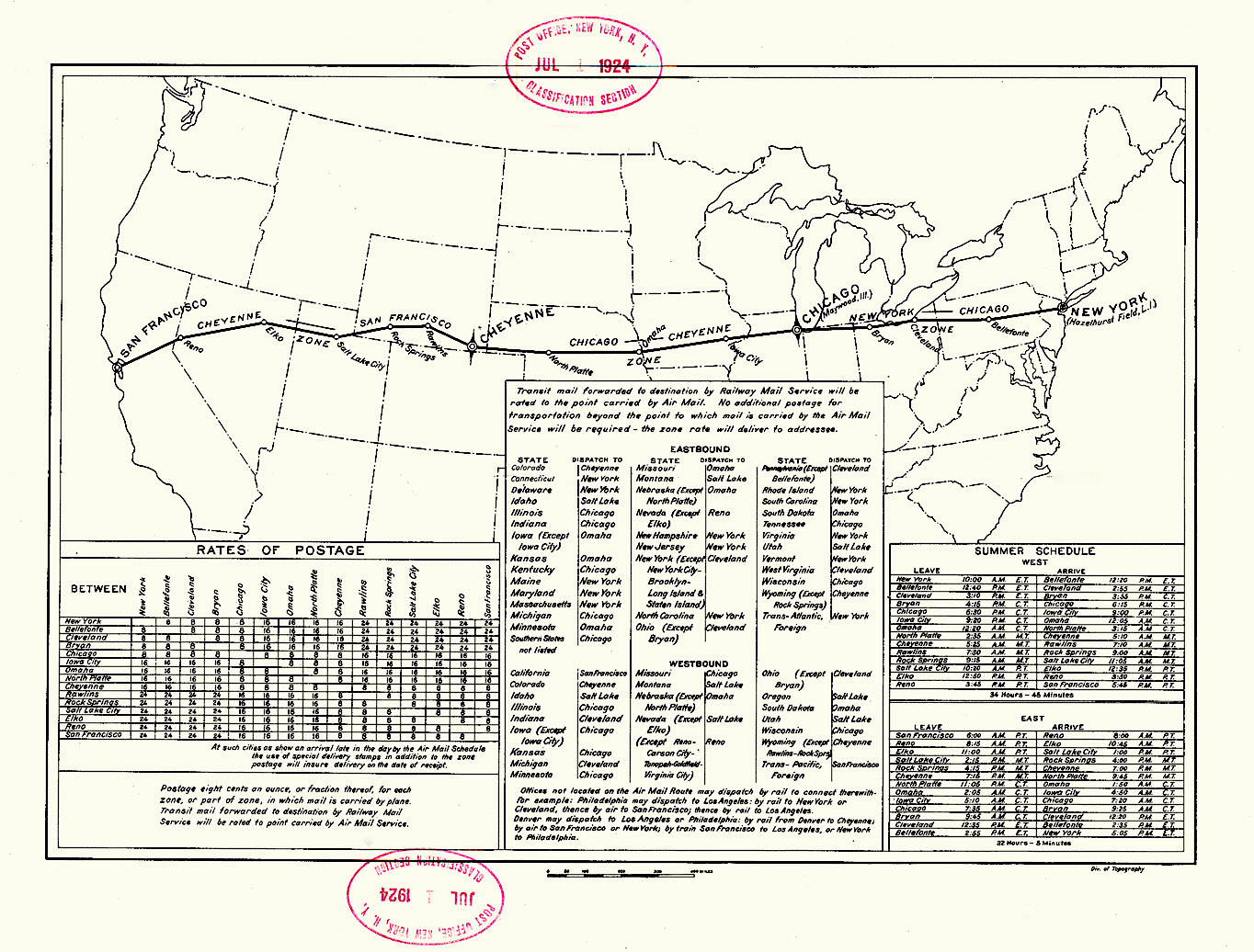
July 1, 1924: U.S. Post Office Department begins day-and-night air mail service

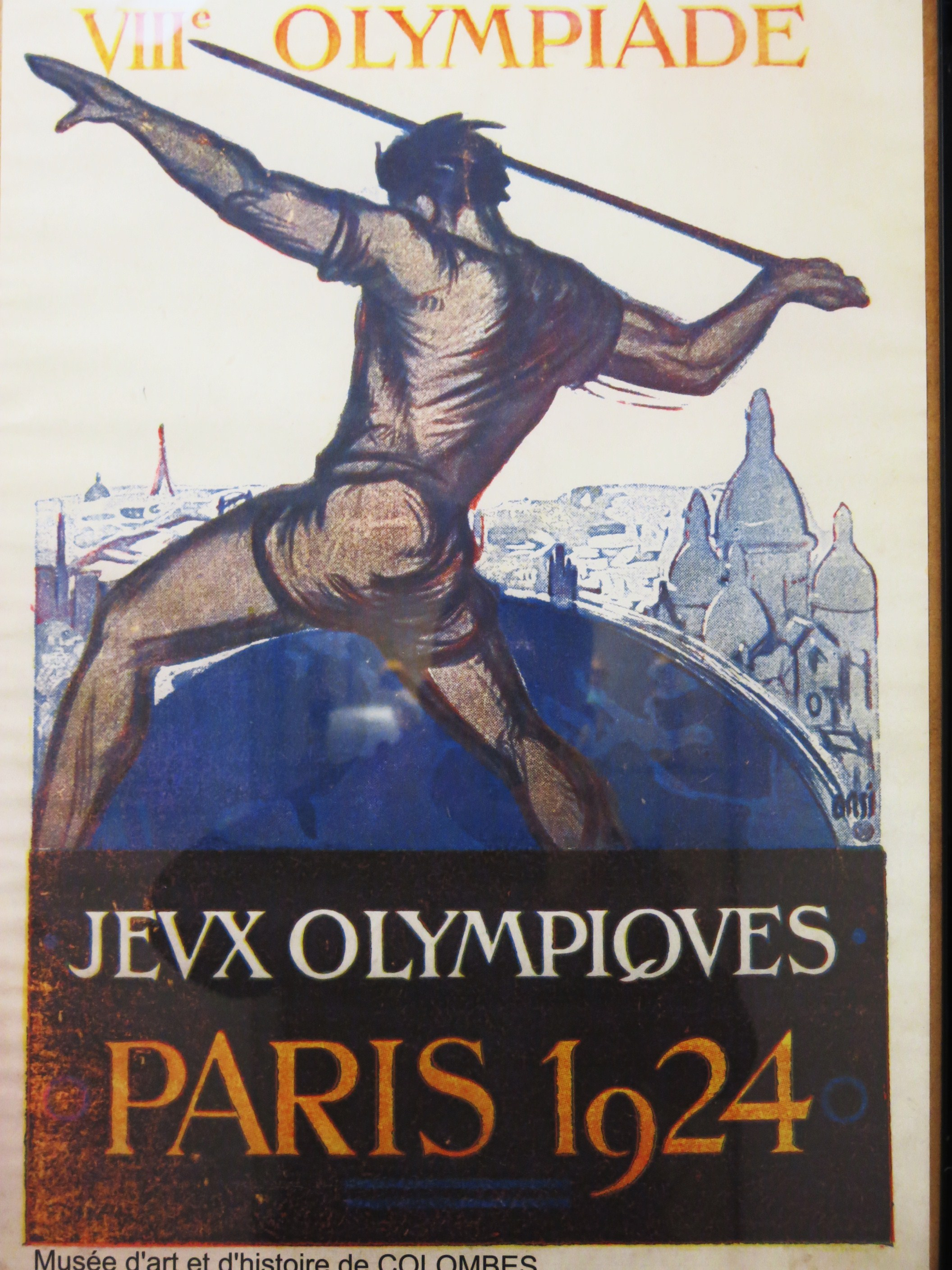
July 5–27, 1924: Summer Olympics held at Paris

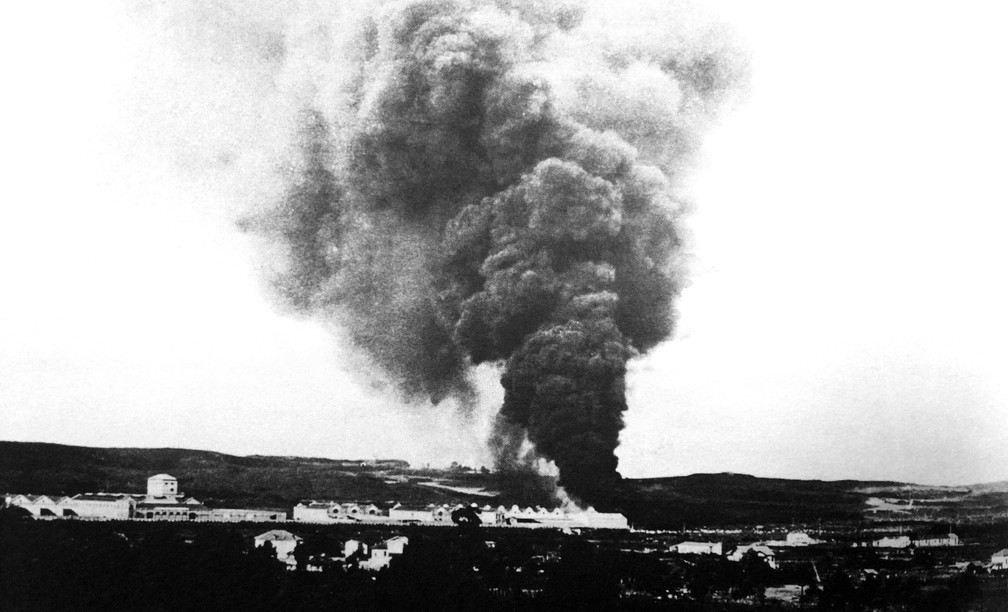
July 5–28, 1924: Brazilian Army bombards São Paulo after rebels seize the city

The following events occurred in July 1924:

== July 1, 1924 (Tuesday) ==
- Full time airmail service began in the U.S. with a fleet of airplanes transporting the mail day and night. The time for sending mail between New York and San Francisco was decreased from 70 hours to a little less than 35 hours westward and around 32 hours eastward. Stops by the airplanes for mail transfer and relief of crew were made at established air stations along the fully-equipped Transcontinental Airway System at New York City; Bellefonte, Pennsylvania; Cleveland and Bryan, Ohio; Chicago; Iowa City; Omaha and North Platte, Nebraska; Cheyenne, Rawlins and Rock Springs, Wyoming; Salt Lake City; Elko and Reno; and San Francisco.
- Japan held a national day of protest of the United States' Immigration Act the day it went into effect. Mass prayer meetings were conducted at Shinto shrines all over the country and an unknown Japanese man cut down the American flag at the U.S. embassy in Tokyo. The Japanese government gave the United States a formal note of regret over the flag theft. The flag was recovered the next day The perpetrator was arrested on July 3 in Osaka and explained that he wanted to do something "heroic" before he died for his country.
- At the Democratic National Convention, William Gibbs McAdoo lost ground in balloting as Al Smith and John W. Davis steadily gained.

== July 2, 1924 (Wednesday) ==
- Portugal's Prime Minister Álvaro de Castro fought a sword duel with Flight Captain Teófilo José Ribeiro da Fonseca over a political dispute. Captain Ribiero was wounded in the arm.
- Inventor Guglielmo Marconi addressed the Royal Society of Arts in London describing his new beam system of short-wave wireless transmission. Marconi said this system could transmit more words per day between distant countries than was possible before, and more economically as well, resulting in a general reduction in telegraphic rates.
- Italian border patrollers shot and killed two Serbian soldiers and wounded a civilian bystander at the Serbian boundary line.

== July 3, 1924 (Thursday) ==
- U.S. Secretary of Commerce Herbert Hoover submitted a paper before the World Power Conference in Wembley, London urging America's power plants to be linked together to save energy.
- Born:
  - S. R. Nathan, president of Singapore 1999 to 2011; in Singapore (d. 2016)
  - Michael Barrington, English television actor known for the situation comedy Porridge; in Twickenham, London (d. 1988)

== July 4, 1924 (Friday) ==
- The Caesar salad was created in Mexico by Italian-born restaurateur Caesar Cardini at his restaurant in Tijuana, Caesar's. According to the Cardini family, Caesar had been unprepared for the large number of Americans crossing the border to legally purchase liquor at his eatery during the long Fourth of July weekend, and conserved his available supply of food by putting together the large salad in the middle of the dining room.
- A new version of the Progressive Party, unrelated to the previous organization nicknamed the "Bull Moose" Party, opened a convention in Cleveland and nominated U.S. Senator Robert M. La Follette of Wisconsin as a third-party candidate for U.S. president.
- British tennis player Kitty McKane Godfree defeated Helen Wills of the U.S. to win the women's singles championship at the Wimbledon.
- Glacier National Park concessions worker Donald T. Fly drowned in Saint Mary Lake.
- Calvin Coolidge, Jr. was reported to be seriously ill.
- Born: Eva Marie Saint, American actress; in Newark, New Jersey (d. 2026)

== July 5, 1924 (Saturday) ==
- The official opening ceremonies for the Summer Olympics were conducted at Colombes Stadium in Paris, France. Germany was absent for the second consecutive Olympics, having not been invited by the Organizing Committee.
- Jean Borotra defeated fellow Frenchman René Lacoste in the Men's Singles Final at Wimbledon.
- Rebellion broke out in the Brazilian city of São Paulo as a group of lieutenants and other junior Brazilian Army officers— the "tenentes"— sought to overthrow President Artur Bernardes.
- Born:
  - Niels Jannasch, German-born Canadian historian; in Holzminden (d. 2001)
  - Osman Lins, Brazilian fiction writer; in Vitória de Santo Antão (d. 1978)
  - János Starker, Hungarian cellist; in Budapest (d. 2013)

== July 6, 1924 (Sunday) ==
- A presidential election was held in Mexico. Plutarco Elías Calles of the Partido Laborista Mexicano won the presidential election with 84.1% of the vote, with 1,340,634 in his favor. Runner-up Angel Flores had 252,599 votes or 15.9%.
- Ville Ritola of Finland won gold in the 10,000m race at the Paris Olympics. Paavo Nurmi, the greatest long-distance runner at the time, had hoped to break a record in the event but Finnish officials refused to enter him in it because they feared for his health if he competed in too many events, a decision that angered Nurmi.
- Born:
  - Robert M. White, U.S. Air Force test pilot who was one of 12 Americans to pilot the North American X-15, and the first person to fly an aircraft at Mach 4, Mach 5 and Mach 6; in New York City (d. 2010)
  - Wesley L. McDonald, U.S. Navy aviator who, in 1965, led the first U.S. air strike against North Vietnam, and in 1983, as an Admiral, was the commander the U.S. invasion of Grenada; in Washington D.C. (d. 2009)
  - Ernest Graves Jr., U.S. Army officer and former Director of the Defense Security Assistance Agency; in New York City (d. 2019)

== July 7, 1924 (Monday) ==
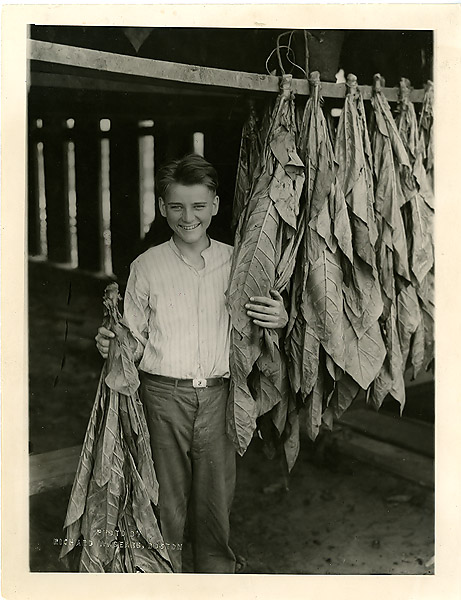
Calvin Coolidge Jr.

- Calvin Coolidge Jr., the 16-year-old son of the President of the United States, died at 10:30 in the morning from sepsis caused by an infection on his foot, developed from blisters after having played a game of tennis on the White House grounds a week earlier. The president and Mrs. Coolidge were at their son's bedside.
- The Philippine Scout Mutiny broke out at Fort William McKinley near Manila, as Filipino members of the U.S. Army, who received lesser pay than the American troops. The rebellion was quickly suppressed by the 23rd Infantry Brigade of the U.S. Army's Philippine Division, commanded by Brigadier General Douglas MacArthur, and 200 of the mutineers were arrested. MacArthur's subsequent attempts to improve the pay and working conditions of Filipino soldiers and officers were unsuccessful.
- British track athlete Harold Abrahams, an English Jew who faced anti-Semitic prejudice, won the 100 meter sprint at the Summer Olympics in Paris. His friend Eric Liddell, a Scottish Christian missionary, had not entered the 100m dash because he had refused to run on a Sunday, the day of the qualifying heats. Abrahams, whose story was profiled in the Academy Award winning 1981 film Chariots of Fire, finished in 10.6 seconds, one-tenth of a second ahead of the heavily-favored entrant from the U.S., Jackson Scholz.
- New York Governor Alfred E. Smith passed former Secretary of the Treasury William Gibbs McAdoo on the 87th ballot at the Democratic National Convention, with 361½ to McAdoo's 333½ before the convention adjourned early out of respect for the President. Neither candidate had 729 votes, the two-thirds majority necessary to be nominated.
- Born:
  - Benedikt Gröndal, Prime Minister of Iceland, 1979 to 1980; in Önundarfjörður (d. 2010)
  - Eddie Romero, Philippine film director; in Dumaguete (d. 2013)
  - Rudolf Pleil, West German serial killer convicted of murdering at least 10 people; in Bärenstein (committed suicide, 1958)

== July 8, 1924 (Tuesday) ==
- At the Democratic National Convention, delegates divided between Alfred E. Smith (who had moved into the front after the 86th ballot) and former frontrunner William G. McAdoo. After a recess following the 93rd ballot, Smith offered to take his name out of contention if McAdoo would do the same. Indiana U.S. Senator Samuel M. Ralston in third place, released his delegates, but McAdoo refused the Smith offer before it could be announced on the floor of the convention. On the 94th ballot, McAdoo took the lead again with 395 over 364.5 for Smith, with John W. Davis moving into third place. Balloting continued past midnight until an adjournment at 4:00 a.m.
- The Communist International in Moscow condemned the U.S. Immigration Act and passed a resolution advocating unrestricted worldwide immigration.
- Died: Walter R. Allman, 40, American comic strip artist who wrote and drew The Doings of the Duffs from its launch in 1914 until 1923, when he suffered a nervous breakdown.

== July 9, 1924 (Wednesday) ==
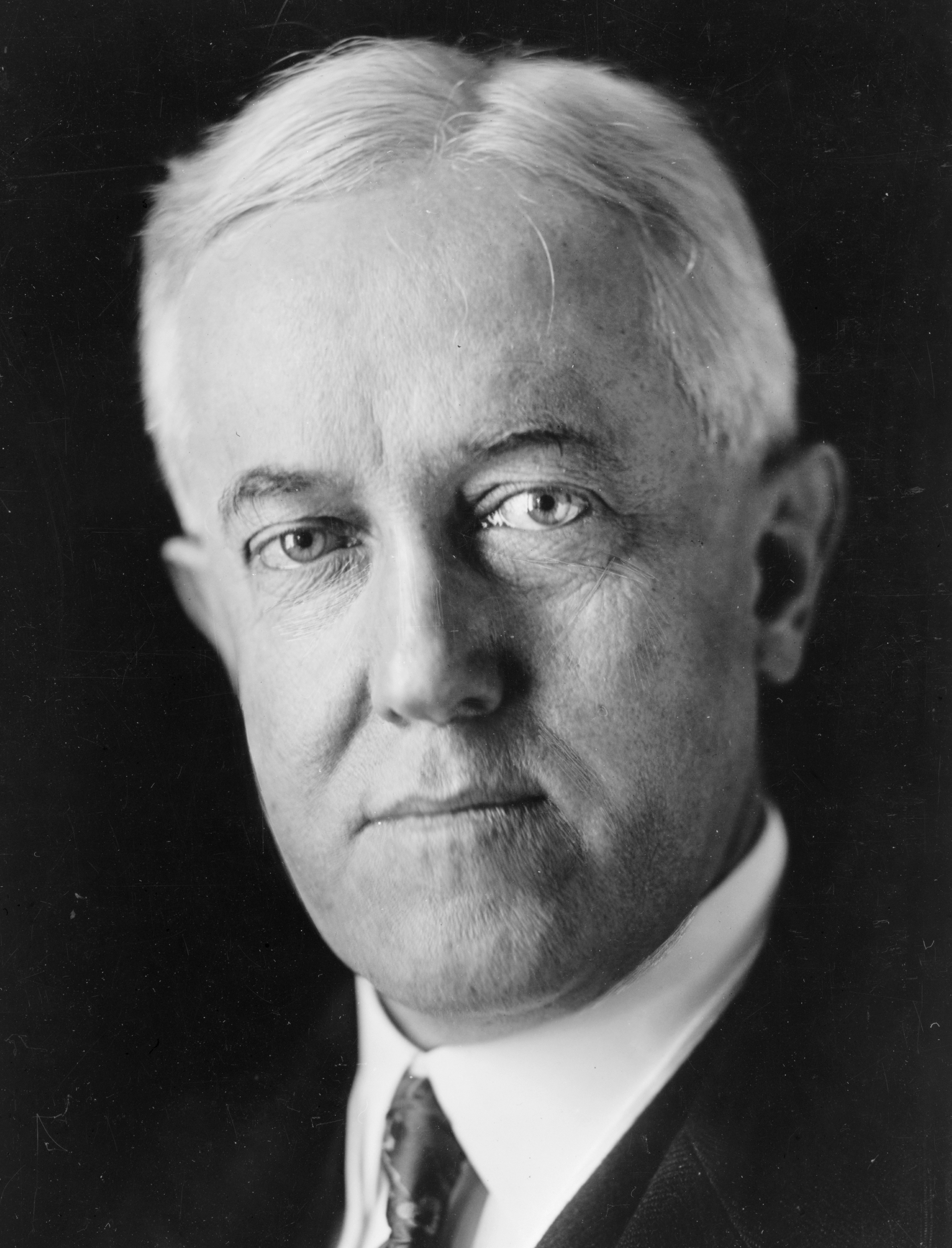
Obscure Democratic nominee John W. Davis

- Little-known former congressman John W. Davis of West Virginia became the surprise winner at the Democratic National Convention, securing the presidential nomination on the 103rd ballot as something of a compromise candidate. Charles W. Bryan of Nebraska earned the nomination for vice president. William Gibbs McAdoo withdrew reluctantly and ungraciously, leaving the Democrats bitterly divided heading into the general campaign.
- Colombia gave diplomatic recognition to the Republic of Panama, more than 20 years after Panama had seceded from Colombia on November 3, 1903, at the encouragement of the United States.
- In voting of members of the Grossdeutsche Volksgemeinschaft (GVD), the right-wing organization formed after the outlawing of the Nazi Party, founder Alfred Rosenberg was ousted and by the more aggressive Julius Streicher as Chairman of the GVD. The GVD, founded on January 1, 1924, would be disbanded by Streicher on March 12, 1925, after the Nazi Party was re-established by Adolf Hitler. Hermann Esser was selected as the Deputy Chairman.
- The funeral for Calvin Coolidge, Jr. in Washington, D.C. Flags were lowered to half-mast and all nonessential government offices closed at 3:30 p.m.
- The aviators trying to circumnavigate the globe flew from Baghdad to Aleppo.
- Born:
  - Mashiur Rahman, Prime Minister of Bangladesh, 1978 to 1979; in Rangpur, Bengal Province, British India (d. 1979)
  - Pierre Cochereau, French organist for the Notre-Dame de Paris, and musical composer; in Saint-Mandé, Val-de-Marne département (d. 1984)

== July 10, 1924 (Thursday) ==
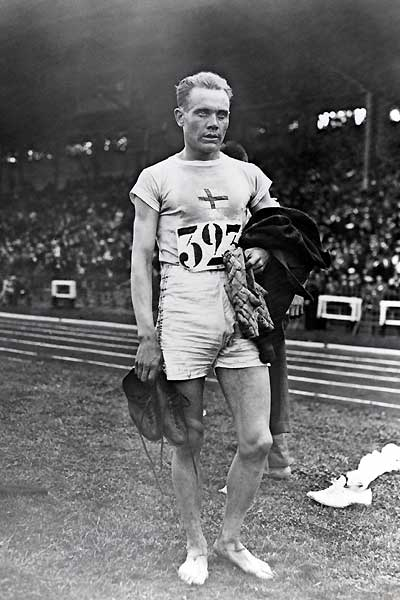
Paavo Nurmi

- Finnish runner Paavo Nurmi performed one of the greatest feats in Olympic history when he won the 1,500m race and the 5,000m race two hours apart.
- Calvin Coolidge, Jr. was buried at the Plymouth Notch Cemetery in Vermont.

== July 11, 1924 (Friday) ==
- The World Energy Council was founded as the World Power Conference at a meeting of the same name in London, where more than 1,700 experts from 40 nations gathered to discuss energy issues. D. N. Dunlop of Scotland, who had organized the conference, was elected as the organization's first secretary-general.
- Born:
  - Brett Somers, Canadian-born U.S. actress, singer and comedian; in Saint John, New Brunswick (d. 2007)
  - Charlie Tully, Northern Irish footballer; in Belfast (d. 1971)
- Died: J. B. van Heutsz, Dutch military officer and former Governor-general of the Dutch East Indies (now Indonesia), known for bringing an end to the Aceh War

== July 12, 1924 (Saturday) ==
- Harold Osborn of the U.S. won the men's decathlon at the Summer Olympics in Paris, finishing ahead of 35 other competitors. Osborn finish first in the 100m dash, the high jump, and the 110m hurdles, and in second place in the long jump and the pole vault.
- Paavo Nurmi won the 10,000m cross-country race at the Olympics and then helped to win another gold medal for Finland in the team event. The races were held in blistering heat of 45 degrees Celsius; cross-country races were never an event at the Olympics again because of the number of runners collapsing from heat exhaustion.
- Driving at 146.16 miles per hour (235.22 km/h) in his Fiat Mephistopheles, Ernest Eldridge of Great Britain broke the land speed record of 145.89 miles per hour (234.79 km/h) set earlier in the week (on Sunday, July 6) by Rene Thomas of France. Both records had been set on a public road at Arpajon, after which the Fédération Internationale de l'Automobile announced that it would only recognize records set on closed racing circuits, bringing an end to attempts to set a land speed record on a roadway used by other motor vehicles.
- The airmen attempting to be the first to fly around the world landed in Bucharest from Constantinople.
- U.S. President Calvin Coolidge recorded a speech on Phonofilm, funded by the Republican National Committee, to be shown to voters in advance of the 1924 U.S. presidential election.
- The original trademark application for Kleenex was filed by Kimberly-Clark Corporation.

== July 13, 1924 (Sunday) ==
- United States administration of the Dominican Republic ended as Horacio Vásquez was inaugurated as President, succeeding the U.S.-selected provisional president Juan Bautista Vicini Burgos.
- The Rex Ingram-directed film The Arab opened at the Capitol Theatre in New York City.
- Born: Carlo Bergonzi, Italian operatic tenor; in Polesine (d. 2014)
- Died: M. Belle Brown, M.D., 76, pioneering female U.S. surgeon and one of the few women during the 19th surgery to be trained to do surgery; she later became the dean of the New York Medical College and Hospital for Women

== July 14, 1924 (Monday) ==
- The short-lived Tungus Republic was proclaimed independent within the Khabarovsk Krai and part of the Yakut Autonomous Soviet Socialist Republic of the Soviet Union in Siberia. Rebels under the command of Mikhail Artemyev had seized the rural town of Nelkan on May 10 and the port of Ayan on June 6.
- A reported 35 people died in forest fires in the U.S. states of Washington, California and Idaho and the Canadian province of British Columbia.
- The premiere of the Harold Child opera Hugh the Drover took place at His Majesty's Theatre, London.
- Aviators attempting to be the first to fly around the world reached Paris, circling over the Arc de Triomphe.
- Born:
  - Libuše Domanínská, Czech soprano opera singer; in Brno, Czechoslovakia (d. 2021)
  - Bill Lair, American military officer and CIA agent in CIA activities in Southeast Asia; in Hilton, Oklahoma (d. 2014)
  - Mal Johnson, American journalist and the first black female White House correspondent; as Malvyn Houser in Philadelphia (d. 2007)
- Died:
  - Isabella Ford, 69, English socialist, feminist, trade unionist and writer
  - Alvey A. Adee, 81, Deputy U.S. Secretary of States since 1886, died four days after his June 30 retirement.

== July 15, 1924 (Tuesday) ==
- The British and Italian governments signed an agreement on the Jubba River in Africa as the British ceded their territory on the northern side; it became Italian Trans-Juba.

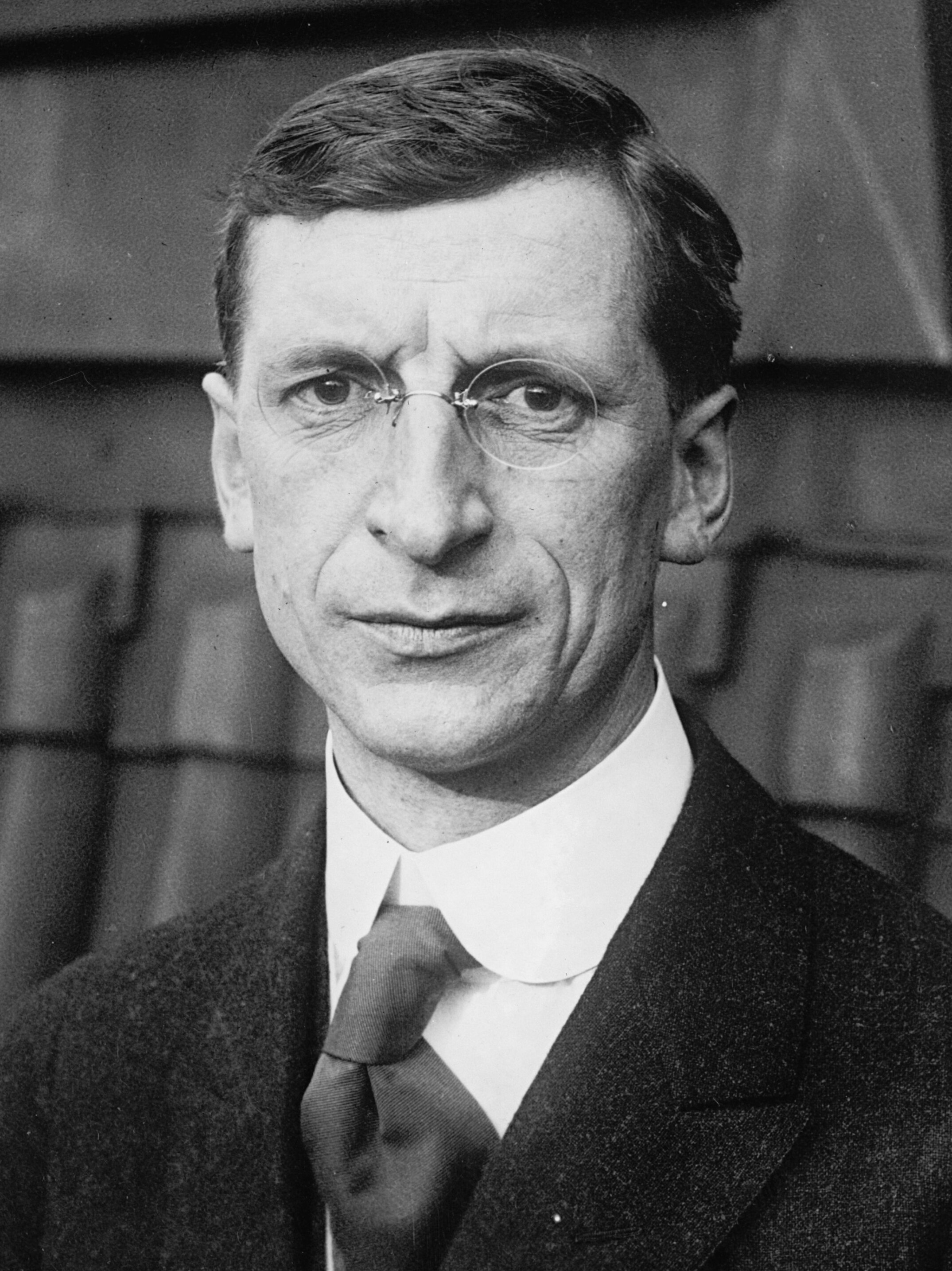
De Valera

- The Irish Free State released Éamon de Valera and other political prisoners.
- The United States Army suspended recruitment after reaching an enlistment strength of 123,793, in excess of the number authorized by Congress which was not to far exceed 120,000.
- Born:
  - Sir David Cox, British statistician who developed the Cox process in probability theory; in Birmingham (d. 2022)
  - Makhmud Esambayev, Soviet Chechen dancer and actor; in Starye Atagi, Chechen Autonomous Oblast, Soviet Union (d. 2000)
- Died: Kuroda Seiki, 61, Japanese painter

== July 16, 1924 (Wednesday) ==
- The first major nationwide news story in the U.S. about a tall, hairy "apeman" that walked upright, in the Pacific Northwest was published in The Oregonian, the largest circulation newspaper in Portland, Oregon, and then picked up by the Associated Press. In 1958, the mysterious creature would first be described as "Bigfoot" because of the large footprints observed after a sighting in northern California.
- The London Reparations Conference opened to arrange for the implementation of the Dawes Plan.
- The airmen trying to make the first aerial circumnavigation of the globe flew from Paris to London.

== July 17, 1924 (Thursday) ==
- USS Barracuda, submarine "twice as large as any built previously for the United States Navy", was launched from the Portsmouth Naval Shipyard at New Hampshire as the first of the new generation of American subs, the V-boats.
- Future Hall of Famer Jesse Haines pitched a no-hitter for the St. Louis Cardinals in a 5–0 win over the Boston Braves.
- Died: Isabella Stewart Gardner, 84, American art collector and philanthropist

== July 18, 1924 (Friday) ==
- U.S. Vice Consul to Iran Robert Imbrie was beaten to death by an angry mob in Tehran after he photographed a gathering at a sacred watering place where a miracle was said to have taken place. Police were slow to help because they were intimidated by the soldiers of the Cossack Brigade, the real authority in Iran, who were participating in the attack. American oilman Melvin Seymour was also badly beaten in the attack but survived.

== July 19, 1924 (Saturday) ==
- The Napalpí massacre occurred in Argentina when 400 indigenous Toba people were killed by Argentine police and ranchers.
- Montana Senator Burton K. Wheeler was announced as the vice presidential nominee of the Progressive Party and running mate of presidential nominee Robert M. La Follette.
- Pitcher Herman "Hi" Bell of the St. Louis Cardinals started and finished a doubleheader baseball game, pitching all 9 innings of a 6 to 1 win over the Boston Braves and all 9 innings of the second game of the day, a 2 to 1 win. Bell was the last Major League Baseball pitcher to pitch all 18 innings of two games on the same day.
- Born:
  - Petras Griškevičius, Lithuanian Soviet leader who served as the de facto ruler of the Lithuanian SSR as General Secretary of the Lithuanian Communist Party from 1974 until his death; in Kriaunos (d. 1987)
  - Stanley K. Hathaway, U.S. Secretary of the Interior in 1975, Governor of Wyoming, 1967 to 1975; in Osceola, Nebraska (d. 2005)
  - Pat Hingle, American character actor on stage, film and TV; in Miami (d. 2009)
- Died: Kingsley Fairbridge, 39, British educator and founder of the Society for the Furtherance of Child Emigration to the Colonies (later the Fairbridge Society) died of complications after minor surgery for removal of a lymphatic tumor

== July 20, 1924 (Sunday) ==
- Tehran was placed under martial law due to high tensions over the death of Robert Imbrie.
- Ottavio Bottecchia of Italy won the Tour de France.
- FIDE (Fédération Internationale des Échecs), the International Chess Federation that would oversee championship competition, was founded in Paris.
- The Soviet sports newspaper Sovetsky Sport was founded.
- Born: Tatyana Lioznova, Soviet Russian film director; in Moscow (d. 2011)

== July 21, 1924 (Monday) ==
- 'The Pageant of Empire: An Historical Epic' began at Empire Stadium in Wembley, London as the highlight of the British Empire Exhibition. Directed by Frank Lascelles, the pageant featured 15,000 people, 300 horses, 500 donkeys, 730 camels, 72 monkeys, 1,000 doves, seven elephants, three bears and one macaw, and featured musical tributes to events in British history and to different countries of the Empire.
- The Leopold and Loeb trial began as defense lawyer Clarence Darrow told the Illinois court that his clients were entering pleas of guilty.
- The Ponce-Castro Oyanguren Protocol was signed in Ecuador between Ecuador's Foreign Minister Nicolas Clemente Ponce and Peruvian Ambassador Enrique Castro Oyanguren to resolve a border dispute between the two South American nations.

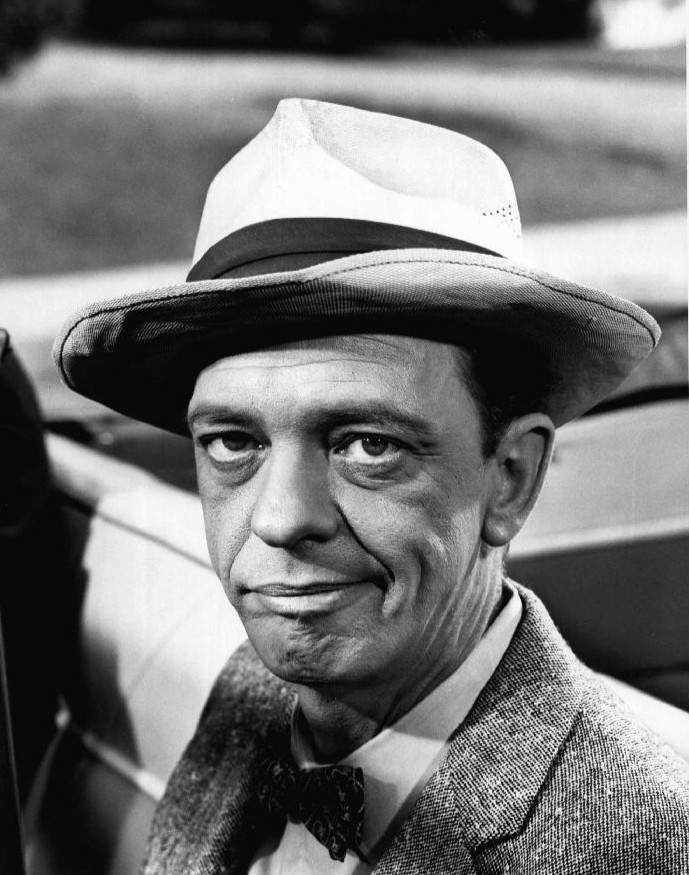
Knotts

- Born: Don Knotts, American comedian, TV and film actor best known for The Andy Griffith Show, for which he won five Emmy Awards for Best Supporting Actor; as Jesse Donald Knotts in Morgantown, West Virginia (d. 2006)
- Died: Johnny Tom Gleeson, 90, Irish poet and songwriter best known for the Irish ballad "Thady Quill"

== July 22, 1924 (Tuesday) ==
- Paris Olympics organizer Pierre de Coubertin lashed back at criticism of the games, calling the Paris press guilty of "magnifying the unpleasant incidents instead of fulfilling its duty and educating the people to a big sport ideal." He also said it was "idiotic" of the French government to build Colombes Stadium so far outside of Paris without the proper transportation facilities. Some of the unfortunate incidents referred to included the French booing of the American flag at a rugby match and complaints over accommodations in the tennis tournament.
- Japan passed an amendment to its Nationality Law so that Japanese children born in the United States and other jus soli countries would automatically lose their Japanese nationality unless it was expressly retained within 14 days of birth. The amendment also allowed dual citizens in those countries to easily renounce their Japanese citizenship.
- Died: Albert Bruce-Joy, 81, Irish sculptor

== July 23, 1924 (Wednesday) ==
- After Norway's parliament, the Storting, rejected a government plan for banning alcohol sale, Prime Minister Abraham Berge of Norway and his entire cabinet announced their resignations.
- Twenty children were trampled to death and 17 injured as patrons fled a movie house in Veracruz, Mexico when the film caught fire.
- The collapse of seats in a storm injured 20 people at a minor league baseball game in Newton, Kansas.
- The first official flag of the U.S. state of Washington was unveiled at the office of the Washington Secretary of State at Olympia.
- The judge in the Leopold and Loeb case fully explained to the defendants the consequences of pleading guilty and asked them to confirm their plea, which they did. The trial now became a question of whether or not the killers would receive the death penalty.
- Died: Frank Frost Abbott, 84, American classical scholar

== July 24, 1924 (Thursday) ==
- Themistoklis Sofoulis took office as the new Prime Minister of Greece, as Alexandros Papanastasiou stepped down. Sofoulis would serve less than three months, stepping down on November 27.
- World light heavyweight boxing champion Gene Tunney defeated Georges Carpentier by technical knockout at the beginning of the fifteenth round at the Polo Grounds in New York.
- Died: Palmer Cox, 84, Canadian illustrator and author

== July 25, 1924 (Friday) ==
- A new Norwegian government was sworn in under Prime Minister Johan Ludwig Mowinckel following the resignation of the previous cabinet two days earlier.
- The new issue of Workers' Weekly, the newspaper of the Communist Party of Great Britain, included a provocative article entitled "An Open Letter to the Fighting Forces" which included passages such as, "Neither in a class war nor in a military war, will you turn your guns on your fellow workers", and, "Turn your weapons on your oppressors." The question of whether to charge editor J. R. Campbell with incitement to mutiny became a controversial issue known as the Campbell Case.
- Greece announced it was expelling 50,000 Armenians from the country.
- American League president Ban Johnson ordered umpires to speed up baseball games by cutting short trivial arguments about balls and strikes as well as preventing players from taking too much time inspecting balls on suspicion they had been tampered with.
- Born: Frank Church, U.S. Senator for Idaho; in Boise, Idaho (d. 1984)
- Died: Azem Galica, 34, Albanian nationalist and rebel who fought for the unification of Kosovo with Albania, died of wounds sustained in fighting soldiers of the Kingdom of Yugoslavia, bringing about the collapse of the ethnic Albanian rebellion.

== July 26, 1924 (Saturday) ==
- Argentine pilot Pedro Zanni and mechanic Felipe Beltrame began their attempt to fly around the world, departing Amsterdam in a Fokker C-IV biplane named Ciudad de Buenos Aires.
- Boxer Larry Estridge of the British West Indies became the last person to win the World Colored Middleweight Championship, after defeating title holder Panama Joe Gans in a 10-round bout at Yankee Stadium. Afterward, separate titles for African-American and white boxers would be abandoned.
- The Ku Klux Klan staged a large rally in Issaquah, Washington, drawing at least 13,000 people.
- Born:
  - Dirk de Villiers, South African filmmaker; in Douglas, Northern Cape (d. 2009)
  - Saville Sax, American drifter who assisted the espionage activities of his friend, Theodore Hall by delivering classified nuclear secrets to Soviet spies; in New York City (d. 1980). Although their access to materials was blocked, the two were never charged or prosecuted out of concern that the Soviets would learn that U.S. cryptanalysts were decoding Soviet cables.
- Died: Manuel Araullo, 71, Chief Justice of the Philippines since 1921

== July 27, 1924 (Sunday) ==
- The closing ceremonies of the Summer Olympics were conducted at Colombes Stadium in Paris. The United States led the final medal count with 45 gold medals.
- Lieutenant Doxakis, a Greek Army officer in charge of enforcing martial law in the Kato Nevrokopi region on the border of Bulgaria, carried out the massacre of 17 Bulgarian peasants arrested in the village of Tarlis (now Vathytopos), near the Greco-Bulgarian border. Lieutenant Doxakis told his commander that their 10-soldier unit had come under attack from Bulgarian guerrillas and that they were forced to kill the prisoners who were attempting to escape.
- The first Stånga Games were held on the Swedish island of Gotland as an annual competition of traditional Swedish Gothic sports, including pärk, a team game similar to a cross between baseball and football; varpa, similar to horseshoe pitching; Herre på stång (a fight between two men on a pole) and three variations of tug of war.
- Born:
  - Anthony Acevedo, Mexican-American U.S. Army medic who documented his incarceration as a prisoner of war in Berga concentration camp in Germany and gave first-hand accounts of the treatment of Jews in the Nazi death camps; in San Bernardino, California (d. 2018)
  - Mohsen Vaziri-Moghaddam, Iranian abstract expressionist painter and sculptor; in Tehran (d. 2018)
- Died: Ferruccio Busoni, 58, Italian pianist and composer

== July 28, 1924 (Monday) ==
- The secret "May Manifesto" of the Internal Macedonian Revolutionary Organisation (IMRO) was published after IMRO leader Todor Aleksandrov refused to cooperate with the Soviet Union's wishes for IMRO to join Comintern. Alexandrov claimed the publication was a forgery.
- The revolt by Brazilian Army officers in São Paulo ended after the rebels quietly withdrew to Campinas. By the time that the government realized that the rebels had quit, the last rebels had been gone from the city for five hours. The city was recaptured by the government, at a cost of more than 500 deaths and almost 5,000 injuries. Sao Paulo state governor Carlos de Campos, who had fled the city on July 8, returned to his office later in the day.
- Ljubomir Davidović became Prime Minister of Yugoslavia after Nikola Pašić resigned.
- Born:
  - Anne Braden, American civil rights activist; in Louisville, Kentucky (d. 2006)
  - Vishwanath N. Nadkarni, Indian financier and Chairman of the State Bank of India, 1983 to 1984 (d. 2016)

== July 29, 1924 (Tuesday) ==
- The practicality of airmail was demonstrated for the public when the U.S. Army air service carried a cargo of mail from Nashville, Tennessee to Chicago in 2 hours and 29 minutes.
- Germany and the Soviet Union signed a trade agreement which ended the two-month standoff over the Berlin police raid.
- Born:
  - Elizabeth Short, murder victim known as "the Black Dahlia"; in Hyde Park, Boston, Massachusetts (d. 1947)
  - Robert Horton, American TV actor who was the star of Wagon Train after the death of Ward Bond; in Los Angeles (d. 2016)
  - Richard P. Keirn, American fighter pilot and the first U.S. airman to have his plane shot by a surface-to-air missile in the Vietnam War, and one of only two Americans to be a prisoner of war in both World War II and in Vietnam; in Akron, Ohio (d. 2000)

== July 30, 1924 (Wednesday) ==
- The prosecution rested in the Leopold and Loeb trial.
- The round-the-world flyers reached Kirkwall in the Orkney Islands.
- Died: Arthur McCabe, 37, Australian rugby player, died of a heart attack

== July 31, 1924 (Thursday) ==
- The Commonwealth Electoral Act 1924, requiring compulsory voting in Australian national elections, was given royal assent by George V in his capacity as King of Australia. The law, in effect 100 years later, provides for a requirement that enrolled voters explain their absence if they fail to vote, and a fine of up to A$170 if no adequate excuse is given. The Act was sponsored after fewer than 60% of voters cast ballots in the 1922 federal election; participation increased to 91% in 1925 election.
- The Allied Reparations Commission released a report estimating that Germany had only paid about half the amounts that the French, Belgians and English demanded for occupying the Rhineland and Ruhr.
- Died: Cecil Holliday, 67, British English activist in China who served as chairman of the Shanghai Municipal Council in 1906.
