= Paulette Cherici-Porello =

Monegasque writer and poet (1924–2018)

Paulette Cherici-Porello (27 August 1924 – 21 September 2018) was a Monegasque writer and poet. She was known as the only female author in Monegasque language and was considered the most important living writer of Monegasque literature. She was the first female president of the National Committee for Monegasque Traditions, and the president of the Union of Monegasque Women.

== Life ==
Paulette Cherici-Porello was born on 27 August 1924. She was a direct descendant of one of about thirty original Ligurian families who founded the Principality of Monaco settling there in the thirteenth century. Cherici-Porello's parents spoke Monegasque fluently: her father was one of the Monegasque native speakers interviewed in the 1940s by Prof. Arveiller of Paris to create the first Monegasque-French dictionary. Not much is known about her early years. Cherici-Porello lived in Fontvieille.

Since 1974, Cherici-Porello as a member the National Committee for Monegasque Traditions organized dialectology conferences with the participation of such renowned linguists as Raymond Arveiller, Charles Rostaing, René Jouveau, Louis Michel, Armand Lunel, André Compan, Emilio Azaretti, Giulia Petraco-Siccardi and RP Louis Frolla and Canon Georges Franzi.

== Work ==
In 1986, Cherici-Porello published her first collection of poems and stories “Mésccia”. Currently the book is out of print and unavailable in shops and libraries, but it's planned to be republished. The second book “Antebrün” was published in 2012.

Cherici-Porello was highly appreciated as a Monegasque writer and poet. Prince Albert II of Monaco spoke of her literary contribution as “the enrichment of our literary heritage, the safeguard of our language and at the same time the base of our identity and the roots of our future”.

From 1984 to 2006, Cherici-Porello was a member of the jury of the Monegasque language competition. She was the first female president of the National Committee for Monegasque Traditions and president of the Union of Monegasque Women. In 2018, Cherici-Porello was a president of Academy of Dialectal Languages.

In 2012, Cherici-Porello was invited as a Monegasque poet to represent Monaco at London's Cultural Olympiad, but she declined the invitation saying she didn't feel up to travel. At that time she was 86 years old and lived in an elderly person's home, therefore traveling by plane would be very difficult for her.

Paulette Cherici-Porello died on 21 September 2018 at the age of 94.
