= Trude Feldman =

American journalist (1924–2022)

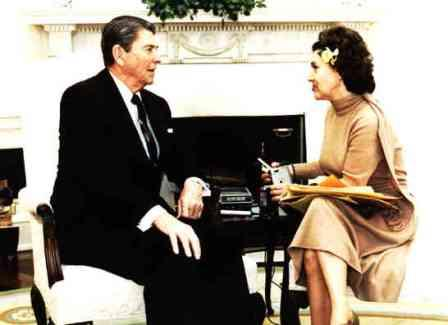
- President Ronald Reagan interviewed by correspondent Feldman
- Born: Gertrude Bella Feldman; August 13, 1924; Los Angeles, California, U.S.
- Died: January 23, 2022 (aged 97); Washington, D.C., U.S.
- Occupation: Journalist
- Years active: 1961–2007

Gertrude Bella Feldman (August 13, 1924 – January 23, 2022) was an American reporter, columnist, and member of the White House Press Corps and State Department Press Corps. She regularly wrote for McCall's magazine and for The New York Times Syndicate, The Washington Post, as well as numerous other media, especially publications for the Jewish community. Feldman interviewed every U.S. president from Lyndon B. Johnson until George W. Bush; and every U.S. vice president from Hubert Humphrey to Al Gore. She was a contributing editor for World Tribune.com.

== Early and personal life ==
Gertrude Bella Feldman was born in Los Angeles on August 13, 1924. Her father was a rabbi and her mother was an author who wrote about Judaism. Feldman was a teacher at Hebrew schools in New York and Los Angeles, and worked on the 1960 film Exodus as both a Hebrew language coach and an extra.

Feldman lived in Washington, D.C., and died there on January 23, 2022, at the age of 97. She was remembered by the Jerusalem Post as being, "known for her ubiquity, her grandmotherly affect, and her relentlessly softball questions affording her the company of the powerful."

== Career ==
Feldman began her career in journalism with the coverage of the trial of Adolf Eichmann 1961–62. She retired in 2007.

=== Presidential correspondent ===
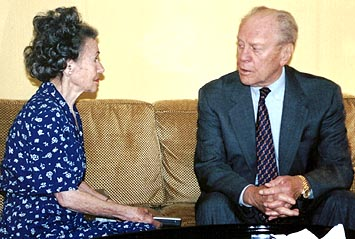
Gerald Ford interviewed by Trude B. Feldman

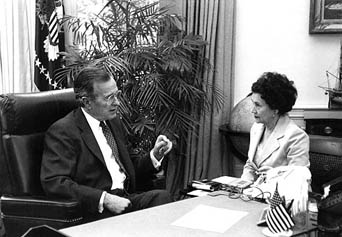
George H. W. Bush interviewed by Trude B. Feldman

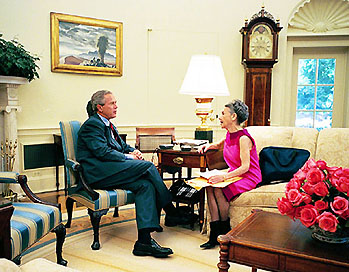
George W. Bush interviewed by Trude B. Feldman

Feldman interviewed every American president from Lyndon B. Johnson to George W. Bush (including Harry Truman, in his post presidential years (1968, 1971, 1972).

President Jimmy Carter, in a 1977 interview with Feldman, hinted that efforts to promote an Arab-Israeli settlement might have to be suspended. Carter elaborated on this new approach in another interview with her that startled the Arabs. It was a generous face-saving offer to the Prime Minister of Israel Menachem Begin by Carter, giving Israel the opportunity to accept the notions of withdrawal from the West Bank and of participation by the Palestinians in a gradual, limited process of self-determination.

As his 75th birthday approached, Ronald Reagan scheduled an interview with Feldman on the afternoon of January 28, 1986. At 11:38 that morning, however, the Space Shuttle Challenger disintegrated after liftoff, killing its crew of seven. While the president postponed his State of the Union speech, which had been scheduled for that evening, he did not postpone the interview.

Feldman covered George H. W. Bush from when he became a congressman from Texas in 1967. She interviewed him as U.S. Ambassador to the United Nations, as vice president, and as president. Her 3-part series — "George Bush at 75" — was published in The Wall Street Journal beginning on February 5, 1996, was internationally syndicated, and was inserted in the Congressional Record by Senators Richard Lugar and Joseph I. Lieberman. She also interviewed Bush in 1993, and again after a 10-day mission to the Middle East.

President Bill Clinton granted his first post-apology interview to Feldman, who did not ask him about the scandal, but about the Yom Kippur tradition of the Day of Atonement. On August 1, 1996, the Wall Street Journal Opinion Page published a Feldman interview with President Clinton in which he said:

But the truth is, no one knows what the optimum rate of growth without inflation is. The only thing I've tried to do in dealing with the Federal Reserve was to show that I would be responsible in getting the deficit down, but I didn't want to get in the way of economic growth.

In her October 2004 interview with President George W. Bush, he said, "The true history of my administration will be written 50 years from now, and you and I will not be around to see it".

=== State Department correspondent ===
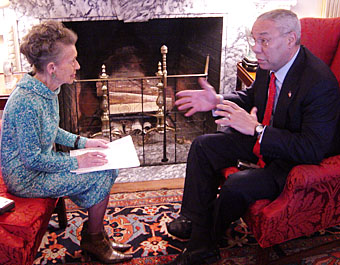
Colin Powell interviewed by Trude B. Feldman

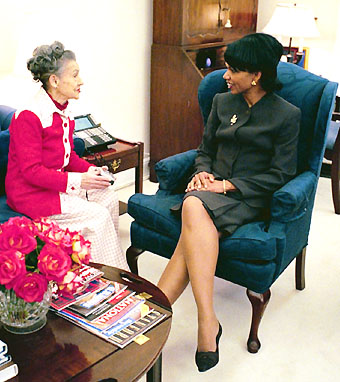
Condoleezza Rice interviewed by Trude B. Feldman

Feldman interviewed every U.S. Secretary of State, from Dean Rusk to Colin L. Powell. (Her interview with Condoleezza Rice was conducted in the White House when she was U.S. National Security Advisor, soon to become the 66th Secretary of State.)

=== Middle East writings ===
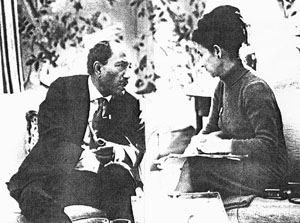
Anwar Sadat interviewed by Trude B. Feldman, 1981

Feldman wrote from, and about, the Middle East since she covered the 122 sessions of the trial of Adolf Eichmann in Jerusalem. There, and in Haifa, and in Cyprus, she was an 'extra' in the film Exodus. Later, she accompanied former First Lady Eleanor Roosevelt on her five-day Middle East trip – her last before her death in 1962.

On Mideast issues, Feldman interviewed every Israeli prime minister, including the first, David Ben-Gurion, to Ariel Sharon, with the exception of Ehud Olmert.

Four months after Anwar Sadat's historical 1977 peace mission to Jerusalem, he and his wife Jehan visited Washington, DC, where both were interviewed by Feldman at Blair House.

=== Controversy ===
Feldmen's writings were generally positive, upbeat, and friendly to her interview subjects. However, they occasionally ventured into controversial territory. In a December 1985 article for the Dallas Morning News, "McFarlane casualty of power", she reported on the resignation of National Security Adviser Robert C. "Bud" McFarlane, attributing the departure to

...subordinates whose efforts to protect their bosses with excessive zeal often hinder constructive advice and input.

Too often, staff members, rather than working for a high official, act as if they "own" him. Such possessiveness results in abuse of authority, creates obstacles and leads to misconceptions. ...

McFarlane did not volunteer the real reasons — persistent malevolence and belligerancy within the administration which resulted in the undermining of policies.

Her interview articles on the Middle East were not just friendly to Israeli leaders, but to Arab leaders as well, and she gently argued for open dialogue and an even-handed approach to a just and lasting peace in the region.

In March 2001, Feldman had her press pass suspended for 90 days for having looked through a press aide's desk late at night.

== See also ==
- J Street
- Brit Tzedek v'Shalom
- Americans for Peace Now
- Jewish Voice for Peace
- Council for the National Interest
- Israel lobby in the United States
