= Elizabeth Avery Colton =

American educator (1872–1924)

- Born: Elizabeth Avery Colton; December 30, 1872; Choctaw Nation, Indian Territory, United States
- Died: August 24, 1924 (aged 51); Cliffton Springs, New York, United States

Elizabeth Avery Colton (/stoʊ/; December 30, 1872 – August 24, 1924) was an educator and an advocate for women's colleges. She is best known for her publications on the improvement of women's colleges, such as The Various Types of Southern Colleges for Women and Standards of Southern Colleges for Women. In The History of the American Association of University Women, Colton is honored for pioneering a new era for women's colleges.

== Early life and education ==
Elizabeth Avery Colton was born on December 30, 1872, in the Choctaw Nation's part of Indian Territory, later to become the state of Oklahoma. She was the eldest of the eight children of James Hooper Colton and Eloise Avery Colton. Colton's paternal grandfather moved the family from Massachusetts to North Carolina in his early years. He was both a minister and a teacher. On her mother's side were some of great leaders of the North Carolina state, especially the notable Waightstill Avery. As Mary Lynch Johnson notes, Colton thus came from a long line of "religious and educational heritage"

=== College and teaching ===
Colton's ambition always included attending college. Although "her own and her family's financial needs forced her to alternate study with teaching school, beginning as early as the age of sixteen." She began her college education at Statesville Female College (now known as Mitchell Community College) in North Carolina. She soon pursued another degree at Mount Holyoke College, but had to prepare and study for an additional year before qualifying for admission; her A.B. from Statesville had not prepared her for college-level work at all. Biographer Mary Lynch Johnson writes of how this "Dismaying experience. . . [first] opened her eyes to the deplorable state of most colleges for women in the South." Colton spent two years (1891 to 1893) at Mount Holyoke until the death of her father brought her back home.

For the next six years, Elizabeth Avery Colton taught at Queens College (now Queens University of Charlotte) in Charlotte, North Carolina. She then decided to pursue a degree in Teaching from Columbia University. By 1903, she had her B.S. in teaching and by 1905, she has her Masters. After she getting her two degrees, Colton taught at Wellesley College for three years. By 1908, she moved back to North Carolina to pursue a job as the head of the English department at Baptist University for Women (now called Meredith College). She required "substantial work" of her students, was reportedly "sarcastic" and "merciless to the lazy" but helped whoever was willing to try. Through her work at many different women's colleges, she saw that educational standards there were too lax. Thus, Elizabeth Avery Colton's advocacy for the improvement of women's colleges in the South began.

== Advocacy for women's colleges ==
Elizabeth Avery Colton, from the age of thirty six until her early death at the age of 51, fought for the betterment of women's colleges. She soon became a leading advocate for this change. She was appointed the chairman of the Southern Association for College Women, which was organized in 1903. Later, in 1914, Colton became the organization's president. The Southern Association for College Women strongly believed that the success of the nation depended on furthering the education of women. In an address from the institution, they state, "We have everything that is necessary for the commercial and industrial development of a great people." With all the resources that the South held, the women's education of the time should have been much better. At least that is what the Southern Association for College Women, as well as Elizabeth Avery Colton, believed.

Colton's most notable work, however, is the study she conducted on colleges for women. In one of her works titled Improvement in Standards of Southern Colleges since 1900, Colton highlights the rapid growth of accredited colleges. She notes how, "By 1915...at least one hundred and sixty Southern colleges and universities announced standard admission requirements."" This was impressive compared to the mere three colleges that were accredited in 1900. Colton had many other studies done as well. The Various Types of Southern Colleges for Women (1916) proved the most influential, with 4,000 graduating high school girls receiving copies. In the study, Colton proposed six categories of institutions, from "Standard Colleges" to "Imitation and Nominal Colleges." She classified 124 colleges by this scheme and commented upon them.

Colton also found that by sharing her teaching methods, she could publicize the best ways to teach women. For example, Colton wrote, "Whenever a student misspells a word in a paper, test, or examination, she is required within a reasonable time to hand in a statement showing that she has found the word in her general reading at least ten times. This often necessitates a great deal of reading expressly for finding the word in question." Through Elizabeth Avery Colton's surveys, as well as her general advice, she was able to help shape the way women were taught in higher education.

== List of works ==
- "Standards of Southern Colleges for Women" (1911)
- "The Approximate Value of Recent Degrees from Southern Colleges" (1912)
- "Improvement in Standards of Southern Colleges since 1900" (1915)
- "The Various Types of Southern Colleges for Women" (1916)

== Later life ==
Elizabeth Avery Colton fought for the improvement of women's colleges in the South until her health no longer allowed her to. In just ten years, she was able to publish a great volume of works on the cause she fought so dearly for. However, her health declined rather rapidly by the 1920s. "Leaving Meredith College in 1920 because of illness, Miss Colton spent the last three years of her life at a sanatorium in Clifton Springs, N.Y." On August 14, 1924, Elizabeth Avery Colton died in Clifton Springs, New York because of a spinal tumor. She was buried in Forest Hill Cemetery in Morganton, North Carolina.
