= Suzanna Darcy-Henneman =

American test pilot

Susan Darcy
- Born: 1956 (age 69–70)
- Education: University of Washington
- Known for: Boeing's first female test pilot
- Aviation career
- Rank: Captain

Suzanna Darcy-Henneman (some sources say her name is Susan Darcy) is a Boeing test pilot and lead test pilot of Boeing 777 program. She was a pilot of a record-breaking 21,602.22 km flight from Hong Kong to London over the Pacific Ocean, America, and the Atlantic on November 9, 2005 in a Boeing 777-200LR. She joined Boeing in 1974, spent seven years as engineer, became trainer of airline pilots, and in 1985 was named Boeing Production Test pilot.

She graduated from the University of Washington in 1981 with a Bachelor of Science degree in Aeronautics and Aeronautical Engineering.

== Career ==
She joined the Boeing company in 1974 as an assistant engineer, but was inspired to fly and began to take lessons in 1977. Around the same time, she attended the University of Washington to study aeronautics and astronautics, graduating with a Bachelor of Science degree in 1981. The following year, she was promoted at Boeing to an instructor in the training department. This job involved training pilots in how the aeroplanes functioned and writing parts of the operations manuals.

She was promoted to a test pilot position on October 31, 1985. This made her the first female test pilot employed by the company. In 1986, she was one of the speakers at the first World Aviation Education and Safety Congress, held in New Delhi. Over the next three years, Darcy accrued accreditation on the Boeing 737, 757 and 767. When she was accredited for the Boeing 747-400 in 1989, she was the first woman to Captain that type of plane. Her job also involved testing prototype planes, and on occasion, flying them to overseas buyers. By 1991, she remained one of two female test pilots for Boeing, alongside Rose Looper who joined shortly after her. She was part of the promotional Asian tour of the Boeing 777 in 1995, and was part of the team who flew a plane from Bangkok, Thailand, to Seattle in a world record time.

Suzanna appears in Season 1 Episode 1 “Flight” of Bill Nye the Science Guy in 1993 as a test pilot for Boeing.
