= Chief E. O. Ashamu =

Nigerian landowner

Chief Emmanuel Oyedele Ashamu (1924 - 1992) commonly known as Chief E. O. Ashamu or The Mayo of Oyo was a Nigerian land owner and Oyo Chief who was prominent in the Nigerian business sector during the 1960s - 1990s. He was a pharmacist by training and was the owner of Industrial Chemists Ltd, Lagos. He rose to become one of the most prominent businessmen in Africa, with interests in agriculture, banking, transportation and real estate.

== Early life and education ==
Chief Ashamu was born on 14 August 1924, to Chief Agbaakin Ashamu of Oyo, a Yoruba tribal chief in Western Nigeria. He attended Durbar School, Oyo, and the Grammar School, Ilesha. He later studied Pharmacy at Yaba Higher College, graduating in 1951.

== Business career ==
He started work with the Nigerian government as a pharmacist at the Orthopaedic Hospital, he later left and joined Lion Chemists as a manager. In 1954, he became the managing director of Industrial Chemists in Lagos. Chief Ashamu was a pharmacist by training and was later the owner of Industrial Chemists Ltd, Lagos, among many other prosperous businesses.

He was board director of Oke-Afa Farms, Oyo Feeds Corporation and the Nigerian Explosives and Plastic Company, all of which he had majority shareholding. In the 60s, he delved into the real estate sector and was involved in land development including Ire Akari estate, Alausa Lagos and many areas of the Yoruba land. His landed property spanned across Nigeria, the United Kingdom and the United States of America.

He was also the owner of Igbeti Marbles: there are two types of marble available in Igbeti; the pure white marble and the gray white marble. Both are of very high quality with about 98% purity. The Ashamu marble deposit extends up to 25 km sq. The then Governor of Oyo State, Chief Bola Ige, commissioned the site where a reported over 2000 people were employed by Ashamu. Ashamu’s investment opened up the Igbeti axis of the state and his name has been synonymous with the marble deposit ever since. Following a legal dispute with the state government, Ashamu’s interest in the business was divested in 1980 causing him to leave the business, resulting in its practical collapse.

== Agriculture ==
Ashamu established Oke Afa farms in 1970 which was the largest poultry in the Nigeria and also Oyo Feeds and Premier Farms; at the height of the business, it employed up to 1,000 people. Premier Farms specialised in Maize plantation at its Okaka Farm, Ikoyi, Igbo-Ora, Oyo state, with much of the produce sold to Oyo Feeds which turned it to Animal feed and sold much of it to Oke Afa farms. Oke Afa then sold commercial meat and chicken to eateries and the military. A 1961 US Dept. of State document on Agricultural Investments in Nigeria noted Ashamu Holdings as “one of the largest commercial groups in Nigeria to have begun extensive large scale farming with a commitment to developing such farms”. However, by the late 1970s, agro-business ventures in Nigeria were hampered by import restrictions that curtailed the availability of feed ingredients.

== Controversy ==
It is widely reported in Oyo history that Ashamu was the benefactor and backer of Lamidi Adeyemi on his ascension to the throne of Alaafin, becoming the 44th Alaafin of Oyo, Oba Lamidi Olayiwola Adeyemi Alowolodu III, on January 14, 1971.

Although Adeyemi’s ascension was faced with stiff competition, Chief Ashamu rallied the supporters and associates of Adeyemi’s father to ensure the 32-year old Adeyemi emerged victorious. It is reported that the prosperous businessman (Ashamu), once said a priest had told him not to allow the young Lamidi to carry his purse again because he was going to be a king. The priest reportedly told Chief Ashamu that he must deploy his resources to help the young Lamidi against other contenders whenever it was time. That happened. Adeyemi’s coronation as Alaafin was a grand ceremony as never seen before.

== Later years ==
Chief Ashamu was the patriarch of a large extended family and known as a revered leader in his community. Chief Ashamu died on 20 August 1992. At his time of death he had an estimated net worth of $250 million US Dollars. He was survived by many children and grandchildren.
