= Jorge Abraham Hazoury =

Dominican endocrinologist

Jorge Abraham Hazoury Bahlés
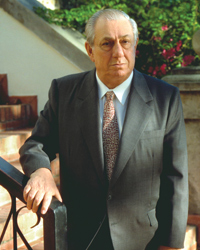
- Born: 20 August 1924; Barahona, Dominican Republic
- Died: 18 September 2004; Santo Domingo, Dominican Republic
- Spouse: Mercedes Toral
- Children: Maricarmen Hazoury; Abraham Hazoury; Ricardo Hazoury; Fernando Hazoury
- Scientific career
- Fields: Endocrinology, Diabetology

Jorge Abraham Hazoury Bahlés (Barahona, 20 August 1924 – Santo Domingo, 18 September 2004) was a Dominican endocrinologist, diabetologist and humanist. He was the founder of the Ibero-American University (UNIBE).

== Early life ==
Jorge Abraham Hazoury Bahlés was born to Lebanese parents in Barahona on 20 August 1924, wherein he had elementary and secondary studies. He graduated from Medicine in 1950 at the Autonomous University of Santo Domingo.

He married Mercedes Toral and had 4 children, among them, the businessman Ricardo Hazoury, the founder of Cap Cana.

== Fight against diabetes ==
With a vision of the future and aware of the need to protect Diabetics, Hazoury founded on 9 November 1966 the Dominican Diabetes Society (SODODIA) and the Diabetes Control Board in 1972. As a dependency of the Board of Trustees, in 1979 he created the National Institute of Diabetes, Endocrinology and Nutrition (INDEN), to offer medical services to the most needy classes in the country. Through various efforts, the writing of scientific articles and the benefit of marathons performed inside and outside the country, managed to inaugurate in 1983 the School for Diabetics Hospital where it offers all the specialties of Medicine to the Dominican diabetics. In 2004 this school was given the name of Dr. Hazoury Bahlés in recognition of his years of struggle against diabetes.

== Universidad Iberoamericana ==
Hazoury founded Universidad Iberoamericana (UNIBE) on 12 July 1982, as a result of the initiative expressed by the Ibero-American Cooperation Institute and a steering committee in the Dominican Republic. Hazoury was its first Rector until 1991, with an enrollment that surpasses at present the 5,000 students and 20,640 graduates.

Similarly, he began the Residency in Diabetology and Nutrition in 1988 and the Residence of Ophthalmology in 1991. Both with operations in the INDEN and from which have come notable Dominican and foreign specialists.

== Reconocimientos Nacionales e Internacionales ==
- 1975: Miembro de Honor de la Asociación Venezolana de Diabetes.
- 1977: Honor al Mérito de la Federación Latinoamericana de Asociaciones Lucha contra la Diabetes (Coro, Venezuela).
- 1978: Reconocimiento de la Asociación Laica de Diabetes de Puerto Rico, (Capítulo de Ponce, Puerto Rico).
- 1984: Hijo Distinguido de Barahona por el Ayuntamiento Municipal de la Ciudad.
- 1984: Diploma de Honor de la Asociación Médica de la Ciudad de Barahona.
- 1984: Diploma de la Cámara Dominico Americana de Comercio de (Miami, Florida).
- 1986: Orden al Mérito de Duarte, Sánchez y Mella del Gobierno Dominicano.
- 1987: Miembro Honorífico de la Asociación Latinoamericana de Diabetes.
- 1987: La Asociación Laica de Diabetes de Puerto Rico lo designa Asesor Médico.
- 1987: La Real Academia de Medicina de Salamanca le concede Título Académico. (España)
- 1992: Reconocido internacionalmente con la Medalla Hagedorm de la Casa NOVO Nordisk de Dinamarca.
- 1992: Mención de Honor de La Fundación Jiménez Díaz, (Madrid, España).
- 1992: La Comunidad Científica Loyola lo galardona en el Área de la Ciencia, por haber recibido la Medalla Hagedorm.
- 1996: Reconocimiento del Consejo del Desarrollo Socio-Económico de la ciudad de Barahona por su diligente gestión en la creación del Instituto Nacional de Diabetes, Endocrinología y Nutrición, (INDEN).
- 1996: La Asociación Médica Dominicana (AMD), hoy Colegio Médico Dominicano (CMD), lo acredita como Maestro de la Medicina Dominicana.
- 2001: La Fundación Dominicana de Endocrinología le otorga en Reconocimiento a sus Méritos y Esfuerzos realizados a favor de los diabéticos dominicanos.
- 2013: Reconocimiento póstumo de la Cámara de Diputados del Congreso de la República Dominicana como el pionero en la lucha contra la Diabetes.
