= Union des Femmes Monégasques =

Union des Femmes Monégasques (UFM) is a women's organization founded in 1958 in Monaco.

== History ==
The women's movement developed late in Monaco. Women's suffrage had been suggested by a male politician in 1919, at a time when married women were still legal minors, but there had been no organized women's movement in Monaco until the creation of the UFM.

UFM was founded in 1958 to support the introduction of women's suffrage in Monaco. It was the first women's organization in Monaco.

Women's suffrage and basic rights was included in the reform package introduced in Monaco in 1962.
