= Chilean nationalism =

Chilean nationalism is the nationalism of Chilean people and Chilean culture. It originated as a strain of political thought between 1904 and 1914 with the rise of the centenary essayists, the birth of the Nationalist Party and the reaappreciation of the authoritarian political discourse of the statesman Diego Portales (1793–1837).

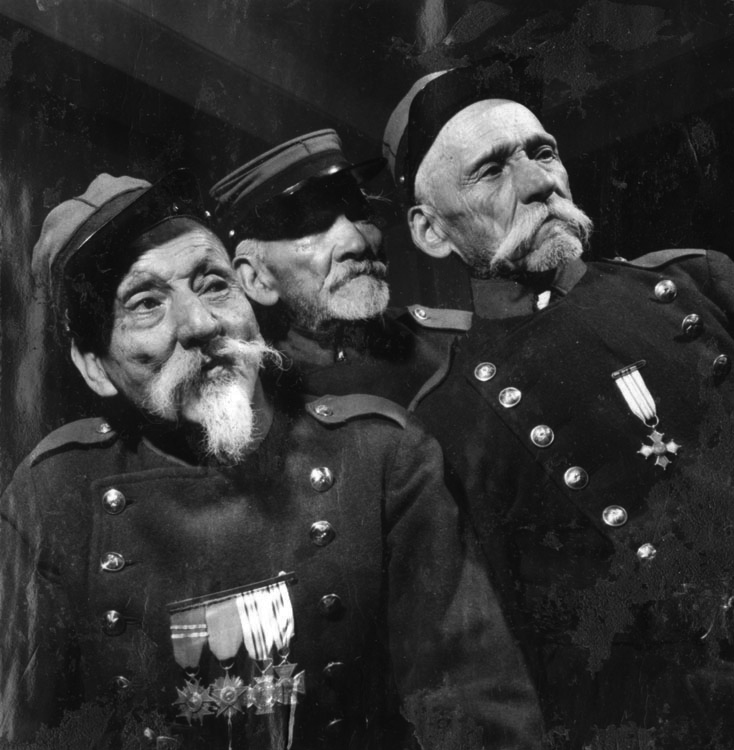
Veterans of the War of the Pacific in 1943. For the sociologist Hernán Larraín, This episode strengthens the idea of a Chilean racial identity based on warlike qualities.

== Intellectual trajectory and main ideas ==
Chilean nationalist ideas arose in the context of the political and economic crisis at the start of the 20th century, when a group of intellectuals tried to find a way out of the crisis by appealing to industrial development, authoritarian policies, ethnonational identity, economic protection and strong opposition to political and economic liberalism.

According to some authors, the first formal theorist of Chilean nationalism was the doctor and veteran Nicolás Palacios, who published his famous book Raza chilena in 1904, in which he proposed the racial superiority of Chileans due to their mix of "warrior Visigoths" and "strong Araucanians." Palacios was, according to historian Erwin Robertson, a self-proclaimed racist as well as a spectator of the social inequalities of the time, “a preferential witness of the Santa María School Massacre in Iquique” and “the defender of the Roto against an oligarchy that he considered the result of negative social selection”. This book contains three principal ideas: that Chilean miscegenation had given rise to a permanent and defined race, composed of both the Mapuche, an American Indian particularly suited to war and the hostility of the climate; as well as by Spanish conquistadors of Germanic descent, whose warrior skills were also highlighted by the author, that Chilean territory, contrary to the reports that were provided, was mostly unusable given its amount of sterile land, so immigration policies had to be even more selective and prevent the entry of "Latin races", in order to favor the entry of Germans and other "Nordic" ethnicities, and that much of the crisis they faced was related to the poor image that the people had of themselves, an issue accentuated by the "dominant oligarchy", which "mercilessly despised" the lower class.

The racial theories of Palacios influenced the prolific historian and philosopher Francisco Antonio Encina, (National Literature Prize, 1951), one of the founding members of the Nationalist Party in 1910. Nationalist sentiment was quite popular until the 1960s, the main ideas expressed in his extensive twenty-volume Historia de Chile desde la Prehistoria hasta 1891 (English: History of Chile from Prehistory to 1891), and in the essays Nuestra inferioridad económica (English: Our inferior economy) and La educación económica y el liceo,(English: Financial education and high school) both published in 1912; many of his racial ideas can be found in La literatura histórica chilena y el concepto actual de la historia (English: Chilean literary history and the current concept of history), published in 1935 and republished in 1997 by Editorial Universitaria. Similarly to Palacios, Encina thought that the Chilean aristocracy had lost its chivalrous spirit for a banal and uncompromising one. For the historian, the decadency of the Chilean elite originated with the triumph of the liberals in the Civil War of 1891 and the implementation of anti-state policies of liberal economist Jean Gustave Courcelle-Seneuil, which consisted of lowering tariffs and allowing the entry of foreign products and companies, resulting in a “decline of the national entrepreneurial spirit and the surrender of the country to large foreign companies”. It promoted policy oriented towards industrial education, since it considered the Chilean "race" incompatible with "humanistic education" (liberal arts) that the elites engaged in. However, the most remarked upon aspect of Encina's writings is their racist content: unlike Palacios, Encina saw racial mixing as a negative as it decreased Spanish blood. He lamented that miscegenation destroyed the prosperity that other European colonies achieved in North America, while Palacios was favorable towards ethnic mixing. Therefore, for Encina, the stratification of creole society and the political power of the aristocracy had a racial explanation: "Chilean society was left with a social makeup, that, in general, coincides with the ethnic makeup: on top, the Chileans with the most Spanish blood, and on the bottom, those with the most Indigenous blood."

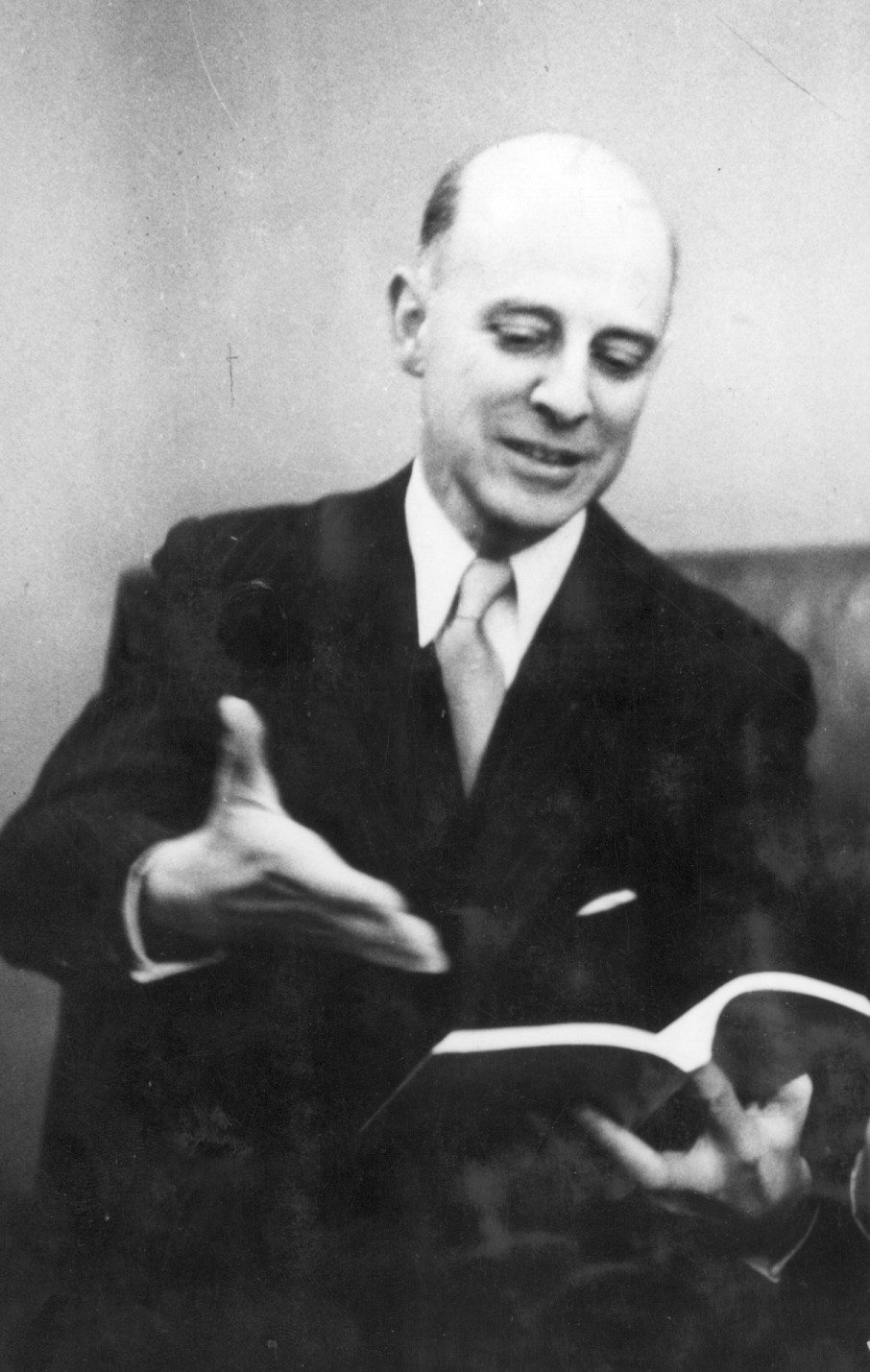
Jaime Eyzaguirre, main author of the Hispanic movement within Chilean nationalism.

Later, the lawyer and academic Alberto Edwards published La fronda aristocrática en Chile (English: The aristocratic frond in Chile), a book that criticized the gentrification of the Chilean aristocracy due to its lack of connection with reality, its lack of ability to react to crisis and its economic attitude. Edwards criticized liberalism in the book, accusing it of uprooting the nation of its traditions and its founding values. This work was strongly influenced by The Decline of the West by German philosopher Oswald Spengler, who he cited and studied; the investigators Renato Cristi and Carlos Ruize define Edwards as a "conservative-revolutionary" thinker. For his part, fellow academic Carlos Keller, student of Spengler and member of the National Socialist Movement of Chile, published La eterna crisis chilena (English: The eternal Chilean crisis), a book of political economy and sociological analysis that showed what Mario Góngora called “the nationalist response to the crisis”.

Between 1940 and 1960, Chilean nationalism incorporated falangist and corporatist concepts. Inspired by the Franco regime, there was a Hispanist shift. Traditionalist professor Jaime Eyzaguirre published the magazine Estudios (1938–1954), of a corporativist, nationalist, and Catholic ideology, with collaborators Mario Góngora and right-wing professor Julio Philippi Izquierdo. The theologician and philosopher Osvaldo Lira published his most important works during this period: Nostalgia de Vázquez de Mella (English: Nostalgia of Vasquez de Mella) (1942), La vida en torno (1948), and Hispanidad y mestizaje, y otros ensayos (1952) (English: Hispanic and Mestizo, and other essays). The nationalist lawyer Jorge Prat founded the magazine Estanquero in 1948, from a strong hispanist and corporatist point of view.

The government of Salvador Allende and the victory of Marxism through democratic means generated a proposal of an "armed revolt" against the democratic government. The warlike literature of these years was gathered mostly in four publications: The magazine Patria y Libertad (1971-1973; organized by Fatherland and Liberty), organized by University of Chile academic Pablo Rodríguez Grez; the magazine Tacna (1970–1974) organized by academic from Pontifical Catholic University of Chile (PUC) Sergio Miranda Carrington and law student Erwin Robertson; Tizona, created by philosophy professor Juan Antonio Widow; and Forja (1969-1979; organized by Movimiento Revolucionario Nacional Sindicalista), property of calculus professor Misael Galleguillos, and in which nationalists like Osvaldo Lira and Guillermo Izquierdo Araya participated. With Augusto Pinochet in power, the main nationalist intellectual production was the Avanzada magazine (which later became a political party of the same name), the Center for National Studies directed by Lucía Pinochet (daughter of the dictator) and the publication of the historical essay on the notion of the State in Chile in the 19th and 20th centuries, a fierce criticism of the turn towards neoliberalism that the military junta had taken in Chile, reaffirming Chilean nationality in the strength of the State. This book was written by Mario Góngora, who died three years after its publication after being run over by a motorcycle in an incident outside the San Joaquín Campus of the PUC . From the 1990s onwards, Chilean nationalism had no high-profile intellectuals and they did not participate in the public debate.

Since the 2010s, academics Daniel Chernilo, Axel Kaiser, Benjamin Ugalde and Felipe Schwember name the existential philosopher Hugo Eduardo Herrera (b. 1974) as the main figure of Chilean nationalism. Herrera prefers to refer to himself as part of the "national-popular tradition", that, according to him, "had its beginning in the brief experiment of the Nationalist Party in 1915, afterwards in the Agrarian-Labor party, the National Party, and currently the RN." Researchers Renato Cristi and Carlos Ruize describe him as "one of the most lucid right-wing intellectuals in the present day", but criticize the extreme authoritarianism of authors like Francisco Antonio Encina and Alberto Edwards, whom Herrero uses as intellectual references. Sociology professor Daniel Chernilo has accused him of fascism.

== Political trajectory ==
=== Nationalist Party (1915-1920) ===
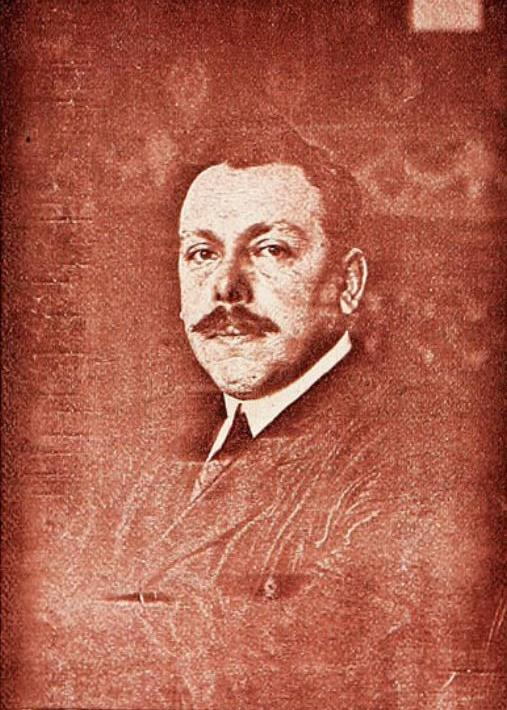
Luis Galdames Galdames, nationalist intellectual and constituent in 1925. He participated in the centenary crisis and was one of the most renowned professors in the pedagogy.

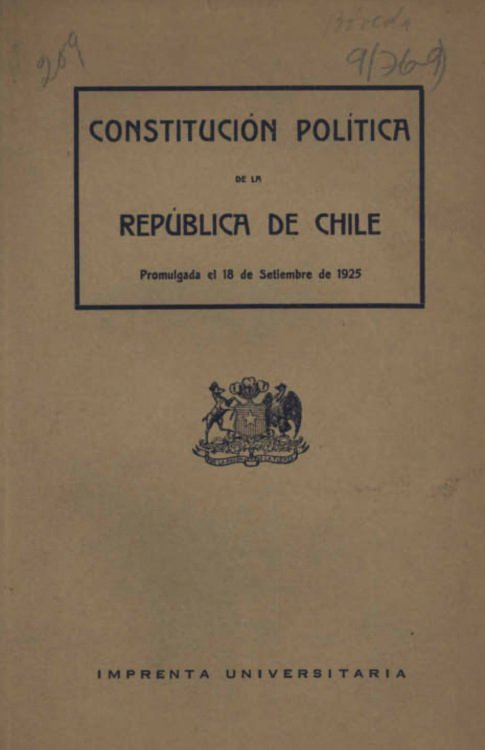
Guillermo Subercaseaux and Luis Galdames participated in the writing of the Constitution of Chile (1925).

The name of the party and its date of creation are not clear. In certain sources, it is called the Nationalist Union, created in 1913, that corresponded to the Nationalist Party, which was the most well-known name. Other sources cite 1914 or 1915 as the year of creation.

Its main members were Alberto Edwards Vives, Francisco Antonio Encina, Luis Galdames, Tancredo Pinochet, and Guillermo Subercaseaux. Subercaseaux wrote the pamphlet Los ideales nacionalistas ante el doctrinarismo de nuestros partidos políticos históricos (1918) that summarized the main ideas of the party. Many of them had previously outlined criticisms and plans of action, like Encina.

The pragmatic proposal was the implementation of a strong State inspired by the portalian State, in which the government promoted a greater state invention in economic and national activity, that is to say, an abandonment of laissez-faire economic policy, protection of national industry, nationalization of the state and the church, social reforms to improve the conditions of the lower and middle classes, and change in education towards technical skills and nationalist values.

Although the party was not a success in terms of policy change or electoral impact, save for the election of Subercaseaux as a representative in 1915–1918, it marked the beginning of the nationalist movement of Chile. Their ideas had influence on the revolutionary movements of 1924 and 1925, and during the government of Ibáñez (1927 - 1931).

=== Influence on and reception by Fascism (1932-1945) ===
During the years 1930 to 1940 the age of fascism in Europe was felt in some Chilean nationalist movements.

==== National Socialist Movement of Chile (1932-1938) ====
The National Socialist Movement of Chile (MNS or MNSCh), also called the Nacista Party, was a political party in Chile with National Socialist and fascist influence that existed from 1932 to 1939. It was founded on 5 April 1932 by the lawyer Jorge González von Marées (its spokesman), the sociologist and economist Carlos Keller (its principal ideologue), and the retired officer Francisco Javier Díaz Valderrama.

In the 1937 parliamentary elections it won three deputies. In 1938 the MNS, together with other groups, formed the Alianza Popular Libertadora (APL) and supported the candidacy of Carlos Ibáñez del Campo. In early 1939 the MNS was reorganized and shifted leftward, adopting the name Vanguardia Popular Socialista (VPS).

Note on dates: some summary formats use 1938 to mark the post–Seguro Obrero collapse of the movement’s effective political role, while other accounts describe a formal reorganization and name change in early 1939.

==== Seguro Obrero Massacre ====
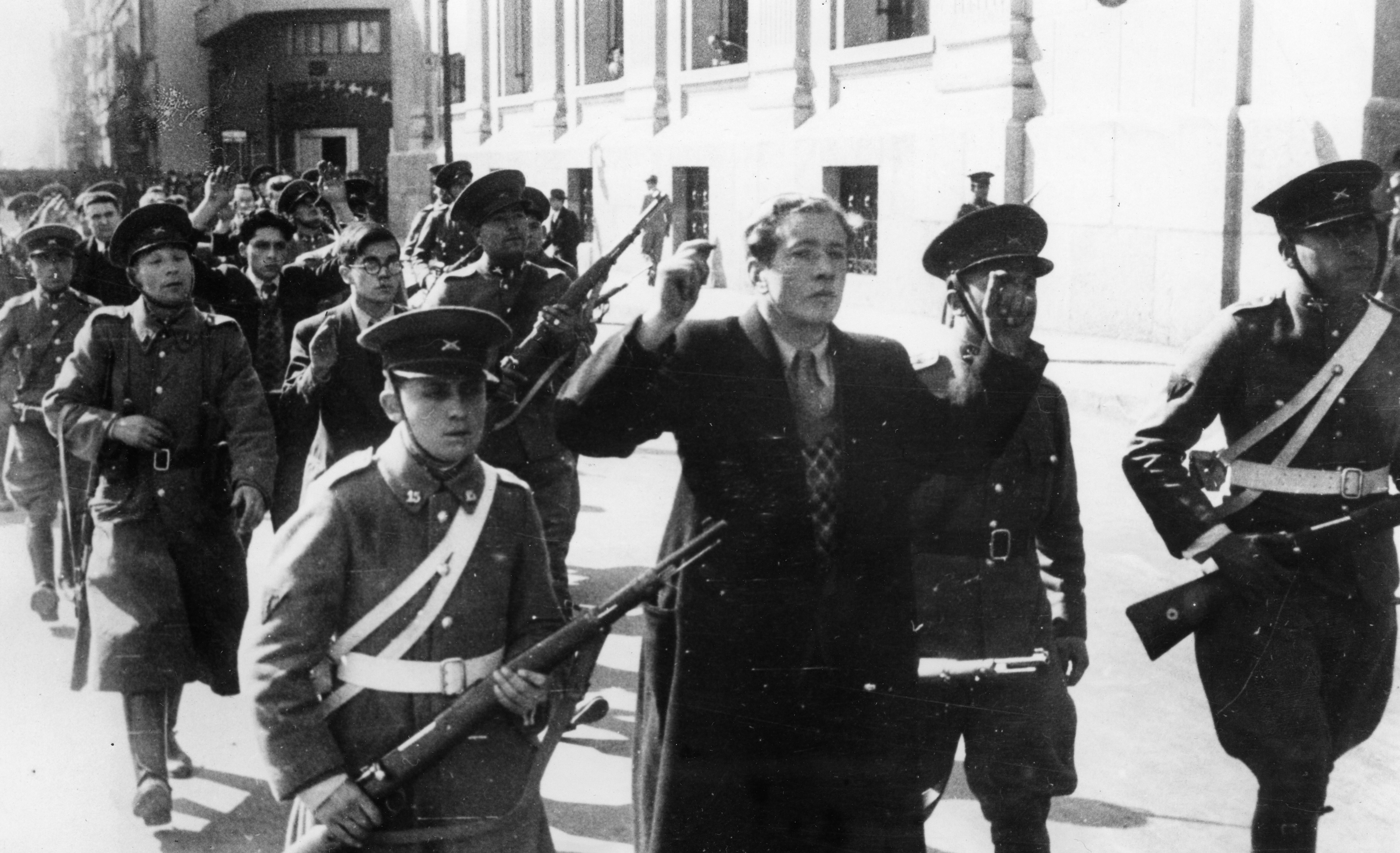
Chilean Carabineros quells the Nacista insurrection during the Seguro Obrero Massacre.

The Seguro Obrero massacre (Spanish: Matanza del Seguro Obrero, lit. 'Workers Insurance's Massacre') occurred on 5 September 1938, and was the Chilean government's response to an attempted coup d'état by the National Socialist Movement of Chile (MNSCh), whose members were known at the time as Nacistas ("Nazis"). The Nacistas occupied the central building at the University of Chile and the Seguro Obrero building. Because the Nacistas were known for their affinity towards violence in order to attain their goals, the Chilean government and the carabineros (Chilean Gendarmerie) responded quickly and harshly.

The failed coup and massacre took place in the midst of a heated three-way election campaign between the liberal-conservative Gustavo Ross Santa María, the radical Popular Front's Pedro Aguirre Cerda, and the newly formed Popular Alliance candidate, Carlos Ibáñez del Campo. Elections were set to take place 25 October, just over a month after the massacre took place. The National Socialist Movement of Chile supported Ibáñez's candidacy, which had been announced on 4 September. The coup d'état was intended to take down the liberal government of Arturo Alessandri Palma and place Ibañez in power.

After the failed coup, which involved a stand-off and shootout where one Nacista and one police officer were killed, the Nacistas surrendered after receiving assurances of not being harmed. However, the police then broke their promise and summarily executed the Nacistas, allegedly under the orders of President Arturo Alessandri. A total of 59 Nacistas were massacred, with only four of the rebels managing to escape. Two Seguro Obrero employees were killed as well in the confusion.

==== Later fascist groups (1938-1945) ====
After the massacre, the leadership of the National Socialist Party (commanded by Jorge González von Mareés) turned sharply to the left, approaching the Popular Front of Pedro Aguirre Cerda. This meant that in 1938, the ex-Nacist Raúl Olivares founded the National-Fascist Party, which maintained the anti-Semitic and fascist line of the previous one. Olivares' group would merge with the project of university professor Guillermo Izquierdo Araya, creating the Nationalist Movement of Chile, which in turn became the Nationalist Union Party of Chile, this time led by academic Juan Gómez Millas. All of these groups, with an open fascist tendency, disappeared in 1945, when the end of the Second World War left them without political references.

=== Agrarian-Labor Party ===
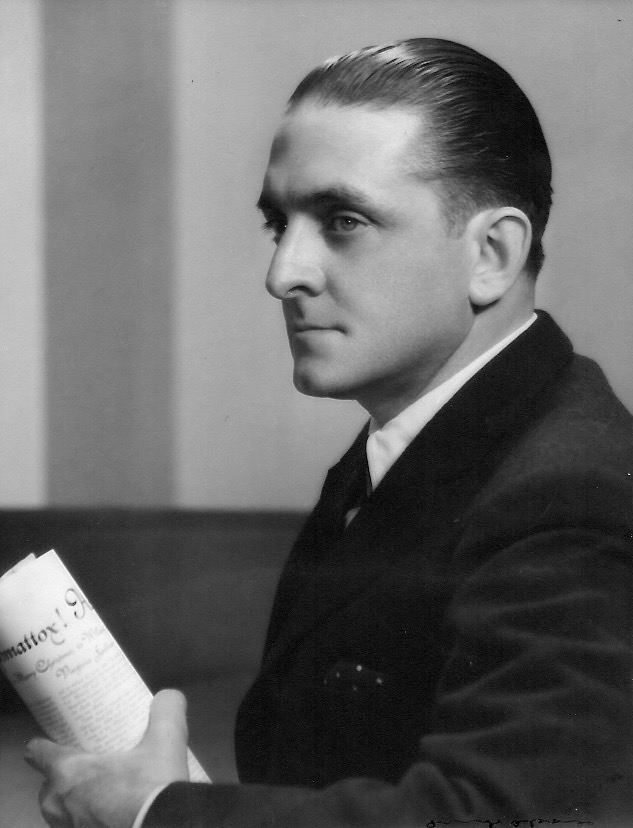
Jaime Larraín García-Moreno, first president of the PAL.

The Agrarian-Labor Party (PAL) was a right-wing Chilean political party, of nationalist and corporatist ideology founded on September 7, 1945. It emerged from the merger of the Agrarian Party with the Libertarian Popular Alliance (APL). It also had the presence of elements of the Nationalist Movement of Chile (MNCh). In 1948 it formed the so-called Falange Radical Agrarian Socialist Radical Party(FRAS). In the parliamentary elections of 1949 it won fourteen deputies and four senators. In 1952 it supported the presidential candidacy of Carlos Ibáñez del Campo, and when he was elected, he invited them to participate in his government together with the socialists. In 1952 it supported the presidential candidacy of Carlos Ibáñez del Campo, and when he was elected, he invited them to participate in his government together with the socialists.

In 1954, a dissident faction of the party formed the Agrarian Labor Recuperationist Party (PAL-R). In 1958, it split again due to the fact that one sector of the party supported Democratic Christian Eduardo Frei Montalva and the other supported independent Jorge Alessandri Rodriguez.

Finally, in October 1958 the PAL merged with the National Party (1956), forming the National Popular Party. Close to the parliamentary elections of 1961, the PAL divided again, and one group joined the Christian Democratic Party (PDC) and another group of militants merged with the Democratic Party, giving rise to the National Democratic Party (Padena).In 1963 some militants made an effort to unify the PAL, but in the 1965 parliamentary elections the party did not obtain optimal results and ceased to exist according to the electoral laws in force.

=== Pratismo (1960s) ===
==== National Action ====
The National Action Party, or simply National Action (Spanish: Acción Nacional), was a Chilean right-wing political party of nationalist ideology.

National Action was founded by Jorge Prat Echaurren, Sergio Onofre Jarpa and Tobías Barros on November 15, 1963; their board of directors consisting of Sergio Onofre Jarpa as president and Renato Marino as secretary. The party sought to raise Prat bid for the presidential election of 1964, but this was deposed in April 1964.

Some of the members of National Action were Mario Arnello Romo, Sergio Miranda Carrington, and Hugo Gálvez. The group also included former supporters of defunct President Carlos Ibáñez del Campo (Ibañistas) and former members of the National Syndicalist Revolutionary Movement (Movimiento Revolucionario Nacional Sindicalista, MRNS), that doesn't had legal existence, and therefore had difficulties to compete in elections.

The party presented a list in parliamentary elections in 1965. The list of senators in Santiago got 54,536 votes, which were not enough to choose any senator. Lists of deputies, however, gained only 15,173 votes distributed in the provinces of Tarapacá, Valparaiso, Santiago and Talca, not choosing any parliamentarian. In May 1966 it merged with the Liberal Party and the United Conservative Party to form the National Party.

=== Popular Unity ===
==== Fatherland and Liberty ====
The Nationalist Fatherland and Liberty Front (FNPL), also known only as Patria y Libertad (PyL), was a Chilean paramilitary organization of extreme right-wing, fascist and ultra-nationalist ideology formed on April 1, 1971, to oppose through political violence, sabotage and terrorism the socialist government of Salvador Allende and the Popular Unity.

Its origin dates back to September 10, 1970, when Pablo Rodríguez Grez formed the "Homeland and Freedom Civic Movement" to prevent the election of Salvador Allende in Congress, which originated the movement that opposed Allende's government until its dissolution. in 1973 after the coup d'état.

In June 1973, the group attempted a coup against the Allende government but failed, in an event known as the Tanquetazo. In July 1973, it received orders from the Chilean Navy, which opposed the Schneider Doctrine of military adherence to the Constitution, to sabotage Chile's infrastructure. Collaboration between the FNPL and the Chilean Armed Forces increased after the failed strike of October 1972, which sought to overthrow the Allende administration. According to sectors opposed to Allende in the army, the group murdered Allende's naval aide, Arturo Araya Peeters, on July 26, 1973. The first sabotage was committed that same day. Others include creating a power outage while Allende was being broadcast edon television.

==== National Party ====
In the parliamentary elections of 1965, the Liberal Party and the Conservative Party were in a deep electoral crisis, obtaining 6 and 3 deputies respectively compared to the 82 of the Christian Democrats, the 20 of the Radical Party and the 18 of the Communist Party. Results that left the right practically without participation. In this context, the nationalist politicians Jorge Prat, Mario Arnello and Sergio Onofre Jarpa, who came from National Action, drafted the Declaration of Principles of a new "National Party", uniting the right in a nationalist project that adopted the anti-communism of right-wing parties in decline.

=== Chilean nationalism in the present day ===
After the dissolution of National Advance, there were no nationalist projects that bore fruit in the political field, its members joined Union of the Centrist Center, which was a party that brought together the nationalists of National Renewal and other movements of that type. The skinhead movement revived small groups such as the National Order Front, New Fatherland Society and the National Socialist Movement of Chilean Workers (all dissolved), who tended more towards the Nazism of the 1930s.

The researcher Julio Cortés Morales has pointed out that currently the only properly nationalist group is the neo-fascist collective Social Patriot Movement (2017-). This group is focused on the publication of authors such as Alain de Benoist, Alberto Buela or Diego Fusaro, and on the dissemination of ultra-nationalist, ultra-conservative and national-populist ideas. Part of their membership went to the Party of the People, where they are part of the nationalist faction led by the current deputy Gaspar Rivas, who was president of the Social Patriotic Movement until the 2019-2022 protests. Rivas ends up being expelled from the People's Party after promoting the election of Karol Cariola - whom the "social-patriots" had harassed years before - as president of the Chamber of Deputies of Chile, and his current relationship with nationalism is not clear.

== Nationalist writers ==
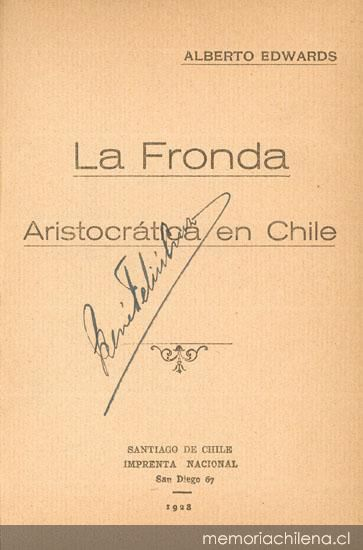
La fronda aristocrática en Chile (1927).

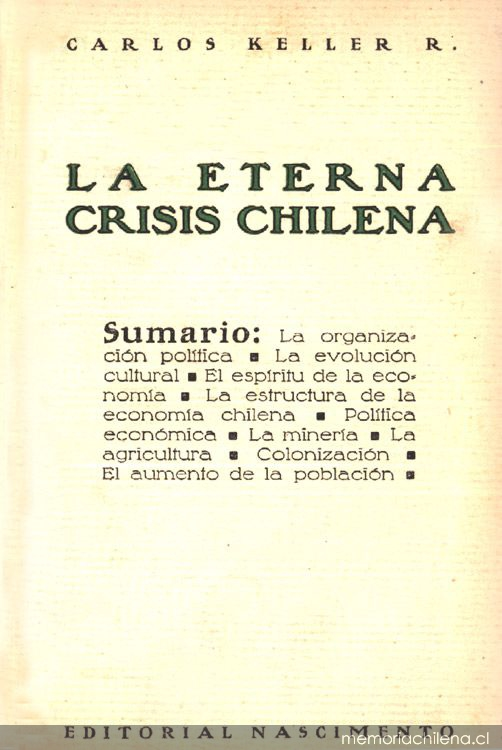
La eterna crisis chilena (1931).

=== Centenary generation (1910s to 1930s) ===
- Nicolás Palacios, essayist.
- Francisco Antonio Encina, historian.
- Carlos Keller, economist, philosopher y sociologist.
- Alberto Edwards, historian.
- Luis Galdames Galdames, historian.
- Tancredo Pinochet, journalist.
- Alejandro Venegas, journalist.

=== National-Fascist generation (1930-1945) ===
- Guillermo Izquierdo Araya, lawyer.
- Miguel Serrano Fernández, novelist/diplomat.
- Joaquín Edwards Bello, chronicler.
- Tito Mundt, chronicler.

=== Hispanist generation (1940s and 50s) ===
- Gonzalo Vial, historian.
- Osvaldo Lira, philosopher and theologian.
- Jaime Eyzaguirre, historian.
- Jorge Prat, journalist.

=== Nationalism "at the hunt of the Armed Forces" (1969-1974) ===
- Sergio Miranda Carrington, lawyer.
- Erwin Robertson, historian.
- Juan Antonio Widow, philosopher.
- Pablo Rodríguez Grez, lawyer.

=== Nationalists during the military dictatorship of Pinochet (1973-1990) ===
For Pinochet	Against Pinochet
Mario Arnello, lawyer; Carlos Cruz-Coke, lawyer.; Arturo Fontaine Aldunate, lawyer.; Héctor Herrera Cajas, historian.; Patricia Arancibia Clavel, historian.; Gisela Silva Encina, historian.; Juan Antonio Widow; Pablo Rodríguez Grez; Sergio Miranda Carrington; Osvaldo Lira	Miguel Serrano Fernández, philosopher and novelist.; Mario Góngora, historian.; Pedro Godoy Perrín, educator.; Erwin Robertson; Gonzalo Vial

=== National-popular (2000-present) ===
- Hugo Eduardo Herrera, philosopher.
- Carlos Videla, essayist.
- José Ignacio Vásquez, lawyer.

== See also ==
- Diego Portales
- Francoist influence in Chile
- Seguro Obrero massacre
- Tacnazo insurrection
- Tanquetazo
- Pinochetismo
- Nazism in Chile
- Racism in Chile
