= Oscar Espinosa Moraga =

Chilean historian, researcher, genealogist, civil servant, and nationalist

- Born: Oscar Hernán Espinosa Moraga; 2 January 1928; Talcahuano, Chile
- Died: 20 November 2010 (aged 82); Santiago, Chile
- Resting place: General Cemetery of Santiago
- Education: Liceo San Agustín; University of Chile (unfinished)
- Occupations: Historian, researcher, genealogist, civil servant
- Employer(s): National Health Service of Chile (1950–1977); Chilean Navy (1977–1981)
- Organizations: Chilean Institute for Historical Commemoration
- Movement: Chilean nationalism, Realism (international relations)
- Spouse: Julia Costa Canales

Oscar Hernán Espinosa Moraga (Note: In this Chilean name, the first or paternal surname is Espinosa and the second or maternal family name is Moraga.) (2 January 1928 – 20 November 2010) was a Chilean historian, researcher, genealogist and civil servant, specialized in border history and Chilean diplomacy. His work was characterized by a critical, revisionist and deeply nationalist view of Chile's diplomatic history. He also served as an advisor to the Chilean Navy General Staff and to the National Health Service.

== Biography ==
Oscar Espinosa was born in Talcahuano on 2 January 1928, son of Julio Espinosa Allende and Clara Hortensia Moraga Montero. On his maternal side, he descended from general Nicolás Salvo, who served as Governor of Chiloé in the 18th century.

He studied at the Liceo San Agustín in Santiago from 1936 to 1947, showing an early interest in Chilean history and a deep admiration for Francisco Antonio Encina. He then enrolled in the Law School of the University of Chile, but did not complete his degree. One of his professors, Guillermo Feliú Cruz, described him as a frail, intelligent and passionate young man.

In 1950 he joined the National Health Service, where he worked for nearly thirty years. He married Julia Costa Canales, to whom he dedicated part of his work. In parallel with his public service, he developed a prolific career as an independent researcher and writer.

== Historical work ==
Oscar Espinosa Moraga's work focused on the Borders of Chile and its diplomatic history.

His first significant research was the rediscovery of the 1859 document “Memoria sobre el límite septentrional de Chile”. This marked his lifelong dedication to border, sovereignty and diplomatic topics. In 1950, he published Arturo Prat, agente confidencial de Chile en Montevideo, about the secret mission of Arturo Prat in the Río de la Plata region.

Among his most notable works are: La cuestión de límites chileno-argentina, Los Pactos de Mayo, La Postguerra del Pacífico y la Puna de Atacama (1884–1899), and El aislamiento de Chile, in which he criticizes regional integration from a nationalist perspective. Other titles include Bolivia y el mar (1810–1864) and La cuestión del río Lauca.

His most ambitious and controversial work was El precio de la paz chileno-argentina, a three-volume study that exhaustively inventories all border negotiations between Chile and Argentina since independence and questions the sincerity of mutual friendship. Beyond documenting sources, Espinosa delivers a harsh historical judgment: he denounces what he saw as a systematically submissive Chilean diplomacy that—according to him—never prevailed and repeatedly ceded territory due to political cowardice, misguided Americanism, and national indifference.

In 1974, he published Presencia de Brasil (1500–1973), where he anticipates Brazil's dominant role in South America. Years later, shortly before the Falklands War, he authored La cuestión de las Islas Falkland (1492–1982), offering a critical view of Argentina’s claims over the archipelago. The book won first place in the 1982 Literary Contest of the Chilean Army General Staff.

He also published Nuestra verdad sobre el Cono Sur, a brief essay on Southern Cone geopolitics from a Chilean nationalist perspective, including a chapter by Guillermo Izquierdo Araya.

Additional works include El sentimiento nacionalista de Salvador Reyes in homage to Salvador Reyes Figueroa, and Latorre y la vocación marítima de Chile, dedicated to admiral Juan José Latorre.

== Public service and diplomatic archives ==
Between 1955 and 1960, Espinosa worked to organize the chaotic archives of the Ministry of Foreign Affairs, which gave him access to valuable documentation for his historical research. According to his own accounts, he discovered serious errors made by Chilean diplomacy, some of which he publicly exposed in his books.

From 1977 to 1981, he served as an advisor to the General Staff of the Chilean Navy on international affairs, and also contributed to the Revista Marina.

He was a vocal critic of Pope John Paul II’s mediation in the Beagle conflict between Argentina and Chile in 1978.

== Style and thought ==
Espinosa Moraga was a controversial historian, disconnected from the academic establishment, with a sharply critical view of Chilean diplomatic submission. He embraced a revisionist and nationalist approach to history. His detractors labeled him a conservative or even "fascist", while his defenders valued his persistent critique of concealment and mediocrity in national diplomacy.

He often said that Chilean intellectuals "have the vernacular habit of speaking about topics they do not understand", and blamed the political elites for surrendering vast territories due to ignorance, laziness, or cowardice. He strongly criticized intellectuals such as Diego Barros Arana, Benjamín Vicuña Mackenna, José Victorino Lastarria, and even Bernardo O’Higgins, whom he accused of political naïveté and subservience to foreign interests.

== Later years and death ==
After the death of his wife, Espinosa withdrew from public life and lived in his apartment on San Diego Street, in Santiago. There he continued writing and publishing until his full retirement. His last book, Los Moraga: de Cáceres a Paredones, was released in 1992.

He died on 20 November 2010, during Chile's Bicentennial year, without receiving any official recognition or public tribute. He was buried at the General Cemetery of Santiago, alongside his parents.

His works have been cited by the Corporation for the Defense of Sovereignty to analyze sensitive territorial issues, such as the Copahue volcano conflict and the 1902 arbitration ruling, reinforcing his legacy as a critical chronicler of Chilean diplomacy.

== Selected works ==
- Arturo Prat, agente confidencial de Chile en Montevideo (1950)
- La cuestión de límites chileno-argentina (1951)
- Los Pactos de Mayo (1952)
- La Postguerra del Pacífico y la Puna de Atacama (1958)
- El aislamiento de Chile (1961)
- Bolivia y el mar (1810–1864) (1965)
- La cuestión del río Lauca (1965)
- El precio de la paz chileno-argentina (1810–1969) (1969)
- El sentimiento nacionalista de Salvador Reyes (1970)
- Presencia de Brasil (1500–1973) (1974)
- Latorre y la vocación marítima de Chile (1979)
- La cuestión de las Islas Falkland (1492–1982) (1983)
- Nuestra verdad sobre el Cono Sur (1983), co-authored with Guillermo Izquierdo Araya
- El destino de Chile (1541–1984) (1984)
- Los Andonaegui de Vizcaya, de Chile y de Argentina (1984)
- Catálogo del notarial de Curicó (1661–1903) (1987)
- Los Moraga: de Cáceres a Paredones (1992)
