= Corporation for the Defense of Sovereignty =

Chilean civil organization

Corporación de Defensa de la Soberanía
- Symbolic representation of Chile, including its "lost territories"
- Formation: 1960; 66 years ago
- Type: Corporation
- Legal status: Legal entity
- Purpose: Study and defense of the borders of Chile
- Headquarters: Santiago
- Website: soberaniachile.cl

The Corporation for the Defense of Sovereignty (CDS, Corporación de Defensa de la Soberanía) is a Chilean civil organization founded in 1960 and formally established in 1965 under the name Comité Patria y Soberanía (Homeland and Sovereignty Committee). Its main objective is the study of geopolitics and border issues related to Chile. The group has been actively involved in public debates on these matters, particularly in border conflicts with Argentina. It has been critical of various governmental decisions which, in its view, have resulted in the loss of Chilean territory.

== History ==
The organization emerged in 1960, in the context of the Río Encuentro–Alto Palena border dispute with Argentina, and the ruling of 1966. During the same decade, the death of Lieutenant Hernán Merino Correa of the Carabineros de Chile occurred during the Laguna del Desierto dispute in 1965, after which the organization was formally established. These events were the motivation for its founders to create an entity dedicated to monitoring border affairs and promoting civic activism in defense of Chilean territory.

Since then, the organization has voiced opposition to what it considers a "defeatist" foreign policy, maintaining criticism across different governments, particularly during the administrations of the Concertación coalition. It opposed the 1984 Peace and Friendship Treaty with Argentina, land acquisitions by Douglas Tompkins, the 1994 arbitration over Laguna del Desierto, and the 1998 agreement on the Southern Patagonian Ice Field.

It was officially registered as a corporation by public deed on June 7, 1995, and received legal status in Santiago on April 2, 1996, as published in the Diario Oficial on May 17, 1996.

== Publications ==
The corporation maintained a strong online presence through its website from 2003 to 2010, where it published articles, maps, analyses, and historical documents. It has also served as a source for researchers and has been used in critiques of bilateral treaties deemed unfavorable.

In 2002, then director-general Benjamín González Carrera published the digital book Historia cartográfica resumida de los límites de Chile (Summarized Cartographic History of Chile's Borders) via the organization’s website. Today it is part of the archives of the Ministry of Foreign Affairs of Chile.

== Notable members ==
- Benjamín González Carrera
- Jorge Figueroa Cruz
- Guillermo Izquierdo Araya
- Eduardo García Soto
- Enrique Gallardo Nieto
- Álvaro González Medel
- Roberto Viaux Marambio
- Néstor Bahamonde Palma
- Pedro Espina Ritchie
- Gustavo Leigh Guzmán
- Hugo Zepeda Barrios
- Harold Mesías Placencio
- Francisco Iturriaga Steck
- Exequiel González Madariaga
- Ángel del Gatto Pappadia
- Eduardo Rojas Ávila
- Cristian Salazar Naudón
- Ernesto González Navarrete
- Ramón Arrau Merino
- Aníbal Jara Letelier
- Álvaro Gutiérrez Rodríguez
- Henry Duarte C.
- Pablo Rojas Morales
- Hans Fiebig

== See also ==
- Argentina–Chile relations
- Maximum neighbor hypothesis
- Oscar Espinosa Moraga
- Jaime Eyzaguirre
- René Peri Fagerström
- Francisco Antonio Encina
- Mateo Martinic Beros
