= 1941 Chilean parliamentary election =

Parliamentary elections were held in Chile on 2 March 1941. As the largest parties the Radical Party emerged in the Chamber of Deputies and the Conservative Party in the Senate.

== Electoral system ==
The term length for Senators was eight years, with around half of the Senators elected every four years. This election saw 20 of the 45 Senate seats up for election.

== Results ==
=== Senate ===
Party	Votes	%	Seats
Conservative Party	52,540		5
Radical Party	49,719		6
Liberal Party	37,965		3
Socialist Party	37,857		2
Communist Party	28,449		3
Democratic Party	12,924		0
Laborista Party	5,877		0
Agrarian Party	3,855		1
Democrat Party	2,339		0
National Falange	1,228		0
Popular Freedom Alliance	762		0
Total			20
Total votes	238,485	–	
Registered voters/turnout	575,625	41.43	
Source: Nohlen

=== Chamber of Deputies ===
Party	Votes	%	Seats	+/–
Radical Party	98,296	21.49	44	+15
Conservative Party	77,243	16.88	32	–3
Chilean Socialists' Group	75,500	16.50	15	–4
Communist Party	65,671	14.35	17	+11
Liberal Party	63,118	13.80	22	–13
Democratic Party	19,202	4.20	6	+1
National Falange	15,553	3.40	3	New
Popular Socialist Vanguard	11,175	2.44	2	New
Agrarian Party	7,723	1.69	3	+1
Democrat Party	6,389	1.40	2	–5
Socialist Radical Party	5,076	1.11	1	New
Popular Freedom Alliance	2,268	0.50	0	New
Other parties	9,217	2.01	0	–
Independents	1,058	0.23	0	–3
Total	457,489	100.00	147	+1
Registered voters/turnout	575,625	–		
Source: Nohlen
