= 1945 Chilean parliamentary election =

Parliamentary elections were held in Chile on 4 March 1945. Although the Conservative Party received the most votes, the Radical Party remained the largest party in the Chamber of Deputies and the Senate.

== Electoral system ==
The term length for Senators was eight years, with around half of the Senators elected every four years. This election saw 25 of the 45 Senate seats up for election.

== Results ==
=== Senate ===
Party	Votes	%	Seats
Conservative Party	48,941		5
Radical Party	43,819		7
Liberal Party	35,730		6
Communist Party	25,708		3
Progressive Liberal Party	16,854		1
Socialist Party	12,625		2
Democratic Party	8,105		1
National Falange	7,959		0
Democrat Party	2,120		0
Popular Freedom Alliance	1,531		0
Agrarian Party	688		0
Independents	4,029		0
Total			25
Total votes	216,329	–	
Registered voters/turnout	624,495	34.64	
Source: Nohlen

=== Chamber of Deputies ===
Party	Votes	%	Seats	+/–
Conservative Party	106,264	23.62	36	+4
Radical Party	89,922	19.99	39	–5
Liberal Party	80,579	17.91	31	+9
Communist Party	46,133	10.25	15	–2
Socialist Party	32,314	7.18	6	–9
Authentic Socialist Party	25,104	5.58	3	New
Democratic Party	21,463	4.77	6	0
National Falange	11,565	2.57	3	0
Progressive Liberal Party	9,849	2.19	3	New
Agrarian Party	8,750	1.94	3	0
Democrat Party	2,565	0.57	1	–1
Popular Freedom Alliance	6,297	1.40	1	–
Other parties	5,082	1.13	1	–
Independents	4,029	0.90	1	–
Total	449,916	100.00	147	0
Registered voters/turnout	624,495	–		
Source: Nohlen
