= Plaza de la Constitución (Santiago) =

Town square in Santiago, Chile

Coordinates: 33°26′30″S 70°39′15″W

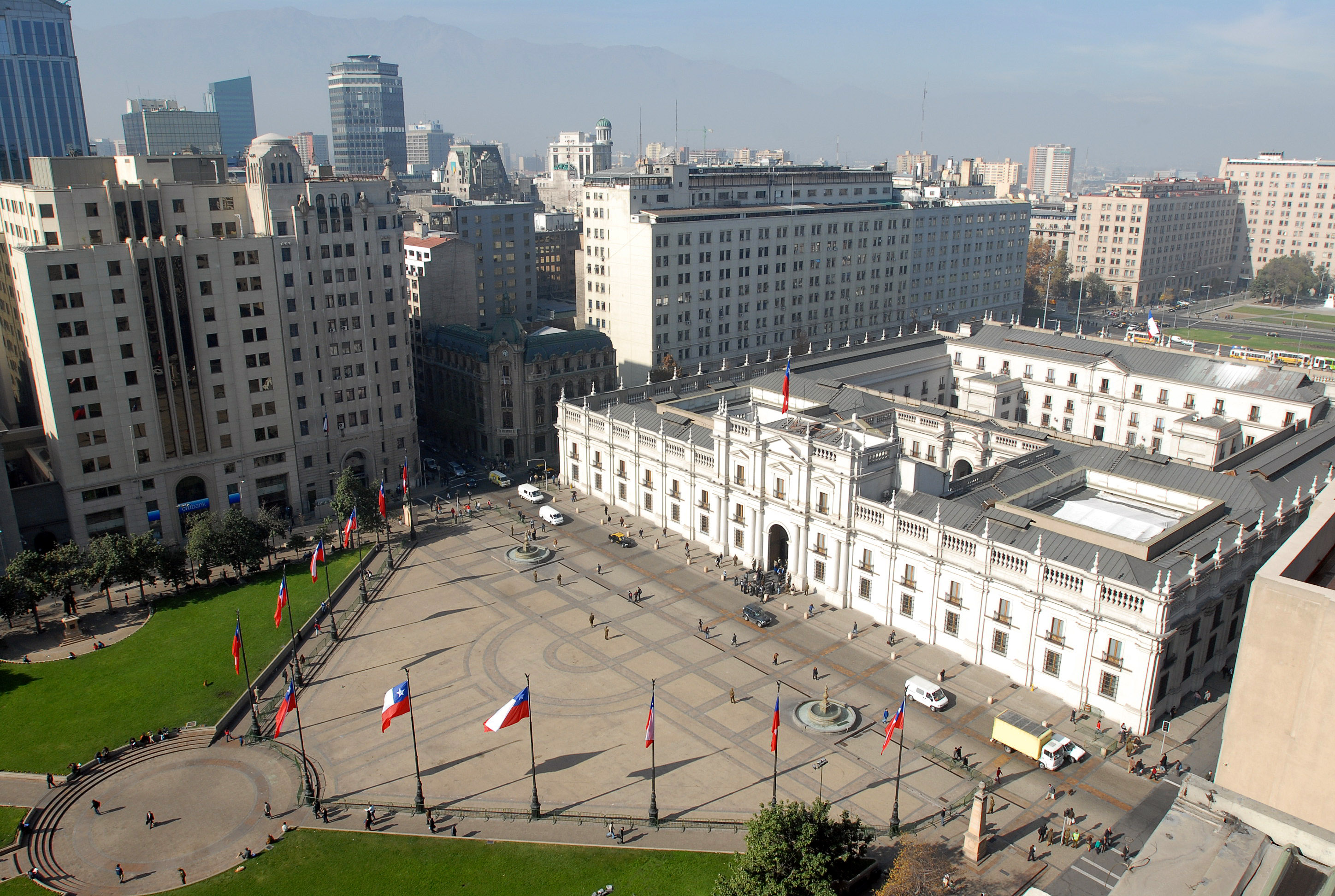
Aerial view of Plaza de la Constitución

The Plaza de la Constitución (English: Constitution Square) is a plaza occupying a full square block in the heart of the civic district of Santiago, Chile. It is located in front of the northern facade of the Palacio de la Moneda and is surrounded by other government buildings such as those housing the Ministry of Finance, Ministry of Foreign Affairs, Ministry of Justice (Edificio del Seguro Obrero), Banco Central de Chile and the Intendencia de Santiago. The square is bounded by Moneda Street on the south, Morandé Street on the east, Agustinas Street on the north, and Teatinos Street on the west.

== History ==
From early days there was a small plaza in front of La Moneda, with a statue of Diego Portales and two fountains, with the Ministry of War opposite. With the appearance of tall buildings in the streets around the Ministry in the late 1920s including some large government buildings, it was decided to clear the entire block. More large government ministries followed either side of La Moneda in the 1930s. The square was planted with trees but was virtually used as a parking lot into the 1970s. After repairs of the damage caused in 1973 to La Moneda was completed in the early 1980s, the square was rebuilt to a design by Cristián Undurraga and Ana Luisa Devés, completed in 1983. Paths, grass, trees, a paved area, and underground parking, were built, and the statue of Portales was relocated to the north end.
