= Edificio del Seguro Obrero =

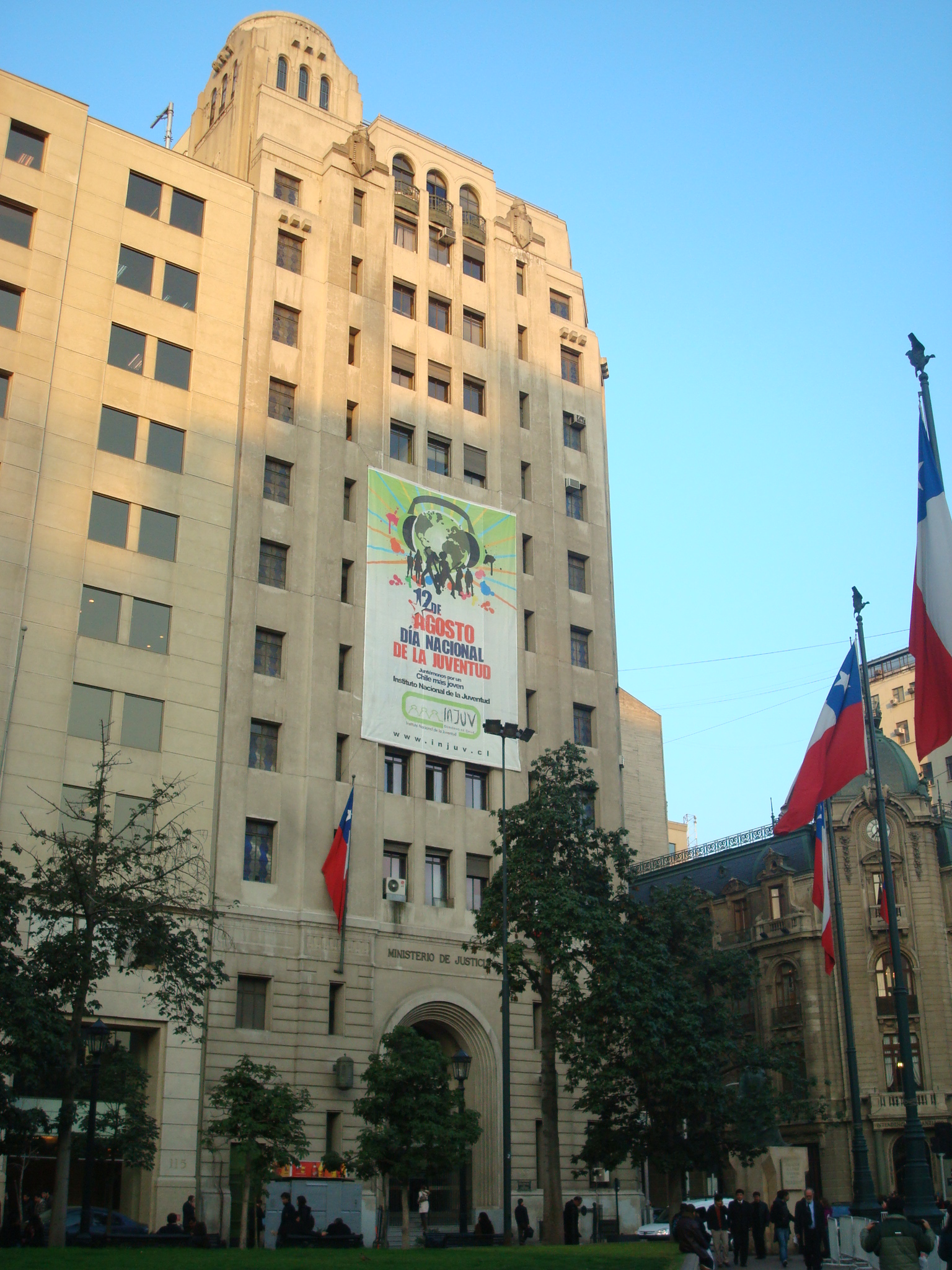
- Interactive map of the Edificio del Seguro Obrero area

General information
- Location: 107 Morandé Street, Santiago

The Seguro Obrero Building is an office building, located in the Civic District of Santiago de Chile, at 107 Morandé Street. Its name comes from the Caja del Seguro Obrero, organization that was originally housed in the building. It presently is occupied by the Ministry of Justice of Chile as its headquarters.

The building is located at the northeast corner of Morandé and Moneda streets. The other corners are occupied by La Moneda Palace, the Edificio de la Intendencia Metropolitana de Santiago and the Plaza de la Constitución.

== History ==
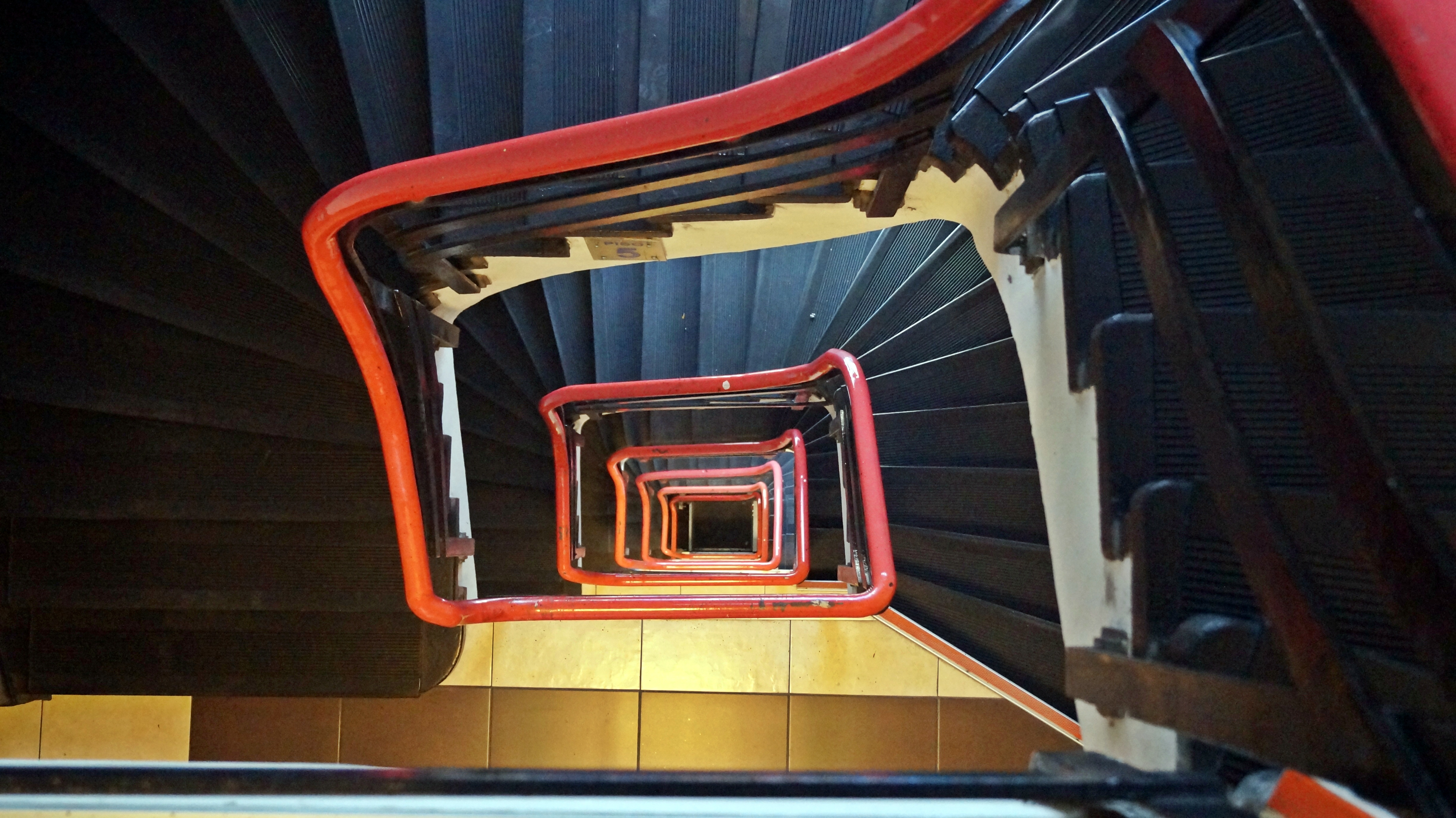
Staircase

The 12-story building was planned for the Caja del Seguro Obrero Obligatorio (Created in 1924) to a design of the architect Ricardo González Cortés, who was influenced by the ideas of the Chicago school and the Art Deco movement. Its construction began in 1928 and was completed in 1931, surpassing the Edificio Ariztía as the tallest office building in Chile.

The building reached notoriety in 1938 when the Seguro Obrero massacre occurred. On September 5 of that year, the building was seized by members of the National Socialist Movement of Chile and a shootout took place between them and the Carabineros. The protesters were shot by the police force inside the building after had surrendered. As a result, 59 of them were killed.

Since November 1989, the building serves as the headquarters for the Ministerio de Justicia.

== See also ==
- List of tallest buildings in Chile
