= Agrarian Party (Chile) =

Agrarian Party Partido Agrario
- Founded: 1931
- Dissolved: 1945
- Merged into: Agrarian Labor Party
- Headquarters: Santiago, Chile
- Ideology: Agrarianism; Regionalism
- Political position: Centre

The Agrarian Party was a political party in Chile, formed in 1931 and dissolved in 1945 to merge with the Popular Freedom Alliance as the Agrarian Labor Party.

== Electoral results ==
- 1932 Chilean general election (142 deputies in total) - 4 deputies elected - 6,580 votes
- 1937 Chilean parliamentary election (146 deputies in total) - 2 deputies elected - 9,721 votes
- 1941 Chilean parliamentary election (147 deputies in total) - 3 deputies elected - 7,723 votes
- 1945 Chilean parliamentary election (147 deputies in total) - 3 deputies elected - 8,750 votes
