= Liceo Francisco Antonio Encina Armanet =

- Las Cabras, Chile

Information
- Type: High school

Liceo Francisco Antonio Encina Armanet (English: Francisco Antonio Ercina Arman High School) is a Chilean high school located in Las Cabras, Cachapoal Province, Chile.

The school is named after a Chilean politician, agricultural businessman, political essayist and historian Francisco Antonio Encina.
