= Carlos Keller =

Chilean writer, historian, and political figure (1898–1974)

- Born: Carlos Keller Rueff; January 3, 1898; Concepción, Chile
- Died: February 28, 1974 (aged 76); San Felipe, Chile
- Education: Free University of Berlin; University of Bonn (BA); University of Würzburg (PhD)
- Occupation: Academic
- Known for: Politician
- Notable work: Spengler y la Situaciòn Politica Cultural de la America Iberica (1927), La Eterna Crisis Chilena (1931)
- Political party: National Socialist Movement of Chile

Carlos Keller Rueff (January 3, 1898 – February 28, 1974) was a far-right Chilean writer, historian, and political figure.

== Early years ==
Keller was born in Concepción, Chile, into a family of German origin and completed his education at universities in Germany. He received his doctorate in 1921 and soon became known as a student of Chilean historian Alberto Edwards and Oswald Spengler, with whom he had struck up a friendship in Germany. His first book, Spengler y la Situaciòn Politica Cultural de la America Iberica (1927) argued for a strong hierarchical basis to Latin American politics in order to preserve Spanish identity.

== Emergence of the Nacis ==
Upon returning to Chile he served as chairman of the cultural organisation the German-Chilean League and in this role had helped to introduce Spengler's thoughts to a Chilean audience. Such was Keller's reputation that when the Ibero-Amerikanische Institut was set up in Berlin in 1930 he was considered as a possible chairman of this prestigious academic body. Keller went to work for the Department of Census and Statistics from 1927, becoming director general in 1931. He also served as a professor at a number of Chilean universities and a journalist. His 1931 book La Eterna Crisis Chilena continued his political work, with him arguing that Chile faced a crisis because it failed to fully adopt Western ways and instead just crudely imitated them. Keller soon met Jorge González von Marées and launched the National Socialist Movement of Chile with him. Keller was not a strict follower of German-style Nazism but instead he saw Chilean nacismo as seeking to do away with the corruption in democracy. He looked to the example of Diego Portales as a strong modernizing dictator and sought to develop Chilean economic independence through the growth of a middle class.

== Later years ==
When the Nacis attempted a coup in 1938 Keller was arrested, although a presidential decree from Pedro Aguirre Cerda saw him released and he returned to study. Keller largely stayed aloof from politics after this (he did not join the rebranded Vanguardia Popular Socialista) and his 1949 novel La Locura de Juan Bernales was seen as an attack on Jorge González von Marées, with whom he had become disillusioned. Keller lived out the remainder of his life as an academic, taking no further role in political activity.
