= Colegio San Agustín (Chile) =

Colegio San Agustin

Location
- Dublé Almeyda 4959; Nunoa; Santiago, Región Metropolitana; Chile
- Coordinates: 33°27′30.13″S 70°34′40″W

Information
- Type: Private
- Motto: Anima una et cor unum in Deum
- Religious affiliations: Roman Catholic; Order of Saint Augustine
- Patron saint: Saint Augustine
- Established: 1885
- Founder: Order of Saint Augustine's Chilean Province
- Principal: Luis Romero
- Language: Spanish
- Campus size: 50,000 square metres (5.0 ha)
- Colors: Blue and yellow
- Yearbook: Toma y Lee
- Budget: 2,285,928,546 CLP
- Website: www.colegiosanagustin.cl

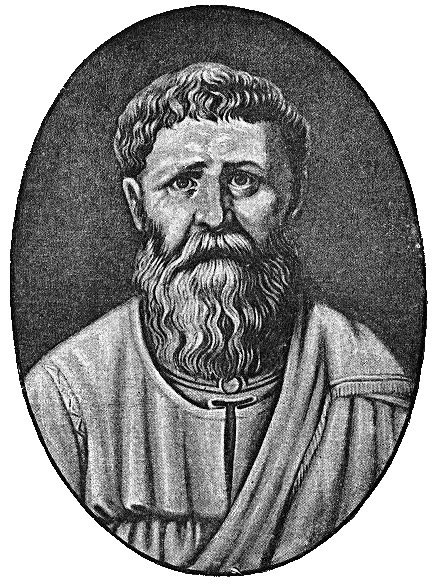
St. Augustine of Hippo as pictured during the Renaissance

Colegio San Agustin (Spanish for "St. Augustine School") in Santiago, Chile is an institution of learning specializing in elementary and secondary education founded in 1885. It is a private school that belongs to the Order of St. Augustine or OSA.

== Patron saint ==
The college is named after the 4th-century saint, St. Augustine of Hippo. Augustine is a key figure in the doctrinal development of Western Christianity and has been declared a "Doctor of the Church" by the Catholic Church. Augustine is often considered to be one of the theological fountainheads of the Protestant Reformation, because of his teachings on salvation and grace; Reformer Martin Luther was an Augustinian friar. Augustine was not a Biblical fundamentalist.
