= Popular Freedom Alliance =

Popular Freedom Alliance Alianza Popular Libertadora
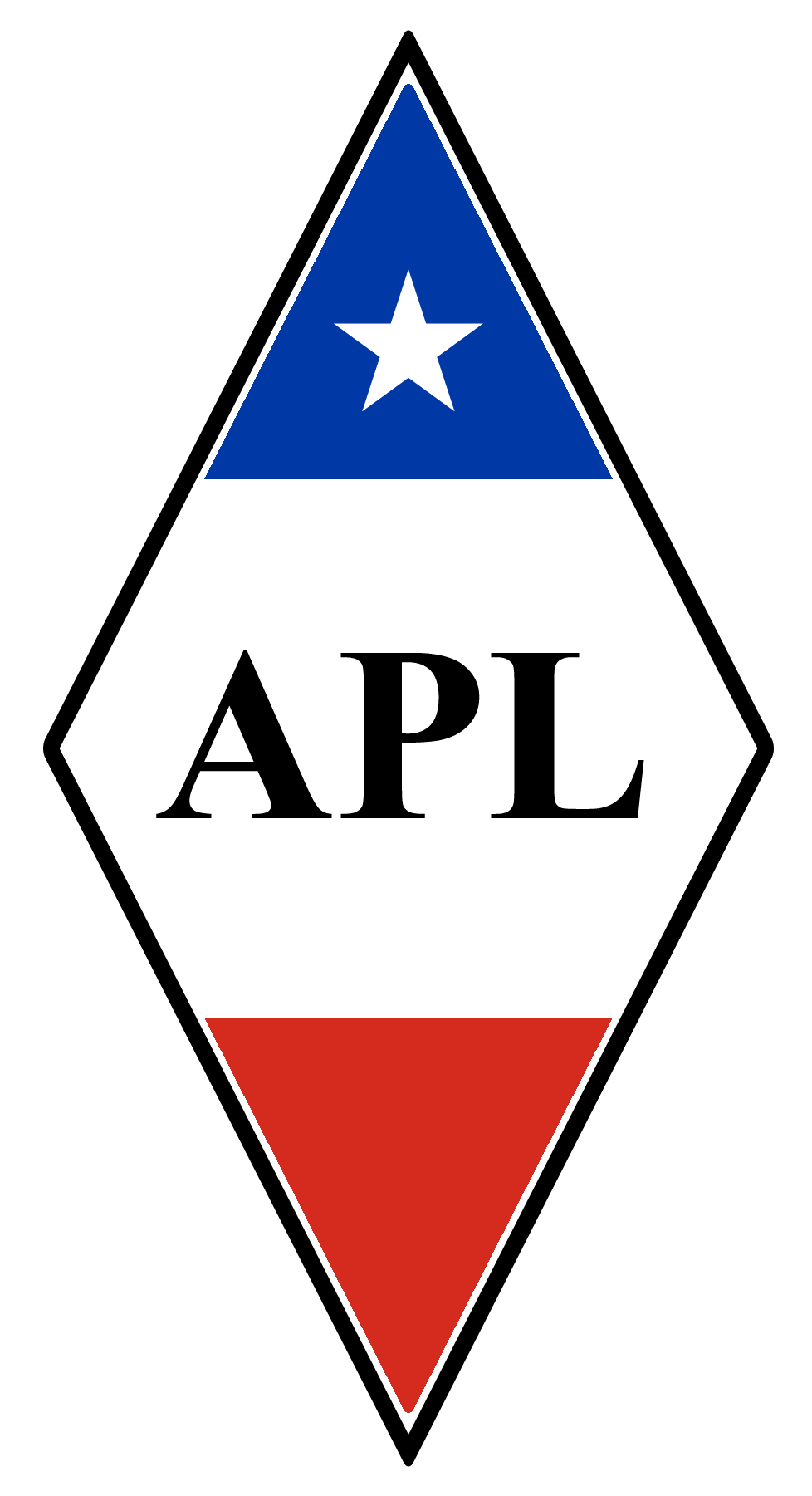
- Founded: 1938
- Dissolved: 1945
- Merger of: National Socialist Movement of Chile; Unión Socialista
- Succeeded by: Agrarian Labor Party
- Headquarters: Santiago de Chile
- Ideology: Nationalism; Populism; Fascism (until 1942)
- Political position: Far right (until 1942); Right-wing

The Popular Freedom Alliance (Spanish: Alianza Popular Libertadora, APL) was a Chilean political party during the Presidential Republic Era, founded in 1938 for the coming presidential election.

It was created in 1938 as an electoral alliance by supporters of General Carlos Ibáñez del Campo, who were members of the Unión Socialista (Socialist Union) and of the Movimiento Nacional Socialista de Chile (National Socialist Movement of Chile, MNS). They later merged to create the APL political party, which was nationalist and populist, and included Fascist elements of the MNS. Some of these MNS elements created an offshoot in 1939, the fascist Vanguardia Popular Socialista (Socialist Popular Avant-Garde, VPS).

Although they supported Ibáñez for the 1938 election, the latter was forced to resign after the Seguro Obrero Massacre which followed an attempted coup by the National Socialist Movement, and Ibáñez decided to oppose Gustavo Ross, whom the MNS had tried to put in power, leading to indirect support of the Radical candidate Pedro Aguirre Cerda, who was ultimately elected.

The APL merged in 1945 with the Agrarian Party to form the Partido Agrario Laborista (PAL).

== Presidential candidates ==
The following is a list of the presidential candidates supported by the Popular Freedom Alliance (Information gathered from the Archive of Chilean Elections).

- 1938: Carlos Ibáñez (lost)
- 1942: Carlos Ibáñez (lost)

== Bibliography ==
- Fuentes, Jordi y Lia Cortes. 1967. Diccionario político de Chile. Editorial Orbe. Santiago.
- Garay, Cristián. 1990. El Partido Agrario Laborista. 1945-1958. Editorial Andrés Bello. Santiago. OCLC 25534586
