= Jorge González von Marées =

Chilean political figure and author (1900–1962)

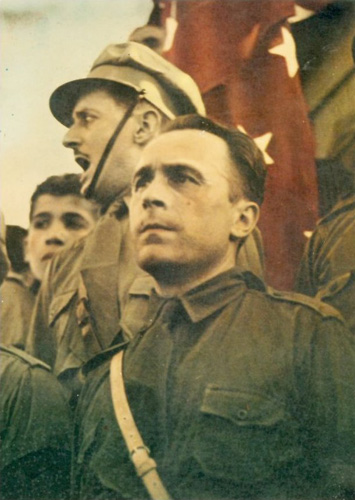
- Born: 4 April 1900; Santiago, Chile
- Died: 14 March 1962 (aged 61); Santiago, Chile
- Other name: El Jefe
- Education: Instituto Nacional; Universidad de Chile
- Occupation: Politician
- Political party: National Socialist Movement of Chile (1932–1939); Popular Socialist Vanguard (1939–1943); Liberal Party (1949–1958)

Jorge González von Marées (4 April 1900 – 14 March 1962), also known as El Jefe (Spanish: The chief, analogous to the Duce) was a Chilean political figure and author who served two terms as a member of the Chamber of Deputies and as mayor of Ñuñoa.

Born in Santiago to Sofía von Marées Sommer, a German noble mother and niece of Hans von Marées, and Marcial González Azócar, physician and founder of Clínica Alemana. He studied in Instituto Nacional General José Miguel Carrera, an elite public school back then, later studying Law and Engineering, the latter incomplete, in Universidad de Chile, Chile's most prestigious public university. He was ideologically influenced by Oswald Spengler. On 5 April 1932 he founded the National Socialist Movement of Chile to oppose democratism, americanism, and communism.

González von Marées organized a failed coup d'état attempt on 5 September 1938, in which 60 young nacista members were shot to death by carabineros, in what became known as the Seguro Obrero massacre. He was sentenced to 20 years imprisonment, but subsequently pardoned by president Pedro Aguirre Cerda. After this, he became leader of the far-right Popular Socialist Vanguard until 1943, when the Chilean Nazi movement disbanded due to the country cutting off all relations with Germany in World War II.

In the late 1940s, von Marées joined the Liberal Party and he eventually appointed secretary general of the party. In 1958, he resigned from the Liberal Party when the party decided to endorse Jorge Alessandri as its presidential candidate.

== Works ==
- González von Marées, Jorge (1932). La concepción nacista del Estado. Santiago, Chile.
- González von Marées, Jorge (1937). El problema del hambre. Santiago, Chile: Editorial Ercilla.
- González von Marées, Jorge (1939). Pueblo y Estado. Santiago, Chile.
- González von Marées, Jorge (1940). El mal de Chile: Sus causas y remedios. Santiago, Chile: Ediciones Diego Portales.

== See also ==
- Carlos Keller
- Chilean political scandals
- Nazism in Chile
