= Popular Socialist Vanguard =

Chilean political party

- Leader: Jorge González von Marées
- Founded: 17 January 1938
- Dissolved: 1942
- Preceded by: National Socialist Movement of Chile
- Succeeded by: Nationalist Union Party of Chile
- Headquarters: Santiago
- Newspaper: Trabajo
- Ideology: Until 1940: Socialism; Anti-imperialism; Anti-fascism; Chilean nationalism From 1940: National Socialism; Anti-Americanism; Anti-communism; Ibañismo; Antisemitism; Chilean nationalism
- Political position: Before 1940: Left-wing; From 1940: Far-right

Party flag

The Vanguardia Popular Socialista (VPS; English: Popular Socialist Vanguard) was a nationalist Chilean political party created in 1938. It was the direct heir of the National Socialist Movement of Chile (MNS) and founded as a consequence of the failed fascist coup in 1938 and its repression.

The party included Jorge González von Marées, while former MNS member Carlos Keller refused to join it. Initially allied with the Chilean left, The party moved back to positions similar to the far-right MNS in 1940. The VPS obtained 2.5% at the 1941 legislative elections, having two deputies elected, one of them being Jorge González von Marées.

The VPS was dissolved in 1942, the majority of its members joining Juan Gómez Millas' far-right Partido Unión Nacionalista de Chile.
