= René Peri Fagerström =

Chilean minister, policeman and writer

Minister of National Assets
- In office 1979–1987
- President: Augusto Pinochet
- Preceded by: Lautaro Recabarren (as Minister of Lands and Colonization)
- Succeeded by: Jorge Veloso

Personal details
- Born: 21 December 1926 Santiago, Chile
- Died: 26 September 1996 (aged 69)
- Occupation: Writer, police officer, politician
- Known for: Minister of National Assets, writer
- Awards: See Awards
- Writing career
- Notable works: Mundo aparte, Ronda rondando, Caranchos, Orilla adentro, A la sombra del monte Fitz Roy

René Peri Fagerström (21 December 1926 – 26 September 1996) was a Chilean writer, police officer, and politician.

He served as Minister of Land and Colonization, and later, as Minister of National Assets during the regime of General Augusto Pinochet, from 1979 to 1987.

Simultaneously holding the rank of Inspector General of Carabineros de Chile, he was also a distinguished writer, receiving numerous awards for his literary works.

== Biography ==
=== Education ===
He attended Liceo Juan Bosco for his primary schooling, later moving to Colegio San Pedro Nolasco, and completed his secondary education at Liceo Federico Hansen. He entered the Carabineros School in 1946 as a cadet officer. In 1961, he participated in a police training observation program in United States.

He graduated in 1963 with a degree in Public Administration from University of Chile. In 1965, he graduated from the Carabineros Police Science Academy and in 1975 took a national security course at the National Academy of Political and Strategic Studies.

=== Professional career ===
He taught commercial law at various state institutions in Antofagasta, Copiapó, La Serena, Valparaíso, San Bernardo, and Punta Arenas, and also taught at the Carabineros training school. Within the institution, he was the head of the First Carabineros Inspection Zone in Antofagasta and the head of the Superior Advisory Council between 1978 and 1979. In 1979, he became Minister of Land and Colonization, a position that was renamed Minister of National Assets in 1980, a position he held until 1987.

He was a journalist member of the Regional Council of the Chilean Journalists Association in Valparaíso. As a journalist, he collaborated with publications such as El Mercurio de Antofagasta, La Prensa Austral of Punta Arenas, El Día of La Serena, La Estrella de Valparaíso, La Tercera, and Las Últimas Noticias. He also served as vice-president of the Club de Deportes La Serena.

=== Literary career ===
As a writer, he was affiliated with various literary circles and associations in Chile. He was an honorary lifelong member of the Institute of Northern Literature, a member of the Chilean Historical Institute, and a member of the Society of Chilean Writers. He was nominated in 1976 for the National Literature Prize.

His work reflects a view of Chile seen through his experiences as a Carabineros officer, contributing details of the national history and enriching the history of the police force. His writings include short stories, novels, poems, and essays. Some of his notable works include Mundo Aparte (1960), Ronda Rondando (1962), Caranchos (1964), Orilla Adentro (1970), Los Dioses Difuntos (1970), and Cuentos de Niños y Pájaros (1979). He is also the author of the novel Dos Mujeres (1975) and the poetry book Turnos (1971).

He also wrote essays such as Los Batallones Bulnes y Valparaíso (1980) and Apuntes y Transcripciones para una Historia de la Función Policial en Chile: 1830-1900 (1982). One of his last successes was A la Sombra del Monte Fitz Roy (1994) about the Laguna del Desierto dispute.

== Awards ==
- Gabriela Mistral Prize in 1962 for his book Ronda Rondando
- Khalil Gibran Prize for his book Orillas Adentro
- Regional Literary Prize Carlos Mondaca Cortés in 1978 for his literary work

== Tributes ==
A street named René Peri Fagerström exists in the Arcos de Pinamar sector of La Serena, Coquimbo Region, Chile.

== Bibliography ==
- Bajo Dos Carabinas. Relatos Policiales (Santiago, Chile: 1977)
- Historia de la Función Policial en Chile: Apuntes y Transcripciones (Santiago, Chile: 1992)
- ¿La Geografía Derrotada?: El Arbitraje de Laguna del Desierto, Campos de Hielo Patagónico Sur (SERSICOM F&E Ltda., Santiago, Chile: 1994)
- A la Sombra del Monte Fitz Roy (Salón Tte. Hernán Merino Correa, Santiago, Chile: 1994)
- ¿Por Qué Perdimos Laguna del Desierto? ¿...Y por Qué Podríamos Perder Campos de Hielo Sur? (Salón Tte. Hernán Merino Correa, Santiago, Chile: 1995)
- La Raza Negra en Chile: Una Presencia Negada (Santiago, Chile: 1999)
