= 1937 Chilean parliamentary election =

Parliamentary elections were held in Chile on 7 March 1937. The Liberal Party and the Conservative Party emerged as the largest parties in the Chamber of Deputies and the Senate.

== Electoral system ==
The term length for Senators was eight years, with around half of the Senators elected every four years. This election saw 20 of the 45 Senate seats up for election.

== Results ==
=== Senate ===
| Party | Votes | % | Seats |
|---|---|---|---|
| Liberal Party | 46,223 | | 7 |
| Conservative Party | 41,473 | | 6 |
| Radical Party | 26,193 | | 3 |
| National Progressive Party | 7,543 | | 1 |
| Democrat Party | 7,004 | | 2 |
| Socialist Party | 6,103 | | 0 |
| Liberal Democratic Party | 5,758 | | 1 |
| National Socialist Movement | 3,858 | | 1 |
| Agrarian Party | 2,187 | | 1 |
| Independents | 2,578 | | 1 |
| Total | | | 20 |
| Total votes | 191,706 | – | |
| Registered voters/turnout | 495,648 | 38.68 | |
Source: Nohlen

=== Chamber of Deputies ===
| Party | Votes | % | Seats | +/– |
|---|---|---|---|---|
| Conservative Party | 87,845 | 21.31 | 35 | +1 |
| Liberal Party | 85,515 | 20.74 | 35 | +9 |
| Radical Party | 76,941 | 18.66 | 29 | –5 |
| Socialist Party | 46,050 | 11.17 | 19 | New |
| Democrat Party | 20,026 | 4.86 | 7 | 0 |
| Democratic Party | 18,676 | 4.53 | 5 | –8 |
| National Progressive Party | 17,162 | 4.16 | 6 | +5 |
| National Socialist Movement | 14,235 | 3.45 | 3 | New |
| Republican Action | 9,802 | 2.38 | 2 | New |
| Agrarian Party | 9,721 | 2.36 | 2 | –2 |
| Other parties | 9,217 | 2.24 | 0 | – |
| Independents | 17,040 | 4.13 | 3 | –1 |
| Total | 412,230 | 100.00 | 146 | +4 |
| Registered voters/turnout | 495,648 | – | | |
Source: Nohlen
