= Guillermo Izquierdo =

Chilean academic, lawyer, and politician

Guillermo Izquierdo Araya
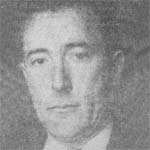
- Guillermo Izquierdo, circa 1941
- Born: April 16, 1902; Santiago, Chile
- Died: August 19, 1988 (aged 86); Santiago, Chile
- Political party: PD, NAP, MNCh, PUN, PAL, Panapo, Padena
- Spouse(s): Rebeca Marfil Cánepa (m. 1925–1956) Bettina Bergmann (m. 1956–1988)
- Children: 4
- Parent(s): Abel Izquierdo Fredes, Elvira Araya Izquierdo
- Relatives: Luis Izquierdo Fredes (uncle), Sebastián Izquierdo Almarza (grandson)

Guillermo Paulino Izquierdo Araya (Santiago, April 16, 1902 – August 19, 1988) was a Chilean academic, lawyer, and politician known for his fascist and nationalist ideology. He was the founder of the Nationalist Movement of Chile (MN), president of the influential Agrarian Labor Party (PAL), and served as a senator from 1953 to 1961.

== Family and education ==
Izquierdo was born in Santiago in 1902, the son of Abel Izquierdo Fredes, a mathematics professor and rector of the School of Arts and Crafts (now University of Santiago), and Elvira Araya Izquierdo, also a mathematics teacher. His paternal grandfather, Guillermo Izquierdo Escudero, was rector of the Liceo de La Serena, and his great-grandfather, Santos Izquierdo y Romero, was a peninsular knight of the Order of Montesa who opposed the First National Government Junta of Chile in 1810. He was also nephew of the politician Luis Izquierdo Fredes.

He studied at the Instituto Nacional and later entered both the Pedagogical Institute and the University of Chile School of Law in 1920, studying History in the mornings and Law in the afternoons. Due to financial needs, he paused his legal studies and graduated as a History and Geography teacher in 1923.

He resumed law studies and became a licensed lawyer in 1931. He also studied at the Chilean Air Force War Academy, graduating as a military instructor in 1938. His law thesis, El Gobierno Representativo, compared the Mussolinian fascist state and the Leninist Soviet state, earning distinction.

He married Rebeca Marfil Cánepa in 1925 and later Bettina Bergmann B. in 1956, with whom he had four children.

== Academic and legal career ==
Izquierdo was active in education from a young age. In 1918–1919, he co-founded a night school association for workers at the Instituto Nacional, alongside Eugenio González Rojas and Sergio Magnan.

He taught at several institutions over 50 years, including the Liceo de Aplicación, the School of Arts and Crafts, the Pontifical Catholic University of Chile, the Universidad de La Plata and the University of Buenos Aires in Argentina, and military academies in Chile.

He also held legal positions including chief legal counsel for the Chilean Hotel Owners Association (1935–1940), advisor to the Chilean-Argentinian Chamber of Commerce, and lawyer for the State Defense Council.

As a journalist, he used the pseudonym “Plutarco” while writing editorials for La Nación (1932–1934). He was also a correspondent and columnist for several Chilean newspapers including El Mercurio, El Diario Ilustrado, El Sur, and El Diario Austral.

Until his death, he was an active member of the Comité Patria y Soberanía (now the Corporation for the Defense of Sovereignty).
