= Edificio de la Intendencia Metropolitana de Santiago =

National monument of Chile

Edificio de la Intendencia Metropolitana
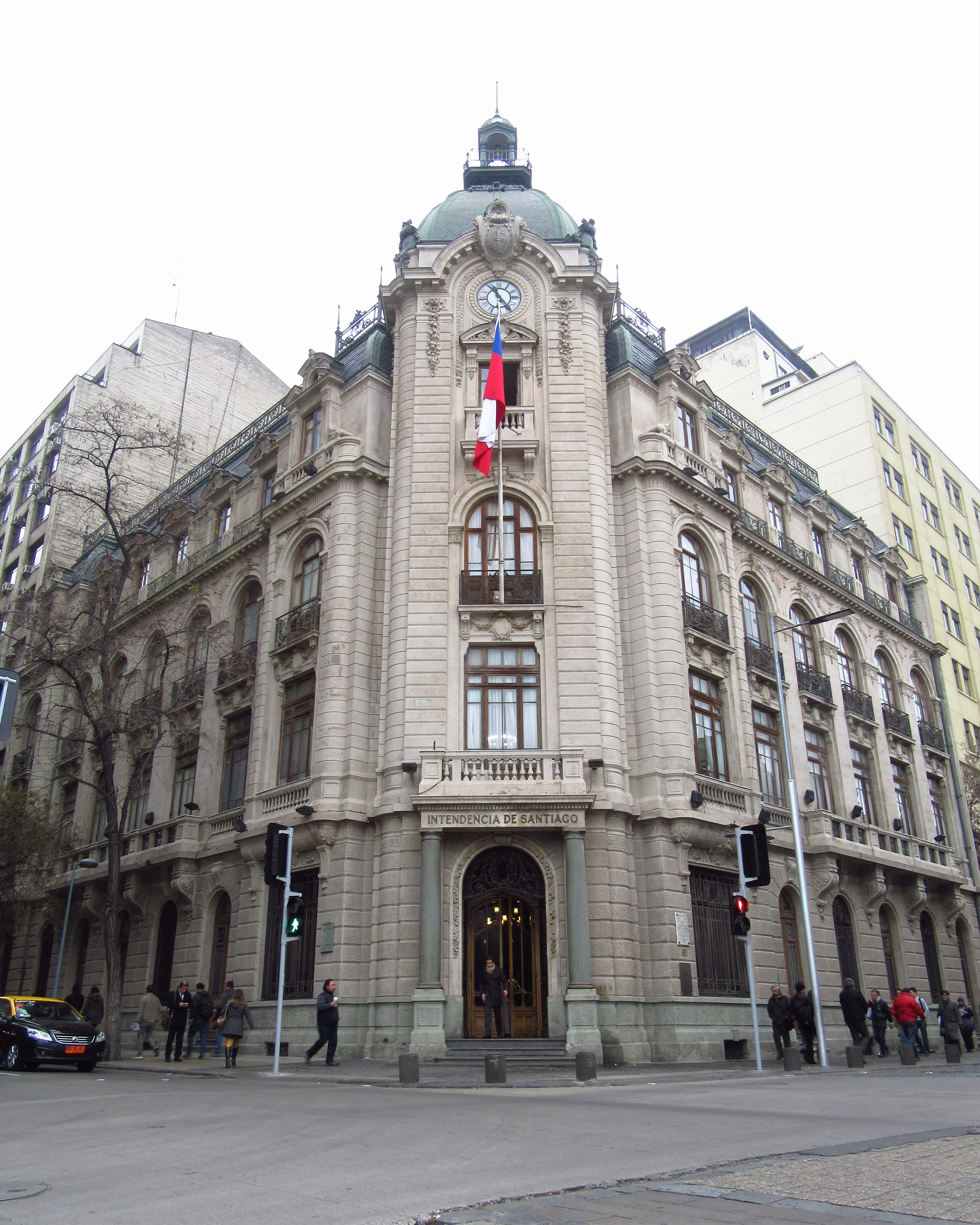
- The building in 2017
- Interactive map of the Edificio de la Intendencia Metropolitana area

General information
- Location: Santiago
- Coordinates: 33°26′32″S 70°39′11″W
- Completed: 1916

Design and construction
- Architect: Manuel Cifuentes

The Edificio de la Intendencia Metropolitana is a government building housing the Intendencia for the Santiago Metropolitan Region, in Santiago, Chile. It is located in the very heart of the civic district of Santiago, at 93 Morandé Street–at the southeast corner of Morandé and Moneda streets–, close to the Palacio de La Moneda. It was originally built to house El Diario Ilustrado, a newspaper that occupied the building until 1928, when the newspaper owners sold the building to the government of Chile to accommodate offices for the Intendencia de Santiago.

== History ==
The origins of this historic corner site go back to 1722, when the captain of the Royal Navy of France, Juan Francisco Briand de Morandais –a last name that was subsequently hispanized as Morandé, the current street name–, along with his wife Juana Caxyal y Solar, occupied a parcel of land located on Francisco de Riberos Street (present-day Moneda Street).

After passing from owner to owner for nearly two centuries, Joaquín Echenique Gandarillas and Alberto González Errázuriz, owners of the El Diario Ilustrado –newspaper founded in 1902–, purchased the site in 1908 to build there the newspaper headquarters. It was said by historians that the choice of such strategic location was to closely watch the work of the government, parliamentarians, the justice and the commerce, all of them with headquarters close to the chosen site.

The construction of the building began in 1914 following the design of architect Manuel Cifuentes Gomez, and was officially opened in 1916. Other people involved in the project included: engineer Auclair and constructor Félix Margoz. The building housed the Diario Ilustrado until 1928, when the then President of Chile, Carlos Ibáñez del Campo acquired the building to house there the Intendencia.

== Architecture ==
The building presents facades to Morandé and Moneda streets. Its chamfered corner is topped by a clock cupola. The clock is German in origin and has bells made in early 1900 by Las Rosas Foundry. There are marble stairs to give access to the four-storey building. Finish materials included plaster, wood, iron and bronze. The building includes many columns and rooms like the main office (which occupies the Intendent of Santiago), a meeting room and a library.

The building features a stained glass dome whose eight lower sections were designed by painter Pedro Subercaseaux. These depict eight topics of, current and past, national relevance: The Homeland, The Chilean Navy, The Mining, The Education, The Prayer, The Sciences, The Communications and The Harvest.

The building was declared as a National Monument in 1976.

== GAP Memorial Plaque ==
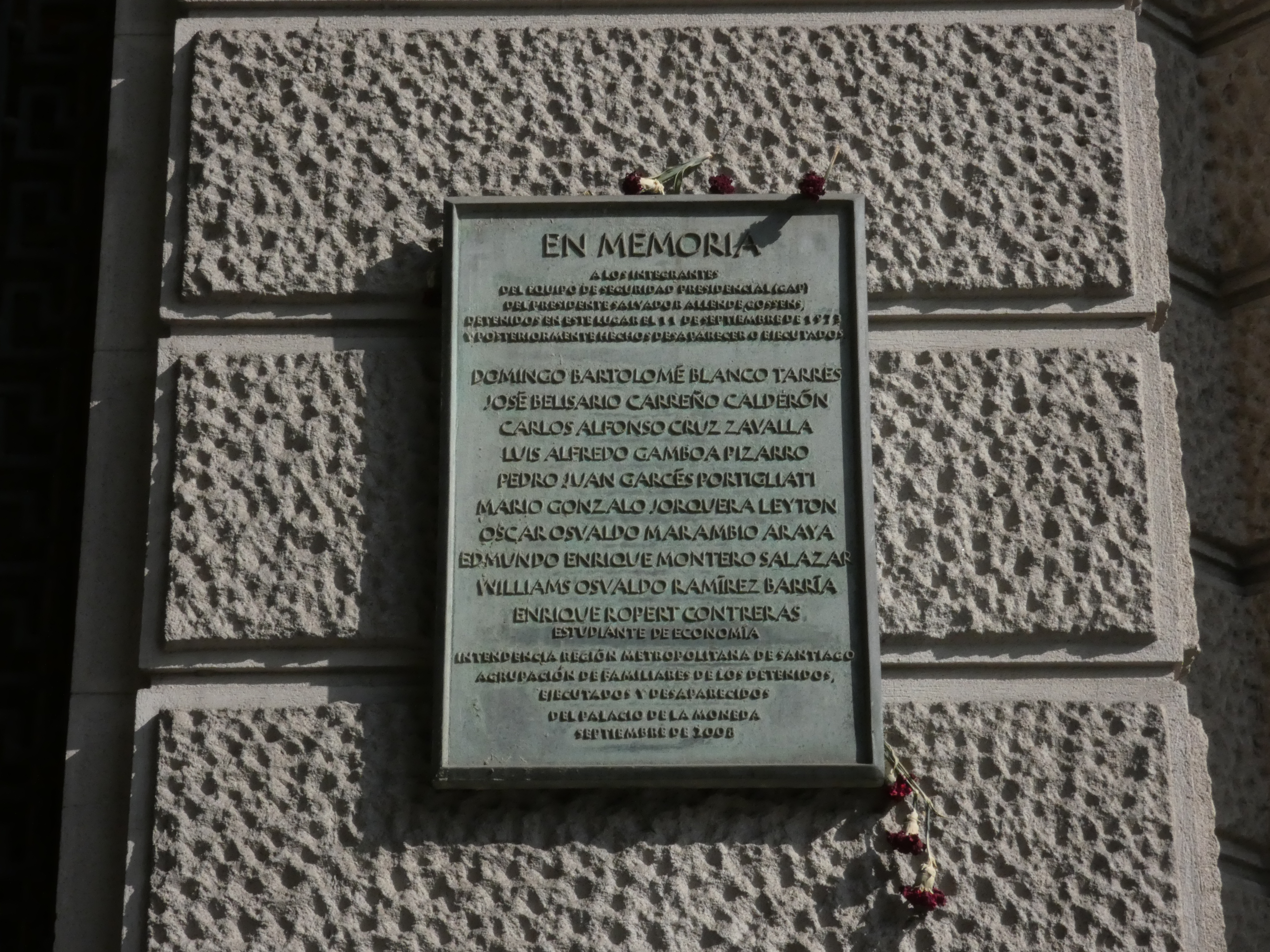
Memorial Plaque

During the 1973 Chilean coup d'état, confrontations occurred between the military forces and the GAP members who were defending Salvador Allende in La Moneda. Members of the bodyguards of the president were detained at the Edificio de la Intendencia and then were killed or disappeared after the coup d'état.

On 11 September 2008 was installed a memorial plaque for the remembrance of the GAP members.
