= Alberto Edwards =

Chilean historian (1874–1932)

Alberto Edwards Vives
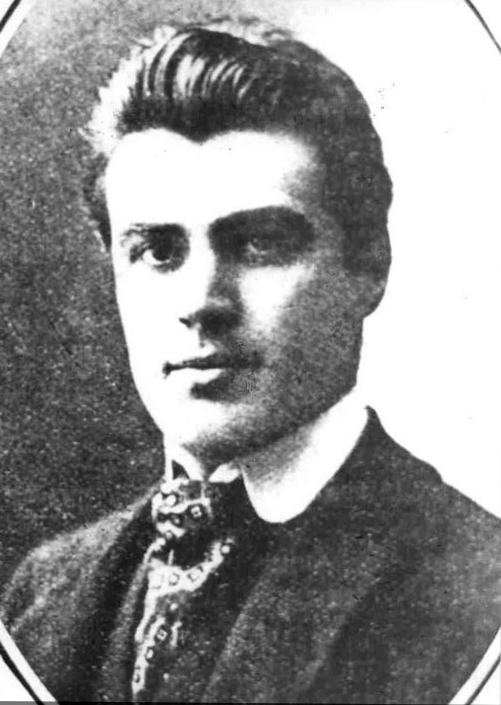

Minister of Justice
- In office 23 July 1931 – 26 July 1931
- President: Carlos Ibáñez del Campo
- Preceded by: Guillermo Edwards Matte
- Succeeded by: Luis Gutiérrez Alliende

Minister of Foreign Affairs
- In office 23 July 1931 – 26 July 1931
- President: Carlos Ibáñez del Campo
- Preceded by: Guillermo Edwards Matte
- Succeeded by: Luis Gutiérrez Alliende

Minister of Public Education
- In office 11 August 1930 – 28 April 1931
- President: Carlos Ibáñez del Campo
- Preceded by: Bartolomé Blanche
- Succeeded by: Gustavo Lira Manso

Minister of Finance
- In office 20 November 1926 – 9 February 1927
- President: Emiliano Figueroa
- Preceded by: Lautaro Rosas
- Succeeded by: Pablo Ramírez Rodríguez

Member of the Chamber of Deputies
- In office 15 May 1909 – 15 May 1912
- Constituency: Valparaíso and Casablanca

Personal details
- Born: 25 November 1874 Valparaíso, Chile
- Died: 3 April 1932 (aged 57) Santiago, Chile
- Spouse: Magdalena Vives
- Education: Pontifical Catholic University of Chile; University of Chile (LL.B)
- Profession: Lawyer

Luis Alberto Edwards Vives (25 November 1874 in Valparaíso – 3 April 1932 in Santiago) was a Chilean historian, nationalist politician and lawyer. He was a member of the influential Edwards family. His most famous work (highly influenced by Oswald Spengler and the German Conservative Revolution) was La fronda aristocrática en Chile (1928). This analyzed the history of Chile in the 19th century as a conflict between the authoritarian state and the aristocracy.

== Politician ==
Edwards was member of the National (Montt-Varist) Party, and its deputy from 1909 to 1912 representing Valparaíso and Casablanca. In 1915 he founded the Nationalist Party along with Francisco Antonio Encina and Guillermo Subercaseaux.

Edwards served as a Minister of Finance in the presidency of Emiliano Figueroa Larraín from November 1926 to February 1927. During the government of Carlos Ibáñez del Campo, a proto-fascist president, he headed several Ministries: Education from October 1930 to April 1931; Foreign Affairs in July 1931; and Justice in late 1931.
