= National Socialist Movement of Chile =

Far-right political party in Chile from 1932 to 1938

National Socialist Movement of Chile Movimiento Nacional Socialista de Chile
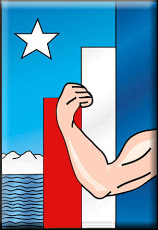
- Leader: Jorge González von Marées
- Founded: April 5, 1932; 94 years ago
- Dissolved: January 1938; 88 years ago
- Preceded by: Nationalist Action of Chile
- Succeeded by: Popular Socialist Vanguard
- Student wing: Grupo Nacista Universitario
- Youth wing: Juventud Nacista
- Women's wing: Brigadas Femeninas
- Paramilitary wing: Tropas Nacistas de Asalto
- Membership: approx. 22,000 (1939 est.)
- Ideology: Nazism; Fascism; Corporatism; Chilean nationalism
- Political position: Far-right
- Electoral alliance: Popular Freedom Alliance
- Anthem: ¡Chileno, a la acción! (lit. 'Chilean, take action!')

Flag of the Patria Vieja
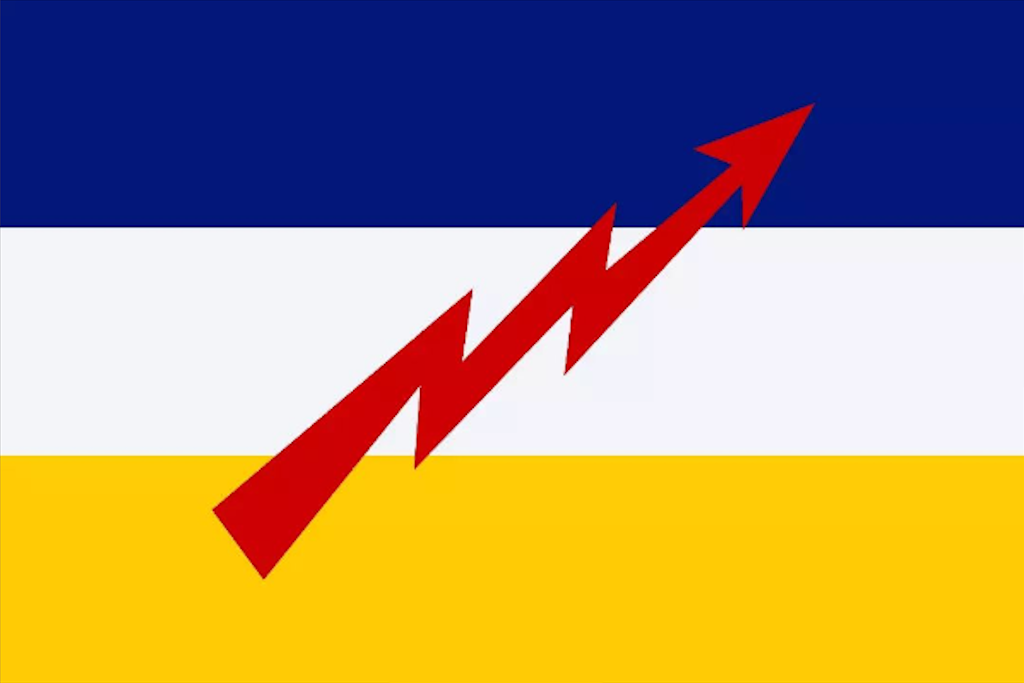
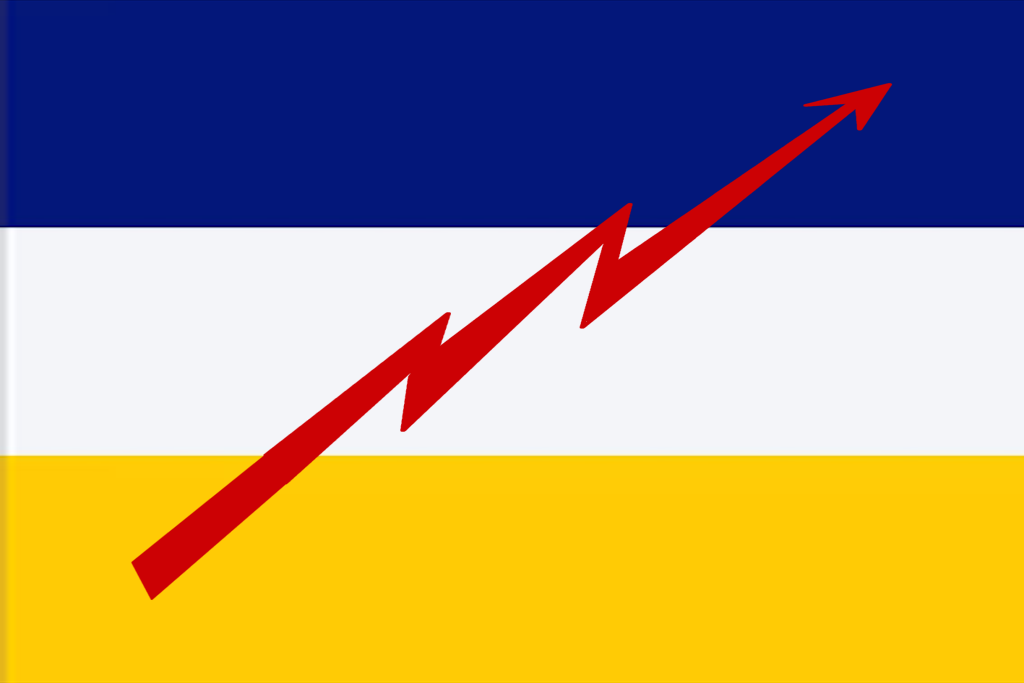
- Other flag: Bandera MNSCh alternativa

The National Socialist Movement of Chile (MNS or MNSCh), also called the Nacista Party, was a political party in Chile with National Socialist and fascist influence that existed from 1932 to 1939. It was founded on 5 April 1932 by the lawyer Jorge González von Marées (its spokesman), the sociologist and economist Carlos Keller (its principal ideologue), and the retired officer Francisco Javier Díaz Valderrama.

In the 1937 parliamentary elections it won three deputies. In 1938 the MNS, together with other groups, formed the Alianza Popular Libertadora (APL) and supported the candidacy of Carlos Ibáñez del Campo. In early 1939 the MNS was reorganized and shifted leftward, adopting the name Vanguardia Popular Socialista (VPS).

Note on dates: some summary formats use 1938 to mark the post–Seguro Obrero collapse of the movement’s effective political role, while other accounts describe a formal reorganization and name change in early 1939.

== History ==
=== Origins ===
The movement began to take shape in March 1932, when Francisco Javier Díaz Valderrama, a retired officer and former Inspector General of the Army, invited the economist, sociologist, and historian Carlos Keller—author of the controversial text La eterna crisis chilena—to his home. Keller’s work described the social, political, economic, and moral consequences facing Chilean society following the world economic crisis of 1929. Present at Díaz’s home was also the lawyer Jorge González von Marées, who that day turned 32. Díaz knew that González was strongly interested in political action, and showed him a Spanish translation—prepared by Díaz himself—of the NSDAP program associated with Adolf Hitler, which Díaz was interested in applying to a Chilean National Socialist party. It was from this meeting between Keller, González, and Díaz that the idea of founding the MNS emerged. Díaz was the principal promoter of the initiative, while Keller and González became its main leaders.

The National Socialist Movement of Chile was officially founded on 5 April 1932 at a meeting held in González von Marées’s professional office, located at 1225 Agustinas Street in Santiago. The founding group included Jorge González—who assumed the role of “chief” (jefe)—Mauricio Mena, Carlos Keller, Fernando Calvo Larraín, Luis Felipe Lazo, Juan de Dios Valenzuela, and Gustavo Vargas Molinare. On that occasion the movement also approved its first political program, written by Keller.

In the context of interwar politics, the MNS positioned itself as a disciplined, activist alternative to parliamentary party competition, drawing on European fascist organizational models while framing its agenda as a response to political fragmentation and social crisis. This orientation helped shape both its internal structure and its emphasis on propaganda, youth mobilization, and street-level activism.

Initially, members of the MNS, known as nacistas, (Note: Members of the Movimiento Nacional-Socialista de Chile (MNS) took care to present themselves as nacis with a “c” to distinguish themselves from the German nazis. Their contemporaries recognized this distinction, and the “c” has remained standard in the historiography on the period.) clashed with members of opposing political currents, including both the conservative and liberal right as well as Marxist and Stalinist groups, and therefore created the “Tropas Nacistas de Asalto” (TNA) in 1933—modeled on the Sturmabteilung (SA) of Nazi Germany—whose principal role was protection and deterrence; four of its militants died in violent street confrontations.

=== Organization ===
Like European fascist movements, the MNS was characterized by a strongly hierarchical and militarized organizational structure. Its principal premises were order and discipline, and its highest authority was the “Chief” (Jefe), responsible for setting political, social, and economic orientations and directing the movement’s ideological and practical course.

In practice, this leadership-centered design was intended to concentrate decision-making, enforce uniform messaging, and coordinate national expansion through provincial nuclei. The MNS also invested heavily in forming youth and student cadres, which served both as recruitment pipelines and as vehicles for ideological training and public demonstrations.

There was also a “Nacista Council” (CN), an advisory body to the chief composed of ten members chosen by him. Another body was the “Directive Committee” (CD), formed by the directors of the six departments. The departments were:

- Preparation Department (PR): responsible for the foundations of “nacista doctrine” and its dissemination through pamphlets, lectures, and books. Under its authority was the “Nacista Library”.
- Provinces Department (P): directed the movement’s local nuclei throughout the country. Its function was to standardize organization in the provinces, and it was to organize and direct a “Secret Agents Service” for the collection of confidential information across Chile.
- Propaganda Department (PRO): responsible for dissemination, including pamphlets, lectures, and events.
- Administrative Department (A): organized the movement’s treasury service, and also supervised administration of party premises and services handling funds.
- Tropas Nacistas de Asalto Department (TNA): organized actions of the movement’s “shock group”. The director held the rank of brigadier general and oversaw the TNA across Chile.
- Nacista Youth Department (JNS): brought together young people aged 14 to 18 who did not meet the age requirements to be active members of the MNS.

=== Symbols and uniform ===
The banner used by the MNS consisted of the Chilean flag of the Patria Vieja, in honor of the heroes of Chilean independence. The party emblem consisted of a muscular arm on a tricolor background, placed over a design representing the sky with the Lone Star, the Andes, and the sea.

Uniforms and symbols functioned as tools of internal cohesion and public visibility. In street politics, the movement’s distinct iconography and disciplined formations were intended to project modernity, order, and strength, while distinguishing nacistas from both conservative elites and left-wing militants.

The militant’s uniform consisted of a dark gray shirt, along with a tie and a military-style cap of the same color. Attached to the cap was an insignia bearing the muscular arm of the worker. The outfit was complemented by a dark brown cross-strap, whose belt buckle was circular, with a lightning bolt similar to that on the organization’s flag at its center.

=== Propaganda and media ===
To defend and disseminate its programmatic lines, the party published a page on Tuesdays and Saturdays in the afternoon newspaper El Imparcial. Later it issued its own newspaper, Trabajo (1933), and the magazine Acción Chilena (1934), the latter edited by Keller. It also had an official radio station, Radio Difusión Santa Lucía.

Beyond basic messaging, the MNS used its press and public events to promote a narrative of national regeneration, discipline, and collective duty. These outlets also supported recruitment and helped coordinate activity across Santiago and provincial branches, especially during election cycles and periods of intensified street conflict.

=== Electoral participation and influence ===
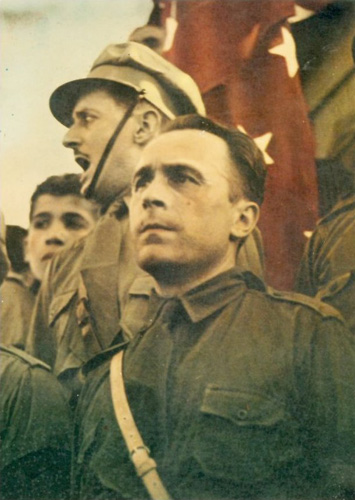
Jorge González von Marées, leader of the movement, c. 1939.

Shortly after being founded, the group penetrated trade unions and also groups within Chile’s middle and upper classes, and by 1935 it had more than 20,000 militants across the country, mainly in major cities and in southern Chile, with an important presence in university student federations, even reaching the presidency of the FECh. The MNS initially found support among the German community in Chile and among Chileans of German descent, although over time this relationship weakened as the party moved toward ideological positions more closely tied to Chilean nationalism, including criticism of the non-assimilation of German colonies into Chilean nationality.

The movement’s electoral strategy combined conventional campaigning with mass mobilization and demonstrations. Its activism also aimed to build a reputation for decisiveness and order, contrasting the MNS with both liberal parliamentarism and Marxist revolutionary politics.

It took part unsuccessfully in the 1932 parliamentary elections and in the 1935 municipal elections. In the 1937 parliamentary elections it elected three deputies to the Chamber of Deputies of Chile: Jorge González von Marées for Santiago, Fernando Guarello Fitz-Henry for Valparaíso, and Gustavo Vargas Molinare for Temuco. By contrast, Keller was defeated in his bid in Osorno. The party received a total of 14,564 votes nationwide.

Despite the rejection it generated in the National Congress and the swift lifting of González’s parliamentary immunity, the nacistas participated actively in certain legislative initiatives, such as the creation of what would become the Corporación de Fomento de la Producción (CORFO), an extraordinary tax on U.S. companies extracting copper in Chile, the right to women’s vote, the suspension of foreign debt payments, and the creation of Chile’s exclusive economic zone in the Pacific Ocean.

The MNS won 29 municipal councillors (regidores) in the 1938 municipal elections. That same year, together with other groups, it formed the APL, led by General Ibáñez del Campo, who became the presidential candidate in the 1938 election. On 4 September that year the “March of Victory” (Marcha de la victoria) took place, one of the largest mass gatherings of the era, attracting around 100,000 people.

=== The Seguro Obrero massacre and shift to socialism ===
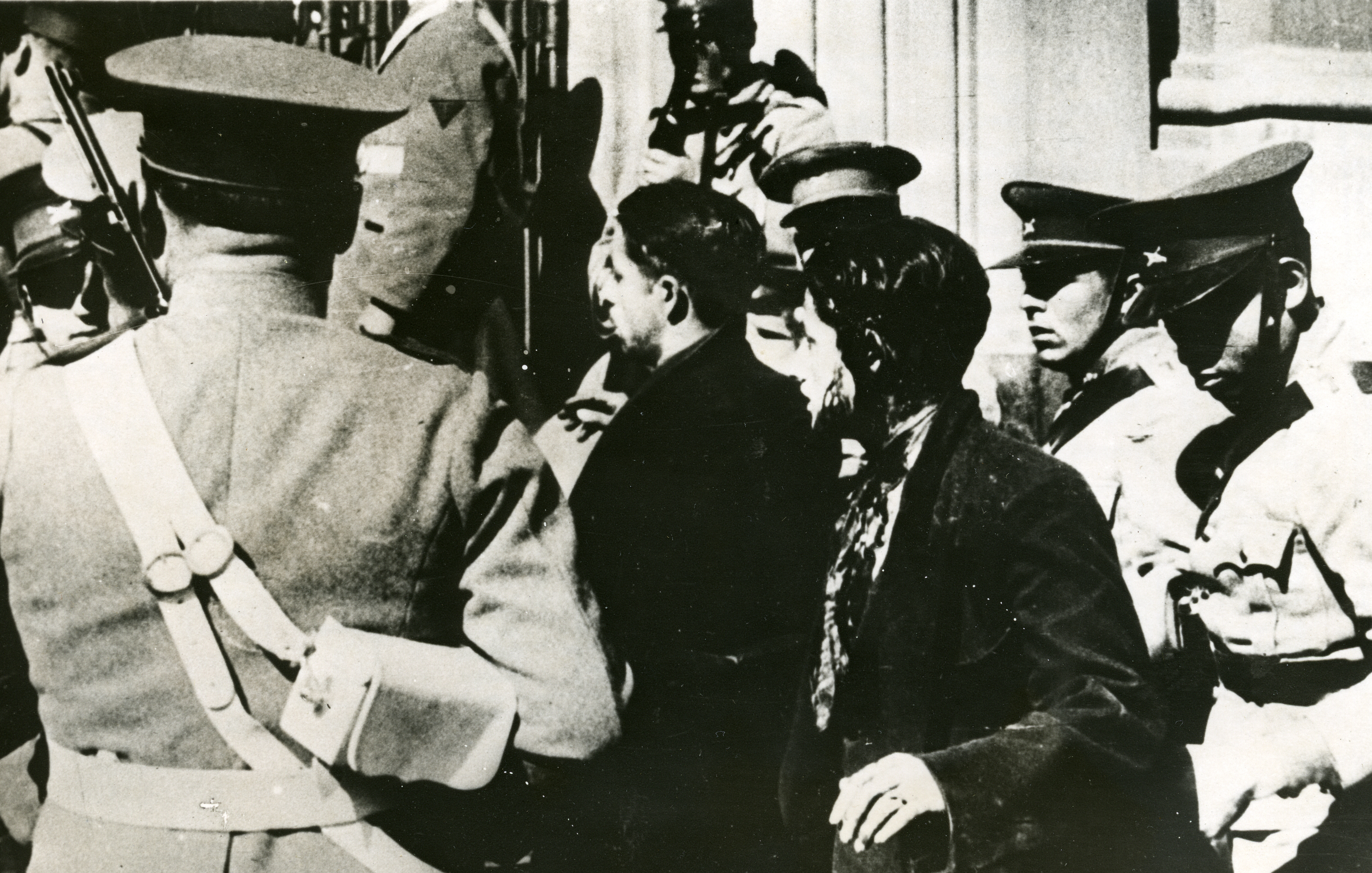
MNS members taken by Carabineros to the Seguro Obrero building, where they were killed (5 September 1938).

The day after the “March of Victory”, on 5 September 1938, around 60 armed MNS youths seized the Caja del Seguro Obrero building and the University of Chile’s main headquarters in an attempt to force a coup d'état that would overthrow President Alessandri Palma and install General Ibáñez in power. The coup was thwarted and the nacistas laid down their arms after being promised their lives would be spared, but they were subsequently executed. The event caused widespread public shock, and González surrendered to the Carabineros, acknowledging responsibility in a letter.

González was detained. Public opinion largely blamed the government and President Alessandri for the massacre. Members of the APL decided to withdraw Ibáñez’s candidacy and, in retaliation against the government, supported the rival candidate Aguirre Cerda of the Popular Front, who defeated the government-backed Ross Santa María by a narrow margin, generally attributed to nacista votes.

In January 1939 the National Socialist Movement of Chile renamed itself the VPS. However, the change led the great majority of militants to leave the party due to its leftward shift, which they viewed as a betrayal of its fundamental principles. This, combined with the decline of Chilean nacismo—often incorrectly equated with German Nazism after the outbreak of the Second World War—contributed to the dissolution of the VPS in 1942. In addition, a second group split off, the National Fascist Party (PNF), led by Raúl Olivares and Osvaldo Gatica.

A small faction of the MNS, led by Keller, remained active until 1941.

== Ideology ==
The ideology of the MNS was based on the national-corporatist doctrines of the German NSDAP—while rejecting racial doctrines central to Hitler’s worldview, which González von Marées characterized as a “materialist equivalent” of class struggle—along with Italian fascism and the ideological conception associated with Diego Portales.

To many observers, the MNS represented a form of “non-European fascism” that adapted interwar radical-right themes to Chilean political conditions, blending corporatism and nationalism with an emphasis on discipline, hierarchy, and state primacy in economic and social life.

In its early years, the party adopted a Germanophile stance and was strongly influenced by German National Socialist ideology, emphasizing antisemitism. This was reflected in the movement’s press, which received advertising support from German firms and Chileans of German descent, and aligned itself with Nazi Germany and its policies. However, unlike German Nazism, antisemitism did not become the dominant ideological element in the movement’s discourse. According to Keller, the MNS was initially interested in applying the original NSDAP program, which had been translated into Spanish by Díaz Valderrama. The Nazi Party newspaper Völkischer Beobachter even praised Díaz, highlighting his ties to Germany and his dedication to establishing National Socialism in Chile. The MNS also established relations with Germany and received financial and material support.

The movement opposed both Marxism and transnational capitalism, and regarded labour as a fundamental value of human life. It defined itself as anti-liberal, anti-parliamentarian, anti-imperialist, and socialist in a non-Marxist sense.

The MNS advocated the creation of a one-party state based on authoritarianism,[14] order, hierarchy, and social justice,[13] and the unity of social classes instead of class struggle. It also supported the expulsion of communists and foreigners from Chile. On social and cultural matters, the party held conservative positions, particularly regarding gender roles, defining women’s primary function as wives and mothers, although it maintained a significant female membership.[13]

However, in March 1938, González distanced himself from fascism, criticized Nazi Germany, and attacked both the German community in Chile and Chileans of German descent, describing Nazism as a foreign ideological penetration. He also stated that adopting the name “National Socialist” had been a mistake and that it had been chosen largely to capitalize on the success of Nazism in Europe. Following this shift, the MNS was reorganized in 1939 as the VPS. Despite this ideological transformation, some former members continued to support Nazism, while others regrouped around alternative far-right projects.

== Legacy ==
Although the MNS was short-lived as a significant electoral force, it remains a central case study in the historiography of interwar Chilean politics and Latin American fascism. Scholars have analyzed it as an example of a fascist-inspired movement that attempted to adapt European organizational models and ideological themes to local political conditions, while ultimately being shaped by Chile’s party system, state institutions, and the aftermath of the Seguro Obrero massacre.

Its decline following 1938 has also been linked to shifting public perceptions of Nazism and fascism as international tensions escalated in the late 1930s and early 1940s, and to the fragmentation of the movement’s former militants into successor or splinter projects, including the VPS and other far-right organizations described in contemporary accounts.

== Electoral results ==
=== Municipal elections ===
Election	Votes	%	Councillors
1935	6,000 (est.)	1.8%	2
1938	22,500 (est.)	4.63%	14

=== Parliamentary elections ===
Election	Deputies			Senators		
Election	Votes	%	Seats	Votes	%	Seats
1932	961	0.29%	0			0
1937	14,564	3.50%	3	3,858	2.01%	0

== See also ==
- Nazism in Chile
- Presidential Republic (1925–1973)

== Bibliography ==
- Blamires, Cyprian (2006). World Fascism: A–K. ABC-CLIO. p. 127. ISBN 978-1576079409.
- Deutsch, Sandra McGee (1999). Las Derechas: the extreme right in Argentina, Brazil, and Chile, 1890-1939. Stanford University Press. p. 159. ISBN 978-0804732086.
- Etchepare, J. A.; Stewart, H. I. (1995). "Nazism in Chile: A particular type of Fascism in South America". Journal of Contemporary History. 30 (4): 577–605. doi:10.1177/002200949503000402.
- Friedman, Max Paul (2003). Nazis and Good Neighbors. Cambridge University Press. p. 52. ISBN 978-0521823159.
- Klein, Marcus (2004). "The Chilean Movimiento Nacional Socialista, the German-Chilean Community, and the Third Reich, 1932–1939: Myth and Reality". The Americas. 60 (4): 589–616. doi:10.1353/tam.2004.0057.
- Sznajder, Mario (1993). "A Case of Non-European Fascism: Chilean National Socialism in the 1930s". Journal of Contemporary History. 28 (2): 269–296. doi:10.1177/002200949302800204.
- Cabello, Antonio (2000). "El nacional-socialismo chileno. Breve sinopsis" (PDF). Pharos (in Spanish). 7 (2): 79–84.
- Möller, Magdalena (2000). El Movimiento Nacional Socialista Chileno (1932–1938) (PDF) (in Spanish). Santiago: Pontificia Universidad Católica de Chile.
- Gazmuri, Cristián (2012). Histografía chilena (1842–1970) (in Spanish). Penguin Random House. ISBN 978-956-347-127-4.
- Urzúa Valenzuela, Germán (1992). Historia política de Chile y su evolución electoral desde 1810 a 1992 (in Spanish). Santiago: Editorial Jurídica de Chile.
