= Seguro Obrero massacre =

1938 retaliation by Chilean authorities against a failed coup by National Socialists

- Part of the interwar period
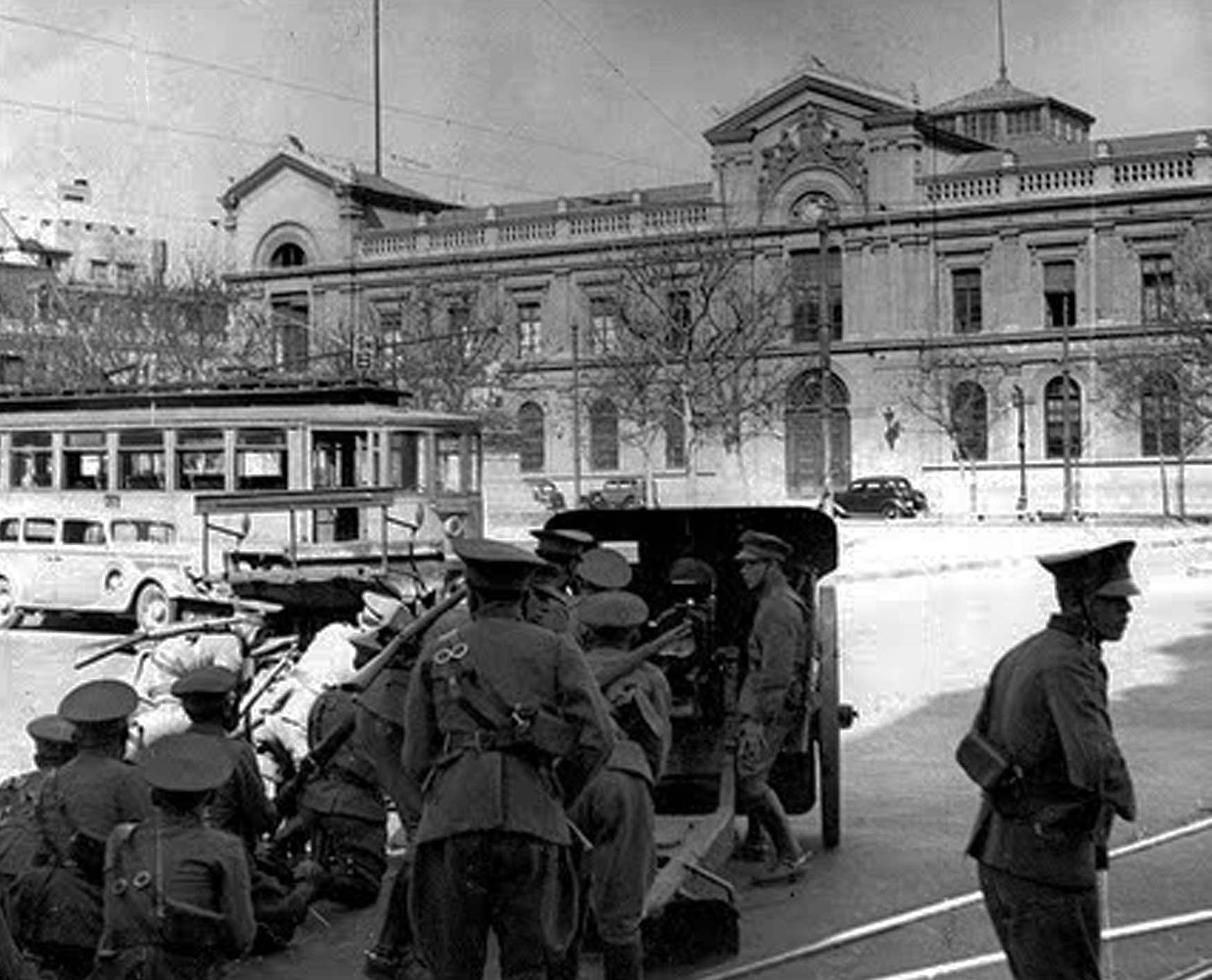
- Troops of the Tacna Regiment pulling a cannon towards the occupied University of Chile building
Date	5 September 1938
Location	Santiago de Chile, Chile
Result	Chilean government victory: Surrendered rebels summarily executed; Ibañez is arrested and his candidacy is revoked; Arrest of Jorge González Von Marées and Óscar Jiménez

Belligerents
Nacistas; Tropas Nacistas de Asalto (TNA)	Chilean Army; “Buin” Infantry Regiment; “Tacna” Artillery Regiment; Carabineros de Chile; La Moneda Palace Guard

Commanders and leaders
Jorge González von Marées (Chile) Carlos Ibáñez del Campo	(Chile) Arturo Alessandri (Chile) Óscar Novoa (Chile) Humberto Arriagada Valdivieso

Strength
64 rebels	2 artillery pieces c. 100 carabineros c.100 soldiers

Casualties and losses
60 killed	1 killed
- 2 civilians killed by Carabineros

The Seguro Obrero massacre (Spanish: Matanza del Seguro Obrero, lit. 'Workers Insurance's Massacre') occurred on 5 September 1938, and was the Chilean government's response to an attempted coup d'état by the National Socialist Movement of Chile (MNSCh), whose members were known at the time as Nacistas ("Nazis"). The Nacistas occupied the central building at the University of Chile and the Seguro Obrero building. Because the Nacistas were known for their affinity towards violence in order to attain their goals, the Chilean government and the carabineros (Chilean Gendarmerie) responded quickly and harshly.

The failed coup and massacre took place in the midst of a heated three-way election campaign between the liberal-conservative Gustavo Ross Santa María, the radical Popular Front's Pedro Aguirre Cerda, and the newly formed Popular Alliance candidate, Carlos Ibáñez del Campo. Elections were set to take place 25 October, just over a month after the massacre took place. The National Socialist Movement of Chile supported Ibáñez's candidacy, which had been announced on 4 September. The coup d'état was intended to take down the liberal government of Arturo Alessandri Palma and place Ibañez in power.

After the failed coup, which involved a stand-off and shootout where one Nacista and one police officer were killed, the Nacistas surrendered after receiving assurances of not being harmed. However, the police then broke their promise and summarily executed the Nacistas, allegedly under the orders of President Arturo Alessandri. A total of 59 Nacistas were massacred, with only four of the rebels managing to escape. Two Seguro Obrero employees were killed as well in the confusion.

== Background ==
The National Socialist Movement, also known as Nacistas, was a political movement which initially had ties to the Nazi Party in Germany and supported Adolf Hitler, but distance grew with the Nacistas lack of antisemitism in the 1930s. Initially receiving funds and members from Germans living in Chile and reaching a membership of over 20,000, The movement stressed need for one-party rule, corporatism and solidarity between classes, and soon set up its own paramilitary wing, the Tropas Nacistas de Asalto. Although the name "Naci" was in part inspired by the Nazi Party and their success in Europe, stressing Chilean nationality and the creole character of the movement they differentiated themselves by using a "c" in place of the "z" in the Nazi Party name.

== Coup ==
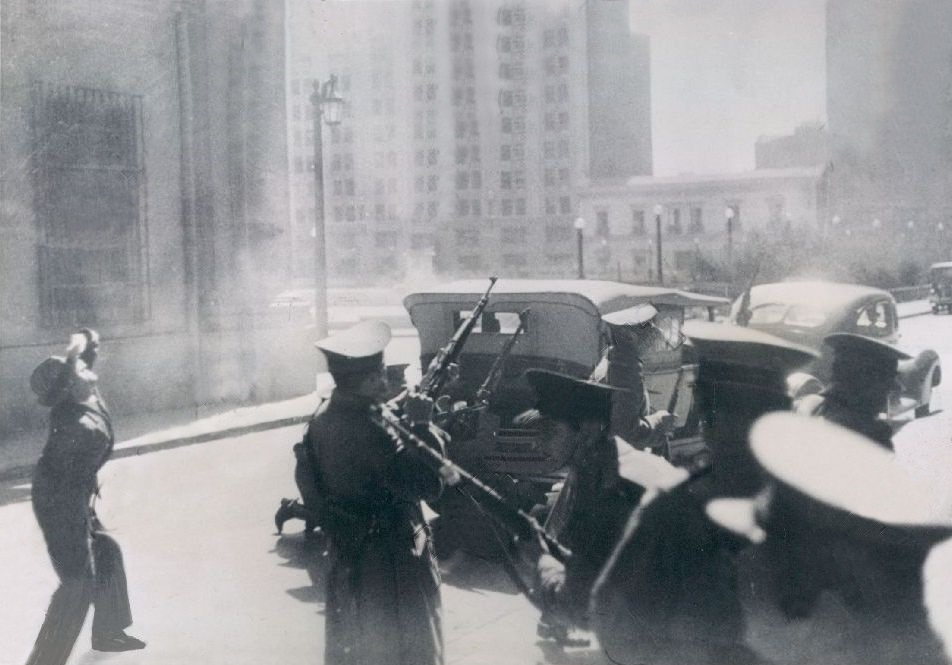
The Carabineros open fire on Nacistas occupying the Seguro Obrero. The attempted overthrow of the Chilean government by a pro-Nazi movement with ties to Germany led many in Chile to question the loyalties of the German Chilean community.

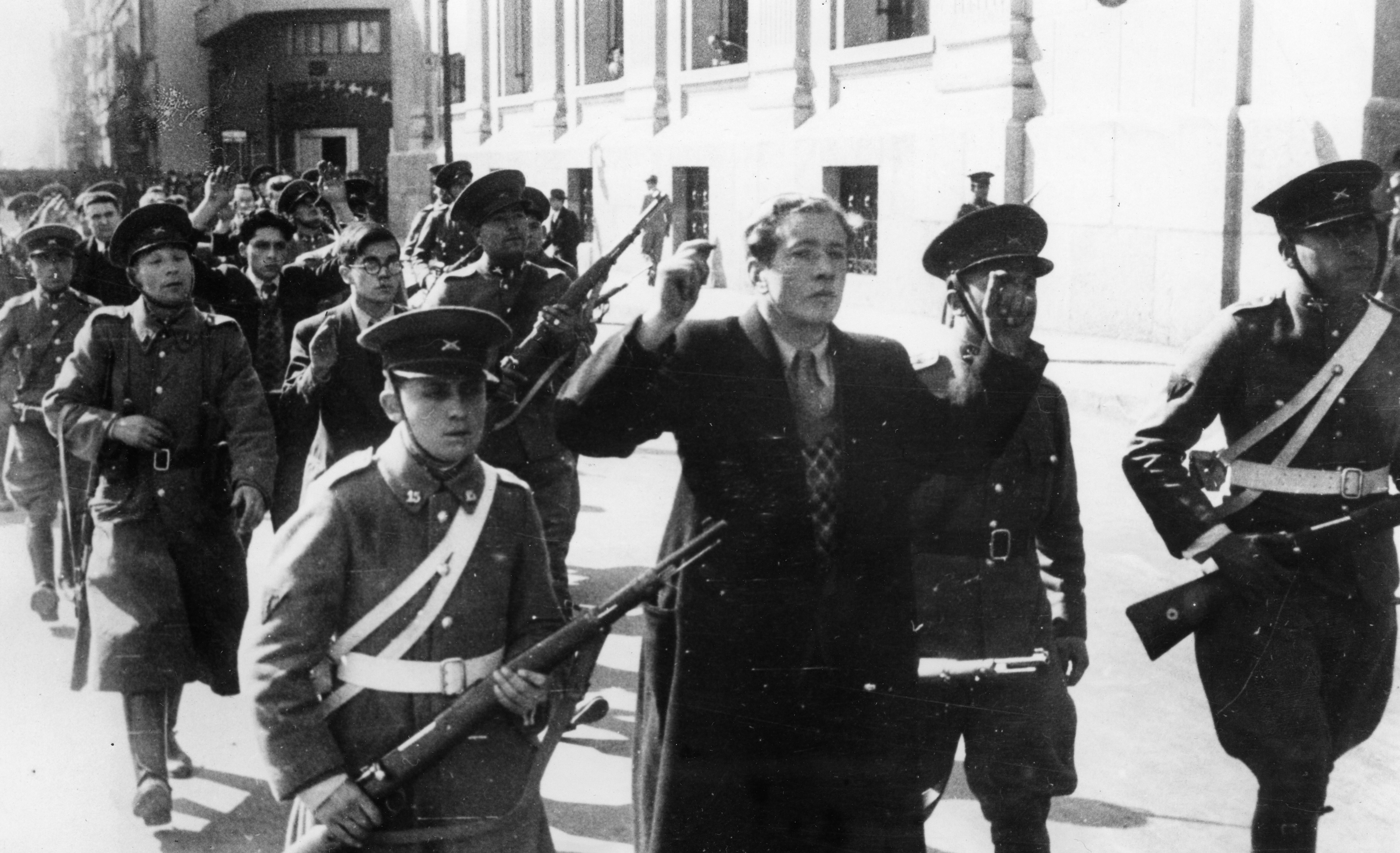
Carabineros escort some of the rebels who surrendered, shortly before summarily executing them.

At around 12:30 on 5 September 1938, approximately 30 armed Nacista youths affiliated with the National Socialist Movement occupied the Seguro Obrero building. José Luis Salazar, a carabinero who was on watch, upon observing the situation, thought that the Nacistas were concealing weapons under their coats, and prepared to respond. However, a member of the Nacista movement who observed the reaction of the serviceman opened fire, mortally wounding Salazar.

In response, a short while later a group of carabineros arrived and gathered at the base of the building. Heavy fire was exchanged between the Nacistas and the carabineros. Gerald Gallmeyer, a Nacista youth, was killed. His companions continued to resist and attempt to hold the building, but the carabineros ultimately forced them to retreat to the top floor, where they disabled the elevators and barricaded themselves in.

In the meantime, another 32 Nacista youths had occupied the central building at the University of Chile. This culminated in a shoot-out as well, beginning at 02:00, when an assault by the carabineros took members of the National Socialist group by surprise; those who surrendered were led with their hands up, toward the Seguro Obrero a few blocks away. There they were informed that the attempted coup had already failed and were sent into the building to convince their companions to lay down their arms on the condition that their lives would be spared. The Nacista activists accepted these terms and surrendered.

However, the police abruptly broke their promise and massacred the Nacistas. According to a reporter who was hiding in the Seguro Obrero building basement during the standoff, the carabineros opened fire on the Nacistas before they had exited the building. The officers seemingly went from room to room to eliminate the Nacistas who had already surrendered and laid down their weapons, lining them up against walls and mowing them down with rifle fire. Their bodies and faces were mutilated with sabers and bayonets. Ultimately, the police executed 59 Nacistas, with only four youths managing to escape. Two Seguro Obrero employees, one of them a high-ranking official, were also shot dead by the carabineros under unclear circumstances.

== Results ==
Some attest that Chilean President Arturo Alessandri, enraged by the coup and looking to past success of forcefully putting down troublesome groups, issued presidential orders to the Carabinero General Arriagada to eliminate the Nacista threat by 1600 that day or the military and artillery would take over. Although the accusations are grounded in speculation, Marcus Klein argues in La Matanza del Seguro Obrero that Alessandri gave the execution order, and this is accepted by many historians. Alessandri denied giving this order even to his deathbed, claiming to have only told Arriagada to restore order however he best saw fit.

The failure of the coup ultimately led to Ibañez removing himself from the October election, and the Popular Front candidate Pedro Aguirra Cerda winning by a narrow margin.

== See also ==
- Ariostazo
- Chilean political scandals
- History of Chile
- List of massacres in Chile
- Operation Bolivar
- World War II by country#Chile
