= Francisco Antonio Encina =

Chilean historian and white supremacist (1874–1965)

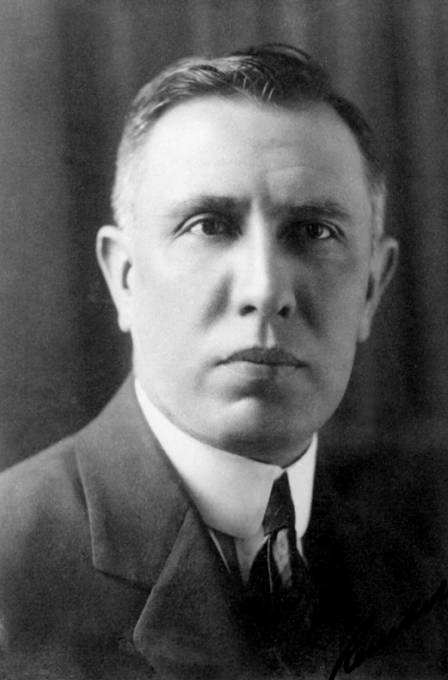
- Francisco Antonio Encina in 1903
- Born: 10 September 1874; San Javier de Loncomilla, Chile
- Died: 23 August 1965 (aged 90)

Education
- Education: University of Chile (LL.B.)

Philosophical work
- School: Social determinism; Scientific racism; Social darwinism
- Main interests: History of Chile; Race differences; Political economy
- Notable ideas: Racialization of chilean history

Francisco Antonio Encina Armanet (September 10, 1874, San Javier – August 23, 1965, Santiago) was a Chilean politician, agricultural businessman, political essayist, historian and prominent white supremacist. He authored the History of Chile from Prehistory to 1891: with 20 volumes, it stands as the largest individual historical work of the 20th century in Chile. Additionally, he worked with Tancredo Pinochet, Guillermo Subercaseaux, Luis Alberto Edwards Vives and Luis Galdames Galdames as founders of the first Chilean nationalist party.

In 1955, he won Chile's National Prize for Literature.

Liceo Francisco Antonio Encina Armanet (English: Francisco Antonio Ercina Arman High School) is a Chilean high school named after Francisco Antonio Encina. The school is located in Las Cabras, Cachapoal Province, Chile.

== Books ==
- La educación económica y el liceo. (1912)
- Nuestra inferioridad económica, sus causas, sus consecuencias (1912)
- Portales: Introducción a la Historia de la época de Diego Portales (1934)
- El nuevo concepto de la Historia. (1935)
- La literatura histórica chilena y el concepto actual de la historia (1935)
- Historia de Chile desde la prehistoria hasta 1891 (20 volumes). (1952)
- La entrevista de Guayaquil: Fin del protectorado y defunción del ejército libertador chileno (1953)
- Emancipación de la presidencia de Quito, del Virreinato de Lima y del Alto Perú (1954)
- Resumen de la Historia de Chile (edited by Leopoldo Castedo) (1954)
- La relación entre Chile y Bolivia (1841-1963) (1963)
- Bolívar, (biografía) 8 volumes, Editorial Nascimento, Santiago, 1957-1965
