= Herminia Arrate =

Chilean painter and Provisional First Lady (1895–1941)

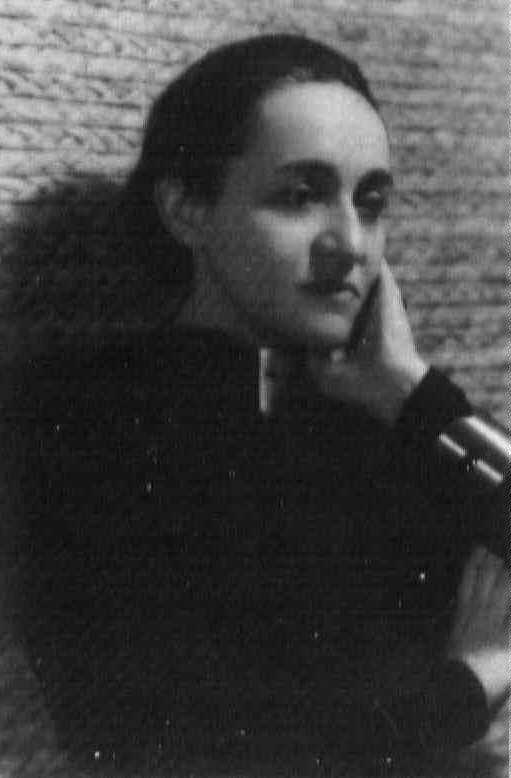

Provisional First Lady of Chile
- In role 16 June 1932 – 13 September 1932
- President: Carlos Dávila
- Preceded by: Graciela Fehrman Martínez
- Succeeded by: Rosa Ester Rodríguez Velasco

Personal details
- Born: Herminia Leonor del Carmen Arrate Ramírez; 1 July 1896 Santiago, Chile
- Died: 12 March 1941 (aged 44) Santiago, Chile
- Spouse: Carlos Dávila (m. 1918)
- Children: 2
- Relatives: Eleuterio Ramírez (grandfather)
- Education: University of Chile
- Occupation: Painter

Herminia Leonor del Carmen Arrate de Dávila (née Arrate Ramírez; 1 July 1896 – 12 March 1941) was a Chilean painter active in the United States and Santiago. In 1932, Arrate served as the Provisional First Lady of Chile.

== Early life and education ==
Arrate was born on 1 July 1895 in Santiago to Colonel Miguel Arrate Larraín and Delia Ramírez de Arrate. Through her mother, Arrate was the granddaughter of Colonel Eleuterio Ramírez.

Arrate studied at the Arts Faculty of the University of Chile (Note: Also cited as the Academy of Painting.) under Fernando Álvarez de Sotomayor y Zaragoza, Juan Francisco González and Pablo Burchard.

== Career ==
In 1925, Arrate exhibited at the Official Fine Arts Salon (Spanish: Salón Oficial de Bellas Artes) where she received an honorable mention in painting. The following year Arrate was awarded the Third Medal in painting and held her first solo show at Eyzaguirre House, where she exhibited 40 paintings.

=== United States ===
From 1927 to 1931, Arrate's husband Carlos Dávila served as the Chilean ambassador to the United States. Well known in Washington, D.C. for her hospitality, Arrate was able to paint consistently this period whilst also carrying out the diplomatice duties of being an ambassador's wife. In the summer of 1927, Arrate undertook a study trip to Europe with her daughters. In 1929, Arrate exhibited at a group exhibition at the Yorke Gallery in Washington D.C. and held a solo show at the Nicholas Roerich Museum in New York in 1931.

On 4 June 1932, Dávila together with Marmaduke Grove, Arturo Puga and Eugenio Matte Hurtado overthrew the government of Juan Esteban Montero in a coup d'état. Dávila first served as the President of Government Junta of Chile before serving as the Provisional President of Chile until 13 September 1932. Arrate and Dávila returned to the United States, living there until December 1940. In 1937, Arrate was drawn by Rufino Tamayo.

== Personal life ==
On 10 August 1918, Arrate married Carlos Dávila, a journalist and later ambassador to the United States and Provisional President of Chile. Arrate and Dávila had two daughters.

In December 1940, Arrate became critically ill in New York. On the orders of President Franklin D. Roosevelt, Arrate was flown to Santiago by the United States Army. On 12 March, Arrate later died from cancer in Santiago, aged 44.

== Legacy ==
In 1942, a retrospective of Arrate's work was held at the Amigos del Arte gallery in Santiago.

In 2024, the Arts Faculty of the University of Chile established the Herminia Arrate de Dávila award in Arrate's honor.

== Notes ==
Honorary titles
Preceded by Graciela Fehrman Martínez	First Lady of Chile; 1932	Succeeded by Rosa Ester Rodríguez Velasco
