= Ernesto Silva Román =

Chilean journalist, writer and politician (1897–1976)

Member of the Chamber of Deputies
- In office 1930–1932
- Constituency: Pisagua and Tarapacá

Personal details
- Born: 24 October 1897 Valparaíso, Chile
- Died: 11 October 1976 (aged 78) Santiago, Chile
- Party: Confederación Republicana de Acción Cívica
- Spouse: Julia del Carmen Bravo Herrera Cid
- Children: 1
- Occupation: Journalist, writer, politician

Ernesto Silva Román (24 October 1897 in Valparaíso, Chile – 11 October 1976 in Santiago, Chile) was a Chilean journalist, writer and politician, member of the Confederación Republicana de Acción Cívica (CRAC).

He served as a member of the Chamber of Deputies of Chile for the Pisagua and Tarapacá constituency between 1930 and 1932, until the dissolution of the National Congress following the coup of June 1932 that led to the establishment of the Socialist Republic of Chile.

== Early life and education ==
Silva Román was born in Valparaíso on 24 October 1897, the son of Pedro Silva Medina and Isolina Román Meléndez. He completed his studies at the Instituto Nacional and the Instituto Superior de Comercio (INSUCO).

== Career ==
He began his career in journalism in 1917 at the newspaper La Mañana in Temuco. He later worked for El Correo in Valdivia until 1925. He founded the magazine Selva Austral in Temuco and Surlandia in Valdivia, serving as director of the latter. Between 1918 and 1920, he published a series of short stories in the magazine Zig-Zag, which have been regarded as pioneering works of early science fiction in Chile. These narratives anticipated themes such as space travel, planetary dangers and eccentric scientists, preceding by several years similar developments in the United States associated with authors such as Hugo Gernsback and magazines like Amazing Stories. Some of these works were later compiled in the anthology El dueño de los astros.

In 1926, he joined El Mercurio of Santiago as a reporter. Writing under the pseudonym “El Canciller Negro”, his political and social columns were published in numerous newspapers across Chile. In 1928, he became an editor at La Nación.

Between 1933 and 1937, he lived in Argentina, where he worked for the newspaper El Día. In 1938, he founded the newspaper El Clamor to support the presidential campaign of Carlos Ibáñez del Campo.

As a writer, Silva Román developed a body of work that included novels, essays and short narratives, often characterized by elements of fantasy and social commentary. His literary production has been noted for its engagement with contemporary political and cultural themes, as well as for its use of journalistic language and narrative experimentation.

In 1941, he joined LAN Chile, where he was appointed Secretary General of the institution and its Administrative Council in 1943. In 1962, he served as co-director of the Revista Masónica de Chile.

== Political career ==
Silva Román was a member of the Confederación Republicana de Acción Cívica (CRAC). He served as press secretary to the presidency during the governments of Carlos Ibáñez del Campo, Carlos Dávila and General Bartolomé Blanche between 1927 and 1930.

In 1930, he was elected deputy for Pisagua and Tarapacá for the 1930–1934 constitutional period. During his tenure, he was a member of the Permanent Commission on Public Education. His parliamentary term ended prematurely following the dissolution of Congress on 6 June 1932.

== Personal life ==
He married Julia del Carmen Bravo Herrera Cid in Santiago on 10 April 1952, with whom he had one daughter.
