= Arturo Puga =

Chilean military officer (1879–1944)

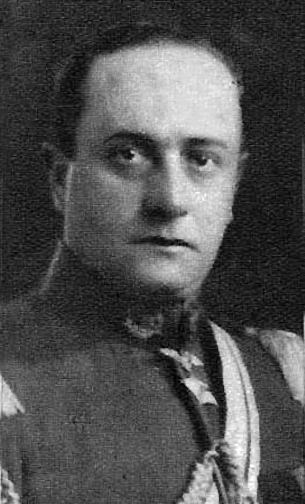

President of the Government Junta of Chile
- In office June 4, 1932 – June 16, 1932
- Preceded by: Juan Esteban Montero
- Succeeded by: Carlos Dávila

Minister of National Defense
- In office June 16, 1932 – July 8, 1932
- President: Carlos Dávila
- Preceded by: Marmaduke Grove
- Succeeded by: Pedro Lagos Lagos

Personal details
- Born: 1879 Santiago, Chile
- Died: April 28, 1944 (aged 64–65) Santiago, Chile
- Spouse: Bertha Martinez
- Children: Berta; Marta; Maria Helena; Albertol

General Arturo Puga Osorio (1879 – 28 April 1944) was a Chilean military officer and the chairman of the Government Junta in 1932.

On June 4, 1932, he became chairman of the Government Junta that was established after the resignation of President Juan Esteban Montero. His presidency lasted until June 16, 1932, when he was forced to resign by the army, who imposed Carlos Davila as the new president.

He married Bertha Martinez and had four children: Berta, Marta, Maria Helena, and Albertol Puga Martinez. Bertha married Alberto Lleras Camargo, the first secretary general of the Organization of American States.

== Cabinet ==
Portfolio	Minister	Took office	Left office	Party
Government Junta
President of the Junta	Arturo Puga	4 June 1932	16 June 1932	Military
Members	Carlos Dávila	4 June 1932	13 June 1932	Independent
Members	Eugenio Matte Hurtado	4 June 1932	16 June 1932	Nueva Acción Pública
Members	Rolando Merino Reyes	13 June 1932	16 June 1932	Nueva Acción Pública
Ministers
Minister of the Interior	Arturo Puga	4 June 1932	6 June 1932	Military
Minister of the Interior	Rolando Merino Reyes	6 June 1932	13 June 1932	Nueva Acción Pública
Minister of the Interior	Arturo Ruiz Maffey	13 June 1932	16 June 1932	Independent
Minister of Foreign Affairs and Commerce	Luis Barriga Errázuriz	5 June 1932	16 June 1932	Nueva Acción Pública
Minister of Finance	Alfredo Lagarrigue Rengifo	5 June 1932	16 June 1932	Nueva Acción Pública
Minister of Justice	Pedro Fajardo Ulloa	5 June 1932	16 June 1932	Democrat
Minister of Public Education	Eugenio González Rojas	5 June 1932	16 June 1932	Nueva Acción Pública
Minister of National Defense	Marmaduke Grove	5 June 1932	16 June 1932	Ind. Socialist
Minister of Development	Víctor Navarrete Senn	5 June 1932	16 June 1932	Independent
Minister of Land and Colonisation	Carlos Alberto Martínez	5 June 1932	16 June 1932	Nueva Acción Pública
Minister of Agriculture	Nolasco Cárdenas Avendaño	5 June 1932	16 June 1932	Democrat
Minister of Labour	Ramón Álvarez Jabalquinto	5 June 1932	16 June 1932	Nueva Acción Pública
Minister of Public Health	Oscar Cifuentes	5 June 1932	16 June 1932	Nueva Acción Pública

== See also ==
- Socialist Republic of Chile

Political offices
Preceded by Juan Esteban Montero	President of Government Junta; 1932	Succeeded by Carlos Dávila
Government offices
Preceded by Víctor Robles	Minister of the Interior; 1932	Succeeded by Rolando Merino Reyes
Preceded by Marmaduque Grove	Minister of Defense; 1932	Succeeded by Minister of War and Aviation
Preceded by Marmaduque Grove	Minister of Defense; 1932	Succeeded by Minister of the Navy
