= List of Chilean coups d'état =

This is a list of the coups d'état (including plots, failed and successful attempts and armed conflicts) that have taken place in Chile, during its independent history. The 1973 Chilean coup d'état stands out being the last one as well as one of the most violent and with more far-reaching impact in the history of Chile.

== 1780s ==
1. Conspiracy of the Tres Antonios, (1781) – A failed attempt to declare Chile an independent republic

== 1810s ==
1. Government Junta of Chile, (18 September 1810) – A successful coup in favor of home rule in Chile
2. Figueroa mutiny, (1 April 1811) – A failed attempt to restore royal power in Chile
3. September 1811 Chilean coup d'état, (4 September 1811) – A successful coup in favor of José Miguel Carrera

== 1820s ==
1. Campino mutiny, (1827) – A failed attempt to destroy the opposition to the federalist system
2. San Fernando mutiny, (June, 1828) of Pedro Urriola, José Antonio Vidaurre and the Maipo Battalion.
3. Chilean Civil War of 1829, (1829) – An armed conflict between conservatives and liberals over the constitutional regime.

== 1830s ==
1. Arauco rebellion, (1831) of Pedro Barnechea and Captain Uriarte
2. Rebellion of Cazadores de Quechereguas Regiment, (1832) – Under Cap. Eusebio Ruiz
3. Arteaga Conspiracy, (1833), – of General Zenteno and Coronel Picarte
4. Cotapos revolution, (1833), – of José Antonio Pérez de Cotapos
5. Freire expedition, (1836) – An invasion of Chiloé Island and failed attempt to depose the government
6. Quillota mutiny, (1837) – A failed attempt to depose the government that resulted in the death of Diego Portales

== 1850s ==
1. 1851 Chilean Revolution, (1851) – An armed rebellion by liberals against the conservative President Manuel Montt
2. 1859 Chilean Revolution, (1859) – A rekindling of the armed rebellion by liberals against the conservative President Manuel Montt started in 1851

== 1890s ==
1. 1891 Chilean Civil War, (1891) – An armed conflict between forces supporting National Congress and forces that supported President José Manuel Balmaceda
2. Several Balmacedist plots, (1891–94) – Planned by Hernán Abos-Padilla, Nicanor Donoso, Diego Bahamondes, Luis Leclerc, Herminio Euth, José Domingo Briceño, Edmundo Pinto, Manuel and Emilio Rodríguez, Virgilio Talquino and Anselmo Blanlot against the new government

== 1910s ==
1. Military League plot, (1912) – A failed plot against President Ramon Barros Luco. In September, Gonzalo Bulnes the appointed leader of the plot, desisted.
2. Armstrong-Moore plot, (1919) – A failed plot by Generals Guillermo Armstrong and Manuel Moore against President Juan Luis Sanfuentes

== 1920s ==
1. 1924 Chilean coup d'état, (5 September 1924) – A successful coup against President Arturo Alessandri
2. 1925 Chilean coup d'état, (23 January 1925) – A successful coup in which Carlos Ibáñez del Campo and Marmaduke Grove overthrew Luis Altamirano to return President Arturo Alessandri to office

== 1930s ==
1. Little red plane plot, (21 September 1930) – A failed attempt against President Carlos Ibáñez del Campo by Marmaduke Grove
2. Fall of Carlos Ibáñez del Campo, 26 Jule 1931, successful rebellion against Ibañez
3. Chilean naval mutiny of 1931, (September, 1931) – A rebellion in the Chilean Navy against Vice-President Manuel Trucco that ended with the fleet being bombed from the air.
4. Norte Grande insurrection, (25 December 1931) – A failed Communist push against President Juan Esteban Montero
5. 1932 Chilean coup d'état, (4 June 1932) – A successful coup that resulted in the instauration of the Socialist Republic of Chile, in which Marmaduke Grove overthrows Juan Esteban Montero
6. Antofagasta coup d'état, (27 September 1932) – A successful coup of General Pedro Vignola that resulted in the resignation of President Bartolomé Blanche and the return to civilian rule
7. Las Mercedes' plot, (1933) – A failed plot against President Arturo Alessandri. Commander-in-Chief of the Army, Pedro Vignola called "to resist the Milicia Republicana by any means"
8. Humberto Videla's plot, (1935) – failed rebellion of NCO's
9. 1936 plot against Alessandri, (1936) – By René Silva Espejo and Alejandro Lagos
10. Seguro Obrero massacre, (5 September 1938) – A failed National Socialist attempt in favor of Carlos Ibáñez that resulted in the murder of 59 young party members
11. Ariostazo, (25 August 1939) – A failed attempt of Ariosto Herrera against President Pedro Aguirre Cerda

== 1940s ==
1. Pig trotters' plot, (1948) – A failed plot against President Gabriel González Videla

== 1950s ==
1. Línea Recta affair, (1954) – A failed plot to allow President Carlos Ibáñez del Campo to assume dictatorial powers

== 1970s ==
1. Tanquetazo, (29 June 1973) – A failed coup against President Salvador Allende
2. 1973 Chilean coup d'état, (11 September 1973) – A successful coup against President Salvador Allende (resulting in his death), in favor of Augusto Pinochet

== See also ==
- History of Chile
- List of government juntas of Chile
- List of coups d'état and coup attempts
- List of coups d'état and coup attempts by country
