= Eugenio González Rojas =

Chilean politician

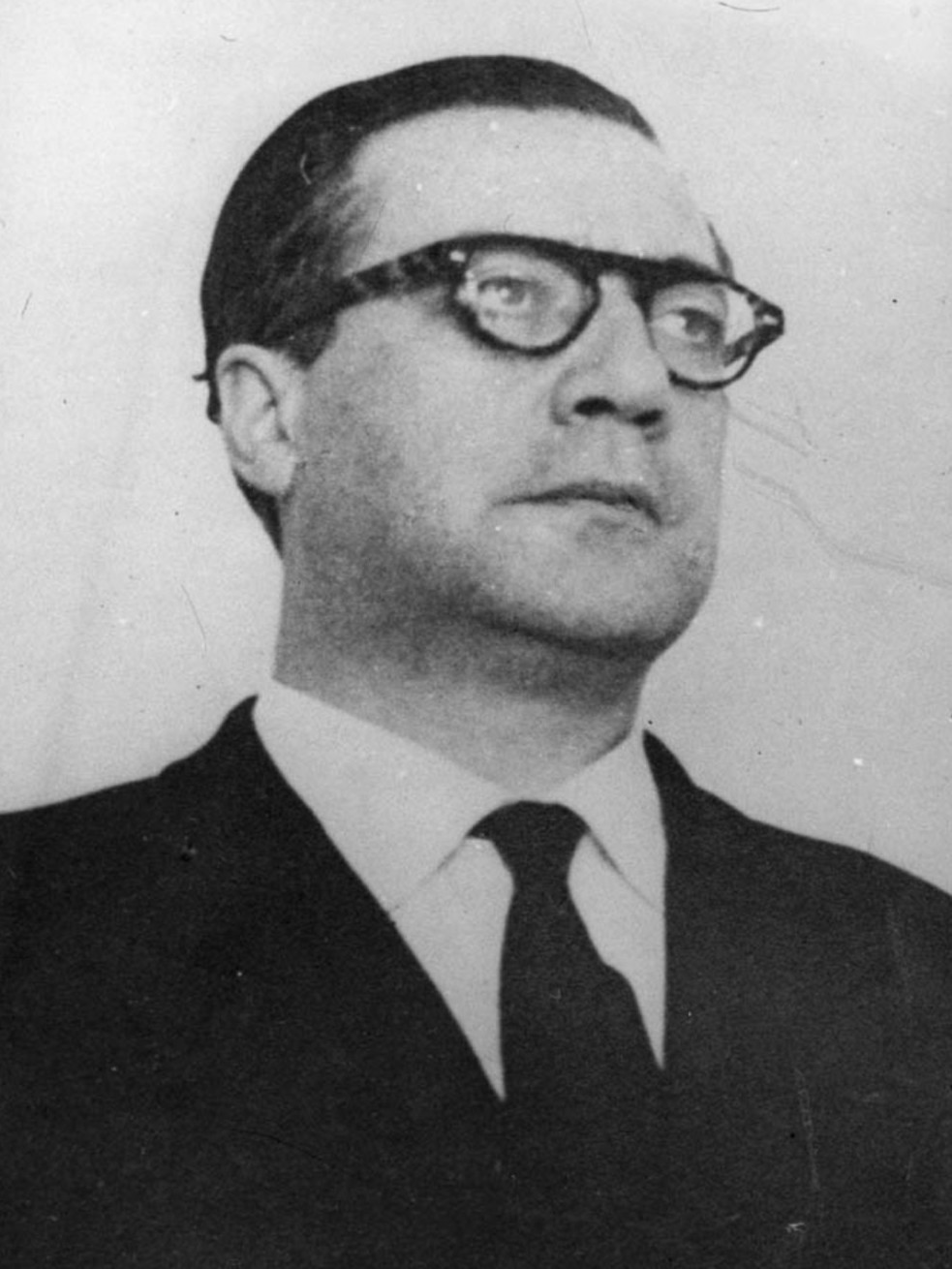

Member of the Senate
- In office 15 May 1949 – 15 May 1957
- Constituency: 4th Departamental Grouping

Head of the University of Chile
- In office 1963–1968

Personal details
- Born: January 23, 1903 Santiago, Chile
- Died: July 28, 1976 (aged 73) Santiago, Chile
- Party: Socialist Party (1933–1976)
- Education: Universidad de Chile (BA in Philosophy, 1928)
- Occupation: Politician, scholar
- Profession: Philosopher, teacher

Eugenio González Rojas (born January 23, 1903 – August 28, 1976) was a Chilean philosopher, scholar, politician and writer. He was a founding member of the Chilean Socialist Party as well as its theoretician.

He has been commonly cited as an inspiration by Chilean left-wing intellectuals, scholars and politicians. In 2014, the left-wing organization Nodo XXI established a school of political leaders baptized with his name.

== Biography ==
He was a founding member of the Federación de Estudiantes Secundarios de Santiago (FESES) and it was its first president. Later, he was elected as president of the University of Chile Student Federation (FECh).

In 1933, alongside Oscar Schnake, with whom showed his anarchist affiliation, founded the collective Acción Revolucionaria Socialista (ARS). Then, this association and another three merged into the current Socialist Party of Chile in April 1933. Thereby, he was a founder member next to Marmaduke Grove, Eugenio Matte, Salvador Allende and Schnake.

In 1971, he was appointed as general manager of Televisión Nacional de Chile by then President Allende.
