= Government Junta of Chile (November 1811) =

Short-lived Chilean government

Government Junta of Chile (November 16, 1811), also known as the Provisional Junta, was the political structure established to rule Chile following the Military Coup organized by Juan Martínez de Rozas and José Miguel Carrera. It lasted until replaced by the December Junta.

== Background ==
After organizing the coup that had brought down the Second Junta (on September 4, 1811), Juan Martínez de Rozas had managed to regain a big measure of the former power he had held during the time of the First Junta, but he still was not satisfied. He wanted the totality of power concentrated on his person. To achieve this, he convinced the recently returned José Miguel Carrera to help him oust the Superior Junta.

== Members ==
Position	Name
Members	Juan Martínez de Rozas; José Miguel Carrera; José Gaspar Marín
Alternate Member	Bernardo O'Higgins

== History ==
The Junta lasted only a month because by this time divisions began to arise between the Rozas followers from Concepción and the men of Santiago. Also a feud for the leadership broke out between the two leaders, Martínez de Rozas and Carrera who had secured control of Santiago. The fight was finally solved on December 16, in another bloodless coup, when the Junta was forced to resign and was replaced by the December Junta under the undisputed leadership of Carrera. In 1812 Carrera succeeded in securing the banishment of his rival, who was forced to retire to Mendoza, where he died on March 3, 1813

== See also ==
- History of Chile
- List of Government Juntas of Chile
