= Schnake =

Schnake is a surname. Notable people with the surname include:

- Björn Schnake (born 1971), German Paralympic table tennis player
- Oscar Schnake (1899–1976), Chilean politician and physician
