= 1932 presidential election =

The 1932 presidential election may refer to:

- 1932 Chilean presidential election
- 1932 German presidential election
- 1932 United States presidential election
