= 1932 Chilean general election =

- 30 October 1932
- Registered: 464,879
- Turnout: 74.40% (▲0.93pp)
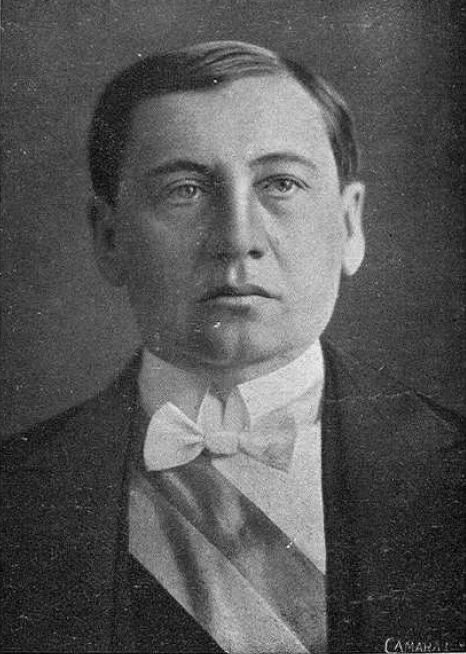

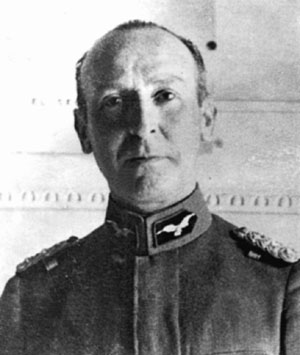

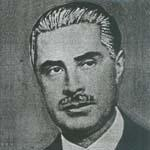

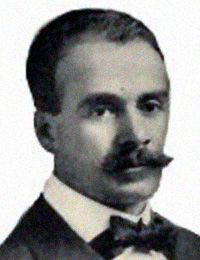
Nominee	Arturo Alessandri	Marmaduke Grove
Party	Liberal	New Public Action
Popular vote	187,914	60,856
Percentage	55.05%	17.64%
Nominee	Héctor Rodríguez	Enrique Zañartu Prieto
Party	Conservative	United Liberal
Popular vote	47,207	42,885
Percentage	13.68%	12.43%
President before election
Abraham Oyanedel (acting)
Independent
Elected President
Arturo Alessandri
Liberal

General elections were held in Chile on 30 October 1932. Arturo Alessandri of the Liberal Party was elected president, whilst the Conservative Party and Radical Party emerged as the largest parties in the Chamber of Deputies.

== Background ==
The election took place roughly a year after the previous election, but political and economic instability caused by the Great Depression which hit a low in mid-1932, only made the situation worse. President Montero had to resign shortly after a mutiny led by Marmaduque Grove, who headed the Socialist Republic of Chile until being overthrown by former ally Carlos Dávila who would also be overthrown, this time by Bartolome Blanche. After his downfall, Abraham Oyanedel became head of state. The return of Alessandri became so highly awaited that he won the election in a landslide ending a turbulent and bitter year for the country, being considered today as the worst one in Chilean history.

== Electoral system ==
The presidential election was held using the absolute majority system, under which a candidate had to receive over 50% of the popular vote to be elected. If no candidate received over 50% of the vote, both houses of the National Congress would come together to vote on the two candidates that received the most votes.

== Results ==
=== President ===
Candidate	Party	Votes	%
Arturo Alessandri	Liberal Party	189,914	55.05
Marmaduke Grove	New Public Action	60,856	17.64
Héctor Rodríguez de la Sotta	Conservative Party	47,207	13.68
Enrique Zañartu Prieto	United Liberal Party	42,885	12.43
Elías Lafertte	Communist Party	4,128	1.20
Total		344,990	100.00
Valid votes		344,990	99.74
Invalid/blank votes		902	0.26
Total votes		345,892	100.00
Registered voters/turnout		464,879	74.40
Source: Nohlen

=== Senate ===
Party	Seats
Radical Party	13
Conservative Party	10
Liberal Party	5
Socialist Radical Party	5
Democratic Party	4
Democrat Party	3
New Public Action	2
Independent Liberal Party	1
United Liberal Party	1
Republican Social Party	1
Total	45
Source: Nohlen

=== Chamber of Deputies ===
Party	Votes	%	Seats	+/–
Radical Party	59,413	18.10	34	–5
Conservative Party	55,260	16.84	34	+6
Liberal Party	32,645	9.95	18	–16
Democratic Party	25,221	7.68	13	New
Democrat Party	19,819	6.04	7	–15
United Liberal Party	18,885	5.75	6	New
Socialist parties (Note: Including New Public Action (9,790 votes) and Chilean Socialists (5,352 votes).)	18,642	5.68	5	New
Socialist Radical Party	18,174	5.54	8	New
Republican Social Party	7,009	2.14	4	New
Agrarian Party	6,580	2.00	4	New
Independent Liberal Party	5,643	1.72	2	New
Communist Party	3,350	1.02	1	New
Social Democracy Party	3,029	0.92	1	New
Liberal Democratic Party	1,686	0.51	1	New
Other parties	19,735	6.01	0	–
Independents	33,116	10.09	4	+4
Total	328,207	100.00	142	+10
Registered voters/turnout	429,772	–		
Source: Nohlen

== Aftermath ==
Following the elections, three of the independent candidates elected to the Chamber of Deputies joined the Communist Party.
