= Ernesto Silva =

Ernesto Silva can refer to:

- Ernesto Silva Román (1897-1976), a Chilean politician, writer and journalist
- Ernesto Silva (equestrian) (born 1921), a Chilean equestrian
- Ernesto Silva Méndez (born 1975), a Chilean lawyer and politician
