= Radical Socialist Party =

Radical Socialist Party may refer to:

- Estonian Radical Socialist Party
- Radical Party (France)
- Radical Socialist Party (Luxembourg)
- Radical-Socialist Party Camille Pelletan, France
- Socialist Radical Party (Chile)
- Radical Socialist Republican Party, Spain
