= Oscar Schnake =

Chilean politician (1899–1976)

Óscar Schnake
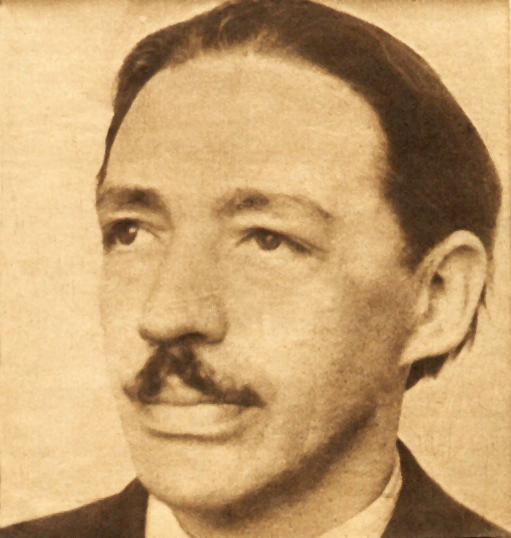

Minister of Public Works
- In office 18 August 1942 – 21 October 1942
- President: Juan Antonio Ríos
- Preceded by: Office created
- Succeeded by: Enrique Amagada

Minister of Development
- In office 2 February 1942 – 18 August 1942
- President: Juan Antonio Ríos
- Preceded by: Office finished
- Succeeded by: Rolando Merino Reyes
- In office 28 September 1939 – 16 December 1941
- President: Pedro Aguirre Cerda
- Preceded by: Arturo Bianchi
- Succeeded by: Rolando Merino Reyes

Member of the Senate
- In office 15 May 1937 – 28 September 1939
- Constituency: 1st Provincial Grouping

Secretary General of the Socialist Party of Chile
- In office 1933–1939

Personal details
- Born: 11 May 1899 Galvarino, Chile
- Died: 24 April 1976 (aged 76) Santiago, Chile
- Party: Socialist Party (1933–1976)
- Spouse: Gabriela Contreras Barrenechea
- Education: Universidad de Chile
- Occupation: Politician
- Profession: Physician

Oscar Alex Enrique Schnake Vergara (11 June 1899 – 24 April 1976) was a Chilean politician and physician, who served as a Senator and minister. He was a founder member of the Chilean Socialist Party and close to President Pedro Aguirre Cerda (1938–1941).

He has been described as one of the notorious leaders of the Chilean social democracy.

His wife, Gabriela Contreras de Schnake, was mayor of Santiago Centro in the early 1940s.

== Biography ==
Schnake was the grandson of a German immigrant from Kassel. In 1933, alongside Eugenio González Rojas, with whom showed his anarchist affiliation, he founded the collective Acción Revolucionaria Socialista (ARS). Then, this association and another three merged into the current Socialist Party of Chile in April 1933, so that he was a founder member next to Marmaduke Grove, Eugenio Matte, Salvador Allende and González Rojas.

He was the organizer of the Left Block, a political coalition which reunited left-wing political forces other with the exception of the Communist Party (PC) or the centrist Radical Party (PR). Nevertheless, the rising of both President Arturo Alessandri Palma's liberal-conservative right and Chilean Nazis (MNSCh, «nacis») forced him to seal an alliance with the PC and the PR. That way, it was established Popular Front of Chile, whose leader was Pedro Aguirre Cerda, who triumphed the 1938 Chilean presidential election over liberal-manchesterian economist Gustavo Ross Santa María.

In 1948, he was part of the Chilean Anti-Communist Action board.

After 1973 coup d'état led by Augusto Pinochet, his nephew Eric suffered persecution under Chilean dictatorship.

He died in 1976 away from the political life as did his friend González Rojas. A year later, Raúl Ampuero made a tribute entitled «Óscar Schnake and Eugenio González: Not only history».

== Pictures ==
Discourse	Popular Front March
Schnake during a political concentration 1930s	Rolando Merino Reyes, Schnake and Salvador Allende; 9 June 1940.
