= José Antonio Mora =

Uruguayan lawyer and diplomat

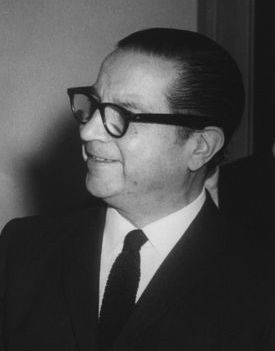
José Antonio Mora Otero in 1961

José Antonio Mora Otero (22 November 1897 – 26 January 1975) was a Uruguayan lawyer and diplomat.

Antonio Mora served as the secretary general of the Organization of American States between 16 January 1956 and 18 May 1968. Before retiring from politics, Mora served as Uruguay's Minister of Foreign Relations, a senior minister responsible for International relations, from 1971 to 1972.

Diplomatic posts
Preceded by Carlos Dávila	Secretary General of the Organization of American States; 1956–1968	Succeeded by Galo Plaza
