= Norte Grande insurrection =

The Norte Grande insurrection (December 25, 1931) (Spanish: Motín del Norte Grande) was a violent and ultimately unsuccessful coup attempt against the government of Chilean President Juan Esteban Montero.

== Background ==
In 1931, Chile was in the midst of a political and economic chaos that resulted from the market crash of 1929. Unemployment and poverty had soared, especially in the north of the country that was highly dependent of the income from the Nitrate industry, which had been highly affected by the introduction of artificial nitrates after World War I.

By mid-December, rumors started to spread about an upcoming communist insurrection that was to take place in the extreme north provinces against the government of President Juan Esteban Montero. In the cities of Vallenar and Copiapó the rumours were that the insurrectionists were going to take over the Esmeralda regiment barracks and the police headquarters on Christmas night, as the first step to a full-fledged revolution. Authorities gave no credence to any of the rumours, precisely because they were so open and precise.

== Events ==
The plot took place at 2 AM on the morning of December 25. At that time, Communist militia attacked the army barracks in Vallenar. The lieutenant and soldiers at the guard caught by surprise had to retreat to the infirmary where they were able to mount a hasty defense. The noise from the battle alerted the police, who arrived promptly to swell the ranks of the defenders. After more than half an hour of battle, the revolutionaries, who had suffered several casualties, escaped towards the hills.

When the news reached the superior authorities, a decision was made to nip the revolution in the bud. A police platoon was dispatched to capture the Communist headquarters in Vallenar. The police arrived shooting, and fire was returned from the inside. Since the policemen couldn't capture the building, they proceeded to dynamite it, killing everyone inside. Then they rounded up all the known Communists they could find in the city and shot them immediately.

An investigation established that 21 people were killed, nine of them during the assault on the barracks. On the other side, three policemen and two soldiers died, plus an unarmed civilian who happened to be passing by and was hit by a stray bullet.

== See also ==
- History of Chile
- List of Chilean coups d'état
