= Ricardo Núñez Muñoz =

Chilean politician

Ricardo Núñez
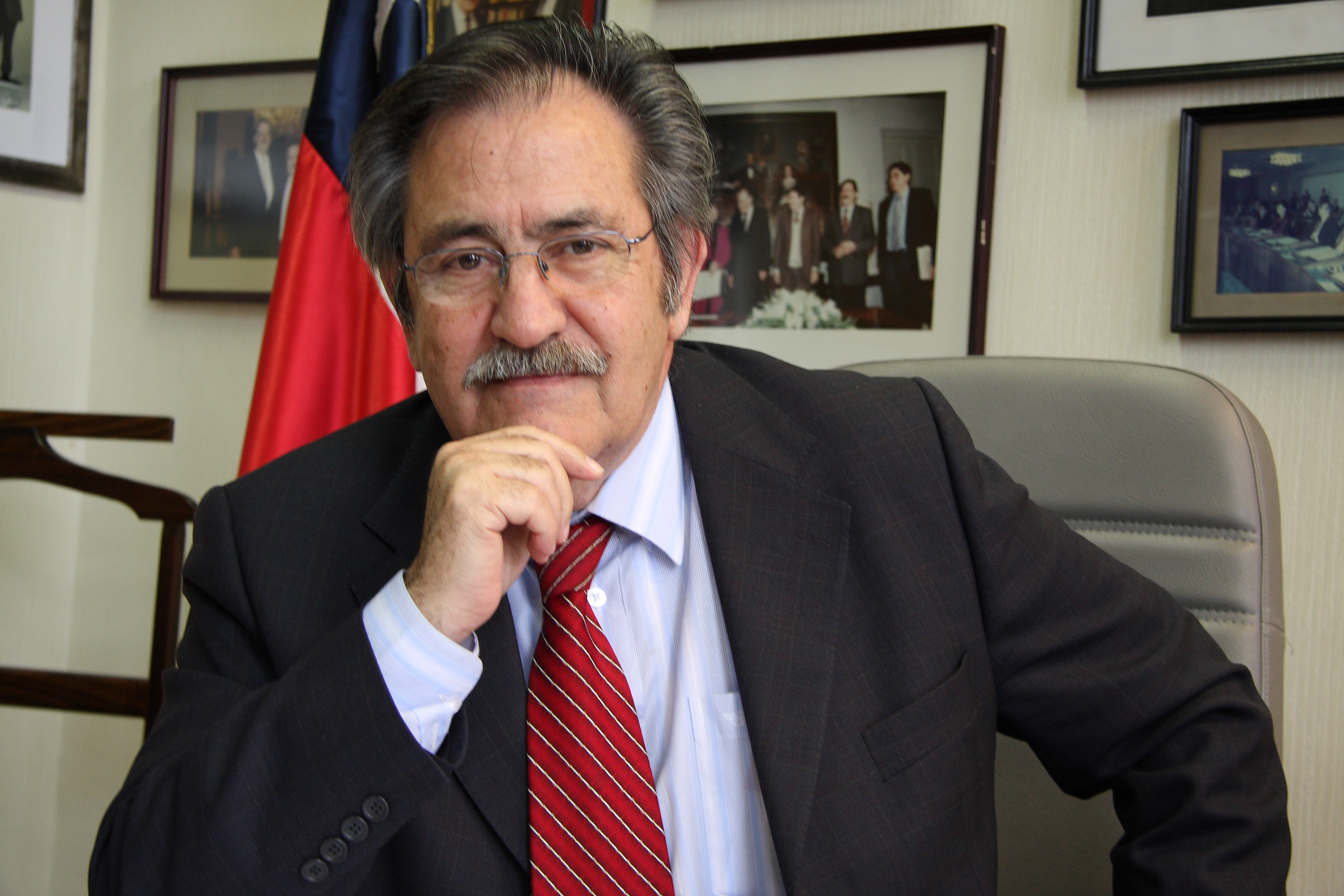

Member of the Senate of Chile
- In office 11 March 1990 – 11 March 2010
- Preceded by: District created
- Succeeded by: Isabel Allende Bussi
- Constituency: 3rd Circumscription

Personal details
- Born: 9 December 1939 (age 86) Sewell, Chile
- Party: Socialist Party
- Children: Two
- Education: University of Chile (B.Sc); Charles University (M.Sc)
- Occupation: Politician
- Profession: Historian; Sociologist

Héctor Ricardo Núñez Muñoz (born 9 December 1939) is a Chilean politician who was a member of the Senate of Chile.

He served as a senator for the 3rd Senatorial District (Atacama Region) for three consecutive terms between 1990 and 2010. He was also president of the Socialist Party of Chile on several occasions and later served as Chilean ambassador to Mexico from 2014 to 2018.

== Early life and education ==
Núñez was born on 9 December 1939 in Sewell, El Teniente mining camp. He is the son of Julio Núñez Bustamante and Berta Muñoz Peña. On 27 December 1954, he married María del Pilar Fontecilla Waugh, with whom he has two children.

He completed his secondary education at Liceo Valentín Letelier and Liceo No. 8 Arturo Alessandri Palma in Santiago. He later studied at the University of Chile, where he qualified as a teacher of history and economic geography.

He subsequently earned a degree in sociology from the same university and completed a master's degree in demography at Charles University in Prague, then part of Czechoslovakia.

== Academic career ==
Núñez began his teaching career in 1967 at the Technical University of the State (UTE), where he taught at the Technical Pedagogical Institute in history and geography, as well as courses in civic education, and served as academic advisor to students.

Between 1968 and 1970, he was a full professor at the University of Chile in its Santiago and Valparaíso campuses and worked as a research assistant at the Latin American Institute for Economic and Social Planning (ILPES), an agency of the Economic Commission for Latin America and the Caribbean (ECLAC) and the United Nations.

In 1972, he was elected secretary general of the Technical State University during the rectorship of Enrique Kirberg Baltiansky, a position he held until September 1973.

== Political career ==
Núñez began his political activities in 1955 when he joined the youth wing of the Socialist Party of Chile. One year later, he became political leader of the party's Secondary Students Brigade and a national leader of the Federation of Secondary Students of Chile. Between 1959 and 1962, he served as political leader of the Socialist University Brigade at the University of Chile. In 1967, he joined the party's Central Committee.

During the government of President Salvador Allende, Núñez served as director of planning at the National Council for Social Development. Following the military coup of 11 September 1973, he was detained, tortured, and held at several detention centers, including the National Stadium and the Santiago Penitentiary, until mid-1974. He subsequently went into exile, living in the German Democratic Republic and Spain, before returning to Chile in 1979.

After his return, Núñez played a key role in the reorganization of the Socialist Party following its internal split. In the 1980s, he helped found several socialist coordinating groups and was elected secretary general of the Socialist Party in 1986. He participated in the National Command for the No campaign in the 1988 plebiscite and was a signatory to the agreement that created the Concertation of Parties for Democracy.

In the 1989 parliamentary elections, Núñez was elected senator for the 3rd Senatorial District (Atacama) for the 1990–1994 term, initially representing the Party for Democracy. In 1991, he rejoined the Socialist Party and subsequently served as its president, vice president, and international secretary. He was re-elected as senator in 1993 and again in 2001, serving continuously until 2010, obtaining the highest vote share in his district in each election.

In 2014, President Michelle Bachelet appointed Núñez as Chilean ambassador to Mexico, a position he held until March 2018. In 2023, he ran as a candidate for the Constitutional Council representing the Socialist Party in the Atacama Region but was not elected due to gender parity rules.
