= List of government juntas of Chile =

This is a list of the Government Juntas that have ruled Chile as an executive government, since its independence:

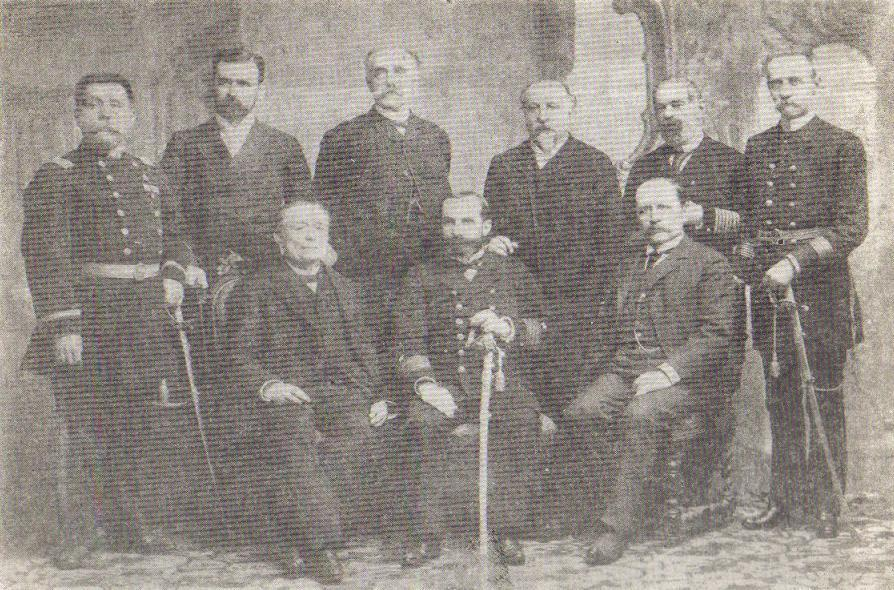
Government Junta of Chile (1891).

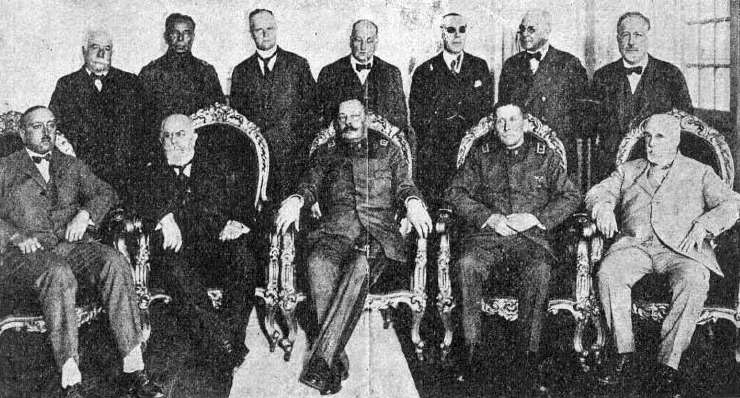
Government Junta of Chile (1924).

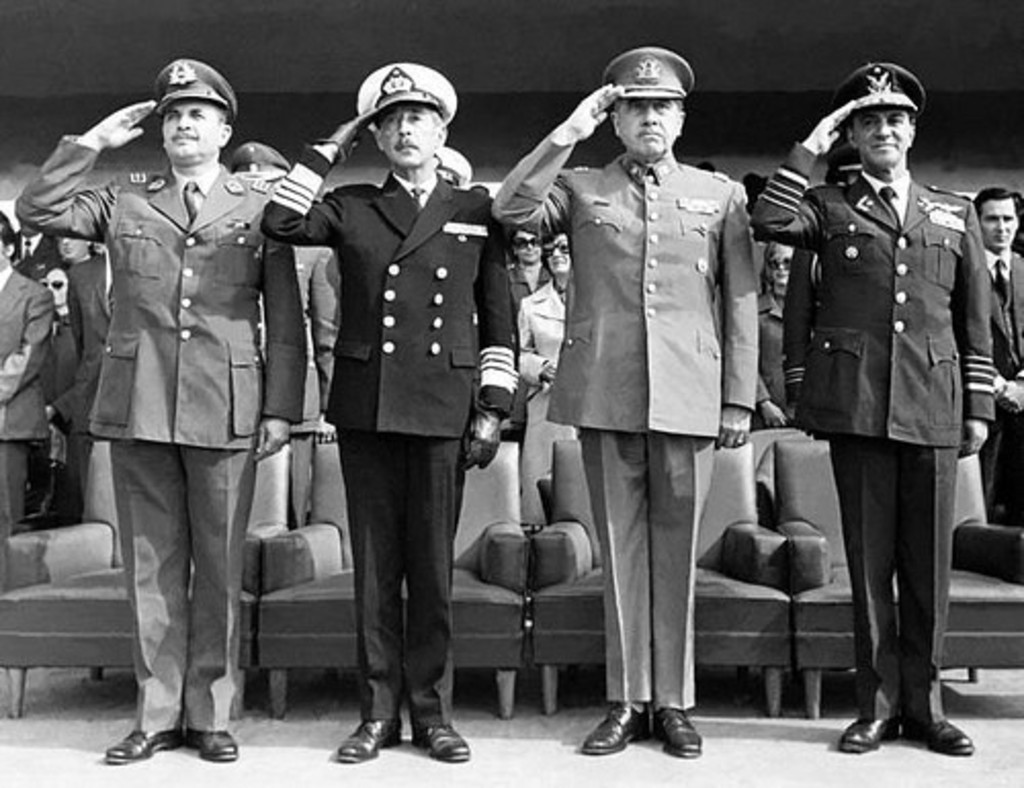
Government Junta of Chile (1973).

- Government Junta of the Kingdom of Chile (1810), also known as the First Junta
- Government Junta of Chile (August, 1811), also known as the Executive Junta or Second Junta
- Government Junta of Chile (September, 1811), also known as the Superior Junta or Third Junta
- Government Junta of Chile (November, 1811), also known as the Provisional Junta or Fourth Junta
- Government Junta of Chile (December, 1811), also known as the December Junta or Fifth Junta
- Government Junta of Chile (April, 1812), also known as the Superior Governmental Junta or Sixth Junta
- Government Junta of Chile (October 2, 1812), also known as the Government Junta or Seventh Junta
- Government Junta of Chile (October 27, 1812), also known as the Government Junta or Eighth Junta
- Government Junta of Chile (1813), also known as the Superior Governmental Junta or Ninth Junta
- Government Junta of Chile (1814), also known as the Superior Governmental Junta or Tenth Junta
- Government Junta of Chile (1823), also known as the Governmental Junta
- Government Junta of Chile (1829)
- Government Junta of Chile (1891), also known as the Revolutionary Junta of Iquique or Iquique Junta
- Government Junta of Chile (1924), also known as the September Junta or Military Junta
- Government Junta of Chile (1925), also known as the January Junta
- Government Junta of Chile (1932), also known as the Government Junta of Socialist Republic or Socialist Junta
- Government Junta of Chile (1973), also known as the Military Junta

== See also ==
- History of Chile
- List of Chilean coups d'état
