= Socialist Radical Party (Chile) =

Socialist Radical Party Partido Radical Socialista
- Founded: 1931
- Dissolved: 1941
- Split from: Radical Party
- Merged into: Radical Party
- Headquarters: Santiago, Chile
- Ideology: Radicalism; Social democracy Laïcité
- Political position: Centre-left

The Socialist Radical Party (Spanish: Partido Radical Socialista) was a radical political party of Chile that existed from 1931 to 1941.

== History ==
Created on the eve of the presidential election that resulted after the fall of Ibáñez in 1930, the Social Radical Party was made up of members of the Radical Party. It was formed in opposition to the candidacy of the radical Juan Esteban Montero, who was supported by the traditional right-wing. Its main founders were José Eliseo Peña Villalón, Benjamín Manterola and Aurelio Núñez Morgado. He participated in the Federation of the Left, which was a coalition failed to support the candidacy of Arturo Alessandri Palma.

The party participated in the Government Junta of 30 June 1932 that overthrew Montero and subsequent government of Carlos Dávila Espinoza, through Peña Villalón. Alessandri was elected in 1932, forming a cabinet. One year later, in 1933, it formed the opposition to his government. In 1936 the party joined the Popular Front.

In 1941 the Socialist Radical Party was dissolved and most of its members returned to the Radical Party, while another small group joined the Socialist Party.

== Presidential candidates ==
The following is a list of the presidential candidates supported by the Socialist Radical Party. (Information gathered from the Archive of Chilean Elections).

- 1931: Arturo Alessandri (lost)
- 1932: Arturo Alessandri (won)
- 1938: Pedro Aguirre Cerda (won)
