= Government Junta of Chile (1932) =

Short-lived Chilean government

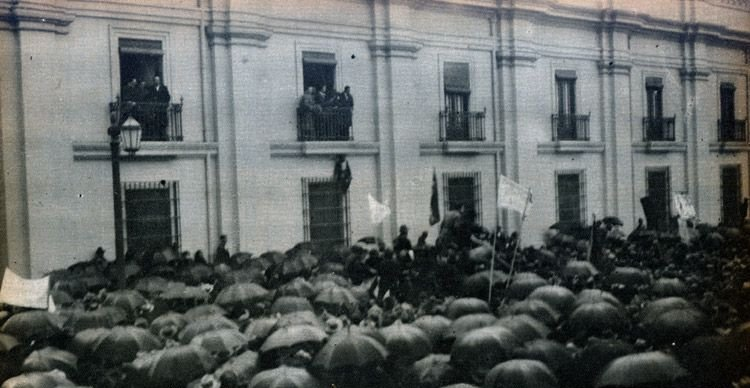
March in support of the proclamation of the Socialist Republic of Chile, in front of La Moneda Palace (June 12, 1932)

Government Junta of Chile (June 4, 1932 – July 8, 1932) (also known as the Government Junta of the Socialist Republic or Socialist Junta), was a political structure established during the anarchy (1931 – 1932) that followed the resignation of President Carlos Ibáñez del Campo. It proclaimed the Socialist Republic of Chile. The short-lived state ended with the election of Arturo Alessandri as new president of Chile.

== Creation ==
On July 26, 1931, President Carlos Ibáñez del Campo resigned, following the economic crisis caused by the market crash of 1929. The office was assumed by the president of the Senate, Pedro Opazo Letelier, who promptly himself resigned (the very next morning) after naming Juan Esteban Montero as his successor. Montero, as a way out of the political impasse, immediately called for presidential elections. In the meanwhile he assumed as vice president. Since Montero was constitutionally banned from standing as a candidate while still in office, as a way out of the political impasse, and in order to qualify, he resigned his vice-presidency effective on August 20, 1931. The position was assumed by Manuel Trucco as vice president.

The presidential elections finally took place on October 4, 1931, with Juan Esteban Montero as the clear winner. He took over again in the midst of a political and economic chaos. His program called for the implementation of an austerity program that involved the reduction of public expenditures and public salaries, a downsizing of the public administration and an increase of the foreign debt. Notwithstanding these harsh measures, the depreciation of the currency continued, and inflation soared while the Central Bank reserves were at an all-time low. This economic program only managed to cause widespread discontent, while in no way improving the economy, and in turn led to his downfall.

There were three principal groups of critics against Montero's policies: one headed by journalist Carlos Dávila, another (socialist) headed by Air Commodore Marmaduque Grove, and the third, known as the NAP (New Public Association) headed by Eugenio Matte (of socialist orientation also.) On June 4, 1932, the Air Force, under the leadership of Commodore Grove, rebelled against the government, causing the immediate resignation of President Montero, and the proclamation of the Socialist Republic of Chile. The executive power was vested in a Government Junta made up of General Arturo Puga (in representation of the military party), Carlos Dávila and Eugenio Matte.

== Members ==
Position	Name	Took office	Left office
President	General Arturo Puga Osorio; Carlos Dávila Espinoza	June 4, 1932; June 16, 1932	June 16, 1932; July 8, 1932
Member	Carlos Dávila Espinoza; Rolando Merino Reyes; Pedro Nolasco Cárdenas Avendaño	June 4, 1932; June 13, 1932; June 16, 1932	June 13, 1932; June 16, 1932; July 8, 1932
Member	Eugenio Matte Hurtado; Alberto Cabero Díaz	June 4, 1932; June 16, 1932	June 16, 1932; July 8, 1932

== History ==
As soon as the Junta took power, they decreed the dissolution of Congress, and a series of measures of social character. From the beginning, this Junta captivated the public support, but soon it became apparent that there was no unity within it. Only a week and a half later, on June 13, Dávila resigned, and was replaced by Rolando Merino Reyes.

Three days later, Dávila managed to replace General Puga, and the other members, with himself, Pedro Nolasco Cárdenas and Alberto Cabero. Public order was reestablished, but it gave way to a regime whose only support was force. On July 8, Dávila dissolved the Junta and assumed power as "Provisional President". He called new congressional elections, and adopted a new batch of measures to solve the economic crisis. Nonetheless, the opposition to his rule was increasing daily, and finally was forced to resign on September 13, 1932, handing power to General Bartolomé Blanche.

== See also ==
- History of Chile
- List of Government Juntas of Chile
- List of Chilean coups d'état
- List of Heads of State
