= Alberto Cabero =

Chilean politician

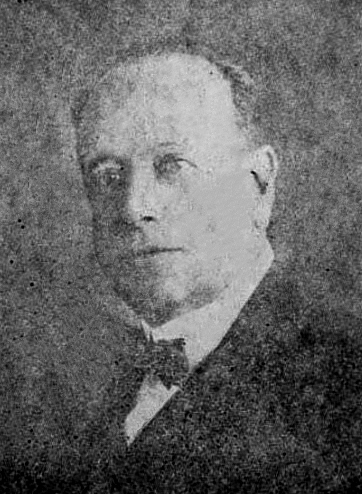

Minister of War and Navy
- In office 24 December 1938 – 12 April 1939
- President: Pedro Aguirre Cerda
- Preceded by: Emilio Bello
- Succeeded by: Guillermo Labarca

Minister of Lands and Colonization
- In office 24 March 1937 – 25 May 1937
- President: Arturo Alessandri
- Preceded by: Alejandro Errázuriz Mackenna
- Succeeded by: Alejandro Errázuriz Mackenna

President of the Senate
- In office 1932–1933
- Preceded by: Pedro Opazo
- Succeeded by: Ignacio Urrutia Manzano

Member of the Government Junta
- In office 1932–1932
- Preceded by: Pedro Cárdenas Avendaño
- Succeeded by: None

Personal details
- Born: 20 March 1874 Santiago, Chile
- Party: Radical Party
- Spouse: Lía Henríquez Novoa
- Parent(s): Telésforo Cabero; Filomena Díaz
- Education: University of Chile
- Occupation: Lawyer

Alberto Cabero Díaz (20 March 1874 – 13 October 1955) was a Chilean politician, President of the Chilean Senate and Member of Government Junta in 1932. He was a member of the Radical Party.

He was born in Santiago, the son of Telésforo Cabero del Canto and of Filomena Díaz. He completed his studies in the Instituto Nacional, and then attended the Universidad de Chile, where he became a lawyer. He started his political career as the first mayor of the city of Río Claro. He was elected a deputy for Curicó (1921–1924) and a Senator for Talca (1924–1930) and Talca, Linares and Curico (1930–1932).

At the time of the Socialist Republic of Chile in 1931, he was the President of the Senate. As such he took over as provisional vice president. He assumed on 26 July, and that same night he formed his cabinet, headed by Juan Esteban Montero as interior minister and Pedro Blanquier as Finance minister.

When the ministers arrived on the next morning, Opazo resigned by decree on Montero. His entire administration had lasted less than 24 hours. The speed he demonstrated to get rid of the power earned him the nickname of El Pasador (the relayer), that accompanied him until his death.

After his very brief administration, he was elected Senator for Curicó, Talca, Maule y Linares (1933–1937). He was Ambassador of Chile to the United States from 1939 to 1942. He died in Santiago on 13 October 1955.

== Biography ==
He was born in Santiago on 20 March 1874, son of Telésforo Cabero del Canto and Filomena Díaz. He married Lía Henríquez Novoa, and they had one son.

He studied at the Instituto Nacional and at the Faculty of Law of the University of Chile. He qualified as lawyer on 21 August 1901; his thesis was titled Obligaciones naturales.

At the age of fifteen he worked as customs dispatcher in the commercial house Hagen y Jacobsen in Coronel. He later served as sub-director of the Escuela de Artes and professor of Spanish at the Instituto Barros Arana and at the Liceo de Antofagasta, where he also acted as Defender of Minors. He was conservator of Real Estate and Mines of Antofagasta and held advisory positions in public financial institutions.

He was member of the Radical Party and served as president of its Central Board.

He was appointed Intendant of Antofagasta from 30 December 1918 to 2 January 1920 and later Intendant of Santiago.

Following the fall of President Juan Esteban Montero Rodríguez, he joined the Third Government Junta of the Socialist Republic from 16 to 30 June 1932, alongside Carlos Dávila Espinoza and Pedro Nolasco Cárdenas Avendaño. He presented his resignation on 20 June 1932.

He served as Minister of Lands and Colonization under President Arturo Alessandri Palma between 24 March and 25 May 1937. In 1938 President Pedro Aguirre Cerda appointed him Minister of National Defense from 24 December 1938 to 12 April 1939. He was subsequently ambassador of Chile to the United States from 1939 to 1942.

Between 1942 and 1947 he was president of the Caja de Amortización de la Deuda Pública. He authored the socio-political study Chile y los chilenos and collaborated in the press on political matters. He was member and counselor of the National Bar Association.
