= Government Junta of Chile (December 1811) =

Ruling body of Chile from December 1811 to April 1812

Government Junta of Chile (December 16, 1811), was the political structure established to rule Chile following a Military Coup organized by José Miguel Carrera. It lasted until replaced by the Superior Governmental Junta.

Position	Name
Members	José Miguel Carrera; Juan José Aldunate; José Nicolás de la Cerda
Secretary	Manuel Rodríguez

== See also ==
- History of Chile
- List of Government Juntas of Chile
