= Marmaduke Grove =

Chilean socialist politician and officer (1878–1954)

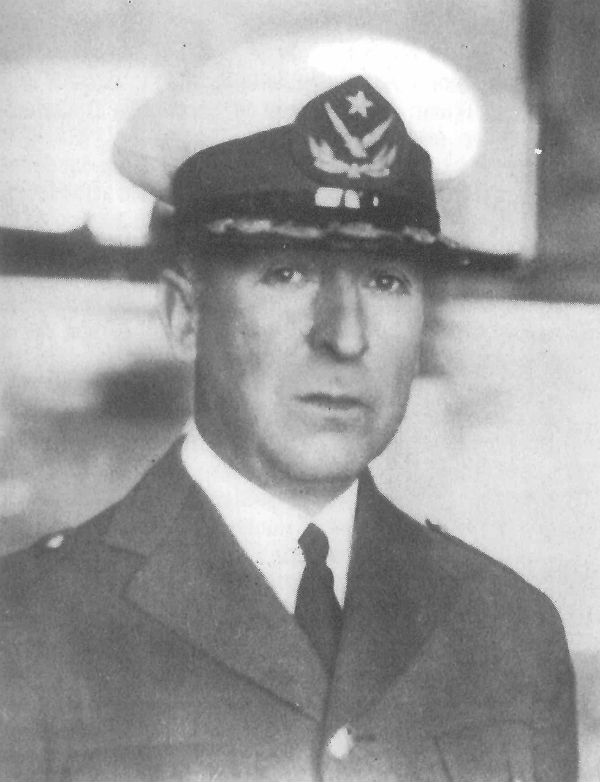
- Grove in 1932

Member of the Senate
- In office 9 May 1934 – 15 May 1949
- Preceded by: Eugenio Matte Hurtado
- Constituency: 4th Provincial Grouping

Commander-in-Chief of the Chilean Air Force
- In office 1931–1932
- Preceded by: Ramón Vergara Montero
- Succeeded by: Diego Aracena

Personal details
- Born: July 6, 1878 Copiapó, Chile
- Died: May 15, 1954 (aged 75) Santiago, Chile

Marmaduke Grove Vallejo (July 6, 1878 – May 15, 1954), was a Chilean Air Force officer, political figure and member of the Government Junta of the Socialist Republic of Chile in 1932.

== Early life ==
Grove was born in Copiapó, Chile, the son of lawyer, José Marmaduke Grove Avalos and Ana Vallejo Burgos. His first studies were in School Nº 1 of Copiapó and later at the local Liceum. In 1891, his father, a leader of the local chapter of the Radical Party, was imprisoned for criticizing President Jose Manuel Balmaceda.

From a very young age he was interested in the army, and in 1892, was accepted to the Chilean Naval Academy. In 1894, he was expelled from the navy for participating in a student revolt against directors of the academy. That incident proved to be his turning point and from then on he declared his motto to be an "undying love for the underdogs and for true justice".

In 1897, Grove was accepted in the Military Academy, from which he graduated as an artillery sub-lieutenant. At the Military Academy, he was a classmate of Carlos Ibáñez del Campo and Arturo Puga, both of whom he remained in contact with for the rest of his long military and political life. In 1906, he was sent to Germany to specialize in artillery, and remained there until 1911. By 1912 he had become a Freemason and the following year he joined the War Academy. Later he was transferred to the Tacna Garrison, where he remained until 1917, during which time he married Rebeca Valenzuela, with whom he had six children.

Grove had a brilliant military career, and from 1920 to 1924 he was Under-Director of the Military Academy. After being promoted to Colonel, he was named Director of the Air Force Academy in 1925.

== Political career ==
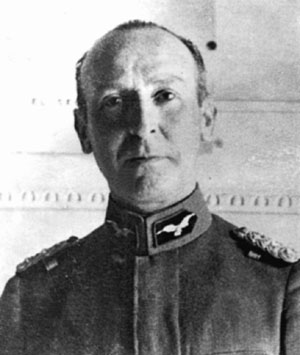
Marmaduke Grove in uniform

Grove first involved himself with politics in 1924. On September 3, 1924, he had a notorious participation in the incident known as the "saber rattling", where 56 military officers protested against their low salaries. The next day the officers involved created the "military committee" to defend themselves from the government. He was selected to carry the petitions to the president. These included increase of the military salaries, changes to the income tax, constitutional reforms, and changes to the employment code. He also was in charge of obtaining the support from the navy officers, which he got. He also tried his hand at journalism, and had a column in the newspaper La Nación supporting the committee, under the byline of Ekud.

This incident was a turning point. Even though the petitions were approved, the committee was not dissolved. President Arturo Alessandri, noticing that he had lost control over these officers, resigned and left the country on September 10. This led to the creation of a government junta, sometimes called the September Junta, with the participation of Carlos Ibáñez del Campo.

=== Calais pact ===
In 1925, Grove was promoted to colonel and started a long period of travels through Europe, as military attaché. When Carlos Ibáñez del Campo became president, he was confirmed as military attaché in London, as a way to keep him outside the country. While in London, he contacted ex-president Alessandri who was also in exile. Together they started to conspire against Ibáñez. On January 17, 1929, together with the also exiled General Enrique Bravo and major Carlos Millán, they signed the "Calais pact" and swore to bring democracy back to Chile. In November of that year, a meeting of the conspirators was discovered at Dover by the Ibáñez agents, and on November 28 he was sent into retirement from the army and deported to Buenos Aires.

=== The little red plane ===
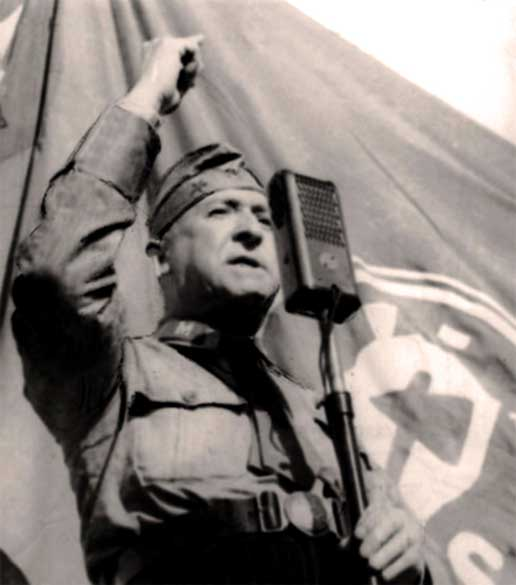
Grove during a rally in 1930

Once in Argentina, Grove immediately started to conspire again. On September 21, 1930, he flew to Chile in a little red plane and landed in Concepción. The plan failed and Grove, together with lieutenant Carlos Charlín Ojeda were arrested and deported to Easter Island. He managed to escape from there on board a French corvette bound for Tahiti, and from there he went to Marseille. Nonetheless he only was able to return to Chile after the fall of Ibáñez on July 26, 1931.

=== Socialist Republic of Chile ===
Once back in Chile, President Juan Esteban Montero reincorporated Grove to the Army and on March 17, 1932, promoted him to Air Commodore and named him Air Force Commander-in-chief. Still, Grove continued conspiring against Montero, and toppled him on June 4, 1932, through a military coup. He then proceeded to create the Socialist Republic of Chile. This republic lasted only 12 days.

The Socialist republic was headed by a Government Junta composed of General Arturo Puga, Carlos Dávila and Eugenio Matte. He became Defense minister, a position he held from June 5 to June 16, 1932.

In that short time, the Socialist republic only managed to approve a few social measures, such as the obligation of the Central Bank to grant credits to small mining and agricultural concerns and the return of the pawned articles at the government-owned pawnbroker to their owners. They also established diplomatic relations with the Soviet Union.

The Government Junta was in turn toppled by Carlos Dávila on June 16, 1932, who in turn remained in power for only one hundred days. In the meantime, Grove was once again exiled to Easter Island.

=== Presidential candidate ===
During the presidential elections of 1932, Grove was nominated as a candidate by the Socialist forces. He was only able to return from his exile on Easter Island two days before the election, but still managed to finish second, behind Arturo Alessandri, with 17.7% of the vote.

== Later life ==
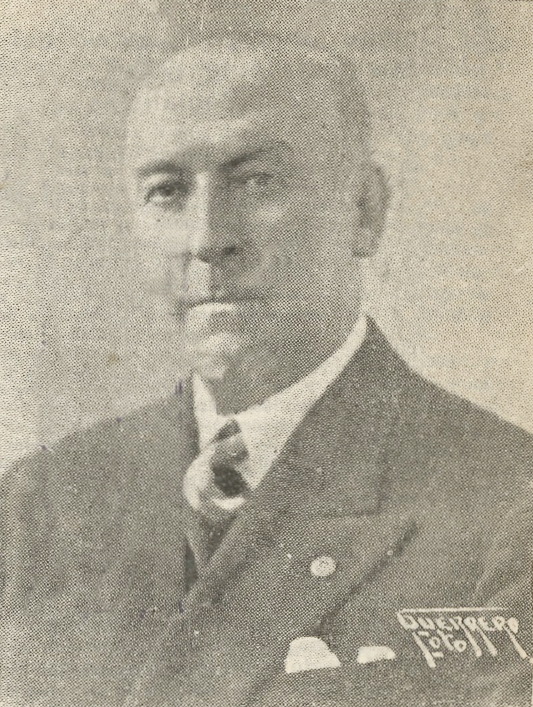
Grove in 1946

On April 19, 1933, together with Oscar Schnake, Salvador Allende, and Carlos Alberto Martínez, Grove founded the Socialist Party of Chile. He became General Secretary of that party in 1938 and president of the Popular Front coalition that won the presidential election that same year with the candidate Pedro Aguirre Cerda.

Grove was elected Senator on May 9, 1934, in a by-election held to replace deceased Senator Eugenio Matte Hurtado, who had died in January of that year. His slogan was, "From the jail to the Senate", because he had to campaign from jail, where he was kept for conspiring against President Alessandri. As senator he proposed the first plan of Agrarian Reform in Chile in 1939. His slogan this time was, "Neither land without men nor men without land" (Ni tierra sin hombres, ni hombres sin tierra). He was reelected as a Senator in 1941. He was defeated by Carlos Ibáñez del Campo and retired from the Senate in 1949.

Grove died at the age of 75 on May 15, 1954, in Santiago, Chile.

Political offices
Preceded by Ignacio Urrutia Manzano	Minister of Defense; 1932	Succeeded by Arturo Puga
Military offices
Preceded by Ramon Vergara	Air Force Commander-in-chief; 1932	Succeeded by Diego Aracena
