= Socialist Republic of Chile =

Government of Chile from June to September 1932

Socialist Republic of Chile República Socialista de Chile (Spanish)
- 1932
- Flag Coat of arms
- Anthem: Himno Nacional de Chile; National Anthem of Chile
- Location of the Socialist Republic of Chile in South America.
- Status: Provisional government
- Capital and largest city: Santiago
- Common languages: Spanish
- Demonym: Chilean
- Government: Socialist republic under a provisional military junta
- President
  - 1932: Carlos Davila
- Historical era: Great Depression
  - Established: 4 June 1932
  - Disestablished: 13 September 1932
- ISO 3166 code: CL
Preceded by	Succeeded by
Presidential Republic (1925–1973)	Presidential Republic (1925–1973)

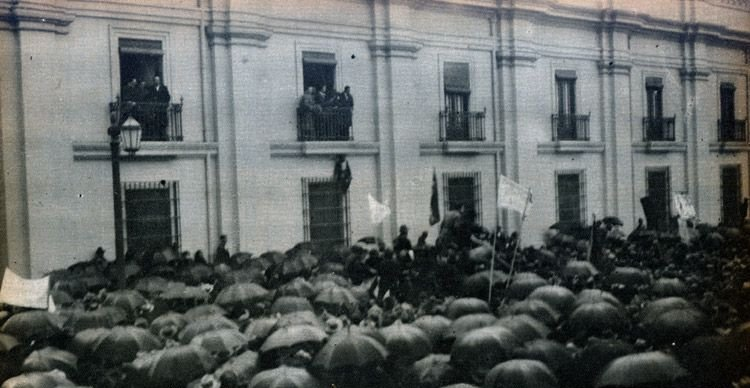
March in support of the proclamation of the Socialist Republic of Chile, in front of La Moneda Palace (June 12, 1932)

The Socialist Republic of Chile (Spanish: República Socialista de Chile) was a short-lived (4 June 1932 – 13 September 1932) political entity in Chile, that was proclaimed by the Government Junta that took over that year.

== Background ==
In July 1925, the military junta led by Arturo Alessandri, created a project with the sole aim of constitutional reform. The Constitution of 1925 set forth a governmental system that eschewed the parliamentarian ways of the old constitution that had existed for some ninety-two years. Instead, the Constitution of 1925 reintroduced the position of President in Chilean politics. The new constitution created a strong executive and weakened the Chamber of Deputies and the Senate. This new constitution deprived both chambers of much of their power to fire ministers. Instead, the Chamber of Deputies could bring accusations before the senate.

Over the course of the years 1926 and 1927, General Carlos Ibáñez del Campo maneuvered his way into power, first as the Minister of War, then Minister of the Interior, then Vice President, before finally on May 4, 1927, President Figueroa resigned as president. Between 1927 and 1931, Chile was governed by General Carlos Ibáñez del Campo, who carried out a corporatist policy, in order to undermine the influence of leftist groups.

The market crash of 1929 greatly affected Chile, vastly decreasing demand for Chilean exports. This market volatility greatly affected Chilean politics and by 1931 the congress had given enough of their legislative powers to Ibáñez, that Chile became a dictatorship in a fashion. With resources becoming less and less available, political unrest began to manifest itself around the country. This political unrest came to a head in July 1931 when university students took control of the university grounds. With the political situation in Chile becoming more and more untenable, President Ibáñez resigned and left the country.

President Juan Esteban Montero had assumed office on November 15, 1931. By mid-1932, he was already in serious problems, due to the economic impact of the market crash of 1929. To the very grave social and economic problems he faced, he could add the growing political instability that was gripping the country. He was pictured as an inefficient and unpopular leader, and the number of conspiracies that sought to displace him was growing by the day.

On June 4, 1932, a group of young socialists under the leadership of Eugenio Matte; some air force personnel under colonel Marmaduke Grove; and some army personnel (followers of former president Carlos Ibáñez del Campo) under Carlos Dávila staged a coup d'état by taking over the Air Force base of El Bosque, in Santiago, demanding the resignation of President Montero.

Montero refused to call on the army to put down the coup, and instead chose to resign. That same night, the victorious revolutionaries organized a Government Junta composed of retired General Arturo Puga, Eugenio Matte and Carlos Davila, with Colonel Grove as their Minister of Defense. They immediately proceeded to proclaim the Socialist Republic of Chile.

== Creation and fall ==
The proclamation took by surprise and divided public opinion immediately. The Communist Party of Chile (PCCh) and the trade unions manifested their opposition, because they considered the coup as "militarist". At the same time, businessmen, professionals and students of the Pontifical Catholic University of Chile also heatedly opposed it on ideological grounds. Overall, the new republic received only guarded support from socialists and workers' associations.

A few days following the proclamation of the "Socialist Republic of Chile", the Junta dissolved Congress and, among other measures, stopped evictions from low-rental properties, decreed a three-day bank holiday (which was followed by strict controls on withdrawals), and ordered the "Caja de Crédito Popular" (a savings and loan bank for Chileans of modest means) to return clothes and tools which had been pawned there. The Junta pardoned those involved in the Sailors' mutiny.

The new Junta ordered a half-million free meals served daily to the unemployed. State pawnshops had to return, free of charge, sewing machines and tools pawned by the "certified unemployed." The Junta quickly ran short on funds, so it ordered the police to confiscate jewelry from the jewelry shops in Santiago, giving each jeweler a receipt which they could cash in for paper pesos. Credits and deposits in foreign currency at the national and foreign banks operating in Chile were declared the property of the State. A General Commissariat of Subsistence and Prices was also established with the authority to fix the price of staple foods.

These measures created dissent within the government and the followers of General Ibáñez opposed the radicalization of the socialist movement promoted by Grove and Matte. On June 13, Carlos Dávila resigned in protest. Three days later, on June 16, and with the support of the army, he proceeded to expel the socialist members of the government and replace them with his own supporters. Eugenio Matte and Marmaduke Grove were arrested and exiled to Easter Island. Some historians consider this date as the true end of the socialist republic.

With army support, Carlos Dávila, proclaimed himself provisional President of the "Socialist Republic of Chile". At the same time he declared a state of emergency, press censorship, and a host of centrally-planned economic measures. Nonetheless, the lack of military and public opinion support forced him to resign on September 13, 1932. The office was passed onto General Bartolomé Blanche, who was replaced, under threat of a military uprising, by the President of the Supreme Court, Abraham Oyanedel, who immediately called for presidential and congressional elections.

== See also ==
- Presidential Republic
- Government Junta of 1932
- List of Government Juntas of Chile
- List of Chilean coups d'état
- List of Heads of State
