= Carlos Dávila =

Chilean political figure and journalist

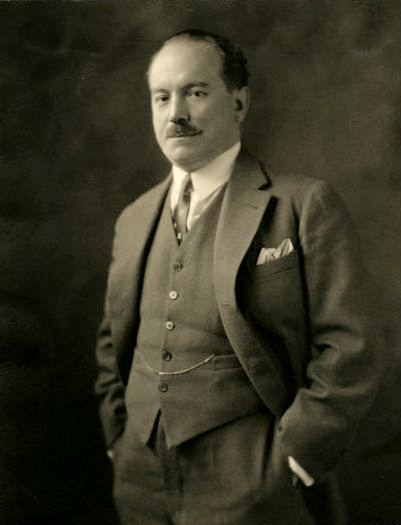

Secretary General of the Organization of American States
- In office 1954 – October 19, 1955
- Preceded by: Alberto Lleras Camargo
- Succeeded by: José Antonio Mora

Provisional President of Chile
- In office July 8, 1932 – September 13, 1932
- Preceded by: Himself (Junta government)
- Succeeded by: Bartolomé Blanche

President of Government Junta of Chile
- In office June 16, 1932 – July 8, 1932
- Preceded by: Arturo Puga
- Succeeded by: Himself (non-Junta government)

Personal details
- Born: Carlos Gregorio Dávila Espinoza; September 15, 1887 Los Ángeles, Chile
- Died: October 19, 1955 (aged 68) Washington D.C., United States
- Party: Socialist Party
- Spouses: Herminia Arrate (m. 1918; died 1941) Frances Adams Moore (m. 1950)

Carlos Gregorio Dávila Espinoza (September 15, 1887 – October 19, 1955) was a Chilean political figure, journalist, chairman of the Government Junta of Chile in 1932, and secretary general of the Organization of American States (OAS) from 1954 until his death in 1955.

== Early life ==
Dávila was born in Los Ángeles, Chile, to Luis Dávila and Emilia Espinoza. He graduated from the University of Santiago, Chile, (then called School of Arts and Crafts) in 1907. In 1911, he entered law school at the University of Chile, but dropped out three years later to work for newspaper El Mercurio, of Santiago. He left that paper in 1917 to establish La Nación of the same city, which he directed until 1927. In 1932, he founded the Chilean magazine Hoy.

== Political career ==
From 1927 to 1931, Dávila served as Chilean ambassador to the United States. In 1929, he received an honorary LL.D. from Columbia University, and another the same year from the University of Southern California, in Los Angeles, California.

=== Socialist Republic of Chile ===
Dávila was a member of the Government Junta of Chile that controlled Chile from June 4 to July 8, 1932, serving as president of the Government Junta from June 16. On July 8, Dávila dissolved the Government Junta and assumed power as "Provisional President of Chile", calling new congressional elections. He served as provisional President of Chile until September 13, one of six people during that year to lead the country as President of Chile and/or President of the Government Junta.

=== Professor, journalist and international public service ===
In 1933, Dávila was visiting professor of international law at the University of North Carolina at Chapel Hill, under the auspices of the Carnegie Endowment for International Peace. Later he came to the United States and was associated for many years with the Editors Press Service, and acted as correspondent for numerous important South American newspapers. In 1941 he received the Maria Moors Cabot Award from Columbia University for his distinguished journalistic contribution in the service of the Americas. A prolific writer, Dávila is the author of "We of the Americas", published in 1949 and has contributed many analytical studies on politics and economics to leading American publications.

Dávila served on the Council of the United Nations Relief and Rehabilitation Administration from 1943 to 1946, and was Chilean representative to the Inter-American Financial and Economic Advisory Committee in 1940. In the same year, he became the author of the "Dávila plan", which created the Inter-American Development Commission, which became the Inter-American Council for Integral Development within the Organization of American States, when that body was created in 1948. In 1946, he served as a member of the United Nations Economic and Social Council.

Having contributed to the founding of the OAS, Dávila was chosen, in August 1954, as its secretary general.

== Cabinet ==
=== Government Junta ===
Portfolio	Minister	Took office	Left office	Party
Government Junta
President of the Junta	Carlos Dávila	16 June 1932	8 July 1932	Independent
Members	Alberto Cabero	16 June 1932	29 June 1932	Radical
Members	Nolasco Cárdenas	16 June 1932	8 July 1932	Democrat
Members	Eliseo Peña	30 June 1932	8 July 1932	Socialist Radical Party
Ministers
Minister of the Interior	Juan Antonio Rios	16 June 1932	8 July 1932	Independent
Minister of Foreign Affairs and Commerce	Luis Barriga Errázuriz	16 June 1932	8 July 1932	Nueva Acción Pública
Minister of Finance	Enrique Zañartu	16 June 1932	8 July 1932	Liberal Democratic
Minister of Justice	Santiago Pérez Peña	16 June 1932	8 July 1932	Independent
Minister of Public Education	Carlos Soto Rengifo	16 June 1932	8 July 1932	Independent
Minister of National Defense	Arturo Puga	16 June 1932	8 July 1932	Military
Minister of Development	Víctor Navarrete Senn	16 June 1932	8 July 1932	Independent
Minister of Land and Colonisation	Virgilio Jesús Morales	16 June 1932	8 July 1932	Democrat
Minister of Agriculture	Arturo Riveros	16 June 1932	8 July 1932	Radical
Minister of Labour	Ignacio Toro Espinoza	16 June 1932	8 July 1932	Independent
Minister of Public Health	Alfonso Quijano Olivares	16 June 1932	8 July 1932	Democrat

=== Provisional Presidency ===
Portfolio	Minister	Took office	Left office	Party
Minister of the Interior	Juan Antonio Rios	8 July 1932	13 July 1932	Independent
Minister of the Interior	Eliseo Peña	13 July 1932	1 August 1932	Socialist Radical Party
Minister of the Interior	Joaquín Fernández Fernández	1 August 1932	12 September 1932	Independent
Minister of the Interior	Bartolomé Blanche	12 September 1932	13 September 1932	Military
Minister of Foreign Affairs and Commerce	Luis Barriga Errázuriz	8 July 1932	13 September 1932	Nueva Acción Pública
Minister of Finance	Enrique Zañartu	8 July 1932	16 August 1932	Liberal Democratic
Minister of Finance	Ernesto Barros Jarpa	16 August 1932	13 September 1932	Independent
Minister of Justice	Guillermo Bañados Honorato	11 July 1932	13 September 1932	Democrat
Minister of Public Education	Carlos Soto Rengifo	8 July 1932	1 August 1932	Independent
Minister of Public Education	Luis Cruz Ocampo	1 August 1932	13 September 1932	Independent
Minister of War and Aviation	Pedro Lagos Lagos	8 July 1932	13 September 1932	Military
Minister of Navy	Francisco Nieto	8 July 1932	11 August 1932	Military
Minister of Navy	Alberto Barbosa Baeza	11 August 1932	13 August 1932	Military
Minister of Navy	José Manuel Montalva	13 August 1932	13 September 1932	Military
Minister of Development	Víctor Navarrete Senn	8 July 1932	13 September 1932	Independent
Minister of Land and Colonisation	Eliseo Peña	8 July 1932	1 August 1932	Socialist Radical Party
Minister of Land and Colonisation	Arturo Riveros	1 August 1932	13 September 1932	Radical
Minister of Agriculture	Arturo Riveros	8 July 1932	13 September 1932	Radical
Minister of Labour	Ignacio Toro Espinoza	8 July 1932	1 August 1932	Independent
Minister of Labour	Juan Bautista Rossetti	1 August 1932	13 September 1932	Socialist Radical Party
Minister of Public Health	Alfonso Quijano Olivares	8 July 1932	13 September 1932	Democrat

== Personal life ==
On 10 August 1918, Dávila married the artists Herminia Arrate with whom he had two daughters. In 1941, following Arrate's death in Santiago, Dávila returned to the United States with their two daughters. In 1950, he remarried, this time to Frances Adams Moore of Massachusetts, a widow with a daughter, Dolly, by her first husband.

Dávila died on 19 October 1955, 14 months into his service as secretary general of the Organization of American States.

Political offices
Preceded by Arturo Puga	Provisional President of Chile; 1932	Succeeded by Bartolomé Blanche
Diplomatic posts
Preceded by Alberto Lleras Camargo	Secretary General of the Organization of American States; 1954-1955	Succeeded by José Antonio Mora
