= Socialist Party of Chile =

Political party in Chile

Socialist Party of Chile Partido Socialista de Chile
- Abbreviation: PS
- President: Paulina Vodanovic
- Secretary-General: Arturo Barrios (acting)
- Chief of Senators: Juan Luis Castro
- Chief of Deputies: Raúl Leiva
- Founders: Marmaduke Grove; Óscar Schnake; Carlos Alberto Martínez; Salvador Allende
- Founded: 19 April 1933; 93 years ago
- Headquarters: Barrio París-Londres, Santiago, Chile
- Youth wing: Socialist Youth of Chile
- Membership (2026): 43,252 (4th)
- Ideology: Social democracy; Democratic socialism; Reformism; Factions: Socialism (multi-tendency); Before 1990: Classical Marxism; Marxism-Leninism (from 1967); Revolutionary socialism; Left-wing nationalism; Left-wing populism; Latin American integration
- Political position: Centre-left to left-wing Before 1990: Left-wing
- National affiliation: Unity for Chile (2023); Democratic Socialism; New Social Pact (2021); Constituent Unity (2020–2021)
- International affiliation: Progressive Alliance; Socialist International
- Regional affiliation: São Paulo Forum; COPPPAL
- Colours: Red
- Chamber of Deputies: 11 / 155
- Senate: 7 / 50
- Constitutional Council: 6 / 51
- Regional boards: 23 / 302
- Mayors: 22 / 345
- Communal Councils: 274 / 2,252

Party flag

Website
- pschile.cl

The Socialist Party of Chile (Spanish: Partido Socialista de Chile, PS) is a centre-left to left-wing political party founded in 1933.

Its historic leader was President of Chile Salvador Allende, who was deposed in a coup d'état by General Augusto Pinochet in 1973. The military junta immediately banned socialist, Marxist and other leftist political parties. Members of the Socialist party and other leftists were subject to violent suppression, including torture and murder, under the Pinochet dictatorship, and many went into exile.

Twenty-seven years after the 1973 coup, Ricardo Lagos Escobar won the Presidency as the Socialist Party candidate in the 1999–2000 Chilean presidential election. Socialist Michelle Bachelet won the 2005–06 Chilean presidential election. She was the first female president of Chile and was succeeded by Sebastián Piñera in 2010. In the 2013 Chilean general election, she was again elected president, leaving office in 2018.

== History ==
=== Beginnings ===
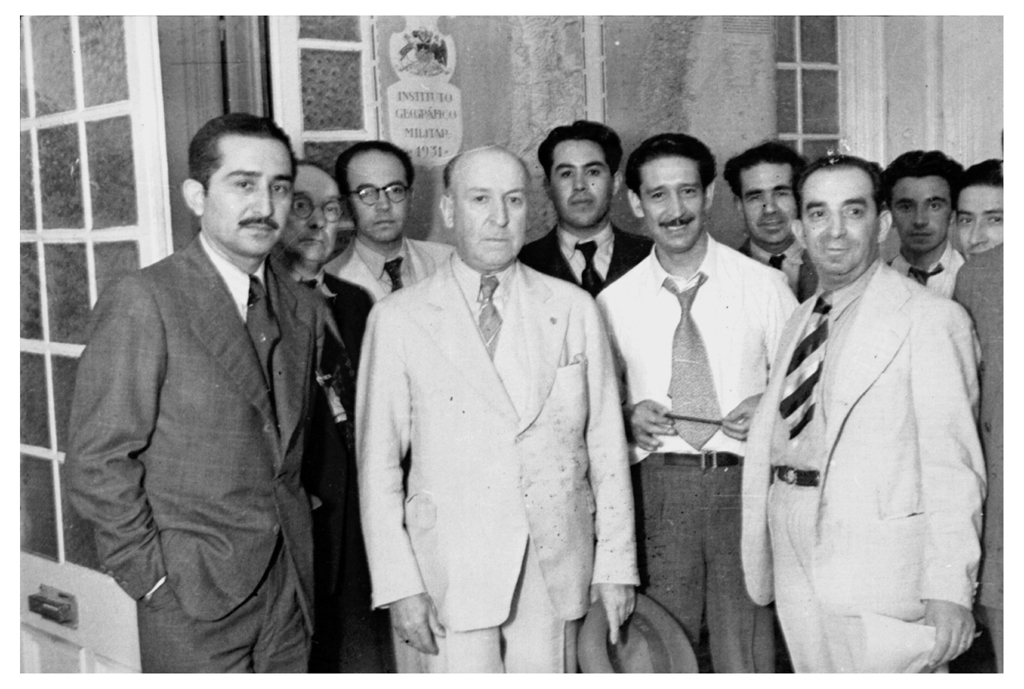
Chilean Socialist Party figures, 1940 (Marmaduke Grove in center)

The Socialist Party of Chile was co-founded on 19 April 1933 by Colonel Marmaduque Grove, who had already led several governments, Oscar Schnake, Carlos Alberto Martínez, future President Salvador Allende, and other personalities. After the Chilean coup of 1973 it was proscribed (along with the other leftist parties constituting the Popular Unity coalition) and the party split into several groups which would not reunite until after the return to civilian rule in 1990.

Socialist thought in Chile goes back to the mid-19th century, when Francisco Bilbao and Santiago Arcos opened a debate on civil rights and social equality in Chile. These ideas took hold in the labour movement at the beginning of the 20th century and, along with them, the various communist, anarchist, socialist, and mutualist ideals of the time were diffused by writers and leaders such as Luis Emilio Recabarren. The impact of the 1917 October Revolution in Russia imparted new vigor to Chile's revolutionary movements, which in the 1920s were mostly identified with the global Communist movement; the Communist Party of Chile was formed.

The Great Depression in the 1930s plunged the country's working and middle classes into a serious crisis that led them to sympathize with socialist ideas, which found expression in the establishment of the short-lived Socialist Republic of Chile in 1932. The idea of founding a political party to unite the different movements identified with socialism took shape in the foundation of the Socialist Party of Chile, on 19 April 1933. At a conference in Santiago, at 150 Serrano, 14 delegates from the Socialist Marxist Party led by Eduardo Rodriguez Mazer; 18 from the New Public Action, headed by the lawyer Eugenio Matte Stolen; 12 delegates of the Socialist Order, whose main exponent was the architect Arturo Bianchi Gundian; and 26 representatives of the Revolutionary Socialist Action of Óscar Schnake formulated the new party's founding document and its short-term action plan, and elected Óscar Schnake as its first executive Secretary General.

The Party's Statement of Principles was:

- The Socialist Party embodies Marxism, enriched by scientific and social progress.
- The Capitalist exploitation based on the doctrine of private property regarding land, industry, resource, and transportation, necessarily must be replaced by an economically socialist state in which said private property be transformed into collective.
- During the process of total transformation of the system of government, a representative revolutionary government of the manual and intellectual labourers' class is necessary. The new socialist state only can be born of the initiative and the revolutionary action of the proletariat masses.
- The socialist doctrine is of an international character and requires the support of all the workers of the world. The Socialist Party will support their revolutionary goals in economics and politics across Latin America in order to pursue a vision of a Confederacy of the Socialist Republics of the Continent, the first step toward the World Socialist Confederation.

The Party quickly obtained popular support. Its partisan structure exhibits some singularities, such as the creation of "brigades" that group their militants according to environment of activity; brigades that live together organically, and brigades of militant youths such as the Confederacy of the Socialist Youth, and the Confederacy of Socialist Women. In the later 1930s they included the "Left Communist" faction, formed by a split of the Communist Party of Chile, headed by Manuel Noble Plaza and comprising the journalist Oscar Waiss, the lawyer Tomás Chadwick and the first secretary of the PS, Ramón Sepúlveda Loyal, among others.

In 1934, the Socialists, along with the Radical-Socialist Party and the Democratic Party, formed the "Leftist Bloc". In the first parliamentary election (March 1937) they obtained 22 representatives (19 representatives and 3 senators), among them its Secretary general Oscar Schnake, elected senator of Tarapacá-Antofagasta, placed by the PS in a noticeable place inside the political giants of the epoch. For the 1938 presidential election, the PS participated in the formation of the Popular Front, withdrawing its presidential candidate, the colonel Marmaduque Grove, and supporting the Radical Party's candidate, Pedro Aguirre Cerda, who narrowly defeated the right-wing candidate following an attempted coup by the National Socialist Movement of Chile. In the government of Aguirre Cerda the socialists obtained the Ministries of Public Health, Forecast and Social Assistance, given to Salvador Allende, the Minister of Promotion, trusted to Oscar Schnake, and the Ministers of Lands and Colonization, handed out to Rolando Merino.

The participation of the Socialist Party in the government of Aguirre Cerda reached an end on 15 December 1940, due to internal conflicts among the Popular Front coalition, in particular with the Communist Party. In the parliamentary elections of March 1941 the PS advanced outside of the Popular Front and obtained 17,9% of the votes, 17 representatives and 2 senators. The PS integrated into the new leftist coalition following Cerda's death, now named Democratic Alliance, which supported the candidacy of the Radical Juan Antonio Ríos, who was triumphantly elected. The Socialists participated in his cabinet, alongside Radicals, members of the Democratic Party and of the Liberal Party and even of the National Falange. Oscar Schnake occupied once again the post of Promotion and the socialist Pedro Populate Vera and Eduardo Escudero Forrastal assumed the positions of Lands and Colonization and Social Assistance, respectively.

The youth of the party assumed a very critical attitude toward these changes and mergers, which caused the expulsion of all the Central Committee of the FJS, among them Raúl Vásquez (its secretary general), Raúl Ampuero, Mario Palestro and Carlos Briones. In the IX Congress of the PS of the year 1943 Salvador Allende displaced Marmaduque Grove as Secretary General and withdrew his party from the government of Ríos. Grove did not accept this situation, and was expelled from the PS and formed the Authentic Socialist Party. These conflicts caused the PS to drop violently to only 7% of the votes in the parliamentary elections of March 1945, diminishing significantly its parliamentary strength.

=== After World War II ===
The Socialist Party entered into decline in the 1940s.

There was complete confusion in the Socialist Party for the presidential election of 1946. The PS decided to put up its own candidate; its secretary general Bernardo Ibáñez. However, many militants supported the radical candidate Gabriel González Videla, while the Authentic Socialist Party of Grove stopped supporting the liberal Fernando Alessandri.

After the failure of the candidacy of Ibáñez (who obtained barely a 2.5% of the votes), the purges continued. In the XI Ordinary Congress the current "revolution" of Raúl Ampuero was imposed and he assigned to academic Eugenio González the making of the Program of the Socialist Party which defined its north; the Democratic Republic of Workers.

The promulgation, in 1948, of the Law 8.987 "Defense of Democracy Law" that banned the communists, was again a factor of division among the socialists. Bernardo Ibáñez, Oscar Schnake, Juan Bautista Rosseti and other anticommunist socialists supported it with enthusiasm; while the board of directors of the party directed by Raúl Ampuero and Eugenio González rejected it. The anticommunist group of Ibáñez was expelled from the PS and they constituted the Socialist Party of the Workers; nevertheless the Conservative of the electoral Roll assigned to the group of Ibáñez the name Socialist Party of Chile, forcing the group of Ampuero to adopt the name Socialist Popular Party.

The Socialist Popular Party proclamation, in its XIV Congress, carried out in Chillán in May 1952, as its presidential standard bearer to Carlos Ibáñez del Campo, despite the refusal of the senators Salvador Allende and Tomás Chadwick. Allende abandoned the party and united the Socialist Party of Chile, which, as a group with the Communist Party (outlawed), raised the candidacy of Allende for the Front of the People. The triumph of Ibáñez permitted the popular socialists to have important departments such as that of Work (Clodomiro Almeyda) and Estate (Felipe Herrera).

After the parliamentary elections of 1953; where the Socialist Popular Party obtained 5 senators and 19 representatives, the popular socialists abandoned the government of Carlos Ibáñez del Campo and proclaimed the need to establish a Front of Workers, in conjunction with the Democratic Party of the People, the socialists of Chile and the outlawed communists.

Finally, on 1 March 1956, the two socialist parties (Socialist Party of Chile and Socialist Popular Party), the Party of the Workers (communist outlawed), Democratic Party of the People and the Democratic Party all signed the minutes of constitution of the Front of Popular Action (FRAP) with Salvador Allende Gossens as the president of the coalition, which participated successfully in the municipal elections of April 1956.

After the parliamentary elections of March 1957 the "Congress of Unity" was carried to power, formed from the Popular Socialist Party directed by Rául Ampuero and the Socialist Party of Chile of Salvador, directed by Allende Gossens. These chose the secretary general of the unified Socialist Party; Salomón Corbalán.

On 31 July 1958, the Law of Permanent Defense of Democracy was derogated by the National Congress, therefore the ban of the Communist Party was repealed. In the presidential elections of 1958, the standard bearer of the Front of Popular Action (FRAP), the socialist Salvador Allende, lost the presidential election narrowly to Jorge Alessandri. In spite of the loss, the unification of the socialist parties had a new leader, and Chile was one of the few countries of the world in which a Marxist had clear possibilities to win the presidency of the Republic through democratic elections.

The overwhelming triumph of Eduardo Frei Montalva over the candidate of the FRAP Salvador Allende Gossens in the presidential elections of September 1964 caused demoralization among the followers of the "Chilean way to socialism". The National Democratic Party (PADENA) abandoned the coalition of left; and the influence of the Cuban revolution and above all of the "guerrilla way of Ernesto Guevara" they were left to feel the heart of the Socialist Party. The discrepancies of the party were perceived clearly. In July from 1967 the senators Raúl Ampuero and Tomás Chadwick and the representatives Ramón Silva Ulloa, Eduardo Osorio Pardo and Oscar Naranjo Arias were expelled, and founded the popular socialist union (USOPO).

In the XXII Congress, which took place in Chillán in November 1967, the political became more radical, under the influence of Carlos Altamirano Orrego and the leader of the Ranquil Rural Confederation, Rolando Calderón Aránguiz. The party officially adhered to Marxism-Leninism, declared itself in favour of revolutionary, anticapitalist and anti-imperialist changes.

=== Popular Unity government ===
In 1969, skepticism about the "Chilean way to socialism" prevailed in the Central Committee of the Socialist Party. Salvador Allende Gossens was proclaimed as the party's presidential candidate, with 13 votes in favor and 14 abstentions, among them that of its secretary general, Aniceto Rodriguez, of Carlos Altamirano Orrego, and of Clodomiro Almeyda Medina. Nevertheless, the candidacy of Allende galvanized the forces of the left, who formed, in October 1969, the Popular Unity coalition including the Socialist Party, Communist Party, Radical Party, Popular Unitary Action Movement (which had split from the Christian Democrat Party), and Independent Popular Action, consisting of former supporters of Carlos Ibáñez. Popular Unity triumphed in the presidential election of September 1970.

On 24 October 1970 Salvador Allende Gossens was officially proclaimed President of the Republic of Chile. There was world expectation; he agreed to manage the coalition and to be a Marxist president with the explicit commitment to build socialism, while respecting the democratic and institutional mechanisms.

The position of the PS on joining the government of the UP became more radical when senator Carlos Altamirano Orrego took over as party leader, having been elected at the XXIII Congress in La Serena in January 1971. He proclaimed that the party should become "the Chilean vanguard in the march toward socialism".

In the municipal elections of April 1971, the leftist coalition achieved an absolute majority in the election of local councillors, which caused growing polarization due to the alliance of the Christian Democrats with the sectors of the right in the country. The withdrawal of the Party of Radical Left from the government, with its 6 representatives and 5 senators, meant that the government of Allende was left with less than one third of both houses of the parliament.

1973 election poster for PS candidate Fidelma Allende. Slogan reads: Against the Black Market – Forward with the Socialists.

In the parliamentary elections of March 1973, the Popular Unity ruler coalition managed to block a move by the opposing Democratic Confederation to impeach Allende. This initiative did not attain the required two-thirds majority.

=== Coup d'état and political suppression ===
The serious economic problems facing the government only deepened the country's political divisions. The Socialist Party, which had posted its highest electoral showing in history, was opposed, along with MAPU, to any dialogue with the right-wing opposition. Meanwhile, from the United States, a concerted plan was underway to prevent socialists from gaining power around the world, including CIA backing for the right wing in Chile. On 11 September 1973, Augusto Pinochet led the military coup against Allende's government, putting an end to the Presidential Republic Era begun in 1924. President Salvador Allende refused to relinquish power to the Armed Forces, and ultimately committed suicide in his office at the Palace of La Moneda, during an intensive air bombardment of the historic edifice.

The military coup d'état was devastating to the organization of the Chilean Socialist Party. Within a few weeks of the coup, four members of their Central Committee and seven regional secretaries of the Partido Social had been murdered. A further twelve members of the Central Committee were imprisoned, while the remaining members took refuge in various foreign embassies. The Socialist Party's Secretary General, Carlos Altamirano, managed to escape from Chile, appearing in Havana on 1 January 1974, during the anniversary of the Cuban Revolution.

Lack of experience working 'underground' during the ban led to the breakup of the Party's Secret Directorate. The secret services of the military state managed to infiltrate the organization and, one by one, arrested its principal leaders. The bodies of Exequiel Ponce Vicencio, Carlos Lorca Tobar (disappeared 1975), Ricardo Lagos Salinas and Víctor Zerega Ponce were never found.

Other victims of repression were the former home Secretary, José Tohá González and the former Minister of National Defense, Orlando Letelier del Solar. Having reviewed the consequences of the defeat of the Unidad Popular, and observed the experiences of refugees of "true socialism" in Eastern Europe, and seeing the lack of a cohesive strategy to continue against Pinochet's regime, there was deep dissent within its exterior organization, whose central management was in the German Democratic Republic.

In April 1979, the Tercer Pleno Exterior, the majority sector of the party, named Clodomiro Almeyda as the new Secretary General, Galo Gómez as the Assistant Secretary and expelled Carlos Altamirano, Jorge Arrate, Jaime Suaréz, Luis Meneses and Erich Schnake from the party, charging them with being "remnants of a past which is in the process of being overcome who testify to the survival of a nucleus which is irreducible and resistant to the superior qualitative development of a true revolutionary vanguard".

Altamirano, not accepting this, declared a re-organization of the party and called a Conference. The XXIV Conference took place in France in 1980 and Altamirano declared there that, "Only a very deep and rigorous renewal of definitions and proposals for action, language, style and methods of "doing politics" will make our revolutionary action effective (...) It does not force us to "relaunch" the Partido Social (Socialist Party) of Chile. Yes, it means we must "renew it", understand it as our most precious instrument of change, as an option for power, as an alternative to transformation."

=== 1980s reemergence under dictatorship ===
In the 1980s socialist factions reemerged as active opponents to the Pinochet government. A sector, from among the so-called "renewed socialist", founded the Convergencia Socialista (the Socialist Convergence), which contributed to the Movimiento de Acción Popular Unitaria – MAPU (Unified Movement of Popular Action), the peasant worker MAPU, and the Christian Leftists. They aimed, in conjunction with the Christian Democracy, to end dictatorship through "non-disruptive methods". The other sector (majority from among the socialist militants in the interior of the country) formed the "popular rebellion" alliance – an agreement with the Communist Party, the Leftist Revolutionary Movement and the Radical Party of Anselmo Sule. The objectives were the same. After the First National Protest against the Pinochet regime, which occurred on 11 May 1983, the efforts of the different factions of the Socialist Party intensified.

The XXIV ("renewed") Socialist Party Congress, directed by Ricardo Ñúnez, decided to form the Democratic Alliance. This was a coalition of Christian Democrats, Silva Cimma radicals, and sectors from the republican and democratic right wing. They convened the Fourth National Protest Day (11 August 1983) and proposed, in September 1983, the formation of the Socialist Bloc, the first attempt at a unification of Chilean socialism under the slogan "Democracy Now!".

In the meantime, the "Almeyda" Partido Social, in conjunction with the Communist Party, Aníbal Palm radicals and the Leftist Revolutionary Movement, founded the "Movimiento Democrático Popular" (MDP) (Popular Democratic Movement) on 6 September 1983, which caused the Fifth Day of National Protest.

The signing of the National Accord in late August 1985, between the Democratic Alliance and sectors of the right wing aligned to the military regime, deepened divisions among the Chilean left wing. The most radical politico-military arm opposed the method of gradual transition towards democracy. Their primary exponent was the Frente Patriótico Manuel Rodríguez (FPMR) (the Manuel Rodriguez Patriotic Front).

The MAPU-OC, whose main figures were Jaime Gazmuri, Jorge Molina and Jaime Estévez, was added to the "renewed" Partido Social, now directed by Carlos Briones.

In September 1986, the politico-military method of "mass violent insurrectionist uprisings" was finally aborted after the failure of "Operation 20th century", as the assassination attempt on Pinochet by the FPMR was called. Some of the top leaders from among the revolutionary sectors of the "Almeyda" Partido Social, along with conciliators and opportunists, on realizing that the idea of overthrowing the dictatorship was not a viable strategy, began to take control of the party and distance themselves from the Communist Party. As a result, the socialist left wing realized that a "negotiated solution" to the conflict could not be found outside of the provisions of the 1980 Constitution.

In March 1987, Clodomiro Almeyda entered Chile secretly and presented himself before the court to rectify his situation. He was deported to Chile Chico, condemned and deprived of his civic rights.

In April 1987, Ricardo Núñez, new leader of the "renewed" Partido Social, announced, at the 54th Anniversary of the party, "We are not going to remove Pinochet from the political scene using weapons. We shall defeat him with the ballot boxes (..) We are convinced that the town is going to stop Pinochet with the ballot boxes. We are going to build that army of seven million citizens to embrace different alternatives to the Chilean political landscape."

In December 1987 the "renewed" Partido Social founded the Partido por la Democracia (PPD) (Party for Democracy), an "instrumental" party serving as a tool to enable legally democratic forces to participate in the 1988 Plebiscite (Referendum) and in subsequent elections. Ricardo Lagos was appointed as the president. Some radicals, dissident communists, and even democratic liberals joined this party.

In February 1988 the Concertación de Partidos por el No (Coalition of Parties for the 'No') was formed. 17 political parties and movements in Chile joined this coalition. Among them were the members of the Alianza Democrática (the Democratic Alliance), the Almeyda Partido Social, and the Christian Left. The political direction of the campaign fell on the Christian Democratic leader, Patricio Aylwin, and Ricardo Lagos from the PPD. They achieved successful results in the 5 October 1988, Plebiscite, where close to 56% of the valid votes cast rejected the idea that Pinochet would continue as the President of the Republic.

After the October 1988 Plebiscite, the Concertación called for constitutional reform to remove the "authoritarian clauses" of the 1980 Constitution. This proposal by the democratic opposition was partly accepted by the authoritarian government via the 30 July 1989, Plebiscite, where 54 reforms to the existing Constitution were approved. Among these reforms were the revocation of the controversial article 8, which served as the basis for the exclusion of the socialist leader, Clodomiro Almeyda, from political involvement.

In November 1988 the Almeyda Partido Social, the Christian Left and the Communist Party, among other left wing organizations, formed an "instrumental" party called Partido Amplio de Izquierda Socialista (PAIS) (the Broad Left Socialist Party), with Luis Maira as the president and Ricardo Solari as the secretary general.

=== Concertación ===
In May 1989, the "renewed" PS held internal elections by secret ballot by its nationwide membership, for the first time in the history of Chilean socialism. The list composed of Jorge Arrate and Luis Alvarado won, against the competing lists of Erich Schnake and Akím Soto, and of Heraldo Muñoz (supported by Ricardo Lagos' faction within the party).

The winning list of Jorge Arrate represented the tendency of the "socialist renewal", upholding a permanent alliance with the Christian Democrats within the Concertación, and strongly defending the unity of the party, in contrast to other internal tendencies. After the elections the XXV Congress was convoked at Costa Azul, which took the momentous decision for Chilean socialism to abandon its traditional isolationism and join the Socialist International.

In June 1989, the Concertación appointed the Christian Democrat Patricio Aylwin as its standard bearer for the presidential elections. Aylwin had beaten Gabriel Valdés and Eduardo Frei Ruiz-Tagle in the party's internal elections, and a few weeks before the election he received the support of the radicals of Silva Cimma and even of the former Almeyda supporters (PS-Almeyda). Finally the PS-Arrate (or "renewal" PS) dropped its candidate Ricardo Lagos and added itself to the candidacy of Aylwin, who as president of the Christian Democratic Party was one of the main opponents of the Popular Unity government.

Aylwin won easily in the presidential elections of 1989, gaining more than the 55% of the valid votes. "Renewal Socialism" was strengthened as 16 representatives of the PPD were elected, 13 of whom were members of the PS-Arrate. In the matter of senators, three of their members were chosen (Ricardo Núñez Muñoz, Jaime Gazmuri and Hernán Vodanovic), but there was regret over the rout of Ricardo Lagos in his candidacy of Santiago West.

PS-Almeyda obtained seven representatives, two of them standing for the PAIS, and the other five elected as independents within the Concertación list. Rolando Calderon Aránguiz was elected as senator in Magallanes.

The fall of the wall of Berlin, on 9 November 1989, deeply affected the Chilean left, especially in its more orthodox sector. This accelerated the process of unification within the party, which was finalized on 27 December 1989. The Movimiento de Acción Popular Unitaria, led by Oscar Guillermo Garretón, took this chance to join the united PS.

Between 22 and 25 November 1990 the "Salvador Allende Unity Congress" was held, with past leaders such as Raúl Ampuero and Aniceto Rodriguez and the Christian Left headed by its president Luis Maira and its two representatives (Sergio Aguiló and Jaime Naranjo) joining the party. In that Congress Jorge Arrate was chosen as president, Ricardo Núñez Muñoz as vice president and Manuel Almeyda Medina as secretary general.

Hortensia Bussi, the widow of Allende, sent a message to the Congress from Mexico:

I salute with deep feeling the reunification of the Socialist Party of Chile. You all know how I have waited for this moment, certain that Allende's comrades would overcome their differences and rebuild the powerful democratic left that Chile needs.

The first challenges for the unified socialists were the exercise of power and the "double membership" status of the "renewal socialists" as members of both the PS and the PPD. Finally, the Socialist Party decided to have itself recorded under its own name and symbols in the electoral rolls, and gave a two-year time limit to its members to opt for the PS or the PPD. A significant number of "renewal socialists" did not return to the PS; among them Erich Schnake, Sergio Bitar, Guido Girardi, Jorge Molina, Vicente Sotta, Víctor Barrueto and Octavio Jara.

In power, the socialists Enrique Correa (as the minister General Secretary of Government), Carlos Ominami (Economy), Germán Correa (Transportation), Ricardo Lagos and Jorge Arrate (Education) and Luis Alvarado (National Resources) entered the cabinets of President Aylwin, while in the House of Representatives, the socialists José Antonio Viera-Gallo and Jaime Estevéz exercised its presidency.

In the elections of 1992, Germán Correa was chosen as president of the PS, supported by the "renewal" group around Ricardo Núñez Muñoz and the "third way" faction within the Almeyda tendency. They prevailed against Camilo Escalona, Clodomiro Almeyda and Jaime Estevez, representing an alliance between the traditional supporters of Clodomiro Almeyda and one faction of Jorge Arrate's "renewal" tendency.

==== Concertación under Christian Democrat leadership (1990–2000) ====
The left (PS-PPD) backed Ricardo Lagos as the Concertación candidate for the 1993 presidential elections, but he was defeated by the Christian Democrat Eduardo Frei Ruiz-Tagle, gaining only 36.6% of the vote in the primary on 23 May. After Frei became president, the Socialists took up senior posts in his first cabinet: Interior (Germán Correa), Planining (Luis Maira), Labor (Jorge Arrate), and Public Works (Ricardo Lagos).

In the parliamentary elections of December 1997, the PS did badly: its deputies decreased from 16 to 11, and its senators from 5 to 4. Its senatorial candidate Camilo Escalona obtained a mere 16% of the vote in Santiago West.

The detention of Pinochet in London in October 1998 caused tensions within the PS. The Socialist foreign affairs ministers José Miguel Insulza and Juan Gabriel Valdés pressed to have the ex-dictator returned to Chile, while a group of leading Socialists including Isabel Allende Bussi, Juan Pablo Letelier, Fanny Pollarolo and Juan Bustos Ramírez travelled to London to support judge Baltasar Garzón's proceedings for extradition to Spain.

Leading up to the 1999 presidential elections, the PS, PPD and Radical Social-Democratic Party again supported Lagos as candidate. This time Lagos won the primary on 30 May, with 70.2% of votes. In the general election, he won 48.0% in the first round of voting and was elected with 51.3% in the second round.

Despite the party having been reunified in 1990 the Socialist Party had five internal factions; Nueva Izquierda, Generacional, Tercerismo, Arratismo and Nuñismo. By 1998 Arratismo and Nuñismo had merged into Megatendencia while Generacional, a brief tendency called Almeydismo and elements of Nueva Izquierda had merged into Colectivo de Identidad Socialista. Nueva Izquierda and Tercerismo remained as relatively stable factions by 1998.

==== Concertación under Socialist governments (2000–2010) ====
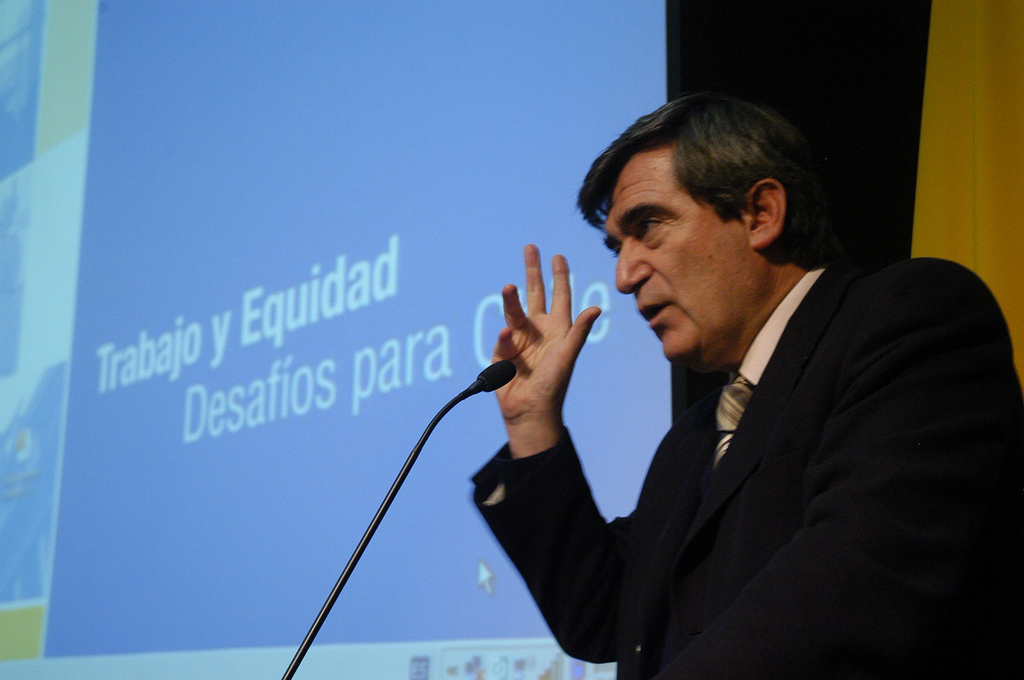
Camilo Escalona, three times president of the Socialist Party: 1994–1998, 2000–2003, and 2006–2010

Lagos was elected president in 1999, defeating the rightwing candidate Joaquín Lavín with 51.3% of the vote, thus becoming the first president in thirty years to have Socialist support – even though Lagos himself was a PD member. Socialist ministers in his first cabinet were José Miguel Insulza (Interior), Ricardo Solari (Labor), Carlos Cruz (Public Works), and Michelle Bachelet (Health).

In the 2001 Chilean parliamentary election, as part of the Coalition of Parties for Democracy, the party won 10 out of 117 seats in the Chamber of Deputies of Chile and 5 out of 38 elected seats in the Senate. The 2001 parliamentary elections were a setback for the Socialists and for the Concertación as a whole. The PS increased its representation by only one deputy and one senator, while the Concertación vote sank below 50% for the first time in its existence.

In September 2003, marking 30 years since the coup against Allende, the Socialist Party issued a document accepting responsibility for the events:

It is beyond all doubt that President Allende maintained an unchanging and impeccable attitude (...) Nevertheless, the socialists have made it clear, and we repeat it now, that we did not do enough to defend the democratic regime. We aimed to carry through a program of change without the necessary majorities in parliament and in society, we remained intransigent in the matter, and we did not give President Allende the support of his party that he needed to lead the government along the pathways that had been defined.

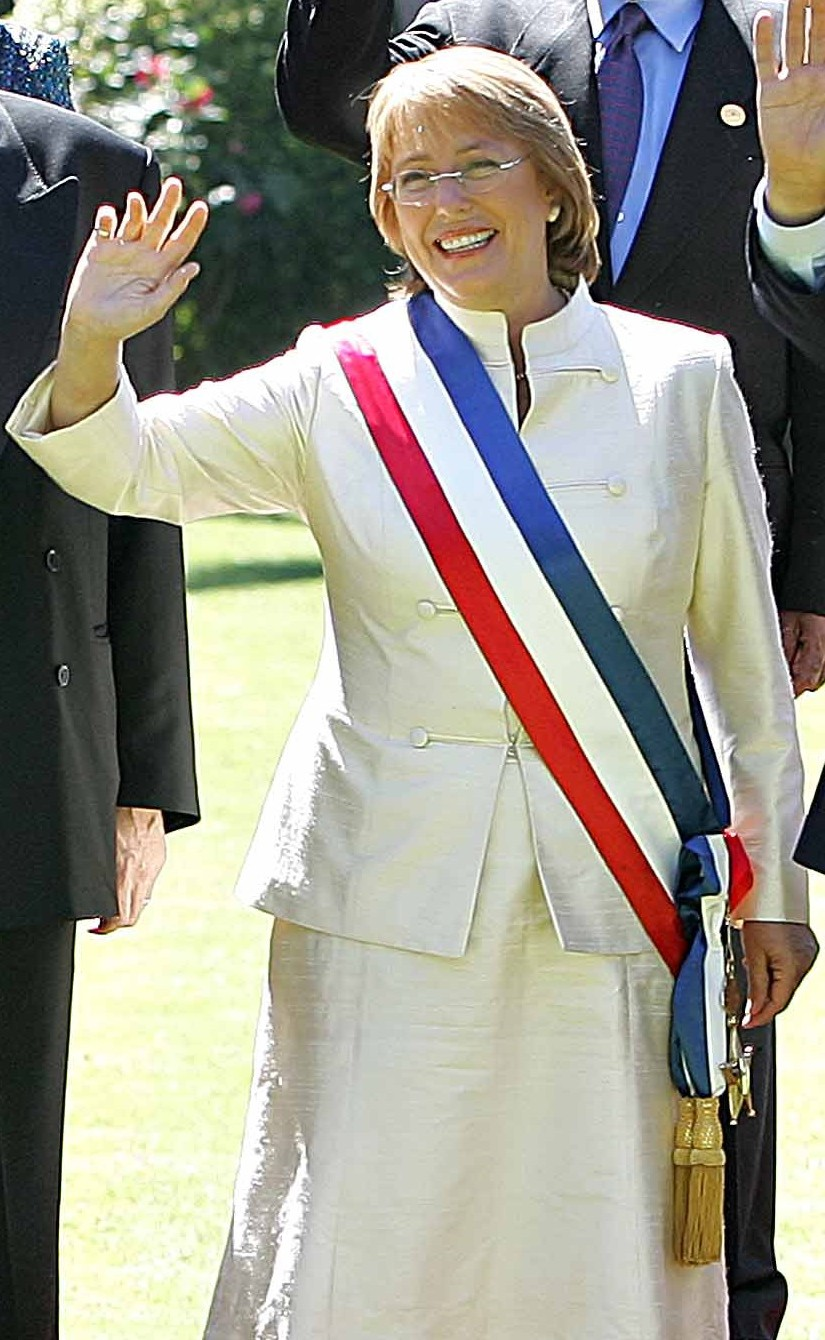
Michelle Bachelet with the presidential sash

The outcome of the 2005 parliamentary elections was favorable both for the Socialists and for the Concertación: the PS increased its deputies from 12 to 15, and its senators from 5 to 8, giving it the largest block it had ever had in the Senate. Moreover, Michelle Bachelet was elected as president of Chile. For its part, the Concertación regained its electoral hegemony, with an absolute majority in both chambers of parliament.

Bachelet took over as president on 11 March 2006. She was the first woman president in the country's history, and the fourth successive president from the Concertación. Her initially high popularity dropped considerably as a result of the 2006 student mobilization known as the "Penguin Revolution", the Transantiago crisis, and various conflicts within the governing coalition. Described as a "social contract", her government reformed pensions and the social security system, aiming to help thousands of Chileans to improve their quality of life. Her government had to confront the world economic crisis of 2008, but her popularity figures recovered as Chileans formed a positive opinion of her leadership, and her final approval rating of 84% had never before been attained by any Chilean head of state on leaving their post.

Within the Party, divisions widened, with dissident factions opposing the policy of Camilo Escalona. Prominent figures including Jorge Arrate, senator Alejandro Navarro and deputy Marco Enriquez-Ominami quit the party in 2008 and 2009.

In the 2009 parliamentary elections, the PS led by Escalona suffered a serious defeat: it lost its dominance of the Senate, holding just 5 seats, and its deputies reduced in number from 15 to 11. Meanwhile, in new presidential elections, the Concertación candidate Eduardo Frei lost to the rightwinger Sebastián Piñera, putting an end to twenty years of Concertación rule.

=== Nueva Mayoría ===
Michelle Bachelet won the second round of the 2013 Chilean presidential election with 62% of the votes. She was the candidate of Nueva Mayoría ("New Majority"), a broadened version of the Concertación now including the Communist Party and others.

== Presidents elected ==
- 1970 – Salvador Allende
- 2000 – Ricardo Lagos (with dual membership in the Party for Democracy)
- 2006 – Michelle Bachelet
- 2014 – Michelle Bachelet

== Election results ==
Due to its membership in the Concert of Parties for Democracy, the party has endorsed the candidates of other parties on several occasions. Presidential elections in Chile are held using a two-round system, the results of which are displayed below.

=== Presidential elections ===
Elections for the President of Chile
Date	Candidate	Party	Round I	Round II	Result
Date	Candidate	Party	%	%	Result
1932	Marmaduke Grove Vallejo	NAP	17.7		Lost
1938	Pedro Aguirre Cerda	PR	50.5		Won
1942	Juan Antonio Ríos	PR	56.0		Won
1946	Bernardo Ibáñez	PS	2.5		Lost
1952	Salvador Allende	PS	5.4		Lost
1958	Salvador Allende	PS	28.8		Lost
1964	Salvador Allende	PS	38.9		Lost
1970	Salvador Allende	PS	36.6		Won
Results from 1989 represent Concertación totals
1989	Patricio Aylwin	PDC	55.2		Won
1993	Eduardo Frei Ruiz-Tagle	PDC	58.0		Won
1999	Ricardo Lagos	PPD	48.0	51.3	Won
2005	Michelle Bachelet	PS	46.0	53.5	Won
2009	Eduardo Frei Ruiz-Tagle	PDC	29.6	48.4	Lost
2013	Michelle Bachelet	PS	46.7	62.2	Won
2017	Alejandro Guillier	Ind.	22.7	45.4	Lost
2021	Yasna Provoste	PDC	11.6		Lost
2025	Jeannette Jara	PCCh	26.85	41.84	Lost

Chamber of Deputies
Election	Leader	Votes	%	Seats	±	Coalition	President
1937	Óscar Schanke	46,050	11.17%	19 / 146 (13%)	N/A	Popular Front	Arturo Alessandri (PL)
1941	Marmaduke Grove	80,377	11.85%	17 / 147 (12%)	-2	Popular Front	Pedro Aguirre Cerda (PR)
1945	Bernardo Ibáñez	32,314	7.13%	6 / 147 (4%)	-11	Democratic Alliance	Juan Antonio Ríos (PR)
1949	Eugenio González	15,676	3.43%	5 / 147 (3%)	-1		Gabriel González Videla (PR)
1953	Raúl Ampuero	41,679	5.56%	9 / 147 (6%)	+4	FRENAP	Carlos Ibáñez del Campo (Ind.)
1957	Salomón Corbalán	38,783	10.67%	7 / 147 (5%)	-2	FRAP	Carlos Ibáñez del Campo (Ind.)
1961	Raúl Ampuero	149,122	11.13%	12 / 147 (8%)	+5	FRAP	Jorge Alessandri (Ind.)
1965	Raúl Ampuero	241,593	10.58%	15 / 147 (10%)	+3	FRAP	Eduardo Frei Montalva (PDC)
1969	Aniceto Rodríguez	294,448	12.76%	15 / 150 (10%)	0	FRAP	Eduardo Frei Montalva (PDC)
1973	Carlos Altamirano	678,796	18.70%	28 / 150 (19%)	+13	Popular Unity	Salvador Allende (PS)
Congress Suspended (1973–1989)
1993	Germán Correa	803,719	11.93%	15 / 120 (13%)	N/A	Concertación	Eduardo Frei Ruiz-Tagle (PDC)
1997	Camilo Escalona	640,397	11.05%	11 / 120 (9%)	-4	Concertación	Eduardo Frei Ruiz-Tagle (PDC)
2001	Camilo Escalona	614,434	10.00%	10 / 120 (8%)	-1	Concertación	Ricardo Lagos (PPD)
2005	Ricardo Núñez	663,561	10.05%	15 / 120 (13%)	+5	Concertación	Michelle Bachelet (PS)
2009	Camilo Escalona	647,533	10.02%	11 / 120 (9%)	-4	Concertación	Sebastián Piñera (RN)
2013	Osvaldo Andrade	690,620	11.13%	17 / 120 (14%)	+6	New Majority	Michelle Bachelet (PS)
2017	Álvaro Elizalde	585,128	9.76%	19 / 155 (12%)	+2	The Force of the Majority	Sebastián Piñera (Ind.)
2021	Álvaro Elizalde	343,437	5.43%	13 / 155 (8%)	-6	New Social Pact	Gabriel Boric (CS)
2025	Paulina Vodanovic	586,348	5.47%	11 / 155 (7%)	-2	Unidad por Chile	José Antonio Kast (PRCh)

== See also ==
- Government Junta of Chile (1973)
- Human rights violations in Pinochet's Chile
- Víctor Olea Alegria, disappeared in 1974
- Carlos Lorca, disappeared in 1975
- Carlos Altamirano, general secretary between 1971 and 1979
- Chamber of Deputies of Chile Resolution of 22 August 1973
