= Eugenio Matte Hurtado =

Chilean politician (1895–1934)

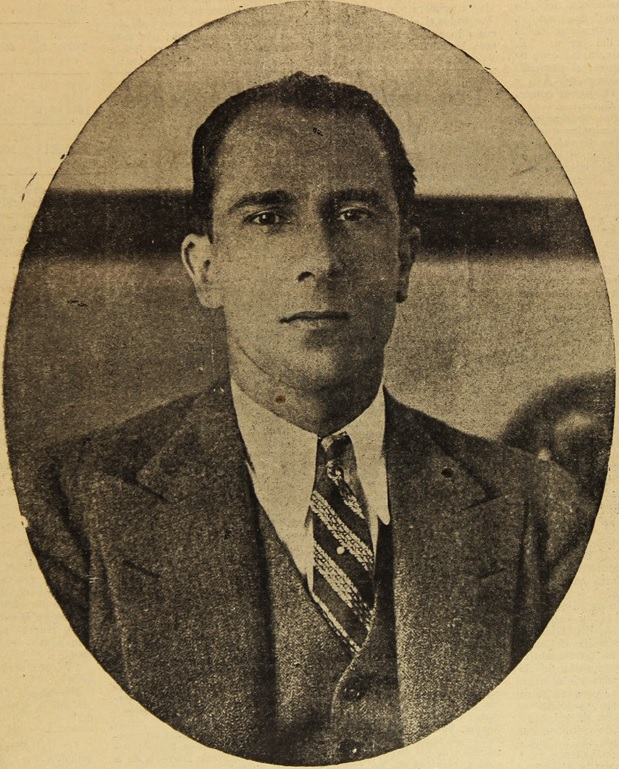

Minister of Interior
- In office June 4, 1932 – June 16, 1932
- Preceded by: Marcial Mora
- Succeeded by: Juan Antonio Ríos

Senator of the Republic of Chile for Santiago
- In office 1931–1932
- Succeeded by: Marmaduke Grove

Personal details
- Born: December 6, 1895 Santiago, Chile
- Died: January 11, 1934 (aged 38) Santiago, Chile
- Party: Liberal Democratic Party; Nueva Acción Pública; Socialist Party of Chile
- Education: University of Chile
- Occupation: Lawyer

Eugenio Matte Hurtado (6 December 1895 – 11 January 1934) was a Chilean lawyer and politician, Grand Master of the Grand Lodge of Chile and a founding member of the Socialist Party of Chile who served as the Minister of Interior of the Socialist Republic of Chile.

== Biography ==
Born in to a middle-class family, he studied law at the University of Chile and settled in Santiago after completing his studies as a lawyer. In 1931 he was exiled to Easter Island by dictator Carlos Ibáñez del Campo for his leftist political activity. After Ibáñez's fall later that year, he was able to return to the Santiago and co-founded the socialist Nueva Acción Pública (New Public Action), with Colonel Marmaduke Grove, among others.

In June 1932, he was involved in the coup that ended the reign of President Juan Esteban Montero. After the coup, he became a member of the Government Junta which proclaimed the Socialist Republic of Chile (República Socialista de Chile) on June 4, 1932. Within the junta, disagreements soon arose between moderate and radical forces, with Matte and Grove clearly belonging to the latter group. The moderate socialist Carlos Dávila, on June 16 with the cooperation of several officers, organized a new coup d'état and had radical junta members, including Matte and Grove, interned on Easter Island. After the fall of the government of President Dávila in September 1932, the transitional regime called elections. Matte, who has since returned from his place of exile, was the only member of the Nueva Acción Pública to be elected to the Senate in those elections.

On April 19, he was one of the founders of the Partido Socialista (Socialist Party). This new socialist party was an association of four socialist groups, including the NAP.

Matte died in 1934 at the age of 38 from a lung disease. His seat in the Senate was filled by Marmaduke Grove.

== Freemasonry ==
Eugenio Matte joined the Grand Lodge of Chile (Gran Logia de Chile) at a young age and was an influential member. He was grandmaster from 1932 to 1933.
