= Bartolomé Blanche =

Chilean military officer (1879–1970)

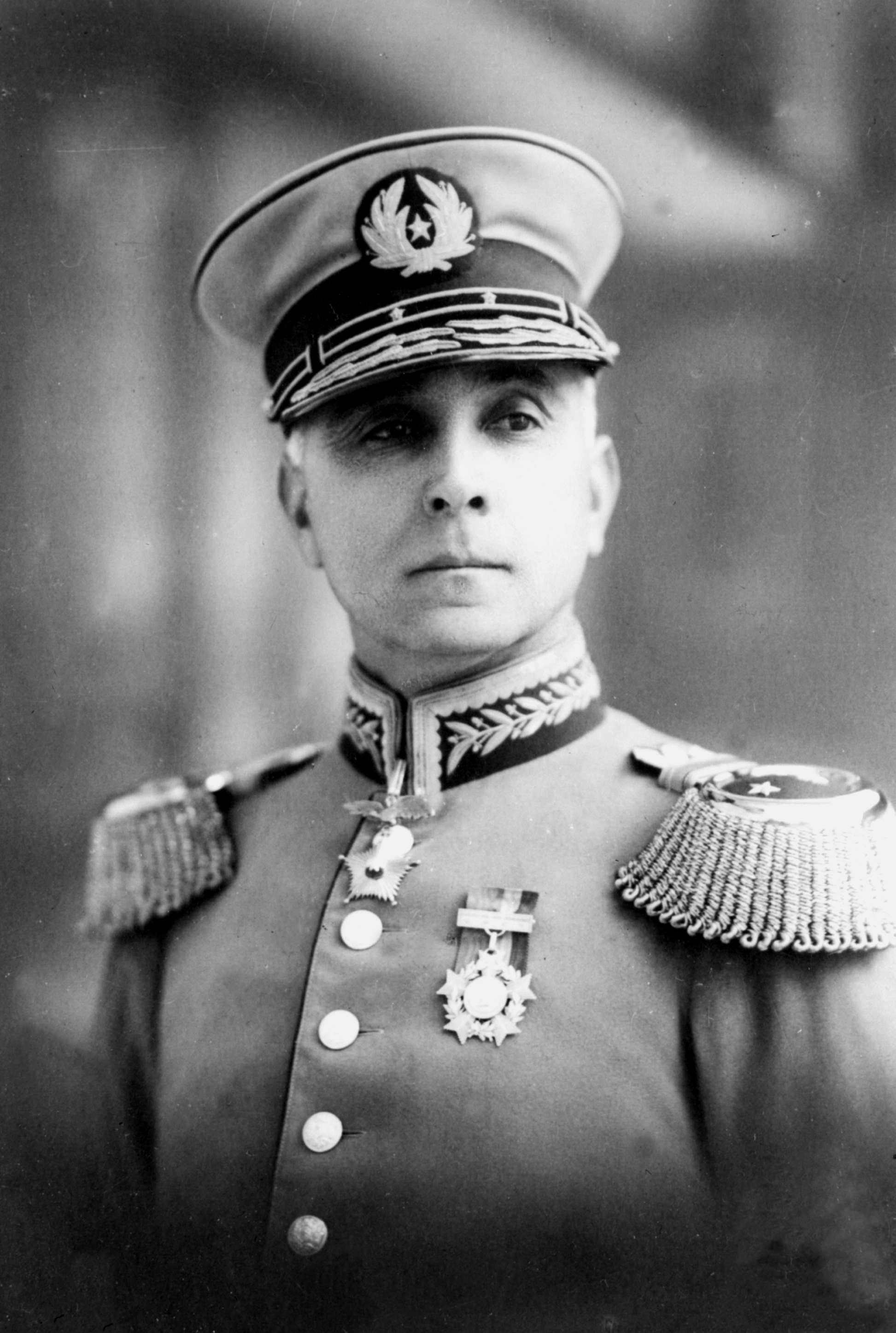

Provisional President of Chile
- In office 13 September 1932 – 2 October 1932
- Preceded by: Carlos Dávila
- Succeeded by: Abraham Oyanedel

Minister of the Interior
- In office 1932–1932
- President: Carlos Dávila (acting)
- Preceded by: Joaquín Fernández
- Succeeded by: Ernesto Barros Jarpa

Commander-in-Chief of the Chilean Army
- In office 27 April 1931 – 4 August 1931
- President: Carlos Ibáñez del Campo; Pedro Opaso; Juan Esteban Montero
- Preceded by: Pedro Charpin
- Succeeded by: Pedro Charpin

Minister of Public Education
- In office 5 August 1930 – 25 October 1930
- President: Carlos Ibáñez del Campo
- Preceded by: Mariano Navarrete
- Succeeded by: Alberto Edwards

Minister of War
- In office 21 June 1927 – 7 November 1930
- President: Carlos Ibáñez del Campo
- Preceded by: Carlos Frödden
- Succeeded by: Pedro Charpin

Personal details
- Born: 6 June 1879 La Serena, Chile
- Died: 10 June 1970 (aged 91) Santiago, Chile
- Military career
- Education: Libertador Bernardo O'Higgins Military School
- Spouse(s): Enriqueta Nothcore (div.); Olga Sepúlveda
- Allegiance: Chile
- Branch: Chilean Army
- Rank: Brigadier general

Bartolomé Guillermo Blanche Espejo (June 6, 1879 – June 10, 1970) was a Chilean military officer and provisional president of Chile in 1932.

He also served as a minister of state, holding the portfolios of Public Education and Defense during the first administration of Carlos Ibáñez del Campo.

== Biography ==
Blanche studied at the secondary school in his native city of La Serena.

In 1895, he entered the Military Academy in Santiago as a cadet. He graduated as a cavalry second lieutenant and was assigned to the Escort Squadron.

=== Military career ===
As a lieutenant, he served at the Military Academy and the Cavalry Application School. Between 1904 and 1905, he was sent by the Chilean Army to Germany to take an equestrian instructor course at the Cavalry School in Hanover, where he graduated first in his class.

Upon returning to Chile, by then holding the rank of captain, he served with the 1st Cavalry Regiment Granaderos. In 1912, he attended the War Academy and, after graduating with the rank of major, was appointed head of the expedition tasked with exploring the Taitao Peninsula. He was subsequently assigned to the 2nd Cavalry Regiment Cazadores.

As a lieutenant colonel, Blanche commanded the 4th Cavalry Regiment Coraceros and the 2nd Cavalry Regiment Cazadores. He was later transferred to the Undersecretariat of War, where he became its head.

== Political career ==
In 1925, while holding the rank of colonel, Blanche was appointed military attaché at the Chilean embassy in France, and was subsequently appointed director-general of the police. After being promoted to brigadier general, he was appointed Minister of War, a position he held until 1930.

In 1932, Blanche was appointed commissioner-general of prices and later served as Minister of the Interior in the provisional government of Carlos Dávila. Following Dávila's resignation, Blanche assumed office as provisional president of the Republic on 13 September of that year. However, a civilist uprising by the military garrisons of Antofagasta and Concepción forced him to resign and hand over power to the president of the Supreme Court of Chile, Abraham Oyanedel.

Blanche died at the Military Hospital in Santiago at 11:30 a.m. on 10 June 1970. His remains were buried in La Serena.
