= September 1924 =

Month of 1924

<<	September 1924					>>
Su	Mo	Tu	We	Th	Fr	Sa
	1	2	3	4	5	6
7	8	9	10	11	12	13
14	15	16	17	18	19	20
21	22	23	24	25	26	27
28	29	30

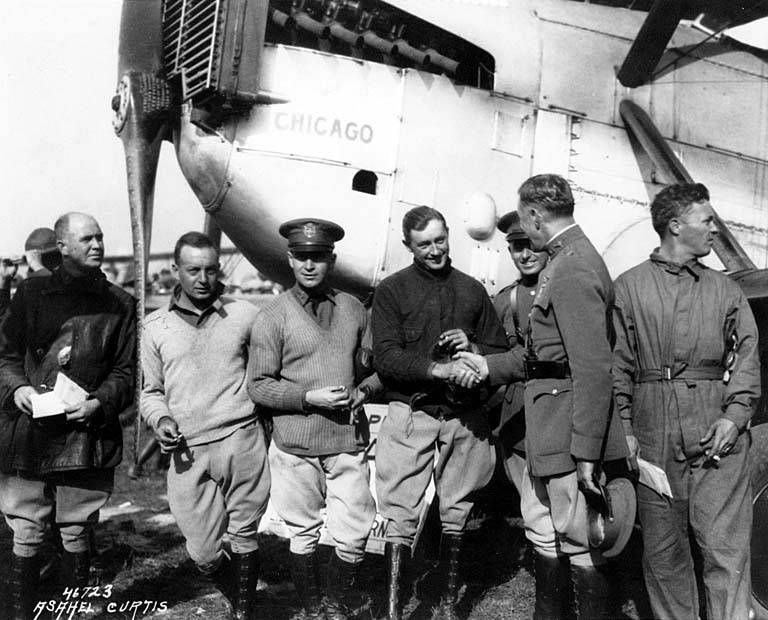
September 28, 1924: U.S. Army Lieutenants Smith, Arnold, Nelson and Harding return to Seattle, become the first persons to fly around the world

The following events occurred in September 1924:

== September 1, 1924 (Monday) ==
- The Dawes Plan, a restructuring of the payment of reparations owed by Germany to the victorious Allied Powers of World War I, went into effect, three days after it was approved by Germany.
- The Russian All-Military Union, composed of remaining members of the White Russian Army that had failed in its attempt to prevent the Communist "Red Army" from controlling Russia, was founded in Yugoslavia by General Pyotr Wrangel in the Serbian town of Sremski Karlovci.
- Joe Boyer, who had won the 1924 Indianapolis 500 in May, was fatally injured at the infamous Altoona Speedway in Altoona, Pennsylvania, after crashing through the rail while attempting to take the lead in the Altoona 250. A year before, the Altoona Speedway 250 race had claimed the life of 1919 Indianapolis winner Howdy Wilcox.
- A hurricane that had stricken the Virgin Islands on August 28 eased, after having killed at least 80 people.
- The film The Side Show of Life, starring Ernest Torrence, was released.
- Born: Francis Clifford Smith, longest serving American prisoner
- Died: Lieutenant General Samuel Baldwin Marks Young, 84, the first Chief of Staff of the United States Army (1903 to 1904)

== September 2, 1924 (Tuesday) ==
- Germany made its first payment of 20 million gold marks under the Dawes Plan.
- Rodolfo Chiari won the presidential election in Panama with 85 percent of the vote over General Manuel Quintero.
- The hit Broadway musical Rose-Marie, with music by Rudolf Friml and Herbert Stothart, and lyrics by Otto Harbach and Oscar Hammerstein II, premiered at the Winter Garden Theatre, for the first of 557 performances. It would run in London for 581 shows and in Paris for 1,250 performances. The play produced the best-selling song "Indian Love Call".
- It was reported from Moscow that a bomb had been found in Lenin's Tomb but that a guard had found it before it could explode.
- Rube Foster, President of baseball's 8-team Negro National League (NNL), announced that the first "Negro World Series" would be played in October between the NNL champion and the champion of the 6-team Eastern Colored League in October.
- Born:
  - Daniel arap Moi, President of Kenya 1978 to 2002; in Sacho, British East Africa (d. 2020)
  - Ramón Valdés, Mexican comedian and film star; in Mexico City (d. 1988)
  - Sidney Phillips, noted World War II veteran who provided information for the Ken Burns 2007 documentary The War; in Mobile, Alabama (d. 2015)
  - Ramón Valdés, Mexican actor; in Mexico City (d. 1988)
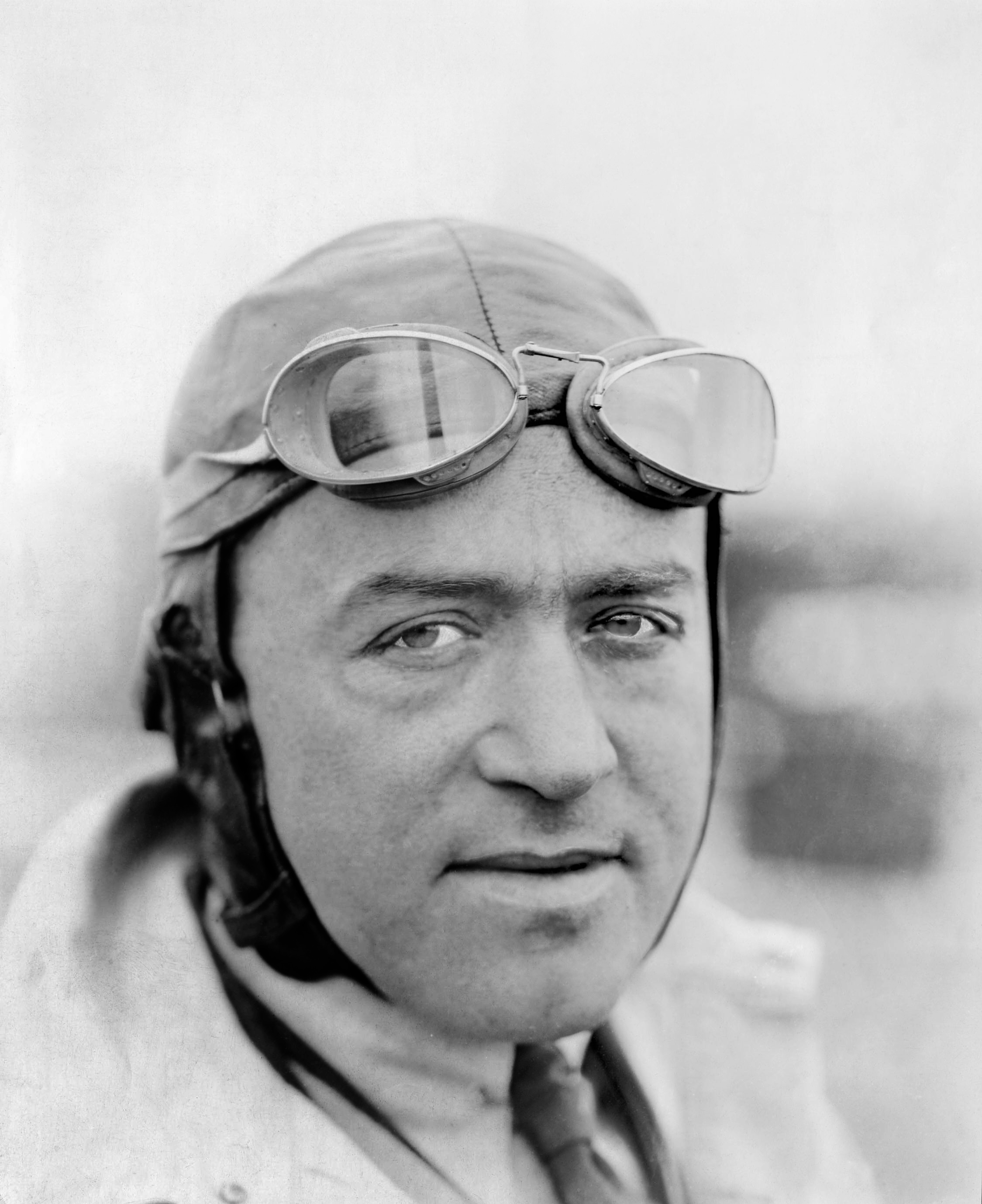
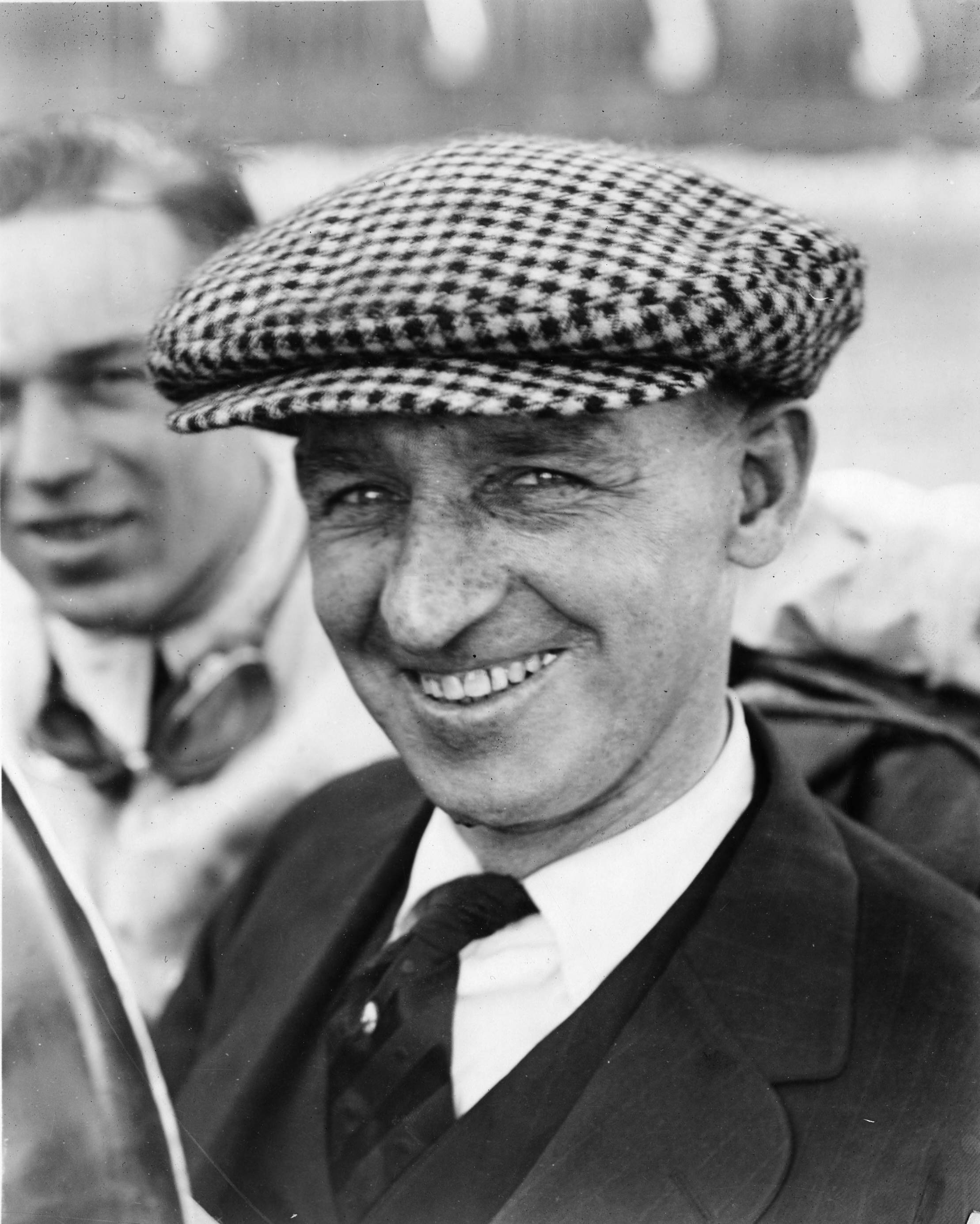
Indianapolis winners Dario Resta (1916) and Joe Boyer (1924)
- Died:
  - Joe Boyer, 34, American auto racer and winner of the 1924 Indianapolis 500, died the day after his car crashed at the Altoona 250 race.
  - Alexander Pearson Jr., 28, U.S. Army Air Service pilot who set the world speed record for an airplane a year earlier, was killed when a wing-strut collapsed on his Curtiss R-8 near Dayton, Ohio while he was practicing for the upcoming Pulitzer race.

== September 3, 1924 (Wednesday) ==
- The Taif massacre of at least 300 civilians was carried out in the Kingdom of Hejaz at the city of Taif, near Mecca, by troops of the Ikhwan, sent by Sultan Ibn Saud of Nejd in the course of the Saudi conquest of Hejaz.
- The "Ruido de sables" (rattling of sabers) incident took place in Chile when a group of 56 young military officers, led by Colonel Marmaduke Grove, loudly rattled their ceremonial sabers within their scabbards in a political protest after they were asked to leave the Chamber of Deputies, which was debating military benefits. "Ruido de sables" became a metaphor in Spanish-speaking nations for a military conspiracy to plot a coup d'état. The event was part of the young officers' response to the Chamber's failure to enact the proposed reforms of President Arturo Alessandri.
- Chinese warlord Qi Xieyuan (referred to in the Western press during his lifetime as Ch'i Hsieh-yuan), governor of the Jiangsu province, went to war against Lu Yongxiang (Lu Yung-hsiang), military governor of the Zhejiang province, beginning the Jiangzu-Zhejiang War within China.
- Born: Mary Grace Canfield, American actress, in Rochester, New York (d. 2014)
- Died:
  - Dario Resta, 42, Italian auto racer and winner of the 1916 Indianapolis 500, was killed instantly at the Brooklands racing circuit in England while trying to set a new land speed record. On the second lap, he suffered a blowout and crashed through a corrugated iron fence.
  - Adam Willis Wagnalls, 80, American publisher and co-founder (with Isaac K. Funk) of the Funk & Wagnalls Company
  - Patrick Mahon, 34, convicted English murderer, was hanged at Wandsworth Prison after he was found guilty of the murder of Emily Kaye.

== September 4, 1924 (Thursday) ==
- British Prime Minister Ramsay MacDonald made a frank speech to the League of Nations Assembly in Geneva, essentially ending further discussion on the proposed "Treaty of Mutual Guarantee" that would replace existing national armies with an international armed force. MacDonald said that history had demonstrated that military alliances were no guarantor of security, and that to provide security, Germany and Russia must be admitted to the League. He added, "If we cannot devise proper arbitration let us go back to competitive armaments and military pacts and prepare for the inevitable next war." As to representatives of small nations he said, "Pact or no pact, you will be invaded, devastated and crushed. You are certain to be the victims of the military age."
- Max Huber was elected as the second president of the Permanent Court of International Justice, commonly called the "World Court" and an attachment to the League of Nations.
- Born:
  - Joan Aiken, English writer of children's fiction best known for The Wolves of Willoughby Chase (in 1962) and its sequels, collectively known as the "Wolves Chronicles"; in Rye, East Sussex (d. 2004)
  - Anita Snellman, Finnish painter; in Helsinki (d. 2006)
- Died: Constance Gordon-Cumming, 87, Scottish travel writer and painter noted for her detailed accounts and illustrations from her world travels

== September 5, 1924 (Friday) ==
- The Trades Union Congress at Hull in England voted to take industrial action to stop war if necessary.
- The three remaining planes of the American round-the-world flyers (Chicago, New Orleans and Boston II) and their two-member crews returned to U.S. airspace and landed near Brunswick, Maine in a dense fog. To complete their journey, they were still required to return to Seattle.
- The same officers who had carried out the "ruido de sables" in Chile on September 3, led by Colonel Marmaduke Grove, entered the office of President Arturo Alessandri and demanded that he dismiss his Interior Minister, as well as to have him pressure the Congtress to enact a labor code, a reformed income tax law, and the raising military salaries. Faced with his overthrow, President Alessandri complied with Grove's demands and appointed General Luis Altamirano as the new Minister of the Interior.
- Evgen Gvaladze, who had attempted an armed rebellion in the Georgian SSR, was arrested by Soviet authorities. Gvaladze was released in March as part of a general amnesty for political prisoners.
- Born: Paul Dietzel, American college football coach who led the 1958 LSU Tigers football team to an undefeated season and the national championship, as determined by the AP and UPI polls; in Fremont, Ohio (d. 2013)

== September 6, 1924 (Saturday) ==
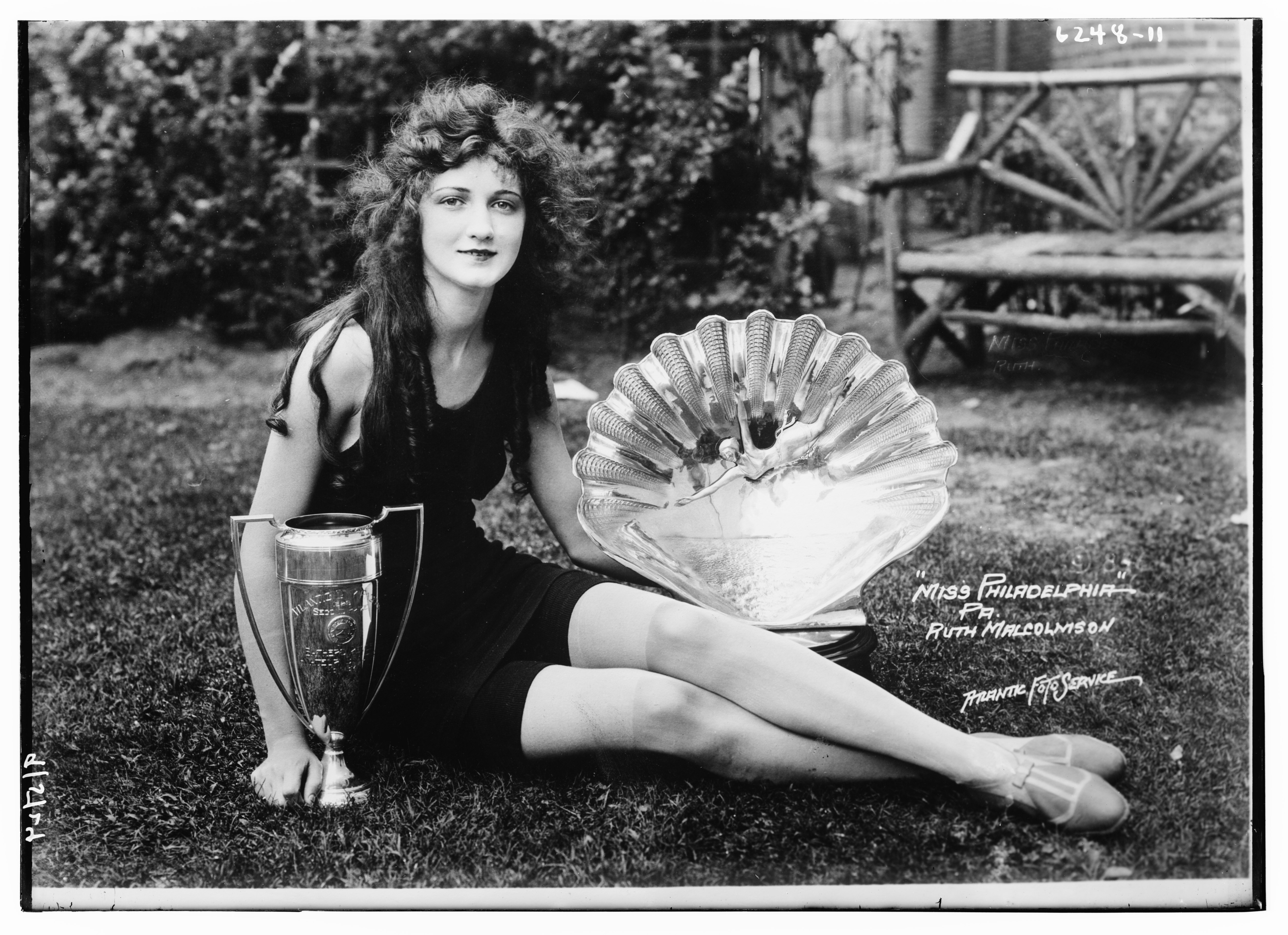
Miss Malcolmson

- The fourth annual Miss America Pageant was held at Atlantic City, New Jersey and won by Miss Philadelphia, Ruth Malcomson (1906—1988). The 1922 and 1923 winner, Mary Katherine Campbell (who had entered from Ohio as Miss Columbus), placed First Runner-Up. The pageant marked the last time that previous winners were eligible to enter the Miss America pageant.
- Chicago's new Soldier Field, referred to at the time as the Grant Park Stadium, held its first public event, admitting 45,000 paying customers to watch the two-day Police Athletic Games, a fundraiser for the Chicago Police Benevolent Association. Events included a chariot race and a game of motorcycle polo.
- John Dillinger made his first attempt at a major crime when he and a friend attempted to rob a grocery store in Mooresville, Indiana. The two were shortly apprehended and sent to jail.
- Born: Babafemi Ogundipe, Nigerian military officer who briefly served as the acting head of government following the kidnapping and assassination of President Johnson Aguiyi-Ironsi; in Ago-Iwoye, Protectorate of Nigeria (d. 1971)
- Died: Archduchess Marie Valerie of Austria, 56, former member of Austro-Hungarian royalty, daughter of the Emperor Franz Joseph I, known for renouncing all rights to the throne in order to marry a fellow Austrian, Archduke Franz Salvator, rather than a member of another dynasty, died of lymphoma.

== September 7, 1924 (Sunday) ==
- Spanish dictator Miguel Primo de Rivera issued a manifesto to the army appealing for an extension of his emergency powers, saying, "One year is too short a time to attempt to carry out the work which lay before the directorio when we assumed power."
- The film Dante's Inferno was released.
- Born:

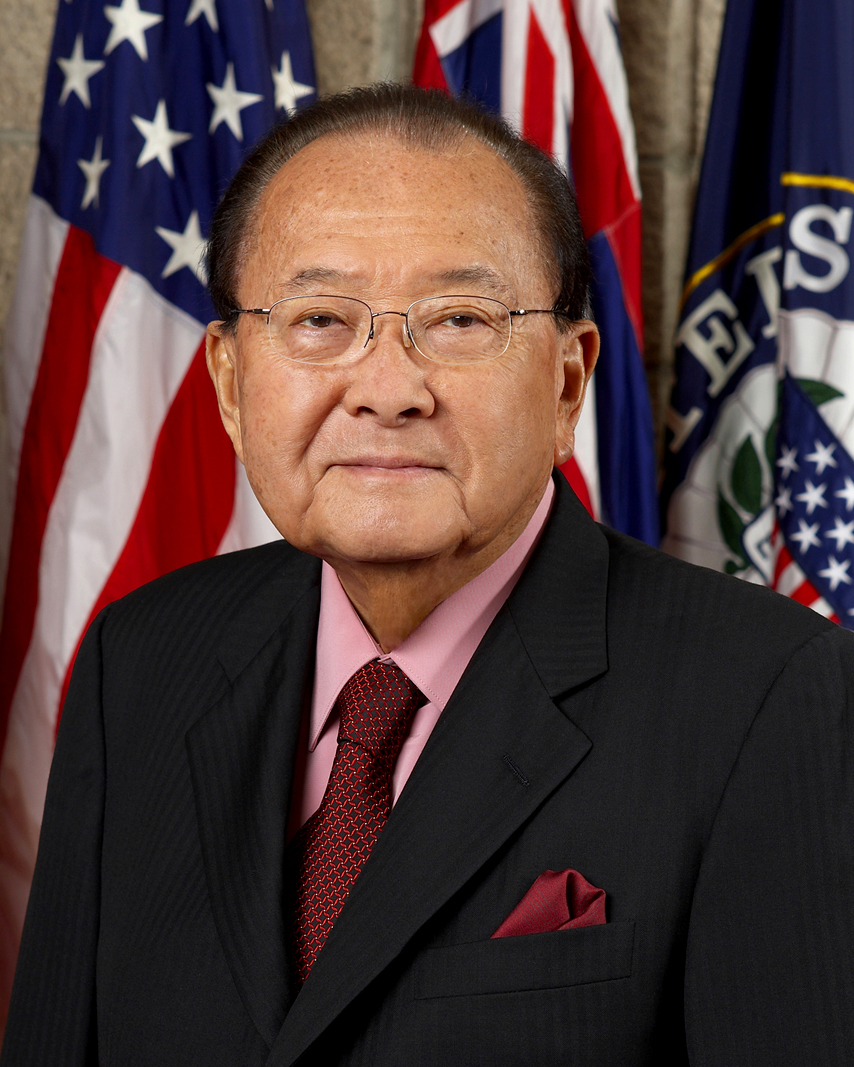
Senator Inouye

  - Daniel Inouye, American politician of Japanese descent and Medal of Honor recipient for heroism in World War II; in Honolulu (d. 2012). Inouye was the first U.S. Representative for Hawaii (1959 to 1963 as the at-large Congressman), U.S. Senator (1963 to 2012), and President pro tempore of the Senate from 2010 to 2012.
  - Eugene R. Folk, American ophthalmologist and specialist in treatment of strabismus (d. 2003)
- Died: Georg von Hantelmann, 25, German fighter pilot and ace with 25 shootdowns during World War I, was killed on his farm in Prussia after confronting trespassers.

== September 8, 1924 (Monday) ==
- The round-the-world flyers landed at Mitchel Field on Long Island, New York. The Prince of Wales was among the crowd that greeted them.
- Born:
  - Mimi Parent, Canadian surrealist artist; in Montreal (d. 2005)
  - Wendell Ford, U.S. Senator for Kentucky for four terms (1974 to 1999), Democratic Party whip from 1991 to 1999, Governor from 1971 to 1974; in Owensboro, Kentucky (d. 2015)
- Died: Archduchess Helena of Austria, 20, six days after her daughter's birth

== September 9, 1924 (Tuesday) ==
- The Hanapepe massacre, a gun battle in the U.S. Territory of Hawaii, killed 20 people, most of them striking Filipino workers at the McBryde sugar plantation on the island of Kauai. After two strikebreakers were taken hostage by armed members of the Higher Wage Movement, Kauai County police intervened. When the fighting ended, four police officers and 16 plantation workers were dead. Afterward, 130 Filipino workers were arrested, 56 of whom received jail sentences, and many of whom were deported back to the Philippines.
- Combat troops from the United States, Great Britain, Japan and Italy were deployed in Shanghai to protect their nations' interests as civil war appeared imminent in China.
- The Kohat Riots, three days of fighting between Muslims against the minority Hindus and Sikhs, began in the town of Kohat in the North-West Frontier Province of British India (now the Khyber Pakhtunkhwa province of Pakistan). After the evacuation of most of the town's 8,000 Hindus and Sikhs to Rawalpindi, 12 Hindus were dead and 13 others missing, and 11 Muslims were confirmed to have been killed.
- The League of Nations began drafting a plan to take over the supervision of Germany's disarmament.
- President Calvin Coolidge waited for four hours in the rain to greet the round-the-world flyers at Bolling Field in Washington, D.C.
- Born:
  - Jane Greer, American film and television actress known for the film noir Out of the Past (1947); in Washington, D.C. (d. 2001)
  - Russell M. Nelson, American religious leader, President of the Church of Jesus Christ of Latter-day Saints 2018-2025; in Salt Lake City, Utah (d. 2025)
  - Rik Van Steenbergen, Belgian cyclist, world champion in the road cycling in 1949, 1956 and 1957; in Arendonk (d. 2003)
- Died: Hermine Hug-Hellmuth, 53, Austrian child psychologist and psychoanalyst, was murdered by her nephew during a home invasion.

== September 10, 1924 (Wednesday) ==
- The Leopold and Loeb trial ended with a sentence of imprisonment for "life plus 99 years" for both Nathan F. Leopold Jr. and Richard Albert Loeb for the May 21 kidnapping and murder of Bobby Franks, instead of the death penalty the state had sought. Loeb would remain at the Illinois State Penitentiary in Joliet, Illinois for the rest of his life, serving a little more than 11 years until being killed by another inmate on January 28, 1936. Leopold lived 35 more years, dying of a diabetes-related heart attack on August 29, 1971.
- The football club Cúcuta Deportivo was founded in Cúcuta, Colombia.
- Born:
  - Irwin Rosten, American documentary filmmaker known for The Incredible Machine (1975); in Brooklyn, New York City; (d. 2010)
  - Ted Kluszewski, American baseball player, 1954 National League home run and RBI leader; in Argo, Illinois (d. 1988)
  - Boyd K. Packer, American Mormon church leader and President of the Church of Jesus Christ of Latter-Day Saints from 2008 to 2015; in Brigham City, Utah (d. 2015). Packer was born the day after his successor, LDS President Russell M. Nelson
  - Njini Ntuta, Zimbabwean Deputy Minister of Mining who was assassinated shortly after being dismissed by President Robert Mugabe; in Tjolotjo, Southern Rhodesia (murdered, 1984)

== September 11, 1924 (Thursday) ==
- Following the forced resignation of Chile's President Arturo Alessandri, the three-member "September Junta", led by General Luis Altamirano, took over the administration of the South American republic, along with Admiral Francisco Nef and General Juan Pablo Bennett. The junta's rule would last only four months before a counter-coup on January 23, 1925.
- At the age of 11, Pengiran Ahmad Tajuddin became the new Sultan of Brunei (at the time a British protectorate) upon the death of his father, the Sultan Jamalul Alam II.
- Born:
  - Tom Landry, American football player and coach known for being head coach of the NFL's Dallas Cowboys for the first 18 seasons of its existence; in Mission, Texas (d. 2000)
  - Rudolf Vrba, Slovak Holocaust survivor known for co-writing (with Alfréd Wetzler) the 1944 Vrba–Wetzler report that provided the first detailed description of the Nazi atrocities in the Auschwitz concentration camp, in Topoľčany, Czechoslovakia (d. 2006)
  - Louisiane Saint Fleurant, Haitian artist; in Petit-Trou-de-Nippes (d. 2005)
- Died: Muhammad Jamalul Alam II, 35, Sultan of Brunei since 1906, died of malaria during an epidemic that claimed the lives of two of his children.

== September 12, 1924 (Friday) ==
- Chilean President Arturo Alessandri fled to Argentina.
- In Italy, Armando Casalini, a Fascist Party member of the Italian Chamber of Deputies, was assassinated by Communist activist Giovanni Corvi to avenge the June 12 assassination of Socialist Party deputy Giacomo Matteotti. The shooting, combined with the June 26 walkout of opposition deputies, would serve as a pretext for a Fascist position.
- The Nestorian rebellion, a second uprising by the Assyrian people in southeastern Turkey, began.

== September 13, 1924 (Saturday) ==
- A 6.8 magnitude earthquake killed 60 people in and around the city of Pasinler in northeastern Turkey.
- General of the Armies John J. Pershing, the last American military officer to achieve the rank of a six-star general, and the Chief of Staff of the U.S. Army since 1921, retired from the United States Army upon reaching the age of 64 (as required by Department of War regulations at the time) and was granted full pay and allowances for the rest of his life, as well as continued use of his office at the SWAN Building in Washington that served as the headquarters of the Department of State, the Department of War and the Department of the Navy. Pershing was succeeded as Army Chief of Staff by Major General John L. Hines.
- French general Jean Degoutte allowed all functionaries and other public employees ousted or deported from the Ruhr since the occupation began to return to work.
- The 1924 International Lawn Tennis Challenge, now called the Davis Cup, which had started in May with challengers from 22 nations, finished with the United States (Bill Tilden defeating Australia in all five matches.
- The hoax of the "Tucson artifacts" began as a family in the U.S. state of Arizona reported finding the first of 31 lead objects, including swords, crosses and ceremonial objects with dates written upon them in Roman numerals, corresponding to the years ranging from 47 A.D. to 157 A.D., with an inscription on one object that seemed to be evidence of settlers who had come to North America from the Roman Empire, founding a settlement called "Calalus".
- The Court Treatt Expedition began in Cape Town (in South Africa) as an attempt by British Army Major Court Treatt and his wife Stella to drive across Africa to Cairo (in Egypt).
- Born:
  - Maurice Jarre, French composer known primarily for his creation of film scores for major motion pictures including Lawrence of Arabia (1962) and Ghost (1990) winner of four Golden Globes and a Grammy Award; in Lyon (d. 2009)
  - Douglas Gamley, Australian composer known for the film scores for Australian, British and American films including Tom Thumb (1958) and The Land That Time Forgot (1974); in Melbourne (d. 1998)
  - Ruth Jean Baskerville Bowen, the first female African-American talent agent; in Danville, Virginia (d. 2009)
- Died: Bhupendra Nath Bose, 65, Indian politician who served in the Bengal Legislative Assembly from 1904 to 1910, and later as President of the Indian National Congress during the year 1914

== September 14, 1924 (Sunday) ==
- A helicopter designed by Étienne Oehmichen lifted a 400-pound cargo 1 meter and 10 centimeters off the ground, winning a prize offered by the French government.
- In the championship game of the highest level of competition in the Gaelic Athletic Association in the sport of hurling, the inter-county tournament, Galway GAA defeated Limerick GAA, 7–3 to 4–5, equivalent to a 24 to 17 win based on three-point goals and single points for scores above the goal post.
- High Point University opened as High Point College. Located in the town of High Point, North Carolina, the private Methodist college had an initial enrollment of 122 students, taught by nine faculty members. It would be redesignated as a university in 1991 upon offering a master's degree program.
- The lost film The Alaskan, a Paramount studios movie starring Thomas Meighan, Estelle Taylor and Anna Mae Wong premiered in New York City. The production was filmed on location in the U.S. Territory of Alaska, and the Chinese-born Miss Wong played the role of an Eskimo.
- Born: Davidson Nicol, Sierra Leone physician and diabetes researcher known for his discoveries in analyzing the breakdown of insulin in the human body, as wells as being Sierra Leone's first ambassador to the United Nations (1969 to 1971); in Freetown, Sierra Leone (d. 1994)

== September 15, 1924 (Monday) ==
- The Second Zhili–Fengtian War began in northeastern China between the Japanese-supported Manchurian forces led by Zhang Zuolin in the Fengtian Province (now Liaoning province), attacking the city of Ch'in-Huang-Tao (Qinhuangdao) in the Zhili province (now Hebei province) led by Wu Peifu. After six weeks, the war was over with Zhang's forces having taken control of Zhili province, along with Jiangsu, Jiangxi and Hubei provinces.
- The Saks Fifth Avenue luxury department store was opened by Horace Saks and Bernard Gimbel at the newly completed Saks building at 611 Fifth Avenue.
- German astronomer Friedrich Simon Archenhold said that he saw what he believed to be an attempt by inhabitants of Mars to contact Earth. "I cannot disclose everything I saw", Archenhold stated. "I am a scientist and I am not seeking newspaper sensations, but this much I will say – I was thunderstruck by what I saw. I could not believe my eyes. I thought perhaps my sons had climbed on the observatory roof and had planted something in the telescope, but it was not so. I am now going to Jungfrau, Milan, and other observatories to discuss my findings with other scientists seeking an answer to the question of whether there is life on Mars."
- The German government decided to postpone any attempt to join the League of Nations until the next year.
- The round-the-world flyers arrived in Chicago, conducting a fly-over of the city escorted by a dozen army planes.
- Born: Bobby Short, cabaret singer and pianist, in Danville, Illinois (d. 2005)
- Died: Frank Chance, 48, American baseball player immortalized (along with Joe Tinker and Johnny Evers) in the phrase "Tinker-to-Evers-to-Chance" in the Franklin Pierce Adams poem Baseball's Sad Lexicon", later an inductee in the Baseball Hall of Fame

== September 16, 1924 (Tuesday) ==
- Jim Bottomley of the St. Louis Cardinals set a new major league baseball record for RBIs in a single game with 12, during a 17–3 win over the Brooklyn Robins. The record was tied by Mark Whiten in 1993 but has never been broken.

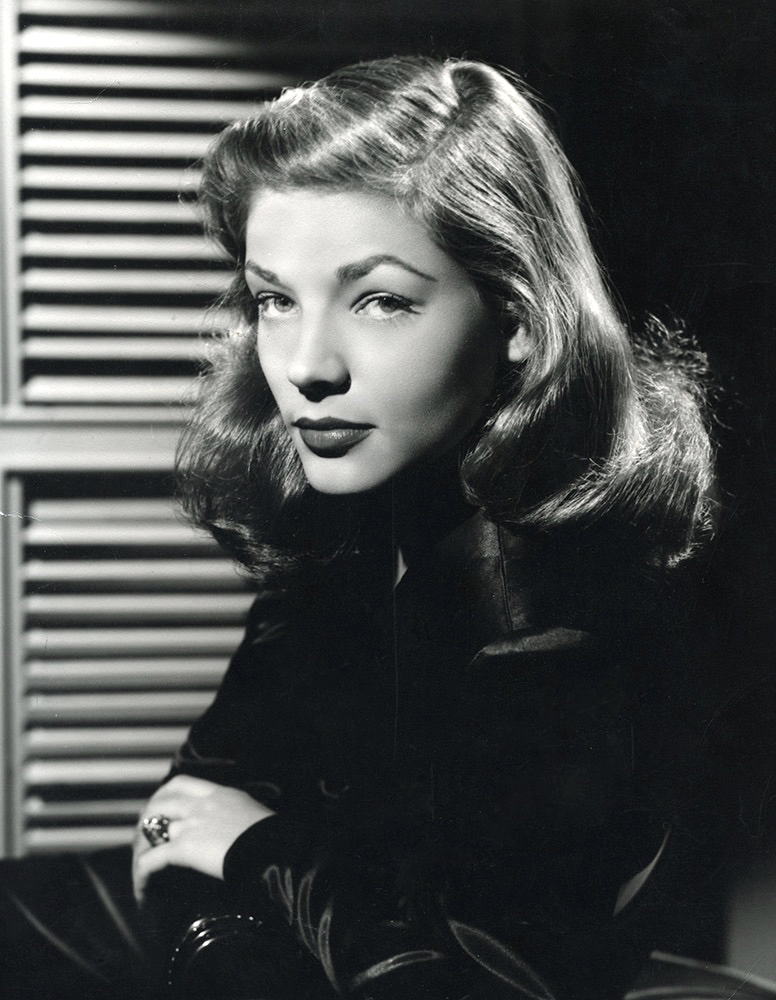
Lauren Bacall in 1945

- Born:
  - Lauren Bacall, American film, stage and television actress; known for the films The Big Sleep (1946), Dark Passage (1947) and Key Largo (1948) as co-star with Humphrey Bogart, and later for The Mirror Has Two Faces (1996), as well as for the stage musicals Applause (1970) and Woman of the Year; in the Bronx, New York (d. 2014)
  - Bhichai Rattakul, Deputy Prime Minister of Thailand, 1983 to 1990 and 1997 to 2000, later the World President of the service club Rotary International, 2002–2004; in Bangkok, Kingdom of Siam (d. 2022)
- Died: Arabella Huntington, 74, American philanthropist who was, in 1900, the wealthiest woman in the U.S. after the death of her husband

== September 17, 1924 (Wednesday) ==
- Julian Byng, the Governor General of Canada, issued an order mandating the termination of the Six Nations Confederacy Council of the Iroquois, made up of the hereditary chiefs for the Mohawk, Cayuga, Onondaga, Oneida, Seneca and Tuscarora tribes within the Six Nations Reserve in the province of Ontario. Pursuant to Canada's Indian Act, Viscount Byng directed that the Six Nations Council be replaced by an elective body. The decision came after the Iroquois Confederacy Chief Deskaheh had attempted to bring concerns of the Six Nations to the attention of the League of Nations.
- Poland's Border Protection Corps (Korpus Ochrony Pogranicza or KOP) was created to protect the nation's eastern boundaries from potential invasion by the Soviet Union and from bandits crossing the border from the U.S.S.R, with six battalions and five regiments.
- In a ceremony, U.S. President Calvin Coolidge gave a signal from his desk in the White House to initiate the generation of power from the Skagit River Hydroelectric Project, in the U.S. state of Washington.
- Prince Wolfgang of Hesse married Princess Marie Alexandra of Baden over the objections of Wolfgang's uncle, the former German Kaiser Wilhelm II.
- Born: Gerd Thoreid, Norwegian stand-up comedian who performed under her stage name of "GT-Sara" and who began her comedy career at the age of 50 and performed until age 90; in Furnes (d. 2020)
- Died: John Martin Schaeberle, 71, German-born American astronomer known for his development of a camera to take photos of the Sun and its corona during solar eclipses, and for his discovery that Procyon is actually part of a binary star system with a faint companion designated Procyon B

== September 18, 1924 (Thursday) ==
- The U.S. military occupation of the Dominican Republic came to an end after more than eight years. Since May 5, 1916, when the U.S. Marines had arrived to maintain order while the Caribbean nation's customs revenues were taken control of by the American government in order for the Dominican Republic to pay its debts. Upon completing its withdrawal after three months, the U.S. Marines turned over police power to the Dominican Republic National Police Force.
- The Mahatma Gandhi began a 21-day fast of despair over the recent riots between Hindus and Muslims.
- At the Rivoli Theater in Manhattan, audiences were first shown pre-recorded sound films of the major candidates in the 1924 U.S. presidential election, listening to addresses by Republican president Calvin Coolidge, Democratic candidate John W. Davis and Progressive candidate Robert M. La Follette.
- Born:
  - Jean Lindenmann, Yugoslavia-born Swiss immunologist and co-discoverer (with Alick Isaacs) of interferon; in Zagreb (d. 2015)
  - Neville Chittick, British archaeologist; in Hove, East Sussex (d. 1984)
  - Bob C. Riley, U.S. politician who was the first blind person to serve as the governor of a U.S. state; in Little Rock, Arkansas. From January 3 to January 12, 1974, Riley, who had lost his sight when he was wounded in World War II, and who been Lieutenant Governor since 1971, served as Governor of Arkansas for the remainder of the term of Dale Bumpers, who had resigned on January 3 to be sworn in as a U.S. Senator (d. 1994).
  - J. D. Tippit, American police officer who was shot and killed on November 22, 1963, while questioning Lee Harvey Oswald as a suspect in the assassination of President John F. Kennedy; in Annona, Texas (murdered, 1963)
- Died: George Walker, English-born South African prospector who discovered the gold deposits of Witwatersrand in 1886, but received no credit for his discovery, died in poverty at the age of 71.

== September 19, 1924 (Friday) ==
- Alexander Krasnoshchyokov, Soviet Communist politician and the former party leader in the Far Eastern Republic, became the first prominent Bolshevik and ally of the late Vladimir Lenin to be arrested by the government on order of Joseph Stalin. Convicted on charges of corruption, Krasnoshchyokov would be released four months later and be allowed to rejoin the Soviet government in the autumn of 1925, though eventually losing favor again with Stalin and being executed in 1937.
- The Bukhara People's Soviet Republic, with a capital at Bukhara, was established by Uzbek, Tajik and Russian Communists in what is now Uzbekistan, and applied to be admitted to the Soviet Union. It would exist for less than six weeks.
- Born:
  - Don Harron, Canadian comedian and actor, known for bringing his Canadian TV character Charlie Farquharson to the U.S. country music and comedy show Hee Haw; in Toronto (d. 2015)
  - Suchitra Mitra, Indian singer, in Gujhandi, Bengal Province British India (now in the state of Bihar) (d. 2011)
- Died:
  - Alick Bannerman, 70, Australian cricketer who played in 28 Test matches from 1879 to 1893
  - William Verner Longe, 67, English painter known for his paintings of horses and horse racing

== September 20, 1924 (Saturday) ==
- A secret agreement was made by the Republic of China and the Soviet Union, following up on an equally-secret protocol on March 14. The Chinese had made a bargain with the Soviets that all former conventions, treaties, protocols, contracts, and documents between the Soviet and China would be annulled until a conference could convene between the two nations.
- Chicago Cubs pitcher Grover Cleveland Alexander won the 300th game of his career, pitching all 12 innings of a 7–3 win over the New York Giants.
- The Nuns of the Battlefield monument by Jerome Connor was dedicated in Washington, D.C.
- Born:
  - Akkineni Nageswara Rao, Indian actor who appeared in hundreds of Telugu cinema films in a 75-year career; in Rampuram, Madras Province, British India (now in Andhra Pradesh state) (d. 2014)
  - James Galanos, American fashion designer; in Philadelphia (d. 2016)
  - Hermann Buhl, Austrian mountaineer noted for making the first ascents of 26,660 feet (8,130 m) high Nanga Parbat (in 1953) and 26,414 feet (8,051 m) Broad Peak (in 1957); in Innsbruck (killed in climbing accident, 1957)
  - Vinod Kinariwala, Indian activist and martyr in the cause of independence; in Ahmedabad, Bombay Province, British India (now in Gujarat state (shot and killed, 1942)

== September 21, 1924 (Sunday) ==
- The Autostrada, the world's first divided highway, opened to motor traffic in Italy. An improvement to existing limited-access roads, the Autostrada had only one lane in each direction and no exits along its high-speed 42.6 kilometres (26.5 mi) route between Milan and Varese.
- In Sweden, three days of voting concluded for the 230 seats of the lower house (andra kammares) of the Riksdag. The Social Democrat Workers Party (Socialdemokratiska arbetareparti), led by former Prime Minister Hjalmar Branting, increased its plurality to 104 seats, still 12 short of a majority.
- Spanish Army Lieutenant Colonel Francisco Franco, angry with the plans of Prime Minister Miguel Primo de Rivera to pull back troops fighting the Rif War in Morocco, approached General Gonzalo Queipo de Llano and proposed that he lead a coup d'état to overthrow the premier. The General declined the suggestion, and Franco postponed his plans to lead a right-wing revolution against the Spanish government.
- U.S. President Calvin Coolidge condemned socialism in a speech in Washington made during the closing exercises of a convention of the Society of the Holy Name. "Socialism and communism cannot be reconciled with the principles which our institutions represent", Coolidge said in a statement interpreted as a criticism of rival presidential candidate Robert M. La Follette. "They are entirely foreign, entirely un-American. We stand wholly committed to the policy that what the individual produces belongs entirely to him to be used to the benefit of himself, to provide for his own family and to enable him to serve his fellow man."
- The action film Roaring Rails, starring Harry Carey, was released.
- The rugby union club FC Barcelona Rugby was formed in Spain.

== September 22, 1924 (Monday) ==
- The Woolworths Group of Australia (unrelated to the F. W. Woolworth Company chain of five-and-dime stores in the U.S. and the UK), owner of the Woolworths grocery store chain and the Big W department stores, was founded in Sydney by five entrepreneurs.
- The sinking of the American freighter SS Clifton in Lake Huron drowned all 26 of its crew. The ship had departed Sturgeon Bay, Wisconsin, the day before with a cargo of crushed stone, bound for Detroit. Its wreckage would be found more than 90 years later in 2016.
- In an unprecedented three-cushion billiards match between the world champions of balkline (Willie Hoppe) and straight pool (Ralph Greenleaf), both of the U.S., Hoppe won, 600 to 527.
- In Vienna, the first public performance was made of "Piano Concerto for the Left Hand", written by Erich Wolfgang Korngold. Austrian pianist Paul Wittgenstein, who had lost his left arm during World War I, commissioned the writing of the three-section piece and gave its first public performance.
- The 19-story Roosevelt Hotel opened in 45 East 45th Street in Manhattan. Located near Grand Central Station, the hotel had 1,025 rooms, as well as services such as child care, a kennel, and an in-house physician.
- Born:
  - Rosamunde Pilcher, Cornish British novelist known for her bestseller The Shell Seekers; she also wrote under the pen name Jane Fraser; in Lelant, Cornwall (d. 2019)
  - Gerald Schoenfeld, U.S. theater owner and chairman of the Shubert Organization and its 17 Broadway theaters; in New York City (d. 2008)
  - Norvel Lee, African-American light heavyweight boxer and Tuskegee Airman, and 1952 Olympic gold medalist; in Eagle Rock, Virginia (d. 1992)
  - Charles Keeping, English illustrator and author; in Lambeth, London (d. 1988)
- Died: Sir Maung Khin, 52, the first native-born judge of the Chief Court of Lower Burma, and the first Burmese citizen to be knighted by the British monarchy.

== September 23, 1924 (Tuesday) ==
- Voting was held in Denmark for 28 of the 76 seats of the Landstinget, the upper house of the nation's parliament, the Rigsdag. While Venstre retained a plurality (31 seats) after the vote, and the Socialdemokratiet of Prime Minister Thorvald Stauning were in second place, Stauning's party retained control of the lower house, the Folketing, for which elections had been held for on April 11.
- The German cabinet announced its decision to work towards entering the League of Nations as "a great power having equal rights with other great powers."
- Born:
  - Fereydoon Hoveyda, the last ambassador to the United Nations for the Kingdom of Iran; in Damascus, Mandate for Syria and the Lebanon (d. 2006)
  - Aroti Dutt, Indian social worker and women's rights advocate who served as president of the Associated Country Women of the World organization from 1965 to 1971; in Calcutta (d. 2003)

== September 24, 1924 (Wednesday) ==
- The Indian civil rights organization Samata Sainik Dal was founded by B. R. Ambedkar with a mission of "safeguarding the rights of all oppressed sections of Indian society."
- The Tamil language newspaper Tamil Nesan published its first issue. Aimed at ethnic Indians in British Malaya, and later for Malaysia, Tamil Nesan was notable for its duration. It would continue for more than 74 years before ceasing publication in 2019.
- Sculptor Gutzon Borglum arrived in the U.S. state of South Dakota at the invitation of Doane Robinson to carry out plans to carve a statue of four American presidents in the state's Black Hills. Borglum's first choice of sites was the 150 feet (46 m) tall granite pillars known as The Needles, but soon decided that the eroding, fragile rock formation could not support carving. After considering, and rejecting, Black Elk Peak, Borglum would eventually settle on Mount Rushmore.
- Dazzy Vance of the Brooklyn Robins became only the sixth pitcher in major-league history to throw an immaculate inning, striking out all three batters on nine total pitches in the third inning of a 6–5 win over the Chicago Cubs.
- The experimental short film Ballet Mécanique, directed by Fernand Léger and Dudley Murphy with a musical score by George Antheil, premiered in Vienna.
- Born: Nina Bocharova, Soviet/Ukrainian gymnast (d. 2020)

== September 25, 1924 (Thursday) ==
- English motorist Malcolm Campbell set a new land speed record at Pendine Sands in Wales with a speed of 146.16 mph (235.22 km/h) in a Sunbeam 350HP.
- The five-story tall Leifeng Pagoda at Hangzhou in China collapsed suddenly, almost 950 years after its completion in the year 975. In 1999, building of an identical pagoda on the ruins of the old one would begin, opening on October 25, 2002.
- Born: A. B. Bardhan (Arhendu Bhushan Bardhan), Indian trade union leader and former General Secretary of the Communist Party of India (1996 to 2012); in Barisal, Bengal Presidency, British India (now Bangladesh) (d. 2016)
- Died: Lotta Crabtree (Charlotte Mignon Crabtree), 76, popular American stage actress, comedian and philanthropist, later profiled in the 1951 film Golden Girl

== September 26, 1924 (Friday) ==
- The Delhi newspaper Hindustan Times, the second-highest circulating English language newspaper in India and the first to be owned by an Indian family, published its first issue. The paper was founded by independence activist Sunder Singh Lyallpuri, a leader of the Akali movement.
- Flooding killed 30 people in Leningrad.
- Spanish Army General Joaquín Milans del Bosch, the former Captain General of Catalonia by was appointed as the Civil Governor of Barcelona by Prime Minister Miguel Primo de Rivera, and began a campaign against the Catalan ethnic group within Catalonia.
- Born:
  - Jean Hoerni, Swiss-born electrical engineer who helped in the development of the transistor, and co-founded the Fairchild Semiconductor company; in Geneva (d. 1997)
  - Ozzie Cadena, American record producer; in Oklahoma City, Oklahoma (d. 2008)
- Died:
  - Andrew Preston, 78, American businessman and fruit seller who co-founded the Boston Fruit Company and later the United Fruit Company, and popularized the banana in the United States
  - Walter Long, 1st Viscount Long, 70, British politician who served as Secretary of State for the Colonies 1916–1919, and First Lord of the Admiralty 1919 to 1921

== September 27, 1924 (Saturday) ==
- As China's Fengtiang province was on the verge of losing the Zhili–Fengtian War that Fengtian's leader Zhang Zuolin had started on September 15, Governor Zheng Shiqi of the Anhui province telegraphed China's President Cao Kun for aid. Cao Kun sent 250,000 troops to Manchuria to resist the Fengtian troops, although the additional aid failed to prevent the Fengtian takeover.
- British Prime Minister Ramsay MacDonald told a gathering in Derby that his government had secured many valuable concessions in its treaties with the Soviet Union and if the House of Commons failed to ratify them, he would send the country to another general election.
- Essendon FC (2–0–0) played against Richmond Tigers (1–0–1) in the final championship series of a round robin tournament between the four Victorian Football League finalists (Essendon, Richmond, Fitzroy Maroons and South Melbourne FC). Despite losing to Richmond, 73 to 86, Essendon won the championship of the tournament. While both teams had finished with records of 2 wins and 1 loss (for 8 points in the standings, based on four for a win and one for a tie), and Richmond had beaten Essendon, the winner was declared based on the ratio of points for against points against. In its first two games, Essendon had scored 130 against 57 for the opposition, while Richmond had 141 against 133. To gain the crown, Richmond would have had to score 66 points more than Essendon in their match. While the tournament winner would normally have played the Grand Final against the team that ended the regular season in first place, Essendon had finished first, so no grand final was played.
- The New York Giants clinched the National League pennant with a 5–1 win over the Philadelphia Phillies.
- The auto racing team of driver Kenelm Lee Guinness and riding mechanic Tom Barrett crashed at the San Sebastián Grand Prix in Spain. Barrett was killed, and Guinness was seriously injured and would never return to racing.

== September 28, 1924 (Sunday) ==
- The four remaining American aviators in the round-the-world flight expedition completed their journey by landing at Sand Point in Seattle in the airplanes Chicago (with pilot Lowell H. Smith and co-pilot Leslie P. Arnold) and New Orleans (with pilot Erik H. Nelson and co-pilot John Harding Jr), all four of whom were U.S. Army lieutenants. Four planes (with 8 total crew) had departed from Sand Point on April 6. Including stops for rest and maintenance, the trip took 175 days and covered 27,553 miles (44,342 km). Time 363 hours and 7 minutes.
- The Cecil B. DeMille-directed film Feet of Clay was released.
- The Nestorian rebellion ended.

== September 29, 1924 (Monday) ==
- The Politis–Kalfov Protocol was signed at the League of Nations in Geneva following the Tarlis incident of July 27, when 17 Bulgarian peasants were killed by a Greek soldier. Greece's ambassador to the League, Nikolaos Politis, and Bulgaria's Foreign Minister Hristo Kalkov, signed the protocol, with Greece agreeing to protect its Bulgarian-Greek minority and even to sponsor schools for Bulgarian-Greek students. The Greek Parliament, however, never ratified the treaty.
- The Dominican Republic was admitted to the League of Nations.
- The Washington Senators clinched their first American League pennant in franchise history with a 4–2 win over the Boston Red Sox.
- Italy's Fascist Premier Benito Mussolini announced plans to build the world's highest skyscraper in Rome. Italian architect Mario Palanti proposed a 1,500-foot (460 m) high pyramidal structure with 4,500 rooms, featuring a concert hall and a huge gymnasium for the training of Olympic athletes.

== September 30, 1924 (Tuesday) ==
- The Allied Powers relaxed controls on the German Navy in light of improved international relations.
- The League of Nations appointed a commission to look into the Mosul Question.
- The German romance film Comedy of the Heart was released.
- Born:
  - Truman Capote, writer known for Breakfast at Tiffany's (1958) and In Cold Blood (1966); in New Orleans, Louisiana (d. 1984)
  - Syed Hassan, Indian educator and humanitarian, founder of the INSAN schools; in Jehanabad, Bengal Province, British India (now in the state of Bihar) (d. 2016)
