= Eulogio Altamirano =

Chilean politician

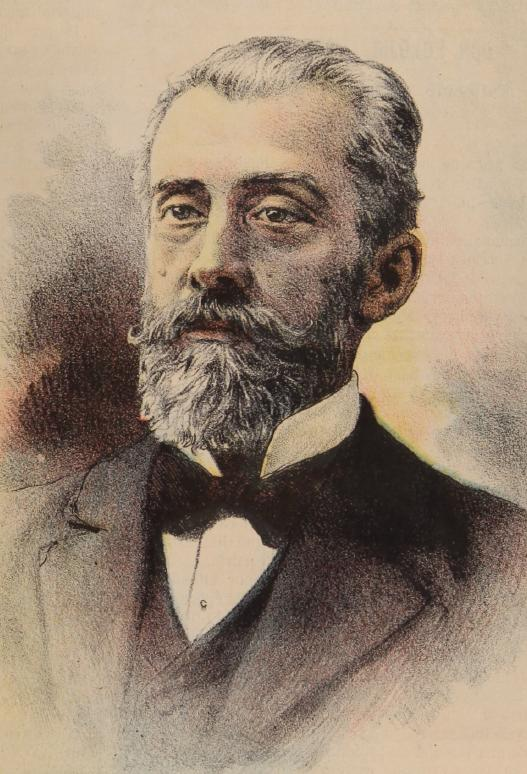

Minister of War and Navy
- In office September 11, 1875 – October 11, 1875
- Preceded by: Mariano Sánchez
- Succeeded by: Ignacio Zenteno
- In office September 18, 1871 – September 28, 1871
- Preceded by: José Ramón Lira
- Succeeded by: Aníbal Pinto

Minister of the Interior
- In office September 18, 1871 – September 18, 1876
- Preceded by: Belisario Prats
- Succeeded by: José Victorino Lastarria

Minister of Justice and Public Instruction
- In office 1870–1871
- Preceded by: Francisco Vargas
- Succeeded by: Abdón Cifuentes

Personal details
- Born: August 1, 1835 San Felipe, Chile
- Died: March 17, 1903 (Note: According to the Library of the National Congress of Chile, his year of death was 1905.) Santiago, Chile
- Education: Instituto Nacional

Pedro Eulogio Altamirano Aracena (August 1, 1835 – March 17, 1903), was a Chilean soldier, lawyer and politician.

== Early life ==
He was the son of Manuel Altamirano and Pilar Aracena. He graduated as a lawyer in 1860. His studies were carried out at the Liceo de San Felipe; National Institute since 1852; Law courses at the National Institute and was sworn in as a lawyer on August 11, 1859.

Married to Adelina Talavera Appleby, with whom he was the father of General Luis Altamirano Talavera, who would carry out a military coup in 1925 against the presidency of Arturo Alessandri Palma and would present himself to Chile as de facto president. In his second marriage, he married Teresa Talavera Appleby, sister of the previous one; and then married for the third time, to Elena Talavera Appleby, sister of his previous wives; they had two children.

== Judicial career ==
In May 1865 he was appointed criminal judge of Valparaíso and in April 1869 criminal judge of Santiago. On August 2, 1870, he was appointed Minister of Justice, Worship and Public Instruction.

He was also appointed Minister of the Interior throughout the period of President Federico Errázuriz Zañartu (1871-1876).

== Politician career ==
On September 18, 1871, he held the position of Minister of the Interior and Foreign Affairs, replacing the Minister of War and Navy on the same date.

In 1873 he was elected deputy for Concepción and Talcahuano for the Conservative Party. He replaced the Minister of War and Navy (1875). He was appointed Mayor of Valparaíso and General Commander of the Navy (1876).

Senator of the Republic in 1876, for the province of Concepción, he held the position until 1882. In 1880 he was appointed minister plenipotentiary and secretary of the army in the campaign (War of the Pacific). He participated as a representative of Chile in the failed Arica Conference in October 1880 that was to end the war. He carried out the Lima campaign and found himself in the battles of Chorrillos and Miraflores (1881).

In March 1884 he was appointed the first Director of the State Railway Company, this position being created on January 4 of the same year. He held this position for one year.

In 1885 he returned to the Senate, this time representing the province of Valparaíso, a position from which he left in 1894. He opposed the government of José Manuel Balmaceda in the Civil War of 1891. After the triumph of the revolution, he maintained his position as senator.

In 1894 he was appointed Mayor of Valparaíso. His actions were overshadowed by the murder of the liberal journalist and editor of the newspaper El Comercio de Valparaíso, Rodolfo León Lavín, an event that occurred while he was mayor of the province. He did not order that a process be instituted, nor did he make the communication to the Courts of Justice known in a public document. He did not take any punitive measures.

Altamirano had been appointed Defender of Minors in 1890, and, after the 1891 conflict, he continued his duties, remaining this position until his death on March 17, 1903.

== Notes ==
Political offices
Preceded by -	Intendant of Valparaíso Province; 1891–1894	Succeeded by -
Preceded by Juan de Dios Arlegui	Senator for Valparaíso Province; 1885–1894	Succeeded by Juan José Latorre
Preceded by Aníbal Pinto	Senator for Concepción Province; 1876–1882	Succeeded by Waldo Silva
Preceded by Mariano Sánchez Fontecilla; Ignacio Zenteno	Minister of War and Navy; September 18, 1871–September 28, 1871; September 11, 1875–October 11, 1875	Succeeded by José Ramón Lira; Aníbal Pinto
Preceded by Luis Plaza de los Reyes Basso	Deputy for Concepción and Talcahuano; 1873–1876	Succeeded by Carlos Castellón Larenas
Preceded by Belisario Prats	Minister of the Interior; September 18, 1871–September 18, 1876	Succeeded by José Victorino Lastarria
Preceded by Francisco Vargas Fontecilla	Minister of Justice and Public Instruction; 1870–1871	Succeeded by Abdón Cifuentes
