= Emilio Bello Codesido =

Chilean politician (1868–1963)

Emilio Bello
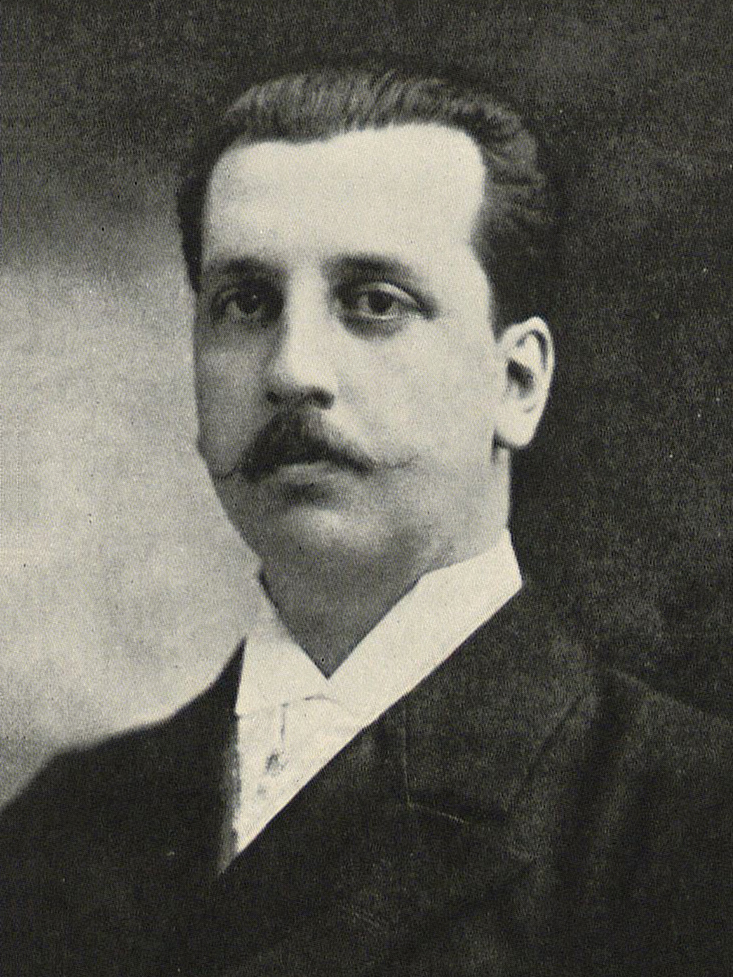
- Bello Codesido in 1920

Minister of National Defense
- In office 17 February 1933 – 11 April 1938
- President: Arturo Alessandri
- Preceded by: Carlos Sáez Morales
- Succeeded by: Francisco Garcés Gana

President of the Government Junta
- In office 27 January 1925 – 12 March 1925
- Preceded by: Pedro Dartnell
- Succeeded by: Arturo Alessandri (as President of the Republic)

Minister of the Interior
- In office 9 September 1924 – 11 September 1924
- President: Arturo Alessandri
- In office 30 October 1904 – 18 March 1905
- President: Germán Riesco
- Preceded by: Rafael Sotomayor Gaete
- Succeeded by: José Rafael Balmaceda

Minister of Foreign Affairs, Worship and Colonization
- In office 2 July 1923 – 11 September 1924
- President: Arturo Alessandri
- Preceded by: Pedro Rivas Vicuña
- Succeeded by: Armando Jaramillo V.
- In office 12 May 1904 – 30 October 1904
- President: Germán Riesco
- Preceded by: Rafael Sotomayor
- Succeeded by: Adolfo Guerrero Vergara
- In office 3 November 1900 – 23 February 1901
- President: Federico Errázuriz Echaurren
- Preceded by: Federico Puga
- Succeeded by: Luis Martiniano Rodríguez

Minister of Justice and Public Instruction
- In office 14 October 1900 – 3 November 1900
- President: Federico Errázuriz Echaurren
- Preceded by: Francisco Herboso
- Succeeded by: Francisco Herboso

Minister of Industry and Public Works
- In office 14 April 1898 – 5 November 1898
- President: Federico Errázuriz Echaurren
- Preceded by: Eduardo Charme
- Succeeded by: Eduardo Charme

Member of the Chamber of Deputies
- In office 1 June 1894 – 15 May 1906
- Constituency: Valparaíso and Casablanca

Personal details
- Born: 31 July 1868 Santiago, Chile
- Died: 3 March 1963 (aged 94) Santiago, Chile
- Resting place: Santiago General Cemetery
- Party: Liberal Democratic Party
- Spouse: Elisa Balmaceda de Toro
- Children: None
- Parent(s): Ricardo Bello Dunn; Matilde Codesido y Oyagüe
- Relatives: Andrés Bello (grandfather); José Manuel Balmaceda (father-in-law)
- Education: University of Chile
- Occupation: Politician; Diplomat
- Profession: Lawyer

Emilio Bello Codesido (31 July 1868 – 3 March 1963) was a Chilean liberal lawyer, diplomat, and politician who briefly exercised executive authority in Chile in 1925. He became president of the Government Junta following the overthrow of Luis Altamirano Talavera, president of the previous governing junta, on 23 January. His brief tenure ended with the return to power of Arturo Alessandri, who came back to Chile after his exile in Italy and France.

In 1937, while serving as Minister of National Defense, Bello was proposed as a presidential candidate by Alessandri, who was then serving his second term as president (1932–1938), ahead of the presidential election scheduled for the following year. However, Gustavo Ross, a liberal politician and Minister of Finance who was in Europe at the time, pre-empted the move, frustrating Alessandri's plans.

Alessandri subsequently expressed his frustration at the prospect of a victory by Popular Front (FP) candidate Pedro Aguirre Cerda. Aguirre Cerda ultimately won the election; Ross later withdrew his allegations of "electoral fraud" on 12 November.

From 1894 to 1906, Bello served four consecutive terms as a member of the Chamber of Deputies of Chile, representing Valparaíso and Casablanca. He subsequently held several ministerial portfolios during the administrations of Federico Errázuriz Echaurren, Germán Riesco, and Arturo Alessandri. Under Alessandri, he briefly served as acting Minister of the Interior and twice held the portfolio of Minister of Foreign Affairs, Worship and Colonization during the period covered in the article. In the diplomatic service, he represented Chile in Bolivia and Mexico.

== Early life ==
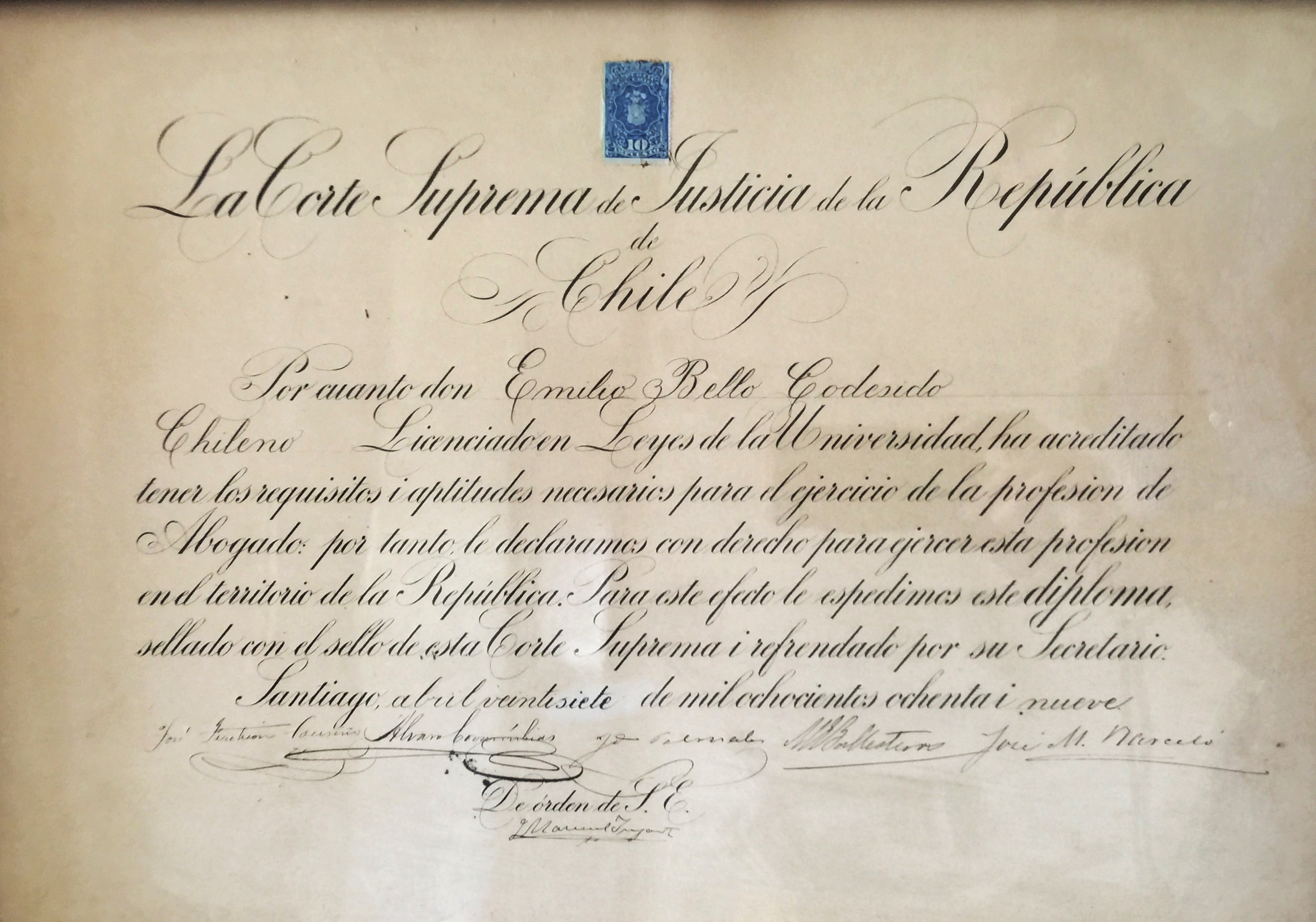
Bello's law degree, dated 27 April 1889.

Bello was born in Santiago, Chile, on 31 July 1868, the son of Andrés Ricardo Bello Dunn and Matilde Codesido y Oyagüe. Through his father, he was a grandson of the Venezuelan philosopher, diplomat, and poet Andrés Bello. He received his primary education at the Colegio Inglés and completed his secondary education at the Instituto Nacional. He subsequently attended the University of Chile, where he qualified as a lawyer on 27 April 1889.

=== Marriage ===
Bello married Elisa Balmaceda de Toro, a daughter of Chilean president José Manuel Balmaceda. The couple had no children. As Balmaceda's son-in-law, Bello encountered political difficulties that resulted in his exile in 1891.

== Political career ==
At the age of sixteen, Bello entered the Ministry of War and Navy, beginning an administrative career as a supernumerary official. He eventually became an undersecretary, but was forced to leave the post in 1891 as a consequence of the Chilean Civil War of 1891. In 1890, he was appointed a member and secretary of the commission charged with preparing a draft Maritime Penal Code, working alongside Luis Claro Solar and Ernesto Hübner.

Following the events of 1891, Bello became involved in organizing the Liberal Democratic Party (PLD), in which he played an active role from 1893. He subsequently served as a director, secretary-general, and president of the party.

Bello was appointed Minister of Industry and Public Works, serving from 14 April to 5 November 1898, and later Minister of Justice and Public Instruction, from 14 October to 3 November 1900. He then served as Minister of Foreign Affairs, Worship and Colonization from 3 November 1900 to 23 February 1901. All three appointments took place during the administration of President Federico Errázuriz Echaurren. He returned to the Foreign Affairs portfolio under President Germán Riesco, serving from 12 May to 30 October 1904. On the latter date, he was appointed Minister of the Interior, a position he held until 18 March 1905.

Nineteen years later, during the administration of Arturo Alessandri, Bello was again appointed Minister of Foreign Affairs, Worship and Colonization, serving from 24 July 1923 until 11 September 1924. During this period, he concurrently served as acting Minister of the Interior from 9 to 11 September 1924. On 5 September 1924, he again assumed responsibility for the Ministry of Foreign Affairs, Worship and Colonization, leaving the ministry on 11 September of that year.

Following the January Revolution, Carlos Ibáñez del Campo transferred supreme executive authority to Bello at La Moneda Palace on the morning of 27 January 1925. Bello then presided over the Government Junta, which also included Pedro Dartnell and Carlos Ward. He assumed the presidency of the junta on 27 January and subsequently transferred power back to the exiled Alessandri on 20 March 1925.

Arturo Alessandri appointed Bello Minister of National Defense on 17 February 1933. He remained in the portfolio until 11 April 1938, during the latter years of Alessandri's second administration.

=== Parliamentary career ===
In 1894, Bello was elected to the Chamber of Deputies of Chile for Valparaíso and Casablanca for the 1894–1897 legislative term. During this period, he served on the Permanent Commission on War and Navy.

He was re-elected for Valparaíso and Casablanca for the 1897–1900 term. During this legislature, he served on the Permanent Commission on Education and Welfare and as a substitute member of the Permanent Commission on Constitution, Legislation and Justice. He was also a member of the Conservative Commission during the 1899–1900 parliamentary recess.

Bello was again elected for Valparaíso and Casablanca for the 1900–1903 term. He served on the Permanent Commission on Foreign Relations. After accepting a diplomatic assignment, he was replaced in the Chamber by Enrique Vicuña Subercaseaux, who took his seat as deputy for Valparaíso on 22 April 1901.

In the 1903 parliamentary elections, Bello was re-elected once again for Valparaíso and Casablanca for the 1903–1906 term. He served as President of the Chamber of Deputies from 2 September 1903 to 3 June 1904. He also served as a member, and subsequently as chairman, of the Permanent Commission on Foreign Relations.

== Diplomatic career ==
Bello served as Chilean minister plenipotentiary to Mexico and the Central American republics from 4 March 1901 to 15 December 1902. He represented Chile as a delegate to the Second Pan-American Conference in Mexico (1901–1902), the Fourth Pan-American Conference in Buenos Aires (1910), and the Fifth Pan-American Conference in Santiago (1923). He was also a Chilean delegate to the League of Nations between 1925 and 1926, during which he served in vice-presidential capacities. In 1919, during the presidency of Juan Luis Sanfuentes, he served as Chile's minister plenipotentiary to Bolivia.

In November 1927, Bello made another journey to Europe, this time accompanied by his wife.

=== Other activities ===
Bello also wrote articles on contemporary affairs and contributed to newspapers and magazines. In addition, he authored several works dealing with international law, international politics, and related subjects. He was a corresponding member of the Royal Academy of Moral and Political Sciences in Madrid.

During the administrations of presidents Pedro Montt and Ramón Barros Luco, Bello served as a member of the Chilean Council of State from 1909 to 1912. In 1919, he was also president of the Local Government Council and of Valparaíso's Second Municipalities Commission.

In 1923, Bello served as president of the Compañía Minera María Francisca de Huanuni. He was also a member of the Club de la Unión and other organizations. He died in his native Santiago on 3 March 1963, aged 94.

== Honours ==
- Grand Cross of the Order of Isabella the Catholic (Spain), 17 September 1925.

== Sources ==
- Araneda Bravo, Fidel (1979). Arturo Alessandri Palma (in Spanish). Editorial Nascimento.
