= Government Junta of Chile (1925) =

Short-lived Chilean government

Government Junta of Chile (January 27, 1925 - March 20, 1925), also known as the January Junta, was the political structure established to restore power to President Arturo Alessandri, after he had been deposed in 1924. On January 23, 1925, a military movement of young officers, wrestled power from the previous September Junta. Then they organized a new Junta and recalled president Alessandri back to his post. The Junta lasted until Alessandri's resumption of power.

== Creation ==
After the September Junta had been a few months in power, the "military committee", led by Colonel Marmaduque Grove and Lieutenant Colonel Carlos Ibáñez del Campo, started to suspect that a Conservative restoration was under way. The fears seemed confirmed when Ladislao Errázuriz Lazcano, head of the conservative party, suddenly presented his candidacy to the upcoming presidential elections. So, on January 23, 1925 they launched the Chilean coup of 1925: army troops surrounded the La Moneda Palace and arrested General Luis Altamirano and the rest of the Junta members.

The power was then handed to a Provisory Junta made of General Pedro Dartnell and General Juan Emilio Ortiz; they in turn gave way to the January Junta on January 27.

== Members ==
Position	Name
President	Emilio Bello Codecido
Member	Division General Pedro Dartnell Encina
Member	Vice Admiral Carlos Artemio Ward Rodríguez

== History ==
As soon as the Junta took power, they recalled President Arturo Alessandri back to Chile, from his exile in Italy. In the meantime, they acted as caretakers and introduced no reforms to the government. Congress had been closed by the previous September Junta, so they didn't have to deal with any legislative matters either. President Alessandri returned and resumed power on March 20, 1925, putting an end to the Junta.

== See also ==
- History of Chile
- List of Government Juntas of Chile
- List of Heads of State
