= 1925 Chilean coup d'état =

Aspect of Chilean history

Date	January 23, 1925
Location	La Moneda Palace, Santiago, Chile
Result	September Junta overthrown; January Junta established

The Chilean coup d'état of 1925 took place on January 23, 1925, when the Chilean military overthrew the September Junta. Led by Colonel Marmaduque Grove, the troops arrested the Junta's President, General Luis Altamirano, and then handed the power to General Pedro Dartnell as interim President. The organizers of the coup hoped to recall former president Arturo Alessandri Palma, who had been forced into exile after the September Junta's coming to power. However, General Dartnell ultimately refused to rule alone and formed the January Junta a few days later, handing power to Emilio Bello Codesido. Alessandri only returned from exile on March 20, 1925, putting an end to the junta.

== Situation before the coup ==
After the initially progressive September Junta had been a few months in power, the "military committee", led by Colonel Marmaduque Grove and Lieutenant Colonel Carlos Ibáñez del Campo, started to suspect that a Conservative restoration was under way. The fears seemed confirmed when Ladislao Errázuriz, head of the Unión Nacional conservative alliance suddenly presented his candidacy to the upcoming presidential elections. At that point, the September Junta lost the confidence of those that had elevated them to power, chiefly among them the Military Union. Young military officers began to plot with the supporters of Arturo Alessandri Palma's return, in particular the Comité Obrero Nacional (National Workers' Committee).

== Military coup d'état ==
On January 23, 1925, at about 5 PM, army troops surrounded the La Moneda Palace. The troops were composed of the "Pudeto" and "Cazadores" Army Regiments and a squadron of Carabineros, all under the command of Colonel Marmaduque Grove. Once the area was secured, the troops entered the Palace, and arrested the President, General Luis Altamirano, and the rest of the September Junta members. Neither the Palace guard nor the government officials presented any resistance, so there were no casualties.

Following this new coup d'état, the power was handed to General Pedro Pablo Dartnell, who refused to rule alone and in turn gave way to the January Junta a few days later. The new junta declared that the leaders of the previous junta had "perverted" the intent of the September 11 Manifesto, qualifying them as "traitors" and stating that "oligarchs [were] not the owners of Chile." One of the first act of the new junta was to arrest Errázuriz, while the popular classes supported the new junta at the condition of Alessandri's return to power. They requested the creation of a Constituent Assembly, while the trade unions threatened to initiate a general strike. Finally, the Federación Obrera de Chile (FOCH, Labour Federation of Chile) gave their support to the "young officials" who had made promises of implementing social measures.

== Sources ==
- Intervenciones militares y poder factico en la politica chilena (de 1830 al 2000), Luis Vitale, 2000 (p. 36) (in Spanish)

== See also ==
- History of Chile
- Arturo Alessandri - deposed by 1924 coup
- September Junta
- January Junta
- Marmaduque Grove
- Carlos Ibáñez del Campo
- List of Chilean coups d'état
