= Urrejola =

Urrejola is a surname. Notable people with the surname include:

- Antonia Urrejola (born 1968), Chilean lawyer
- Fernanda Urrejola (born 1981), Chilean actress
- José Francisco Urrejola (1881–2004), Chilean politician
