= Juan Pablo Bennett =

Chilean military officer and politician

Division General Juan Pablo Bennett
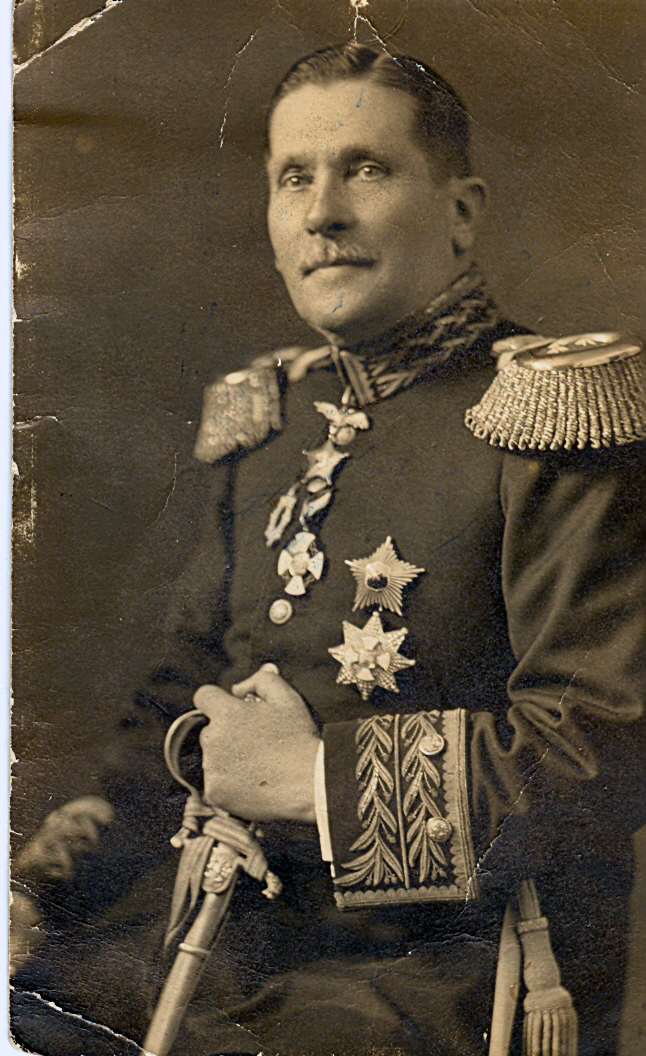

Member of the Government Junta
- In office 11 September 1924 – 23 January 1925
- Preceded by: Position established
- Succeeded by: Position abolished

Minister of War and Navy
- In office 1924–1924
- President: Arturo Alessandri
- Preceded by: Gaspar Mora
- Succeeded by: Luis Gómez Carreño

Personal details
- Born: 25 January 1871 La Serena, Chile
- Died: 12 August 1951 (aged 80) Santiago, Chile
- Spouse: Carlota Agacio
- Children: 5

Juan Pablo Bennett Argandoña (25 January 1871 – 12 August 1951) was a Chilean military officer who served as Minister of War and Navy and as a member of the Government Junta of Chile, which ruled the country from 1924 to 1925.

== Personal life ==
Bennett was born in La Serena, the son of Charles (Carlos) Bennett Stacey and Buenaventura Argandoña Barraza.

In 1903, he married Carlota Agacio Batres, with whom he had five children: Antonio, María Luisa, Juan, Carlota and Jenny.

== Military and public career ==
Bennett pursued a career in the Chilean Army. In 1909, he was posted to the Chilean embassy in Berlin as military attaché. In 1924, President Arturo Alessandri appointed him Minister of War and Navy.

On 11 September 1924, Bennett joined General Luis Altamirano and Vice Admiral Francisco Nef in establishing a military junta following the political crisis that led to the departure of President Arturo Alessandri. Bennett served as a member of the Government Junta, with Altamirano as its president.

The junta remained in power until 23 January 1925, when it was overthrown in another military coup.

Bennett retired from active military service on 6 February 1925 and subsequently withdrew from public life. He died in Santiago on 12 August 1951, aged 80.
