= Abdón Cifuentes =

Chilean politician (1835–1928)

Abdón Cifuentes Espinoza
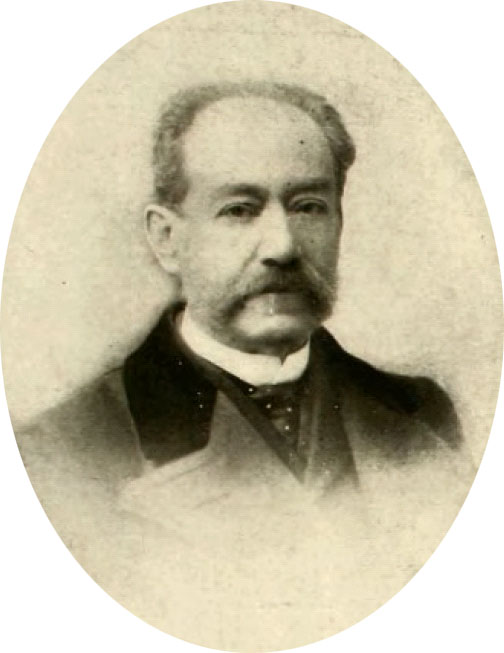
- Born: 16 May 1835; San Felipe, Chile
- Died: 14 April 1928 (aged 92); Santiago, Chile
- Occupations: Politician, lawyer, teacher, writer, newspaper founder

Abdón Cifuentes Espinoza, GCSG (16 May 1835 – 14 April 1928) was a Chilean politician, lawyer, teacher, and writer. He one of Chile's most significant Catholic politicians of the conservative party in the nineteenth century. He was the first political leader in the nation who supported granting the women's right to vote in a speech on August 16, 1865.

== Biography ==
Cifuentes was born in San Felipe, Chile, the son of José Maria Cifuentes Olivares and Paula Espinoza Pinto. He married Luz Gómez, with whom he fathered 13 children. Cifuentes attended the Instituto Nacional (National Institute, now Instituto Nacional General José Miguel Carrera); and then studied law at the Universidad de Chile (University of Chile), receiving his law degree in 1861.

Cifuentes became a professor at the Colegio San Luis and then the Instituto Nacional. In 1882, he was named a member of the Faculty of Philosophy & Humanities of the Universidad de Chile, and in 1889 he became a professor of constitutional rights at the Pontifical Catholic University of Chile.

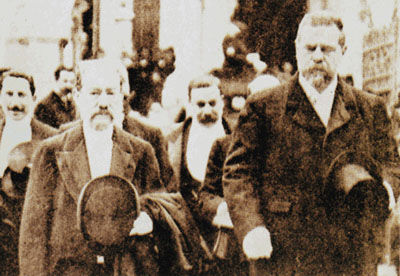
President German Riesco, accompanied by Abdon Cifuentes, leaves congress (1906)

Cifuentes was elected to Parliament as a representative of Rancagua in 1867 and was reelected five times. In 1892, he was elected Senator of Llanquihue in 1892, Aconcagua in 1894, and then Santiago in 1904. In 1871, Abdón Cifuentes was appointed Minister of Public Instruction by President Federico Errázuriz Zañartu, in which role Cifuentes proposed that state schools refrain from holding exams from private schools (mostly Catholic) and that such tests be carried out in the colleges themselves. It was signed into law January 15, 1872, and caused a strong reaction from lay professors.

On January 30, 1872, he signed another law that granted the right to students to study separate branches of law. This attitude greatly troubled the director of the Instituto Nacional, Diego Barros Arana, whom Cifuentes wanted to remove from power, though he was only able to sack part of Barros' faculty. After the students of the Instituto Nacional became disorderly, Barros resigned. The faculty was shaken, and Cifuentes closed the school momentarily to try to reestablish order. His actions in this ordeal were questioned in the congress by Guillermo Antonio Matta, who proposed in 1873 that Cifuentes resign from his post.

Cifuentes also participated in the composition of the act of deposition of President José Manuel Balmaceda in 1891, although he was not able to swear the oath as he was not in Congress at that time, and so Cifuentes administered the oath to the signatories. In 1919, Cifuentes was awarded the Order of St. Gregory the Great by the Vatican, the highest honor that a layman can attain.

He died at age 92 on April 14, 1928, in Santiago.

Political offices
Preceded by Eulogio Altamirano	Minister of Justice, Culture and Public Instruction; 1871-1873	Succeeded by José María Barceló
