= Francisco Nef =

Chilean politician and admiral

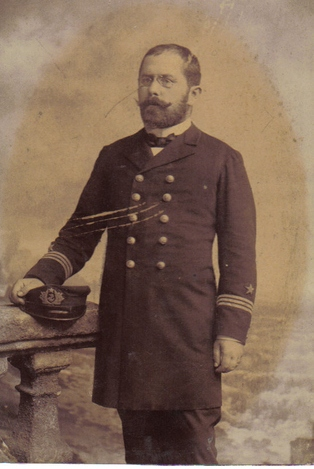
Francisco Nef

Vice Admiral Francisco Nef Jara (August 3, 1863 – June 9, 1931) was a Chilean naval officer and member of the Government Junta that ruled Chile between 1924 and 1925.

Nef was born in Valparaíso. At the age of 16, on March 1, 1879, he joined the Military Academy, where he remained until 1881, when he transferred to the Naval Academy to finish his studies. By 1883, he already was a second-class ensign and joined the crew of the ironclad Blanco, under the command of future president Jorge Montt. During the remainder of the War of the Pacific, he served in the O'Higgins, Chacabuco (blockading Pacocha, in northern Peru), Abtao (patrolling the extreme south of Chile), Cochrane and Pilcomayo.

In November 1884 he was part of the crew of the Blanco that took that ship back to England for a complete rehaul. In 1885 he was sent to France to join the crew of the Colbert, to study French naval tactics. With that ship he visited most of the European and African ports of the time. By 1887, he was a second lieutenant, and participated in the hydrographic reconnaissance of the north of Chile, specially the areas of Esmeralda, Carrizal Bajo, and Arica.

During his career, he served in almost all the ships of the Chilean Fleet. During the 1891 Chilean Civil War, he fought for the congressional side against President José Manuel Balmaceda. After the war, he rose thought the ranks very quickly. By 1896 he already was Commander and in charge of the hydrographic charting of the extreme south of Chile. In 1901 he was named second commander of the Naval Academy. By 1910 he was made a Rear-Admiral and in 1919 a Vice-Admiral. On March 24, 1922, was named Director General of the Navy.

During the conservative military coup of September 11, 1924 that ousted president Arturo Alessandri, he was first named minister of Finance, and then a member of the Government Junta, together with General Luis Altamirano and General Juan Pablo Bennett. He was forced to retire from active duty on October 9, 1924, and died in Valparaíso in 1931.

Political offices
Preceded by Enrique Zañartu Prieto	Minister of Finance; 1924	Succeeded by Fidel Muñoz
Military offices
Preceded by Joaquín Muñoz	Navy General Director; 1922–1924	Succeeded by Salustio Valdés
