= Pedro Dartnell =

Chilean politician and general (1873–1944)

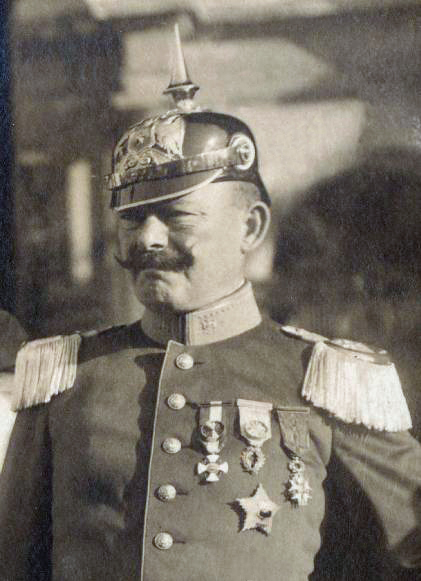

Provisional President of Chile
- In office January 23, 1925 – January 27, 1925
- Preceded by: Luis Altamirano Talavera
- Succeeded by: Emilio Bello Codesido

Personal details
- Born: December 24, 1873 Linares, Chile
- Died: September 26, 1944 (aged 70) Santiago, Chile
- Spouse: María Josefina Matte

Division General Pedro Pablo Dartnell Encina (December 24, 1873 – September 26, 1944) was a Chilean military officer and member of the Government Junta of Chile in 1925.

== Early life ==
Dartnell was born in the city of Linares in 1873, the son of Robert Loder Dartnell and of Carmen Encina Ibáñez. He studied engineering at the Universidad de Chile, specializing in military engineering. In 1885 he was accepted as an Officer Cadet to the Military Academy, where he studied until 1891. He was promoted to sub-lieutenant on January 15, 1891. During the 1891 Chilean Civil War, Dartnell served with the corps of military engineers, and joined the ranks of the Congressional Army. He participated in the battles of Concón and Placilla. That same year he was promoted to Lieutenant and then Captain. After the end of the war, he studied civil engineering at the University of Chile. With the great reform of the Chilean Army, he was sent to specialize in Europe. He travelled to Belgium, Germany and Spain between 1897 and 1899.

In January 1900, he was promoted to Major, and commander of military engineers. Three years later he was a commander already. In 1905 he was destined to the navy to help design the military fortifications of the port of Talcahuano. In 1910 he was sent again to Europe, this time as a student to the Ècole de Guerre, in Paris, where he studied until 1912. During his stay in France, he took an active interest in the French Air Service, and prepared a report which was the basis for the creation of the Chilean Military Air Force in 1913.

As a Colonel, in 1914, he was commander of telecommunications and Aeronautical Inspector. In 1919 he became General Director of the Chilean Air Force. That same year he was promoted to Brigade General. As such he was General Commander of the II, III and IV Divisions, between 1920 and 1924. On November 28, 1924 was promoted to Army Inspector General.

== Political career ==
On January 23, 1925, he was handed the executive power by a group of young officers that deposed the September Junta, but he declined to hold on to the power alone, and chose to become instead just one of the members of the January Junta that took over the government on January 27. This junta ruled until March 20, when President Arturo Alessandri Palma reassumed his functions.

He retired from the army on June 15, 1926. On January 24, 1926, he married María Josefina Rosa Matte Amunátegui, with whom he had four children. In 1930 he was elected Senator for the "Talca, Linares and Maule" district, but only remained in Congress until its dissolution by the Socialist Republic of Chile on June 4, 1932. During his life he was decorated with the following orders: Comendador de Isabel La Católica y Gran Cruz al Mérito Militar, by Spain; Grand Officer of the Italian Crown; Officer of the Légion d'honneur and Grand Officer of the Order of Michael by France; Officer of the Belgium Crown. Dartnell died in Santiago in 1944 at the age of 70.

Political offices
| Preceded by Luis Altamirano | Provisional President; 1925 | Succeeded by Emilio Bello |
| Preceded by None | Member of Government Junta; 1925 | Succeeded by None |
Military offices
| Preceded by Luis Altamirano | Army Inspector General; 1924-1925 | Succeeded by Mariano Navarrete |
