= Ruido de sables =

1924 political event in Chile

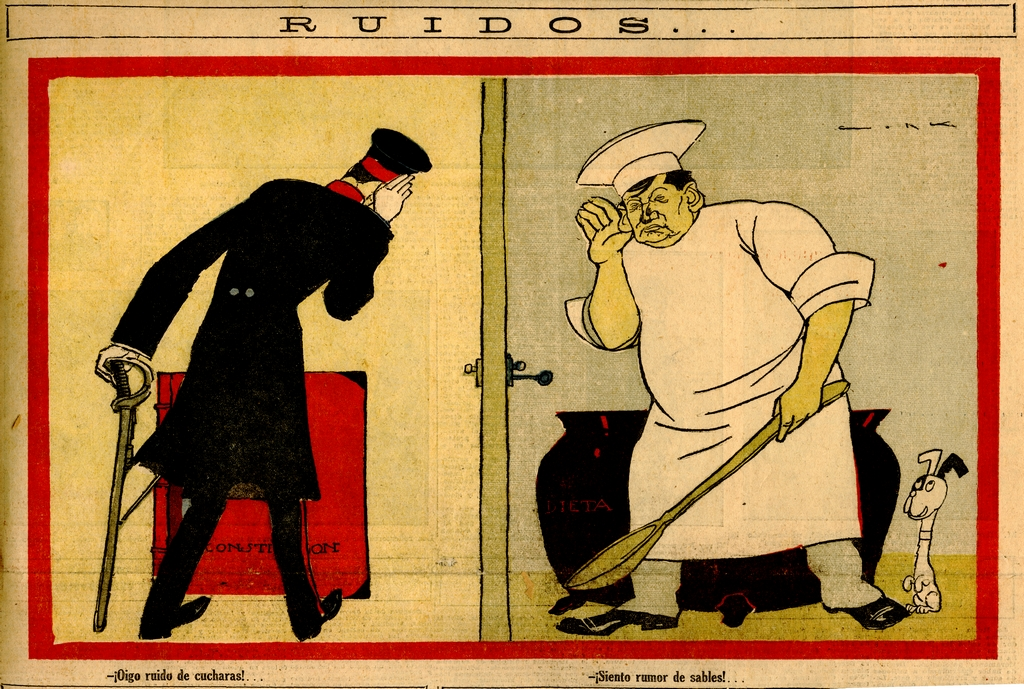
1924 caricature of Arturo Alessandri (right) hearing the noise of sabers

In Chilean political history, the ruido de sables (lit. 'noise of sabers') was an event on 3 September 1924, when a group of young military officers protested against the political class and the postponement of social measures by rattling the scabbards (chapes) of their sabers against the floor.

The term has since become a metaphor in Spanish-speaking countries, referring to a military conspiracy.

== Background ==
In 1924, Chile was in the throes of an economic and political crisis. The economy, heavily dependent on the export of nitrates, was suffering the effects of the discovery of artificial nitrates during World War I. At the same time, Chile was politically paralyzed by a conflict between President Arturo Alessandri and the conservatively controlled congress, who refused to discuss any of the drafts that he sent them.

On February 1, 1924, the political parties signed an agreement to change the parliamentary procedures in order to limit the censure votes (a procedure used to force cabinet ministers to resign), to allow the closure of debates by simple majority and in general to eliminate all dilatory tactics, especially those dealing with the national budget. As an additional measure, they agreed to create a parliamentary stipend (30.000 pesos for the senators, 15.000 pesos for the deputies). This program was received with public outcry, mainly because it was the only law that had been produced by the governing coalition while the social measures prepared by President Alessandri had been postponed time and again. In the Army, the news was especially bitter since they had been waiting for a salary increase for a long time.

== Event ==
On September 3, 1924, a group of 56 young military officers (mostly lieutenants and sub-lieutenants coming from middle classes or working classes), led by Colonel Marmaduke Grove and Major Carlos Ibáñez del Campo, attended the session where the congressional salary discussion was to take place. They quietly sat in the public tribunes, and waited for the topic to be broached. At that point the president of the chamber, feeling intimidated, demanded that the public be cleared, as the discussion was to be secret. As the officers silently started to leave, they began to rattle the scabbards (chapes) of the sabers they wore as part of their dress uniform against the floor, as a way to indicate their discontent with the political class in general, and in a sign of support for Alessandri's social agenda.

This event was the culmination of a process that marked the increasing desire by the military corps of a more active participation in Chilean politics. Since the 1891 Chilean Civil War, the military had been excluded although they were very dependent from all political groups for their advancement. It is also one of the events that mark the end of the so-called "Parliamentary Republic" (1891-1925), also known as the "pseudo-parliamentary" period.

The very next day the same group of young military officers involved led by Colonel Marmaduke Grove and Major Carlos Ibáñez del Campo, created a "military committee" to defend themselves from possible punishments by the government. On September 5, the "military committee" demanded that President Arturo Alessandri dismiss three of his ministers, including the minister of War and Navy Gaspar Mora; the enactment of a labor code, the passage of an income tax law, and the increase in military salaries.

== Outcome ==
Faced with almost open military insurrection, Alessandri had no option but to appoint General Luis Altamirano, the Army Inspector General (Chief of the Army), as head of a new cabinet. On September 8, General Altamirano appeared in front of Congress to demand the passage of eight laws, including Alessandri's labor code. Congress dared not to protest, and the laws, which had been languishing for years, were passed in a matter of hours. These included the Eight-hour day, suppression of child labour, legislation governing collective bargaining as well as labour 'reconciliation' courts and labour arbitrage, legislation on occupational safety, the legalization of trade unions, and a law on cooperatives .

At that point Alessandri felt that he had become a pawn of the military, and, on September 9, he resigned and requested asylum at the United States Embassy. The Chilean Congress refused to accept his resignation, and instead granted him a constitutional six month leave of absence, upon which he immediately left the country for Italy. General Altamirano assumed power as vice president, and on the 11th, a military Junta was established to rule the country on the absence of the formal president, Alessandri.

== See also ==
- History of Chile
- September Junta
- List of Chilean coups d'état
