= José Francisco Urrejola =

Chilean politician

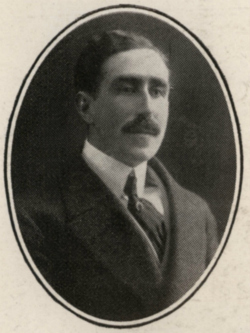

President of the Senate of Chile
- In office 31 May 1944 – 15 May 1945
- Preceded by: Pedro Opaso
- Succeeded by: Arturo Alessandri Palma

Member of the Senate of Chile
- In office 15 May 1937 – 15 May 1945
- Preceded by: Luis Álamos Barros
- Succeeded by: Salvador Ocampo
- Constituency: 2nd Provincial Agrupation (Atacama and Coquimbo)
- In office 15 May 1926 – 1 March 1930
- Preceded by: Julio Velasco González
- Succeeded by: Santiago Silva Álvarez
- Constituency: 23rd Departamental Agrupation (Osorno and Río Negro)
- In office 15 May 1918 – 15 May 1924
- Preceded by: Enrique Zañartu Prieto
- Succeeded by: Francisco Jorquera Fuhrmann
- Constituency: 23rd Departamental Agrupation (Osorno and Río Negro)
- In office 15 May 1915 – 15 May 1918
- Preceded by: Francisco Concha Cienfuegos
- Succeeded by: Julio Silva Rivas
- Constituency: 23rd Departamental Agrupation (Osorno and Río Negro)

Personal details
- Born: 11 November 1881 Concepción, Chile
- Died: 19 November 1946 (aged 69) Santiago, Chile
- Party: Conservative Party
- Education: University of Chile (BA)
- Occupation: Politician
- Profession: Lawyer

José Francisco Urrejola Menchaca (born 11 November 1881 – 19 November 1946) was a Chilean politician and lawyer who served as President of the Senate of Chile.
