= Government Junta of Chile (1924) =

Short-lived Chilean government

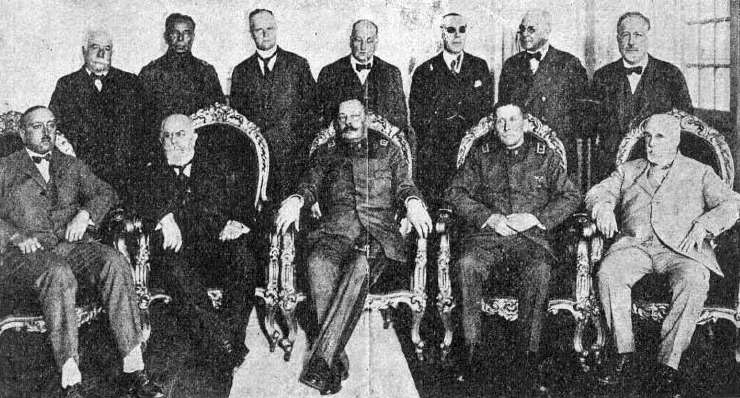
Members of the 1924 Government Junta of Chile.

Government Junta of Chile (September 11, 1924 - January 23, 1925), also known as the September Junta, was the political structure established to rule Chile following the anti-conservative military coup that assumed power after first interfering in progressive President Arturo Alessandri's deadlocked government. It ruled the country until it was ousted by yet another military coup, and gave way to the January Junta.

== Creation ==
During most of 1924, Chile had been politically paralyzed by a conflict between the President and the conservatively controlled congress, who refused to discuss the laws that he sent them. On September 3, 1924 a group of 56 military officers protested for their low salaries, in the incident known as the rattling of the sabres. The next day the same group of young military officers, led by Colonel Marmaduke Grove and Major Carlos Ibáñez, created a "military committee" to defend themselves from threatened sanctions by the government in response to their actions. On September 5, the "military committee" demanded of President Arturo Alessandri the dismissal of three of his ministers, including the minister of War; the enactment of a labor code; the passage of an income tax law; and the improvement of the military budget and salaries. Alessandri had no option but to appoint General Luis Altamirano, the Army Inspector General (Chief of the Army), as head of a new cabinet.

On September 8, General Altamirano appeared in front of Congress to demand the passage of eight laws, including Alessandri's labor code. Congress dared not to protest, and the laws that had been languishing for years were passed in a matter of hours. These included the 8 hour day, suppression of child labour, regulation of collective bargaining, legislation on occupational safety, legalization of trade unions, a law on cooperatives and the creation of courts of conciliation and labour arbitrage.

At that point, Alessandri felt that he had become just a pawn of the military, and, on September 9, he resigned and requested asylum at the US Embassy. Congress refused to accept his resignation, and instead granted him a six-months constitutional leave of absence. He left the country immediately for Italy. General Altamirano assumed power as Vice President and on September 11 a military Junta was established to rule the country in the absence of the titular president, Alessandri.

The military movement was not homogeneous, and included an anti-oligarchist wing headed by Marmaduque Grove and Carlos Ibáñez. They expressed their positions in the September 11 manifesto, which theorized a kind of "Manifest Destiny" of the Armed Forces to support the country's development. The manifesto stigmatized the "corruption of the political life," justifying the coup by an alleged institutional crisis. It also alleged imminent "civil unrest" (contienda civil) from which the country had to be protected.

== History ==
The Junta was composed of General Luis Altamirano, chief of the Army and constitutional Vice President; Admiral Francisco Nef, chief of the Navy; and General Juan Pablo Bennett, who became the representative of the "military committee". General Altamirano proceeded to close Congress and, declaring the state of siege, assumed dictatorial powers. During his conservative rule, he tried several measures to control the economic crisis and to reform the local bureaucracy. Nonetheless, from the very beginning the Junta proved ineffective in implementing any real changes to the political status quo.

The "military committee" started to suspect that a Conservative restoration was under way. The fears seemed confirmed when Ladislao Errázuriz, head of the Conservative Party and of the Unión Nacional alliance, suddenly presented his candidacy to the upcoming presidential elections. At that point, the Junta lost the confidence of those who had elevated them to power, chiefly among them the military committee. Young military officers began to contact sectors working in favour of Arturo Alessandri's return, in particular the Comité Obrero Nacional (National Workers' Committee).

On January 23, 1925, army troops surrounded the La Moneda Palace and arrested General Altamirano. Following this new coup d'état, the power was handed to General Pedro Pablo Dartnell, who in turn gave way to the January Junta a few days later. The new junta declared that the leaders of the previous junta had "perverted" the intent of the September 11 Manifesto, qualifying them as "traitors" and stating that "oligarchs [were] not the owners of Chile." One of the first act of the new junta was to arrest Errázuriz, while the popular classes supported the new junta at the condition of Alessandri's return to power.

== Members ==
Position	Name
Division General	Luis Altamirano
Vice Admiral	Francisco Nef
Division General	Juan Pablo Bennett

== See also ==
- History of Chile
- List of Government Juntas of Chile
- List of Heads of State
- 1925 Chilean coup d'état

== Sources ==
- Intervenciones militares y poder factico en la politica chilena (de 1830 al 2000), Luis Vitale, 2000
