= Luis Altamirano =

Chilean military officer

Division General Luis Altamirano
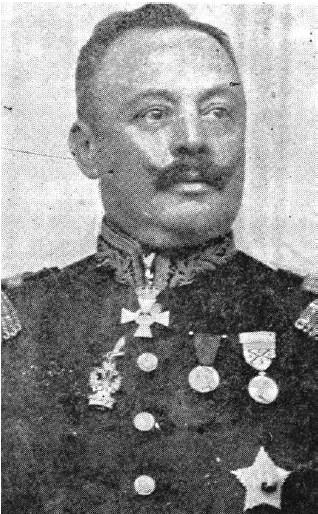

President of the Government Junta
- In office 11 September 1924 – 23 January 1925
- Preceded by: Arturo Alessandri (as President of Chile)
- Succeeded by: Pedro Dartnell

Minister of the Interior
- In office 1924–1924
- President: Arturo Alessandri
- Preceded by: Pedro Aguirre Cerda
- Succeeded by: Alcibíades Roldán

Minister of War and Navy
- In office 1923–1924
- President: Arturo Alessandri
- Preceded by: Jorge Guerra
- Succeeded by: Alfredo Ewing

Inspector General of the Army
- In office 1922–1924
- President: Arturo Alessandri
- Preceded by: Arístides Pinto
- Succeeded by: Pedro Dartnell

Personal details
- Born: 5 July 1867 Concepción, Chile
- Died: 25 July 1938 (aged 71) Santiago, Chile
- Education: Libertador Bernardo O'Higgins Military School

Luis Altamirano Talavera (5 July 1867 – 25 July 1938) was a Chilean military officer and politician who served as a government minister and vice president of Chile before becoming president of the Government Junta of Chile, which ruled the country from 1924 to 1925.

During his tenure, the junta introduced a number of labor measures. A decree issued on 4 October 1924 restricted night work in bakeries, pastry shops and confectionery establishments.

== Biography ==
Altamirano was born in Concepción, the son of Eulogio Altamirano and Antonia Talavera Appleby. He studied law and began his career at the Ministry of Justice before entering military service.

During the 1891 Chilean Civil War, Altamirano joined the Congressional Army as an artillery captain. He rose to the rank of lieutenant colonel by the end of the conflict and subsequently left the Army, returning to active service in 1897.

== Military career ==
In 1898, Altamirano was appointed commander of the 3rd Artillery Regiment. He was promoted to colonel in 1908 and became deputy chief of the General Staff. In 1911, he was posted to the Chilean embassy in Berlin as military attaché. The following year, he was promoted to brigadier general and appointed inspector general of artillery and chief of the Army General Staff.

Altamirano was promoted to division general in 1919 and placed in command of the II Division. In 1922, he became inspector general of the Army, then the highest-ranking position in the Chilean Army. In that capacity, he headed the Chilean delegation sent to attend the inauguration of a new president of Argentina. He subsequently entered the cabinet of President Arturo Alessandri as Minister of War and Navy.

== Political career ==
The political crisis that brought Altamirano to power began with the Ruido de sables of September 1924.

On 5 September, a group of young military officers led by Colonel Marmaduke Grove and Major Carlos Ibáñez del Campo pressed President Arturo Alessandri for changes to his cabinet and the enactment of a series of measures that included labor legislation, an income tax and increased military salaries.

Alessandri responded by appointing Altamirano, then inspector general of the Army, as Minister of the Interior and placing him at the head of a new cabinet. On 8 September, Altamirano appeared before Congress to press for the passage of eight pending measures, including Alessandri's proposed labor legislation and income tax. Congress approved the legislation within hours.

As military involvement in the government increased, Alessandri tendered his resignation on 9 September and sought asylum at the United States embassy. Because Altamirano was serving as Minister of the Interior, he assumed executive authority as vice president in the president's absence. Congress declined to accept Alessandri's resignation, instead granting him a six-month leave of absence, after which he left Chile for Italy.

On 11 September, Altamirano established a military junta with Vice Admiral Francisco Nef and General Juan Pablo Bennett, serving as its president. The Government Junta dissolved Congress and assumed control of the national government.

The junta sought to address the country's economic difficulties and reorganize the public administration, but Altamirano gradually lost the support of the military officers whose intervention had precipitated the September crisis. On 23 January 1925, he was overthrown and arrested in another military coup, bringing his government to an end.

=== Retirement ===
Altamirano retired from active military service on 6 February 1925 and withdrew from public life. He died in Santiago in 1938.
