= Arturo Alessandri =

17th and 21st President of Chile (1920–24, 1925, 1932–38)

Arturo Alessandri OMCh
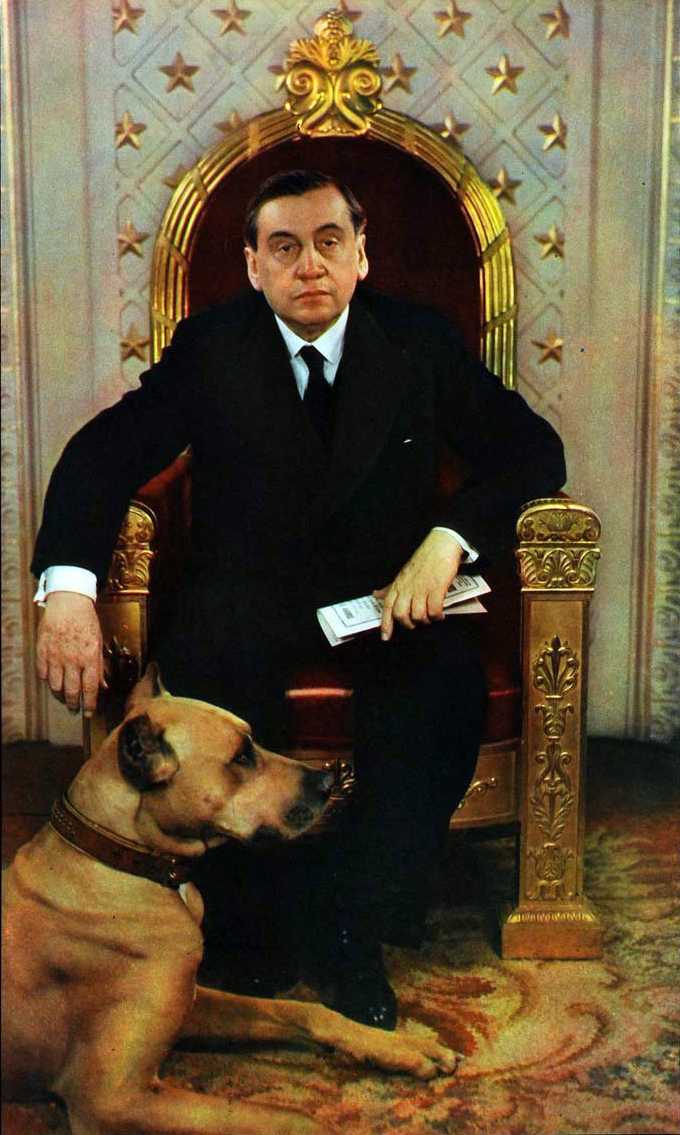

18th and 22nd President of Chile
- In office 24 December 1932 – 24 December 1938
- Preceded by: Abraham Oyanedel (acting)
- Succeeded by: Pedro Aguirre Cerda
- In office 12 March 1925 – 1 October 1925
- Preceded by: Emilio Bello Codesido
- Succeeded by: Luis Barros Borgoño (acting)
- In office 23 December 1920 – 9 September 1924
- Preceded by: Juan Luis Sanfuentes
- Succeeded by: Luis Altamirano

Member of the Senate
- In office 1949 – 24 August 1950
- Succeeded by: Arturo Matte Larraín
- Constituency: 4th Provincial Grouping, Santiago

President of the Senate of Chile
- In office 22 June 1949 – 24 August 1950
- Succeeded by: Fernando Alessandri
- In office 22 May 1945 – 31 May 1949
- Preceded by: José Francisco Urrejola
- Succeeded by: Humberto Álvarez Suárez

Senator of the Republic of Chile
- In office 1944 – 15 May 1949
- Preceded by: Amador Pairoa
- Constituency: 6th Provincial Grouping; Curicó, Talca, Maule and Linares

Minister of the Interior
- In office 22 April 1918 – 6 September 1918
- President: Juan Luis Sanfuentes
- Succeeded by: Pedro García de la Huerta Izquierdo

Minister of Finance
- In office 16 June 1913 – 17 November 1913
- President: Ramón Barros Luco
- Preceded by: Manuel Rivas Vicuña
- Succeeded by: Ricardo Salas Edwards

Personal details
- Born: December 20, 1868 Longaví, Chile
- Died: August 24, 1950 (aged 81) Santiago, Chile
- Party: Liberal
- Spouse: Rosa Ester Rodríguez
- Children: Arturo; Rosa; Ester; Jorge; Fernando; Hernán; Eduardo; Marta; Mario
- Education: University of Chile
- Profession: Lawyer
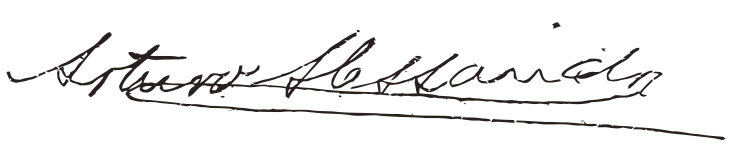
- Signature

Arturo Fortunato Alessandri Palma (Latin American Spanish: [aɾˈtuɾo foɾtu'nato aleˈsandɾi ˈpalma]; December 20, 1868 – August 24, 1950) was a Chilean political figure and reformer who served thrice as president of Chile, first from 1920 to 1924, then from March to October 1925, and finally from 1932 to 1938. He was a member of the Liberal Party.

== Early life ==
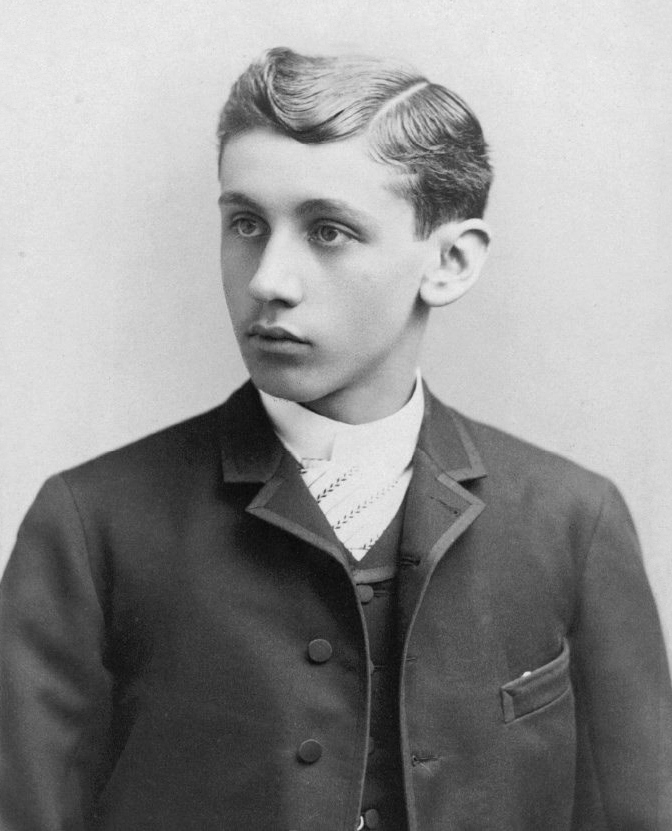
Arturo Alessandri during his youth.

Arturo Alessandri was the son of Pedro Alessandri Vargas and Susana Palma Guzmán. His grandfather, Pietro Allesandri Tarzi, was an Italian immigrant from Tuscany who had arrived in Chile from Argentina in 1821. Alessandri's father, Pedro, became head of the family at the age of 19; at the time of Alessandri's birth, he ran an estate in Longaví. At the age of 12, Alessandri enrolled at the Sacred Hearts High School, where his brothers and father had studied.

At the age of 20, Alessandri began his legal studies at the University of Chile. In 1891, while studying, he participated in the newspaper La Justicia, which was opposed to then President José Manuel Balmaceda. After graduating in 1893, Alessandri married Rosa Ester Rodríguez Velasco, with whom he had 9 children.

== Political career ==
In 1897, Alessandri began his political career, becoming a member of the Liberal Party and representative of Curicó, a seat he would keep for nearly 20 years. In 1915, already aspiring to the presidency, Alessandri challenged the senator of Tarapacá Province, Arturo del Río; he won a hard-fought victory, from where he earned the nickname of "León de Tarapacá" ("Lion of Tarapacá").

In the 1920 Chilean presidential election, Alessandri was the Liberal Alliance candidate for president, narrowly defeating his opponent of the Coalition Party, Luis Barros Borgoño. With speeches favoring the working class, Alessandri alarmed Chilean conservatives, who felt their interests were in jeopardy. Alessandri's campaigning was characterized by "great personal energy and scathing denunciation of the oligarchy", promising sweeping reforms. Since the opposition controlled the National Congress, Alessandri favored strengthening the executive power, which lacked political weight before the Congress (Parliamentary Era).

== First administration ==
Alessandri's first term was characterized by tensions between the executive and the legislature, as Alessandri was unsuccessful in getting legislative approval for the social and political reforms he ran on in the 1920 presidential election.

Alessandri used executive powers to intervene in the 1924 parliamentary elections, resulting in a larger majority for the Liberal Alliance in the Senate and command of the Chamber of Deputies.

During most of 1924, Chile had been politically paralyzed by a conflict between the President and the conservatively controlled Congress, who refused to enact the laws that he submitted. On September 3, 1924, a group of 56 military officers protested for their low salaries, in the incident known as the ruido de sables (or "saber-rattling"). The next day the same group of young military officers led by Colonel Marmaduque Grove and Major Carlos Ibáñez del Campo, created the "military committee" to defend themselves from the government. On September 5, the "military committee" demanded of President Alessandri the dismissal of three of his ministers, including the Minister of War; the enactment of a labor code, the passage of an income tax law, and the improvement of the military salaries. Alessandri had no option but to appoint General Luis Altamirano, the Army Inspector General, as head of a new cabinet. On September 8, General Altamirano appeared in front of Congress to demand the passage of eight laws, including Alessandri's labor code. Congress didn't dare to protest, and the laws were passed in a matter of hours.

Several reforms were introduced in early September that were of direct benefit to labor. An Act of September the 8th 1924 made sickness insurance mandatory for all wage earners with an annual income of under 8,000 pesos. Compensation was introduced for occupational diseases and industrial accidents in accordance (as noted by one study) "with the extended principle of occupational risk." Labor unions were given the right (as one authority has noted) "to receive a share of the profits of the undertaking to be used for mutual benefit purposes, and invests them with legal personality for the purpose of concluding collective contracts of employment and in connection with strikes." legislation was also introduced that same month which organized permanent workers' delegations in various workplaces employing more than 10 people, while also setting up permanent conciliation and arbitration boards for dealing with collective disputes. An eight-hour day for workers in all industries was also provided by law. In addition, Chile became the first Latin American nation (as noted by one authority) "to enact special legislation for determining and defining the new essentials of the contract of employment."

At that point, Alessandri felt that he had become just a pawn of the military and on September 9, he resigned, and requested asylum at the US Embassy. Congress refused to accept his resignation, and instead granted him a six-month constitutional leave of absence. He left the country immediately for Italy. On September 11, a military Junta — the September Junta — was established to rule the country in his absence.

== Second administration ==
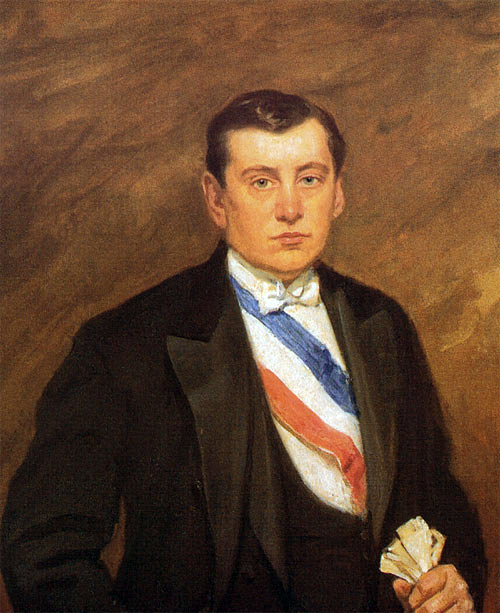
Official portrait of Arturo Alessandri.

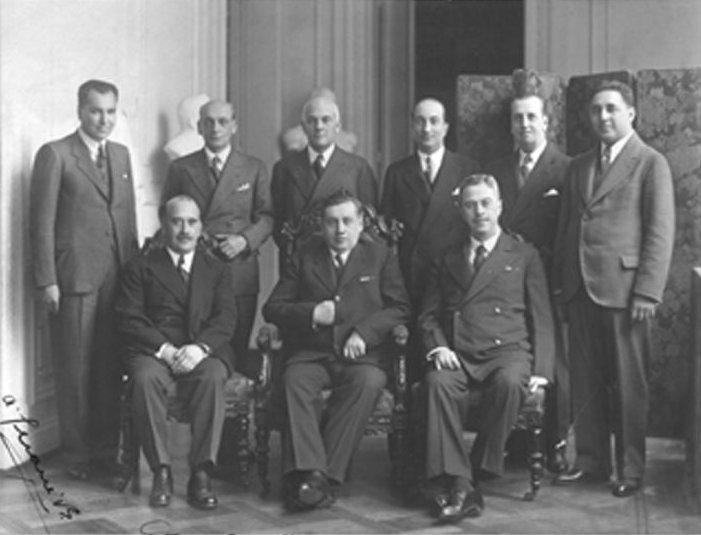
Arturo Alessandri (sitting in center) together with his Ministers of State, in April 1934

The September Junta was not homogeneous, and quickly a progressive wing, headed by Marmaduke Grove and Carlos Ibáñez del Campo, developed contacts with the Comité Obrero Nacional and others labour organizations who advocated for Alessandri's return. This led to a coup in January 1925, directed by Colonel Grove who handed out the power to General Pedro Dartnell as interim president while waiting for Alessandri's return. Dartnell formed the January Junta, before retroceding the power to Alessandri on March 20, 1925. Alessandri had a new Constitution drafted, and approved by plebiscite by 134,421 voters on August 30. The Constitution, which was promulgated on September 18, 1925, reinforced presidential powers over the legislative. Furthermore, Alessandri created a Central Bank, initiating the first rupture with laissez faire policies. In February 1937, a law was passed that made the payment of a living wage to private employees mandatory. The scope of the country's Compulsory Social Insurance Act was also extended, while insurance for members of the national merchant marine was introduced.

His second government began with the support of left-wing and radical groups. However, this second group began to distance itself from the President. In March 1925, Alessandri's government repressed a demonstration, leading to the Marusia massacre, soon followed by La Coruña massacre. This break with the working classes caused him to try to maintain a right-wing-radical alliance until 1937, when it took a turn towards the left. In order to face the threats of a coup, Alessandri relied on the republican forces, entrusted with repressing any intent to revolt and never to get involved in politics. They were created shortly before Alessandri's return, as a consequence of the civil movement. They functioned in secret and then publicly, marching in a great parade May 7, 1933, in front of the President, who saluted them. They auto-disbanded in 1936, having considered their mission complete. The President asked the Parliament on several opportunities for the state of constitutional exception, resulting in illegal actions, such as the famous burning of the Topaze Magazine issue No. 285, which depicted a caricature of Alessandri he considered offensive.

That time was also marked by the appearance of new violent occurrences, such as the rural rebellion of Ránquil and their bloody repression, and the Nazi-inspired National Socialist Movement of Chile of Jorge González von Marées. In the economic sphere, the recovery of the crisis of 1929 was begun with the work of the Treasury Minister Gustavo Ross, a pragmatic liberal who implemented a "towards in" approach to growth. With respect to nitrates, he dissolved COSACH and created the COVENSA (Corporation of Nitrate and Iodine Sale), a multi-faceted distributor and not a producer. He balanced the fiscal deficit with new taxes and resumed payment of the external debt, with losses for holders of Chilean bonds. When they reached a surplus, they focused on public works. The construction of the National Stadium in Santiago, inaugurated in December 1938, stands out.

The degree of Alessandri's responsibility in the 1938 Seguro Obrero massacre has been a subject of speculation.

== Public life after the presidency ==
His political life did not end with his presidency. Due to the death of the communist Senator of Curico, Talca, Linares and Maule, Amador Pairoa, he participated in a complementary Senatorial election and won, returning to the Senate on November 8. In 1949 he was reelected but this time for Santiago, while also chosen to be President of this body.

He was of vital importance in the presidential elections of 1942 and 1946, in the first by causing a division of votes of the liberals, supporting Juan Antonio Ríos, and in the second by presenting himself as a preliminary candidate of the liberals. He later yielded his candidacy to his son Fernando, resulting in the division of the presidential candidates of the right and conservative support for Dr. Eduardo Cruz-Coke, in turn favoring the victory of Gabriel González Videla.

While President of the Senate of Chile, Alessandri died at the age of 82, on August 24, 1950, and was replaced by his son Fernando Alessandri. One of his other sons, Jorge Alessandri, was president of Chile from 1958 to 1964.

== Honours and awards ==
Arms of Arturo Alessandri as knight of the Order of the Dannebrog

=== Foreign Honours ===
Denmark:

- Grand Cross with Diamonds of the Order of the Dannebrog (4 October 1937)

Portugal:

- Grand Cross of the Order of the Tower and Sword (6 July 1925)

Spain:

- Grand Cross of the Order of Naval Merit (1912)

== See also ==
- Alessandri family
- San Gregorio massacre
- Marusia massacre
- La Coruña massacre
- Seguro Obrero massacre

Political offices
Preceded by Emilio Bello Codesido	Minister of Industry and Public Works; 1898-1899	Succeeded by Daniel Rioseco
Preceded by Pedro García de la Huerta Izquierdo	Minister of Finance; 1913	Succeeded by Ricardo Salas Edwards
Preceded by Domingo Amunátegui	Minister of the Interior; 1918	Succeeded by Pedro García de la Huerta
Preceded by Juan Luis Sanfuentes	President of Chile; 1920-1924	Succeeded by Luis Altamirano Talavera
Preceded by Emilio Bello Codesido	President of Chile; 1925	Succeeded by Luis Barros Borgoño
Preceded by Abraham Oyanedel	President of Chile; 1932-1938	Succeeded by Pedro Aguirre Cerda
Preceded by José Francisco Urrejola	President of the Senate of Chile; 1945-1949	Succeeded by Humberto Alvarez
Preceded by Humberto Alvarez	President of the Senate of Chile; 1949-1950	Succeeded by Fernando Alessandri
